= Independence Party (United States) =

Defunct political party in the United States

- Chairman: William Randolph Hearst
- Founded: 1906
- Dissolved: 1914
- Preceded by: Municipal Ownership League
- Headquarters: New York City, NY
- Newspaper: Hearst Newspapers
- Ideology: Reformism; Merit system Progressivism
- Colors: Bronze (party's medal color)

Millionaire publisher William Randolph Hearst was the financial angel of the Independence Party, an organization represented in this contemporary cartoon as his fawning puppet.

The Independence Party, established as the Independence League, was a short-lived minor American political party sponsored by newspaper publisher and politician William Randolph Hearst in 1906. The organization was the successor to the Municipal Ownership League under whose colors Hearst had run for Mayor of New York in 1905.

After its second-place finish in a race for Governor of Massachusetts in 1907, the party set its sights on the Presidency, and held a national convention to nominate a ticket in 1908. The party garnered only 83,000 votes nationally in the 1908 election and immediately dissolved as a national force.

The Independence League of New York continued to nominate candidates for office in New York state until the state election of 1914.

== Establishment ==
In 1905, millionaire newspaper publisher William Randolph Hearst made a high-profile run for Mayor of New York City under the banner of the Municipal Ownership League. Hearst ran on a reform ticket in opposition to incumbent Tammany Hall Democrat George B. McClellan, Jr. and Republican William Mills Ivins, Sr. Hearst narrowly missed election, losing to the Democrat by fewer than 3,500 votes out of nearly 600,000 cast between the three candidates, with the New York Supreme Court ultimately deciding the matter in favor of Tammany Hall on June 30 amidst charges of electoral fraud.

In the wake of its defeat, the Municipal Ownership League was replaced by a new political organization with a less socialistically oriented name: the Independence League of New York.

In 1906, Hearst again ran for political office, this time being defeated in the race for Governor of New York on a Democratic–Independence League fusion ticket. Despite his own loss, other members of the fusion slate were elected, including Lewis S. Chanler as lieutenant governor, John S. Whalen as Secretary of State, Martin H. Glynn as comptroller, Julius Hauser as treasurer, William S. Jackson as Attorney General, and Frederick Skene as state engineer.

Parallel Independence Leagues were active at the same time in several other states, including California and Massachusetts. In the latter, state party nominee Thomas L. Hisgen garnered a substantial number of votes in the 1907 election for governor, topping the candidate of the Democratic Party for second place. Prospects seemed bright for a new national political organization to replace the Democrats as the chief opposition party in the United States.

=== 1908 Presidential convention ===
Buoyed by the promising results for Thomas Hisgen in Massachusetts, the Independence League moved to establish a national presence as the Independence Party ahead of the election of 1908 at a convention held in Chicago. The gathering was convened on July 27, 1908, at Orchestra Hall, which was bedecked with patriotic red-white-and-blue bunting and streamers.

Although Hisgen was regarded as a favorite to win nomination prior to convocation, the nominating convention's decision was not unanimous nor the nomination process without acrimony, requiring three ballots of the assembled delegates to reach an ultimate decision. The first person nominated was former Congressman Milford W. Howard of Fort Payne, Alabama, placed into consideration by a long-winded speech which drew catcalls. The Howard nomination was followed by a speech by Rev. Roland D. Sawyer of Massachusetts, who formally placed Hisgen's name into the pool of candidates. This was followed by the nomination of Georgian John Temple Graves, the editor of a Hearst newspaper.

An attempt by a Kansas delegate to put the name of Democratic Party standard bearer William Jennings Bryan into nomination was met with raucous jeering which briefly prevented the speaker from continuing. With order restored, the speaker continued in his effort to formally nominate Bryan, causing an even more fierce explosion of rage and protest, as a report in The New York Times indicates:

"A scene of riot immediately followed, several delegates attempting to reach the rostrum for the purpose of offering physical violence to the speaker. 'I intend, if I am allowed to finish, to nominate Mr. William J. Bryan,' said Mr. [J.I.] Sheppard.

"The hall broke into a wild uproar, a dozen delegates vainly struggling in the main aisle in an attempt to reach Mr. Sheppard. Canes and fists were shaken at him furiously, while howls of execration went up from all sides of the hall."

Only after an extended period of tumult was order restored and Sheppard ruled out of order on the grounds of having nominated an individual who was not a member of the Independence Party. Sheppard walked from the rostrum under protection of the convention's two sergeants of arms, but was still swung at with a cane by a New York delegate as he passed down the aisle, with the New Yorker forcibly restrained. An announcement shortly followed that Sheppard had been removed as a member of the National Committee of the Independence Party.

With the nominations finally complete, convention voting ensued. The first ballot saw a tally of 396 votes for Hisgen, 213 for Graves, 200 for Howard, 71 for Reuben R. Lyon, and 49 for William Randolph Hearst. A second ballot brought Hisgen to the doorstep of nomination, gathering 590 votes, compared to 189 for Graves and 109 for Howard. Only in the early morning hours of Wednesday, July 29 did Hisgen go over the top, winning the nomination. Graves was chosen as Hisgen's Vice-Presidential running mate by the gathering.

=== Party platform ===
The party platform adopted by the Chicago convention declared that corporate corruption, waste in government spending, the exploitative pricing of monopolies, a costly tariff, and rule by political machines had exacted a costly economic toll on both investors and working people alike. Both the Republican and Democratic parties, were to blame, the Independence Party declared, and it cast itself as the banner-bearer in the effort "to wrest the conduct of public affairs from the hands of selfish interests, political tricksters, and corrupt bosses" and to make government "an agency for the common good."

The party platform argued against corrupt machine politics, for the eight-hour work day, against the use of judicial injunctions to settle labor disputes, for the creation of a Department of Labor, for improved workplace safety, and for the establishment of a central bank. The organization expressed its disapproval of maintenance of blacklists against striking workers and against the use of prison labor for the production of goods for the marketplace. The organization also favored broad implementation of the initiative and referendum system and in favor of the power of recall of elected officials.

Although mildly social democratic in content, the platform of the Independence Party took pains to cast the organization as "a conservative force in American politics, devoted to the preservation of American liberty and independence."

=== Final efforts ===
The national party collapsed after the 1908 election, in which Hisgen and Graves won less than one percent of the popular vote.

Hearst ran again for Mayor of New York in 1909, and for lieutenant governor in 1910, but was defeated both times. The New York Independence League continued to nominate candidates for Governor and Lieutenant Governor of New York until the state election of 1914.

== Presidential tickets ==
Year	Presidential nominee	Home state	Previous positions	Vice presidential nominee	Home state	Previous positions	Votes
1908	Thomas L. Hisgen	Massachusetts	American petroleum producer	John T. Graves	Georgia (U.S. state)	Newspaper editor	82,574 (0.55%); 0 EV
