= New York City mayoral elections =

The mayor of New York City is elected in early November every four years, in the year immediately following a United States presidential election year, and takes office at the beginning of the following year. New York City, which elects the mayor as its chief executive, consists of the five boroughs (Manhattan, The Bronx, Brooklyn, Queens and Staten Island), which consolidated to form "Greater" New York on January 1, 1898.

The consolidated city's first mayor, Robert A. Van Wyck, was elected with other municipal officers in November 1897. Mayoral elections previously had been held since 1834 by the City of Brooklyn and the smaller, unconsolidated City of New York (Manhattan, later expanded into the Bronx).

The current mayor is Zohran Mamdani, who was sworn in on January 1, 2026, after winning the 2025 mayoral election.

== Overview ==
=== Terms and term limits (since 1834) ===
Direct elections to the mayoralty of the unconsolidated City of New York began in 1834 for a term of one year, extended to two years after 1849. The 1897 Charter of the consolidated City stipulated that the mayor was to be elected for a single four-year term. In 1901, the term halved to two years, with no restrictions on reelection. In 1905, the term was extended to four years once again. (Mayors Fiorello La Guardia, Robert F. Wagner Jr. and Ed Koch were later able to serve for twelve years each.) In 1993, the voters approved a two-term (eight-year) limit, and reconfirmed this limit when the issue was submitted to referendum in 1996. In 2008, the New York City Council voted to change the two-term limit to three terms (without submitting the issue to the voters). Legal challenges to the council's action were rejected by Federal courts in January and April, 2009. However, in 2010, yet another referendum, reverting the limit to two terms, passed overwhelmingly.

Year	Term	Term limit	Years	Mayor(s) affected
Unconsolidated City
1834	1 year	(no limit)	(unlimited)	all from Cornelius Van Wyck Lawrence to Caleb S. Woodhull
1849	2 years	(no limit)	(unlimited)	all from Ambrose Kingsland to William L. Strong^{1}
Greater New York (The Five Boroughs)
1897	4 years	1 term	4 years	Robert A. Van Wyck
1901	2 years	(no limit)	(unlimited)	Seth Low and George B. McClellan Jr.^{2}
1905	4 years	(no limit)	(unlimited)	all from George B. McClellan Jr.^{2} to David Dinkins^{3}
1993	4 years	2 terms	8 years	Rudy Giuliani^{4}
2008	4 years	3 terms	12 years	Michael Bloomberg^{5} only^{6}
2010	4 years	2 terms	8 years	Bill de Blasio and his successors^{6}

Principal source: The Encyclopedia of New York City (see Sources below), entries for "charter" and "mayoralty".

1. Mayor Strong, elected in 1894, served an extra year because no municipal election was held in 1896, in anticipation of the consolidated City's switch to odd-year elections.
2. George B. McClellan Jr. was elected to one two-year term (1904–1905) and one four-year term (1906–1909)
3. David Dinkins was not affected by the term limit enacted in 1993 because he had served only one term by 1993 and failed to win re-election.
4. The September 11 attacks on the World Trade Center in Manhattan coincided with the primary elections for a successor to Mayor Giuliani, who was completing his second and final term of office. Many were so impressed by both the urgency of the situation and Giuliani's response that they wanted to keep him in office beyond December 31, 2001, either by removing the term limit or by extending his service for a few months. However, neither happened, the primary elections (with the same candidates) were re-run on September 25, the general election was held as scheduled on November 6, and Michael Bloomberg took office on the regularly appointed date of January 1, 2002.
5. On October 2, 2008, Michael Bloomberg announced that he would ask the city council to extend the limit for mayor, council and other officers from two terms to three, and that, should such an extended limit prevail, he himself would seek re-election as mayor. On October 23, the New York City Council voted 29–22 to extend the two-term limit to three terms. (A proposed amendment to submit the vote to a public referendum had failed earlier the same day by a vote of 22–28 with one abstention.)
6. In November 2010, yet another popular referendum, limiting mayoral terms to two, passed overwhelmingly.

==== Interrupted terms of New York City's elected mayors since 1834 ====
Mayors John T. Hoffman (1866–68, elected Governor 1868), William Havemeyer (1845–46, 1848–49, and 1873–74), William Jay Gaynor (1910–13), Jimmy Walker (1926–32), and William O'Dwyer (1946–50) failed to complete the final terms to which they were elected. The uncompleted mayoral terms of Hoffman, Walker, and O'Dwyer were added to the other offices elected in (respectively) 1868, 1932, and 1950 [those three elections are listed as "special" in the table below because they occurred before the next regularly scheduled mayoral election; the "regular" mayoral elections of 1874 and 1913, on the other hand, were held on the same day that they would have happened had the mayoralty not become vacant.]

Elected mayor	Last elected	End of service	Interim successor†^{2, 3}	Election	Elected successor^{4}
John T. Hoffman (D)	Dec. 1867	resigned 30 Nov. 1868	Thomas Coman (D)	Dec. 1868 (special)	A. Oakey Hall (D)
William Havemeyer (R)^{1}	Nov. 1872	died 30 Nov. 1874	Samuel B. H. Vance (R)	Nov. 1874 (regular)	William H. Wickham (D)
William Gaynor (D)	Nov. 1909	died 10 Sept. 1913	Ardolph L. Kline (R)	Nov. 1913 (regular)	John P. Mitchel (Fusion)
Jimmy Walker (D)	Nov. 1929	resigned 1 Sept. 1932	Joseph V. McKee (D)	Nov. 1932 (special)	John P. O'Brien (D)
William O'Dwyer (D)	Nov. 1949	resigned 31 Aug. 1950	Vincent Impellitteri (D)	Nov. 1950 (special)	Vincent Impellitteri (Experience)

† Became acting mayor as the president of the board of aldermen or (in 1950) city council.

(D) = (Democratic)

(R) = (Republican)

1. Havemeyer was a Democrat who ran as a Republican against the Democratic Tweed Ring in 1872.
2. Coman, Vance and Kline did not seek election as mayor.
3. McKee and Impellitteri were Democrats who lost the Democratic primary to succeed themselves, but still ran in the general election as independents.
4. Hall won re-election, while Wickham did not seek it. Mitchel and O'Brien lost attempts at re-election, while Impellitteri did not run for a full term in the 1953 regular general election after losing the Democratic primary.

=== Summary tables ===
==== Principal candidates' city-wide vote since 1897 ====
The below table is a snapshot of the mayoral election results for major candidates, with each election year linking to more detailed sections on this page. The candidates have the ballot line they ran on in that election campaign, which may not always reflect their formal party affiliation during that time. The winning candidate is emphasized in bold face shaded in the color of their main ballot line. Candidates who were serving as the incumbent mayor at the time of the election (elected or acting) are in italics and an additional "(inc.)" notation.

A general summary of the table's abbreviated parties is: D = Democratic Party, R = Republican Party, Lib = Liberal Party, Cons = Conservative Party, Ind = Independent, Soc = Socialist Party of America, ALP = American Labor Party, WFP = Working Families Party, Independence = Independence Party, Jeff = Jeffersonian (George's 1897 campaign), Exp = Experience Party (Impellitteri's 1950 campaign), Jobs & Edu = Independent Jobs and Education Party (Bloomberg's 2009 campaign)

Year	Total	Democratic	D Total (%)	Major third party	Third party total (%)	Republican	R total (%)	Other major candidates	Other total (%)
1897	523,560	**Robert A. Van Wyck**	**233,997 (44.7%)**	Seth Low, Citizens Union	151,540 (28.9%)	Benjamin F. Tracy	101,863 (19.5%)	Henry George, Jeff	21,693 (4.1%)
1901	579,301	Edward M. Shepard	265,177 (45.8%)	**Seth Low, R-Citizens Union (Fusion)**	**296,813 (51.2%)**			Ben Hanford, Social Democrat	9,834 (1.7%)
1903	589,898	**George B. McClellan Jr.**	**314,782 (53.4%)**	Seth Low, R-Citizens Union (Fusion)	252,086 (42.7%)			Charles Forman, Social Democrat	16,956 (2.9%)
1905	604,673	**George B. McClellan Jr.**	**228,407 (37.8%)**	William R. Hearst, Municipal Ownership League	224,989 (37.2%)	William M. Ivins	137,184 (22.7%)	Algernon Lee, Socialist	11,817 (2.0)
1909	594,902	**William J. Gaynor**	**250,378 (42.1%)**	William R. Hearst, Civic Alliance	154,187 (25.9%)	Otto Bannard, R-Fusion	177,313 (29.8%)	Joseph Cassidy, Soc.	19,768 (2.0%)
1913	627,017	Edward McCall	233,919 (37.3%)	**John P. Mitchel, Fusion**	**358,181 (57.1%)**			Charles E. Russell, Soc	32,057 (5.1%)
1917	673,300	**John Francis Hylan**	**314,010 (46.6%)**	John P. Mitchel, Fusion (inc.)	155,497 (23.1%)	William M. Bennett	56,438 (8.4%)	Morris Hillquit, Soc	145,332 (21.6%)
The State of New York granted women the right to vote in 1917, doubling the potential total vote.
1921	1,168,767	**John Francis Hylan** (inc.)	**750,247 (64.2%)**			Henry M. Curran, R-Coalition	332,846 (28.5%)	Jacob Panken, Soc	82,607 (7.1%)
1925	1,137,966	**Jimmy Walker**	**748,687 (65.8%)**			Frank Waterman	346,564 (30.5%)	Norman Thomas, Soc	39,574 (3.5%)
1929	1,429,385	**Jimmy Walker** (inc.)	**867,522 (60.7%)**			Fiorello La Guardia	367,675 (25.7%)	Norman Thomas, Soc	175,697 (12.3%)
1932	1,990,899	**John P. O'Brien**	**1,054,324 (53.0%)**	Joseph McKee, Ind write-in (inc.)	241,899 (12.2%)	Lewis H. Pounds	443,020 (22.3%)	Morris Hillquit, Soc	251,656 (12.6%)
1933	2,152,505	John P. O'Brien (inc.)	586,672 (27.3%)	Joseph McKee, Recovery	609,053 (28.3%)	**Fiorello La Guardia, R-Fusion**	**868,522 (40.4%)**	Chas Solomon, Soc	59,846 (3.0%)
1937	2,235,386	Jeremiah T. Mahoney, D-Trades Union-Anticommunist	890,756 (39.8%)			**Fiorello La Guardia, R-ALP-Fusion-Progressive** (inc.)	**1,344,630 (60.2%)**		
1941	2,263,369	William O'Dwyer	1,054,235 (46.6%)			**Fiorello La Guardia, R-ALP-Fusion-United City** (inc.)	**1,186,518 (52.4%)**	George W. Hartmann, Soc.	24,145 (1.1%)
1945	1,982,361	**William O'Dwyer, D-ALP**	**1,125,357 (55.3%)**	Newbold Morris, No Deal	408,348 (20.6%)	Jonah J. Goldstein, R-Lib-Fusion	431,601 (21.2%)	Joseph G. Glass, Soc.	9,304 (0.5%)
1949	2,591,684	**William O'Dwyer** (inc.)	**1,266,512 (48.9%)**			Newbold Morris, R-Lib-Fusion	956,069 (36.9%)	Vito Marcantonio, ALP	356,626 (13.8%)
1950	2,626,476	Ferdinand Pecora, D-Lib	935,351 (35.6%)	**Vincent Impellitteri, Exp** (inc.)	**1,161,175 (44.2%)**	Edward Corsi	382,372 (14.6%)	Paul Ross, ALP	147,578 (5.6%)
1953	2,204,368	**Robert Wagner**	**1,022,626 (46.3%)**	Rudolph Halley, Lib-Ind	467,106 (21.1%)	Harold Riegelman	661,591 (30.0%)	Clifford MCAvoy, ALP	53,048 (2.4%)
1957	2,179,878	**Robert Wagner, D-Lib-Fusion** (inc.)	**1,509,775 (69.2%)**			Robert K. Christenberry	585,768 (26.9%)	Vito Battista, United Taxpayers Party	67,266 (3.1%)
1961	2,424,985	**Robert Wagner, D-Lib-Brotherhood** (inc.)	**1,237,421 (51.0%)**	Lawrence E. Gerosa, Ind-Citizens Party	321,604 (13.3%)	Louis Lefkowitz, R-Ind-Civic Action	835,691 (34.5%)	Vito Battista, United Taxpayers Party	19,960 (0.8%)
1965	2,554,199	Abraham Beame, D-Civil Service Fusion	1,046,699 (41.0%)	William F. Buckley, Cons	341,226 (13.4%)	**John Lindsay, R-Lib-Independent Citizens**	**1,149,106 (45.0%)**	Vito Battista, United Taxpayers Party	11,104 (0.4%)
1969	2,390,834	Mario Procaccino, D-Ind-Civil Service Ind	831,772 (34.8%)	**John Lindsay, Lib-Ind** (inc.)	**1,012,633 (42.4%)**	John Marchi, R-Cons	542,411 (22.7%)	Rasheed Storey, Communist	4,018 (0.2%)
1973	1,705,634	**Abraham Beame**, D-Civil Service & Fusion	**963,542 (56.5%)**	Albert H. Blumenthal, Lib-Good Gov't	262,600 (15.4%)	John Marchi, R-Integrity	274,052 (16.1%)	Mario Biaggi, Cons-Safe City	186,977 (11.0%)
1977	1,435,113	**Ed Koch**	**717,376 (50.0%)**	Mario Cuomo, Lib-Neighb. Gvt.	587,913 (41.0%)	Roy M. Goodman	58,606 (4.1%)	Barry Farber, Cons	57,437 (4.0%)
1981	1,222,644	**Ed Koch, D-R** (inc.)	**912,622 (74.6%)**	Frank J. Barbaro, Unity	162,719 (13.3%)			John Eposito, Cons.	60,100 (4.9%)
1985	1,112,796	**Ed Koch, D-Ind** (inc.)	**868,260 (78.0%)**	Carol Bellamy, Lib	113,471 (10.2%)	Diane McGrath, R-Cons	101,668 (9.1%)	Yehudi Levin, Right to Life	14,517 (1.3%)
1989	1,819,695	**David Dinkins**	**917,544 (50.4%)**	Ronald S. Lauder Cons.	9,271 (0.5%)	Rudy Giuliani, R-Lib-Ind Fusion	870,464 (47.8%)	Henry F. Hewes, Right To Life	17,460 (1.0%)
1993	1,783,937	David Dinkins (inc.)	858,868 (48.1%)			**Rudy Giuliani, R-Lib**	**903,114 (50.6%)**	George Marlin, Cons.-Right To Life	15,926 (0.9%)
1997	1,367448	Ruth Messinger	549,335 (40.5%)			**Rudy Giuliani, R-Lib** (inc.)	**783,815 (57.7%)**	Sal Albanese, Independence	14,316 (1.1%)
2001	1,480,914	Mark Green, D-WFP	709,268 (47.9%)			**Michael Bloomberg, R-Independence**	**744,757 (50.3%)**	Alan Hevesi, Liberal- Better Schools	10,331 (0.7%)
2005	1,289,935	Fernando Ferrer	503,219 (39.0%)			**Michael Bloomberg, R-Lib-Independence** (inc.)	**753,089 (58.4%)**	Thomas Ognibene, Cons.	14,630 (1.1%)
2009	1,154,802	Bill Thompson, D-WFP	534,869 (46.3%)			**Michael Bloomberg, R-Independence-Jobs & Edu** (inc.)	**585,466 (50.7%)**	Stephen Christopher, Cons.	18,013 (1.6%)
2013	1,087,710	**Bill de Blasio, D-WFP**	**795,679 (73.2%)**			Joe Lhota, R-Cons-Taxes 2 High-Students First	264,420 (24.3%)	Adolfo Carrion, Independence	8,675 (0.8%)
2017	1,166,314	**Bill de Blasio, D-WFP** (inc.)	**760,112 (66.2%)**	Akeem Browder, Green	16,536 (1.4%)	Nicole Malliotakis, R, Cons, Stop de Blasio	316,947 (27.6%)	Sal Albanese, Reform	24,484 (2.1%)
2021	1,125,258	**Eric Adams**	**753,801 (67.0%)**			Curtis Sliwa, R-Ind	312,385 (27.8%)	Cathy Rojas, Socialism & Liberation	27,982 (2.5%)
2025	2,194,204	**Zohran Mamdani, D-WFP**	**1,114,184** **(50.8%)**	Andrew Cuomo, Fight and Deliver	906,614 (41.3%)	Curtis Sliwa, R-Protect Animals	153,749 (7.0%)	Eric Adams, Safe and Affordable/End Anti-Semitism	6,897 (0.3%)

=== By borough ===
See the table above for more information about the candidates and parties involved. Blue indicates a candidate endorsed by the Democratic Party; pink one endorsed by the Republicans; and buff (or beige) one endorsed by neither party. (Darker shades indicate that a borough voted for a candidate who lost the citywide vote.) In 1981, Ed Koch ran on the tickets of both the Democrats and the Republicans.

Click a year to see the table or tables for that particular election (# indicates a link devoted to one specific election rather than to a set of two to six.)

Although separate boroughs since 1898, the Bronx and Manhattan shared New York County and reported elections together until the separate Bronx County was formed in April 1912 and started her separate existence on January 1, 1914. The borough of Richmond changed its name to Staten Island in 1975, although the co-extensive Richmond County still retains that name.

Borough	Manhattan and the Bronx		Brooklyn	Queens	Richmond [S.I.]	City of New York
County	[ New York ]		[ Kings ]	[ Queens ]	[ Richmond ]	
1897	Van Wyck 48%		Van Wyck 40%	Van Wyck 41%	Van Wyck 44%	Van Wyck 45%
1901	Low 49%		Low 55%	Shepard 49%	Low 52%	Low 51%
1903	McClellan 56%		McClellan 49%	McClellan 56%	Low 48%	McClellan 53%
1905	McClellan 42%		Hearst 39%	Hearst 39%	McClellan 44%	McClellan 38%
1909	Gaynor 43%		Gaynor 42%	Gaynor 38%	Gaynor 47%	Gaynor 42%
Borough	Manhattan	The Bronx	Brooklyn	Queens	Richmond [S.I.]	City of New York
County	[ New York ]	[ Bronx ]	[ Kings ]	[ Queens ]	[ Richmond ]	
1913	Mitchel	Mitchel	Mitchel 60%	Mitchel 60%	Mitchel 54%	Mitchel 57%
§ 1917	Hylan 46%	Hylan 43%	Hylan 47%	Hylan 52%	Hylan 58%	Hylan 47%
§ 1921	Hylan 63%	Hylan 68%	Hylan 62%	Hylan 69%	Hylan 71%	Hylan 64%
§ 1925	Walker 70%	Walker 72%	Walker 61%	Walker 63%	Walker 67%	Walker 66%
§ 1929	Walker 64%	Walker 63%	Walker 58%	Walker 62%	Walker 58%	Walker 61%
§ 1932	O'Brien 61%	O'Brien 52%	O'Brien 51%	O'Brien 48%	O'Brien 54%	O'Brien 53%
§ 1933	La Guardia 38%	La Guardia 39%	La Guardia 44%	La Guardia 39%	La Guardia 44%	La Guardia 40%
§ 1937	La Guardia 58%	La Guardia 62%	La Guardia 63%	La Guardia 55%	La Guardia 56%	La Guardia 60%
§ 1941	La Guardia 56%	La Guardia 58%	La Guardia 55%	O'Dwyer 60%	O'Dwyer 60%	La Guardia 52%
§ 1945	O'Dwyer 56%	O'Dwyer 55%	O'Dwyer 57%	O'Dwyer 61%	O'Dwyer 66%	O'Dwyer 55%
§ 1949	O'Dwyer 45%	O'Dwyer 49%	O'Dwyer 49%	O'Dwyer 53%	O'Dwyer 65%	O'Dwyer 48%
§ 1950	Impellitteri 40%	Pecora 42%	Pecora 41%	Impellitteri 55%	Impellitteri 60%	Impellitteri 44%
§ 1953	Wagner 48%	Wagner 46%	Wagner 47%	Wagner 41%	Wagner 52%	Wagner 46%
§ 1957	Wagner 74%	Wagner 77%	Wagner 75%	Wagner 64%	Wagner 65%	Wagner 68%
§ 1961	Wagner 56%	Wagner 56%	Wagner 53%	Wagner 46%	Lefkowitz 42%	Wagner 50.1%
§ 1965	Lindsay 56%	Beame 47%	Beame 47%	Lindsay 47%	Lindsay 46%	Lindsay 43%
§ 1969	Lindsay 67%	Procaccino 41%	Procaccino 42%	Lindsay 36%	Marchi 62%	Lindsay 41%
§ 1973	Beame 49%	Beame 57%	Beame 63%	Beame 57%	Beame 47%	Beame 57%
Borough	Manhattan	The Bronx	Brooklyn	Queens	Staten Island	City of New York
County	[ New York ]	[ Bronx ]	[ Kings ]	[ Queens ]	[ Richmond ]	
§ 1977	Koch	Koch	Koch	Cuomo	Cuomo	Koch 52%
§ 1981	Koch	Koch	Koch	Koch	Koch	Koch 75%
§ 1985	Koch	Koch	Koch	Koch	Koch	Koch 78%
§ 1989	Dinkins	Dinkins	Dinkins	Giuliani	Giuliani	Dinkins 48%
§ 1993	Dinkins	Dinkins	Dinkins	Giuliani	Giuliani	Giuliani 49%
§ 1997	Giuliani 50.9%	Messinger 54.8%	Giuliani 53.3%	Giuliani 64.6%	Giuliani 78.6%	Giuliani 57.7%
§ 2001	Green 52%	Green 54.7%	Green 52.5%	Bloomberg 55.3%	Bloomberg 77.1%	Bloomberg 50.3%
§ 2005	Bloomberg 60.4%	Ferrer 59.8%	Bloomberg 58.2%	Bloomberg 63.5%	Bloomberg 76.7%	Bloomberg 58.4%
§ 2009	Bloomberg 55.8%	Thompson 61.2%	Thompson 51.6%	Bloomberg 54.5%	Bloomberg 66.2%	Bloomberg 50.7%
§ 2013	de Blasio 71.7%	de Blasio 86.1%	de Blasio 77.5%	de Blasio 70.3%	Lhota 52.8%	de Blasio 73.2%
§ 2017	de Blasio 72.0%	de Blasio 79.9%	de Blasio 72.7%	de Blasio 61.0%	Malliotakis 70.6%	de Blasio 66.5%
§ 2021	Adams 80.4%	Adams 76%	Adams 70.8%	Adams 59.8%	Sliwa 66.4%	Adams 67%
§ 2025	Mamdani 52.7%	Mamdani 51.7%	Mamdani 57.1%	Mamdani 47.9%	Cuomo 55.2%	Mamdani 50.8%

Although it was not uncommon for a candidate to carry all five boroughs in the same election, variations in voting patterns are noticeable. Since it started reporting separate returns in 1913, the Bronx has supported a Republican only three times (Fiorello La Guardia in 1933, 1937, and 1941). Manhattan has opposed only two successful candidates (Giuliani in 1993 and Bloomberg in 2001). On the other hand, in the 15 elections since 1961 that were contested between Democratic and Republican candidates (i.e. excluding 1981, when Ed Koch was endorsed by both parties), Staten Island has voted for only two Democratic candidates, Abe Beame in 1973 and Koch in 1985. Prior to this, it had only voted Republican three times (in 1903, 1933, and 1937). Queens has voted for only three Republicans until 1961 (in 1903, 1933, and 1937), but since 1961 it voted for the winner all but twice (in 1977 and 1989). Brooklyn has backed a Republican twice since 1945 (in 1997 and 2005). 1985 was the last election in which any candidate swept all five boroughs.

== Some basic patterns of mayoral elections in New York City ==
=== Democrats, Republicans, and reformers ===
One pattern, stretching back well before consolidation and lasting into the 1960s, is the conflict between, on one side, Tammany Hall, the Democratic political organization largely built on political patronage with a consequent deep skepticism about Civil Service, the merit system of assigning government jobs, and competitive bidding for city contracts, and on the other hand, its various opponents, including Republicans, businessmen opposed to taxation or extorted bribes, middle-class reformers and labor union activists.

Until the election of Fiorello H. La Guardia in 1933, it was almost never possible to unite the disparate anti-Tammany elements in a coalition strong enough to prevail for more than one election. (This was not only for negative reasons: Tammany could listen to and satisfy some of its opponents' needs, and could on occasion run candidates of undoubted quality, such as Abram Hewitt to oppose Henry George's United Labor Party in 1886. ) In the reported words of the Tammany leader George Washington Plunkitt, reformers were only "mornin' glories —- looked lovely in the mornin' and withered up in a short time, while the regular machines went on flourishin' forever, like fine old oaks.".

=== Fusion, second ballot lines, and third parties ===
The local term for uniting several constituencies or movements against Tammany was Fusion, which usually required the Republicans to abstain from competing with a non-Republican reform candidate (as in the elections of Seth Low in 1901 and John P. Mitchel in 1913). Later the unusual ability of New York candidates to combine (fuse) votes from several different parties allowed Republicans and Democrats to run their own reform candidates on third party lines, such as "Fusion", American Labor, Liberal, Conservative and Independence. In fact, no Republican has ever been elected Mayor of consolidated New York without the support of at least one other significant party, from LaGuardia to the ex-Democrat Michael Bloomberg.

Even when a candidate could not gain another party's support, they often found it expedient to create a separate line or party name for independent voters to support him, such as "Recovery" (Joseph V. McKee in 1933), "Anticommunist" (Jeremiah T. Mahoney in 1937), "Experience" (Vincent Impellitteri in 1950) or "Brotherhood" (Robert F. Wagner Jr. in 1961). In 1965, Rep. John Lindsay (R-Liberal) won votes on the "Independent Citizens" line, while his opponent Comptroller Abe Beame (D) won additional votes for "Civil Service Fusion".

Although granting or withholding endorsement was an effective tool for a minor party to influence a candidate's policies and actions, it could sometimes lead to counter-pressure from those who felt that candidates were being swayed too far in the wrong direction. This was one of the main reasons for founding the Conservative Party of New York in 1962 by those upset at the liberalism of Republican Governor Nelson A. Rockefeller and (later) Lindsay, against whose 1965 Mayoral campaign the Conservatives ran William F. Buckley, Jr.

More recently, there has been a trend of reformers working not through third parties (such as the now-dormant Liberals) but through Reform Democratic clubs, leading to lively internal contests such as the 1989 Democratic primary where David Dinkins unseated incumbent Mayor Ed Koch who started his own political career in a Reform Democratic Club. On the other side, however, dissatisfied conservatives have created their own new parties outside the Republican Party, such as the New York State Right to Life Party and the Independence Party of New York.

== Recent elections ==
=== 2025 ===
Democratic state assemblyman Zohran Mamdani won the election, becoming the city's youngest mayor in a century. He was the first mayoral candidate since 1969 to receive more than one million votes, and the race was the first since 1969 to attract more than two million votes in total.

=== 2021 ===
Brooklyn Borough President Eric Adams of the Democratic Party defeated Guardian Angels founder Curtis Sliwa, who ran on the Republican and Independent lines by a margin of 441,416 votes or 66.99% against 27.76%. Notable third-party candidates included teacher Cathy Rojas of the Party for Socialism and Liberation (2.49%/27,982 votes) and retired police officer Bill Pepitone of the Conservative Party (1.12%/12,575 votes) and Stacey Prussman of the Libertarian Party (0.3%/3,189). However, this was ultimately a fairly partisan election by New York City standards with 94% of voters voting on the Democratic and Republican lines. This was likely due to the absence of the Working Families Party from the ballot, who elected not to endorse a candidate, and the standalone candidacy of the Conservative Party, who typically garner votes by endorsing the Republican candidate.

=== 2017 ===
Bill de Blasio, the incumbent mayor, won re-election to a second term, on Democratic and Working Families Party lines, over challengers Nicole Malliotakis on the Republican and Conservative party lines, Sal Albanese on the Reform Party line, Akeem Browder on the Green Party line, independent candidates Mike Tolkin and Bo Dietl, and Libertarian Party candidate Aaron Commey.

=== 2013 ===
The principal candidates were Joe Lhota on the Republican and Conservative lines, Bill de Blasio on the Democratic and Working Families lines, and some independents. Bill de Blasio won the election in a landslide

==== 2013 results by borough ====
General election
		Manhattan	The Bronx	Brooklyn	Queens	Staten Island	Total
Democratic-Working Families	Bill de Blasio	195,317 (71.69%)	121,511 (86.08%)	263,823 (77.52%)	181,921 (70.28%)	33,107 (44.20%)	795,679 (73.15%)
Republican-Conservative	Joe Lhota	69,434 (25.48%)	15,559 (11.02%)	68,543 (20.14%)	71,306 (27.55%)	39,538 (52.79%)	264,420 (24.31%)
Independence	Adolfo Carrión Jr.	2,161 (0.79%)	2,595 (1.84%)	1,463 (0.43%)	1,754 (0.68%)	702 (0.94%)	8,675 (0.80%)
Green	Anthony Gronowicz	1,655 (0.61%)	324 (0.23%)	1,507 (0.44%)	1,177 (0.45%)	320 (0.43%)	4,983 (0.46%)
Jobs & Education-Common Sense	Jack Hidary	1,081 (0.40%)	151 (0.11%)	1,630 (0.48%)	541 (0.21%)	237 (0.32%)	3,640 (0.33%)
Rent Is Too Damn High	Jimmy McMillan	579 (0.21%)	154 (0.11%)	608 (0.18%)	480 (0.19%)	169 (0.23%)	1,990 (0.18%)
School Choice	Erick Salgado	267 (0.10%)	342 (0.24%)	932 (0.27%)	324 (0.13%)	81 (0.11%)	1,946 (0.18%)
Libertarian	Michael Sanchez	446 (0.16%)	128 (0.09%)	485 (0.14%)	449 (0.17%)	238 (0.32%)	1,746 (0.16%)
Socialist Workers	Daniel B. Fein	230 (0.08%)	59 (0.04%)	253 (0.07%)	177 (0.07%)	39 (0.05%)	758 (0.07%)
Tax Wall Street	Randy Credico	317 (0.12%)	47 (0.03%)	155 (0.05%)	128 (0.05%)	43 (0.06%)	690 (0.06%)
Freedom Party	Michael K. Greys	161 (0.06%)	65 (0.05%)	241 (0.07%)	89 (0.03%)	19 (0.03%)	575 (0.05%)
Reform Party	Carl E. Person	86 (0.03%)	20 (0.01%)	85 (0.02%)	83 (0.03%)	32 (0.04%)	306 (0.03%)
Affordable Tomorrow	Joseph Melaragno	55 (0.02%)	26 (0.02%)	92 (0.03%)	85 (0.03%)	31 (0.04%)	289 (0.03%)
War Veterans	Sam Sloan	19 (0.01%)	23 (0.02%)	44 (0.01%)	43 (0.02%)	37 (0.05%)	166 (0.02%)
Flourish Every Person	Michael J. Dilger	12 (0.00%)	4 (0.00%)	29 (0.01%)	4 (0.00%)	6 (0.01%)	55 (0.01%)
N/A	Write-ins	639 (0.23%)	149 (0.11%)	440 (0.13%)	304 (0.12%)	300 (0.40%)	1,792 (0.16%)
	Total	272,459 (25.05%)	141,157 (12.98%)	340,330 (31.29%)	258,865 (23.80%)	74,899 (6.89%)	1,087,710 (100.00%)

Democratic primary election, Tuesday, September 10, 2013

Bill de Blasio, the city's elected public advocate, won 40.8% of the total Democratic primary vote and, by exceeding 40.0%, avoided an October 1 primary runoff with Bill Thompson, who won the second-highest number of primary votes, or 26.1%. (In 2009, Thompson had won the Democratic primary, only to lose a close general election to Mayor Michael Bloomberg.) Christine Quinn, the Speaker of the New York City Council, came in third, with 15.7%, while none of the other candidates, including City Comptroller John Liu and former Congressman Anthony Weiner, won as much as 10%. De Blasio carried all five boroughs, and Thompson came in second in every borough except Manhattan, where he finished third behind Quinn.

From the Board of Elections in the City of New York, September 27, 2013

2013 Democratic primary	Manhattan	The Bronx	Brooklyn	Queens	Staten Island	Total	%
Bill de Blasio	81,197	36,896	104,703	52,190	7,358	282,344	
Bill de Blasio	40.9%	38.1%	46.4%	35.0%	34.3%		40.8%
Bill Thompson	42,720	31,617	61,471	38,162	6,871	180,841	
Bill Thompson	21.5%	32.7%	27.2%	25.6%	32.1%		26.1%
Christine C. Quinn	52,102	10,392	23,007	19,847	3,545	108,893	
Christine C. Quinn	26.3%	10.7%	10.2%	13.3%	16.5%		15.7%
John C. Liu	10,191	4,753	13,927	16,977	1,438	47,286	
John C. Liu	5.1%	4.9%	6.2%	11.4%	6.7%		6.8%
Anthony D. Weiner	6,858	5,726	10,950	9,438	1,220	34,192	
Anthony D. Weiner	3.5%	5.9%	4.8%	6.3%	5.7%		4.9%
Erick J. Salgado	2,296	3,855	5,793	3,735	235	15,914	2.3%
Randy Credico	1,588	2,301	2,351	5,129	161	11,530	1.7%
Sal F. Albanese	821	581	2,346	1,648	447	5,843	0.8%
Neil V. Grimaldi	634	640	1,108	2,157	138	4,677	0.7%
All write-ins	50	18	172	21	20	281	0.04%
Total	198,458	96,780	225,829	149,305	21,434	691,801	100.0%
Borough percentage of city-wide Democratic vote	29%	14%	33%	22%	3%	100%	

Republican primary election, Tuesday, September 10, 2013,

In the Republican primary, Joe Lhota, a former deputy mayor and former chairman of the Metropolitan Transportation Authority carried every borough but Staten Island, which was won by John Catsimatidis, a businessman, publisher and property developer. Catsimatidis, in losing, won nearly as large a percentage of his own party's vote (40.69%) as the Democratic winner, Bill de Blasio won of his (40.81%). The 61,111 valid votes cast in the Republican primary were less than one-eleventh of the 691,801 cast in the Democratic one held on the same day in the same polling places.

From the Board of Elections in the City of New York, September 27, 2013

2013 Republican primary	Manhattan	The Bronx	Brooklyn	Queens	Staten Island	Total	%
Joe Lhota	9,211	1,860	6,995	8,758	5,412	32,236	52.7%
Joe Lhota	70.5%	52.9%	47.6%	51.0%	42.8%	32,236	52.7%
John Catsimatidis	3,139	1,281	6,723	6,945	6,776	24,864	40.7%
John Catsimatidis	24.0%	36.4%	45.7%	40.5%	53.5%	24,864	40.7%
George McDonald	683	369	940	1,456	451	3,899	6.4%
George McDonald	5.2%	10.5%	6.4%	8.5%	3.6%	3,899	6.4%
All write-in votes	34	8	42	9	19	112	0.2%
Total	13,067	3,518	14,700	17,168	12,658	61,111	100.0%
Borough percentage of city-wide Republican vote	21%	6%	24%	28%	21%	100%	

=== 2009 ===
The principal candidates were Mayor Michael Bloomberg, an independent running for the third time on the Republican and Independence Party lines, and New York City Comptroller Bill Thompson, running for the Democratic and Working Families Parties. Bloomberg had enjoyed pluralities of about 9% to 16% in most independent published pre-election polls and on Tuesday, November 3, he won his third term with 50.7% of votes over Thompson's 46%.

Other candidates included:

- Steven Christopher of Memorial Baptist Church in Brooklyn, Conservative Party of New York State
- Joseph Dobrian, Libertarian Party of New York
- Reverend Billy Talen of the Church of Life After Shopping, Green Party of New York
- Dan Fein, Socialist Workers Party
- Francisca Villar, Party for Socialism and Liberation
- Jimmy McMillan, Rent Is Too Damn High Party
- Tyrell Eiland, New Voice Party
- Jonny Porkpie, independent
- John M. Finan, independent

General election, Tuesday, November 3, 2009

2009 general election	Party	Manhattan	The Bronx	Brooklyn	Queens	Staten Island	Total	%
Bloomberg's margin over Mark Green (2001)		– 22,777	– 21,683	– 28,182	+ 46,904	+ 61,227	+ 35,489	+ 2.4%
change in Bloomberg's margin of victory, 2001–2005		+ 98,973	– 19,634	+ 97,622	+ 48,125	– 10,705	+ 214,381	+ 17.0%
Bloomberg's margin over Fernando Ferrer (2005)		+ 76,196	– 41,317	+ 69,440	+ 95,029	+ 50,522	+ 249,870	+ 19.4%
change in Bloomberg's margin of victory, 2005–2009		– 35,010	+ 6,268	– 91,392	– 59,742	– 19,397	– 199,273	– 15.0%
Bloomberg's margin over Bill Thompson (2009)		+ 41,186	– 35,049	– 21,952	+ 35,287	+ 31,125	+ 50,597	+ 4.4%
net change in Bloomberg's margin, 2001–2009		+ 63,963	– 13,366	+ 6,230	– 11,617	– 30,102	+ 15,108	+ 2.0%
Michael Bloomberg	Republican	102,903	42,066	117,706	126,569	46,149	435,393	37.7%
Michael Bloomberg	Republican	35.9%	29.0%	34.6%	42.3%	55.4%	435,393	37.7%
Michael Bloomberg	Independence/Jobs and Education	56,934	11,730	36,033	36,364	9,012	150,073	13.0%
Michael Bloomberg	Independence/Jobs and Education	19.9%	8.1%	10.6%	12.2%	10.8%	150,073	13.0%
Michael Bloomberg	Total	159,837	53,796	153,739	162,933	55,161	585,466	50.7%
Michael Bloomberg	Total	55.8%	37.0%	45.1%	54.5%	66.2%	585,466	50.7%
Bill Thompson	Democratic	110,975	86,899	163,230	122,935	22,956	506,995	43.9%
Bill Thompson	Democratic	38.7%	59.8%	47.9%	41.1%	27.5%	506,995	43.9%
Bill Thompson	Working Families	7,676	1,946	12,461	4,711	1,080	27,874	2.4%
Bill Thompson	Working Families	2.7%	1.3%	3.7%	1.6%	1.3%	27,874	2.4%
Bill Thompson	Total	118,651	88,845	175,691	127,646	24,036	534,869	46.3%
Bill Thompson	Total	41.4%	61.2%	51.6%	42.7%	28.8%	534,869	46.3%
Stephen Christopher	Conservative	2,217	1,480	5,690	5,267	3,359	18,013	1.6%
Stephen Christopher	Conservative	0.8%	1.0%	1.7%	1.8%	4.0%	18,013	1.6%
Billy Talen	Green	3,083	434	3,338	1,680	367	8,902	0.8%
Billy Talen	Green	1.1%	0.3%	1.0%	0.6%	0.4%	8,902	0.8%
Jimmy McMillan	Rent Is Too High	823	217	764	404	124	2,332	0.2%
Francisca Villar	Socialism and Liberation	674	253	577	420	72	1,996	0.2%
Joseph Dobrian	Libertarian	556	104	413	388	155	1,616	0.1%
Dan Fein	Socialist Workers	493	120	376	263	59	1,311	0.1%
Write-ins †		100	30	77	60	30	297	0.03%
Total recorded votes		286,434	145,279	340,665	299,061	83,363	1,154,802	100.00%
unrecorded ballots		5,172	3,659	6,645	6,254	1,525	23,255	
Total ballots cast		291,606	148,938	347,310	305,315	84,888	1,178,057	
† The three candidates who received more than seven write-in votes each were C. Montgomery Burns (Homer Simpson's fictional boss), 27; City Councilman Tony Avella (who lost the Democratic mayoral primary), 13; and former Mayor Rudy Giuliani (Republican), 11.
Source: Board of Elections in the City of New York Archived 2010-01-06 at the Wayback Machine, November 24, 2009

Democratic primary, Tuesday, September 15, 2009,

From the Board of Elections in the City of New York, September 26, 2009

2009 Democratic primary	Manhattan	The Bronx	Brooklyn	Queens	Staten Island	Total	%
Bill Thompson	70,881	31,950	75,519	49,063	7,484	234,897	71.0%
Bill Thompson	73.7%	73.5%	73.9%	63.2%	67.0%	234,897	71.0%
Tony Avella	18,213	7,754	17,945	22,903	2,959	69,774	21.1%
Tony Avella	18.9%	17.8%	17.6%	29.5%	26.5%	69,774	21.1%
Roland Rogers	6,975	3,751	8,612	5,553	700	25,591	7.7%
Roland Rogers	7.3%	8.6%	8.4%	7.2%	6.3%	25,591	7.7%
all write-in votes	127	10	153	81	26	397	0.1%
all write-in votes	0.1%	0.02%	0.1%	0.1%	0.2%	397	0.1%
Total	96,196	43,465	102,229	77,600	11,169	330,659	

Tony Avella represents a Queens district on the New York City Council. Out of the nearly 400 write-in votes, almost half or 184 (representing about one Democratic voter in 2,000) were some form or spelling of Mayor Michael Bloomberg.

=== 2005 ===
In 2005, Mayor Bloomberg won every borough but The Bronx (of which his Democratic opponent was the former Borough President) against a Democratic Party split by a divisive primary, in contrast to his first victory in 2001, when Bloomberg carried only Queens and Staten Island.

2005	Party	Manhattan	The Bronx	Brooklyn	Queens	Staten Island	Total	%
change in Bloomberg's margin of victory, 2001–2005		+ 98,973	– 19,634	+ 97,622	+ 48,125	– 10,705	+ 214,381	+ 17.0%
Bloomberg's margin over Mark Green (2001)		– 22,777	– 21,683	– 28,182	+ 46,904	+ 61,227	+ 35,489	+ 2.4%
Bloomberg's margin over Ferrer (2005)		+ 76,196	– 41,317	+ 69,440	+ 95,029	+ 50,522	+ 249,870	+ 19.4%
Michael Bloomberg	Republican/Liberal	171,593	69,577	189,581	184,426	63,267	678,444	52.6%
Michael Bloomberg	Republican/Liberal	52.6%	35.3%	52.7%	57.9%	71.5%	678,444	52.6%
Michael Bloomberg	Independence	25,416	6,840	20,141	17,689	4,559	74,645	5.8%
Michael Bloomberg	Independence	7.8%	3.5%	5.6%	5.6%	5.2%	74,645	5.8%
Michael Bloomberg	Total	197,010	76,417	209,723	202,116	67,827	753,089	58.4%
Michael Bloomberg	Total	60.4%	38.8%	58.2%	63.5%	76.7%	753,089	58.4%
Fernando Ferrer	Democratic	120,813	117,734	140,282	107,086	17,304	503,219	39.0%
Fernando Ferrer	Democratic	37.0%	59.8%	39.0%	33.6%	19.6%	503,219	39.0%
Thomas V. Ognibene	Conservative	1,729	1,185	3,573	5,645	2,498	14,630	1.1%
Anthony Gronowicz	Green	3,195	466	3,112	1,285	239	8,297	0.6%
Jimmy McMillan	Rent Is Too Damn High	1,369	474	1,293	799	176	4,111	0.3%
Audrey Silk	Libertarian	991	234	841	617	205	2,888	0.2%
Martin Koppel	Socialist Workers	758	231	766	384	117	2,256	0.2%
Seth A Blum	Education	322	131	382	264	77	1,176	0.1%
Write-ins		109	1	90	57	12	269	.02%
colspan=2								
Total		326,295	196,873	360,061	318,252	88,454	1,289,935	

Source: Board of Elections in the City of New York http://www.vote.nyc.ny.us/results.html

=== 2001 ===
The 2001 mayoral election was held on Tuesday, November 6.

Republican incumbent Rudy Giuliani could not run again due to term limits. As Democrats outnumber Republicans by 5 to 1 in the city, it was widely believed that a Democrat would succeed him in City Hall. However, billionaire Michael Bloomberg, a lifelong Democrat, changed his party affiliation a few months before the election in order to avoid a crowded primary, and ran as a Republican. The Democratic primary was meant to be held on September 11 but was postponed due to the September 11 attacks; it was instead held on September 25. The primary opened the way to a bitter run-off between the Bronx-born Puerto Rican Fernando Ferrer, and Mark Green, a non-Hispanic who attacked Ferrer's close ties to Rev. Al Sharpton, leaving the party divided along racial lines.

Bloomberg spent $74 million on his election campaign, which was a record amount at the time for a non-presidential election (Bloomberg would break his own record in 2005). Thanks also in part to active support from Giuliani, whose approval ratings shot up after the September 11 attacks, Bloomberg won a very close general election.

2001 general election	Party	Manhattan	The Bronx	Brooklyn	Queens	Staten Island	Total	%
Bloomberg's margin over Green		– 22,777	– 21,683	– 28,182	+ 46,904	+ 61,227	+ 35,489	+ 2.4%
Michael Bloomberg	Republican	162,096	72,551	174,053	196,241	80,725	685,666	46.3%
Michael Bloomberg	Independence	17,701	8,046	14,987	14,191	4,166	59,091	4.0%
Michael Bloomberg	Total	179,797	80,597	189,040	210,432	84,891	744,757	50.3%
Michael Bloomberg	Total	46.1%	43.1%	45.7%	55.3%	77.1%	744,757	50.3%
Mark Green	Democratic	193,372	97,087	206,005	157,897	22,356	676,717	45.7%
Mark Green	Working Families	9,202	5,193	11,217	5,631	1,308	32,551	2.2%
Mark Green	Total	202,574	102,280	217,222	163,528	23,664	709,268	47.9%
Mark Green	Total	52.0%	54.7%	52.5%	43.0%	21.5%	709,268	47.9%
Alan G. Hevesi	Liberal	2,684	847	2,124	1,886	486	8,027	0.5%
Alan G. Hevesi	Better Schools	416	772	628	407	81	2,304	0.2%
Alan G. Hevesi	Total	3,100	1,619	2,752	2,293	567	10,331	0.7%
Julia Willebrand	Green	2,241	670	2,456	1,579	209	7,155	0.5%
Terrance M. Gray	Conservative	507	642	844	1,219	365	3,577	0.2%
Thomas K. Leighton	Marijuana Reform	791	529	680	418	145	2,563	0.2%
Kenny Kramer	Libertarian	368	296	338	306	100	1,408	0.1%
Bernhard H. Goetz	Fusion	203	201	333	253	59	1,049	0.1%
Kenneth B. Golding	American Dream	96	112	163	81	22	474	.03%
Scattered votes		114	57	26	106	29	332	.02%
colspan=2								
Total recorded vote		389,791	187,003	413,854	380,215	110,051	1,480,914	(100.0%)
(unrecorded votes)		9,186	6,125	12,097	10,285	1,836	39,529	
Total vote		398,977	193,128	425,951	390,500	111,887	1,520,443	

Democratic primary runoff
	Manhattan	The Bronx	Brooklyn	Queens	Staten Island	Total
Mark Green	131,438	38,256	120,781	94,342	18,183	403,000
Fernando Ferrer	86,579	106,086	109,831	77,330	7,193	387,019
						790,019

Democratic primary
	Manhattan	The Bronx	Brooklyn	Queens	Staten Island	Total
Fernando Ferrer	60,839	86,571	77,516	49,441	5,084	279,451
Mark Green	83,856	26,125	77,805	49,692	5,704	243,182
Peter F. Vallone (Sr.)	25,296	18,268	51,210	48,576	11,842	155,192
Alan G. Hevesi	32,925	6,066	25,110	27,163	3,504	94,768
George N. Spitz	1,558	1,264	2,923	2,489	283	8,517
						785,365

Republican primary
	Manhattan	The Bronx	Brooklyn	Queens	Staten Island	Total
Michael Bloomberg	10,959	3,230	10,168	14,543	9,155	48,055
Herman Badillo	4,161	1,838	4,153	5,700	2,624	18,476
						72,961

=== 1997 ===
1997 general election	Party	Manhattan	The Bronx	Brooklyn	Queens	Staten Island	Total	%
Rudy Giuliani	Republican-Liberal	171,080	84,440	207,277	234,851	86,167	783,815	57.7%
Rudy Giuliani	Republican-Liberal	50.9%	43.6%	53.3%	64.6%	78.6%	783,815	57.7%
Ruth Messinger	Democratic	149,009	104,787	165,699	115,175	14,665	549,335	40.5%
Ruth Messinger	Democratic	47.1%	54.8%	44.7%	33.7%	17.9%	549,335	40.5%
All others		5,696	2,773	7,062	5,764	3,003	24,398	1.9%
All others		1.7%	1.4%	1.9%	1.6%	2.9%	24,398	1.9%
Total		325,785	192,000	380,038	355,790	103,835	1,357,448	100%

Notes: Giuliani vote was 748,277 Republican and 35,538 Liberal. Other votes were Sal Albanese -Independence-14,316 1.1%; Peter Gaffney-Right to Life-5,304 0.5%; Olga Rodriguez-Socialist Workers-3,753 0.3%; Dominick Fusco-Fusion- 632; scattered 293

- In the Democratic primary, Messinger defeated Rev. Al Sharpton, Sal Albanese and two others, avoiding a runoff election.

The vote was: Messenger-165,377 40.2%; Sharpton-131,848 32.0%; Albanese-86,485 21.0%; Eric Melendez-17,633 4.3%; Roland Rogers-10,086 2.5%

== Past elections ==
=== 1993 ===
General election
		Manhattan	The Bronx	Brooklyn	Queens	Staten Island	Total
change in Giuliani margin		+ 21,433	+ 8,256	+ 27,786	+ 16,428	+ 26,517	+ 100,447
Giuliani – Dinkins, 1989		– 97,600	– 72,471	– 39,071	+ 94,670	+ 67,392	– 47,080
Giuliani – Dinkins, 1993		– 76,167	– 64,215	– 11,285	+ 111,098	+ 93,909	+ 53,367
Republican – Liberal	Rudy Giuliani	166,357	98,780	258,058	291,625	115,416	930,236
Democratic	David N. Dinkins	242,524	162,995	269,343	180,527	21,507	876,869
Conservative – Right to Life	George J. Marlin	2462	2098	3995	5258	2113	15,926
							1,827,465

The Giuliani vote included 867,767 Republican and 62,469 Liberal. Marlin vote included 9,433 Conservative and 6,493 Right to Life. In addition, there were 2,229 votes for J. Brennan-Libertarian; 2,061 votes for M. Bockman – Socialist Workers and 117 scattered votes.

Dinkins won the Democratic primary with 336,285 votes to 126,449 for Roy Innis and 35,492 for Eric Melendez.

=== 1989 ===
General election
		Manhattan	The Bronx	Brooklyn	Queens	Staten Island	Total
Dinkins' lead over Giuliani		+ 97,600	+ 72,471	+ 39,071	– 94,670	– 67,392	+ 47,080
Democratic	David N. Dinkins	255,286	172,271	276,903	190,096	22,988	917,544
Republican – Liberal – Independent	Rudy Giuliani	157,686	99,800	237,832	284,766	90,380	870,464
Right to Life	Henry Hewes	3,025	2,571	4,140	5,647	2,077	17,460
Conservative	Ronald S. Lauder	1,701	1,139	2,328	3,062	1,041	9,271
	Others	1,904	714	1,197	947	194	4,956
							1,819,695

Giuliani vote was 815,387 Republican and 55,077 Liberal.

Other vote was 1,732 Lenora Fulani-New Alliance; 1,671-James Harris-Socialist Workers; 1,118 Warren Raum-Libertarian; 435 Mazelis-Workers League.

Democratic primary
	Manhattan	The Bronx	Brooklyn	Queens	Staten Island	Total
David N. Dinkins	151,113	101,274	170,440	113,952	11,122	547,901
Ed Koch	96,923	66,600	139,268	129,262	24,260	456,313
Harrison J. Goldin	6,889	4,951	9,619	5,857	1,493	28,809
Richard Ravitch	17,499	5,946	13,214	9,443	1,432	47,534

Giuliani won the Republican Primary, defeating Ron Lauder 77,150 (67.0%) to 37,960 (33.0%)

=== 1985 ===
General election
		Manhattan	The Bronx	Brooklyn	Queens	Staten Island	Total
Democratic – Independent	Ed Koch	171,582	137,472	248,585	248,041	62,580	868,260
Liberal	Carol Bellamy	41,190	14,092	29,256	25,098	3,835	113,471
Republican – Conservative	Diane McGrath	17,491	12,358	25,738	36,032	10,049	101,668
	others						29,397
							1,112,796

The Koch vote include 862,226 Democratic and 6,034 Independent votes. The McGrath vote was 79,508 Republican and 22,160 Conservative. Other vote was: Yehuda Levin – Right to Life – 14,517; Lenora Fulani – New Alliance – 7,597;Jarvis Tyner – People Before Profits – 3,370; Andrea Gonzalez – Socialist Workers – 1,677; Gilbert DiLucia – Coalition – 1,135; Marjorie Stanberg – Spartacist – 1,101; scattered – 9

Koch won the Democratic primary: Koch-436,151 64.0%; Bellamy – 127,690 18.7%; Denny Farrell – 89,845 13.2%; DiLucia – 11, 627 1.7%; Fred Newman – 8,584 1.2%; Judah Rubenstein – 8,057 1.2%

=== 1981 ===
General election
		Manhattan	The Bronx	Brooklyn	Queens	Staten Island	Total
Democratic – Republican	Ed Koch	189,631	132,421	261,292	275,812	53,466	912,622
Unity	Frank J. Barbaro	56,702	22,074	48,812	31,225	3,906	162,719
Liberal	Mary Codd	14,228	5,902	7,958	8,795	4,835	41,718
Conservative	John Esposito	6,682	7,634	15,388	26,515	3,881	60,100
							1,222,644

Koch had 738,288 Democratic votes and 174,334 Republican votes. Others = 45,485. Jeronimo Dominguez – Right to Life – 32,790 2.7%; Judith Jones – Libertarian – 6,902 0.6%; Wells Todd – Socialist Workers – 5,793 0.5% Koch won the Democratic primary with 347,351 votes (59.8%), defeating Barbaro who had 209,369 votes (36.0%) and Melvin Klenetsky who had 24,352 votes (4.2%). Koch also won the Republican Primary, defeating Esposito by 44,724 to 22,354.

=== 1977 ===
In his 2005 book Ladies and Gentlemen, The Bronx Is Burning, historian Jonathan Mahler argues that the New York City blackout of 1977, with its accompanying rioting, enabled the law-and-order advocate Ed Koch to beat out his more left-wing opponents, including incumbent mayor Abe Beame, in the 1977 election.

Ed Koch was just 181 voices (0.013%) short from majority. As of 2024, 1977 NYC mayor election is the last one won by simple plurality (though Dinkins in 1989, Guliani in 1993 and Bloomberg twice in 2001 and 2009 won with tiny majority of 50.3-50.7% of valid votes).

General election
		Manhattan	The Bronx	Brooklyn	Queens	Staten Island	Total
Democratic	Ed Koch	184,842	116,436	204,934	191,894	19,270	717,376
Liberal – Neighborhood Government	Mario M. Cuomo	77,531	87,421	173,321	208,748	40,932	587,913
Republican	Roy M. Goodman	19,321	6,102	11,491	18,460	3,229	58,606
Conservative	Barry M. Farber	9,070	7,624	16,576	20,453	3,714	57,437
others		4,281	1,731	3,752	3,256	761	13,781
							1,435,113

Other vote was: Kenneth F. Newcombe – Communist – 5,300; Catarino Garza – Socialist Workers – 3,294; Vito Battista – United Taxpayers Party – 2,119; Louis Wein – Independent – 1,127; William Lawry – Free Libertarian – 1,068; Elijah Boyd – Labor – 873. Cuomo's total vote included 522,942 Liberal and 64,971 Neighborhood Government.

1977 Democratic primary runoff
	Manhattan	The Bronx	Brooklyn	Queens	Staten Island	Total
Ed Koch	115,251	69,612	131,271	107,033	9,835	433,002
Mario M. Cuomo	61,570	55,355	112,587	105,522	19,799	354,833
						787,835

1977 Democratic primary
	Manhattan	The Bronx	Brooklyn	Queens	Staten Island	Total
Ed Koch	50,806	23,453	49,470	52,002	5,812	181,544
Mario M. Cuomo	25,331	23,028	54,845	56,698	10,430	170,332
Abraham D. Beame	23,758	25,747	63,304	44,607	7,337	164,753
Bella Abzug	56,045	20,435	37,236	33,883	4,314	151,913
Percy Sutton	35,012	24,801	42,903	28,525	1,399	132,640
Herman Badillo	27,193	35,007	28,909	9,051	876	101,036
						902,218

Runoff-Koch-433,002 55.0%; Cuomo-354,833 45.0% Total vote 787,835 Manhattan-Koch-115,251 65.2%; Cuomo—61,570 34.8% Bronx-----Koch-69,612 55.7%; Cuomo—55,355 44.3% Brooklyn—Koch-131,271 53.8%; Cuomo—112,587 46.2% Queens----Koch-107,033 50.4%; Cuomo—105,522 49.6% Staten----Koch-9,835 33.1%; Cuomo—19,799 66.9%

Note that the eventual winner, Rep. Ed Koch, could not win a plurality in any of the Five Boroughs for the initial Democratic primary. Rep. Bella Abzug took Manhattan, Mayor Abe Beame Brooklyn, Rep. Herman Badillo the Bronx, and NY Sec. of State Mario Cuomo Queens & Staten Island. In the Democratic run-off with Cuomo, Koch took Queens and three other boroughs, leaving Cuomo with only Staten Island. In the general election, Cuomo kept Staten Island and won back Queens, but lost the other three boroughs (Manhattan, Brooklyn and The Bronx) to Koch.

In the Republican primary, Roy M. Goodman, a member of the New York State Senate, defeated Barry Farber, a radio commentator, by a vote of 41,131 to 31,078(57.0% to 43.0%). Farber, however, won the nomination of the Conservative Party of New York and won almost as many votes in the general election (57,437 or 4.0%) as Goodman did as the Republican nominee (58,606 or 4.1%).

== 1929 to 1973 ==
Some figures and anecdotes courtesy James Trager's New York Chronology (HarperCollins: 2003). Other numbers are from The World Almanac and Book of Facts, then published by The New York World-Telegram (Scripps-Howard), for 1943 (page 412) and 1957 (page 299), and from The Encyclopedia of New York City (see Sources below).

Before 1975, the present Borough of Staten Island was formally known as the Borough of Richmond.

=== 1973 ===
1973 general election	Party	Manhattan	The Bronx	Brooklyn	Queens	Richmond [Staten Is.]	Total	%
Abraham Beame	Democratic – Civil Service & Fusion	159,531	161,156	322,141	283,145	37,569	963,542	56.5%
Abraham Beame	Democratic – Civil Service & Fusion	49.8%	57.3%	63.6%	56.7%	47.1%	963,542	56.5%
John Marchi	Republican -Integrity	44,200	37,287	73,328	90,860	28,377	274,052	16.1%
John Marchi	Republican -Integrity	13.8%	13.3%	14.5%	18.2%	35.6%	274,052	16.1%
Albert H. Blumenthal	Liberal – Good Government	99,816	32,305	59,417	66,056	5,006	262,600	15.4%
Albert H. Blumenthal	Liberal – Good Government	31.2%	11.5%	11.7%	13.2%	6.3%	262,600	15.4%
Mario Biaggi	Conservative – Safe City	16,662	50,440	51,391	59,691	8,793	186,977	11.0%
Mario Biaggi	Conservative – Safe City	5.2%	17.9%	10.2%	11.9%	11.0%	186,977	11.0%
subtotal		320,209	281,188	506,277	499,752	79,745	1,687,171	98.9
others		colspan=5	18,463	1.1%				
Total							1,705,634	

note: All the candidates except Marchi had run in the Democratic primary. Candidates votes on their second ballot lines included above were: Beame-Civil Service & Fusion −67,277; Marchi-Integrity – 14,271; Blumenthal – Good Government – 29, 335; Biaggi – Safe City – 8,010. Other vote includes 8,818 Fran Youngstein – Free Libertarian Party; 3,601 Rasheed Storey – Communist; 2,282 Norman Oliver – Socialist Workers; 2,000 Anton Chaiken -Labor; 1,762 John Emanuel – Socialist Labor

1973 Democratic initial primary	Manhattan	The Bronx	Brooklyn	Queens	Richmond [Staten Is.]	Total	%
Abraham Beame	46,519	42,537	98,121	74,223	9,021	270,421	34%
Abraham Beame	26%	27%	41%	40%	42%	270,421	34%
Herman Badillo	74,496	57,258	58,546	34,742	2,977	228,019	29%
Herman Badillo	41%	36%	25%	19%	14%	228,019	29%
Albert H. Blumenthal	41,794	18,713	32,412	29,173	1,814	123,906	16%
Albert H. Blumenthal	23%	12%	14%	16%	8%	123,906	16%
Mario Biaggi	18,218	39,893	48,952	45,949	7,775	160,787	21%
Mario Biaggi	10%	25%	21%	25%	36%	160,787	21%
bgcolor=f8f8d8|[100%]

1973 Democratic run-off primary	Manhattan	The Bronx	Brooklyn	Queens	Richmond [Staten Is.]	Total	%
Abraham Beame	78,760	96,590	200,945	153,377	17,844	547,626	60.8%
Abraham Beame	41%	53%	69%	73%	79%	547,626	60.8%
Herman Badillo	113,738	85,827	91,628	56,933	4,796	352,912	39.2%
Herman Badillo	59%	47%	32%	27%	21%	352,912	39.2%
Total	192,598	182,417	292,573	210,310	22,640	900.538	

=== 1969 ===
Note: In one of the most unusual primary seasons since the conglomeration of greater New York, the incumbent Mayor (Lindsay) and a former incumbent (Robert F. Wagner Jr.) both lost their parties' primaries. Procaccino won with less than 33% of the vote against four opponents, which inspired the use of runoffs in future primaries. In the general election, Lindsay carried Manhattan (the only borough he had carried in losing the Republican primary to Marchi, 107,000 to 113,000) as he did in 1965, but he was only 4,000 votes ahead of giving first place in Queens to Procaccino. Turnout dropped to 2.4 million from 2.6 million in 1965. (In the same election, Lindsay's 1965 opponent Abe Beame, was easily returned to his old job of comptroller.)

The New York Mets' unlikely win in the 1969 World Series and Mayor Lindsay's participation in their postgame celebration may have given the Mayor a late public relations boost which contributed to his victory.

1969 general election	Party	Manhattan	The Bronx	Brooklyn	Queens	Richmond [Staten Is.]	Total	%
John Lindsay	Liberal – Independent	328,564	161,953	256,046	249,330	16,740	1,012,633	42.4%
John Lindsay	Liberal – Independent	67.1%	40.1%	36.0%	36.3%	17.5%	1,012,633	42.4%
Mario Procaccino	Democratic – Civil Service Fusion	99,460	165,647	301,324	245,783	19,558	831,772	34.8%
Mario Procaccino	Democratic – Civil Service Fusion	20.3%	41.0%	42.4%	35.8%	20.5%	831,772	34.8%
John Marchi	Republican – Conservative	61,539	76,711	152,933	192,008	59,220	542,411	22.7%
John Marchi	Republican – Conservative	12.6%	19.0%	21.5%	27.9%	62.0%	542,411	22.7%
subtotal		489,563	404,311	710,303	687,121	95,518	2,386,816	99.8%
Rasheed Storey	Communist						4,018	0.2%
Total							2,390,834	100.0%

- The Lindsay vote was 872,660 Liberal (36.5%) and 139,973 Independent (5.9%).
- Procaccino's vote was 774,708 Democratic (32.4%) and 57,064 Civil Service Fusion (2.4%).
- The Marchi vote was 329,506 Republican (13.8%) and 212,905 Conservative (8.9%).
- By themselves, the straight Democratic and Republican lines added up to less than 50% of the mayoral vote (1,104,214 or 46.2%), but more than the total vote for Lindsay (1,012,633 or 42.4%).
- Procaccino's general election votes on the Democratic line alone (774,708) were slightly fewer than the total votes received by all candidates in the Democratic primary (777,796).
- Lindsay's general election votes on the Liberal line alone (872,660) exceeded Procaccino's total votes on all lines (831,772).

1969 Republican primary
	Manhattan	The Bronx	Brooklyn	Queens	Staten Island	Total
[Lindsay minus Marchi]	+ 31,779	– 3,910	– 13,119	– 13,811	– 7,271	– 6,332
John Lindsay	44,236	12,222	20,575	26,658	3,675	107,366
John J. Marchi	12,457	16,132	33,694	40,649	10,946	113,698
						221,064

1969 Democratic primary
	Manhattan	The Bronx	Brooklyn	Queens	Staten Island	Total
Mario Procaccino	26,804	50,465	87,650	79,002	11,628	255,529
percentage	16%	34%	36%	40%	52%	33%
Robert F. Wagner Jr.	40,978	33,442	81,833	61,244	6,967	224,464
percentage	25%	23%	33%	31%	31%	29%
Herman Badillo	74,809	48,841	52,866	37,880	2,769	217,165
percentage	45%	33%	22%	19%	12%	28%
Norman Mailer	17,372	4,214	10,299	8,700	703	41,288
percentage	10%	3%	4%	4%	3%	5%
James H. Scheuer	7,117	10,788	11,942	8,994	509	39,350
percentage	4%	7%	5%	5%	2%	5%
						777,796

=== 1965 ===
1965 general election	Party	Manhattan	The Bronx	Brooklyn	Queens	Richmond [Staten Is.]	Total	%
John Lindsay	Republican – Liberal – Independent Citizens	291,326	181,072	308,398	331,162	37,148	1,149,106	45.0%
John Lindsay	Republican – Liberal – Independent Citizens	55.8%	39.5%	40.0%	47.1%	45.8%	1,149,106	45.0%
Abraham Beame	Democratic – Civil Service Fusion	193,230	213,980	365,360	250,662	23,467	1,046,699	41.0%
Abraham Beame	Democratic – Civil Service Fusion	37.0%	46.6%	47.4%	35.6%	28.9%	1,046,699	41.0%
William F. Buckley Jr.	Conservative	37,694	63,858	97,679	121,544	20,451	341,226	13.4%
William F. Buckley Jr.	Conservative	7.2%	13.9%	12.7%	17.3%	25.2%	341,226	13.4%
subtotal		522,250	458,910	771,437	703,368	81,066	2,537,031	99.4%
others							17,168	0.6%
Total							2,554,199	

Almost a quarter of Lindsay's vote (281,796) was on the Liberal Party line, while 63,590 of Beame's votes were on the Civil Service Fusion line. John Lindsay, a Republican Congressman from the "Silk-Stocking" District on the Upper East Side of Manhattan, carried Manhattan, Queens, and traditionally Republican Staten Island (Richmond), while Abe Beame, the city comptroller, carried The Bronx and his home borough of Brooklyn, both of which he had also won in the Democratic primary. However, while Beame had also carried Queens in the primary, he lost it to Lindsay in the general election. (Five years later, Bill Buckley's brother James L. Buckley would win the 1970 New York state election for U.S. Senator on the Conservative Party line against divided opposition.) The Other vote was 11,104- Vito Battista – United Taxpayer Party; 3,977- Clifton DeBerry – Socialist Workers; 2,087 – Eric Haas – Socialist Labor

1965 Democratic primary
	Manhattan	The Bronx	Brooklyn	Queens	Staten Island	Total
Abraham D. Beame	53,386	66,064	128,146	82,601	6,148	336,345
Paul R. Screvane	66,444	54,260	79,485	63,680	7,512	271,381
William F. Ryan	48,744	16,632	24,588	22,570	1,204	113,738
Paul O'Dwyer	6,771	5,976	8,332	6,895	697	28,675
						750,139

=== 1961 ===
Mayor Wagner broke with the regular Democratic organization which had supported him in 1953 and 1957, defeating their candidate, Arthur Levitt, in the Democratic primary 61% to 39%. At the same time, after running successfully with Lawrence Gerosa for Comptroller in the previous two elections, Wagner chose to run instead with Abraham Beame in 1961. Gerosa ran against Wagner for mayor as the "real Democrat" on a pro-taxpayer platform. 211,000 of Wagner's 1,237,000 votes came on the Liberal Party line, and 55,000 on the purpose-built Brotherhood line.

1961 general election	Party	Manhattan	The Bronx	Brooklyn	Queens	Richmond [Staten Is.]	Total	%
Robert F. Wagner Jr.	Democratic – Liberal – Brotherhood	265,015	255,528	396,539	290,194	30,145	1,237,421	51.03%
Robert F. Wagner Jr.	Democratic – Liberal – Brotherhood	55.6%	55.8%	52.7%	45.8%	41.0%	1,237,421	51.03%
Louis Lefkowitz	Republican – Nonpartisan – Civic Action	174,471	134,964	251,258	243,836	31,162	835,691	34.46%
Louis Lefkowitz	Republican – Nonpartisan – Civic Action	36.6%	29.5%	33.4%	38.5%	42.3%	835,691	34.46%
Lawrence E. Gerosa	Independent – Citizens' Party	36,893	67,213	105,232	99,987	12,279	321,604	13.26%
Lawrence E. Gerosa	Independent – Citizens' Party	7.7%	14.7%	14.0%	15.8%	16.7%	321,604	13.26%
subtotal		476,379	457,705	753,029	634,017	73,586	2,394,716	98.75%
others							30,269	1.25%
Total							2,424,985	

Other vote was: Vito Battista – United Taxpayers Party – 19,960; Richard Garza – Socialist Workers – 7,037; Eric Haas – Socialist Labor – 3,272

1961 Democratic primary	Manhattan	The Bronx	Brooklyn	Queens	Richmond [Staten Is.]	Total	%
Robert F. Wagner Jr.	122,607	78,626	136,440	102,845	15,498	456,016	60.9%
Robert F. Wagner Jr.	65%	62%	57%	62%	60%	456,016	60.9%
Arthur Levitt	66,917	47,885	103,296	64,157	10,471	292,726	39.1%
Arthur Levitt	35%	38%	43%	38%	40%	292,726	39.1%
subtotal (for Wagner and Levitt only)	189,524	126,511	239,736	167,002	25,969	748,742	[100%]

=== 1957 ===
1957	Party	Manhattan	The Bronx	Brooklyn	Queens	Richmond [Staten Is.]	Total	%
Robert F. Wagner Jr.	Democratic – Liberal – Fusion	316,203	316,299	495,078	341,212	40,983	1,509,775	69.2%
Robert F. Wagner Jr.	Democratic – Liberal – Fusion	73.8%	76.6%	75.1%	64.1%	64.7%	1,509,775	69.2%
Robert Christenberry	Republican	112,173	96,726	163,427	191,061	22,381	585,768	26.9%
Robert Christenberry	Republican	26.2%	23.4%	24.9%	35.9%	35.3%	585,768	26.9%
Vito P. Battista	United Taxpayers	7,976	11,417	28,921	17,757	1,205	67,266	3.1%
Total							2,179,878	

Other vote was:

Joyce Cowley – Socialist Workers – 13,453 0.6%; Eric Haas – Socialist Labor- 4,611 0.2%

=== 1953 ===
	Party	Manhattan	The Bronx	Brooklyn	Queens	Richmond [Staten Is.]	Total	%
Robert F. Wagner Jr.	Democratic	236,960	206,771	339,970	207,918	31,007	1,022,626	46.3%
Robert F. Wagner Jr.	Democratic	47.9%	46.2%	46.6%	40.6%	51.8%	1,022,626	46.3%
Harold Riegelman	Republican	147,876	97,224	183,968	208,829	23,694	661,591	30.0%
Harold Riegelman	Republican	29.9%	21.7%	25.2%	40.8%	39.6%	661,591	30.0%
Rudolph Halley	Liberal	76,884	112,825	162,275	73,192	3,514	428,690	19.4%
Rudolph Halley	Independent	7,648	9,853	13,264	7,356	295	38,416	1.7%
Rudolph Halley	Total	84,532	122,678	175,539	80,548	3,809	467,106	21.1%
Rudolph Halley	Total	17.1%	27.4%	24.1%	15.7%	6.4%	467,106	21.1%
Clifford T. McAvoy	American Labor Party	14,904	13,290	17,337	7,182	332	53,045	2.4%
Total							2,671,474	

Total vote was 2,207,516 Other vote was David L. Weiss-Socialist Workers-2,054 (0.1%);Nathan Karp-Industrial Government-916; scattered-180. "Industrial Government" is a ballot title sometimes used, to avoid confusion or to meet election laws, by the Socialist Labor Party. The Liberal Party of New York won over five times as many votes as the American Labor Party in Manhattan, and eight-to-ten times as many in the other boroughs. The ALP lost its ballot status after the 1954 governor's race, and voted to dissolve itself in 1956.

=== 1950 ===
1950	Party	Manhattan	The Bronx	Brooklyn	Queens	Richmond [Staten Is.]	Total	%
Vincent Impellitteri	Experience	246,608	215,913	357,322	303,448	37,884	1,161,175	44.2%
Vincent Impellitteri	Experience	40.4%	41.3%	40.5%	55.5%	60.0%	1,161,175	44.2%
Ferdinand Pecora	Democratic	166,240	157,537	271,670	104,734	11,177	711,358	27.1%
Ferdinand Pecora	Liberal	48,370	59,717	90,576	24,489	841	223,993	8.5%
Ferdinand Pecora	Total	214,610	217,254	362,246	129,223	12,018	935,351	35.6%
Ferdinand Pecora	Total	35.1%	41.6%	41.0%	23.6%	19.0%	935,351	35.6%
Edward Corsi	Republican	102,575	54,796	113,392	99,225	12,384	382,372	14.6%
Edward Corsi	Republican	16.8%	10.5%	12.8%	18.1%	19.6%	382,372	14.6%
Paul Ross	American Labor Party	47,201	34,575	49,999	14,904	899	147,578	5.6%
Total		610,994	522,538	882,959	546,800	63,185	2,626,476	

Vincent Impellitteri, the mayor who succeeded mid-term after William O'Dwyer resigned on August 31, 1950, swept Manhattan, Queens and Staten Island in this special election, while Ferdinand Pecora (aided by the Liberal Party) took very narrow leads in The Bronx and Brooklyn. In this election, the Liberals heavily outpolled the American Labor Party in every borough but Manhattan and Staten Island, where the two parties' votes were almost equal.

=== 1949 ===
1949	Party	Manhattan	The Bronx	Brooklyn	Queens	Richmond [Staten Is.]	Total	%
William O'Dwyer	Democratic	278,343	254,014	425,225	270,062	38,868	1,266,512	48.9%
William O'Dwyer	Democratic	44.8%	48.7%	48.8%	53.4%	64.5%	1,266,512	48.9%
Newbold Morris	Republican – Liberal – Fusion	219,430	185,248	332,433	200,552	18,406	956,069	36.9%
Newbold Morris	Republican – Liberal – Fusion	35.3%	35.5%	38.2%	39.7%	30.6%	956,069	36.9%
Vito Marcantonio	American Labor	123,128	82,386	113,478	34,677	2,957	356,626	13.8%
Vito Marcantonio	American Labor	19.8%	15.8%	13.0%	6.9%	4.9%	356,626	13.8%
Subtotal		620,901	521,648	871,136	505,291	60,231	2,579,207	99.6%
Others							12,477	0.4%
Total							2,591,684	

Other vote was: Eric Haas – Industrial Government – 7,857; Joseph G. Glass – Socialist – 3,396; Michael Bartell – Socialist Workers – 1,224. The Morris vote was 570,713 Republican, 373,287 Liberal and 12,069 Fusion

=== 1945 ===
1945	Party	Manhattan	The Bronx	Brooklyn	Queens	Richmond [Staten Is.]	Total	%
William O'Dwyer	Democratic – American Labor	253,371	227,818	386,335	228,275	29,558	1,125,357	55.3%
William O'Dwyer	Democratic – American Labor	55.8%	55.3%	56.8%	61.5%	66.3%	1,125,357	55.3%
Jonah J. Goldstein	Republican – Liberal – Fusion	100,591	95,582	161,119	65,240	9,069	431,601	21.2%
Jonah J. Goldstein	Republican – Liberal – Fusion	22.2%	23.2%	23.6%	17.6%	21.8%	431,601	21.2%
Newbold Morris	No Deal	100,064	88,404	136,262	77,687	5,931	408,348	20.6%
Newbold Morris	No Deal	22.0%	21.5%	19.9%	20.9%	13.3%	408,348	20.6%
Subtotal		454,026	411,804	683,716	371,202	44,558	1,965,306	99.1%
Others							17,055	0.9%
Total							1,982,361	

O'Dwyer received 867,426 Democratic votes and 257,929 on the American Labor Party line. The Goldstein vote was 301,144 Republican, 122,316 Liberal and 8,141 City Fusion. The No Deal Party (according to Chris McNickle in The Encyclopedia of New York City) was founded by the retiring maverick Republican Mayor Fiorello La Guardia to draw Republican votes towards Newbold Morris and away from the official Republican Party with whom La Guardia was having a dispute. The No Deal Party dissolved soon after the 1945 election. Newbold Morris was a Republican, while Jonah Goldstein was a Democrat until nomination day. Other vote was: Joseph G. Glass – Socialist – 9,304; Farrell Dobbs – Trotskyist Anti-War – 3,656; Eric Hass – Socialist Labor – 3,465; Max Shachtman – Workers – 585; scattered – 45.

=== 1941 ===
As in 1937, more voters in every borough voted on the Democratic line than on any other single line; but this time (unlike 1937) the Democrat carried Queens and Staten Island over La Guardia, shrinking the Mayor's overall citywide percentage lead from 20% to 6%. As in 1937, La Guardia's overall margin of victory depended on the American Labor Party, which again won more votes than the Republicans in The Bronx. While the total vote and Republican vote were almost identical in 1937 and 1941, the ALP line lost 47,000 votes (2.4%), almost entirely from Manhattan (−18,000) and Brooklyn (−26,000), as the vote on La Guardia's other lines (Fusion, Progressive and United City) dropped from 187,000 (8.3%) to 86,000 (3.7%). The Democratic Party gained about 160,000 votes lost by La Guardia (and about 7½% of the total). In both Queens and Richmond (Staten Island), the swing was even greater: La Guardia lost over 15% of the total vote (and the Democrats gained over 15%) from 1937, as his lead there flipped from roughly 56%–44% to 39%–60%.

Party		Manhattan	The Bronx	Brooklyn	Queens	Richmond [Staten Is.]	Total	%
change in La Guardia's margin of victory, 1937–1941		– 21,481	– 31,205	–116,061	–133,684	– 19,160	– 321,591	– 14.5%
La Guardia's margin over Jeremiah Mahoney (1937)		+ 91,989	+105,517	+207,869	+ 40,966	+ 7,533	+ 453,874	+ 20.3%
La Guardia's margin over O'Dwyer (1941)		+ 70,508	+ 74,312	+ 91,808	– 92,718	– 11,627	+ 132,283	+ 5.8%
Fiorello H. La Guardia	Republican	188,851	103,420	242,537	116,359	17,318	668,485	29.5%
Fiorello H. La Guardia	Republican	35.6%	22.9%	30.5%	27.1%	30.7%	668,485	29.5%
Fiorello H. La Guardia	American Labor Party	81,642	135,900	174,601	39,693	3,538	435,374	19.2%
Fiorello H. La Guardia	American Labor Party	15.4%	30.1%	21.9%	9.3%	6.3%	435,374	19.2%
Fiorello H. La Guardia	City Fusion	21,642	14,719	17,024	8,759	1,223	63,367	2.8%
Fiorello H. La Guardia	United City	6,090	5,568	5,694	1,770	170	19,292	0.9%
Fiorello H. La Guardia	Total	298,225	259,607	439,856	166,581	22,249	1,186,518	52.4%
Fiorello H. La Guardia	Total	56.2%	57.6%	55.2%	38.8%	39.4%	1,186,518	52.4%
William O'Dwyer	Democratic	227,717	185,295	348,048	259,299	33,876	1,054,235	46.6%
William O'Dwyer	Democratic	42.9%	41.1%	43.7%	60.5%	60.1%	1,054,235	46.6%
George W. Hartmann	Socialist	4,790	6,005	8,574	2,973	274	22,616	1.0%
Total		530,732	450,907	796,478	428,853	56,399	2,263,369	

=== 1937 ===
1937	Party	Manhattan	The Bronx	Brooklyn	Queens	Richmond [Staten Is.]	Total	%
La Guardia's margin over Mahoney		+ 91,989	+105,517	+ 207,869	+ 40,966	+ 7,533	+ 453,874	+ 20.3%
Fiorello H. La Guardia	Republican	181,518	96,468	228,313	144,433	23,879	674,611	30.2%
Fiorello H. La Guardia	Republican	32.1%	22.0%	29.2%	37.3%	38.4%	674,611	30.2%
Fiorello H. La Guardia	American Labor Party	99,735	138,756	200,783	40,153	3,363	482,790	21.6%
Fiorello H. La Guardia	American Labor Party	17.6%	31.6%	25.7%	10.4%	5.4%	482,790	21.6%
Fiorello H. La Guardia	Fusion	39,959	30,677	55,423	26,217	7,280	159,556	7.1%
Fiorello H. La Guardia	Fusion	7.1%	7.0%	7.1%	6.8%	11.7%	159,556	7.1%
Fiorello H. La Guardia	Progressive	7,783	6,421	9,997	3,136	336	27,673	1.2%
Fiorello H. La Guardia	Total	328,995	272,322	494,516	213,939	34,858	1,344,630	60.2%
Fiorello H. La Guardia	Total	58.1%	62.0%	63.3%	55.3%	56.1%	1,344,630	60.2%
Jeremiah T. Mahoney	Democratic	233,120	163,856	282,137	171,002	27,100	877,215	39.2%
Jeremiah T. Mahoney	Democratic	41.2%	37.3%	36.1%	44.2%	43.6%	877,215	39.2%
Jeremiah T. Mahoney	Trades Union	2,044	1,378	2,490	1,014	122	7,048	0.3%
Jeremiah T. Mahoney	Anti-Communist	1,842	1,571	2,020	957	103	6,493	0.3%
Jeremiah T. Mahoney	Total	237,006	166,805	286,647	172,973	27,325	890,756	39.8%
Jeremiah T. Mahoney	Total	41.9%	38.0%	36.7%	44.7%	43.9%	890,756	39.8%
Total		566,001	439,127	781,163	386,912	62,183	2,235,386	

Note that the leading line in every borough, and in the city as a whole, is the Democratic line for Judge Mahoney. Running on the Republican line alone (as he did when losing the election of 1929), Mayor La Guardia would have lost every borough, but he carried all five when the American Labor Party line was added. The ALP line did better than the Republican line in The Bronx, although worse than the Democratic one. There were also 2,307 votes for Emil Teichert on the Industrial Government line.

=== 1933 ===
1933	Party	Manhattan	The Bronx	Brooklyn	Queens	Richmond [Staten Is.]	Total	%
Fiorello H. La Guardia	Republican – Fusion	203,479	151,669	331,920	154,369	27,085	868,522	40.4%
Fiorello H. La Guardia	Republican – Fusion	38.4%	38.8%	44.4%	39.3%	43.7%	868,522	40.4%
Joseph V. McKee	Recovery	123,707	131,280	194,558	141,296	18,212	609,053	28.3%
Joseph V. McKee	Recovery	23.3%	33.6%	26.0%	36.0%	29.4%	609,053	28.3%
John P. O'Brien	Democratic	192,649	93,403	194,335	90,501	15,784	586,672	27.3%
John P. O'Brien	Democratic	36.3%	23.9%	26.0%	23.0%	25.4%	586,672	27.3%
Charles Solomon	Socialist	10,525	14,758	26,941	6,669	953	59,846	3.0%
Robert Minor	Communist	5,143	8,674	10,802	1,248	177	26,044	1.3%
Total		536,100	400,297	759,399	394,393	62,316	2,152,505	

While opposed by Tammany Hall, McKee enjoyed the support of Democratic President (and former Governor) Franklin D. Roosevelt, who declared neutrality when his ally Mayor La Guardia was running for reelection in § 1937. (See Ed Flynn's comments about FDR's 1936 contribution to starting the American Labor Party in the § References below.) According to Michael Tomasky, La Guardia, who had lost the § 1921 Republican Mayoral primary to Manhattan Borough President Henry Curran, did not enjoy the support of a united Republican Party when he won the party's nomination and lost the general election in § 1929, but was able to win over Republican organizational support in 1933. The 1933 LaGuardia vote was 446,833 Republican and 421,689 City Fusion. The O'Brien vote was 570,937 Democratic and 15,735 Jeffersonian. There were also 1,778 votes for Henry Klein-Five Cent Fare & Taxpayers; 472 for Aaron Orange – Socialist Labor; and 118 for Adolph Silver – Independent Union.

==== Collapse of the Socialist Party vote ====
In 1933, a year that might otherwise have favored the Socialist Party's chances, the New Deal began, Morris Hillquit died, Norman Thomas refused to run again for mayor, and the Socialist vote (previously as high as one-eighth to one-fifth of the total) collapsed irretrievably from a quarter of a million to sixty thousand (one-thirtieth of the total). Many supporters of Thomas's 1929 campaign defected (some, like Paul Blanshard, also leaving the Party) to support Fiorello La Guardia. By the time of the next mayoral election in 1937, which the Socialist Party decided by internal referendum not to contest, many reformers and trade-unionists who wanted to support major-party progressives like La Guardia (R-ALP-Fusion), Gov. Herbert Lehman (D-ALP) and Pres. Franklin D. Roosevelt (D-ALP) from outside the two-party structure backed the American Labor Party (ALP), the Social Democratic Federation and later the Liberal Party of New York. After a disastrous gubernatorial campaign in 1938 (where Thomas and George Hartmann won only 25,000 votes out of over 4.7 million), the Socialist Party lost its separate line on the New York ballot, allowed its members to join the ALP, and indeed encouraged them to do so. In 1939, the Socialist Harry W. Laidler, a co-founder of the Intercollegiate Socialist Society and League for Industrial Democracy, was elected (with the help of proportional representation) to the New York City Council on the ALP's ticket, but lost its renomination two years later because of rivalry with the Communists.

- [Although not apparent from the table below, the Communist Party's vote for other municipal offices, such as City Council and President of the Board of Aldermen, was increasing at the same time that the Socialist Party's was declining below the Communists'. But in 1936, when the foundation of the ALP coincided with world Communism's shift from independent action towards the Popular Front, New York City Communists redirected much of their own energy towards supporting the ALP.]

The rise and fall of the Socialist vote for mayor of the City of New York
year	Social-Democratic Party & Socialist Party of America	votes	%	Socialist Labor Party	votes	%	other left, labor & reform	votes	%
1897				Lucien Sanial †	14,467	2.8%	Henry George, Jefferson Dem.	21,693	4.1%
1901	Ben Hanford [SDP]	9,834	1.7%	Benjamin F. Keinard	6,213	1.1%			
1903	Charles Forman [SDP]	16,956	2.9%	James Hunter	5,205	0.9%			
1905	Algernon Lee	11,817	2.0%	John Kinneally	2,276	0.4%	W.R. Hearst, Muni. Own'ship	224,989	37.2%
1909	Joseph Cassidy	11,768	2.0%	James Hunter	1,256	0.2%	Wm R. Hearst, Civic Alliance	154,187	25.9%
1913	Charles Edward Russell	32,057	5.1%	William Walters	1,647	0.3%			
1917	Morris Hillquit	145,332	21.7%	Edmund Seidel	858	0.1%	George Wallace, Single Tax	258	0.04%
1921	Jacob Panken	82,607	7.1%	John P. Quinn	1,049	0.1%	Jerome De Hunt, Farmer-Lab.	1,008	0.1%
1925	Norman Thomas	39,574	3.5%	Joseph Brandon	1,643	0.1%	Warren Fisher, Progressive	1,498	0.1%
1929	Norman Thomas	175,697	12.0%	Olive M. Johnson	6,401	0.4%	Richard Enright, Square Deal	5,965	0.4%
1932	Morris Hillquit	251,656	12.6%	Olive M. Johnson	11,379	0.5%	Wm. Patterson, Communist	24,014	1.2%
1933	Charles Solomon	59,846	3.0%				Robert Minor, Communist	26,044	1.3%
1937	[no candidate]			Emil Teichert	2,367	0.1%	F. H. La Guardia, ALP line only	482,790	21.6%
1941	George W. Hartmann	22,616	1.0%				F. H. La Guardia, ALP line only	435,374	19.2%

[Click on the year for fuller details. ALP = American Labor Party (see commentary above). Socialist Labor Party candidates and votes not retrievable for every year from the sources used for this article. Readers are encouraged to supply any missing details.]

† In 1894 and in 1897, Lucien Sanial was the mayoral candidate of the Socialist Labor Party before both the SLP and the Social Democratic Party each split in two. In 1901, one faction of the SLP, led by Morris Hillquit, and one faction of the SDP, led by Eugene V. Debs, united to form the Socialist Party of America, which soon drew away many votes formerly cast for the SLP. For further details, see Hillquit's History of Socialism in the United States (1910) and Howard Quint's Forging of American Socialism (1964), both cited in the § References at the end of this article.

=== 1932 ===
Totals after a court-ordered recount:

Year	Candidate	Party	Total	percent
1932 (after recount)	John P. O'Brien	Democratic	1,054,324	(53.0%)
1932 (after recount)	Lewis H. Pounds	Republican	443,020	(22.3%)
1932 (after recount)	Morris Hillquit	Socialist	251,656	(12.6%)
1932 (after recount)	Joseph V. McKee	Independent/write-in	241,899	(12.2%)

Joseph V. McKee, as the (popularly elected) president of the Board of Aldermen, became acting mayor upon the resignation of elected Mayor Jimmy Walker on September 1, 1932. McKee's write-in total is the highest any New York City election would ever see. For the election after the next one, voting machines which would make write-in voting much more difficult were introduced. Machines of this basic design are still being used.

Lewis Humphrey Pounds was President of the Borough of Brooklyn from June 1913 to December 1917.

This was the last of many campaigns for different offices by Morris Hillquit, a co-founder of the Socialist Party of America, who died in 1933. Hillquit had won over 21% of the vote for mayor in 1917.

- Borough returns before the recount (which did not significantly affect the outcome):

1932 (before recount)	Party	Manhattan	The Bronx	Brooklyn	Queens	Richmond [Staten Is.]	Total	%
John P. O'Brien	Democratic	308,944	181,639	358,945	176,070	30,517	1,056,115	53.2%
John P. O'Brien	Democratic	60.0%	50.2%	50.1%	47.6%	54.1%	1,056,115	53.2%
Lewis H. Pounds	Republican	116,729	48,366	157,152	105,068	16,586	443,901	22.0%
Lewis H. Pounds	Republican	22.7%	13.4%	21.9%	28.4%	29.4%	443,901	22.0%
Morris Hillquit	Socialist	40,011	68,980	113,622	24,981	2,293	249,887	12.4%
Morris Hillquit	Socialist	7.8%	19.1%	15.8%	6.8%	4.1%	249,887	12.4%
Joseph V. McKee	Independent (write-in)	42,299	50,212	73,431	61,648	6,782	234,372	11.6%
Joseph V. McKee	Independent (write-in)	8.2%	13.9%	10.2%	16.7%	12.0%	234,372	11.6%
Total	514,661	361,612	716,963	370,018	56,414	2,019,668		

There were also 24,014 votes 1.2% for William Patterson – Communist and 11,379 0.5% for Olive Johnson – Socialist Labor

=== 1929 ===
1929	Party	Manhattan	The Bronx	Brooklyn	Queens	Richmond [Staten Is.]	Total	%
Jimmy Walker	Democratic	232,370	159,948	283,432	166,188	25,584	867,522	60.7%
Jimmy Walker	Democratic	63.8%	62.9%	57.7%	61.7%	60.7%	867,522	60.7%
Fiorello H. La Guardia	Republican	91,944	52,646	132,095	75,911	15,079	367,675	25.7%
Fiorello H. La Guardia	Republican	25.3%	20.7%	26.9%	28.2%	34.0%	367,675	25.7%
Norman Thomas	Socialist	37,316	39,181	71,145	24,897	3,248	175,697	12.3%
Norman Thomas	Socialist	10.3%	15.4%	14.5%	9.2%	7.3%	175,697	12.3%
Olive M. Johnson	Socialist Labor	1,238	1,577	2,585	906	95	6,401	0.4%
Richard Edward Enright	Square Deal	1,121	845	2,361	1,354	284	5,965	0.4%
subtotal		363,989	254,197	491,618	269,256	44,290	1,423,260	99.6%
others							6,125	0.4%
Total							1,429,385	

There were also 5,805 votes for William Weinstone – Communist and 320 votes for Lawrence Tracy – Commonwealth Land. The great stock market crash hit Wall Street on October 24–29, 1929, less than two weeks before Election Day. Richard Edward Enright was New York City Police Commissioner from 1918 to 1925.

== 1897 to 1925 ==
¶ Basic numbers for the elections of 1897 to 1925 come from The World Almanac and Book of Facts for 1929 and 1943. Percentages and borough totals calculated independently. (Because of some anomalies, not all columns and rows add precisely.) First names and informational links gathered from Wikipedia and several external sources, including the free public archive of The New York Times.

=== 1925 ===
Mayor Hylan, an ally of the newspaper publisher William Randolph Hearst, was unseated in a venomous Democratic primary by "Gentleman" Jimmy Walker, the Democratic party leader in the New York State Senate, who had been recruited to oppose Hylan by Hearst's inveterate enemy, Democratic Governor Al Smith. After the death of Tammany Hall leader Charles F. Murphy in 1924, the regular Democratic organizations also split their allegiances, with Hylan receiving support from John McCooey, the leader in Brooklyn, and Walker from Ed Flynn of the Bronx. (Hearst had run for mayor on third-party tickets in 1905 and 1909, while Al Smith had lost a bid for the Democratic nomination for mayor in 1917, instead winning the presidency of the New York City Council as Hylan's running mate.)

1925 general election	Party	Manhattan	The Bronx	Brooklyn	Queens	Richmond [Staten Is.]	Total	%
Jimmy Walker	Democratic	247,079	131,226	244,029	103,629	22,724	748,687	65.8%
Jimmy Walker	Democratic	69.4%	71.8%	60.9%	63.0%	67.3%	748,687	65.8%
Frank D. Waterman	Republican	98,617	39,615	139,060	58,478	10,794	346,564	30.5%
Frank D. Waterman	Republican	27.7%	21.7%	34.7%	35.6%	32.0%	346,564	30.5%
Norman Thomas	Socialist	9,482	11,133	16,809	1,943	207	39,574	3.5%
Joseph Brandon	Socialist Labor	388	488	591	155	21	1,643	0.1%
Warren Fisher	Progressive	387	262	528	284	37	1,498	0.1%
Total		355,953	182,724	401,017	164,489	33,783	1,137,966	

1925 Democratic primary	Manhattan	The Bronx	Brooklyn	Queens	Richmond [Staten Is.]	Total	%
Jimmy Walker	102,835	45,308	65,671	28,203	6,321	248,338	62%
Jimmy Walker	79%	68%	52%	47%	34%	248,338	62%
John Francis Hylan	27,802	21,228	60,814	32,163	12,197	154,204	38%
John Francis Hylan	21%	32%	48%	53%	66%	154,204	38%
subtotal (for Walker and Hylan only)	130,637	66,536	126,485	60,366	18,518	402,542	[100%]

=== 1921 ===
1921	Party	Manhattan	The Bronx	Brooklyn	Queens	Richmond [Staten Is.]	Total	%
John Francis Hylan	Democratic	261,452	118,235	260,143	87,676	22,741	750,247	64.2%
John Francis Hylan	Democratic	62.9%	67.6%	62.1%	69.0%	70.8%	750,247	64.2%
Henry H. Curran	Republican – Coalition	124,253	34,919	128,259	36,415	9,000	332,846	28.5%
Henry H. Curran	Republican – Coalition	29.9%	20.0%	30.6%	28.6%	28.0%	332,846	28.5%
Jacob Panken	Socialist	28,756	21,255	29,580	2,741	275	82,607	7.1%
Jacob Panken	Socialist	6.9%	12.2%	7.1%	2.2%	0.9%	82,607	7.1%
Jerome T. De Hunt	Farmer Labor	321	133	395	88	71	1,008	0.1%
John P. Quinn	Socialist Labor	316	244	346	123	20	1,049	0.1%
George K. Hinds	Prohibition	375	120	390	111	14	1,010	0.1%
Total		415,473	174,906	419,113	127,154	32,121	1,168,767	

Henry Curran was the borough president of Manhattan and heavily defeated Fiorello H. La Guardia, president of the board of aldermen, in the Republican primary election for mayor. There was also 454 votes for Joseph Miller on the Single Tax Line and 443 votes for Benjamin Gitlow on the Workers League Line

=== 1917 ===
1917	Party	Manhattan	The Bronx	Brooklyn	Queens	Richmond [Staten Is.]	Total	%
John Francis Hylan	Democratic	113,728	41,546	114,487	35,399	8,850	314,010	46.6%
John Francis Hylan	Democratic	46.4%	42.9%	46.5%	51.7%	58.2%	314,010	46.6%
John Purroy Mitchel	Fusion	66,748	19,247	52,921	13,641	2,940	155,497	23.1%
John Purroy Mitchel	Fusion	27.3%	19.9%	21.5%	19.9%	19.4%	155,497	23.1%
Morris Hillquit	Socialist	51,176	30,374	48,880	13,477	1,425	145,332	21.6%
Morris Hillquit	Socialist	20.9%	31.4%	19.9%	19.7%	9.4%	145,332	21.6%
William M. Bennett	Republican	13,230	5,576	29,748	5,916	1,968	56,438	8.4%
William M. Bennett	Republican	5.4%	5.8%	12.1%	8.6%	13.0%	56,438	8.4%
Subtotal		244,882	96,743	246,036	68,433	15,183	671,277	99.7%
David Leigh Colvin	Prohibition						897	0.1%
Edmund Seidel	Socialist Labor						858	0.1%
George Wallace	Single Tax						268	0.04%
Total							673,300	100.0%

Notes: The Single Tax on land values was the proposal and platform of Henry George, who ran for mayor in 1897 and 1886. D. Leigh Colvin later contested the U.S. presidential election of 1936 for the Prohibition Party.

The fall 1917 election would have been exciting even had it occurred in peacetime. In September, the city held its first-ever primary elections for mayor. The sitting independent mayor, John P. Mitchel, who had enjoyed Republican support under Fusion in 1913, narrowly lost the Republican primary to William Bennett, after mistakes and frauds led to a series of recounts. When negotiations between the parties failed, Mitchel ran alone as a Fusion candidate against Bennett, the Socialist Morris Hillquit and John F. Hylan, the regular Democrat supported by Tammany Hall and William Randolph Hearst.

However, the elections happened after the United States had declared war on April 6. Hillquit and the Socialist Party quickly and vigorously opposed the war, which Mitchel vigorously supported. Hillquit's anti-war position helped the Socialists win their highest-ever vote for mayor, but also led to vitriolic denunciations by many, including The New York Times and former President Theodore Roosevelt. Mitchel and Hillquit each won less than quarter of the vote, while Hylan, who had been non-committal about the war, won the election with less than half the vote. However, as in 1897, the numbers suggest that Tammany Hall might have won even against a unified opposition.

=== 1897 to 1913 ===
The Bronx and Manhattan, although separate Boroughs since 1898, shared New York County and reported their votes together until Bronx County was formed in April 1912 and came into its separate existence on January 1, 1914.

[ The World Almanac does not list separate returns for the two boroughs until 1917, but The Encyclopedia of New York City (see Sources) gives these major candidates' results for 1913:

- Manhattan: McCall 103,429 – Mitchel 131,280, and The Bronx: McCall 25,684 – Mitchel 46,944. ]

1913	Party	The Bronx and Manhattan	Brooklyn	Queens	Richmond [Staten Is.]	Total	%
John Purroy Mitchel	Fusion	178,224	137,074	34,279	8,604	358,181	57.1%
John Purroy Mitchel	Fusion	54.7%	60.2%	59.6%	54.4%	358,181	57.1%
Edward E. McCall	Democratic	129,113	77,826	20,097	6,883	233,919	37.3%
Edward E. McCall	Democratic	39.6%	34.2%	35.0%	43.3%	233,919	37.3%
Charles Edward Russell	Socialist	17,383	11,560	2,865	249	32,057	5.1%
William Walters	Socialist Labor	952	538	129	28	1,647	0.3%
Norman Raymond	Prohibition	412	587	118	96	1,213	0.2%
Total		326,084	227,585	57,488	15,860	627,017	

Mayor William Jay Gaynor, who had survived being shot in the throat by a disappointed office-seeker in 1910, died at sea from the indirect effects of his injury on September 10, 1913. He was succeeded for the rest of 1913 by Ardolph Loges Kline, the acting president of the board of aldermen.

1909	Party	The Bronx and Manhattan	Brooklyn	Queens	Richmond [Staten Is.]	Total	%
William Jay Gaynor	Democratic	134,075	91,666	17,570	7,067	250,378	42.1%
William Jay Gaynor	Democratic	42.5%	41.9%	38.4%	47.1%	250,378	42.1%
William Randolph Hearst	Civic Alliance	87,155	49,040	15,186	2,806	154,187	25.9%
William Randolph Hearst	Civic Alliance	27.6%	22.4%	33.2%	18.7%	154,187	25.9%
Otto T. Bannard	Republican – Fusion	86,497	73,860	11,907	5,049	177,313	29.8%
Otto T. Bannard	Republican – Fusion	27.4%	33.8%	26.0%	33.6%	177,313	29.8%
Joseph Cassidy	Socialist	6,811	3,874	1,004	79	11,768	2.0%
James T. Hunter	Socialist Labor	813	369	56	18	1,256	0.2%
Total		315,351	218,809	45,723	15,019	594,902	
1905	Party	The Bronx and Manhattan	Brooklyn	Queens	Richmond [Staten Is.]	Total	%
George B. McClellan Jr.	Democratic	140,264	68,788	13,228	6,127	228,407	37.8%
George B. McClellan Jr.	Democratic	41.6%	31.4%	37.6%	44.1%	228,407	37.8%
William Randolph Hearst	Municipal Ownership League	123,292	84,835	13,766	3,096	224,989	37.2%
William Randolph Hearst	Municipal Ownership League	36.6%	38.8%	39.2%	22.3%	224,989	37.2%
William Mills Ivins Sr.	Republican	64,280	61,192	7,213	4,499	137,184	22.7%
William Mills Ivins Sr.	Republican	19.1%	28.0%	20.5%	32.4%	137,184	22.7%
Algernon Lee	Socialist	7,466	3,387	847	117	11,817	2.0%
John Kinneally	Socialist Labor	1,485	657	95	39	2,276	0.4%
Total		336,787	218,859	35,149	13,878	604,673	
1903	Party	The Bronx and Manhattan	Brooklyn	Queens	Richmond [Staten Is.]	Total	%
George B. McClellan Jr.	Democratic	188,681	102,569	17,074	6,458	314,782	53.4%
George B. McClellan Jr.	Democratic	56.1%	48.8%	56.5%	48.1%	314,782	53.4%
Seth Low	Fusion	132,178	101,251	11,960	6,697	252,086	42.7%
Seth Low	Fusion	39.3%	48.2%	39.6%	49.9%	252,086	42.7%
Charles Forman	Social Democratic	11,318	4,529	976	133	16,956	2.9%
James T. Hunter	Socialist Labor	3,540	1,411	178	76	5,205	0.9%
John McKee	Prohibition	376	396	47	50	869	0.1%
Total		336,093	210,156	30,235	13,414	589,898	
1901	Party	The Bronx and Manhattan	Brooklyn	Queens	Richmond [Staten Is.]	Total	%
Edward M. Shepard	Democratic	156,631	88,858	13,679	6,009	265,177	45.8%
Edward M. Shepard	Democratic	47.4%	42.7%	49.4%	46.1%	265,177	45.8%
Seth Low	Fusion	162,298	114,625	13,118	6,772	296,813	51.2%
Seth Low	Fusion	49.1%	55.0%	47.4%	51.9%	296,813	51.2%
Benjamin Hanford	Social Democratic	6,409	2,692	613	120	9,834	1.7%
Benjamin F. Keinard	Socialist Labor	4,323	1,638	181	71	6,213	1.1%
Alfred L. Manierre	Prohibition	617	501	74	72	1,264	0.2%
Total		330,278	208,314	27,665	13,044	579,301	
1897	Party	The Bronx and Manhattan	Brooklyn	Queens	Richmond [Staten Is.]	Total	%
Robert A. Van Wyck	Democratic	143,666	76,185	9,275	4,871	233,997	44.7%
Robert A. Van Wyck	Democratic	48.0%	40.1%	40.7%	43.5%	233,997	44.7%
Seth Low	Citizens' Union	77,210	65,656	5,876	2,798	151,540	28.9%
Seth Low	Citizens' Union	25.8%	34.6%	25.8%	25.0%	151,540	28.9%
Benjamin F. Tracy	Republican	55,834	37,611	5,639	2,779	101,863	19.5%
Benjamin F. Tracy	Republican	18.6%	19.8%	24.7%	24.8%	101,863	19.5%
† Henry George	Jefferson Democracy	13,076	6,938	1,096	583	21,693	4.1%
Lucien Sanial	Socialist Labor	9,796	3,593	921	157	14,467	2.8%
Total		299,582	189,983	22,807	11,188	523,560	

The election of 1897 was held just before the Five Boroughs formally consolidated into Greater New York in 1898, so it was the present city's first mayoral election. For preliminary results for all the municipal offices, broken down into smaller districts, see "Democrats Take All – The Tammany Ticket Makes Almost a Clean Sweep of the Greater City – Only Two Republicans in the Council..." in The New York Times, November 4, 1897 (seen April 11, 2008).

† Henry George, author of Progress and Poverty and proponent of the Single Tax on land, died (probably from the strain of campaign speeches) on October 29, four days before Election Day; his son was nominated to take his place representing "The Democracy of Thomas Jefferson". [In 1886, George had been the United Labor Party's candidate for Mayor of the smaller City of New York, now the Borough of Manhattan, winning 68,110 votes to 90,552 for the Democrat Abram Hewitt and 60,435 for the Republican Theodore Roosevelt, although George's supporters maintained that he had lost the election through fraud.]

For Lucien Sanial, see the table notes under § Collapse of the Socialist Party vote above (1933) and ALL THEY NEED IS VOTES; THREE CANDIDATES FOR MAYOR WHO WOULD MAKE A STIR. in The New York Times for Wednesday, November 4, 1894, page 19.

It appears from the percentages to be an open question whether the Republican Party's decision in 1897 not to support Seth Low's Fusion campaign caused his defeat by splitting the vote against Tammany Hall. Republicans withdrew in Low's favor in 1901 (when he won) and in 1903 (when he lost).

== See also ==
- Mayor of New York City
- List of mayors of New York City
- History of New York City
- Government of New York City
- Politics of New York (state)
- Elections in New York (state)
- Tammany Hall
- American Labor Party
- Liberal Party of New York
- Conservative Party of New York State
- Independence Party of New York
- Working Families Party
- Green Party of New York
- Libertarian Party of New York
- New York City: the 51st State (a municipal political slate in 1969)
- 1886 New York City mayoral election

== Sources ==
Many sources have been consulted and compared, but the most important ones are these:

- [2001–2009] The Board of Elections in the City of New York – http://www.vote.nyc.ny.us/results.html;
- [1997] Jackson, Kenneth T., ed. (2010). The Encyclopedia of New York City (2nd ed.). New Haven: Yale University Press. ISBN 978-0-300-11465-2., pages 815–816;
  Cable News Network (CNN), 1997: http://www.cnn.com/ALLPOLITICS/1997/gen/resources/election97/results.html
- [1834–1993] The Encyclopedia of New York City (1st edition), edited by Kenneth T. Jackson (Yale University Press and The New York Historical Society, New Haven, Connecticut, 1995, ISBN 0-300-05536-6 ), especially the article "Mayoralty" by Charles W. Brecher with tables compiled by James Bradley
- [1929–1973] The New York Chronology by James Trager (HarperCollins, 2003, ISBN 0-06-074062-0 ) More details and preview available at https://books.google.com/books?id=xvGhQoNT27IC
- [1950–1953] The World Almanac and Book of Facts, 1957, page 299
- [1909–1941] The World Almanac and Book of Facts, 1943, page 412
- [1897–1925] The World Almanac and Book of Facts, 1929 (1971 reprint by American Heritage and Workman Publishing, ISBN 0-07-071881-4), page 893
- [1867–1923 and later] The New York Times archives
