= William Ivins =

William Ivins may refer to:

- William Mills Ivins Sr., reformer, mayoral candidate
- William Ivins Jr. (William Mills Ivins Jr.), curator of prints department at the Metropolitan Museum of Art, New York
