= Albert S. Bard =

Lawyer and civic activist

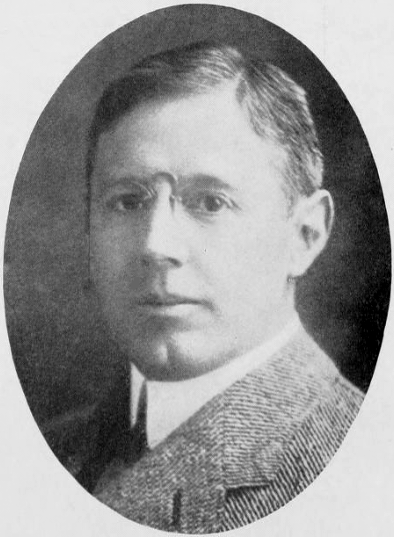
- Born: Albert Sprague Bard; December 19, 1866; Norwich, Connecticut, US
- Died: March 25, 1963 (aged 96); East Orange, New Jersey, US
- Education: Amherst College; Harvard Law School
- Occupations: Lawyer, civic activist

Albert Sprague Bard (December 19, 1866 – March 25, 1963) was an American lawyer and civic activist in New York City. A graduate of Amherst College and Harvard Law School, he engaged in the practice of corporation and general law until a few years before his death.

Never married, Bard was an energetic participant in civic and urban affairs. Bard exercised his influence through his work on committees of the Bar Association of New York City, the Citizens Union, and the City Club of New York. Other organizations of which he was a board member or officer included the Honest Ballot Association, Proportional Representation Committee, The National Roadside Council, Fine Arts Federation of New York, and the Municipal Art Society. Bard was known and dreaded for his progressive Republican and anti-Tammany stance. He was a founding member of the New York Young Republican Club.

== Early life ==
Albert S. Bard was born in Norwich, Connecticut on December 19, 1866.

== Preservationist ==
Bard had a particular interest in the protection of city streets and rural landscapes from the broadening of advertisements and billboards. From 1912 to 1914, Bard served as secretary and legal counsel to the Mayor's Billboard Advertising Commission and was the author of its final report. On a national scale, Bard took on corporations such as Standard Oil and lobbies including the Outdoor Advertising Association of America as legal counsel to the National Roadside Council from 1924 to 1955. The Council lobbied for the regulation of outdoor advertising, and, in the absence of legislation, putting consumer pressure on corporations to reduce offensive advertising.

== Bard Act ==
Bard is most noted for the passage of the Bard Act, the piece of legislation that enabled the creation of the New York City Landmarks Law in 1965.

As a preservationist, he opposed many of Robert Moses' plans for the development of New York City. He successfully organized opposition to the Brooklyn-Battery Bridge project and was instrumental in the preservation of Castle Clinton. In 1954, Bard drafted an act which was designed to enable cities in New York State to pass laws to protect their landmarks. The Bard Act was the piece of the legislative puzzle that was missing in order for New York City to pass landmark protection legislation. On April 2, 1956, the Bard Act was passed into a law.

== Election reformer ==
Working for the Honest Ballot Association, the Citizens' Union and the City Club, he was engaged in improving the election law and fighting the widespread election fraud in New York City and in the United States. Together with other reformers like William Mills Ivins, Sr. Bard sued several state and city officers and brought to court many citizens because of violating the "purity of the polls".

He died in East Orange, New Jersey on March 25, 1963.

== Albert S. Bard Awards and Honors ==
The Albert S. Bard Award, created in 1962 and administered by the City Club of New York, honored those who emulated Bard by contributing to enriching the intellectual and cultural life of the community through architecture and urban design. The City Club presented the Albert S. Bard Award for about 30 years before discontinuing it in the early 1990s.

Since 2003, the New York Preservation Archive Project has also awarded its annual Preservation Award at an event dubbed the "Bard Birthday Breakfast Benefit" in commemoration of the namesake's life, legacy, and impact on New York City's Landmarks Law.
