= Municipal Ownership League =

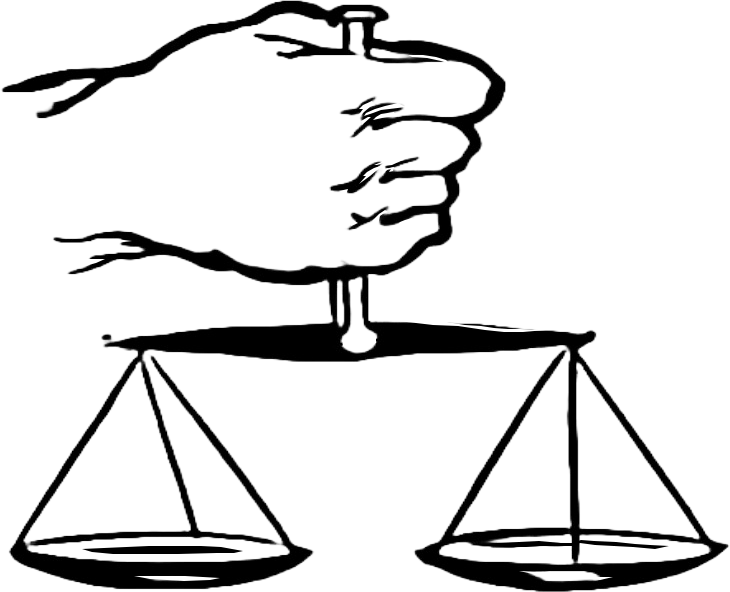
- Chairman: William Randolph Hearst
- Founded: 1904; 122 years ago
- Dissolved: 1906; 120 years ago
- Succeeded by: Independence Party
- Headquarters: New York City, NY
- Newspaper: New York Journal-American
- Ideology: Reformism; Progressivism; Labor rights
- Political position: Left-wing
- Colors: Bronze (party's medal color)

The Municipal Ownership League was an American third party formed in 1904 by controversial newspaper magnate and Congressman William Randolph Hearst for the purpose of contesting elections in New York City.

== Reason for formation ==
Hearst, a lifelong Democrat, formed the party chiefly as a means of toppling the Tammany Hall political machine, a faction of the Democratic Party which then dominated city politics, and specifically to defeat Tammany crony George B. McClellan, Jr., who was then running for a second term as Mayor of New York City.

== Anti-trust ideology ==
In addition to its anti-Tammany stance, the League was chiefly concerned with municipal ownership of public utilities, which were then in the hands of massive business combines called "trusts."

== Hearst's candidacy for mayor ==
Although Hearst had no wish to run on the League's ticket himself, feeling that a resounding loss would cripple his ambition to one day be elected President of the United States, he announced his candidacy for mayor after failing to recruit attorney Charles Evans Hughes or Judge Samuel Seabury for the job. His running mates were former State Senator John Ford for New York City Comptroller, and James Graham Phelps Stokes for President of the Board of Aldermen, who was a millionaire socialist writer, political activist, and philanthropist.

During the course of the election, Hearst, despite the opposition of Tammany, both major parties, the local Socialists, and every major newspaper other than his own, managed to create a coalition of trade unionists, immigrants, Progressive reformers, and disaffected Democrats and Republicans. On Election Day, November 7, 1905, Hearst polled 224,929 votes, or 37.16%. However, Mayor McClellan polled 228,397 votes (37.74%), and was thus narrowly re-elected. After the election, well-substantiated accusations of electoral fraud surfaced against McClellan and Tammany, but the results were not overturned.

== Other candidates of the party ==
In addition to Hearst, Ford and Stokes, the League fielded candidates for Borough Presidents, Districts Attorney, the Board of Aldermen, the New York Legislature, and several other local offices. Although most of the candidates lost their races (some by very narrow margins, almost certainly influenced by electoral fraud), the League did elect five state assemblymen, several aldermen, a borough president in Brooklyn and a district attorney in Queens.

== Replacement with another party ==
Hearst subsequently launched a new political party, the Independence League, with that organization politically fusing with the Democrats behind a joint slate in 1906, with Hearst heading the ticket as candidate for Governor of New York. This local organization was expanded from New York to Massachusetts and California in 1907 and to national status as the Independence Party, holding a convention and nominating a ticket for President and Vice-President of the United States in 1908.

== See also ==
- Independence Party (United States)
