= Vito P. Battista =

American politician (1908–1990)

Member of the New York State Assembly from the 38th district
- In office January 1, 1969 – December 31, 1974
- Preceded by: Anthony J. Travia
- Succeeded by: Frederick D. Schmidt

Personal details
- Born: September 7, 1908 Bari, Italy
- Died: May 24, 1990 (aged 81) Brooklyn, New York, U.S.
- Party: Republican

Vito P. Battista (September 7, 1908 – May 24, 1990) was an Italian-born American politician who served in the New York State Assembly from the 38th district from 1969 to 1974. He ran for New York's 9th congressional district in the 1980 election. He lost to incumbent, Geraldine Ferraro. He served on the Architectural and Transportation Barriers Compliance Board under president Ronald Reagan from 1984 until 1987. He died on May 24, 1990, in Brooklyn, New York City, New York at age 81.

== Political career ==
Beginning with the 1957 New York City mayoral race, Battista embarked on the first of what would be over 20 runs for office. He became such a fixture in New York politics, that The New York Times referred to him as “the perennial Battista.” Battista was known for campaign tactics that attracted media attention, including, at various points parading a camel, an elephant and a monkey through the streets of New York.

He won his first election, to the New York State Assembly, representing District 38, which covered Brooklyn and Queens, in 1969.

A main focus of Battista and his United Taxpayers Party was a lifelong opposition to rent control and public housing, and opposition to busing of children as an attempt to achieve school integration.
