= 1905 New York City mayoral election =

- November 7, 1905
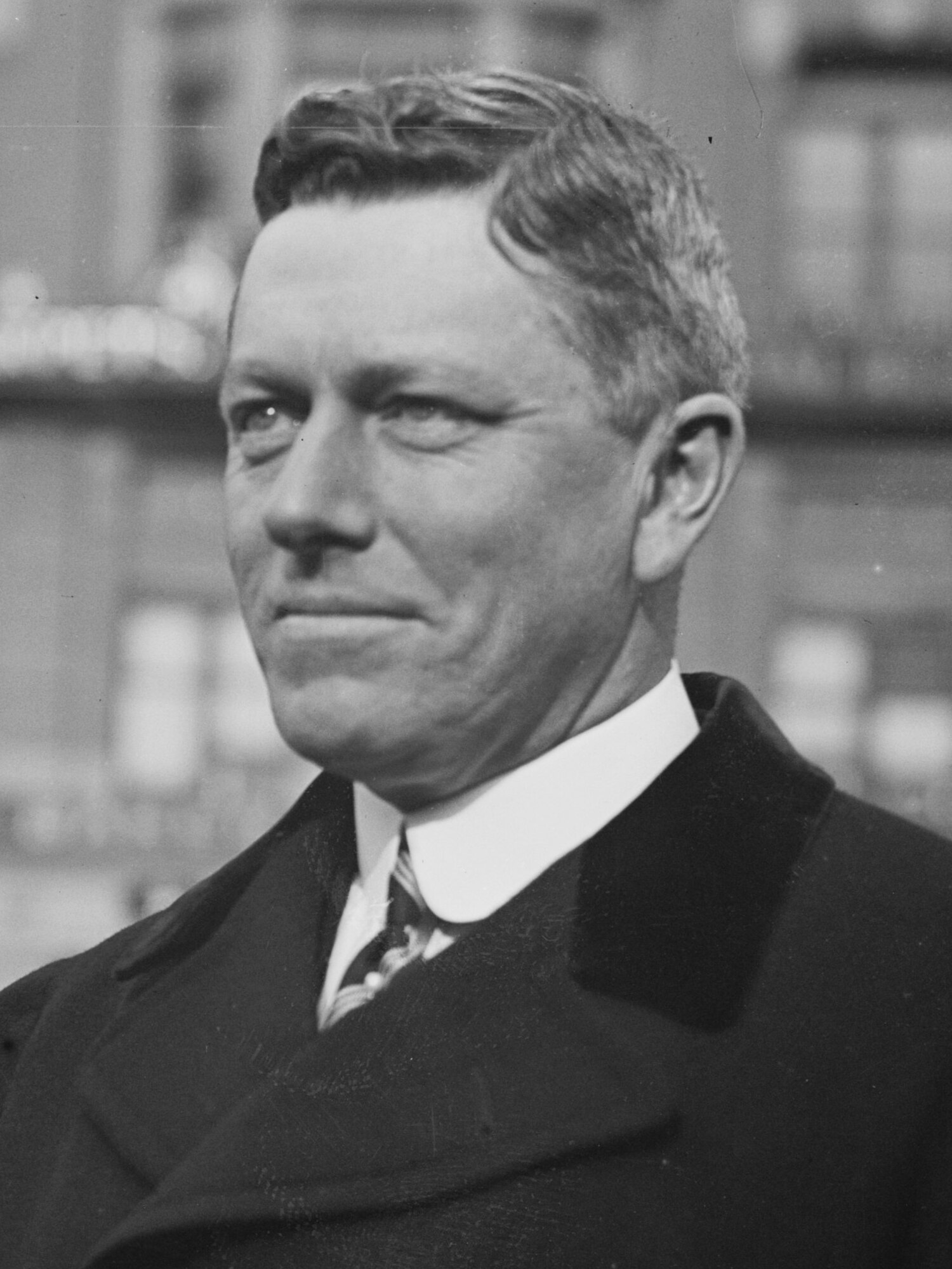

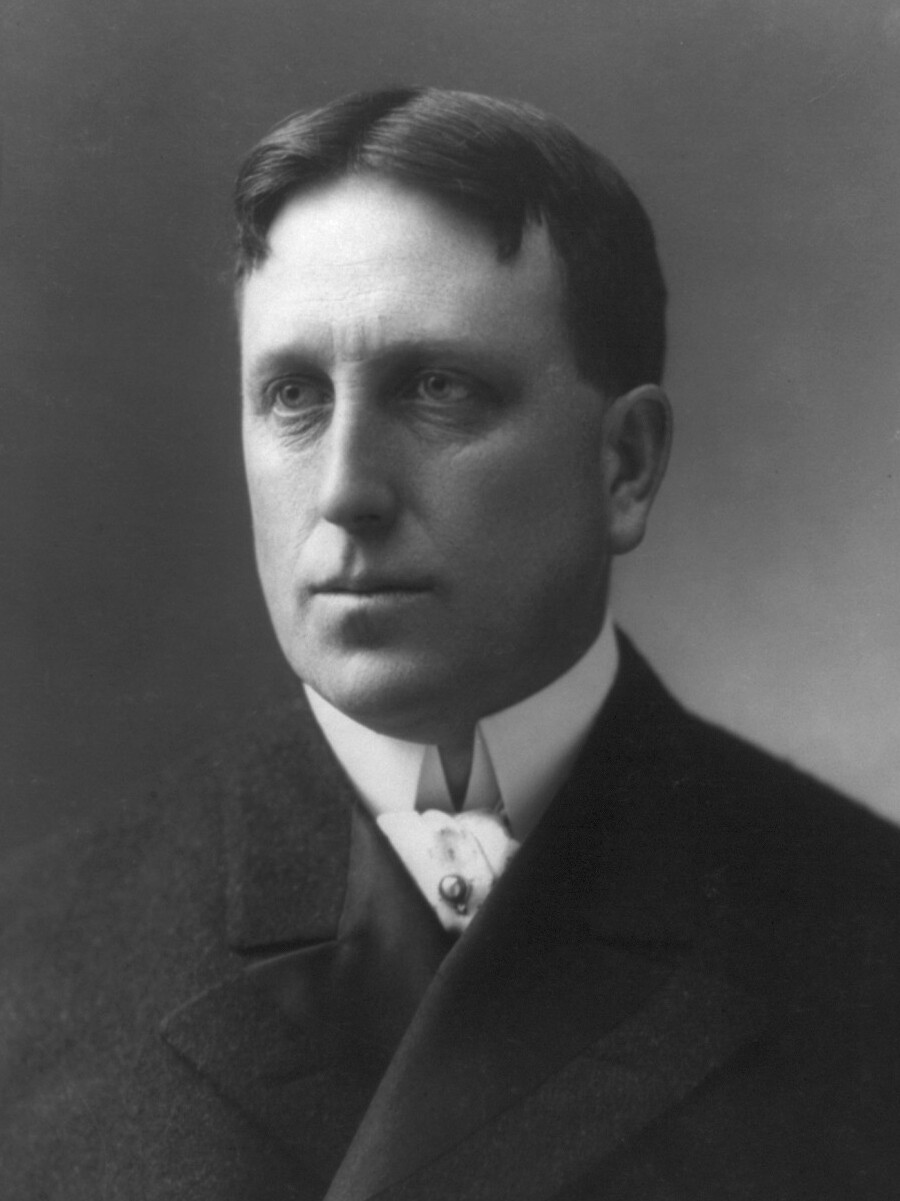

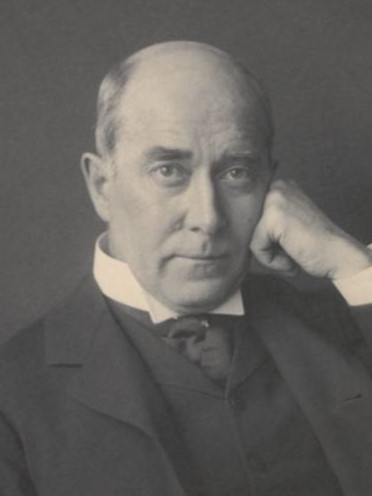
Nominee	George B. McClellan Jr.	William Randolph Hearst	William Mills Ivins Sr.
Party	Democratic	Municipal Ownership League	Republican
Popular vote	228,407	224,989	137,184
Percentage	37.8%	37.2%	22.7%
- Borough results McClellan: 40–50% Hearst: 30–40%
Mayor before election
George B. McClellan Jr.
Democratic
Elected mayor
George B. McClellan Jr.
Democratic

An election for Mayor of New York City was held on November 7, 1905.

Candidates included incumbent mayor George B. McClellan Jr., newspaper publisher, two-term U.S. Representative William Randolph Hearst, and reform advocate William Mills Ivins Sr.

McClellan was reelected with 37% of the vote.

There was evidence of electoral fraud against Hearst linked to the Tammany Hall machine, as well as violence and intimidation against Hearst poll watchers.

== Background ==
Entering the 1905 election, newspaper publisher William Randolph Hearst had developed a political reputation as a one-term United States representative and a progressive candidate for the presidency in 1904.

== General election ==
=== Candidates ===
- William Randolph Hearst, publisher of the New York Tribune and former U.S. Representative (Municipal Ownership)
- William Mills Ivins Sr., attorney and reform advocate (Republican)
- John Kinneally (Socialist Labor)
- Algernon Lee, editor of The Worker (Socialist)
- George B. McClellan Jr., incumbent mayor since 1904 and former U.S. Representative (Democratic)

=== Campaign ===
Hearst launched his campaign on October 13 with a failed campaign stop in Williamsburg, where he became lost and had to ask a policeman for directions. Future campaign events, however, were widely attended. His speeches emphasized his core platform plank of municipal ownership of services and utilities including water, transportation, ice, gas and electricity. In doing so, he simultaneously struck at the business trusts which ran the utilities and Tammany Hall, which had long relied on the utilities contracts as a source of political graft. Hearst made no effort in the campaign to mask his immense wealth and instead pointed to it as an argument for his trustworthiness, stating, "I am not in this election because I have any itch for office or because I want the salary, but because I want to accomplish something for your benefit and win your approval."

As the campaign entered November, Tammany Hall intensified their attacks against Hearst. One cartoon in the Tammany-run Daily News implicated Hearst for the 1901 assassination of President William McKinley; Tammany operatives attempted to circulate 300,000 copies to voters via the mail, but the poster was barred as "scurrilous matter." In a large November rally at Union Square, Tammany orator Bourke Cockran denounced Hearst as "an apostle of riot, an advocate of disorder, a promoter of socialism." Cockran continued, "[His election] would be such a pronouncement of anarchy and riot that the very foundations of society would be shattered and the whole fabric of social order reduced to ruin."

Hearst's popularity with common people was unchanged by the sustained attacks, however, and in early November newspapers predicted that regardless of the outcome, Hearst would wrest control of Tammany and the Manhattan Democratic Party from boss Charles Francis Murphy and McClellan. Entering the final week of the campaign, the New York Herald declared that the race was impossible to predict, given Hearst's strength in Democratic wards and the lack of clear party divisions. Hearst concluded his campaign with a free concert by the Metropolitan Opera orchestra at Madison Square Garden, which 50,000 attended. A nearby rally by Tammany at the Hippodrome also drew overflow crowds, and police intervened to prevent bloodshed when a thousand Hearst supporters marched north to confront the Tammany rally.

=== Results ===
On election day, there were widespread reports of voter fraud, poll watchers being chased from polling stations, delays in reporting returns, and unopened and uncounted ballots disappearing or being misplaced, including in the East River. The Independent described it as "the most extraordinary election ever witnessed in New York City."

The New York Times reported that Hearst poll watchers in at least three Tammany strongholds returned to campaign headquarters on election night with bandaged heads and arms in slings, and election returns from the same districts were being withheld. One Hearst worker, an R. Little, had "had a finger chewed off and his face cut."

New York City mayoral election, 1905
Party	Candidate	Votes	%
Democratic	George B. McClellan Jr.	228,407	37.8
Municipal Ownership League	William Randolph Hearst	224,989	37.2
Republican	William Mills Ivins Sr.	137,184	22.7
Socialist	Algernon Lee	11,817	2.0
Socialist Labor	John Kinneally	2,276	0.4
Total votes		604,673	100.00
Democratic hold			

=== Aftermath ===
After the election results were announced, Hearst launched a bipartisan campaign for a recount, holding demonstrations throughout the city and attacking Tammany more furiously than he had during the campaign. Though politicians and reformers including Republican candidate William Ivins and popular opinion agreed that the results had been fraudulent, few Tammany critics actually wished to see Hearst as mayor. In the same issue in which it reported on instances of election fraud, the Times congratulated the voters on rejecting Hearst, "Their votes have spared the city the humiliation, the trials and the dangers of a four years' management of its affairs by a peculiarly reckless, unschooled, and unsteady group of experimenters and adventurers . . . It is certain that the election of Mr. Hearst to be Mayor of New York would have sent a shiver of apprehension over the entire Union."

Hearst initially expected the results would be thrown out either via an immediate recount or through court action, but no recount was ever held. McClellan was declared elected on December 27; though Hearst continued to contest the election, neither courts nor the state legislature were willing to overturn the result and install Hearst as mayor.
