= William Ivins Jr. =

American art historian (1881–1961)

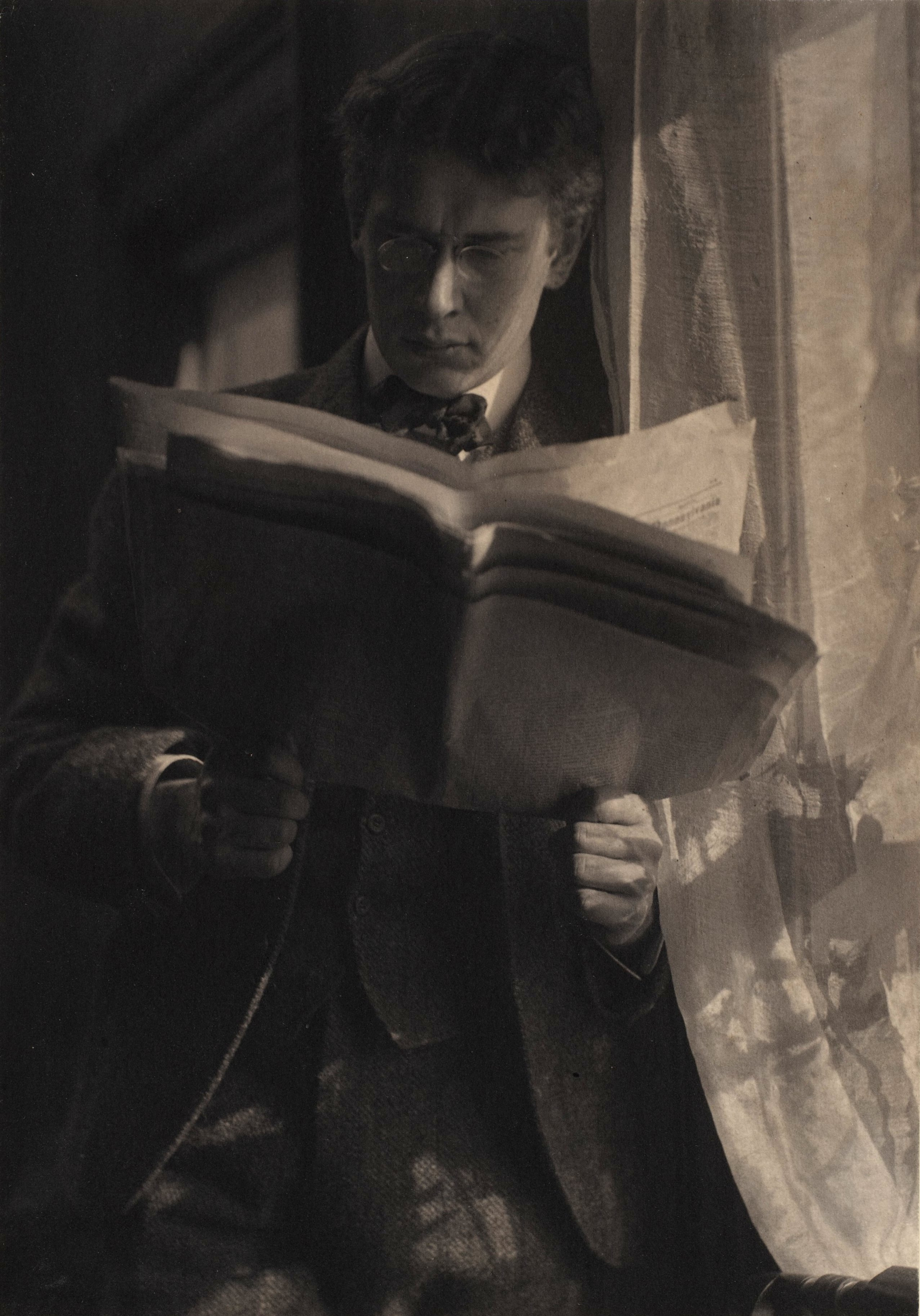
- Ivins circa 1910
- Born: William Mills Ivins Jr. 1881
- Died: 1961 (aged 79–80)
- Education: Harvard College; Ludwig-Maximilians-Universität München; Columbia University
- Occupations: Curator of Prints, Metropolitan Museum of Art
- Years active: 1916–1946
- Employer: Metropolitan Museum of Art
- Known for: Prints and Visual Communication
- Parent: William Mills Ivins Sr.

William Mills Ivins Jr. (1881–1961) was curator of the department of prints at the Metropolitan Museum of Art, New York, from its founding in 1916 until 1946, when he was succeeded by A. Hyatt Mayor.

The son of William Mills Ivins Sr. (1851–1915), a public utility lawyer who had been the 1905 Republican candidate for Mayor of New York City, Ivins studied at Harvard College and the Ludwig-Maximilians-Universität München before graduating in law from Columbia University in 1907.

After nine years' legal practice, he was asked to take on the conservation and interpretation of the Met's print collection. He built up the remarkable collections that can be seen there today, and he wrote many prefaces to exhibition catalogues, as well as other, occasional pieces which were later collected and published. His best-known book is Prints and Visual Communication (MIT Press, 1969, ISBN 0-262-59002-6 (first published 1953 by Harvard University Press)), and his How Prints Look (1943, revised edition 1987) remains in print.

He was influential on Philip Hofer, curator of the Department of Printing and Graphic Arts, Houghton Library at Harvard University.

In 2016, the Metropolitan Museum of Art celebrated the centenary of the founding of its Department of Prints with The Power of Prints: The Legacy of William M. Ivins and A. Hyatt Mayor. The exhibit explored the breath and depth of the collection created by Ivins and Mayor. The exhibit was accompanied by a catalog of the same name by Freyda Spira and Peter Parshall. ISBN 978-1-588-39585-6

== See also ==
- Visual communication
