= George B. McClellan Jr. =

American politician (1865–1940)

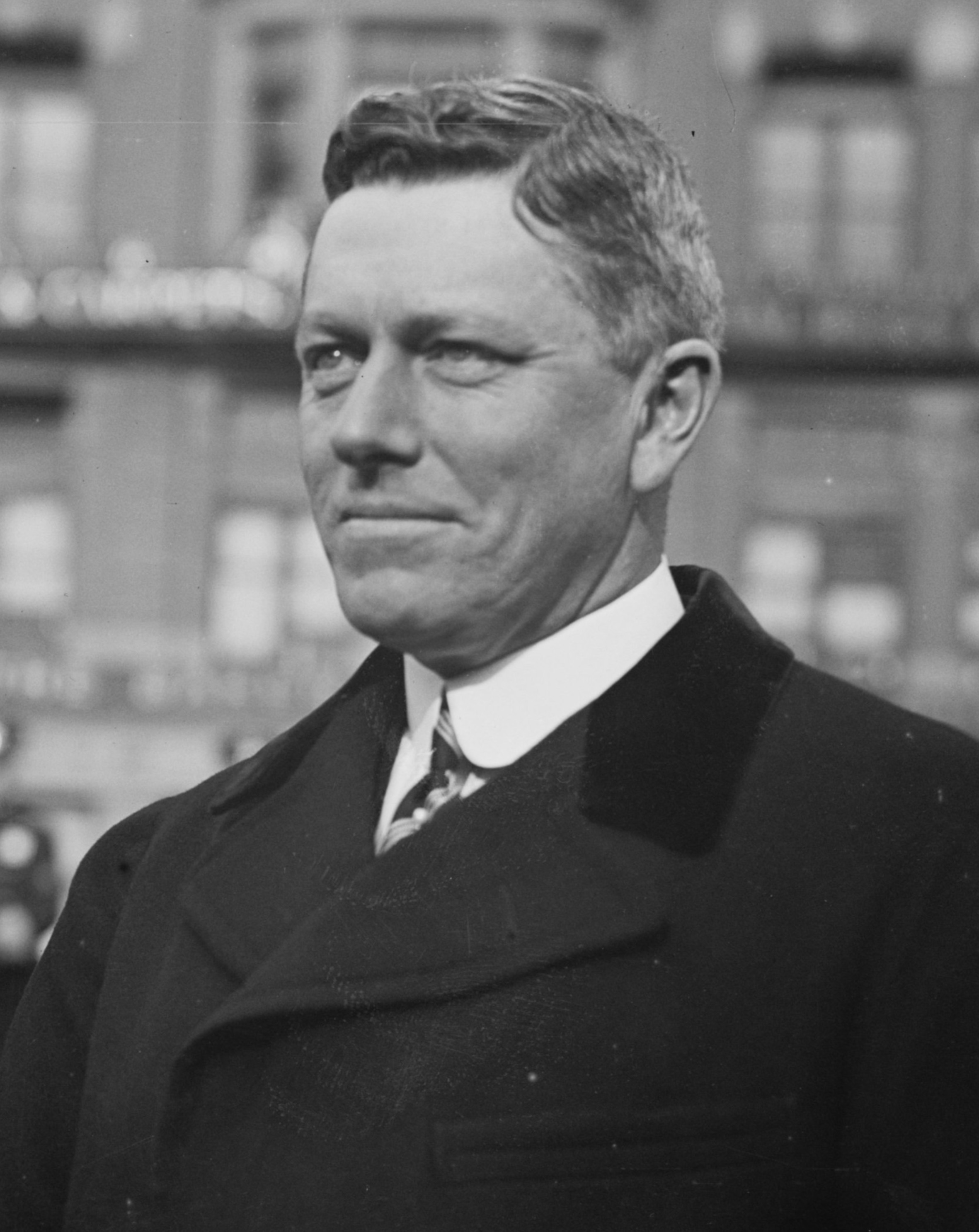
- McClellan c. 1909

94th Mayor of New York City
- In office January 1, 1904 – December 31, 1909
- Preceded by: Seth Low
- Succeeded by: William Jay Gaynor

Member of the U.S. House of Representatives from New York's 12th district
- In office March 4, 1895 – December 21, 1903
- Preceded by: William Bourke Cockran
- Succeeded by: William Bourke Cockran

Personal details
- Born: George Brinton McClellan Jr. November 23, 1865 Dresden, Kingdom of Saxony
- Died: November 30, 1940 (aged 75) Washington, D.C., U.S.
- Party: Democratic
- Spouse: Georgiana Louise Heckscher (m. 1889)
- Parents: George B. McClellan; Nelly McClellan
- Education: Princeton University (BA, MA); New York Law School (LLB)

Military service
- Allegiance: United States
- Branch/service: New York Army National Guard; United States Army
- Years of service: 1885–1888; 1917–1919
- Rank: Lieutenant colonel
- Unit: United States Army Ordnance Department
- Battles/wars: World War I; Meuse–Argonne offensive

George Brinton McClellan Jr. (November 23, 1865 – November 30, 1940), was an American politician and historian. He was the son of Civil War general George B. McClellan, who was the 1864 Democratic presidential nominee, and later Governor of New Jersey. A member of the Democratic Party, he was a member of the U.S. House of Representatives from 1895 to 1903, before serving as the 94th Mayor of New York City, from 1904 to 1909.

== Early life and education ==
McClellan was born on November 23, 1865, in Dresden, where his parents were visiting.

He went to school in Trenton in New Jersey, where his father was Governor, and later Saint John's School in Ossining, New York. From 1885 to 1888 he served in the New York Army National Guard. He received his Bachelor of Arts degree at Princeton in 1886 and his Master of Arts in 1889. Princeton, Fordham University, and Union College later each gave him the honorary degree of Doctor of Laws.

== Career ==
After graduating, he engaged in reportorial and editorial work at the New York World and other newspapers. In 1892 he was admitted to the bar. He served for some time as secretary and treasurer of the New York and Brooklyn Bridge.

=== New York City politics ===
In 1892, McClellan was elected president of the Board of Aldermen of New York City for the following two years, and for a part of 1894 he served as acting mayor. His success and popularity enabled him in 1894 to be elected as a United States Congressman (as a Democrat), a position he held until resigning when elected mayor of New York in late 1903.

In Congress, McClellan was a prominent member of the Ways and Means Committee. While in Congress he strongly opposed the war with Spain in 1898, and supported President McKinley's efforts to find a compromise. A conservative, McClellan spoke in favor of the gold standard, an issue that divided the fiscally conservative from the agrarian wing of the Democratic Party, although he avoided committing himself on the subject in the campaign of 1896 when he supported William Jennings Bryan, a leading silverite.

=== Mayor of New York City ===
In November 1903, McClellan defeated the sitting mayor, Seth Low (independent Fusion), for a two-year term. He was re-elected in 1905, after the restoration of four-year mayoral terms. The party did not nominate him in 1909 for a third term.

He is notable in the history of movie censorship for canceling all moving-picture exhibition licenses on Christmas Eve 1908, claiming that the new medium degraded the morals of the community and that celluloid film was an unacceptable fire hazard.

On October 27, 1904, the Interborough Rapid Transit, New York City's first subway, opened. McClellan was to start the first train at the City Hall Station, and then hand it over to an IRT motorman. However, he was enjoying himself so much that he refused to give up the controls until the train reached 103rd Street Station.

=== U.S. Presidential candidacy ===
McClellan ran for the Democratic nomination for president in 1904, receiving 3 votes on the first ballot at the Democratic National Convention.

== Later career ==
Throughout his political career, McClellan remained interested in education and in 1906 he was named honorary Chancellor of Union College. At Princeton he delivered the Stafford Little lectures on public affairs (1908–1910), served as university lecturer (1911–1912) and was subsequently appointed a professor of economic history.

McClellan served in World War I, entering the Army as major assigned to the Ordnance Department on May 9, 1917. He was honorably discharged in May 1919 with the rank of lieutenant colonel.

== Personal life and death ==
McClellan married Georgiana Heckscher on October 30, 1889. He was known to those who knew him well and family as “Max.”

McClellan died on November 30, 1940, one week after his 75th birthday, and was buried in Arlington National Cemetery.

== Selected works ==
- The Oligarchy of Venice. Boston: Houghton Mifflin, 1904.
- The Heel of War. New York: G.W. Dillingham Company, 1916.
- Venice and Bonaparte. Princeton: Princeton University Press, 1931.
- Modern Italy: A Short History. Princeton: Princeton University Press, 1933.
- The Gentleman and the Tiger: The Autobiography of George B. McClellan Jr.. Philadelphia: J.B. Lippincott, 1956.

== See also ==
- Mayor of New York City
- List of mayors of New York City
- New York City mayoral elections

U.S. House of Representatives
Preceded by William B. Cockran	Member of the U.S. House of Representatives from New York's 12th congressional district March 4, 1895 – December 21, 1903	Succeeded by William B. Cockran
Political offices
Preceded by Seth Low	Mayor of New York City; 1904–1909	Succeeded by William Jay Gaynor
