= William Mills Ivins Sr. =

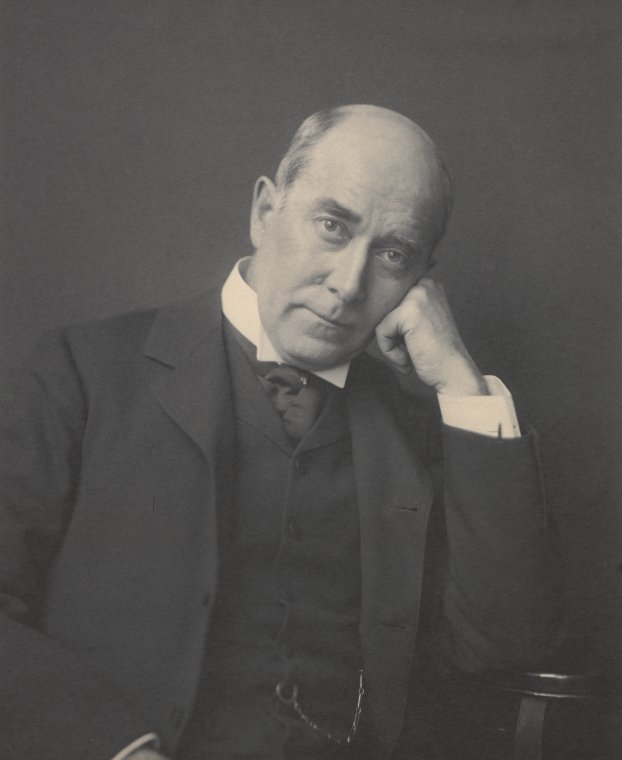
Ivins in 1910

William Mills Ivins Sr. (1851–1915) was a lawyer and Republican candidate for Mayor of New York City in 1905.

Ivins was one of New York City's famous reformers working on the improvement of the election law and fighting the widespread election fraud in New York City. He was the president of the Executive Committee of the Electoral Laws Improvement Association. Together with reformers like Albert S. Bard or William E. Curtis, he tried to complete the introduction of the secret ballot (Australian Ballot) to fight corruption. Ivins was also a member of the Honest Ballot Association, the City Reform Club, and Ballot Reform Committee of Citizens Union.

Ivins is the author of Machine Politics and Money in Elections in New York City. New York 1887.

Ivins was the father of William Ivins Jr., who was the curator of the department of prints at the Metropolitan Museum of Art, New York.
