= Ireland lobby in the United States =

Pro-Ireland groups and individuals in the U.S.

The Ireland lobby are groups and individuals who influence United States policy in both foreign and domestic affairs in support of causes related to Ireland and Irish American interests.

The main issues that have concerned the Irish American lobby historically have been support for Irish independence, support for the reunification of Ireland, support for Catholic parochial schools, and winning increased quotas for immigration from Ireland. In areas with large Irish populations, the Irish lobby has worked through the Democratic Party.

== Formal organizations ==
The Irish National Caucus (INC) was founded in 1974 by Father Seán Gabriel McManus at a meeting of the Ancient Order of Hibernians (AOH), an Irish-Catholic fraternal organization. The INC lobbies for the MacBride Principles, a manifesto that demands the cooperation of US companies doing business in Northern Ireland in fighting alleged discrimination and abuses there. The INC formerly operated a now-defunct political action committee named INC Irish PAC. The INC operates a tax-exempt charitable organization, the Irish Peace Foundation, to support "a non-violent solution in Ireland."

The Congressional Ad Hoc Committee on Irish Affairs was established in 1977; the Ancient Order of Hibernians was instrumental in its establishment. During his tenure in office, Congressman Mario Biaggi was Chairman of the Ad Hoc Congressional Committee for Irish Affairs.

The Ireland-US Council and the US-Ireland Alliance are organizations which encourage bilateral cooperation between the two countries.

The Irish Lobby for Immigration Reform (ILIR) is an organization founded in 2005 by Niall O'Dowd, Ciaran Staunton, and Kelly Fincham that campaigns for reform of United States immigration law and for legalizing an estimated 50,000 undocumented Irish immigrants. The ILIR visited the White House in 2012 to discuss a proposed Irish E-3 visa which would allow Irish people to work in the United States on a non-immigrant visa for two years, an interval which could be extended.
