= Des Wilson (Irish Catholic priest) =

Irish Catholic priest (1925–2019)

The Reverend Des Wilson

Personal life
- Born: Francis Desmond Wilson; 8 July 1925 Belfast, Northern Ireland
- Died: 5 November 2019 (aged 94)
- Education: St Malachy's College; Queen's University Belfast; St Patrick's College, Maynooth
- Known for: Promoting community-based education and enterprise in West Belfast; criticism of church hierarchy; facilitating republican-unionist dialogue
- Occupation: Priest and community organiser

Religious life
- Religion: Roman Catholic
- Ordination: 1949

Francis Desmond Wilson (1925–2019) was an Irish Catholic priest and church dissident who in the course of the Northern Ireland Troubles embraced ideas and practice associated, internationally, with liberation theology. Active in working-class and Irish nationalist West Belfast, he defended the right of communities failed by the state to create “alternative education, alternative welfare, alternative theatre, broadcasting, theological and political discussion, public inquiries and much else”. More controversially, he did not condemn paramilitary groups when they presented themselves, in his words, as “alternative police and alternative armies”.

Sanctioned by his bishop, from the mid-1970s Wilson supported his community ministry and engagement with writing, broadcasting and lectures, including in the United States where he promoted the McBride Principles for American investment. Alongside Fr Alec Reid, from the 1970s he facilitated discussions between republicans and loyalists, contacts which have been credited with helping prepare the ground for the Northern Ireland peace process.

Legacies of his community work in west Belfast include his contributions to the establishment of Springhill Community House, the Conway Education Centre and Conway Mill Community Enterprises.

== Early life ==
Des Wilson was born in Belfast in 1925, youngest of five sons to Emma (née McAvoy) and her husband William Wilson, a prominent publican. Wilson describes being raised in “mixed area” of south Belfast within a middle-class Catholic family “very conscious of their position and their need to improve it within the system”.

Wilson had ideas of becoming a scientist or journalist. He described setting these aside after witnessing in 1941 “science” in the form of the German Luftwaffe “blasting our streets and friends”, and, as if gratified that the Germans had recognised Northern Ireland as part of Britain, “journalism in the form of the Belfast Telegraph” describing the Blitz as “Ulster's night of thrills”. He also felt called to address "what was happening" to Catholics in Belfast. He had seen barricades thrown up around Catholic districts during the deadly riots of 1935, and family members "run the gauntlet” of Protestant school children who might later (in the Unionist establishment) “grow into men and women with power”.

With a number of his friends, Wilson believed what "we had been taught": that the church had "the answer to many of the problems to what life was about" and that as priests they could lead their community in making changes. Later he was to reflect:

It took a long time for us to realise how many problems were born and nourished inside the churches too, how many problems and hardships the churches condoned for the sake of gains they believed important to themselves. And what we thought was their ability to change the world was at best an ability to help people cope with a world that was not willing to be changed by anybody

After attending grammar school at St Malachy's College, Wilson entered the college's seminary while studying English and Philosophy at Queen's University. He proceeded to St Patrick's College Maynooth and was ordained in 1949 for the Diocese of Down and Conor.

== On the disregard for women ==
Newly ordained, age of 24, Wilson was assigned as a chaplain to the Mater Hospital in north Belfast. He was later to write that his experience at the hospital showed "very clearly the lowly status the church accorded women". Taking advantage of their sense of vocation, the Church "exploited" the nurses, and from the nurses he learned, in turn, how the Church abandoned the many women living with abusive husbands. Their problems, he concluded, were made all the worse by the Church's "rigorous opposition to divorce, and its refusal to agree with birth control". The Church was leaving women "in many ways impoverished both materially and spiritually".

== On the role of the Church in education ==
In 1952, Wilson was appointed as his former school's Spiritual Director. During his 14 years in post, Wilson's aversion to St. Malachy's “strict and sometimes vicious” disciplinary regime developed into a broader questioning of the Church's presence in schools. He hoped for a “radical review” that might persuade the Church to withdraw from the formal education of children (those with special needs excepted). Their instruction in religious devotion, he concluded, was little value as it induced young people to “to leave it as if it were just a part of their childhood”. “Worship of God is a matter for adults” and it was on their lifelong learning needs that the Church should concentrate its educational resources.

After leaving St Malachy's, he criticised the school system for segregating, not only Catholic from Protestant, but also “parents from their children, boys from girls, and older pupils from younger ones”. As an alternative he proposed a system of community education under which “the primacy of the parents in the education process is restored, the elderly of the community can share their knowledge, and the child is exposed to many different traditions”.

== Community priest ==
In August 1966, at a few days’ notice, Bishop William Philbin removed Wilson from St Malachy's. He reassigned him to a local parish, St John's, as a junior curate with a responsibility for the residents of housing estates in the greater Ballymurphy area. Wilson was distressed not only by the poverty he encountered, but also by the sense that, since their shoddy post-war construction by the city government, the projects had been the subject of “abusive propaganda” as a “problem area”.

He believed that the people did as much as those in other areas to help themselves, with the district's unemployed being amongst the most busy and creative. But “journalistic cynicism”, nonetheless, undermined their efforts.

The immediate challenge for Ballymurphy—and, as tensions crested in violence, Wilson was to propose, more broadly for Northern Ireland—was a “crisis of confidence” rooted in people's fear that “that they have nothing to offer each other”. The first step was to begin “with what people do best, whether it is arranging social functions or starting a new company”—such was the depressed state of these urban areas that “morale had to be raised on many fronts”. He was clear, however, that the “end product” must include “increased employment opportunities”.

Encountering refusals to build small business units for those who wanted to create work, to follow up private investment offers, to help cooperatives desperate for capital and, in 1979, the decision of the British Army to commandeer the premises of the Whiterock Industrial Estate, Wilson found the state not merely indifferent to the task but hostile.

At the same time, he was persuaded that the community could not rely on the understanding and support of their co-religionists in business and the professions.

I don't think people realised how deep and awful was the prejudice against their own people. The only difference between them was a difference in income. To say that Catholics would look after fellow Catholics and that Protestants would look after fellow Protestants--that was not so and we learned that very tragically as time went on.

== Criticism of the Church's response to the Troubles ==
In Wilson's estimation the Church itself was failing in solidarity. For all its international connections, money and “two thousand years’ experience dealing with political and economic regimes of every kind”, he suggested that for the distressed community in West Belfast the Church might as well have been “an impoverished, unconnected heap founded last Thursday”. Even in the midst of a humanitarian crisis—in 1969, when thousands of refugees streamed into the Falls Road—the Church failed in practical relief.

Had the Church "rallied to the side of the oppressed nationalist people", Wilson believed it would have rendered "impossible" the developments from which violence was to flow in the coming decades: "internment-without-trial, the torture, the H-Blocks and the hunger strike". In a “highly volatile” situation requiring “all the resources we could get to heal the poverty and the hurt suffered by so many people”, Wilson found his church superiors more interested in “controlling what there was than creating something better.” Among the “damaging” results were policies that failed to give “adequate place to women”, “marginalised” others who should have welcome, and squandered the “potential of priests" to set society on a gentler path.

In 1973, in an address to a Justice and Peace Conference, he wrote:

If the institutions of our society, the courts, the police the universities and the Church, had given the same measure of recognition and protection and a sense of dignity to those people as the small guerrilla groups have given them, then they would have as much loyalty to those institutions.

Among politically engaged priests, in his criticism of the Church Wilson was not alone. Fr Denis Faul, who campaigned against security-force abuses, argued that in failing to "understand the suffering of his own people", Philbin conceded leadership by default to the Provisionals (described by the bishop as being "of the devil"). Fr Pat Buckley suggested that had the bishop "led two hundred thousand people up the Falls Road demanding civil rights, the Provos might not have been necessary".

Concluding that he could not detach himself from the policies of the Church without “detaching” himself from the priesthood, in 1975 Wilson resigned his curatorship. According to Wilson, Bishop Philbin took it as an act of defiance, accused Wilson of threatening to destroy the Church, and never spoke to him again.

== Springhill Community House and Conway Mill ==
Barred from officiating in church, Wilson said Mass in his Ballymurphy home, and with help from Quaker and Presbyterian friends (and a course in community relations at Queens University) concentrated on supporting local community initiatives.

In January 1972, Wilson had moved out of his church accommodation to live among his parishioners in public housing. Wilson operated 123 Springhill Avenue as an open Community House. An admirer, Fr Gerry McFlynn, found the house "reminiscent of the Catholic Worker houses set up by Dorothy Day in the US in the 1940s for feeding people, providing liturgies and, interestingly, Clarification of Thought sessions following talks by invited guests". Noelle Ryan, a former nun drawn to the house, saw Wilson as a worker priest after the model of those clergy in France who, freed from parochial duties, sought connection with the working class by living and working among them.

With Wilson's support, Ryan helped launch education classes tutored by volunteers from the Workers Educational Association and the Ulster Peoples College. Conceding to local demand, these were soon joined by outreach to children expelled, or truant, from school—the "school refusers project". The Community House also experimented in different forms of public discussion, inquiry and theatre.

In 1983, the adult education classes were rehoused and expanded as the Conway Education Centre in a vacant mill of the same name off the Falls Road. Consistent with Wilson's priorities, the new Conway Mill project, also sought to incubate small indigenous economic enterprises. Business start-ups, especially those attempted by young people and by cooperatives, were offered low rent facilities. The initiative was not without precedent. In Ardoyne, Holy Cross priest Myles Kavanagh, and parish sisters Joan Brosnan and Mary Turley, had set up the Flax Trust in 1977, and one of its first projects had been the transformation of the former Brookfield linen mill into a community business centre.

In November 1984, the government decided to withhold public funding from the Conway development, and cautioned businesses and community organisations that if they moved into the Mill they would be denied support. Sinn Féin's Gerry Adams noted that this came after the Mill had hosted a community-led public enquiry into the killing of a young man by a police-fired plastic bullet. State papers point to the suspicion that Conway Community Enterprises was “a front organisation for Sinn Féin in the community” and that armed republicans might be the beneficiary. In 1989, the Mill association sued the British television company ITV whose Cook Report, "Blood Money", alleged that the Conway Mill was "the financial nerve centre of the Provisional IRA".

Wilson suggested that the underlying motive for denying of government support (a decision reversed in 1995) was a policy of deliberately de-industrialising Catholic areas.

== Protestant and Catholic Encounter ==
In 1969, Wilson was a founding member of PACE (Protestant and Catholic Encounter). It was an initiative that, among others, attracted Catholics who, seeking to test the boundaries of liberal unionism (offered by the then Prime Minister, Terence O’Neill), had seen their applications to join the governing Ulster Unionist Party rejected. After a few years Wilson “slipped away”. PACE had talked about removing the stigma from mixed marriages, and ensuring equality in the workplace. But, in Wilson's view, they were “clobbered by two things. First the [Protestant] evangelists, such as [Ian] Paisley, and second by the clerics and hierarchy who took control and turned [PACE] into an ecumenical movement without real significance”.

It had been a mistake, he concluded, to imagine that if only Catholics and Protestants could be brought together, political solutions could be found, and to underestimate the determination of the regime to drive them apart whenever their coming together becomes “politically inconvenient”. In the PACE journal of December 1970, Wilson argued that “the first stepping stone to better community relations” was not, in any case, integration. It was the “development of communities which are accepted at their own evaluation”. What matters is not whether they regard themselves “totally Protestant” or “totally Catholic”, but whether they believe they can manage their own affairs and, fearing neither themselves or others, that they have “something to offer”.

From his experience with PACE, and with other encounter groups, Wilson was also to conclude that there had been arrogance in the “assumption that Christians have some sort of privileged leadership to offer”. In Ireland, it was they, not "atheistic Marxists or agnostics", who created most of the oppressions people have experienced. It was doubtful whether Christians could "solve the problems of any nation".

== The McBride Principles ==
After his fall out with Bishop Philbin was made public, Wilson found, somewhat to his surprise, that he had new access to the pages of the leading nationalist paper, The Irish News, and to the studios of the state broadcaster, the BBC. The increased exposure, together with republican endorsements, led to invitations to speak in the United States. There he took the opportunity to help promote the McBride Principles.

The 1984 MacBride Principles were a set of fair employment guidelines for US firms in Northern Ireland. To help redress a history of anti-Catholic discrimination, companies were called upon to increase job opportunities for underrepresented religious groups, to ban political and religious symbols from the workplace and to ensure safe travel for employees.

Wilson seconded the efforts of a panel of sponsors that prominently included two other Irish priests, Brian Brady and Seán McManus. But their adoption was opposed not only by the British government, but also, according to Wilson, by senior Catholic churchmen. With Wilson giving much credit to Brady, a long-time human rights campaigner, and to the Northern Ireland trade unionist Inez McCormack, the campaign successfully pressed the British government to introduce fair-employment legislation. In 1998, the Principles, having already been adopted in numerous U.S. jurisdictions, were signed into U.S. federal law by President Clinton.

== Liberation Theology and the refusal to condemn paramilitaries ==
Wilson has been credited with applying ideas of Liberation Theology. In their concern for the poor and for the liberation of the oppressed, these comprise a Christian theological approach that engages in socio-economic analyses and endorses social and political activism.

In An End to the Silence (1985), Wilson embraced the "fresh thinking of liberation theology". Given the "low intellectual level of political and religious discussion" in Northern Ireland, he suggested that "the idea of the Christian religion or philosophy could be a liberating force" had been essentially foreign. Within the churches, the prevailing view remained that "forgiveness and love can only be exercised when a firm framework of law and order has been established by the state's military and police".

It is unclear as to how far Wilson himself read in the work of those theologians who, in Latin America, promoted the liberationist "preferential option for the poor". His close friend and biographer (Des Wilson: A Voice for the Poor and Oppressed) Fr Joe McVeigh insists that Wilson "developed his own liberation theology, quite apart from that of Latin America". Wilson, however, did refer to the Latin American experience. He was moved, for example, to juxtapose Archbishop Óscar Romero of El Salvador, an icon for liberationists following his assassination in 1980, to Mother Theresa. Wilson had personally hosted Mother Theresa in 1972 and, until she withdrew them in 1975 under pressure, he believed, from his church superiors, had supported the continuing presence of her Missionaries of Charity from Kolkata. Nonetheless, he remarked:

We could see the difference between the two people. Mother Theresa was content to pick up the sad pieces left by vicious political and economic system and got she Nobel Prize while Romero, who attacked the causes of misery as well as picking up the pieces, was shot in the head.

Wilson also claimed that, in "refusing to condemn those Christians who took arms in their struggle for justice", he followed the example of Brazilian archbishop Hélder Câmara. During the military dictatorship in Brazil, Câmara, who called on clergy to engage in the struggle for justice without fear of identification with the revolutionary left ("When I give food to the poor, they call me a saint. When I ask why they are poor, they call me a communist"), refused to condemn armed resistance. It was not his choice ("not my road, not my way to apply the Gospels"), but he would never say "to use weapons against an oppressor is immoral or anti-Christian".

Wilson maintained that the right of oppressed and disadvantaged communities to create institutional alternatives (alternative education, welfare, theatre, broadcasting, "theological and political discussion, public inquiries and much else”) extended to “alternative police and alternative armies”. He claimed that what the British government was doing in Northern Ireland was "unjust, vicious and degrading", and there was "no way out of this impasse except by some kind of force": He might hope for some kind of non-violent direct action but he could not condemn those who choose something more radical.

=== A new "theology of pacifism" ===
Wilson identified himself as a pacifist but refused invitations to condemn the IRA or other paramilitary groups active in Northern Ireland. Condemnation, he argued, does not advance the practical task of the pacifist: to "do whatever is possible to prevent war happening, try to lessen its impact while it is going on, [and] try to stop it". Condemning one party, particularly that which challenges a government that has the resources to make peace if it wants to, is "an intellectually lazy way to assert one's own respectability while changing nothing".

Wilson did not believe that Catholic moral teaching "forbade people to fight against a bad government that would not be reformed". What was needed in a Church, that was not itself pacifist (as a schoolchild he recalls being taught to revere General Franco as a soldier of Christ), was a new "theology of pacifism". This would have to do more than simply satisfy the needs of "an oppressive government or of people seeking undemanding respectability".

It could not be the absolute pacifism of Fr Daniel Berrigan. Rather, as Dutch Green MEP Fr Herman Verbeek argued in a Conway Mill debate with the American Jesuit, it had to be one that recognised the predicament of those who had "a duty to protect others--their families their homes". This, Wilson argued, was not a theoretical question for his community. Had people believed that their religion required that they be total pacifists, he suggested "there would not have been a Catholic home still standing in Belfast by the end of 1969".

=== The paramilitaries ===
Working-class Protestant districts also had the right, in Wilson's view, to challenge the state's monopoly of organised violence. Because of state-agent infiltration, he had doubts as to the authenticity of some of the loyalist paramilitary groups that emerged. But the "reality" remained:

we have a small group of men driven to take up arms against their oppressors. It doesn't matter if you are talking about the I.R.A., the U.D.A., or anybody else. If you get close enough to these men you discover they are the type who wouldn't have taken up arms unless they were driven to it, unlike the soldiers taking up arms as a professions, or the politicians who use violence to further their own political ends.

In the mid-1970s, Wilson did "get close" to two leading West Belfast loyalists: UDA spokesman Sammy Smyth, who as community worker had participated in a number of cross-community, and cross-border, projects and events; and John McKeague, a founding member of the Red Hand Commando who, in prison, had mounted a hunger strike to protest the Special Powers Act. According to Wilson, in 1979, both loyalists had joined a Protestant delegation to Tomás Cardinal Ó Fiaich to assure him that should the Pope extend his visit to Ireland by crossing the border to the cathedral city of Armagh, he would "not only be left alone but would be treated with respect".

Wilson held two republican militants in particular regard. Seamus Costello he viewed as "one of the most acutely intelligent revolutionary thinkers in Ireland". Costello, a leader of the Irish Republican Socialist Party and of INLA, its armed wing, was assassinated in October purportedly by a member of the Official IRA from which he had originally split. For Sinn Féin, and reputed PIRA, leader Gerry Adams (at whose wedding he had officiated) Wilson expressed "tremendous respect". Adams he regarded as "one of the very few people who could actually bring a military campaign into a political campaign".

=== Support for Sinn Féin ===
In the 1980s, defying the bishops' proscription of Sinn Féin, Wilson defended the right of "practising faithful Catholics" at the ballot box to "vote that their government should be disciplined by the vote if possible and by force of arms if necessary". That the force of arms proved necessary is a position Wilson maintained publicly. Speaking in 2004, at the funeral of Joe Cahill, Wilson explained that this had been the lesson the former PIRA Chief of Staff, and "the people of his tradition", had been taught by "a one-way history of horrors". Their virtue (Cahill was key supporter of the Adams-McGuinness political strategy) was to recognise that, although not to be avoided, war should be "stopped at the earliest possible moment."

While criticising the actions of the security forces and blaming the state for creating the conditions for war, Wilson did not himself hazard a defence of actual PIRA operations. He did not seek to explain how campaigns of assassination and of lethal bombings advanced "a fight against bad government". Nonetheless, together with his dissent from the Church on "divorce, the papacy and education", Wilson's in-principle acceptance of "the armed struggle" defined him for Sinn Féin's Danny Morrison as "a priest of the people" (An Phoblacht 22 April 1982). There was not the same embrace for fathers Denis Faul or Pat Buckley who, despite themselves highlighting the same injustices the republicans cited in their defence, condemned their violence, including the sacrifice of life in the 1981 hunger strike.

== Mediator ==
Late in 1971, Wilson arranged for his colleague in PACE, Eric Gallagher, former President of the Methodist Church in Ireland, to meet in Dundalk with PIRA leaders Seán Mac Stíofáin, Rory O'Brady and Joe Cahill. The republicans wanted the churchman to convey to the British government (through Opposition leader Harold Wilson) the offer of a two-week truce, during which British troops (deployed on the streets since August 1969) would be withdrawn to their barracks. Nothing transpired until the following June when, as a prelude to secret talks with the government (for which Adams was to join Mac Stíofáin in London), PIRA began a "bi-lateral truce". The talks were inconclusive and the truce lasted barely two weeks.

In 1975, with Clonard-based Redemptorist Fr Alec Reid, Wilson sought to intercede in the increasingly deadly feud between the Provisionals and the Official IRA. Brought together in Wilson's Springhill home, representatives of each organisation eventually agreed a ceasefire, with the clergymen chairing regular incident meetings.

In 1977, Wilson helped set up meeting between Gerry Adams and Desmond Boal QC. Boal was a unionist barrister (and the former Stormont MP for Shankill) who in court had represented republicans as well as loyalists At the time, Boal was co-operating with Seán MacBride as joint mediator in confidential negotiations between the Provisionals and the Ulster Volunteer Force about a federal settlement for Ireland. A short time later Wilson drove Adams to a meeting with McKeague, then flirting with the idea of an independent Ulster. Inasmuch as they were "frank", Adams found the meetings "constructive", but could find no common political ground.

When McKeague was assassinated by the Irish National Liberation Army (INLA) in January 1982, Wilson attended his funeral: "John did a lot of terrible things but he was willing to talk to us". Wilson insisted that what was true for his relationship with McKeague and with Smyth, held for his friendship with Ronnie Bunting, the Republican Socialist and founder member of the INLA, and Máire Drumm of Sinn Féin, both whom were also assassinated: no government was going to tell him how to behave toward those it proscribed as "terrorists".

In January 1987, Wilson brokered a meeting between leaders of the INLA and its break-away faction, the Irish People's Liberation Organisation (IPLO), with whom they were engaged in a deadly feud. At the meeting, outside Drogheda in the Republic which Wilson had failed to reach on time, the IPLO pulled guns on the INLA delegation, killing Ta Power and John O'Reilly.

Wilson and Reid continued what Adams described as "an outreach programme”: they "spoke to unionist paramilitaries and facilitated meetings between republicans and loyalists". Without this work, Adams suggested there would have been "no peace process". However, it was primarily Reid who brokered the higher-level contacts contributing to the republican ceasefires of 1994 and 1997, which in turn facilitated the 1998 Belfast ("Good Friday" Agreement). In contrast to Wilson, Reid enjoyed the confidence of the church hierarchy in the form of the express support of Cardinal Ó Fiaich.

== Call for Church reform ==
In the 1990s there was a degree of reconciliation between Wilson and Church hierarchy. From 2000 he began to receive the modest Church stipend he believed he had been due since retiring from his parish duties in 1975. He did not, however, moderate his dissent from Church doctrine or criticism of the "Vatican apparatus" (which he proposed should be made "irrelevant", if not dismantled). In his 2005 autobiography, questioning the idea that we should "allow others to speak for us to God", Wilson called for a "democratising of churches", a theme of two ecumenical conferences he helped organise in Dublin and Belfast.

In 2010, Wilson was one of 72 signatories to the “first statement” of a new Association of Catholic Priests. It described the association as "a voice for Irish Catholic priests at a time when that voice is largely silent and needs to be expressed” and as an opportunity to seek “full implementation of the vision and teaching of the Second Vatican Council”. Special emphasis would be laid on "the primacy of the individual conscience, the status and active participation of all the baptised [and] the task of establishing a church where all believers will be treated as equal” and on a culture of transparency "particularly in the appointment of church leaders”.

Members of the association were subsequently censured by the Roman Curia. The Congregation for the Doctrine of the Faith placed restrictions on the association's founder, Fr Tony Flannery who is a member of the Redemptorist Congregation. He was advised by Rome to go to a monastery where he might "pray and reflect" on his heterodox views and his role with the association.

== Death and commemoration ==
Fr Des Wilson died on 19 November 2019 in Belfast. Instead of wreaths, he asked mourners to donate to the Ballymurphy Massacre Memorial Garden. The garden was dedicated to the victims of the Ballymurphy massacre of August 1971, which saw the killing in the district of eleven civilians by soldiers of the 1st Battalion, Parachute Regiment. The victims included Fr Hugh Mullan, who had been a student of Wilson's at St Malachy's. He was shot while going to the aid of a wounded man.

Following a requiem Mass at Corpus Christi Church in Ballymurphy, Wilson was buried in Milltown Cemetery. Senior Sinn Féin politicians Gerry Adams and Michelle O'Neill were among those who took turns to carry his coffin.

Des Wilson was predeceased by his brothers James, Kevin, Liam, and Gerard.

In August 2021, prior to the film premiering at the 2022 Galway Film Fleadh, the West Belfast festival, Féile an Phobail screened a cut of Fr Des – The Way He Saw It, a documentary on Wilson's life and legacy by director Vincent Kinnard. Narrated by Wilson's friend, the north Belfast-born actor Stephen Rea, the film features contributions from Rev Brian Smeaton, a Church of Ireland minister who was a trusted interlocutor for Wilson in loyalist West Belfast, adult and continuing education specialist Eilish Rooney, and veteran civil rights campaigner Bernadette Devlin-McAliskey.

In 2022, events marking the 50th anniversary of Springhill Community House saw the display of Wilson's personal archive, thousands of items relating to his clerical life and to his political and community engagement, collected with National Lottery funding by UCD sociologist Tiarnán Ó Muilleoir.

In 2026, marking the Wilson' 100th anniversary, Belfast's Brassneck Theatre Company’s revived Brian Campbell's one-man play Des at the Roddy McCorley Republican Heritage Centre in West Belfast. Actor Jimmy Doran reprised the role he had performed twenty-five years before, in 2001 when the play was first staged for the Ballymurphy community.

== Publications ==
An End To Silence, Dublin: Mercier Press. ISBN 9780853427568, 1985.

"Father Des", in Tony Parker ed., May the Lord in His Mercy be kind to Belfast, London, Jonathan Cape. ISBN 0224033123, 1993.

The Way I see it: an Autobiography by Fr. De. Wilson, Belfast: Beyond the Pale Publications. ISBN 9781900960281, 2005.
