= John J. Marchi =

American politician (1921–2009)

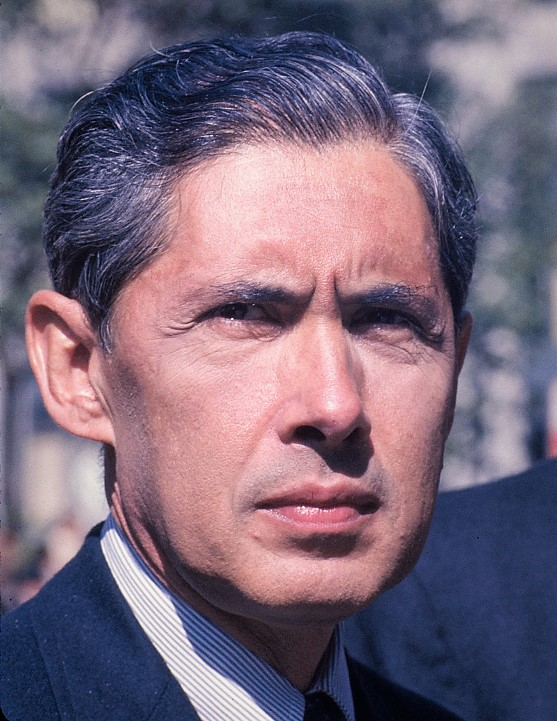
- Marchi circa 1970

Member of the New York State Senate
- In office January 1, 1957 – December 31, 2006
- Preceded by: Edward V. Curry
- Succeeded by: Andrew Lanza
- Constituency: 19th district (1957–1965); 26th district (1966); 23rd district (1967–1972); 24th district (1973–2006)

Personal details
- Born: Giovanni Marchi; May 20, 1921 Staten Island, New York, U.S.
- Died: April 25, 2009 (aged 87) Lucca, Italy
- Party: Republican
- Spouse: Maria Luisa Davini (m. 1948)
- Children: 2
- Education: Manhattan College; St. John's University School of Law (JD); Brooklyn Law School (JSD)

John Joseph Marchi (born Giovanni Marchi; May 20, 1921 – April 25, 2009) was an American Republican Party politician and attorney from Staten Island, New York. Marchi served in the New York State Senate from 1957 to 2006, making him the longest-serving state legislator in New York history. He was also the Republican nominee for Mayor of New York City in 1969 and 1973.

== Early life, education, and military service ==
Giovanni Marchi was born in 1921 to parents who had immigrated to the U.S. from Lucca, Tuscany, Italy. He attended parochial schools on Staten Island before graduating with honors from Manhattan College in 1942. In World War II, he served with the Coast Guard on antisubmarine duty in the Atlantic and with the Navy in the Okinawa campaign in the Pacific. Marchi earned a J.D. from St. John's University School of Law in 1950 and a J.S.D. from Brooklyn Law School in 1953. Marchi also served as a Commander in the Active Reserve after World War II, retiring from the service in 1982.

== Professional life ==
Marchi was first elected to the New York State Senate on November 6, 1956 after having served as a Senate aide. He was a member of the New York State Senate from 1957 to 2006.

Marchi was active in conservative issues, particularly of a fiscal nature, during his long Senate tenure. Marchi wrote the state laws to help New York City recover from its fiscal crisis and near bankruptcy in the 1970s.

Marchi ran twice for Mayor of New York City. He won a surprise upset over Mayor John V. Lindsay in the 1969 Republican primary. He ran in the general election against Lindsay, who was still the Liberal Party nominee, and Democratic Comptroller Mario Procaccino. Marchi and Procaccino lost to Lindsay.

Marchi was the Republican nominee again in 1973, but he lost to Comptroller Abraham D. Beame, the Democrat that Lindsay had defeated in 1965, while he came in ahead of Mario Biaggi and Albert H. Blumenthal. Previously, he ran unsuccessfully as the Republican nominee for Borough President of Staten Island in 1961.

Marchi worked to improve public education in the 1980s and was appointed as Chairman of the Temporary State Commission on New York City School Governance in 1989. This commission conducted a two-year study on the control and governance in New York City schools and provided recommendations to the New York State Legislature on improving administration and public participation in the school system. Senator Marchi also provided assistance to the College of Staten Island so that the school could obtain the land of the former Willowbrook State School for a campus.

Marchi was a longtime advocate for the secession of Staten Island from New York City. He wrote a law which backed a secession referendum in 1993. While the referendum passed, the legislature has not allowed Staten Island to become its own city. As a part of his Staten Island secession work, Marchi drafted a model charter for a new City of Staten Island. Marchi also drafted the law to close the Fresh Kills Landfill on Staten Island.

Marchi was the only Republican member of the State Senate who opposed the death penalty.

Marchi was a member of the executive committee and the Board of Governors of the Council of State Governments. He was appointed by U.S. President Richard M. Nixon to the National Advisory Committee on Drug Abuse Prevention.

== Senate leadership positions ==
- Chairman of the Joint Liquor Laws Committee
- Chairman of the Senate Commerce and Navigation Committee
- Chairman of the Joint New York City Docks Committee
- Chairman of the Joint Alcoholic Beverage Control Law Committee
- Chairman of the Senate Constitutional Affairs Subcommittee
- Chairman of the Senate City of New York Committee
- Chairman of the Joint Intergovernmental Cooperation Committee
- Chairman of the Senate Finance Committee
- Chairman of the Senate Corporations, Authorities and Commissions Committee
- Vice President Pro Tempore of the Senate
- Chairman of the Temporary State Commission on New York City School Governance
- Chairman of the New York State Charter Commission for Staten Island
- Chairman of the Staten Island Charter Commission
- Deputy Majority Leader for Intergovernmental Relations
- Chairman of the Senate Ethics Committee
- Assistant Majority Whip
- Assistant Majority Leader for Conference Operations
- Chairman of the Senate Task Force on World Trade Center Recovery

== Personal life ==
In 1948, Marchi married Maria Luisa Davini, an Italian immigrant also from Lucca; they had two daughters.

On October 19, 2006, Marchi passed out and fell from his chair at the annual Alfred E. Smith Dinner at the Waldorf-Astoria.

Marchi died from pneumonia on April 25, 2009, while vacationing in Lucca with his wife and other family members.

== Legacy ==
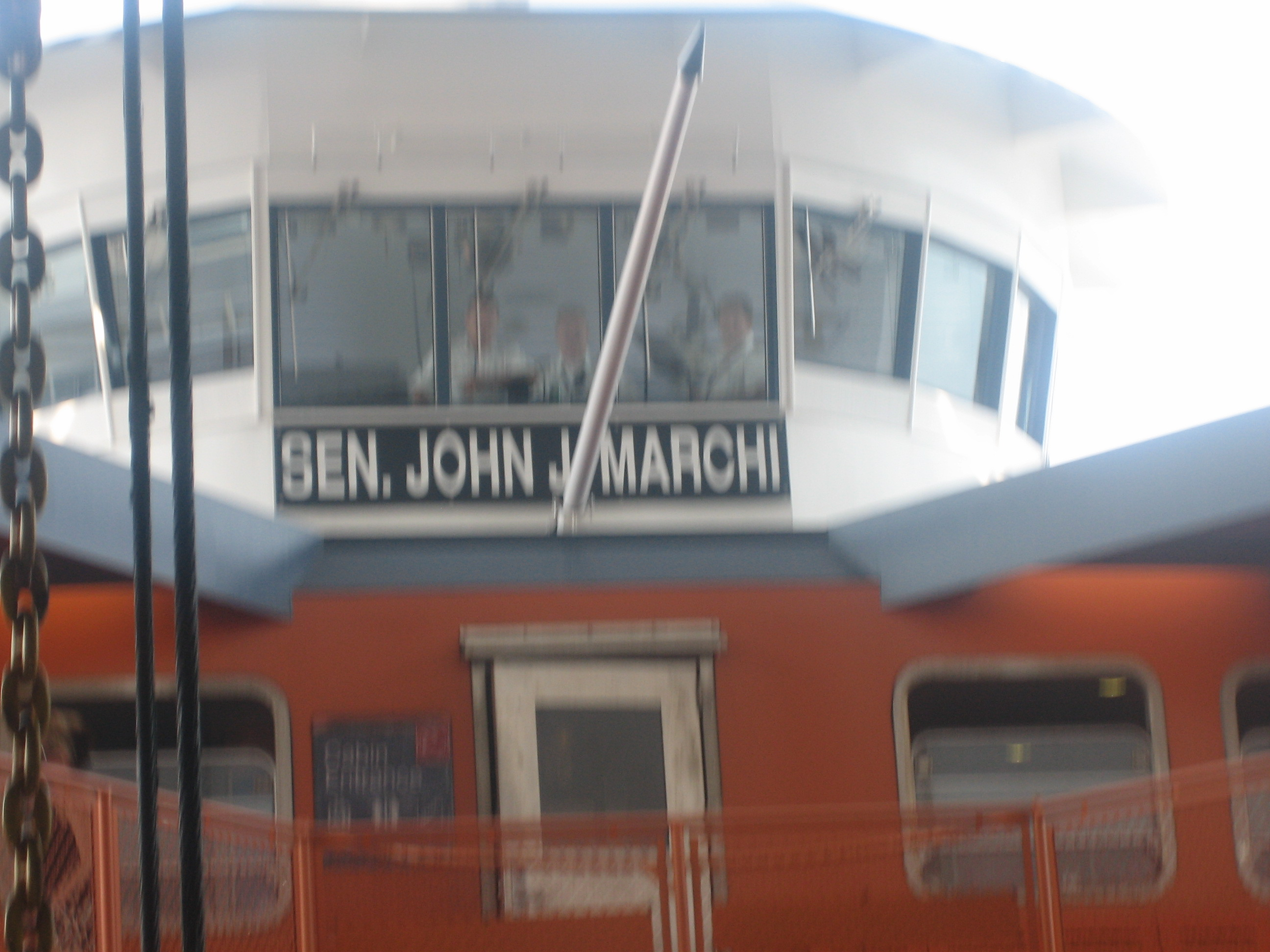
The Staten Island Ferry boat Sen. John J. Marchi, which shuttles passengers from the ferry terminal at the southern tip of Manhattan to the Staten Island ferry terminal in St. George.

A new Staten Island Ferry boat was named in Marchi's honor in 2006.

John Marchi Hall was named in his honor on campus of the College of Staten Island in 2006. Also known as Building 2N, John Marchi Hall is located on the north side of the campus.

A collection of Marchi's legislative and personal files is available at the College of Staten Island Archives and Special Collections.

New York State Senate
Preceded by Edward V. Curry	Member of the New York State Senate from the 19th district 1957–1965	Succeeded by William C. Thompson
Preceded by Harry Kraf	Member of the New York State Senate from the 26th district 1966	Succeeded by Whitney North Seymour Jr.
Preceded by Irwin R. Brownstein	Member of the New York State Senate from the 23rd district 1967–1972	Succeeded by Carol Bellamy
Preceded by Paul P. E. Bookson	Member of the New York State Senate from the 24th district 1973–2006	Succeeded by Andrew Lanza
Preceded by Warren M. Anderson	Chairman of the New York State Senate Finance Committee; 1973–1988	Succeeded by Tarky Lombardi Jr.
Party political offices
Preceded by P. Vincent Sullivan	Republican nominee for Borough President of Staten Island; 1961	Succeeded by Robert T. Connor
Preceded by John V. Lindsay	Republican nominee for Mayor of New York City; 1969, 1973	Succeeded by Roy M. Goodman
Preceded by William F. Buckley Jr.	Conservative Party nominee for Mayor of New York City; 1969	Succeeded by Mario Biaggi
