= Fred Munce =

Frederick Larmour Munce, MBE (b 1948) is an Irish Methodist known for taking an active role in the Northern Ireland Peace Process.

Munce trained for the Methodist Ministry at Edgehill Theological College. He has been an active facilitator of anti-sectarianism, community relations and reconciliation over several decades. In South Londonderry he pioneered cross community projects, and was invited to speak on these to the House of Lords. Later in the north of the city he worked with homeless men and disadvantaged families. He was also in North Belfast during times of extreme sectarian violence and chaired several committees aimed at getting people into work and living harmoniously together. He also travelled across the world to set up projects for refugee communities on four continents. In 2002, he was made a Member of the Order of the British Empire. In 2003 he was awarded an Honorary Doctorate by the University of Ulster.
