= Des Wilson (disambiguation) =

Des Wilson is a British-born New Zealand businessman.

Des Wilson may also refer to:

- Des Wilson (Irish Catholic priest) (1922–2019), West Belfast community organiser and cleric
- Desi Wilson, American baseball player
