= Eric Gallagher =

President of the Methodist Church in Ireland during 1967

Robert David Eric Gallagher CBE, (24 August 1913 – 30 December 1999) was President of the Methodist Church in Ireland during 1967.

Gallagher was born on 24 August 1913 in Ballybay, Count Monaghan, to Robert Gallagher from County Fermanagh, and his wife Helen (née McIlroy) from County Tyrone. Robert was a Methodist minister who later served as president of the Methodist conference from 1946 to 1947. His ministry required frequent moves to new congregations, and the family relocated seven times before Eric was 20.

He graduated from Trinity College Dublin in 1936, with a BA in modern languages and English literature. Two years later he graduated from Edgehill Theological College in Belfast, and in 1941 he was ordained. The rest of his career was spent in various ministries and chaplaincies in Belfast.

Late in 1971, in a meeting arranged by West Belfast priest Des Wilson, Gallagher had discussion in Dundalk with Provisional IRA leaders Seán Mac Stíofáin, Rory O'Brady and Joe Cahill. The republicans wanted him to convey to the British Government (through Opposition leader Harold Wilson) the offer of a two-week truce, during which British forces (on the streets since August 1969) would be withdrawn to barracks. The message was conveyed, but nothing transpired until the following June when, as a prelude to secret talks with the government PIRA began "bi-lateral truce" on the 26th. The ceasefire ended on 9 July 1972.

In 1974 he was one of a group of Protestant clergymen who met with Provisional IRA officers in Feakle, County Clare in the 1970s to try to broker a lasting cessation of the conflict. The meeting was broken up by the Gardaí but the IRA officers, including David O'Connell and Seamus Twomey, had already left.

He spent 22 years as superintendent of the Belfast Central Mission, from 1957 until 1979.

He died on 30 December 1999, aged 86, and was interred at the Lisburn New Cemetery at Blaris, County Down.

== Legacy ==
At Gallagher's funeral in January 2000, Cardinal Cahal Daly, with whom Gallagher had jointly chaired a social issues group behind the Violence in Ireland report to the churches stated: "Not many people have been clear and steady beacons of light in the darkness of the last 30 years. Eric Gallagher was one ... [I]t was a privilege to work with him ... he took risks for peace."

== Other ==
Gallagher was the subject of Peacemaker, written by Dennis Cooke.
