= 1973 New York City mayoral election =

- November 6, 1973
- Registered: 3,565,147
- Turnout: 1,790,053; 50.21% (▼31.00 pp)
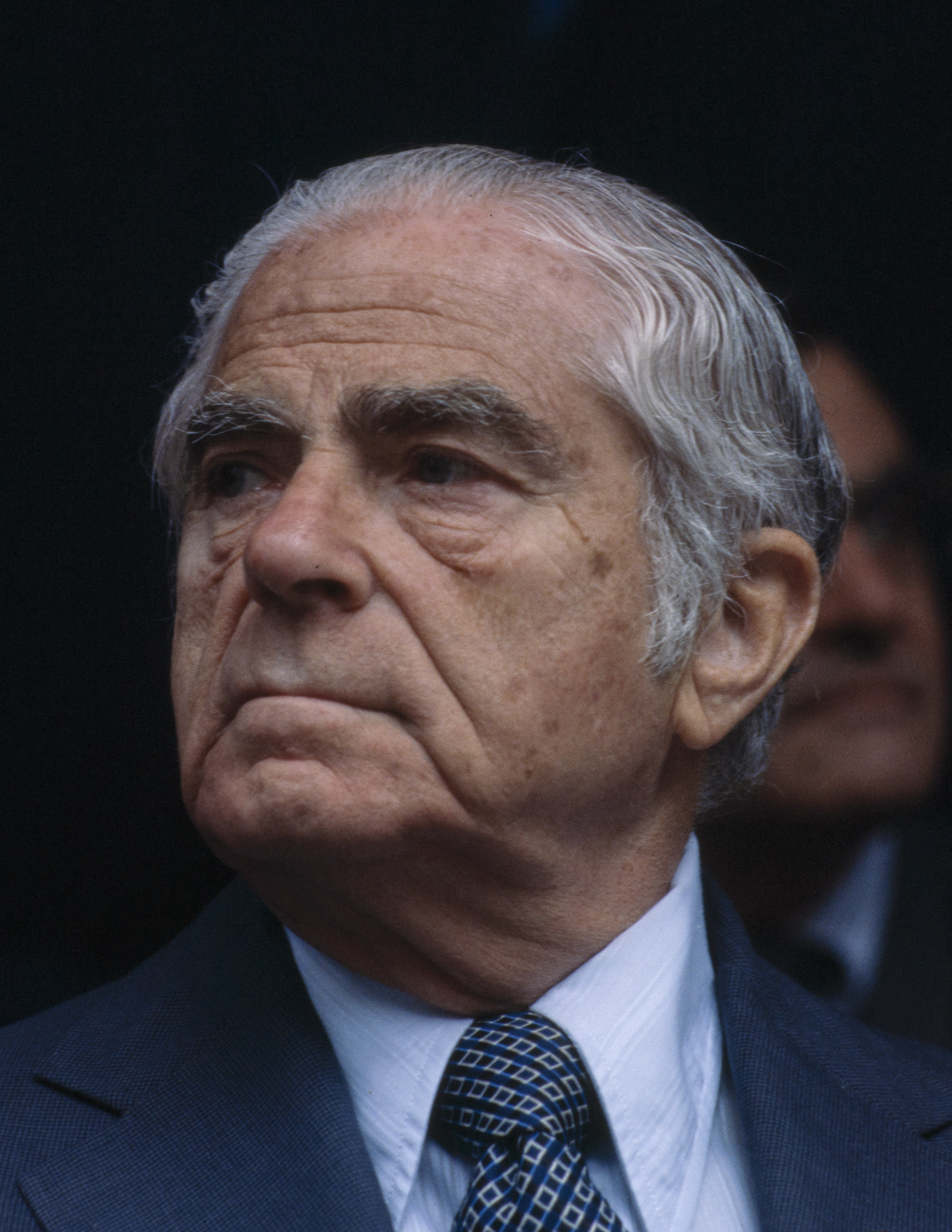

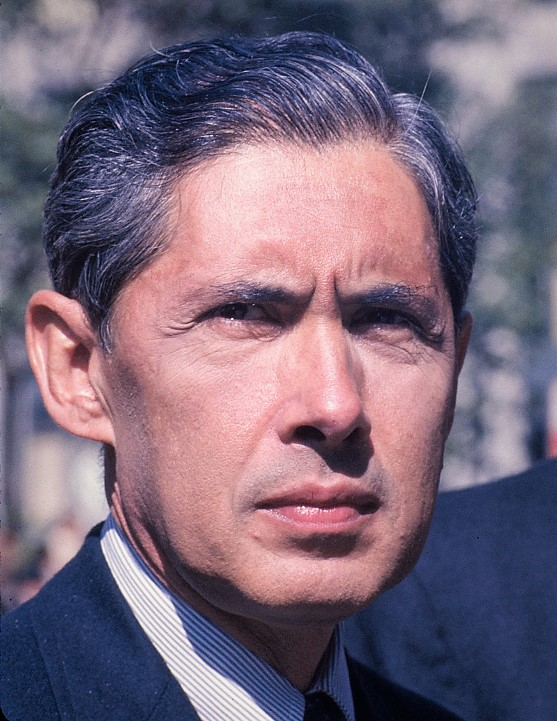

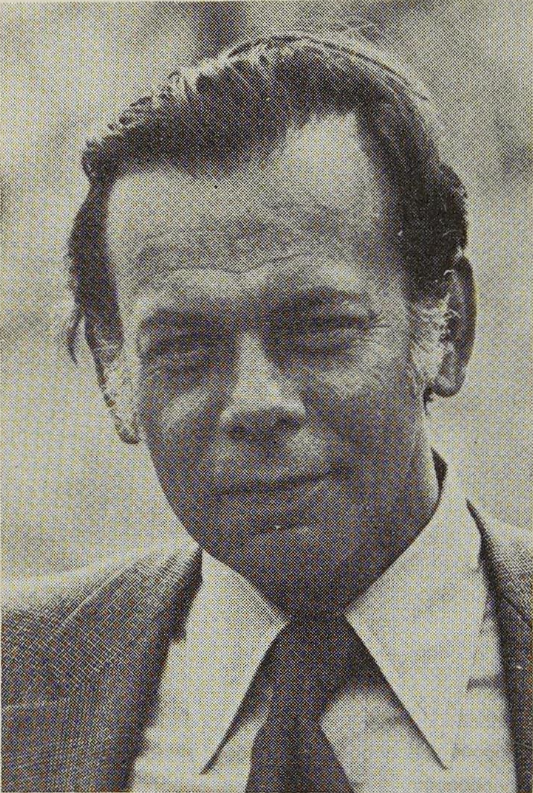

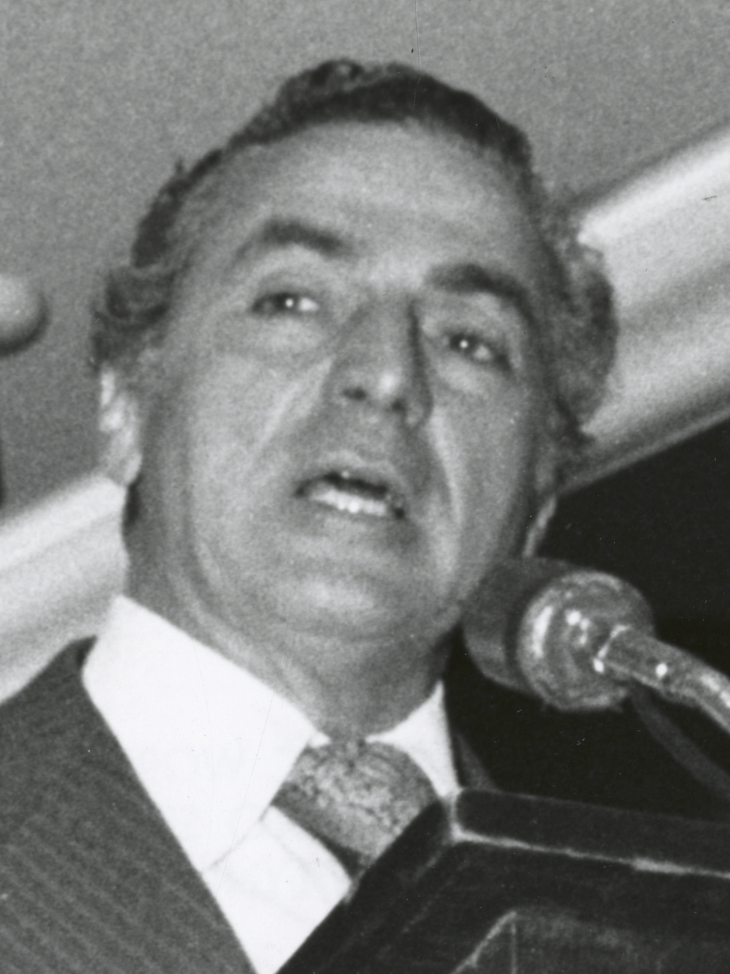
Candidate	Abraham Beame	John J. Marchi
Party	Democratic	Republican
Alliance	Civil Service & Fusion	Integrity
Popular vote	963,542	274,052
Percentage	56.5%	16.1%
Candidate	Albert H. Blumenthal	Mario Biaggi
Party	Liberal	Conservative
Alliance	Good Government	Safe City
Popular vote	262,600	186,977
Percentage	15.4%	11.0%
- Results by Borough; Beame: 40–50% 50–60% 60–70%
Mayor before election
John Lindsay
Democratic
Elected Mayor
Abraham Beame
Democratic

The 1973 New York City mayoral election occurred on Tuesday, November 6, 1973. Incumbent mayor John Lindsay did not run for a third term in office. New York City Comptroller Abraham Beame was elected to succeed him with a decisive majority amongst a highly divided field.

Beame also swept all five boroughs, breaking 60% of the vote in Brooklyn, winning majorities in Queens and the Bronx, and winning with pluralities in Manhattan and Staten Island. Beame's closest competitor was state senator John Marchi, who received 16.07% of the vote running on the Republican and Integrity lines. This was the first election since 1953 in which the winning candidate did not run on the Liberal Party ticket.

== Liberal primary ==
=== Candidates ===
- Albert Blumenthal, Assemblyman from the West Side (also running as Democrat)
- J. Stanley Shaw, bankruptcy attorney and Queens party leader

==== Declined ====
- John V. Lindsay, incumbent mayor since 1966
- Robert F. Wagner Jr., former mayor from 1954 to 1966

== Democratic primary ==
=== Background ===
After Mario Procaccino won the 1969 Democratic primary with only 33 percent of the vote as the only conservative in the field, primaries were reformed to require at least 40 percent to win outright. If no candidate received more than 40 percent, the race would proceed to a run-off election between the top two vote-getters.

=== Candidates ===
- Herman Badillo, U.S. Representative from the Bronx
- Abraham Beame, City Comptroller and nominee for mayor in 1965
- Mario Biaggi, U.S. Representative from the Bronx (also running as Conservative)
- Albert Blumenthal, Assemblyman from the West Side (also running as Liberal)

==== Withdrew ====
- Sanford Garelik, President of the New York City Council (ran for re-election)
- Jesse Gray, Assemblyman from Harlem
- Jerome Kretchmer, New York City Environmental Protection Administrator and former Assemblyman from the Upper West Side

=== Results ===
1973 Democratic mayoral primary
Party	Candidate	Votes	%
Democratic	Abraham Beame	270,421	34.53%
Democratic	Herman Badillo	228,019	29.12%
Democratic	Mario Biaggi	160,787	20.53%
Democratic	Albert H. Blumenthal	123,906	15.82%
Total votes		783,133	100.00%

==== By borough ====
1973 Democratic initial primary	Manhattan	The Bronx	Brooklyn	Queens	Richmond [Staten Is.]	Total	%
Abraham Beame	46,519	42,537	98,121	74,223	9,021	270,421	34%
Abraham Beame	26%	27%	41%	40%	42%	270,421	34%
Herman Badillo	74,496	57,258	58,546	34,742	2,977	228,019	29%
Herman Badillo	41%	36%	25%	19%	14%	228,019	29%
Albert H. Blumenthal	41,794	18,713	32,412	29,173	1,814	123,906	16%
Albert H. Blumenthal	23%	12%	14%	16%	8%	123,906	16%
Mario Biaggi	18,218	39,893	48,952	45,949	7,775	160,787	21%
Mario Biaggi	10%	25%	21%	25%	36%	160,787	21%
							[100%]

=== Runoff results ===
1973 Democratic mayoral primary
Party	Candidate	Votes	%
Democratic	Abraham Beame	547,626	60.81%
Democratic	Herman Badillo	352,912	39.19%
Total votes		900,538	100.00%

==== By borough ====
1973 Democratic run-off primary	Manhattan	The Bronx	Brooklyn	Queens	Richmond [Staten Is.]	Total	%
Abraham Beame	78,760	96,590	200,945	153,377	17,844	547,626	60.8%
Abraham Beame	41%	53%	69%	73%	79%	547,626	60.8%
Herman Badillo	113,738	85,827	91,628	56,933	4,796	352,912	39.2%
Herman Badillo	59%	47%	32%	27%	21%	352,912	39.2%
T O T A L	192,598	182,417	292,573	210,310	22,640	900.538	

== Republican primary ==
=== Candidates ===
- Sanford Garelik, President of the New York City Council
- John J. Marchi, state senator from Staten Island and nominee in 1969

== General election ==
=== Candidates ===
- Abraham Beame, incumbent comptroller since 1970 (Democratic and Civil Service & Fusion)
- Mario Biaggi, U.S. Representative from the Bronx (Conservative and Safe City)
- Albert Blumenthal, Assemblymember from the West Side (Liberal and Good Government)
- Anton Chaiken (Labor)
- John Emanuel (Socialist Labor)
- John Marchi, state senator from Staten Island (Republican and Integrity)
- Norman Oliver (Socialist Workers)
- Rasheed Storey (Communist)
- Frank Youngstein (Free Libertarian)

=== Results ===
1973 New York City mayoral election
Party	Candidate	Votes	%	±%
Democratic	Abraham Beame	896,265	52.55%	▲20.15
Civil Service & Fusion	Abraham Beame	67,277	3.94%	▲1.55
Total	Abraham Beame	963,542	56.49%	▲21.70
Republican	John J. Marchi	259,781	15.23%	▲1.15
Integrity	John J. Marchi	14,271	0.84%	N/A
Total	John J. Marchi	274,052	16.07%	▼6.62
Liberal	Albert H. Blumenthal	233,265	13.68%	▼22.82
Good Government	Albert H. Blumenthal	29,335	1.72%	N/A
Total	Albert H. Blumenthal	262,600	15.40%	N/A
Conservative	Mario Biaggi	178,967	10.49%	▲1.58
Safe City	Mario Biaggi	8,010	0.47%	N/A
Total	Mario Biaggi	186,977	10.96%	N/A
Libertarian	Fran Youngstein	8,818	0.52%	N/A
Communist	Rasheed Storey	3,601	0.21%	▲0.04
Socialist Workers	Norman Oliver	2,282	0.13%	N/A
U.S. Labor	Anton Chaiken	2,000	0.12%	N/A
Socialist Labor	John Emanuel	1,762	0.10%	N/A
Total votes		1,705,634	100.00%	

==== By borough ====
1973 General Election	party	Manhattan	The Bronx	Brooklyn	Queens	Richmond [Staten Is.]	Total	%
Abraham Beame	Democratic - Civil Service & Fusion	159,531	161,156	322,141	283,145	37,569	963,542	56.5%
Abraham Beame	Democratic - Civil Service & Fusion	49.8%	57.3%	63.6%	56.7%	47.1%	963,542	56.5%
John Marchi	Republican -Integrity	44,200	37,287	73,328	90,860	28,377	274,052	16.1%
John Marchi	Republican -Integrity	13.8%	13.3%	14.5%	18.2%	35.6%	274,052	16.1%
Albert H. Blumenthal	Liberal - Good Government	99,816	32,305	59,417	66,056	5,006	262,600	15.4%
Albert H. Blumenthal	Liberal - Good Government	31.2%	11.5%	11.7%	13.2%	6.3%	262,600	15.4%
Mario Biaggi	Conservative - Safe City	16,662	50,440	51,391	59,691	8,793	186,977	11.0%
Mario Biaggi	Conservative - Safe City	5.2%	17.9%	10.2%	11.9%	11.0%	186,977	11.0%
subtotal		320,209	281,188	506,277	499,752	79,745	1,687,171	98.9
others							18,463	1.1%
T O T A L							1,705,634	
