= Mario Biaggi =

American politician (1917–2015)

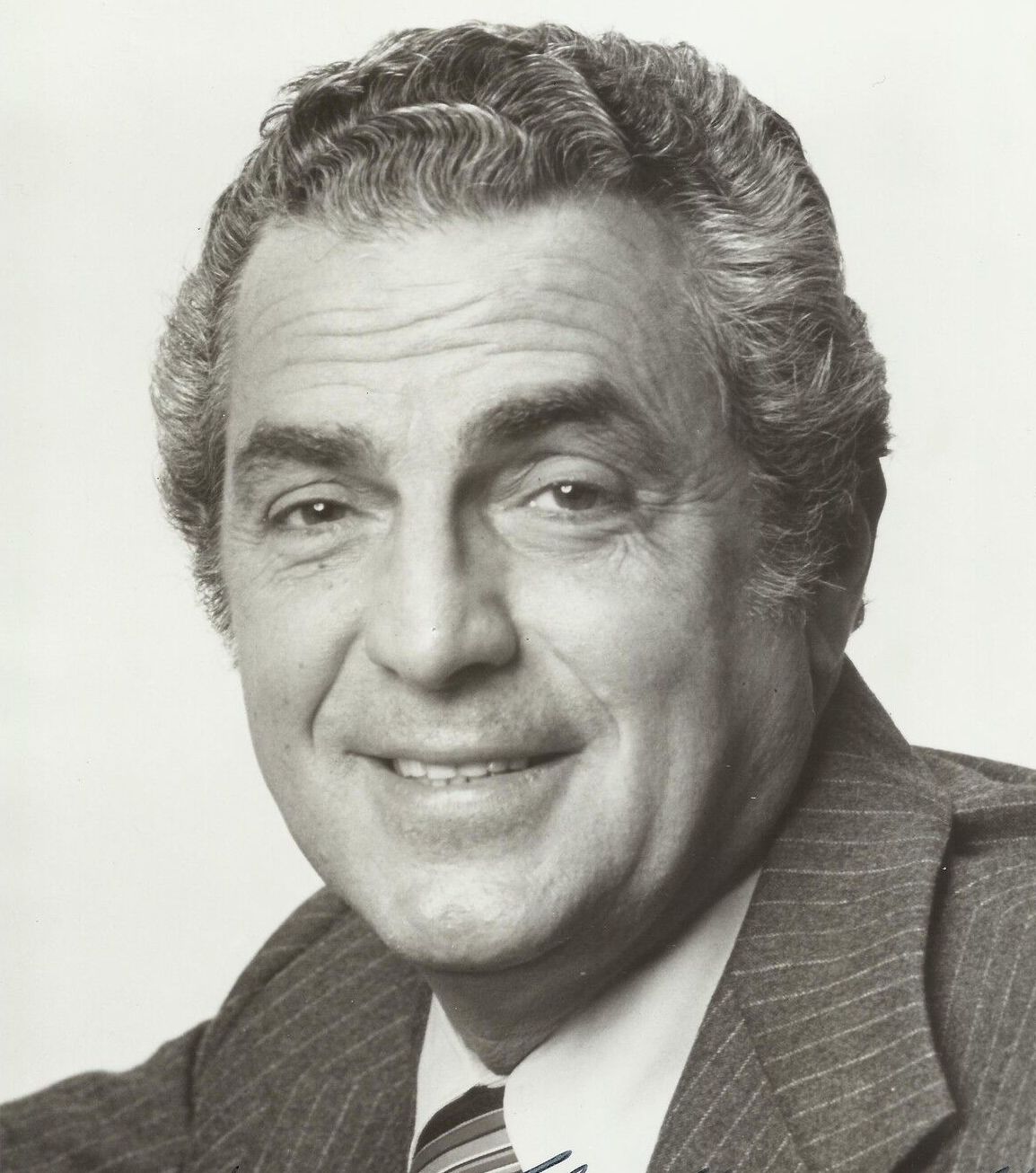
- Official portrait, 1978

Member of the U.S. House of Representatives from New York
- In office January 3, 1969 – August 5, 1988
- Preceded by: Paul A. Fino
- Succeeded by: Eliot Engel
- Constituency: 24th district (1969–1973); 10th district (1973–1983); 19th district (1983–1988)

Personal details
- Born: October 26, 1917 New York City, U.S.
- Died: June 24, 2015 (aged 97) New York City, U.S.
- Resting place: Gate of Heaven Cemetery
- Party: Democratic
- Other political affiliations: Conservative (1973)
- Spouse: Marie Wassil (m. 1940; died 1997)
- Children: 4
- Relatives: Alessandra Biaggi (granddaughter)
- Education: New York Law School (LLB)

Mario Biaggi (October 26, 1917 – June 24, 2015) was an American politician, attorney, and police officer. He served ten terms as a member of the United States House of Representatives from New York from 1969 to 1988.

Prior to his political career, Biaggi became one of the most decorated officers in NYPD history; he killed two criminals who attacked him and was injured 11 times as an officer. He then became an attorney at 49 years of age. First elected a U.S. Representative as a Democrat from the Bronx in 1968, Biaggi was subsequently re-elected nine times, seven times with more than 90% of the vote.

In 1987 and 1988, he was convicted in two trials of receipt of unlawful gratuities, and, facing the prospect of expulsion from the House, he resigned from Congress in August of 1988.

== Early life ==
Biaggi was born in a tenement on East 106th Street in East Harlem in Upper Manhattan, New York City, New York to poor Italian immigrants from Piacenza in Northern Italy. His father, Salvatore Biaggi, was a marble setter. His mother, Mary (née Campari), worked as a charwoman. He had two younger brothers.

Biaggi graduated from P.S. 171 in East Harlem. Subsequently, in 1934 during the height of the Depression, he graduated from Haaren High School in Manhattan. In 1940 he married Marie Wassil (who died in 1997), and they moved to the Bronx and had two daughters, Barbara and Jacqueline, and two sons, Richard and Mario Jr.

== Early career ==
=== Mailman ===
After working as a shoeshine boy and a stint as a factory worker, at age 18, Biaggi became a substitute letter carrier for the United States Postal Service, for 65 cents per hour. Later, he became a regular letter carrier; his mail route included the home of one of his heroes, New York City Mayor Fiorello La Guardia. He served nearly six years with the Post Office and became an activist in Branch 36 of the National Association of Letter Carriers.

=== New York City Police Department ===
In 1942, Biaggi joined the New York City Police Department (NYPD), at 25 years of age. He wanted to join the US Army, but police were exempted from the US military at the time, and the fact that his two brothers were in the armed forces was an additional factor. His police career spanned 23 years, until 1965.

He was wounded 11 times. Biaggi received dozens of citations for valor, including the police department’s Medal of Honor (its highest award) and the National Police Officers Association of America’s Medal of Valor, becoming one of the NYPD's most decorated officers. Among his many exploits was his rescue in 1946 on Amsterdam Avenue in Manhattan of a girl on a runaway horse, which dragged him 90 feet and trampled his right leg before he subdued it, causing a permanent limp. He used a cane for the rest of his life. In 1944, he shot and killed a man who tried to stab him with an ice pick, and in 1959, he shot and killed a man who tried to rob him at gunpoint; he himself was wounded in the shootout in the Bronx.

In 1952, he was promoted to Sergeant. He retired from the Department in 1965, with the rank of Detective Lieutenant.

=== Legal career ===
At the age of 45 and near the end of his police career, Biaggi entered law school. The American Bar Association granted him a special dispensation to study law due to his distinguished police career, even though Biaggi had never gone to college and a college degree was a prerequisite. Dean Daniel Gutman offered him a full scholarship to New York Law School, after hearing him speak at a public event. In 1965, he graduated from the law school with an LL.B. In 1966, at the age of 49, he was admitted to the New York State Bar and founded with Bernard G. Ehrlich the Bronx law firm Biaggi & Ehrlich. He represented a Queens woman who was denied the right to be an umpire in minor league baseball in 1969, and won her case at the New York Court of Appeals in 1972.

== U.S. House of Representatives ==
=== Campaigns ===
In 1968, the U.S. House seat in New York's 24th congressional district became vacant when eight-term Republican incumbent Paul A. Fino resigned to become a justice on the New York Supreme Court. Biaggi ran for the open seat as a Democrat with the endorsement of the Conservative Party. He won the 1968 election to Congress with 60.5% of the vote in what had previously been considered a traditional Bronx Republican stronghold. He was 51 years old.

Author Gerhard Falk wrote: "Few members of the House of Representatives have ever achieved the popularity of Mario Biaggi." He was easily re-elected in 1970, as a nominee of the Democratic, Republican, and Conservative Parties, with a vote of 130,000-8,000. He won the 1970 election defeating former Bronx Borough President Joseph F. Periconi, the 1972 election with 93.9% of the vote, the 1974 election with 82.4% of the vote, the 1976 election with 91.6% of the vote, the 1978 election with 95.0% of the vote, the 1980 election with 94.5% of the vote, the 1982 election with 93.7% of the vote, the 1984 election with 94.8% of the vote, and the 1986 election with 90.2% of the vote.

In the redistricting after the 1970 United States census, Biaggi's district was renumbered the 10th, and included part of Queens. In the redistricting after the 1980 census, his district was renumbered the 19th, and included part of suburban Westchester County. From 1972 onward, he was nominated by the Republicans as well. In 1968, 1970, and 1972 he also received the Conservative nomination. From 1978 onward he got the Liberal nomination.

=== Tenure ===
Biaggi was known as a law-and-order Democrat, socially conservative, economically progressive, and tough on street crime, and led the institution of a federal ban on armor-piercing "cop killer" teflon-coated bullets, a major concern of police. He also strongly supported the elderly, labor unions, the mentally disabled, hand-gun control, Israel, Soviet Jewry, and peace in Northern Ireland, and opposed brutality in US Army camps and antisemitism. Commenting in 1973 during the Yom Kippur War, Biaggi said: "Israel was attacked in very much the same fashion that Pearl Harbor was attacked."

He was noted for being "a service congressman." John C. Dearie, a former New York State Assemblyman, recalled: "He would do it for the son who needed to get his mother a bed in a nursing home, or the family who needed to resolve a Social Security problem, or the kid who needed help getting a job application at the Parks Department. He would pick up and make the phone call, and when he did, it was like God himself was making the call."

During his tenure in office he was Chairman of the United States House Committee on Merchant Marine and Fisheries Subcommittee on Coast Guard and Navigation, Chairman of the United States House Permanent Select Committee on Aging Subcommittee on Human Services, and Chairman of the 120-member bi-partisan Ad Hoc Congressional Committee for Irish Affairs.

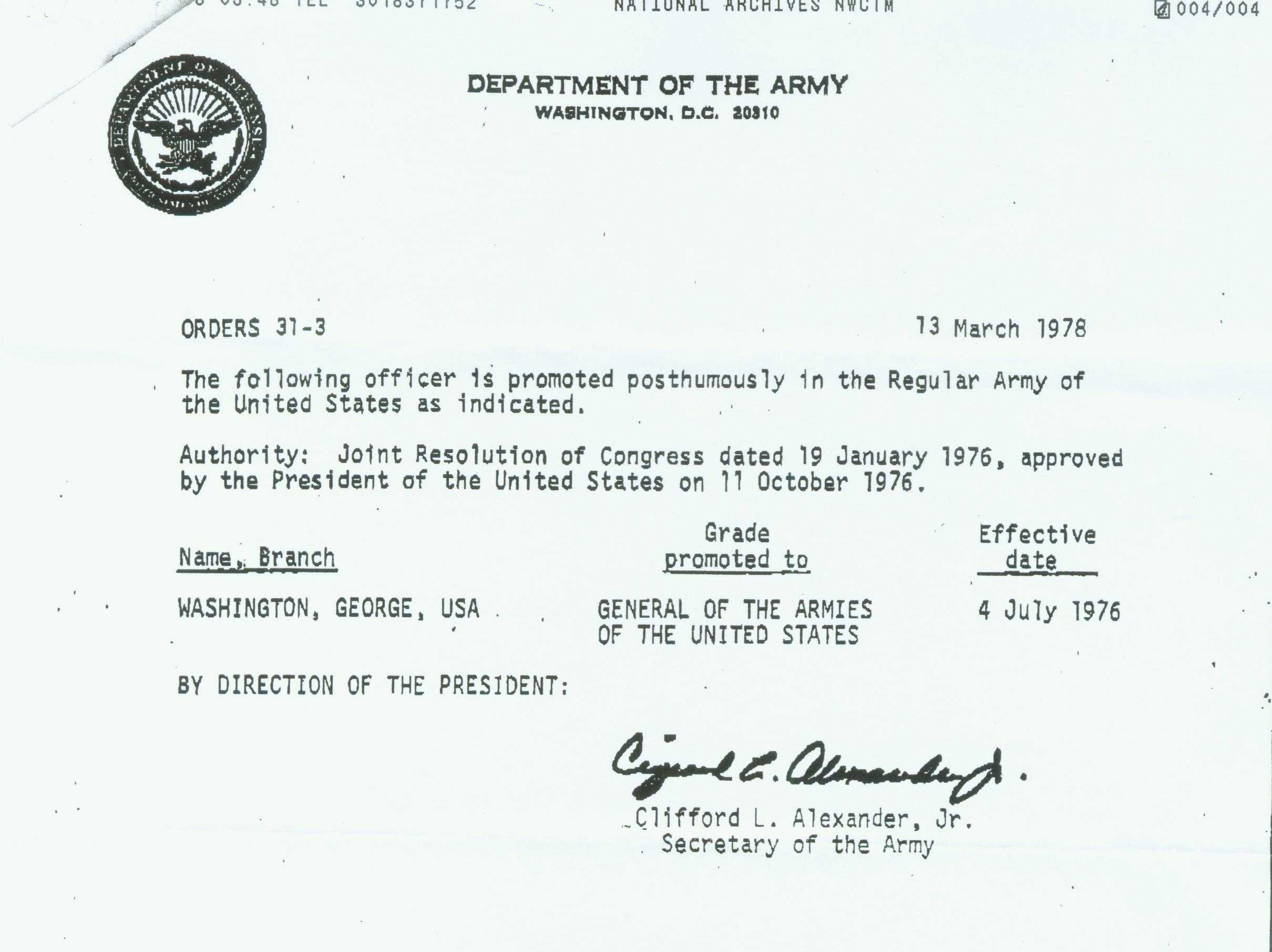
Department of the Army Order 31-3

In 1975, Biaggi introduced a joint resolution of Congress, Public Law 94-479, to posthumously promote George Washington to the grade of General of the Armies of the United States and restore Washington's position as the highest-ranking military officer in U.S. history. It was passed and was approved by President Gerald Ford in 1976, and formalized in Department of the Army Order 31-3 in 1978, with an effective appointment date of July 4, 1976, the United States Bicentennial.

Biaggi established the National Law Enforcement Officers Memorial Fund (NLEOMF). It sponsored the National Law Enforcement Officers Memorial in Washington, D.C. at Judiciary Square, authorized in 1984, which honors 21,183 U.S. law enforcement officers who have died in the line of duty throughout American history.

=== 1973 mayoral campaign ===
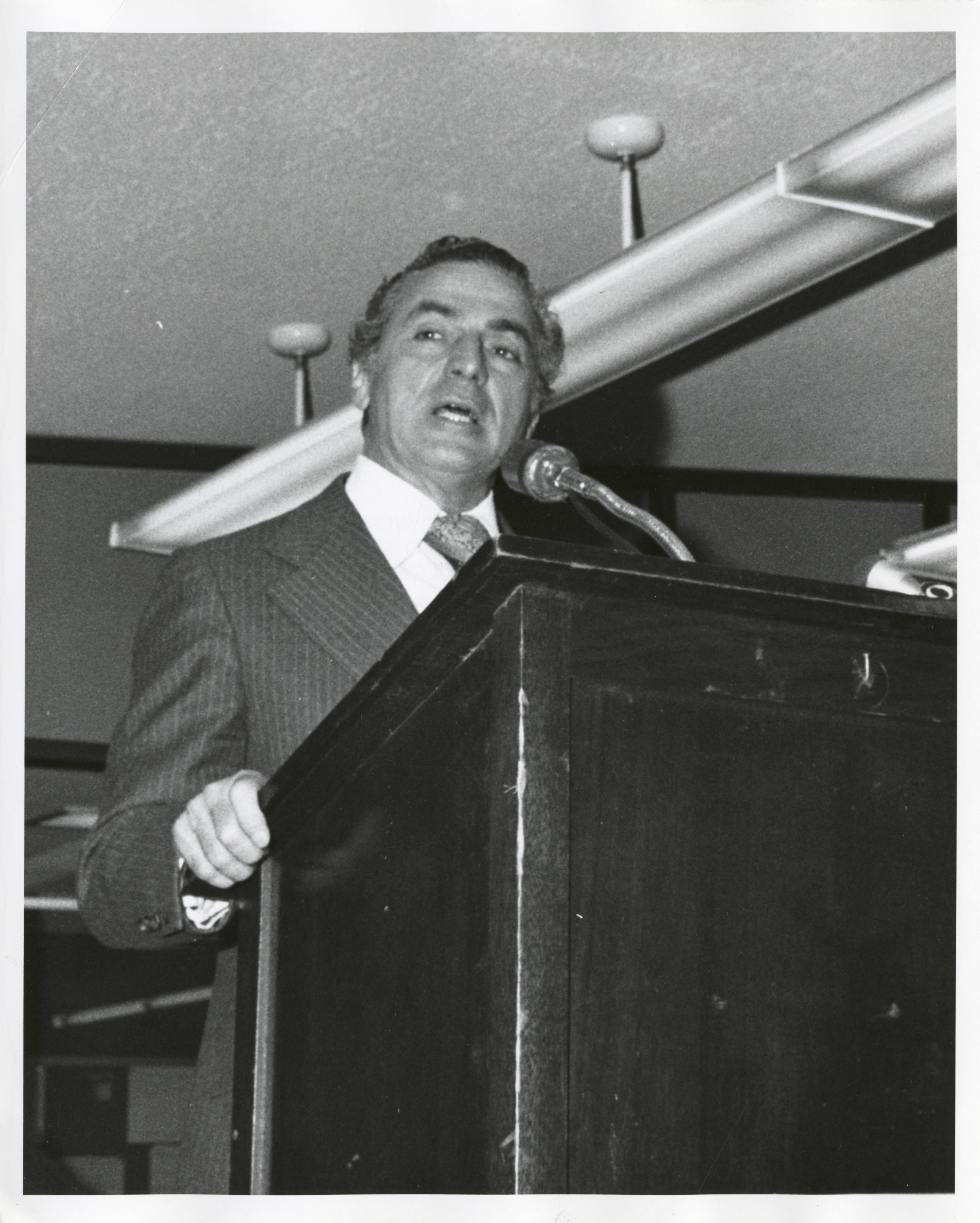
Mario Biaggi, 1973

In 1973, Biaggi declared his candidacy for Mayor of New York City. He entered the Democratic primary. Biaggi was a fairly conservative Democrat by New York City standards, and had run on the Conservative line for Congress three times. Conservative Party leaders supported him as the party's candidate for mayor, and planned to make him their nominee regardless of whether he received the Democratic line. Initially, he was ahead in the polls. Biaggi lost the Democratic primary in June, coming in third with 21% of the vote behind Abe Beame (34%) and Herman Badillo (29%), and ahead of Albert H. Blumenthal (16%).

After Biaggi did not win the Democratic primary, while he remained on the Conservative line in the general election, he gave assurances to Democratic county chairmen in late August 1973 that he would not make a "serious run" for Mayor and thereby pull votes away from Democratic nominee Beame, even though he would remain as the Conservative Party nominee inasmuch as New York law did not allow him to withdraw at that stage. He finished in fourth place, behind Beame, John Marchi, and Blumenthal, with 11% of the vote, as Beame won the election.

=== Unlawful gratuity convictions ===
In 1987 Biaggi was charged with taking an unlawful gratuity. He had accepted payment from his long-time friend former Brooklyn Democratic leader Meade Esposito of a $3,200 spa bill for Biaggi and his companion as he vacationed in Florida in December 1984. Prosecutors said it was in exchange for using his influence to help a ship-repair company that was a major client of Esposito's insurance agency. The defense said it was given by Esposito out of friendship, and no favors were done by Biaggi in return. The judge explained that to convict Biaggi of bribery, the jury would have to find that Biaggi accepted something of value with the understanding it was in exchange for Biaggi's influence on official actions. He said that in contrast an unlawful gratuity is like a tip given for services performed or expected to be performed, but requires no quid pro quo understanding.

Biaggi was acquitted of both bribery and conspiracy in the three-week trial. He was, however, convicted of accepting an illegal gratuity and obstruction of justice, sentenced to two-and-a-half years in prison, and fined $500,000. Esposito received a suspended sentence. Judge Jack B. Weinstein said, as he sentenced Biaggi: "If ever there was a Greek tragedy, it is this one. A hero is today struck low, and grief descends." Biaggi maintained his innocence. The House Ethics Committee recommended that Biaggi be expelled, the most severe penalty.

Separately, in 1988 Biaggi and Ehrlich were charged by US Attorney Rudy Giuliani in the Wedtech scandal with having accepted bribes for assisting the Wedtech Corporation in obtaining federal procurement contracts. The core of the prosecution's case was built around the testimony of four former Wedtech executives who negotiated cooperation agreements with the government, that allowed the executives to plead guilty to lesser charges in exchange for their cooperation. Among those bribed was Vito J. Castellano, Ehrlich's military colleague and the Adjutant General of New York. Biaggi was convicted of 15 counts of obstruction of justice and accepting illegal gratuities. Prior to his sentencing, dozens of House members wrote letters to the sentencing judge attesting to Biaggi's character and past contributions. He was sentenced to eight years in federal prison. He continued to maintain his innocence. Three other defendants in the Wedtech scandal who were also indicted by Giuliani, and also initially convicted of receiving illegal payments, had their convictions overturned in 1991 by the US Court of Appeals for the Second Circuit, which held that prosecutors "should have been aware" that a crucial Wedtech executive witness in the Wedtech case lied; the witness had also testified against Biaggi in his trial, in exchange for being allowed to plead guilty to a lesser charge.

=== Resignation and aftermath ===
Facing expulsion from the House, Biaggi resigned his seat on August 5, 1988. He was at the time 70 years old, and the senior Congressman in the New York City delegation.

Since primary election petitions were already filed, Biaggi remained on the ballot for the 1988 Democratic and Republican primaries in the 19th District, though he said that he would neither campaign nor run. He sought to be removed from the ballot, but a New York court held that there was no legal means to effect his removal. Biaggi did not campaign, and lost the Democratic primary to then-State Assemblyman Eliot Engel. At the time, the 19th District was one of the more conservative districts in New York City. Biaggi was nominated by the Republican Party. In the general election, Engel won with 56% of the vote to Biaggi's 44%. To date, this is the last time that a candidate running on the Republican line has crossed the 40% mark in the district.

In Robert Friedman's biography of Meir Kahane, the leader of the Jewish Defense League, Kahane states that Biaggi marched with both himself and New York City mafia boss Joseph Colombo in 1971. Friedman also states that Biaggi received a "medal of honor" from Kahane at a Kach dinner that took place at the Lincoln Square Synagogue in February 1988.

=== Prison ===
On April 10, 1989, Biaggi began serving his prison sentence at Fort Worth.

== Later life ==
Biaggi was released in 1991 when he was 73 years old, after 26 months in prison, by the sentencing judge on the grounds of ill health (heart problems, arthritis, nerve damage in his legs, and broken bones from four falls in prison). He would have been eligible for parole six months later.

=== Comeback attempt ===
In 1992, at 74 years of age, Biaggi attempted a political comeback. He sought his old seat in Congress, challenging his successor, Engel, in the Democratic primary. The last Congressman to be re-elected after serving time for a felony was Matthew Lyon of Vermont, who ran from jail in 1798 and won. Biaggi was endorsed by the Patrolmen's Benevolent Association and eight other police and firefighter unions. He said that many of his former constituents asked him to run, and that Engel had a poor record on constituent service. Despite the enthusiasm of some of his supporters, Biaggi raised little money. Engel, who raised more money and cited Biaggi's criminal convictions, won easily. After the election, the Bronx News reported that some of Biaggi's former constituents wanted to vote for him but could not. In the redistricting after the 1990 census, parts of Biaggi's old district that had been his strongholds, Throggs Neck and Morris Park, had been shifted to other districts.

=== Request for pardon ===
As the presidency of Bill Clinton closed, Biaggi requested a pardon for his federal convictions. When asked for comment, the United States Attorneys Offices for the Eastern and Southern District of New York each opposed pardon for any convictions, noting that Biaggi received a humanitarian release and had failed to pay his fines. No pardon was issued.

== Death and burial ==
Biaggi died at his home in Riverdale in the Bronx on June 24, 2015, at the age of 97. He is buried in the Gate of Heaven Cemetery in Hawthorne, New York.

=== Relatives ===
In their obituary, the New York Times noted his survivors as two daughters, two sons, eleven grandchildren, and four great-grandchildren. From 2019 to 2022, Biaggi's granddaughter, Alessandra Biaggi, was a member of the New York State Senate.

== Accolades ==
In 1961, Biaggi became the first police officer in New York State to be made a member of the National Police Officers Hall of Fame. In 1976, he was inducted into the National Italian American Hall of Fame. In 2000, he was inducted into the National Safe Boating Council’s Boating Safety Hall of Fame.

Biaggi received the New York City Police Department's Medal of Honor (1960), the Order of the Star of Italian Solidarity from Italy (1961), the National Law Officers Distinguished Service Award (1968), the Columbian Lawyers Association Rapallo Award (1972), the Jewish Identity Center Award for Dedicated Efforts on Behalf of Jewish Causes (1978), the National Association of State Boating Law Administrators (NASBLA) Bonner Award (1978), the Order of the Pike Award, the Ancient Order of Hibernians (1980), and the August A. Busch, III Award (1981). He was nominated for a Nobel Peace Prize (1982; for trying to halt the violence in Northern Ireland), and received the American Merchant Marine Achievement Award (1983), the United Seamen's Service Admiral of the Ocean Sea Award (1983), the National Law Enforcement Officers Memorial Fund's Distinguished Service Award (1998), the Grand Council of United Emerald Societies Presidents Award (2001), the NYPD Shomrim Society Otto Raphael Award (2005), and the Ancient Order of Hibernians Friend of the Irish Award (2011).

Fordham University conferred an honorary Doctor of Laws degree on Biaggi in 1984, for being "widely respected as a Representative of unparalleled responsiveness to his constituents even in the smallest personal matter", and New York Law School held the Inaugural Mario Biaggi Lecture in 1985.

U.S. House of Representatives
Preceded by Paul A. Fino	Member of the U.S. House of Representatives from New York's 24th congressional district 1969–1973	Succeeded by Ogden Reid
Preceded by Emanuel Celler	Member of the U.S. House of Representatives from New York's 10th congressional district 1973–1983	Succeeded by Chuck Schumer
Preceded by Charles Rangel	Member of the U.S. House of Representatives from New York's 19th congressional district 1983–1988	Succeeded by Eliot Engel
Party political offices
Preceded by John Marchi	Conservative nominee for Mayor of New York City; 1973	Succeeded by Barry Farber
