= Irish National Caucus =

The Irish National Caucus (INC) is an Irish-American lobby group. It was founded by Father Sean Gabriel McManus on February 6, 1974, at a meeting of the Ancient Order of Hibernians. The lobby group was formed to counterbalance British influences in the United States Congress and government, at a time when Northern Ireland was engulfed in violence. The situation was complicated, as Britain and the USA were allied in NATO during the Cold War against the Soviet Union, which collaborated with some Irish republican elements.

In the 1976 presidential race, Democratic challenger Jimmy Carter approached the INC in an effort to attract votes from a group, stating his belief that "it is a mistake for our country's government to stand quiet on the struggle of the Irish for peace, for the respect of human rights, and for unifying Ireland." On election, Carter did take a stronger position in the conflict.

One of the INC's main activities is lobbying for the MacBride Principles, a manifesto promulgated by the Caucus and written by its founder, Father McManus. The manifesto demands the cooperation of US companies doing business in Northern Ireland in fighting alleged discrimination and abuses there.

== Related organizations ==
The Irish National Caucus also operated a registered political action committee under the name INC Irish PAC, also coordinated by Father McManus. The PAC is currently defunct; its last Federal Election Commission filings were in 2002. The PAC was relatively minor, drawing only a couple of major donors.

In September 1997, the INC formed a tax-exempt charitable organization, the Irish Peace Foundation, to support "a non-violent solution in Ireland."

The group was thought in the 1980s by the Irish and British Governments to be linked to NORAID, which was in turn thought to be the American front organisation of the Provisional IRA.

== Endorsements ==
In the 2000 New York Senate race, INC leader Father McManus and the INC PAC endorsed then-First Lady Hillary Clinton, drawing a rebuke from New York Cardinal John O'Connor for supporting a pro-choice candidate. McManus explained that the PAC supported candidates solely based on their support for Northern Ireland (i.e., against the existence of Northern Ireland), not their other positions.
