= Abraham Beame =

Mayor of New York City from 1974 to 1977

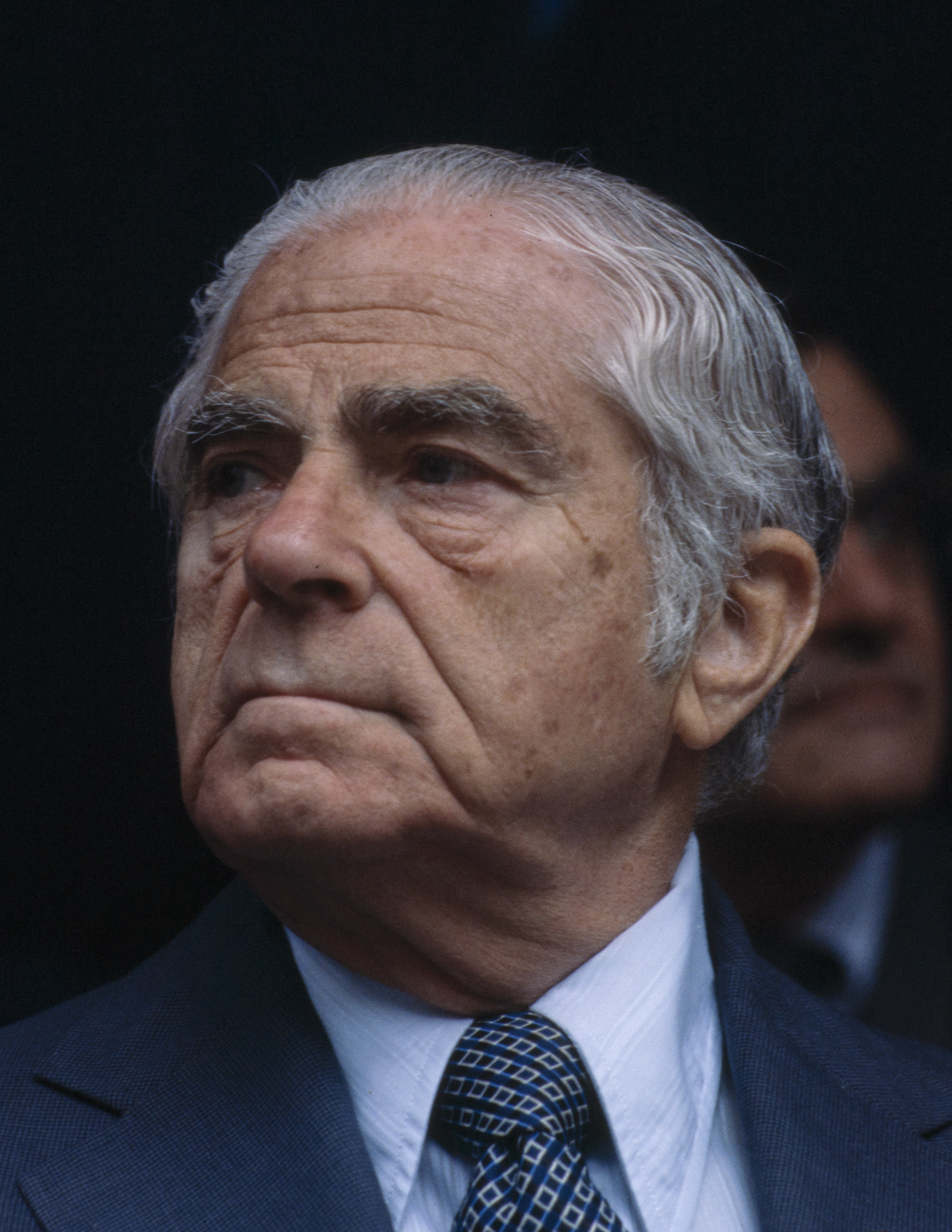
- Beame in 1974

105th Mayor of New York City
- In office January 1, 1974 – December 31, 1977
- Preceded by: John Lindsay
- Succeeded by: Ed Koch

36th and 38th New York City Comptroller
- In office January 1, 1970 – December 31, 1973
- Mayor: John Lindsay
- Preceded by: Mario Procaccino
- Succeeded by: Harrison J. Goldin
- In office January 1, 1962 – December 31, 1965
- Mayor: Robert F. Wagner, Jr.
- Preceded by: Lawrence E. Gerosa
- Succeeded by: Mario Procaccino

Personal details
- Born: Abraham David Birnbaum; March 20, 1906 London, England
- Died: February 10, 2001 (aged 94) New York City, U.S.
- Resting place: New Montefiore Cemetery
- Party: Democratic
- Spouse: Mary Ingerman (m. 1928; died 1995)
- Children: 2
- Relatives: Marty Ingels (nephew)
- Education: Baruch College (degree originally conferred by the City College of New York)
- Profession: Accountant

Abraham David Beame (né Birnbaum; March 20, 1906 – February 10, 2001) was an English-born American accountant, investor, and Democratic Party politician who served from 1974 to 1977 as the 105th mayor of New York City. Beame presided over the city during the 1975 New York City fiscal crisis, when the city was almost forced to declare bankruptcy.

== Early life ==
Beame was born Abraham David Birnbaum in London. His parents were Esther (née Goldfarb) and Philip Birnbaum, Jewish immigrants from Poland who fled Warsaw (then part of the Russian Empire). Beame and his family left England when he was three months old. He was raised on New York City's Lower East Side.

Beame graduated from P.S. 160 and the High School of Commerce before enrolling at the City College of New York's School of Business and Civic Administration (spun off as Baruch College in 1968), where he received his undergraduate degree in business with honors in 1928.

== Career ==
=== Career before politics ===
While in college, Beame co-founded an accounting firm, Beame & Greidinger. He was an accounting teacher at Richmond Hill High School in Queens from 1929 to 1946 and also taught accounting and commercial law at Rutgers University from 1944 to 1945.

From 1952 to 1961, Beame served as New York City's director of the budget, having also served as assistant director from 1946 to 1952. In this capacity, he "negotiated all city labor contracts without a strike and kept books on city spending and borrowing; he also set up management programs that saved the city $40 million."

=== Early political career ===
Beame was a "clubhouse" or machine politician, a product of the Brooklyn wing of the patronage-oriented "regular" Democratic organization, the borough's equivalent of Manhattan's Tammany Hall and the locus of New York patronage politics following the ascent of Meade Esposito, as opposed to the policy-oriented "reform" Democrats who entered New York City politics, most effectively in Manhattan and the Bronx in the 1950s.

Before being elected to two nonconsecutive terms as city comptroller in 1961 and 1969, he was a longstanding member of Crown Heights's influential Madison Democratic Club and served as political boss Irwin Steingut's personal accountant. Members of the Madison Club, including attorney/fundraiser Abraham "Bunny" Lindenbaum and Steingut's son, Stanley, frequently liaised with real estate developer Fred Trump. The club also played a decisive role in the political ascent of Park Slope–based attorney Hugh Carey, whose tenure as governor of New York coincided with Beame's administration, though Carey eventually broke with the organization by endorsing Mario Cuomo's 1977 primary bid to unseat Beame.

In 1965, Beame was the Democratic nominee for mayor of New York City. Edward N. Costikyan was his campaign manager and James Farley his campaign chair. Despite having Senator Robert F. Kennedy's strong support, Beame lost to the Republican nominee, John Lindsay.

== Mayor of New York City ==
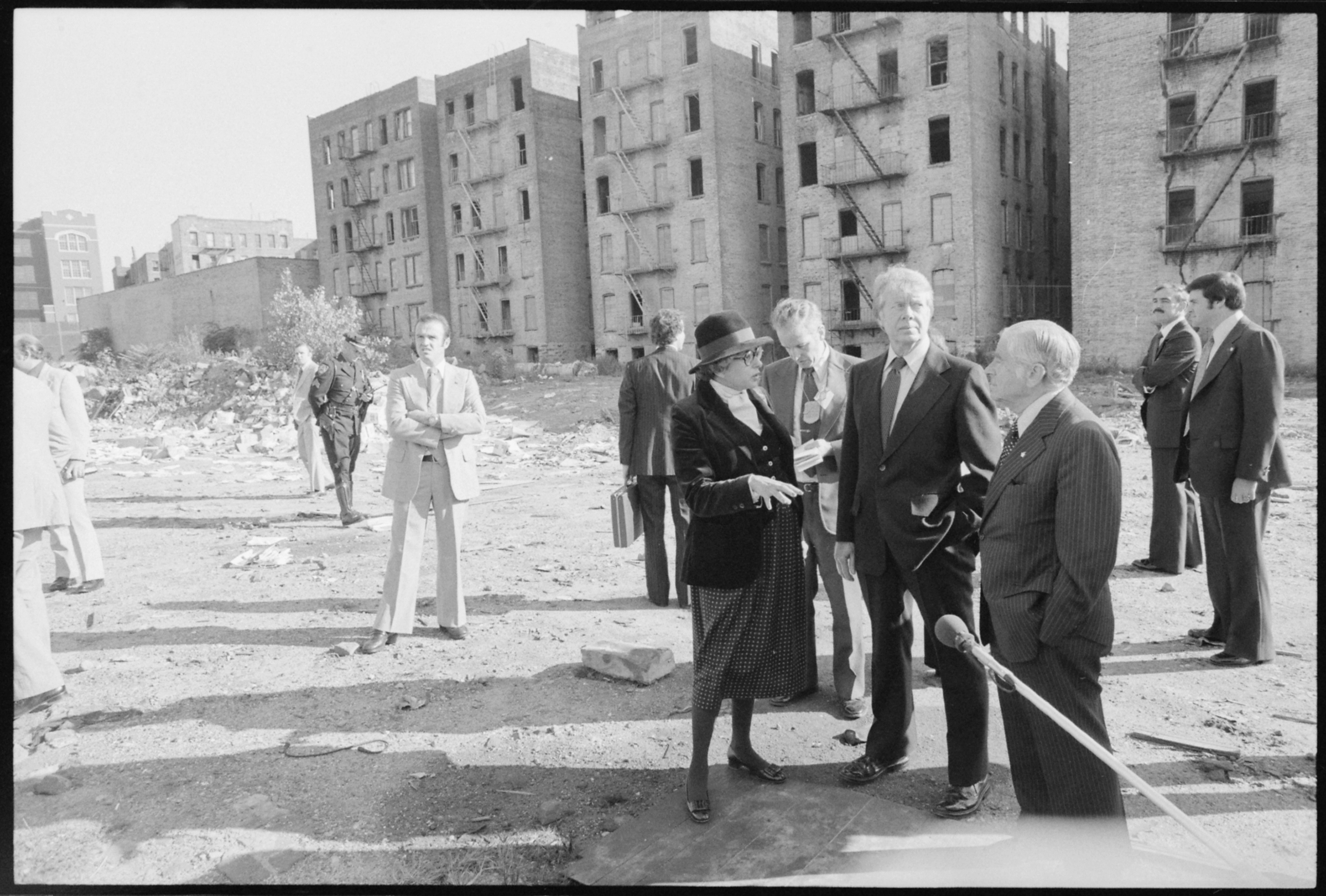
Beame tours the South Bronx with President Jimmy Carter and HUD Secretary Patricia Roberts Harris in 1977

Beame won the 1973 Democratic mayoral primary with 34% of the vote, ahead of Herman Badillo (29%), Mario Biaggi (24%), and Albert H. Blumenthal (16%). He defeated State Senator John J. Marchi, Blumenthal, and Biaggi in the 1973 mayoral election, becoming the 105th mayor of New York City. Beame is usually considered the city's first Jewish mayor. (Note: Some consider Fiorello LaGuardia New York City's first Jewish mayor. LaGuardia practiced Episcopalianism, but his mother was a non-practicing Jew, making him Jewish according to Jewish law (Halakha).)

=== Fiscal crisis of 1975 ===
Beame entered office facing the worst fiscal crisis in the city's history and spent most of his term attempting to ward off bankruptcy. Soon after being sworn in as mayor, Beame slashed the city workforce, froze salaries, and reconfigured the budget, which proved unsatisfactory until reinforced by actions from newly created state-sponsored entities and the granting of federal funds.

In October 1975, the city of New York was in debt of $453 million. Beame made a statement on October 17 that the city had insufficient cash on hand to meet its debt obligations for that day. He added that New York City citizens needed to take immediate steps to protect the city's essential life support systems and to preserve their well-being. President Gerald Ford at first turned down New York's request for a loan, inspiring the legendary Daily News headline "Ford to City: Drop Dead", but Ford later approved federal support for New York.

=== Blackout of 1977 ===
On the evening of July 13, 1977, a massive power failure hit the city. With temperatures in the mid-nineties Fahrenheit and the humidity high, New Yorkers sweltered. By the time power was restored at 10:39 p.m. the next night, the city had been without power for 25 hours. Beame set up a Blackout Action Center at the New York City Police Department headquarters. The blackout resulted in raw sewage washing up on beaches and spoiled food in hundreds or thousands of restaurants around the city.

After a chaotic four years as mayor, Beame ran for a second term in 1977, and finished third in the Democratic primary, behind Representative Ed Koch and New York Secretary of State Mario Cuomo, and ahead of former Representative Bella Abzug, Representative Herman Badillo and Manhattan Borough President Percy Sutton. He was succeeded by Koch, who won the general election on November 8, 1977.

When Beame left office on January 1, 1978, the city budget had a surplus of $200 million. There was a $1.5 billion deficit when Beame took office.

A 1993 survey of historians, political scientists and urban experts by Melvin G. Holli of the University of Illinois at Chicago ranked Beame as the 14th-worst American big-city mayor to serve between 1820 and 1993.

=== Later career ===
Beame worked in investment advising after leaving office.

== Personal life ==
Beame was married to his childhood sweetheart, Mary (née Ingerman), for 67 years. They met when Beame was 15, playing checkers at the University Settlement Society of New York. They raised two sons, Edmond and Bernard (Buddy), and lived in Brooklyn, first in Crown Heights and later in a "modest" apartment on Plaza Street West in Park Slope. Throughout his life, Beame summered in the Rockaway neighborhood of Belle Harbor.

Beame received the Townsend Harris medal in 1957, and awards from numerous charitable, religious and civic organizations.

Beame experienced heart problems in his later years. He had heart attacks in 1991 and 2000. After the second, he was admitted to New York University Medical Center, where he remained for the last months of his life. He underwent open-heart surgery in August and December 2000, and died from surgical complications on February 10, 2001, at the age of 94.

== See also ==
- La Guardia and Wagner Archives
- Timeline of New York City#1950s–1970s

== Notes ==
Political offices
Preceded by Lawrence E. Gerosa	New York City Comptroller; 1962–1965	Succeeded by Mario Procaccino
Preceded by Mario Procaccino	New York City Comptroller; 1970–1973	Succeeded by Harrison J. Goldin
Preceded by John Lindsay	Mayor of New York City; 1974–1977	Succeeded by Edward I. Koch
Party political offices
Preceded by Robert F. Wagner, Jr.	Democratic Nominee for Mayor of New York City; 1965	Succeeded by Mario Procaccino
Preceded by Mario Procaccino	Democratic Nominee for Mayor of New York City; 1973	Succeeded by Edward I. Koch
