= Irish Republican Army–Soviet Union collaboration =

Collaboration between the Irish Republican Army and the Soviet Union

During the Irish revolutionary period (1912–1923) and later Soviet Comintern trained Marxist operatives including Betty Sinclair and other Marxists like Michael O'Riordan would play roles in the establishment of Fronts and provocative agitation activities which led to the ignition of The Troubles (late 1960s–1998) in which there were varying degrees of collaboration and contacts between the Soviet Union and the Irish movement.

== Irish revolutionary period ==
During the Irish revolutionary period, the Soviets were supportive of Irish efforts to establish a Republic independent of Britain and was the only state to have relations with the Irish Republic.

During the 1916 Easter Rising, Vladimir Lenin spoke of it positively calling it a decisive "blow against the power of English imperialism". In 1920 Roddy Connolly, the son of the Socialist Republican James Connolly who was executed by firing squad in the aftermath of the Easter Rising visited Lenin in Russia. Lenin informed Connolly that he had read his father’s book "Labour and Irish History" and that he rates him “head and shoulders” above other European socialists.

In 1920, a secret loan deal was reached between the proclaimed Irish Republic and the Soviet Union. Russian crown jewels were given to the Irish Republic in exchange for $20,000, the equivalent of $250,000 today. The jewels were not returned for another three decades. The same year, Patrick McCartan travelled to the Soviet Union, hoping to secure formal recognition of the proclaimed Irish Republic however the Soviets refused as they were hoping to improve Anglo-Soviet relations.

== 1925 and afterwards ==
In 1925, a three man delegation containing Gerald Boland, Pa Murray (the leader) and Seán Russell traveled to the Soviet Union. They went in the hope of receiving financial support and weaponry. Murray had a meeting with Joseph Stalin in which they reached a mutually beneficial agreement. The IRA would spy for the Soviet Union in the neighboring United Kingdom and on the United States. In exchange for their support for the Soviet Union's strategic goals, the IRA would be paid £500 monthly. The agreement was a very closely guarded secret for the Irish, and no explicit written mention of it was made except in code.

Despite this agreement some in the IRA had little regard for the Soviets. Moss Twomey said "these people are so shifty...they are out to exploit us ...Except for our urgent need of cash, I would not be so keen on this [agreement]". Frank Aiken called the Soviets as ‘hopeless bunglers’.

In November 1926, the Soviets decreased payments to the IRA from £500 monthly to only £100 a month. Their cited reasonings were both the low quality of work on the IRA's part and the ongoing financial crisis in the Soviet Union. The IRA had monthly operating costs of £400 a month, so this was a major financial blow to the organization. IRA man Andy Cooney went to London to meet with the Soviet intelligence officer there, but he had little success. Trying to pressure the Soviets for additional funds, IRA volunteers were eventually ordered to withhold the amount of intelligence provided to them. In May 1927, the Soviets handed over £1,000, but they soon ended up severing ties with the IRA altogether.

=== The Troubles ===
The Official IRA had relations with the Soviet Union, and during the Troubles they were supplied by the Soviets. An Irish diplomat in Moscow once wrote that Ireland provided the Soviets with a "convenient stick with which to beat the West."

Assistance from the Soviet Union began in late 1972 when Yuri Andropov, who was then the head of the KGB (later to become General Secretary of the Soviet Union), authorized weapons shipments. On 21 August 1972, Andropov had presented a plan known as SPLASH to the Central Committee of the Communist Party of the Soviet Union. It was entitled "Plan for the Operation of a Shipment of Weapons to the Irish Friends". Two machine guns, 70 automatic rifles, 10 Walther pistols and 41,600 cartridges were sent. The pistols were lubricated with West German oil and the packaging was taken from several countries around the world by KGB agents so that the weapons could not be traced back to the Soviet Union. The weapons were brought to Ireland using the ship known as the Reduktor. Official IRA members also travelled to the Soviet Union for training.
