= Methodist Church in Ireland =

Wesleyan Methodist church in Northern Ireland and the Republic of Ireland

- Classification: Protestant
- Orientation: Methodist
- Theology: Wesleyan
- Polity: Connexional
- Leader: Changes annually
- Associations: World Council of Churches, World Methodist Council, Communion of Protestant Churches in Europe
- Region: Ireland
- Origin: 1784
- Separated from: Church of Ireland
- Separations: Fellowship of Independent Methodist Churches 1973
- Congregations: 232
- Members: approx 50,000 (2018)
- Ministers: 108
- Secondary schools: 2
- Official website: www.irishmethodist.org

The Methodist Church in Ireland (Irish: Eaglais Mheitidisteach in Éirinn) is a Wesleyan Methodist church that operates across both Northern Ireland and the Republic of Ireland on an all-Ireland basis. It is the fourth-largest Christian denomination in Northern Ireland. The Irish Methodist Church has close links with the Methodist Church in Britain.

For the year ending 31 December 2012, there were 105 Methodist ministers, 227 local preachers and over six hundred lay people in leadership positions serving over 200 congregations, which combine to form a total community of 49,394 people. In 2018, the numbers of members and wider community role was approximately 50,000. The governing body of the Methodist Church in Ireland is the annual Conference.

== History ==
Methodism was founded in England by John Wesley and his younger brother Charles Wesley during the 18th century, initially as a revival movement within the Church of England. The spread of Methodism to Ireland was facilitated by English preachers, and the early Irish adherents were nicknamed 'Swaddlers', after John Cennick delivered a sermon in Dublin on "the babe in swaddling clothes" (Luke 2:12). It was John Wesley's twenty-one visits between 1747 and 1789 which were crucial in fostering the Irish Methodist community. He built and opened the first dedicated Methodist chapel in Ireland on Whitefriar Street in Dublin in 1752. By 1789 Methodist membership exceeded 14,000 in Ireland. Irish Methodism initially exerted the most influence among members of the established Church of Ireland and migrant European minorities, such as Moravians, Palatines and Huguenots. There were significantly fewer conversions to Methodism among Irish Catholics.

During the Great Famine, Methodist membership declined significantly from 44,000 in 1844 to 26,000 by 1855; over 15,000 members emigrated during the period from 1840 to 1859.

Irish Methodism experienced a division in 1816 due to disagreements regarding whether Irish preachers were authorised to administer the sacraments. This resulted in the formation of two distinct connexions: the Wesleyan Methodists and the Primitive Methodists. These two bodies reconciled and reunited in 1878, more than fifty years prior to the equivalent reunification in Britain. The all-Ireland denomination has continued despite the political partition of Ireland in 1922.

The church began to ordain women in 1978.

In 1997, Methodist membership was about 18,000. By 2018, there were 50,000 members and adherents across the island.

In 2002 the church signed a covenant with the Anglican Church of Ireland, leading to a closer working relationship.

In the early 2020s the majority of Irish Methodists live in Northern Ireland; however, there are Methodist churches in most of the populated areas in the Republic of Ireland (mainly along the eastern and southern coastline). At this time there are 191 congregations on the island, about 145 of which are in Northern Ireland.

== Methodist belief ==
The Methodist Church as part of the worldwide church shares those core beliefs which it believes to have been passed down from the time of the Apostles. Those beliefs are founded on the Bible and are summed up in the creeds, which are regularly used in Christian services of many denominations. It is widely considered that the Protestant Reformation focused on three main matters of belief: the primary authority of scripture; salvation by faith through faith in Christ, and; the priesthood of all believers. The Methodist Church affirms the importance of these matters.

John Wesley, the founder of Methodism, believed that certain aspects of the Christian Faith required special emphasis. An English Methodist minister, William Fitzgerald (1856–1931) summarised the core emphases of Wesleyan doctrine by using four statements that collectively are called the 'Four Alls'. These are expressed:

- All people need to be saved (total depravity)
- All people can be saved (unlimited atonement)
- All people can know they are saved (assurance of faith)
- All people can be saved to the uttermost (Christian perfection)

== Structure ==
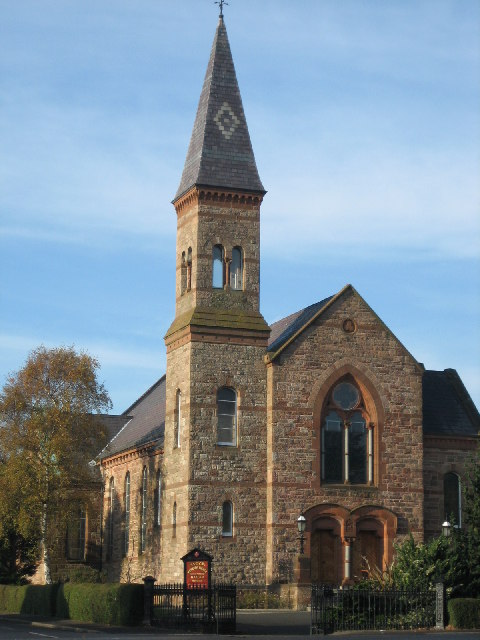
Knock Methodist Church, Belfast

The Methodist Church in Ireland works on a democratic structure. There are no bishops or ordained hierarchy. Authority in the Church is vested in the Conference and the trustees.

=== Classes ===
The small group (or 'class') has long been an organisational mainstay of Methodism. While now operating under a number of different names, such as Alpha Home groups, prayer triplets, or Bible studies, their essential purpose remains the same: the mutual encouragement and strengthening of church members through close fellowship.

=== Societies and circuits ===
These small groups gather, along with other people, to worship together on Sunday and "to work and witness in the community throughout the week". These congregations (or 'societies') can be linked with up to six or seven other congregations in the local area to form a 'circuit'. The direction of a circuit is guided by the Circuit Executive, composed of one senior minister ('Circuit superintendent'), other ministers, local preachers and a group of leaders from the member congregations.

=== Districts ===
There are 57 Methodist circuits on the island of Ireland, which have been gathered into three 'districts' to co-ordinate and motivate at a more general geographical level. Each district appoints a superintendent to oversee the work and provide pastoral support to the ministerial team.

=== Conference ===
The annual Conference is usually held over the second weekend of June each year. There are several boards and departments which work at the Connexional level to serve individuals and the Methodist Church in Ireland as a whole. Each year Conference elects an administrative and representative president for 12 months.

== Social action and education ==
The Methodist Church has made a large contribution to Ireland both through education and social action.

=== Social action ===
The church has an emphasis on social action in society. One of the church's mottoes is that the organisation is "Friends of all, enemies of none". The Methodist Church maintains a number of "City Missions". Work carried out by the City Missions includes listening services, homeless help, retirement and nursing homes and various other self-help groups. Strongly emphasised is that the relief of social and personal needs are addressed irrespective of creed. The Methodist Church attempts to make a proactive contribution to society as a whole through its Council on Social Responsibility, World Development & Relief Committee and Home missions department. The Church can also claim a positive contribution to the peace process in Northern Ireland.

==== LGBTQ issues and same-sex marriage ====
The Methodist Church of Ireland does not permit same-sex marriages. In 2024, the Methodist Church voted to apologise to the LGBTQ community for "all forms of homophobia," while also voting to reaffirm that the church defines marriage as "between one man and one woman." The church also accepted a report that "recommended individual churches and their councils could decide if people in same-sex relationships could serve in leadership roles," but an amendment reaffirming that sexual intercourse is reserved for marriage made it unclear if the recommendation would be implemented. The amendment stating that "faithfulness in marriage and celibacy outside of it" is "a standard for spiritual leadership and teaching roles" was approved with 56% in favour and 46% opposed.

=== Education ===
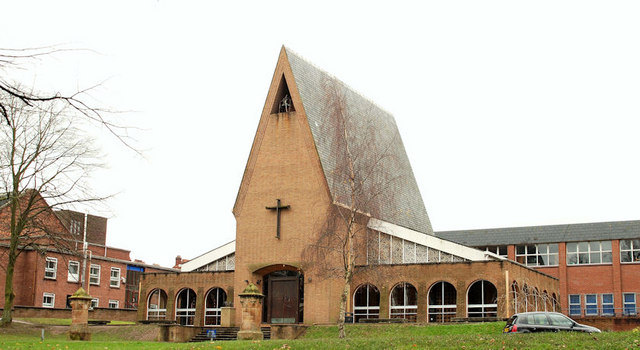
Chapel of Unity, Methodist College Belfast

The Methodist Church maintains two large secondary schools in Ireland, one north and one south. Methodist College Belfast has made a significant contribution to the life of Ireland and internationally, with some distinguished past pupils including Ernest Walton. Its counterpart in the Republic, Wesley College Dublin has a similar reputation. Famous past pupils of Wesley include George Bernard Shaw and Senator Gordon Wilson. The Methodist Church also maintains a number of primary schools in both the Republic and Northern Ireland.

In addition to these schools the church also maintains a theological college at Edgehill which has been in existence for over 80 years. Edgehill Theological College is a constituent college of the Queen's University, Belfast and provides a series of undergraduate and postgraduate degrees in theology, part-time courses in faith and worship and other areas of church life as well as correspondence courses and seminars. Edgehill is the ministerial training college for the Methodist Church in Ireland. The church also owns an agricultural college in the Republic of Ireland called Gurteen College.

=== Children's and youth work ===
Methodism has a long tradition of organised youth work, currently instigated and supported by the Irish Methodist Youth and Children's Department [IMYC] (formerly Department of Youth and Children's Work). The first full-time general secretary was appointed over thirty years ago. IMYC exists to establish links between the Church and children and young people, so that every generation in the church's life is appreciated and listened to. This involves representing and advocating youth and children's issues within the whole life of the Church as well as providing training to ministers and youth and children's workers.

The current general secretary is Gillian Gilmore.

It offers a year out discipleship and evangelism programme known as Team on Mission (TOM) which is currently in its 31st year; TOM succeeded the older programme known as Youth Evangelism Team (YET). The department also runs events such as Follow the Star (an interactive prayer room for under 8s), Soul Mates (For ages 9–13), Overflow (for young leaders aged 15+) and Autumn Soul (for ages 13+).

=== The Methodist Newsletter ===
The Methodist Newsletter is a newsletter produced by the Methodist Church in Ireland every month (except August).

== Contribution to Northern Ireland peace process ==
Map of Methodist population in Northern Ireland (2011 census). The Methodist population is highest in County Fermanagh; south County Antrim and Belfast; the Ards Peninsula; and the Upper Bann valley

=== Eric Gallagher ===
Eric Gallagher was president of the Methodist Church in Ireland and the first Protestant churchman who met with IRA representatives in Feakle, County Clare in the 1970s to try to broker a peace. The meeting was unsuccessful, and was broken up by the Garda Síochána, but the fugitive IRA men had already left.

=== Gordon Wilson ===
Another contribution to the Peace Process emerged from tragedy in 1987. Gordon Wilson, a member of the Church was the father of Marie Wilson, one of 11 victims of the Enniskillen Remembrance Sunday Parade bombing by the Provisional IRA. He came to national and international prominence with an emotional television interview he gave to the BBC the same evening in which he described his last conversation with his daughter, a nurse, as they both lay buried in rubble.

Wilson declared at the end of his interview that he forgave his daughter's killers and urged loyalist paramilitaries not to take revenge for her death. This was seen as a turning point in the peace process, that somebody so soon after such a disaster was able to forgive his own daughter's murderers. His contribution was honoured when he was invited to take a seat in Seanad Éireann by request of the Taoiseach in 1993.

=== Harold Good ===
In 2005, a former president of the Methodist Church in Ireland, Harold Good, was asked to be an independent witness for the historic decommissioning of IRA arms.

== Ecumenical relations ==
The Methodist Church is a member of several ecumenical bodies, including the World Council of Churches, the Conference of European Churches, Churches Together in Britain and Ireland, and the Irish Council of Churches.

== Into the future ==
In 1998 The Methodist Church in Ireland embarked on a period of reflection on its position within Irish Society which it called 'Dreaming Dreams'. Although in many areas of the country the Church is increasing in numbers it is aware that as a whole numbers are decreasing in church membership across the country in every denomination.

The church has since published its 'ConneXions' plan. The core vision of ConneXions is that each local Church will reflect the life of Christ in its own area. Each church was asked to participate in a community survey so as to find a policy in each church which will best match the needs of its locality. The Methodist Church hopes that this plan when fully implemented will put the entire connexion in a strong position for regrowth and redevelopment in the 21st Century whilst holding fast to the emphasises of the Wesleyan tradition on which it was formed.

In 2002 The Methodist Church in Ireland signed a covenant for greater cooperation and potential ultimate unity with the Church of Ireland.

== Presidents of the Methodist Church of Ireland ==
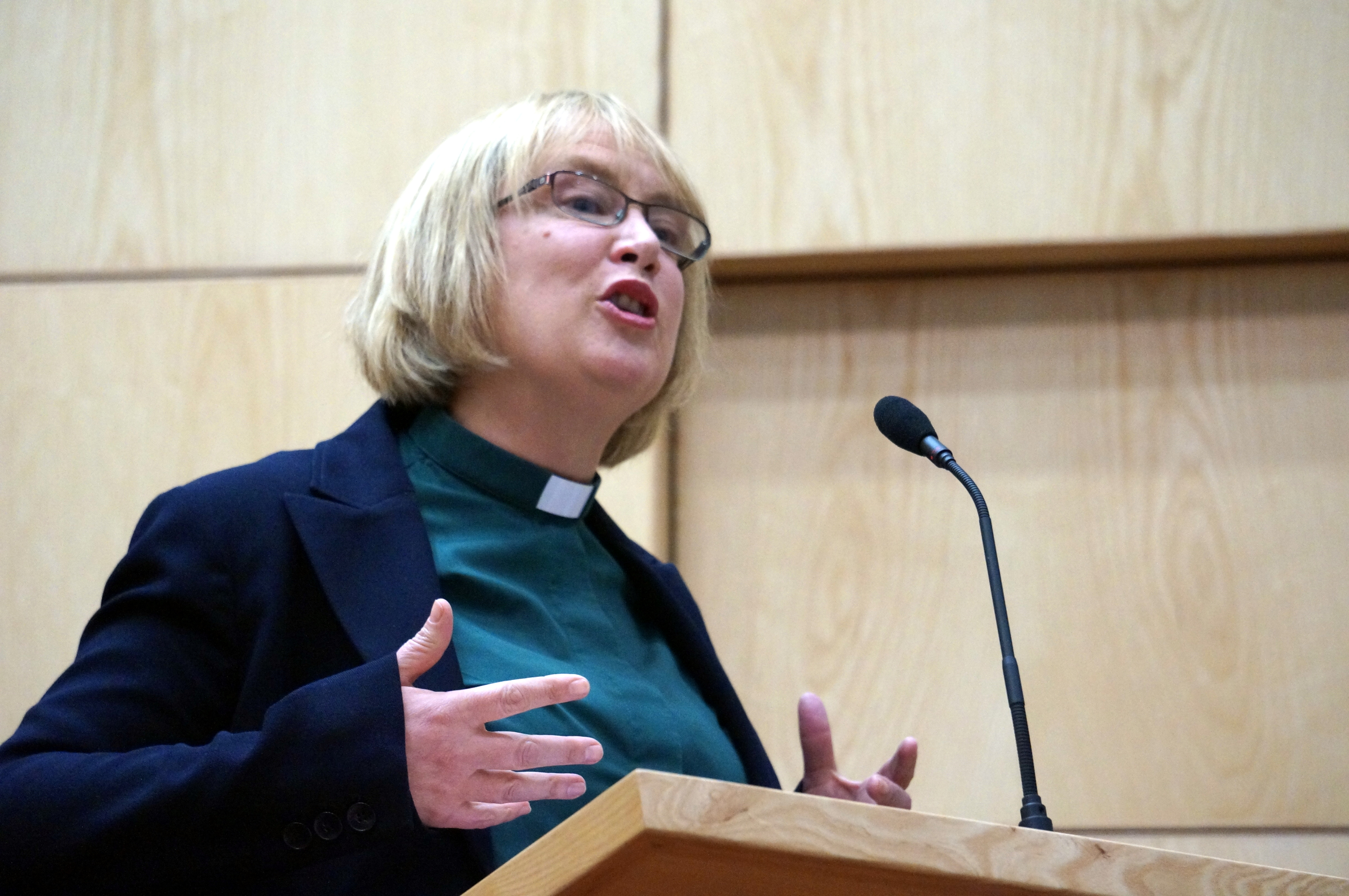
Rev. Dr. Heather Morris, President 2013–2014

- Rev. John Arthur Walton (father of Nobel Physics prize winner Ernest Walton)
- Rev. John Robertson (1929)
- Rev. William Henry Massey (1936–1937), died in office.
- Rev. W. E. Morley Thompson (1948–1949)
- Rev. Eric Gallagher (1967)
- Rev. Charles George Eyre (1982-1983)
- Rev. Sydney Frame (1985–1986)
- Rev. William I Hamilton (1986–1987)
- Rev. George Morrison (1987–1988)
- Rev. Stanley Whittington (1988–1989)
- Rev. Edmund T I Mawhinney (1994-1995)
- Rev. Ken Best (1996–1997)
- Rev. Dr. Norman Taggart (1997–1998)
- Rev. David Kerr (1999–2000)
- Rev. S. Kenneth Todd (2000–2001)
- Rev. Dr. Harold Good OBE (2001–2002)
- Rev. Winston Graham (2002–2003)
- Rev. Jim Rea MBE (2003–2004)
- Rev. Dr. Brian Fletcher (2004–2005)
- Rev. Desmond Bain (2005–2006)
- Rev. Ivan McElhinney (2006–2007)
- Rev. Roy Cooper (2007–2008)
- Rev. Aian Ferguson (2008–2009)
- Rev. Donald P. Ker (2009–2010)
- Rev. Paul Kingston (2010–2011)
- Rev. Ian D. Henderson (2011–2012)
- Rev. Kenneth Lindsay (2012–2013)
- Rev. Dr. Heather Morris (2013–2014), the first woman to hold the position.
- Rev. Peter Murray (2014–2015)
- Rev. Brian Anderson (2015–2016)
- Rev. Bill Mullaly (2016–2017)
- Rev. Dr. Laurence Graham (2017–2018)
- Rev. William Davison (2018–2019)
- Rev. Sam McGuffin (2019–2020)
- Rev. Tom McKnight (2020–2021)
- Rev. Dr Sahr Yambasu (2021–2022), the first non-white person to lead one of the Four Main Churches in Ireland.
- Rev. David Nixon (2022–2023)
- Rev. David Turtle (2023–2024)
- Rev Dr. John D Alderdice (2024–2025)
- Rev Alan Wardow (2025-2026)
- Rev Dr Janet Unsworth (2026-2027)

== Gallery ==
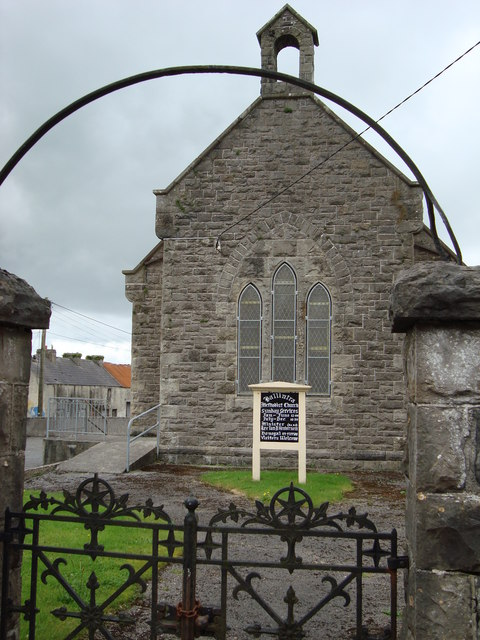
Methodist chapel in Ballintra

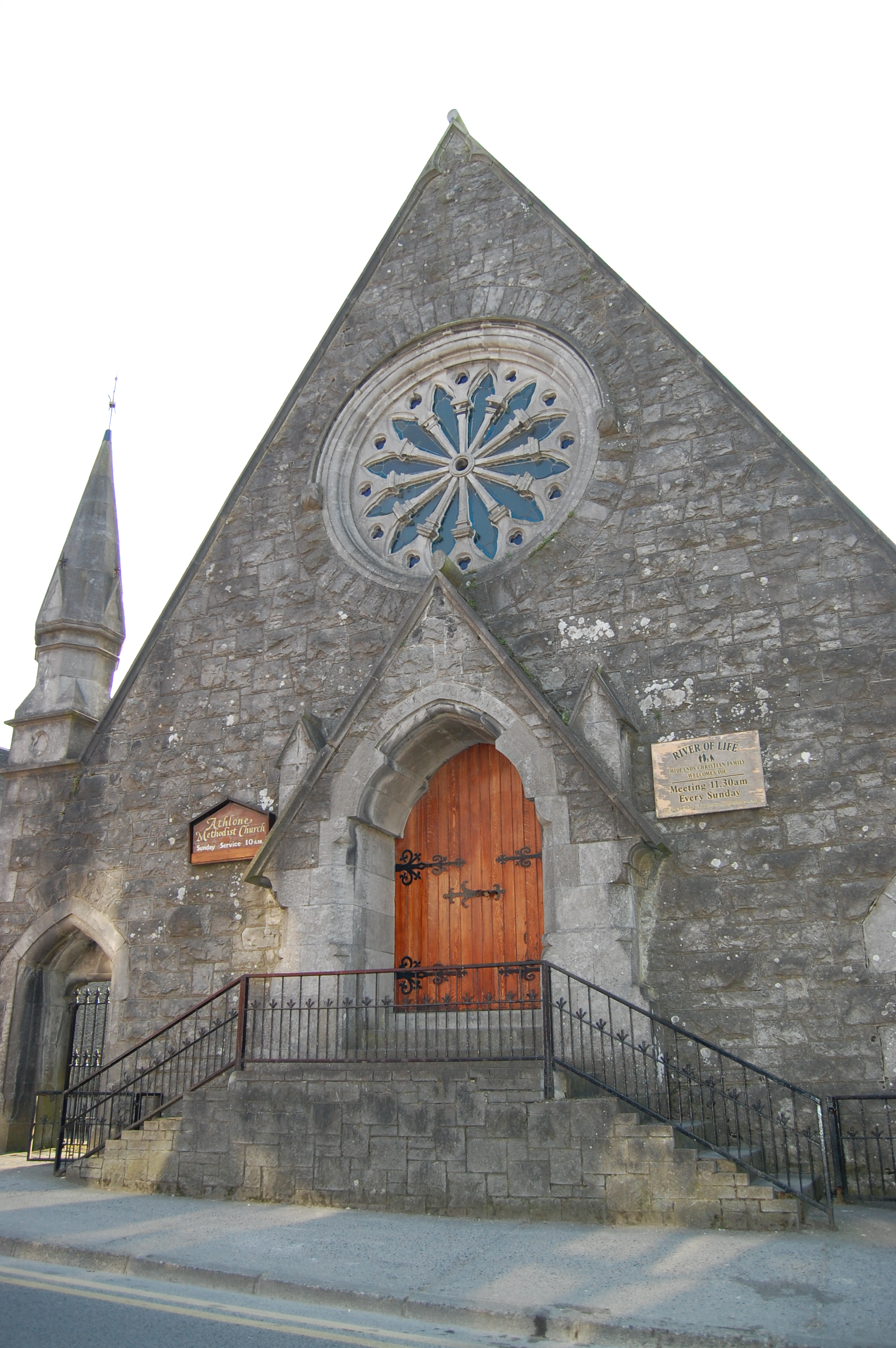
Methodist church in Athlone

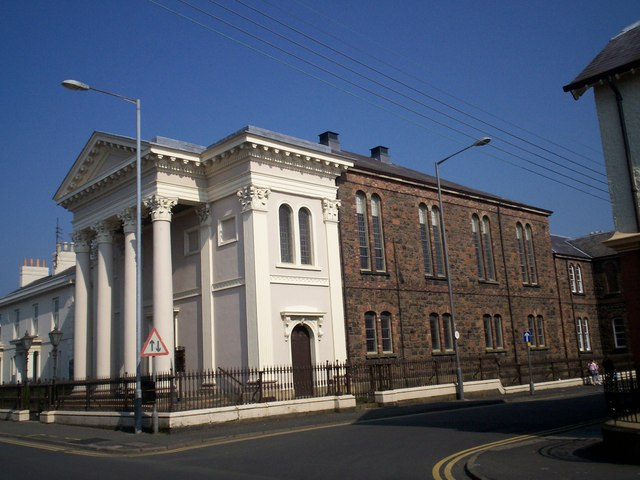
Thomas Street Methodist Church in Portadown

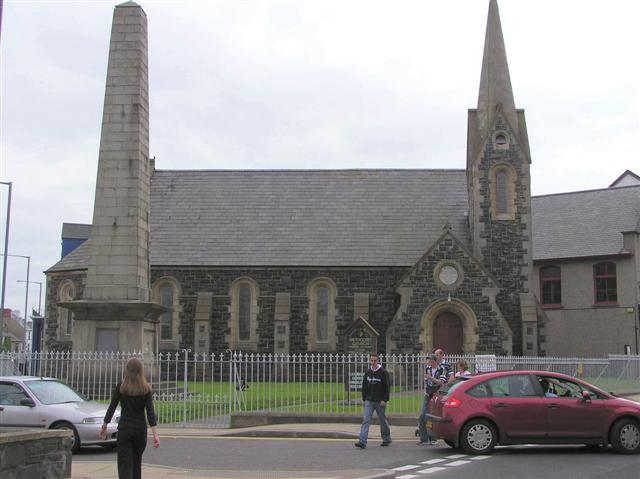
Methodist church in Portrush

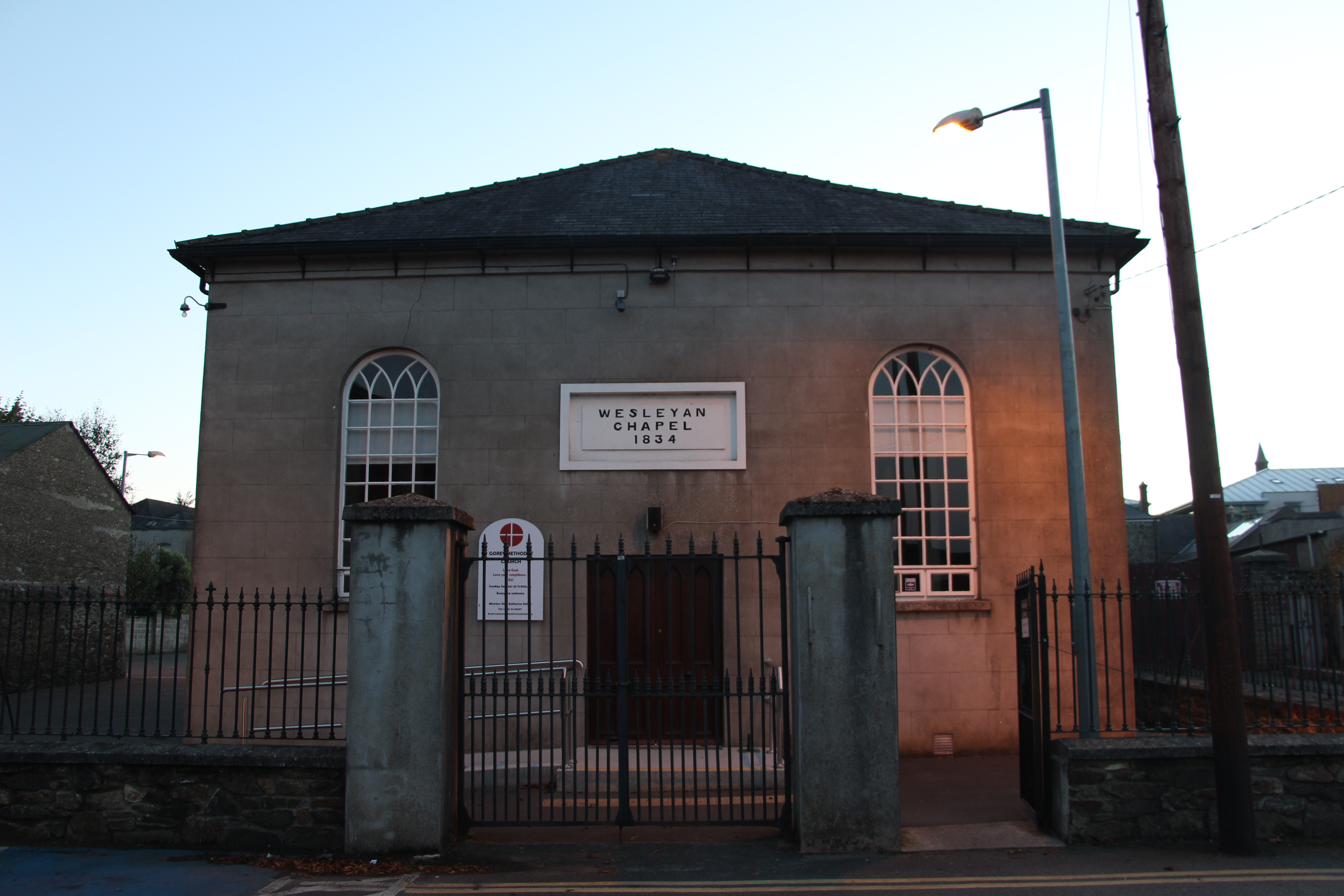
Gorey United Methodist and Presbyterian Church

== See also ==
- History of Christianity in Ireland
