= MacBride Principles =

The MacBride Principles — consisting of nine fair employment principles — are a corporate code of conduct for United States companies doing business in Northern Ireland and have become the congressional standard for all US aid to, or for economic dealings with, Northern Ireland.

The principles were developed by former New York City Comptroller Harrison J. Goldin in the early 1980s. They were endorsed by four well known Irish activists, two Catholic and two Protestants. One was Seán MacBride (a founding member of Amnesty International) and the principles became known as the MacBride Principles.

The Principles not only became adopted by the NYC government but they were quickly adopted by States and localities across the country. Goldin not only communicated with officials around the USA he visited Northern Ireland and Great Britain to meet with all sides in the dispute and to communicate the value of the Principles.

They were promoted by Seán McManus and the Irish National Caucus, and by John Finucane and the American Irish Political Education Committee (PEC). They were launched by Goldin in November 1984 for NYC.

== The principles ==
1. Increasing the representation of individuals from under-represented religious groups in the workforce including managerial, supervisory, administrative, clerical and technical jobs.
2. Adequate security for the protection of minority employees both at the workplace and while travelling to and from work.
3. The banning of provocative religious or political emblems at the workplace.
4. All job openings should be publicly advertised and special recruitment efforts should be made to attract applicants from under-represented religious groups.
5. Lay-off, recall and termination procedures should not in practice favour particular religious groupings.
6. The abolition of job reservations, apprenticeship restrictions and differential employment criteria, which discriminate on the basis of religious or ethnic origin.
7. The development of training programmes that will prepare substantial numbers of current minority employees for skilled jobs, including the expansion of existing programme s and the creation of new programmes to train, upgrade, and improve the skills of minority employees.
8. The establishment of procedures to assess, identify, and actively recruit minority employees with the potential for further advancement.
9. The appointment of a senior management staff member to oversee the company's affirmative action efforts and the setting up of timetables to carry out affirmative action principles.

In addition to the above, each signatory to the principles is required to report annually to an independent monitoring agency on its progress in the implementation of these principles.

Some of the principles were seen as unrealistic and impracticable, such as protection of employees on their way to and from work. Besides, they were perceived as throttling foreign investment in Northern Ireland and by that increasing the economic problems of the province. No cases were mentioned where a specific American investment had led to discrimination.

There was acceptance, but also a lack of great enthusiasm, by both the Government of the Republic of Ireland, and by moderate nationalists in Northern Ireland, amongst them the Social Democratic and Labour Party (SDLP), as the principles chimed with developing European labour law provisions. In 1987 the then Irish Minister for Foreign Affairs, Brian Lenihan was quoted as follows regarding the McBride Principles: “The Government's policy is to press for action by the British Government on measures in the short and medium term aimed at promoting equality of opportunity…”. He later wrote in 1989 “The Government's view is that there is nothing objectionable in the MacBride principles”.

== Parallel British reforms ==
Within Northern Ireland itself, reforms had begun after the British government suspended the Parliament of Northern Ireland in March 1972, starting with the Fair Employment (Northern Ireland) Act 1976. This was further amended in 1989. In 1999 the Fair Employment and Treatment Order 1998 became law.

Since then complaints are handled by the Fair Employment Commission for Northern Ireland, now a part of the Equality Commission for Northern Ireland, a non-governmental but publicly funded agency. The MacBride Principles certainly speeded the reform process in the 1980s, but it is debatable whether they contributed significantly after 1989. In a 2003 report the Irish National Caucus felt that the reforms had not yet achieved complete parity, emphasising that Northern Irish Catholics were still more likely to be unemployed and undereducated, and less likely to work in managerial positions, than other groups, and calling for affirmative action policies.

== Campaign ==
The MacBride Campaign is conducted on a three-fold level:

1. Federal - The MacBride Principles became the law of the U.S. in October 1998. The U.S. House and Senate passed the MacBride Principles as part of the Omnibus Appropriations Act for Fiscal Year 1999, and President Clinton signed them into law. The MacBride law mandates that recipients of U.S. contributions to the International Fund for Ireland (IFI) must be in compliance with the MacBride Principles. (The U.S. has been contributing about $19.6 million per year since 1986 to the IFI.)
2. State and Cities - Millions of dollars in state and city pension funds are invested in American corporations doing business in Northern Ireland. The MacBride Campaign lobbies to have legislation passed to direct these funds to be invested, in the future, only in companies that endorse the Principles (again, note, not divestment or disinvestments). This is the first step. The second step — once the MacBride Principles investment law has been passed — is to lobby cities and states to enact a "selective purchasing" law, barring the state or city from purchasing goods or services from companies in Northern Ireland that have not endorsed the Principles.
3. Shareholder resolutions - The Campaign works to have shareholders introduce and pass resolutions asking companies to endorse the Principles.

== Endorsement ==
The MacBride Principles have been passed in the following 18 US states: Connecticut, Florida, Illinois, Maine, Massachusetts, Michigan, Minnesota, Kentucky, Missouri, Nebraska, New Hampshire, New Jersey, New York, Pennsylvania, Rhode Island, Texas, Vermont and California.

They have also been passed or endorsed by over 40 cities, and are pending in many more. The following organizations and individuals have also endorsed them:

- American Irish Political Education Committee
- The Reverend Jesse Jackson
- Randall Robinson of TransAfrica, the group that sponsored Nelson Mandela's visit to the United States
- Former New York State Governor George Pataki
- Former New York State Governor Mario Cuomo
- Former New York City Mayor Rudolph Giuliani
- Former New York City Mayor David Dinkins
- Former Boston Mayor Raymond Flynn (and former Ambassador to the Vatican)
- The AFL-CIO
- The National Council of Churches
- The American Baptist Convention
- The Episcopal Church
- The Lutheran Pension Board
- The United Church of Christ Board of World Ministries
- The United Methodist Church
- Some American Roman Catholic bishops
- Virtually all Irish-American organizations.
