= Albert H. Blumenthal =

American lawyer and politician (1928–1984)

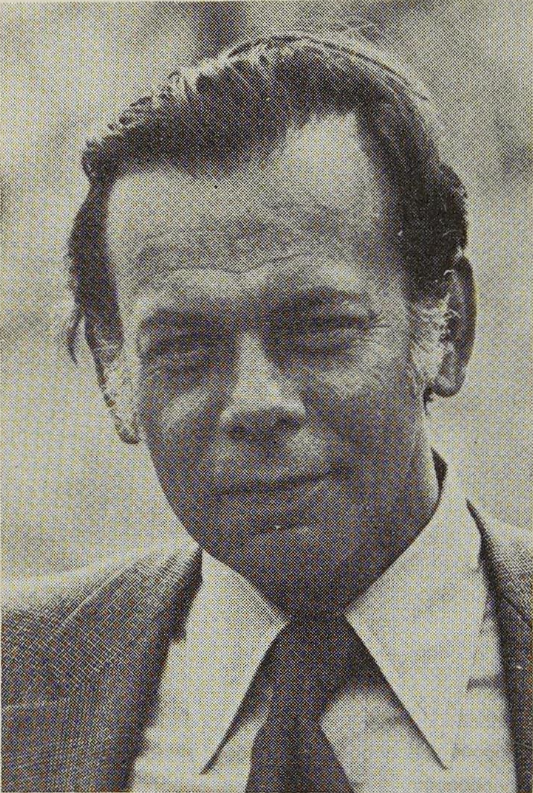
Blumenthal's New York State Assembly portrait.

Albert Howard Blumenthal (October 13, 1928 – July 8, 1984) was an American lawyer and politician from New York.

== Life ==
Blumenthal was born on October 13, 1928, in Flatbush, Brooklyn, New York City, the son of Bennet M. Blumenthal (1888–1980) and Matilda Blumenthal. He graduated B.A. from the College of William & Mary in 1949, and LL.B. from New York University School of Law in 1951. He served in the U.S. Army from 1951 to 1953. He was admitted to the bar in 1953, practiced law in New York City, and entered politics as a Democrat. On May 18, 1958, he married Joel Marie Winik, and they had four children.

Blumenthal was a member of the New York State Assembly from 1963 to 1976, sitting in the 174th, 175th, 176th, 177th, 178th, 179th, 180th and 181st New York State Legislatures. He was Chairman of the Committee on Health from 1966 to 1968.

In 1973, he ran in the Democratic primary for Mayor of New York City but came in fourth with 16% of the vote, behind Abraham Beame (34%), Herman Badillo (29%), and Mario Biaggi (21%).

At the general election in November, Blumenthal ran on the Liberal ticket but was again defeated by Beame. Blumenthal was Majority Leader of the State Assembly in 1975 and 1976.

In December 1975, Blumenthal was indicted for perjury in connection with his support of nursing-home operator Bernard Bergman. In February 1976, Blumenthal moved to dismiss the charges. At first, bribery was also added to the indictment, but on April 13, 1976, all charges were dismissed. On June 9, 1976, he announced that he would not run again for the Assembly. On December 14, 1976, the New York Supreme Court, Appellate Division unanimously upheld the dismissal of all charges against Blumenthal.

Afterwards he moved to Larchmont, in Westchester County. Later he was a member of the New York State Commission on Law Revision.

He died on July 8, 1984, at Memorial Sloan Kettering Cancer Center in Manhattan, at age 55.

== General Reference ==
- Albert H. Blumenthal Papers, 1963-1976. M.E. Grenander Department of Special Collections and Archives, University Libraries, University at Albany, State University of New York (hereafter referred to as the Blumenthal Papers).

New York State Assembly
Preceded by Bentley Kassal	New York State Assembly; New York County, 5th District; 1963–1965	Succeeded by district abolished
Preceded by new district	New York State Assembly; 73rd District; 1966	Succeeded by John J. Walsh
Preceded by Jerome W. Marks	New York State Assembly; 67th District; 1967–1972	Succeeded by Richard N. Gottfried
Preceded by Franz S. Leichter	New York State Assembly; 69th District; 1973–1976	Succeeded by Jerrold Nadler
Political offices
Preceded by John E. Kingston	Majority Leader of the New York State Assembly; 1975–1976	Succeeded by Stanley Fink
