= Edgehill Theological College =

Methodist college in Ireland

Edgehill House
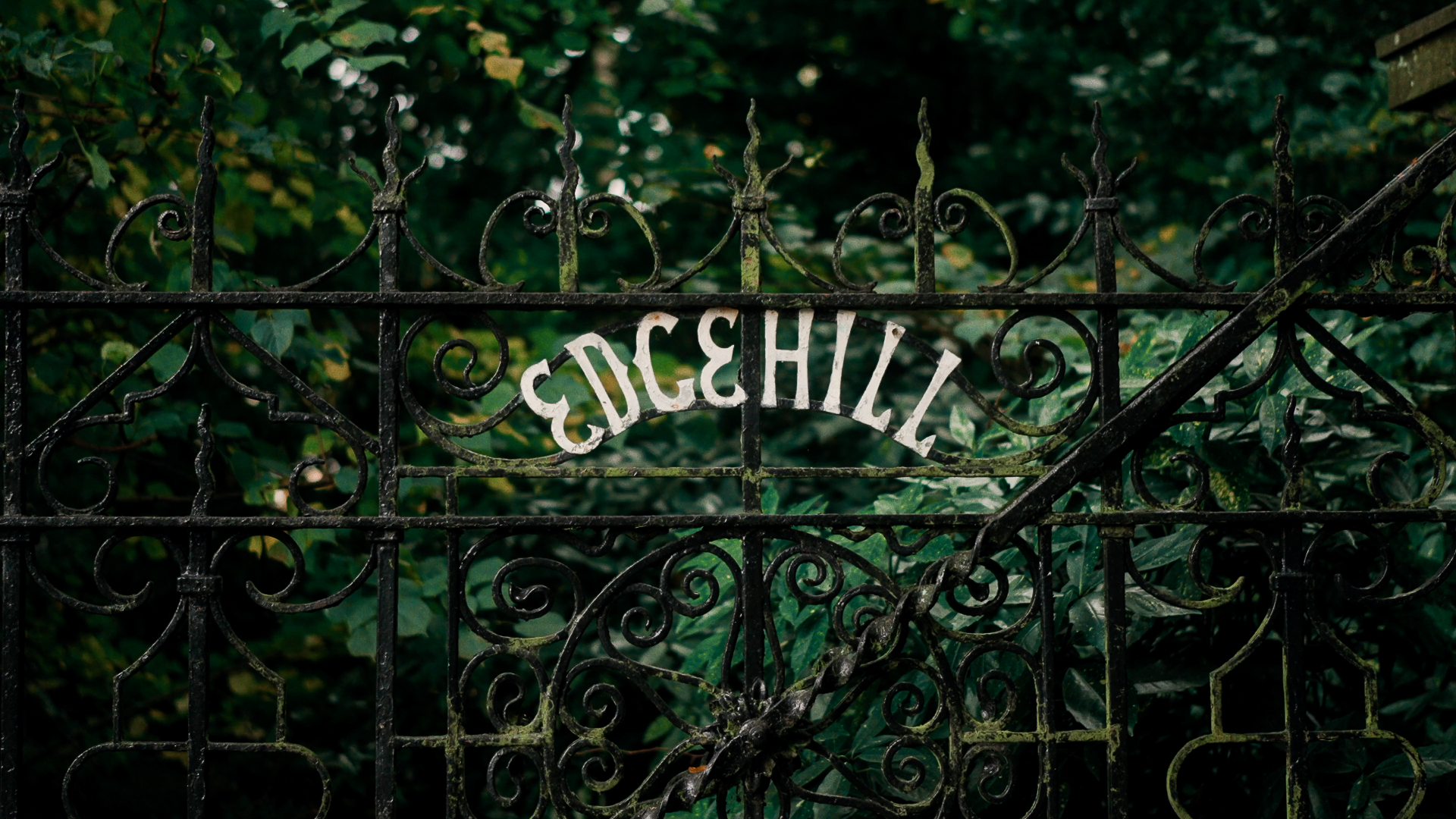
- Motto: Living wholeheartedly as followers of Jesus for the transformation of the world
- Established: 1926
- Religious affiliation: Methodist Church in Ireland
- Academic affiliations: Cliff College
- Location: 9 Lennoxvale, Belfast, Co. Antrim. BT9 5BY, Belfast, Northern Ireland
- Website: www.irishmethodist.org

Edgehill House (formerly Edgehill Theological College) is the training institution for ministry in the Methodist Church in Ireland, and has also for some time held the headquarters of that church.

== History ==
Edgehill Theological College was established in 1928 as the institution responsible for ministerial training within the Methodist Church in Ireland. It replaced the “Theological Hall” which had been based within Methodist College, Belfast. Over many years, the College facilitated ministerial formation, lay training, and peace and reconciliation work, and developed partnerships with a range of academic institutions.

(Ratified by Northern Ireland Parliament Act 1928) out of the Theology Department of Methodist College Belfast.

In January 2019, all connexional teams of the Methodist Church in Ireland moved onto the Edgehill site. This process has facilitated closer collaboration in support of the mission of the wider church. The Ministries Team became responsible for the work which was previously carried out by Edgehill Theological College. The College premises at 9 Lennoxvale have been renamed Edgehill House to signify this new phase in the life and mission of the church.

The Methodist Historical Society in Ireland (based at Edgehill House) holds a large archive of documents, particularly relating to the rise of Methodism in Ireland in the 18th century. This includes rare documents of a demographic nature, memoirs, and letters, all of which are storied in a temperature controlled room.
