= Seán McManus (priest) =

American-Irish priest and activist

Seán Gabriel McManus (born 1944 in County Fermanagh, Northern Ireland) is an American human rights, justice, peace campaigner and Roman Catholic priest.

== Birth and family ==
McManus was born in the parish of Kinawley, County Fermanagh, Northern Ireland. He is a brother of Frank McManus, former Unity MP, and Patrick McManus, a member of the IRA who was killed in an explosion in 1958 during the IRA's "Border Campaign".

== Activism ==
In 1971, McManus was a Redemptorist Father in Perth, Scotland. In August 1971, he was arrested in Enniskillen, County Fermanagh, Northern Ireland, after a demonstration, because he intervened to stop the police beating up a young boy. The police stopped beating the boy and arrested him instead. In the following court proceedings, he was sentenced to a fine of £20 and proclaimed:

"I refused to recognize the Court because it has no legitimate authority. But that is only the “tip of the iceberg. I do not, I never have and I never will recognize the colonial State of British Occupied Ireland. This State exists because of a morally and politically criminal action. It was illegally imposed by force, and it is illegally sustained by force, against the will of the Irish people. Therefore, its institutions, its laws, and its legal and political expressions are invalid.”

However, he subsequently supported the Good Friday Agreement, which states:

"that while a substantial section of the people in Northern Ireland share the legitimate wish of a majority of the people of the island of Ireland for a united Ireland, the present wish of a majority of the people of Northern Ireland, freely exercised and legitimate, is to maintain the Union and, accordingly, that Northern Ireland’s status as part of the United Kingdom reflects and relies upon that wish; and that it would be wrong to make any change in the status of Northern Ireland save with the consent of a majority of its people"

In 1972, McManus was sent to serve as a priest in the United States. In 1974, he founded the Irish National Caucus (INC), a group formed to lobby the United States Congress on behalf of the cause of justice and peace in Northern Ireland. McManus formed the organization around principles promulgated by the 1971 Synod of Bishops in their document "Justice in the World" which states: "Action on behalf of justice ... [is] a constitutive dimension of the preaching of the Gospel ... and [a constitutive of dimension] of the Church's mission for the redemption of the human race and [for] its liberation from every oppressive situation."

The INC has developed a solid reputation within Congress, with Ben Gilman, former Chairman of the House International Relations Committee, stating, "No one has done more than Father McManus to keep the U.S. Congress on track regarding justice and peace in Ireland. Indeed, I believe historians will record that no one since John Devoy (1842 – 1928) has done more to organize American pressure for justice in Ireland. The only difference being that Father McManus – in keeping with his priestly calling – is committed to nonviolence."

In 2011, McManus was chosen to serve on the World Peace Prize Awarding Council, The South Korea-based Council consists of twelve international and interfaith members. and in 2013, was selected to be their chief judge.

=== The MacBride Principles ===
The MacBride Principles – a corporate code of conduct for American companies doing business in Northern Ireland – was launched by the Irish National Caucus on November 4, 1984. The MacBride Principles both symbolized and effectuated the Caucus’ major campaign to stop the U.S. dollars subsidizing anti-Catholic discrimination in Northern Ireland. The Principles became law in 18 U.S. states and numerous towns and cities. In October 1998, the MacBride Principles were passed by both the U.S. Senate and the U.S. House of Representatives and signed into the U.S. law. Chairman Gilman took to the floor of the U.S. House of Representatives to welcome this singular achievement, saying: "I want to make a special note regarding Father Sean McManus. No one has fought harder against discrimination in Northern Ireland. Father Sean single-handedly brought the MacBride fair employment principles to ... enactment."
