= 1945 New York City Council election =

1945 election to the New York City Council

- November 6, 1945
	Majority party	Minority party	Third party
Party	Democratic	Republican	American Labor
Seats won	14	3	2
	Fourth party	Fifth party
Party	Liberal	Communist
Seats won	2	2

The 1945 New York City Council election was held on November 6, 1945, to elect members of the New York City Council. The election was held concurrently with the 1945 New York City mayoral election. Democrats retained their majority on the council.

The election was the last to use a system of proportional representation with the single transferable vote. The system had been adopted in 1936 and was used for council elections from 1937 until it was repealed by referendum in 1947.

Under this system, council members were elected from large multi-member borough constituencies, which allowed representation for smaller parties such as the American Labor Party and the Communist Party USA.

Communist Party councillors Peter Cacchione of Brooklyn At-Large, and Benjamin J. Davis Jr. of Manhattan At-Large were among the prominent members associated with the proportional representation era and were reelected during this period.

== Borough constituencies ==
Under the proportional representation system, councillors were elected from borough-wide constituencies.

== Elected members ==
Members elected, for terms commencing January 1 1946 included:

- Ira Palestin
- Benjamin J. Davis Jr.
- Peter Cacchione
- Louis P. Goldberg
- Eugene P. Connolly

== See also ==
- 1945 New York City mayoral election
- 1937 New York City Council election
- Proportional representation in the United States
