= 1973 New York City Council presidential election =

- November 6, 1973
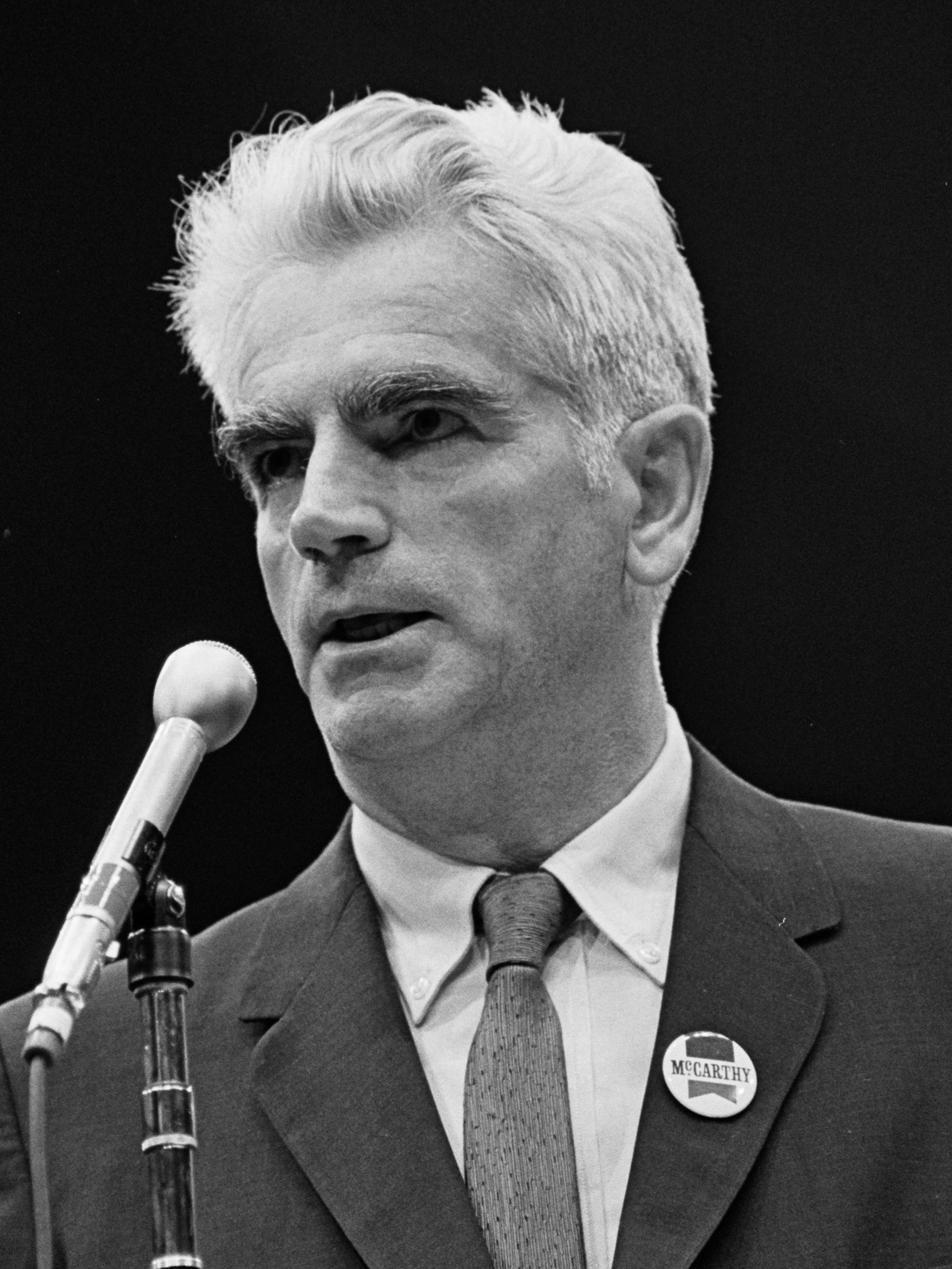

Nominee	Paul O'Dwyer	Thomas F. Galvin	Simeon Golar
Party	Democratic	Republican	Liberal
Alliance		Conservative
Popular vote	867,515	442,655	149,447
Percentage	59.4%	30.3%	10.2%
President of the City Council before election
Sanford Garelik
Democratic
Elected President of the City Council
Paul O'Dwyer
Democratic

An election was held on November 6, 1973 to elect the President of the New York City Council. Democratic incumbent Sanford Garelik initially did not run for re-election, choosing instead to run for mayor in the Democratic Party primary. After dropping out of the mayoral primary and running for re-election, Garelik was defeated in the Democratic primary by Paul O'Dwyer.

In the general election, O'Dwyer defeated Thomas F. Galvin and Simeon Golar by a wide margin.

== Democratic primary ==
=== Candidates ===
- Anthony G. DiFalco, Assemblyman from Manhattan
- Sanford Garelik, incumbent City Council President since 1970
- Paul O'Dwyer, former City Councilman from Manhattan at-large and candidate for U.S. Senate in 1968 and 1970

=== Results ===
1973 Democratic Council President primary (unofficial)
Party	Candidate	Votes	%
Democratic	Paul O'Dwyer	268,919	41.40%
Democratic	Sanford Garelik (incumbent)	232,509	35.80%
Democratic	Anthony G. DiFalco	148,115	22.80%
Total votes		649,543	100.00%

Garelik dropped out of the mayoral race at the filing deadline on April 12, filing instead for re-election as Council President.

Because O'Dwyer received more than forty percent of the vote, a runoff was not necessary. Nevertheless, Garelik asserted that "irregularities", including the misplacement of voter identification cards, had marred the election and called for a recount. In light of these claims, Garelik said, “it was almost a miracle I did as well as I did.” He pledged to contest the general election as an independent in the event that the recount did not succeed in forcing a runoff.

O'Dwyer, who had lost races for city and statewide offices in 1965, 1968 and 1970, suggested Garelik was not "accustomed" to losing.

== General election ==
=== Candidates ===
- Thomas F. Galvin, architect, real estate developer, and former chair of the New York City Board of Standards and Appeals (Republican and Conservative)
- Simeon Golar, former chair of the New York City Housing Authority and aide to mayor John Lindsay (Liberal)
- Paul O'Dwyer, former City Councilman from Manhattan at-large and candidate for U.S. Senate in 1968 and 1970 (Democratic)

=== Results ===
1973 New York City Council President election
Party	Candidate	Votes	%
Democratic	Paul O'Dwyer	867,515	59.43%
Republican	Thomas F. Galvin	442,655	30.33%
Liberal	Simeon Golar	149,447	10.24%
Total votes		1,459,617	100.00%
