= 1969 New York City Council presidential election =

- November 4, 1969
Nominee	Sanford Garelik	Francis X. Smith	Robert F. Kelly
Party	Liberal	Democratic	Conservative
Alliance	Republican; Independent	Civil Service
Popular vote	1,012,757	899,330	166,602
Percentage	48.7%	43.3%	8.0%
President of the City Council before election
Francis X. Smith
Democratic
Elected President of the City Council
Sanford Garelik
Independent Democratic

An election was held on November 4, 1969 to elect the President of the New York City Council. Democratic incumbent Francis X. Smith ran for re-election to a full term in office but was defeated by Sanford Garelik, a police officer running on the Republican and Liberal lines. Although Garelik was a registered Democrat, this remains the last time a candidate on the Republican ticket won the election to New York City's second-ranking office.

== Background ==
On December 31, 1968, incumbent Council President Frank D. O'Connor resigned to serve on the New York Supreme Court. At the behest of party leaders, the City Council elected Queens councilman Francis X. Smith on January 8, 1969 to complete O'Connor's term in office which was set to expire on December 31, 1969.

== Republican primary ==
=== Candidates ===
- Sanford Garelik, Chief Inspector of the New York Police Department (also running as Liberal with John Lindsay)
- Robert F. Kelly, Assemblyman from Bay Ridge (also running as Conservative with John Marchi)

=== Campaign ===
Garelik, a registered Democrat, ran in both the Republican and Liberal primaries as the running mate of incumbent mayor John Lindsay. Opponents challenged Garelik's legal right to run in the primary as a registered Democrat, but his eligibility was upheld by unanimously by the Appellate Division of the State Supreme Court.

=== Results ===
Garelik won the nomination, despite Lindsay's loss to State Senator John J. Marchi in the concurrent mayoral primary. The Lindsay candidate for Controller, Vito B. Battista, also won.

1969 Republican Council President primary (unofficial)
Party	Candidate	Votes	%
Republican	Sanford Garelik	109,518	53.74%
Republican	Robert F. Kelly	94,280	46.26%
Total votes		203,798	100.00%

== Democratic primary ==
=== Candidates ===
- Jimmy Breslin, New York Daily News columnist (running with Norman Mailer)
- Hugh Carey, U.S. Representative from Brooklyn (running with Robert F. Wagner Jr.)
- Elinor Guggenheimer, philanthropist and urban planner (running with Herman Badillo)
- Robert A. Low, member of the City Council
- Charles B. Rangel, Assemblyman from Harlem (running with James Scheuer)
- Francis X. Smith, incumbent Council President since January 1969 (running with Mario Procaccino)

All of the candidates except Low were aligned with a mayoral candidate. Low and Carey initially ran for mayor themselves, but each dropped out after former mayor Robert F. Wagner Jr. entered that race.

=== Results ===
1969 Democratic Council President primary (unofficial)
Party	Candidate	Votes	%
Democratic	Hugh Carey	160,299	23.46%
Democratic	Francis X. Smith	160,127	23.43%
Democratic	Robert A. Low	125,503	18.37%
Democratic	Elinor Guggenheimer	90,709	13.28%
Democratic	Jimmy Breslin	75,480	11.05%
Democratic	Charles B. Rangel	71,139	10.41%
Total votes		683,257	100.00%

Initial, unofficial results gave Carey a lead over Smith of only 172 votes, but the official count put Smith ahead.

== General election ==
=== Candidates ===
- Sanford Garelik, Chief Inspector of the New York Police Department (Republican and Liberal)
- Robert F. Kelly, Republican Assemblyman from Bay Ridge (Conservative)
- Francis X. Smith, interim City Council President since January 1969 (Democratic and Nonpartisan Civil Service)

=== Campaign ===
At the start of the campaign, the unknown Garelik was given little chance of unseating the incumbent Smith. Despite Lindsay's loss in the Republican primary, Garelik continued to campaign with him rather than Republican nominee John J. Marchi and considered himself part of the Lindsay ticket. Marchi attempted to force Garelik off the ticket by appealing to the Board of Elections for his removal, but the Board declined to do so.

Owing to the candidates' backgrounds, criminal justice was a defining issue in the campaign. Although the office had no formal law enforcement role, Lindsay publicly said that he would use Garelik, as Council President, to design a comprehensive narcotics control program for the city. Smith, a former assistant district attorney from Queens, attributed crime to increased use of narcotics and advocated for the use of methadone to reduce heroin usage. He further called for the city to use state prisons to reduce "the intolerable overcrowding in city prisons," which he said was an obstacle to rehabilitation, and the legalization of off-track betting to free up police resources.

Garelik cited his career with the NYPD and defended Mayor Lindsay from charges that his policies were to blame for rising crime, which he called a threat to "the social fabric of our democracy." Garelik called for severe penalties for drug dealers and racketeers and the creation of a special narcotics court.

Kelly, a significant underdog, sought to appeal to conservative Republicans as the only "real" Republican candidate running.

=== Results ===
1969 New York City Council President election
Party	Candidate	Votes	%	±%
Liberal	Sanford Garelik	730,755 (Note: The total vote for Garelik on the Liberal Party line is combined with his total on the Independent line.)	35.15%	
Republican	Sanford Garelik	282,002	13.57%	
Total	Sanford Garelik	1,012,757	48.72%	
Democratic	Francis X. Smith (incumbent)	831,358	39.99%	
NPCS	Francis X. Smith (incumbent)	67,972	3.27%	
Total	Francis X. Smith (incumbent)	899,330	43.26%	
Conservative	Robert F. Kelly	166,602	8.01%	
Total votes		2,078,689	100.00%	
