= 1945 New York City mayoral election =

- November 6, 1945
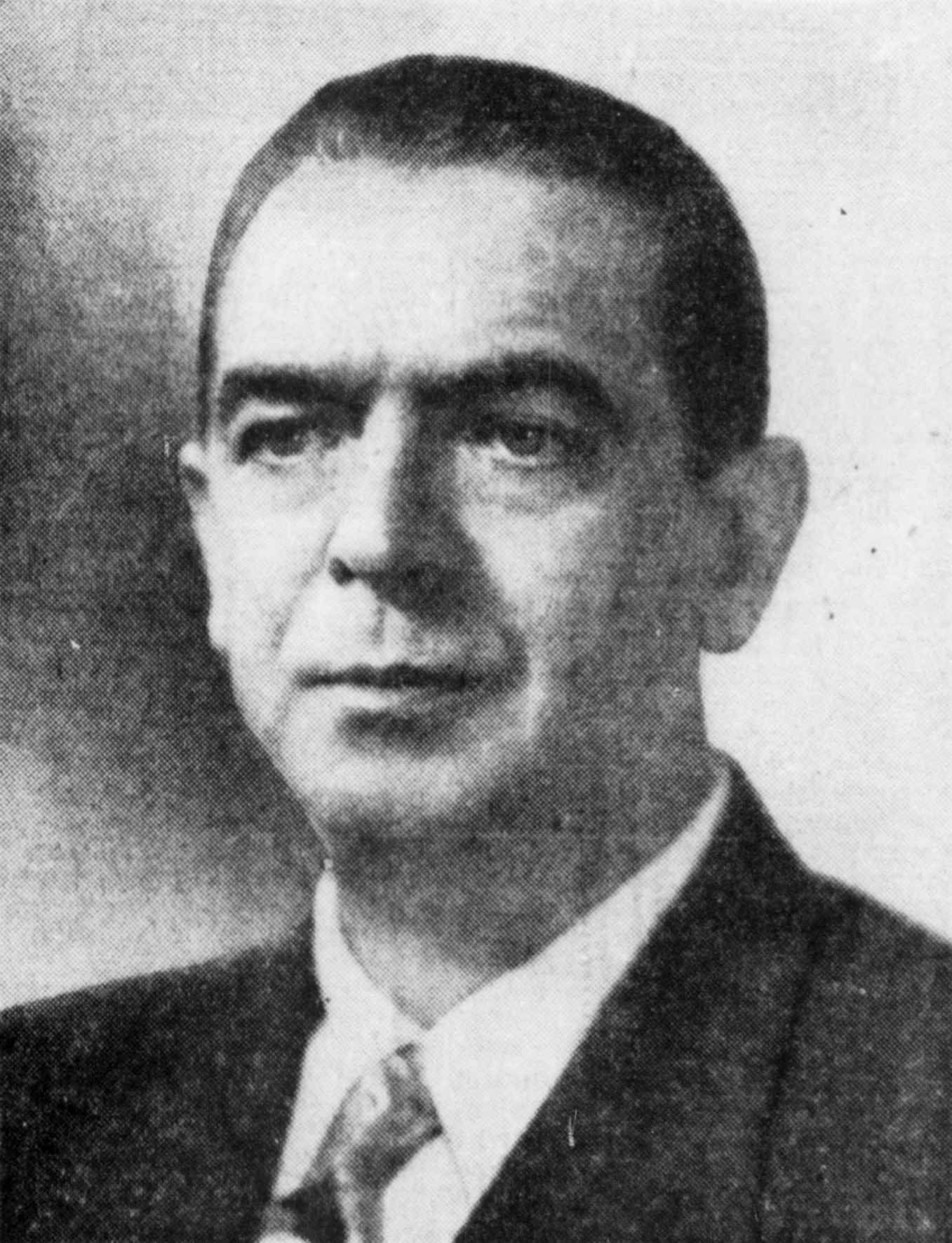

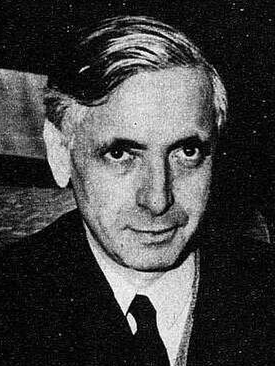

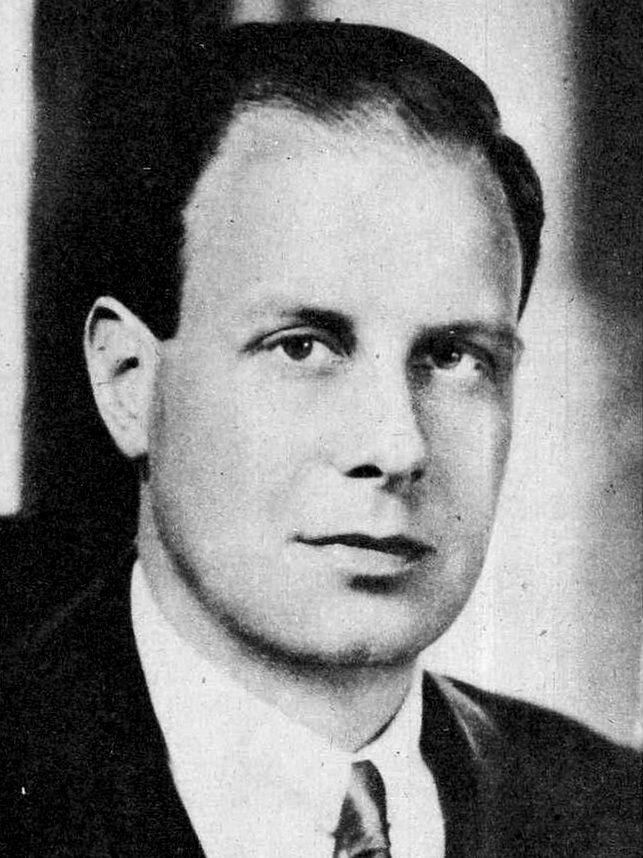
Candidate	William O'Dwyer	Jonah J. Goldstein	Newbold Morris
Party	Democratic	Republican	No Deal
Alliance	American Labor	Liberal; City Fusion
Popular vote	1,125,355	431,601	408,408
Percentage	56.8%	21.8%	20.6%
- Borough results O'Dwyer: 50–60% 60–70%
Mayor before election
Fiorello H. La Guardia
Republican
Elected mayor
William O'Dwyer
Democratic

The 1945 New York City mayoral election took place on November 6, 1945, in New York City. The candidates were King County District Attorney William O'Dwyer, a Democrat, and Jonah J. Goldstein, a Republican judge, as well as other, third-party candidates.

O'Dwyer won the contest with 56.77% of the vote.

== Democratic nomination ==
William O'Dwyer, who had built his reputation as Brooklyn's top prosecutor on his case against Murder, Inc., ran for mayor once again. In 1941, William O'Dwyer lost to incumbent Fiorello LaGuardia by over 100,000 votes. In the following years, however, he enhanced his political image by enlisting in World War II. Behind the scenes, he also cultivated ties to powerful members of Tammany Hall, which had reluctantly backed his 1941 campaign, and allegedly sought common cause with organized crime figures such as Frank Costello.

With both popular and party support, O'Dwyer had no trouble gaining the Democratic nomination for a second consecutive campaign, though he bowed to pressure from U.S. Representative Vito Marcantonio and gangster Thomas Luchese to nominate Vincent Impellitteri for president of the City Council.

The American Labor Party, led by Marcantonio, also nominated O'Dwyer.

== Republican nomination ==
=== Candidates ===
- Jonah J. Goldstein, judge of the Court of General Sessions

==== Declined ====
- Newbold Morris, president of the New York City Council (ran as No Deal candidate)

Morris was meant to be on the Republican slate, but he refused the nomination and attacked Goldstein as a "discarded Tammany candidate for mayor". La Guardia asked Morris to run and he announced his candidacy as the nominee of the No Deal Party on August 5.

== Liberal nomination ==
=== Candidates ===
- Jonah J. Goldstein, judge of the Court of General Sessions
- Newbold Morris, president of the New York City Council

==== Withdrew ====
- Joseph McGoldrick, New York City Comptroller (endorsed Goldstein)

==== Declined ====
- Wendell Willkie, Republican nominee for President of the United States in 1940

=== Campaign ===
The Liberal Party of New York wanted Wendell Willkie to run for mayor and met with him in May 1944. He was interested in the idea, but died in October. The Liberals attempted to negotiate with the Democrats, but O'Dwyer had ties to the ALP. Morris, while running as a Republican, sought the party's support and the Liberals were favorable to Joseph McGoldrick. McGoldrick withdrew from the race and suggested Goldstein, who was approved.

== General election ==
=== Candidates ===
- Farrell Dobbs, organizer of International Brotherhood of Teamsters and mentor to Jimmy Hoffa (Trotskyist Anti-War)
- Joseph G. Glass (Socialist)
- Jonah J. Goldstein, judge of the Court of General Sessions (Republican, Liberal, and City Fusion)
- Eric Hass, author and perennial candidate (Socialist Labor)
- Newbold Morris, president of the New York City Council (No Deal)
- William O'Dwyer, Kings County District Attorney (Democratic and American Labor)
- Max Shachtman, journalist and activist (Workers)

=== Endorsements ===
Jonah J. Goldstein

Newspapers

- New York World-Telegram

Organizations

- Citizens Union
Newbold Morris

Newspapers

- New York Post
- The New York Times
William O'Dwyer

Federal officials

- Robert F. Wagner, member of the U.S. Senate (1927–1949)
- Henry A. Wallace, 10th United States Secretary of Commerce (1945–1946)

Organizations

- American Federation of Labor
- Congress of Industrial Organizations

Notable individuals

- Sidney Hillman, labor leader
Declined to endorse

Notable individuals

- Charles Culp Burlingham, president of the New York City Bar Association
- Samuel Seabury, lawyer

=== Results ===
1945 New York City mayoral election
Party	Candidate	Votes	%	±%
Democratic	William O'Dwyer	867,426	43.76%	▼2.75
American Labor	William O'Dwyer	257,929	13.01%	▼5.82
Total	William O'Dwyer	1,125,357	56.77%	▲10.26
Republican	Jonah J. Goldstein	301,144	15.19%	▼14.45
Liberal	Jonah J. Goldstein	122,316	6.17%	N/A
City Fusion	Jonah J. Goldstein	8,141	0.41%	▼2.38
Total	Jonah J. Goldstein	431,601	21.77%	N/A
No Deal	Newbold Morris	408,348	20.60%	N/A
Socialist	Joseph G. Glass	9,304	0.47%	▼0.60
Trotskyist Anti-War	Farrell Dobbs	3,656	0.18%	N/A
Socialist Labor	Eric Hass	3,465	0.17%	N/A
Workers	Max Schachtman	585	0.03%	N/A
Write-in		45	0.00%	
Total votes		1,982,361	100.00%	

==== By borough ====
1945	Party	Manhattan	The Bronx	Brooklyn	Queens	Richmond [Staten Is.]	Total	%
William O'Dwyer	Democratic – American Labor	253,371	227,818	386,335	228,275	29,558	1,125,357	55.3%
William O'Dwyer	Democratic – American Labor	55.8%	55.3%	56.8%	61.5%	66.3%	1,125,357	55.3%
Jonah J. Goldstein	Republican – Liberal – Fusion	100,591	95,582	161,119	65,240	9,069	431,601	21.2%
Jonah J. Goldstein	Republican – Liberal – Fusion	22.2%	23.2%	23.6%	17.6%	21.8%	431,601	21.2%
Newbold Morris	No Deal	100,064	88,404	136,262	77,687	5,931	408,348	20.6%
Newbold Morris	No Deal	22.0%	21.5%	19.9%	20.9%	13.3%	408,348	20.6%
Subtotal		454,026	411,804	683,716	371,202	44,558	1,965,306	99.1%
Others							17,055	0.9%
Total							1,982,361	

== Works cited ==
- Allen, Oliver E. (1993). The Tiger: The Rise and Fall of Tammany Hall. Addison-Wesley. ISBN 9780201624632.
- Soyer, Daniel (2021). Left in the Center: The Liberal Party of New York and the Rise and Fall of American Social Democracy. Cornell University Press. ISBN 9781501759888. JSTOR 10.7591/j.ctv1hw3x50.2.
