= Bohola =

Village in County Mayo, Ireland

Bohola Both Chomhla
- Village
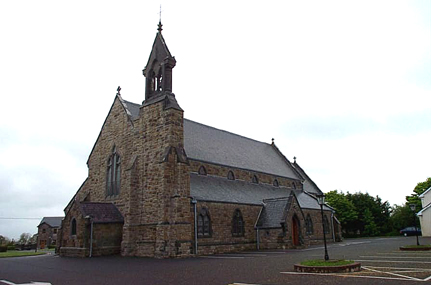
- Bohola Church

- Location in Ireland
- Coordinates: 53.902618°N 9.0558300°W
- Country: Ireland
- Province: Connacht
- County: County Mayo

Population (2016)
  - Total: 203
- Irish Grid Reference: M3065995300

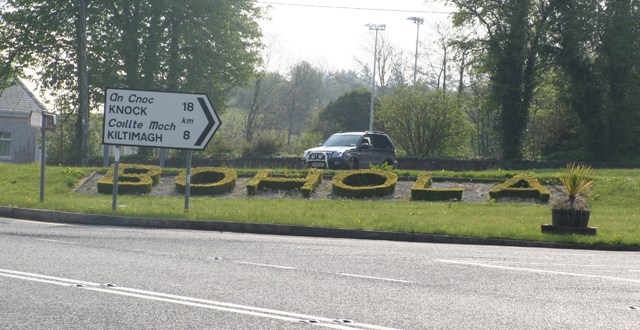
Bohala hedging welcome sign

Bohola (Irish: Both Chomhla) is a village in County Mayo, Ireland. It is 7 km north-west of Kiltimagh, by the junction of the N5 and R321 roads. The village is in the barony of Gallen and gives its name to the civil parish of Bohola. The village's amenities include two pubs, a post office, a cafe and a Catholic church.

== Sport ==
The local Gaelic football team is "Bohola Moy Davitts", an amalgamated team consisting of Straide, Foxford and Bohola. Among the team's achievements are its "Feile Doire 2010" All-Ireland title.

== Popular culture ==
Brendan Shine wrote a song called Three Pubs in Bohola. The three pubs listed in the song were MacDonald's, Clarke's and Roche's. Since the song was written, Clarke's has closed as a pub but has since reopened as the local shop and Roche's is now "The Village Inn".

== People ==
- Martin Sheridan, born in Bohola in 1881, he participated in track and field during the St. Louis, Athens and London Olympiads in the early 20th century.
- William O'Dwyer, former mayor of New York City and US ambassador to Mexico.
- Paul O'Dwyer, brother of William, a lawyer, and politician.
- Frank Durkan, civil rights attorney and nephew of the O'Dwyer brothers.
- John Mountney, Dundalk F.C. player hails from the village.

== See also ==
- List of towns and villages in Ireland
