= Frank Durkan =

Irish-American attorney

Frank Durkan (13 August 1930 – 16 November 2006) was an Irish-American attorney best known for having represented numerous members of the Provisional Irish Republican Army (IRA), including avowed IRA gun-runner George Harrison, who stood trial, and was acquitted, in 1982.

In another prominent case, which occurred the previous year, Durkan convinced a federal magistrate to deny the United Kingdom's request that Desmond Mackin - accused of shooting a British soldier- be extradited to British custody.

Born in Bohola, County Mayo, Durkan immigrated to the United States in 1947, aged 17. He stayed with his uncle, William O'Dwyer, the eldest brother of his mother, Mary. "Bill" O'Dwyer was the Mayor of New York City at the time, while his uncle, Paul O'Dwyer, was an influential activist who would later become president of the New York City Council. "The kid" was quickly whisked away to a small apartment in the Bronx to earn his way. In the meantime, he worked as a liquor store clerk, janitor and car park while being encouraged to follow in the "legal" familial footsteps.

A graduate of Columbia University, 1951, he would earn his law degree from New York Law School two years later, after which he would serve as a clerk for the law firm of O'Dwyer & Bernstein, where Paul O'Dwyer was the senior partner. He, along with Paul's son Brian, were the senior partners at the time of his death.

In addition to representing accused members of the IRA he would also practice malpractice and negligence law, and - towards the twilight of his career- indulge in political campaigns aimed at legitimizing the cause of the new IRA within American political circles by lobbying the government on behalf of Irish-American republicans and Irish nationalists; he was ultimately unsuccessful by the 1990s when a client Joe Doherty was deported in 1992 after 10 years of litigation.

He died on 16 November 2006, aged 76, in Greenwich, Connecticut from complications from RA-induced pulmonary fibrosis. He was survived by his wife, Monica, two daughters, Mary Louise and Aisling, a son-in-law, Stead, and two grandchildren, Brian and Declan.
