= Paul O'Dwyer =

American politician (1907-1998)

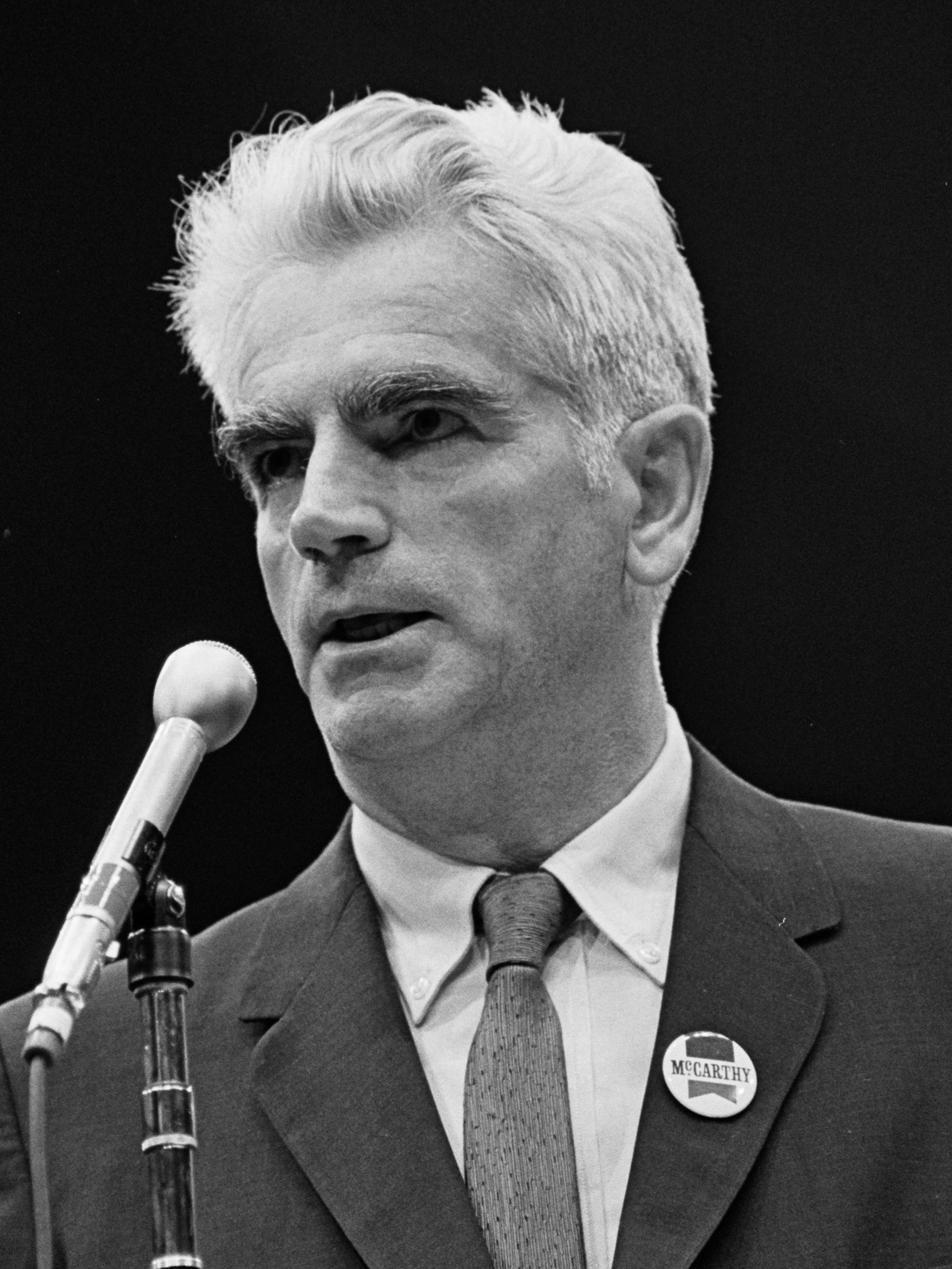
- O'Dwyer In 1968

9th President of the New York City Council
- In office January 1, 1974 – December 31, 1977
- Preceded by: Sanford Garelik
- Succeeded by: Carol Bellamy

Member of the New York City Council from the Manhattan At-Large district
- In office January 1, 1964 – December 31, 1965

Personal details
- Born: Peter Paul O'Dwyer; June 29, 1907 Bohola, County Mayo, Ireland
- Died: June 23, 1998 (aged 90) Goshen, New York, U.S.
- Party: Democratic
- Other political affiliations: American Labor Party (1948)
- Spouse(s): Kathleen Rohan; Patricia Hanrahan
- Children: Brian
- Relatives: William O'Dwyer (brother); Frank Durkan (nephew)

Peter Paul O'Dwyer (June 29, 1907 – June 23, 1998) was an Irish-born American politician and civil rights lawyer who served as President of the New York City Council during 1974–1977. He was the younger brother of Mayor William O'Dwyer, and the father of New York State Gaming Commission Chair Brian O'Dwyer.

== Early life and education ==
Paul O'Dwyer was born in Bohola, County Mayo, Ireland on June 29, 1907, and in 1925 he emigrated to Brooklyn, New York. He was educated at Fordham University and St. John's Law School, and became a United States citizen in 1931.

== Legal career ==
Active in local Irish-American organizations as a young man, O'Dwyer had a law practice in downtown Brooklyn while his brother William served as the borough's magistrate. In the late 1930s, O'Dwyer was the chairman of the Downtown Brooklyn Community Council. When his brother became Kings County District Attorney in 1940, Paul O'Dwyer moved his law practice from Brooklyn to Manhattan, saying, "I do not wish to be representing a defendant when my brother is in charge of the prosecution."

Prior to Pearl Harbor, O'Dwyer was a vehement opponent of American involvement in World War II. As chairman of the American Friends of Irish Neutrality, he traveled the United States to speak with and rally pro-neutrality (particularly Irish-American) groups.

Some of O'Dwyer's more renowned legal cases were those involving people accused of Communist activities. Active in the National Lawyers Guild, he became its president in 1947 and served on its national board from 1948 to 1951. He supported both constitutionalist and Irish republican initiatives. His influence protected several Irish Republican Army gunmen from deportation, including "The Fort Worth Five" and Vincent Conlon.

O'Dwyer's downtown Manhattan law office famously served as the resting place of the acerbic writer Dorothy Parker, whose ashes were kept in a filing cabinet there for decades.

== Political career ==
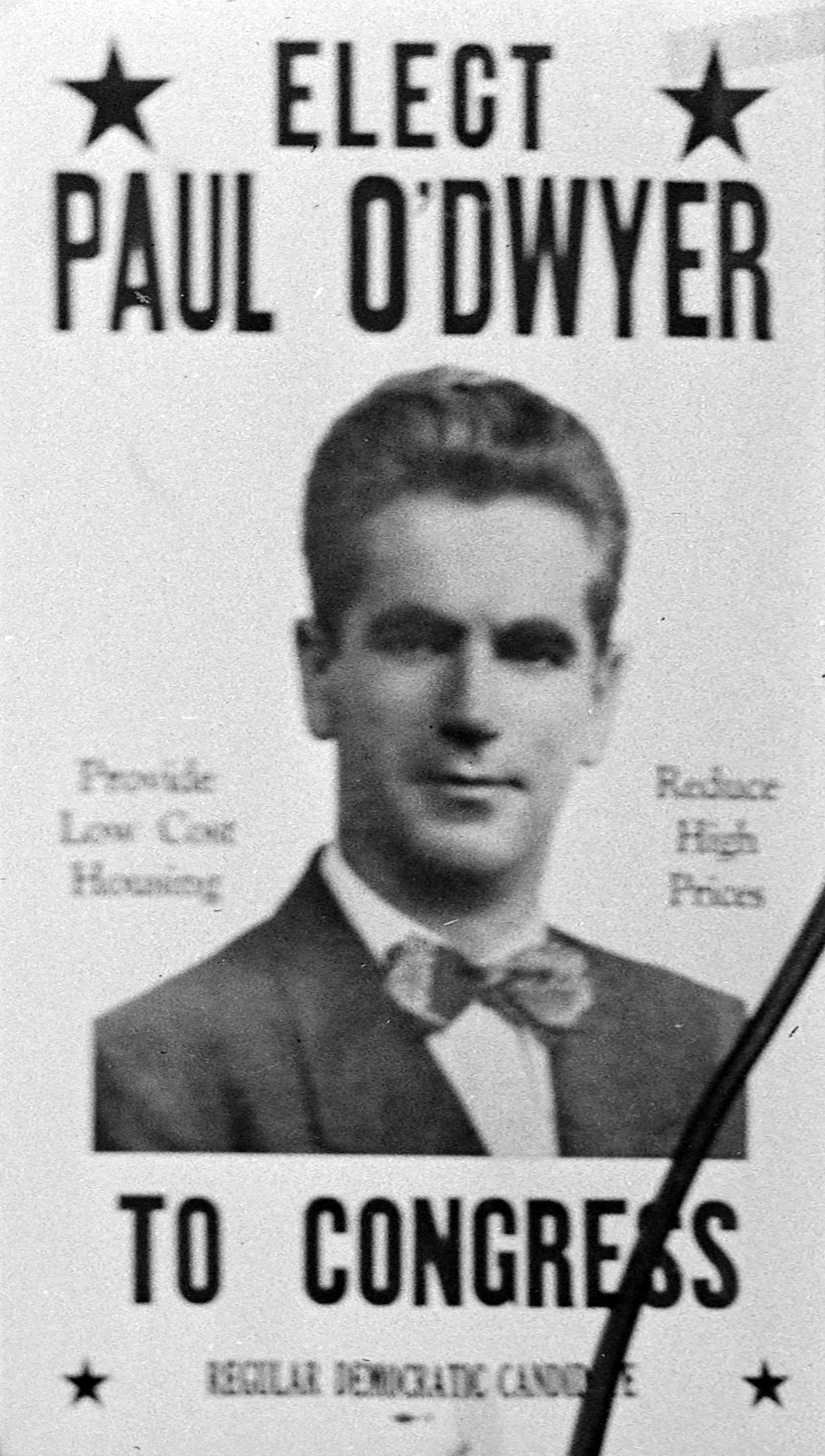
"Elect Paul O'Dwyer to Congress" campaign poster, 1948

Active in New York City politics, O'Dwyer ran for political office several times. In 1948, he was the Democratic-American Labor Party candidate for New York's 21st congressional district in Manhattan's Upper West Side, narrowly losing to Republican-Liberal incumbent Jacob K. Javits.

O'Dwyer's two general election victories took place in city elections. He was elected to the city council from an at-large seat representing all of Manhattan for a term from 1963 to 1965. In 1965, O'Dwyer ran for mayor but finished a distant fourth in the Democratic primary won by Abe Beame. In 1973, O'Dwyer won election to the position of New York City Council President, which was then one of three citywide elected positions. He served in that capacity from 1974 to 1977.

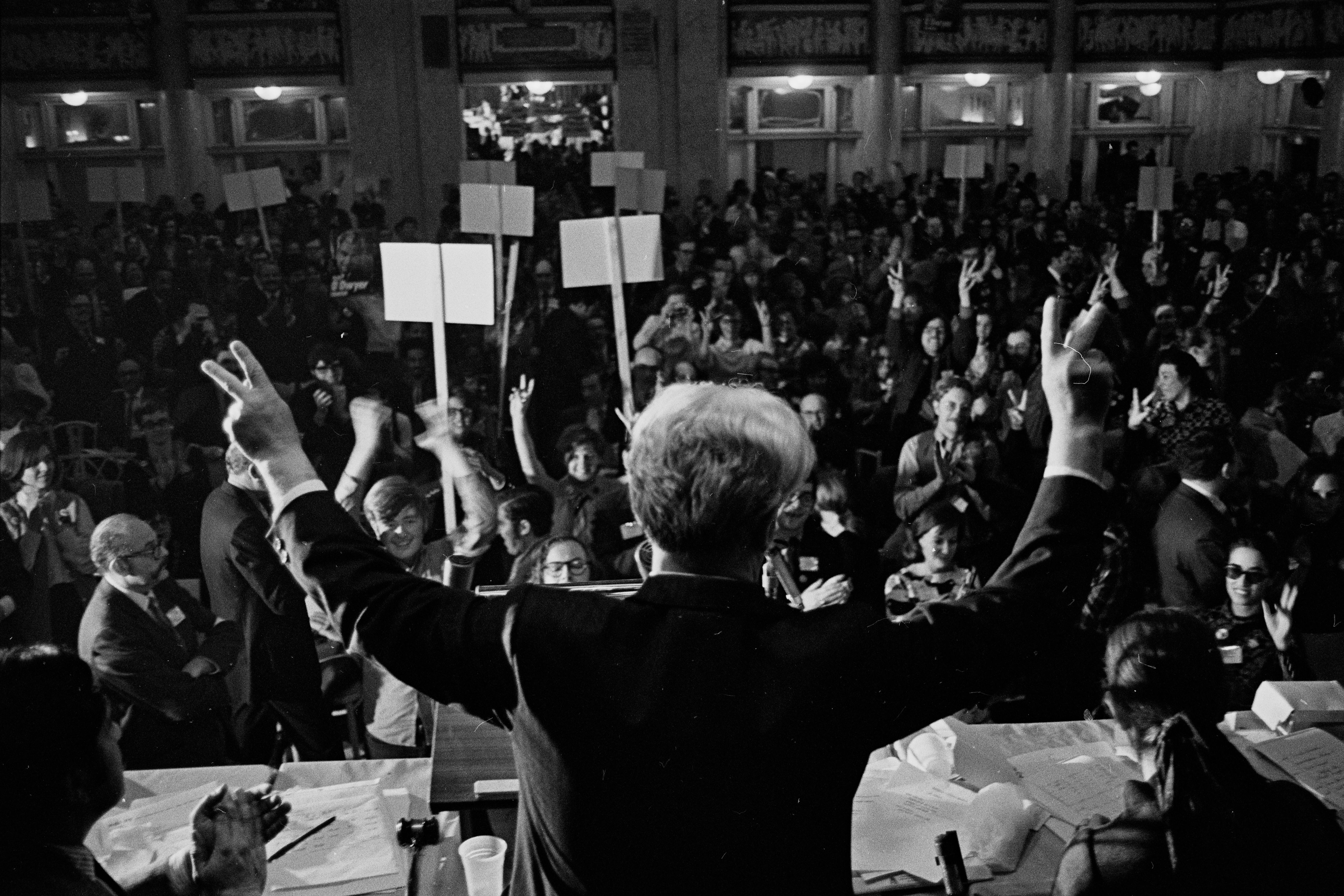
O'Dwyer accepts the nomination for U.S. Senate at the New Democratic Coalition Convention at the Hotel Diplomat in New York City, February 28, 1970

In 1968, in opposition to U.S. involvement in the Vietnam War and with the support of presidential candidate Eugene McCarthy, O'Dwyer ran in the Democratic Party primary for U.S. Senator from New York and surprised observers with an upset victory. Again he found his candidacy opposing popular Republican Party incumbent Jacob Javits and again O'Dwyer lost in the general election. In 1970, he again ran for Senate, facing Ted Sorensen, Richard Ottinger and Max McCarthy in the Democratic primary, but would finish a close second to Ottinger, who would be defeated by Conservative Party candidate James Buckley. O'Dwyer was also an unsuccessful candidate for the Democratic nomination to the U.S. Senate that was won by Daniel Patrick Moynihan in 1976, finishing in fourth in the Democratic primary behind Moynihan, Bella Abzug, and Ramsey Clark.

In 1986, Manhattan Borough President Andrew Stein appointed O'Dwyer the Manhattan Borough Historian.

== Political beliefs ==
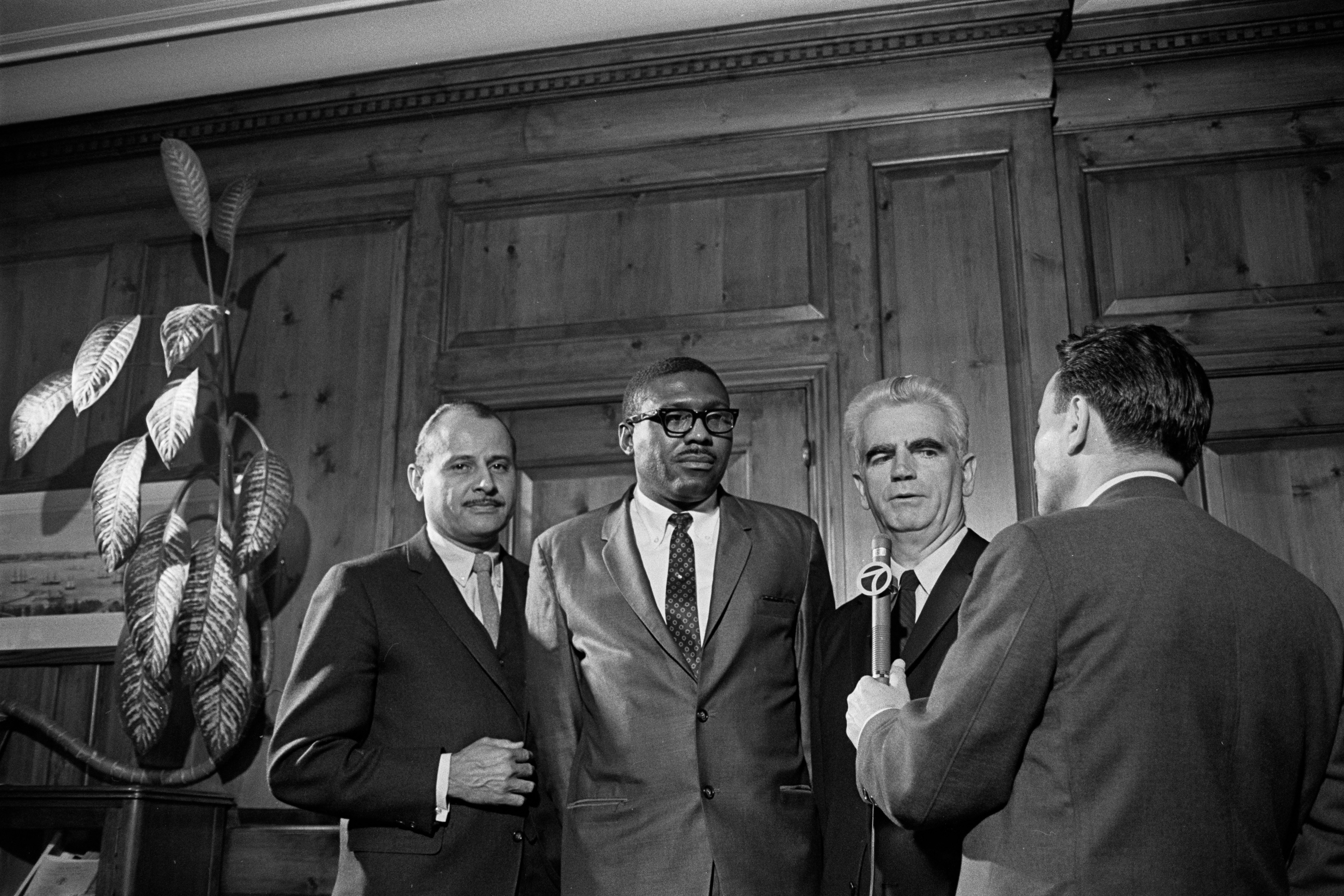
O'Dwyer (right) with Manhattan Borough President Percy Sutton (left) and Mississippi State Representative-elect Robert G. Clark Jr., December 14, 1967

O'Dwyer publicly opposed library censorship of books, defended labor union leaders and alleged anarchists, supported the left-wing American Labor Party, challenged racial segregation in New York housing and on Wall Street, fought for the creation of Israel, organized Black voters in the South, represented striking Kentucky coal miners, argued for the rights of mainland Puerto Rican voters before the U.S. Supreme Court, sued New York City to keep transit fares low, and led an April 1969 antiwar march of tens of thousands of protesters from Times Square to Central Park.

O'Dwyer supported the illegal transportation of weapons to Palestine in the 1940s and to Northern Ireland in the 1970s, and admitted knowledge of such smuggling routes. He considered the transportation of arms to be an acceptable form of smuggling and compared it to the smuggling of narcotics.

== Personal life ==
O'Dwyer was the youngest of eleven siblings. His eldest brother was New York City Mayor William O'Dwyer, who was 17 years his senior. The O'Dwyers were maternal uncles of lawyer and activist Frank Durkan. Paul was married for 45 years to Kathleen (Rohan) O'Dwyer. Their son Brian is a New York City lawyer. O'Dwyer's second wife was attorney Patricia (Hanrahan) O'Dwyer.

Paul O'Dwyer died six days before his 91st birthday in 1998.

Party political offices
| Preceded by James B. Donovan | Democratic nominee for U.S. Senator from New York (Class 3); 1968 | Succeeded by Ramsey Clark |
| Preceded by New district | New York City Council, Manhattan At-large; 1964–1965 | Succeeded by Carlos Rios |
| Preceded by Sanford Garelik | President of the New York City Council; 1974–1977 | Succeeded by Carol Bellamy |
Educational offices
| Preceded by | Manhattan Borough Historian; 1986–1990 | Succeeded by Doris Rosenblum |
