= Newbold Morris =

American politician (1902–1966)

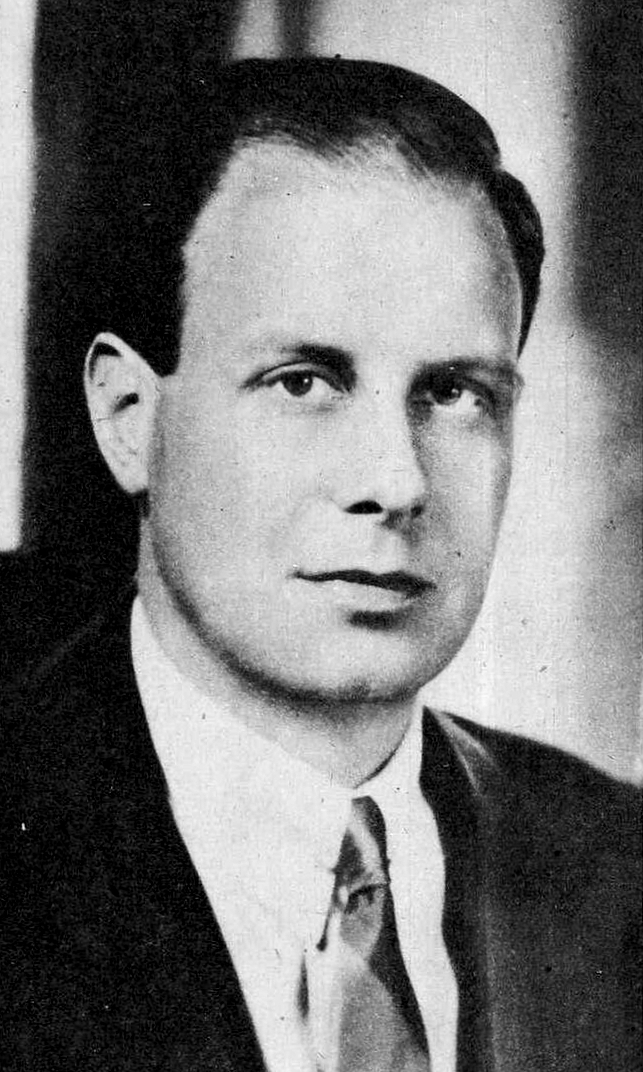
- Morris c. 1941

Parks Commissioner of New York City
- In office May 24, 1960 – January 15, 1966
- Appointed by: Robert F. Wagner Jr.
- Preceded by: Robert Moses
- Succeeded by: Thomas Hoving

1st President of the New York City Council
- In office January 1, 1938 – December 31, 1945
- Preceded by: William F. Brunner (as President of the Board of Aldermen)
- Succeeded by: Vincent R. Impellitteri

Personal details
- Born: Augustus Newbold Morris; February 2, 1902 New York City, New York, U.S.
- Died: March 30, 1966 (aged 64) New York City, New York, U.S.
- Party: Republican
- Spouses: Margaret Copley Thaw (m. 1925; div. 1940) Constance Hand (m. 1942)
- Children: 4, Richard (stepson)
- Relatives: George Morris (brother); Learned Hand (father-in-law); Augustus Newbold Morris (grandfather)
- Education: Yale University (BA, LLB)

Augustus Newbold Morris (February 2, 1902 – March 30, 1966) was an American politician, lawyer, president of the New York City Council, and two-time candidate for mayor of New York City.

== Early life ==
Morris, who never used his first name, was born in New York City. His parents were Augustus Newbold Morris (1868–1928) and Helen Schermerhorn Kingsland (1876–1956), who were married in 1896. He had two younger brothers, George Lovett Kingsland Morris (1905–1975), a painter, and Stephen Van Cortlandt Morris (1909–1984), a diplomat.

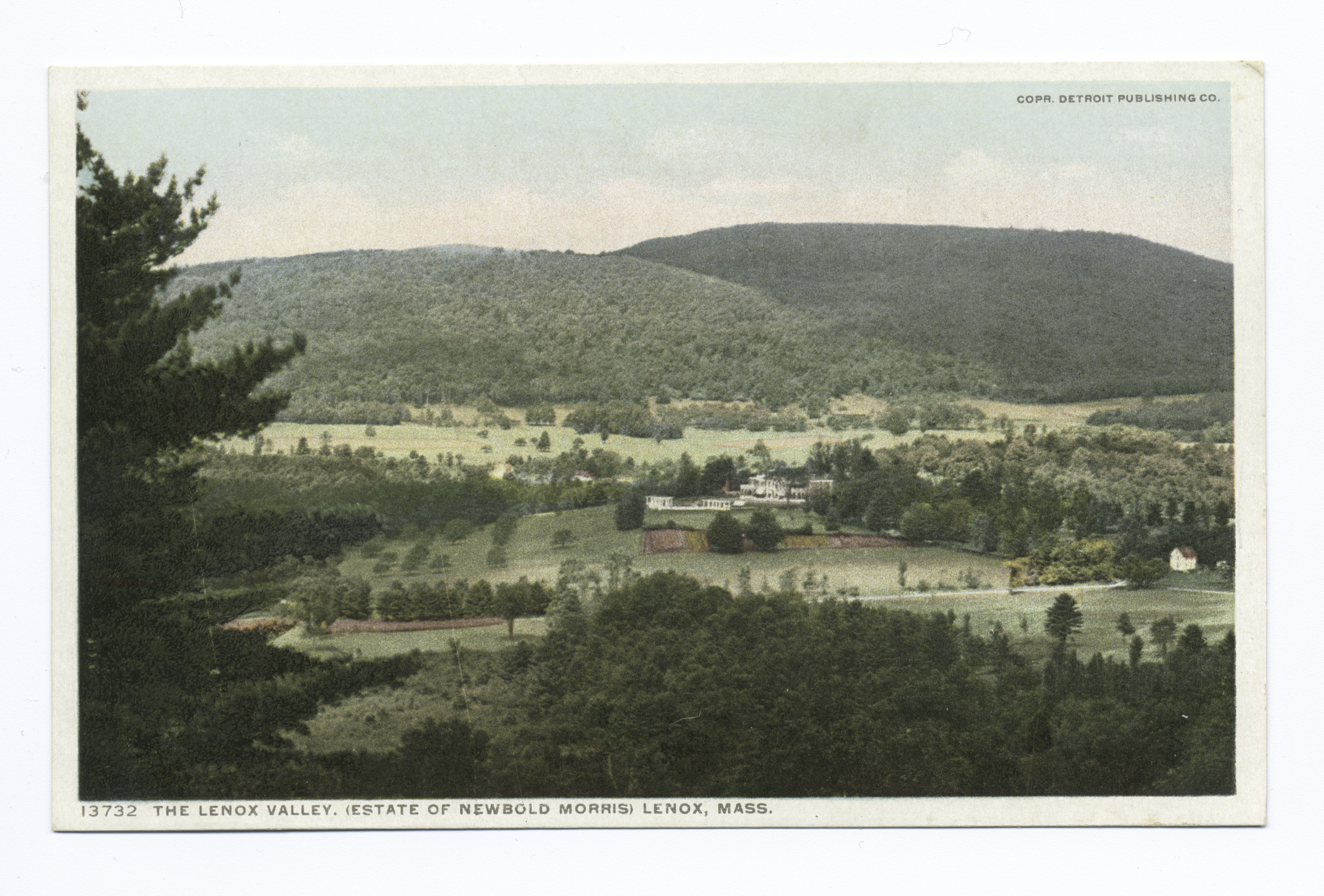
Lenox Valley Estate of Newbold Morris

His father, a cousin of the author Edith Wharton, and mother built Brookhurst in Lenox, Massachusetts, on land bought in 1906. In 1986, when the home was sold by his relatives, "it was the first single-family home in town to be sold for $1 million and it was one of the last Gilded Age cottages still occupied by the family that built it."

His paternal grandparents were Augustus Newbold Morris (1838–1906) and Eleanor Colford Jones (1841–1906). Eleanor Jones' parents were General James I. Jones (1786–1858) and Elizabeth (née Schermerhorn) Jones (1817–1874), the older sister of Caroline Schermerhorn Astor (1830–1908), also known as "The Mrs. Astor." He was descended from the prominent Colonial-era Morris family of the Morrisania section of the Bronx.

He was educated at Groton School and at Yale, where he was a member of the Scroll and Key Society.

== Career ==
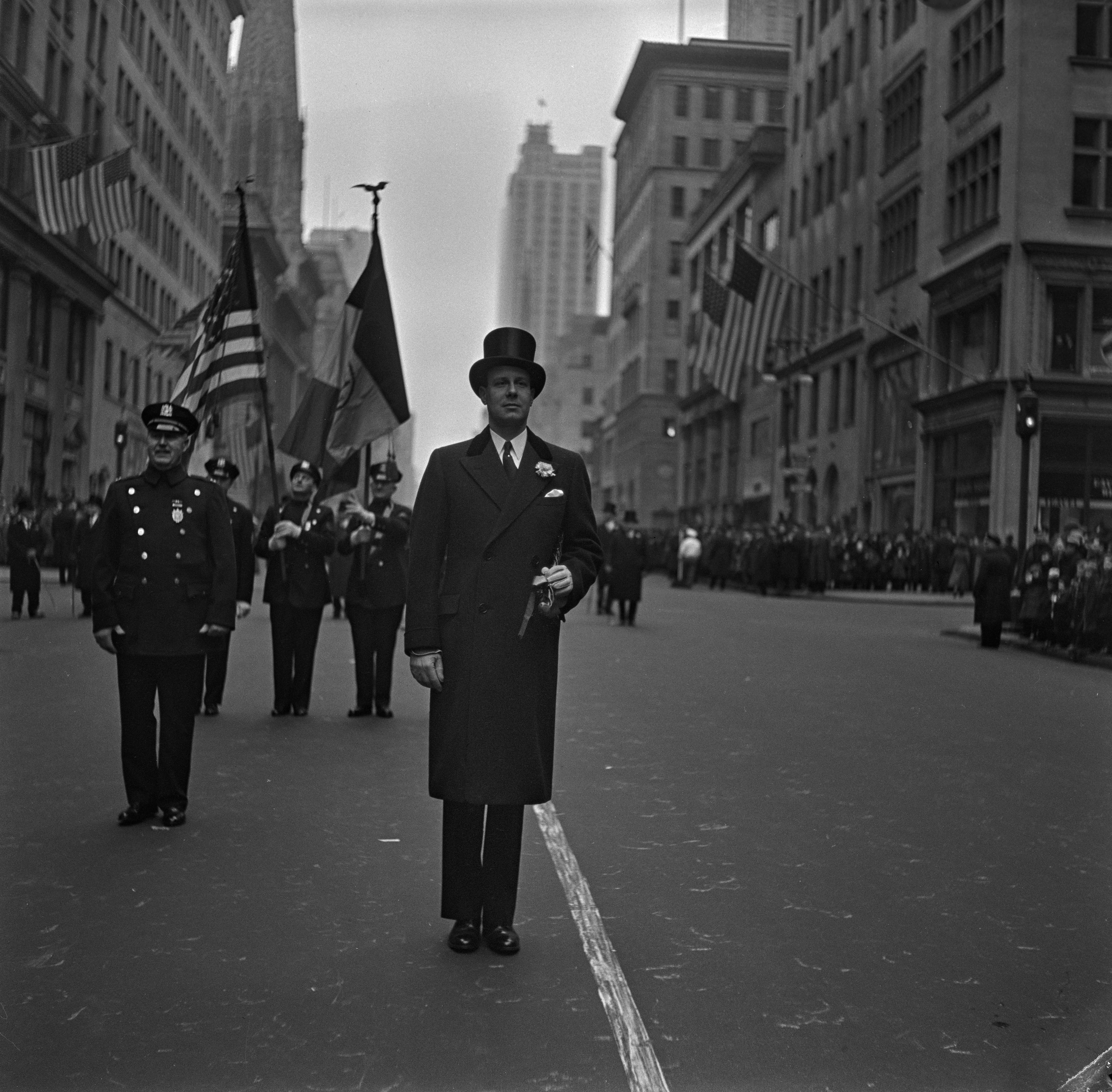
Morris at the New York City St. Patrick's Day Parade, 1938

After graduating from Yale Law School in 1928, Morris joined his father's law firm and took a seat on the Republican County Committee. By 1933 he was president of the 17th congressional district Republican club, where he met mayoral candidate Fiorello La Guardia. Morris campaigned vigorously for La Guardia and after his election was appointed an assistant corporation counsel.

Morris entered electoral politics in 1935, when he was elected to the New York City Board of Aldermen representing the Silk Stocking district. He ran unsuccessfully for president of the board in 1936, but after it was reorganized into the New York City Council the following year he was elected its president, serving from 1938 to 1945 under Mayor La Guardia.

In September 1938 he served as acting mayor of New York City while La Guardia was out on a 3 week trip through the East and West Coasts, during which the 1938 New York City truckers' strike started.

Morris ran for New York City Mayor in 1945 and in 1949. He also served on the New York City Planning Commission from 1946 to 1948. He was instrumental in founding City Center Theater in 1943 and the New York City Opera in 1944. He served as board chairman of the New York City Center until his death.

=== Special prosecutor ===
On February 1, 1952, Morris was appointed special assistant to the Attorney General by Attorney General J. Howard McGrath to investigate possible corruption in the Department of Justice. After Morris distributed a questionnaire to senior justice officials and called for unlimited access to all of McGrath's personal records, McGrath fired Morris on April 3, 1952. Morris had spent a mere 63 days in the job. A few days later Howard McGrath was forced to resign his position by President Harry Truman.

=== Park Commissioner ===
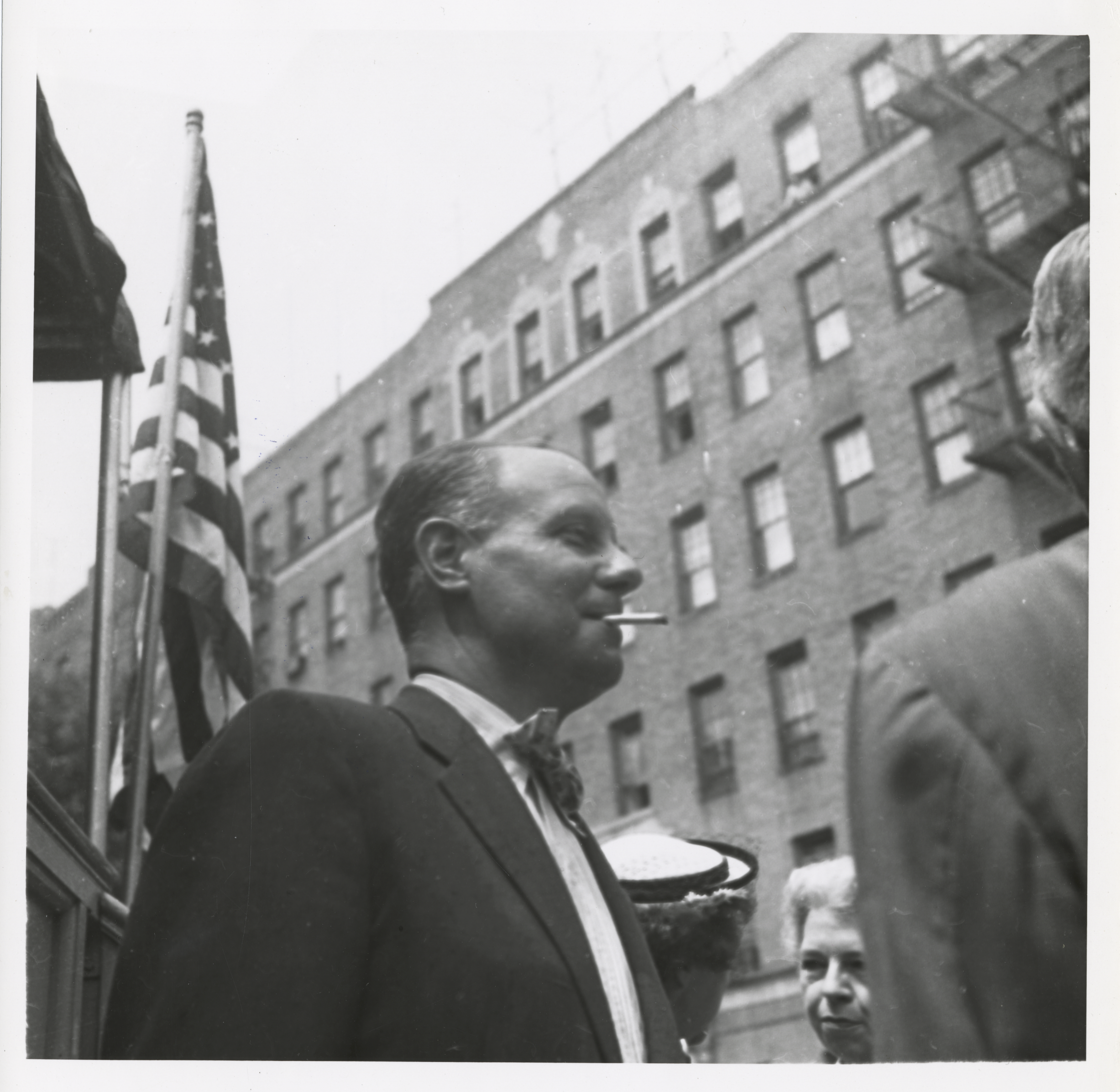
Morris in 1953

Morris was appointed Parks Commissioner of New York City by Mayor Robert F. Wagner Jr. on May 24, 1960, succeeding Robert Moses, who had served as Commissioner for an unprecedented 26 years. In this role, Morris sought to save the famous Doric columns that adorned the main entrance to Penn Station. While Morris, in this respect, served as one of the few dissenting voices during the early planning of the destruction of the first Pennsylvania Station, widely considered to have been in terms of architectural substance an irreversible and traumatic loss to the city, he ultimately failed at preventing the columns from being slated for their ultimate destruction and discarding in the New Jersey Meadowlands.

Sunday folk music was regularly played in Washington Square Park on Sundays until April 9, 1961, when Morris rejected the folkies' application for a permit with no explanation. A riot ensued with many of the folk singers being arrested by police and placed into paddy wagons. Some people suspected that local real estate interests were involved, wanting to rid the park of beatniks and other "undesirables," as some called them. But whether Morris had been influenced by such interests was never determined. The riot and arrests themselves got plenty of newspaper coverage, with one headline proclaiming "3,000 Beatniks Riot in Village." But the hysteria faded quickly.

Morris served as Commissioner until January 15, 1966, when he retired. He was replaced by Thomas P. F. Hoving.

== Personal life and death ==
In September 1925, Morris was married to Margaret Copley Thaw (1905–1980). She was the daughter of Josiah Copley Thaw (1874–1944) and granddaughter of William Thaw Sr. and Mary Sibbet Copley. Before their divorce in 1940, they had two sons together:

- Peter Van Courtlandt Morris (b. 1931), who married Carlotta Marie Noel, daughter of Auguste L. Noel (d. 1964) and Theodora (née Winslow) Noel, in 1960. He is a pianist and composer.
- Newbold Morris (b. 1933), a member of the U.S. Marine Corps in 1966.

After their divorce in 1940, his first wife remarried in 1949 to Harry William Seckel.

On August 1, 1942, Morris married Constance (née Hand) Jordan (1909–2008), youngest daughter of renowned American judge Learned Hand. She was divorced from Lt. Robert Jordan and the mother to actor Richard Jordan (1937–1993) and Constance Jordan. The wedding ceremony was performed by Mayor La Guardia in Gracie Mansion. Together, they were the parents of:

- Lewis Morris (b. 1944), a doctoral candidate at the University of Pennsylvania in 1966.
- Frances Morris (b. 1947), a student at Barnard College in 1966.

He died of cancer in New York City on March 30, 1966, two months after his term as Commissioner ended. He left an estate worth more than $1,000,000.

Morris was 6-feet-5-inches tall.

=== Descendants ===
Through his son Peter, he was the grandfather of Theodora Winslow Morris, a doctoral candidate at Yeshiva University, who married Jack Francis Marran, who worked for his family's oil distribution company in Patchogue, New York, in 1991.

Political offices
New office	President of the New York City Council; 1938–1945	Succeeded by Vincent R. Impellitteri
Party political offices
Preceded by Jonah J. Goldstein	Republican nominee for Mayor of New York City; 1949	Succeeded by Edward Corsi
