= 1949 New York City mayoral election =

- November 8, 1949
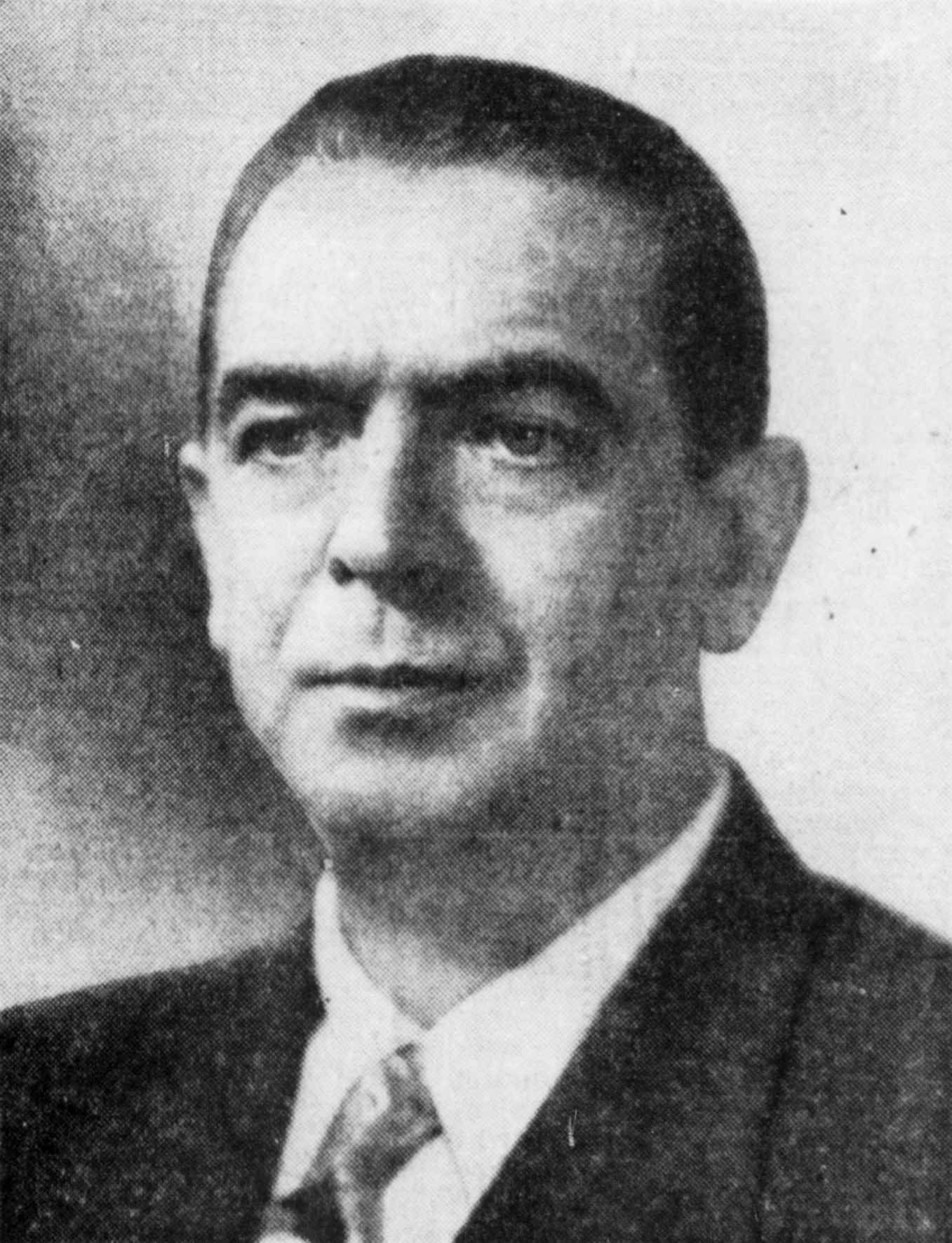

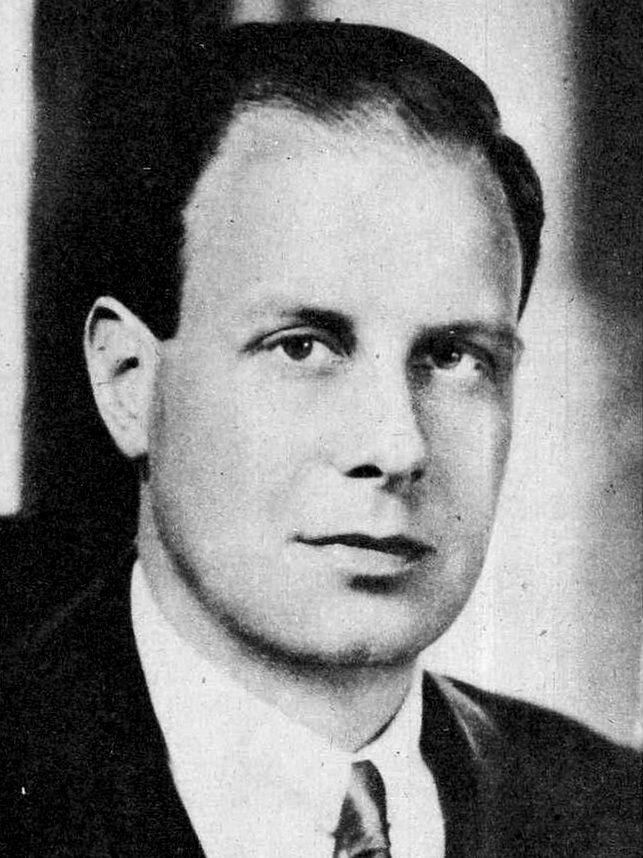

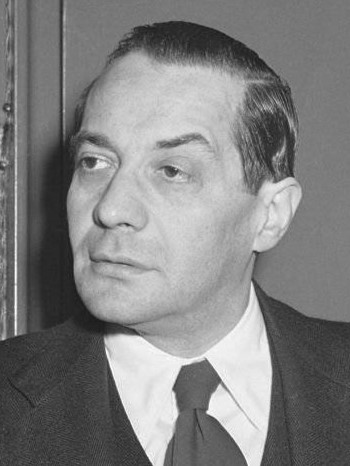
Candidate	William O'Dwyer	Newbold Morris	Vito Marcantonio
Party	Democratic	Republican	American Labor
Alliance		Liberal
Popular vote	1,264,600	956,170	356,423
Percentage	48.7%	37.1%	13.8%
- Borough results O'Dwyer: 40–50% 50–60% 60–70%
Mayor before election
William O'Dwyer
Democratic
Elected mayor
William O'Dwyer
Democratic

The New York City mayoral election of 1949 took place on November 8, 1949, in New York City. The candidates were incumbent Mayor William O'Dwyer, a Democrat, and former City Council President and 1945 mayoral candidate Newbold Morris, a Republican, as well as other, third-party candidates. Morris was also the nominee of the Liberal Party, and additionally ran on the City Fusion ballot line.

O'Dwyer won the contest with 48.87% of the vote.

== Republican primary ==
Governor Thomas Dewey distrusted Newbold Morris, but the Republican Party nominated him. Morris supported Franklin D. Roosevelt in the 1944 election and was a member of the Americans for Democratic Action. The Liberal Party of New York also nominated Morris. U.S. Representative Jacob Javits managed Morris' campaign.

== General election ==
=== Candidates ===
- Vito Marcantonio, U.S. Representative from East Harlem (American Labor)
- Newbold Morris, former President of the New York City Council (Republican and Liberal)
- William O'Dwyer, incumbent mayor since 1946 (Democratic)

=== Endorsements ===
O'Dwyer endorsements

Federal officials

- Franklin D. Roosevelt Jr., member of the U.S. House of Representatives from New York's 20th congressional district (1949–1955)
- Harry S. Truman, 33rd President of the United States (1945–1953)

Notable individuals

- Luigi Antonini, vice president of the International Ladies Garment Workers Union
- Joseph P. Lash, activist
- Eleanor Roosevelt, First Lady of the United States (1933–1945)
- Max Zaritsky, labor leader
Morris endorsements

Organizations

- Americans for Democratic Action
- Citizens Union
- International Ladies Garment Workers Union

Notable individuals

- Mary McLeod Bethune, civil rights activist
- Guy Brewer, civil rights activist
- Rose Schneiderman, labor activist
- Channing Heggie Tobias, civil rights activist
Marcantonio endorsements

Notable individuals

- Henry A. Wallace, 33rd Vice President of the United States
- Paul Robeson, performer and activist

=== Results ===
Morris received 200,000 fewer votes than John Foster Dulles, the Republican nominee in the concurrent senatorial election. It is believed that those voters supported O'Dwyer due to how liberal Morris was. This was the first time that the Liberals received more votes than the ALP in a city-wide election.

1949 New York City mayoral election
Party	Candidate	Votes	%	±%
Democratic	William O'Dwyer (incumbent)	1,254,600	48.68%	▼8.09 (▲4.92)
Republican	Newbold Morris	571,071	22.16%	▲6.97
Liberal	Newbold Morris	372,281	14.45%	▲8.38
City Fusion	Newbold Morris	12,818	0.50%	▲0.09
Total	Newbold Morris	956,170	37.10%	▲16.50
American Labor	Vito Marcantonio	356,423	13.83%	▲0.72
Total votes		2,577,193	100.00%	

==== By Borough ====
1949	Party	Manhattan	The Bronx	Brooklyn	Queens	Richmond [Staten Is.]	Total	%
William O'Dwyer	Democratic	278,343	254,014	425,225	270,062	38,868	1,266,512	48.9%
William O'Dwyer	Democratic	44.8%	48.7%	48.8%	53.4%	64.5%	1,266,512	48.9%
Newbold Morris	Republican – Liberal – Fusion	219,430	185,248	332,433	200,552	18,406	956,069	36.9%
Newbold Morris	Republican – Liberal – Fusion	35.3%	35.5%	38.2%	39.7%	30.6%	956,069	36.9%
Vito Marcantonio	American Labor	123,128	82,386	113,478	34,677	2,957	356,626	13.8%
Vito Marcantonio	American Labor	19.8%	15.8%	13.0%	6.9%	4.9%	356,626	13.8%
Subtotal		620,901	521,648	871,136	505,291	60,231	2,579,207	99.6%
Others							12,477	0.4%
Total							2,591,684	

== Works cited ==
- Soyer, Daniel (2012). "'Support the Fair Deal in the Nation; Abolish the Raw Deal in the City': The Liberal Party in 1949". New York History. 93 (2). Cornell University Press: 147–81. JSTOR 23645398.
