= Court of general sessions =

Judicial courts in British American colonies

A court of general sessions was a type of court originally established as a colonial court of quarter sessions in the British North American colonies. Some of these courts continued in some form after Canada and the United States became independent countries.

These courts initially had general jurisdiction over both civil and criminal matters.

== New York ==
In New York, the Court of Quarter Sessions was established on October 17, 1683, by the first Assembly in New York. It had jurisdiction over both civil and criminal matters until 1691, when it was restricted to felony crimes not punishable by death or life imprisonment. The court was abolished in all counties of New York except New York County (now Manhattan) by the New York Constitution of 1846. In New York County, the Court of General Sessions continued until 1962 when its scope devolved to the New York Supreme Court (a trial-level court of general jurisdiction not to be confused with the highest court of the New York system, which is called the New York Court of Appeals). At the time when it was abolished, the Court of General Sessions of New York County was the oldest criminal court in the United States.

== Pennsylvania ==
In Pennsylvania, the courts of general sessions in continued until the constitution of that Commonwealth was rewritten in 1968 and the courts' jurisdiction was placed under the pre-existing Courts of Common Pleas in each county.

== South Carolina ==
The Court of General Sessions in South Carolina originally served the entire colony and met in Charles Town. It had the same justices as the Court of Common Pleas, and it dealt with criminal cases. Some records of the court date from 1671. An act in 1785 established courts in every county. The current South Carolina Circuit Court has two divisions – the civil division, called the Court of Common Pleas, and the criminal division, called the Court of General Sessions.

== Washington, D.C. ==
The District of Columbia has a court called the Court of General Sessions. It is part of the Superior Court of the District of Columbia. However, it dates only as far back as 1963, when Congress converted the Municipal Court to the Court of General Sessions. It was combined with other courts into the Superior Court in 1970.
