= Ira J. Palestin =

American liberal politician

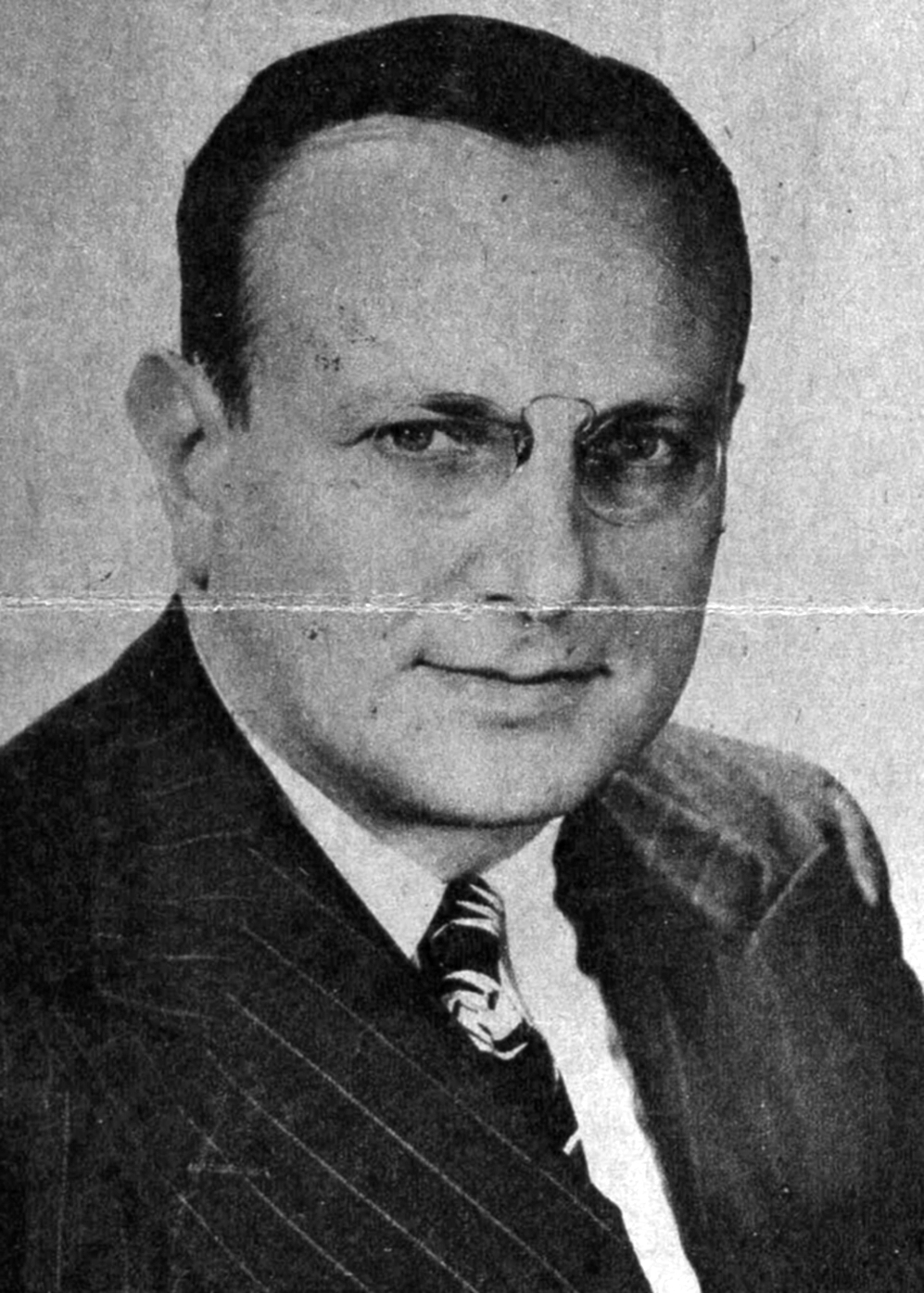
- Palestin c. 1945

Member of the New York City Council from The Bronx at-large
- In office January 1, 1946 – December 31, 1949
- Preceded by: Multi-member district
- Succeeded by: Constituency abolished

Personal details
- Born: Ira Jacob Palestin; September 4, 1899 New York City, U.S.
- Died: April 30, 1997 (aged 97)
- Resting place: Westchester Hills Cemetery
- Party: American Labor (before 1944); Liberal (after 1944)
- Spouse: Beatrice Kleban (m. 1928)
- Education: City College of New York; Columbia Law School
- Occupation: Lawyer, politician

Military service
- Allegiance: United States
- Battles/wars: World War I

Ira Jacob Palestin (September 4, 1899 – April 30, 1997) was an American Labor and Liberal Party lawyer and politician who served on the New York City Council from 1946 to 1949, representing the Bronx. When Palestin was elected in 1945 alongside Louis P. Goldberg, they became the first elected officials of the Liberal Party of New York.

== Biography ==
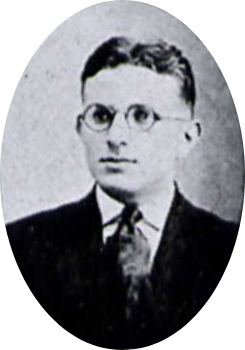
Palestin's City College of New York yearbook photo, 1919

Born in New York City in 1899, Palestin served in World War I and attended the City College of New York and Columbia Law School. He was admitted to the New York State Bar in 1924 and practiced law for over 20 years. During World War II, he served as a volunteer appeals attorney for the Office of Price Administration.

Palestin's first encounter with electoral politics came in 1943, when he was nominated for State Supreme Court by the American Labor Party. He declined the nomination as he felt he wasn't prominent enough for the candidacy. Two years later, he ran for City Council in the Bronx on the Liberal Party ticket and was elected to a four-year term. He was aided by the city's electoral system of proportional representation, rising from eighth place to fifth as ballots from fellow Liberal Howard C. Cadwell and Independent Gertrude W. Klein transferred to him as they were eliminated. He was an unsuccessful candidate for Congress in 1946, and for Bronx Borough President in 1949 and 1953.

In 1955, Palestin was appointed to the New York State Tax Commission by Governor W. Averell Harriman, serving until 1966, when he resigned to re-enter law practice.
