= William O'Dwyer =

Irish-American politician and diplomat (1890–1964)

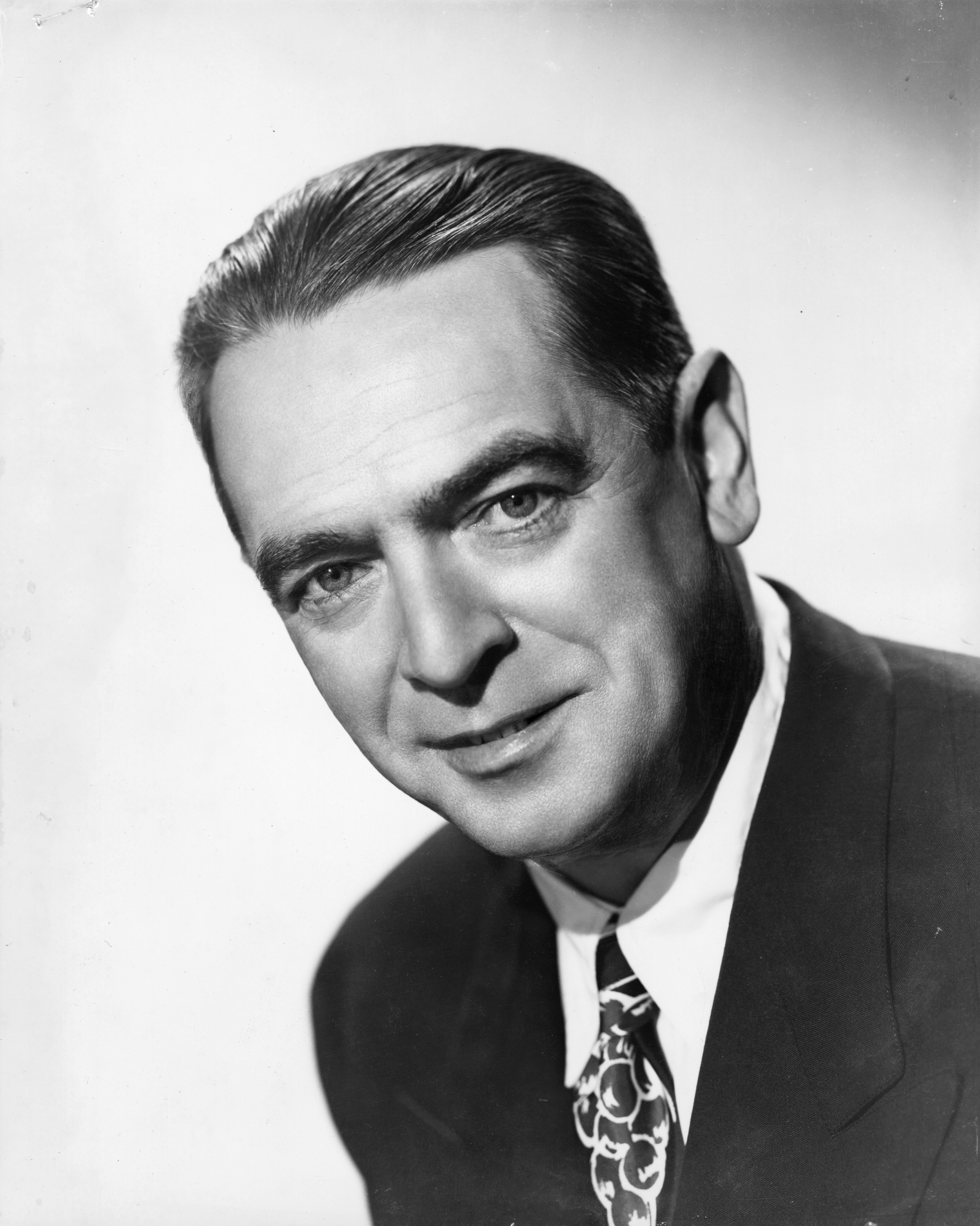
- O'Dwyer in 1945

United States Ambassador to Mexico
- In office November 23, 1950 – December 6, 1952
- President: Harry S. Truman
- Preceded by: Walter C. Thurston
- Succeeded by: Francis White

101st Mayor of New York City
- In office January 1, 1946 – August 31, 1950
- Preceded by: Fiorello H. La Guardia
- Succeeded by: Vincent R. Impellitteri

Kings County District Attorney
- In office January 1, 1940 – August 1, 1945
- Preceded by: William F.X. Geoghan
- Succeeded by: George J. Beldock

Personal details
- Born: July 11, 1890 Bohola, County Mayo, Ireland
- Died: November 24, 1964 (aged 74) New York City, U.S.
- Party: Democratic
- Spouses: Catherine Lenihan (m. 1916; died 1946); Sloan Simpson (m. 1949; div. 1953)
- Relations: Paul O'Dwyer (brother); Brian O'Dwyer (nephew); Frank Durkan (nephew)
- Education: Fordham University Law School
- Profession: Attorney

Military service
- Allegiance: United States
- Branch/service: United States Army
- Years of service: 1942–1945
- Rank: Brigadier General
- Battles/wars: World War II
- Awards: Legion of Merit

William O'Dwyer (July 11, 1890 – November 24, 1964) was an Irish-American attorney and Democratic Party politician who served as the 101st Mayor of New York City from 1946 to 1950, when he resigned under the cloud of multiple investigations into corruption in the New York City Police Department. He also served as Brooklyn District Attorney from 1940 to 1945 and United States Ambassador to Mexico from 1950 to 1952.

== Early life ==
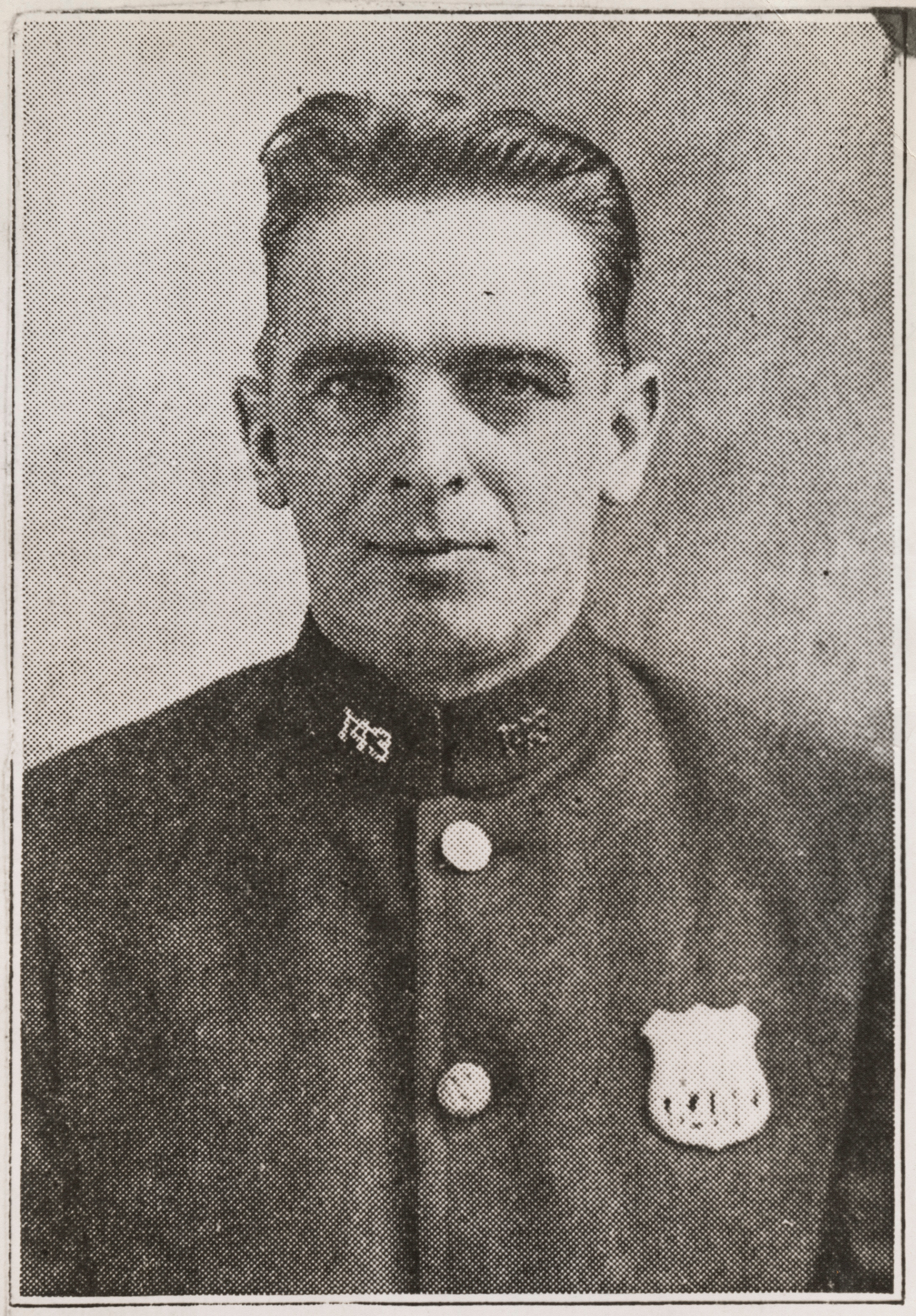
O'Dwyer as a member of the New York City Police Department c. 1917–1924

O'Dwyer was born in Bohola, County Mayo, Ireland and studied at St. Nathys College, Ballaghaderreen, County Roscommon. In 1907, O'Dwyer began to study for the priesthood at the Pontifical University of Salamanca, a Jesuit seminary in Spain, where he became fluent in Spanish. He later decided not to join the clergy, and emigrated to the United States in 1910. He sailed to New York as a steerage passenger on board the liner Philadelphia and was inspected at Ellis Island on June 27, 1910.

O'Dwyer first worked as a laborer, then as a New York City police officer, while studying law at night at Fordham University Law School. He received his degree in 1923 and then built up a successful practice before serving as a Kings County (Brooklyn) Court judge. He won election as the Kings County District Attorney in November 1939 and his prosecution of the organized crime syndicate known as Murder, Inc. made him a national celebrity.

After losing the mayoral election to Fiorello La Guardia in 1941, O'Dwyer joined the United States Army for World War II, achieving the rank of brigadier general as a member of the Allied Commission for Italy and executive director of the War Refugee Board, for which he received the Legion of Merit. During that time, he was on leave from his elected position as district attorney and replaced by his chief assistant, Thomas Cradock Hughes, and was re-elected in November 1943.

== Mayor of New York City ==
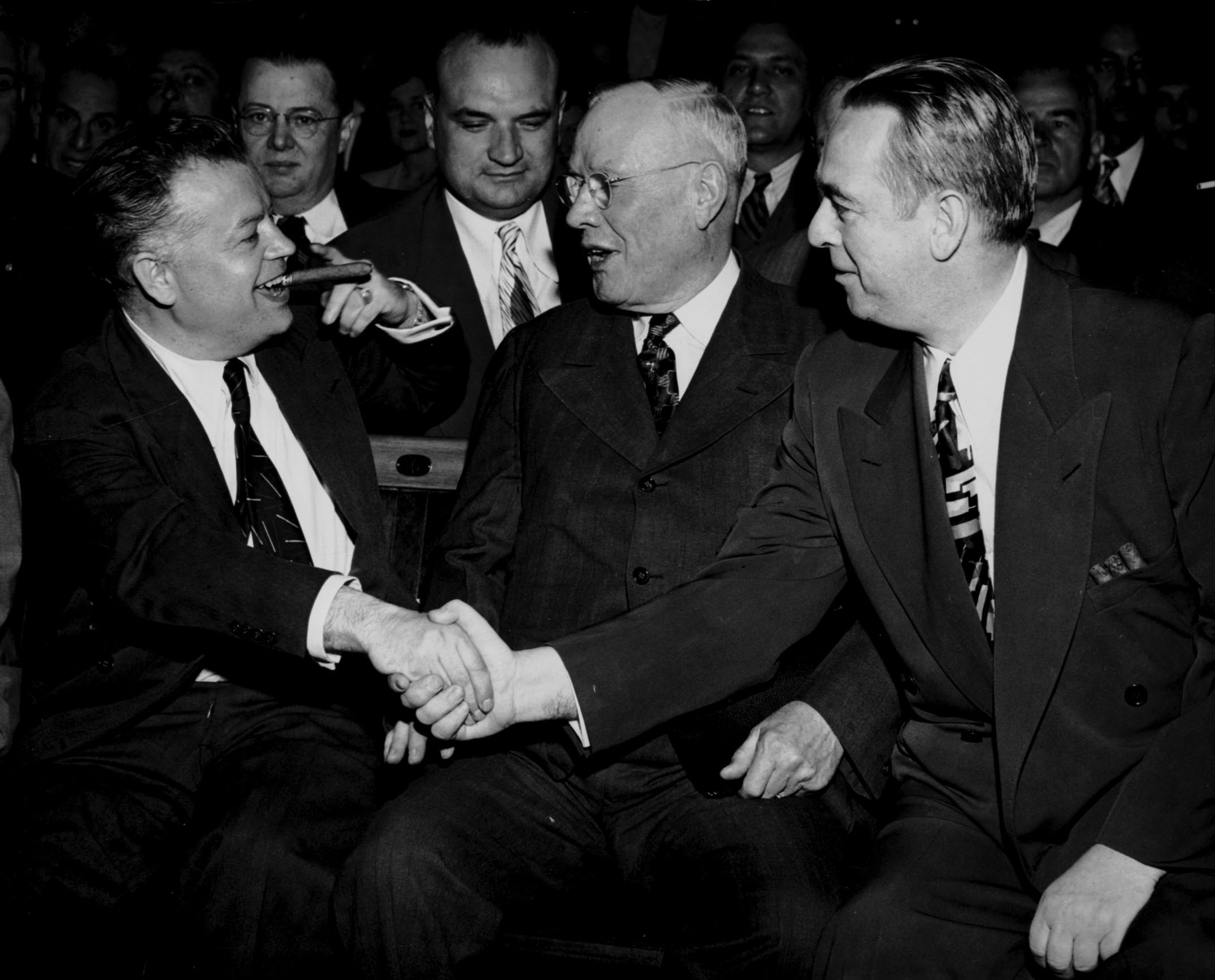
O'Dwyer (right) shakes hands with International Ladies Garment Workers Union President David Dubinsky (left) as American Federation of Labor President William Green looks on, 1947

In 1945, O'Dwyer received the support of Tammany Hall leader Edward V. Loughlin, won the Democratic nomination, and then easily won the mayoral election. At his inauguration, O'Dwyer celebrated to the song, "It's a Great Day for the Irish", and addressed the 700 people gathered in Council Chambers at City Hall: "It is our high purpose to devote our whole time, our whole energy to do good work...." He established the Office of City Construction Coordinator, appointing Park Commissioner Robert Moses to the post, worked to have the permanent home of the United Nations located in Manhattan, presided over the first billion-dollar New York City budget, created a traffic department and raised the subway fare from five cents to ten cents. In 1948, O'Dwyer received The Hundred Year Association of New York's Gold Medal Award "in recognition of outstanding contributions to the City of New York." In 1948, he received the epithets "Whirling Willie" and "Flip-Flop Willie" from U.S. Representative Vito Marcantonio of the opposition American Labor Party while the latter was campaigning for Henry A. Wallace.

Shortly after his re-election to the mayoralty in 1949, O'Dwyer was confronted with a police corruption scandal uncovered by the Kings County District Attorney, Miles McDonald. O'Dwyer resigned from office on August 31, 1950. Upon his resignation, he was given a ticker tape parade up Broadway's Canyon of Heroes in the borough of Manhattan. President Harry Truman appointed him U.S. Ambassador to Mexico. He returned to New York City in 1951 to answer questions concerning his association with organized crime figures and the accusations followed him for the rest of his life. He resigned as ambassador on December 6, 1952, but remained in Mexico until 1960.

He helped organize the first Israel Day Parade, along with New York's Jewish community.

== Death ==
O'Dwyer died in New York City on November 24, 1964, in Beth Israel Hospital, aged 74, from heart failure. His funeral mass was held at St. Patrick's Cathedral on November 27, and he was interred at Arlington National Cemetery, Section 2, Grave 889-A-RH.

== Family ==
In 1916, O'Dwyer married Catherine Lenihan, whom he met while he was working as a bartender at the Vanderbilt Hotel and she was employed as one of the Vanderbilt's telephone switchboard operators. They had no children, and she was in ill health for many years before her death in 1946. Her funeral was originally planned for St. Joseph's Church in the Yorkville neighborhood of Manhattan, where she and her husband were members. The large number of attendees resulted in a move to St. Patrick's Cathedral, where the service was presided over by Cardinal Francis Spellman.

On December 20, 1949, O'Dwyer married Elizabeth Sloan Simpson at St. Joseph's Catholic Church in Stuart, Florida. They divorced in 1953, but remained close, and Simpson attended O'Dwyer's funeral in 1964.

His brother Paul O'Dwyer served as President of the City Council from 1973 to 1977, and his nephew Brian O'Dwyer was appointed chair of the New York State Gaming Commission in 2022.

== See also ==
- List of mayors of New York City
- New York City tugboat strike of 1946

Legal offices
Preceded by William F.X. Geoghan	Kings County District Attorney; 1940–1945	Succeeded by George J. Beldock
Party political offices
Preceded by Jeremiah T. Mahoney	Democratic Nominee for Mayor of New York City; 1941, 1945, 1949	Succeeded by Ferdinand Pecora
Political offices
Preceded by Fiorello H. La Guardia	Mayor of New York City; 1946–1950	Succeeded by Vincent R. Impellitteri
Diplomatic posts
Preceded by Walter C. Thurston	United States Ambassador to Mexico; 1950–1952	Succeeded by Francis White
