= Jonah J. Goldstein =

American judge (1886–1967)

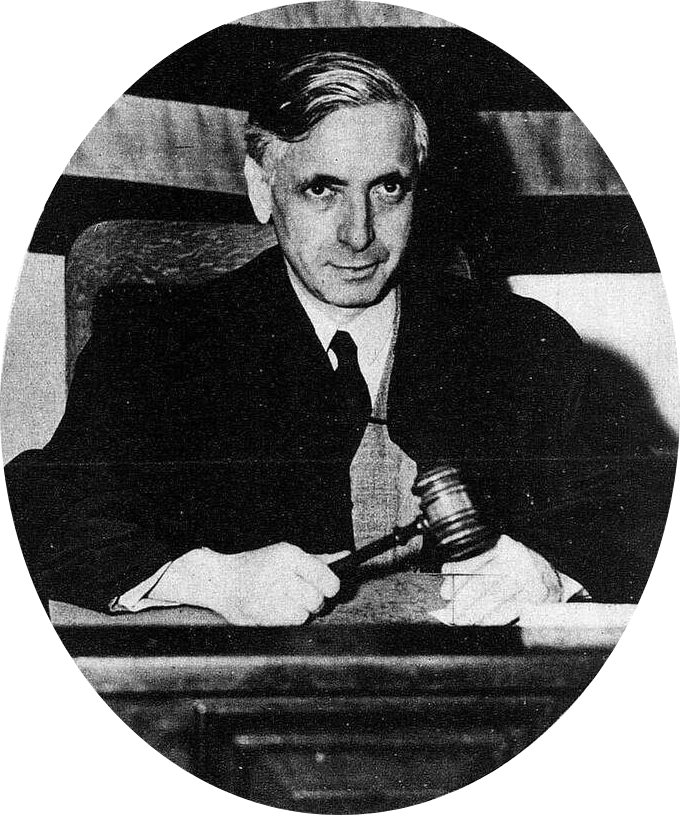
- Jonah J. Goldstein
- Born: April 6, 1886; Ontario, Canada
- Died: July 22, 1967 (aged 81); Bethlehem, New Hampshire, U.S.
- Occupations: Attorney, judge
- Political party: Republican

Jonah Jamison Goldstein (April 6, 1886 – July 22, 1967) was a Republican General Sessions Judge from New York, and the Republican candidate for Mayor of New York City in the 1945 election, losing to William O'Dwyer. He died in 1967, in Bethlehem, New Hampshire.

Goldstein was Jewish, and he served on several Jewish institutions and was active in many New York welfare activities. He also served as president of the Grand Street Boys Association.
