= Louis P. Goldberg =

American socialist politician

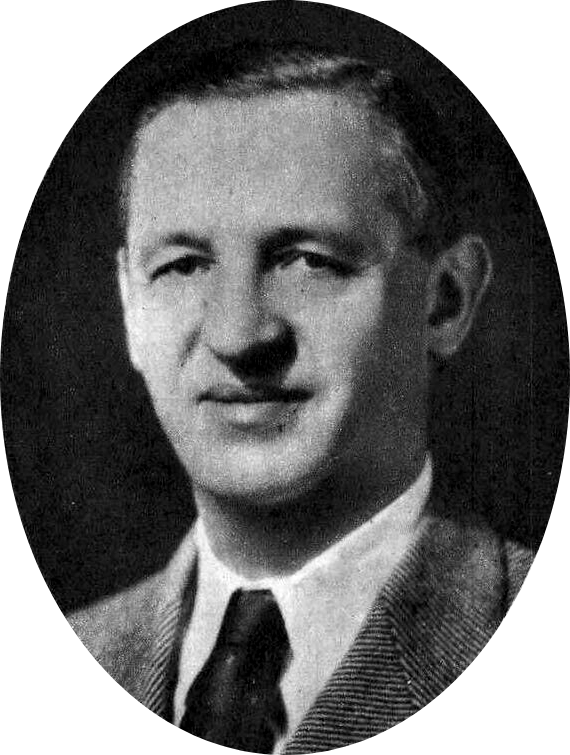
- Goldberg c. 1943

Member of the New York City Council from Brooklyn At-Large
- In office January 1, 1946 – December 31, 1949
- Preceded by: Multi-member district
- Succeeded by: Constituency abolished
- In office January 1, 1942 – December 31, 1943
- Preceded by: Multi-member district
- Succeeded by: Multi-member district

Personal details
- Born: Louis Palatnik Goldberg; February 15, 1889 Russian Empire
- Died: December 11, 1957 (aged 68) New York City, U.S.
- Party: Socialist (before 1936); American Labor (1936–1944); Liberal (after 1944)
- Other political affiliations: Social Democratic Federation (1936–1957)
- Spouse: Eleanore Levenson (m. 1926)
- Children: Karl
- Occupation: Lawyer, politician

Louis Palatnik Goldberg (February 15, 1889 – December 11, 1957) was a Russian-born Jewish-American Socialist, American Labor and Liberal Party lawyer and politician who served on the New York City Council from 1942 to 1943 and again from 1946 to 1949, representing Brooklyn. When Goldberg was re-elected in 1945 alongside Ira J. Palestin, they became the first elected officials of the Liberal Party of New York.

== Biography ==
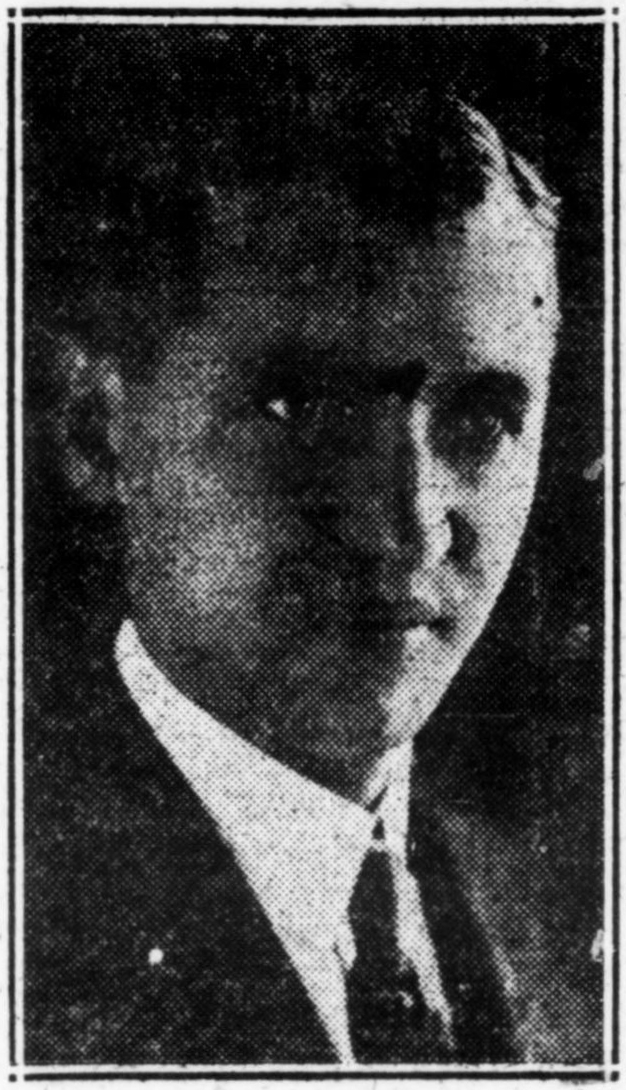
Goldberg as a candidate for State Assembly, 1924

Goldberg was a frequent candidate for public office on the Socialist Party ticket; between 1919 and 1935, he ran for State Supreme Court seven times, for State Assembly four times, for Municipal Court twice, and for Kings County Surrogate once.

Goldberg was a member of the Old Guard faction of the Socialist Party that split away in 1936 to form the Social Democratic Federation. He rose to become national chairman of the SDF and played a key role in its reunification with the SPA in 1957.

Goldberg married Eleanore Levenson, a fellow Socialist, with whom he wrote Lawless Judges, a book detailing how Supreme Court justices used their power to restrict the rights of labor and minorities.

Goldberg died on December 11, 1957, in Lebanon Hospital in the Bronx, New York.

== Works ==
- Lawless Judges. New York: Rand School Press, 1935.
