= Sanford Garelik =

American politician

Sanford D. Garelik

8th President of the New York City Council
- In office January 1, 1970 – December 31, 1973
- Preceded by: Francis X. Smith
- Succeeded by: Paul O'Dwyer

Personal details
- Born: August 16, 1918 The Bronx, New York, New York
- Died: November 19, 2011 (aged 93) Manhattan, New York, New York
- Party: Democratic
- Other political affiliations: Liberal (1969); Republican (1969)

Sanford Daniel Garelik (August 16, 1918 – November 19, 2011) was an American politician from New York City. Garelik also served as the first Jewish chief inspector of the New York Police Department.

Born in the Bronx, Garelik served on the New York City Council and was president of the council 1970–1973. He unsuccessfully ran for Mayor of New York City in 1973.

He was also personally thanked by Ed Sullivan at the end of the show in which the Beatles first performed in the U.S.

Garelik died in Manhattan on November 19, 2011, at the age of 93.

Political offices
Preceded by Francis X. Smith	President of the New York City Council; 1970–1973	Succeeded by Paul O'Dwyer
