= Liberal Party of New York =

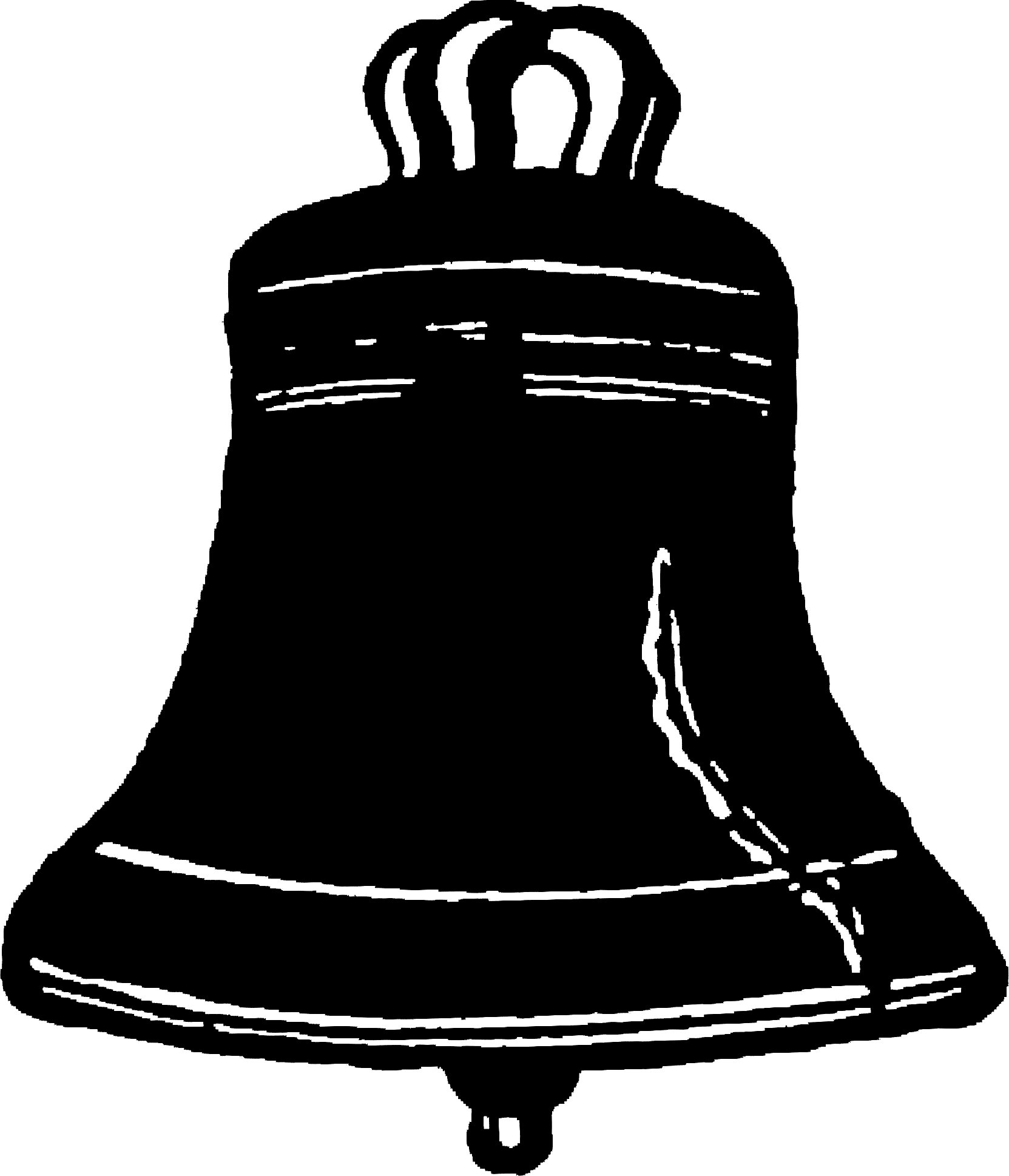
- Chairperson: Vacant
- Spokesperson: Martin I. Hassner
- Founder: George Counts
- Founded: 1944; 82 years ago
- Split from: American Labor Party
- Headquarters: New York City, NY, U.S.
- Ideology: Social liberalism
- Colors: Green, red
- New York State Assembly: 0 / 150
- New York State Senate: 0 / 63
- New York City Council: 0 / 51

Website
- www.liberalparty.org

The Liberal Party of New York is a political party in New York. Its platform supports a standard set of socially liberal policies, including abortion rights, increased spending on education, and universal health care.

After 2002, the Liberal Party was largely replaced by the New York Working Families Party.

== History ==
=== Creation ===
Members of the Communist Party USA started joining the American Labor Party and Israel Amter, chair of the Communist Party, called for the "building of the American Labor Party". Although its constitution specifically barred Communists from the organization, there was no enforcement for this provision and large numbers flocked to registration as ALP members from the Communist-led United Electrical Workers, Transport Workers, and State, County, and Municipal Workers. Communists in the ALP opposed reelecting Roosevelt in the 1940 presidential election and the party's leadership started an attempt to remove them from the party. The party condemned the Molotov–Ribbentrop Pact. Fights broke out at the party's convention, where Roosevelt was given the nomination despite an attempted resolution condemning Roosevelt.

Sidney Hillman, a member of the left-wing, threatened to have the Amalgamated Clothing Workers of America become involved in the 1944 state committee elections if the party's leadership voted against a proposal to increase union control over the party. The right-wing rejected it. Adolf A. Berle and Eleanor Roosevelt supported the party's right-wing while Franklin Roosevelt wanted to avoid conflict between the factions. Fiorello La Guardia proposed a compromise in which the state executive committee would be divided between the factions and no communist would be on the election slate. Hillman accepted the proposal, but David Dubinsky rejected it. The left-wing won 620 of the 750 committee seats.

1,124 delegates attended the convention from May 19 to 20, 1944, where Franklin D. Roosevelt was given the presidential nomination. Many of the leaders of the Liberal Party were former members of the Socialist Party of America and American Labor Party. Paul Blanshard, August Claessens, and Harry W. Laidler were among the founders. John L. Childs was selected to serve as the party's chair. The party was given $50,000 by the International Ladies Garment Workers Union and spent $200,000 during the 1944 election, three times what the ALP spent. The party had 150 union affiliates by 1948. Alex Rose was one of the strongest leaders in the party until his death in 1976. Raymond Harding succeeded Rose as chair and served until 2002.

=== Rise ===
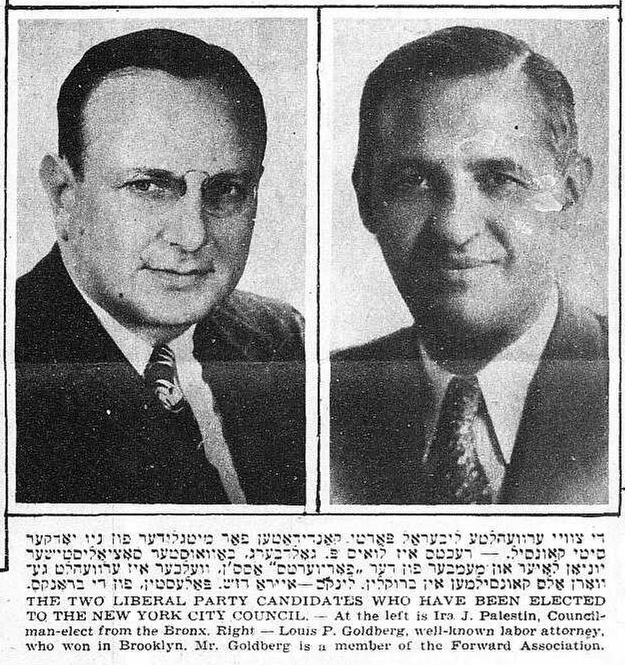
Clipping from The Jewish Daily Forward celebrating the elections of Ira J. Palestin and Louis P. Goldberg to the New York City Council, November 25, 1945.

The Liberals attempted to give their mayoral nomination to Wendell Willkie, but he died and they instead nominated Jonah J. Goldstein. Dubinsky stated that the "national third party project died" with Willkie. Berle replaced Childs as the party's chair in 1947. He did not support the creation of a national party and was more supportive of the Democrats. The party was a member of A. Philip Randolph's National Educational Committee for a New Party from 1945 to 1947. Louis P. Goldberg and Ira J. Palestin were elected to the New York City Council in the 1945 election, becoming the first elected Liberals. The party supported James M. Mead and Herbert H. Lehman in the 1946 gubernatorial and senatorial elections, but both lost and less than 180,000 people voted on the Liberal line compared to over 400,000 votes on the ALP line. The party received enough votes in the gubernatorial election to become a recognized party.

In 1947, the Liberal, Communist, ALP, Socialist, and other third parties successfully opposed legislation to increase the threshold to become a recognized party, but the Liberals supported the Wilson Pakula act, which was opposed by the Communists and ALP. The Liberals unsuccessfully opposed the referendum to end the usage of proportional representation for city council elections in New York City. The Liberals lost their seats on the New York City council after the end of proportional representation.

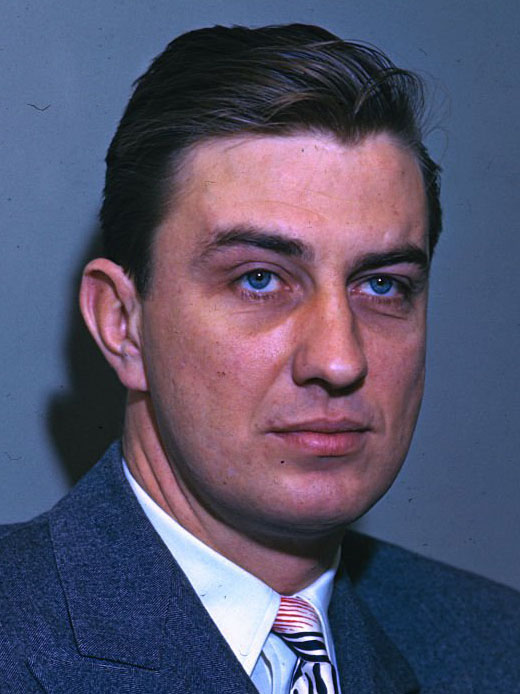
Franklin D. Roosevelt Jr. was elected to the United States House of Representatives on the Liberal ballot line in a 1949 special election. Roosevelt later served as the party's gubernatorial nominee in the 1966 election.

The Liberals supported Henry A. Wallace's cabinet appointment causing The Wall Street Journal to accuse the ALP and Liberals of grooming him for a presidential run in the 1948 election. However, Liberal opinion soured on Wallace with Dubinsky calling him a "darling of the fellow travelers" and Berle calling him the front man for Communists. In March 1947, the Liberal Party Policy Committee called for a presidential campaign by Dwight D. Eisenhower. The passage of Hubert Humphrey's pro-civil rights plank at the 1948 Democratic National Convention was one of the main reasons the Liberals endorsed Harry S. Truman on September 1, 1948. Franklin D. Roosevelt Jr. was elected to the U.S. House of Representatives mainly with the Liberal nomination, and the Four Freedoms Party ballot line obtained with the aid of the Liberals, in 1949.

The 1949 New York City mayoral election was the first time that the Liberals received more votes than the ALP in a city-wide election. Berle, Dubinsky, and Rose pushed for Herbert H. Lehman to seek the Democratic nomination in the 1949 U.S. Senate election and the number of votes he received on the Liberal ballot line was greater than his margin of victory. Lehman received more votes on the Liberal ballot line than the ALP candidate in the 1950 U.S. Senate election and the Liberals aided in ALP member Vito Marcantonio lose reelection. The Liberals replaced the ALP, the "shoddy tool of Moscow" according to Ben Davidson, as Row C on the ballot. The ALP lost its ballot access after the 1954 gubernatorial election and dissolved in 1956. A special election for New York City council president was held in 1951 to fill the vacancy created by Vincent R. Impellitteri ascending to the mayoralty. The party saw this as a chance to elect their first citywide official, but considered running a fusion campaign with Newbold Morris or Jacob Javits. The Liberals nominated Rudolph Halley on the condition that he would not accept the Democratic nomination. Halley won the election.

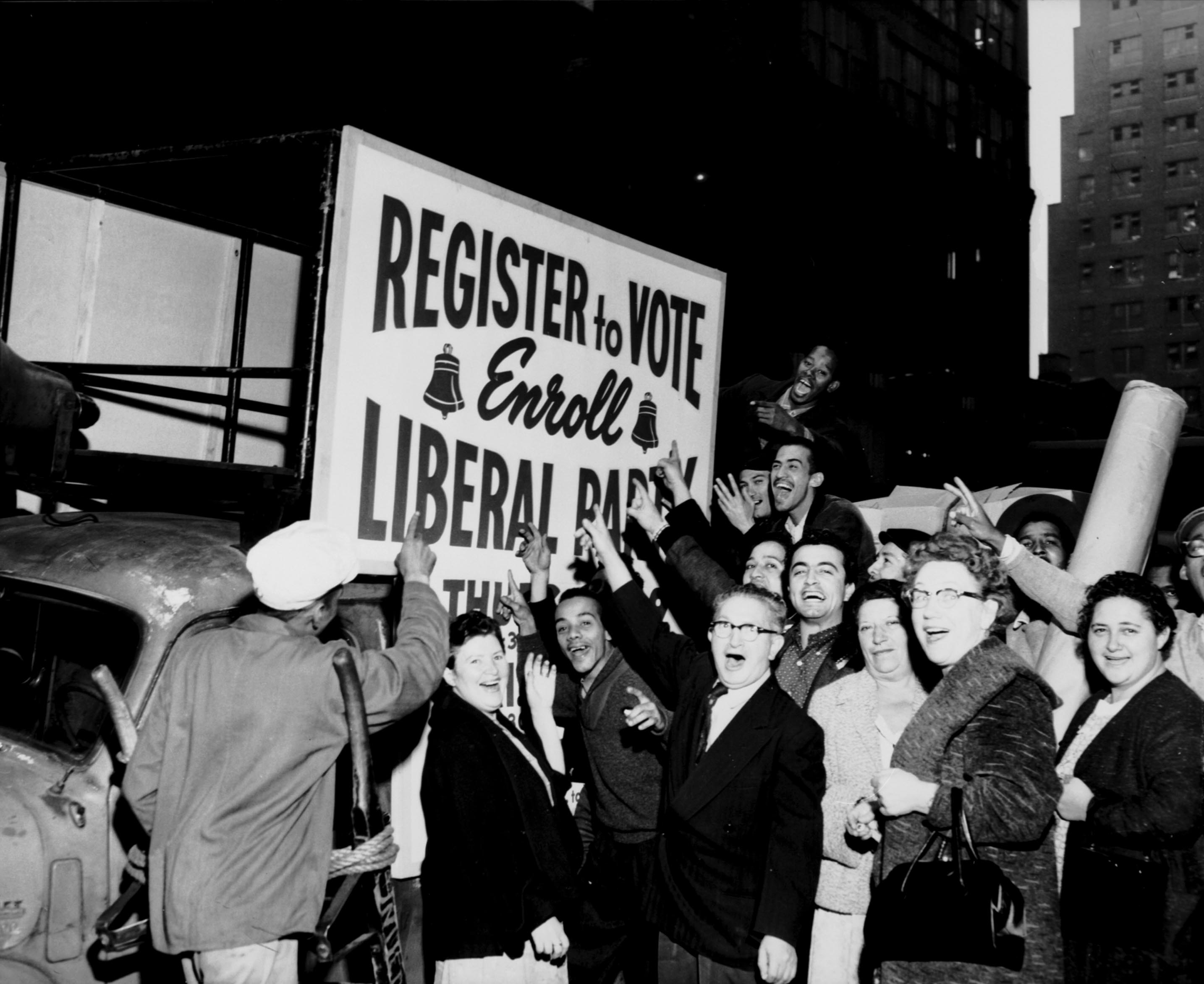
A cheering group of people point to a campaign banner that reads, "Register to Vote, Enroll Liberal Party."

The party was divided on who to support for the Democratic presidential nomination during the 1952 presidential election. Berle supported U.S. Senator Paul Douglas while other party members supported Estes Kefauver, W. Averell Harriman, or Adlai Stevenson II. Stevenson's nomination "delighted" the Liberals according to Davidson. The party opposed John Sparkman's selection as Stevenson's running mate and Dubinsky threatened to withhold the party's nomination from Stevenson. However, Berle, Dubinsky, and Rose later argued in favor of endorsing the ticket due to them not having any other candidates. In the concurrent senatorial election the party opposed Democratic nominee John Cashmore and instead ran George Counts as their own candidate.

Berle's tenure as chair ended in July 1955, and Counts was selected to replace him. Counts stepped down in April 1959, and Paul R. Hays became acting chair before being elected chair in 1960. During the 1956 election, Rose helped convince Kefauver to end his campaign for the Democratic presidential nomination. The party supported Kefauver's vice-presidential nomination bid and opposed John F. Kennedy. The Liberals endorsed the Stevenson and Kefauver presidential ticket on September 11. Vincent Corsall was elected mayor of Oswego solely with the Liberal nomination in 1957, but lost reelection in 1959. The party attempted to recruit Thurgood Marshall to run against Adam Clayton Powell Jr. in the 1958 U.S. House election, but he declined.

=== Zenith ===
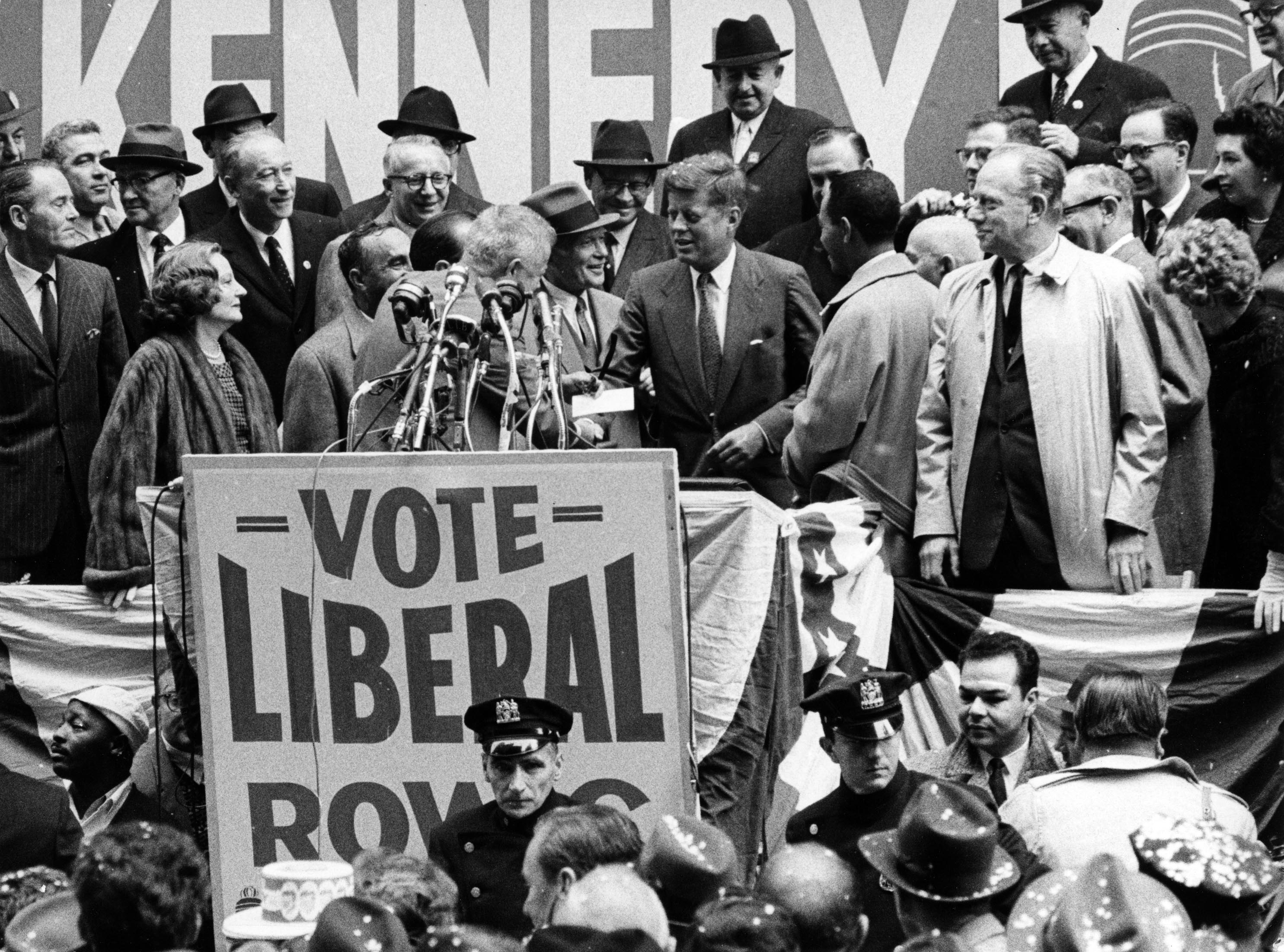
Liberal Party rally in support of John F. Kennedy for president, 1960. Party leader David Dubinsky is at the podium.

In 1960, the Liberal Party endorsed Kennedy for president. On September 14, 1960, he accepted the nomination, giving almost a 20-minute speech defending American Liberalism and his campaign. Here he also gave a famous quote about liberalism, stating "I'm proud to say I'm a Liberal." The Conservative Party of New York State was formed in 1962, and saw the Liberals as a model to follow. The party wanted to pressure the Republicans further to the right and opposed Nelson Rockefeller and Javits, both of whom had been nominated by the Liberals in the past. The 1962 gubernatorial election was the worst performance for the Liberals at that point. The party aided Robert F. Kennedy in gaining the Democratic senatorial nomination in the 1964 election and also gave him their ballot line. Kennedy won the election, but only received around 70,000 more votes than the Conservative ballot line.

The party gave its nomination to Republican nominee John Lindsay in the 1965 New York City mayoral election, despite opposition from members like Luigi Antonini, in exchange for one-third of the mayoral appointments, money for the Liberal campaign, and a citywide Liberal candidate. The Liberals pressured President Lyndon B. Johnson to not become involved in the election and Dubinsky wrote to him about how the ALP endorsed both Roosevelt and La Guardia. Johnson gave his endorsement to the Democratic mayoral nominee late in the election. The Liberals spent $300,000 during the campaign and the number of votes Lindsay received on their ballot line was greater than his margin of victory. Timothy Costello, the party's chair, was given the position of deputy mayor in Lindsay's administration. Costello resigned as chair in order to take this position and was replaced by Donald S. Harrington.

During the 1966 gubernatorial election, Roosevelt lobbied the party's leadership for their nomination for months. Dubinsky "broke out the 20-year-old scotch" during a meeting according Roosevelt's friends. Dubinsky argued for supporting Roosevelt using polls showing him receiving at least one-fourth of the vote. Louis Stulberg and other leaders of the ILGWU opposed Roosevelt due to him not staying with the party after the 1949 election. Roosevelt won the party's nomination. Murray Kempton stated that the convention was under the thumb of "comrade secretary" Davidson, who chaired the convention. Harrington was selected as the lieutenant gubernatorial nominee. Roosevelt received the highest number of votes for any Liberal gubernatorial nominee in history. However, the Liberals received less votes than the Conservatives and fell from Row C to Row D.

The party was divided during the 1968 Democratic primary as Costello and multiple upstate county chairs supported Eugene McCarthy while Stulberg and the ILGWU supported Johnson. The pro-Johnson elements of the party switched their support to Humphrey after Johnson dropped out. The party voted to endorse Humphrey on September 4. The first statewide primary in the party's history occurred during the 1968 U.S. Senate election. Rose wanted the party to endorse Javits, who they helped elect to the U.S. House in 1946, as he could easily gain them votes and they did not have control over who the Democratic nominee would be. However, left-wingers in the party were critical of Javits' stance on Vietnam and support for Richard Nixon. Stulberg believed that supporting Javits would help Nixon win the presidential election. Percy Sutton contested the nomination, but withdrew after the state committee made Javits the party's nominee. The ILGWU put Murray Baron onto the primary ballot, but Javits defeated him.

The ILGWU made a push to reform the party after the 1966 election. They wanted to reduce his power over the party. 25–30% of the party's budget came from the ILGWU, but started reducing its support in protest of Rose. The ILGWU voted to disaffiliate from the Liberals in January 1969. ILGWU accused the party of being a "tail on the Republican kite" and was critical of Lindsay's mayoralty. Lindsay ran for reelection in the 1969 New York City mayoral election, but lost the Republican primary. He was given the Liberal nomination prior to the primary and continued his campaign as their nominee. Lindsay won reelection and four Liberals were elected to the city council. This was the first time they won seats on the city council since 1949. Rose and the Liberals became a major part of Lindsay's administration in his second term. The Liberals, as the official minority party in the city council, had additional patronage possibilities. Clingan was selected to be their caucus leader. Liberals for New Politics, a group seeking to reform the party, was formed by Clingan and city councilor Charles Taylor. They ran Paul Siminoff for chair against Rose in 1970, but Rose was reelected. Clingan and Taylor later left the party to join the Democrats.

=== Decline ===
Arthur Goldberg, a friend of Rose, won the Democratic gubernatorial nomination in the 1970 election. Harrington and Costello were nominated as place holder candidates for governor and senator. Liberals for New Politics accused Rose of using them to gain more time to make a political deal. Goldberg appealed to the Liberals in a nine page letter to Harrington while Rockefeller sought to have Harrington run, where he would serve as a spoiler candidate. Goldberg was given the gubernatorial nomination while Charles Goodell was given the senatorial nomination. Both of them lost their elections, with Goodell coming third behind Conservative nominee James L. Buckley. The number of votes cast on the party's ballot line declined by almost 60% between the 1968 and 1972 presidential elections while Conservatives received twice as many votes.

Rose told Lindsay to not seek reelection in the 1973 election. Rose, Javits, and Rockefeller organized a meeting to attempt a Liberal and Republican fusion campaign. Rose wanted Javits to run, but he declined. Rose and Rockefeller supported Robert F. Wagner Jr. and the Liberal Policy Committee endorsed him. However, Wagner withdrew from the election as he was not willing to contest a primary. The Liberals ran Albert H. Blumenthal while the Republicans ran John J. Marchi. Liberals for New Politics ran J. Stanley Shaw against Blumenthal in the primary, but lost and Shaw instead endorsed Democratic nominee Abraham Beame, who won the election. Henry Stern was the only Liberal elected to the New York City council in 1973.

The Liberals initially supported Walter Mondale during the 1976 presidential primaries, but he withdrew. The party was divided between Humphrey, Henry M. Jackson, Mo Udall, and Jimmy Carter. The party, despite a lack of enthusiasm, endorsed Carter, but played a minor role in the campaign due to new laws requiring campaign committees approve all literature and campaign spending limits. Rose died on December 28, 1976, and Davidson's wife collapsed on the same day, causing him to retire as executive director.

A collective leadership of Davidson, Harrington, Ray Harding, Ed Morrison, Nicholas Gyory, and Herbert Rose was formed after Rose's death. Harding became the dominant member and was being referred to as the party's leader by 1980. The party initially planned on endorsing Republican Roy M. Goodman in the 1977 New York City mayoral election, but Governor Hugh Carey organized a meeting where he agreed to veto a bill moving primaries from September to June and convinced Mario Cuomo to run. A special mayoral search committee voted in favor of Cuomo over Goodman and Ed Koch and the state committee designated Cuomo as the party's candidate. Cuomo lost the Democratic primary to Koch, but continued his campaign as a Liberal. Cuomo lost to Koch, but the Liberals retained their one city council seat. The party hoped to rise to Row C after the 1978 gubernatorial election due to vote splitting between the Conservative and Right to Life parties, but the Liberals instead fell to Row E.

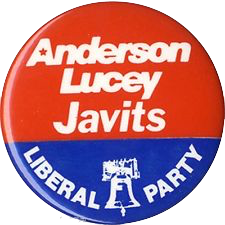
Anderson/Lucey/Javits campaign button, 1980

The Liberals broke with the Democrats at the presidential level for the first time in the 1980 election. The party gave its ballot line to John B. Anderson instead of Carter. Javits also ran as a Liberal in the senatorial election after losing the Republican nomination to Al D'Amato. Anderson and Javits both lost, but their vote totals were greater than the Republican margin of victory. The party was accused of selling its endorsement to Daniel Patrick Moynihan for $100,000 in the 1982 U.S. Senate election.

Rudy Giuliani received the party's nomination in the 1989 and 1993 New York City mayoral elections. The New York Times criticized their endorsement as "little more than a political tool" and the "work of one wily politician", Harding. Giuliani won the 1993 election due to the votes he received on the Liberal ballot line. A Liberal was made deputy mayor in Giuliani's administration and 23 Liberals received appointments. Two of Harding's sons also received positions. The Liberal vote fell to 71,017, a small number over the 50,000 needed to retain ballot access, despite supporting Cuomo's successful campaign in the 1990 gubernatorial election.

Running on the Liberal and Good Government party lines, Melinda Katz won election to the New York State Assembly in 1994, defeating local Democratic district leader and Queens Democratic Party candidate Michael Cohen. The party ran an independent campaign with Betsy McCaughey for governor in the 1998 election, but only received 77,915 votes. The party's position as the left-of-center and pro-labor party was being taken by the Working Families Party. The WFP received more votes than the Liberals in the 2000 presidential and U.S. Senate elections.

H. Carl McCall, the Democratic nominee in the 2002 gubernatorial election, announced that he would not accept the party's nomination. McCall stated that Harding and the Liberals were "an embarrassment to New York's political life". The Liberals gave their nomination to Andrew Cuomo, who dropped out and endorsed McCall. Cuomo remained on the ballot, but did not campaign. The Liberals lost their ballot access after receiving 15,761 votes. David Dinkins, who lost to Giuliani, said that he was "glad they are out of business". The party closed its office in 2003 and the Policy Committee dissolved. The Liberal Party also suffered allegations of corruption and of abandoning its liberal roots in favor of a system of patronage and nepotism – Harding relatives were given appointments in the Giuliani administration, and it was argued that it was a quid pro quo deal, since Giuliani is not generally considered a "liberal" by New York City standards. In 1999, The New York Observer called it an "ideologically bereft institution more interested in patronage than in policy." In 2009, Raymond Harding pleaded guilty to having accepted more than $800,000 in exchange for doing political favors for Alan G. Hevesi, a New York politician who was a frequent Liberal Party endorsee.

In 2005, the New York Daily News reported that incumbent New York City Mayor Michael Bloomberg, then a liberal Republican who favors abortion rights and same-sex marriage, was seeking to revive the Liberal Party – and thereby run on a "Republican/Liberal" ticket – in an effort to win over Democratic voters in the overwhelmingly Democratic city. Bloomberg was re-elected in 2005, but nothing came of these rumors of his campaign being used as a basis for a Liberal Party revival. In 2006, for the first time since the early 1940s, there was no Liberal candidate for Governor. Edward Culvert was the party's candidate for governor in 2010, but the party lacked the resources to muster the necessary petition with 15,000 valid signatures of registered voters to get him onto the ballot. The Liberal Party's current chairman is Jack Olchin. Its executive director is Martin Hassner. Prior to former New York City Parks Commissioner Henry Stern taking over as chairman in 2004, the Liberal Party's longtime leader was Raymond Harding (born Branko Hochwald; January 31, 1935 – August 9, 2012). The Liberal Party cross-endorsed Republican candidate Bob Turner in the New York's 9th congressional district special election, 2011, marking one of the rare times the Liberal Party and the Conservative Party have agreed on a candidate other than an unopposed one.

Raymond Harding died August 9, 2012, in the Bronx of cancer, aged 77, depriving the Liberal Party of its best-known long-term figure. While the Liberal Party still has a website, the last election in which it endorsed candidates, all on other party lines, was the New York City Council races in 2017 until 2025, when it endorsed Independent candidate Andrew Cuomo in the 2025 New York City mayoral election.

== Political positions ==
The party supported Truman's Fair Deal. During the 1949 election, they supported repealing the Taft–Hartley Act, allowing the Communist Party to legally exist, expanding Social Security, and the creation of a national healthcare system. It supported a referendum on the status of Puerto Rico. The party opposed the Mundt–Nixon Bill and McCarran Internal Security Act, although Berle supported an amended version of the Mundt–Nixon Bill. Berle opposed banning the Communist Party. Palestin called for an investigation into the Communist Party's involving in the deaths or disappearance of Juliet Stuart Poyntz, Carlo Tresca, and Leon Trotsky. Palestin supported seating a Communist replacement on the city council following the death of Peter Cacchione, but Goldberg opposed it.

At the 1966 state constitutional convention Harrington argued for maintaining the state's Blaine Amendment. However, the convention voted 130 to 48 to eliminate it. He also unsuccessfully argued to ban the usage of state funds to construct nonpublic schools. Harrington opposed the United States entering the Vietnam War, but Rose wanted to avoid having the party taking a stance on the issue. Multiple county affiliates in upstate New York passed a resolution calling for bombing to end, negotiations with North Vietnam, and aid to rebuild Vietnam. On June 29, 1968, the state committee passed a resolution demanding an immediate ceasefire during negotiations.

== Electoral history ==
Election	Ticket	Electoral results		
Election	Gubernatorial candidate	Votes (Note: Votes cast for the candidate on the Liberal ballot line)	Ranking	Result
1946	James M. Mead (Note: Also ran on the Democratic ballot line)	3.57 / 100.00	4	Lost
1950	Walter A. Lynch	5.00 / 100.00	3	Lost
1954	W. Averell Harriman	5.11 / 100.00	3	Won
1958	W. Averell Harriman	4.28 / 100.00	3	Lost
1962	Robert Morgenthau	4.18 / 100.00	3	Lost
1966	Franklin D. Roosevelt Jr.	8.41 / 100.00	4	Lost
1970	Arthur Goldberg	4.38 / 100.00	4	Lost
1974	Hugh Carey	4.17 / 100.00	4	Won
1978	Hugh Carey	2.59 / 100.00	5	Won
1982	Mario Cuomo	2.20 / 100.00	4	Won
1986	Mario Cuomo	2.80 / 100.00	5	Won
1990	Mario Cuomo	1.75 / 100.00	5	Won
1994	Mario Cuomo	1.77 / 100.00	5	Lost
1998	Betsy McCaughey	1.65 / 100.00	5	Lost
2002	Andrew Cuomo (Note: Withdrew prior to the election)	0.34 / 100.00	9	Lost

== Membership ==
Year	Members/Registered voters	%	Change
1949	14,702		Steady

== See also ==
- Modern liberalism in the United States
- Social liberalism
- Contributions to liberal theory
- Liberalism worldwide
- List of liberal parties

== Works cited ==
- Johnpoll, Bernard (1986). Biographical Dictionary of the American Left. Cornell University Press. ISBN 0313242003.
- Soyer, Daniel (2021). Left in the Center: The Liberal Party of New York and the Rise and Fall of American Social Democracy. Cornell University Press. ISBN 9781501759888. JSTOR 10.7591/j.ctv1hw3x50.2.
- Soyer, Daniel (2012). "'Support the Fair Deal in the Nation; Abolish the Raw Deal in the City': The Liberal Party in 1949". New York History. 93 (2). Cornell University Press: 147–81. JSTOR 23645398.
- Parmet, Robert (2005). The Master of Seventh Avenue: David Dubinsky and the American Labor Movement. New York University Press.
