= Mayoralty of John Lindsay =

Mayoralty in New York City (1966–1974)

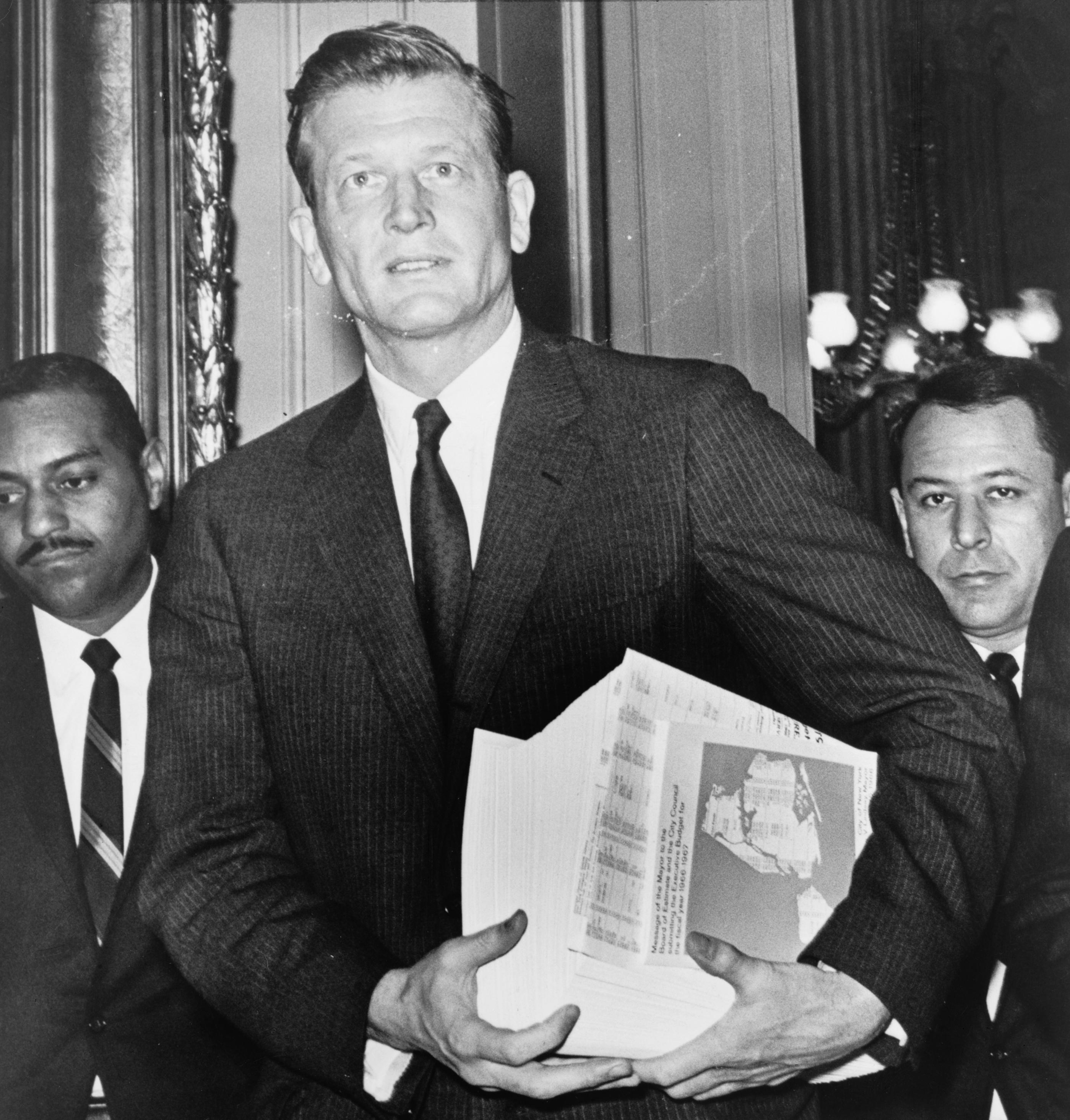
- Mayoralty of John Lindsay; January 1, 1966 – January 1, 1974
- Mayor: John Lindsay
- Party: Republican; Liberal; Democratic
- Election: 1965; 1969
- Seal of New York City, New York

John Lindsay served as the 104th Mayor of New York City from January 1, 1966, to January 1, 1974. His mayoralty presided over a rising budget from below $5 billion to almost $10 billion, high deficit spending, the reorganization of the city's government, a corruption investigation (Knapp Commission) into the New York City Police Department, and large scale union strikes.

Lindsay's victory in the 1965 mayoral election with the Republican nomination and the support of the Liberal Party of New York made him New York City's first Republican mayor since Fiorello La Guardia. He won reelection in the 1969 mayoral election despite losing the Republican nomination.

== Tenure ==
=== Approval ===
Polling by Gallup in 1967 showed that 13% of people had an extremely favorable rating of John Lindsay, polling in 1968 showed that 17% of people had an extremely favorable rating of Lindsay, and polling in 1969 showed that 22% of people had an extremely favorable rating of Lindsay.

=== Budget ===
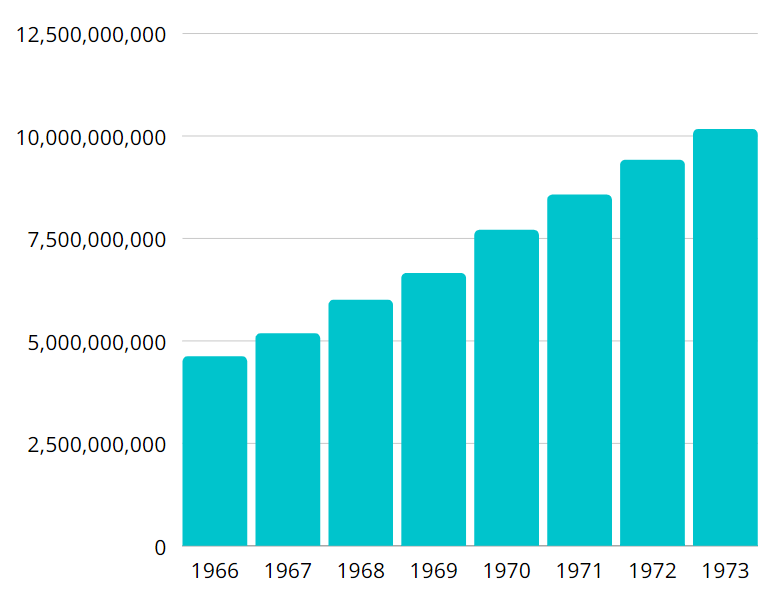
Size of the New York City budget under Mayor John Lindsay

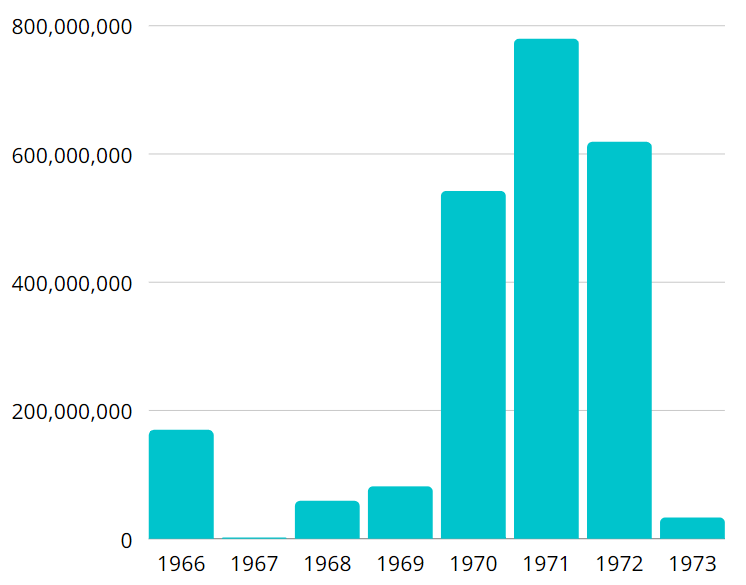
Size of the New York City budget deficit under Mayor John Lindsay

Lindsay vetoed the budget passed by the city council for the 1967-1968 fiscal year, but his veto was overridden by the city council. He vetoed budget cuts made by the city council for the 1968-1969 fiscal year, but his veto was overridden. The city council passed a budget for the 1969-1970 fiscal year that was $313,000 higher than what was requested by Lindsay.

Lindsay attempted to reduce and balance the city's budget during 1971 by firing 2,800 people, while threatening to fire over 90,000 people unless the city was given aid from the state government, reducing funding, and increasing taxes. However, the resulting budget was $9.2 billion and called for the borrowing of over $360 million although the proposed budget would later be reduced to $9.13 billion. Lindsay later reduced the budget by $377.2 million to avoid layoffs. The city council later voted thirty-four to one, with two abstaining, to accept a $8.56 billion budget.

Comptroller Abraham Beame stated that Lindsay had less control over budget spending than any other mayor of New York City and criticized Lindsay's budget cuts. In 1973, Lindsay signed legislation that pushed back budgetary deadlines.

FY	Budget (billions $)	Change (billions $)	Deficit (millions $)	Reference
1966–1967	4.62	▲0.739	169.5	
1967–1968	5.18	▲0.56	1.2	
1968–1969	5.99	▲0.81	58.3	
1969–1970	6.64	▲0.65	80.9	
1970–1971	7.7	▲1.06	541.5	
1971–1972	8.56	▲0.86	779.1	
1972–1973	9.41	▲0.85	618.1	
1973–1974	10.16	▲0.75	32.3	

=== City government ===
Lindsay proposed unifying New York City's transportation agencies under what would become the Metropolitan Transportation Authority (MTA) and presented it to New York State Senate Majority Leader Earl Brydges and Minority Leader Joseph Zaretzki on February 10, 1966. Under Lindsay's plan all transportation would be under the control of Transportation Administrator Arthur Palmer while Robert Moses would lose his job on the Triborough Bridge and Tunnel Authority. Moses criticized the plan as unconstitutional and impractical. Moses, who had served on the Triborough Bridge Authority since his appointment by Mayor Fiorello La Guardia and as chairman of the authority for over thirty years, was fired by Lindsay as City Coordinator in 1966, after he announced $40 million in spending which wasn't authorized by the city and his opposition to the consolidation of the transportation agencies. Lindsay also attempted to have Moses removed from the chairmanship of the Triborough Bridge and Tunnel Authority and replaced by Palmer, but was unsuccessful.

Under Lindsay's tenure New York City's mental health services were reorganized from the Community Mental Health Board to the Department of Mental Health and Mental Retardation Services with J. Herbert Fill continuing to serve as its head. In 1970, Lindsay consolidated New York City's anti-poverty and welfare positions by combing the offices of Human Resources Administrator and Commissioner of Social Services into one position.

Robert Morgenthau, who served as Third Deputy Mayor of New York City, resigned from his position in 1970, and Lindsay abolished the position of Third Deputy Mayor following Morgenthau's resignation. Lindsay selected Bud Palmer to serve as Commissioner of the Department of Public Events.

Lindsay announced a plan in 1970, to decentralize neighborhood government by creating sixty-two districts of community boards which would each have twenty-four to thirty members.

Lindsay wrote a one thousand word letter that was sent to every member of the city council asking for the creation of a Taxi Commission. The legislation was opposed by union leaders including Harry Van Arsdale Jr., the president of the New York City Central Labor Council and Taxi Drivers Union. The city council voted twenty-three to thirteen in favor of the creation of a taxi commission and raising the taxi fares. Lindsay signed the legislation into law and appointed Michael J. Lazar as the first commissioner of the New York City Taxi and Limousine Commission.

=== Civil rights ===
Lindsay prohibited discrimination in employment by companies that worked with the city government in 1968, and in the following three months, 175 black and Puerto Rican people were employed. He signed legislation in 1968 that prohibited discrimination against disabled people in employment, housing, and places of business. Lindsay opposed the extension of the Voting Rights Act of 1965 to include the Bronx, Brooklyn, and Manhattan stating that it was not needed as they was no discrimination in those areas. He signed an executive order in 1970 that prohibited discrimination on the basis of sex or age in city employment or in contract work for the city.

=== Crime and police ===
Lindsay appointed a nine-member task force to study his fifteen-point campaign program on law enforcement. The task force included Lawrence Walsh, Edmund Baisden, Herman Goldstein, Richard L. Gelb, Irving Lang, and Eliot Lumbard. The task force released its report in 1966, that unanimously recommended a police review board with a civilian majority which was opposed by Police Commissioner Vincent L. Broderick. The civilian review board policy was also opposed by the Patrolmen's Benevolent Association. Lindsay appointed Howard R. Leary to replace Broderick as Police Commissioner. He stated that he would have reappointed Broderick as Police Commissioner had he not opposed the civilian review board.

Lindsay criticized the actions Chicago Police Department of the during the protests against the 1968 Democratic National Convention stating that "what happened last night in Chicago should sadden every American". Lindsay criticized anti-crime legislation in 1970, stating that people in Washington, D.C. were “engaged in a futile attempt to combat crime” and that the "real villain" was that $80 billion was spent on defense while less than $500 million was spent on "safety in our streets at home". He criticized the police department for its actions during the Hard Hat Riot in 1970, and ordered an investigation which resulted in the creation of a forty-five page report.

During Lindsay's administration a $1.3 million police communications center, which reduced emergency call times by half, was created and the emergency dial number was reduced from the seven number 440–1234 to 9-1-1. During his tenure a new Police Headquarters started construction at the cost of $45.8 million, despite initial estimates having the cost at $19.8 million in 1961.

An agreement was reached between Lindsay and Governor Nelson Rockefeller in 1967, which would transfer 1,500 of New York City's 6,000 prisoners to be under the control of the state. A hunger strike was conducted by 1,500 prisoners at Rikers Island Penitentiary in 1970, to protest a 1967 law which decreased the amount of time prisoners were allowed to reduce their sentences by through good behavior. Petitions by the inmates were sent to Correction Commissioner George McGrath, Governor Rockefeller, and Mayor Lindsay. Lindsay asked for that state to take control over 4,000 prisoners due to overcrowding problems in 1970.

Lindsay appointed a special committee to investigate allegations of police corruption in 1970, and was led by J. Lee Rankin. The special committee later asked for itself to be superseded by a larger independent citizens group to avoid conflicts of interest. Lindsay appointed a five-member commission consisting of Joseph Monserrat, Cyrus Vance, Franklin A. Thomas, Arnold Bauman, and chaired by Whitman Knapp. The city council voted twenty-nine to eight in favor of granting the commission subpoena powers for six months. The Patrolmen's Benevolent Association opposed the investigation and asked for the New York Supreme Court to prohibit the commission from investigating charges of corruption stating that giving the commission subpoena powers was in violation of a provision added to the New York City Charter in 1966, which ended police review boards composed of civilians that weren't in the police department. Edward J. Kiernan, the president of the Patrolmen's Benevolent Association, asked for the commission to halt its investigation until the court ruling, but the commission continued its investigation. Lindsay called for the city council to grant a six-month extension to the commission's subpoena power, which was granted by the city council. John E. Sprizzo was later appointed to the commission to replace Arnold Bauman.

=== Development ===
During Lindsay's tenure, 45 dilapidated hospital buildings on Welfare Island were condemned in 1966. Lindsay announced in 1968, that a corporation, created by the New York state budget, would construct four hospitals, eight health centers, and two housing projects over the course of five years for the cost of $276.4 million although the city would have to pay back the company. New York City's eighteen hospitals were transferred in 1970, to the New York City Health and Hospitals Corporation under the control of Joseph T. English.

In 1968, Lindsay proposed the Program for Action, a $1.27 billion plan for the MTA that would create eight subway routes, including the Second Avenue Subway, and the extension of the Long Island Rail Road to the East Side and John F. Kennedy International Airport over the course of ten years. Lindsay approved a $11.6 million design contract for the Second Avenue Subway in 1970, with construction expected to be completed by 1976.

Also in 1968, Lindsay signed into law a new 1,459-page building code, the first major revision to New York City's code since 1937.

The construction of the $60 million One Astor Plaza project occurred after Lindsay changed the city's zoning laws to allow for the construction of theaters in Manhattan office buildings. During Lindsay's tenure the Westbeth Artists Community, a $13 million project which was the largest housing project for artists, was completed and opened.

=== Economic policy ===
In 1965, Lindsay formed a fourteen-member anti-poverty task force led by Thomas J. Watson Jr. with the purpose of reviewing New York City's current anti-poverty programs and Lindsay's poverty proposals.

Lindsay proposed tax reform legislation that would have instituted an income tax at the municipal level in 1966. The Westchester County Board of Supervisors unanimously voted in favor of a resolution calling for Westchester County's representatives in the New York State Legislature to vote against Lindsay's proposal. The Economic Development Council, which consisted of twenty-six corporate executives led by Clarence Francis, opposed Lindsay's tax reform plan and instead called for spending cuts and an increased transit fee.

In 1968, the United States Conference of Mayors voted sixty-five to twenty-nine to approve a proposal to guarantee an income of $3,200 per year to families of four in poverty. An eight-member committee to lobby for the proposal was created with Lindsay, Jerome Cavanagh, Ivan Allen Jr., Alfonso J. Cervantes, Henry Maier, James Tate, William F. Walsh, and Floyd H. Hyde serving on the committee.

Lindsay proposed a $500 million plan in 1969, to develop office buildings, department stores, and apartment housing connected via networks of pedestrian passages in Brooklyn. He also proposed a $380 million plan in 1969, to redevelop Jamaica, Queens, with a new subway, railroads to John F. Kennedy International Airport, improvements to the Long Island Rail Road Station, a court building, and two parking garages.

=== Foreign policy ===
Lindsay supported a resolution introduced by Ed Koch which would give unused hospital beds in New York City to wounded children in South Vietnam. Lindsay served as the main speaker at an anti-Vietnam War rally in 1970. Lindsay praised people who evaded the Vietnam War draft stating that he had "unending admiration" for them. He opposed the United States' invasion of Cambodia. The Veterans of Foreign Wars voted to withdraw its 1972 convention from New York City due to Lindsay's praise of draft dodgers.

Lindsay met with Yen Chia-kan, the Vice President of Taiwan, in 1967, when he was seeking American companies to invest into Taiwan. Lindsay met with Israeli Knesset members Itzhak Rafael, Elimelekh Rimalt, Natan Peled, Gideon Hausner, and David Hacohen in 1967. He met with William Tolbert, the Vice President of Liberia, in 1969. He met with the Israeli Minister of Housing, Mordechai Bentov, to discuss housing problems shared between New York City and Israel in 1969. Lindsay met with Mobutu Sese Seko, the president of Zaire, during Mobutu's first official visit to the United States.

Lindsay criticized President Richard Nixon's policy on Israel stating that "the real danger is that our Government may in fact be impeding peace — by encouraging the intransigence of Israel's adversaries, by delaying genuine moves toward peace, and by adding one more weight into the equation of terror and violence in the Middle East." In 1970, he stated that “our policy, must be to preserve peace in the Middle East. Yet today that goal can only be achieved by insuring that Israel is immune from attack". He also criticized attempts to equate Israel and South Vietnam as he stated that “Israel, in the midst of wars and threats, remains a democracy. South Vietnam is a military dictatorship jailing its opponents and shutting down the press.”

=== Housing ===
Prior to taking office Lindsay asked Edward J. Logue to aid in the creation of a housing and renewal program in New York City. He also appointed Ewan Clague to serve as director of the New York City Urban Research Institute.

Lindsay criticized the Housing and Urban Development Act of 1968 and called for the United States Senate and United States House of Representatives to fix "serious weaknesses" with the legislation. He criticized the House of Representatives for removing a part of the legislation which gave $60 million for special services to tenants in public housing, income limitations in the home ownership and rental sections the legislation, and income limitations for the eligibility for federal loans to rehabilitate slum properties. Lindsay later criticized the Housing and Urban Development Act of 1970 for making public housing tenants pay 20% of their income under $3,500, 25% of their income above $3,500, and for limiting how much could be spent on new public housing.

In 1969, Lindsay announced a $53 million housing development plan which would create 1,549 apartments and called for a fifty-year mortgage loan of $49,146,500.

Lindsay proposed in 1970 the most significant change to New York City's rent control legislation since it was created in 1943. He proposed a 15% increase in rent for 125,000 to 150,000 apartments that had no change in tenants, increasing rent by 10.74% for all around 850,000 apartments without leases. It also called for the creation of new rent levels starting on July 1, 1971. His plan was criticized by tenants who threatened to launch a rent strike if the legislation was passed. His plan was also criticized by multiple Democrats, some who had supported him for reelection, including Paul O'Dwyer, Basil A. Paterson, Charles Rangel, Percy Sutton, Robert Abrams, Franz S. Leichter, Richard Ottinger, Ted Sorensen, Howard J. Samuels, Herman Badillo, and William Fitts Ryan. Twelve members of the New York City Council proposed a different plan with reduced rises in the price of rent. The city council passed a version of the legislation, which was signed into law by Lindsay, that would raise the rents while the creation of new rent levels would start on January 1, 1972.

=== Unions ===
Despite talks made with Mike Quill, president of the Transport Workers Union of America, the Transport Workers Union of America and Amalgamated Transit Union went on strike on January 1, 1966, causing a shutdown of New York City's transit system. In response to the strike Lindsay announced an emergency plan which closed all schools for the duration of the strike, the suspension of alternate side of street parking regulations, and the usage of police to maintain maximum protection and the flow of traffic. The strike ended after twelve days after union leaders accepted the results of Lindsay's mediation panel which suggested a 15% wage increase, which would cost the city between $52 million and $70 million. Lindsay stated that the strike cost $500,000,000 over the course of the twelve days. It was estimated that retail stores lost $35–40 million of revenue during the strike. A poll conducted by the Oliver Quayle Company showed that Lindsay's conduct during the strike was approved by 81% of people.

Lindsay was praised by SAG-AFTRA, International Alliance of Theatrical Stage Employees, and other entertainment industry unions for his successful efforts to increase movie production in New York, with it going from thirteen movies being produced in New York in 1965, to fifty movies being produced in New York in 1967. The New York City Central Labor Council, the largest labor union in New York City, and the Transport Workers Union both voted to endorse Lindsay for reelection in 1969.

20,000 to 25,000 building service workers, which would affect over 5,000 buildings, threatened to go on strike in 1970, unless they were given a weekly minimum wage of $135, an increase of $35. Lindsay was able to convince the landlords and the employees to resume their contract discussions after they had been initially suspended. Lindsay and Rent Commissioner Benjamin Altman later worked out a thirty-day interim deal in which the workers would be given a $13 weekly pay raise. A final contractual agreement was reach in which the workers would be given a $18 raise in the first year, a $12 increase in the second year, and a $10 increase in the third year. However, the landlords of around 2,500 buildings refused to sign the new contracts after the city council passed legislation changing the price of rent. Lindsay threatened to impose rent cuts in the buildings where the strikes were occurring, but a ruling by the New York Supreme Court stopped Lindsay from decreasing rent, taking over services, or acting against landlords. The landlords later accepted a contract in which the wages would be increased by $18 in the first year, $12 in the second year, and $10 in the third year.

In 1971, 25,000 patrolmen in the New York City police department, which constituted 85% of the 27,400 patrolmen, stopped working and staged a walkout. The walkout occurred due to the disparity between the wages of patrolmen and police sergeants. After six days of not working the Patrolmen's Benevolent Association voted 229 to 112 to end the walkout.

== Elections ==
=== 1965 ===
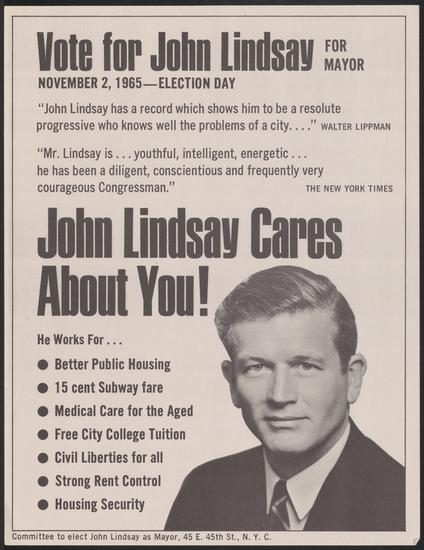
Campaign poster for John Lindsay from the 1965 mayoral election

Lindsay announced on March 1, 1965, that he would not run for Mayor of New York City in the 1965 election, but later announced on May 13, that he would seek the mayoralty. The Liberal Party voted at its convention to give its nomination to Lindsay, with the majority of the 1,000 delegates voting in favor. Lindsay accepted the endorsement of the Republican Party from all five Boroughs, which was given to him by acclamation, despite having said that he would not accept outside help from the Republican Party during the campaign.

He won the nominations of the Liberal and Republican parties without opposition and won in the general election against Abraham Beame and William F. Buckley Jr. with a plurality of the popular vote. During the campaign Lindsay had raised $2,451,919 and ended the campaign with a deficit of $88,058. Lindsay was the first Republican to win election as Mayor of New York City since Fiorello La Guardia.

=== 1969 ===
Lindsay announced that he would seek reelection as Mayor of New York City on March 18, 1969. He won the Liberal Party's nomination by a vote of 276 to 36 at the party's citywide convention. Lindsay lost in the Republican primary to John J. Marchi despite having been endorsed by the Manhattan Republican Committee, Jacob Javits, and Charles Goodell. Following his defeat in the Republican primary Lindsay formed the Independent Party of New York City with the support of a committee of thirteen Democrats and three Republicans.

He defeated Mario Procaccino and Marchi in the general election with a plurality of the popular vote. Lindsay's victory saw the lowest margin of victory for a mayor and the first mayor to see his margin of victory decline since the 1933 election. During the campaign Lindsay had raised $2,248,795, spent $2,033,539, and had a surplus of $215,256. $547,518 was raised and $374,430 was raised by eighteen groups that supported Lindsay.
