= The Faith of Graffiti =

1974 essay by Norman Mailer

- Reprint edition cover, 2009
- Author: Norman Mailer
- Cover artist: Jon Naar
- Language: English
- Subject: Art/Popular Culture
- Genre: Essay
- Set in: New York City
- Published: 2009
- Publisher: Praeger Publishers, It Books
- Publication date: 1974
- Media type: Book
- Pages: 96
- ISBN: 0061961701
- OCLC: 419852704
- First edition published in 1974.

The Faith of Graffiti is a 1974 essay by American novelist and journalist Norman Mailer about New York City's graffiti artists. Mailer's essay appeared in a shorter form in Esquire and as a book with 81 photographs by Jon Naar and design by Mervyn Kurlansky. Through interviews, exploration, and analyses, the essay explores the political and artistic implications of graffiti. The essay was controversial at the time of publication because of its attempt to validate graffiti as an art form by linking it with great artists of the past. Some critics also said Mailer was using the essay as a platform to express his political grievances. Faith grew out of Mailer's existential philosophy of the hip, in which a Hipster is guided by his instincts regardless of consequences or perception, and upholds graffiti as a subversive and healthy check on the status quo. Like several of his other non-fiction narratives, Mailer continued his use of new journalism techniques, adopting a persona, the A-I or "Aesthetic Investigator", to provide both an objective distance from the topic and to engender the text with the creative and critical eye of the novelist.

== Background ==
=== New York ===
The Faith of Graffiti was written during, and following, years of political and social unrest in New York City. Strikes shut down the transit system, schools, and sanitation operations. In protest of public lay-offs and heavy cuts to municipal services, police, firefighters, and workers unions published Welcome to Fear City: A Survival Guide for Visitors to the City of New York, a scare-mongering pamphlet designed to wound tourism in New York. Additionally, a mid-'70s financial crisis resulted in decaying neighborhoods, roads, and critical infrastructure. During this period, some compared New York City to the bombed-out cities in Europe after World War II.

In response to these hardships, graffiti became more prevalent in New York during the 1970s. Increased media coverage seemed to motivate larger and more elaborate graffiti.

Many New Yorkers and city officials shared Mayor John Lindsay's belief that graffiti was defacing their city, but graffiti artists believed their work added character and uniqueness to the urban landscape. An official of the Metropolitan Transportation Authority stated that it cost more than $300,000 per year to erase the graffiti. City council president Sanford Garelik told reporters, "Graffiti pollutes the eye and mind and may be one of the worst forms of pollution we have to combat." Garelik asked citizens to join forces to wage an all-out war on graffiti. Garelik proposed "AntiGraffiti Day" to remove graffiti by scrubbing walls, buildings, fences, subway stations, and subway cars.

In June 1972, Mayor Lindsay announced an anti-graffiti program which included fining and jailing anyone caught with an open spray paint can near any public city building or facility. Robert Laird, Lindsay's Assistant Press Secretary, admitted to a New York Times reporter that "the unsightly appearance of the subway and other public places created by the so-called graffiti artists has disturbed the Mayor greatly". Lindsay appealed to citizens, "For heaven's sake, New Yorkers, come to the aid of your great city—defend it, support it and protect it!"

=== Norman Mailer ===
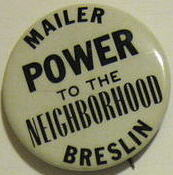

In 1969, Norman Mailer, who had achieved literary renown for his first novel The Naked and the Dead and had been a public figure in the decades since, unsuccessfully campaigned for the Democratic nomination for Mayor of New York City. Four days after his campaign announcement, Mailer won a Pulitzer Prize for The Armies of the Night and contributed the $1,000 in prize money to his campaign. During the campaign, Mailer and his running mate Jimmy Breslin ran on the platform that New York City would become the 51st state, along with other, more creative, initiatives. During a rowdy campaign event, a possibly inebriated Mailer even urged the audience to form a "guerrilla graffiti squad" to write the campaign slogan "No More Bullshit" throughout New York City. The Mailer–Breslin ticket came in fourth in the Democratic Primary, losing by a margin of 27.54%, or 214,241 votes to New York City Comptroller Mario Procaccino. Procaccino later ended up losing in the general election to incumbent John Lindsay, who ran as a member of the Liberal Party of New York.

After the tepid reception of his biography of Marilyn Monroe in 1973, Mailer began to struggle financially. In 1974, his Marilyn collaborator Lawrence Schiller sent Mailer photographs of New York City graffiti by Jon Naar and offered him $35,000 for an essay to accompany them. Mailer agreed, and his then-agent Scott Meredith delivered a contract securing Mailer $50,000 for his work.

== Synopsis ==
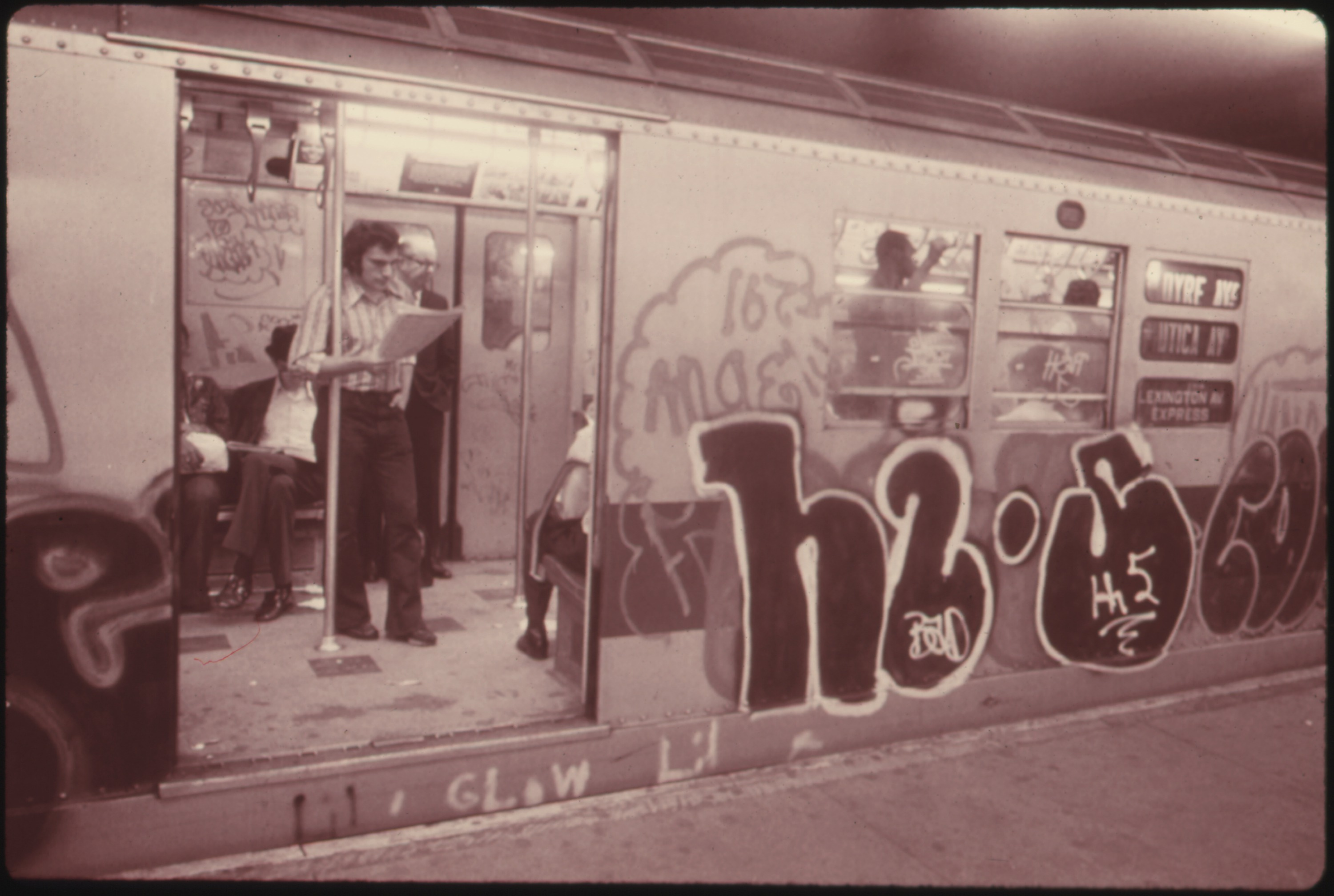
Graffiti on New York subway car, 1973

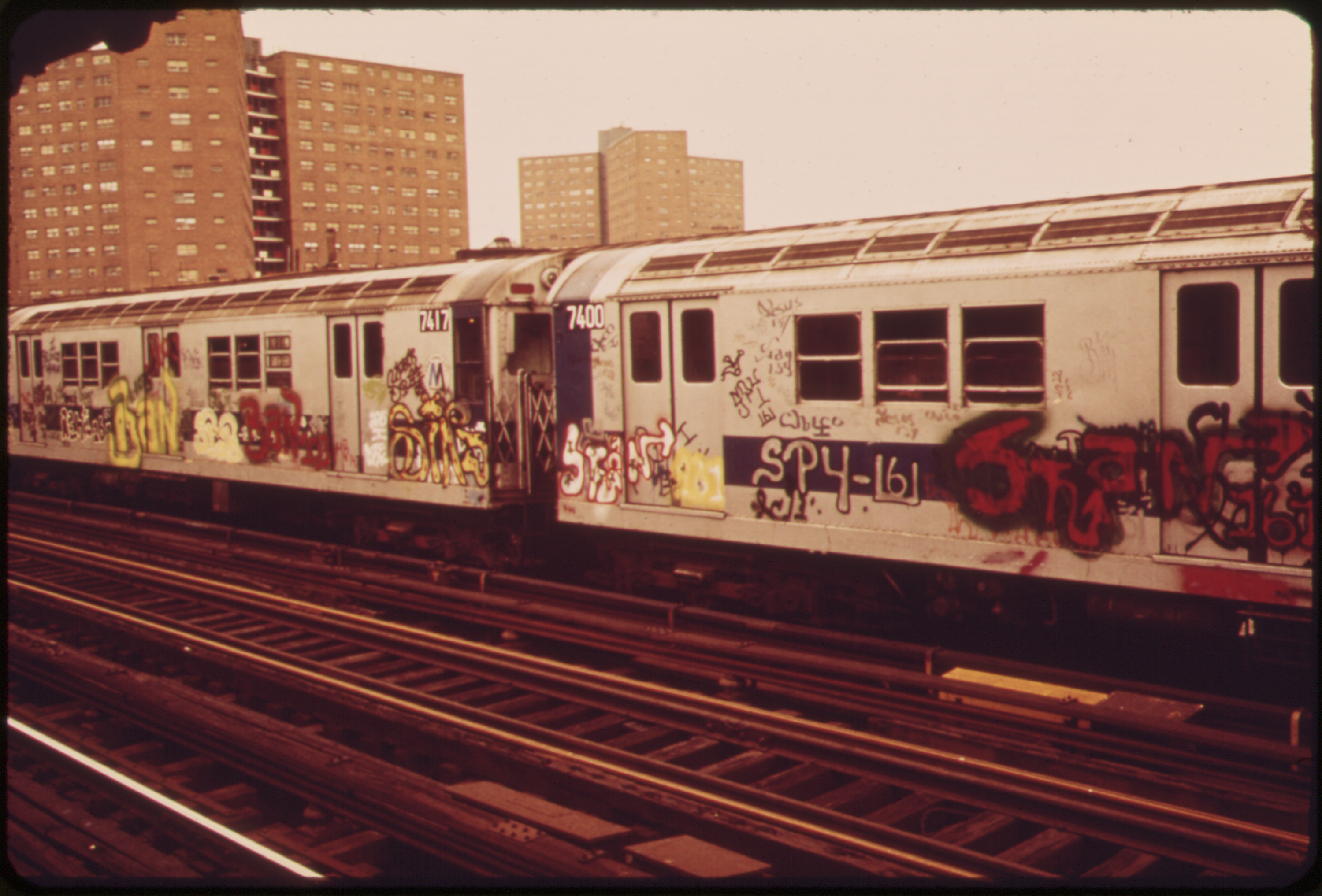
New York City subway train covered in graffiti, 1973

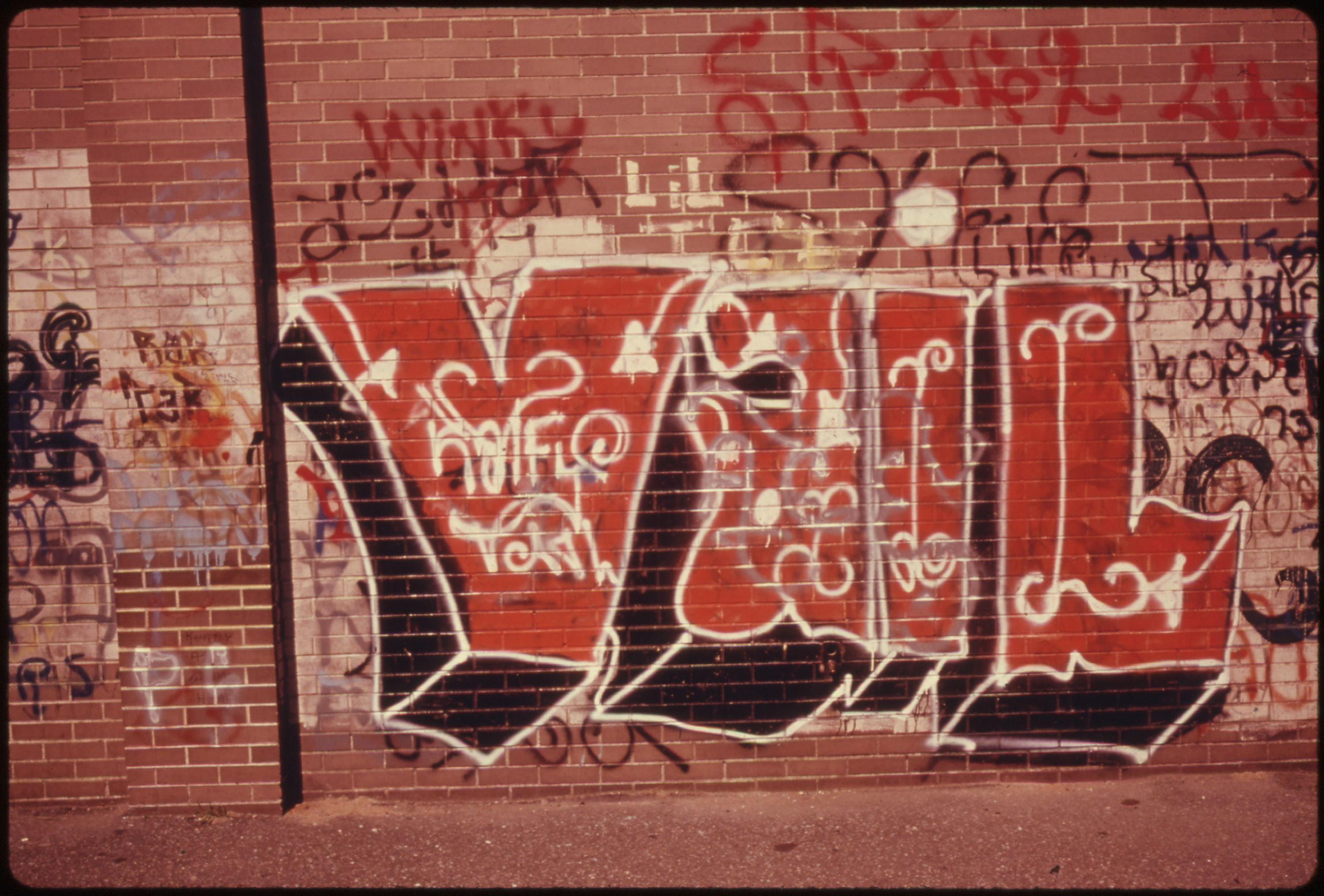
Graffiti on a brick wall in Brooklyn, 1974

The Faith of Graffiti is a five-part essay. Each part moves from surface-level content like interviews with the graffiti artists to philosophical musings on art and politics.

In Part 1 of the essay, Mailer discusses the lives and inspirations of prominent graffiti artists. Mailer adopts the persona of the "Aesthetic Investigator", or A-I. To understand the motivations and drive of the graffitists, the A-I interviews four retired graffiti artists: CAY 161, JUNIOR 161, LI'L FLAME, and LURK. These graffitists strive to get their "names", how they are known as artists, in dangerous places "where people don't know how you could do it". The "name" is subversive; it challenges authority, and, akin to a gangster's hit, is linked to poverty, crime, and death. "The name", says CAY, "is the faith of graffiti."

In Part 2, Mailer details the "existential stations of the criminal act" as graffitists prepare for their next "writing" by first "inventing", or stealing, paint. Authorities are ever-present and have recently been cracking down on graffitists, heightening their fears and stopping many of them. There exists a compulsion, however, to "commit the artistic act" in order to combat the "assault on the psyche" of modern life. Since they could be "comic strips come to life", subway cars are "their natural canvas" to "save the sensuous flesh" from the city's increasing homogeneity.

Part 3 describes the A-I's visit to the Museum of Modern Art for further insight into graffiti artists, and he sees graffiti as an “alluvial delta” of the river or art. Art then, becomes culture, in a similar way as plants transmitting information or speaking to one another, the works of artists trickle down to the streets of the city's graffiti artists. He states "art begot art" through a "psychic sea". A-I concludes that, "when it comes to a matter of who might influence the writers of graffiti, one is not obliged to speak only of neon signs, comic strips and TV products, one has the other right to think the kids are enriched by all art which offers the eye a resemblance to graffiti". He draws references to the works of Henri Matisse, David Alfaro Siqueiros, Vincent van Gogh, and Willem de Kooning as their art may have "streamed down from the museums through media to the masses".

Part 4 details the A-I's interview with the outgoing mayor of New York, John Lindsay. They examine Lindsay's view that graffiti was a "dirty shame" committed by "insecure cowards". The A-I notes the development of "the ugliest architecture in the history of New York" during Lindsay's time as mayor and considers that this may have been an effort to curtail the impact of graffiti on New York's reputation. However, the A-I muses that not many tourists could differentiate between subway graffiti and drawings on restroom stalls, and both announce the presence of criminality. The A-I concludes that "the fear of the insane graffiti writer in the self" shaped responses to the act from both city officials and tourists.

In Part 5, Mailer considers the various cultural and historical uses of art. He concludes that graffiti is perhaps the most germane expression of "the possible end of civilization": it "speaks of a new civilization where barbarism is stirring at the roots". Graffiti is an expression of the ghetto; a resistance to the "oncoming universal machine" of the "mass-man without identity"; a defiant shout of identity and courage of the individual; and an expression of a "more primeval sense of existence" that promotes discomfort and, perhaps, signals an oncoming apocalypse. The A-I concludes that "graffiti lingers on our subway door as a memento of all the lives ever lived, sounding like the bugles of gathering armies across the unseen ridge".

== Style ==
Beginning with his Pulitzer Prize-winning The Armies of the Night in 1967, Mailer developed a form of new journalism wherein he adopts a third-person persona to become an integral part of the story and to endow the chronicle with emotion and drama it might otherwise lack. His intention, he writes in The Armies of the Night, was to develop "new metaphors for appreciating what he called his 'endless blendings of virtue and corruption.'" Mailer became known, and often critiqued, for writing from this first-person perspective or "dramatic dialectic".

In Faith, Mailer adopts the persona of the "Aesthetic Investigator", or A-I, allowing him to comment objectively about himself as a character and a foil through which to engage graffiti. This blending of the subjective and objective, or what critic Jason Mosser calls "genre-bending", endows journalism with a novelist's sensibility. This double perspective, called illeism, of the protagonist and writer allowed Mailer to examine the A-I with a more distanced and measured perspective. Mailer's adoption of the A-I turned the "chores", what Mailer calls journalism, into a more creative endeavor.

Mailer is well known for the complexity of his writing—complexity which manifested in both the size of his works and the range of his topics. He tended to hybridize genres by blending journalism with creative nonfiction as seen in his non-traditional biographies such as The Executioner's Song, The Fight, and Marilyn: A Biography.

== Analysis ==
Mailer's biographer J. Michael Lennon describes The Faith of Graffiti as Mailer's "least cogent major essay". Lennon cites two reasons for Mailer's admiration of graffiti artists: graffiti is an act of transgression against social norms, and graffiti artists are brave in their confrontation of the potential legal ramifications, such as beatings or imprisonment. Public art critic Enrico Conadio calls Faith the first "epistemological legitimisation" of the art of graffiti as it examines graffiti critically and intellectually, rather than as just an urban phenomenon. Faith also connects graffiti with non-American cultural roots to "renew American imaginative life" and provides a connection to the beginnings of art and its roots in the human psyche.

In her book Existential Battles, Laura Adams describes Faith as Mailer's continued exploration into the "assertion of ego against totalitarianism". Literary critic Michael Cowan states that Mailer's essay had an Emersonian appeal, venerating artists as "liberating gods" who promote individual and social change: "Mailer wants to use the blank wall of his contemporary technological society as a canvas on which to paint a colorful communal jungle of psychological, aesthetic, and religious possibility." Literary critic John Seelye sees a similar use in Mailer's persona, A-I. The "I" is a Roman numeral one and "A" is for "Advertisement" suggesting A-I is an advertisement for Mailer himself and alluding to Mailer's 1959 book Advertisements for Myself. Mailer, like the graffitist, is an existential artist who pushed boundaries, challenged the status quo, and daily forged his identity through art.

A large part of The Faith of Graffiti sees Mailer musing about whether tags scrawled on public spaces have any artistic merit. The work is quintessentially a book on art, as A-I spends much of his time musing on the state of creativity and expression in the modern world. Mailer traces the historical flow of art to graffiti: from cave paintings to the performativity of contemporary art and its drive to find new modes of expression. While Mailer "tells his media story superbly", writes New York Times critic Corinne Robins, it falls short of gaining any true "cosmic insights" about graffiti as art more than it is political.

Throughout Faith, Mailer connects New York City's graffiti culture to the hip, a concept he developed in his 1957 essay The White Negro. A Hipster is guided by his instincts regardless of consequences or the perception of those actions. Mailer associates CAY 161 with the Hipster by detailing CAY's criminal acts, such as stealing a van and running from the police. In doing so, CAY 161 becomes an exemplar of hip within the graffiti community. Similarly, by defining CAY 161 as hip and linking him to earlier graffitists like TAKI 183, art critic Edward Birzin argues that Mailer elevates graffiti to an artistic movement.

== Publication ==
The Faith of Graffiti was published on May 7, 1974. The work appeared simultaneously as a shorter essay in Esquire and as a book by Praeger Publishers. The project was conceived by Lawrence Schiller with 81 photographs by Jon Naar and book design by Mervyn Kurlansky. The book was also published in London in 1974 as Watching My Name Go By. The essay without photographs was reprinted in Mailer's 1982 collection Pieces and Pontifications and his 1998 anthology The Time of Our Time. In 2009, It Books republished the book with an additional 32 pages of photos and a new afterword by Jon Naar.

== Reception ==
The Faith of Graffiti garnered less attention from critics compared to Mailer's other works, receiving mixed to negative reviews.

Critics considered Faith controversial due to Mailer's apparent glorification of graffiti artists. Subway City author Michael Brooks asks "Who better than the author of Advertisements for Myself to analyze calligraphic assertions of personal glory?" The controversy, explains Mailer biographer Mary Dearborn, centers around Mailer's "praise of graffiti" as "an indigenous art form" deserving of praise and respect, not scorn.

A New York Times review by Corrine Robins claims that Mailer did a disservice to graffiti by using the work as a platform for his own political gain and to highlight the flaws in the city's administration. Mailer fails to comment on specific graffiti, which, states Robins, was an injustice to the art. Similarly, Monroe Beardsley argues that Mailer places too much emphasis on the artist and graffiti as a social statement; Mailer oversteps, Beardsley suggests, by romanticizing the graffiti artists in comparing them to Renaissance painters. Literary critic Eliot Fremont-Smith calls the essay "convoluted", "circular", "provocative", and ultimately interested in the "enticement, the thrall, the dread, the value, and the metaphysics of risk alone".

When The Faith of Graffiti was re-issued in late 2009, reviews were also mixed. Chicago Art Magazine described Mailer's essay as "off the rails" and "berserk"; Bookforum Magazine termed it "half-brilliant, half mad"; and The Atlantic called it "bombastic" while praising Naar's images as "stunning". Though Mailer acknowledges the social power of graffiti, Ian Brunskill observes, "the essay shows Mailer at his best and worst. Vain, pretentious, overwritten, and at times obscure or absurd, it nonetheless set the terms in which graffiti has been written about ever since." Brunskill concludes that Faith defends graffiti as an art form and supports the movement's artists as revolutionaries.

== Bibliography ==
- "The 1969 Pulitzer Prize Winner in General Nonfiction". The Pulitzer Prizes. 1969.
- Adams, Laura (1976). Existential Battles: The Growth of Norman Mailer. Athens: Ohio University Press. ISBN 0-8214-0182-3.
- Austin, Joe (2001). Taking the Train: how graffiti art became an urban crisis in New York City. New York: Columbia University Press. ISBN 978-0-231-11142-3.
- Baker, Kevin (May 18, 2015). "Welcome to Fear City - the inside story of New York's civil war, 40 years on". The Guardian.
- Beardsley, Monroe (Spring 1975). "The Faith of Graffiti". The Journal of Aesthetics and Art Criticism. 33 (3): 373–374. doi:10.2307/428378. JSTOR 428378.
- Birzin, Edward (2019). Subway Art(efact) (Dissertation). Philosophie und Geisteswissenschaften.
- Bonadio, Enrico (2019). The Cambridge Handbook of Copyright in Street Art and Graffiti. Cambridge: Cambridge University Press. ISBN 978-1-108-67404-1.
- Born, Kathryn (February 3, 2010). "Book Review: The Faith of Graffiti". Chicago Art Magazine.
- Brooks, Michael W. (1997). Subway City: Riding the Trains, Reading New York. New Brunswick, New Jersey: Rutgers University Press. ISBN 978-0-8135-2396-5.
- Brunskill, Ian (Autumn 2013). "The Writing on the Wall". The American Interest. Vol. 9. pp. 90–96.
- Carlson, Jen (September 16, 2013). "The 1970s Pamphlet Aimed At Keeping Tourists Out Of NYC". The Gothamist. New York Public Radio.
- Cowan, Michael (1986). "The Quest for Empowering Roots: Mailer and the American Literary Tradition". In Lennon, J. Michael (ed.). Critical Essays on Norman Mailer. Boston: G. K. Hall & Company. pp. 156–173. ISBN 0-8161-8695-2.
- Dearborn, Mary V. (1999). Mailer: A Biography. Boston: Houghton Mifflin. ISBN 0-395-73655-2.
- Fremont-Smith, Eliot (May 6, 1974). "Mailer on the IRT". New York Magazine. New York: New York Media, LLC. pp. 97–98.
- "Garelik Calls for War on Graffiti". The New York Times. May 21, 1972. p. 66.
- Hsu, Hua (2010a). "Off the Wall". Bookforum. No. Feb/Mar2010.
- — (March 24, 2010). "The Faith of Graffiti". The Atlantic Magazine.
- Lennon, Michael (Fall 1977). "Mailer's Radical Bridge". The Journal of Narrative Technique. 7 (3): 170–188. JSTOR 30225618.
- — (2013). Norman Mailer: A Double Life. New York: Simon and Schuster. ISBN 978-1-4391-5021-4. OCLC 873006264.
- —; Lennon, Donna Pedro (2018). Lucas, Gerald R. (ed.). Norman Mailer: Works and Days (Revised and Expanded ed.). Atlanta: Norman Mailer Society. ISBN 978-1-7326519-0-6. Archived from the original on 2018-11-22.
- "Lindsay Assails Graffiti Vandals". The New York Times. August 25, 1972. p. 30.
- Mailer, Norman (1959). Advertisements for Myself. New York: Putnam. ISBN 0-674-00590-2.
- — (1982) [1974]. "The Faith of Graffiti". Pieces and Pontifications. Boston: Little, Brown. ISBN 9780316544184.
- — (May 1, 1974). "The Faith of Graffiti". Esquire. pp. 77–88, 154, 157, 158.
- McKinley, Maggie (2017). Understanding Norman Mailer. Columbia, South Carolina: University of South Carolina. ISBN 978-1-61117-806-7. OCLC 988028044.
- Mills, Hilary (1982). Mailer: A Biography. New York: McGraw-Hill. ISBN 0-88015-002-5.
- Mosser, Jason (2009). "Genre Bending in The Armies of the Night". The Mailer Review. 3 (1): 307–321. ISSN 1936-4687.
- "New York City Mayor Democratic Primary Race 1969". Our Campaigns. n.d.
- "New York City Mayoral Election 1969". Our Campaigns.
- Perlmutter, Emanuel (June 26, 1972). "Fines and Jail for Graffiti Will Be Asked by Lindsay". The New York Times. p. 66.
- Richardson, Jack (May 8, 1969). "The Aesthetics of Norman Mailer". The New York Review of Books. ISSN 0028-7504.
- Roberts, Sam (2007-11-18). "Mailer's Nonfiction Legacy: His 1969 Race for Mayor". The New York Times.
- Robins, Corinne (May 5, 1974). "The Faith Of Graffiti". The New York Times. p. 450.
- Schwartzman, Paul (June 15, 2019). "F-bombs and insults: Norman Mailer's epic run for mayor of New York in 1969". The Washington Post.
- Seelye, John (May 25, 1974). "Press Button to Release". The New Republic. pp. 23–24. ISSN 0028-6583.
- "Taki 183 Spawns Pen Pals". The New York Times. July 21, 1971. p. 37.
- Thompson, Margo (2009). American Graffiti. New York: Parkstone International. ISBN 978-1-84484-561-3.
- Weisman, Steven (April 1972). "Why Lindsay Failed as Mayor". The Washington Monthly.
