= Cool S =

Graffiti symbol

- Type: Textual object
- Writing: Latin script
- Symbols: S
- Created: 20th century
- Classification: Trademarked in the United States
- Culture: Childlore

The Cool S, also known as the Universal S, the Super S, the Pointy S, and the Graffiti S, is a graffiti sign in popular culture and childlore that is typically doodled on children's notebooks or graffitied on walls. The exact origin of the Cool S is unknown, but it became prevalent around the early 1980s as a part of graffiti culture.

== Shape ==
The Cool S consists of 14 line segments, forming a stylized, pointed S-shape. It has also been compared to the infinity symbol. The S appears to have depth, where the overlap in the center of the S and the appearance of a potential altitude change at the top and bottom of the S make it look like the S connects back to itself in the same way as the infinity symbol does. The Cool S has no reflection symmetry, but has 2-fold rotational symmetry.

The Cool S is started by drawing three short vertical lines, parallel and evenly-spaced, and then drawing another, identical group of three lines below them, separated by a gap the same length as each line segment.

On a Cartesian coordinate system, these segments can be described as (0,4)–(0,3) / (1,4)–(1,3) / (2,4)–(2,3) and (0,2)–(0,1) / (1,2)–(1,1) / (2,2)–(2,1). Then, two diagonal lines are drawn, each connecting two of the line segments drawn in the prior step: (0,3)–(1,2) and (1,3)–(2,2). Next, two V shapes are drawn to create the top and bottom of the shape. One is inverted: (0,4)–(1,5)–(2,4) and the other is upright: (0,1)–(1,0)–(2,1). Finally, the two open ends are connected to the diagonal segments' midpoints: (0,2)–(1/2,2 1/2) and (2,3)–(1 1/2,2 1/2).

== History ==
The exact origin of the symbol is unclear; however, it is generally considered to be an artifact of childlore, meaning that it is taught by children to children over the course of generations. Some people have even reported seeing the S as early as the 1960s. Similar designs for the S have also been identified as early as 1890.

Jon Naar's photographs of graffiti in New York City, which were taken in 1973 and published in The Faith of Graffiti in 1974, frequently contain the symbol. Jean-Michel Basquiat's artworks also occasionally feature it, such as in Charles the First, and in Untitled (Olive Oyl) it is labelled "CLASSIC S OF GRAFF".

In July 2020, the S was trademarked in the United States as "The S Thing" by Mark May, a man who had no involvement in its creation. He said he would only consider suing large companies over its use.

Several unverified claims have been made about the origin of the Cool S. The name "Superman S" comes from a belief that it was a symbol for Superman, whose costume features a stylized S in a diamond shape, but that shape is different. It has been suggested to originate with the band Sacred Reich, but a member of the band denied this. A marketing manager at Suzuki, whose logo was another purported origin of the symbol, denied that its logo ever contained the symbol. It has also been suggested to be associated with the Sureños. According to a prominent former detective, southern Californian gangs usually use "S-13" or "SUR" and "S" would likely not be associated with the Sureños.

The symbol is widely associated with the fashion brand Stüssy. However, Emmy Coats (who has worked alongside Shawn Stussy since 1985) has stated that it was not originally a symbol of the company.

== See also ==
- Henohenomoheji
- Emoticon
- Twin mountain drawing
- Kilroy was here
- Sator Square
- Graffiti
- Folklore
