= James Lambie =

James M. Lambie, Jr. (September 19, 1914 – November 30, 1999) served in the Eisenhower Administration (1953–1961) as Special Assistant and Assistant Staff Secretary coordinating public information programs between the Advertising Council and the U.S. government.

Lambie was born in Washington, Pennsylvania and attended Washington and Jefferson College, the University of Michigan at Ann Arbor, and Pennsylvania State College.

Before joining Dwight D. Eisenhower’s campaign staff in 1952 he worked for the National Committee for a Free Europe, Inc., and Crusade for Freedom. In 1953 President Eisenhower assigned him the job of Special Assistant in the White House where he served as the coordinator of public information programs between the Advertising Council and the U.S. government and arbitrated conflicting government claims for the use of the Advertising Council’s facilities for public service campaigns. In 1960 he was appointed the Assistant Staff Secretary on the White House staff.

From September 1954 to January 1961 Lambie also served in an unofficial capacity as Deputy Chairman of the Interagency Committee for Agricultural Surplus Disposal. The purpose of this committee, chaired by Clarence Francis, was to carry out the provisions of P.L. 480 by coordinating the various agricultural surplus disposal activities of the U.S. government.
