= Childlore =

Folk culture of young people

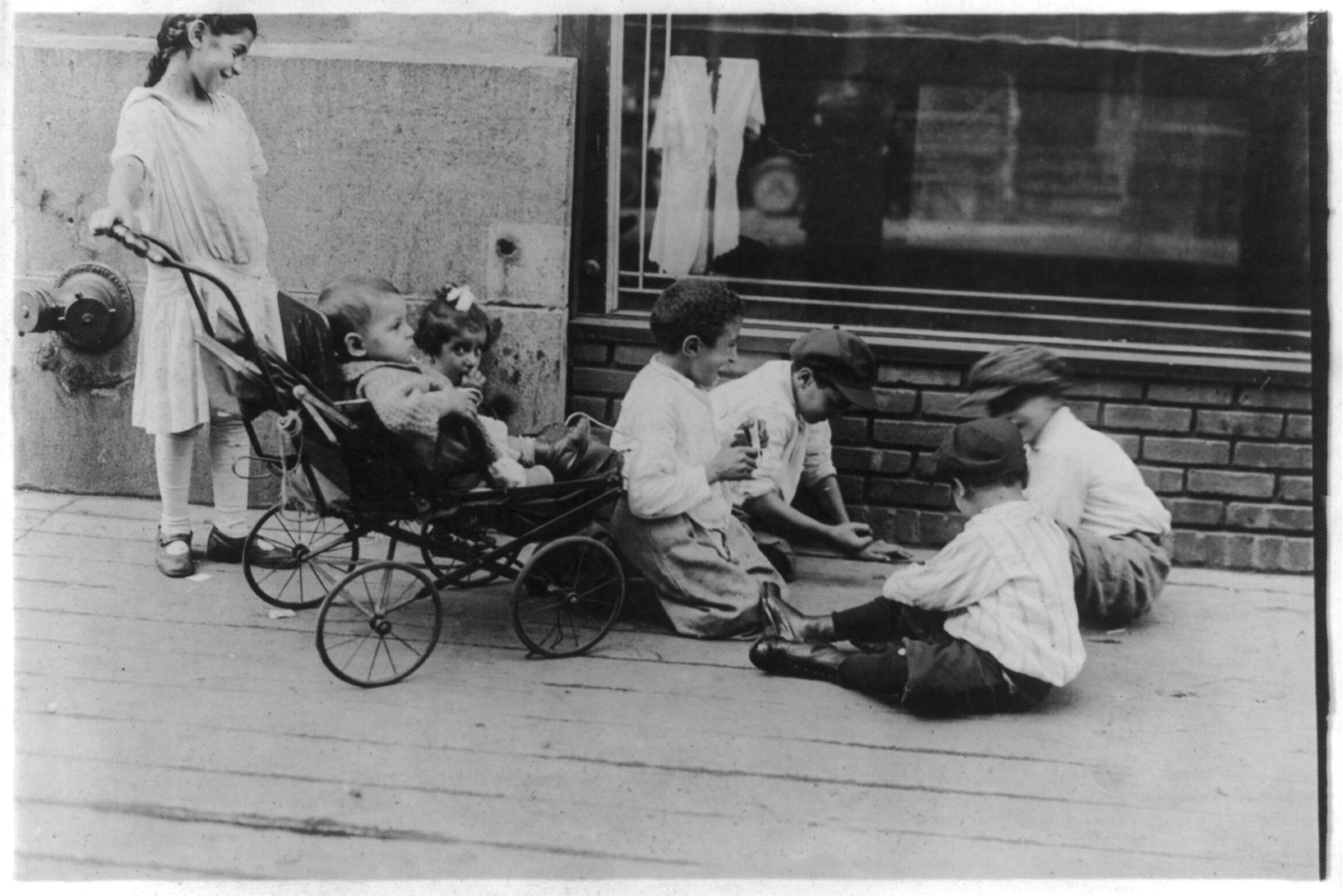
Syrian children playing in a New York City street

Childlore is a folklore or folk culture that is learned and passed on by children to other children (typically between the ages of 6 and 15). It excludes the stories and tales told and spread by adults. Childlore can include games, riddles, rhymes, oral stories, codes, fantasies, jokes, and superstitions created by children. In Western culture, most folklorists are concerned with children after they join their peers in primary school or kindergarten. The traditions of childlore generally stop after children leave elementary school or primary school, which coincides with puberty and adolescence, and the end of early childhood.

The record and study of childlore began taking shape in the 19th century. The study began with recording nursery rhymes and child games with some of the first known to be Popular Rhymes of Scotland and Mother Goose's Melodies. These records were created through observation, capture and documentation of childhood activities and games. However, most of the traditional games and rhymes have survived orally, as children pass them through the generations themselves. In the last 40 years, childlore has been changing significantly due to factors such as higher supervision by parents and the introduction of technology. With a shift to more solo activities and technological communication, childlore has seen an engagement change.

Alice Gomme and Iona and Peter Opie are some of the most well-known contributors to the collection of childlore in the United Kingdom. While Gomme focused mostly on broad folklore, the Opies are considered to be the ones who shaped childlore into a serious study. Similar studies have also been done by earlier researchers, such as Dorothy Howard, however it was not popularized until the Opies' research. Since their contributions, the research on childlore and its changes has continued. Studies have been done to look into the effect of technology on traditional childlore as well as major event effects. The Play Observatory is an example of a group that looked into the effect the COVID-19 pandemic had on children, specifically their play and socialization.

== See also ==
- Children's street culture
- Cool S
- Cooties
- Imaginary friend
- Latin American childlore
- "The circle" game
- The floor is lava
- Secret handshake
- Summer camp
- Pig Latin
- Cheese Touch
