= Latin American childlore =

Childlore of Latin American countries

Latin American childlore, the childlore of Latin American countries, has still not been studied to the same extent as that of other countries. The study of British children carried out by Iona and Peter Opie suggests that childlore is more conservative than adult culture. A similar study carried out in a Latin American country might therefore discover among indigenous children verses unchanged since before the conquest, or perhaps, in a large city, traditions preserved from the civilization of Granada.

== Collections ==
The studies done in Latin America are mainly collections. Frances Toor's 'Treasury of Mexican Folkways' has several sections devoted to childlore. On pages 66 and 67 she discusses 'the Mexican toy world.' Included, of course, are the toys made by adults for children. But also 'children are clever at inventing substitutes. They make them of bones, stones, sticks, and rags. Their make-believe world is generally like the adult world, filled with belief in magic and miracles.' ( 67) She briefly discusses the childhood and youth of young people (120) and has nine pages of children's games and songs. ( 261 ff.) Here is an example of a children's circle dance,

  Sweet orange, divided lemon
  Tell Mary not to lie down.
  Mary, Mary she did lie down;
  Death came and carried her off. (271)

Vincente T. Mendoza has published a book in Spanish of some 193 children's songs of Mexico.(Mendoza) The songs, with words and music, are organized into groups such as cradle songs, religious songs, children's games, songs that can go on forever, story songs, and nonsense and miscellaneous songs. For example, a popular song, this version from the Valley of Teotihuacan, that has the flavor but quite different lyrics from The Old Lady Who Swallowed a Fly is La Rana.

  Cuando la rana quiere gozar,
  viene el sapo y la hace llorar. (bis)
  El sapo a la rana;
  La rana al aqua;
  Se echa a nadar.
  Cuando el sapo quiere gozar,
  viene el mosca y lo hace llorar. (bis)
  El mosca al sapo;
  El sapo a la rana

This can be roughly translated as the following:

"When the frog wants to enjoy herself,

the toad comes and makes her cry. (encore)

The toad to the frog;

The frog to water;

He takes to swimming.

When the toad wants to enjoy himself,

the fly comes and makes him cry. (encore)

The fly the toad;

The toad and the frog."

The final verse of the eleven that Mendoza records is,

  Cuando la muerte quiere gozar,
  Viene Dios y la hace llorar. (bis)
  Dios a la muerte;
  La rana al agua
  Se echa a nadar.(185)

It roughly translates as such:

"When death wants to enjoy herself,

God comes and makes her cry. (encore)

God to death;

The frog to water

He takes to swimming."

Judy Sierra and Robert Kaminski have written a book of children's traditional games from 137 countries and cultures. The games from Latin America include games that were introduced to the native peoples by the Spanish and games introduced to the Spanish by the native peoples as well as traditional games of the two communities still played within those communities.

Finally, Herbert Halpert has published a Childlore bibliography (Halpert) which while 'concentrating particularly on England and Scotland' includes 'a smattering from other continents, concluding with the West Indies and Latin America.' (205)
