= Beverly Russell =

British-American journalist and design magazine editor (1934–2021)

- Beverly Russel in 1979 - photo by Robert Levin
- Born: December 9, 1934; London, England
- Died: December 11, 2021 (aged 87); Albuquerque, New Mexico, US
- Occupation: Editor
- Spouses: 1st Roger Beardwood 2nd Jon Naar
- Children: 1

Beverly Russell (December 9, 1934 – December 11, 2021) was a British-American journalist and editor. She led the design magazines Interiors and Architecture.

== Biography ==
Beverly Anne Russell was born on December 9, 1934, in London to Leslie and Maude Russell. Her father was a department store executive. Her mother was a homemaker. She had a sister, Gillian.

== Career ==
The Manchester Evening News was her first journalism position. After she moved to New York in 1967, she got a position with Condé Nast. There she worked at Brides and then House & Garden. She moved to San Miguel de Allende, Mexico, in the 1970s where she lived in an artistic expatriate community. In 1979, she was hired as the editor of Interiors magazine, a trade magazine for the interior design industry. Under her leadership, the magazine became business oriented and promoted women in the field. In 1991, she founded Beverly Russell Enterprises and was a business consultant. She officially retired in 2006.

Her 1992 book, Women of Design, was the first survey of female interior designers. The book also presents a history of design, including the predecessors of modern design when the term "interior decorator" was commonly used for the profession.

== Personal life ==
She was married to journalist Roger Beardwood. Together they had a son, Benjamin. After the divorce of Beardwood, she married the photographer Jon Naar. That marriage also ended in divorce.

Russell died on December 11, 2021, through physician-assisted suicide in Albuquerque, New Mexico, following a terminal heart diagnosis.

== Books ==
- Russell, Beverly (August 1, 1980). Designers' Workplaces: Thirty Three Offices by Designers for Designers. Whitney Library of Design. ISBN 978-0823074921. (also Watson-Guptill Publications, 1983)
- Russell, Beverly (November 1, 1992). Women of Design: Contemporary American Interiors. Rizzoli International Publications. ISBN 978-0847816149.
- Russell, Beverly (March 25, 1999). Women of Taste: Recipes and Profiles of Famous Women Chefs. John Wiley & Sons. ISBN 978-0471331797. (first published 1997)
- Russell, Beverly (May 1, 2015). Deadline Diva: A Journalist's Life. Beverly Russell Enterprises. ISBN 978-1320840354.

== Articles ==
- "Ray Kappe's enduring modernism". Modernism Magazine. 7 (3): 76. 2004.
