= Twin mountain drawing =

Drawing pattern made by Indonesian students

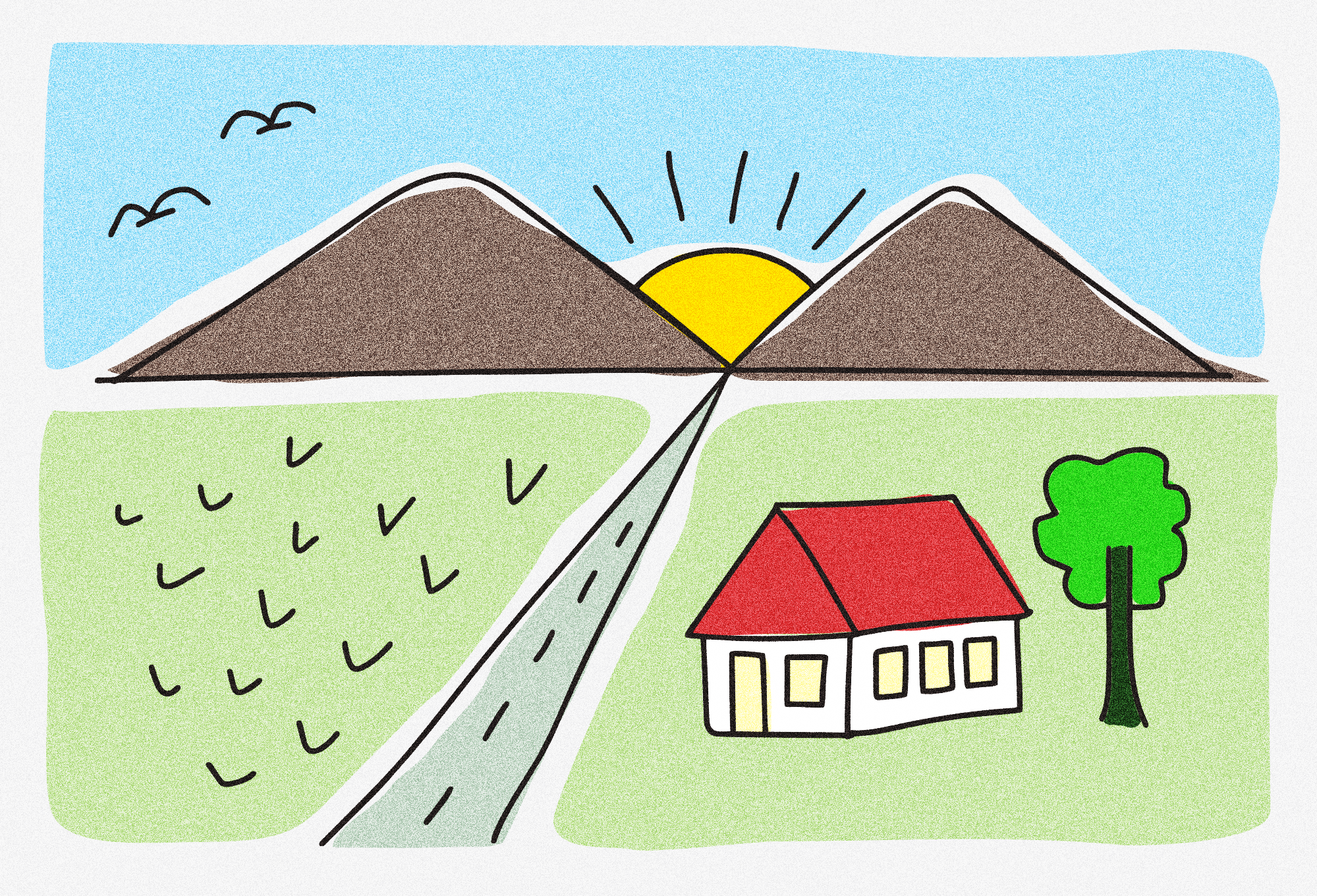
A typical twin mountain drawing

A drawing of twin mountains (Indonesian: pemandangan gunung kembar, "twin mountain view", or pemandangan gunung legendaris, "legendary mountain view") is a drawing pattern commonly made by Indonesian kindergarten and primary school students. The drawing is often produced by students who are asked by their teacher to draw natural features.

The drawing is typically characterized by a road stretching between vast fields of rice that leads toward two mountains on the horizon, with the sun nestled in the space between the two peaks. Other objects commonly added by students include clouds, trees, grass (or paddy fields), people (or paddy farmers), a house (the farmer's), and birds seen from afar. The significance of the drawing is to demonstrate the tendency of children to compose symmetrical scenes that consist of asymmetrical features, as well as a tendency to imitate their peers.

== History ==
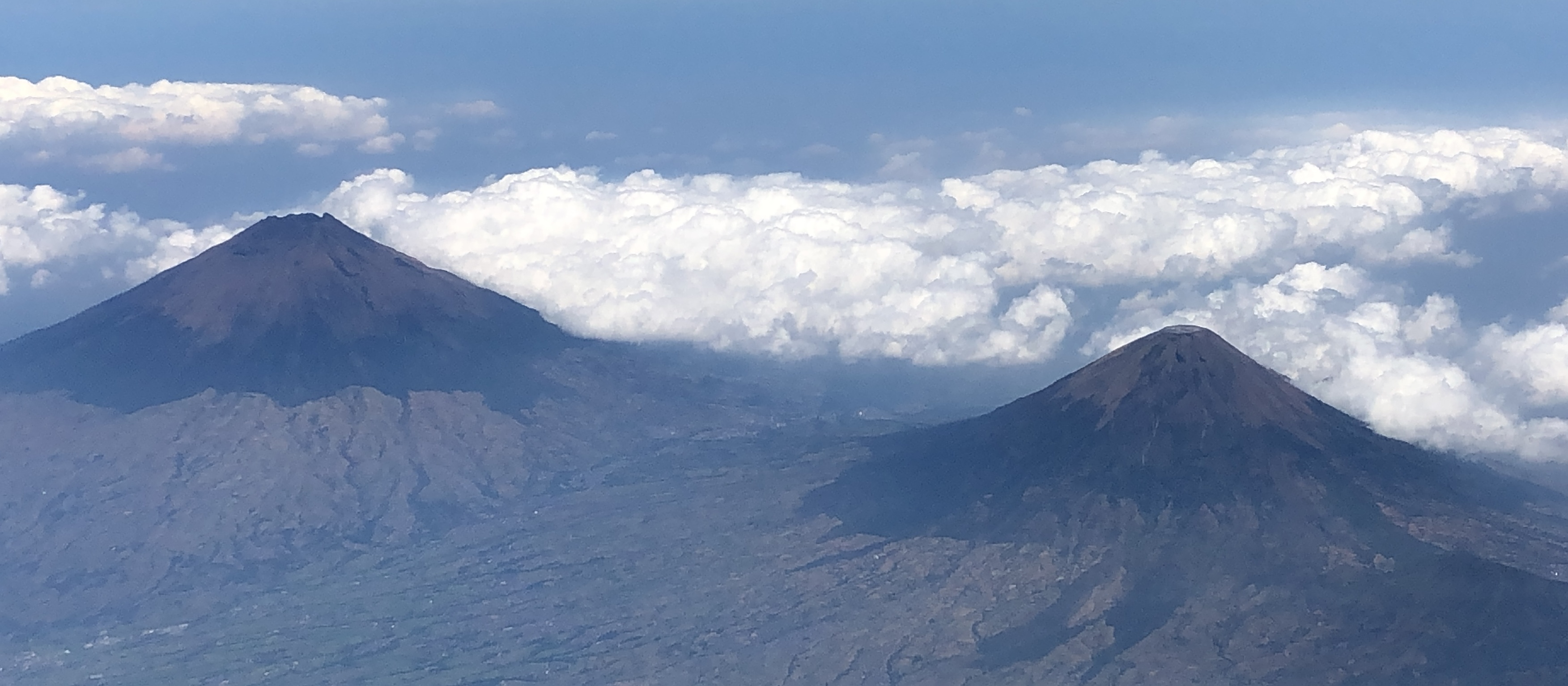
A photo of Mount Sumbing (left) and Mount Sindoro (right) taken from a plane

The template for the drawing originates from Yogyakartan artist Tino Sidin, the host of the children's drawing program Gemar Menggambar, which aired on TVRI in the 1980s.

One of the drawings produced by Sidin contained the now iconic twin mountains and rice fields. Sidin's artwork proved to be so popular that Indonesian schoolchildren began to imitate the drawing, with teachers using his work as a reference for their students in the classroom. Mount Sindoro and Mount Sumbing, located in Central Java, are sometimes cited as the real-life basis for the drawing.

== Criticism ==
Several critics have argued that the twin mountain drawing highlights issues in the educational system in Indonesia.

Indonesian teachers and schools are perceived as monotonous, as students almost unanimously decide to draw twin mountains, and critics argue this shows that schools do not promote diversity and creativity. Many believe that more action should be taken by teachers to promote creativity among their students. The monotonous nature of schools also causes students to fear being different, forcing them to conform and draw the same imagery as their peers.

The phenomenon also shows the dogmatic characteristics of Indonesian teachers, who are not open-minded to more creative choices made by students. Often, students are only allowed to follow the teacher's example, and critics argue that teachers should practice open-mindedness to allow students to produce imagery other than the twin mountains, when asked to draw natural features.

== See also ==
- Cool S, a similar phenomenon of a universally-drawn picture.
