= New York City: the 51st State =

1969 NYC mayoral platform for statehood

- Leader: Norman Mailer (Mayor), Jimmy Breslin (City Council President)
- Founded: 1968
- Dissolved: 1969
- Succeeded by: None
- Ideology: Secession of New York City from New York State/United States; Local Autonomy ("Power to the Neighborhood")
- Political position: Left, libertarian
- International affiliation: None

New York City: the 51st State was the platform of the Norman Mailer–Jimmy Breslin candidacy in the 1969 New York City Democratic Mayoral Primary election. Mailer, a novelist, journalist, and filmmaker, and Breslin, an author and at the time a New York City newspaper columnist, proposed that the five New York City boroughs should secede from New York State, and become the 51st state of the U.S.

Mailer topped the ticket as candidate for Mayor; his running mate, Breslin, sought the office of City Council President. Their platform featured placing city governmental control in the hands of the neighborhoods, and offered unique and creative – if impractical and even logistically impossible – solutions to air pollution, traffic congestion, school overcrowding, and crime.

After a strong grassroots campaign, the ticket entered the primary on June 17, 1969 as decided underdogs. They finished second to last, garnering a citywide total of 41,288 votes, 5% of the total votes cast.

== History of the campaign ==
In the 1960s, New York City suffered from economic problems and rising crime rates, which continued a steep uphill climb through the decade. The old manufacturing jobs that supported generations of uneducated immigrants were disappearing by deindustrialization, millions of middle class residents were fleeing to the suburbs, and public sector workers had won the right to unionize. Many of the candidates in the 1969 Democratic mayoralty primary race – three-time mayor Robert F. Wagner Jr., long-time party worker and City Comptroller Mario Procaccino, Bronx Borough President Herman Badillo, and Congressman James H. Scheuer – were familiar, uninspiring mainstream politicians who offered few new or novel ideas on how to solve the city's problems.

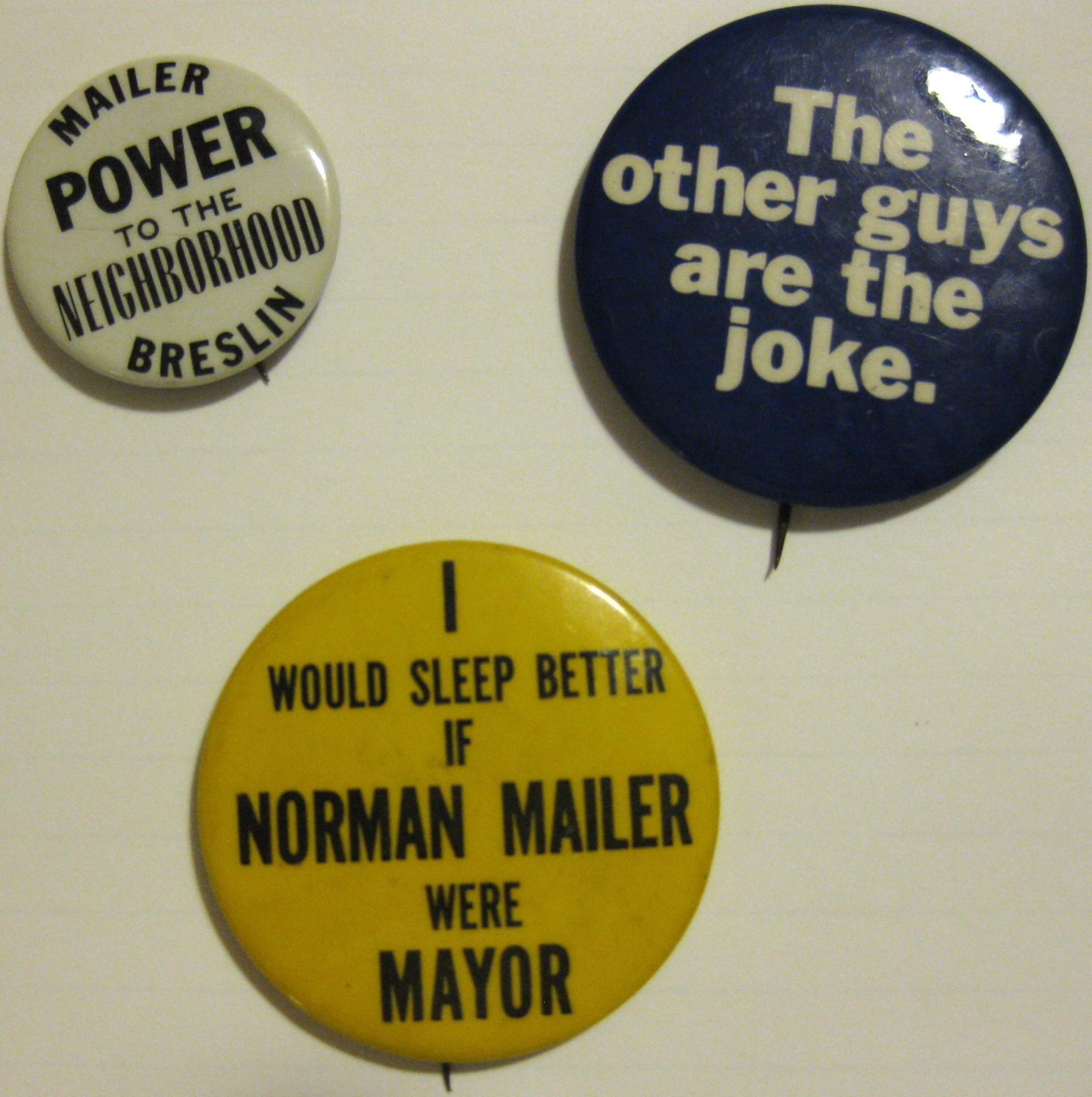
Mailer–Breslin campaign buttons, 1969

Mailer’s vociferous candidacy ("New York Gets an Imagination – or It Dies!") convinced opinionated Queens newspaper columnist Jimmy Breslin to abandon his own mayoral quest and join the higher profile Mailer as his City Council President running mate. In a Time interview published four days before the primary, Mailer called himself a "left conservative" – left because he believed the city's problems demanded radical answers, conservative because he had little faith in centralized government. Mailer said that, if he were to win the primary and be elected in November, "a small miracle would have happened. At that moment the city would have declared that it had lost faith in the old ways of solving political problems and that it wished to embark on a new conception of politics."

Giving authority to local residents united by history, interests, or ethnicity, would create "some real power to the neighborhoods ... such as power with their local boards of education, power to decide about the style and quality and number of the police force they want and are willing to pay for, power over the Department of Sanitation, power over their parks."

More dramatically, Mailer wanted to restore the sense of small-town identity that had become lost in the anonymity of city life. "The energies of the people of New York at present have no purchase on their own natural wit and intelligence," he said. "They have no purpose other than to watch with a certain gallows humor the progressive deterioration of their city." Under Mailer's plan for independent neighborhoods, however, "those energies could begin to work for their deepest and most private and most passionate ideas about the nature of government, the nature of man's relation to his own immediate society."

== Platform ==
Handbill for the campaign (front), 1969

(The contents of this section are adapted from the Mailer-Breslin campaign literature.)

The planks of the Mailer-Breslin platform included:

- Statehood – New York City would be split off from the rest of New York State, and achieve independent statehood as the 51st State of the U.S. The campaign sought to free the city from the control of "upstate legislators who don't care about the city but control our schools, police, housing, and money." For a new state to be carved out of one already in existence requires the approval of both the old state legislature and the U.S. Congress. New states have been created from the territory of older states before: in 1792, Kentucky was formed from part of Virginia, and West Virginia broke away from Virginia and became a state in 1863. Mailer proposed that the first step, following his election, should be a citywide referendum on the question of statehood for the city.
- Taxes – In 1969, New York City taxpayers paid the state and federal governments $14 billion ($92 billion in 2024 dollars), and got only $3 billion back ($20 billion in 2024 dollars). The creation of the 51st State would help correct this imbalance, and bring about $2 billion ($13 billion in 2024 dollars) in additional revenue to the city. In addition, a casino would be built on either Randall's Island, Roosevelt Island, or Coney Island, with tax revenues going directly to the City-State.
- Transportation – All private cars would be banned from Manhattan Island. Buses and taxicabs would be permitted, with the number of cabs increased. Parking lots would be built outside Manhattan at strategic locations. A monorail, built around the circumference of Manhattan, would service these lots, stopping also at rail stations and water ferry terminals. A free bus and jitney service would operate in Midtown, the city's most congested area. Publicly owned bicycles would be available to all at no cost.
- Pollution – The elimination of private cars from Manhattan Island would reduce pollution there by 60%. All vehicles and incinerators in the city would be required to have pollution control devices. Sweet Sundays (q.v.) would give the city breathing room once a month.
- Education – The neighborhoods would have complete control over their school systems, including which teachers to hire, what curricula to teach, and what grading and testing methods would be used. Autonomy could include, for example, "vest-pocket campuses built by students in abandoned buildings, restoring a sense of personal involvement that is lost in the large university campuses."

Handbill for the campaign (back), 1969

- Housing – Neighborhoods would manage all rent-controlled housing. The City-State would fund programs of rehabilitation – not demolition – of existing buildings, along with programs to aid in eventual home ownership for tenants. On-the-job trainees would restore good buildings which would otherwise be razed.
- Welfare – Since welfare is a national problem, every effort would be made to have the Federal government absorb 90% of the cost of welfare. All welfare programs would be administered by the neighborhoods, eliminating the 15% of welfare funds spent on welfare case investigations, the thinking being that neighbors know best which neighbors need/deserve public assistance. The City-State would fund the neighborhoods to employ residents in local daycare centers, housing rehabilitation, and recreational programs, thus keeping thousands off the welfare rolls.
- Crime – Local neighborhoods would know best how to control crime in their communities by employing policemen who have the respect of the community because they live there. The City-State would fund neighborhoods to administer their own crime prevention programs, and would aid them only if they so desired.
- Sweet Sundays – One Sunday per month would be designated "Sweet Sunday," when every form of mechanical transportation – including elevators – would be halted. Mailer's idea was to clear the air of pollution and provide a carefree day during which citizens could gather and decompress. As Sam Smith, editor of The Progressive Review put it, Sweet Sundays "would allow human beings to rest and talk to each other and the air can purify itself. Mailer and Breslin understood that real politics is not just a matter of management but a collective expression of a community’s soul."

== Primary election results ==
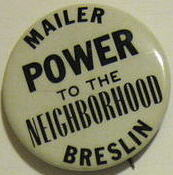
The campaign's "Power to the Neighborhood" concept placed authority for local governance in the hands of neighborhood residents.

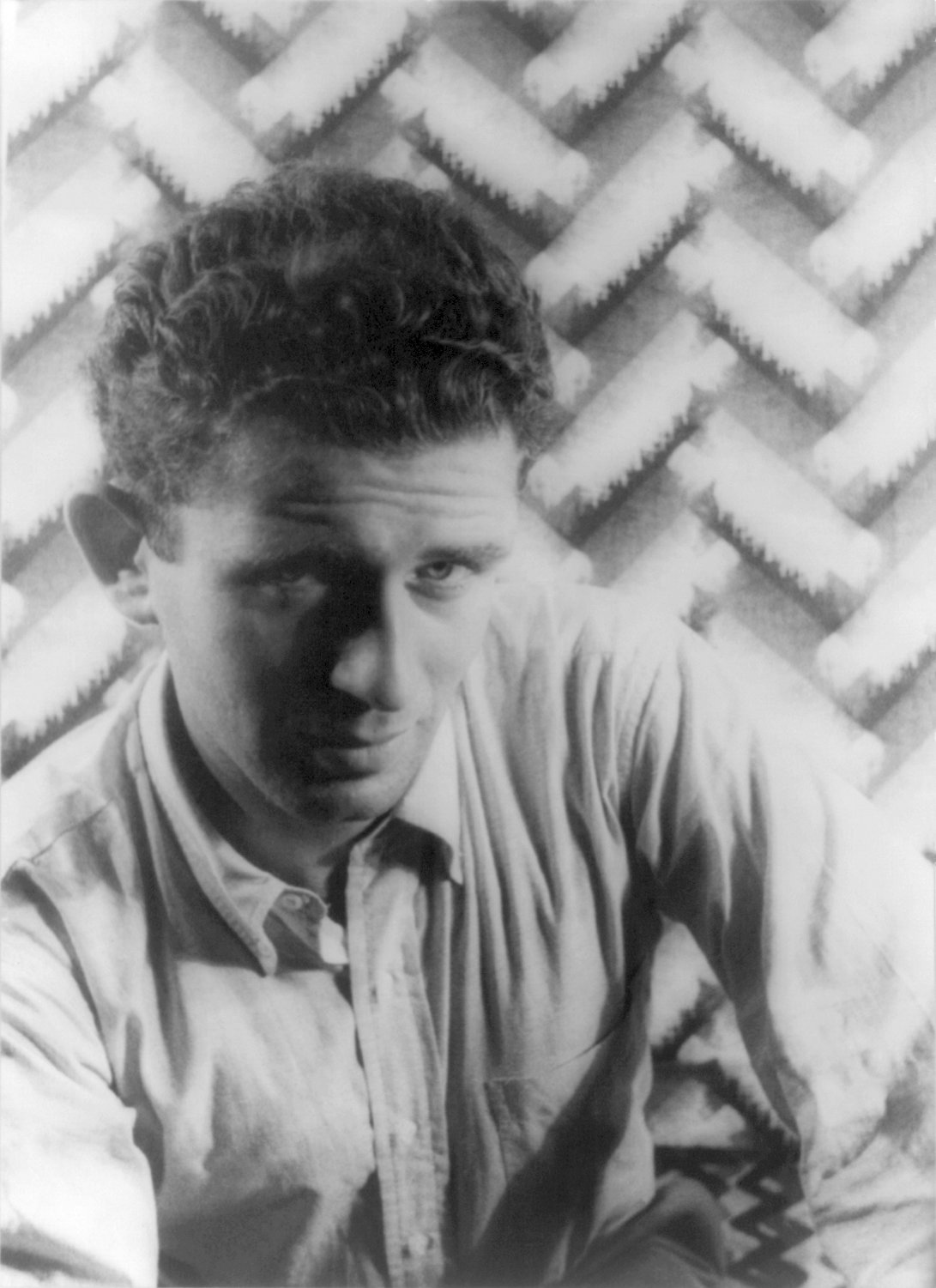
Norman Mailer photographed by Carl Van Vechten in 1948

Perhaps the most significant outcome of the Mailer-Breslin campaign was that they did not finish last. That dubious honor belonged to James H. Scheuer, who finished 1,878 votes behind Mailer. Mailer garnered over 10,000 more votes than Scheuer in Manhattan, and also outpolled him on Staten Island.

As the result of the fragmented, five-candidate field, the 1969 Democratic Primary made for one of the most unusual elections since the conglomeration of greater New York. The incumbent Republican Mayor (John V. Lindsay) and a former Democratic incumbent (Robert F. Wagner, Jr.) both lost their parties' primaries. Mario Procaccino won with less than 33% of the vote against Mailer and three other opponents, which inspired the use of runoffs in future primaries. The complete Democratic Primary results:

1969 Democratic primary
	Manhattan	The Bronx	Brooklyn	Queens	Staten Island	Total
Mario Procaccino	26,804	50,465	87,650	79,002	11,628	255,529
percentage	16%	34%	36%	40%	52%	33%
Robert F. Wagner, Jr.	40,978	33,442	81,833	61,244	6,967	224,464
percentage	25%	23%	33%	31%	31%	29%
Herman Badillo	74,809	48,841	52,866	37,880	2,769	217,165
percentage	45%	33%	22%	19%	12%	28%
Norman Mailer	17,372	4,214	10,299	8,700	703	41,288
percentage	10%	3%	4%	4%	3%	5%
James H. Scheuer	7,117	10,788	11,942	8,994	509	39,350
percentage	4%	7%	5%	5%	2%	5%
						777,796
