= 1969 New York City mayoral election =

- November 4, 1969
- Registered: 3,026,745
- Turnout: 2,458,203; 81.21% (▲0.39 pp)
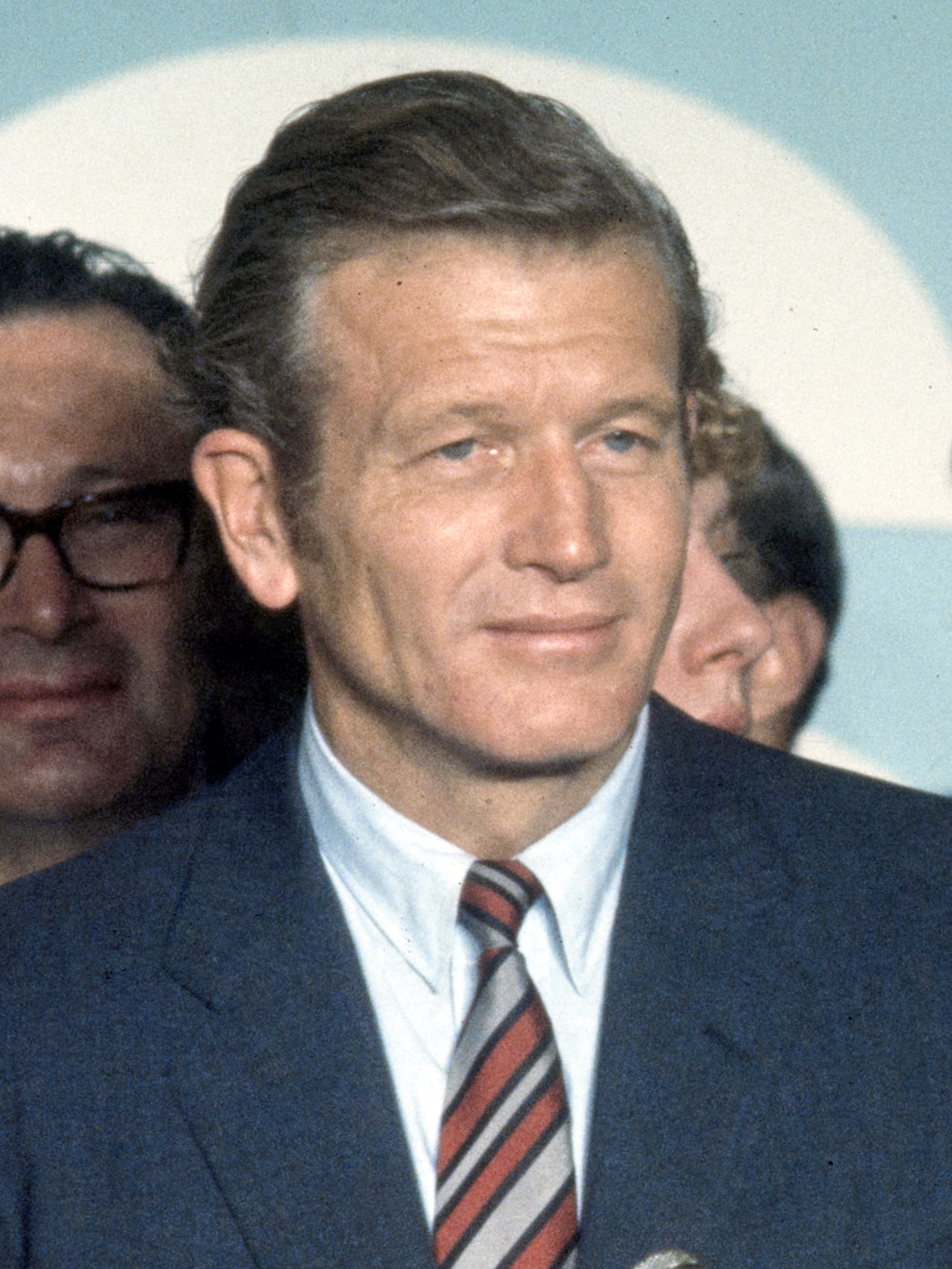

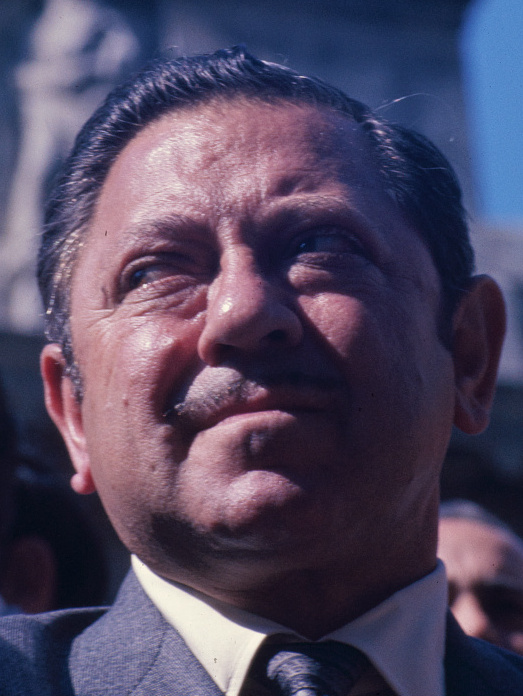

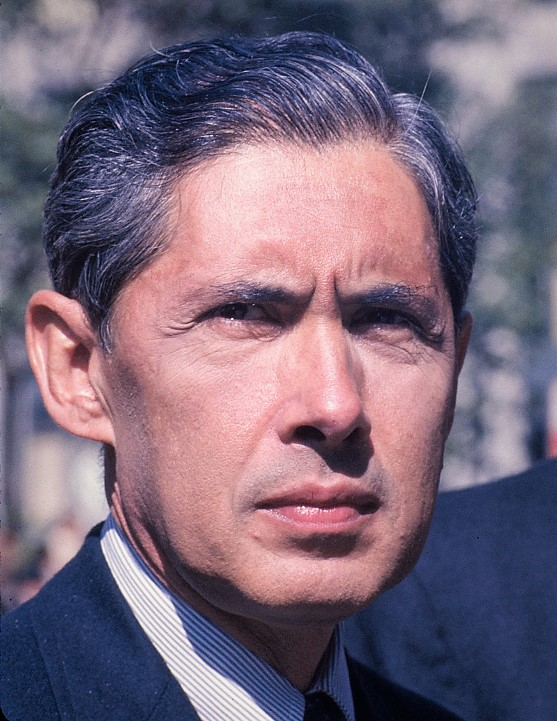
Candidate	John Lindsay	Mario Procaccino	John J. Marchi
Party	Liberal	Democratic	Republican
Alliance		Civil Service	Conservative
Popular vote	1,012,633	831,772	542,411
Percentage	42.4%	34.8%	22.7%
- Results by borough Procaccino—40–50% Marchi—60–70% Lindsay—30–40% Lindsay—60–70%
Mayor before election
John Lindsay
Republican
Elected Mayor
John Lindsay
Liberal

The 1969 New York City mayoral election occurred on Tuesday, November 4, 1969, with incumbent Liberal Party Mayor John Lindsay elected to a second term. Lindsay defeated the Democratic candidate, New York City Comptroller Mario Procaccino, and the Republican candidate, state senator John Marchi.

Lindsay received 42.36% of the vote to Procaccino's 34.79%, a Liberal victory margin of 7.57%. Marchi finished a distant third with 22.69%.

In one of the most unusual primary seasons since the consolidation of greater New York, the incumbent Lindsay and former mayor Robert F. Wagner Jr. lost their respective Republican and Democratic primaries. Lindsay, defeated narrowly by state senator John J. Marchi of Staten Island for the Republican nomination, gained ballot access to the general election via the Liberal Party, which had co-nominated him in 1965. Procaccino won the Democratic primary with less than 33% of the vote against four other candidates: Wagner, Bronx Borough President Herman Badillo, Congressman James H. Scheuer, and author Norman Mailer, who ran on a platform proposing secession from the state of New York. In his criticism of Lindsay, Procaccino coined the term “limousine liberal,” a political epithet for the “repellent hypocrisy of elites” who promoted social reforms and tolerated disorder while remaining untouched by its fallout thanks to their wealth, according to historian Steve Fraser.

This is one of two mayoral elections where the winning candidate carried a minority of the boroughs, the other being the 2001 election. This is also one of two mayoral elections where the winning candidate was not on the Democratic or Republican ballot line, the other being the 1950 election.

With Lindsay receiving 1,012,633 votes, the 1969 mayoral election was the last in which a candidate exceeded one million votes until the 2025 election, when Democrat Zohran Mamdani received 1,114,184 votes.

== Background ==
=== 1965 election ===
Incumbent mayor John Lindsay was elected in 1965 as a Republican with Liberal Party support. However, Lindsay failed to win a majority of the vote, primarily due to the rise of the Conservative Party, which polled over thirteen percent of the vote behind candidate William F. Buckley Jr. Liberal Party support, which typically went to the Democratic Party nominee, was therefore crucial to Lindsay's win.

=== Race relations ===
In summer 1967, New York was one of many American cities rocked by urban riots, with four killed after an off-duty NYPD officer shot and killed a Puerto Rican man, Renaldo Rodriguez, who lunged at him with a knife. In response to the unrest throughout the country, President Lyndon B. Johnson established the National Advisory Commission on Civil Disorders. Lindsay served on the Commission and used it as an opportunity to publicly campaign for urban renewal, visiting riot-damaged sites accompanied by national and local press, and he was influential in its final report.

In April 1968, one month after the report was released, rioting broke out in more than 100 American cities following the assassination of Martin Luther King Jr. In New York, however, Lindsay was credited with averting a crisis when he traveled personally to the Black-majority neighborhood of Harlem to tell residents that he regretted King's death and was working to end urban poverty. His administration also sponsored the 1969 Harlem Cultural Festival, at which Lindsay was introduced as "our blue-eyed soul brother."

=== Blizzard of 1969 ===
On February 10, 1969, New York City received 15 inches (38 cm) of snow and in one day alone, 14 people died and 68 were injured. For three days, the city was completely paralyzed; streets, subways, airports, and schools were suspended. Lindsay faced repeated criticism during and after the blizzard that he had prioritized his native borough of Manhattan over the four other boroughs, particularly Queens, which remained unplowed over one week after the storm. The criticism prompted Lindsay to visit Queens but, after his limousine became trapped in Rego Park, he was forced to abandon it in favor of a four-wheel truck and was heckled by local residents.

Ultimately, 42 people died as a result of the snowstorm, half of them in Queens, and 288 were injured. Biographer Vincent J. Cannato attributed Lindsay's failed handling of the snowstorm to a hesitation to exceed his budget and potentially, deliberate sabotage by the city's sanitation workers, who held a grudge against Lindsay for his heavy-handed negotiation tactics during their 1968 strike.

== Republican primary ==
=== Candidates ===
- John Lindsay, incumbent mayor since 1966
- John J. Marchi, state senator from Staten Island

==== Withdrawn ====
- Vito P. Battista, State Assemblyman from Brooklyn and perennial candidate (ran for Controller; endorsed Marchi)

=== Results ===
Marchi claimed victory at 12:40 a.m. in a speech claiming that the primary "mark[ed] the beginning of [a] revitalized Republican Party."

In conceding the results, Lindsay proclaimed that they were "not the voice of the Republicans of this city ... not the voice of the Democrats ... not the voice of New York." He pledged to wage a new campaign against "the twin horsemen of doubt and fear" with a "new coalition" in city politics.

1969 New York City Republican primary
Party	Candidate	Votes	%
Republican	John J. Marchi	113,698	51.43%
Republican	John Lindsay (incumbent)	107,366	48.57%
Total votes		221,064	100.00%

==== Results by borough ====
1969 Republican primary
	Manhattan	The Bronx	Brooklyn	Queens	Staten Island	Total
[Lindsay minus Marchi]	+ 31,779	– 3,910	– 13,119	– 13,811	– 7,271	– 6,332
John V. Lindsay	44,236	12,222	20,575	26,658	3,675	107,366
John J. Marchi	12,457	16,132	33,694	40,649	10,946	113,698
						221,064

== Democratic primary ==
=== Candidates ===
- Herman Badillo, Bronx Borough President
- Norman Mailer, author
- Mario Procaccino, New York City Comptroller
- James H. Scheuer, U.S. Representative from the Bronx
- Robert F. Wagner Jr., U.S. Ambassador to Spain and former mayor of New York City (1954–65)

==== Withdrawn ====
- Vincent L. Broderick, former New York Police Commissioner and United States Attorney for the Southern District of New York
- Hugh Carey, U.S. Representative from Brooklyn (ran for City Council President; endorsed Wagner)
- Norman Frank, public relations advisor to the Patrolmen's Benevolent Association (endorsed Procaccino)
- Robert A. Low, member of the City Council (ran for City Council President; endorsed Carey)
- John M. Murphy, U.S. Representative from Staten Island
- Paul R. Screvane, former President of the City Council (endorsed Wagner)

=== Results ===
1969 New York City Democratic primary
Party	Candidate	Votes	%
Democratic	Mario Procaccino	255,529	32.85%
Democratic	Robert F. Wagner Jr.	224,464	28.86%
Democratic	Herman Badillo	217,165	27.92%
Democratic	Norman Mailer	41,288	5.31%
Democratic	James H. Scheuer	39,350	5.06%
Total votes		777,796	100.00%

==== Results by borough ====
1969 Democratic primary
	Manhattan	The Bronx	Brooklyn	Queens	Staten Island	Total
Mario Procaccino	26,804	50,465	87,650	79,002	11,628	255,529
percentage	16%	34%	36%	40%	52%	33%
Robert F. Wagner Jr.	40,978	33,442	81,833	61,244	6,967	224,464
percentage	25%	23%	33%	31%	31%	29%
Herman Badillo	74,809	48,841	52,866	37,880	2,769	217,165
percentage	45%	33%	22%	19%	12%	28%
Norman Mailer	17,372	4,214	10,299	8,700	703	41,288
percentage	10%	3%	4%	4%	3%	5%
James H. Scheuer	7,117	10,788	11,942	8,994	509	39,350
percentage	4%	7%	5%	5%	2%	5%
						777,796

== General election ==
=== Candidates ===
- John Lindsay, incumbent mayor since 1966 (Liberal and Independent)
- John J. Marchi, state senator from Staten Island (Republican and Conservative)
- Mario Procaccino, New York City Comptroller (Democratic and Civil Service)
- Rasheed Storey (Communist)

Lindsay was also nominated on an independent ticket, while Procaccino received the Civil Service ballot line, and Marchi received the Conservative Party ballot line.

=== Campaign ===
During the campaign, Lindsay made a conscious effort to appeal to Jewish New Yorkers through symbolic gestures. In late September, he gave an extraordinary reception to Prime Minister of Israel Golda Meir in a sukkah, emphasizing his support for the State of Israel in the Arab–Israeli conflict.

=== Results ===
Turnout dropped to 2.4 million from 2.6 million in 1965. (In the same election, Lindsay's 1965 opponent Abe Beame was easily returned to his old job of Comptroller.)

1969 New York City mayoral election
Party	Candidate	Votes	%	±%
Liberal	John Lindsay (incumbent)	872,660	36.50%	▲25.5
Independent	John Lindsay (incumbent)	139,973	5.85%	
Total	John Lindsay (incumbent)	1,012,633	42.35%	▼2.6
Democratic	Mario Procaccino	774,708	32.40%	▼6.1
Civil Service	Mario Procaccino	57,064	2.39%	▼0.1
Total	Mario Procaccino	831,772	34.79%	▼6.2
Republican	John J. Marchi	329,506	13.78%	
Conservative	John J. Marchi	212,905	8.91%	▼5.5
Total	John J. Marchi	542,411	22.69%	N/A
Communist	Rasheed Storey	4,018	0.17%	N/A
Total votes		2,390,834	100.00%	

- By themselves, the straight Democratic and Republican lines added up to less than 50% of the mayoral vote (1,104,214 or 46.2%), but more than the total vote for Lindsay (1,012,633 or 42.4%).
- Procaccino's general election votes on the Democratic line alone (774,708) were slightly fewer than the total votes received by all candidates in the Democratic primary (777,796).
- Lindsay's general election votes on the Liberal line alone (872,660) exceeded Procaccino's total votes on all lines (831,772).

==== Results by borough ====
Reflecting the three-way split in the race, three candidates garnered double-digit support citywide, and the five boroughs split between the three candidates. Lindsay scored a major victory in Manhattan with 67.1% of the vote, while also winning a narrow plurality in Queens with 36.3% of the vote. Procaccino won pluralities by small margins in Brooklyn and the Bronx. Marchi won Staten Island with 62.0% of the vote.

1969 General Election	party	Manhattan	The Bronx	Brooklyn	Queens	Richmond [Staten Is.]	Total	%
John V. Lindsay	Liberal - Independent	328,564	161,953	256,046	249,330	16,740	1,012,633	42.4%
John V. Lindsay	Liberal - Independent	67.1%	40.1%	36.0%	36.3%	17.5%	1,012,633	42.4%
Mario Procaccino	Democratic - Civil Service Fusion	99,460	165,647	301,324	245,783	19,558	831,772	34.8%
Mario Procaccino	Democratic - Civil Service Fusion	20.3%	41.0%	42.4%	35.8%	20.5%	831,772	34.8%
John Marchi	Republican - Conservative	61,539	76,711	152,933	192,008	59,220	542,411	22.7%
John Marchi	Republican - Conservative	12.6%	19.0%	21.5%	27.9%	62.0%	542,411	22.7%
subtotal		489,563	404,311	710,303	687,121	95,518	2,386,816	99.8%
Rasheed Storey	Communist						4,018	0.2%
T O T A L							2,390,834	100.0%
