= Jon Naar =

American photographer

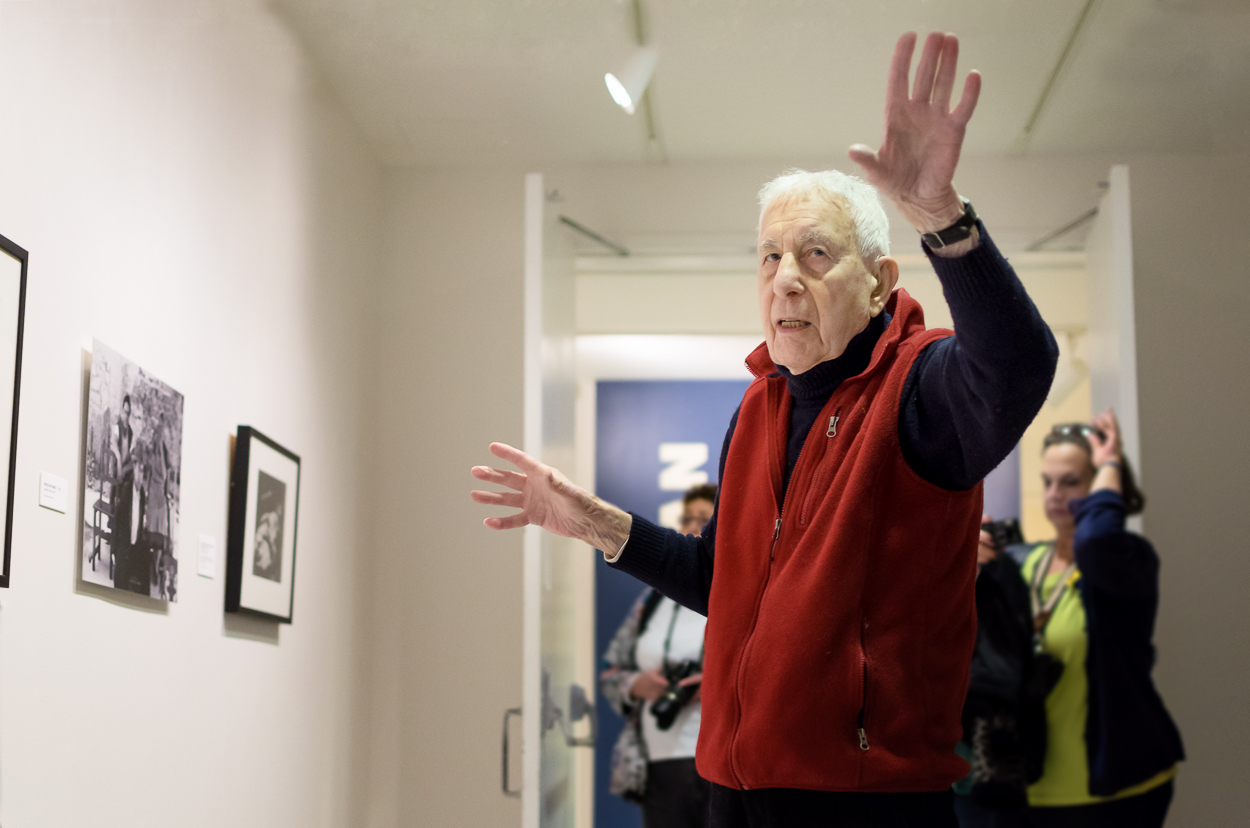
- At the New Jersey State Museum in 2013
- Born: May 5, 1920; London, England
- Died: November 30, 2017 (aged 97); Maryland, U.S.
- Occupations: Photographer, author

Jon Naar (May 5, 1920 – November 30, 2017) was an English-American author and photographer celebrated for his pioneering images of New York City graffiti in the 1970s, and for portraits of Andy Warhol and other celebrities, including the British Prime Minister. Active through his late nineties, Naar had a multifaceted career as an intelligence officer in World War II; a globe-trotting marketing executive during the postwar years; and an environmentalist, with 12 published books to his credit.

== Early life and education ==
Born in London in 1920, Naar graduated at 15 from the private Mill Hill School. Too young to attend an English university, he crossed the Channel to study French at the Sorbonne, and German at the University of Vienna. At this point, Naar had yet to develop a special interest in photography, but his artistic and design sensibilities were being shaped by his Parisian influences, particularly the street photographs of Brassaï. Four years later, his matriculation at the University of London cut short by the outbreak of World War II, Naar was conscripted. Thanks to prior experience in the Officers' Training Corps at Mill Hill, he would spend the next six years on intelligence work, including service with the British Special Operations Executive, on clandestine assignments that took him through the Middle East and Italy. At war's end, by-then Major Naar emigrated to New York City and secured American citizenship.

== Career ==
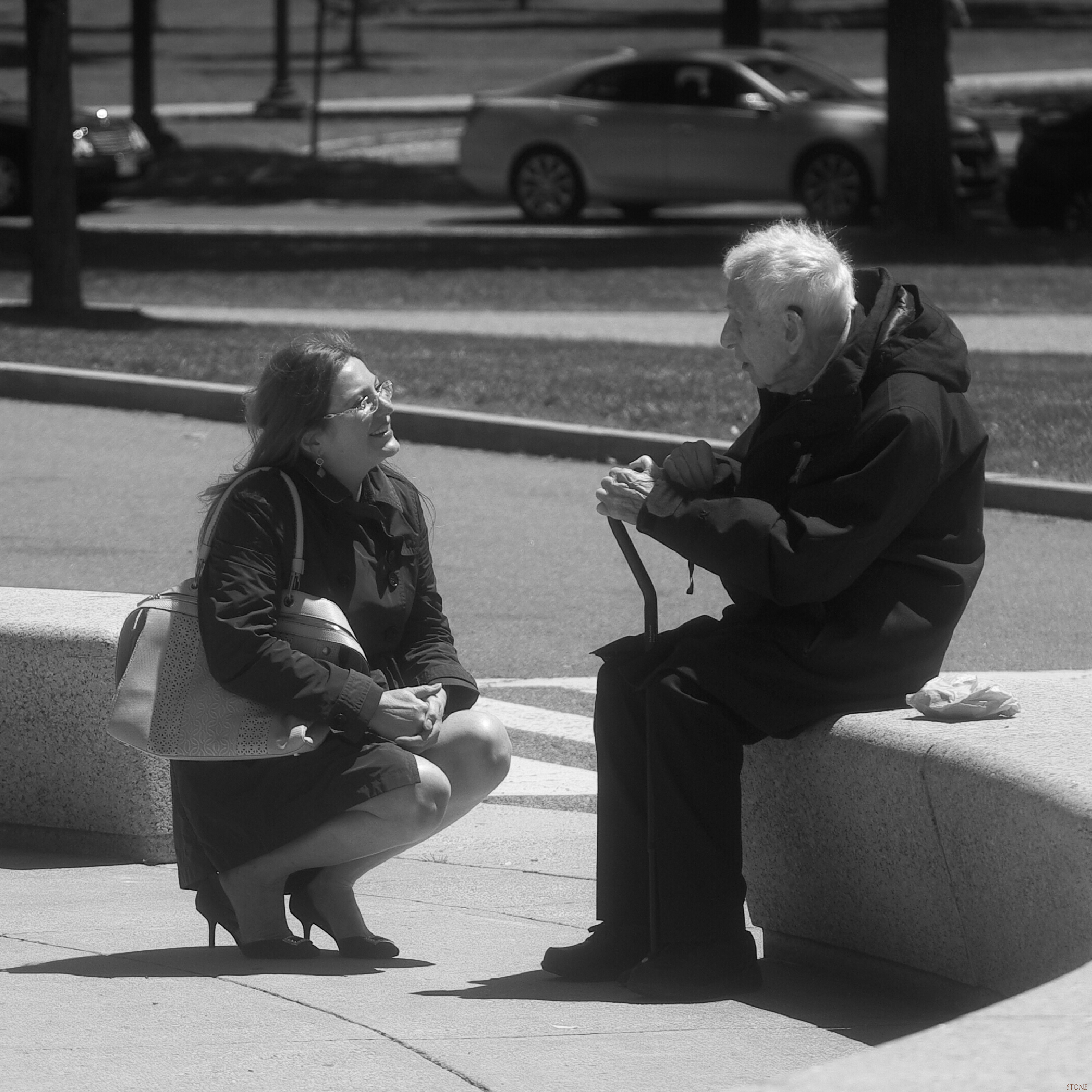
A fan shares a quiet moment with Jon Naar in 2017

Over the next decade and a half, Naar worked as a medical science writer and editor in the Public Interest department of Columbia-Presbyterian Hospital, then for five years as managing editor of the World Wide Medical News service, a division of the ethical pharmaceutical advertising agency William Douglas McAdams. From 1957, he directed international marketing for Pharmacraft Laboratories, a division of Joseph E. Seagram Corporation. In 1964, after a year in Munich as general manager of the American-French cosmetic company Germaine Monteil, he launched his career as a professional photographer.

Through the 1950s, armed with a Super Ikonta rangefinder camera and later a Praktica single-lens reflex, Naar had been developing his eye as a "weekend" photographer, roving his Greenwich Village neighborhood and seeking out subject matter while on foreign corporate assignments. It was not until influential photographers Nickolas Muray and André Kertész—both impressed by his hobbyist portfolio—offered encouragement, that he resolved to seek wider exposure as a photographer. A series of street scenes Naar shot in Mexico City in 1962 was featured in a 1963 solo exhibition in Coyoacan titled "El Ojo de un Estranjero." His 23-page photo essay on Germany, 20 years after the death of Adolf Hitler, appeared in the Italian design magazine Domus. New York Times critic Joseph Deschin, reviewing Naar's 1965 one-man show at New York University's Loeb Student Center, extolled his "flair for design and an eye for the unexpected ... his pictures generate the kind of excitement that one associates with discovery of newness in the familiar." The striking image "Shadows of Children on Swings" was selected by Ivan Dmitri for the Metropolitan Museum's "Photography in the Fine Arts" exhibition, and for its permanent collection. Within the span of a few years, Naar had not only transformed himself into a professional photographer, but was in demand as a contributor to major publications like The New York Times, The Saturday Evening Post, Vogue, Fortune, Elle, and Schöner Wohnen.

If Naar had a speciality at that time, it was photographing artists and architects amidst their creative (and created) surroundings. One of his earliest and most enduring images featured a young Andy Warhol sprawled on a red plush sofa, surrounded by glistening objects in the infamous "Silver Factory." Other subjects over the years included Luis Barragán, Marcel Breuer, Christo, Alexander Liberman, Heinz Mack, Marino Marini, Henry Moore, Barnett Newman, Saul Steinberg, and Günther Uecker. His portrait of Josef Albers accompanied that artist's obituary in the New York Times.

By the 1970s, Naar's reputation was well established and he was redirecting his energies toward on-location corporate work for a diverse range of clients. Then in 1972, a commission for the London-based design firm Pentagram morphed into a full-length book project, with the 1974 release of The Faith of Graffiti (UK title Watching My Name Go By)—the first book-length examination of New York City graffiti art. Featuring an introduction by novelist Norman Mailer, the controversial collection would become "like a bible to later graffiti artists," in the words of Brian Wallis, chief curator at New York's International Center of Photography. Naar "legitimized" graffiti "a decade earlier than anyone else, and he came at it with a graphic design sensibility—he understood color and composition and bold design." It is for this groundbreaking series that Naar himself remains in demand, with numerous recent retrospectives and a 2007 collection, The Birth of Graffiti, which includes 130 previously unpublished photographs from the original assignment.

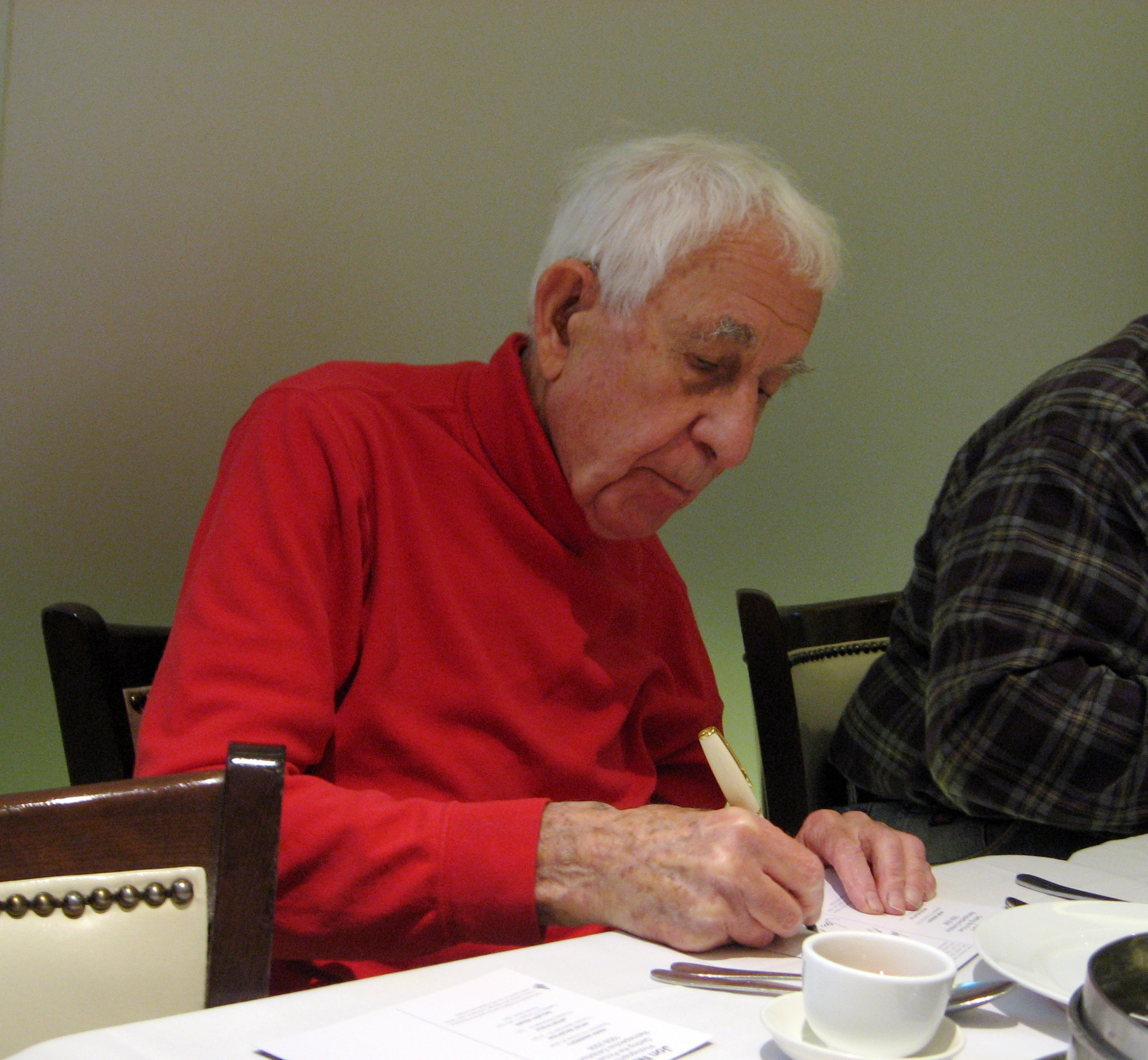
Signing autographs in 2008

Other book projects followed, providing Naar with an opportunity to return to researching and writing on scientific topics, especially environmental themes. Jacques Cousteau wrote the introduction to Naar's 1973 book, Design for a Limited Planet, which featured interviews and photographs with pioneers of solar energy in the American Southwest and sold over 100,000 copies. As an early advocate of solar energy—he helped mount the first solar collectors on the roof of the White House—Naar later became president of the New York Metropolitan Solar Energy Society, and served for two years (1996–1998) as deputy director of renewable energy programs at the United States Agency for International Development. As a consultant, he worked with entities such as NRDC (Natural Resources Defense Council) and SELCO (Solar Electric Light Company India). In 1991, the American Library Association included Design for a Livable Planet (coauthored by Naar and his son Alex) among its "Best Books of the Year for Young Adults". His 2005 survey collection, Getting the Picture, was included in the "Best Designed Books 2006" exhibition at the Stedelijk Museum, Amsterdam.

From 2000 to mid-2017, Naar was based in Trenton, New Jersey. In 2013, the New Jersey State Museum mounted an exhibition of his work entitled "Jon Naar: Signature Photography."

== Personal life ==
At the end of World War II, he married American OSS officer Ellen Hartt. He later married Ruth Kurle and Beverly Russell, which all ended in divorce.

== Major exhibitions ==
- 1963 Galeria Coyote Flaco, Coyoacan, Mexico, El Ojo de un Estranjero
- 1965 Metropolitan Museum, New York, Photography in the Fine Arts
- 1976 Musee d'Art Moderne, Centre Pompidou, Paris, France
- 1976 Fondation Cartier, Paris
- 1977 Museum of Modern Art, New York
- 2005-6 Jan Cunen Museum, Oss, the Netherlands, Jon Naar Retrospective
- 2007 Museum of Fine Arts, Houston, Texas, Artists, Designers and Architects
- 2008 Rider University, Lawrenceville, New Jersey, Retrospective
- 2013 New Jersey State Museum, Trenton, New Jersey, Jon Naar: Signature Photography

== Published works (partial listing) ==
- The Story of America. Picture Progress, 1950 (winner of the Thomas Alvah Edison Award for Writing, 1950)
- (with Mervyn Kurlansky and Norman Mailer) The Faith of Graffiti. Praeger Publishers, 1974; Mathews Miller Dunbar, 1974 (as Watching My Name Go By); Du Chene, 1974 (as Les Graffitis de New York); HarperCollins, 2009 (expanded 30th anniversary edition)
- (with Norma Skurka) Design for a Limited Planet: Living with Natural Energy. Ballantine Books, 1976
- (with Molly Siple) Living in One Room. Vintage/Random House, 1976
- Your Space: How to Put It Together for Practically Nothing. St. Martin's Press, 1979
- The New Wind Power. Penguin Books, 1982
- Design for a Livable Planet: How You Can Help Clean Up the Environment. HarperCollins, 1990
- (with Alex Naar) This Land Is Your Land: A Guide to North America's Endangered Ecosystems. HarperCollins Perennial, 1992
- Getting The Picture: Re-Discovering My Photography. Terra Lannoo, 2005
- The Birth of Graffiti. Prestel, 2007
