= Clarence Francis =

American business executive

Clarence Francis (December 1, 1888 – December 22, 1985) was an American business executive and internationally recognized expert on food.

== Early life ==
He was born in Staten Island in 1888. Upon graduating from Amherst College in 1910 he went to New York City intending to apply for work at Standard Oil. By mistake, Francis went to the wrong office and soon found himself working for the Corn Products Refining Company, a small food manufacturing firm. This inauspicious beginning led to a lifelong interest in the food industry. By the time Francis retired from the General Foods Corporation in 1954 he had risen to become chairman of the board of directors. After absorbing an initial $17 million loss in the frozen foods sector, Francis was able to turn a profit for General Foods in this very important market.

== Career ==
After working for Corn Products and Ralston Purina, Francis joined the Postum Company (later General Foods) in 1924. He became executive vice president in 1931, president in 1935, and then chairman of the board in 1943.

In addition to his work in the food industry, Francis also served as a government consultant. By 1933 he was recognized as an expert on food production and distribution. When the National Recovery Administration, one of President Franklin D. Roosevelt’s New Deal agencies, was created to establish codes to regulate business operations, Francis was hired as a consultant to help draft codes for the food industry. The successful conclusion of this task led to further demands for his services. Between 1940 and 1943 he assisted in defense mobilization; from 1943 to 1945 he led a committee that studied the food services at several naval bases in the United States; he studied manpower training and utilization in the U.S. Department of Defense from 1951-52; and he evaluated the Mutual Security Program in 1953.

In 1949, Francis was appointed by Secretary of Interior Julius A. Krug to chair an official United States Citizens Committee for the United Nations Scientific Conference on Conservation and Utilization of Resources, held in August of that year at Lake Success, New York.

Francis’ consultant work required taking extended leaves from his work at the General Foods Corporation. After his retirement in 1954 he was able to devote most of his time to government service. He became a special consultant to President Dwight D. Eisenhower with the responsibility of disposing of the vast agricultural surpluses which the federal government had accumulated. At the same time he served as chairman of the Citizens Committee for the Hoover Report, and was the American representative on the European Productivity Agency.

At the end of the Eisenhower administration Francis left government services and returned to private business. His last major activity was with the Economic Development Council of New York City. He remained a director emeritus of General Foods until his death.
