= Mario Procaccino =

American lawyer (1912–1995)

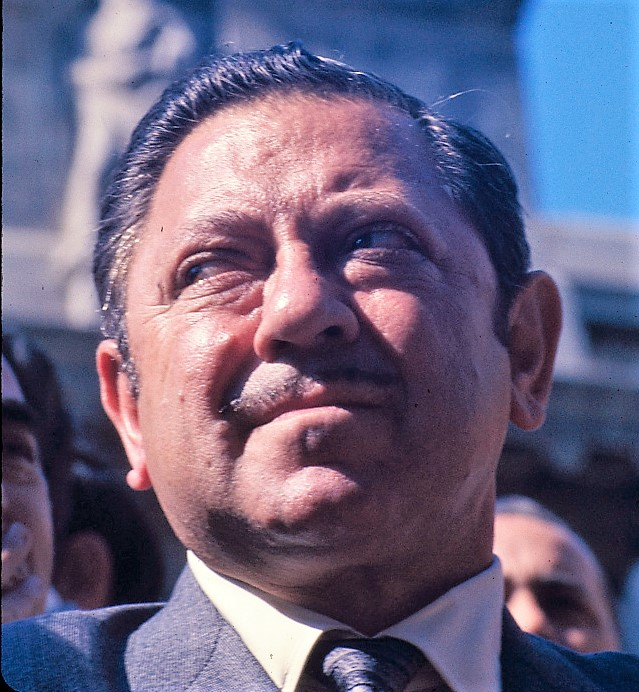
- Procaccino, 1970-1980

37th New York City Comptroller
- In office January 1, 1966 – December 31, 1969
- Mayor: John Lindsay
- Preceded by: Abraham Beame
- Succeeded by: Abraham Beame

Personal details
- Born: Mario Angelo Procaccino; September 5, 1912 Bisaccia, Avellino, Kingdom of Italy
- Died: December 20, 1995 (aged 83) Bronx, New York, U.S.
- Party: Democratic

Mario Angelo Procaccino (/proʊkəˈtʃinoʊ/ proh-kə-CHEE-no; September 5, 1912 – December 20, 1995) was an Italian-American lawyer, comptroller, and candidate for Mayor of New York City.

== Life and career ==
Procaccino was born in Bisaccia, Kingdom of Italy. When he was nine years old, his family immigrated to the United States. He graduated from DeWitt Clinton High School in the Bronx in 1931. Despite family poverty, he attended City College of New York and Fordham Law School, becoming a lawyer later in the 1930s. In the early 1940s, Mayor Fiorello La Guardia heard him address a war-bond rally in Italian, and seeing how excited the crowd was, told him he should be in politics and arranged for an appointment to a $3,500-a-year post with the city's legal department. When La Guardia's administration ended, Procaccino became a party worker for Tammany Hall and was eventually given a minor judgeship. In 1965, the New York Democrats supported Procaccino, a candidate from the Bronx of Italian ethnicity, for comptroller, along with a Jewish mayoral candidate, Abe Beame of Brooklyn, and an Irish-American from Queens, Frank O'Connor, for city council president. Procaccino and O'Connor were elected, but Beame was defeated by the Republican and Liberal Party of New York joint nominee, John V. Lindsay, a member of the United States House of Representatives and a then ally of fellow New York liberal Republicans Governor Nelson A. Rockefeller and United States Senator Jacob K. Javits.

== 1969 mayoral campaign ==
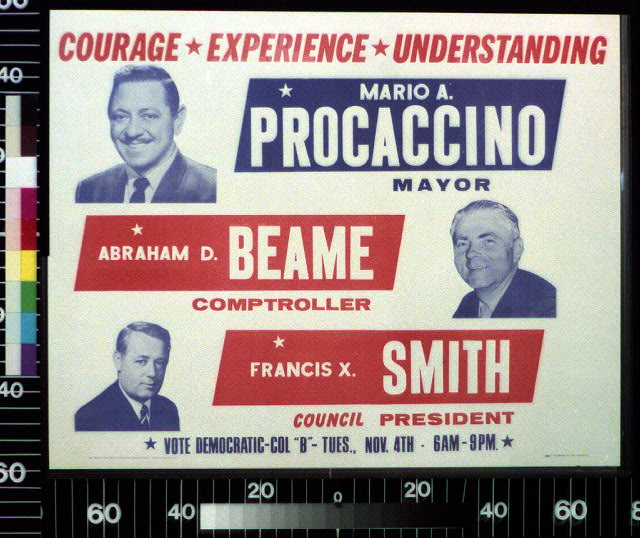
Procaccino campaign poster, Courage, experience, understanding - Mario A. Procaccino, Mayor, Abraham D. Beame, Comptroller, Francis X. Smith, Council President

In 1969 Procaccino won the Democratic primary for mayor with 32.8 percent of the vote in a five-man contest, having defeated, among others, former Mayor Robert Wagner, Jr., liberal novelist Norman Mailer, and Bronx Borough President Herman Badillo, who later defected to the GOP. After briefly having a large lead in the general election race (a poll in June showed him leading Liberal Party nominee Lindsay by fourteen points) the mostly conservative Democrat soon lost public support, probably because he was unable to supplement his law and order campaign rhetoric. His campaign was, according to journalist Richard Reeves, "the worst political campaign in American history." According to Reeves, Procaccino "snatched defeat from the jaws of victory," and made some notable blunders and verbal gaffes while on the campaign trail. When speaking before an African-American audience, Procaccino made a gaffe by saying, "My heart is as black as yours." He also said that his running mate, Frank O'Connor, "grows on you like a cancer."

Not helping matters any was the common permutation of his surname in the Hispanic community as Pro-Cochinos—in favor of pigs, a common nickname for police at the time. He also struggled with other ethnic communities, and often ran ads proclaiming himself as a voice of "Law and Order", comments which were often seen as dog-whistles by African American groups, leading them to often vote for Lindsay in much greater numbers than any Democratic ticket had struggled with before. He also split the conservative vote with his second opponent who defeated Lindsay in the Republican primary, John J. Marchi.

Procaccino lost the mayoralty to Lindsay in a three-way race. The vote was very divided, with Lindsay (Liberal) winning 42 percent, Procaccino (Democrat) 36 percent, and John Marchi (Republican), a member of the New York State Senate, 22 percent. Procaccino narrowly carried the Bronx and Brooklyn, with Lindsay taking Manhattan and Queens, and Marchi took his native Staten Island. Following the election, Procaccino worked as Tax Commissioner for Governor Rockefeller and later returned to private practice.

His campaign had several lasting effects on national and New York politics. One was his coining of the term "limousine liberal" to characterize John Lindsay, which has become a part of the American political lexicon. The second effect was a change of New York City's election law. As a result of Procaccino's slender plurality in the Democratic primary, the law was changed so that if no candidate carries at least 40 percent of the vote, a runoff election must be held.

Procaccino was living outside the city, in Harrison, Westchester County, New York, at the time of his death, but died in the Bronx, where he had lived most of his life.

== Sources ==
- Lizzi, Maria C. (18 September 2008). "'My Heart Is as Black as Yours': White Backlash, Racial Identity, and Italian American Stereotypes in New York City's 1969 Mayoral Campaign". Journal of American Ethnic History 27 (3).

Political offices
Preceded by Abraham Beame	New York City Comptroller; 1966–1969	Succeeded by Abraham Beame
Party political offices
Preceded by Abraham Beame	Democratic Nominee for Mayor of New York City; 1969	Succeeded by Abraham Beame
