= Mayoralty of Fiorello La Guardia =

Mayoralty in New York City (1934–1945)

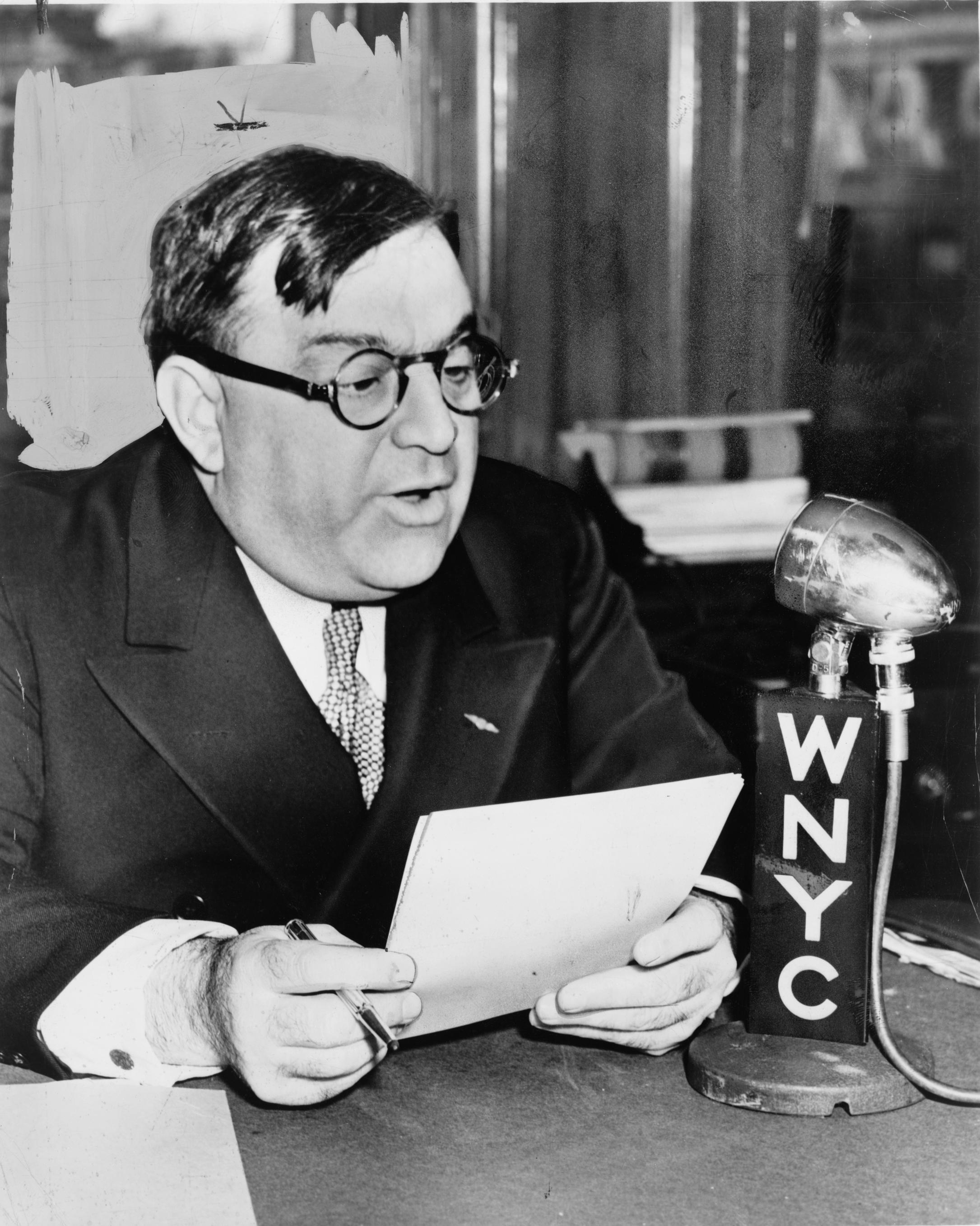
- Mayoralty of Fiorello La Guardia; January 1, 1934 – January 1, 1946
- Mayor: Fiorello La Guardia
- Party: Republican; American Labor Party; City Fusion Party
- Election: 1933; 1937; 1941
- Seal of New York City, New York

Fiorello La Guardia served as the 100th Mayor of New York City from January 1, 1934, to January 1, 1946. His mayoralty presided over New York City during the Great Depression and World War II. He is considered the builder of modern New York City due to his numerous infrastructure projects. He replaced John P. O'Brien and was succeeded by William O'Dwyer.

Before La Guardia's election as mayor in 1933, Tammany Hall had controlled the mayoralty for the past twelve years. He would win reelection two times and became the first Mayor of New York City to serve three terms. During his three terms as mayor he oversaw government reforms, fought against Tammany Hall, increased the budget by over $200 million, oversaw the development and completion of multiple infrastructure projects, and collaborated with President Franklin D. Roosevelt on multiple New Deal policies.

La Guardia is regarded as the best mayor in New York City's history and one of the best mayors in American history, according to The New York Times. The Guardian, in its obituary of La Guardia, stated that he was "the most remarkable mayor of a great city in American history". Another Republican would not win election as Mayor of New York City until John Lindsay won in the 1965 election and a Republican would not serve more than one term as mayor until Rudy Giuliani.

== Tenure ==
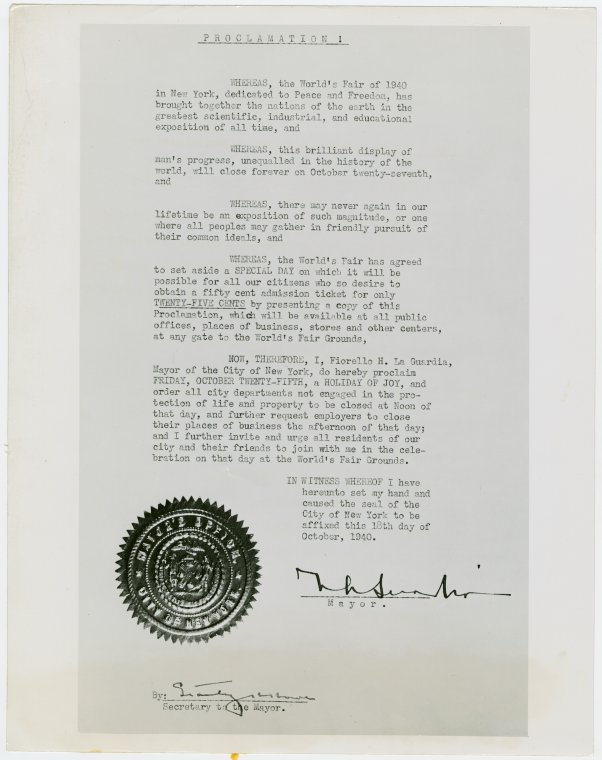
A letter written by Mayor Fiorello La Guardia regarding the 1939 New York World's Fair

=== City government ===
Fiorello La Guardia wrote legislation in 1934, which would have reformed New York City's government, but it failed as it lacked a two-thirds majority with 81 members of the New York State Assembly voting in favor and 61 voting against. An almost identical version of the legislation was put up again, but failed with 93 members voting in favor and 50 members voting against. Another version of the legislation, which was described by La Guardia as a "puny, anaemic and undersized baby", passed in the Assembly with 120 members voting in favor and 23 members voting against. The legislation passed in the New York State Senate and was signed into law by Governor Herbert H. Lehman on April 10, 1934.

Fred C. Lemmerman, a commissioner of the Triborough Bridge Authority and who had been appointed by the pro-Tammany Hall Mayor John P. O'Brien, was placed under investigation and accused of receiving $930 as a brokerage fee for consummating a lease for bridge authority offices. Lemmerman later resigned from his position and La Guardia appointed George Vincent McLaughlin to fill the vacancy. La Guardia later fired Commissioner John Stratton O'Leary and replaced him with Robert Moses causing the Triborough Bridge Authority to have only one pro-Tammany Hall member, Nathan Burkan, on the board. Burkan, who was an influential district leader in Tammany Hall, died on June 6, 1936.

La Guardia instituted civil service reforms during his tenure. The number of civil servants with unclassified positions fell from 15,000 to 1,500 from 1933 to 1940, and civil service applications rose from 6,327 in 1933, to over 250,000 by 1939. Irish-Americans, who dominated civil service leadership and patronage under Tammany, fell from being heads of 25-40% of departments to 5% under La Guardia.

La Guardia appointed William Bowne Parsons to succeed Raymond J. O'Sullivan, secretary of Tammany Hall, on the Board of Assessors.

La Guardia served as president of the United States Conference of Mayors from 1935 to 1945.

=== Civil rights and race ===
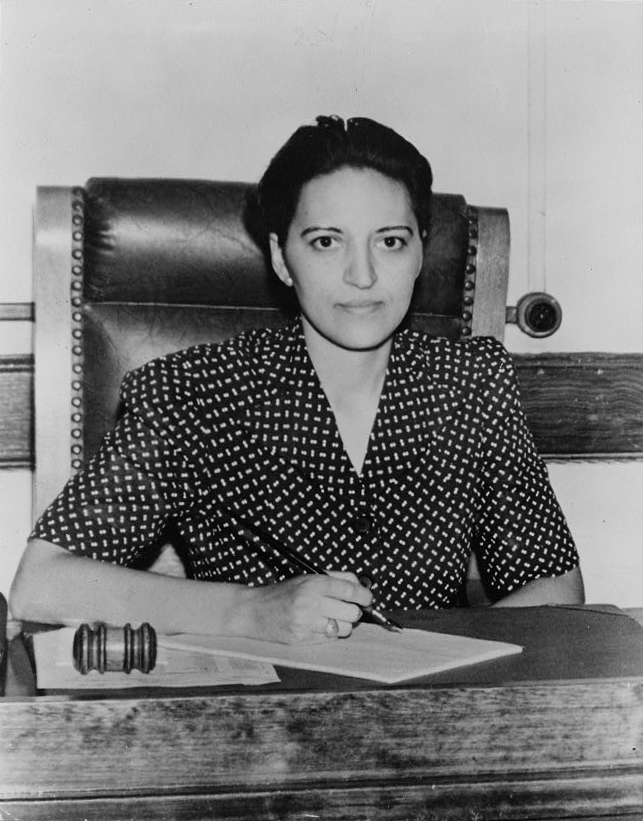
Jane Bolin, the first black woman to serve as a judge in the United States, was appointed by Mayor Fiorello La Guardia in 1939

La Guardia appointed Eugene Faulkner as a New York City Marshal, in 1935, making him the second black person and first black Republican to hold that position. He appointed Jane Bolin as a judge in 1939, making her the first black woman to serve as a judge in the United States.

La Guardia's efforts to improve racial relations were awarded by the Schomburg Center for Research in Black Culture and the Association for the Study of Negro Life and History in 1940. However, he was criticized by Adam Clayton Powell Jr. who accused La Guardia of ignoring the concerns of black people as he no longer needed their votes and stated that La Guardia was "one of the most pathetic figures on the current American scene".

The Quinn-Ives Act, which prohibited discrimination in hiring and established a committee to investigate complaints, was signed into law by Governor Thomas E. Dewey in March 1945, and La Guardia created the Mayor's Committee to Integrate Baseball with Branch Rickey serving on the committee.

=== Crime ===
La Guardia appointed John F. O'Ryan then Lewis Joseph Valentine to serve as New York City Police Commissioner. O'Ryan resigned after disputes between him and La Guardia about the police response to union strikes and accused La Guardia of encouraging "Communists and the vicious elements of the city". La Guardia appointed Austin MacCormick to serve as Commissioner of the New York City Department of Correction and during their tenure they oversaw the development and completion of Rikers Island Penitentiary to replace Welfare Island Penitentiary as New York City's jail.

La Guardia fought against Frank Costello's gambling empire and ordered raids that confiscated hundreds of slot machines. Costello converted 15,000 of his slot machines into candy machines and gained a court injunction against further raids. La Guardia continued the confiscations and had Paul Windels appeal the injunction. Anna Jurovaty was arrested for having one of the machines on her property and La Guardia found her guilty using his powers as a magistrate. Costello and Phillip Kastel later moved their gambling activities to Louisiana.

Following the Harlem riot of 1935, which resulted in over $2 million worth of property damage, La Guardia created an interracial commission to study the conditions that led to the riot occurring. The commission, which included Oswald Garrison Villard, Countee Cullen, Hubert Thomas Delany, A. Philip Randolph, and E. Franklin Frazier, reported after an eight-month investigation that the lack of social services, employment discrimination, police brutality, and overcrowded schools led to the riot. Following the Harlem riot of 1943, La Guardia instituted a curfew of 10:30 P.M., the last curfew instituted in New York City until the 2020 COVID-19 pandemic, and had it enforced by 6,000 police and 1,500 civilian volunteers.

La Guardia stated in 1935, that New York City was no longer the crime capital of the United States and that Chicago now held the highest crime rate in the United States. However, Wilbert Crowley, the First Assistant State's Attorney, criticized La Guardia's statement and said that "we consider ourselves in a splendid position" and asked for where La Guardia got his crime statistics from.

La Guardia commissioned a report by the New York Academy of Medicine in 1938, to study the effects of marijuana. The report was released in 1944, and showed that marijuana was not physically addictive, not a gateway drug, and did not lead to crime.

La Guardia appointed William Fellowes Morgan Jr. to serve as Commissioner of Public Markets to prevent racketeering in New York City's markets and Morgan appointed Michael Fiaschetti to clear racketeers out of the markets.

=== Development policy ===
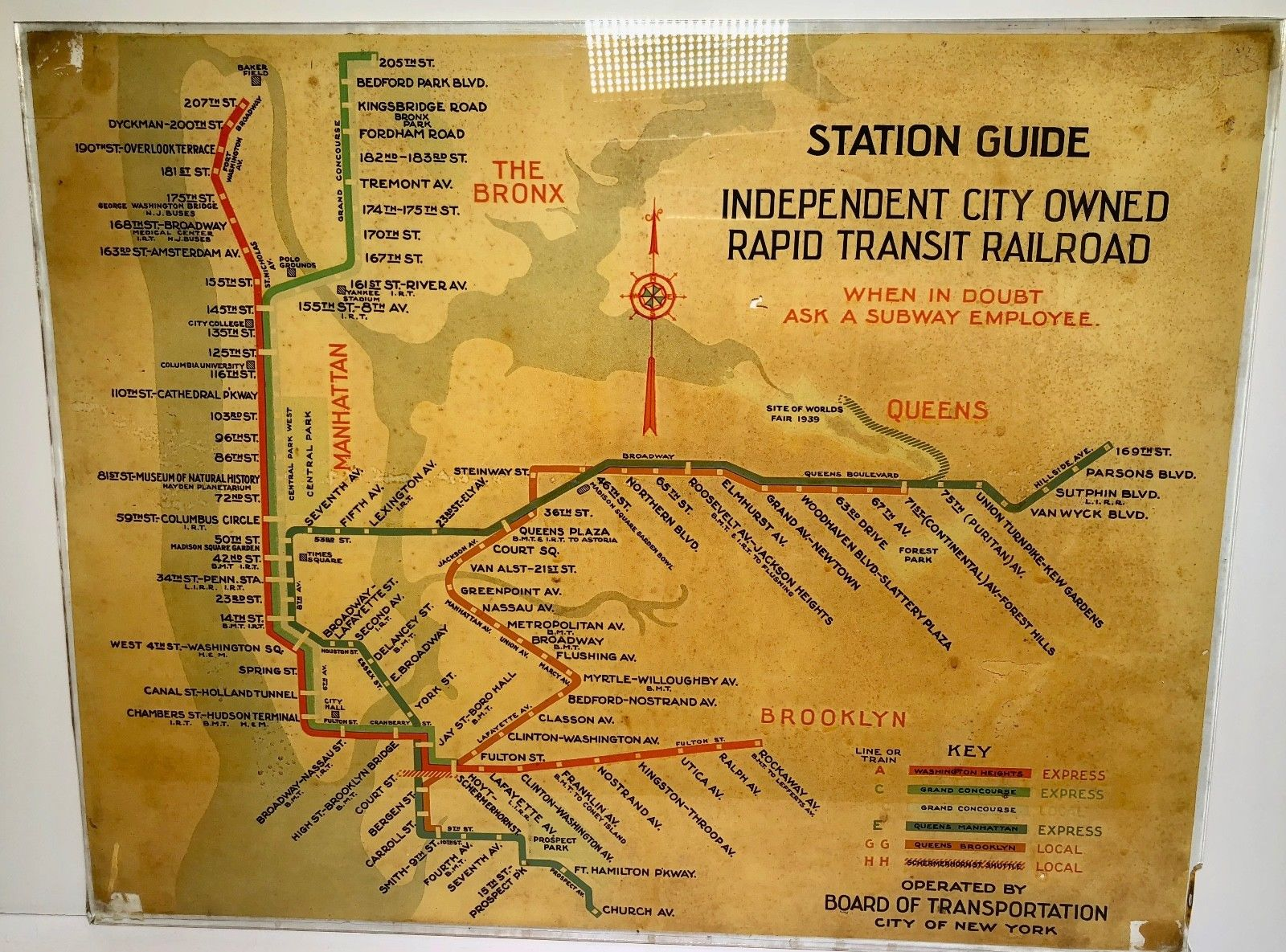
Map of the Independent Subway System (IND) from 1939

La Guardia revealed a plan in 1934, to develop a $101 million municipal power plant in New York City starting on February 1, 1935. However, the Consolidated Gas Company filed a lawsuit to prevent a proposed referendum on whether or not to build the municipal plant and the courts ruled in favor of the Consolidated Gas Company.

The Independent Subway System (IND) was opened in 1932, but New York City did not assume control of the system until 1940, under La Guardia and would remain under political control until the system was given to the New York City Transit Authority in 1953. He sought a $57,639,000 loan from the Public Works Administration to construct the Sixth Avenue Line in 1935, started construction on March 23, 1936, and the project was completed at a cost of $59,500,000 in 1940.

La Guardia formed the New York City Department of Parks and Recreation in 1934, by consolidating the five boroughs' independent parks departments and placing it under the control of Moses as its commissioner. During his tenure 1,800 engineers and designers, along with 70,000 workers in 1934, were employed, using money from New Deal programs, to expand and modernize public spaces.

Sixty playgrounds were constructed within La Guardia's first year as mayor and Moses completed Central Park Zoo in 1934. He opened the High School of Music & Art in 1936. The New York City Center was converted from a meeting place of the Shriners to a performing arts centers during La Guardia's tenure as mayor and he himself led the New York Philharmonic in The Star-Spangled Banner when the center was officially converted on December 11, 1943.

La Guardia called for the creation of a municipal airport in 1935. The New York City Board of Estimate voted twelve to one, with only George U. Harvey voting against, on November 2, 1939, to rename the Municipal Airport to La Guardia Field. Following the death of General Alexander E. Anderson the New York City Council voted to name an airport after him. La Guardia vetoed the legislation, but his veto was overridden by the council.

==== Federal projects ====
Historian Henry Graff stated that La Guardia mastered "the art of spending public money, before that skill became commonplace". La Guardia helped plan the Civil Works Administration and Travis Harvard Whitney was appointed by La Guardia's suggestion. 20% of the jobs created by the CWA nationally, 200,000, were in New York City. The CWA, Works Progress Administration, and Public Works Administration spent more than $1.1 billion in New York City from 1934 to 1939. Harry Hopkins gave New York City independent administrative control over WPA relief operations in 1936, and Hugh S. Johnson was appointed as its administrator at La Guardia's advice.

La Guardia presented an outline for a $1 billion public works program to President Franklin D. Roosevelt which would be completed using part of the $4 billion in Roosevelt's national work relief plan. The $1 billion proposal called for educational, sewage, highway, fire department, hospital, housing, and power plants funding. Included in the plan was allocations of $30 million towards the building of municipal power plants, $19 million for 500 steel subway cars, $57,639,000 for the Sixth Avenue subway line, $2,189,000 for the completion of the city subway system, $25,245,000 for sewage treatment works on Wards Island, $9 million for elevated highways, $12 million for the Queens Civic Centre in Jamaica, $18,500,000 for Central Criminal Courts, $9 million for Brooklyn College, $5 million for Brooklyn Public Library, $69 million for thirty-seven sewage treatment plants, $805,000 for nine new fire buildings, $82,241,000 for 142 elementary schools, and $38,508,000 for twenty-two high schools.

Moses' leadership of the Triborough Bridge Authority was opposed by Roosevelt as the two had been political enemies in state politics. He sought the removal of Moses or else federal funds would be withdrawn from the project. Moses ran for governor of New York in 1934, which prevented the president from removing federal funding in order to avoid being seen as politically motivated. After the election Harold L. Ickes issued PWA Administrative General Order No. 129 which was targeted at Moses. La Guardia initially promised to not reappoint Moses, but did not. The order threatened La Guardia's plans using $310 million in funding from the PWA and further plans using $100 million. Moses made the issue public, but Roosevelt and Ickes maintained their position despite media criticism. A compromise was reached in which the order would not apply retroactively. The announcement was focused around allowing Langdon Post, chair of the Municipal Housing Authority and Tenement House Commissioner of New York, to maintain his positions while only one sentence was dedicated to Moses. The Triborough Bridge Authority was later given $1.6 billion in federal funding.

Hereafter no funds shall be advanced to any authority, board or commission constituting an independent corporation or entity created for a specific project wholly within the confines of a municipality, any of the members of the governing body of which authority, board or commission holds any public office under said municipality.

— PWA Administrative General Order No. 129

=== Economic policy ===
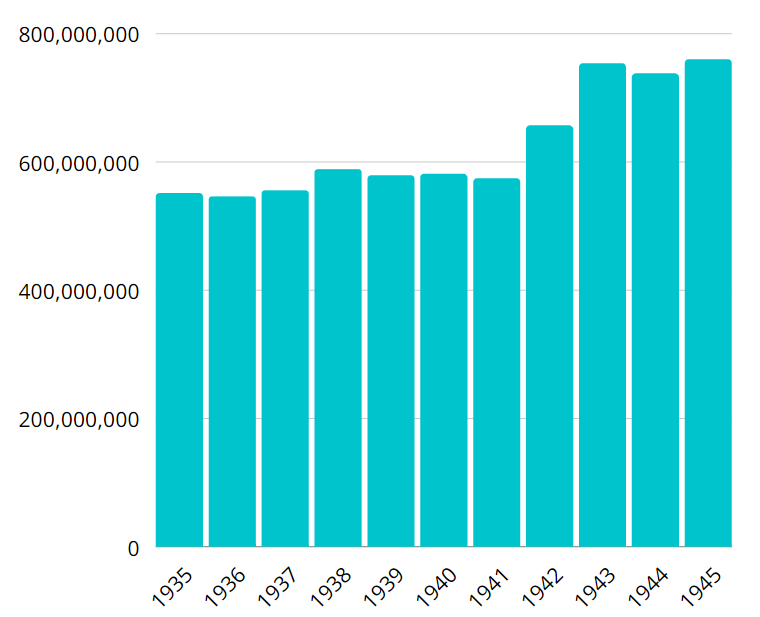
New York City's budget under Mayor Fiorello La Guardia

New York City had a budget of $550,961,960.06 in 1935, a budget of $545,541,842 in 1936, a budget of $554,998,917.10 in 1937, a budget of $587,980,567 in 1938, a budget of $578,509,839 in 1939, a budget of $581,048,834.10 from 1940 to 1941, a budget of $573,740,594.13 from 1941 to 1942, a budget of $656,314,369 from 1942 to 1943, a budget of $753,071,123.40 from 1943 to 1944, a budget of $737,400,923 from 1944 to 1945, and a budget of $759,266,401.82 in 1945.

La Guardia inherited a $31 million budget deficit from Mayor O'Brien upon taking office and he reduced the deficit by $19 million during 1934. He reduced spending through budget cuts and eliminating over 1,000 positions. A lawsuit was filed regarding the 1938 budget of $589,980,567, which La Guardia was against, and the court ruled five to one in favor of retaining the budget and invalidating the lower budget proposed by La Guardia.

La Guardia vetoed legislation which would have created an eight hour workday for members of the New York City Fire Department. He supported legislation which would have created an eight hour workday for nurses.

=== Foreign policy ===
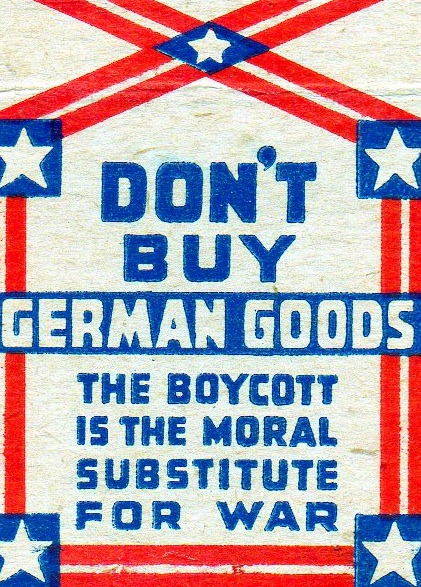
Mayor Fiorello La Guardia was a vice president of the Non-Sectarian Anti-Nazi League to Champion Human Rights and supported boycotting German products

Prior to taking office La Guardia had participated in a rally to protest Nazi Germany's discrimination against Jews. While giving the keynote address at the American National Conference Against Racial Persecution in Germany he stated that Adolf Hitler was "a perverted maniac". After taking office as Mayor of New York City he supported a boycott of German products which was being organized by Jews in New York.

Paul Marchandeau, the Mayor of Reims, France, and the head of the Association of the Mayors of France, visited New York City in 1934, and was greeted by La Guardia.

James Clement Dunn, chief of the Division of Western European affairs in the United States Department of State, delivered an apology to Hans Thomsen, counselor of the German embassy in the United States, on behalf of the Department of State in regards to a statement made by La Guardia about Adolf Hitler.

La Guardia served as one of the vice presidents of the Non-Sectarian Anti-Nazi League to Champion Human Rights. La Guardia and Allen Wardwell, the chairman of the Greater New York Campaign of Russian War Relief, announced Russian War Relief Week on June 20, 1942, in which they called for people to donate to buy medical supplies for the army of the Soviet Union fight the Nazis.

He supported changing the name of Manhattan's Sixth Avenue to Avenue of the Americas, stating that it would be an expression of the "love and affection… for our sister republics of Central and South America". La Guardia signed a bill to officially rename the avenue on October 2, 1945. The move was criticized as "propaganda" by those who wanted to return to the original name.

=== Housing policy ===
La Guardia created the New York City Housing Authority in 1934, and received up to $25 million in earmarked funding from the PWA. From 1934 to 1943, fourteen low rent public housing projects, which housed 17,040 families, were built.

In 1934, New York City had 17 square miles of slums, which 10 square miles of was "unfit for human habitation", which housed 516,000 families. La Guardia announced that he would remove 67,000 tenement buildings which housed 650,000 people and constituted the slums of New York City. In 1935, he asked for $150 million to $200 million in federal funding for low-rental housing projects in New York City and stated that it would cost $1,500,000,000 to properly house the 500,000 families currently living in sub-standard houses. He later asked the state legislature in 1939, to lend $120 million to municipalities for housing programs, with $100 million going to New York City for the rehousing of 1,500,000 people living in sub-standard conditions. In 1937, La Guardia was among two hundred mayors who wrote an open letter supporting the United States Conference of Mayors' slum clearance and rehousing plans and asked for the establishment of a permanent federal agency for slum clearance and low-rent housing programs.

When the Castle Village was completed in 1939, it was dedicated by La Guardia who stated that it was a "magnificent housing unit, which will afford the sunshine, scenery and comforts of a millionaire's living quarters to those without a millionaire's income". La Guardia signed a $6 million contract for the construction of the Riverton Houses by the Metropolitan Life Insurance Company in 1944.

== Elections ==
=== 1933 ===
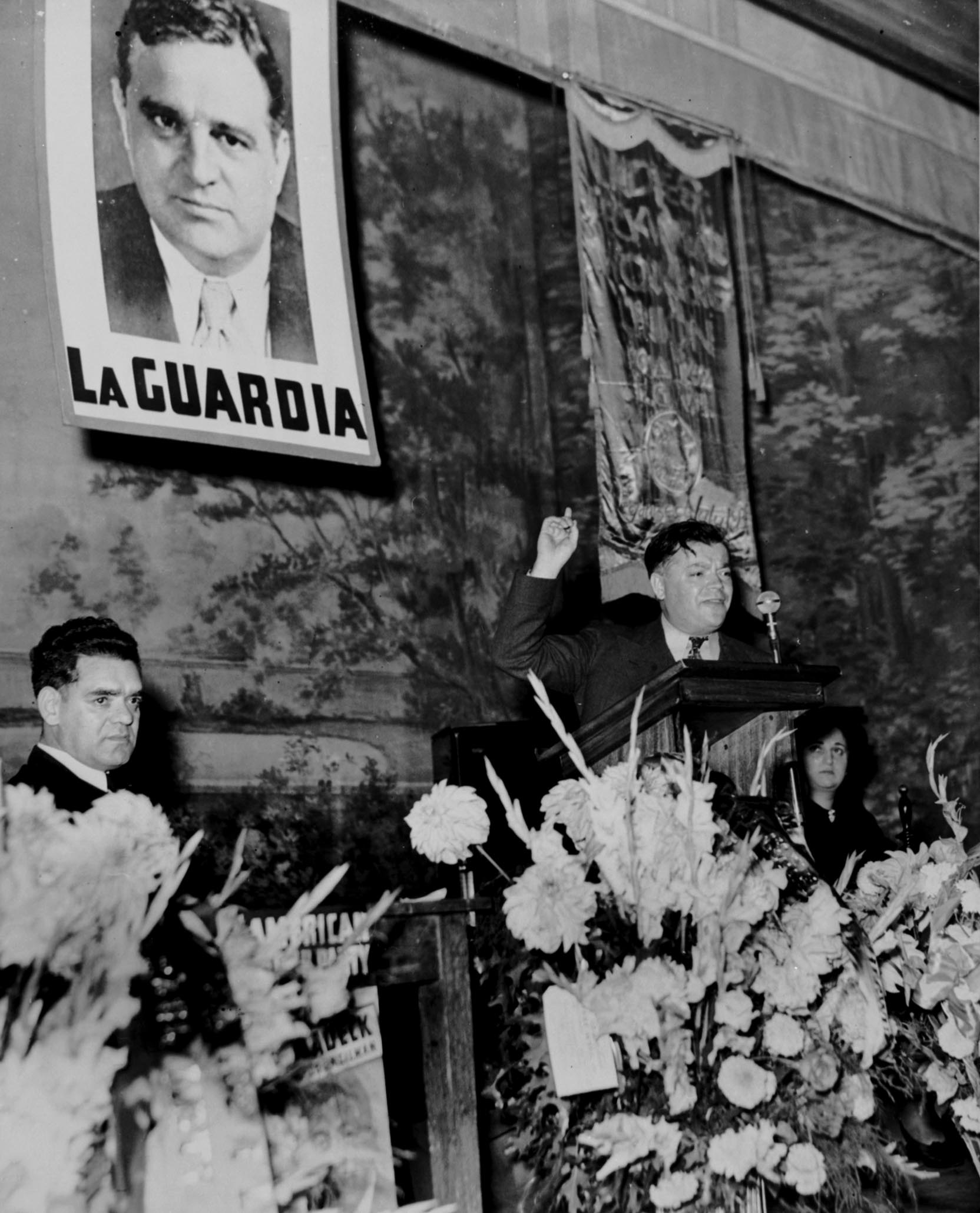
David Dubinsky speaking at a La Guardia gathering

La Guardia had run for the Republican nomination in the 1921 mayoral election despite Samuel S. Koenig, the boss of the Republican Party in Manhattan, telling him "Don't do it, Fiorello. The town isn't ready for an Italian mayor." He lost the Republican primary and did not place first in any of the boroughs. La Guardia later ran in the 1929 mayoral election, but the leaders of the Republican Party chose to abstain from the election or gave their support to Mayor Jimmy Walker who defeated La Guardia and placed first in all sixty-two assembly districts. La Guardia lost reelection to the United States House of Representatives in the 1932 election against James J. Lanzetta, who was backed by Tammany Hall. He announced that he would run for the Republican nomination in the 1933 mayoral election.

Mayor Walker resigned on September 1, 1932, following investigations into corruption by the Hofstadter Committee under the leadership of Samuel Seabury. La Guardia stated that "this is a great day for our country" after being told of Walker's resignation. O'Brien, another Tammany backed candidate, was elected to succeed Walker in the 1932 special election. The Fusion Conference Committee, a group of reformers and Republicans was formed to select a candidate to oppose Tammany Hall in the mayoral election. La Guardia sought their support, but they instead chose to give their support to O'Ryan after other candidates declined. La Guardia later defeated O'Ryan and his supporters during the nomination selection of the Republican Mayoralty Committee and gained the nominations of the Republican and City Fusion parties while O'Ryan withdrew from the election.

La Guardia won the nomination of the Republican and City Fusion parties. He defeated O'Brien, former Mayor Joseph V. McKee, and other minor political candidates in the election with a plurality of the popular vote. Tammany Hall had controlled the mayoralty for the past twelve years prior to La Guardia's victory. It was the first time a fusion candidate had been elected mayor since John Purroy Mitchel's victory in the 1913 election.

=== 1937 ===
La Guardia announced that he would seek reelection as Mayor of New York City in the 1937 election and he was opposed for the Republican nomination by Almbert Fairchild, Thomas J. Curran, and Charles G. Bond. All 475 delegates of the City Fusion Party voted unanimously to give their party's nomination to La Guardia, the American Labor Party voted unanimously to give its nomination to La Guardia, and he won the Republican primary. He had won the Republican nomination despite his support for President Roosevelt in the 1936 presidential election.

The Socialist Party initially selected to give its nomination to Norman Thomas, but he withdrew and the party endorsed La Guardia. He was endorsed by the Communist Party USA, but LaGuardia disavowed their support. He defeated Jeremiah T. Mahoney, the Democratic nominee, with over 60% of the popular vote. La Guardia was able to win the election due to his results from the American Labor ballot line.

=== 1941 ===
La Guardia stated in 1939, that he would not seek reelection in the 1941 mayoral election. However, he announced that he would seek reelection to a third term in 1941. He defeated Democratic nominee William O'Dwyer while running on the ballot lines of the Republican, American Labor, City Fusion, and United City parties. La Guardia's election victory made him the first mayor in New York City history to serve three terms.

== Works cited ==
- Kessner, Thomas (1989). Fiorello H. LaGuardia and the Making of Modern New York. McGraw Hill Education. ISBN 0-07-034244-X.
- Mann, Arthur (1965). La Guardia Comes To Power 1933. J. B. Lippincott & Co.
