= Betty Boyd Caroli =

American biographer and historian

- Born: Betty Boyd
- Education: Oberlin College; Annenberg School of Communications; New York University
- Occupations: Historian, biographer
- Spouse: Livio Caroli
- Writing career
- Subject: First ladies of the United States
- Website: www.bettyboydcaroli.com

Betty Boyd Caroli is an American historian and biographer specializing in the lives and roles of American first ladies, and also about certain aspects of immigration.

Caroli was raised in Mt. Vernon, Ohio, and earned a bachelor's degree at Oberlin College. She later earned a master's degree in mass communication at the University of Pennsylvania and a Ph.D. in American civilization from New York University.

She met her husband, oboist Livio Caroli, in Venice, Italy, while she was traveling through Europe. She taught women's studies and immigration at Kingsborough Community College of the City University of New York, before retiring to write full-time. Caroli and her husband live in New York City.

== Bibliography ==
Title	Year	ISBN	Publisher	Subject matter	Interviews, presentations, and reviews	Comments
Italian Repatriation from the United States, 1900-1914	1973	ISBN 9780595484478 (2008 ed.)	Center for Migration Studies			
The Italian Immigrant Woman in North America	1978	ISBN 9780969091608	Multicultural History Society of Ontario			co-edited with Robert Harney and Lydio Tomasi
Today's Immigrants: Their Stories	1981	ISBN 9781423738374	Oxford University Press	Immigration to the United States		co-authored with Thomas Kessner
First Ladies	1987	ISBN 9780195037685 (1987); ISBN 9780190669133 (2019)	Oxford University Press	First Ladies of the United States	Interview with Caroli on First Ladies, March 14, 2021, C-SPAN	Since 1987 there have been numerous updated editions published, with the most recent being published in 2019.
Immigrants Who Returned Home	1990	ISBN 9780877548645	Chelsea House			
Inside the White House	1992	ISBN 9781558594388	Doubleday	The White House		
America's First Ladies	1996	ISBN 9781568651682	Doubleday Direct	First Ladies of the United States		
The Roosevelt Women: A Portrait in Five Generations	1998	ISBN 9780465071333	Basic Books	Roosevelt family	Presentation by Caroli on The Roosevelt Women, September 24, 1998, C-SPAN; Booknotes interview with Caroli on The Roosevelt Women, May 9, 1999, C-SPAN	
Lady Bird and Lyndon: The Hidden Story of a Marriage That Made a President	2015	ISBN 9781439191224	Simon & Schuster	Lady Bird Johnson	Q&A interview with Caroli on Lady Bird and Lyndon, December 13, 2015, C-SPAN	
