= Fiorello La Guardia =

American politician (1882–1947)

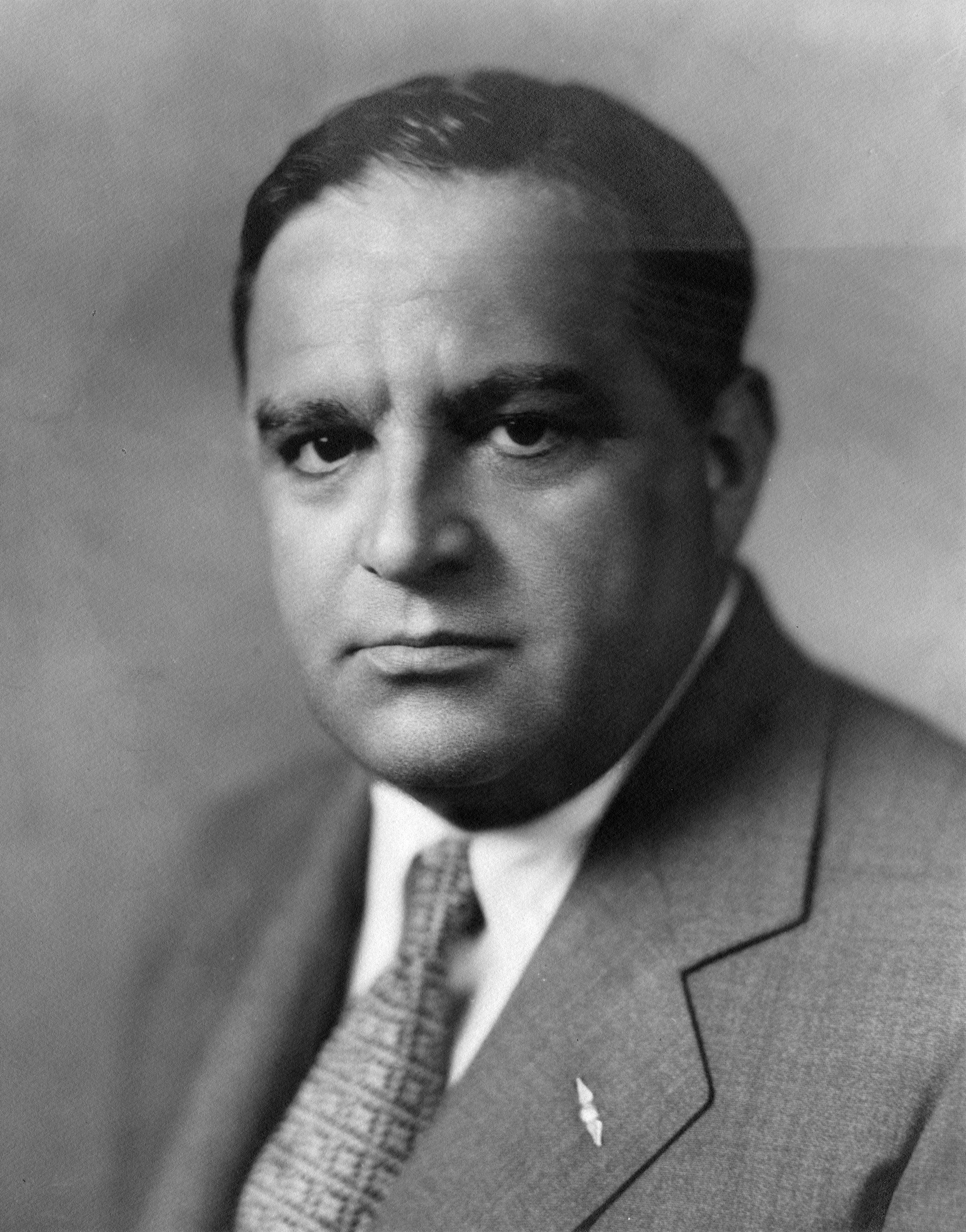
- Portrait by The New York Times, c. 1934–1945

2nd Director General of the United Nations Relief and Rehabilitation Administration
- In office April 1, 1946 – December 31, 1946
- Secretary General: Trygve Lie
- Preceded by: Herbert H. Lehman
- Succeeded by: Lowell Rooks

Director of the Office of Civilian Defense
- In office May 20, 1941 – February 11, 1942
- President: Franklin D. Roosevelt
- Preceded by: Position established
- Succeeded by: James M. Landis

100th Mayor of New York City
- In office January 1, 1934 – January 1, 1946
- Preceded by: John P. O'Brien
- Succeeded by: William O'Dwyer

5th President of the United States Conference of Mayors
- In office 1935–1945
- Preceded by: Daniel Hoan
- Succeeded by: Edward Kelly

Member of the U.S. House of Representatives from New York
- In office March 4, 1923 – March 3, 1933
- Preceded by: Isaac Siegel
- Succeeded by: James J. Lanzetta
- Constituency: 20th district
- In office March 4, 1917 – December 31, 1919
- Preceded by: Michael F. Farley
- Succeeded by: Nathan D. Perlman
- Constituency: 14th district

9th President of the New York City Board of Aldermen
- In office January 1, 1920 – December 31, 1921
- Preceded by: Robert L. Moran
- Succeeded by: Murray Hulbert

Personal details
- Born: Fiorello Enrico Raffaelo La Guardia; December 11, 1882 New York City, New York, U.S.
- Died: September 20, 1947 (aged 64) New York City, New York, U.S.
- Resting place: Woodlawn Cemetery
- Party: Republican
- Other political affiliations: Bull Moose (1916); American (1916); Democratic (1918); LaFollette Progressive (1924); Socialist (1924); Progressive Labor (1926); City Fusion (1933–1941); American Labor (1937–1941); Independent Progressive (1937); United City (1941)
- Spouses: Thea Almerigotti (m. 1919; died 1921); Marie Fisher (m. 1929)
- Children: 3
- Education: New York University (LLB)

Military service
- Allegiance: United States
- Branch/service: United States Army
- Years of service: 1917–1919
- Rank: Major
- Unit: United States Army Air Service
- Battles/wars: World War I; Italian Front

Fiorello Henry La Guardia (Note: English pronunciation: /ˌfiːəˈrɛloʊ ləˈɡwɑːrdiə/ FEE-ə-REL-oh lə-GWAR-dee-ə.) (born Fiorello Raffaele Enrico La Guardia; (Note: Italian pronunciation: [fjoˈrɛllo raffaˈɛːle enˈriːko la ˈɡwardja].) (Note: La Guardia signed his surname as a single word with no space between the La and the capitalized G which follows, but also with no space between his initial F and the surname; in his lifetime his surname was almost always written as two words.) December 11, 1882 – September 20, 1947) was an American attorney and politician who served as the 100th mayor of New York City from 1934 to 1946. He previously represented New York in the U.S. House of Representatives from 1917 to 1919 and again from 1923 to 1933. He was known for his irascible, energetic, and charismatic personality and diminutive, rotund stature. (Note: Only five feet, two inches (1.57 m) tall, La Guardia was called "the Little Flower", literally translating his Italian given name Fiorello.) A progressive member of the Republican Party, La Guardia was frequently cross-endorsed by parties other than his own, especially parties on the left under New York's electoral fusion laws. A panel of 69 scholars in 1993 ranked him as the best big city mayor in American history.

Born to a family of Italian immigrants in New York City, La Guardia quickly became interested in politics at a young age. Before his mayoralty, La Guardia represented Manhattan in the U.S. House of Representatives and later served in the New York City Board of Aldermen. Amidst the Great Depression, La Guardia campaigned on his support for Franklin D. Roosevelt and his New Deal programs and won the 1933 election. As mayor during the Great Depression and World War II, La Guardia unified the city's transit system; expanded construction of public housing, playgrounds, parks, and airports; reorganized the New York Police Department; and implemented federal New Deal programs within the city. He pursued a long series of political reforms, curbing the power of the powerful Irish-controlled Tammany Hall political machine that controlled the Democratic Party in Manhattan, replacing its influence with merit-based employment and promotion in bureaucracy.

La Guardia was a highly visible national political figure. His support for the New Deal and relationship with President Roosevelt crossed party lines, brought federal funds to New York City, and cut off patronage to La Guardia's Tammany enemies. La Guardia's WNYC radio program "Talk to the People", which aired from December 1941 until December 1945, expanded his public influence beyond the borders of the city.

== Early life and education ==
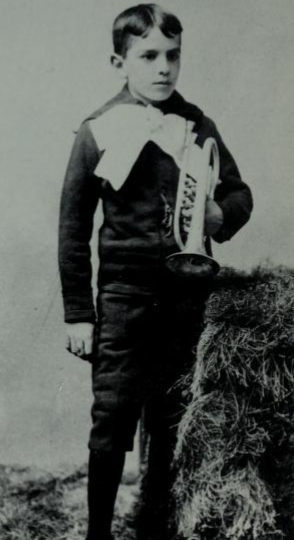
La Guardia at age 13

Fiorello Raffaele Enrico La Guardia, with Raffaele later removed and Enrico Americanized to Henry, was born in Greenwich Village, New York City, on December 11, 1882, to Achille Luigi Carlo La Guardia and Irene Luzzatto-Coen. He was named Fiorello in honor of his maternal grandmother Fiorina, Raffaele after his paternal grandfather, and Enrico after his uncle.

Achille was born in Foggia, Kingdom of the Two Sicilies, on March 26, 1849, and his father Don Raffaele was a municipal official. Later biographies claimed that Raffaele fought as one of Giuseppe Garibaldi's Redshirts. Achille visited the United States in 1878, while on tour with Adelina Patti. Irene, a member of the Sephardic Jewish Luzzatto family, was born in Trieste (then under the Austrian Empire), on July 18, 1859. Her mother Fiorina was a distant relative of Prime Minister Luigi Luzzatti. Achille, a former Catholic, was an atheist and Irene was a non-practicing Jew. Achille, age 31, met Irene, age 21, at a dance in Trieste. They knew each other for half a year before they were married by Trieste Mayor Rici Bazzoni on June 3, 1880. The couple moved to the United States in 1880. Achille forbade his children from speaking Italian and Fiorello would not become proficient in Italian until his time as a consular agent.

Achille enlisted in the United States Army in 1885, and served in the 11th Infantry Regiment as a warrant officer and chief musician. His family lived in the Dakota Territory, New York, and the Arizona Territory during his time at Fort Sully, Madison Barracks, Fort Huachuca, and Whipple Barracks. Fiorello was enrolled in the Episcopal Church in Prescott, Arizona, and practiced that religion all his life.

The onset of the Spanish–American War led to their transfer to St. Louis, Missouri, in April 1898, and then Achille was sent to Mobile, Alabama. Fiorello attempted to join the army, but was rejected. He was accepted as a war correspondent for the St. Louis Post-Dispatch. Achille and Fiorello did not reach Cuba because Achille contracted hepatitis and malaria, allegedly after consuming embalmed beef. He was discharged from the military on account of his illness on August 22, and given a pension of $8 per month (equivalent to $310 in 2025).

The La Guardia family moved to Trieste in 1898, and lived with Fiorina until her death in 1901. Achille worked as a trucker, a ship provisioner, and managed a hotel and turned down a job from the American Consul of Budapest due to the low pay. He died in Capodistria on October 21, 1904, due to heart disease.

== Career ==
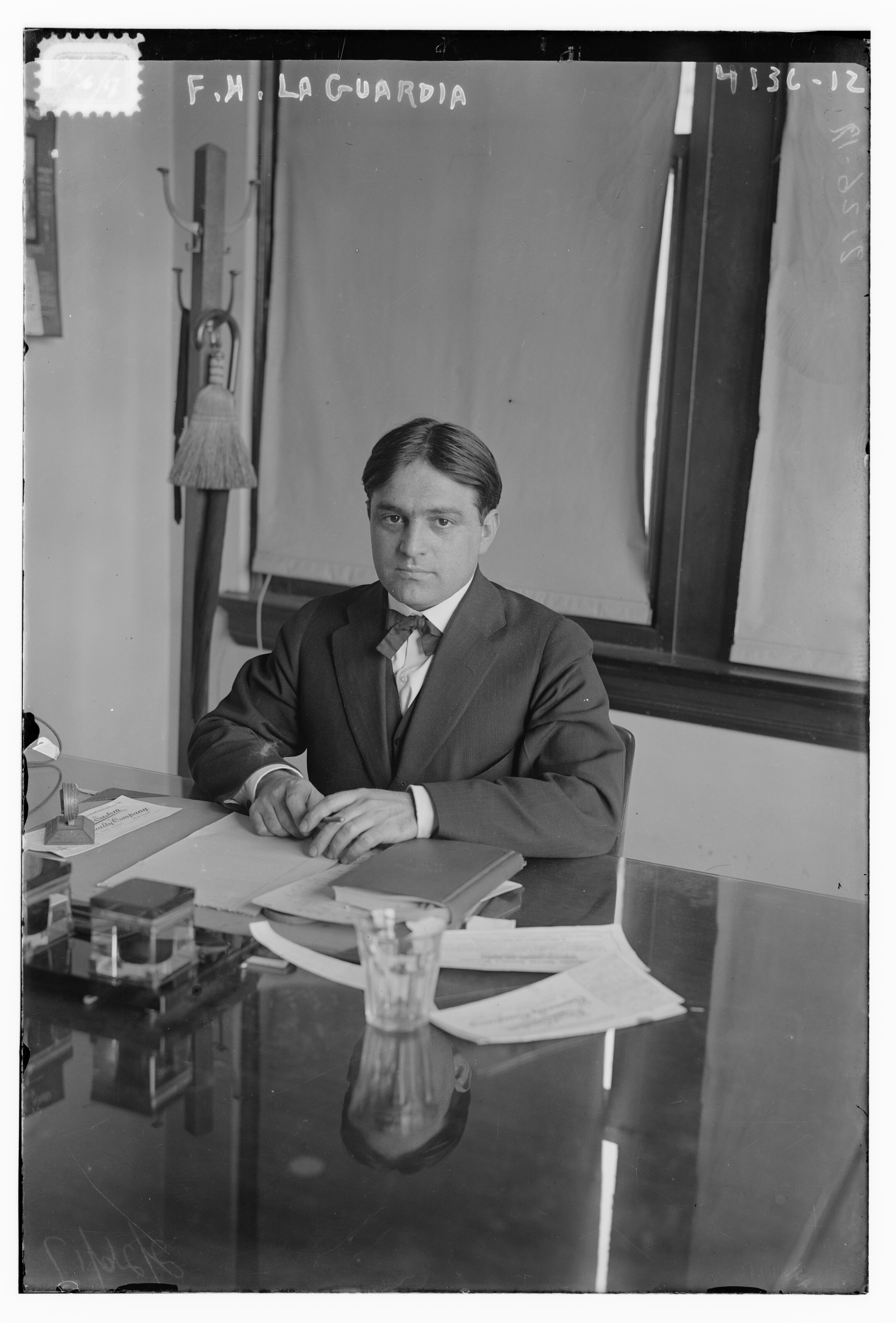
La Guardia at his Interpreter's desk on Ellis Island c. 1910

Raymond Willey, a friend of Achille and consular agent of the autonomous city of Fiume, had La Guardia hired as a clerk in the Budapest consulate with a yearly salary of $100. In 1903, he was placed in charge of the agency in Fiume due to his knowledge of Italian and was commissioned as a consular agent on February 8, 1904. He resigned on May 31, 1906, and left Europe after failing to gain a promotion to consul-general in Fiume or an appointment as consul-general in Belgrade. He worked as an interpreter for the immigration services at Ellis Island from November 6, 1907, to 1910. He was a Croatian, Italian, and German interpreter and Felix Frankfurter, who met La Guardia during his time at Ellis Island, described him as "a gifted interpreter".

Upon returning to the United States, La Guardia worked as a fireproof brick manufacturer in Portsmouth, Ohio. He returned to New York City and worked a series of odd jobs such as a translator for the New York Society for the Prevention of Cruelty to Children, a steamship company clerk, stenographer at Pratt Institute, and a clerk for Abercrombie & Fitch. In 1912, around 60,000 garment workers went on strike and La Guardia, who was friends with August Bellanca, gave speeches in Italian and Yiddish in support of the strike.

La Guardia graduated from the New York University School of Law and was admitted to the bar in 1910. He became a member of the Garibaldi Lodge No. 542 of the Grand Lodge of New York of Freemasonry Order in 1913. Frederick C. Tanner recommended La Guardia for a job working for the Attorney General of New York on September 15, 1911, and he served as the deputy attorney general from January 1, 1915, to 1917. He left the American Bar Association in the 1930s stating that it devoted "its efforts to special interests rather than to the uplift and welfare of the profession".

In 1925, La Guardia formed the La Guardia Publishing Company using his savings and a second mortgage to publish L'Americolo, an Italian-language magazine. He competed against Generoso Pope's Il Progresso Italo-Americano and Corriere d'America. The magazine failed, with La Guardia losing $15,000 and his mortgage.

== Early political career ==
=== Local politics ===
La Guardia joined the Republican club while attending NYU School of Law. He supported William Howard Taft during the 1912 presidential election and replaced William Chadbourne as district captain due to Chadbourne's support for Theodore Roosevelt's third-party campaign. La Guardia refused to support John Purroy Mitchel's Fusion campaign during the 1913 mayoral election despite Mitchel's support among Republicans.

Republican political boss Samuel S. Koenig convinced La Guardia to run in the 1919 special election for President of the New York City Board of Aldermen created by Al Smith's resignation to become governor. La Guardia defeated William M. Bennett for the Republican nomination and Paul Windels worked as his campaign manager. During the campaign he was endorsed by The New York Times and Citizens Union. He defeated Democratic nominee Robert L. Moran. Moran suffered from a spoiler effect caused by Michael Kelly, a former Democrat, running as the Liberty Party candidate.

La Guardia supported Republican presidential and gubernatorial candidates Warren G. Harding and Nathan L. Miller during the 1920 election. However, he later attacked Miller for his public transit policies and getting rid of welfare programs. His opposition to Miller ruined his chances in the 1921 mayoral election and the Republican nomination was given to Henry Curran. He attempted to defeat Curran in the primary, despite warnings from Koenig and Windels and was defeated.

La Guardia considered running in the 1922 gubernatorial election and published his ideas for the Republican state platform in the column in the New York Evening Journal given to him by William Randolph Hearst. Koenig was able to compromise with La Guardia to avoid a primary with Miller. La Guardia favored Smith, the Democratic nominee, during the 1928 presidential election.

=== U.S. House of Representatives ===
==== Elections ====
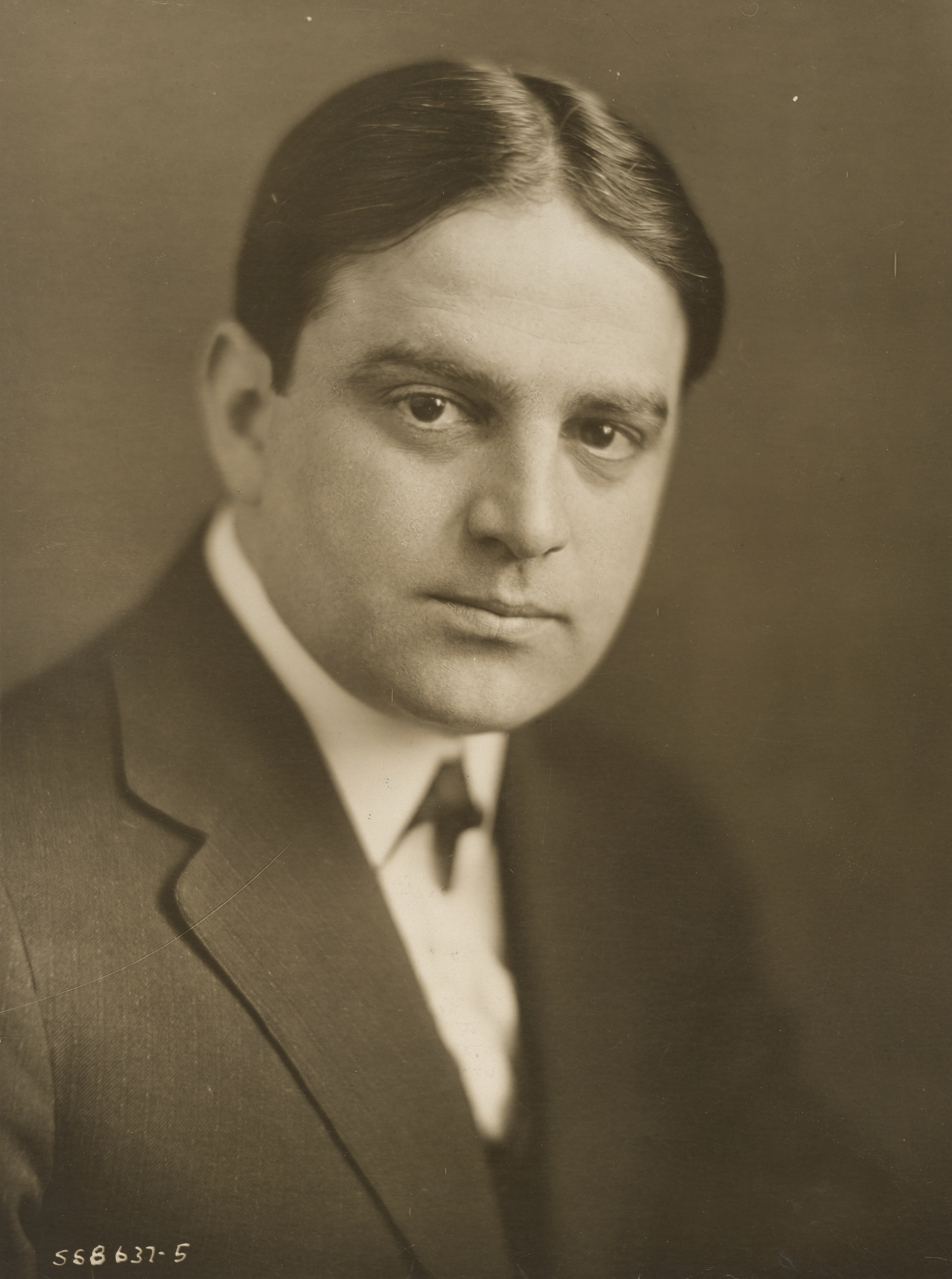
Portrait by Underwood & Underwood, 1918

La Guardia ran for a seat in the U.S. House of Representatives from New York's 14th congressional district during the 1914 election. He chose to run as he noticed during a 25th Assembly district Republican club meeting that nobody was nominated for it as Frederick Marshall unexpectedly withdrew. The district was a strongly Democratic and Tammany Hall. He lost to Democratic nominee Michael F. Farley, whom he accused of being illiterate. Louis Espresso and Harry Andrews managed his campaign.

Clarence Fay, the Republican district leader in the 25th Assembly district, sought to have Hamilton Fish III nominated for the seat in the 1916 election. Tanner unsuccessfully attempted to convince La Guardia not to run. Fish withdrew before the primary and La Guardia won the Republican nomination. He appealed to the different ethnic groups in the district and was endorsed by New Yorker Staats-Zeitung which traditionally supported Democratic candidates. He defeated Farley by 357 votes.

Tammany Hall and the Democrats supported La Guardia in the 1918 election in order to prevent an anti-war Socialist victory. He defeated Socialist nominee Scott Nearing in the election. La Guardia resigned from the United States House of Representatives on December 31, 1919. He was given the Republican nomination for New York's 20th congressional district to succeed retiring Representative Isaac Siegel in the 1922 election. He defeated Democratic nominee Henry Frank and Socialist nominee William Karlin.

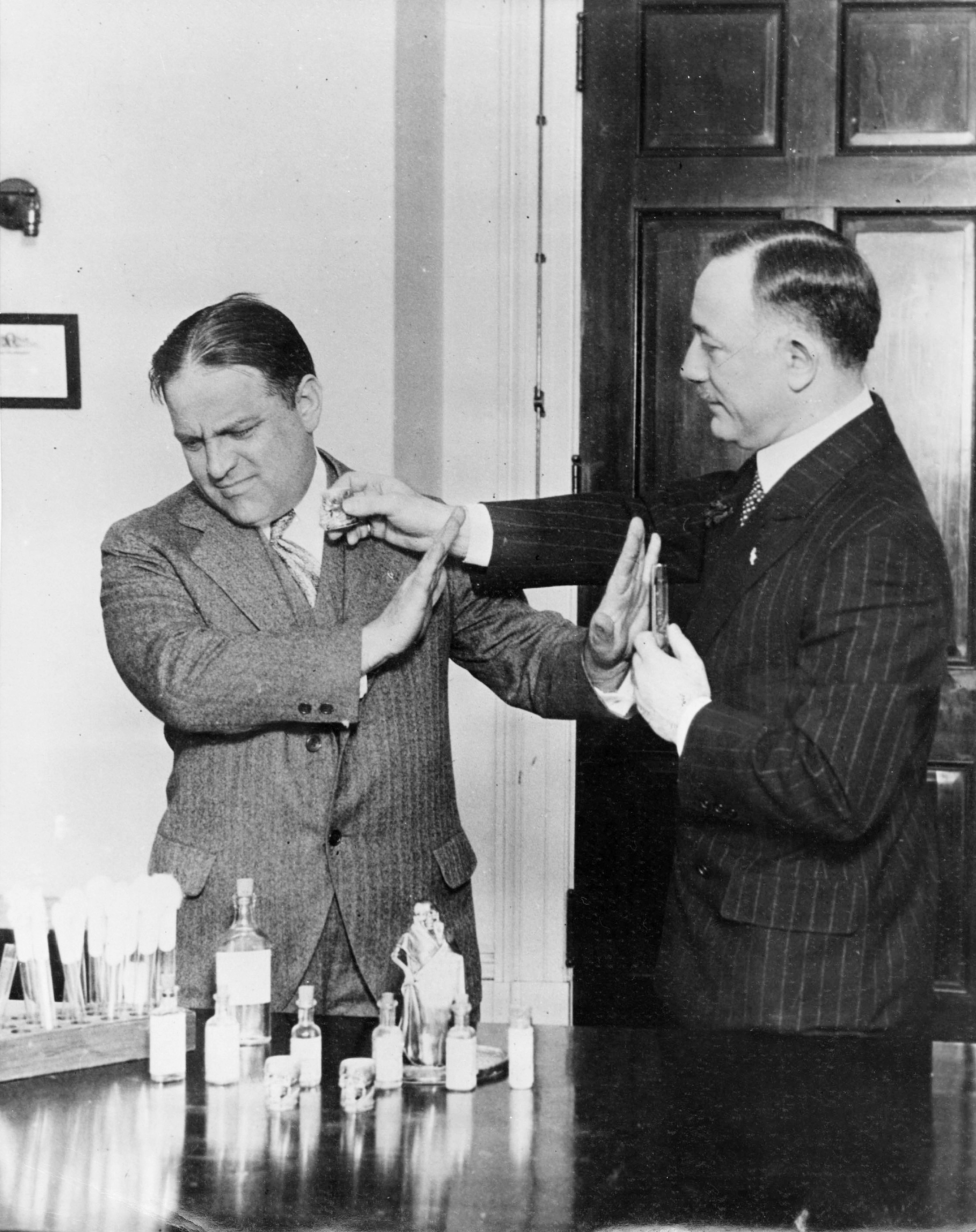
Congressmen Fiorello La Guardia and William Sirovich sample a foul-smelling industrial alcohol additive to replace poisonous deterrents, 1930

La Guardia attended the Conference for Progressive Political Action in 1922. Koenig told La Guardia that his renomination was dependent on him supporting the Republicans in the 1924 presidential election. La Guardia considered supporting the Democrats but declined to do so after the nomination of John W. Davis. He gave his support to Robert M. La Follette and the Progressive Party. La Guardia announced his departure from the Republican Party on the front page of The New York Times. He and Gilbert Roe managed La Follette's presidential campaign in the eastern United States. La Guardia, running with the Socialist nomination, raised $3,764.25 (equivalent to $70,717 in 2025) and defeated Frank and Siegel in the election. La Guardia's campaign manager, Vito Marcantonio, was elected to Congress in his own right a decade later. La Guardia's partisan affiliation in Congress was labeled as Socialist and Victor L. Berger, the only other Socialist in Congress, described him as "my whip".

La Guardia returned to the Republican Party in the 1926 election and won by 55 votes against Democratic nominee H. Warren Hubbard and Socialist nominee George Dobsevage. He was the only Republican elected to the U.S. House from New York City. He defeated Democratic nominee Saul J. Dickheiser in the 1928 election. He defeated Democratic nominee Vincent H. Auleta in the 1930 election.

La Guardia considered running for reelection to Congress as a Democrat in the 1932 election and the option received support from William Green, John L. Lewis, and Robert F. Wagner. Political boss John H. McCooey supported him running as a Democrat, but Tammany Hall leader James Joseph Hines opposed him and had the nomination given to James J. Lanzetta. Lanzetta defeated La Guardia in the election due to the coattail effect of Franklin D. Roosevelt's victory in the presidential election. Robert M. La Follette Jr. stated that "the people have temporarily lost one of their most faithful servants".

==== Tenure ====
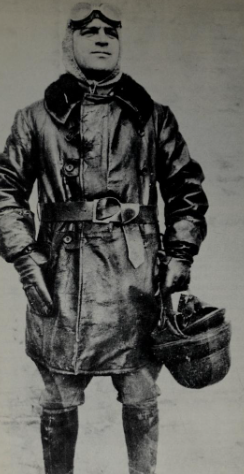
La Guardia wearing his aviator uniform, 1917

La Guardia was interested in airplanes and served as a director and attorney for Giuseppe Mario Bellanca's company. He enlisted to fight in World War I and was promoted to captain by October 1917. He and Major General William Ord Ryan trained Italian pilots in Foggia. La Guardia became certified to fly on December 12, 1917. King Victor Emmanuel III of Italy gave him the Flying Cross.

La Guardia rose to the rank of major in command of a unit of Caproni Ca.44 bombers on the Italian-Austrian front. While he was away at war his office was managed by Andrews and Marie Fisher while constituent services were handled by Representative Isaac Siegel. A petition with over 3,000 signatures was given to Speaker Champ Clark on January 8, 1918, asking for La Guardia's seat to be vacated, but Clark refused to allow a motion to vacate La Guardia's seat.

During La Guardia's tenure in the U.S. House, he served on the Judiciary committee. Oswald Garrison Villard, editor of The Nation, stated that he was "the most valuable member of Congress today". La Guardia supported impeaching Secretary of the Treasury Andrew Mellon on the grounds of him serving as a director of a private company, the Aluminum Company of America, while serving in the presidential cabinet.

La Guardia requested the pardon of Thomas Mooney. In 1931, James Smith, a black railroad porter, was put on trial for assault but was unable to pay for a lawyer. La Guardia took the case pro bono after being requested by A. Philip Randolph and Smith was acquitted on September 26.

=== 1929 mayoral election ===
La Guardia's supporters wanted him to run for mayor in the 1925 election, but he declined as he would be unlikely to defeat Jimmy Walker. He received the Republican nomination on August 1, 1929. In 1929, La Guardia ran for Mayor once again. This time, he received the Republican nomination, once again defeating William Bennett. However, he lost the general election to Walker in a landslide.

== Mayor of New York ==
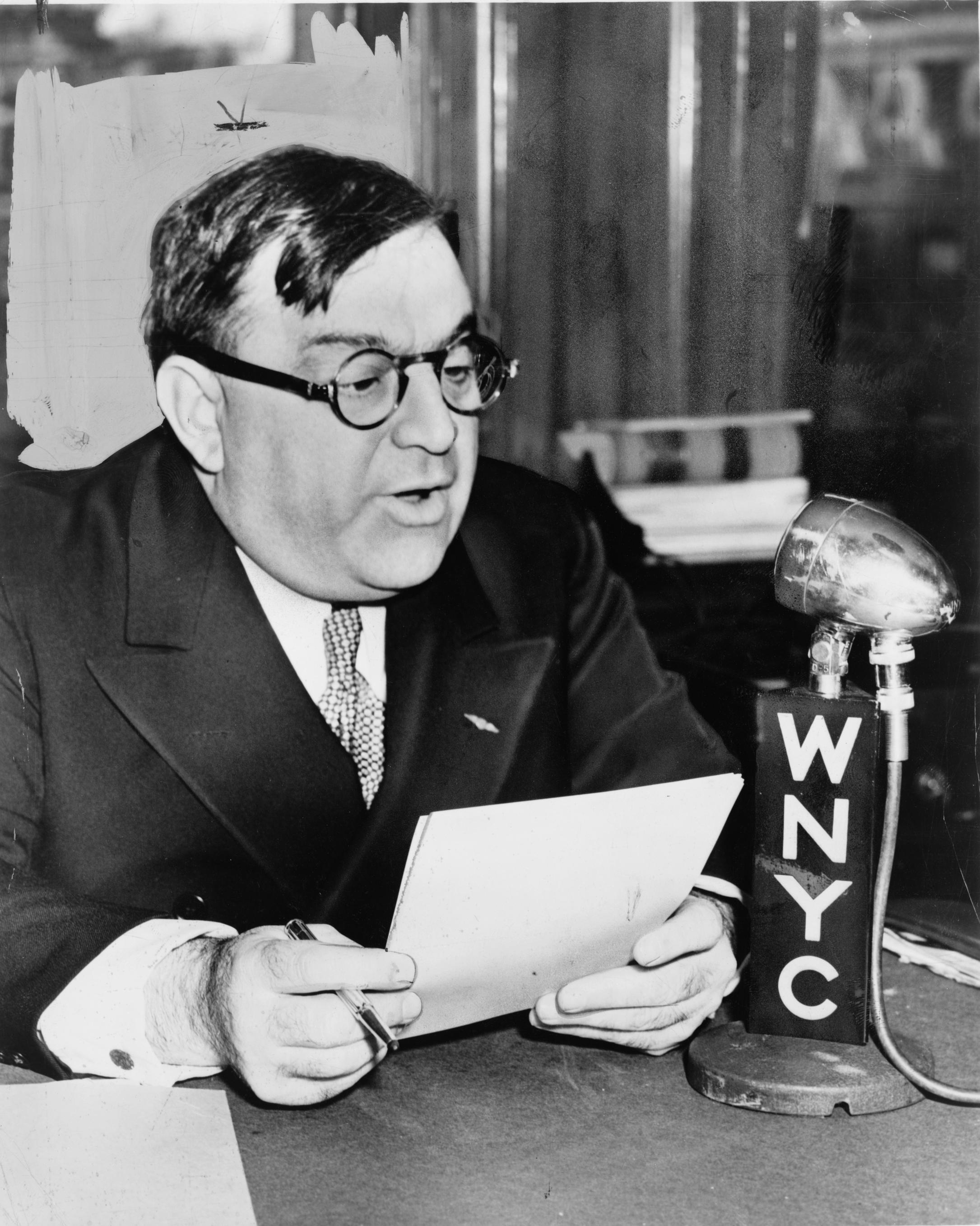
Mayor La Guardia speaks over WNYC on Grade A milk from Budget Room, March 23, 1940

=== 1933 mayoral election ===
Mayor Jimmy Walker and his Irish-run Tammany Hall were forced out of office by scandal and La Guardia was determined to replace him. La Guardia ran on the Fusion Party platform, which was supported by Republicans, reform-minded Democrats, and independents. La Guardia had enormous determination, high visibility, the support of reformer Samuel Seabury and a divisive primary contest. He also represented previously underrepresented communities, appealing to a wide range of cultural backgrounds with his lineage. He secured the nomination and expected an easy win against incumbent Mayor John P. O'Brien; however, Joseph V. McKee entered the race as the nominee of the new "Recovery Party" at the last minute. McKee was a formidable opponent, sponsored by Bronx Democratic boss Edward J. Flynn. La Guardia promised a more honest government, championing greater efficiency and inclusiveness.

La Guardia's win was based on a complex coalition of Republicans (mostly middle-class German Americans in the boroughs outside Manhattan), a minority of reform-minded Democrats, Socialists, a large proportion of middle-class Jews, and the great majority of Italians, whose votes had previously been overwhelmingly loyal to Tammany. During his mayoralty, La Guardia served as president of the United States Conference of Mayors from 1935 until 1945.

=== Agenda ===
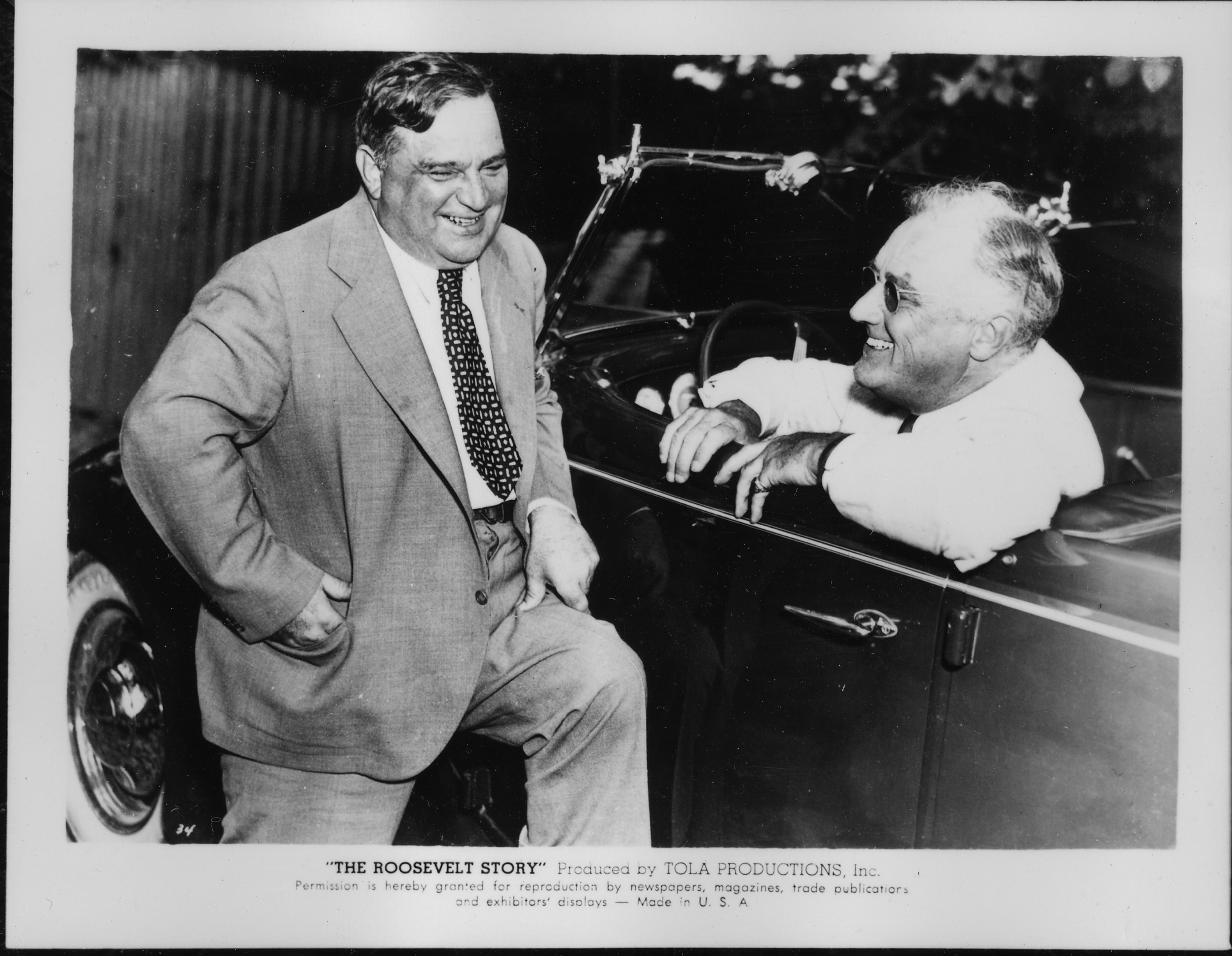
La Guardia and Franklin D. Roosevelt, 1938

La Guardia came to office in January 1934 with five main goals:

- Restore the financial health of the city and break free from the bankers' control
- Expand the federally funded work-relief program for the unemployed
- End corruption in government and racketeering in key sectors of the economy
- Replace patronage with a merit-based civil service, with high prestige
- Modernize the infrastructure, especially transportation and parks

La Guardia achieved most of the first four goals in his first hundred days, as FDR gave him 20% of the entire national CWA budget for work relief. La Guardia then collaborated closely with Robert Moses, with support from the governor, Democrat Herbert Lehman, to upgrade the decaying infrastructure. The city was favored by the New Deal in terms of funding for public works projects. La Guardia's modernization efforts were publicized in the 1936 book New York Advancing: A Scientific Approach to Municipal Government, edited by Rebecca B. Rankin.

=== African-American politics ===
In 1935, a riot took place in Harlem. Termed the Harlem riot of 1935, it has been described as the first modern race riot because it was committed primarily against property rather than persons. During the riots, La Guardia and Hubert Delany walked through the streets in an effort to calm the situation. After the riots, La Guardia convened the Mayor's Commission on Conditions of Harlem to determine the causes of the riot and a detailed report was prepared. The report identified "injustices of discrimination in employment, the aggressions of the police, and the racial segregation" as conditions which led to the outbreak of rioting; however, the mayor shelved the committee's report, and did not make it public. The report would be unknown, except that a black New York newspaper, the Amsterdam News, subsequently published it in serial form.

=== Ethnic politics ===
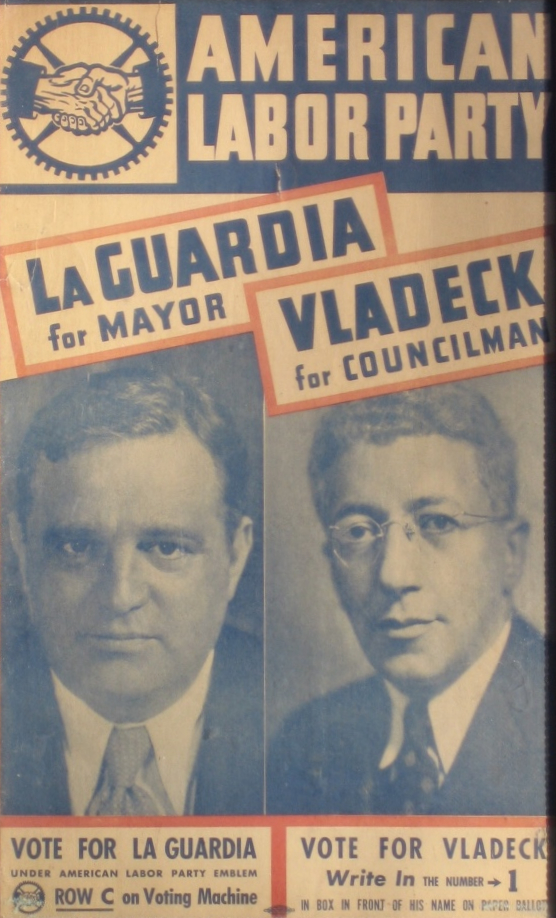
American Labor Party campaign poster featuring La Guardia and Jewish labor leader Baruch Charney Vladeck, 1937

La Guardia governed in an uneasy alliance with New York's Jews and liberal WASPs, together with ethnic Italians and Germans. An unorthodox Republican, he also ran as the nominee of the American Labor Party, a union-dominated anti-Tammany left wing group that supported Roosevelt for president beginning in 1936. La Guardia supported Roosevelt, chairing the Committee of Independent Voters for Roosevelt and his running mate, Henry A. Wallace, with Senator George W. Norris during the 1940 presidential election. La Guardia was the city's first Italian-American mayor, but was not a typical Italian New Yorker. He was a Republican Episcopalian who had grown up in Arizona and had a Triestine Jewish mother and a lapsed Catholic father. He spoke several languages; when working at Ellis Island, he was certified as an interpreter for Italian, German, Yiddish, and Croatian. It served him well during a contentious congressional campaign in 1922. When Henry Frank, a Jewish opponent, accused him of antisemitism, La Guardia rejected the suggestion that he publicly disclose that his mother was Jewish as "self-serving". Instead, La Guardia dictated an open letter in Yiddish that was also printed in Yiddish. In it, he challenged Frank to publicly and openly debate the issues of the campaign entirely in the Yiddish language. Frank, although he was Jewish, could not speak the language and was forced to decline—and lost the election.

La Guardia's 1933 campaign coincided with the rise of racial and religious hostilities in Germany, and he supported a more anti-Nazi response while in office. He publicly supported groups that engaged in boycotts of German goods and spoke alongside Rabbi Stephen S. Wise, leader of the American Jewish Congress. In 1935, La Guardia caused an international stir when he denied a masseur license to a German immigrant, stating that Germany had violated a treaty guaranteeing equal treatment of American professionals by discriminating against American Jews. Despite threats of retaliation from Germany and a bomb threat against New York City's German Consulate, La Guardia continued to use his position as mayor to denounce Nazism. During his reelection campaign in 1937, speaking before the Women's Division of the American Jewish Congress, he called for the creation of a special pavilion at the upcoming New York World's Fair, "a chamber of horrors" for "that brown-shirted fanatic," referring to Hitler. He also led anti-Nazi rallies and promoted legislation to facilitate the U.S. rescue of the Jewish refugees. He also appointed more racially and religiously diverse judges, including Rosalie Loew Whitney, Herbert O'Brien, Jane Bolin, and Hubert Thomas Delany. La Guardia would soon regret appointing O'Brien, who used his position as Domestic Relations judge to oppose some New Deal policies, leading to La Guardia's condemnation of him with the famous line, "Senator, I have made a lot of good appointments and I think I am good ... but when I make a mistake, it's a beaut."

=== Crime ===
La Guardia criticized the gangsters who brought a negative stereotype and shame to the Italian community. His first action as mayor was to order the chief of police to arrest mob boss Lucky Luciano on whatever charges could be found. La Guardia then went after the gangsters with a vengeance, stating in a radio address to the people of New York in his distinct voice, "Let's drive the bums out of town." In 1934 he went on a search-and-destroy mission looking for mob boss Frank Costello's slot machines, rounding up thousands of the "one armed bandits," swinging a sledgehammer and dumping them off a barge into the water for the newspapers and media. In 1935 La Guardia appeared at the Bronx Terminal Market to institute a citywide ban on the sale, display, and possession of artichokes, whose prices were inflated by mobsters. When prices went down, the ban was lifted. In 1936, La Guardia had special prosecutor Thomas E. Dewey, a future Republican presidential candidate, single out Lucky Luciano for prosecution. Dewey led a successful investigation into Luciano's lucrative prostitution operation, eventually sending Luciano to jail with a 30–50 year sentence. The case was made into the 1937 movie Marked Woman, starring Bette Davis.

La Guardia proved successful in shutting down the burlesque theaters, whose shows offended his sensibilities. He also came to the assistance of comic book creators Joe Simon and Jack Kirby, when they were openly threatened by sympathizers of Nazi Germany with their new superhero character, Captain America, when he arranged police protection. As part of his campaign against organized crime in the early 1940s, La Guardia banned pinball games, calling them gambling machines. The ban held until 1976, when avid player Roger Sharpe proved the actual skill involved in the game. La Guardia spearheaded major raids throughout the city, collecting thousands of machines. The mayor participated with police in destroying machines with sledgehammers before dumping the remnants into the city's rivers.

=== Public works ===
La Guardia's admirers credit him, among other things, with restoring the economy of New York City during and after the Great Depression. He is given credit for many massive public works programs administered by his powerful Parks Commissioner Moses, which employed thousands of voters. The mayor's relentless lobbying for federal funds allowed New York to develop its economic infrastructure.

To obtain large-scale federal money the mayor became a close ally of Roosevelt and New Deal agencies such as the CWA, PWA, and WPA, which poured $1.1 billion into the city from 1934 to 1939. In return, he gave FDR a showcase for New Deal achievements and helped to defeat FDR's political enemies in Tammany Hall (the Democratic party machine based in Manhattan). La Guardia and Moses built highways, bridges and tunnels, transforming the physical landscape of New York City. The West Side Highway, East River Drive, Brooklyn Battery Tunnel, Triborough Bridge, and two airports (LaGuardia Airport, and, later, Idlewild, now JFK Airport) were all built during his mayoralty.

In 1943, La Guardia saved the Mecca Temple on 55th Street from demolition. Together with New York City Council President Newbold Morris, La Guardia converted the building to the New York City Center of Music and Dance. On December 11, 1943, City Center opened its doors with a concert from the New York Philharmonic—La Guardia even conducted a rendition of "The Star Spangled Banner."

=== 1939 ===
1939 was a busy year, as he opened the 1939 New York World's Fair at Flushing Meadows–Corona Park, Queens, opened New York Municipal Airport No. 2 in Queens (later renamed Fiorello H. La Guardia Field), and had the city buy out the Interborough Rapid Transit Company and the Brooklyn–Manhattan Transit Corporation, thus completing the public takeover of the New York City Subway system. The U.S. arrival of Georg and Maria Von Trapp and their children from Austria that fall at Ellis Island who would eventually become the Trapp Family Singers was another significant decade-ending event that year in La Guardia's mayoralty.

=== Reform ===
Responding to popular disdain for the sometimes corrupt City Council, La Guardia successfully proposed a reformed 1938 City Charter that created a powerful new New York City Board of Estimate, similar to a corporate board of directors. La Guardia was also a supporter of the Ives-Quinn Act, "a law that would ban discrimination in employment on the bases of 'race, creed, color or national origin' and task a new agency, the New York State Commission Against Discrimination (SCAD), with education and enforcement." The bill passed in 1945, making New York the first state in the country to create an agency tasked with handling employment discrimination complaints.

=== World War II ===
In 1941 during the run-up to American involvement in World War II, President Roosevelt appointed La Guardia first director of the new Office of Civilian Defense (OCD). Roosevelt was an admirer of La Guardia; after meeting Winston Churchill for the first time he described him as "an English Mayor La Guardia". The OCD was the national agency responsible for preparing for blackouts, air raid wardens, sirens, and shelters in case of German air raids. The goal was to psychologically mobilize many thousands of middle-class volunteers to make them feel part of the war effort. At the urging of aviation advocate Gill Robb Wilson, La Guardia, in his capacity as Director of the OCD, created the Civil Air Patrol with Administrative Order 9, signed by him on December 1, 1941, and published December 8, 1941. La Guardia remained Mayor of New York, shuttling back and forth with three days in Washington and four in the city in an effort to do justice to two herculean jobs. La Guardia focused on setting up air raid systems and training volunteer wardens; however, Roosevelt appointed his wife Eleanor Roosevelt as his assistant. She issued calls for actors to lead a volunteer talent program, and dancers to start a physical fitness program. That led to widespread ridicule and the president replaced both of them in December 1941 with a full-time director James M. Landis.

The war ended the Great Depression in the city. Unemployment ended, and the city was a gateway for military supplies and soldiers sent to Europe, with the Brooklyn Navy Yard providing many of the warships and the garment trade providing uniforms. The city's great financiers, however, were less important in decision-making than the policymakers in Washington, and very high wartime taxes were not offset by heavy war spending. New York was not a center of heavy industry and did not see a wartime boom, as defense plants were built elsewhere. Roosevelt refused to make La Guardia a general and was unable to provide fresh money for the city. By 1944, the city was short of funds to pay for La Guardia's new programs. La Guardia was frustrated and his popularity slipped away and he ran so poorly in straw polls in 1945 that he did not run for a fourth term. In July 1945, when the city's newspapers were closed by a strike, La Guardia famously read the comics on the radio.

== Political positions ==
La Guardia opposed the Espionage Act of 1917 and stated that "if you pass this bill and if it is enacted into law you change all that our flag ever stood for and stands for". He supported the League of Women Voters in the 1920s. He voted in favor of the Child Labor Amendment. He proposed legislation to create a holiday in honor of Christopher Columbus.

As a congressman, La Guardia was a tireless and vocal champion of progressive causes, including relaxed restriction on immigration, removal of U.S. troops from Nicaragua to speaking up for the rights and livelihoods of striking miners, impoverished farmers, oppressed minorities, and struggling families. He supported progressive income taxes, greater government oversight of Wall Street, and national employment insurance for workers idled by the Great Depression. He supported allowing the direct election of the Governor of Puerto Rico.

In domestic policies, La Guardia tended toward socialism and wanted to nationalize and regulate; however, he was never close to the Socialist Party and never bothered to read Karl Marx. When Benito Mussolini's Fascist Italy invaded Ethiopia on October 3, 1935, a Black protest of Italian vendors at the King Julius General Market on Lenox Avenue and 118th Street turned into a riot and 1,200 extra New York City policemen were deployed on "war duty" to quell the riot. In December 1935, at an Italian-American rally, attended by 20,000, in Madison Square Garden, La Guardia presented a $100,000 check to the Italian Consul General, (Note: Probably G. Vecchietto, who was the consul on 24 October 1935.) part of a total $700,000 raised from Italian-Americans to help fund the invasion. During a new riot that began on May 18, 1936, in Lenox Avenue, Harlem, following reports of Italian atrocities and the fall of Addis Ababa, La Guardia rejected demands from the African-American community to withdraw additional police squads sent to contain the street fighting. This added to the perception within the Black community of Harlem that La Guardia represented Fascist Italy in New York.

=== Economics ===
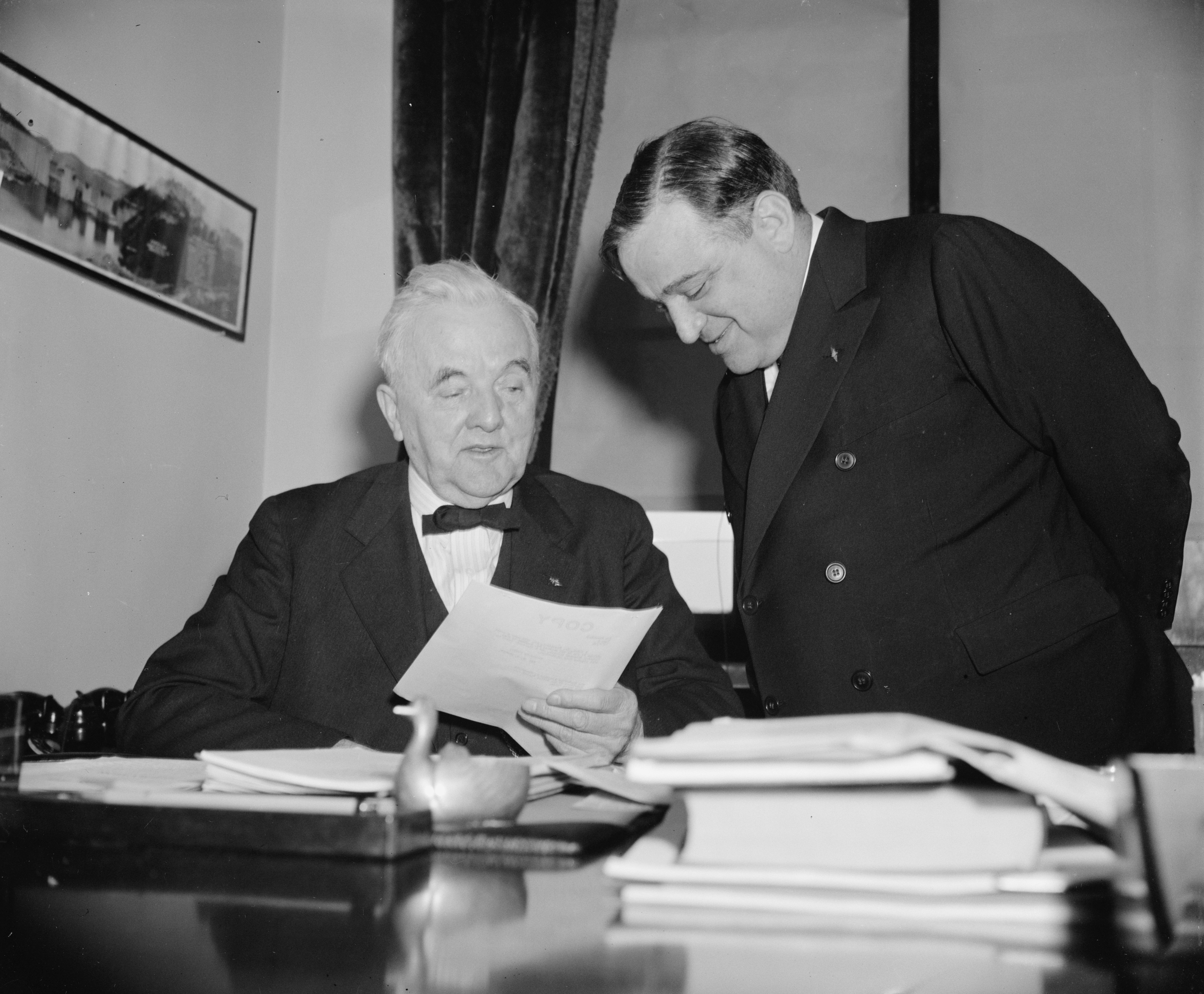
Senator George W. Norris of Nebraska (left) and mayor La Guardia in 1938

La Guardia sponsored labor legislation and railed against immigration quotas. His major legislation was the Norris–La Guardia Act, cosponsored with Nebraska senator George W. Norris in 1932. It circumvented Supreme Court limitations on the activities of labor unions, especially as those limitations were imposed between the enactment of the Clayton Antitrust Act in 1914 and the end of the 1920s. Based on the theory that the lower courts are creations not of the Constitution but of Congress, and that Congress, therefore, has wide power in defining and restricting their jurisdiction, the act forbids issuance of injunctions to sustain anti-union contracts of employment, to prevent ceasing or refusing to perform any work or remain in any relation of employment, or to restrain acts generally constituting component parts of strikes, boycotts, and picketing. It also said courts could no longer enforce yellow-dog contracts, which are labor contracts prohibiting a worker from joining a union. La Guardia opposed an attempt to raise the sales tax during the Great Depression and instead supported taxes on luxury items and a graduated income tax for people earning more than $100,000.

=== Foreign policy ===
La Guardia supported the League of Nations. He called for Fiume to be given to Italy despite it being promised to Yugoslavia by the Treaty of London. He supported the February Revolution, but criticized Ambassador David R. Francis for supporting Alexander Kerensky rather than Lavr Kornilov. La Guardia had a reputation for his disdain of isolationism; instead he supported using American influence abroad on behalf of democracy or for national independence or against autocracy. He used his influence to speak in favor of the League of Nations and the Inter-Parliamentary Union as well as peace and disarmament conferences.

In 1946, President Harry S. Truman sent the ex-mayor as an envoy to Brazil but diplomacy was not his forte. Truman then gave him a major job as head of the United Nations Relief and Rehabilitation Administration (UNRRA), with responsibility for helping millions of desperate refugees in Europe. La Guardia was exhausted and after seeing the horrors of war in Europe called for a massive aid program. Critics ridiculed that as worldwide WPA and the biggest boondoggle ever. He sided with Henry A. Wallace in calling for peaceful coexistence with the Soviet Union, and attacked the new breed of Cold Warriors. He provided UNRRA funds to the Soviets despite warnings that the Kremlin was funneling the money towards its military. UNRRA shut down at the end of 1946. Despite his declining health, La Guardia attacked the emerging "Truman Doctrine" that promised American financial and military intervention against communism.

=== Prohibition ===
La Guardia opposed Prohibition in the United States. He was one of the first Republicans in Congress to voice their opinions against prohibition. He testified to that effect before the first session of Congress in 1926. On June 19, 1926, La Guardia mixed near beer and malt extract, which were legal, to create 2% beer in order to protest prohibition. He was immune from prosecution as a member of Congress.

== Personal life ==
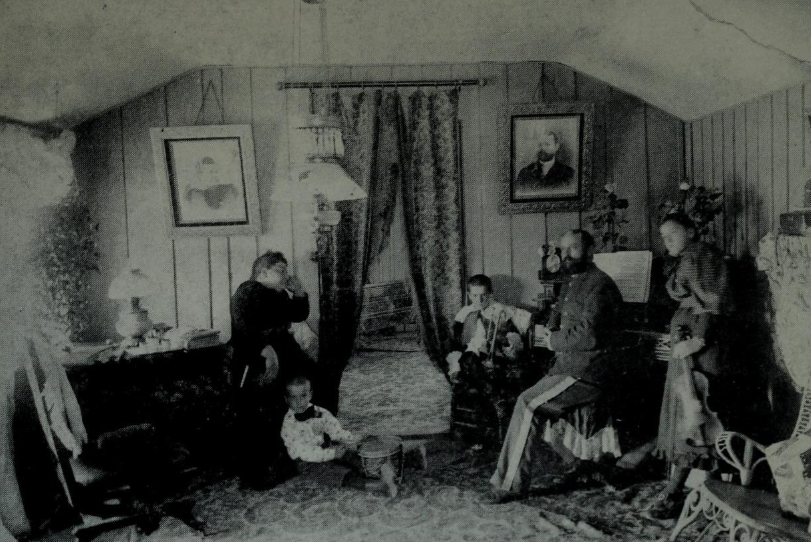
La Guardia and his family during their time at Fort Whipple, Arizona, in the 1890s

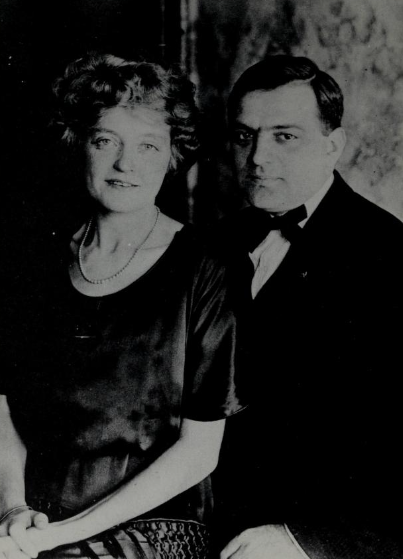
La Guardia and his wife Thea Almerigotti

La Guardia was a man of short stature; his height is sometimes given as 5 feet 0 inches (1.52 m), but an article in The New York Times in 2006 gave his height as 5 feet 2 inches (1.57 m).

La Guardia met Thea Almerigotti, an immigrant from Trieste, while marching in a union picket line in 1913. They married on March 8, 1919, in a Catholic ceremony at St. Patrick's Cathedral. Their daughter, Fioretta Thea La Guardia, was born in June 1920 but died on May 8, 1921, and Thea died on November 29. The death of his wife was described as "the greatest tragedy of La Guardia's life" by M.R. Werner, who aided La Guardia when he wrote his autobiography.

Marie Fisher, La Guardia's second wife, had volunteered for La Guardia's 1916 congressional campaign and became his secretary after his election. They were married by Rev. Ole J. Kvale, a Lutheran like Fisher, on February 28, 1929. They adopted two children:

- Eric Henry (1930–2024), a Hobart College graduate who became a professor at the University of Washington,
- Jean Marie (1928–1962), La Guardia's niece from his first marriage, the biological daughter of Thea's sister, a Barnard College graduate who later became an editor of Mademoiselle.

=== Nazi detention of sister, brother-in-law, and niece ===
La Guardia's sister, Gemma La Guardia Gluck, married Herman Gluck, a Hungarian Jew, in 1906. The couple later moved to Budapest. They were living in Hungary and were arrested by the Gestapo on June 7, 1944, Adolf Eichmann and Heinrich Himmler knew that Gemma was La Guardia's sister and ordered that she be held as a political prisoner. She and Herman were deported to Mauthausen concentration camp in Austria. Gemma did not learn until her release that Herman had died at Mauthausen. Gemma was transferred from Mauthausen to the notorious women's concentration camp at Ravensbrück, fifty miles from Berlin, where—unbeknownst to Gemma at the time—her daughter Yolanda (whose husband also died in the camps) and baby grandson were also held for a year in a separate barracks. Gemma Gluck, who was held in Block II of the camp and assigned prisoner #44139, was one of the few survivors of Ravensbrück, one of the few American-born women interned by the Nazis along with Virginia d'Albert-Lake, and wrote about her time there.

The Germans abandoned Gluck, her daughter, and her grandson for a possible hostage exchange in April 1945 as the Soviets advanced on Berlin. After the liberation of the camps, Gemma later wrote that the Soviets were "violating girls and women of all ages", and the three struggled as displaced persons in postwar Berlin because they did not speak German and had no identity papers, money, or means of documenting where they had been. Gemma finally managed to get word to the Americans, who contacted Fiorello, who was then director of the United Nations Relief and Rehabilitation Administration (UNRRA) and had been unable to locate his sister and brother-in-law since their disappearance. He worked to get them on the immigration lists but asserted in a letter, included in the appendix of Gemma's memoir, that her "case was the same as that of hundreds of thousands of displaced people" and "no exceptions can be made". It took two years for her to be cleared and sent to the United States. She returned to New York in May 1947, where she was reunited with her brother only four months before his death. As he had made no provision for her, she lived the remainder of her life in very reduced circumstances in a public housing project in Queens until her death in 1962.

== Death and legacy ==
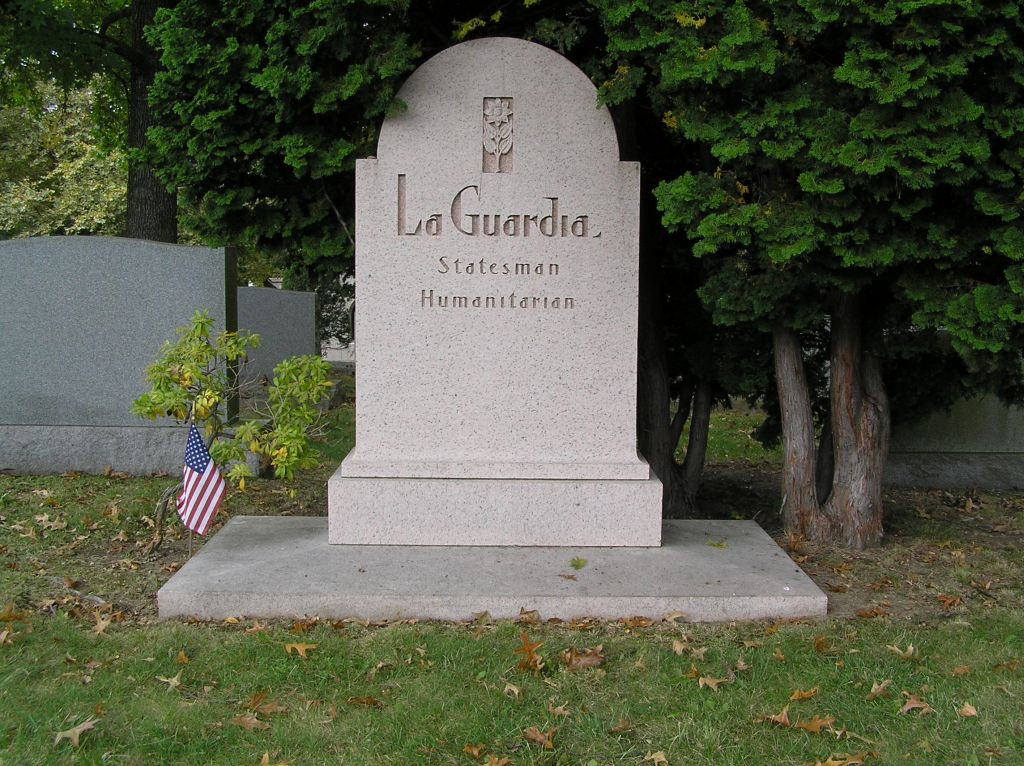
La Guardia's grave

La Guardia died of pancreatic cancer in his home at 5020 Goodridge Avenue, in the Fieldston neighborhood of Riverdale, Bronx, on September 20, 1947, aged 64. La Guardia is interred at Woodlawn Cemetery in the Bronx.

=== Legacy ===
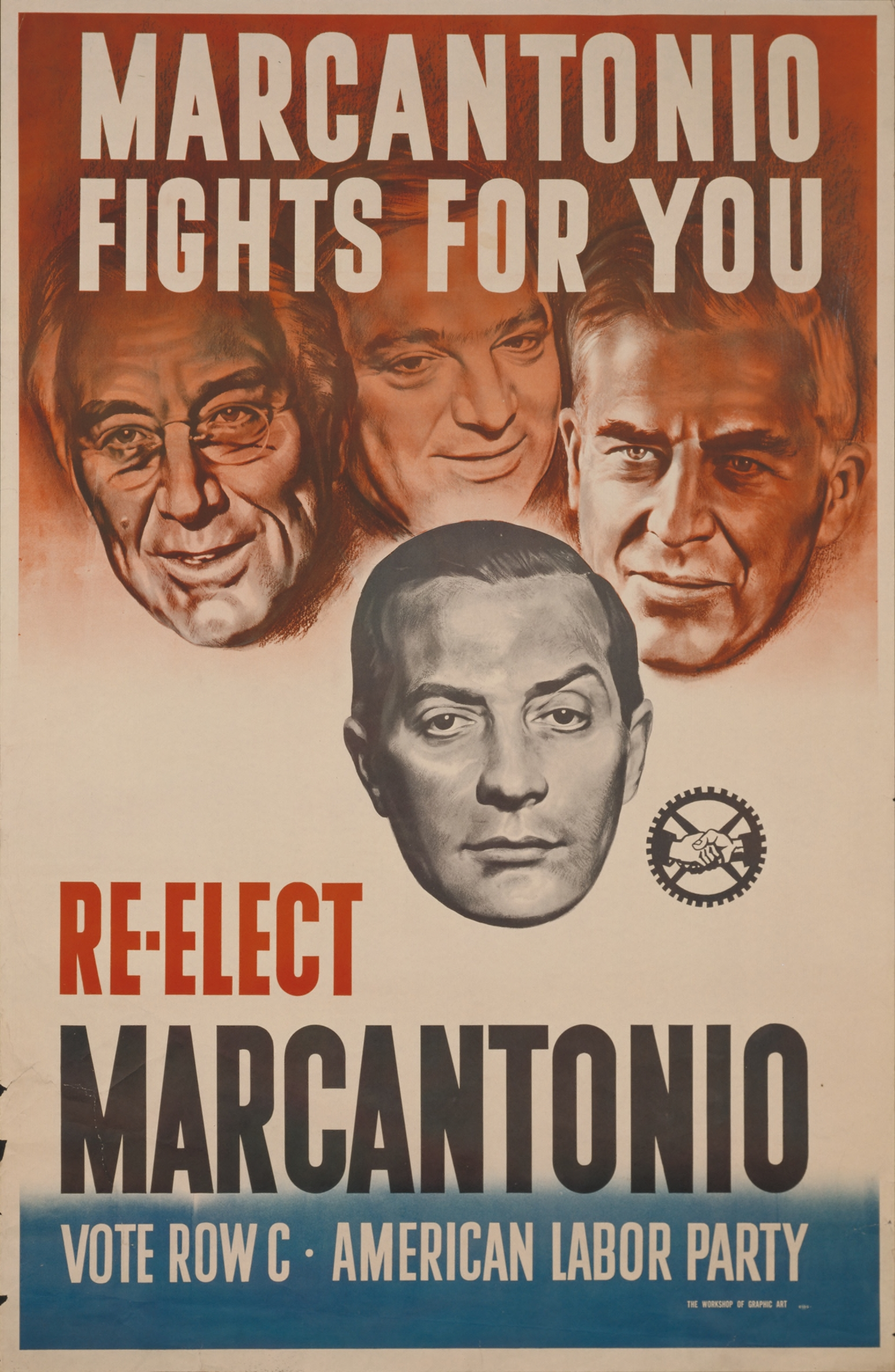
American Labor Party campaign poster featuring Vito Marcantonio as a candidate for reelection to Congress, 1948. Above him the faces of Franklin D. Roosevelt, La Guardia, and Henry A. Wallace look on.

A 1993 survey of historians, political scientists, and urban experts conducted by Melvin G. Holli of the University of Illinois at Chicago ranked La Guardia as the best American big-city mayor to serve between the years 1820 and 1993. According to a biographer, Mason B. Williams, his close collaboration with Roosevelt's New Deal proved a striking success in linking national money and local needs. La Guardia enabled the political recognition of new groups that had been largely excluded from the political system, such as Jews and Italians. His administration in cooperation with Moses gave New York its modern infrastructure. His far-sighted goals raised ambitions for new levels of urban possibility. According to Thomas Kessner, trends since his tenure mean that "people would be afraid of allowing anybody to take that kind of power".

=== Namesakes ===
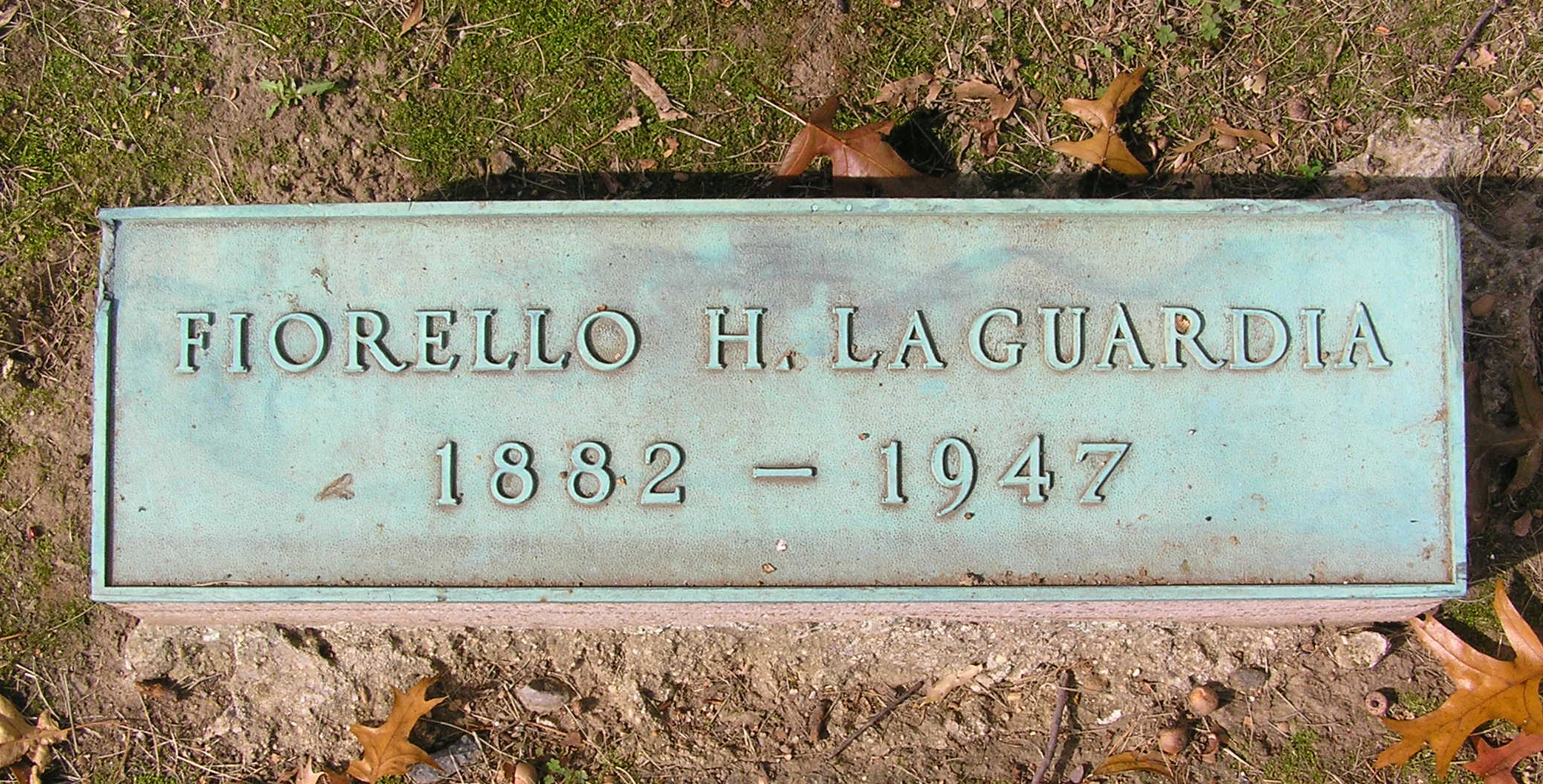
La Guardia's footstone

New York's LaGuardia Airport, LaGuardia Community College, LaGuardia Place, and various parks and buildings around New York City are named for him. Known for his love of music, La Guardia was noted for spontaneously conducting professional and student orchestras and was instrumental in the creation of the High School of Music & Art in 1936, now renamed the Fiorello H. LaGuardia High School of Music & Art and Performing Arts. During his mayoralty, in May 1935, the city's 258-acre shelter for its homeless and unemployed men in Chester, Orange County, New York was renamed Camp La Guardia. It operated under that name for 72 years before closing in 2006.

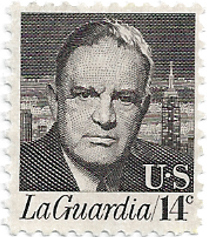
14¢ La Guardia U.S. postage stamp issued 1972

In 1972, the United States Postal Service honored La Guardia with a 14-cent postage stamp. In Tel Aviv, LaGuardia Street and LaGuardia interchange are named in his honor. A street in Rijeka, Croatia, is named after Fiorello La Guardia. La Guardia worked in Rijeka as a U.S. Consular Agent from 1903 to 1906, when the city was known as Fiume and was under Hungarian administration. It was during this time that Rijeka's port played a vital role in connecting the Austro-Hungarian Empire to the United States, featuring direct passenger service between Rijeka and New York.

== See also ==
- Statue of Fiorello H. La Guardia, Manhattan
- La Guardia and Wagner Archives
- 1938 NYC Teamsters Truckers Strike
- La Guardia Commission, a study on marijuana in U.S. society
- Timeline of New York City, 1930s–1940s
- Fiorello! (1959 Broadway musical)
- La Guardia Reads the Comics

== Publications ==
- La Guardia, Fiorello H. (1948). The Making of an Insurgent: An Autobiography. Philadelphia: J.B. Lippincott.

== Works cited ==
- Congressional Quarterly's Guide to U.S. Elections (2 ed.). Congressional Quarterly. 1985. ISBN 9780871873392.
- Bayor, Ronald H. (1993). Fiorello La Guardia: Ethnicity and Reform. Harlan Davidson. ISBN 0-88295-894-1.
- Jeffers, H. Paul (2002). The Napoleon of New York. pp. 275–90.
- Kessner, Thomas (1989). Fiorello H. LaGuardia and the Making of Modern New York. McGraw Hill Education. ISBN 0-07-034244-X.
- La Guardia Gluck, Gemma (2007) [1961]. Saidel, Rochelle (ed.). Fiorello's Sister: Gemma La Guardia Gluck's Story. Syracuse University Press. ISBN 978-0-8156-0861-5.
- Mann, Arthur (1959). La Guardia: A Fighter Against His Times, 1882-1933. J. B. Lippincott & Co.
- Williams, Mason B. (2013). City of Ambition: FDR, La Guardia, and the Making of Modern New York. New York: W.W. Norton. ISBN 978-0-393-06691-3.. online
- Zinn, Howard (1969). LaGuardia in Congress. Cornell University Press. ISBN 978-0-8014-7617-4.

U.S. House of Representatives
Preceded by Michael F. Farley	Member of the U.S. House of Representatives from New York's 14th congressional district 1917–1919	Succeeded by Nathan D. Perlman
Preceded by Isaac Siegel	Member of the U.S. House of Representatives from New York's 20th congressional district 1923–1933	Succeeded by James J. Lanzetta
Party political offices
Preceded by Frank Waterman	Republican nominee for Mayor of New York City; 1929	Succeeded by Lewis H. Pounds
Preceded by Lewis H. Pounds	Republican nominee for Mayor of New York City; 1933, 1937, 1941	Succeeded by Jonah J. Goldstein
Political offices
Preceded by John P. O'Brien	Mayor of New York City; 1934–1945	Succeeded by William O'Dwyer
New office	Director of the Office of Civilian Defense; 1941–1942	Succeeded by James Landis
Diplomatic posts
Preceded by Herbert H. Lehman	Director-General of the United Nations Relief and Rehabilitation Administration; 1946	Succeeded by Lowell Rooks
