= 1941 New York City mayoral election =

- November 4, 1941
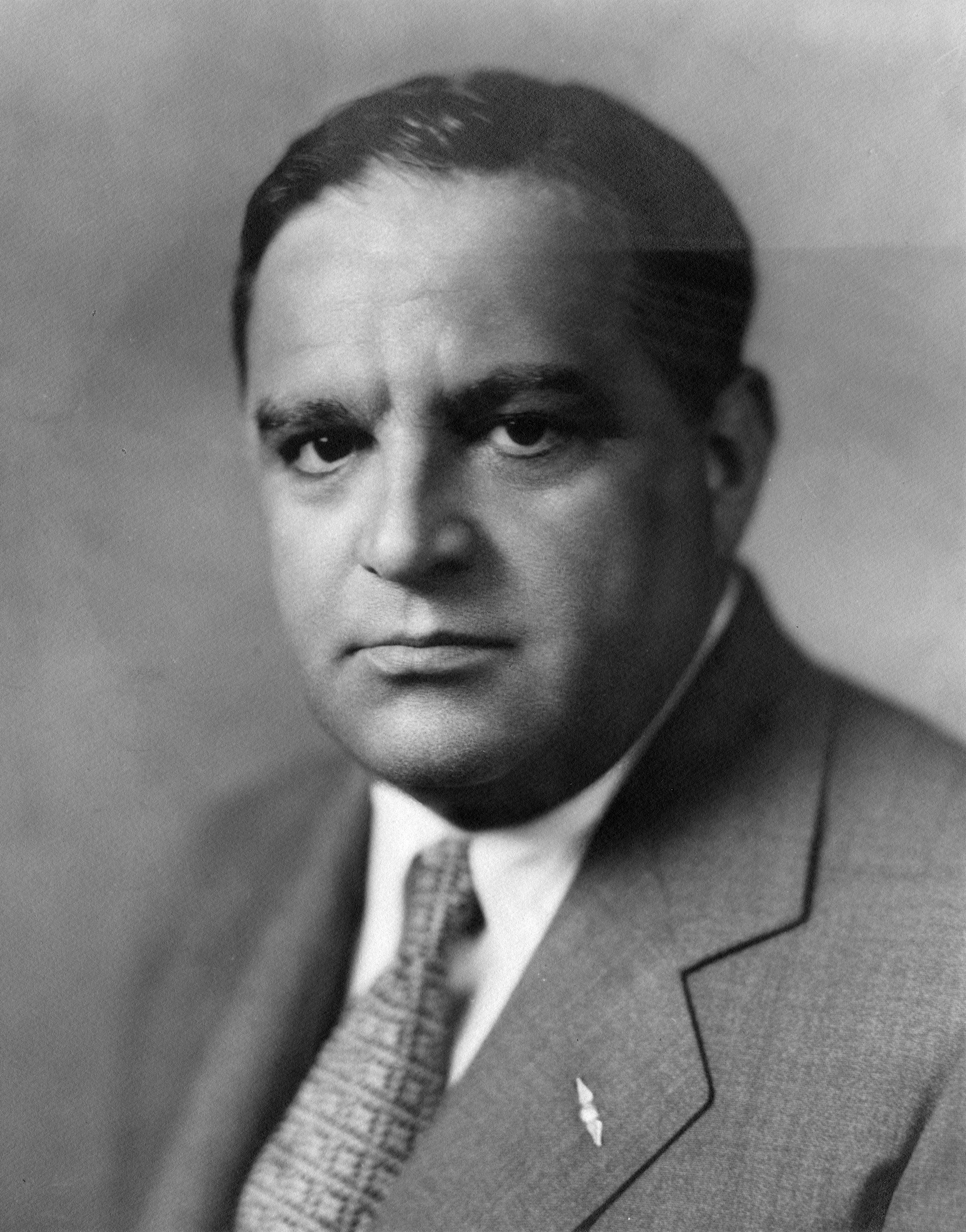

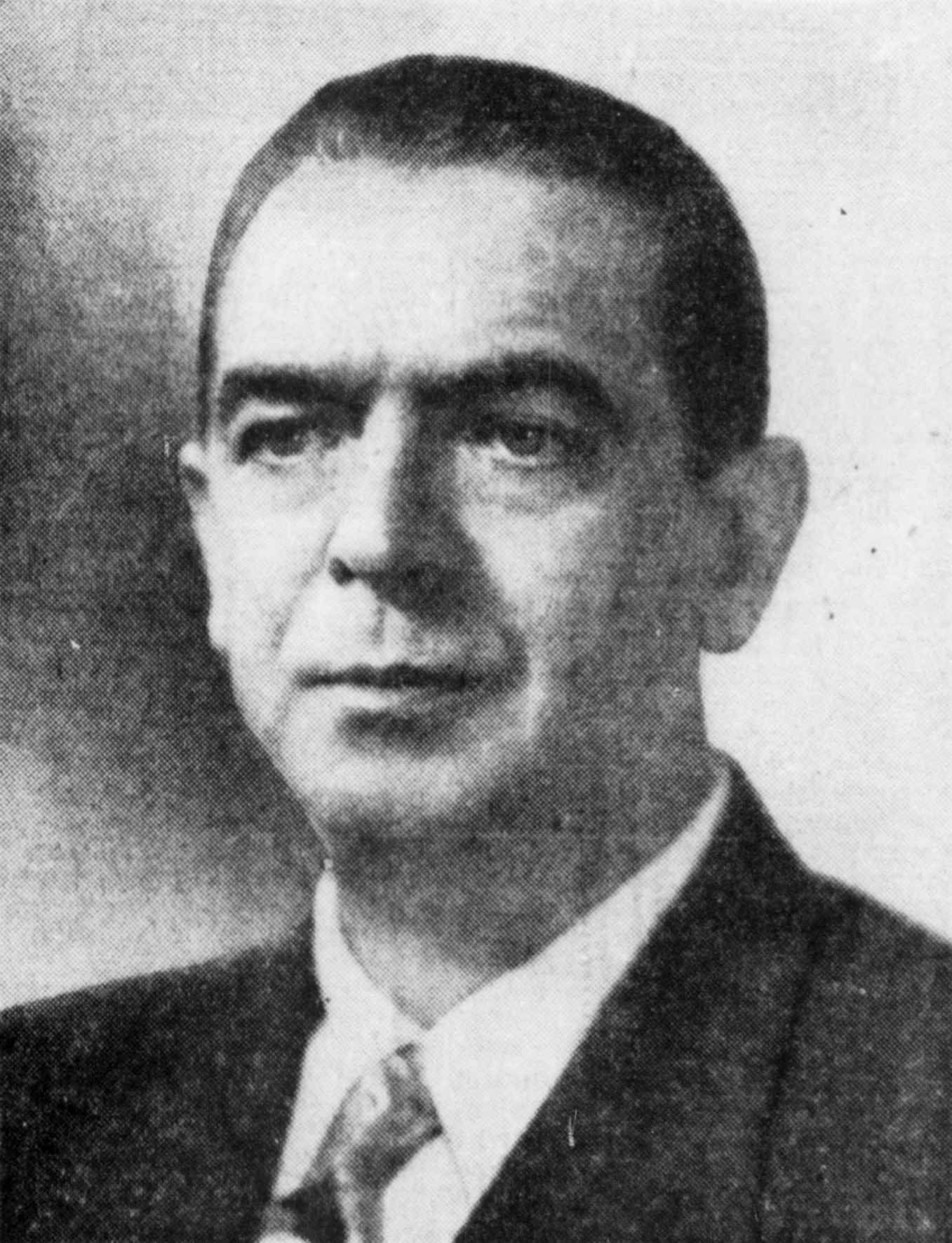
Candidate	Fiorello La Guardia	William O'Dwyer
Party	Republican	Democratic
Alliance	American Labor; City Fusion; United City
Popular vote	1,186,394	1,052,553
Percentage	52.4%	46.5%
- Borough results LaGuardia: 50–60% O'Dwyer: 60–70%
Mayor before election
Fiorello La Guardia
Republican
Elected mayor
Fiorello La Guardia
Republican

The New York City mayoral election of 1941 took place on November 4, 1941, in New York City. Incumbent mayor Fiorello La Guardia was re-elected to a third term in office over Kings County District Attorney William O'Dwyer. La Guardia, a Republican, was also the nominee of the American Labor Party, and additionally ran on the City Fusion and United City ballot lines.

Primary elections were held on September 16.

La Guardia won the contest with 52.35% of the vote. To date, he remains the last Republican mayoral candidate to carry the Bronx borough. A Republican would not be elected mayor of New York City again until 1965, and would not carry Brooklyn again until 1997. This was the only one of La Guardia's three successful mayoral campaigns that he did not carry all five boroughs.

== Republican primary ==
=== Candidates ===
- John R. Davies
- Fiorello La Guardia, incumbent mayor since 1934

=== Campaign ===
Davies criticized La Guardia as a "political interloper" and "avowed party enemy" who had "knif[ed]" Republican candidates Wendell Willkie, Thomas Dewey and Bruce Barton in the 1938 and 1940 elections.

During the campaign, La Guardia supporters unsuccessfully attempted to force Davies off the ballot by challenging his petition signatures.

=== Results ===
1941 Republican mayoral primary
Party	Candidate	Votes	%
Republican	Fiorello La Guardia (incumbent)	63,246	59.29%
Republican	John R. Davies	43,426	40.71%
Total votes		106,672	100.00%

After his defeat, Davies pledged a challenge to La Guardia on the anti-war and anti-New Deal "All American" independent ticket, but he ultimately withdrew from the general election after failing to get the required 7,500 signatures.

== General election ==
=== Candidates ===
- George W. Hartmann, Columbia University professor of educational psychology (Socialist)
- Fiorello La Guardia, incumbent mayor since 1934 (Republican, American Labor, Fusion and United City)
- William O'Dwyer, Kings County District Attorney (Democratic)

==== Withdrew ====
- John R. Davies (All American)

=== Results ===
1941 New York City mayoral election
Party	Candidate	Votes	%	±%
Republican	Fiorello La Guardia (incumbent)	668,763	29.55%	▼0.57
American Labor	Fiorello La Guardia (incumbent)	434,297	19.19%	▼1.59
City Fusion	Fiorello La Guardia (incumbent)	63,109	2.79%	▼4.39
United City	Fiorello La Guardia (incumbent)	20,225	0.89%	N/A
Total	Fiorello La Guardia (incumbent)	1,186,394	52.42%	▼7.75
Democratic	William O'Dwyer	1,052,553	46.51%	▲7.29
Socialist	George W. Hartmann	24,145	1.07%	N/A
Total votes		2,263,092	100.00%	

== See also ==
- Mayoralty of Fiorello La Guardia
