= 1929 New York City mayoral election =

- November 5, 1929
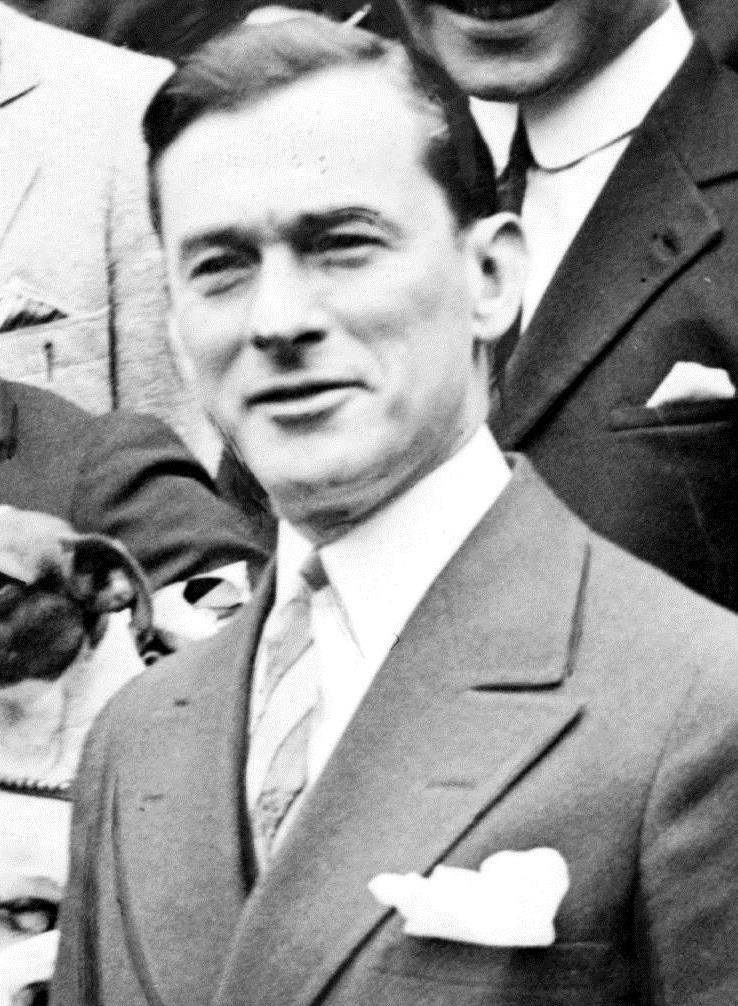

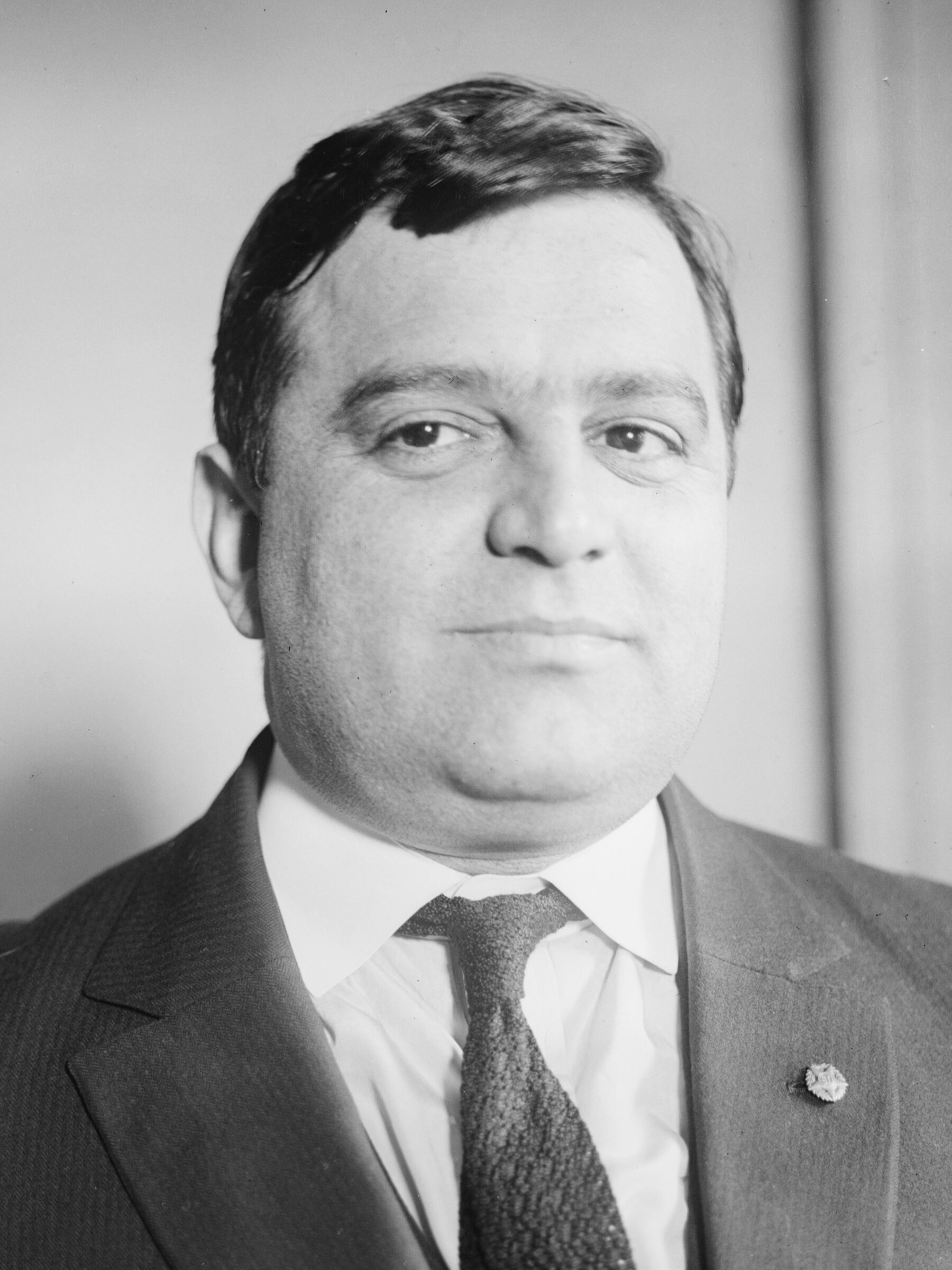

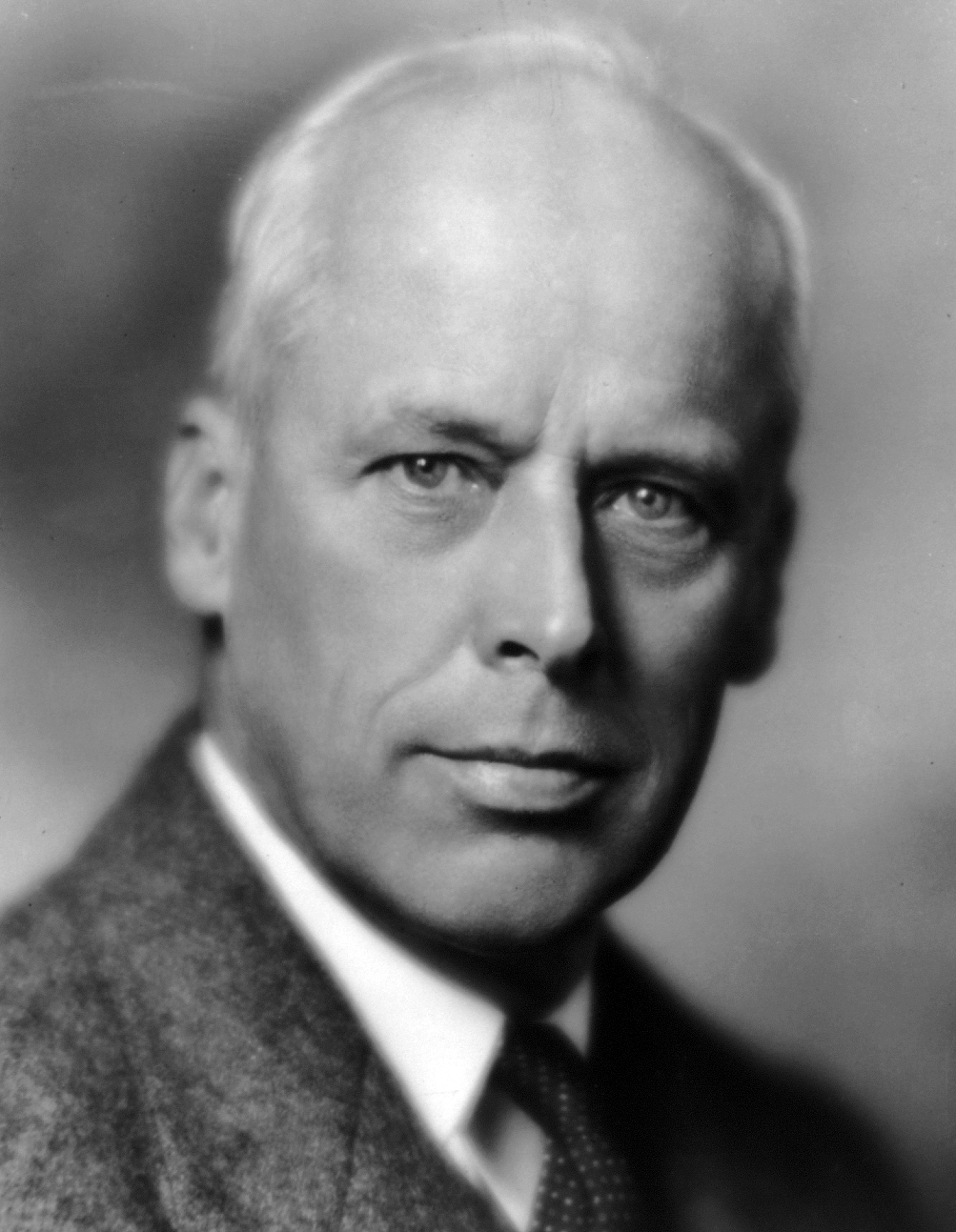
Nominee	Jimmy Walker	Fiorello H. La Guardia	Norman Thomas
Party	Democratic	Republican	Socialist
Popular vote	867,522	367,675	175,697
Percentage	60.70%	25.73%	12.29%
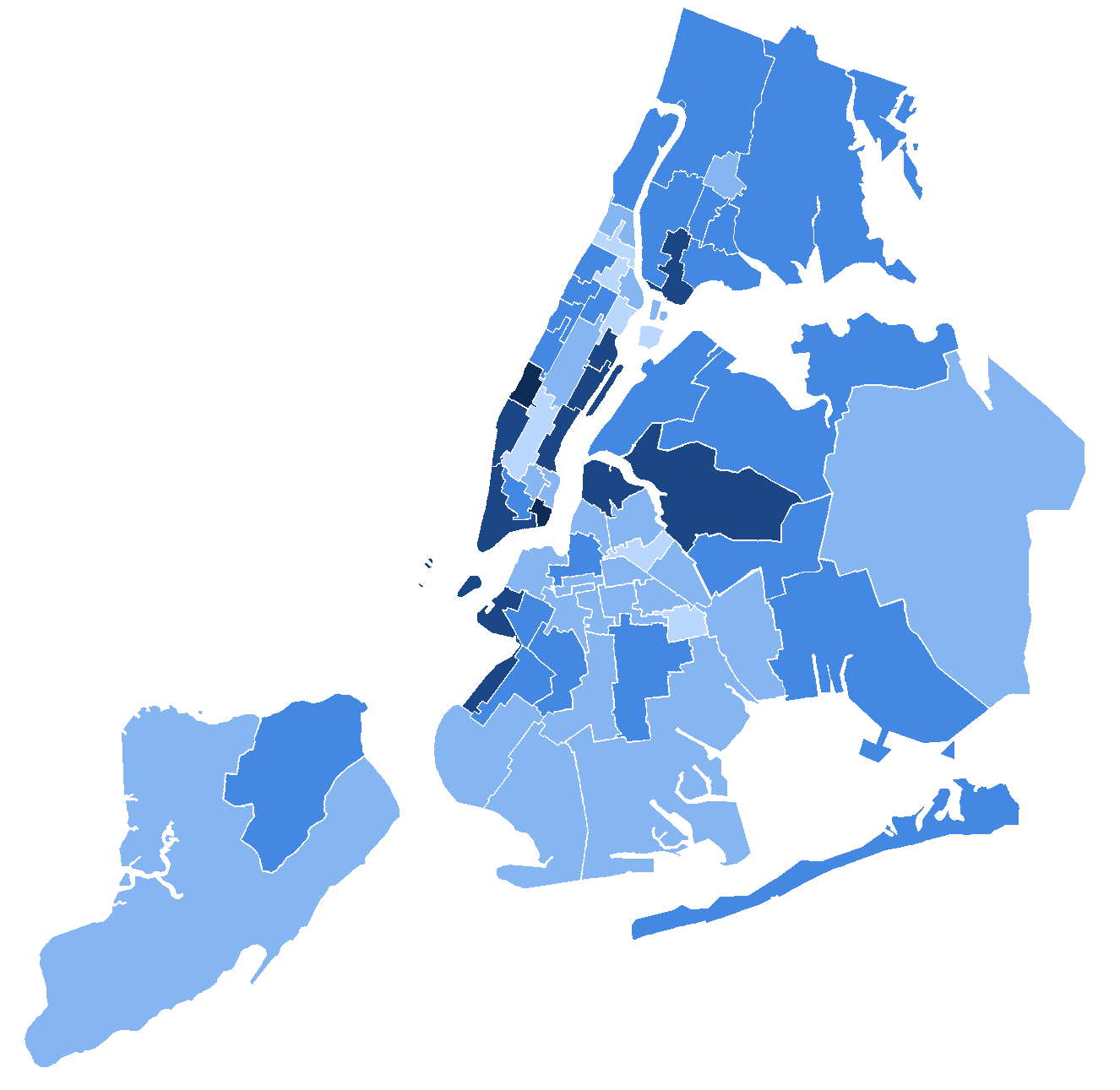
- Results by Assembly district Walker: 40–50% 50–60% 60–70% 70–80% 80–90%
Mayor before election
Jimmy Walker
Democratic
Elected mayor
Jimmy Walker
Democratic

The 1929 New York City mayoral election was held on November 5 in concert with other municipal elections. Democratic incumbent Jimmy Walker defeated Republican challenger Fiorello H. La Guardia in what was considered "a Crushing Defeat to [the] City G.O.P. [delivered]" by Tammany Hall. Socialist candidate Norman Thomas also ran, as did Socialist Labor candidate Olive M. Johnson and former Police Commissioner Richard Edward Enright for the Square Deal Party.

== Republican primary ==
=== Candidates ===
- Fiorello LaGuardia, U.S. Representative from East Harlem
- William M. Bennett, former State Senator from Manhattan and perennial candidate

La Guardia gave his acceptance speech at the Mecca Temple.

=== Results ===
1929 Republican mayoral primary
Party	Candidate	Votes	%
Republican	Fiorello LaGuardia	62,894	78.62%
Republican	William M. Bennett	17,100	21.38%
Total votes		79,994	100.00%

== General election ==
=== Results ===
Walker won with a plurality of 497,165 votes, which had been the largest ever recorded for a mayoral candidate up to that time. This record would stand for more than five years, being surpassed when the 1935 Chicago mayoral election was won by a plurality of 631,579.

Walker won the absolute majority of votes in all five boroughs. The results were part of a larger Democratic landslide in which Democrats won the position of President of the Board of Aldermen, Comptroller, all positions in Brooklyn, and all Borough Presidencies except Queens, and gained 2 seats in the Assembly and 3 in the Board of Aldermen from Republicans. Thomas's results were the highest recorded by the Socialist party to that date.

1929 mayoral election
Party	Candidate	Votes	%
Democratic	Jimmy Walker (inc.)	867,522	60.70%
Republican	Fiorello LaGuardia	367,675	25.73%
Socialist	Norman Thomas	175,697	12.29%
Socialist Labor	Olive M. Johnson	6,401	0.45%
Communist	William Weinstone	5,805	0.41%
Square Deal	Richard Enright	5,695	0.40%
Commonwealth Land	Lawrence W. Tracy	320	0.02%
Total votes		1,429,115	100.00%

== Aftermath ==
Despite his success, Walker would be embroiled in scandal in 1932 and forced to resign.

== Endorsements ==
Thomas Endorsements

Newspapers

- The Nation, weekly magazine

Organizations

- Citizens Union

== Works cited ==
- Mann, Arthur (1965). La Guardia Comes To Power 1933. J. B. Lippincott & Co.
- Soyer, Daniel (2021). Left in the Center: The Liberal Party of New York and the Rise and Fall of American Social Democracy. Cornell University Press. ISBN 9781501759888. JSTOR 10.7591/j.ctv1hw3x50.2.
