= Multicultural History Society of Ontario =

The Multicultural History Society of Ontario (MHSO) is a not-for-profit educational institution and archives located in Toronto, Canada. Established in 1976, the Multicultural History Society of Ontario collects, preserves, and makes available records of histories of migration and ethnicity.

== History ==
The MHSO was established in 1976 by Professor Robert F. Harney of the University of Toronto and a few close colleagues. They believed that the chronicling of immigrant and ethnic stories was essential to understanding Ontario history.

Professor Harney, a renowned scholar in the field of migration and ethnic studies, served as the MHSO's Academic Director from its establishment until his death in 1989.

Born in Salem, Massachusetts, Harney received a Bachelor of Arts degree from Harvard University and an M.A. and Ph.D. from the University of California, Berkeley. For twenty-five years, he taught history at the University of Toronto, where he stimulated and steered a generation of students. In 1989, he was appointed to the newly endowed Professorship and Program in Ethnic, Immigration, and Pluralism Studies. Following his death, this collaborative graduate program was renamed the Robert F. Harney Professorship and Program in his honour.

== Programs and services ==
The MHSO has produced and distributed publications, mounted and circulated exhibitions, and staged conferences, public lectures, and special events. In recent years, it has focused on virtual programming. The MHSO also provides professional and technical services and training to teachers and students, scholars and community historians, heritage and cultural organizations, and members of ethnocultural and indigenous communities.

An example of MHSO services is the case of Dr. Joseph Pivato whom Robert Harney invited to be Research Fellow for 1984 and edited the book, Contrasts: Comparative Essays on Italian-Canadian Writing (1985) and later held The Mariano Elia Chair in Italian-Canadian Studies at York University (1987–88). And thus inspired by Robert Harney he promoted research and publications in ethnic minority writing in Canada.

== Archives ==
The MHSO is the creator of an extensive collection of archival materials which document immigrant and ethnic experiences in Canada. Assisted by ethnic and indigenous associations and community researchers, the Society undertook oral history interviews, and collected historical photographs and personal and institutional textual records during the first decades of its operation.

More recently, it has undertaken additional collection activities in connection with specific projects. In the early 21st century, as a result of these efforts, more than 50 ethnocultural communities and First Nations, and some 240 municipalities in every region of the province are represented in the MHSO's archival holdings.

== See also ==
- History of Canada
- History of Ontario
- Multiculturalism in Canada
