= James J. Lanzetta =

American politician (1894–1956)

James Lanzetta
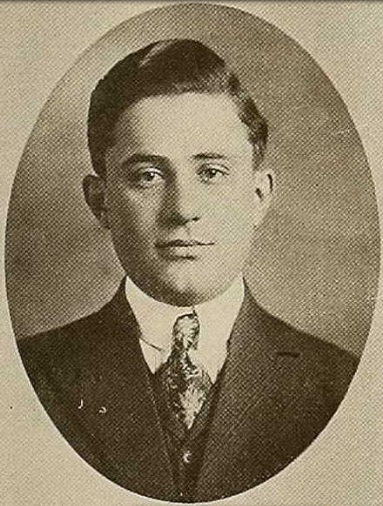
- Lanzetta in the Columbia University yearbook, 1917

Member of the U.S. House of Representatives from New York's 20th district
- In office January 3, 1937 – January 3, 1939
- Preceded by: Vito Marcantonio
- Succeeded by: Vito Marcantonio
- In office March 4, 1933 – January 3, 1935
- Preceded by: Fiorello LaGuardia
- Succeeded by: Vito Marcantonio

Personal details
- Born: December 21, 1894 New York City
- Died: October 27, 1956 (aged 61) Broadway
- Resting place: Woodlawn Cemetery, The Bronx, New York
- Party: Democratic
- Spouse: Ethel Lanzetta
- Education: New York University; Fordham University
- Occupation: Lawyer, jurist

James Joseph Lanzetta (IPA: [lanˈtsetta]) (December 21, 1894 – October 27, 1956) was an engineer, an attorney and a politician, a member of the United States House of Representatives from New York for two non-consecutive terms, the first from 1933 to 1935 and the second between 1937 and 1939, and a justice in city court. He was appointed as a legislative representative for the government of Puerto Rico in Washington, DC. After that he served as a city magistrate in New York, and in 1947 was appointed as a justice to the Domestic Relations Court, where he served until his death.

== Early life and education ==
Born in New York City, he attended its public schools. He graduated from the Columbia University School of Engineering in 1917. He later enrolled in Fordham University School of Law, where he graduated in 1924.

== Military service ==
Lanzetta joined the United States Army for World War I as a private in Company C, 302nd Engineers, and he was later a sergeant first class in the 1st Air Service Mechanics Regiment. Lanzetta served overseas from February 1918 to July 1919.

== Career ==
He worked as an engineer and salesman in New York City from 1919 to 1922, and as an assistant supervisor in the city's Department of Markets from 1922 to 1925. He was admitted to the bar in 1925 and commenced practice in New York City.

== Political career ==
Active in politics as a Democrat, he served on the Board of Aldermen from January 1932 to March 1933.

=== Congress ===
With the help of the Tammany Hall boss Jimmy Hines, Lanzetta was elected as a Democrat to the 73rd Congress. He defeated the incumbent Congressman Fiorello H. La Guardia.

He represented the 20th district (then East Harlem) and served from March 4, 1933, to January 3, 1935. In 1934, in a close race with Vito Marcantonio, he lost his bid for re-election to the 74th Congress. In 1936, he won back his seat in the 75th Congress (causing Marcantonio to suffer his first defeat in what became a long Congressional career), serving from January 3, 1937, to January 3, 1939. He ran again in 1938 and 1940, losing both times to Marcantonio, who by then had switched to the American Labor Party.

Embittered by his loss to Marcantonio, in a letter to Martin Dies, the Chair of the House Committee on Un-American Activities, Lanzetta suggested that the House refuse to seat Marcantonio because, as the head of a "Communist front organization (International Labor Defense).... he must of necessity believe in communism and the overthrow of our present form of government."

=== Later career ===
After Lanzetta's 1938 defeat for re-election, he was appointed as legislative representative or counsel for Puerto Rico in Washington, D.C. Although he had never visited the island, he proved popular with its political leaders of all parties and with the residents of Puerto Rico.

Lanzetta later resumed the practice of law. On July 2, 1947, Mayor William O'Dwyer appointed him as city magistrate of New York City to fill a vacancy; later that month he was appointed to a full ten-year term. As the result of a one-day shortage of magistrates in March 1948, Lanzetta attracted notice by presiding in five courts in five hours and disposing of 500 cases, 400 of which were in the Downtown Traffic Court.

He served as city magistrate until May 26, 1948, when Mayor O'Dwyer appointed him to a ten-year term as a justice of the city Domestic Relations Court. He served in this capacity until his death in New York City in 1956.

== Death ==
He died on the night of October 27, 1956, while visiting the Greystone Hotel on Broadway. He is buried in Woodlawn Cemetery, The Bronx, New York.

U.S. House of Representatives
Preceded by Fiorello H. La Guardia	Member of the U.S. House of Representatives from New York's 20th congressional district 1933–1935	Succeeded by Vito Marcantonio
Preceded by Vito Marcantonio	Member of the U.S. House of Representatives from New York's 20th congressional district 1937–1939	Succeeded by Vito Marcantonio
