= Thomas Kessner =

American historian

Thomas Kessner is an American historian, a distinguished professor at City University of New York, and an author.

== Education ==
Kessner is a graduate of Brooklyn College (1963) and earned his doctorate at Columbia University in 1975 with distinction.

== Career ==
He was appointed as distinguished professor at Graduate Center of the City University of New York in 2005. His special areas of interest are American urban and social history and the history of New York City.

He has served as a consultant to the New York City Board of Education, the Ellis Island Museum, the New-York Historical Society, the Museum of the City of New York, and many other scholarly and professional institutions. He was also an associate editor for The Encyclopedia of New York City and has directed more than half a dozen NEH summer seminars for college and high school teachers.

== Selected works ==
=== Books ===
- The Flight of the Century: Charles A. Lindbergh and the Rise of American Aviation (2010)
- Capital City: New York City and the Men Behind America’s Rise to Economic Dominance, 1860–1900 (2003)
- Fiorello H. LaGuardia and the Making of Modern New York (1989)
- The Golden Door (1977), a study of immigrant life and economic mobility in New York City.

co-authored with Betty Boyd Caroli

- Today's Immigrants, Their Stories: A New Look at the Newest Americans (1983)

=== Articles ===
- "The New Deal", Gilder Lehrman Institute of American History

== Awards ==
Kessner’s work has garnered awards and fellowships from the Rockefeller Foundation, the National Endowment for the Humanities, and the American Council of Learned Societies.
