= Ives–Quinn Act =

1945 anti-discrimination law in New York

The Ives–Quinn Act of 1945 (sometimes referred to as the Quinn–Ives Act) is a landmark anti-discrimination law in New York, United States.

== Contents of the act ==
The Ives–Quinn Act was based on guidelines laid out by the Fair Employment Practice Committee, an anti-discrimination program established by Franklin D. Roosevelt's administration.

The act was designed to prevent discrimination in employment, specifically naming "employment without discrimination" as a civil right. It created the State Commission against Discrimination (later renamed to the New York State Division of Human Rights) and allocated funding for the board of commissioners. The commission was given policy-making power in the area of civil rights, granted the ability to investigate claims of discrimination, and a process was outlined for complaints to be made to the commission.

== History ==
The Ives–Quinn Act was supported by a coalition of progressive activists and organizations, including the NAACP, ACLU, American Jewish Congress, Thurgood Marshall, and Mike Quill. Despite the strong liberal slants of those supporters, it also received bipartisan support from prominent government officials, including Thomas E. Dewey, then-Governor of New York.

The bill was passed by the New York Assembly with 109 in favor and 32 opposed. It passed in the New York Senate on March 5, 1945, with 49 in favor and 6 opposed. During the vote, members of both the Democratic and Republican parties praised the governor for his support of the bill. Dewey signed the act into law on March 12, 1945.

== Aftermath ==
At the time of its passing, the bill was the most comprehensive ban on racial and religious discrimination in the United States.

Because the act banned employment discrimination in New York, it had a ripple effect on industries with national reach. Branch Rickey, general manager of the Brooklyn Dodgers, used the signing of the bill to plan a racial integration program for his team and went on to sign Jackie Robinson, breaking baseball's color barrier.

== See also ==
- Thomas E. Dewey
- Irving Ives
