= Travelers Aid International =

Travelers organization

Travelers Aid International is a global network that serves as a human services support system worldwide by facilitating interactions between social service agencies, airports, train stations, and other transit hubs in order to help children and adults who become stranded while traveling or are in distress or at risk of harm as a result of travel.

== History ==
The Travelers Aid movement began in St. Louis, Missouri, under the leadership of Mayor Bryan Mullanphy. Its purpose was to provide assistance to American pioneers and new immigrants who became stranded on their journeys. At the time of his death in 1851, Mullanphy left a bequest of a half million dollars in his will to help "aid travelers going west."

By the 20th century, Travelers Aid Societies had sprung up in major cities across the country. The programs protected stranded travelers, especially women and children, from others who would use, abuse, or victimize them. The primary fear was that young women travelers, native born and immigrant alike, would be kidnapped and turned into "white slaves" (defined as white women forced into prostitution). Therefore, Travelers Aid Societies, most notably the Travelers Aid Society of New York, provided social work to vulnerable travelers at train stations and piers in order to prevent their falling victim to the white slave trade and related vices. Although many of the Travelers Aid programs were started by religious communities, services were often provided regardless of beliefs. It is the oldest non-religious social welfare organization in the United States.

== Unification ==
The founder of the Travelers Aid Society of New York (TAS-NY), Grace Hoadley Dodge, had hoped to unite other Travelers Aid Societies to form a national association, but she died in 1914 before this could be accomplished. Due primarily to the efforts of TAS-NY General Secretary Orin Clarkson Baker, national unification was finally accomplished in 1917.

== Assistance ==
This national association provided a "chain of service", with one agency helping another when intercity transportation of a client was required. Travelers Aid was one of the original "United Service Organizations" (USO) that provided assistance to traveling service men and women, operating 175 troop transit lounges. Today, Travelers Aid responds to the specific needs of the community. Although each member agency shares the original service of assisting stranded travelers, many Travelers Aid agencies provide shelter for the homeless, transitional housing, job training, counseling, local transportation assistance, and other programs.

Similar organizations were founded in other countries; in Great Britain and many other countries it is spelled as "Travellers' Aid Society", and originally was closely associated with the YWCA.

== See also ==
- Travelers Aid Family Services of Boston
