= Travelers Aid Family Services of Boston =

Travelers Aid Family Services
- Founded: 1916
- Location: Boston, MA, USA
- Organization Type: Non-profit
- Now Known As: FamilyAid Boston
- Current President: Kip A. Sanford
- Website: http://www.familyaidboston.org/Home.aspx

The Travelers Aid Family Services (TAFS) was originally formed as a volunteer based social service organization seeking to provide resources for the massive numbers of immigrants arriving in the United States during the mid to late 1900s. Boston's branch, Travelers Aid Family Services of Boston, worked to assist immigrants arriving at the city's many train stations and boating docks. Today, TAFS has evolved into the non-profit organization FamilyAid Boston, working to end homelessness within the city of Boston, Massachusetts.

== Historical overview ==
Established in 1916, TAFS services included but were not limited to, helping travelers find housing and employment opportunities, as well as directions and transportation to future destinations. Known as a nondiscriminatory organization, TAFS helped those from all walks of life such as immigrants, stranded travelers and the poor that arrived at Boston’s train stations and docks. Four years later in 1920, TAFS was incorporated and became known as the Travelers Aid Society of Boston. TAFS's Boston branch joined the ranks of hundreds of other Travelers Aid Societies assisting lost travelers throughout the entire country.

== Mission ==
In more recent years, Travelers Aid has adjusted their main mission and social services to be more fitting of the times. Many of Boston's current homeless population are no longer off-the-boat immigrants. They are mostly long-established residents. As such, Travelers Aid has begun to help Boston's residents that have fallen on tough times and have become unsettled as a result. Their annual budget funds affordable housing projects and also provides social services like job hunting and temporary lodging.

== FamilyAid Boston ==
TAFS still exists in the city of Boston, Massachusetts. The organization has been renamed as FamilyAid Boston and continues to serve as non-profit social service for Bostonians in need. FamilyAid Boston adopted a more modernized social mission, moving away from strictly helping stranded or lost travelers as they did in the 1900s. Homelessness prevention and support services are FamilyAid Boston's main focus as their current mission statement is "to prevent and end homelessness, one family at a time." Although the organization has shifted its mission's focus, they have continued to build homeless and emergency shelters, as well as advocating for affordable housing projects throughout the city as they did in the past.

=== Current programs ===
FamilyAid Boston offers a multitude of social services that work to prevent the cycle of homelessness within Boston. Many of these programs require referrals from state and city social service agencies in order for individuals to be eligible.

- HOMES Program: FamilyAid Boston owns and manages six housing units providing permanent and affordable housing to families who have previously suffered from homelessness. Families residing in these units receive life skills training on topics such as budgeting and other financial processes.
- 24/7 Emergency Shelter: This program provides shelter to families with no other options.
- Stabilization Team Services: This team works with individuals who have recently moved into permanent housing. FamilyAid Boston works to maintain housing stabilization by assisting these individuals with "tenancy and case management support, connections to community resources and employment and career counseling."
- Employment Services: FamilyAid Boston provides a number of employment services, helping jobless individuals find employment throughout the city. Services include but are not limited to the following:
  - "Individualized job search and job retention strategies
  - Hot Job postings, workshops, events calendars and support groups
  - Access to Internet workstations to research job boards, employer websites and community resources
  - One-on-one help preparing resumes, cover letters and job applications
  - Direct referrals of qualified candidates for appropriate positions with our employer partners
  - Post-placement support with workplace issues as needed
  - Referrals to community partners, vocational training programs and educational opportunities"

=== Board of directors ===
- Kip A. Sanford, President
- Daniel Halston, Vice President
- C. Richard Carlson, Treasurer
- Regina Norfolk, Secretary
- Charles Y. Deknatel
- Jan Griffin
- Pierce Haley
- Jay C. Hart
- Priscilla Hunt
- Christopher W. Kelly
- Bruce W. Liddell
- Stephanie E. Lyons
- David Mancuso
- Michael McCormack
- Lora McCray
- Mary L. McHugh
- Richard E. Ring
- Laura Scott
- W. Paul White

== See also ==
- Boston
- Travelers Aid International
- Travelers Aid Society of New York
- Homelessness
- Nonprofit Organization
