= History of New York City (1898–1945) =

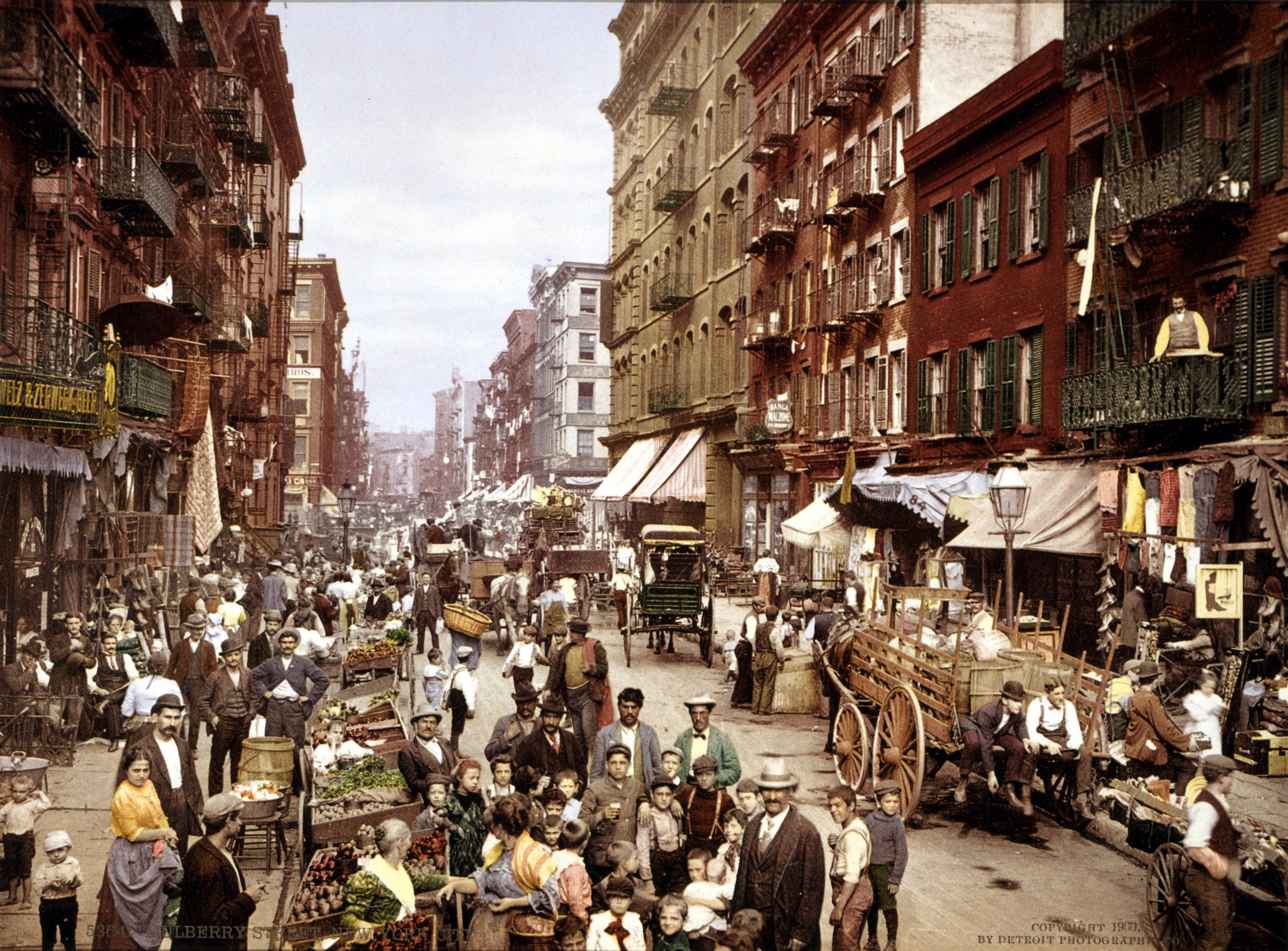
Mulberry Street, on the Lower East Side, circa 1900

During the years of 1898–1945, New York City consolidated. New York City became the capital of national communications, trade, and finance, and of popular culture and high culture. More than one-fourth of the 300 largest corporations in 1920 were headquartered there.

The era began with the formation of the consolidated city of the five boroughs in 1898, with a total population of 3.4 million. New transportation links, especially the New York City Subway, opened in 1904, bound together the new metropolis. Increased immigration of Catholic and Jewish workers from Southern and Eastern Europe expanded the labor force until the World War ended immigration in 1914. Labor shortages during the war attracted African Americans from the Southeast, who headed north as part of the Great Migration. They sponsored the Harlem Renaissance of literature and culture celebrating the black experience.

The Roaring Twenties were years of glamour and wealth, highlighted by a construction boom, with skyscrapers built higher and higher in the famous skyline. New York's financial sector came to dominate the national and the world economies. The economy of New York City prospered after 1896, with a few short dips, until the decade-long Great Depression, which began with a Wall Street stock market crash in late 1929. The economy recovered by 1940 and flourished during the World War II years. The main bases of the economy were construction, ocean shipping, garments, machine tools, and printing. Labor unions rose and fell and rose again. New York boasted the nation's strongest financial system, a large upscale market for luxury goods, and a flourishing high culture based on many philanthropists, museums, galleries, universities, artists, writers, and publications.

The Democratic political machines in the boroughs generally controlled politics. However, they were finally overthrown in 1933 by reformers who elected and repeatedly re-elected Fiorello La Guardia. Heavy federal patronage helped convert the city into a stronghold of the New Deal coalition and the model of heavy government spending on infrastructure.

== Progressive Era: 1890s–1920s ==
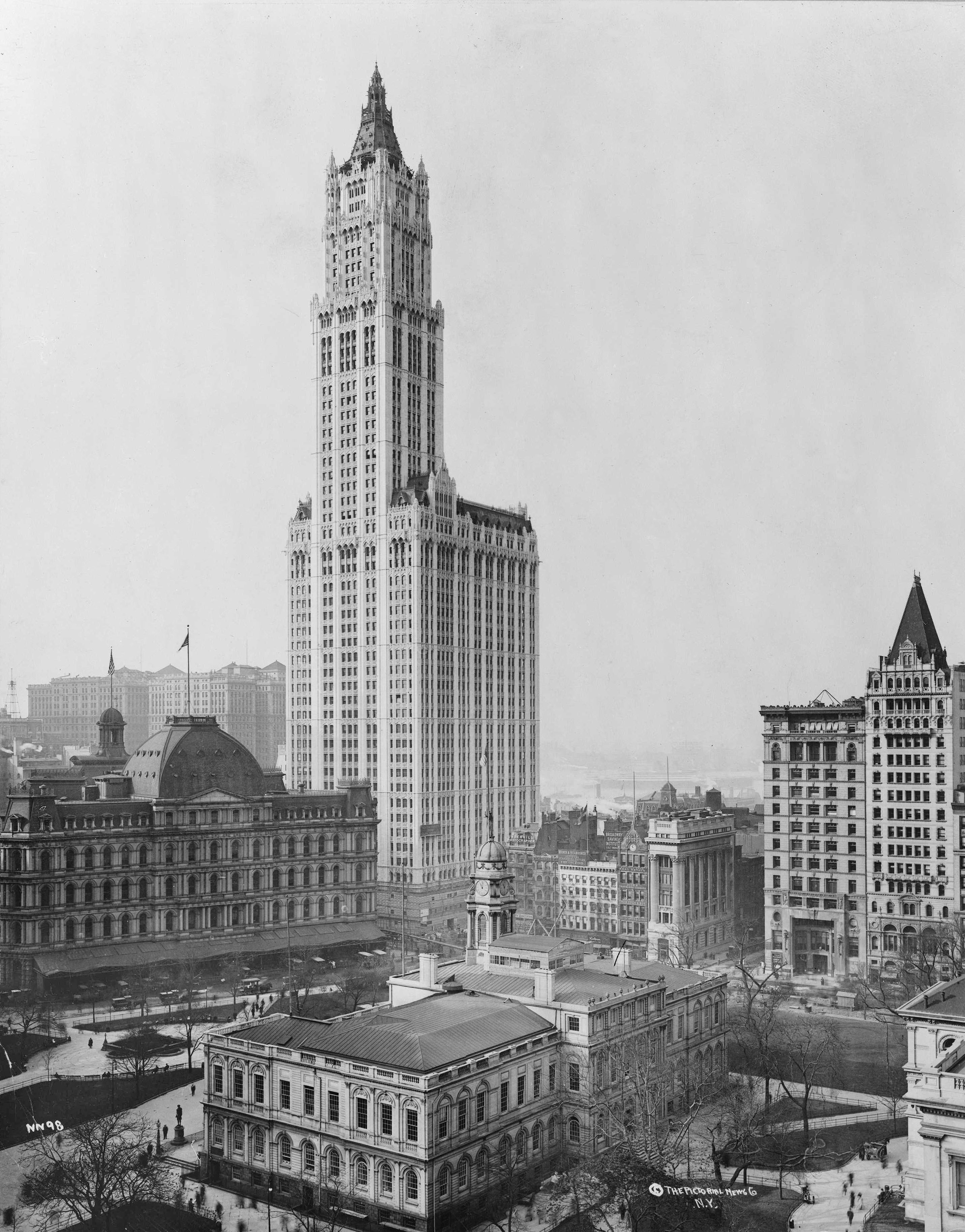
The Woolworth Building, built in 1913

The modern five boroughs, comprising the city of New York, were united in 1898. In that year, the cities of New York—which then consisted of present-day Manhattan and the Bronx—and Brooklyn were both consolidated with the counties of Queens and Staten Island. The total population was 3.4 million in 1900, leaping to 5.6 million in 1920 and leveling off at 7.9 million in 1950. The population was highly diverse in ethnicity, race, religion and class.

The city went through an enormous growth in population, industry, and wealth. Major achievements included the building of the subway system by commercial companies. The city funded major new bridges between Manhattan and Brooklyn and Queens, which enabled commuting and the rise of an industrial base there. The city also expanded its port facilities, improved its traffic system, built hundreds of new elementary and high schools, and engaged in large-scale public health programs. Many early skyscrapers, including several of the world's tallest buildings, were erected in Manhattan.

=== Machine politics versus the reformers ===
The politics of the consolidated city revolved around conflicts between the political machines and the reformers. In the quiet times, the machines had a solid core of supporters and usually exercised control of city and borough affairs; they also played a major role in the state legislature in Albany. Tammany Hall from the 1880s and onward built a strong network of local clubs that attracted ambitious middle-class ethnics. In times of crisis however, especially in the severe depressions of the 1890s and the 1930s, the reformers took control of key offices, notably the mayor's office. The reformers were never unified; they operated through a complex network of independent civic reform groups, each focusing its lobbying efforts on its own particular reform agenda. Membership included civic-minded, well-educated middle-class men and women, usually with expert skills in a profession or business, who deeply distrusted the corruption of the machines. Consolidation in 1898 multiplied the power of these reform groups, whenever they could agree on a common agenda such as consolidation itself.

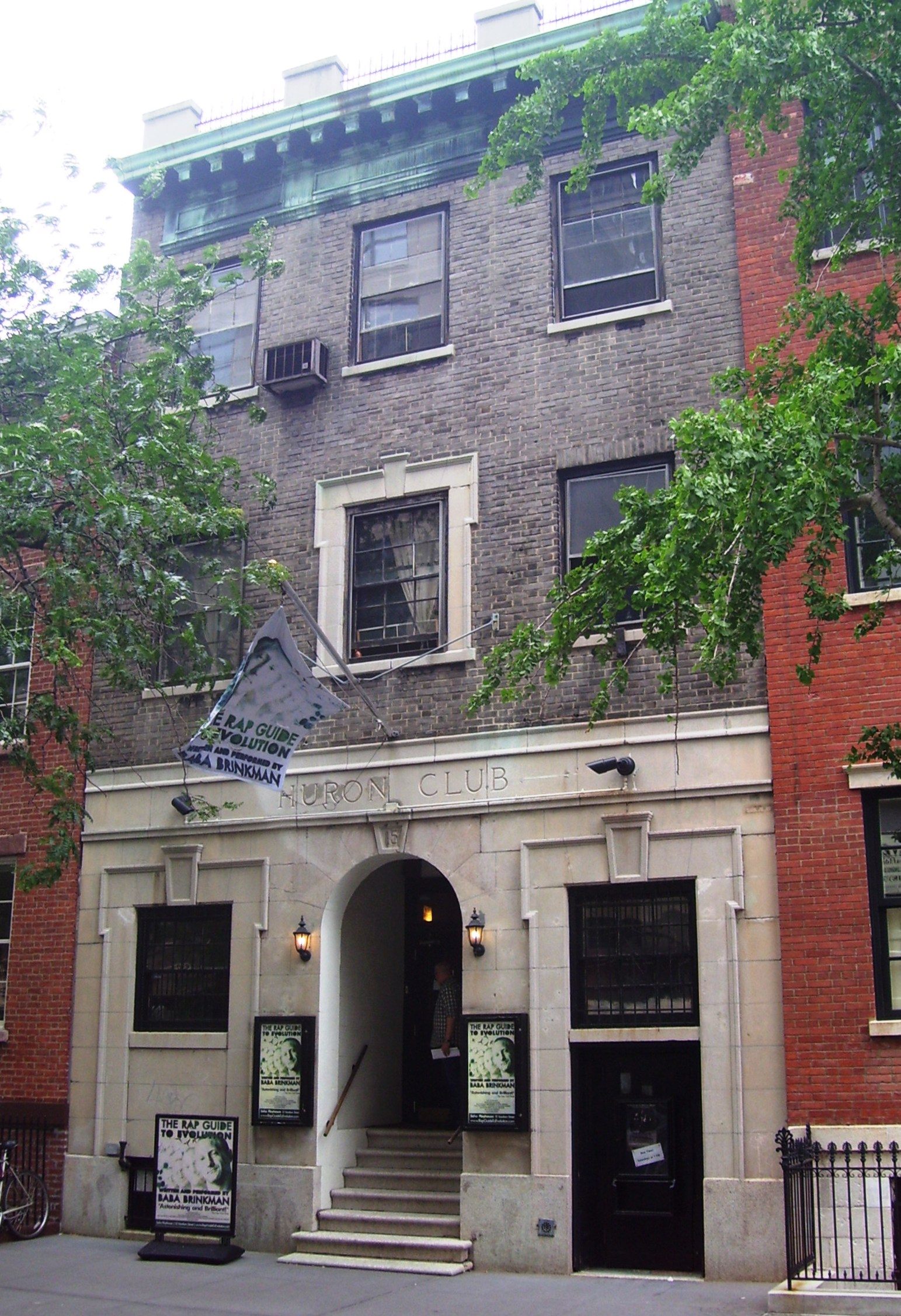
Huron Club, formerly a neighborhood Democratic club

There was no citywide machine. Instead, Democratic machines flourished in each of the boroughs, with Tammany Hall in Manhattan the most prominent. They typically had strong neighborhood organizations, known as "political clubs", as well as one prominent leader often called "the boss". Charles Murphy was the highly effective but quiet boss of Tammany Hall from 1902 to 1924. "Big Tim" Sullivan was the Tammany leader in the Bowery and the machine's spokesman in the state legislature along with Robert F. Wagner and Al Smith. Republican local organizations were much weaker, but they played key roles in forming reform coalitions. Most of the time they looked to Albany and Washington, D.C., for their sphere of influence.

The spirit of the Progressive Era infused New York politics, energizing the reformers with a condemnation of inefficiency, waste, and corruption. An emphasis was placed on expertise and scientific organization of large scale projects. Tammany Hall went along, under the new leadership of Charles Francis Murphy. It promoted a reform image itself, sponsored reformers as mayor, and downplayed overt forms of corruption, graft, and bribery. The Irish remained in control of Tammany, and the leadership had many opportunities for what Alderman George Washington Plunkett called "honest graft" such as an inside track to lucrative construction contracts without any stealing or committing illegal acts.

Three reformers became mayor. Seth Low, the president of Columbia University, united reformers and the Republicans in a fusion ticket that won the mayor's race in 1902. Low lacked the common touch and lost much of his working class support when he listened to Prohibitionists eager to crack down on the liquor business.

Tammany was back in 1904 with a prestigious reformer, George B. McClellan Jr., the son of the famous Civil War general and an experienced politician in his own right. William Jay Gaynor, reform judge, won the Tammany nomination in 1909. Fusion reformer John Purroy Mitchel, a favorite of President Woodrow Wilson, was elected in 1913. Mitchel had strong support from the progressives, enabling him to reorganize the bureaucracy, crackdown on vice, and make taxation more efficient. Mitchel's support for the Allies in the World War alienated Germans, and the working classes were alarmed at his plans for vocational education. He was defeated in 1917 by John Francis Hylan; Hylan was re-elected in 1921 and collaborated closely with Hearst until he was ousted by Al Smith and Tammany in 1925.

Tammany realized it needed reformers on the ticket, but it had a hard time working with them. It needed McClellan to run for re-election in 1905 to beat off the tremendous challenge by independent publisher William Randolph Hearst. But in 1906 Tammany cut a deal and supported Hearst for governor, so McClellan broke with the machine. Gaynor proved much more independent than expected and was denied renomination.

=== Transportation ===
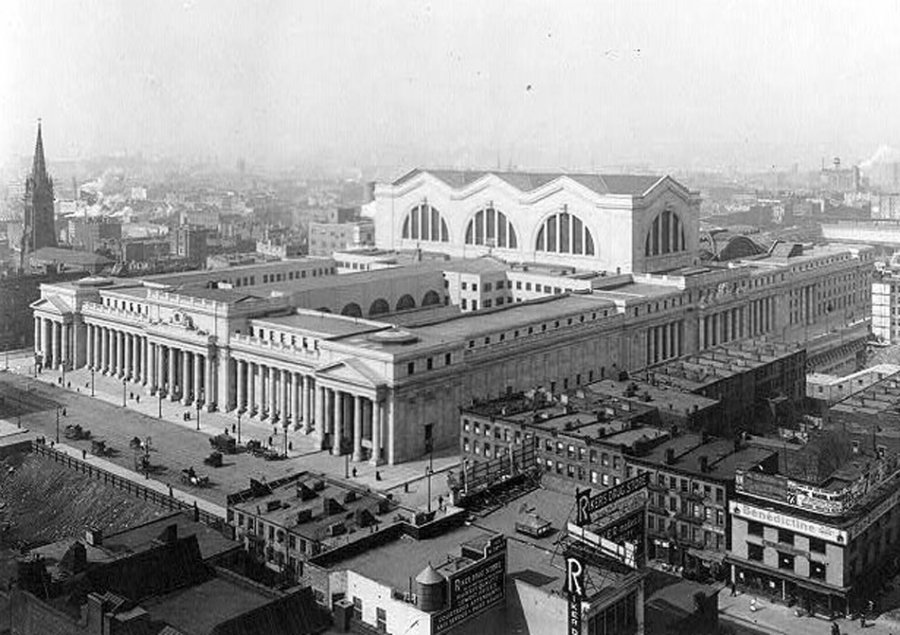
Pennsylvania Station, opened in 1910

The municipal consolidation precipitated greater physical connections between the boroughs. The building of the New York City Subway opened with the first IRT line in 1904. Initially the Interborough Rapid Transit Company (IRT) and Brooklyn-Manhattan Transit Corporation (BMT) systems (with a third system, the Independent Subway System or IND, to be incorporated in 1925) were separate. They immediately became a force for further population spread and development.

The opening of the Williamsburg Bridge in 1903 and the Manhattan Bridge in 1909 further connected Manhattan to the rapidly expanding bedroom community in Brooklyn. The world-famous Grand Central Terminal opened as the world's largest train station on February 1, 1913, replacing an earlier terminal on the site. The Pennsylvania Station, a similarly large and grand railway station several blocks to the west that was torn down in 1963, had opened in 1910.

=== Immigrant life ===
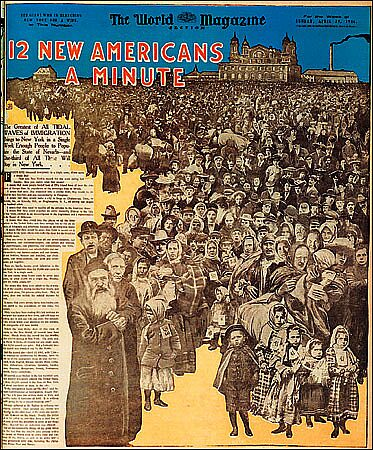
The Sunday magazine of the New York World appealed to immigrants with this April 29, 1906 cover page celebrating their arrival at Ellis Island.

European immigration increased rapidly during the early 20th century and suddenly stopped in 1914 due to World War I and the Emergency Quota Act allowing new residents to assimilate in American life. The new arrivals were Italian and Polish Catholics, as well as Yiddish-speaking Jews from Eastern Europe. There were smaller but steady streams of "Old immigration" sources in Ireland, Britain and Germany. The residents of Little Germany, in what is now the East Village, dispersed to more affluent neighborhoods and were replaced by growing numbers of poor immigrants on the Lower East Side.

==== Jews ====
In 1850 about a third of the 50,000 American Jews lived in New York; they spoke German (not Yiddish), were active in Reform congregations, and took major leadership roles in the city's banking, financial, merchandising, and clothing industries. An entirely different group of 1.4 million poor Yiddish-speaking Jews from Russia and Eastern Europe fled pogroms and anti-Semitism between 1880 and 1914. Over one million lived in New York, where by 1910 they comprised a fourth of the city's population. Many became entrepreneurs setting up small shops; the majority operated sewing machines and worked in the city's many small clothing factories.

Violent confrontations between ethnic groups were strikingly common. Local ethnic gangs controlled their neighborhood turfs and beat up boys who wandered across the line. Each ethnic group had violent youth gangs; Irish gangs were especially aggressive. One serious episode took place in 1902, when the procession of 25,000 to 50,000 Jews marching for the funeral of Jacob Joseph, the chief rabbi of the Orthodox community, passed the Hoe factory. They were attacked by workers or boys throwing debris from the factory windows. The Jews fought back and quickly had the factory and its 1,800 men and boys under siege, breaking all its windows. The (mostly Irish) police broke it up and beat many of the men attacking the factory. They arrested 11 of the Jews and 4 of the factory workers. Jewish oral tradition blamed the anti-Semitism of both the Irish factory workers and the police. However, recent historical research shows that the factory workers were mostly Germans, not Irish, and that the police were following standard practice in quelling a riot. On the whole, the police kept a tight lid on inter-group violence.

=== Education ===
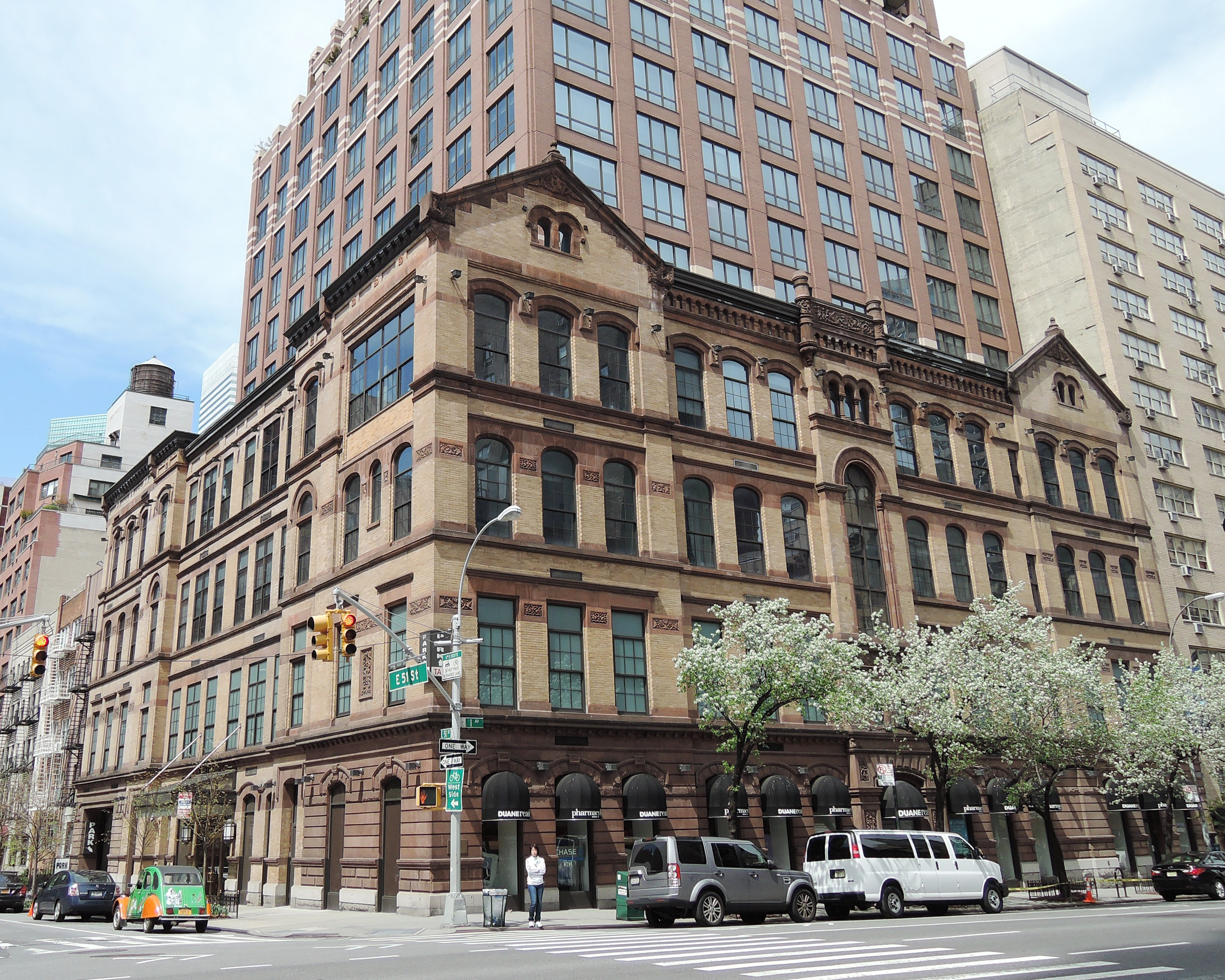
1932 school, Turtle Bay

Progressive Era reformers strongly promoted free public schooling through high school, on the assumption that ignorance was a waste and that learning developed the personality as well as skills needed in a modernizing society. Public school enrollment rose from 553,000 in 1900, to 1.1 million in 1930, and then declined a bit. The wide range of schools included elementary, junior high schools, as well as comprehensive, academic, and technical senior high schools. In addition, the system operated training schools in music the arts, science, cooking, the needle trades, printing, and the like, with special schools for handicapped children and a large evening program for adults. The availability of free public education through high school was especially attractive to poor Jewish immigrants who placed a high value on human capital.

The city's other ethnic groups, most notably the Italians, typically placed a much higher value on home ownership, which required boys and girls to start earning money by age 14 or so. In the Italian community, girls left school as soon as possible to work at home or to take factory jobs. The shift came in the 1930s, as more of them stayed in school, although at only half the rate of Jewish girls. Some historians argue that the Italians were becoming modernized by American culture; their families became less patriarchal and permitted more individualistic careerism for women. Historian Miriam Cohen, however, says that these more modern attitudes were caused by changing opportunities for all young women in New York.

Catholic priests strongly recommended parochial schools at least for elementary students and were rapidly expanding the Catholic high school system, especially for German and Irish youth whose families had been in the city for decades. The Catholic school system grew from an enrollment of 79,000 in 1900, to 286,000 in 1930, peaking at 332,000 in 1960. Upscale private schools also flourished, as well as training schools for adults, such as the Arthur Murray School of Dancing and many music schools. Tens of thousands of adults took correspondence courses through the mail.

Jewish boys and young men thrived in the New York public schools. The problem came with girls attending high school. Jewish men still had doubts about educating girls, and poor families needed the money they could earn in full-time jobs. Those who came to America as young girls picked up English quickly, but the older they were on arrival, the harder the language appeared. Many young Jewish women nevertheless tried, opening their way to clerical and white-collar jobs. Probably most saw their dreams realized in their children rather than themselves.

==== Higher education ====
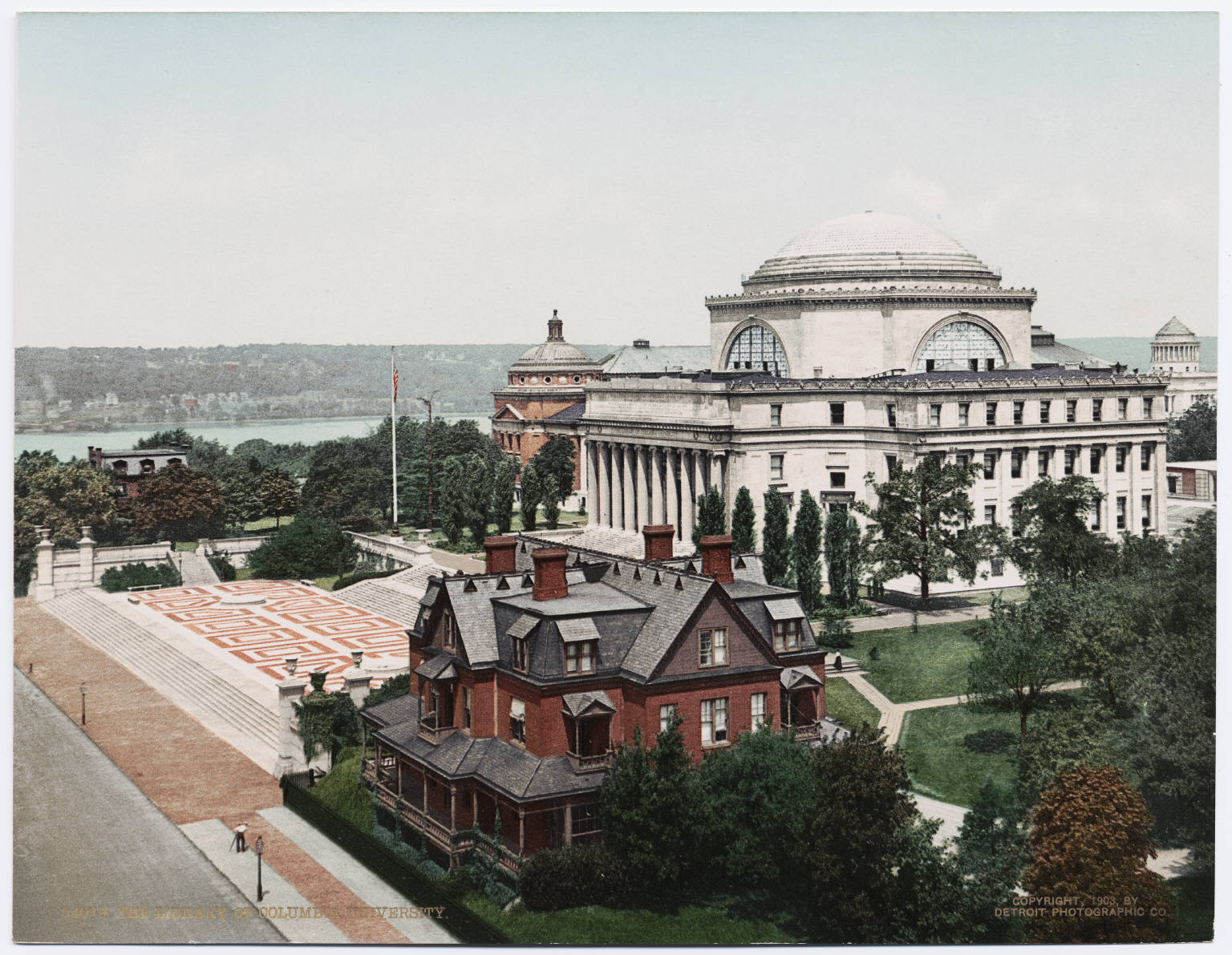
Low Library at Columbia University, ca. 1900

Columbia University developed an international reputation as a major research center in a wide range of the arts, sciences, humanities, and medical fields. New York University in 1890 was still primarily an undergraduate school with a strong Protestant flavor. However it began adding graduate programs, a law school and a medical school, as well as a graduate school of education and a business school. It became one of the nation's largest universities, with an enrollment of 9,300 in 1917 and 40,000 in 1931.

Fordham University took the lead in Catholic higher education, adding a medical school, a law school, a business school, and other units. Its football team had a national reputation. Fordham became coeducational in 1964. In addition there were many smaller specialized schools such as Wagner College (Lutheran), Yeshiva University (Jewish), St. John's University (Catholic), Pratt Institute, Juilliard School of Music, Parsons School of Design, Brooklyn Polytechnic Institute, and The New School for Social Research. There were numerous medical and law schools.

The city's Protestant elites sent their young men to university-preparatory schools in New England and then to Ivy League colleges, and their young women to the Seven Sisters colleges or to finishing schools. After 1900, Columbia had a reputation as heavily academic and was no longer attractive to upper-class young men. Jewish enrollment reached 40% at Columbia College in 1914; a quota system was installed to cut the proportion to 20%. The public universities, City College and Hunter College, were about 80% Jewish.

=== Journalism ===
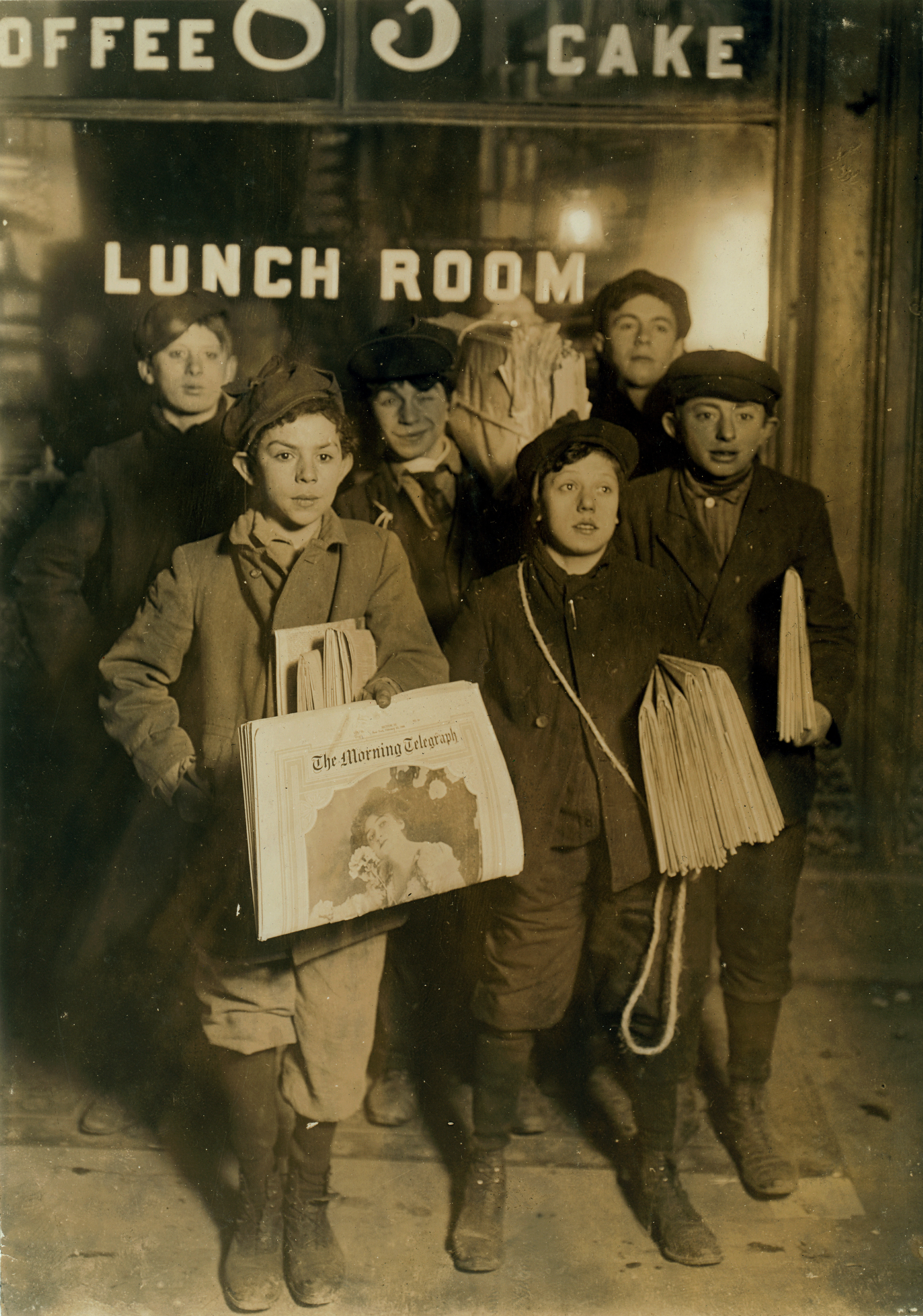
Brooklyn newsboys in 1908. They had won a strike nine years before.

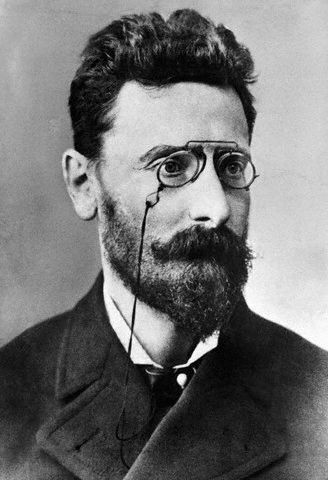
Joseph Pulitzer of the New York World

By the turn of the 20th century, the city had 15 to 20 daily newspapers, and many weeklies. Most newspapers were sold at newsstands or hawked by newsboys, as opposed to subscriptions. The Wall Street Journal provided detailed coverage of business affairs. The New York Times had shrunk to almost nothing by the 1890s. However, after its purchase by Adolph Ochs of Knoxville, Tennessee, in 1896, it reached an upscale audience with unbiased and detailed news. There were numerous ethnic papers. The ethnic papers played a major role in keeping immigrants in touch with the old country. More important, they taught them how to become Americans and understand the complexity of American popular culture.

Starting in 1895, William Randolph Hearst, a mining heir from San Francisco, challenged Joseph Pulitzer, from St. Louis, Missouri, for dominance on the newsstands. Both Hearst's Journal and Pulitzer's World favored the Democrats, and both sought to maximize their sales through yellow journalism with exclusives based on sensationalism, sports, sex and scandal, and features such as comic strips, puzzles, recipes, and advice columns. By 1898, both papers reached the million per day circulation level. Hearst became a leader of the left wing of the Democratic Party and was nearly elected mayor in 1905 and governor in 1906. He had bitter battles with Al Smith over control of the Democratic Party, losing out in 1925. He then moved his headquarters to California.

=== Disasters ===
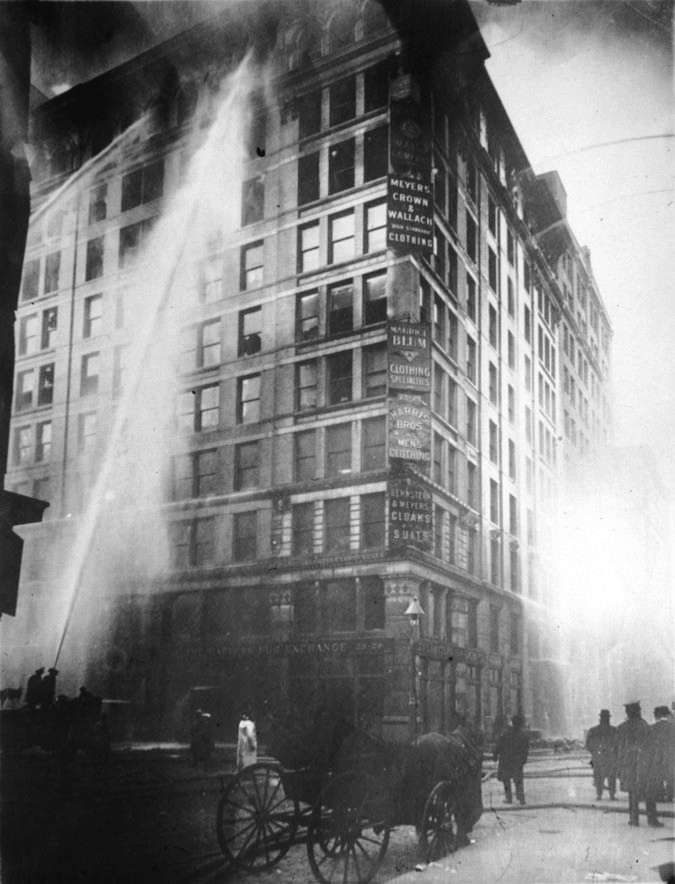
The 1911 Triangle Shirtwaist Factory fire

On June 15, 1904, over 1,000 people were killed when the excursion steamship General Slocum caught fire and burned in the East River. It was a major blow to the German-American community.

On March 25, 1911, the Triangle Shirtwaist Factory fire in Greenwich Village took the lives of 145 mostly Italian and Jewish female garment workers. The stunning event ignited the progressive forces, who greatly improved the city's fire department, building codes, and workplace regulations. Reaction to the disaster spurred the growth of the International Ladies' Garment Workers' Union, and took place in the context of broader union movements coordinated by the American Federation of Labor.

On the night of April 14–15, 1912, the ocean liner RMS Titanic was en route in the North Atlantic to New York when it sank, killing 1,500 of the 2,200 people. On April 18 the rescue ship RMS Carpathia arrived and was met by some 40,000 onlookers. Immediate relief in the form of clothing and transportation to shelters was provided by the Women's Relief Committee, the Travelers Aid Society of New York, and the Council of Jewish Women, among other organizations. Two Titanic memorials are located in Manhattan. On April 13, 1913, the 60 feet (18 m) Titanic Memorial Lighthouse in Lower Manhattan was constructed on the roof of the Seamen's Church Institute. Straus Park, on the Upper West Side, commemorates Isidor Straus and his wife Ida, who both died in the disaster.

The Malbone Street Wreck, the worst disaster in the history of any rapid transit system in the United States, occurred on November 1, 1918. Many unionized subway workers went on strike against the Brooklyn Rapid Transit Company (BRT), so the BRT assigned one of its office workers to be motorman on one train. This particular motorman had almost no training, instead of the usual 20 days minimum of training, and was recovering from the 1918 flu pandemic, which had just killed his daughter. During the rush hour, he made a series of bad mistakes, lost control on a downhill slope, and was racing at high speed when he crashed at a sharp curve outside of Prospect Park station. The Malbone Street Wreck killed 93 of the 650 passengers and seriously injured over hundred more. With a statewide election impending, it became a major campaign episode, leading to the election of Al Smith as governor.

On September 16, 1920, radicals in the city perpetrated the Wall Street bombing, a terrorist attack outside the headquarters of the House of Morgan, killing dozens of people and injuring hundreds. Officials blamed anarchist and communist elements, fueling the ongoing Palmer raids, but the culprits were never caught.

=== Public health and sanitation ===
Cleanliness was a heavily promoted virtue, supported by the middle class and led by the public health community of physicians and experts. Street cleaning became a major item of the city budget and produced the sort of jobs that the machines wanted to distribute to their working class clientele. Horses were used for transportation in 1900, as they had been throughout the history of the city. There were 200,000 of them in the city, producing nearly 2,500 short tons (2,300 t) of manure daily. It accumulated in the streets and was swept to the sides like snow. The stench was so strong that urbanites welcomed motor vehicles as a profound relief.

The city took the lead internationally to combat diphtheria, an often fatal disease that struck thousands of children annually. Researchers applied laboratory-based advances in bacteriology and immunology to the treatment and prevention of this disease, thereby eradicating it as a major threat. A few tens of thousands of people died in the "Spanish flu" epidemic of 1918–1919.

=== Gambling ===
At the turn-of-the-century in 1900, gambling was illegal but widespread in New York City. The favorite activities included games of chance such as cards, dice and numbers, and betting on sports events, chiefly horse racing. In the upper class, gambling was handled discreetly in the expensive private clubs, the most famous of which was operated by Richard Canfield who operated the Saratoga Club. Prominent players included Reggie Vanderbilt and John Bet-a-Million Gates. The chief competitor to Canfield was the "Bronze Door," operated 1891–1917 by syndicate of gamblers closely linked to the Democratic machine represented by Tammany Hall. These elite establishments were illegal, and paid off the police and politicians as needed. The working-class was served by hundreds of neighborhood gambling parlors, featuring faro card games, and the omnipresent policy shops where poor folks could bet a few pennies on the daily numbers, and be quickly paid off so they could gamble again. Betting on horse racing was allowed only at the tracks themselves, where the controls were tight. The most famous racing venue was Belmont Park, a complex of five race courses, a 12,000 seat grandstand and multiple stables, centered around a lavish clubhouse. Middle-class gamblers could frequent the city's race tracks, but the center of middle-class moral gravity was strongly opposed to all forms of gambling. The reform movement was strongest in the 1890s. It was led by men such as the Reverend Charles H. Parkhurst, the leading Presbyterian pastor and president of the New York Society for the Prevention of Crime; reform mayor William L. Strong, and his police commissioner Theodore Roosevelt. Reformers passed laws in the state legislature against any emerging gambling venue. Such laws were enforced in most of the small towns and rural areas, but not in New York's larger cities, where political machines controlled the police and the courts.

== 1920s to 1940 ==
=== Politics ===
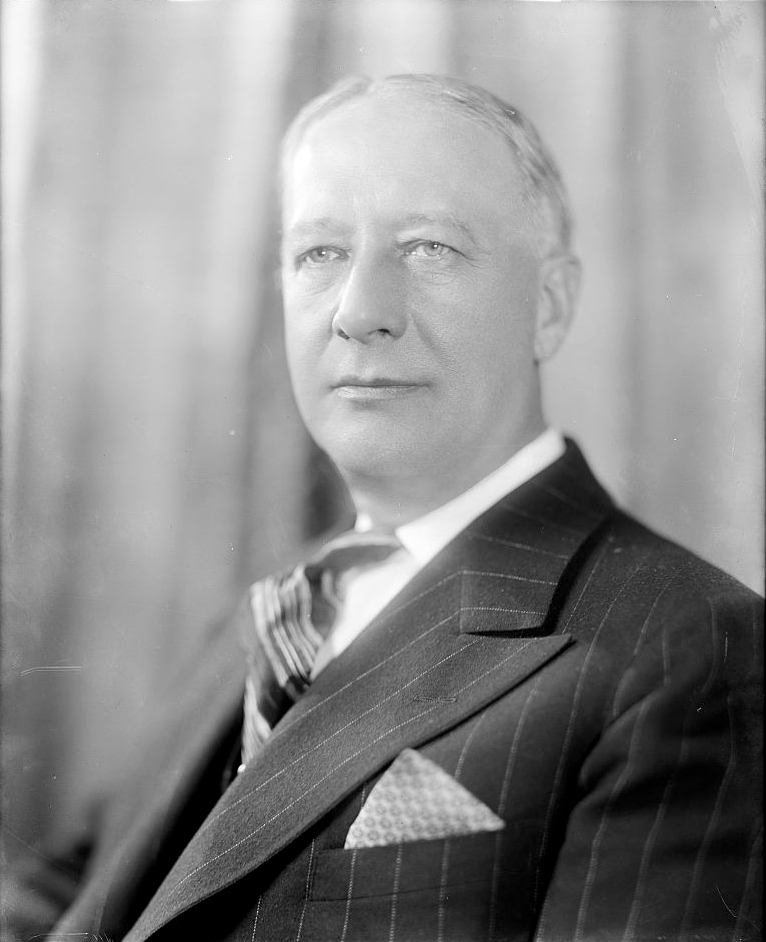
Al Smith, leader of the Democrats in the 1910s and 1920s

The Democrats, under the leadership of Al Smith and Robert F. Wagner embraced reform in the 1910s and 1920s, especially to the benefit of their core constituency, the working class. Smith became governor in the 1920s but lost the 1928 United States presidential election, though he did very well in Catholic strongholds. Smith won New York City. Wagner served in the United States Senate from 1927 to 1949, where he was a leader of the New Deal Coalition, paying special emphasis to supporting the labor movement.

The 1924 presidential election, in which most New Yorkers voted for Calvin Coolidge, was the last time New York City was carried by a Republican presidential candidate.

After 1928, scandal engulfed City Hall. Flamboyant Mayor Jimmy Walker, a Tammany Democrat, resigned and fled to Europe after state investigations showed he had taken bribes. Coupled with the harshness of the Great Depression, this gave an opening to the reformers. They won in 1933 with a Fusion ticket headed by Fiorello La Guardia. He was a liberal Republican Congressman with strong Italian and Jewish connections who appealed across party lines. La Guardia dominated city politics as mayor, 1934 to 1945. He supported President Franklin D. Roosevelt and his New Deal; in turn Roosevelt heavily funded the city and cut off patronage for La Guardia's enemies. La Guardia revitalized New York and restored public faith in City Hall. With the help of Robert Moses he directed the building of low-cost public housing, public playgrounds, parks, and airports. He reorganized the police force, defeated the still-powerful Tammany Hall machine, and reestablished the merit system in place of patronage jobs. La Guardia was a domineering leader who verged on authoritarianism but whose reform politics were carefully tailored to address the sentiments of his diverse constituency. He defeated a corrupt Democratic machine, presided during the Depression and world war, made the city the model for New Deal welfare and public works programs, and championed immigrants and ethnic minorities. He succeeded with the support of a sympathetic president who was equally hostile to Tammany Hall. He secured his place in history as a tough-minded reform mayor who helped clean out corruption, bring in gifted experts, and fix upon the city a broad sense of responsibility for its own citizens. His administration engaged new groups that had been kept out of the political system, gave New York its modern infrastructure, and raised expectations of new levels of urban possibility.

=== Ethnics come of age ===
Immigrant families continued establishing themselves, and more started moving into the neighborhoods outside of Manhattan; in a sign of municipal maturation, the 1920 census showed Brooklyn for the first time overtaking Manhattan as the most populous borough. But the great period of European immigration which had only just passed its peak was halted abruptly by the Immigration Act of 1924 which severely limited further immigrants from Southern and Eastern Europe.

=== Harlem Renaissance ===
After 1890, black people started moving into the formerly Jewish neighborhood of Harlem on Manhattan's Upper Westside. Much larger numbers arrived during the era of World War I as the Great Migration brought in blacks to fill more jobs at a time when immigration was suspended. Harlem became the political capital of black America, with highly controversial leadership from Marcus Garvey in the early 1920s. Sustained civil rights activism took place in the 1930s and 1940s, often led by Baptists minister Adam Clayton Powell Jr., who was elected to the United States Congress in 1942. Unemployment was a major problem in the Depression years, but New Deal relief agencies such as the Civilian Conservation Corps and Works Progress Administration provided considerable employment on an equal basis. Much of the organized protest was a demand for jobs and stores owned and operated by whites in Harlem.

The Harlem Renaissance from 1920 to 1940 brought worldwide attention to African American literature. For many years, especially in the 1920s, Harlem was home to a flourishing of social thought and culture that took place among numerous Black artists, musicians, novelists, poets, and playwrights. The most famous writers included Langston Hughes, James Weldon Johnson, Claude McKay, and Zora Neale Hurston.

==== Jazz Age ====
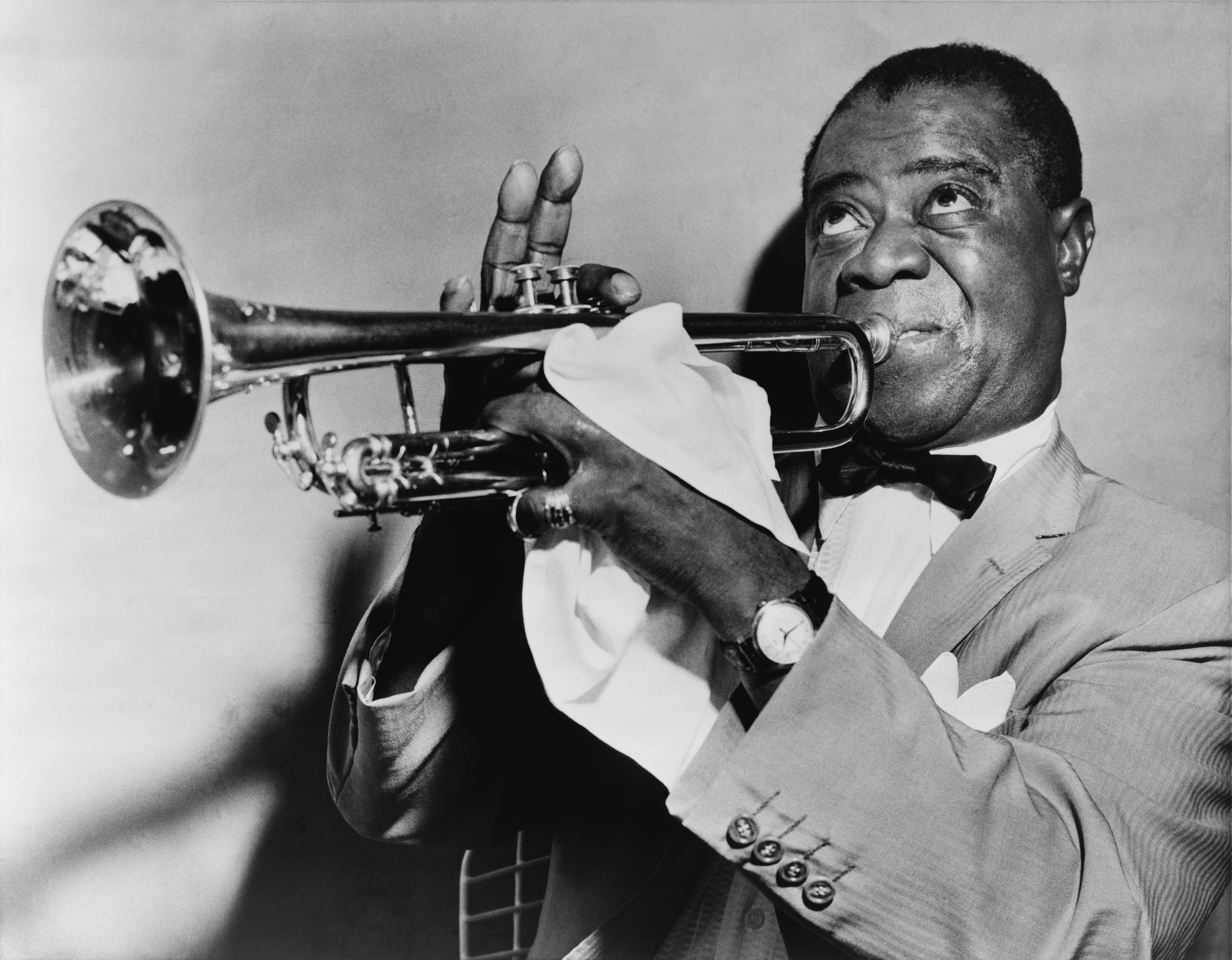
Louis Armstrong

The Jazz Age featured celebrities, among the most notable in the city were Madame Polly Adler; jazz singer Ella Fitzgerald; dancer Martha Graham; speakeasy host Texas Guinan; publisher Henry Luce of Time magazine; writer Dorothy Parker and the pundits at the Algonquin Hotel; editor Harold Ross at The New Yorker magazine; and such nationally famous sports heroes as Babe Ruth and Bill Tilden.

Fun-loving Tammany Mayor Jimmy Walker presided over a period of prosperity for the city, with the proliferation of the speakeasy during Prohibition.

Tin Pan Alley developed toward Broadway, and the first modern musical, Jerome Kern's Show Boat, opened in 1927, as the theater district moved north of 42nd Street.

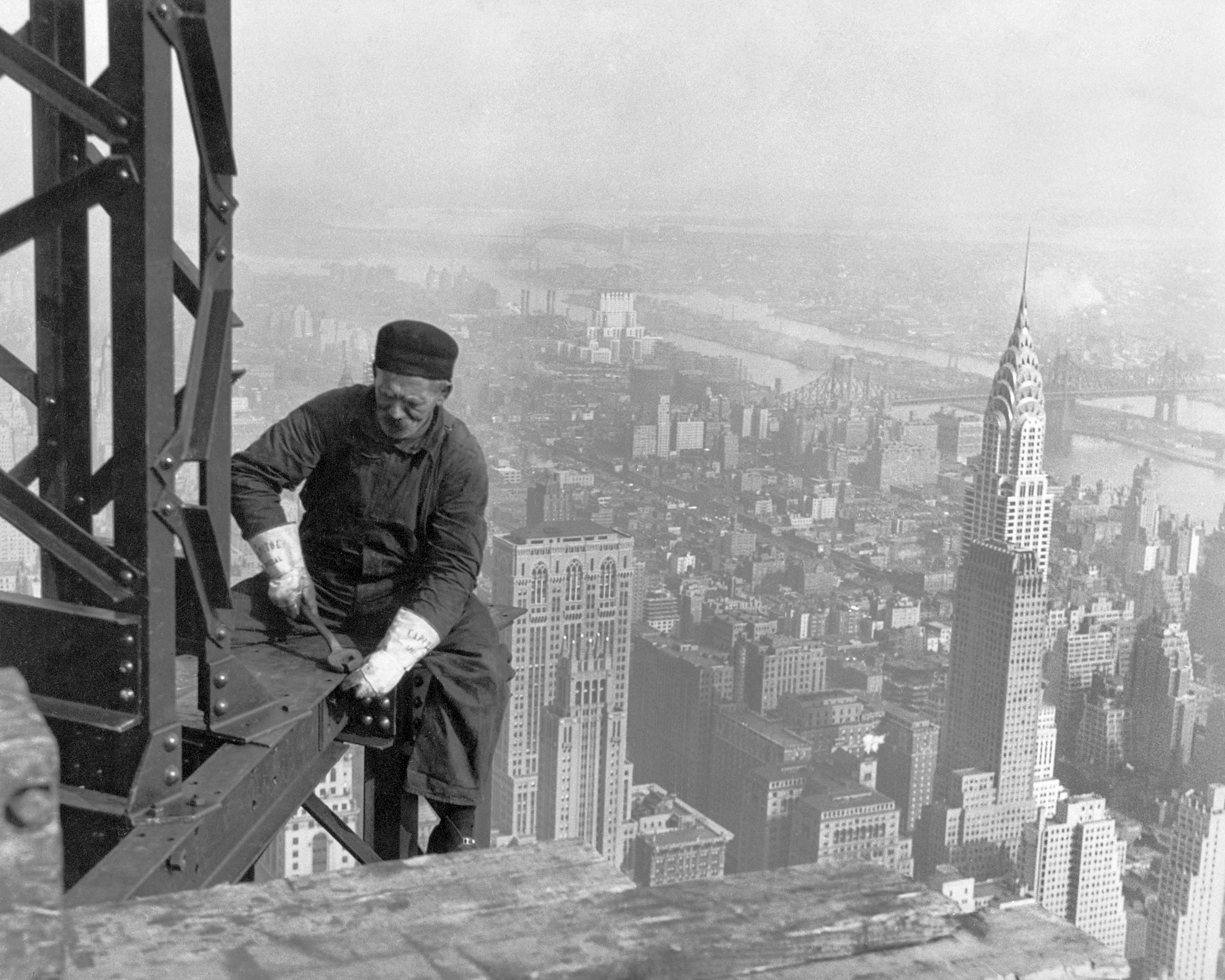
A workman helps raise the Empire State Building 25 floors higher than the Chrysler Building (at right), as seen in 1931.

During this time, New York City became known for its daring and impressive architecture, including notably the skyscrapers which transformed the skyline. The race to the sky culminated in the dueling spires of two Art Deco icons—the Chrysler Building and the Empire State Building—during the late 1920s. These two skyscrapers were not topped off until their soaring heights seemed rather overoptimistic. The construction of the Rockefeller Center also occurred during this time, becoming one of the largest-ever private development projects at the time. The city grew outward, too, with residential development replacing most of the farmland of eastern Brooklyn, eastern Bronx, and much of Queens.

=== Great Depression ===
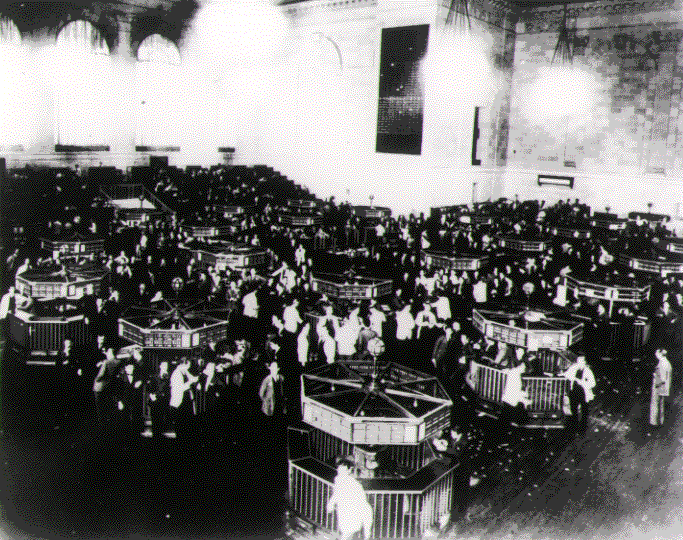
Stock Market Crash

The Great Depression, which was to affect the rest of the world, began with the Stock Market Crash of 1929. The recently completed Empire State Building would be known as the "Empty State Building" for many years because it could not attract sufficient tenants in the bleak business climate. When New York Governor Franklin Roosevelt became president, the Hooverville shacks named after his predecessor dotted city parks. The city became a showcase for New Deal spending, especially through the Public Works Administration and the Works Progress Administration. There were massive building projects including highways, bridges, public housing, new schools, and expansion of the Brooklyn Navy Yard.

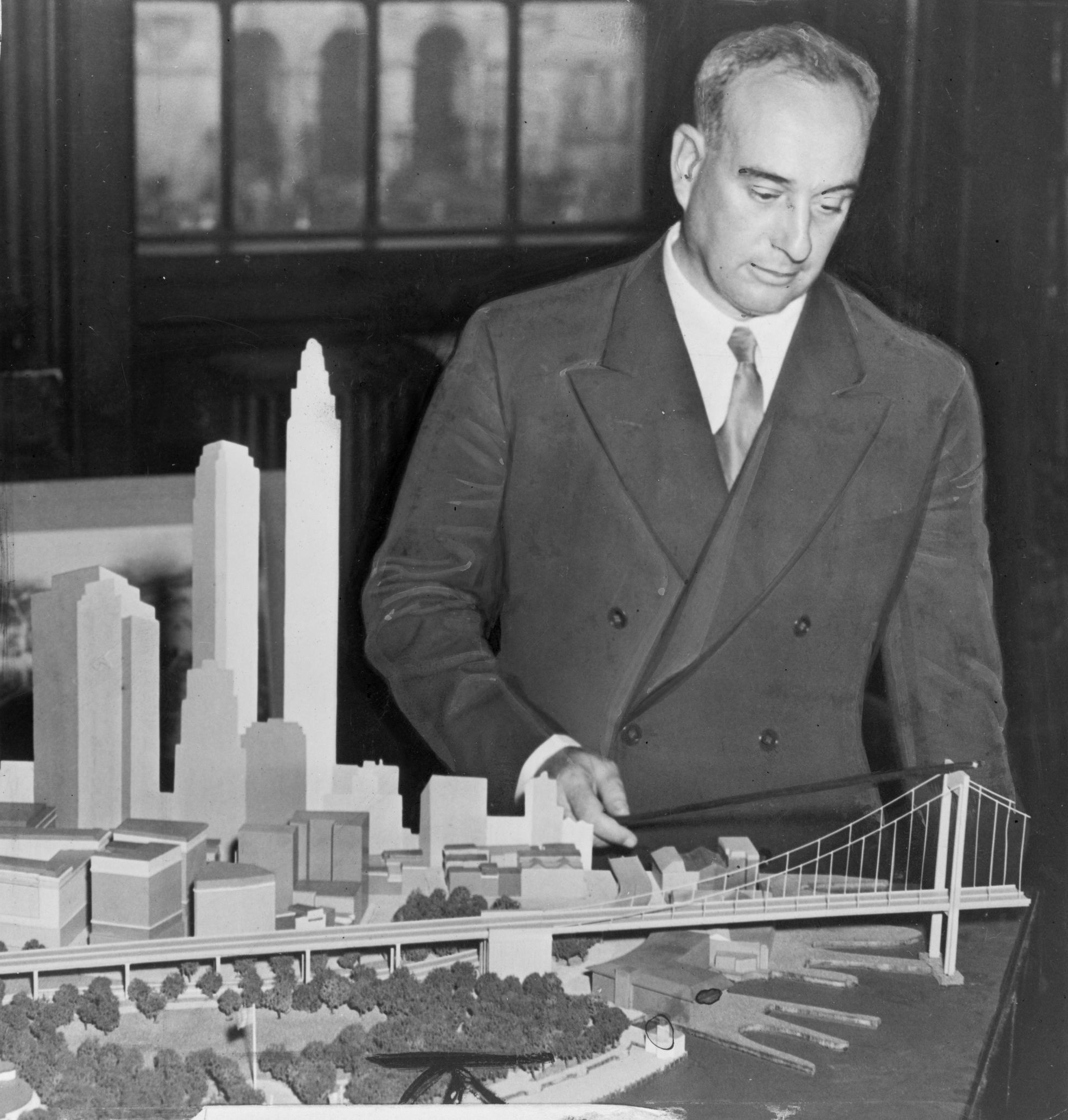
Robert Moses with a model of his proposed Battery Bridge, never built

Parkway planner Robert Moses took charge of building many bridges, parks, public housing units, and parkways with mainly federal money. Moses was a great proponent of automobile-centered modernism whose legacy of massive construction projects is still controversial. He opposed the massive subway expansions proposed in 1929 and 1939. However, the last large expansion of the subway system, combined with the merger of privately owned Interborough Rapid Transit and Brooklyn–Manhattan Transit subway companies with the city-owned Independent Subway System under city ownership, made the subway largely what it is today.

Meanwhile Samuel Seabury led an investigation by the Hofstadter Committee into the dominance held by the Tammany Hall faction, in 1932. A few years later he was successful in having NYC adopt a form of proportional representation to ensure minority representation and majority rule.

In 1938, the city experienced a citywide truckers strike, most notably hampering port shipping and general foodstuffs. Mayor La Guardia declared a public emergency near its end, deploying 1,000 sanitation trucks for city supplies. In part due to the city being hit by the 1938 New England hurricane.

== World War II ==
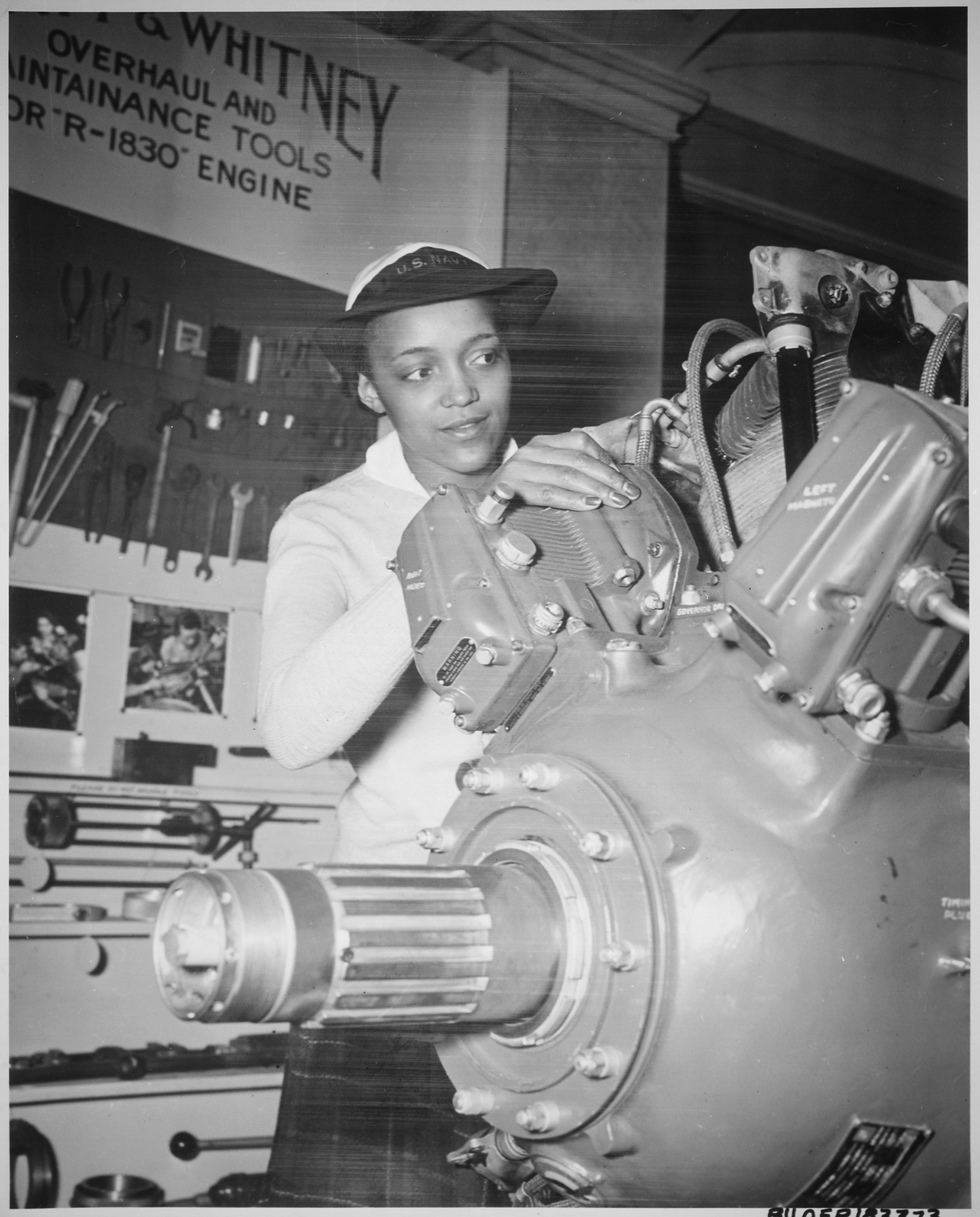
Aircraft engine at Naval Training School in the Bronx

New York, long a great American city with many immigrants, became a culturally international city with the brain drain of intellectual, musical, and artistic European refugees that started in the late 1930s. The 1939 New York World's Fair, marking the 150th anniversary of George Washington's inauguration in Federal Hall, was a high point of technological optimism, meant to mark the end of the Depression. After the start of World War II, though, the theme was changed from "Building the World of Tomorrow" to "For Peace and Freedom", and the shadow of the war underway in Europe dampened the proceedings.

The war transformed New York into a hub of the United States home front during World War II. Over 900,000 New Yorkers served in the war and approximately 63 million tons of supplies and more than 3 million men shipped out from New York Harbor. During the height of the war, a ship left every 15 minutes. Efforts were made to protect New York from attack, during the war famous landmarks such as Times Square and Broadway were dimmed out to protect New York from an air raid. Posters were put up across all public spaces in New York to instruct civilians on how to respond to an air raid or naval strike.

New York was infiltrated by Axis forces during the war. On the evening of 14 January 1942, U-123 entered Lower New York Bay and its crew observed the New York skyline. In his memoirs, the then U-boat Captain, Reinhard Hardegen, described the moment he first laid eyes on the New York skyline aboard U-123:

"I cannot describe the feeling with words, but it was unbelievably beautiful and great...I would have given away a kingdom for this moment if I had one. We were the first to be here, and for the first time in this war a German soldier looked upon the coast of the U.S.A."

While U-boats menaced from without, elements of the Nazi Duquesne Spy Ring and Operation Pastorius operated within the city.

The economy of New York City was boosted by the war effort, but not to the extent of cities with heavy industries such as Pittsburgh, Chicago, Los Angeles or Detroit. The clothing industry produced uniforms, and machine shops focused on war materials. The Sperry Corporation prospered, producing bombsights and other aviation equipment in Brooklyn. The Brooklyn Navy Yard again increased its production of warships. The large printing industry was scarcely affected. The port facilities again played their role in shipping supplies and soldiers to Europe. The Port of New York handled 25% of the nation's exports. By the war's end, the Navy Yard was the world's largest shipyard with 75,000 workers. When peace arrived in 1945, New York was clearly pre-eminent in the world, as the only major world city unscathed by the war.

== Economy ==
=== Finance ===
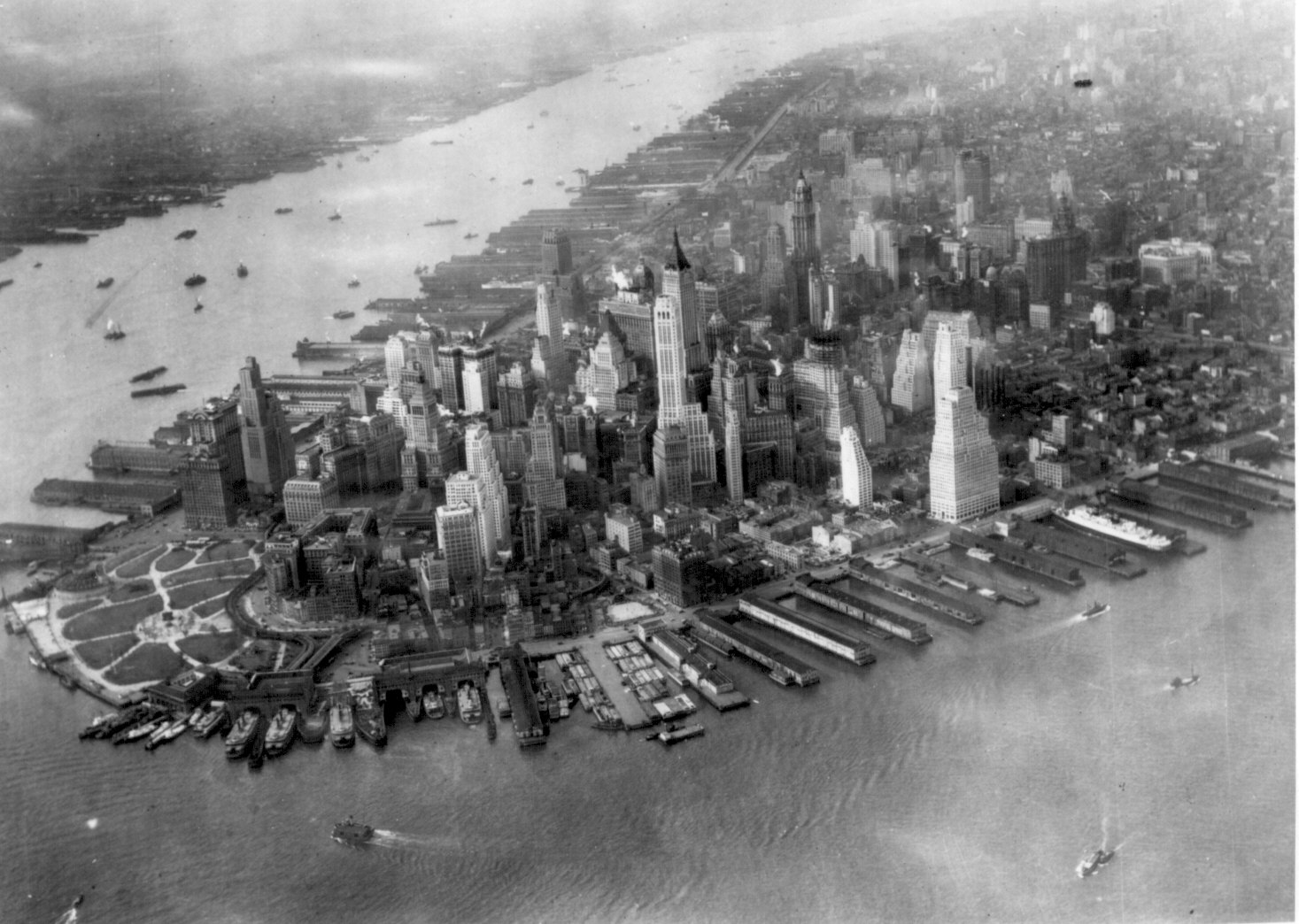
Lower Manhattan in 1931. The American International Building, which would become lower Manhattan's tallest building in 1932, is only partially completed.

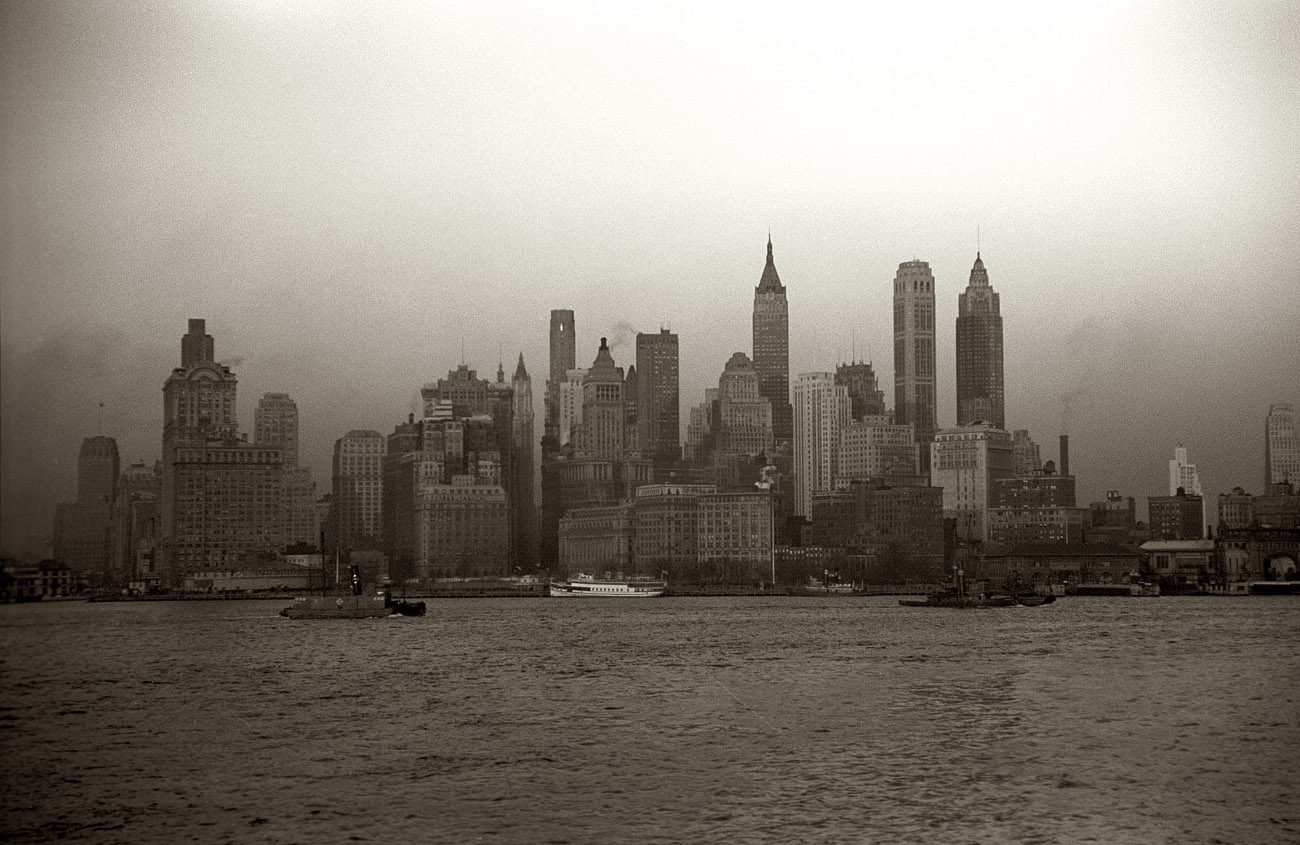
Lower Manhattan, as seen from a ferry, December 1941

Poster about air service, in 1937

New York became the financial center of the United States before the Civil War, specializing in railroad securities. By 1900 it grew even more dominant and was starting to approach London as a world financial center. There were thousands of successful bankers and financiers; a central figure was J.P. Morgan, whose House of Morgan set up national financing programs for the steel, agricultural implements, shipping, and other industries. It also financed much of the British and French war efforts in World War I. John D. Rockefeller, of Standard Oil, expanded from a dominant position in oil to other industries as well as banking. Andrew Carnegie dominated steel until he sold out to Morgan in 1901. After 1900, Rockefeller and Carnegie largely devoted their interest to philanthropy, as to a certain extent did Morgan. With the creation of the Federal Reserve System in 1913, the Federal Reserve Bank of New York became a powerful player under its dynamic president Benjamin Strong. By 1917, New York was funding the world war efforts of Britain, France and for other Allies. By the 1920s, New York had surpassed London as a world banking center. The New York Stock Exchange was the national focus of wealth making and speculation until its shares suddenly collapsed late in 1929, setting off the worldwide Great Depression.

=== Garment industry ===
The garment industry involved the manufacture of ready-to-wear clothing for men and women, as well as the wholesaling of these products to stores around the country. New York City dominated the national industry, with Chicago and Los Angeles trailing far behind. It originated in the nineteenth-century "rag trade" of Jewish tailors, cutters, pressers, peddlers, and shopkeepers. By 1900 it was a largely Jewish owned and operated industry, and most workers were Jewish, although other new immigrants were being hired. The Yiddish-speaking East European Jews were strong supporters of labor unions, which they related to their socialist influences back in Europe.

The International Ladies Garment Workers Union (ILGWU) formed in 1900 and was a major player in the American Federation of Labor. It grew rapidly in its first two decades and took credit for abolishing sewing work in the tenements, establishing a six-day, 54-hour week, writing union contracts that gave preference to ILGWU members applying for a job, and setting up arbitration machinery. The union was much larger and stronger than the hundreds of small shops with which it dealt. However, in the 1920s the ILGWU was torn by battles between the established leadership and communists within the party. By 1928 the establishment won out; Communist members of the AFL only remained in positions of power within the Furriers union. ILGWU membership had dropped to 40,000 (the great majority of whom were women). The early years of the Great Depression further undermined the union. Under the leadership of David Dubinsky, the ILGWU became a major supporter of Roosevelt's New Deal, and it grew rapidly in membership in the late 1930s and during World War II.

The Amalgamated Clothing Workers of America was a more radical breakaway group that formed in 1914. It focused on ready-made clothing for men, and provided banks, recreation, medical care, and even restaurants and housing for the membership. It expelled its communist members in the 1920s. Under the leadership of Sidney Hillman, it played a central role in forming the militant Congress of Industrial Organizations in the mid-1930s, and giving Hillman a powerful voice in the New Deal Coalition. After 1970, both unions lost membership and merged in 1995.

With the Democratic Party in the city largely controlled by the conservative Irish, Dubinsky and Hillman and their unions formed a new political party in 1936, the American Labor Party. It ran a ticket only in New York State, where it enthusiastically endorsed Roosevelt's three re-elections. In 1944 a split formed between communist members and the establishment leadership within the party, principally David Dubinsky. David Dubinsky and his allies broke away creating the Liberal Party of New York. The Liberal party was led for many years by Alex Rose, the leader of the hatter's union, a small garment industry union.

=== On the waterfront ===
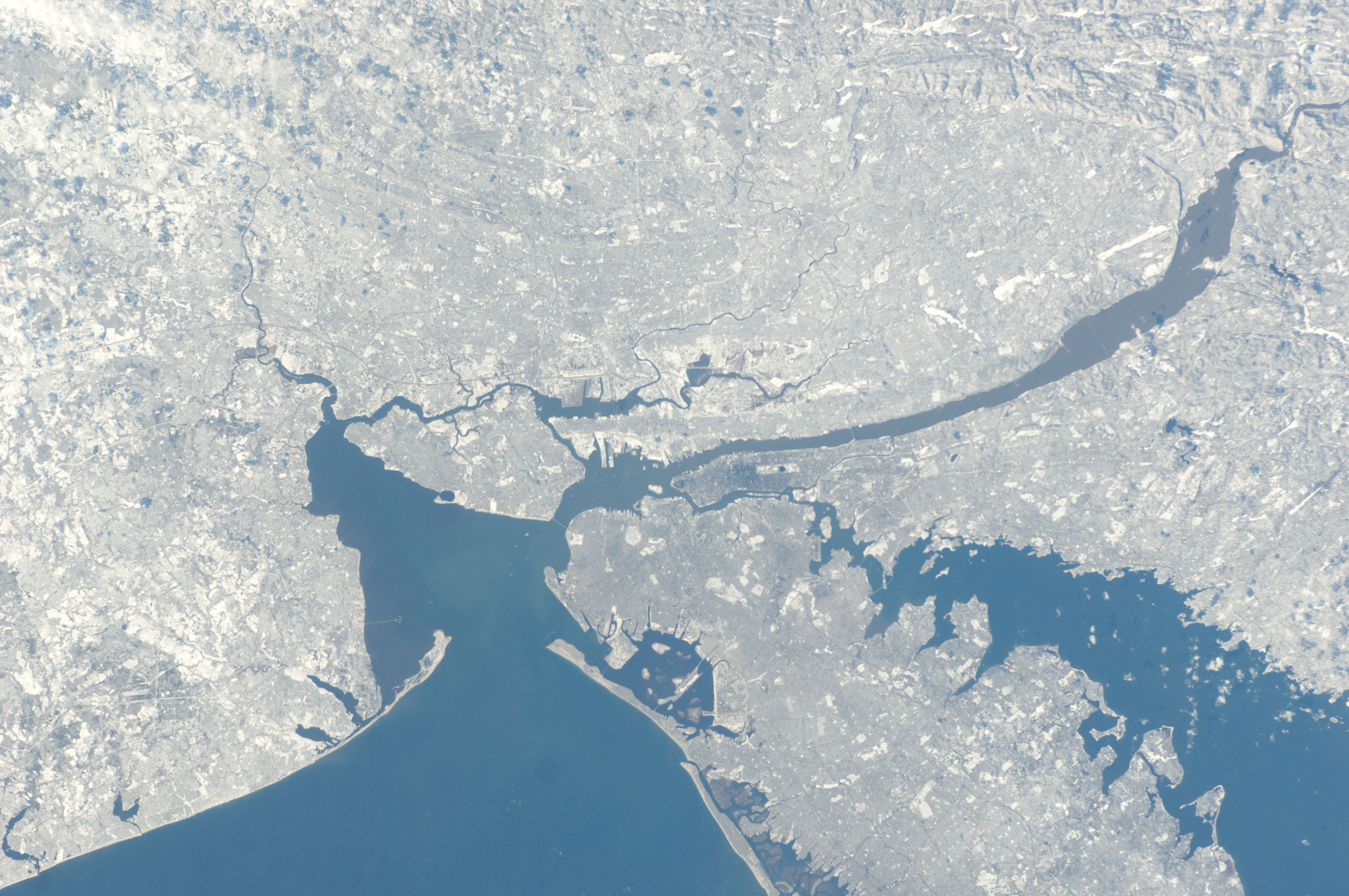
NASA image of the Port of New York and New Jersey

The Port of New York and New Jersey was the largest American port by far, serving both passenger and merchant vessels. The port was the main point of embarkation for U.S. troops traveling to Europe during World War I.

The congestion at the port led experts to suggest a port authority to supervise the extremely complex system of bridges, highways, subways, and port facilities in the New York-New Jersey area.

After the war, the 1919 New York City Harbor Strike by the Marine Workers Union shut down the port for weeks. It started on January 9 and paused on January 13 for arbitration. The strike resumed March 4 after workers rejected the War Board labor ruling and ended on April 20, 1919; After new terms had been offered by both public and private port employers.

The Port of New York Authority was created in 1921, under the supervision of the governors of New York and New Jersey. By issuing its own bonds, it was financially independent of either state; the bonds were paid off from tolls and fees, and not from taxes. It became one of the major agencies of the New York metropolitan area to handle large-scale projects, especially under the leadership of Austin Tobin.

Passenger ships flourished before the coming of transatlantic air carriers in the 1960s. One line of business catered to upscale tourists headed in both directions, with American and British lines in competition. Passenger steamships also carried steerage passengers at low rates. The vast majority were immigrants to the United States, although some immigrants were returning to Europe. Two German companies dominated the immigration traffic to New York from Central and Eastern Europe, the Hamburg-America line and the North German Lloyd. They built elaborate networks of ticket agencies in Europe, offering low-cost one-way packages. Immigrants headed to other cities typically held prepaid tickets paid by their relatives who had already established themselves in the New World. Most new arrivals already had some idea of what they were coming to, from family letters and widely available pamphlet literature. The great majority of travelers from Europe came through New York City, and the immigrants did their paperwork at Ellis Island. A small percentage were rejected because of obvious disease; the steamship companies had to pay their fare back, so they screened for sick passengers ahead of time in Europe.

=== World War I ===
The city played a major role in publicizing and financing World War I, as well as producing uniforms and warships. There was fear of German sabotage, especially in the aftermath of the Black Tom explosion in 1916.

== The Bronx ==
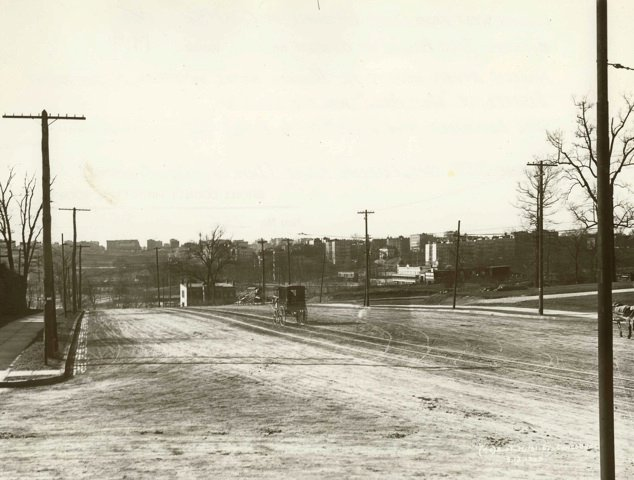
The Grand Concourse and 161st Street at the beginning of the 20th century.

The Bronx's history after 1898 falls into several distinct periods. The first is a boom period during 1898–1929, with a population growth by a factor of six from 200,000 in 1900 to 1.3 million in 1930. The Great Depression brought a surge of unemployment, especially among the working class, and a slowing of growth. The mid-to-late century were hard times, as the Bronx declined in the 1950s through the '70s from a predominantly moderate-income to a predominantly lower-income area with high rates of violent crime and poverty. An economic and developmental resurgence began in the late 1980s and continued through the 1990s.

Politics in the borough from 1922 to 1953 was under the tight control of the Democratic organization, with Edward J. Flynn at the helm. Generally referred to as "the boss", he ran the political machine like a business executive, paying particular attention to choosing top lieutenants, and providing services to grateful voters. In sharp contrast to the leaders of Tammany, he cooperated very smoothly with Franklin Roosevelt both as governor and as president.

== See also ==
- American urban history
- Timeline of New York City
- 1917 New York City mayoral election
- 1921 New York City mayoral election
- 1925 New York City mayoral election
- 1929 New York City mayoral election
- 1933 New York City mayoral election
- 1937 New York City mayoral election
- 1941 New York City mayoral election
- 1945 New York City mayoral election

Preceded by History of New York City (1855–1897)	History of New York City (1898–1945)	Succeeded by History of New York City (1946–1977)
