= Orin Clarkson Baker =

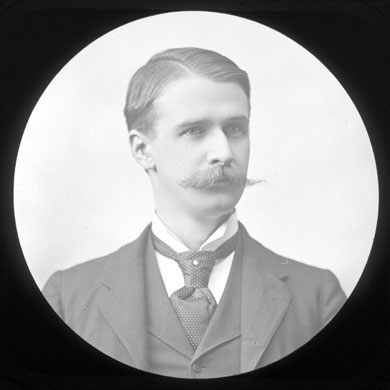
Early photograph of Baker from his days in Xenia, Ohio

Orin Clarkson Baker (1864, Ohio - 1957, Miami, Florida) was General Secretary of the Travelers Aid Society of New York (TAS-NY) from 1911 to 1917. The TAS-NY was formed by Grace Hoadley Dodge in 1907 to protect native-born and immigrant women from the moral dangers, especially "white slavery", that were thought to be rampant at urban train stations and piers. Upon Dodge's death in 1914, Orin Baker became the face of the Travelers Aid movement in New York and the United States. He criss-crossed the country to promote travelers' aid as a legitimate subfield of the emerging social work profession. While in California, he helped establish the Travelers Aid Society of California for the purpose of providing travelers' aid to the female visitors of the 1915 Panama–Pacific International Exposition. Under his leadership, local Travelers Aid Societies and similar organizations were federated to form the National Travelers Aid Society in 1917. That same year he published the first travelers' aid textbook, Travelers Aid Society in America. Baker abruptly resigned from both the Travelers Aid Society of New York and the National Travelers Aid Association in 1919 when he thought board members were attempting to undermine his authority within the movement.

Travelers Aid Society of California Badge, 1915

Baker was from Ohio where he had been the longtime Financial Officer of the Ohio Soldiers' and Sailors' Orphans' Home. He came to New York City with his wife Alice sometime after 1903. In New York, before leading the Travelers Aid Society, he was known for delivering a series of lectures on “personal evangelistic work” and for leading a bible class for men at the West End Presbyterian Church. He had also served, since 1905, as the Assistant Superintendent of the Evangelistic Committee, primarily handling its business affairs.
