= History of New York City (1946–1977) =

Immediately after World War II, New York City became known as one of the world's greatest cities. However, after peaking in population in 1950, the city began to feel the effects of suburbanization brought about by new housing communities such as Levittown, a downturn in industry and commerce as businesses left for places where it was cheaper and easier to operate, an increase in crime, and an upturn in its welfare burden, all of which reached a nadir in the city's fiscal crisis of the 1970s, when it barely avoided defaulting on its obligations and declaring bankruptcy.

== Postwar: Late 1940s through 1950s ==
As many great cities lay in ruins after World War II, New York City assumed a new global prominence. It became the home of the United Nations headquarters, built 1947–1952; inherited the role from Paris as center of the art world with abstract expressionism; and became a rival to London in the international finance and art markets. Yet the population declined after 1950, with increasing suburbanization in the New York metropolitan area as pioneered in Levittown, New York.

Midtown Manhattan, fueled by postwar prosperity, was experiencing an unprecedented building boom that changed its very appearance. Glass-and-steel office towers in the new International Style began to replace the ziggurat-style towers (built in wedding-cake style) of the prewar era. Also rapidly changing was the eastern edge of the East Village close to FDR Drive. Many traditional apartment blocks were cleared and replaced with large-scale public housing projects. In Lower Manhattan, urban renewal began to take shape around 1960, led by David Rockefeller's construction of the One Chase Manhattan Plaza building.

In a built-out city, construction entails destruction. After the old Beaux Arts Pennsylvania Station was torn down, growing concern for preservation led to the 1965 Landmarks Preservation Commission Law. The city's other great train station, Grand Central, was also threatened with demolition but was eventually saved. Meanwhile, New York City's network of highways spread, destroying neighborhoods where African Americans lived under the guidance of the noted urban planner with exceeding biases against certain ethnicities Robert Moses, consequently increasing traffic congestion, traffic pollution, and ruining livelihoods of the people who once lived in vibrant neighborhoods. However, the defeat in 1962 of Moses' planned Lower Manhattan Expressway by community activists led by Jane Jacobs was an indication that Moses would no longer have the free hand in the destruction of livelihoods he had enjoyed in the past.

== 1960s ==
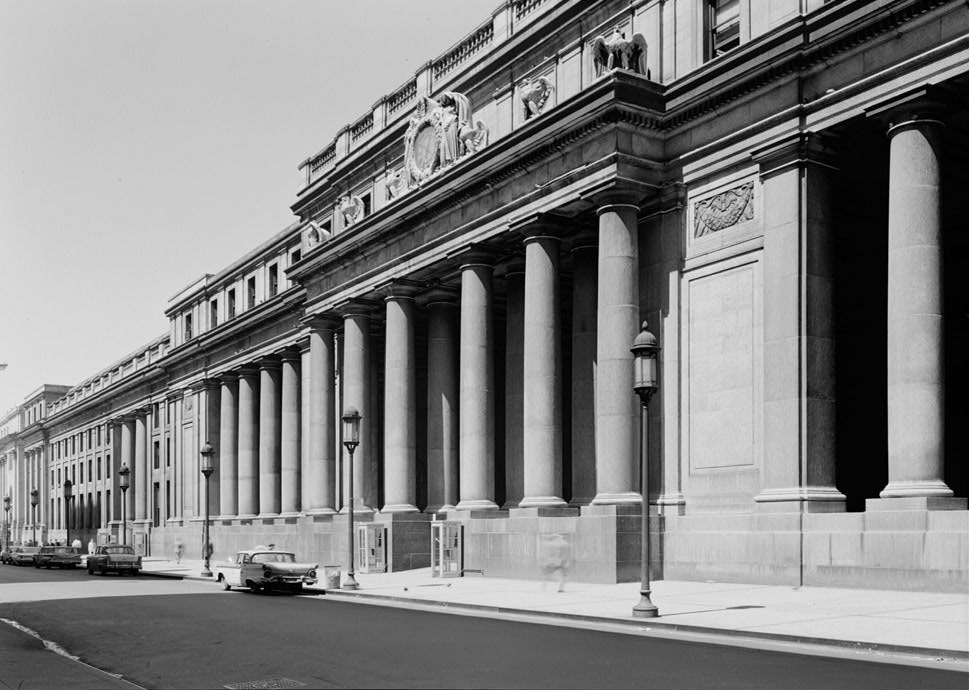
Pennsylvania Station in 1962, two years before it was torn down, an event which jump-started the historic preservation movement.

During the 1960s, a gradual economic and social decay set in. During the days following Christmas of 1960, A Trans World Airlines Lockheed Constellation collided with a United Airlines DC-8, resulting in the deaths of 134 people. A symptom of the city's waning competitiveness was the loss of both its longtime resident National League baseball teams to booming California; the Dodgers and the Giants both moved after the 1957 season. A sports void was partially filled with the formation of the Mets in 1962, who played their first two seasons at the Polo Grounds, the former home of the Giants, before moving to Shea Stadium in Queens in 1964.

The passage of the federal Immigration Act of 1965, which abolished national-origin quotas, set the stage for increased immigration from Asia, which became the basis for New York's modern Asian American community.

On November 9, 1965, New York endured a widespread power blackout along with much of eastern North America. (The city's ordeal became the subject of the 1968 film, Where Were You When the Lights Went Out?) The postwar population shift to the suburbs resulted in the decline of textile manufacturing and other traditional industries in New York, most of which also operated in extremely outdated facilities. With the arrival of container shipping, that industry shifted to New Jersey where there was more room for it. Blue-collar neighborhoods began to deteriorate and become centers of drugs and crime. Strip clubs and other adult businesses started filling Times Square in the late 1960s.

In 1966, the US Navy decommissioned the Brooklyn Navy Yard, ending a command going back to the early 19th century. It was sold to the city. The Yard continued as a site for shipbuilding for another eleven years.

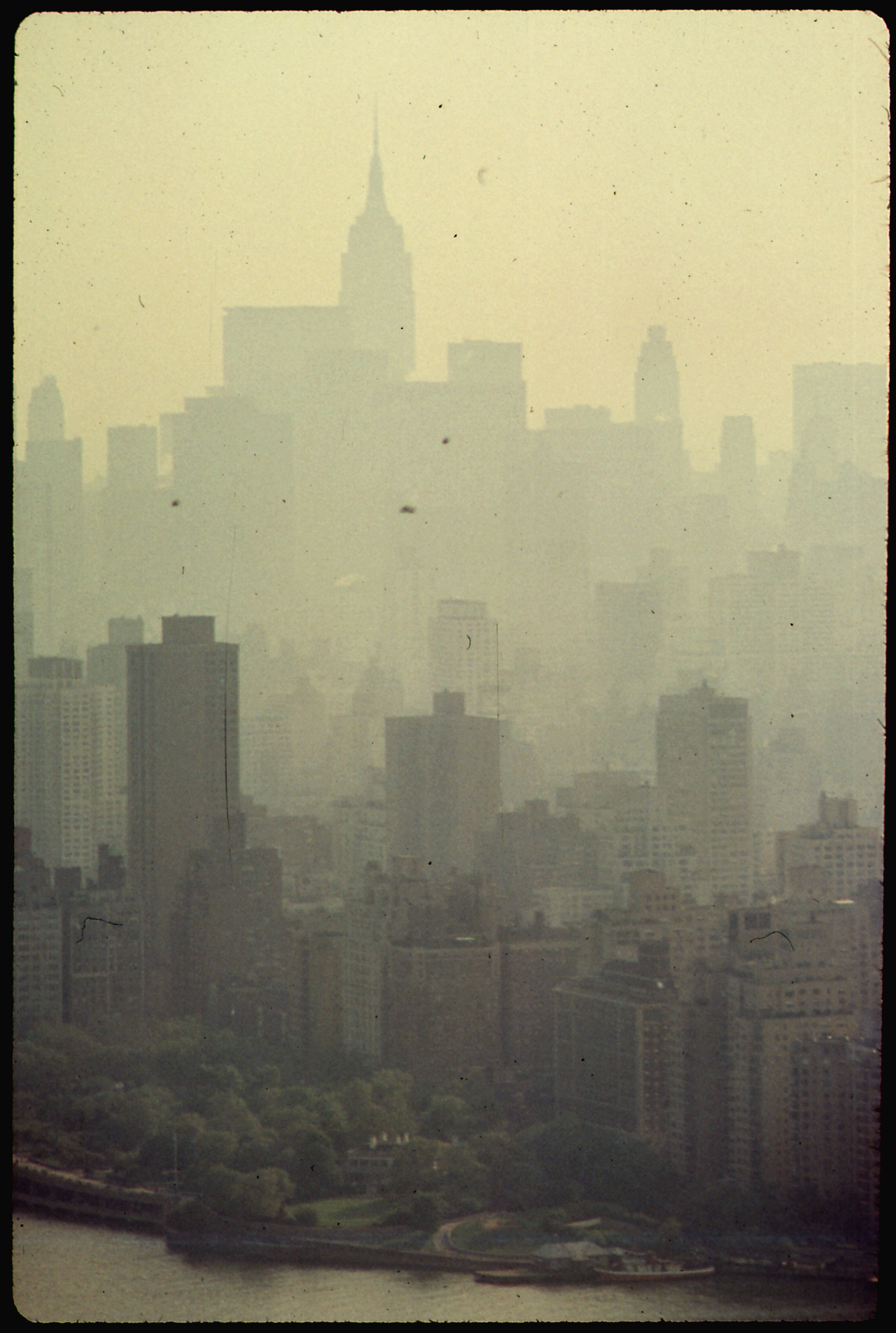
A 1973 photo of New York City skyscrapers in smog

From November 23 to 26, 1966, New York City was covered by a major smog episode, filling the city's air with damaging levels of several toxic pollutants. The smog was caused by a combination of factors, including the use of coal-burning power plants, the heavy traffic on the city's roads, and the widespread use of wood-burning stoves and fireplaces. It was the third major smog in New York City, following events of similar scale in 1953 and 1963.

=== Mayor Lindsay ===
John Lindsay, a liberal Republican, was a highly visible and charismatic mayor from 1966 to 1973. The city was a national center of protest movements regarding civil rights for black citizens, opposition to the Vietnam War, and the newly emerging feminist and gay movements. There were jolting economic shocks as the postwar prosperity came to an end with many factories and entire industries shutting down. There was a population transition with hundreds of thousands of African-Americans and Puerto Ricans moving in, and an exodus of European-Americans to the suburbs. Labor unions, especially in teaching, transit, sanitation and construction, fractured over major strikes and internal racial tensions.

=== Strikes and riots ===
The Transport Workers Union of America (TWU) led by Mike Quill shut down the city with a complete halt of subway and bus service on mayor John Lindsay's first day of office. As New Yorkers endured the transit strike, Lindsay remarked, "I still think it's a fun city," and walked four miles (6 km) from his hotel room to City Hall in a gesture to show it. Dick Schaap, then a columnist for the New York Herald Tribune, coined and popularized the sarcastic term in an article titled Fun City. In the article, Schaap sardonically pointed out that it was not.

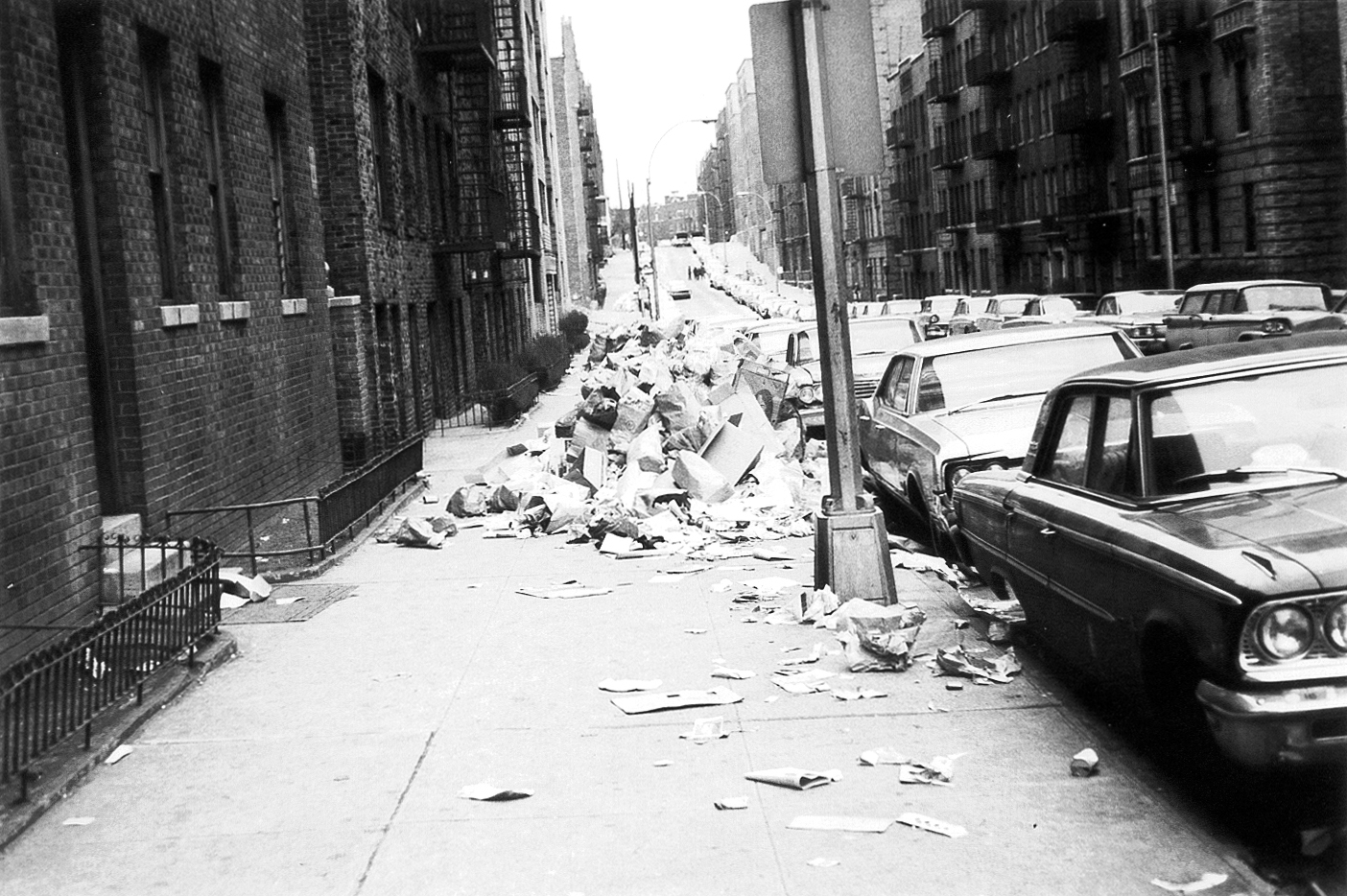
Anderson Avenue garbage strike. A common scene throughout New York City in 1968 during a sanitation workers strike

The transit strike was the first of many labor struggles. In 1968 the teachers' union (the United Federation of Teachers, or the UFT) went on strike over the firings of several teachers in a school in Ocean Hill and Brownsville.

That same year, 1968, also saw a nine-day sanitation strike. Quality of life in New York reached a nadir during this strike, as mounds of garbage caught fire, and strong winds whirled the filth through the streets. With the schools shut down, the police engaged in a slowdown, firefighters threatening job actions, the city awash in garbage, and racial and religious tensions breaking to the surface, Lindsay later called the last six months of 1968 "the worst of my public life."

The Stonewall riots were a series of spontaneous, violent demonstrations against a police raid that took place in the early morning hours of June 28, 1969, at the Stonewall Inn, in the Greenwich Village neighborhood of New York City. They are frequently cited as the first instance in American history when people in the homosexual community fought back against a government-sponsored system that persecuted sexual minorities, and they have become the defining event that marked the start of the gay rights movement in the United States and around the world.

== 1970s ==
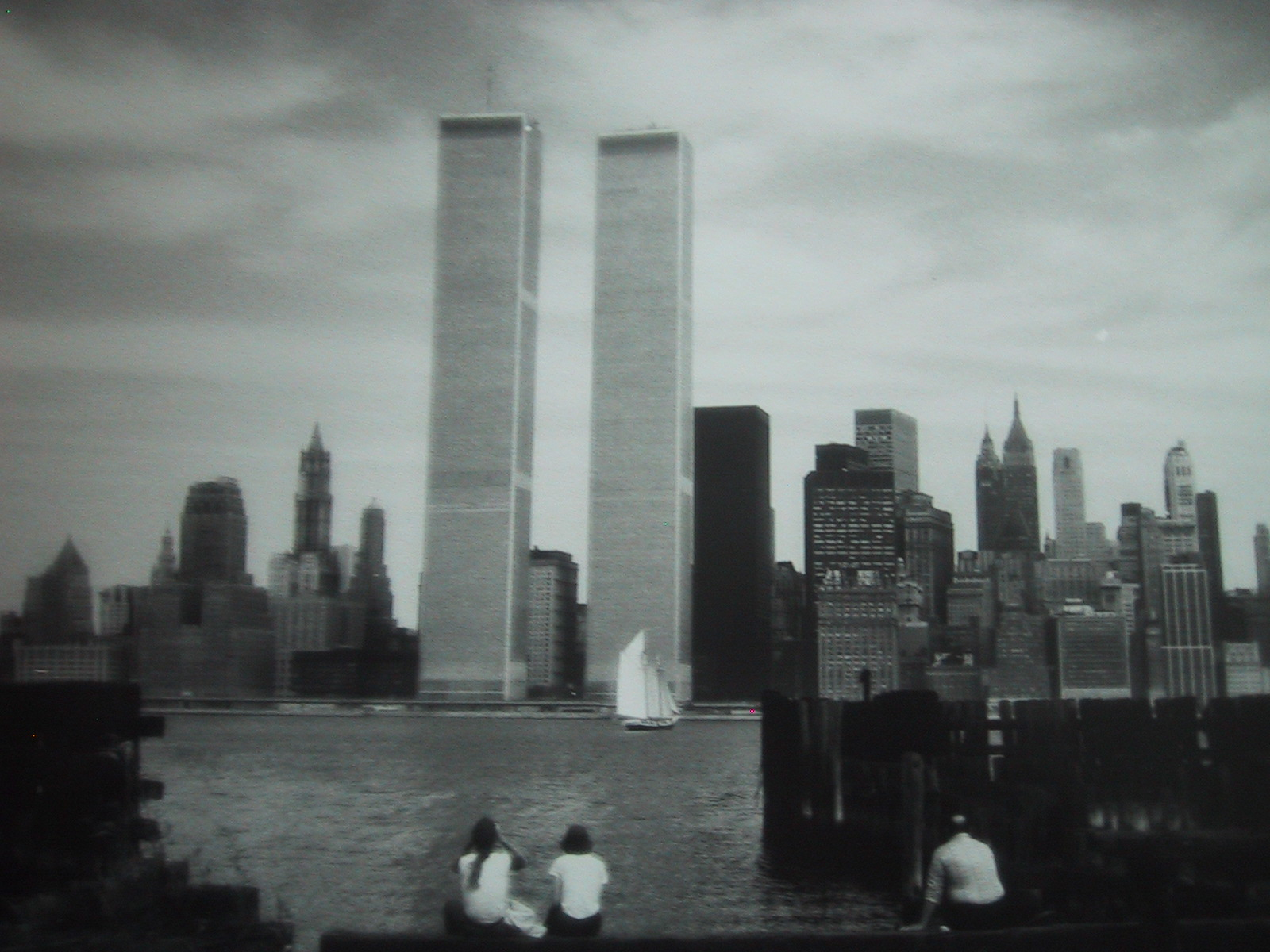
The World Trade Center, completed in 1973

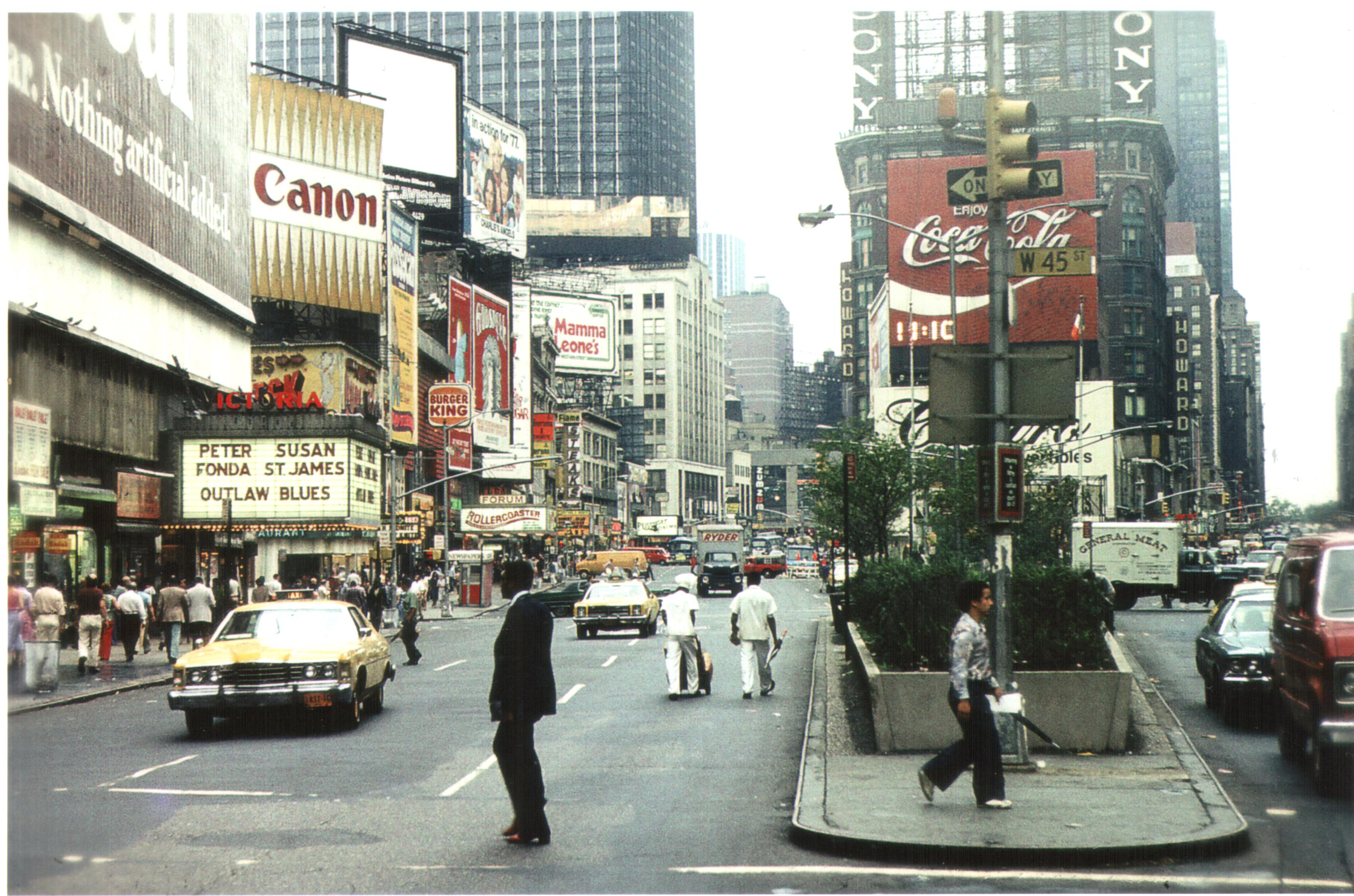
Times Square in 1977

By 1970, the city gained notoriety for high rates of crime and other social disorders. A popular song by Cashman & West in the autumn of 1972, "American City Suite", chronicled, in allegorical fashion, the decline in the city's quality of life. The city's subway system was regarded as unsafe due to crime and suffered frequent mechanical breakdowns. Over 80% of the South Bronx was burned or abandoned between 1970 and 1980, with 44 census tracts losing more than 50% and seven more than 97% of their buildings. According to historian Bench Ansfield, the most destructive fires were set by landlords or their hired hands, who collected enormous sums in insurance claims.

Prostitutes and pimps frequented Times Square, while Central Park became feared as the site of muggings and rapes. Homeless persons and drug dealers occupied boarded-up and abandoned buildings. The New York City Police Department was subject to investigation for widespread corruption, most famously in the 1971 testimony of whistle-blowing police officer Frank Serpico. In June 1975 after the city announced budget cuts downsizing the police force, officers distributed a pamphlet titled "Fear City" to arriving visitors, warning them to stay away.

The opening of the mammoth World Trade Center complex in 1972, however, was one of the few high points of the city's history at that time. Conceived by David Rockefeller and built by the Port Authority of New York and New Jersey on the site of the Radio Row electronics district in Lower Manhattan, the Twin Towers displaced the Empire State Building in Midtown as the world's tallest building; it was displaced in turn by Chicago's Sears Tower in 1973.

=== Fiscal crisis of 1975 ===
The 1970s were a low point in the city's modern history, and one of the lowest moments came when the New York Daily News reported the President's refusal to bail out the nation's largest city; he later relented.

US economic stagnation in the 1970s hit New York City particularly hard, amplified by a large movement of middle-class residents to the suburbs, which drained the city of tax revenue. In February 1975, New York City entered a serious fiscal crisis. Under mayor Abraham Beame, the city had run out of money to pay for normal operating expenses, was unable to borrow more, and faced the prospect of defaulting on its obligations and declaring bankruptcy. The city admitted an operating deficit of at least $600 million, contributing to a total city debt of more than $11 billion and the city was unable to borrow money from the credit markets. There were numerous reasons for the crisis, including overly optimistic forecasts of revenues, underfunding of pensions, use of capital allocations and reserves for operating costs, poor budgetary and accounting practices, extensive welfare programs, and reluctance to confront municipal labor unions.

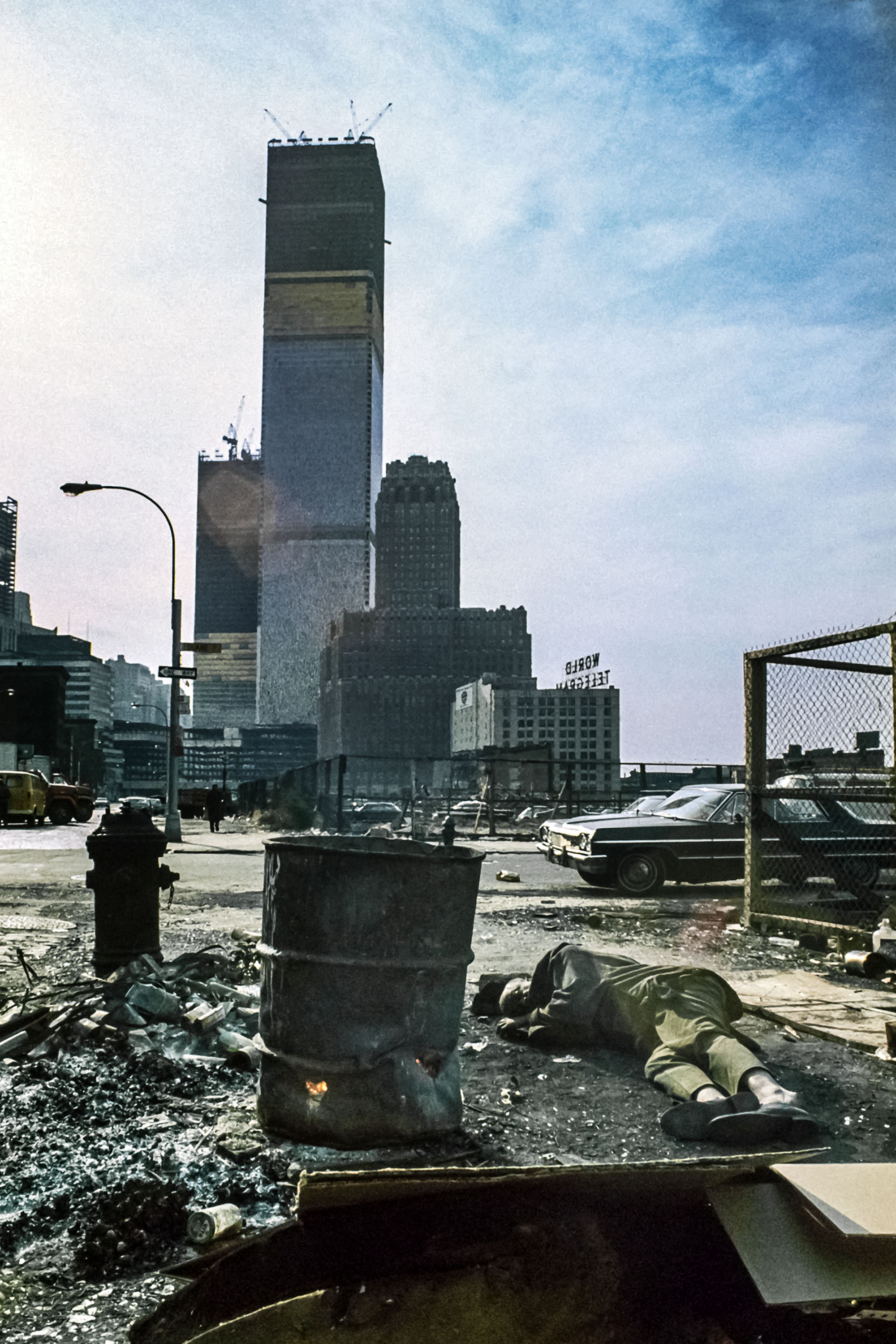
View of the World Trade Center under construction from Duane Street, Manhattan, 1970

The first solution proposed was the Municipal Assistance Corporation (MAC), established in June 1975 to pool the city's money and refinance its heavy debts. The State of New York also passed a state law that created an Emergency Financial Control Board, but even with all of these measures, the value of the MAC bonds dropped, and the city struggled to find the money to pay its employees and stay in operation. The Emergency Financial Control Board (EFCB), a state agency that took full control of the city's budget, drastically cut expenses. The city government narrowly avoided defaulting on October 17, 1975, after Albert Shanker, the teachers' union president, furnished $150 million to buy MAC bonds. Two weeks later, President Gerald R. Ford angered New Yorkers by refusing to grant the city a bailout. Ford later signed the New York City Seasonal Financing Act of 1975, a congressional bill that extended $2.3 billion worth of federal loans to the city for three years, in exchange for stringent financial controls.

Rohatyn and the MAC directors persuaded the banks to defer the maturity of the bonds they held and to accept less interest. They also persuaded the city and state employee pension funds to buy MAC bonds to pay off the city's debts. The city government cut the number of its employees by 40,000, deferred the wage increases already agreed to in contracts and kept them below the level of inflation. The loans were repaid with interest. A fiscal conservative, Democrat Ed Koch, was elected as mayor in 1977. By 1977–78, New York City had eliminated its short-term debt. By 1985, the City no longer needed the support of the Municipal Assistance Corporation, and it voted itself out of existence.

=== Blackout ===
The New York City blackout of 1977 struck on July 13 of that year and lasted for 25 hours, during which most neighborhoods in the city fell prey to destruction and looting. Over 3,000 people were arrested, and the city's already crowded prisons were so overburdened that some suggested reopening the recently condemned Manhattan Detention Complex.

The financial crisis, high crime rates, and damage from the blackouts led to a widespread belief that New York City was in irreversible decline and beyond redemption. By the end of the 1970s, nearly a million people had left, a population loss that would not be recouped for another twenty years. To Jonathan Mahler, the chronicler of The Bronx is Burning, "The clinical term for it, fiscal crisis, didn't approach the raw reality. Spiritual crisis was more like it."

== See also ==
- American urban history
- Timeline of New York City, 1950s–1970s
- 1949 New York City mayoral election
- 1953 New York City mayoral election
- 1957 New York City mayoral election
- 1961 New York City mayoral election
- 1965 New York City mayoral election
- 1969 New York City mayoral election
- 1973 New York City mayoral election
- 1977 New York City mayoral election

== Bibliography ==
- Jackson, Kenneth T., ed. The Encyclopedia of New York City (Yale University Press, 1995) 1350 pages; articles by experts; 2nd expanded edition 2010, 1585pp; online and can be downloaded
- Ansfield, Bench. Born in Flames: The Business of Arson and the Remaking of the American City (W. W. Norton, 2025);
- Brecher, Charles; et al. (1993). Power Failure: New York City Politics and Policy since 1960. New York: Oxford University Press. p. 420. Archived from the original on February 21, 2015 – via Questia.
- Burns, Ric, and James Sanders. New York: An Illustrated History (2003), large-scale book version of Burns PBS documentary, New York: A Documentary Film an eight part, 17½ hour documentary film directed by Ric Burns for PBS. It originally aired in 1999 with additional episodes airing in 2001 and 2003.
- Cannato, Vincent J. The ungovernable city: John Lindsay and his struggle to save New York (2001)
- Colgrove, James. "Reform and its discontents: public health in New York City during the Great Society." Journal of policy history (2007) 19#1 pp: 3–28. online
- Flanagan, Richard M. Robert Wagner and the Rise of New York City's Plebiscitary Mayoralty: The Tamer of the Tammany Tiger (Palgrave Macmillan, 2014)
- Freeman, Joshua B. Working-class New York: life and labor since World War II (2001)
- Gratz, Roberta Brandes. The Battle for Gotham: New York in the Shadow of Robert Moses and Jane Jacobs (Nation Books, 2011)
- Haslip-Viera, Gabriel. Boricuas In Gothamed: Puerto Ricans In The Making Of New York City (2004)
- Jacobs, James B., Coleen Friel, and Robert Raddick. Gotham unbound: How New York city was liberated from the grip of organized crime (NYU Press, 2001)
- Korrol, Virginia Sanchez and Pedro Juan Hernandez. Pioneros II: Puerto Ricans in New York City, 1948–1998 (2010), 127pp
- Levinson, Marc. "Container Shipping and the Decline of New York, 1955–1975." Business History Review (2006) 80#1 pp: 49–80.
- Lagumina, Salvator. New York at Mid-Century: The Impellitteri Years (1992), He was Mayor in 1950–53
- Mahler, Jonathan. The Bronx is Burning: 1977, Baseball, Politics, and the Battle for the Soul of a City (2006)
- Mollenkopf, John, ed. Power, Culture, and Place (Russell Sage Foundation, 1988)
- Morris, Charles R. The cost of good intentions: New York City and the liberal experiment, 1960–1975 (1981).
- Orlebeke, Charles J. "Saving New York: The Ford Administration and the New York City Fiscal Crisis," in Alexej Ugrinsky and Bernard J. Firestone eds. Gerald R. Ford and the Politics of Post-Watergate America - Vol. 2 (1993) pp 359–85 With commentary by Abraham D. Beame, Hugh L. Carey, et al. pp 386–414 online
- Plunz, Richard. A history of housing in New York City (Columbia UP, 2018).
- Podair, Jerald E. The Strike That Changed New York: Blacks, Whites, and the Ocean Hill-Brownsville Crisis (Yale University Press, 2008)
- Roberts, Sam, ed. America's Mayor: John V. Lindsay and the Reinvention of New York (2010) Essays on multiple topics, well illustrated
- Samuel, Lawrence R. New York City 1964: A Cultural History (McFarland, 2014)
- Sayre, Wallace S. and Herbert Kaufman, Governing New York City: Politics in the Metropolis (1965) 782pp
- Shefter, Martin. Political crisis/fiscal crisis: The collapse and revival of New York City (Columbia University Press, 1992)
- Shelton, Jon. "Dropping Dead: Teachers, the New York City Fiscal Crisis, and Austerity" in Shelton, Teacher Strike! Public Education and the Making of a New American Political Order (U of Illinois Press, 2017) pp 114–142. excerpt
- Taylor, Clarence, ed. Civil Rights in New York City: From World War II to the Giuliani Era (Oxford University Press, 2011)
- Thomas, Lorrin. Puerto Rican citizen: history and political identity in twentieth-century New York City (University of Chicago Press, 2010)
- Tochterman, Brian L. The Dying City: Postwar New York and the Ideology of Fear (2017), Covers late 1940s to the 1980s
- Viteritti, Joseph P. Summer in the City: John Lindsay, New York, and the American Dream (2014) Essays by scholars evaluate politics, race relations, finance, public management, architecture, economic development, and the arts.
- Wollman, Elizabeth L. Hard Times: The Adult Musical in 1970s New York City (Oxford University Press, 2013)

Preceded by History of New York City (1898–1945)	History of New York City (1946–1977)	Succeeded by History of New York City (1978–present)
