= Travelers Aid Society of New York =

The Travelers Aid Society of New York (TAS-NY) was founded by Grace Hoadley Dodge in New York City in 1907, to provide social work to women traveling alone in order to protect them from moral danger. Thirteen other prominent Christian and Jewish women, including the social worker Belle Moskowitz, made up the Society's first Board of Directors.

The Travelers Aid Society believed that the greatest threat to female travelers in the early twentieth century was white slave trafficking, defined as the coercion of "white" women into prostitution and their subsequent sale to procurers or male clients. Agents of the Society patrolled Grand Central Terminal and Pennsylvania Station, as well as the city's piers where transatlantic ocean liners docked, looking for women who they identified as vulnerable. Services usually entailed safely escorting women, immigrant and native-born alike, to city addresses, other transportation lines, or to a temporary lodging home, such as the YWCA.

The Travelers Aid Society's first headquarters was a four-story row house located a short walk from Grand Central Terminal at 238 East 48th St in the Turtle Bay neighborhood.

When Grace Dodge died in 1914, General Secretary Orin Clarkson Baker became the driving force behind the Travelers Aid Society. Baker oversaw the expansion of its work in the city. By 1917, the Society had agents on duty at all the major rail terminals in New York and New Jersey and met all of the incoming transatlantic ocean liners, as well as some domestic ships. Baker abruptly resigned from the Society in 1919.
