= Valley Stream State Park =

State park in the U.S. state of New York

Coordinates: 40°40′44″N 73°41′38″W

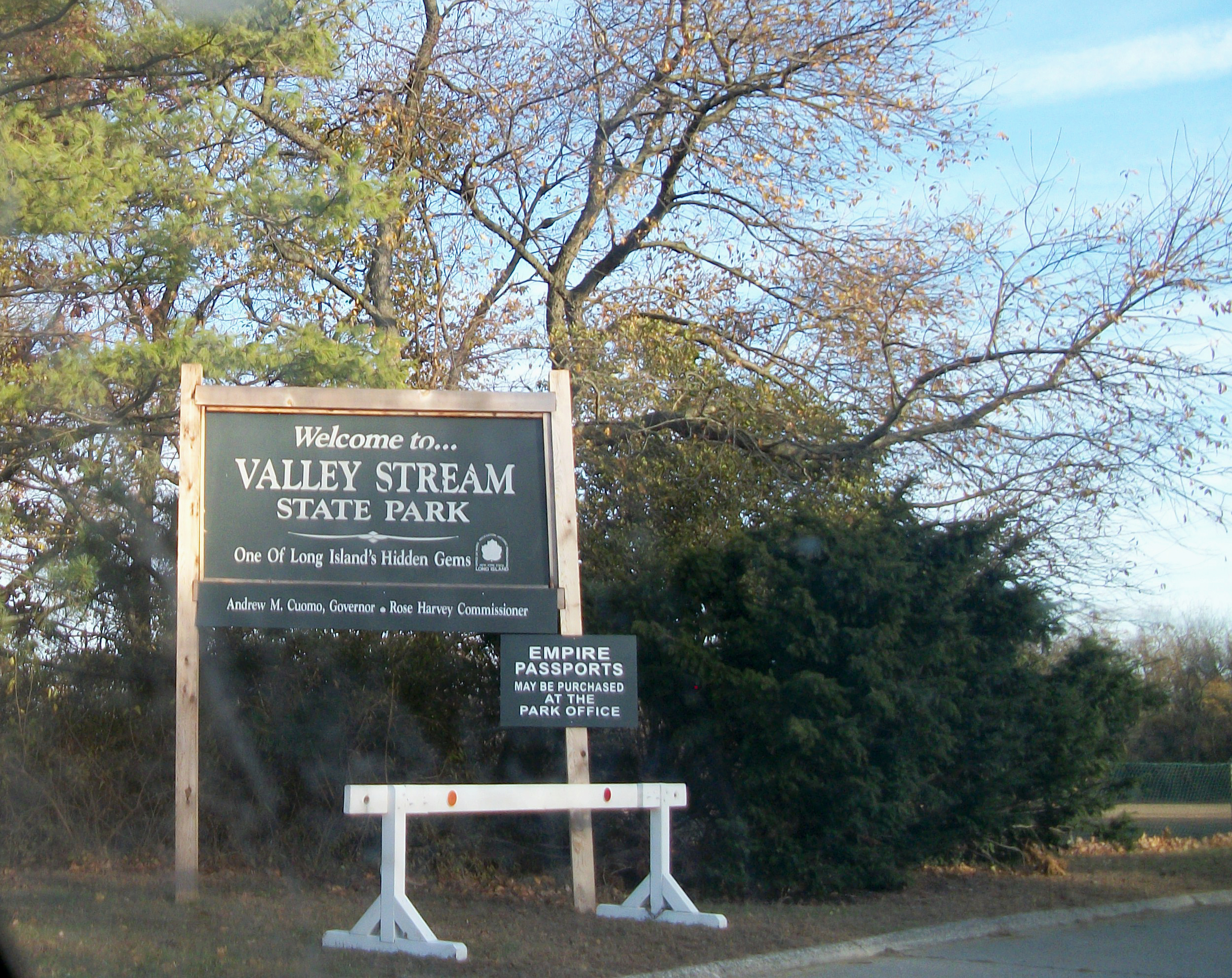
- The entrance to Valley Stream State Park from the eastbound Southern State Parkway.
- Interactive map of Valley Stream State Park
- Type: State park
- Location: Valley Stream, New York, United States
- Area: 97 acres (39 ha)
- Opened: 1928
- Owner: State of New York
- Operator: New York State Department of Parks, Recreation and Historic Preservation
- Parking: Yes
- Website: parks.ny.gov/parks/159/details.aspx

Valley Stream State Park is a 97-acre (39 ha) state park located in the Incorporated Village of Valley Stream, in Nassau County, on Long Island, in New York, United States. It is one of three state parks located within the Town of Hempstead.

== Park description ==
Valley Stream State Park is a day-use facility, convenient to the Southern State Parkway (exit 15A). The park offers a nature trail, cross-country skiing, a playground and playing fields, horseshoe, volleyball, basketball, and bocce ball courts, picnic tables and pavilions, fireplaces and grills, and recreation programs.

Like Hempstead Lake State Park, Valley Stream State Park contained Cornell's Pond, a feeder reservoir for the Ridgewood Reservoir.

== History ==
This park opened in 1928 together with Southern State Parkway, Hempstead Lake State Park, Belmont Lake State Park, and Heckscher State Park. Initially the park included Cornell's Pond, which had a freshwater beach that charged an admission fee of 10 cents. Crowded and unsanitary conditions led local residents to lobby for its closing in 1947. In 1958, the state to transferred the park's southern portion with this pond to the Village of Valley Stream. It reopened as the village-operated Arthur J. Hendrickson Park.

== See also ==
- List of New York state parks
- Long Island State Park Commission
- Robert Moses
