= Rebecca B. Rankin =

American librarian (1887–1965)

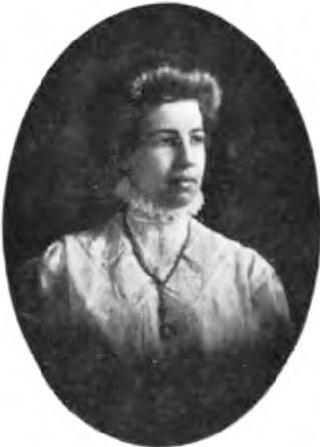
- Born: April 5, 1887; Piqua
- Died: March 1, 1965 (aged 77); Dobbs Ferry
- Occupation: Librarian

Rebecca Browning Rankin (April 5, 1887 – March 1, 1965) was the director of the New York City's Municipal Reference Library for thirty-two years. New York City Mayor Fiorello LaGuardia called Rankin a "human index to New York City affairs," and she gained a reputation as the City's unofficial historian. Her efforts secured the preservation of historic documents and promoted access to government information for municipal employees and citizens alike.

== Early life, education, and early career ==
Rebecca Browning Rankin was born April 5, 1887, in Piqua, Ohio. She grew up in Illinois.

Rankin attended the University of Michigan, graduating with her bachelor's degree in 1909. She received a full scholarship to attend Simmons University in Boston, where she earned her master in library science degree in 1913.

While her undergraduate degree at the University of Michigan, Rankin worked in the cataloging department of the university's general library. Upon graduating with her master's degree in 1913, she received several job offers, deciding to take the opportunity to run the library for the State Normal School in Ellensburg, Washington. In her five years at the Washington State Normal School, she developed a library collection that emphasized the most current information for the training of teachers. Rankin started a bulletin sharing information with teachers across the state, as well as teaching courses on library methods.

== Career with NYPL and the Municipal Reference Library ==
In 1918, Rankin moved to New York City to support her family, and took a position as assistant to New York Public Library (NYPL) director Edwin H. Anderson. Just a few months later, in January 1919, Rankin was named the assistant librarian at the Municipal Reference Library (MRL), a branch of the NYPL. She was appointed the Municipal Reference Library's director in 1920.

In her role as director of the MRL, Rankin worked to promote the resources and services of the library. She and her staff prepared and delivered over 300 radio talks between 1928 and 1938, with weekly broadcasts over WNYC sharing civic information and promoting the library's services. These took the form of multiple WNYC series, including "Civics-in-Action" and "Highlights in Municipal Government". Rankin used these broadcasts as a way to advance her fervent beliefs in the ideas of reform and efficiency in government. In a March 1928 WNYC broadcast, she described the library's role to listeners, listing its functions as encouraging city officials to "intelligently adopt the best policies for the governing of the City," providing resources to city employees and citizens, and answering questions about the city and its governance. She published her first book, Guide to the Municipal Government of the City of New York in 1936. Also in 1936, with the help of seven assistants, Rankin edited New York Advancing: a Scientific Approach to Municipal Government. Historian Elisabeth Israels Perry credits Rankin and Pearl Bernstein, the Secretary of the Board of Estimate, with writing Mayor La Guardia's essay for the book from a list of points that he gave to them. New York Advancing became a surprise bestseller in the city, with subsequent editions being published in 1939 and 1946. Rankin told a New York Times reporter: "Women have the 'feel' of the tie-up between the man in the street and his government" and therefore they could make the book accessible to a broad audience.

She was a strong supporter of Mayor Fiorello LaGuardia, who frequently contacted the library with questions. New York City's municipal records had been stored in haphazard conditions for decades, and Rankin worked to transfer particularly important collections to the Municipal Library. Rankin persuaded Mayor LaGuardia to establish the Mayor's Municipal Archives Committee, which she chaired for over ten years. Under the Committee's charge, the MRL became the chief institution for New York City's archival and records management functions. Mayor William O'Dwyer requested that Rankin develop a modern records management program; she developed a record retention manual and a training course for records managers.

The City had purchased the 12-story Rhinelander Building in 1939 to house historical records, but only after Rankin's continued efforts was funding authorized for appropriate staff, shelving, and boxes. By moving inactive records to a centralized storage facility, the municipal departments of the city saved about $1,200,000 in rent from 1942 to 1952. In 1952, Mayor Vincent R. Impellitteri commended Rankin for her efforts in making the new Municipal Archives and Records Center (MARC) a reality. She retired on the day the new center opened, June 30, 1952.

== Service to librarianship ==
Rankin served as the president of the Special Libraries Association from 1922 to 1923. In the 1930s, she served as the SLA Secretary, organizing the association's headquarters in New York City. In May 1959, she was inducted into the Special Libraries Association Hall of Fame.

Her relationships with municipal employees played a key role in ensuring that NYC's public librarians were designated as eligible for the New York State Employee's pension and retirement system.

== Death and legacy ==
Rankin died March 1, 1965, at the Dobbs Ferry Hospital in Dobbs Ferry, New York.

A biography of the important role Rankin played as New York City's "unofficial historian" was published by Barry W. Seaver in 2004: A True Politician: Rebecca Browning Rankin, Municipal Reference Librarian of the City of New York, 1920–1952.
