= Benfey =

Benfey is a surname. Notable people with the surname include:

- Christopher Benfey (born 1954), American literary critic
- Ida Benfey Judd (c. 1858–1952), American educator
- Otto Theodor Benfey (1925–2024), German-born American chemist and historian of science
- Theodor Benfey (1809–1881), German philologist and scholar of Sanskrit
- Theodore Benfey (1871–1935), American politician
