= Long Island State Parkway Police =

Long Island State Parkway Police patch

The Long Island State Parkway Police is a defunct New York State law enforcement agency that once patrolled state parks and parkways on Long Island, New York.

== History ==
After the New York State Park Commission was first created in 1902, New York State Police had responsibility for patrolling parks and parkways. In 1946, Long Island State Park Commission President Robert Moses created the Long Island State Park Police Department to patrol Long Island’s parks. Throughout its existence, the force was strongly identified with Moses, the so-called "master builder," and provided his chauffeurs and bodyguards.

In 1950, the name of the agency was changed to the Long Island State Parkway Police to reflect its added responsibility of patrolling the parkways in addition to the parks.

=== Dissolution ===
In 1980, with Moses's power broken, the New York State legislature passed legislation giving the New York State Police responsibility for the state parkways, while the New York State Park Police maintained responsibility for the parks. Officers of the Long Island State Parkway Police were given the option of transferring to either the State Police or the State Park Police.

Headquartered at Belmont Lake State Park in North Babylon, the New York State Park Police currently patrols 25,000 acres (101 km^{2}) of parkland in Nassau and Suffolk Counties.

== Fallen officers ==
During the existence of the Long Island State Parkway Police Department, two officers died in the line of duty.

== See also ==
- List of law enforcement agencies in New York
- List of Long Island law enforcement agencies
