= Belmont Lake State Park =

State park in New York, United States

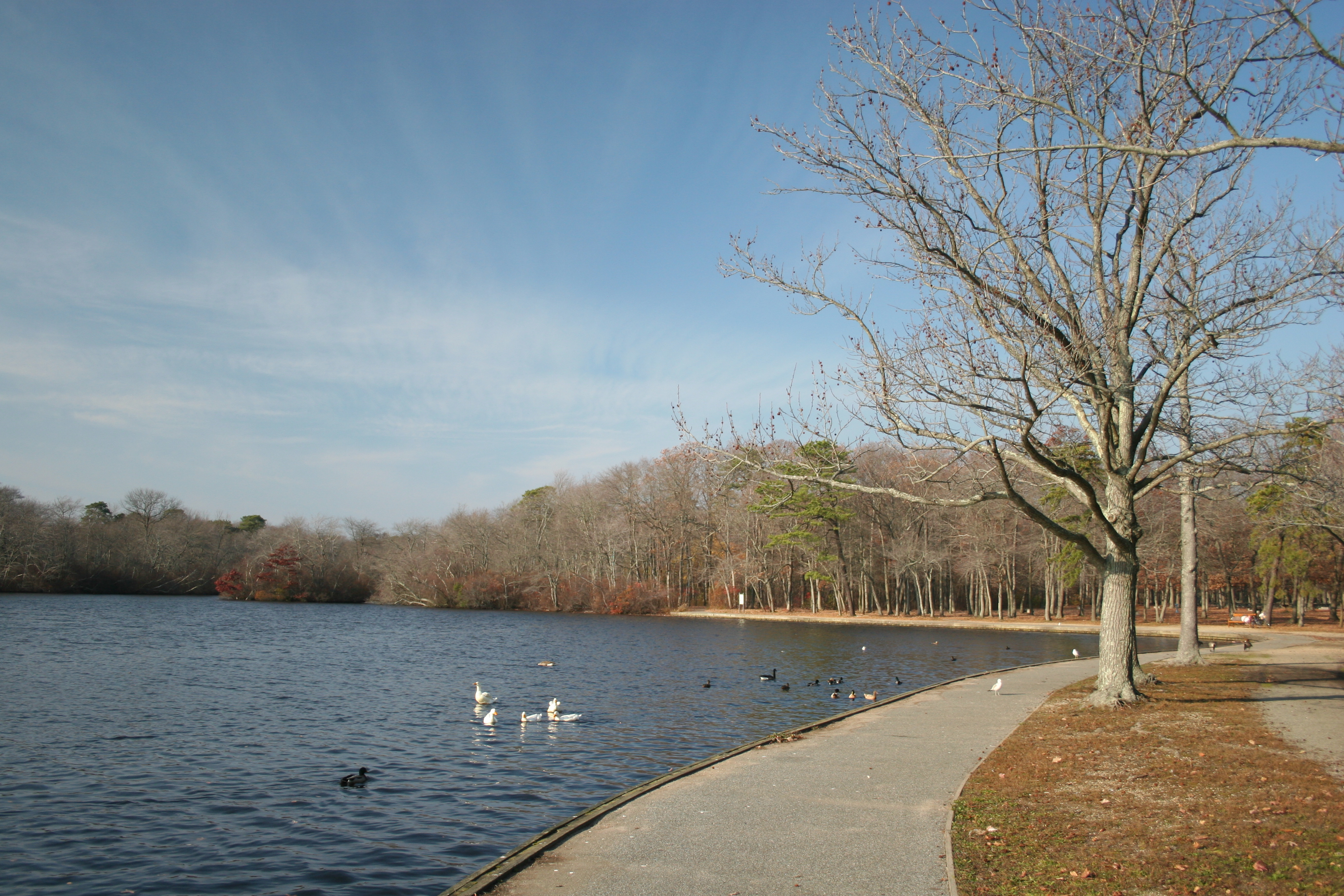
- Belmont Lake

- Location within New York
- Type: State park
- Location: Southern State Parkway Exit 38; North Babylon, New York
- Coordinates: 40°44′N 73°20′W
- Area: 463 acres (1.87 km^{2})
- Created: 1926
- Operator: New York State Office of Parks, Recreation and Historic Preservation
- Visitors: 1,082,334 (in 2024)
- Open: All year
- Website: Belmont Lake State Park

Belmont Lake State Park is a 463-acre (1.87 km^{2}) day-use state park located in North Babylon, New York, United States on Long Island.

== History ==
Belmont Lake State Park was established in 1926 on land that was formerly part of the "Nursery Stud Farm", a Thoroughbred horse farm owned by August Belmont, namesake of the Belmont Stakes.

The park was selected by Robert Moses as regional headquarters for all state parks on Long Island in 1935. The park served as the headquarters of the Long Island State Park Commission and Long Island State Parkway Police from their founding in 1946 until their disbandment in 1977 and 1980, respectively. It now serves as the headquarters of the Long Island region of the New York State Office of Parks, Recreation and Historic Preservation, as well as the New York State Park Police.

== Park description ==
Belmont Lake State Park is a day-use park, featuring boating and picnicking facilities in addition to playing fields for popular sports. Two modern children's playgrounds are also available. Pedal boats, rowboats and kayaks can be rented at the boat dock from May through Columbus Day.

The park is located near the Southern State Parkway at Exit 38. Bike and pedestrian entrances exist at several points around the perimeter which are free all year long. The park also contains a bicycle path leading to Southards Pond and Argyle Lake in the Village of Babylon.

== See also ==
- List of New York state parks
