= Elisabeth Israels Perry =

American historian (1939–2018)

- Born: Elisabeth Miriam Israels; March 29, 1939; New York, New York, U.S.
- Died: November 11, 2018 (aged 79); Omaha, Nebraska, U.S.
- Other name: Elisabeth Israels Lazarof
- Occupations: Historian, college professor
- Spouse(s): Henri Lazarof (m. 1958); Lewis Perry (m. 1970)
- Relatives: Belle Moskowitz (grandmother); Mordecai Bauman (stepfather); Chuck Israels (brother)

Elisabeth Israels Perry (March 29, 1939 – November 11, 2018) was an American feminist historian and college professor. She was president of the Society for Historians of the Gilded Age and Progressive Era (SHGAPE) from 1998 to 2000.

== Early life and education ==
Perry was born in New York City, the daughter of Irma Commanday Bauman and her first husband, attorney Carlos Lindner Israels. Her mother and stepfather, singer Mordecai Bauman, co-founded and ran the Indian Hill Music Workshop in Massachusetts. Her brother is jazz musician Chuck Israels; their paternal grandmother was activist Belle Moskowitz.

Perry attended Hunter College High School, graduated from the University of California, Los Angeles in 1960, and completed her doctoral studies in French history there in 1967, based on research she conducted in Paris on a Fulbright fellowship.

== Career ==
Perry taught at the University of Colorado Boulder, the University of Cincinnati, the University of Iowa, Vanderbilt University, and Brooklyn College. She and her husband held a joint faculty appointment at Saint Louis University, where she was chair of the history department and interim chair of the women's studies department. In 1994 she was named director of the master's program in women's history at Sarah Lawrence College. She directed the NEH Summer Seminar in Women's History seven times.

Perry was president of the Society for Historians of the Gilded Age and Progressive Era (SHGAPE) from 1998 to 2000. She contributed articles to the Jewish Women's Archive and The Encyclopedia of New York City, and was a member of the editorial advisory board of Jewish Women in America: An Historical Encyclopedia (1997).

== Publications ==
Perry's research appeared in scholarly journals including Labor History, American Quarterly, Canadian Review of American Studies, New York History, Tennessee Historical Quarterly, Journal of Women's History, National Forum, OAH Magazine of History, and The Journal of the Gilded Age and Progressive Era.

- From Theology to History: French Religious Controversy and the Revocation of the Edict of Nantes (1973)
- "Industrial reform in New York City: Belle Moskowitz and the protocol of peace, 1913–1916" (1982)
- "'The General Motherhood of the Commonwealth': Dance Hall Reform in the Progressive Era" (1985)
- "Scholars Confront the ERA" (1987, review essay)
- "Women's Political Choices After Suffrage: The Women's City Club of New York, 1915-1990" (1990)
- Belle Moskowitz: Feminine Politics and the Exercise of Power in the Age of Alfred E. Smith (1992)
- The Challenge of Feminist Biography: Writing the Lives of Modern American Women (1992, co-editor with Sara Alpern, Joyce Antler, and Ingrid Winther Scobie)
- ""The Very Best Influence": Josephine Holloway and Girl Scouting in Nashville's African-American Community" (1993)
- "From Achievement to Happiness: Girl Scouting In Middle Tennessee, 1910s-1960s" (1993)
- Women in Action: Rebels and Reformers 1920-1980 (1995, for the League of Women Voters)
- America: Pathways to the Present (1995, textbook, with Andrew Cayton, Linda Reed, and Allan M. Winkler)
- "Critical Journey: From Belle Moskowitz to Women's History" (1997)
- "The Changing Meanings of the Progressive Era" (1999)
- "Rhetoric, Strategy, and Politics in the New York Campaign for Women's Jury Service, 1917-1975" (2001)
- "Men Are from the Gilded Age, Women Are from the Progressive Era" (2002)
- After the Vote: Feminist Politics in La Guardia’s New York (2018)

== Personal life ==
Elisabeth Israels married Bulgarian-born composer Henri Lazarof in 1958. She married fellow historian Lewis Perry in 1970. They had two children together, Susanna and David. She died from cancer in 2018, at the age of 79, in Omaha, Nebraska.
