= Long Island State Park Commission =

New York state government agency

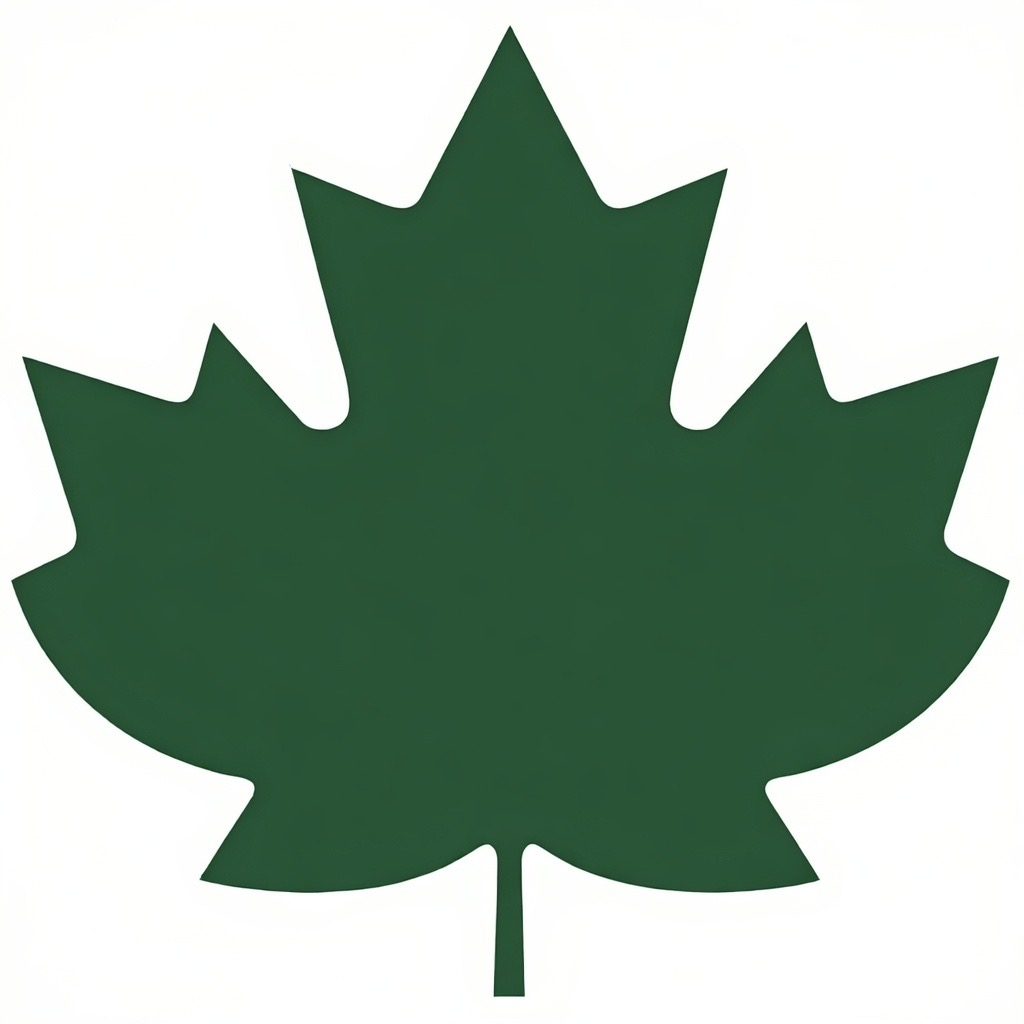

Agency overview
- Formed: January 8, 1924
- Jurisdiction: Long Island, U.S.
- Headquarters: Belmont Lake State Park, North Babylon, New York, U.S.
- Agency executive: Robert Moses, Founder/President (1924-1963)
- Parent department: New York State Office of Parks, Recreation and Historic Preservation
- Website: https://parks.ny.gov/visit/regions/welcome-long-island-region

The Long Island State Park Commission, also known as LISPC or LISP, is a government agency on Long Island, in the state of New York, headquartered at Belmont Lake State Park in North Babylon. Originally a standalone agency, it is now a regional subdivision of the New York State Office of Parks, Recreation, and Historic Preservation.

== History ==
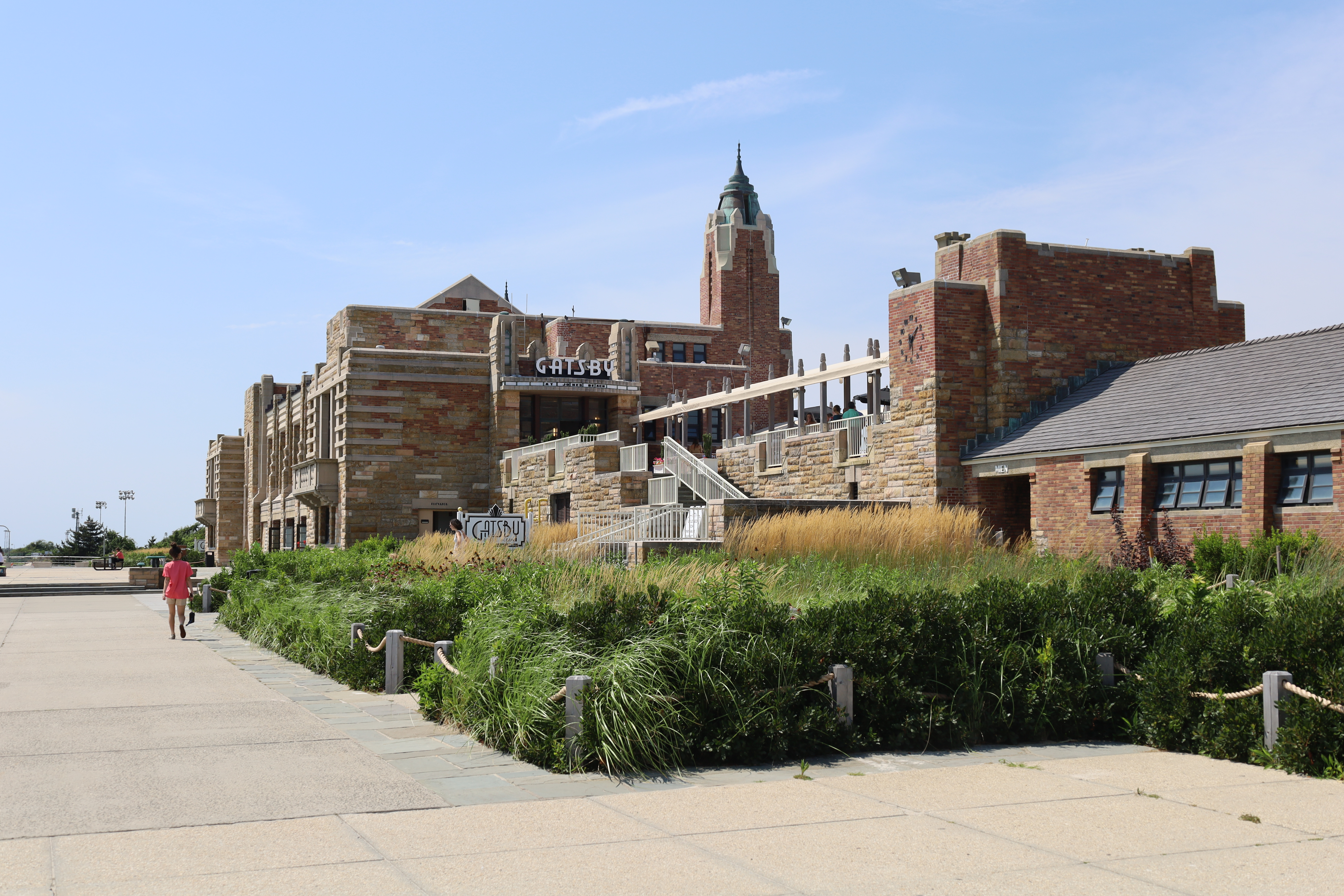
Jones Beach State Park in Wantagh, New York, in 2021

The LISPC was created in 1924 by the New York State Legislature to build and operate parks and parkways on Long Island. Governor Al Smith was appointed as its first President, and Robert Moses, who had drafted the bill creating the agency, served until 1963.. The Long Island State Park Commission was once considered to be the most powerful and influential New York State agencies. Jones Beach State Park opened in 1929 and continued to develop and expand throughout the 1930’s despite the Great Depression displaying just how much money and power the agency had at the time. In 1946, Robert Moses created the Long Island State Park Police later renamed to Long Island State Parkway Police in 1950 to alleviate New York State Park Police’s responsibility of patrolling both parks and parkways.

Among the several parks constructed and formerly operated by the Long Island State Park Commission are Bethpage State Park, Jones Beach State Park, Sunken Meadow State Park, Montauk Point State Park, Robert Moses State Park, Belmont Lake State Park, Valley Stream State Park., and others. The LISPC also oversaw the construction of Long Island's parkway system, which includes the Northern State Parkway, the Southern State Parkway, the Sagtikos State Parkway, the Bethpage State Parkway, the Sunken Meadow State Parkway, the Robert Moses Causeway and several others.

Around 1980, the Long Island State Park Commission was dissolved as a standalone agency, with jurisdiction over its parks largely being taken over by the New York State Office of Parks, Recreation and Historic Preservation, while its parkway maintenance was taken over by the New York State Department of Transportation however, ownership of these parkways still belong to the State Parks.

== Governance ==
The Long Island State Park Commission is a regional subdivision of the New York State Office of Parks, Recreation, and Historic Preservation, one of its eleven Regional Park Commissions.

== See also ==
- Long Island State Parkway Police
- New York State Parkway System
- Triborough Bridge and Tunnel Authority
