= Belle Moskowitz =

American social activist (1877–1933)

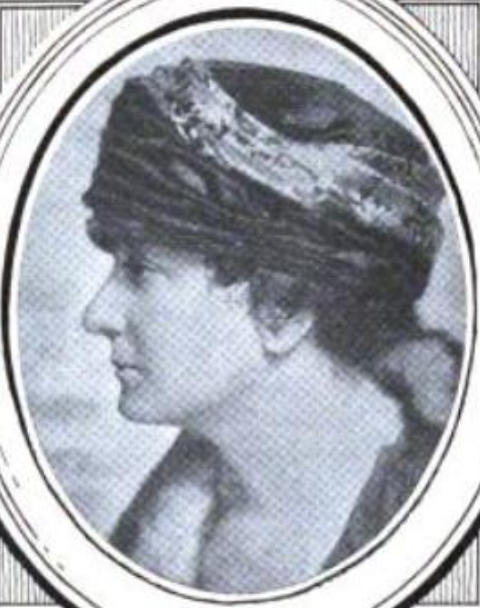
- Belle Moskowitz, from a 1924 publication
- Born: Belle Lindner; October 5, 1877; New York City
- Died: January 2, 1933 (aged 55); New York City
- Spouse(s): Charles Henry Israels Henry Moskowitz (m. 1914–1933)
- Children: 3
- Relatives: Elisabeth Israels Perry (granddaughter); Chuck Israels (grandson)

Belle Moskowitz (née Lindner, Israels; October 5, 1877 – January 2, 1933) was a Jewish-American progressive reformer and political advisor in the early 20th century. She worked as a political advisor and publicist to New York Governor and 1928 Democratic presidential candidate Al Smith. In her obituary, the New York Times referred to her as the most powerful woman in U.S. politics.

== Early life ==
Belle Lindner was born on October 5, 1877 in Harlem, New York City. She was raised in an Ashkenazi Jewish family; her parents were Isidor Lindner (Yiddish: איזידאָר לינדנער) and Esther Freyer (Yiddish: אסתּר פֿרײַער לינדנער), religious immigrants from East Prussia. They worked in watchmaking.

Isidor was a cantor at Temple Israel, the first synagogue in Harlem. As a young girl, Belle Lindner would have been exposed to the charitable activities of the temple's female Sisterhood, a group which collected money, organized sewing for the poor, and worked with United Hebrew Charities. The Sisterhood also organized a "Working Girl's Vacation Fund" and a "Working Girl's Club" to improve the qualities of life for women living in the city. These activities have much in common with Lindner's later advocacy for young working-class women and recreational opportunities.

Lindner attended the Horace Mann School, a laboratory school of Teachers College. In 1894 she attended Teachers College, Columbia University, where she studied oral interpretation of literature with Ida Benfey Judd. She stayed for only one year, opting instead for private lessons with Henrich Conreid, future Metropolitan Opera director, who believed she had great potential as a performer.

Early in her life, worked as an actress, and performed for private events. She later taught acting and elocution to children and considered work as a professional actress before going into politics.

== Career ==
=== Early career ===
In 1900, at the age of 23, Belle Lindner became a social worker at the Educational Alliance, an organization whose primary focus was cultural assimilation for Jewish immigrants. She held various appointments there, eventually becoming director of entertainments and exhibits.

After leaving the Alliance, Lindner (now Belle Israels) wrote for the United Hebrew Charities and Charities, a social work journal, for which she later became an editorial assistant. She also joined the New York section of the Council of Jewish Women, another organization that helped Jewish immigrants. With her role as chair of the philanthropy committee, her focus was welfare work. She oversaw sick and poor children at a hospital on Randall’s Island and visited troubled girls in reformatories. In 1907, Belle Israels joined the first board of directors for the New York branch of the Travelers’ Aid Society, an organization formed with the aim of protecting solo female travelers from trafficking and other situations that threatened their safety.

Her first effort at social reform was to clean up and license the city's commercial dance halls, which she saw as places that got young working girls into trouble. Working through the Council of Jewish Women-New York Section, by 1910 she had won laws that regulated dance hall conditions, including fire and safety and the selling of alcoholic drinks. The New York Times stated, "These laws did more to improve the moral surroundings of young girls" than any other single social reform of the period.

Her first published article, "Social Work Among Young Women", focused on the importance of clubs in girls' socialization as well as the importance women have in shaping communities. She concluded that when women are influenced by "right ideals, social, moral, artistic, intellectual, the higher becomes their standard of living."

This work eventually led to her first major project: The Lakeview Home for Girls, which opened for permanent use 1911. The Lakeview was located on Staten Island and gave young women temporary shelter, as well as aid in finding work.

In the 1912 presidential election, Israels publicly aligned with the platform of Theodore Roosevelt's Progressive Party, which emphasized labor protections and occupational safety. In a letter to fellow reformer Lillian Wald, she stated that “social reform has the services of America’s first publicity man [Roosevelt] and our ideas will become common currency.” During the same year, she worked locally as a Progressive ward leader for her home district in Yonkers and helped to elect a party member alderman there.

=== Triangle Shirtwaist Factory fire ===
In 1913, after the Triangle Shirtwaist Factory fire, Israels began working to promote the grievances of workers. She mediated disputes between the Garment District unions and employers as a grievance clerk for the Dress and Waist Manufacturing Association. She was fired from this role for ruling in favor of labor unions in a majority of cases, but was rehired in January 1914 and ascended to the role of labor department manager, staying until fall 1916.

=== Labor mediation and World War I ===
In addition to her work as a labor mediator in the Garment District, Israels also worked privately as an industrial mediator, writer, and advisor. In a flyer for her business, she offered counseling for factory planning and employment management that would benefit both employees and employers. She wrote, "Discontented or poorly trained workers, unsuited to their jobs, threaten the peace of the shop. Whatever threatens peace threatens profit." She was said in the New York Times to have resolved over 10,000 grievance cases.

Following America’s entry into World War I in April 1917, Belle Israels (now Moskowitz) observed that there was no female counterpart to the all-male Mayor’s Committee on National Defense to coordinate the wartime efforts of various women’s groups across New York City. She successfully proposed such a group to Mayor John Purroy Mitchel, leading to the formation of a Committee of Women on National Defense. Moskowitz served as group secretary and thought through plans for the mass entry of women into the workforce in the event of a loss of male labor due to the draft.

=== Al Smith gubernatorial campaign ===
In the 1918 New York gubernatorial election, Belle and her second husband Henry Moskowitz pivoted from supporting Progressive and anti-political machine "fusion" candidates to backing Democratic candidate Al Smith for governor. Although Smith had ties to the Tammany Hall machine, which the Moskowitzes had opposed in their previous political advocacy, his support of labor issues aligned with their own. For example, following the Triangle Shirtwaist Factory fire, a push for factory safety standards legislation (which both Belle and Henry had helped lobby for) led Smith to co-sponsor the bill that established a Factory Investigating Commission. Belle Moskowitz's work during this election began her partnership with Smith, which lasted for over a decade.

=== Work with Al Smith ===
Smith connected with Moskowitz through her work as an industrial mediator and writer. She became one of Smith's most intimate advisors, and also worked as his publicist, and he kept her close at hand throughout his eight years as governor of New York State. Visitors would note her presence in the corner of his office during critical meetings. Witnesses reported that Smith would even defer to her on major legislative proposals, waiting for her approval before making final decisions. She advised him throughout the process of enacting broad reforms for the state of New York that would later inspire and direct Franklin Delano Roosevelt in the development of the New Deal during his presidency in 1932.

During her time working with Al Smith, Moskowitz mentored both Robert Moses and a young Anna M. Rosenberg in the art of wielding power behind the scenes.

=== Al Smith presidential campaign ===
When Smith became the Democratic Party candidate for President in 1928, Moskowitz worked as his campaign manager. In this role, she has been proposed as the first woman to manage an American presidential campaign. She later worked as his press agent during his attempt for renomination in 1932.

=== Later career ===
In 1928, following Smith's unsuccessful run for the presidency, Moskowitz opened her own public relations firm, Publicity Associates, one of the first firms independently founded by a woman.

== Personal life ==
In 1903, Belle married Charles Henry Israels (1864–1911), an artist and architect, whom she met at the Educational Alliance where he had been a volunteer club leader. They had four children, three of whom lived to adulthood: Carlos Lindner, Miriam, and Josef. Following in his mother’s career path, Josef would go on to become Ethiopian emperor Halie Selassie’s public relations counsel.

She was widowed when Charles died in 1911. Belle's second husband, Henry Moskowitz, had a Ph.D. in philosophy and was a settlement worker on the Lower East Side. They were colleagues at the Educational Alliance, and they would continue to work closely together in the investigations following the Triangle Shirtwaist Factory fire, as well as on the citizens' committee formed in the aftermath of the Rosenthal murder case in 1912. They married in 1914.

== Death ==
On December 8, 1932, Belle Moskowitz fell down the front steps of her house and, while recovering from her broken bones, died of an embolism on January 2, 1933, at age 55. She was buried in Sleepy Hollow Cemetery in Westchester County.

Moskowitz's funeral at New York's Temple Emanu-El was attended by more than 3,000 people. Rabbi Stephen S. Wise, delivering her eulogy, said that Moskowitz would "stand out in the history of American life and politics as the woman citizen never selfish and never unwise in politically pioneering days, but ever wise and effectively performing the duties of citizenship with an eye single to the truest good of the citizenship." She received condolences from many figures in New York public life, including Governor Herbert Lehman, Senator Robert Wagner, and Frances Perkins.

== Legacy ==
Edward Bernays, the “father of public relations,” considered Moskowitz a pioneer in the field; the two had a friendly rivalry over who was first to use the title “public relations counselor” to describe their professional role. He names her among a group of influential publicity figures in women’s organizations in his book Propaganda.

In 2009, the National Jewish Democratic Council gave its first "Belle Moskowitz" award to Ann Lewis.

== Bibliography ==
- Perry, Elisabeth Israels (1987). Belle Moskowitz: Feminine Politics and the Exercise of Power in the Age of Alfred E. Smith. Oxford University Press
