= Henry Moskowitz (activist) =

American civil rights activist (1880–1936)

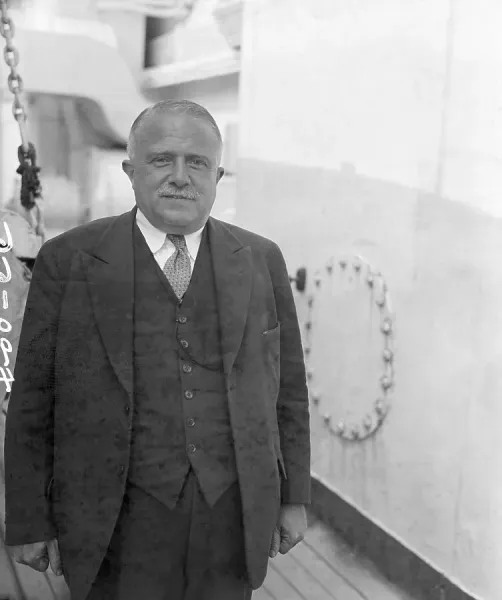
- Moskowitz in 1933
- Born: September 27, 1880; Huși, Principality of Romania
- Died: December 18, 1936 (aged 56); Manhattan, New York City, United States
- Education: University of Erlangen 1906 Ph.D.
- Spouse: Belle Moskowitz (m. 1914; died 1933)

Henry Moskowitz (September 27, 1880 – December 18, 1936) was a Romanian-American civil rights activist, and one of the co-founders of the National Association for the Advancement of Colored People.

== Biography ==
Moskowitz was born on September 27, 1880, in Huși, Romania. He was Jewish. He migrated to the United States in 1883. He attended the New York City public schools and then graduated from the City College of New York in 1899. In 1906, he earned a Ph.D. in philosophy from the University of Erlangen in Germany.

In 1914, he married Belle Lindner Israels (1877–1933). In 1914, New York City mayor John Purroy Mitchel appointed him president of the Municipal Civil Service Commission. In 1917, he served as the Commissioner of Public Markets in New York City. He was the founding Executive Director of the League of New York Theatres, which eventually became The Broadway League, the organization known for producing the Tony Awards. He was also an active leader in Theodore Roosevelt's Progressive Party.

He died on December 18, 1936, in Manhattan, New York City.

== Works ==
- Up from the City Streets: Alfred E. Smith (1927)

== Timeline ==
- 1880 Born in Huși, Romania
- 1883 Migrated from Romania to the United States
- 1898 Co-founds the Downtown Ethical Society, a settlement house
- 1899 Graduates from City College of New York
- 1906 Earned his Ph.D. in philosophy from the University of Erlangen in Germany
- 1909 Co-founds National Association for the Advancement of Colored People on February 12, 1909
- 1909 Associate leader of the Society for Ethical Culture of New York
- 1911 Investigates the Triangle Shirtwaist Factory fire
- 1912 Runs for Congress from the 12th District as a Progressive Party
- 1912 Rejects censorship in movies
- 1914 Appointed president of the Municipal Civil Service Commission
- 1914 Married Belle Lindner Israels (1877–1933)
- 1917 Commissioner of Public Markets for New York City
- 1925 Trip to Europe to observe the plight of Jews in Poland
- 1932 Director of the League of New York Theatres
- 1933 Death of wife on January 2, 1933
- 1933 Trip to Europe to observe the plight of Jews in Germany
- 1936 Death in Manhattan on December 18, 1936

== See also ==
- African-American – Jewish relations
