= Canadian Review of American Studies =

- Discipline: American Studies
- Language: English
- Edited by: Priscilla L. Walton

Publication details
- History: 1970-present
- Publisher: University of Toronto Press on behalf of the Canadian Association for American Studies with the support of Carleton University (Canada)
- Frequency: Triannual

Standard abbreviations
- ISO 4: Can. Rev. Am. Stud.

Indexing
- ISSN: 0272-2011
- LCCN: 80648806
- OCLC no.: 916114289

Links
- Journal homepage

The Canadian Review of American Studies is a triannual peer-reviewed academic journal concerning American Studies journal outside the United States. It is the only journal in Canada that deals with cross-border themes and their implications for multicultural societies. It is published by the on behalf of the Canadian Association for American Studies with the support of Carleton University.

== Abstracting and indexing ==
The journal is abstracted and indexed in:

- Academic Search Alumni Edition
- Academic Search Complete
- Academic Search Elite
- Academic Search Premier
- Academic Search Ultimate
- Advanced Placement Source
- America: History and Life
- America: History and Life with Full Text
- Arts and Humanities Citation Index
- Canadian Almanac & Directory
- Canadian Reference Centre
- China Education Publications Import & Export Corporation (CEPIEC)
- Corporate ResourceNet
- CrossRef
- Current Contents
- Current Contents—Arts and Humanities
- EJS EBSCO Electronic Journals Service
- Google Scholar
- History Reference Center
- Humanities International Complete
- Humanities International Index
- Humanities Source
- Humanities Source Ultimate
- International Bibliography of Book Reviews of Scholarly Literature on the Humanities and Social Sciences (IBR)
- International Bibliography of Periodical Literature on the Humanities and Social Sciences (IBZ)
- International Bibliography of the Social Sciences (IBSS)
- MasterFILE Complete
- MasterFILE Elite
- MasterFILE Premier
- Microsoft Academic Search
- MLA International Bibliography
- Project MUSE
- Scopus
- TOPICsearch
- Ulrich's Periodicals Directory
