= Ida Benfey Judd =

American educator, elocutionist and monologist

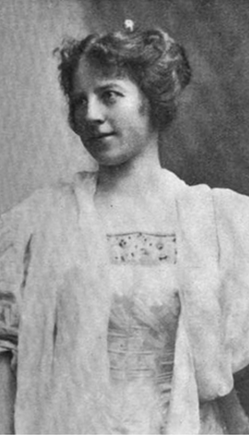
Ida Benfey, from an 1898 publication.

Ida Benfey Judd (c. 1858 – February 14, 1952) was an American educator, elocutionist, and monologist, billed as "The American Storyteller". She founded the Mark Twain Association, and was its first president.

== Early life ==
Ida Benfey was born ca. 1858-59 in Detroit, Michigan, the daughter of Delia M. and Louis Benfey. She and her older sister Myra lost their mother when they were 11 and 13 years of age, respectively. She studied elocution at the Michigan State Normal School in Ypsilanti, Michigan, and graduated from the University of California in 1883. Her sister Myra married Waldo S. Waterman, son of California governor Robert W. Waterman, in 1887 and died of consumption later that year.

== Career ==
Judd was a popular speaker at community events, schools, and in theaters, especially in New York City, where she was based, but also on national tours. Of her interpretation of The Book of Job, a signature piece in her wide repertoire, the Times noted that "Miss Benfey has taste, understanding, and uncommon powers of expression, and her new undertaking cannot fail to interest many persons." She was also known to read works by women writers; an 1896 recital included texts by Mary E. Wilkins Freeman and Ruth McEnery Stuart, with both authors in the audience. At the 1920 centennial commemoration of George Eliot held at a Columbia University, Judd performed scenes from The Mill on the Floss, accompanied by a trio of women musicians. Les Misérables and A Tale of Two Cities were other popular texts for Benfey's performances. She also told Chinese folk tales, recited Socrates, and read Mark Twain essays and stories.

Judd taught public speaking and elocution at Teachers College, Columbia University; among her students was political strategist Belle Moskowitz.

In 1926, Judd founded the Mark Twain Association, to promote the reading and study of Twain's work. She was the association's longtime president, organizing contests, raising funds, and corresponding with writers and publications. In the 1930s, she organized Great Literature Across the Footlights, to promote cultural literacy through dramatic presentation in prisons and reformatories and summer camps.

== Personal life and death ==
Ida Benfey married George W. Judd, a lawyer. She died in Ossining, New York on February 14, 1952, at the age of 93. Her papers are archived at the New York Public Library. Her Mark Twain Association was still meeting annually in New York City in 1990.
