= Robert Moses =

American urban planner (1888–1981)

- Moses in 1978

49th Secretary of State of New York
- In office January 17, 1927 – January 1, 1929
- Governor: Al Smith
- Preceded by: Florence E. S. Knapp
- Succeeded by: Edward J. Flynn

1st Chairman of the New York State Council of Parks
- In office 1924–1963
- Preceded by: Position established
- Succeeded by: Laurance Rockefeller

1st Commissioner of the New York City Department of Parks and Recreation
- In office January 19, 1934 – May 23, 1960
- Appointed by: Fiorello H. La Guardia; William O'Dwyer; Vincent R. Impellitteri; Robert F. Wagner Jr.
- Preceded by: Position established
- Succeeded by: Newbold Morris

Personal details
- Born: December 18, 1888 New Haven, Connecticut, U.S.
- Died: July 29, 1981 (aged 92) West Islip, New York, U.S.
- Resting place: Woodlawn Cemetery
- Party: Republican
- Spouses: Mary Sims (m. 1915; died 1966); Mary Alicia Grady (m. 1966)
- Children: 2
- Education: Yale University (BA); Wadham College, Oxford (BA, MA); Columbia University (PhD)

Robert Moses (December 18, 1888 – July 29, 1981) was an American urban planner and public official who worked in the New York metropolitan area during the early to mid-20th century. Moses is regarded as one of the most powerful and influential people in the history of New York City and the state of New York. Moses's construction projects transformed the New York area and revolutionized the way urban areas across the United States were designed and built. His philosophy of urban development influenced a generation of engineers, architects, and urban planners across the United States.

Never elected to any office, Moses held myriad positions throughout his more-than-40-year career including New York City Parks Commissioner and chairman of the Long Island State Park Commission. At various points, Moses held as many as 12 titles simultaneously. Working closely with New York governor Al Smith early in his career, Moses became an expert in writing laws and influencing the operations of state government.

As head of the Triborough Bridge Authority, Moses was instrumental in the construction of major transportation arteries including the Cross Bronx Expressway, the Brooklyn-Queens Expressway, and the Long Island Expressway, as well as major crossings and transportation infrastructure projects such as the Triborough Bridge, the Verrazzano-Narrows Bridge, the Bronx-Whitestone Bridge, the Throgs Neck Bridge, the Brooklyn-Battery Tunnel, and the Queens-Midtown Tunnel. These highways, roadways, and bridges, alongside other urban renewal efforts, often sacrificed large swaths of low-income housing and replaced them with public housing projects.

As President of the Long Island State Park Commission, Moses oversaw the construction of Jones Beach State Park, the most visited public beach in the United States, and was the primary architect of the New York State Parkway System.

Moses wielded enormous power as he had near-complete control of tolls collected on the various bridge, tunnel, and roadway projects, which he then used to fund additional projects.

Moses's reputation declined throughout the 1960s and 1970s, in part because of his plan for a Lower Manhattan Expressway, which would have significantly changed the shape and character of SoHo and the Lower East Side. Community activists, notably Jane Jacobs, and elected officials began to cast doubt over the purported benefits of many of Moses's projects. Robert Caro's Pulitzer Prize-winning biography The Power Broker (1974) further characterized Moses's practices as controlling, overly focused on car dependency, and having a disproportionately negative effect on poor and minority communities. In large part because of The Power Broker, Moses has come to be regarded as a controversial figure in the history of New York City, New York State, and the urban planning field.

== Early life ==
Moses was born in New Haven, Connecticut, on December 18, 1888, to Isabella "Bella" (née Cohen) and Emanuel Moses. His parents, of German Jewish descent, were adherents of the Ethical Culture Movement who raised Moses in a secular environment; he was uncircumcised and did not have a bar mitzvah. He became an Episcopalian after college, and did not identify as Jewish. Moses spent the first nine years of his life living at 83 Dwight Street in New Haven, two blocks from Yale University. In 1897, the Moses family moved to New York City, where they lived on East 46th Street off Fifth Avenue. Moses's father was a successful department store owner and real estate speculator in New Haven. To make this move, Moses's father sold his real estate assets and store, and then retired. Moses's mother was active in the settlement movement, with her own love of buildings. Robert Moses and his brother Paul attended several schools for their elementary and secondary education, including the Dwight School, the Mohegan Lake School, and a military academy near Peekskill.

After graduating from Yale College (B.A., 1909) and Wadham College, Oxford (B.A., Jurisprudence, 1911; M.A., 1913), Moses earned a Ph.D. in political science from Columbia University in 1914 with a dissertation titled The Civil Service of Great Britain. He subsequently became attracted to New York City reform politics.

In 1914, John Purroy Mitchel announced his intentions to clean up the civil service in New York City. He selected Henry Moskowitz and Darwin R. James for the three-member Municipal Civil Service Commission, who then chose Moses, at the time working for the Bureau of Municipal Research, as the third member due to his understanding of civil service, assigning him ten assistants. Moses suggested a reform of the city's efficiency-rating system as the first step. On 8 July 1915, after nineteen months of work, Moses mailed Commissioner James the draft of the report he had prepared: Detailed Report on the Rating of the Efficiency of Civil Service Employees, Excepting Members of the Uniformed Forces in the Police and Fire Services and in the Lower Ranks of the Street Cleaning Service. The system at the time had department heads simply reporting "C" or average to every other employees on their "report cards" and hence it provided them with less information. He suggested a more precise system, where all government service was divided into 16 categories, each category divided into specific jobs, each job scientifically analyzed to show its "functions" and "responsibilities", each of which could be assigned a mathematical weight corresponding to its importance in the overall job. On the basis of performance evaluated through this system, would promotions and demotions happen even allowing the downgrading of seniority. It would also put a bar on future promotions. This report led to backlash from the workers in form of protest meetings. Tammany Hall very likely played a role in this backlash since their control over the civil service was based on cronyism, in contrast to meritocracy which the new system promoted. Even Henry Moskowitz asked for a compromise in the system, by allowing it to gradually assimilate and apply to the vacant positions as they would arise. Moses fought against this compromise. Finally in 1917, even Mitchel did not back Moses's system in front of Board of Estimate and his system was not adopted.

In 1915, Moses married Mary Louise Sims of Dodgeville, Wisconsin. They had two daughters, Barbara Olds and Jane Rose Moses Collins. Mary Sims Moses, who had remained virtually bedridden in their home from 1952–1966 with arthritis, died on September 6, 1966. Moses subsequently married his secretary Mary Alicia Grady on October 4, 1966. They lived in Manhattan's Gracie Terrace. Grady died in 1993.

== Career ==
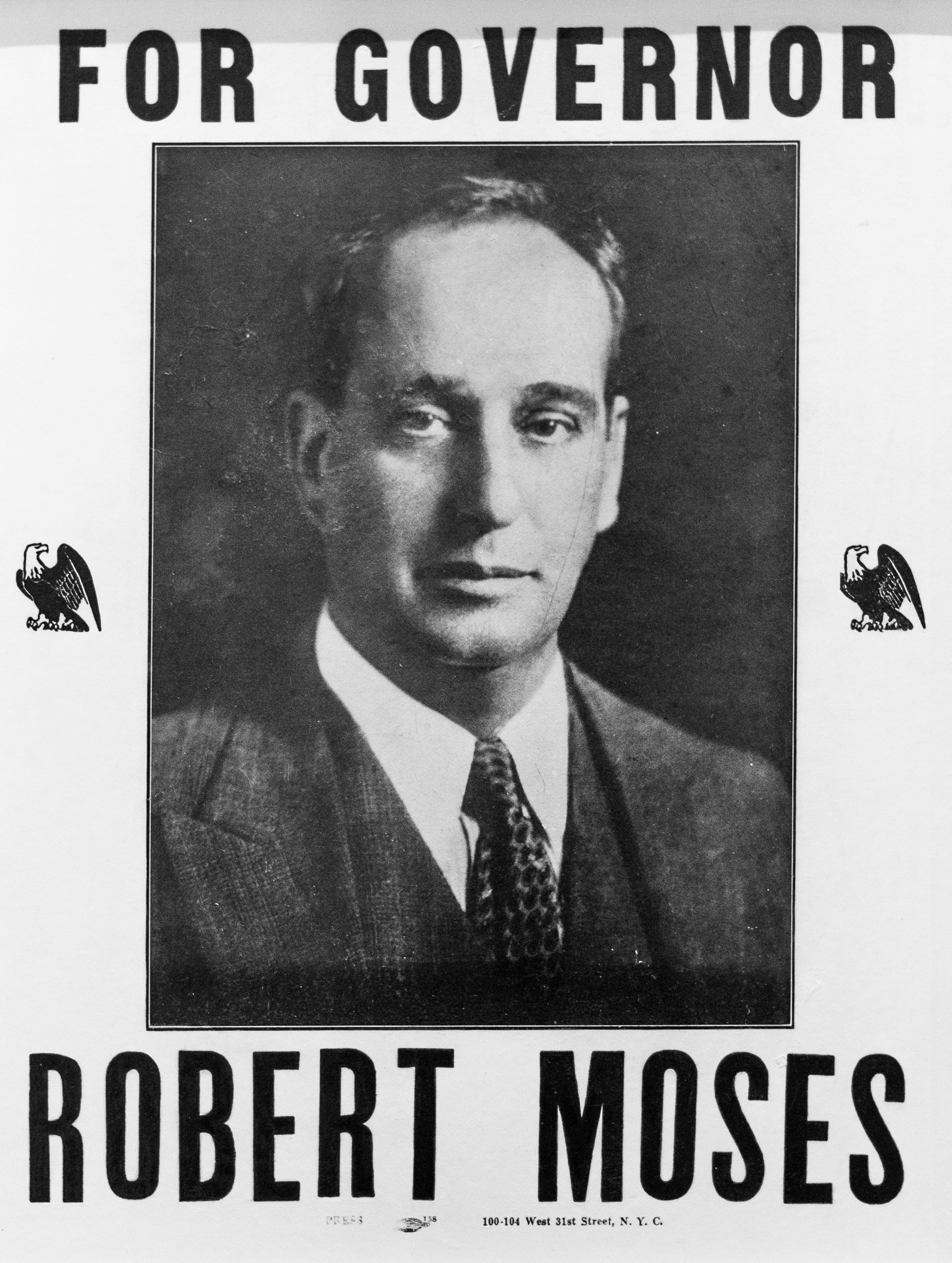
1934 campaign poster

In 1918, via his mother's association with the Madison House settlement house, Moses drew the attention of Belle Moskowitz, a friend and trusted advisor to Governor-elect Al Smith. When the office of secretary of state of New York became appointive rather than elective, Smith appointed Moses, who served in the post from 1927 to 1929. Moses himself ran for governor in 1934. He was the Republican nominee against Democratic incumbent Herbert H. Lehman, but was defeated by Lehman in a landslide. After his loss to Lehman, Moses never ran for public office again.

Moses rose to power with Smith, who was elected as governor in 1918, and then again in 1922. With Smith's support, Moses set in motion a sweeping consolidation of the New York State government. During that period Moses began his first foray into large-scale public work initiatives, while drawing on Smith's political power to enact legislation. This helped create the new Long Island State Park Commission and the State Council of Parks. In 1924, Governor Smith appointed Moses chairman of the State Council of Parks and president of the Long Island State Park Commission. Displaying a strong command of law as well as matters of engineering, Moses became known for his skill in drafting legislation, and was called "the best bill drafter in Albany". At a time when the public was accustomed to Tammany Hall corruption and incompetence, Moses was seen as a savior of government.

Shortly after President Franklin D. Roosevelt's inauguration in 1933, the federal government found itself with millions of New Deal dollars to spend, yet states and cities had few projects ready. Moses was one of the few local officials who had projects shovel ready. For that reason, New York City was able to obtain significant Works Progress Administration (WPA), Civilian Conservation Corps (CCC), and other Depression-era funding. One of his most influential and longest-lasting positions was that of New York City Parks Commissioner, which he held from January 18, 1934, to May 23, 1960.

=== Offices held ===
The many offices and professional titles that Moses held gave him unusually broad power to shape urban development in the New York metropolitan region. These include, according to the New York Preservation Archive Project:

- Long Island State Park Commission (President, 1924–1963)
- New York State Council of Parks (Chairman, 1924–1963)
- New York Secretary of State (1927–1929)
- Bethpage State Park Authority (President, 1933–1963)
- Emergency Public Works Commission (Chairman, 1933–1934)
- Jones Beach Parkway Authority (President, 1933–1963)
- New York City Department of Parks (Commissioner, 1934–1960)
- Triborough Bridge and Tunnel Authority (Chairman, 1934–1968)
- New York City Planning Commission (Commissioner, 1942–1960)
- New York State Power Authority (Chairman, 1954–1962)
- New York World's Fair (President, 1960–1966)
- Staff of the Governor of New York (Housing Advisor, 1974–1975)

== Influence ==
"Robert Moses shaped a city and its sprawling suburbs - and, to an extent that would have astonished analysts of urban trends had they measured the implications of his decades of handiwork, influenced the destiny of all the cities of twentieth-century America"

— Robert A. Caro

=== Roadways ===
Over four decades, Moses conceived, funded, and built a network of highways and parkways that reoriented the region around the car, connecting New York's outer boroughs, opening Long Island to mass suburbanization, and establishing the template for urban highway design that cities across the country would follow.

His earliest and most enduring contribution was the Long Island parkway system, begun in the 1920s under Governor Al Smith. The Northern State Parkway, Southern State Parkway, and Wantagh State Parkway were among the first limited-access roadways in the United States, designed not merely as transportation corridors but as landscaped recreational drives intended to carry New York City residents to the beaches and parks Moses was simultaneously building at their terminus points.

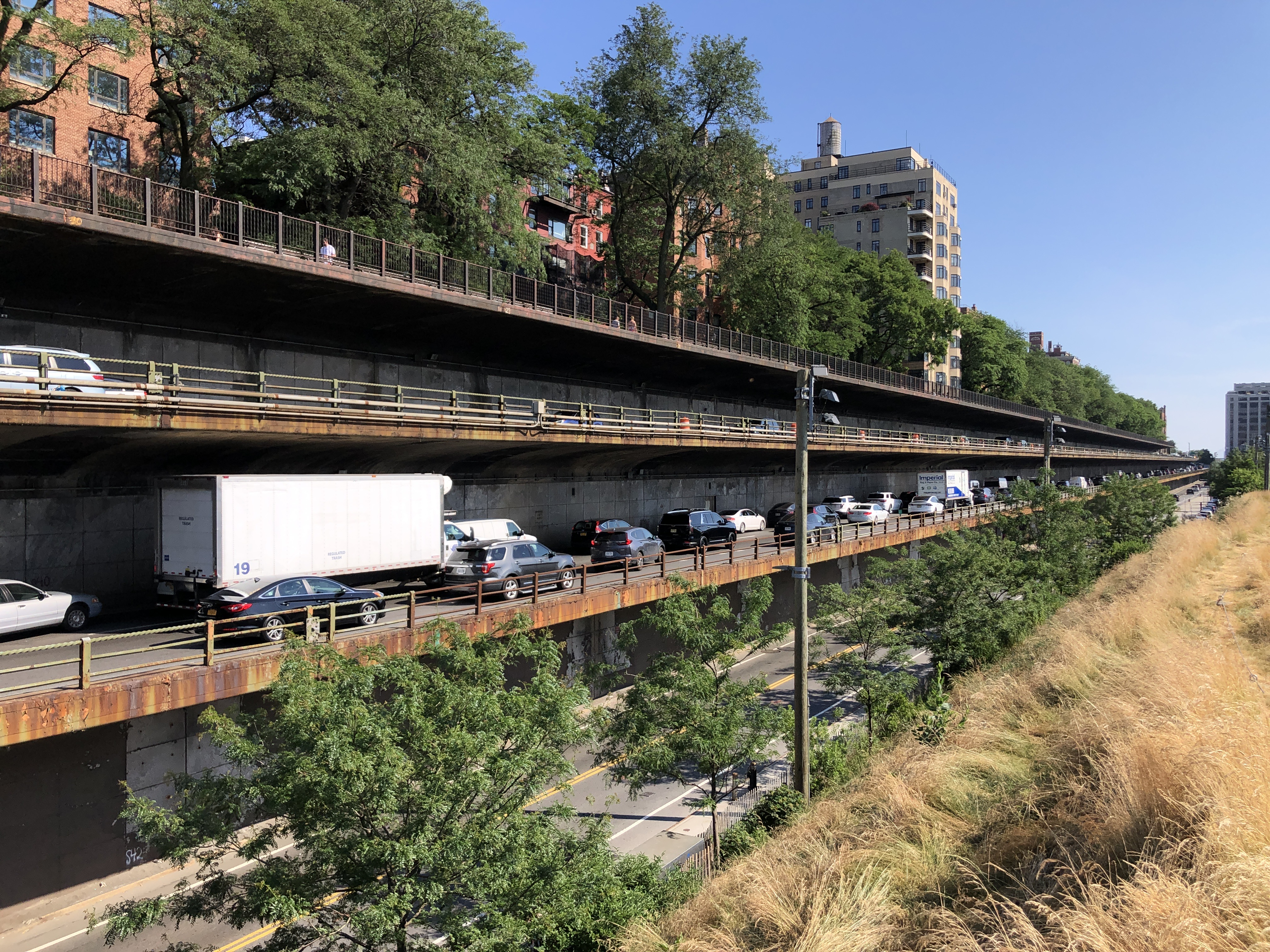
The BQE cantilevered section in 2024, seen from Brooklyn Bridge Park

The Cross Bronx Expressway, completed in 1963, was among the most consequential and controversial public works projects in American history, cutting a mile-wide swath through the densely populated neighborhoods of the South Bronx. The Brooklyn-Queens Expressway ("BQE") carved through established neighborhoods in Brooklyn, its notorious cantilevered section running along the Brooklyn waterfront. The Long Island Expressway extended automobile access deep into Nassau and Suffolk counties, accelerating the postwar suburban boom. The Staten Island Expressway and the Bruckner Expressway completed the city grid.

Moses also built or significantly expanded the Henry Hudson Parkway along the Hudson River from lower Manhattan to the Bronx, the Belt Parkway, encircling the southern edge of Brooklyn and Queens, and the Meadowbrook and Bethpage State Parkways extending Moses's original Long Island system.

=== Bridges and tunnels ===
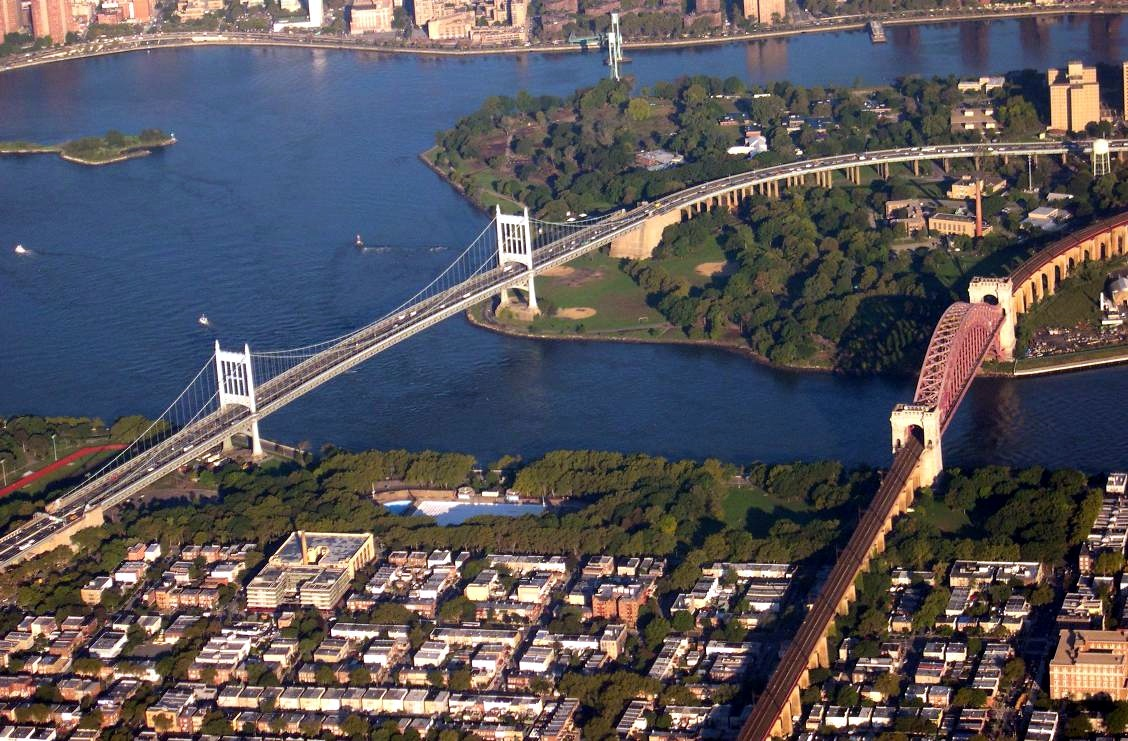
Part of the Triborough Bridge (left) with Astoria Park and its pool in the center

Although Moses had power over the construction of all New York City Housing Authority public housing projects and headed many other entities, it was his chairmanship of the Triborough Bridge Authority that gave him the most power. His bridges and tunnels created an economic engine whereby bridge revenues, collected through the Triborough Bridge Authority, became the financial engine that would fund much of the broader overall construction program.

==== Bridges ====
The Triborough Bridge (later renamed the Robert F. Kennedy Bridge) opened in 1936, connecting the Bronx, Manhattan, and Queens via three separate spans. Language in its Authority's bond contracts and multi-year Commissioner appointments made it largely impervious to pressure from mayors and governors. While New York City and New York State were perpetually strapped for money, the bridge's toll revenues amounted to tens of millions of dollars a year. The Authority was thus able to raise hundreds of millions of dollars by selling bonds, a method also used by the Port Authority of New York and New Jersey to fund large public construction projects. Toll revenues rose quickly as traffic on the bridges exceeded all projections. Rather than pay off the bonds, Moses used the revenue to build other toll projects, a cycle that would feed on itself.

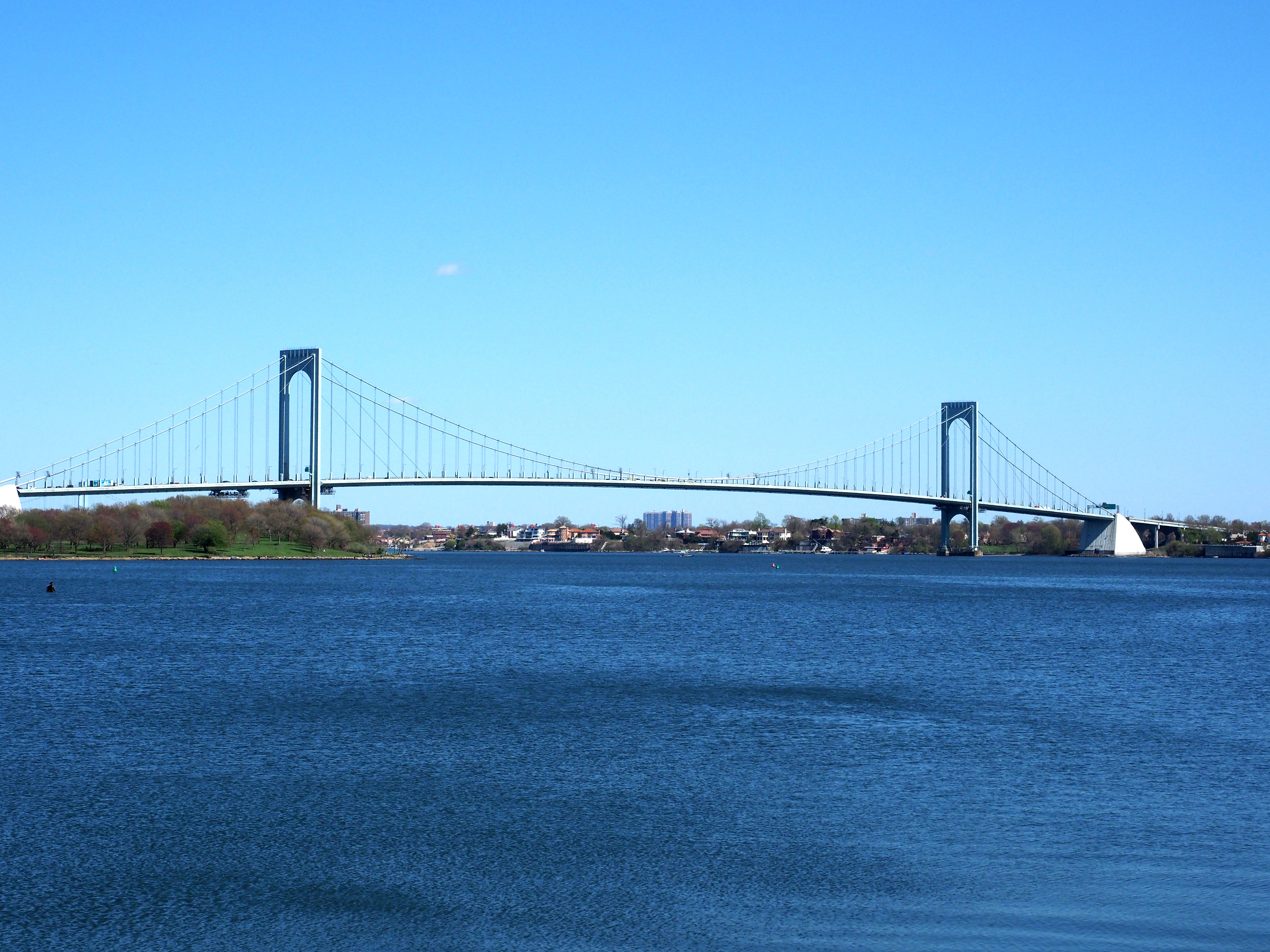
Bronx Whitestone Bridge

The Bronx-Whitestone Bridge opened in 1939 and provided a second crossing between Queens and the Bronx. It connected the Grand Central Parkway to the Hutchinson River Parkway and extended Moses's project reach into Westchester County and beyond. Elegant in its design—the work of engineer Othmar Ammann—it has been called one of the most beautiful suspension bridges in the world.

The Throgs Neck Bridge opened in 1961 and became the easternmost crossing between Queens and the Bronx. It provided a parallel route to the Whitestone and connected directly to the Cross Bronx and New England Thruway interchange.

The Verrazzano-Narrows Bridge, opened in 1964 and Moses's last great project, connected Brooklyn to Staten Island across the mouth of New York Harbor. At the time of its opening it was the longest suspension bridge in the world. It was also the anchor point for the Staten Island Expressway, completing the final link in Moses's five-borough highway network and triggering the rapid suburbanization of Staten Island that followed.

The Henry Hudson Bridge, a lesser-known but strategically critical crossing, connected the Henry Hudson Parkway in Manhattan to the Bronx, completing the parkway's unbroken run from lower Manhattan north into Westchester.

==== Tunnels ====
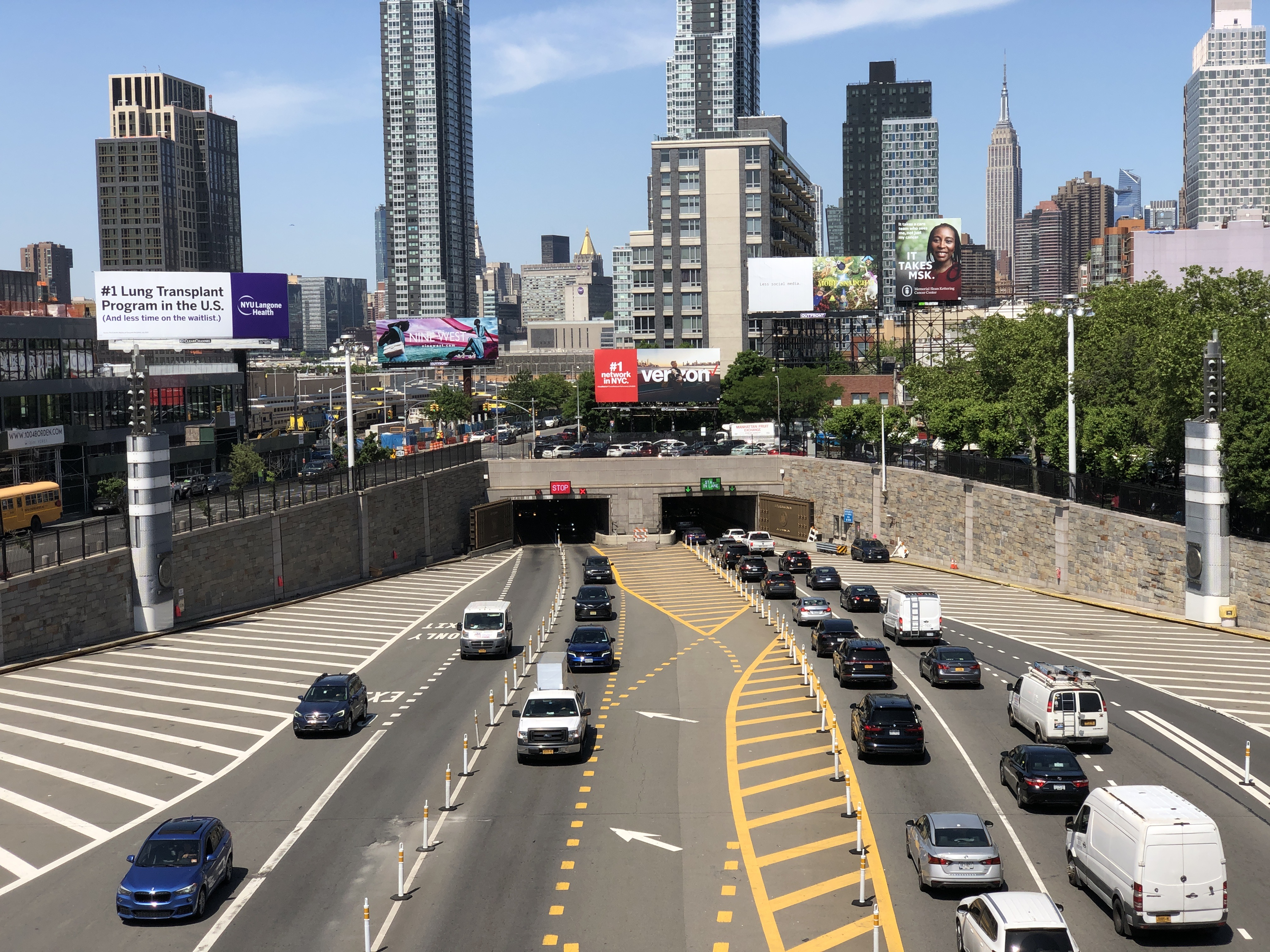
Midtown Tunnel: Queens Entrance

The Queens-Midtown Tunnel, like the Brooklyn Battery Tunnel, was initially opposed by Moses until through political maneuvering he gained control of it, and the revenue it generated. The tunnel opened in 1940 and connected Midtown Manhattan to Queens. This provided relieved pressure on the existing East River bridges and tied directly into the Long Island Expressway corridor, creating the first non-bridged roadway link between Long Island and Manhattan.

The Brooklyn-Battery Tunnel, later renamed the Hugh L. Carey Tunnel, opened in 1950, was the more consequential and more contested of the two. Moses had originally proposed a bridge at the same location, a span feared to have been visually catastrophic for the harbor. The tunnel alternative was ultimately imposed over Moses's objections, largely through the intervention of the War Department, which cited access concerns to the Brooklyn Navy Yard. Today it remains the longest continuous underwater vehicular tunnel in North America. At its Brooklyn end it connected directly to the Gowanus Expressway and the broader Brooklyn highway network; at its Manhattan end it fed into the Battery Park approach and the lower Manhattan street grid.

==== Unbuilt Brooklyn–Battery bridge ====
In the late 1930s a municipal controversy raged over whether an additional vehicular link between Brooklyn and Lower Manhattan should be built as a bridge or a tunnel. Bridges can be wider and cheaper to build, but taller and longer bridges use more ramp space at landfall than tunnels do. A "Brooklyn Battery Bridge" would have decimated Battery Park and physically encroached on the financial district, and for this reason, the bridge was opposed by the Regional Plan Association, historical preservationists, Wall Street financial interests, property owners, various high society people, construction unions, the Manhattan borough president, Mayor Fiorello LaGuardia, and governor Herbert H. Lehman. Despite this, Moses favored a bridge, which he falsely claimed could both carry more automobile traffic and serve as a higher visibility monument than a tunnel. In truth, through engineering studies, both could carry similar amount of traffic except a bridge would lose capacity during winter time due to snow and ice. LaGuardia and Lehman as usual had little money to spend, in part due to the Great Depression, while the federal government was running low on funds after recently spending $105 million ($2 billion in 2026) on the Queens-Midtown Tunnel and other City projects and refused to provide any additional funds to New York. Awash in funds from Triborough Bridge tolls, Moses deemed that money could only be spent on a bridge. He also clashed with the chief engineer of the project, Ole Singstad, who preferred a tunnel instead of a bridge.

Only a lack of a key federal approval thwarted the bridge project. President Roosevelt ordered the War Department to assert that bombing a bridge in that location would block East River access to the Brooklyn Navy Yard upstream. Thwarted, Moses retaliated by dismantling the New York Aquarium on Castle Clinton and moving it to Coney Island in Brooklyn, where it grew much bigger. This was in apparent retaliation, based on specious claims that the proposed tunnel would undermine Castle Clinton's foundation. He also attempted to raze Castle Clinton itself, the historic fort surviving only after being transferred to the federal government. Moses now had no other option for a trans-river crossing than to build a tunnel. He commissioned the Brooklyn–Battery Tunnel (now officially the Hugh L. Carey Tunnel), connecting Brooklyn to Lower Manhattan. A 1941 publication from the Triborough Bridge and Tunnel Authority claimed that the government had forced them to build a tunnel at "twice the cost, twice the operating fees, twice the difficulty to engineer, and half the traffic," although engineering studies did not support these conclusions, and a tunnel may have held many of the advantages Moses publicly tried to attach to the bridge option.

This had not been the first time Moses pressed for a bridge over a tunnel. He had tried to upstage the Tunnel Authority when the Queens-Midtown Tunnel was being planned. He had raised the same arguments, which failed due to their lack of political support.

=== Parks and beaches ===
Moses transformed New York's public recreational landscape from a patchwork of spaces into a system of regional parks, beaches, and playgrounds that gave millions of New Yorkers access to open space and shoreline that had previously been primarily the province of the wealthy.

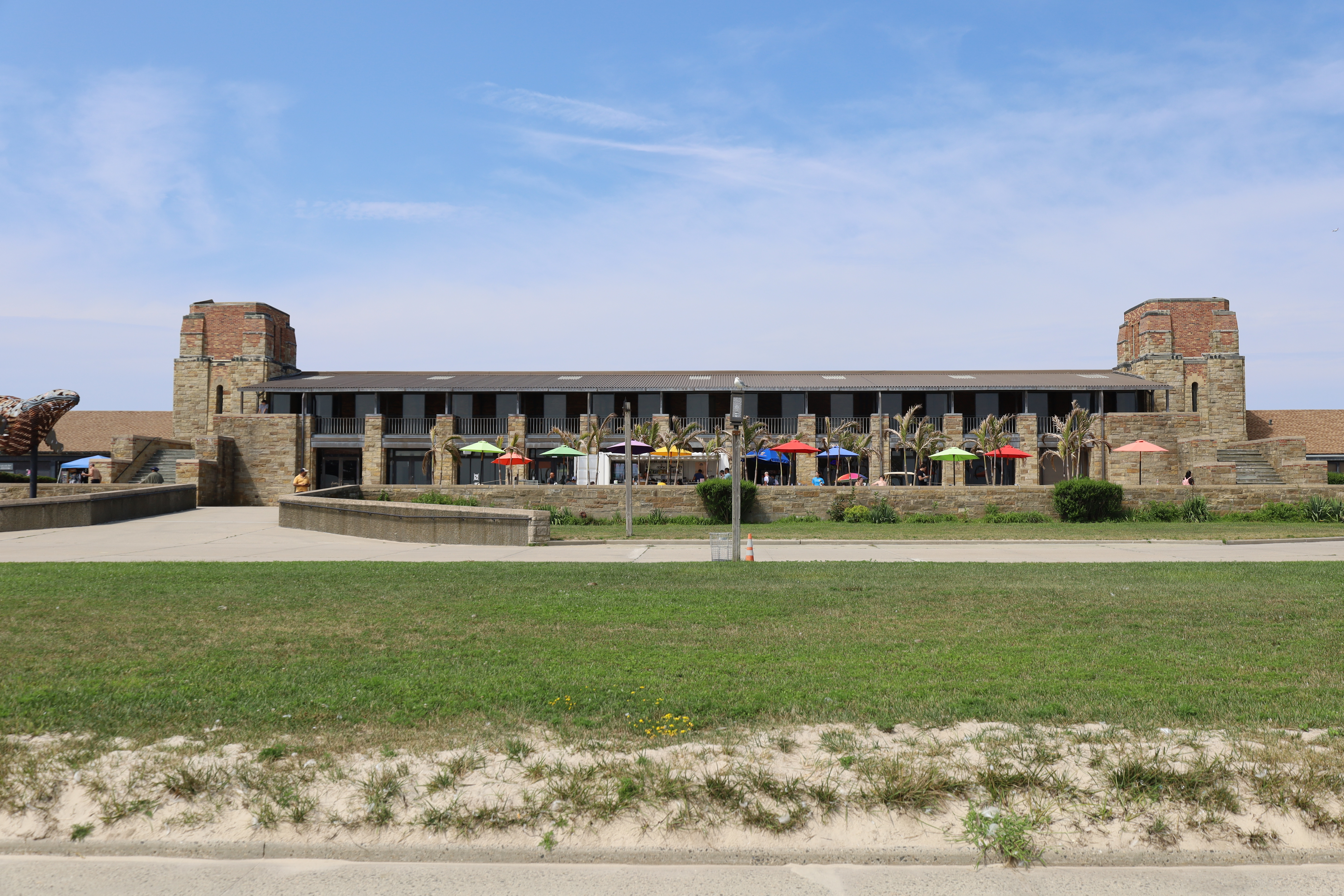
Jones Beach East Bathhouse

Jones Beach State Park, which opened in 1929 on a barrier island off the south shore of Long Island, was Moses's masterpiece, a public beach facility. Moses created the island it sits on, then built the causeways and parkways that made it accessible by car. The facilities Moses built there - the bathhouses, the water tower modeled on a Venetian campanile - the boardwalk, the theaters, were designed to a standard of architectural quality and civic ambition that met with praise. Jones Beach remains the most popular and heavily visited beach on the East Coast, with an estimated eight million visitors in 2025.

Beyond Jones Beach, Moses developed an entire system of Long Island state parks: Sunken Meadow, Caumsett, Bethpage, Hither Hills, and others, all connected by the parkway network he was simultaneously building. Robert Moses State Park, at the western tip of Fire Island, bears his name.

In New York City, Moses rebuilt or significantly expanded nearly every major park in the system including Central Park, Prospect Park, Riverside Park, Pelham Bay Park, and Flushing Meadows-Corona Park which Moses developed twice, first for the 1939 World's Fair and again for the 1964 World's Fair.

Orchard Beach in the Bronx was Moses's creation. He dredged and deposited the sand, built the crescent-shaped beach, and connected it to the Hutchinson River Parkway.

==== WPA swimming pools ====
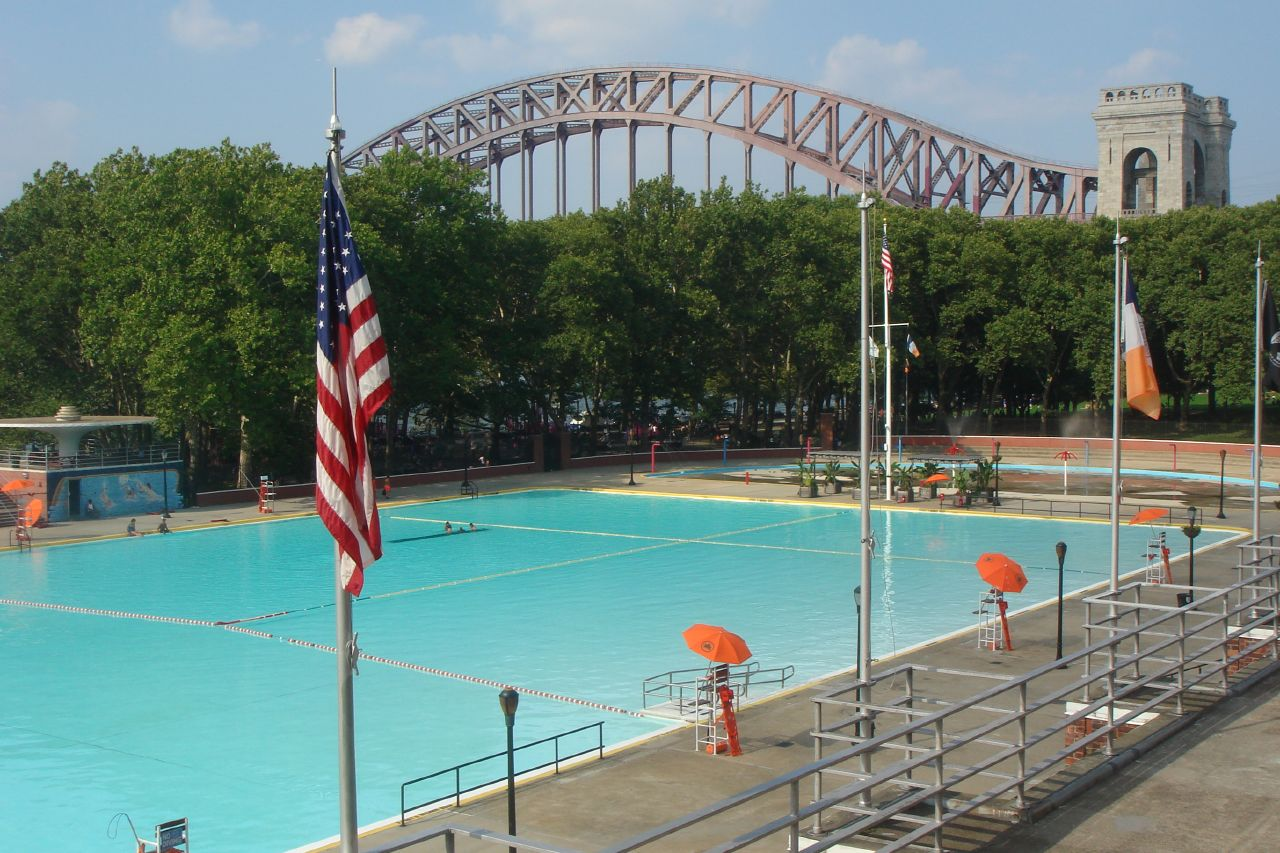
Astoria Park Pool

During the Depression, Moses, along with Mayor Fiorello H. La Guardia, was especially interested in creating new pools and other bathing facilities, such as those in Jacob Riis Park, Jones Beach, and Orchard Beach. He devised a list of 23 pools around the city. The pools would be built using funds from the Works Progress Administration (WPA), a federal agency created as part of the New Deal to combat the Depression's negative effects.

Eleven of these pools were to be designed concurrently and open in 1936. These comprised ten pools at Astoria Park, Betsy Head Park, Crotona Park, Hamilton Fish Park, Highbridge Park, Thomas Jefferson Park, McCarren Park, Red Hook Park, Jackie Robinson Park, and Sunset Park, as well as a standalone facility at Tompkinsville Pool. Moses, along with architects Aymar Embury II and Gilmore David Clarke, created a common design for these proposed aquatic centers. Each location was to have distinct pools for diving, swimming, and wading; bleachers and viewing areas; and bathhouses with locker rooms that could be used as gymnasiums. The pools were to have several common features, such as a minimum 55-yard (50 m) length, underwater lighting, heating, filtration, and low-cost construction materials. To fit the requirement for cheap materials, each building would be built using elements of the Streamline Moderne and Classical architectural styles. The buildings would also be near "comfort stations", additional playgrounds, and spruced-up landscapes.

Construction for some of the 11 pools began in October 1934. By mid-1936, ten of the eleven WPA-funded pools were completed and were being opened at a rate of one per week. Combined, the facilities could accommodate 49,000 swimmers. The eleven WPA pools were considered for New York City landmark status in 1990. Ten of the pools were designated as New York City landmarks in 2007 and 2008.

Moses allegedly fought to keep African American swimmers out of his pools and beaches. One subordinate remembers Moses saying the pools should be kept a few degrees colder, allegedly because Moses believed African Americans did not like cold water. Caro alleged that Moses built low bridges across his parkways to make them inaccessible to buses, thereby restricting "the use of state parks by poor and lower-middle-class families" who did not own cars. However, both the pool and bridge claims have been challenged as fabrications by other authors.

=== Public housing and urban renewal ===
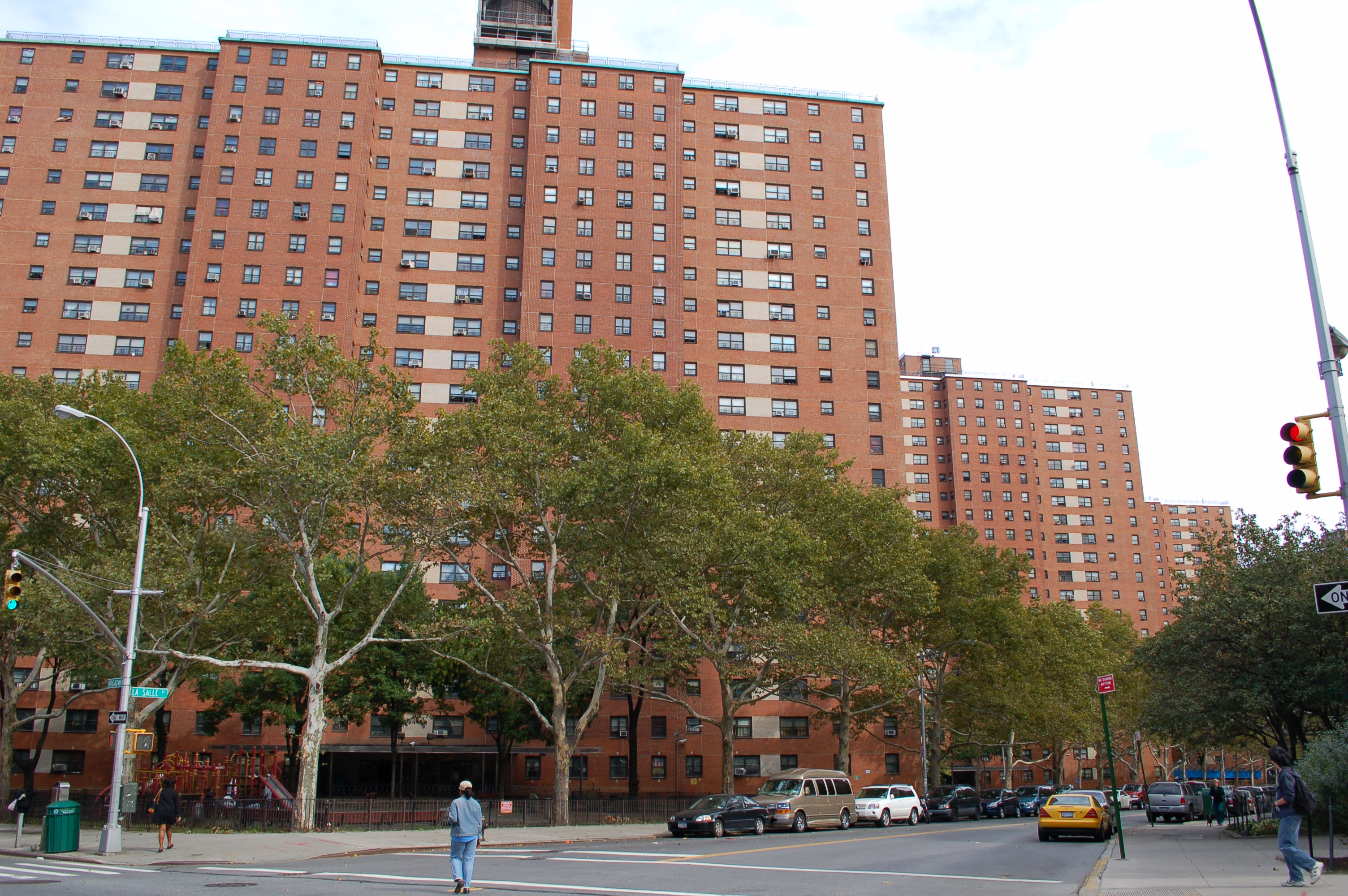
Riis Houses in 2008

As chairman of the Mayor's Slum Clearance Committee, and as City Construction Coordinator, Moses employed Title I of the Federal Urban Renewal Program to become the dominant force in determining which neighborhoods would be cleared and what would replace them. In the seven years after the war, it was estimated that some 170,000 people had been evicted from their homes in New York City for public projects—mainly Robert Moses public projects.

The projects Moses built or initiated included some of the largest public housing developments in the country. Manhattanville Houses and Grant Houses rose in West Harlem. The Jacob Riis Houses and Lillian Wald Houses were built on the Lower East Side. Washington Houses went up in East Harlem. In the Bronx, a succession of developments followed the corridor cleared by the Cross Bronx Expressway.

Title I provided federal funding for cities to acquire and clear "blighted" land, which could then be transferred to private developers or used for public housing. Moses controlled the designation of blight in New York—a power whose scope was effectively unreviewable—and used it to clear vast swaths of neighborhoods in Manhattan, Brooklyn, and the Bronx. The communities displaced were disproportionately poor, black and Hispanic.

What Moses built on the cleared land were the "Towers-in-the-park" type projects that still define large sections of the city's landscape. Departing from the traditional street grid, these developments erected tall residential towers on "superblocks" that eliminated the streets, small businesses, and sidewalk life that had characterized the neighborhoods they replaced.

=== Post-war influence of urban development and projects ===
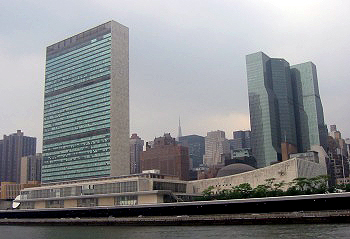
The headquarters of the United Nations in New York City, viewed from the East River. The Secretariat Building is on the left and the General Assembly Building is the low structure to the right of the tower. This set of buildings straddles the FDR Drive, another of Moses's creations.

Moses's power increased after Mayor LaGuardia retired in 1946 and a series of successors consented to almost all of his proposals. Named city "construction coordinator" that year by Mayor William O'Dwyer, Moses became New York City's de facto representative in Washington. He was also given powers over public housing that had eluded him under LaGuardia. When O'Dwyer was forced to resign in disgrace and was succeeded by Vincent R. Impellitteri, Moses was able to assume even greater behind-the-scenes control over infrastructure projects. One of Moses's first steps after Impellitteri took office was halting the creation of a citywide Comprehensive Zoning Plan underway since 1938 that would have curtailed his nearly unlimited power to build within the city and removed the Zoning Commissioner from power in the process. Moses was also empowered as the sole authority to negotiate in Washington for New York City projects. By 1959, he had overseen construction of 28,000 apartment units on hundreds of acres of land. In clearing the land for high-rises in accordance with the towers in the park concept, which at that time was seen as innovative and beneficial by leaving more grassy areas between high-rises, Moses sometimes destroyed almost as many housing units as he built.

From the 1930s to the 1960s, Robert Moses was responsible for the construction of the Triborough, Marine Parkway, Throgs Neck, Bronx-Whitestone, Henry Hudson, and Verrazzano–Narrows bridges. His other projects included the Brooklyn-Queens Expressway and Staten Island Expressway (together constituting most of Interstate 278); the Cross-Bronx Expressway; many New York State parkways; and other highways. Federal interest had shifted from parkway to freeway systems, and the new roads mostly conformed to the new vision, lacking the landscaping or the commercial traffic restrictions of the pre-war highways. He was the mover behind Shea Stadium and Lincoln Center, and contributed to the United Nations headquarters. On November 25, 1950, Governor Thomas E. Dewey appointed Moses along with former Secretary of War Robert P. Patterson and former New York State Supreme Court Justice Charles C. Lockwood as a member of the Temporary Long Island Railroad Commission, installed after the Richmond Hill train crash on November 22, 1950, that claimed 79 lives. The Commission recommended the state purchase and operation by non-profit public authority of the railway service.

Moses had influence outside the New York area as well. Public officials in many smaller U.S. cities hired him to design road and highway networks in the 1940s and early 1950s. For example, Portland, Oregon hired Moses in 1943; his plan included a loop around the city center, with spurs running through neighborhoods. Of this plan, only I-405, its links with I-5, and the Fremont Bridge were built.

Moses himself did not drive an automobile. Moses's highways in the first half of the 20th century were parkways—curving, landscaped "ribbon parks" that were intended to be pleasures to travel on, as well as "lungs for the city". However, post–World War II economic expansion, and notion of the automotive city, led to the creation of freeways, most notably in the form of the vast, federally funded Interstate Highway network.

==== Brooklyn Dodgers ====
When the owner of the Brooklyn Dodgers, Walter O'Malley, sought to replace the outdated and dilapidated Ebbets Field, he proposed building a new stadium near the Long Island Rail Road on the corner of Atlantic Avenue and Flatbush Avenue (at the current site of the Atlantic Terminal Mall, across from the Barclays Center, home of the NBA's Brooklyn Nets). O'Malley urged Moses to help him secure the property through eminent domain, but Moses refused, having already decided to build a parking garage on the site. Moreover, O'Malley's proposal—to have the city acquire the property for several times as much as he had originally said he was willing to pay—was rejected by both pro- and anti-Moses officials, newspapers, and the public, as an unacceptable government subsidy of a private business enterprise.

Moses envisioned New York's newest stadium being built in Queens' Flushing Meadows on the former (and as it turned out, future) site of the World's Fair, where it would eventually host all three of the city's major league teams of the day. O'Malley vehemently opposed that plan, citing the team's Brooklyn identity. Moses refused to budge and, after the 1957 season, the Dodgers left for Los Angeles and the New York Giants left for San Francisco. Moses was later able to build the 55,000-seat multi-purpose Shea Stadium on the site. Construction ran from October 1961 to its delayed completion in April 1964. The stadium attracted an expansion franchise, the New York Mets, who played at Shea until 2008, when the stadium was demolished and replaced with Citi Field. The NFL's New York Jets also played its home games at Shea from 1964 until 1983, after which the team moved its home games to the Meadowlands Sports Complex in New Jersey.

=== End of the Moses era ===
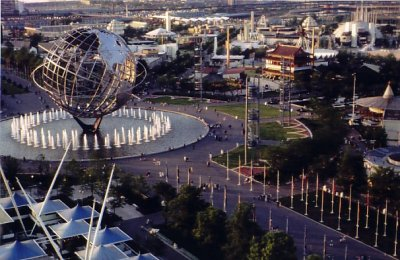
View of the 1964–1965 New York World's Fair as seen from the observation towers of the New York State pavilion. The Fair's symbol, the Unisphere, is the central image.

Moses's reputation began to fade during the 1960s. Around this time, Moses's political acumen began to fail him, as he unwisely picked several controversial political battles he could not possibly win. For example, his campaign against the free Shakespeare in the Park program received much negative publicity, and his effort to destroy a shaded playground in Central Park to make way for a parking lot for the expensive Tavern-on-the-Green restaurant earned him many enemies among the middle-class voters of the Upper West Side.

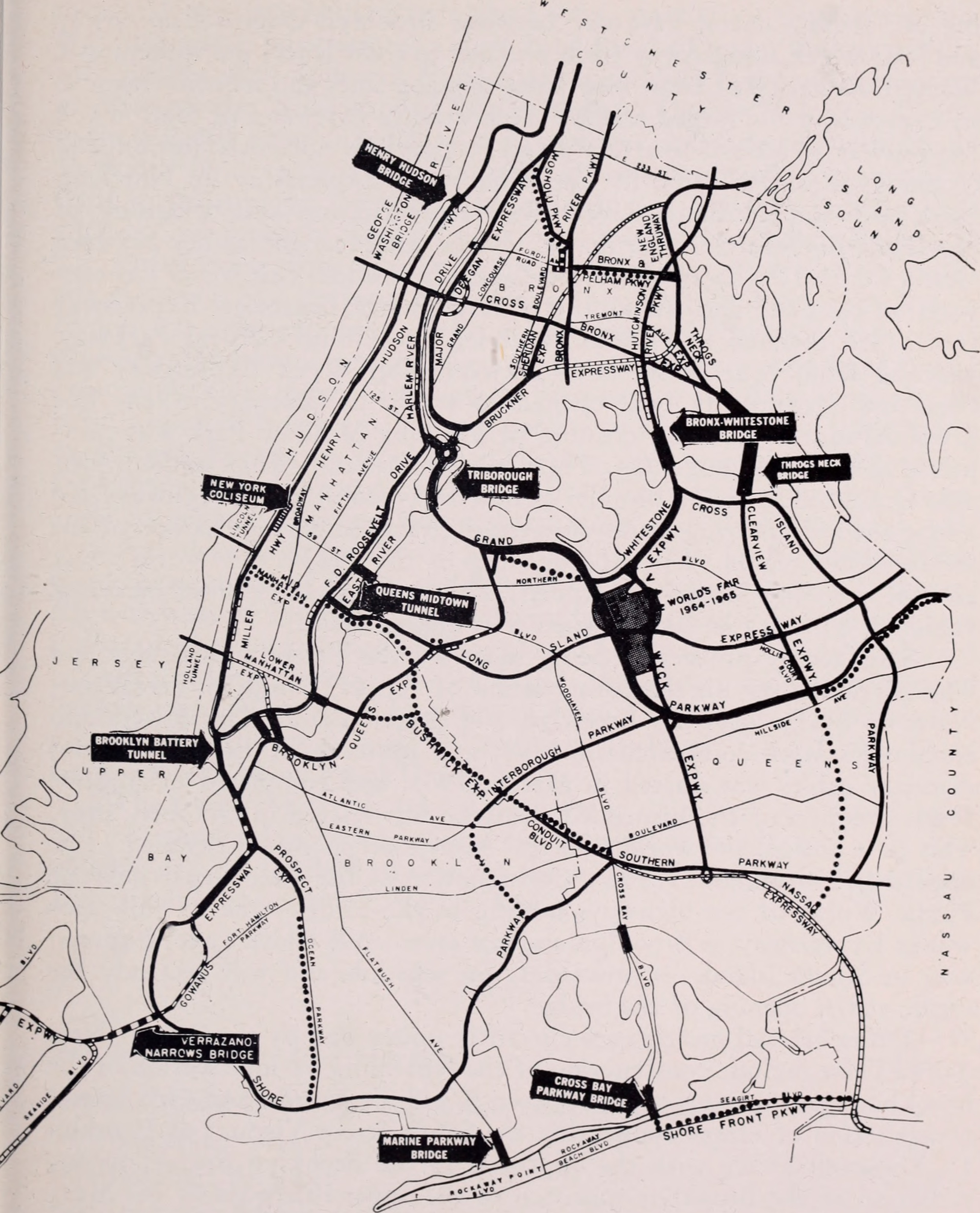
A 1964 Parks Department map showing numerous Robert Moses projects, including several highways that went unbuilt or were only partially completed.

The opposition reached a climax over the demolition of Pennsylvania Station, which many attributed to the "development scheme" mentality cultivated by Moses even though it was the impoverished Pennsylvania Railroad that was actually responsible for the demolition. This casual destruction of one of New York's greatest architectural landmarks helped prompt many city residents to turn against Moses's plans to build a Lower Manhattan Expressway, which would have gone through Greenwich Village and what is now SoHo. This plan and the Mid-Manhattan Expressway both failed politically. One of his most vocal critics during this time was the urban activist Jane Jacobs, whose book The Death and Life of Great American Cities was instrumental in turning opinion against Moses's plans; the city government rejected the expressway in 1964.

Moses's power was further eroded by his association with the 1964 New York World's Fair. His projections for attendance of 70 million people for this event proved wildly optimistic, and generous contracts for Fair executives and contractors made matters worse economically. Moses's repeated and forceful public denials of the fair's considerable financial difficulties in the face of evidence to the contrary eventually provoked press and governmental investigations, which found accounting irregularities. In his organization of the fair, Moses's reputation was now undermined by the same personal character traits that had worked in his favor in the past: disdain for the opinions of others and high-handed attempts to get his way in moments of conflict by turning to the press. The fact that the fair was not sanctioned by the Bureau of International Expositions (BIE), the worldwide body supervising such events, would be devastating to the success of the event. Moses refused to accept BIE requirements, including a restriction against charging ground rents to exhibitors, and the BIE in turn instructed its member nations not to participate. The United States had already staged the sanctioned Century 21 Exposition in Seattle in 1962. According to the rules of the organization, no one nation could host more than one fair in a decade. The major European democracies, as well as Canada, Australia, and the Soviet Union, were all BIE members and they declined to participate, instead reserving their efforts for Expo 67 in Montreal.

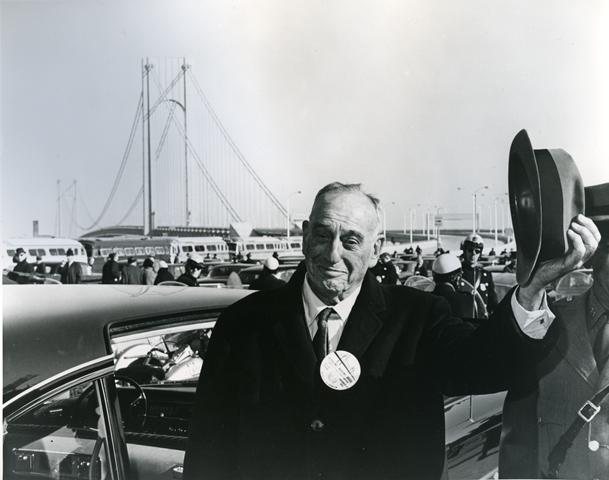
Robert Moses gives a salute after the ribbon-cutting ceremony to open the Verrazzano–Narrows Bridge on November 21, 1964

After the World's Fair debacle, New York City mayor John Lindsay, along with Governor Nelson Rockefeller, sought to direct toll revenues from the Triborough Bridge and Tunnel Authority's (TBTA) bridges and tunnels to cover deficits in the city's then financially ailing agencies, including the subway system. Moses opposed this idea and fought to prevent it. Lindsay then removed Moses from his post as the city's chief advocate for federal highway money in Washington.

The legislature's vote to fold the TBTA into the newly created Metropolitan Transportation Authority (MTA) could have led to a lawsuit by the TBTA bondholders. Since the bond contracts were written into state law, it was unconstitutional to impair existing contractual obligations, as the bondholders had the right of approval over such actions. The largest holder of TBTA bonds, and thus agent for all the others, was the Chase Manhattan Bank, headed then by David Rockefeller, the governor's brother. No suit was filed. Moses could have directed TBTA to go to court against the action, but having been promised a role in the merged authority, Moses declined to challenge the merger. On March 1, 1968, the TBTA was folded into the MTA and Moses gave up his post as chairman of the TBTA. He eventually became a consultant to the MTA, but its new chairman and the governor froze him out—the promised role did not materialize, and for all practical purposes Moses was out of power.

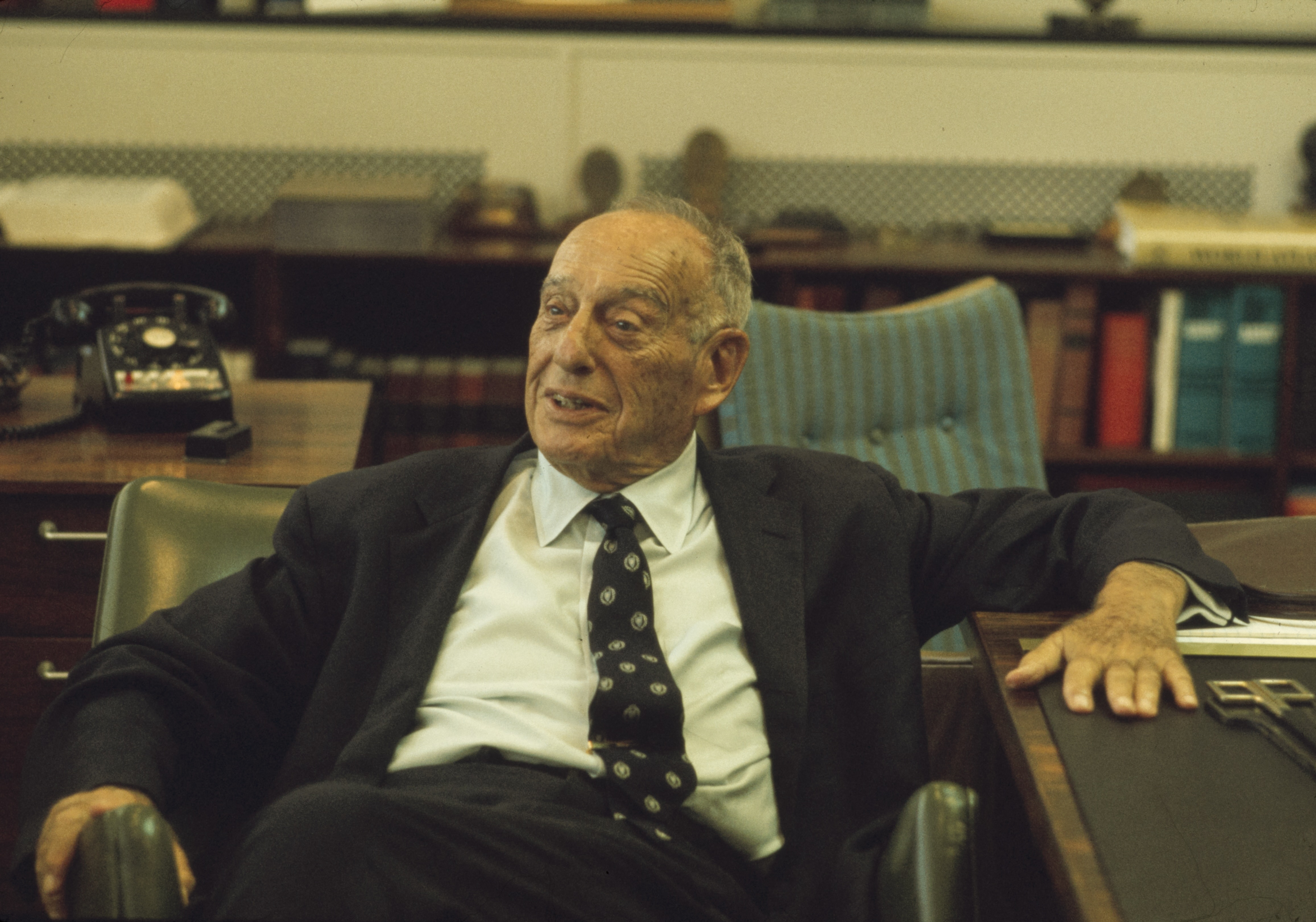
Robert Moses, in office, Randall Island, N.Y., 1978

Moses had thought he had convinced Nelson Rockefeller of the need for one last great bridge project, a span crossing Long Island Sound from Rye to Oyster Bay. Rockefeller did not press for the project in the late 1960s through 1970, fearing public backlash among suburban Republicans would hinder his re-election prospects. A 1972 study found the bridge was fiscally prudent and could be environmentally manageable (according to the comparatively low environmental impact parameters of that period), but the anti-development sentiment was now insurmountable and in 1973 Rockefeller canceled plans for the bridge.

==== The Power Broker ====
External videos
- Presentation by Robert Caro on Robert Moses and urban development at the Brookings Institution, September 28, 1998, C-SPAN

Moses's image suffered a further blow in 1974 with the publication of The Power Broker, a Pulitzer Prize–winning biography by Robert A. Caro. Caro's 1,200-page book (edited down from 2,000 or so pages) showed Moses generally in a negative light; essayist Phillip Lopate writes that "Moses's satanic reputation with the public can be traced, in the main, to ... Caro's magnificent biography". Caro's book won both the Pulitzer Prize in Biography in 1975 and the Francis Parkman Prize (which is awarded by the Society of American Historians), and was named one of the 100 greatest non-fiction books of the twentieth century by the Modern Library. Upon its publication, Moses denounced the biography in a 23-page statement, to which Caro replied to defend his work's integrity.

As illustrated by the book's subtitle, "Caro [...] doesn't pretend to be neutral" in his treatment of Moses. According to Caro's website, the biography depicts Moses as an "idealist" in his youth who "first created a miraculous flowering of parks and parkways, playlands and beaches—and then ultimately brought down on the city the smog-choked aridity of our urban landscape", having made power "an end in itself". The biography holds Moses responsible for "the endless miles of (never sufficient) highway, the hopeless sprawl of Long Island, the massive failures of public housing, and countless other barriers to humane living." It concludes that it is impossible to know how New York would have developed without Moses's influence.

Particularly enduring criticisms made in the biography relate to Moses's alleged racist tendencies (for instance, his toleration of MetLife's Stuyvesant Town being restricted to white residents, or his alleged lowering of parkway bridges to keep public buses off of beaches), his insensitive methods of construction and disfavoring of public transit, and his fraught relationship with his brother and mother. Additionally, The Power Broker brought discussion of urban displacement into the public consciousness through its coverage of Moses's infrastructure projects: Caro calculated Moses's projects altogether displaced around 250,000 people.

It was well known that Robert Moses had a disregard for public input, but until the publication of Caro's book, they had not known many details of his private life—for instance, that his older brother Paul had spent much of his life in poverty. Paul and Robert had similar personalities but were at odds due to their different political ideals. Robert was said to have blocked Paul, an engineer, from being hired for any public service jobs including major infrastructure projects that Robert himself had spearheaded. Paul, whom Caro interviewed shortly before the former's death, claimed Robert had exerted undue influence on their mother to change her will in Robert's favor shortly before her death. Caro notes that Paul was on bad terms with their mother over a long period and she may have changed the will of her own accord, and implies that Robert's subsequent treatment of Paul may have been legally justifiable but was morally questionable.

== Death ==
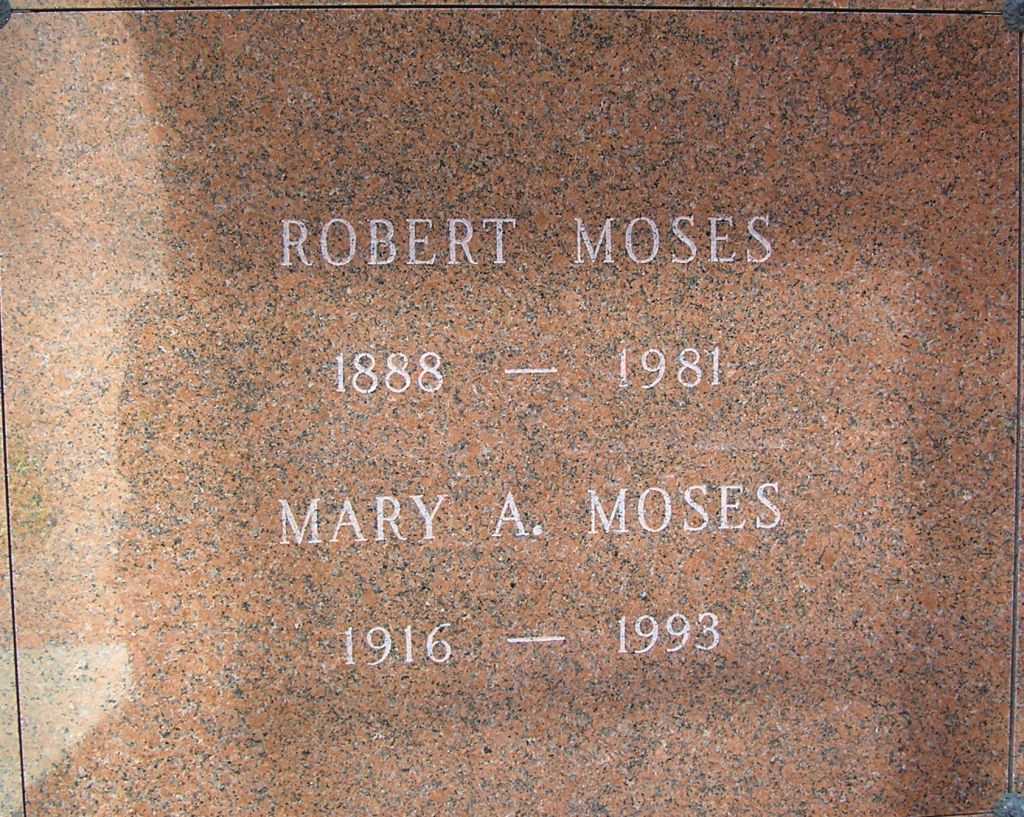
The crypt of Robert Moses

During the last years of his life, Moses concentrated on his lifelong love of swimming and was an active member of the Colonie Hill Health Club.

Moses died of heart disease on July 29, 1981, at the age of 92 at Good Samaritan Hospital in West Islip, New York.

Moses was interred in a crypt in an outdoor community mausoleum in Woodlawn Cemetery in The Bronx, New York City following services at St. Peter's by-the-Sea Episcopal Church in Bay Shore, New York.

== Legacy ==
Various locations and roadways in New York State bear Moses's name. These include two state parks, Robert Moses State Park – Thousand Islands in Massena, New York and Robert Moses State Park – Long Island, the Robert Moses Causeway on Long Island, and the Robert Moses Niagara Power Plant in Lewiston, New York. The Niagara Scenic Parkway in Niagara Falls, New York was originally named the Robert Moses State Parkway in his honor; its name was changed in 2016. The Moses-Saunders Power Dam in Massena, New York also bears his name. Moses also has a school named after him in North Babylon, New York on Long Island; there is also a Robert Moses Playground in New York City. There are other signs of the surviving appreciation held for him by some circles of the public. A statue of Moses was erected next to the Village Hall in his long-time hometown, Babylon Village, New York.

During his tenure as chief of the state park system, the state's inventory of parks grew to nearly 2,600,000 acres (1,100,000 ha). By the time he left office, he had built 658 playgrounds in New York City alone, plus 416 miles (669 km) of parkways and 13 bridges. The proportion of public benefit corporations is greater in New York than in any other U.S. state, however, making them the prime mode of infrastructure building and maintenance in New York and accounting for 90% of the state's debt.

== Appraisal ==
=== Criticism and The Power Broker ===
Moses's life was most famously characterized in Robert Caro's 1974 award-winning biography The Power Broker.

The book highlighted his practice of starting projects certain to cost more than the initial funding approved by the New York State Legislature, knowing the legislature would eventually have to fund the full project to avoid appearing to have provided ineffective oversight (fait accompli). He was also characterized as using his political power to benefit cronies, including a case in which he secretly shifted the planned route of the Northern State Parkway large distances to avoid impinging on the estates of the rich, but told owners of the family farms who lost land that it was an unbiased decision based on "engineering considerations." The book also charged that Moses libeled officials who opposed him, attempting to have them removed from office by calling them communists during the Red Scare. The biography further notes that Moses fought against schools and other public needs in favor of his preference for parks.

Moses's critics charge that he preferred automobiles over people. They point out that he displaced hundreds of thousands of residents in New York City and destroyed traditional neighborhoods by building multiple expressways through them. The projects contributed to the ruin of the South Bronx and the amusement parks of Coney Island, caused the Brooklyn Dodgers and the New York Giants Major League Baseball teams to relocate to Los Angeles and San Francisco respectively, and precipitated the decline of public transport from disinvestment and neglect. His construction of expressways also hindered the proposed expansion of the New York City Subway from the 1930s to well into the 1960s because the parkways and expressways that were built replaced, at least to some extent, the planned subway lines. The 1968 Program for Action (which was never completed) was hoped to counter that. Other critics charge that he precluded the use of public transit, which would have allowed non-car-owners to enjoy the elaborate recreation facilities he built.

==== Racism ====
Criticisms of Moses and his work, particularly The Power Broker, characterize Moses and his planning decisions as racist. Generally, these criticisms rest on the perceived disproportionate racial impact of Moses's decisions and instances where Moses is said to have explicitly made decisions to the disadvantage of black and brown residents.

Critics charge that Moses used various methods to keep black and brown New Yorkers away from the parks and beaches he built. Caro writes that Moses attempted to discourage black people from visiting Jones Beach, the centerpiece of the Long Island state park system, by such measures as making it difficult for black groups to get permits to park buses, and assigning black lifeguards to "distant, less developed beaches". While the exclusion of commercial vehicles and the use of low bridges where appropriate were standard on earlier parkways, where they had been instituted for aesthetic reasons, Moses appears to have made greater use of low bridges, which his aide Sidney Shapiro said was done to make it more difficult for future legislatures to allow access for commercial vehicles. Steve Woolgar and Geoff Cooper refer to the claim about bridges as an "urban legend", and Kenneth T. Jackson similarly refutes that there was nefarious intent.

Regarding Stuyvesant Town, a Manhattan residential development complex created to house World War II veterans, Moses and the LaGuardia administration defended the Metropolitan Life Insurance Company's decision to exclude black residents from the development, regarding it as a private project despite its public subsidization. Moses believed that public supervision of MetLife's tenant selection would make it "impossible to get insurance companies and banks to help us clear sub-standard, run-down, and cancerous areas in the heart of the city.”

Additionally, there were allegations that Moses selectively chose locations for recreational facilities based on the racial compositions of a neighborhood, such as when he selected sites for eleven pools that opened in 1936. According to one author, Moses purposely placed some pools in neighborhoods with mainly white populations to deter African Americans from using them, and other pools intended for African Americans, such as the one in Colonial Park (now Jackie Robinson Park), were placed in inconvenient locations. Another author wrote that of 255 playgrounds built in the 1930s under Moses's tenure, only two were in largely black neighborhoods. Caro wrote that close associates of Moses had claimed they could keep African Americans from using the Thomas Jefferson Pool, in then-predominantly-white East Harlem, by making the water too cold. Nonetheless, no other source has corroborated the claim that heaters in any particular pool were deactivated or not included in the pool's design; Kenneth T. Jackson asserted these claims were "just wrong."

On March 26, 1952, Moses gave a speech at an event in New York City which commemorated Lady Randolph Churchill, the mother of Sir Winston Churchill. In the speech, Moses claimed that Rudyard Kipling foresaw "the rise of lesser breeds without the law", a comment described as "excruciatingly racist" by the journalist Glen Jeffries.

In response to the biography, Moses defended his forced displacement of poor and minority communities as an inevitable part of urban revitalization: "I raise my stein to the builder who can remove ghettos without moving people as I hail the chef who can make omelets without breaking eggs." Defenders of Moses and critics of The Power Broker say that that there is "little evidence in Mr. Moses’ urban planning practices that he singled out the city’s relatively small Black and Puerto Rican populations for particular punishment". Some of the racist incidents documented in The Power Broker, including the overpass-lowering and pool-cooling episodes, have been called fabrications by critics.

=== Reappraisal ===
Some scholars have attempted to rehabilitate Moses's reputation by contrasting the scale of works with the high cost and the slow speed of public works in the decades following his era. The peak of Moses's construction occurred during the economic duress of the Great Depression, and despite the era's woes, Moses's projects were completed in a timely fashion and have been reliable public works since then, which compares favorably to the delays that New York City officials have had in redeveloping the Ground Zero site of the former World Trade Center or to the delays and technical problems surrounding the Second Avenue Subway and Boston's Big Dig project.

Three major exhibits in 2007 prompted a reconsideration of his image among some intellectuals, as they acknowledged the magnitude of his achievements. According to the Columbia University architectural historian Hilary Ballon and colleagues, Moses deserves a better reputation. They argue that his legacy is more relevant than ever and that people take the parks, playgrounds, and housing that Moses built, now generally binding forces in those areas, for granted even if the old-style New York neighborhood was of no interest to Moses himself. Moreover, were it not for Moses's public infrastructure and his resolve to carve out more space, they argue that New York might not have been able to recover from the blight and flight of the 1970s and the 1980s to become today's economic magnet.

"Every generation writes its own history," wrote Kenneth T. Jackson in the New York Times in 2007. "It could be that The Power Broker was a reflection of its time: New York was in trouble and had been in decline for 15 years. Now, for a whole host of reasons, New York is entering a new time, a time of optimism, growth and revival that hasn't been seen in half a century. And that causes us to look at our infrastructure," said Jackson. "A lot of big projects are on the table again, and it kind of suggests a Moses era without Moses," he added. Politicians are also reconsidering the Moses legacy; in a 2006 speech to the Regional Plan Association on downstate transportation needs, New York Governor-elect Eliot Spitzer stated a biography of Moses written today might be called At Least He Got It Built: "That's what we need today. A real commitment to get things done."

== In popular culture ==
- Moses is the subject of a satirical song by John Forster entitled "The Ballad of Robert Moses", included on his 1997 album Helium.
- In season 3, episode 2 of the television series Unbreakable Kimmy Schmidt, "Kimmy's Roommate Lemonades", Kimmy is shown considering attendance at several New York City colleges with comedic names based on the city's culture and history. One was originally called "Robert Moses College for Whites", and its sign has been altered by crossing out "Whites" and replacing it with the word "Everyone".
- Moses is the subject of a critical song by NYHC band Sick of It All entitled "Robert Moses was a racist", included on their 2018 album Wake the sleeping dragon!.
- The band Bob Moses is named after Robert Moses.
- A fictionalized version of Moses is the main villain of The Unsleeping City, the third season of the web series Dimension 20.
- The character of Moses Randolph in Motherless Brooklyn is based on Robert Moses.
- At the beginning of the COVID pandemic, when many TV commentators, politicians and others worked from their homes, The New York Times noted the frequent placement of The Power Broker as a background element.
- The 2021 film adaptation of West Side Story adds the historical context of New York City's urban gentrification in the 1950s. During the song "America", a group of Puerto Rican demonstrators appear, protesting their pending evictions, and one of them holds a sign condemning Moses.
- The 2022 play Straight Line Crazy depicts Robert Moses's shaping of New York City.
- The character of Lewis Solomon in the Blacksad graphic novel album "They All Fall Down" is based on Moses.

== See also ==
- Car culture
- Federal Power Commission v. Tuscarora Indian Nation
- Modernist architecture
- Transportation in New York City
- Urban sprawl
- M. Justin Herman
- Edward J. Logue
- Edmund Bacon (architect)
- Austin Tobin – Port Authority Executive Director
- Long Island State Parkway Police
- New York State Park Police
- New York State Police

== Bibliography ==
- Ballon, Hilary (2007). Robert Moses and the modern city : the transformation of New York. New York: W.W. Norton & Co. ISBN 978-0-393-73243-6. OCLC 76167277.
- Berman, Marshall (1988). All that is solid melts into air : the experience of modernity. New York, N.Y.: Viking Penguin. ISBN 978-0-14-010962-7. OCLC 16923119.
- Caro, Robert (1974). The Power Broker: Robert Moses and the Fall of New York. New York: Knopf. ISBN 978-0-394-48076-3.
- Caro, Robert A. (July 22, 1974). "The Power Broker—I: How Robert Moses Transformed New York". The New Yorker. pp. 32–64. Archived from the original on January 14, 2025.
- Christin, Pierre (2014). Robert Moses : Master Builder of New York City. London: Nobrow. ISBN 978-1-907704-96-3. OCLC 875240382.
- Christin, Pierre; Balez, Olivier (2018). Robert Moses: The Master Builder of New York City. London: Nobrow. ISBN 978-1-910620-36-6.
- Doig, Jameson W. (1990). "Regional Conflict in the New York Metropolis: the Legend of Robert Moses and the Power of the Port Authority". Urban Studies. 27 (2). Sage Publications: 201–232. Bibcode:1990UrbSt..27..201D. doi:10.1080/00420989020080181. ISSN 0042-0980. S2CID 146841751.
- Gutman, Marta (December 2008). "Race, Place, and Play: Robert Moses and the WPA Swimming Pools in New York City". Journal of the Society of Architectural Historians. 67 (4): 532–561. doi:10.1525/jsah.2008.67.4.532. JSTOR 10.1525/jsah.2008.67.4.532.
- Krieg, Joann (1989). Robert Moses : single-minded genius. Interlaken, N.Y: Heart of the Lakes Pub. ISBN 978-1-55787-041-4. OCLC 18961485.
- Lewis, Eugene (1980). Public entrepreneurship : toward a theory of bureaucratic political power : the organizational lives of Hyman Rickover, J. Edgar Hoover, and Robert Moses. Bloomington: Indiana University Press. ISBN 978-0-253-17384-3. OCLC 6581080.
- Moses, Robert (1970). Public Works: A Dangerous Trade. McGraw-Hill.
- Rogers, Cleveland (January 1, 1939). "Robert Moses". The Atlantic. Archived from the original on July 6, 2019.
- Rodgers, Cleveland (1952). Robert Moses: Builder for Democracy. Holt. Archived from the original on September 28, 2024.
- Vidal, Gore (October 17, 1974). "Emperor of Concrete: What Robert Moses Did to New York City". Review of The Power Broker by Robert A. Caro. New York Review of Books. Archived from the original on December 12, 2024.

=== Other sources ===
Exhibits:

- "The Triborough Bridge: Robert Moses and the Automobile Age" Archived October 9, 2021, at the Wayback Machine exhibit at the New York Transit Museum
- "Robert Moses and the Modern City" Archived October 28, 2017, at the Wayback Machine exhibit February 2007 thru May 2007 at 3 New York City museums
- "Looking Back at Moses" Archived December 8, 2015, at the Wayback Machine a trio of New York museums
- Photographs from the Museum of the City of New York exhibit Archived December 3, 2013, at the Wayback Machine

Papers:

- Robert Moses papers, 1907–1980 Archived December 10, 2014, at the Wayback Machine, held by the Manuscripts and Archives Division, New York Public Library
- Online letters of Moses
- Moses's response to Robert Caro's accusations Archived June 1, 2018, at the Wayback Machine

Archival Audio:

- The Robert Moses Collection Archived July 29, 2016, at the Wayback Machine at The WNYC Archives

Interviews:

- 1973 audio interview of Robert Moses by Don Swaim of CBS Radio, RealAudio at Wired for Books.org
- Robert A. Caro talks to Richard D. Heffner about Robert Moses on the Open Mind, 1998

Political offices
Preceded by Florence E. S. Knapp	Secretary of State of New York; January 17, 1927 – January 1, 1929	Succeeded by Edward J. Flynn
Civic offices
Preceded by Unified	Commissioner of the New York City Department of Parks and Recreation; January 18, 1934 – May 23, 1960	Succeeded by Newbold Morris
Government offices
Preceded by Established	Chairman of the New York State Council of Parks; April 30, 1924 – January 1, 1963	Succeeded by Laurance Rockefeller
Preceded by Nathan Burkan	Chairman of the Triborough Bridge Authority; November 14, 1936 – April 25, 1946	Succeeded by Merged into Triborough Bridge and Tunnel Authority
Preceded by Unified	Chairman of the Triborough Bridge and Tunnel Authority; April 26, 1946 – February 29, 1968	Succeeded by Merged into Metropolitan Transportation Authority
Preceded by John E. Burton	Chairman of the New York Power Authority; March 8, 1954 – January 1, 1963	Succeeded by James A. FitzPatrick
Party political offices
Preceded by William Joseph Donovan	Republican Nominee for Governor of New York; 1934	Succeeded by William F. Bleakley
