= 1933 New York City mayoral election =

- November 7, 1933
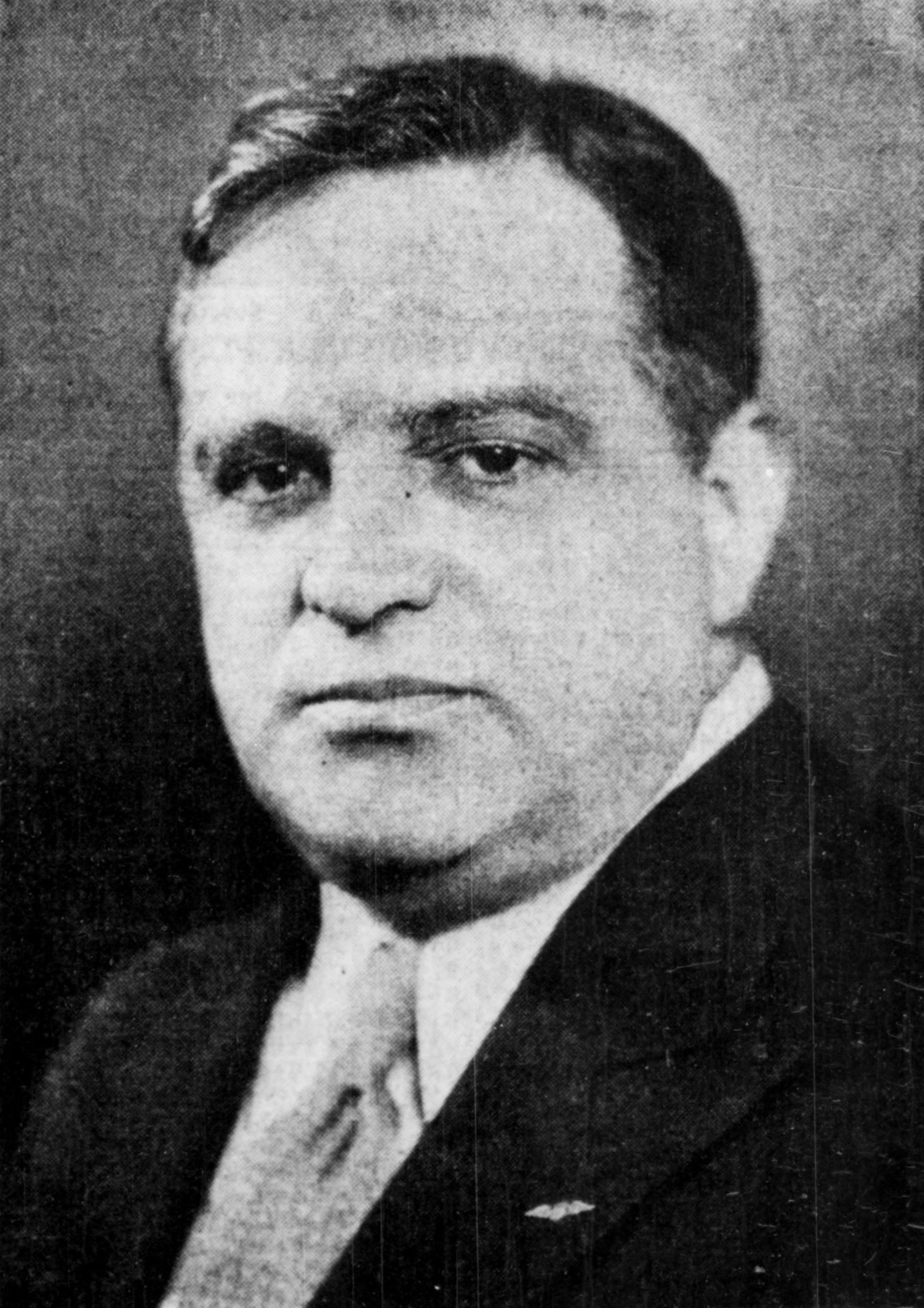

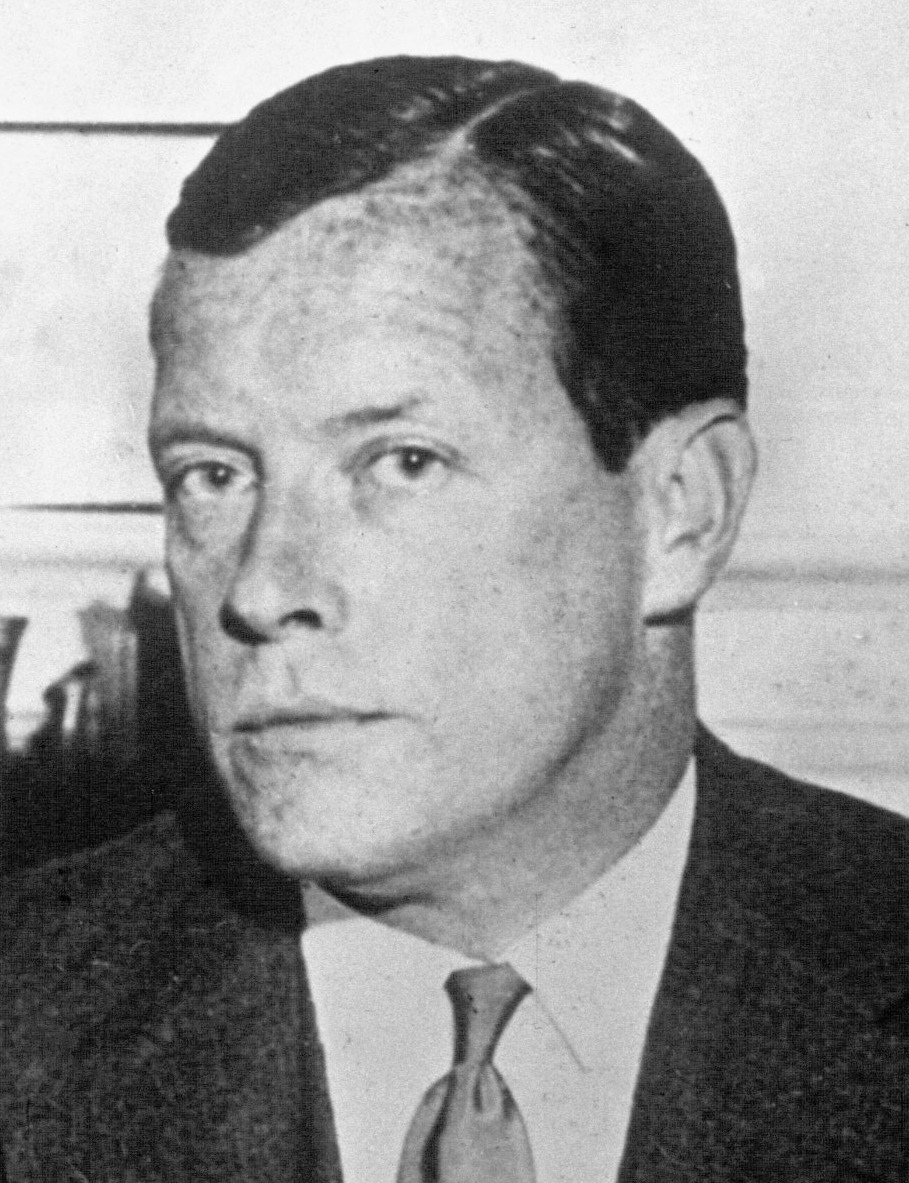

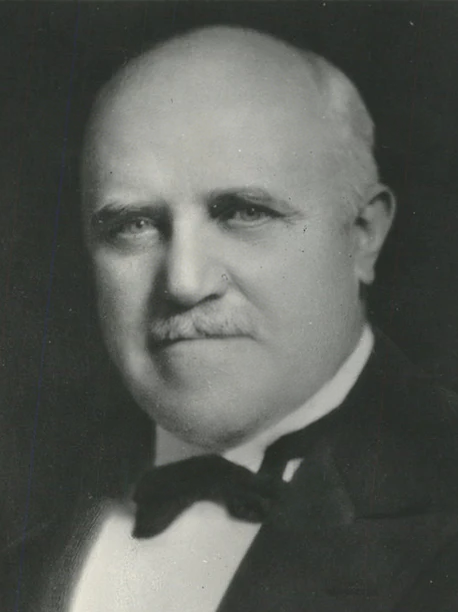
Candidate	Fiorello La Guardia	Joseph V. McKee	John P. O'Brien
Party	Republican	Recovery	Democratic
Alliance	City Fusion		Jefferson
Popular vote	868,522	609,053	586,672
Percentage	40.38%	28.32%	27.27%
- Borough results LaGuardia: 30–40% 40–50%
Mayor before election
John P. O'Brien
Democratic
Elected mayor
Fiorello La Guardia
Republican

The New York City mayoral election of 1933 took place on November 7, 1933, in New York City. Incumbent Democratic Mayor John P. O'Brien, who was elected in a special election after the resignation of Mayor Jimmy Walker, faced Republican Congressman and 1929 mayoral candidate Fiorello La Guardia, and former acting mayor and President of the New York City Board of Aldermen Joseph V. McKee, who became acting mayor after Walker's resignation until the special election, and ran on the Recovery Party line. This was the first time since 1901 that Republicans won a mayoral election in New York City. This is also the worst performance by a Democratic candidate in a New York City mayoral election.

== Background ==
Incumbent Democratic Mayor Jimmy Walker, who was a member of Tammany Hall, won reelection in the 1929 election against Republican nominee Fiorello La Guardia. Walker resigned on September 1, 1932, following investigations into corruption by the Hofstadter Committee under the leadership of Samuel Seabury. Joseph V. McKee succeeded Walker as mayor, but his opponents successfully sued for a 1932 special election, in which Tammany-backed John P. O'Brien was elected.

The City Fusion Party was formed in opposition to Tammany Hall following O'Brien's victory, inspired by the Charter Party of Cincinnati, which defeated Rudolph K. Hynicka's political machine in the 1920s, and grew out of William Jay Schieffelin's Committee of One Thousand. The Fusion Conference Committee, a group of reformers and Republicans, was formed to select a candidate to oppose Tammany Hall in the mayoral election. The main leaders of the committee were former governor Charles Seymour Whitman, J. Barstow Smull, Joseph M. Price, and Maurice P. Davidson.

There were 2,324,389 registered voters in New York City in 1933, with 435,966 of them being Republicans. Herbert Hoover failed to win New York City in the 1928 and 1932 presidential elections.

== Democratic nomination ==
=== Candidates ===
- Jerome G. Ambro, Assemblyman from Bushwick
- Loring M. Black Jr., U.S. Representative from Brooklyn
- Axel T. Fredlund (also running as American)
- John P. O'Brien, incumbent mayor since 1932

=== Campaign ===
Mayor O'Brien ran for re-election with the support of Tammany Hall and the Brooklyn party machine, led by John F. Curry and John H. McCooey respectively. He was opposed by two insurgent candidates, U.S. Representative Loring M. Black Jr. and Assemblyman Jerome G. Ambro.

In the waning days of the campaign, there were calls for O'Brien to withdraw from the race. In an interview at City Hall, O'Brien emphatically denied that he would withdraw and predicted his own re-election. Both insurgent candidates predicted they would win the primary, which party organization men characterized as absurd, predicting a large plurality for O'Brien.

=== Results ===
1933 Democratic mayoral primary
Party	Candidate	Votes	%
Democratic	John P. O'Brien (incumbent)	277,899	68.08%
Democratic	Loring M. Black Jr.	97,499	23.89%
Democratic	Jerome G. Ambro	27,443	6.72%
Democratic	Axel T. Fredlund	5,345	1.31%
Total votes		408,186	100.00%

== City Fusion nomination ==
=== Candidates ===
- Fiorello La Guardia, U.S. Representative from East Harlem (Republican)

==== Withdrawn ====
- John F. O'Ryan, World War I veteran, founder of the American Legion, and airline executive (Republican)

==== Declined ====
- Raymond V. Ingersoll, former Brooklyn Parks Commissioner (Democratic; ran for Brooklyn Borough President)
- John C. Knox, judge of the United States District Court for the Southern District of New York (Independent)
- Joseph V. McKee, former President of the Board of Alderman and acting mayor (Democratic; drafted to run as independent)
- George Vincent McLaughlin, former New York City Police Commissioner (Democratic)
- Robert Moses, chairman of the New York State Council of Parks, commissioner of the New York City Department of Parks and Recreation, and former Secretary of State of New York (Republican)
- Richard Cunningham Patterson Jr., NBC executive and former Commissioner of the New York City Department of Corrections (Independent)
- Samuel Seabury, former New York Court of Appeals judge and lead investigator of the Hofstadter Committee (Democratic)
- Clarence J. Shearn, former New York Supreme Court justice (Independent)
- Al Smith, former Governor of New York and 1928 Democratic Party nominee for President of the United States (Democratic)
- Nathan Straus Jr., former State Senator from Midtown Manhattan (Democratic)

=== Campaign ===
Although many members were Republicans, the committee sought to give its support to an independent Democrat, due to four-to-one advantage in voter registration in favor of the Democratic Party in the city.

Samuel Seabury, whose investigations led to the resignation of Mayor Walker, declined to be a candidate for mayor, as he felt that he would be accused of conducting the investigation for political ambition. A draft movement sought to bring Al Smith into the election as the head of a coalition, but he declined to run on May 15. The committee then considered Raymond Ingersoll, John C. Knox, George Vincent McLaughlin, Richard Cunningham Patterson Jr., Clarence J. Shearn, and Straus for the nomination, but Straus declined, stating that he was afraid of increasing antisemitism if both the governor of New York (Herbert H. Lehman) and the mayor of New York City were Jewish.

Having failed to recruit a Democratic candidate, the committee narrowed its choices to Fiorello La Guardia, Robert Moses, and John F. O'Ryan. The committee voted to give its nomination to Moses on July 26, without telling Seabury, who was opposed to Moses and supported La Guardia. However, Moses called Price to decline the nomination as Moses failed to gain Smith's endorsement.

Whitman, who was also the chair of the Republican mayoral nominating committee and opponent of La Guardia, suggested O'Ryan, and Joseph M. Price stated that "If it's La Guardia or bust, I prefer bust!". The committee voted to give O'Ryan the nomination, and he accepted. However, Seabury opposed Whitman, who had defeated him in the 1916 gubernatorial election, and O'Ryan, stating that he was inexperienced in politics. Seabury formed a competing committee with Charles Culp Burlingham, Roy W. Howard, and George Z. Medalie to replace the Fusion Conference Committee. To avoid a split, W. Kingsland Macy asked for O'Ryan to withdraw, and O'Ryan agreed to do so if he failed to receive a "convincing unanimity" from the Republican mayoralty committee. La Guardia likewise stated that he would support O'Ryan if the latter received the nomination.

When a majority of the Republican mayoralty committee voted to support La Guardia on August 4, he secured the City Fusion nomination as well.

== Republican nomination ==
=== Candidates ===
- Fiorello La Guardia, U.S. Representative from East Harlem

==== Withdrawn ====
- John F. O'Ryan, World War I veteran, founder of the American Legion, and airline executive

==== Declined ====
- Samuel Seabury, former Court of Appeals judge and lead investigator of the Hofstadter Committee (Democratic)

=== Campaign ===
The Republican mayoralty committee met on August 3. Whitman introduced a resolution to endorse O'Ryan, but it was filibustered by Ed Corsi, Stanley M. Isaacs, Vito Marcantonio, and Charles H. Tuttle. Seabury was offered the nomination, but he declined it. The majority of the committee initially supported O'Ryan, but a majority later supported La Guardia and O'Ryan released his supporters. La Guardia was given the nominations of the Republican and City Fusion parties after midnight on August 4. William Chadbourne served as La Guardia's campaign manager.

== General election ==
=== Background ===
Samuel S. Koenig, the leader of the Republican Party in Manhattan and a political machine, was defeated in the September primaries and replaced by Chase Mellen, a reformist who supported La Guardia. Three of the eight Tammany Hall district leaders lost reelection in their primaries.

=== Candidates ===
- Henry Klein (Five Cent Fare and Taxpayers')
- Fiorello La Guardia, U.S. Representative from East Harlem (Republican and City Fusion)
- Joseph McKee, former President of the New York Board of Aldermen and acting Mayor (Recovery)
- Robert Minor (Communist)
- John P. O'Brien, incumbent mayor since 1932 (Democratic and Jefferson)
- Charles Solomon, former Assemblyman (Socialist)

==== Disqualified ====
- Axel T. Fredlund (American)

La Guardia's ticket was selected for ethnic and political considerations. W. Arthur Cunningham, the candidate for New York City Comptroller, was a reformer and a Catholic. Bernard S. Deutsch, the candidate for President of the Board of Aldermen, was the chair of the City Fusion Party in the Bronx and president of the American Jewish Congress. Jacob Gould Schurman Jr., the candidate for New York County District Attorney, was the son of Jacob Gould Schurman, who had served as the president of Cornell University and in United States foreign affairs. It was the first time in the history of New York City that the four highest positions had Italian, Irish, Jewish, and WASP candidates on the same ticket.

The Law Preservation Party did not nominate a candidate for mayor.

=== Campaign ===
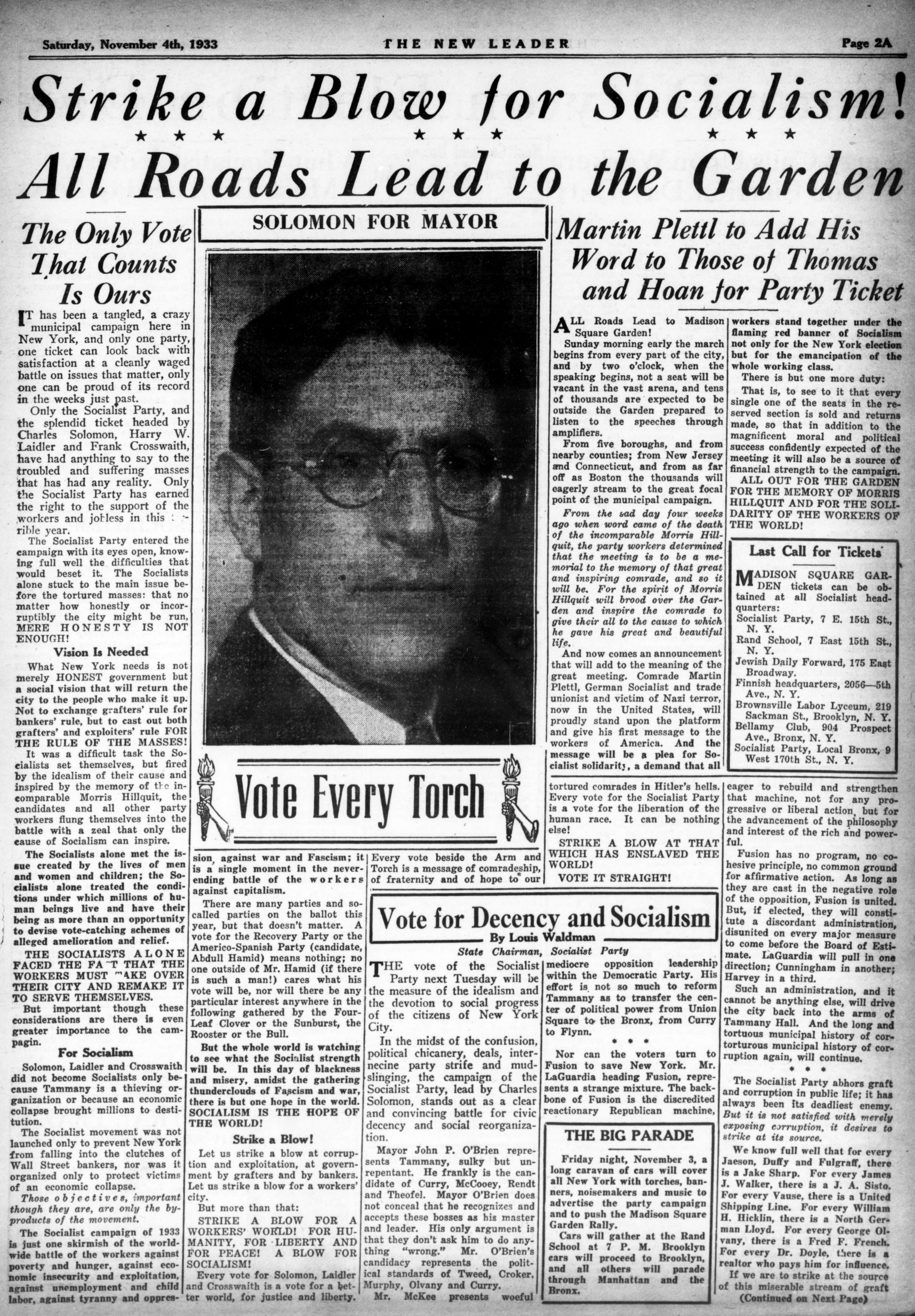
Page from The New Leader advertising Charles Solomon's candidacy, November 4, 1933

Polling conducted by The Literary Digest showed La Guardia defeating O'Brien by a margin of four-to-one. President Franklin D. Roosevelt sent James Farley and Edward J. Flynn to convince McKee to run in the election as O'Brien was predicted to easily lose to La Guardia. Roosevelt's attempts were leaked on September 23, and La Guardia unsuccessfully appealed to McKee not to run. McKee announced that he would run for mayor on the ballot line of the Recovery Party on September 30, with Harry M. Durning as his campaign manager.

McKee's late entry into the race placed him at a serious disadvantage, and the Recovery Party was unable to nominate a full slate of candidates or lead a voter registration campaign. Although he had a large fundraising advantage of two-to-one over La Guardia and the support of a broader circulation of newspapers, La Guardia had made up ground from his 1929 campaign, due to financial support from figures such as John D. Rockefeller Jr. Unlike 1929, La Guardia ended the campaign with more money than he had spent.

Ed Corsi, Leonard Covello, and Vito Marcantonio were tasked by the La Guardia campaign with outreach to the Italian community. The F.H. La Guardia Club was formed and grew to almost one thousand members and the Honest Ballot Association, while officially non-partisan, was led by supporters of the Fusion campaign, had 20,000 of its members march on election day to prevent voter intimidation. By election day, La Guardia's campaign had increased the total number of registered voters from around 1,500,000 to 2,324,389.

During the campaign, McKee faced renewed scrutiny for his essay "A Serious Question", which questioned the moral and political reliability of young Jewish people in New York City. The essay, which had been published in Catholic World in 1915 when he was a high school teacher, had been used against him during the 1925 election, but it was not effective. To appeal to Jewish voters, who composed around twenty-five percent of the New York City electorate, McKee tied himself to Governor Herbert H. Lehman and sought to tie La Guardia to Seabury, who had criticized Lehman in multiple speeches, which McKee supporters attributed to prejudice. Though La Guardia sought to appeal to Jewish voters and asked Seabury to avoid targeting Lehman, Paul Windels convinced Seabury not to. McKee sent a telegram to La Guardia demanding that he disavow Seabury, but La Guardia refused to after Windels shared "A Serious Question". The telegram conversation between La Guardia and McKee and McKee's essay were published in newspapers, bringing fresh criticism. Samuel Untermyer, who had supported McKee, withdrew his endorsement and called the essay a "reverberation of Hitlerism". President Roosevelt also withdrew an invitation for McKee to visit the White House, intended as an unofficial show of support, and Al Smith declined to endorse any candidate. McKee defended himself on the radio, stating that his words were taken out of context. Jewish supporters Jonah Wise, Henry Morgenthau Sr., Nathan Straus Jr., and Irving Lehman defended McKee and referenced his friendship and sympathy with Jewish people.

La Guardia was attacked from both the left and right. McKee accused La Guardia of being "a Communist at heart" and O'Brien's campaign released anti-La Guardia pamphlets entitled "No Red, No Clown Shall Rule This Town". However, left-wing parties were critical of La Guardia. The Socialist Party of America accused him of being an opportunist. The Socialist Labor Party of America referred to him as an instrument of the ruling class, and the Communist Party USA stated that he was a "capable and valuable servant of finance capital" and "a dangerous foe of the American working class".

=== Endorsements ===
Roy W. Howard's New York World-Telegram offered its support to McKee in early 1933, but now opposed "the present effort to boost him over the back fence". The newspapers that endorsed McKee had a combined readership of 4,137,792 while the ones that endorsed La Guardia had a combined readership of 1,370,953.

Despite his private efforts to recruit McKee, President Roosevelt maintained neutrality, causing Adolf A. Berle, a supporter of La Guardia, to accuse McKee of not supporting the New Deal.

La Guardia endorsements

Organizations

- City Fusion Party

Newspapers

- Il Progresso Italo-Americano, Italian-language newspaper based in New York City
- Jewish Morning Journal, Yiddish-language newspaper based in New York City
- New York Amsterdam News, black newspaper based in New York City
- New York Evening Post, newspaper based in New York City
- New York Herald Tribune, newspaper based in New York City
- New York World-Telegram, newspaper based in New York City
- The Nation, weekly magazine
- The New York Times, newspaper based in New York City

Notable individuals

- Ernest Angell, lawyer and member of the American Civil Liberties Union
- Joseph Warren Barker, dean of the Faculty of Engineering at Columbia University
- Nicholas Murray Butler, President of Columbia University and 1912 presidential election vice-presidential candidate
- Adolf A. Berle, lawyer and educator
- Paul Blanshard, assistant editor of The Nation
- Heywood Broun, journalist
- John T. Flynn, journalist
- Virginia Gildersleeve, dean of Barnard College
- Ernest Gruening, journalist
- Arthur Garfield Hays, lawyer and co-founder of the American Civil Liberties Union
- Norman Hapgood, journalist
- B. W. Huebsch, publisher
- Will Irwin, author
- Horace Kallen, university professor
- Paul Underwood Kellogg, journalist
- Joseph Wood Krutch, author and critic
- Walter Lippmann, journalist
- Francis John McConnell, former president of the Federal Council of Churches
- Joseph McGoldrick, university professor
- Robert Moses, public official
- Parker Thomas Moon, delegate to the Paris Peace Conference
- Amos Pinchot, lawyer
- Walter Pollak, lawyer
- Samuel Seabury, judge and head of the Hofstadter Committee
- Mary Kingsbury Simkhovitch, founder of the Greenwich House
- Carl Van Doren, author
- Oswald Garrison Villard, journalist and publisher of The Nation
- Lillian Wald, founder of the Henry Street Settlement
McKee endorsements

Newspapers

- New York Daily Mirror, newspaper based in New York City
- New York Daily News, newspaper based in New York City
- New York Journal-American, newspaper based in New York City
- The Sun, newspaper based in New York City

Notable individuals

- ~~Samuel Untermyer, lawyer and civic leader~~ (withdrew endorsement)

=== Results ===
La Guardia was the first Italian-American to be elected as mayor of New York City. Charles Solomon, the Socialist nominee, received 59,846 votes which was less than the 122,565 votes received by Norman Thomas in the presidential election and the 249,887 votes that Morris Hillquit received in the previous mayoral election. La Guardia, who had lost in all of the assembly districts in the 1929 election, placed first in all five boroughs and forty-six of the sixty-two assembly districts, while O'Brien won thirteen districts and McKee won three. However, the Democratic Party retained control of the Board of Aldermen, and the combined vote for McKee and O'Brien was 327,203 votes more than for La Guardia.

La Guardia's 40.37% of the popular vote was an improvement on former President Herbert Hoover's results from the 1928 and 1932 presidential election when Hoover 36.71% and 26.62% of the popular vote in New York City respectively, while the combined vote for McKee and O'Brien's was 260,451 fewer than for Franklin D. Roosevelt in the 1932 election. Roosevelt had received 66.32% of the popular vote, while O'Brien received 27.27% and McKee received 28.31%.

La Guardia had the same level of support among Italian-Americans, around 80 to 90 percent, that Roosevelt received for president. La Guardia, who was Jewish, won a plurality of the Jewish vote while O'Brien and McKee's combined Jewish vote was below the 387,000 Roosevelt had received.

1933 New York City mayoral election
Party	Candidate	Votes	%	±%
Republican	Fiorello La Guardia	446,833	20.77%	▼1.21
City Fusion	Fiorello La Guardia	421,689	19.60%	N/A
Total	Fiorello La Guardia	868,522	40.38%	N/A
Recovery	Joseph V. McKee	609,053	28.32%	▲16.72
Democratic	John P. O'Brien	570,937	26.54%	▼25.75
Jefferson	John P. O'Brien	15,735	0.73%	N/A
Total	John P. O'Brien	586,672	27.27%	N/A
Socialist	Charles Solomon	59,846	2.78%	▼9.59
Communist	Robert Minor	26,044	1.21%	▲0.02
Five Cent Fare	Henry Klein	1,636	0.08%	N/A
Taxpayers'	Henry Klein	160	<0.01%	N/A
Total	Henry Klein	1,796	0.08%	N/A
Total votes		2,151,468	100.00%	

=== Results by borough ===
Borough	Fiorello La Guardia	Votes	Republican Votes	City Fusion Votes	Joseph V. McKee	Votes	John P. O'Brien	Votes	Charles Solomon	Votes	Other	Votes	Total
Republican/City Fusion					Recovery		Democratic		Socialist		Other		
The Bronx	37.89% (Note: 15.20% Republican 22.69% City Fusion)	151,669 (Note: 60,854 votes on the Republican ballot line 90,815 votes on the City Fusion ballot line)	60,854	90,815	32.81%	131,280	23.34%	93,403	3.68%	14,758	2.28%	9,122	400,100
Brooklyn	43.72% (Note: 22.60% Republican 21.12% City Fusion)	331,920 (Note: 171,567 votes on the Republican ballot line 160,353 votes on the City Fusion ballot line)	171,567	160,353	25.63%	194,558	25.60%	194,335	3.54%	26,941	1.51%	11,460	758,984
Manhattan	37.99% (Note: 20.95% Republican 17.04% City Fusion)	203,479 (Note: 112,202 votes on the Republican ballot line 91,277 votes on the City Fusion ballot line)	112,202	91,277	23.10%	123,707	35.97%	192,649	1.96%	10,525	0.98%	5,248	535,520
Queens	39.16% (Note: 21.87% Republican 17.29% City Fusion)	154,369 (Note: 86,213 votes on the Republican ballot line 68,156 votes on the City Fusion ballot line)	86,213	68,156	35.85%	141,296	22.96%	90,501	1.69%	6,669	0.34%	1,340	394,131
Staten Island	43.52% (Note: 25.70% Republican 17.81% City Fusion)	27,085 (Note: 15,997 votes on the Republican ballot line 11,088 votes on the City Fusion ballot line)	15,997	11,088	29.26%	18,212	25.36%	15,784	1.53%	953	0.33%	205	62,235
Total	40.38%	868,522	446,833	421,689	28.32%	609,053	27.27%	586,672	2.78%	59,846	1.25%	27,375	2,151,468

=== Analysis ===
McKee's anti-Semitism controversy was blamed for his defeat. Flynn stated that "The damage has been done by the assertion that McKee was anti-Semitic" and Henry Moskowitz stated that the "Jewish controversy had a great deal to do with McKee's defeat. The Jews at that time were under the influence of the Hitler business and a great deal of harm was done to McKee because of the anti-Semitic articles". McKee previously did well in Jewish areas in his elections and received an average of 11.35% of the vote in the eighteen most Jewish assembly districts during the 1932 write-in campaign. McKee and O'Brien split the Democratic vote and both had support from different Democratic political machines.

== See also ==
- Mayoralty of Fiorello La Guardia

== Works cited ==
- Kessner, Thomas (1989). Fiorello H. LaGuardia and the Making of Modern New York. McGraw Hill Education. ISBN 0-07-034244-X.
- Mann, Arthur (1965). La Guardia Comes To Power 1933. J. B. Lippincott & Co.
