= Shearn =

Shearn is an English-language surname and occasional given name. People with the name include:

Surname

- Amy Shearn (born 1979), American writer
- Clarence J. Shearn (1869–1953), American lawyer and judge
- Harry Shearn (1892–1951), Australian politician
- Nicola Shearn (born 1966), British swimmer
- Tom Shearn (born 1977), American baseball player

Given name

- Shearn Moody, Jr. (1933–1996), American entrepreneur
