= NYPD Emergency Service Unit =

NYC police SWAT and rescue unit

Emergency Service Unit
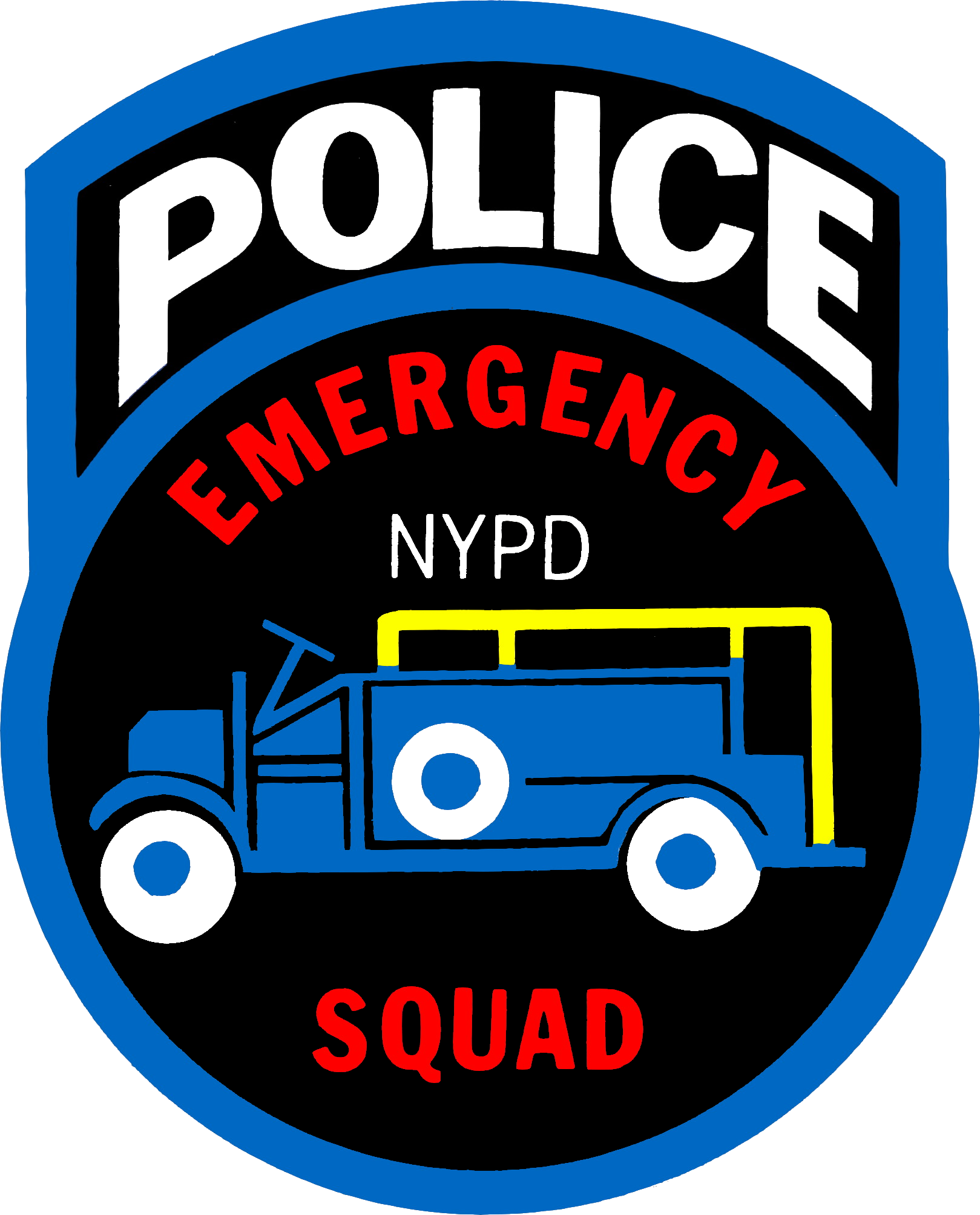
- Active: April 10, 1930; 96 years ago
- Country: United States
- Agency: New York City Police Department
- Part of: NYPD Special Operations Bureau
- Abbreviation: ESU

Structure
- Officers: Approx. 330 (2026)
- Squads: ESS #1 – Lower Manhattan; ESS #2 – Upper Manhattan; ESS #3 – East and South Bronx; ESS #4 – West and North Bronx; ESS #5 – Staten Island; ESS #6 – South Brooklyn; ESS #7 – East Brooklyn; ESS #8 – North Brooklyn; ESS #9 – South Queens; ESS #10 – North Queens; ESS #11 – Assigned to ESU headquarters; ESS #14 – Hazmat/Rescue Truck; Apprehension Tactical Team; Hazmat/Weapons of Mass Destruction Team; Canine Team

Commanders
- Current commander: Assistant Chief Gerard V. Dowling

Website
- www1.nyc.gov/site/nypd/bureaus/patrol/citywide-operations.page

The Emergency Service Unit (ESU) is part of the Special Operations Division of the New York City Police Department and was formed in 1930. The unit provides specialized police tactical support and advanced equipment to other NYPD units. Members of ESU are cross-trained in multiple disciplines for Special Weapons and Tactics, barricaded subjects, hostage rescue missions, high risk search warrants, technical rescue and emergency medical service alongside law enforcement support operations. NYPD ESU is generally considered to be the oldest police SWAT unit in the United States.

ESU is tasked with providing high risk search and arrest warrant service, hostage rescue, resolving barricaded subject situations, technical rescue, emergency medical service, police K9 support, and criminal HazMat and CBRNE handling. As of 2026, ESU consists of approximately 330 members, most of them holding the rank of detective specialist, who are stationed across multiple squads, or “Trucks” divided by borough.

== History ==
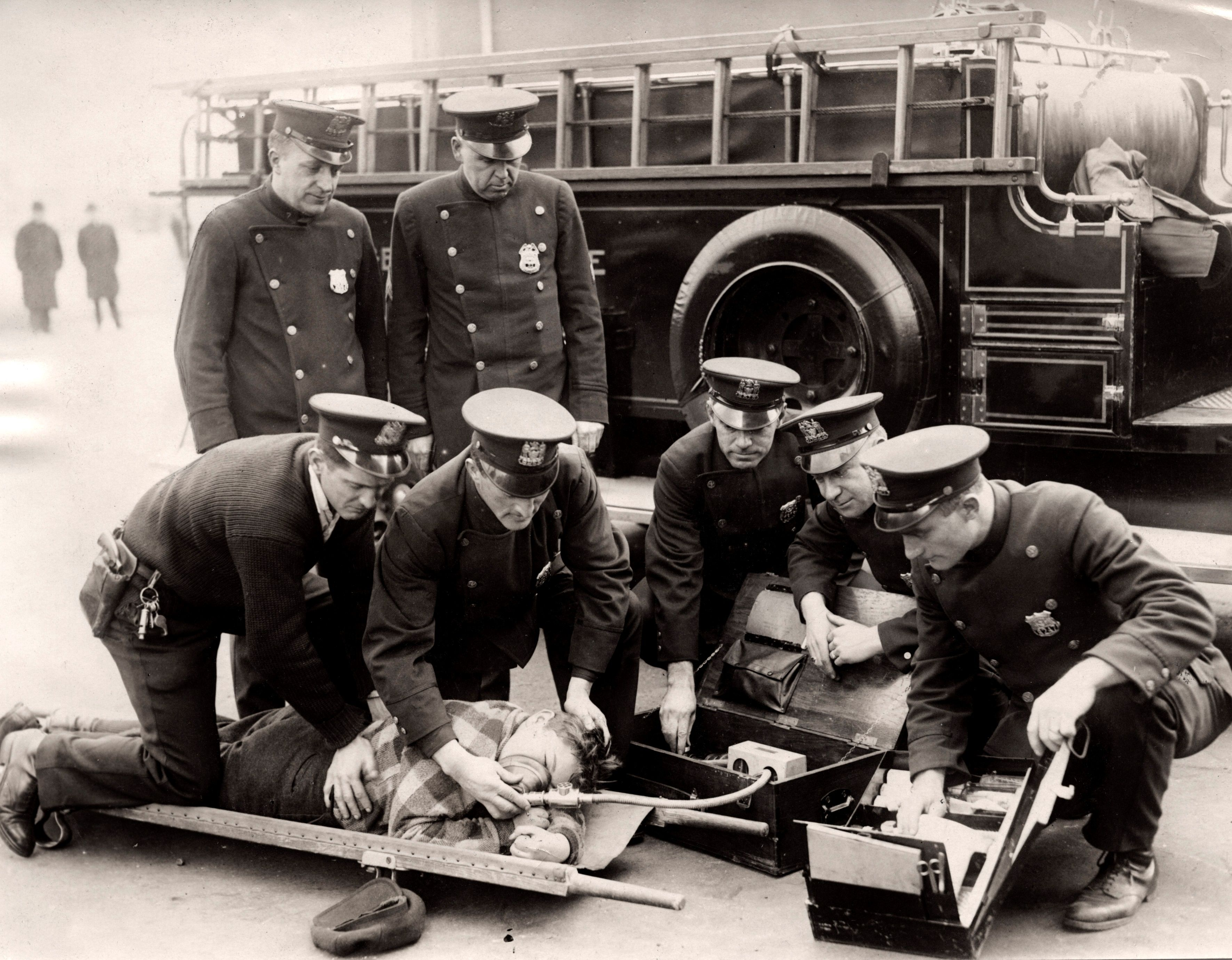
Emergency Automobile Squad officers demonstrating rescue tactics in 1926

On July 7, 1925, Police Commissioner Richard E. Enright established the Emergency Automobile Squad (EAS), the forerunner to the modern ESU. The EAS was created to address the urbanization, motorization, and growth of New York City in the first quarter of the 20th century that left regular officers, who mostly conducted foot patrols, unable to address every call for service. The first two units, Squad 1 (Manhattan/Bronx) and Squad 2 (Brooklyn/Queens) were staffed by six sergeants and 44 officers.

In September 1926, Police Commissioner George McLaughlin formed Squad 3 (Bronx) and renamed the EAS to the Emergency Service Squad (ESS). In May 1928, Police Commissioner Joseph A. Warren doubled the number of existing units. By 1929, the ESS consisted of 11 trucks and was staffed by over 250 sergeants and patrolmen, with an additional nine trucks and over 200 more personnel scheduled to be added in January 1930.

From its inception, the Emergency Service Unit had been under the control of precinct commanders, who lacked the training and expertise necessary for the efficient use of the unit's manpower and equipment. On April 10, 1930, Police Commissioner Grover A. Whalen issued General Order #20, which created the Emergency Service Division and placed it under the command of Inspector Daniel E. Kerr.

Since its inception, ESU and its predecessors had highly trained, well-armed and experienced officers who served as the NYPD's SWAT Team.

The Apprehension Tactical Team, or “A-Team” is ESU’s full-time high risk warrant service detachment formally organized within ESU in 1989, although many high risk warrants are also executed by the various ESU trucks stationed in the boroughs of New York City.

== Structure ==
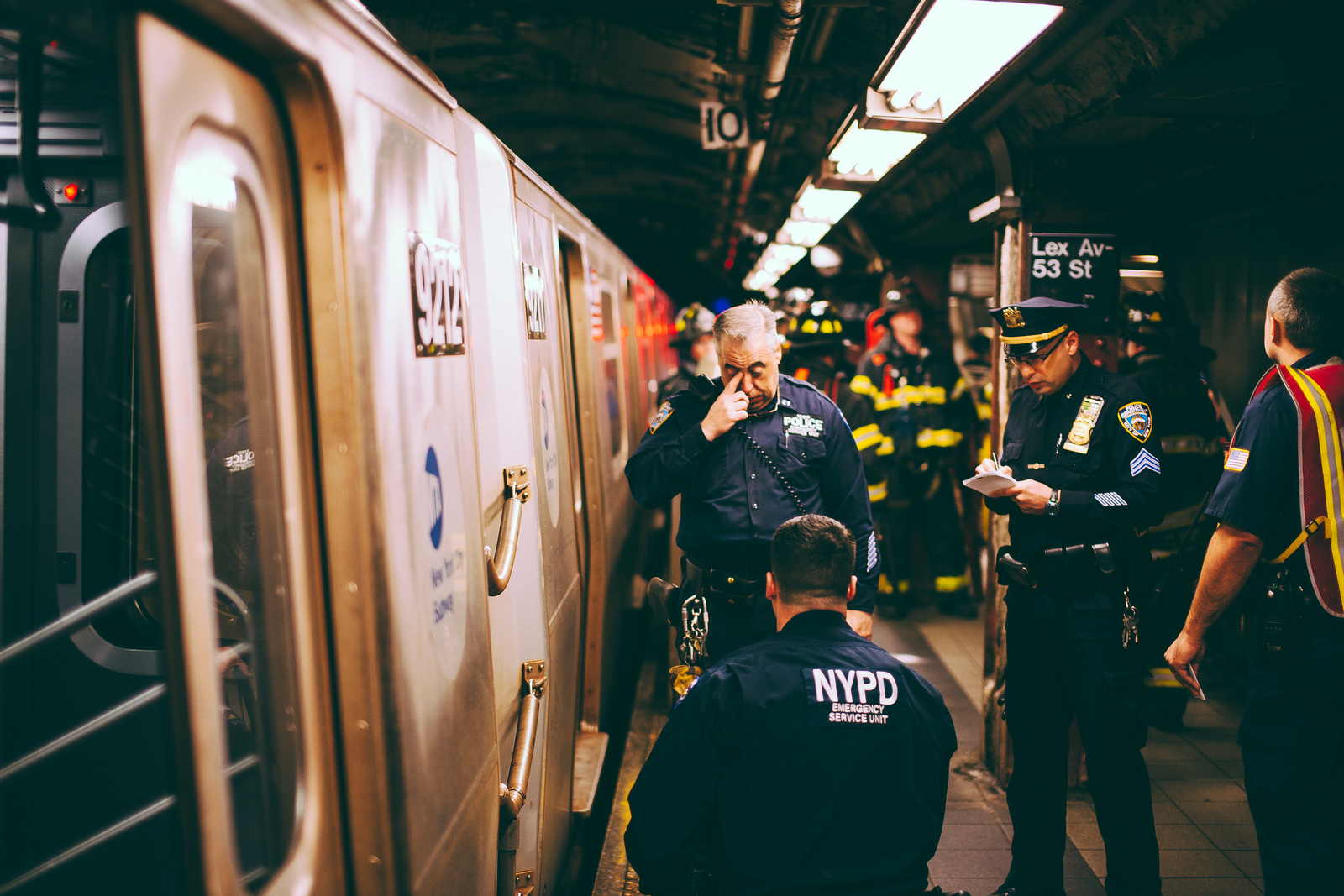
ESU officers investigating a subway suicide on the IND Queens Boulevard Line platforms at Lexington Avenue - 53rd Street in 2017

ESU is always on patrol (all three tours, 365 days a year) with ten Heavy Rescue trucks, each nominally carrying an ESU Detective and a sergeant, and often more than twice as many smaller Radio Emergency Patrol vehicles containing two ESU members. There are also two or more citywide patrol sergeants or lieutenants in unmarked vehicles on duty at all times to supervise ESU operations where needed. These are called "U-Cars" over NYPD radio; they patrol as either U-5 (Brooklyn, Queens, Staten Island) or U-4 (Manhattan, the Bronx) and respond to major incidents within their assigned boroughs for the tour.

=== Field organizations ===
The 10 Emergency Service Squads (ESS) or ("Trucks") are divided geographically as:

- Emergency Services Squad One (ESS-1) (Manhattan South)
- Emergency Services Squad Two (ESS-2) (Manhattan North)
- Emergency Services Squad Three (ESS-3) (Bronx South)
- Emergency Services Squad Four (ESS 4) (Bronx North)
- Emergency Services Squad Five (ESS-5) (Staten Island)
- Emergency Services Squad Six (ESS-6) (Brooklyn South)
- Emergency Services Squad Seven (ESS-7) (Brooklyn East)
- Emergency Services Squad Eight (ESS-8) (Brooklyn North)
- Emergency Services Squad Nine (ESS-9) (Queens South)
- Emergency Services Squad Ten (ESS-10) (Queens North)
- Emergency Services Squad Eleven (ESS-11) (Floyd Bennett Field) (support vehicle assigned to SOD/ESU headquarters)
- ESS-14 Hazmat/Rescue Truck
- Additional specialized vehicles strategically stored at designated squad locations

=== Apprehension Tactical Team ===
The Apprehension Tactical Team, referred to as the "A-Team", is ESU's full-time high risk search warrant team with citywide jurisdiction. A-Team members strictly perform tactical missions which, on a day-to-day basis, are typically high risk search warrants.

The Emergency Service Unit can be called upon to support any unit within the NYPD, as well as state and federal law enforcement and out-of-city law enforcement elsewhere in New York state and the New York metropolitan area if necessary. The NYPD Emergency Service Unit is widely considered to have the highest operational tempo of any SWAT unit in the United States, performing up to 4,500 callouts per year ranging from barricaded subjects to high risk search warrants, perpetrator searches, tactical interventions, counter assault team deployments, police support callouts, and jumper rescue scenarios.

=== Canine Team ===
The Canine Team has 44 police dogs that assist in searches for perpetrators and missing persons. The unit includes three bloodhounds and several dogs cross-trained in cadaver recovery. The ESU canines are an integral part of the US-TF1 Urban Search and Rescue (USAR) Team as deployed by the Federal Emergency Management Agency (FEMA).

=== Hazmat/Weapons of Mass Destruction Team ===
The Hazmat/Weapons of Mass Destruction Team is tasked with investigating and responding to any chemical, biological, radiological, nuclear and explosive (CBRNE) incidents. They also assist the Bomb Squad on explosive device callouts.

=== Emergency Medical Squad ===
The Emergency Medical Squad is tasked with providing care to NYPD officers and their families, alongside any other victims where required, during medical emergencies without having to wait for New York City Fire Department Bureau of EMS medics. Officers assigned to the Emergency Medical Squad are licensed EMTs with prior experience. They are headquartered in Queens.The Emergency Medical Squad is stocked with a wide variety of Specialized Medical Equipment including CPR Devices,Intubation and Airway Management Supplies,Cardiac Monitors and Defibrillators,Oxygen Support Equipment and other Specialized Medical Equipment.

== Vehicles ==
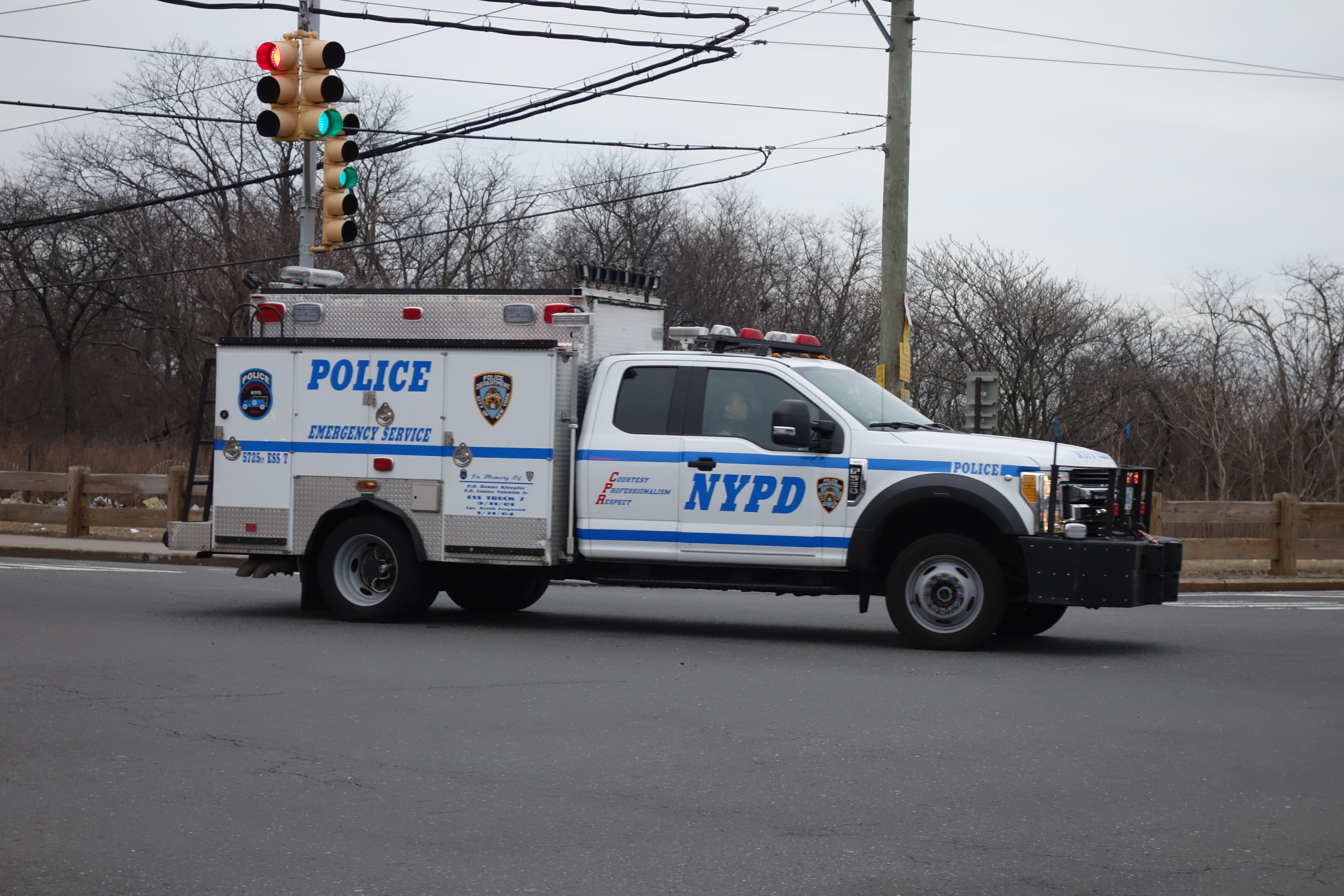
An ESU Ford F-550 Radio Emergency Patrol truck from ESS-7 in Brooklyn in 2019

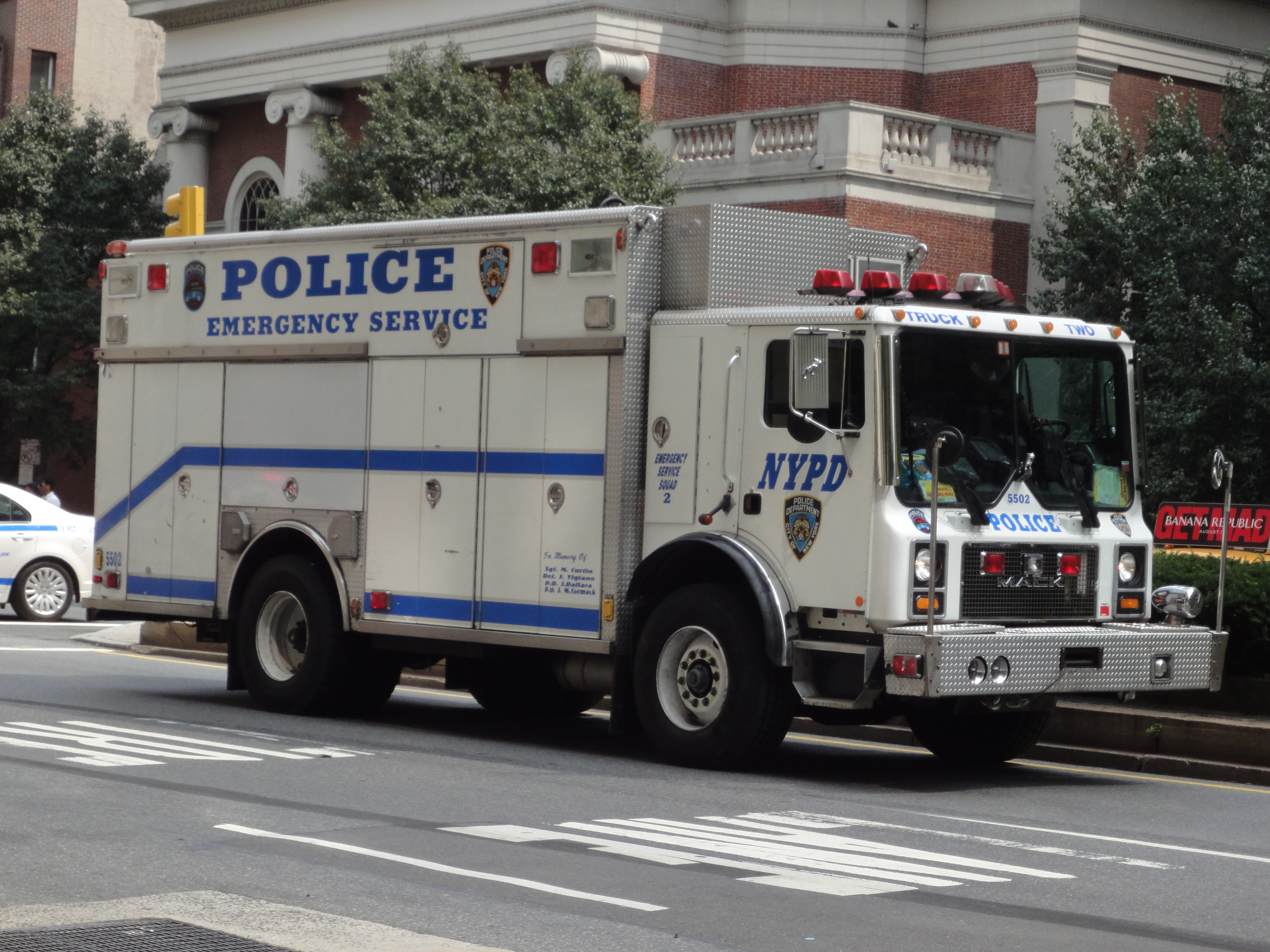
An ESU Mack MC/MR series Heavy Rescue truck from ESS-2 in Manhattan in 2012

ESU operates numerous special-purpose vehicles, including:

- 11 Heavy Rescue trucks, referred to as "Trucks", built by firefighting apparatus assembler E-One Inc. They serve as police equivalents to rescue vehicles of the kind operated by the New York City Fire Department.
- 55 Radio Emergency Patrol (REP) trucks, referred to as "REPs", built on Ford F-550 chassis. Each REP carries tactical and rescue equipment, emergency medical gear, forcible entry tools, and scuba equipment.
- Eight Lenco BearCat, two Lenco BEARs, two mine resistant armored personnel carriers MRAPs, and one armored BobCat or “Rook”, used as armored SWAT vehicles.
- Two ambulances operated by the Emergency Medical Squad.
- One mobile light generator truck, two 100 kW Mobile Auxiliary Light Trucks (MALTs), and several other 60 kW, 90 kW, 100 kW and 200 kW generators stationed throughout New York City.
- One Construction Accident Response Vehicle (CARV), a box truck carrying equipment used to stabilize structures and rescue trapped victims following construction accidents.
- Two Emergency Support Vehicle (ESV), a utility truck that can carry a rigid inflatable boat and a deployable rescue airbag.
- 12 Zodiac Nautic inflatable boats and 12 jet skis for marine capabilities.

== Recruitment ==
There are minimum time-in-grade requirements before an NYPD officer can apply to transfer to ESU. Police Officers must have a minimum of 5 years of patrol experience in the police department with a minimum annual rating of 4. Supervisors in the rank of sergeants and lieutenants must have 2 years in rank before being assigned to ESU. In addition, all ESU candidates must be approved by a group of current ESU members to ensure that they will integrate into the unit successfully.

Applicants have to complete the Specialized Training School over ten months receiving training in multiple disciplines including tactical training, search and rescue, hazardous materials mitigation and become certified in SCUBA diving and as an Emergency Medical Technician. Tactical training includes room clearing, team tactics and movements, counter assault team work, close quarter battle, active shooter, and months of specialized and heavy weapons training. ESU officers are equipped with the Colt M4 Commando rifle, the Heckler and Koch MP-5 submachine gun and the Glock 19 pistol. The Ruger Mini-14 and Ruger AC-556 are also used and favored by some ESU officers. Snipers are issued the Sako TRG M10 bolt action rifle.

== Casualties/line of duty deaths ==
ESU lost more members (14 out of 23 NYPD officers) than any other NYPD unit during the September 11 attacks.

== In popular culture ==
=== Books ===
- 330 Park by Stanley Cohen
- Sniper's Moon by Carsten Stroud
- E-Man: Life in the NYPD Emergency Service Unit by Al Sheppard
- NYPD – On the Streets with the Emergency Service Unit by Samuel Katz (1995)
- Anytime, Anywhere! by Samuel Katz (1997)
- Uncommon Valor: Insignia of the NYPD Emergency Service Unit by Andrew G. Nelson (2015)
- Uncommon Valor II: Challenge Coins of the NYPD Emergency Service Unit by Andrew G. Nelson (2017)
- Some Very Special Men – The Emergency Service to the Rescue by Cy Egan (1974)
- Police Emergency Squad No, 1 by Stephen H. Schwartz (1974)

=== Films ===
- Fourteen Hours (1951)
- Leon (1994) (also known as The Professional and Léon: The Professional)
- Godzilla (1998)
- The Bone Collector (1999)
- Bringing Out the Dead (1999)
- Phone Booth (2002)
- Madagascar (2005)
- Inside Man (2006)
- 16 Blocks (2006)
- World Trade Center (2006)
- The Day the Earth Stood Still (2008)
- Watchmen (2009)
- The Taking of Pelham 123 (2009)

=== Television series ===
- 24 (season 8 only, 2010)
- 3 Body Problem (2024)
- Elementary (2012–2019)
- Blue Bloods (2010–2024)
- Brooklyn Nine-Nine (2018)
- Castle (2009–2016)
- CSI: NY (2004–2013)
- Daredevil (2015)
- FBI: Most Wanted (Season 3, Ep.9 "Run-Hide-Fight". Some scenes)
- Homeland (2017)
- Law & Order (1990–2010, 2022–present), and its various spinoffs
  - Law & Order: Special Victims Unit, L&O: SVU (1999–present)
  - Law & Order: Criminal Intent, L&O:CI (2001–2011)
  - Law & Order: Trial by Jury, L&O:TBJ (2005–2006)
  - Law & Order: Organized Crime, L&O: OC (2021–present)
- Luke Cage (2016)
- Manifest (season 2) (E8) ESU assisting with Suicide Jumper
- NYPD Blue (1993–2005)
- Only Murders in the Building (season 1)
- Person of Interest (2011–2016)
- Third Watch (1999–2005)
- True Blue (1989–1990)
- The Blacklist (Season 6, 2019) ESU guards escorting Reddington

=== Video games ===
- Max Payne
- Payday: The Heist
- Payday 3
- SWAT 4

== See also ==
- LAPD Metropolitan Division
