= Vincent G. Danz =

Police officer and 9/11 victim

Vincent Danz
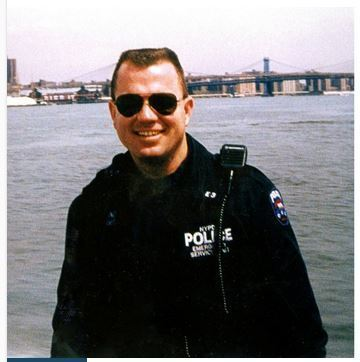
- Vincent Danz in his NYPD uniform
- Born: Vincent Gabriel Danz; February 26, 1963; Queens, New York
- Died: September 11, 2001 (aged 38); World Trade Center, New York City
- Cause of death: Collapse of the South Tower (September 11 attacks)
- Occupations: Police officer, Coast Guard sailor
- Known for: one of the first responders who was killed in the terrorist attack on September 11, 2001

Vincent Gabriel “Vinnie” Danz (February 26, 1963 – September 11, 2001) was a New York Police Department officer and a Port Security Specialist Second Class in the United States Coast Guard Reserve, who died responding to the terrorist attacks on the World Trade Center, on September 11, 2001.

== Police career ==
Danz joined the Police Department after serving in the United States Marine Corps. He had been a Police officer for 14 years. He started on bicycle patrol. He was a member of the Emergency Services Unit. On September 11, 2001, he was killed on duty when the South Tower of the World Trade Center collapsed.

== Legacy ==
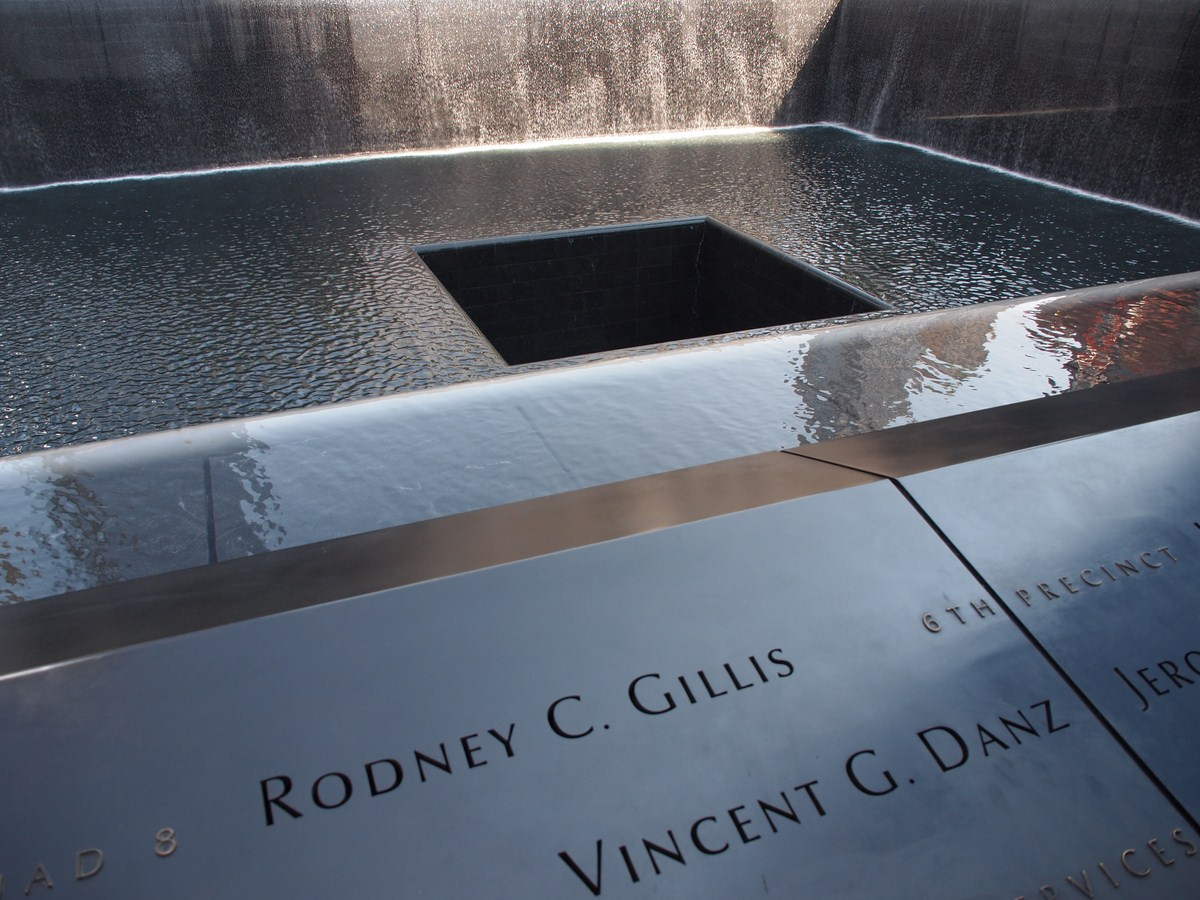
Danz's name on panel S-24 at the South Pool of National September 11 Memorial & Museum.

Danz was the first Police Officer who died in the attacks to have a memorial service. New York City Mayor Rudy Giuliani gave a eulogy.

In 2010, Charles "Skip" W. Bowen, who was then the Coast Guard's most senior non-commissioned officer, proposed that all the cutters in the Sentinel class should be named after enlisted sailors in the Coast Guard, or one of its precursor services, who were recognized for their heroism. On October 23, 2019, the Coast Guard announced that the 62nd Sentinel class cutter would be named the USCGC Vincent Danz.

On November 12, 2019, Karl Schultz, Commandant of the Coast Guard was joined by Bill de Blasio, Mayor of New York, James P. O'Neill, Police Commissioner, and John Sudnik, FDNY Fire Chief, to formally announce the ship's names.
