= 1901 New York City mayoral election =

- November 1901
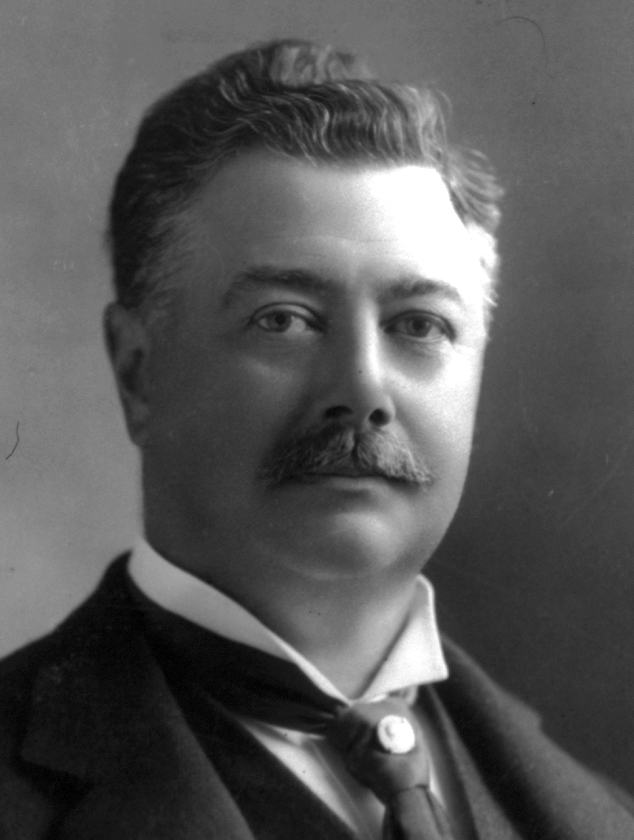

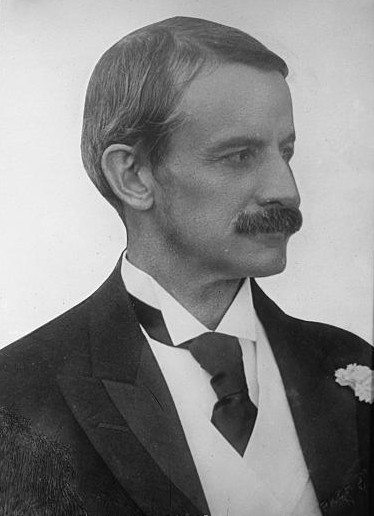
Nominee	Seth Low	Edward M. Shepard
Party	Republican	Democratic
Alliance	Fusion
Popular vote	296,813	265,177
Percentage	51.2%	45.8%
- Borough results Low: 40–50% 50–60% Shepard: 40–50%
Mayor before election
Robert A. Van Wyck
Democratic
Elected mayor
Seth Low
Republican

An election for Mayor of New York City was held in November 1901.

Incumbent mayor Robert A. Van Wyck was not a candidate for re-election to a second term in office. Republicans would not win a mayoral election in New York City again until 1933.

== Background ==
In the 1897 mayoral election, held in connection with the consolidation of the five boroughs of Greater New York, Robert Anderson Van Wyck was elected to a four-year term in office with the support of Tammany Hall. Van Wyck was initially quite popular as the result of his reversal of various reversals of reforms instituted by his reformist predecessor, William Lafayette Strong.

The Van Wyck administration was brought down in 1900 following a proposed doubling in the price of ice by the American Ice Company from 30 cents per hundred pounds to 60 cents. Before the invention of commercial refrigeration, ice was the only preservative available for food, milk, and necessary medicines; therefore, the proposed increase had potentially fatal implications.

In response to public outcry, a public investigation revealed that American Ice had secured a monopoly over the product through Tammany Hall maneuvering and that Van Wyck had been gifted over $680,000 ($21,602,562 in 2025) in company stock. The scandal destroyed Van Wyck's reputation and dramatically worsened the public standing of Tammany Hall, although a state investigation initiated by Governor Theodore Roosevelt later absolved Van Wyck of personal wrongdoing.

== General election ==
=== Candidates ===
- Ben Hanford, printer (Social Democratic)
- Benjamin F. Keinard (Socialist Labor)
- Seth Low, president of Columbia University, former mayor of Brooklyn, and Citizens' Union nominee for mayor in 1897 (Republican-Fusion)
- Edward M. Shepard, attorney and political reformer (Democratic)
- Alfred L. Manierre (Prohibition)

==== Results by borough ====
1901 New York City mayoral election
Party	Candidate	Votes	%
Republican	Seth Low	296,813	51.2%
Democratic	Edward M. Shepard	265,177	45.8%
Social Democratic	Ben Hanford	9,834	1.7%
Socialist Labor	Benjamin F. Keinard	6,213	1.1%
Prohibition	Alfred L. Manierre	1,264	0.2%
Total votes		579,301	100.00%
Republican gain from Democratic			

==== Results by borough ====
1901	Party	The Bronx and Manhattan	Brooklyn	Queens	Richmond [Staten Is.]	Total	%
Seth Low	Fusion	162,298	114,625	13,118	6,772	296,813	51.2%
Seth Low	Fusion	49.1%	55.0%	47.4%	51.9%	296,813	51.2%
Edward M. Shepard	Democratic	156,631	88,858	13,679	6,009	265,177	45.8%
Edward M. Shepard	Democratic	47.4%	42.7%	49.4%	46.1%	265,177	45.8%
Benjamin Hanford	Social Democratic	6,409	2,692	613	120	9,834	1.7%
Benjamin F. Keinard	Socialist Labor	4,323	1,638	181	71	6,213	1.1%
Alfred L. Manierre	Prohibition	617	501	74	72	1,264	0.2%
TOTAL		330,278	208,314	27,665	13,044	579,301

== Sources ==
- Carmer, Carl (1948). "From Van Wyck to O'Dwyer". In Nevins, Allan; Krout, John A. (eds.). The Greater City: New York, 1898-1948. New York: Columbia University Press. LCCN 48008678.
