= Roy W. Howard =

American newspaperman (1883–1964)

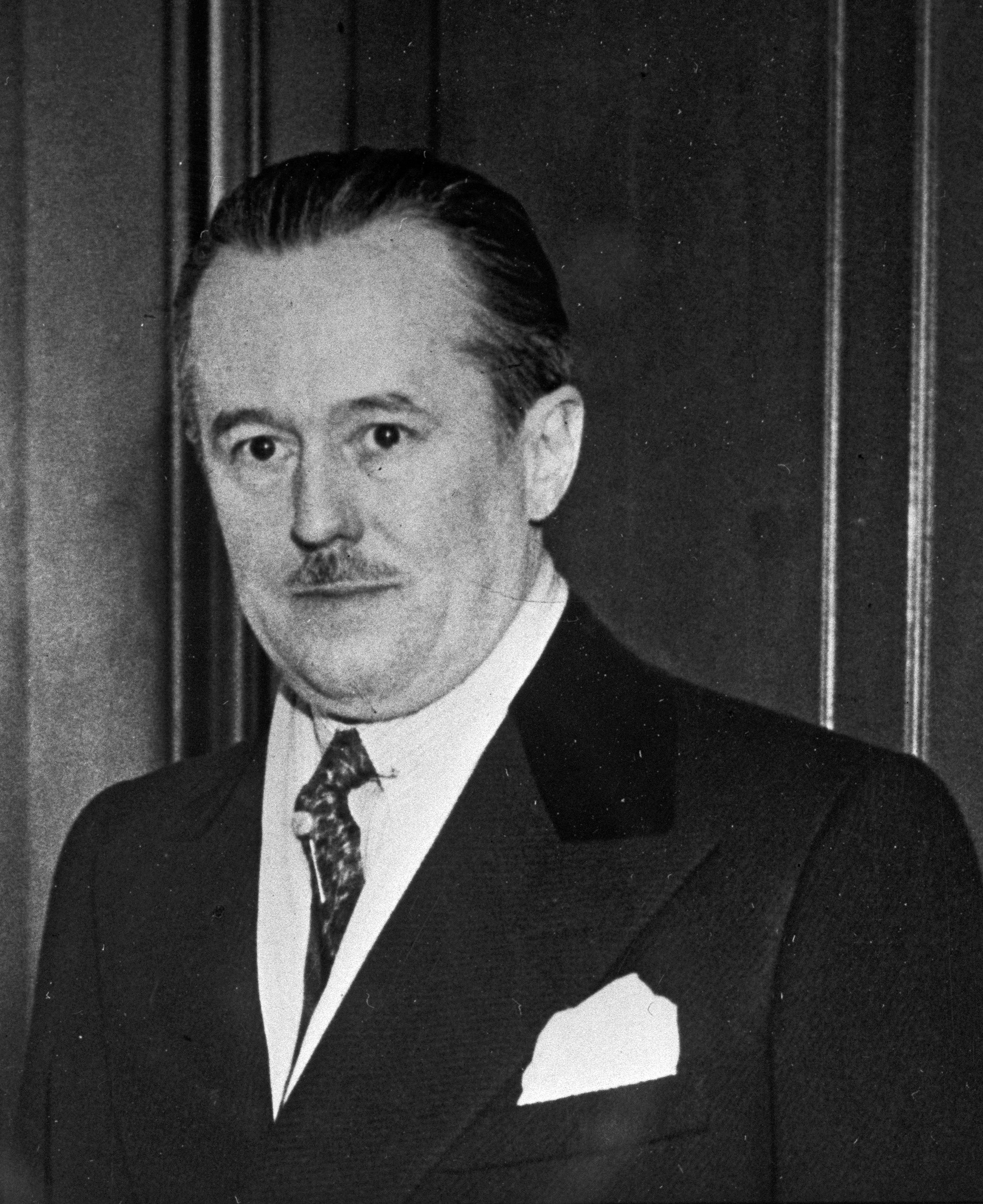
- Howard, 1920–1935
- Born: Roy Wilson Howard; January 1, 1883; Gano, Ohio, U.S.
- Died: November 20, 1964 (aged 81); New York City, U.S.
- Occupation: Newspaperman
- Employer: E. W. Scripps Company
- Known for: President of E. W. Scripps Company and United Press; Chairman of Scripps Howard Newspapers
- Children: Jack R. Howard

Roy Wilson Howard (January 1, 1883 – November 20, 1964) was an American newspaperman with a long association with E. W. Scripps Company. He was president of E. W. Scripps Company and the United Press, and chairman of Scripps Howard Newspapers.

== Biography ==
Born January 1, 1883, in Gano, Ohio, Howard began his newspaper career as a paperboy in Indianapolis, Indiana, but quickly moved up. He was a reporter for the Indianapolis Star and became New York correspondent for Scripps-McRae Newspapers. He quickly made a name for himself, and in 1912, worked his way up to president of United Press.

During World War I, Howard served as a war correspondent in Europe and accidentally sent a false report of the Armistice of 11 November 1918, four days prior to it actually being signed. Howard's reputation survived, and in 1917, he became a Scripps partner, whose name appeared in one of the Scripps subsidiary companies, the Scripps Howard News Service.

Howard moved to Scripps newspapers in 1920, and by 1922, he was leading E. W. Scripps Company, a position he kept for four decades. On November 3, 1922, the Scripps-McRae League was renamed Scripps-Howard Newspapers to recognize Howard.

Despite his management role, Howard continued to work as a reporter. In 1933, he went to Manchuria to cover the Sino-Japanese War and interviewed Puyi, the puppet emperor of Manchukuo. He also met with Japanese Emperor Hirohito. In 1936, he interviewed Joseph Stalin.

Howard died on November 20, 1964, aged 81, in New York City.

== See also ==
- Scripps Howard Foundation
