= USCGC Vincent Danz =

United States Coast Guard cutter

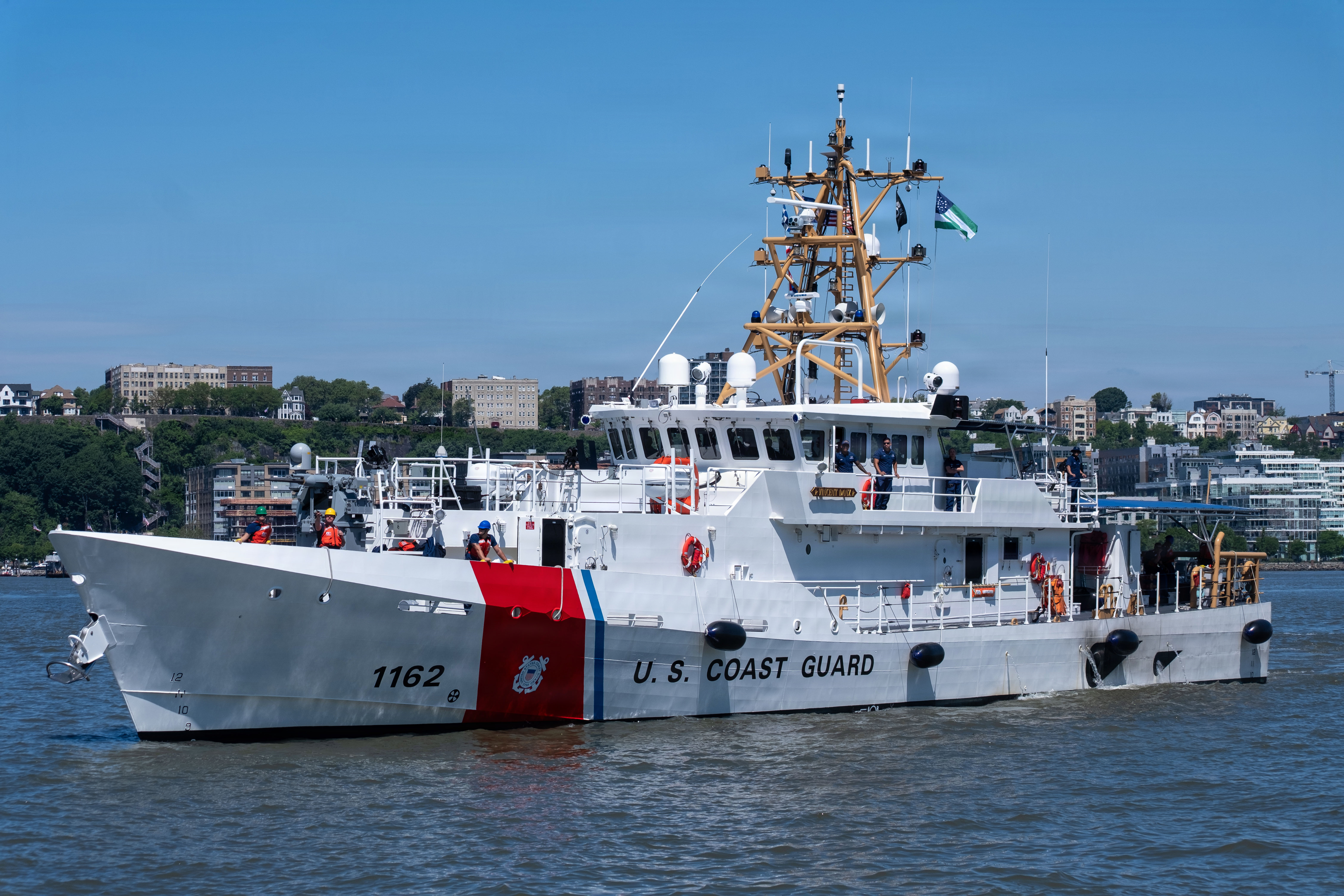
- USCGC Vincent Danz in 2026

United States
- Name: Vincent Danz
- Namesake: Petty Officer 2nd Class Vincent Danz
- Operator: United States Coast Guard
- Port of registry: Santa Rita, Guam
- Builder: Bollinger Shipyards, Lockport, Louisiana
- Acquired: February 26, 2026
- Commissioned: May 22, 2026
- In service: 2026
- Home port: Santa Rita, Guam
- Identification: Call sign: WPC-1162
- Motto: Never Forget
- Status: In service
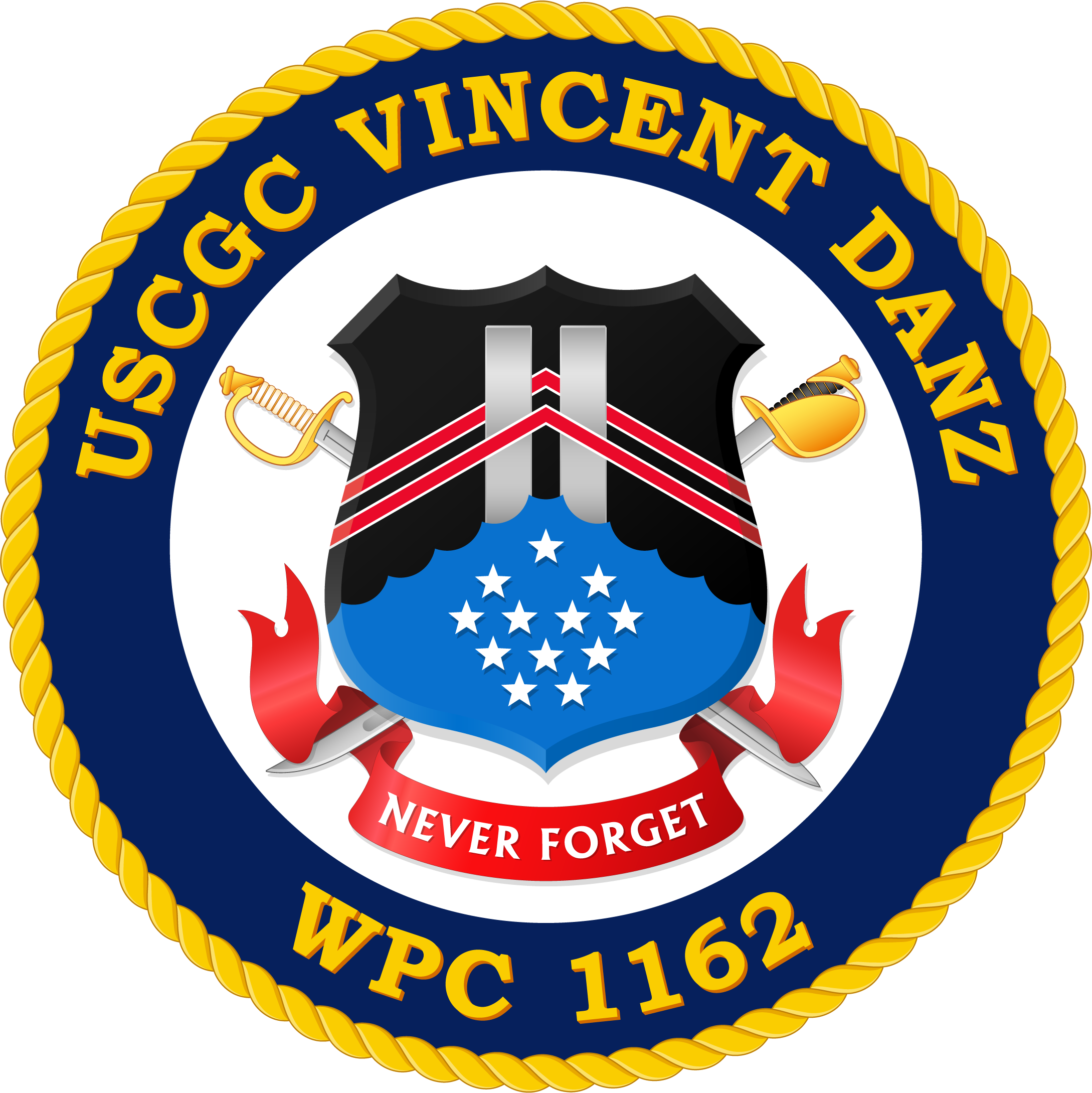
- Badge

General characteristics (as built)
- Type: Sentinel-class cutter
- Displacement: 353 long tons (359 t)
- Length: 154 ft (47 m)
- Beam: 25 ft (7.6 m)
- Draft: 9 ft 6 in (2.90 m)
- Speed: 28 knots (52 km/h; 32 mph)
- Crew: 24

USCGC Vincent Danz (WPC 1162) is a United States Coast Guard Fast Response Cutter (FRC) that was commissioned May 22, 2026 in New York City. Vincent Danz is a Sentinel-class FRC that is stationed in Guam. It is the 62nd cutter in this class. Her mission is maritime security, search and rescue and maritime law enforcement. Vincent Danz replaces an Island-class patrol boat.

== Namesake ==
The Sentinel-class FRCs are named after enlisted Coast Guardsmen of extraordinary service. Port Security Specialist 2nd Class Vincent G. Danz was a New York City police officer, U.S. Coast Guard reservist and Marine Corps veteran who was killed on September 11, 2001, when World Trade Center collapsed.

== General characteristics ==
Vincent Danz is 154 feet (47 m) long overall and with a beam of 25 ft (7.6 m). Her draft is 9 ft 6 in (2.90 m) and she displaces 353 long tons (359 t). She has a maximum speed of 28 knots (52 km/h; 32 mph) and a range of 2,500 nautical miles (4,600 km; 2,900 mi). The Vincent Danz has a crew of 24.

== Service history ==
On July 26, 2026, Vincent Danz arrived at Apra Harbor, Guam, for the first time and immediately joined the search for a missing boat which had been reported overdue at Ruo Island in the Federated States of Micronesia on July 24.
