= Parker Thomas Moon =

American political scientist

- Born: June 5, 1892; New York City, U.S.
- Died: June 11, 1936 (aged 44)
- Education: Columbia University (BS, PhD)
- Occupation: Political scientist

Parker Thomas Moon (June 5, 1892 – June 11, 1936) was an American political scientist who as an expert in international relations and researcher on international peace, participated in the U.S. delegation to the Paris Peace Conference in 1919 after World War I.

Moon was born in New York City in 1892, and graduated from high school in Yonkers in 1909. He attended Columbia University, where he was a member of the Philolexian Society, completing a Bachelor of Science degree in 1913 and a PhD in political science in 1921. He joined the faculty at Columbia in 1920 initially as a history instructor, but then became an assistant professor in international relations in 1925, an associate professor in 1926, and a full professor in 1931.

Moon was a member of a study group of academics established by President Woodrow Wilson in 1917, led by Wilson's foreign policy adviser Colonel Edward M. House, to prepare materials for postwar peace negotiations. Moon subsequently served in 1918 and 1919 on the American Commission to Negotiate Peace at the Paris Peace Conference, 1919.

A convert to Roman Catholicism, after the war Moon served as president of the American Catholic Historical Association in 1926, and as president of the Catholic Association for International Peace for several years. He was also editor of the journal Political Science Quarterly from 1928 to 1936.

== Works ==
Moon's published works included:

- The Labor Problem and the Social Catholic Movement in France (1921)
- Modern History (1923), co-written with Carlton J. H. Hayes
- Syllabus on International Relations (1925)
- Imperialism and World Politics (1926)
- Ancient and Medieval History (1929), co-written with Carlton J. H. Hayes
- Money and Credit in the Recovery Program (1934) (editor)
