= Amy Shearn =

American novelist

Amy Shearn (born 1979) is an American author of fiction, essays, poetry, and humor.

== Biography ==
Shearn's debut novel How Far Is The Ocean From Here was published by Shaye Areheart Books on July 22, 2008. Shearn's second novel The Mermaid of Brooklyn was released in the US on April 2, 2013, published by Touchstone, a division of Simon and Schuster. It was released in the UK on August 1, 2013 by Pan Macmillan.

Work by Shearn has been published in Jane Magazine, West Branch, Salt Hill, Opium, Lyric, 3rd Bed, Poets and Writers, Passages North, and the Found Magazine anthology Requiem for a Paper Bag. Shearn's non-fiction writing has appeared in The New York Times, Redbook, Real Simple, JSTOR, and many others. In addition to printed work, short fiction by Shearn has appeared on various literary websites including Brink, Sub-Lit, Gutcult, Five Chapters, Hobart, Nidus, and Elimae.

Shearn currently resides in Brooklyn, NY, and has taught writing at Gotham Writers' Workshop and NYU: SCPS.

== Selected works ==
Novel

- How Far Is The Ocean From Here (2008)
- The Mermaid of Brooklyn (2013)
- Unseen City (2020)
- Dear Edna Sloane (2024)
- Animal Instinct (2025)

Short stories

- Photo Me (Requiem for a Paper Bag: Celebrities and Civilians Tell Stories of the Best Lost, Tossed, and Found Items from Around the World (Found Anthology))
- The Suspension of Disbelief (Opium July 7, 2008)
- Questions and Answers from the Book of Knowledge (West Branch Fall / Winter 2005)
- Spare Parts
- The Kidnapped
- Arlen's Arm
- The Dogwalker
- The Burt Smithsons
- The News from Guthrie, Oklahoma
- Once We Had Hundreds of Chairs
