= George Vincent McLaughlin =

American police commissioner

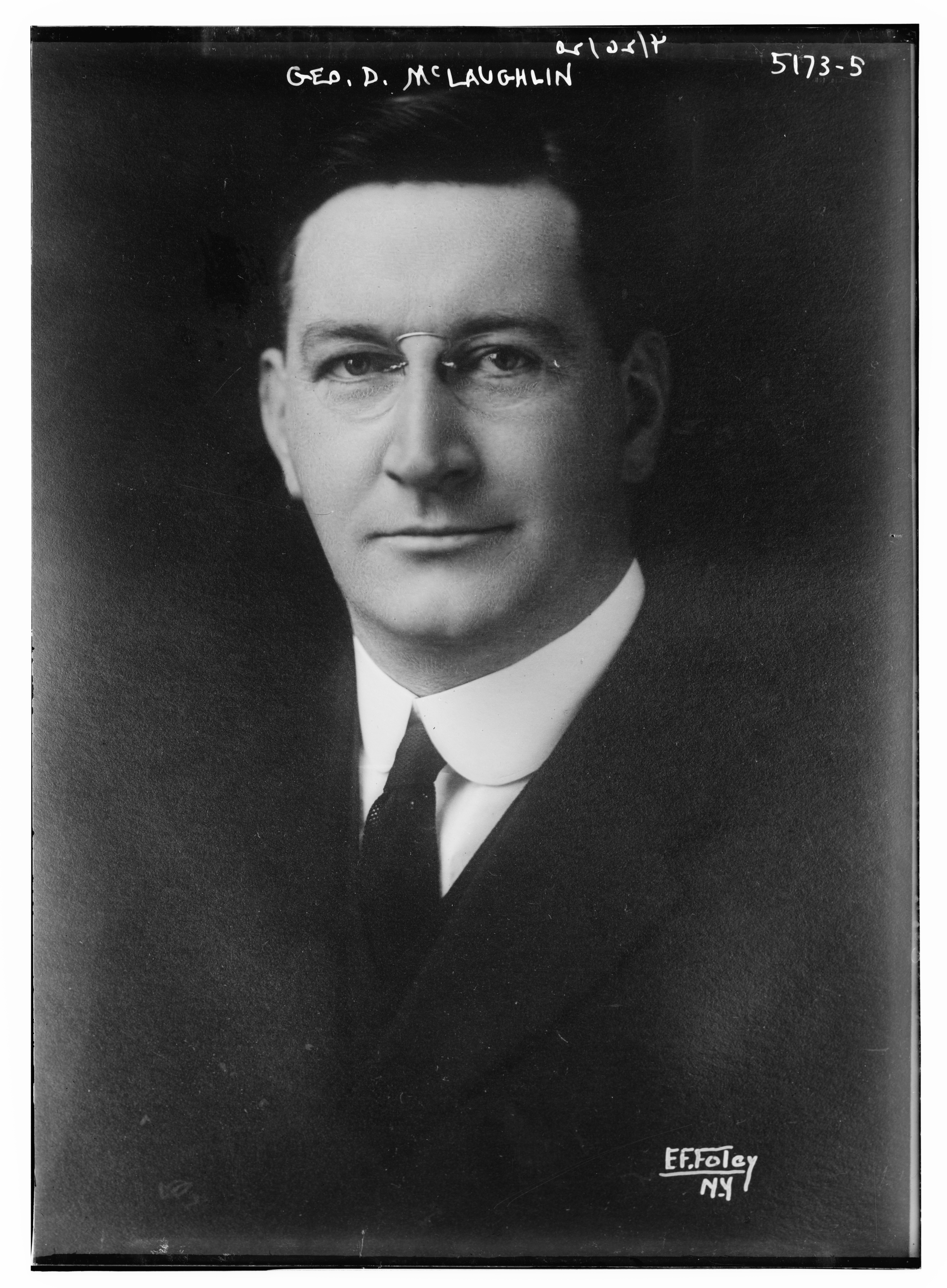

New York City Police Commissioner
- In office January 1, 1926 – April 12, 1927
- Appointed by: James John Walker
- Preceded by: Richard Edward Enright
- Succeeded by: Joseph A. Warren

President of the Brooklyn Trust Company
- In office 1940–?

Personal details
- Born: May 20, 1887
- Died: December 7, 1967 (aged 80)

George Vincent McLaughlin (May 20, 1887 – December 7, 1967) was superintendent of the New York State Banking Department in 1920. He was the New York City Police Commissioner from 1926 to 1927 and president of the Brooklyn Trust Company in 1940; and vice chairman of the Triborough Bridge and Tunnel Authority. McLaughlin was of Irish American heritage.

== Biography ==
He was born on May 20, 1887. He served as the New York City Police Commissioner from January 1, 1926 to April 12, 1927.

George, as president of the Brooklyn Trust Company brought Walter O'Malley into the financial arrangements for Ebbets Field in 1940. In 1947 he was awarded an honorary degree from Fordham University. He was a delegate to the 1952 Democratic National Convention for the 17th District. McLaughlin was a member of Robert Moses's Triborough Bridge and Tunnel Authority.

He died on December 7, 1967.

Police appointments
Preceded by Richard Edward Enright	New York City Police Commissioner; 1926-1927	Succeeded by Joseph A. Warren
