= Richard Enright =

American police commissioner (1871–1953)

Richard Edward Enright
- Enright in 1918

New York City Police Commissioner
- In office January 23, 1918 – December 30, 1925
- Appointed by: John Francis Hylan
- Preceded by: Frederick Hamilton Bugher
- Succeeded by: George Vincent McLaughlin

Personal details
- Born: Richard Edward Enright; August 30, 1871 Campbell, New York, U.S.
- Died: September 4, 1953 (aged 82) East Meadow, New York, U.S.
- Spouse: Jean Smith Enright
- Relations: Willian Enright (brother); Patrick Enright (brother)
- Occupation: Police officer, private detective

Richard Edward Enright (August 30, 1871 – September 4, 1953) was an American law enforcement officer, detective, and crime writer and served as NYPD Police Commissioner from 1918 until 1925. He was the first man to rise from the rank-and-file to assume command of the NYPD and, until the appointment of Lewis Joseph Valentine, he was the longest serving commissioner.

Although his eight-year tenure as commissioner received heavy criticism at the time of his resignation, mostly as the result of controversial actions of then-Mayor John F. Hylan, his accomplishments and successes were eventually recognized as valued contributions during his near 30-year service on the police force.

== Biography ==
=== Early life and police career ===
Richard Enright was born in Campbell, New York on August 30, 1871. He worked as a telegraph operator in Elmira and Queens before joining the New York City Police Department in 1896. He was described as being educated and very well-read, being able to recite poetry by heart, and was an avid student of art and history especially the life of Napoleon Bonaparte. A gifted and eloquent speaker, he became well liked by the men under his command.

He slowly rose through the ranks to police lieutenant and, although a public unknown, he was highly popular on the force as a champion for the rank-and-file officers while president of the Police Lieutenants' Benevolent Association. His popularity and pro-union views had a negative impact on his career however, most especially his criticism of the policies of the Mitchel administration, resulting in his being passed over for promotion to police captain three times "for the good of the service".

=== Rise to Police Commissioner ===
A change in administrations enabled Enright to succeed Frederick H. Bugher as Police Commissioner, becoming the first police officer to be appointed from within the ranks. Bugher had incurred the wrath of Mayor John Hylan for his resisting the mayor in his attempts to interfere with the police department by refusing to take "guidance". Enright proved to be more open to Mayor Hylan and was officially appointed commissioner on January 23, 1918. As time went on however, even Enright would reach his limits as the mayor continued in his efforts to control the police force.

As a result of Hylan's meddling, Enright became the scapegoat for the mayor's controversial decisions. One of the most serious criticisms was the virtually forced retirement of noted detective Daniel "Honest Dan" Costigan, then active in the Parkhurst vice investigations, who became the first of many old-time officers either transferred, demoted or forced into retirement. He was, however, able to effectively counter the manpower shortage and rising crime in the post-World War I period by creating old-style "strong-arm squads".

Enright specifically targeted illegal gambling establishments run by former U.S. Congressman and underworld figure "Honest" John Kelly, despite Kelly dying 35 years prior. During his first four years as police commissioner, assigned a uniformed patrolman to 24-hour watch outside Kelly's Vendome Club on West 141st Street. Enright's continued harassment of Kelly's operations eventually forced him to sell the building to a Republican political organization.

Enright was also able to institute a number of reforms and was greatly able to improve working conditions for police officers while in office. He allowed a day off for officers after every six days on duty, oversaw the buildup of large police relief funds and improved the pension system. He also reduced the number of precincts for better management, set up a special police unit to handle vice and gambling on a city-wide basis, reorganized the arrest-quota based merit system and established the first NYPD police camp at Tannersville, New York where ill or wounded officers could recover until they were able to return to duty. Other reforms he made included successfully petitioning the federal government to exempt police officers from being drafted, established the Missing Persons Bureau as a 24-hour service, and increased the number of policewomen on the force. He would, however, encounter heavy resistance in attempting to rid the department of corrupt and inefficient officers.

The International Police Conference was developed by Enright in order to promote greater international cooperation among the world's police forces. He also advocated universal fingerprinting registration, not only for crime prevention but to resolve any kind of identity question, as well as convicted criminals being required to pay damages to both the victim and police with money earned while in prison.

=== Prohibition, scandal and retirement ===
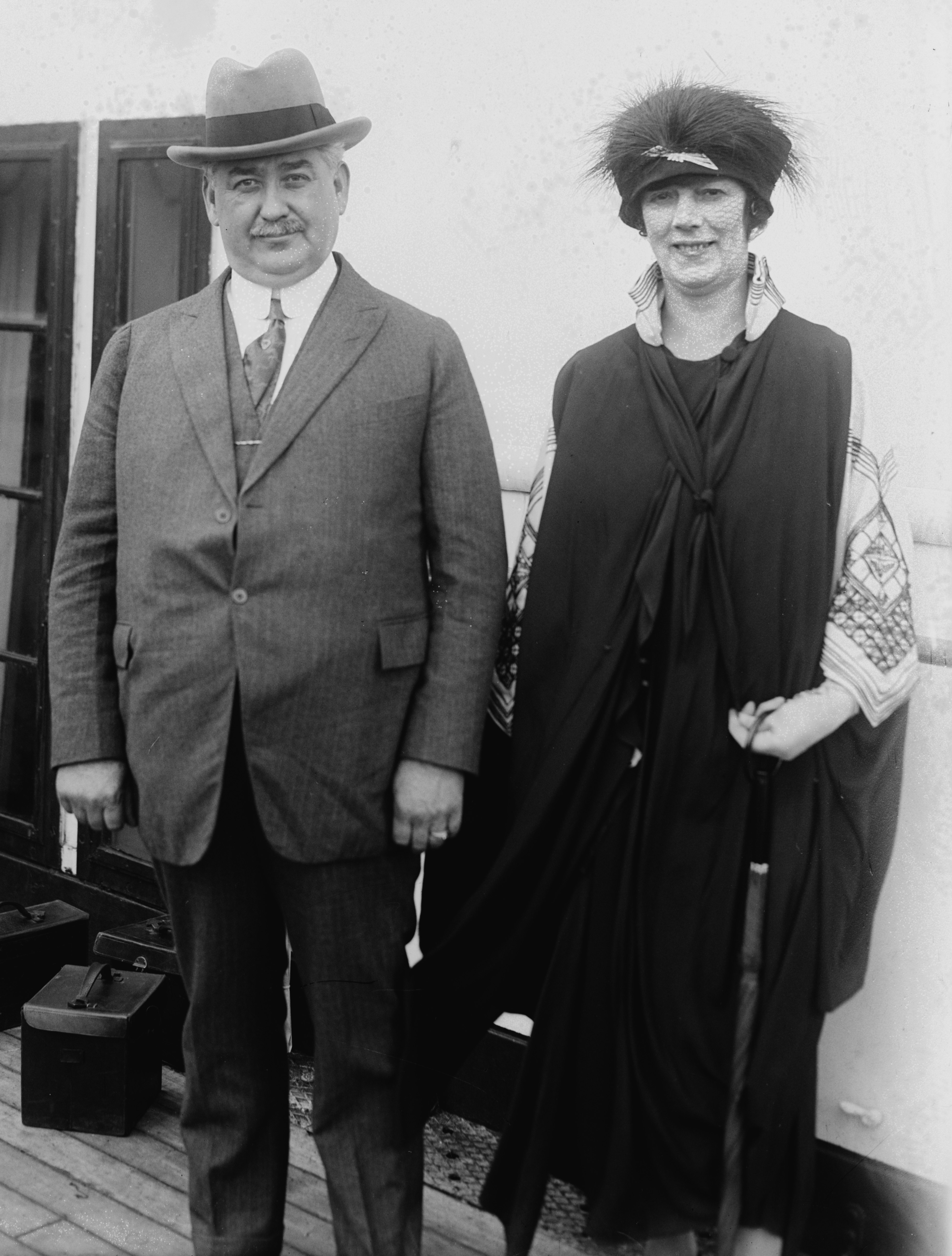
Enright in 1922 with his wife Jean Patterson Smith, whom he married in 1918

During the early years of Prohibition, the police force came under fire for widespread corruption and its ineffectiveness in the enforcement of the Volstead Act and the rising violence from the "Bootleg Wars". In 1921, a grand jury and Legislative investigation committee looked into the department's activities regarding graft and police corruption. Partially as a result of their findings, Enright's resignation was demanded by the Citizens Union and several newspapers. The next year, Enright issued libel suits against an assemblyman and city magistrate based on correspondence charging police bootleg grafting. Though he lost in both cases, he did receive an apology from the two men.

During Enright's tenure as commissioner, the country's first Shomrim Society, a fraternal organization of Jewish police officers, was founded in the NYPD in 1924. At the time, NYPD had 700 Jewish officers on the force.

Enright addressed the issue of Prohibition enforcement noting his embarrassment over the recent "crime waves". In 1924, Enright attempted to press charges against thirteen inspectors, a number of deputy inspectors and police captains for failing to enforce the Volstead Act, but was never able to establish his cases. In frustration, he resigned from the police force on December 30, 1925, the day before his term in office was to expire, presumably to become eligible for a police pension which he later received. At the time of his retirement, it was acknowledged that Enright had brought "a fair amount of professional knowledge and efficiency" during his time as commissioner.

He had a brief, but successful career as a crime writer the year following his departure from the police force. He had previously written a detective story, Inside the Net, while still in office and which was adapted to a motion picture in 1924. His first book, Vultures of the Dark, was published a year later and met with some commercial success. His second novel, The Borrowed Shield, failed to achieve the same success and Enright retired from writing soon after. His published a police manual that same year entitled Syllabus and Instruction Guide of the Police Academy.

=== Later years ===
In the years following his retirement, he served as a colonel in the Army Reserves, briefly published a pulp magazine and had an interest in automatic alarm signals for stores and businesses. In 1933, Enright was employed by the federal government during the Great Depression to set up an enforcement division for the National Recovery Administration. He also became the director of the United Service Detective Bureau, a position he held until his death. In 1947, he petitioned the Police Pension Fund to increase his pension from $3,750 to $6,000 but was rejected.

On the evening of September 3, 1953, the 82-year-old Enright suffered a serious spinal injury when he fell at the Clocks Boulevard home of a female friend, Mrs. Mary D. Beal, in Massapequa, Long Island. He was taken to Meadowbrook Hospital where he died of his injuries the following day. Enright was survived by his brother, Patrick Enright; and five nephews.

== In culture and the arts ==
In 1925, Enright was presented with a bust portrait by the sculptor Paolo S. Abbate, which was later described as one of the artist's better-known works while it was on exhibition at the New York City Hall in 1962. The bust by Abbate was featured on season 25 of the Antiques Roadshow. The episode, which aired on 24 May 2021, detailed how American humorist and journalist Mo Rocca had purchased the sculpture erroneously believing it to be a likeness of the American president Grover Cleveland. At the time of taping, appraiser Eric Silver of Lillian Nassau LLC was not able to identify the sitter or the artist. After the episode aired, viewers were able to assist in re-identifying the sculpture.

The Lloyd Sealy Library of the John Jay College of Criminal Justice in New York City holds two drawings of Enright, dating from 1924 and 1929.

== Bibliography ==
=== Books ===
- Syllabus and Instruction Guide of the Police Academy (1925)

=== Articles ===
- Police Commissioner Richard E. Enright Replies to His Critics: No "Crime Wave" in New York City New York Times. (January 1921)
- "Enright Proposes Civic Center for City. He Would Use Twelve Blocks Above North End of Central Park. Project for a Great Municipal Site is Linked with Plan to Relieve Traffic Congestion in Lower Manhattan: He Would Use Twelve Blocks Above North End of Central Park" New York Times. (May 1924)
- "Everybody Should Be Fingerprinted". Scientific American. (October 1925)

=== Fiction ===
- Into the Net (1924)
- Vultures of the Dark (1925)
- The Borrowed Shield (1925)

=== Speeches ===
- Tribute by Police Commissioner Richard E. Enright at Unveiling of Monument Dedicated to Reverend Francis J. Sullivan, Late Chaplain of the Police Department, at Calvary Cemetery, June 23, 1918 (1918)
- Address of Richard E. Enright, Police Commissioner: At the Dinner of the Mayor's Public Welfare Committee, at the Waldorf-Astoria, October 6, 1920 (1920)
- Address of Police Commissioner Richard E. Enright, Before the Motor Truck Association, October 27, 1920 (1920)
- Address by Richard E. Enright, Police Commissioner Delivered at the Dinner of the Casualty and Surety Club of New York, November 4, 1920 (1920)
- Address by Police Commissioner Richard E. Enright to the Kings County Grand Jurors Association: January 14, 1921 (1921)
- Address by Police Commissioner Richard E. Enright to the New York Methodist Preachers, May 2, 1921 (1921)
- Address by Police Commissioner Richard E. Enright at Dinner to His Excellency, the Peruvian Ambassador, Dr. Hernan Velarde, Hotel Plaza, January 29, 1925 (1925)
- Speech of Police Commissioner Richard E. Enright Before the Kings County Grand Jurors' Association, June 19, 1925 (1925)

=== Radio ===
- $10,500 Reward: The City of New York Offers $10,500 Reward for the Arrest and Furnishing of Evidence Sufficient to Warrant and Secure the Conviction of the Person Or Persons Guilty of Causing Or Perpetrating the Disastrous Explosion on September 16, 1920, on Wall Street Near Broad Street (1920)
- "Traffic Problems"... Address of Police commissioner Richard E. Enright: By radio on police problems. First subject, September 5, 1923 (1923)
- "National Police Bureau" ... Address of Police commissioner Richard E. Enright: By radio on police problems. Second subject, September 12, 1923 (1923)
- "The Uniformed Force" ... Address of Police commissioner Richard E. Enright: By radio on police problems. Third subject, September 18, 1923 (1923)
- "Detective Bureau" ... Address of Police commissioner Richard E. Enright: By radio on police problems. Fourth subject, September 25, 1923 (1923)
- "Crime Prevention" ... Address of Police commissioner Richard E. Enright: By radio on police problems. Fifth subject, October 2, 1923 (1923)
- "Truth Versus Fiction" in Modern Detective Service ... Address of Police commissioner Richard E. Enright: By radio on police problems. Sixth subject, October 16, 1923 (1923)
- "Prohibition" ... Address of Police commissioner Richard E. Enright: By radio on police problems. Seventh subject, October 23, 1923 (1923)
- "Police Problems - Answers" ... Address of Police commissioner: By radio on police problems. Eighth subject, October 30, 1923 (1923)

== See also ==
- New York City Police Department
- Sergeants Benevolent Association

Police appointments
Preceded by Frederick H. Bugler	NYPD Commissioner; 1918-1925	Succeeded by George V. McLaughlin
