= John P. O'Brien =

American politician (1873–1951)

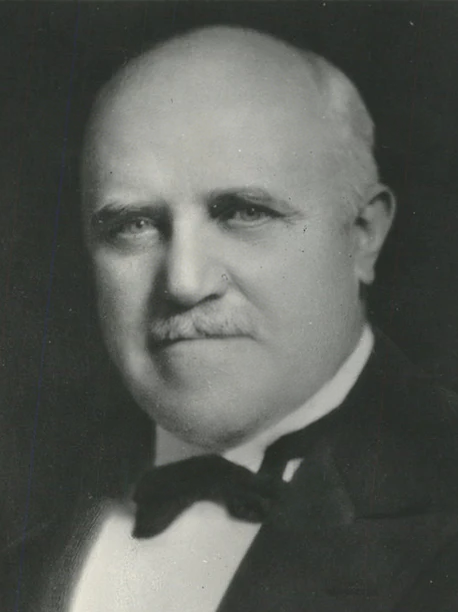
- O'Brien in 1923

99th Mayor of New York City
- In office January 1, 1933 – December 31, 1933
- Preceded by: Joseph V. McKee (acting)
- Succeeded by: Fiorello H. La Guardia

Personal details
- Born: John Patrick O'Brien; February 1, 1873 Worcester, Massachusetts, U.S.
- Died: September 22, 1951 (aged 78) New York City, New York, U.S.
- Party: Democratic
- Spouse: Helen E.C. Madigan
- Education: College of the Holy Cross (BA); Georgetown University (AM, LLB)
- Profession: Attorney

John Patrick O'Brien (February 1, 1873 – September 22, 1951) was an Irish-American attorney and Democratic politician who served as the 99th Mayor of New York City from January 1 to December 31, 1933. Born in Worcester, Massachusetts, to Irish immigrant parents, he earned degrees from the College of the Holy Cross and Georgetown University before moving into municipal law and judicial service in New York. Backed by the Tammany Hall political machine, he won a special election following the resignation of Jimmy Walker and served a single year in office, during which he worked to stabilize the city's finances amidst the Great Depression. He was defeated for re-election and returned to private practice.

== Life and career ==
O'Brien was born on February 1, 1873, to Mary and Patrick O'Brien, Irish immigrants in Massachusetts. He received his B.A. from College of the Holy Cross and his masters and law degree from Georgetown University. He later served as New York City Corporation Counsel and as a New York Surrogate Court judge.

Shortly after the surprise resignation of Mayor Jimmy Walker in 1932, Tammany Hall nominated O'Brien for mayor in a special election, and he beat write-in candidate (and Acting Mayor) Joseph V. McKee by more than half a million votes. O'Brien's inauguration was held in the Hall of Records, at 31 Chambers Street in Manhattan, and was devoid of the pageantry that had greeted many of his predecessors. His inauguration speech did not outline a vision for the city, but rather, reflected on the work of the court and the legal profession in general. In the post inauguration news conference, the new mayor was asked who would be the new police commissioner. "I don't know," O'Brien answered. "They haven't told me yet."

Although he is credited with expanding the city's ability to collect taxes, restoring order to the city's finances, and trimming the budget, O'Brien was defeated for re-election in a three-way race by the colorful Republican-City Fusion Party candidate, Fiorello H. La Guardia, in November 1933. He served just one year in office.

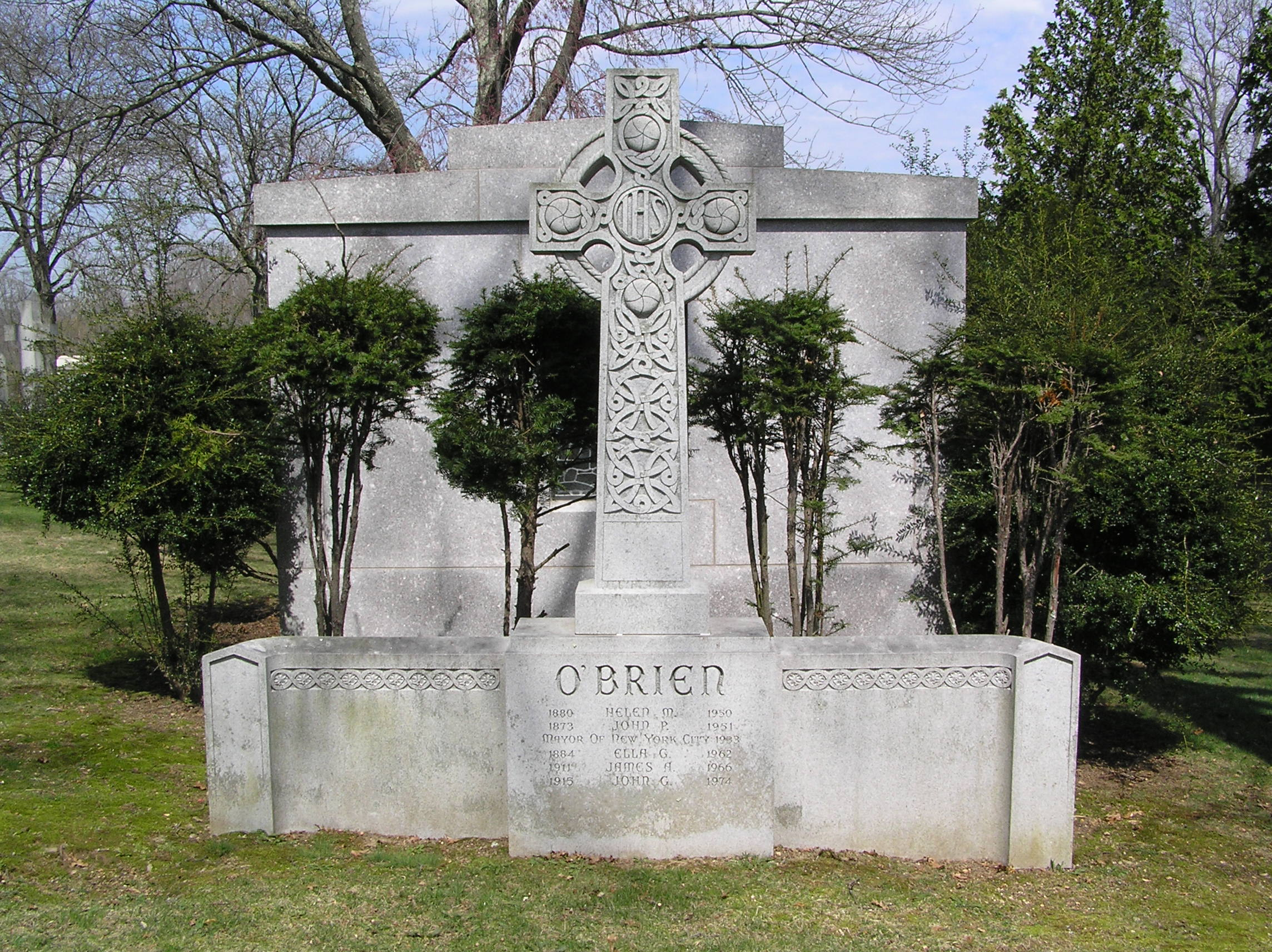
The grave of Mayor John P. O'Brien in Gate of Heaven Cemetery

O'Brien returned to his legal work and served three times as a delegate to the Democratic National Convention. He died on September 21, 1951, at his home at 40 East 75th Street at 7:25 p.m in Upper East Side, Manhattan. He was buried in the Gate of Heaven Cemetery in Hawthorne, Westchester County.

== Family ==
O'Brien married Helen E. C. Madigan (c. 1875–1950) in 1908, and their children include Gerard J. O'Brien, James A. O'Brien, Lawrence J. O'Brien, John G. O'Brien, and a daughter Helen Elizabeth, who married Victor E. Forker.

== See also ==
- List of mayors of New York City

Political offices
Preceded by Joseph V. McKee	Mayor of New York City; 1933	Succeeded by Fiorello H. La Guardia
