= Gano, Ohio =

Unincorporated community in Ohio, U.S.

Coordinates: 39°18′08″N 84°24′30″W

Gano is an unincorporated community in West Chester Township, Butler County, in the U.S. state of Ohio.

== History ==
Gano was platted in 1874 by Charles Gano, and named for him. A post office was established at Gano in 1872, and it was discontinued in 1910.
