= Joseph A. Warren =

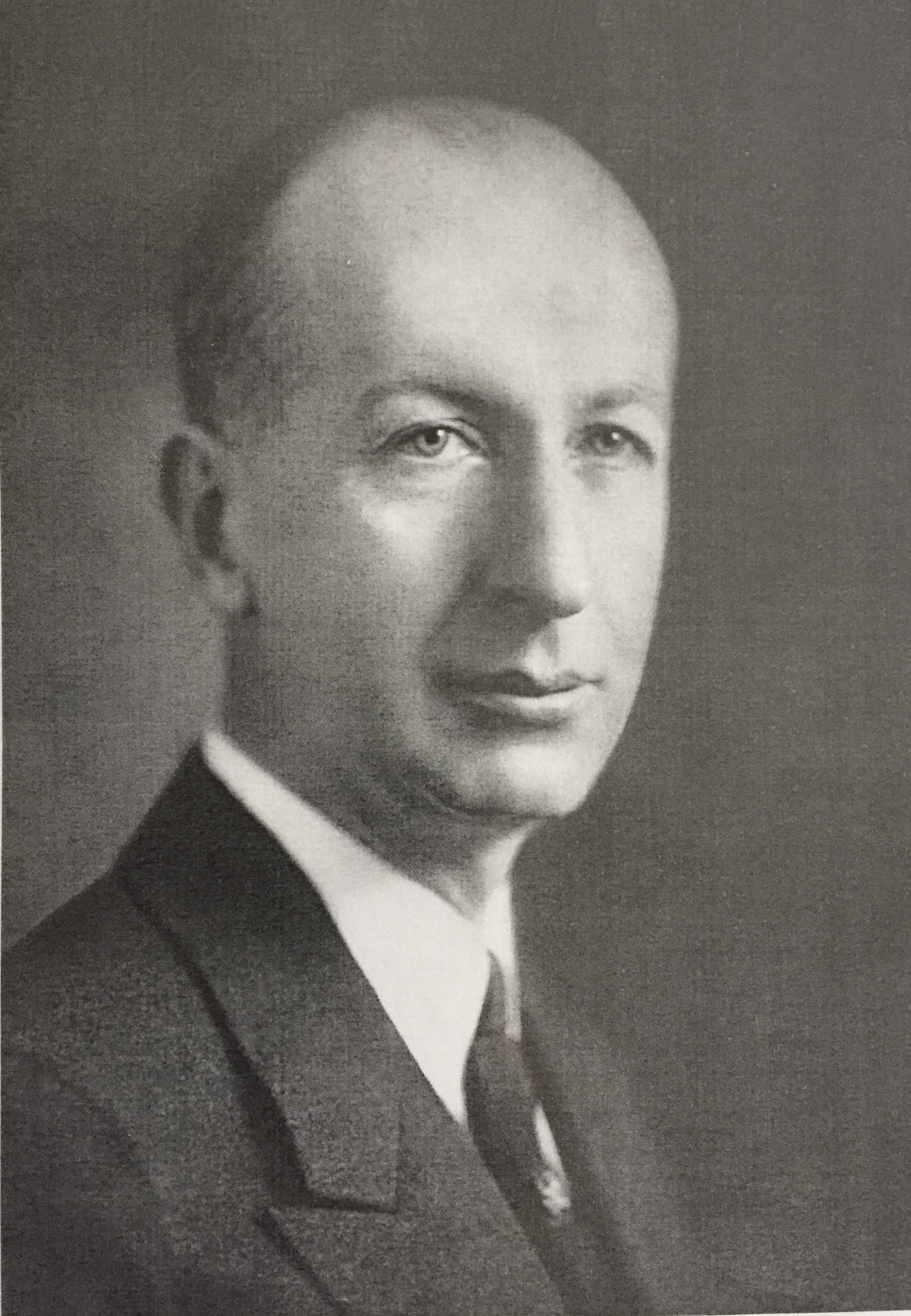
Joseph Aloysius Warren - NYC Police Commissioner (April 12, 1927 – December 18, 1928).

Joseph Aloysius Warren (April 19, 1882 - August 12, 1929) - New York City Police Commissioner (April 12, 1927 – December 18, 1928).

== Biography ==
Warren was born April 19, 1882, in Jersey City, NJ, the eldest son of Joseph Warren, a successful Jersey City real estate businessman born in Drogheda, Co. Meath, Ireland, and his wife Ellen (née Grady) Warren.

A life-long friend and former law partner of Mayor Jimmy Walker, Warren became the second of four police commissioners appointed by Walker during a turbulent period in New York City history marred by the proliferation of prohibition-linked organized crime. Initially hailed by Mayor Walker as the ideal man for the job. Warren's tenure was cut short after only 20 months, following a number of unsolved NYPD murder investigations, most notably including the highly publicized Arnold Rothstein murder investigation of November 1928.

In accepting Warren's resignation in December 1928 the mayor praised Warren as an honest public servant.

== Death ==
Warren succumbed to mental illness only nine months later on August 13, 1929, in a Greenwich, CT sanitarium, an apparent victim to the rigors of his former office.
