= Clarence J. Shearn =

American judge

Clarence John Shearn
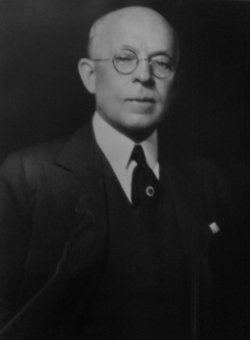
- Shearn as justice of the New York State Supreme Court 1914
- Born: Leeds, Massachusetts
- Died: February 12, 1953; New York City, New York
- Occupations: lawyer, judge
- Employer: New York State Supreme Court
- Spouse: Eva Petty Shearn

Clarence John Shearn (1869 – February 12, 1953) was a prominent New York City lawyer and judge and who served as president of the New York City Bar Association from 1935 to 1937.

== Life ==
Shearn was born in Leeds, Massachusetts in 1869. He graduated from Cornell University in 1890 and New York Law School in 1893, and was admitted that year to the New York bar.

Shearn began a highly successful private practice in 1893, and soon became an attorney for William Randolph Hearst. With Hearst’s backing, Shearn unsuccessfully ran for New York County District Attorney in 1905 and Governor of New York in 1908 on the Independence Party ticket.

In 1914 Shearn was appointed as a justice of the New York State Supreme Court for the First District, based in Manhattan. In 1916, he was elevated by Governor Charles S. Whitman to the Appellate Division, First Department, where he served until 1919. In 1919 he left to pursue private practice with the law firm Shearn & Hare.

In 1924 Shearn was counsel for the Transit Commission in the New York City Subway investigation conducted for Governor Al Smith by Supreme Court Justice John V. McAvoy, who found Mayor John F. Hylan responsible for subway congestion and exonerated the Transit Commission. In 1928 he was Governor Smith’s commissioner in an investigation of the Queens sewer system that resulted in the conviction of Queens Borough President Maurice E. Connolly of conspiracy to defraud the city. As president of the New York City Bar Association from 1935 to 1937, Shearn was an initiator of the investigation into the ambulance-chasing racket. In 1938, William Randolph Hearst appointed him a voting trustee to reorganize the vast Hearst publishing and business holdings.

Shearn died of a cerebral hemorrhage on February 12, 1953 at the age of 83 in New York City.
