= List of Wiltshire County Cricket Club List A players =

Wiltshire County Cricket Club was formed in 1893, and first competed in the Minor Counties Championship in 1897. They have appeared in twenty-two List A matches, making five Gillette Cup, ten NatWest Trophy and six Cheltenham & Gloucester Trophy appearances. The players in this list have all played at least one List A match. Wiltshire cricketers who have not represented the county in List A cricket are excluded from the list.

Players are listed in order of appearance, where players made their debut in the same match, they are ordered by batting order. Players in bold have played first-class cricket.

== Key ==
**General**

- ♠ – Captain
- † – Wicket-keeper
- **First** – Year of debut for Wiltshire
- **Last** – Year of latest match played for Wiltshire
- **Mat** – Number of matches played for Wiltshire
- **Win%** – Winning percentage

**Batting**

- **Inn** – Number of innings batted
- **NO** – Number of innings not out
- **Runs** – Runs scored in career
- **HS** – Highest score
- **100** – Centuries scored
- **50** – Half-centuries scored
- **Avg** – Runs scored per dismissal
- * – Batsman remained not out

**Bowling**

- **Balls** – Balls bowled in career
- **Wkt** – Wickets taken in career
- **BBI** – Best bowling in an innings
- **BBM** – Best bowling in a match
- **Ave** – Average runs per wicket

**Fielding**

- **Ca** – Catches taken
- **St** – Stumpings effected

== List of players ==
No.	Name	Nationality	First	Last	Mat	Batting			Bowling				Fielding	
No.	Name	Nationality	First	Last	Mat	Runs	HS	Avg	Balls	Wkt	BBI	Ave	Ca	St
1	**David Green**	England	1964	1964	1	0	0	0.00	0	0	–	–	0	0
2	Peter Russell	England	1964	1964	1	8	8	8.00	0	0	–	–	1	0
3	James Hurn	England	1964	1964	1	8	8	8.00	0	0	–	–	0	0
4	**Anthony Smith**	England	1964	1969	3	46	34	15.33	156	1	1/46	83.00	1	0
5	Basil Chivers	England	1964	1964	1	0	0	0.00	0	0	–	–	0	0
6	David Richards ♠	England	1964	1965	2	11	11	5.50		0	–	–	1	0
7	**Michael Hanna** †	England	1964	1965	2	5	4	2.50	0	0	–	–	0	0
8	Michael Martin	England	1964	1965	2	1	1	0.50	88	2	2/46	31.50	1	0
9	John Savin	England	1964	1973	3	21	18	7.00	162	1	1/46	111.00	1	0
10	**Anthony Marshall**	England	1964	1969	3	41	31*	20.50	228	3	3/36	33.33	0	0
11	James Merryweather	England	1964	1973	5	6	4*	–	276	9	3/41	13.66	3	0
12	David Gardner	England	1965	1969	2	31	20	15.50	0	0	–	–	1	0
13	David Essenhigh	England	1965	1969	2	20	19	10.00	1	0	–	–	0	0
14	**Ian Lomax** ♠	England	1965	1969	2	113	63	56.50	72	0	–	–	1	0
15	Philip Hough	England	1965	1965	1	25	25	25.00	0	0	–	–	0	0
16	Brian White ♠	England	1965	1990	9	79	29	8.77	0	0	–	–	1	0
17	**Andrew Barker**	England	1969	1973	3	40	19	13.33	24	0	–	–	0	0
18	Richard Gulliver ♠	England	1969	1983	4	34	15	8.50	196	3	1/24	43.66	0	0
19	James Ridge	England	1969	1973	3	12	10	4.00	66	0	–	–	0	0
20	David Simpkins †	England	1969	1973	2	7	5	3.50	0	0	–	–	1	1
21	John Livermore	England	1969	1969	1	2	2	2.00	66	0	–	–	0	0
22	**Bill Smith**	England	1972	1973	2	14	12	7.00	0	0	–	–	0	0
23	**Terry Barwell**	England	1972	1973	2	16	9	8.00	0	0	–	–	1	0
24	Martin Scott †	England	1972	1972	1	0	0	0.00	0	0	–	–	0	0
25	Paul Meehan	England	1972	1988	4	38	20	9.50	144	2	1/61	79.00	0	0
26	John Alford	England	1972	1973	2	13	8	6.50	90	2	2/29	18.00	0	0
27	**Philip Thorn** ♠	England	1983	1984	2	15	15	7.50	102	1	1/47	79.00	0	0
28	**Richard Cooper** ♠	England	1983	1989	4	35	15	8.75	168	4	2/38	42.00	0	0
29	Jeremy Newman	England	1983	1989	5	102	62	25.50	0	0	–	–	1	0
30	David Mercer	England	1983	1988	3	16	13	5.33	0	0	–	–	2	0
31	Gerald Meale †	England	1983	1984	2	19	19	19.00	0	0	–	–	0	2
32	Russell Wilson	England	1983	1983	1	9	9*	–	18	0	–	–	0	0
33	Terry Barnes	England	1983	1984	2	13	13	13.00	138	3	2/95	52.33	0	0
34	**Robert Lanchbury**	England	1984	1987	2	54	40	27.00	0	0	–	–	1	0
35	**Mohinder Amarnath**	India	1984	1984	1	3	3	3.00	72	1	1/39	39.00	0	0
36	**David Simpkins**	England	1984	1993	5	117	48	29.25	198	2	2/33	61.50	3	0
37	John Spencer	England	1984	1984	1	0	0	–	72	4	4/82	20.50	0	0
38	Jeffrey Cullip †	England	1987	1988	2	12	9	6.00	0	0	–	–	2	0
39	**Christopher Trembath**	England	1987	1987	1	4	4	4.00	30	0	–	–	0	0
40	**John Inchmore**	England	1987	1987	1	3	3	3.00	72	2	2/62	31.00	0	0
41	Mark Watts	England	1987	1988	2	10	7*	10.00	132	1	1/57	154.00	1	0
42	Kevin Foyle ♠	England	1988	1993	3	22	16	7.33	0	0	–	–	2	0
43	Robert Savage	England	1988	1993	2	58	32	29.00	0	0	–	–	2	0
44	**John Dixon**	England	1988	1988	1	12	12	12.00	72	1	1/59	59.00	1	0
45	**Paul Bail**	England	1989	1990	2	70	66	35.00	0	0	–	–	0	0
46	**Stephen Williams**	England	1989	1990	2	11	11	5.50	0	0	–	–	0	0
47	David Pike	England	1989	1989	1	3	3	3.00	72	2	2/40	20.00	0	0
48	**Mark Davis**	England	1989	1989	1	1	1	1.00	66	1	1/53	53.00	0	0
49	Jeremy Thompson	England	1989	1990	2	41	34	20.50	114	0	–	–	0	0
50	William Johnson †	England	1989	1989	1	14	14*	–	0	0	–	–	0	0
51	Andrew Mildenhall	England	1989	1990	2	5	3	2.50	90	1	1/32	77.00	0	0
52	Matthew Holland	England	1989	1990	2	0	0*	0.00	102	0	–	–	0	0
53	Neil Shardlow †	England	1990	2005	6	28	12	7.00	0	0	–	–	5	1
54	**Lawrence Smith**	England	1993	1993	1	73	73	73.00	0	0	–	–	0	0
55	Paul Marsh	England	1993	2001	2	3	2	1.50	90	1	1/35	63.00	0	0
56	**Keith Tomlins**	England	1993	1993	1	28	28	28.00	72	2	2/51	25.50	0	0
57	Stephen Perrin ♠†	England	1993	2001	5	65	34	13.00	0	0	–	–	2	3
58	**Phil North**	Wales	1993	1993	1	0	0	0.00	72	1	1/44	44.00	0	0
59	Neil Prigent	England	1993	1993	1	14	14*	–	72	2	2/38	19.00	0	0
60	Grant Sheppard	England	1993	1993	1	2	2*	–	24	0	–	–	0	0
61	**Stuart Barnes**	England	1993	1993	1	0	0	–	72	0	–	–	0	0
62	Dwain Winter	England	1999	2001	5	73	37*	18.25	0	0	–	–	0	0
63	Jamie Glasson ♠	England	1999	2004	5	54	23	10.80	0	0	–	–	1	0
64	Robert Wade	England	1999	2002	4	70	28	17.50	78	1	1/53	77.00	2	0
65	James Taylor	England	1999	2002	5	117	49	29.25	12	1	1/19	19.00	3	0
66	Roger Sillence	England	1999	2000	4	89	82	29.66	96	4	3/47	18.75	0	0
67	Russell Rowe ♠	England	1999	2005	8	181	47	25.85	0	0	–	–	2	0
68	Richard Bates	England	1999	2005	9	101	24	12.62	416	11	3/16	34.36	6	0
69	Paul Clifford	England	1999	1999	2	49	34*	49.00	120	4	3/46	21.25	0	0
70	Andrew Collins	England	1999	1999	2	44	24*	44.00	120	4	3/30	17.25	2	0
71	**Billy Taylor**	England	1999	1999	1	0	0	–	60	0	–	–	0	0
72	Paul Draper	England	1999	2001	2	12	10	6.00	60	0	–	–	1	0
73	Malcolm Swift	England	1999	1999	1	17	17	17.00	60	0	–	–	0	0
74	**Roger Fouhy**	New Zealand	1999	1999	1	1	1*	–	60	1	1/34	34.00	0	0
75	Brett Crosdale	England	2000	2000	2	13	13	6.50	0	0	–	–	0	0
76	Kevin Nash	England	2000	2005	6	29	17	9.66	317	8	4/46	28.00	0	0
77	**Jason Searle**	England	2000	2001	3	8	7	4.00	119	4	3/40	22.25	1	0
78	Craig Gibbens	England	2000	2001	4	4	3*	4.00	240	4	2/27	26.75	0	0
79	Richard Bedbrook	England	2001	2005	4	53	24*	53.00	216	5	2/49	32.80	3	0
80	Paul Bates	England	2001	2001	2	18	18	9.00	0	0	–	–	0	0
81	**James Tomlinson**	England	2001	2001	1	0	0	0.00	42	1	1/29	29.00	0	0
82	Jeremy Goode	England	2001	2001	1	29	29	29.00	0	0	–	–	0	0
83	Mark Coxon	England	2001	2002	2	29	17	14.50	0	0	–	–	0	0
84	Christopher Budd	England	2002	2005	3	41	27	13.66	0	0	–	–	2	0
85	**Baqar Rizvi**	Pakistan	2002	2005	3	86	47	28.66	42	0	–	–	0	0
86	James Hibberd	England	2002	2005	3	27	26	9.00	150	7	4/48	11.42	1	0
87	Danny Chard	England	2002	2002	1	7	7*	–	60	2	2/36	18.00	0	0
88	**Jimmy Adams**	Jamaica	2004	2004	1	43	43	43.00	0	0	–	–	1	0
89	Michael Coles	England	2004	2005	2	44	32	22.00	102	3	2/34	17.66	0	0
90	**Chris Rogers**	Australia	2005	2005	1	3	3	3.00	0	0	–	–	0	0
91	James Golding	England	2005	2005	1	10	10	10.00	60	2	2/46	23.00	0	0

== List A captains ==
No.	Name	First	Last	Mat	Won	Lost	Tied	Win%
1	David Richards	1964	1965	2	0	2	0	0%
2	Ian Lomax	1969	1969	1	0	1	0	0%
3	Brian White	1972	1990	3	0	3	0	0%
4	Richard Gulliver	1983	1983	1	0	1	0	0%
5	Philip Thorn	1984	1984	1	0	1	0	0%
6	Richard Cooper	1987	1989	3	0	3	0	0%
7	Kevin Foyle	1993	1993	1	0	1	0	0%
8	Stephen Perrin	1999	2001	4	1	3	0	33.33%
9	Jamie Glasson	2000	2000	1	1	0	0	100.00%
10	Russell Rowe	2001	2005	4	0	4	0	0.00%
**Total**		1964	2005	**21**	**2**	**19**	**0**	**2.1%**
