= Martin Scott =

Martin Scott may refer to:

- Martin Scott (politician), representative of District 2 to the Georgia House of Representatives
- Martin Scott (cricketer) (born 1943), English cricketer
- Martin Scott (English footballer) (born 1968), played for Rotherham United, Bristol City and Sunderland, former manager of Hartlepool United F.C.
- Martin Scott (Scottish footballer) (born 1986), played for Hibernian, Ross County and Livingston
- Martin Scott (military officer), signatory of the Treaty of St. Peters
- Martin Scott (writer), pseudonym of Martin Millar, author of the Thraxas fantasy series
- Martin Scott (FDNY Commissioner) (1898–1979), Fire Commissioner of the City of New York
- Martin J. Scott (1865–1954), American priest
- Martin Scott (rugby union) (born 1966), Scottish rugby union player
