= Paul Marsh =

Paul Marsh may refer to:

- Paul Marsh (English cricketer)
- Paul Marsh (South African cricketer)
- Paul Marsh (literary agent)
- Paul Marsh (politician)
