= David Simpkins =

David Simpkins may refer to:

- David Simpkins (cricketer, born 1934), former English cricketer
- David Simpkins (cricketer, born 1962), former English cricketer
