= Gibbens =

Gibbens is a surname. Notable people with the surname include:

- Barney Gibbens (1935–2012), British businessman
- Byrd Gibbens (1936–2023), American historian and professor
- Craig Gibbens (born 1965), English cricketer
- Jack Gibbens (born 1998), American football player
- Kevin Gibbens (born 1979), English footballer
- Nigel Gibbens (born 1958), British veterinarian and civil servant
- Wayne Gibbens (born 1937), American politician
