= Glasson =

Glasson may refer to:

== Places ==
- Glasson, Bowness, in Cumbria, England
- Glasson, Maryport, in Cumbria, England
- Glasson Dock, in Lancashire, England
- Glassan, in County Westmeath, Ireland (also the Village of the Roses)

== Other uses ==
- Glasson (surname)
