= Giasson =

Giasson is a surname. Notable people with the surname include:

- Benoît Giasson (born 1964), Canadian fencer
- Daniel Giasson (born 1987), Brazilian-born Italian futsal player
- Henry Giasson, American politician
- Jean-Louis Giasson (1939–2014), Canadian Roman Catholic bishop

== See also ==
- Glasson (surname)
