= Glasson (surname) =

Glasson is a surname. Notable people with the surname include:

- Bill Glasson (golfer), American golfer
- Bill Glasson (surgeon), Australian surgeon and politician
- Charlotte Glasson, British musician, composer and bandleader
- Clark Glasson (1913–1994), American golf course designer and constructor
- Ernest Désiré Glasson (1839–1907), French academic and jurist
- Gregory S. Glasson, American musician
- Jamie Glasson, English cricketer
- Paul Glasson, Australian business person active in China
- Steve Glasson, Australian lawn bowls player
- Stephanie Glasson, model and actress, Playboy playmate
