= Peter Russell =

Peter Russell may refer to:

- Patricia Russell (1910–2004), known as Peter, the third wife of Bertrand Russell
- Peter Edward Lionel Russell (1913–2006) British historian
- Peter H. Russell (1932–2024), Canadian political scientist and writer
- Peter Nicol Russell (1816–1905), Australian philanthropist and university benefactor
- Peter Russell (cricketer) (born 1939), English cricketer
- Peter Russell (politician) (1733–1808), Canadian gambler, government official, politician, and judge
- Peter Russell (poet) (1921–2003), British poet, translator, and critic
- Peter Russell (footballer) (born 1935), English footballer active in the 1950s
- Peter Russell (fashion designer) (1886–1966), IncSoc founder member and designer active in Britain from 1931–53
- Peter Russell (ice hockey) (born 1974), British ice hockey player and coach
- Peter Russell (rugby union) (born 1962), Irish rugby union player
- Peter Russell (philosopher) (born 1946), English philosopher

== See also ==
- Russell Peters (born 1970), Canadian comedian
- Russ Peterson (disambiguation)
