= Shardlow (surname) =

Shardlow is a surname. Notable people with the surname include:

- Bertie Shardlow, English cricketer
- Neil Shardlow (born 1970), English cricketer
- Paul Shardlow (1943–1968), English footballer
- Wilfred Shardlow (1902–1956), English cricketer
