= George Barasch =

American trade unionist (1910–2013)

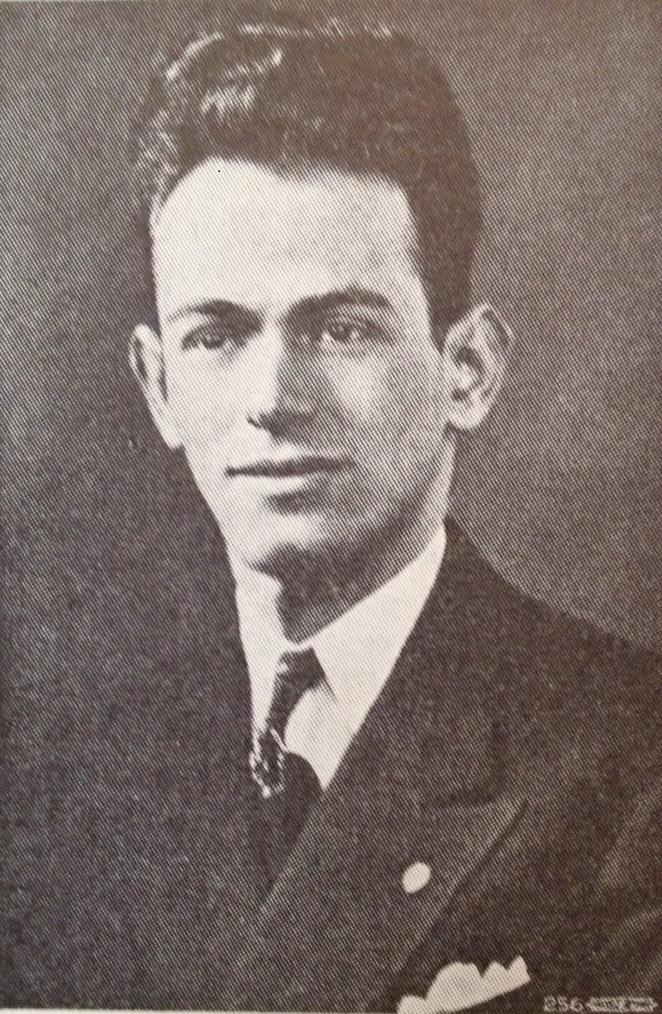
- George Barasch in 1937 after obtaining his first union charter.
- Born: December 10, 1910; Russian Empire
- Died: August 11, 2013 (aged 102); New Jersey, United States
- Occupation: Union Labor Leader
- Known for: Labor leadership, health and wellness advocacy, scholarships, constitutional rights protection, founder of the Union Mutual Benefit Retiree Association, Union Mutual Foundation, and Allied Educational Foundation
- Board member of: Allied Educational Foundation (former chairman)
- Awards: See Honors and Awards
- Website: www.allieded.org

George Barasch (December 10, 1910 – August 11, 2013) was an American trade union labor leader who led both the Allied Trades Council and Teamsters Local 815 (New York City), representing a combined total of 11,000 members.

He was the first labor leader to create a union anti-crime department, and he was instrumental in eliminating racketeering and organized crime from much of local union life in New Jersey and New York City in the early 1950s. His disputes with the United States government in the mid-1960s over control of union benefit funds ultimately led to proposed legislation that prompted and evolved into the Employee Retirement Income Security Act of 1974.

In 1964, after spending over two decades fighting for the rights of workers to organize and thrive, Barasch created the Allied Educational Foundation (AEF) as an independent organization that would continue to advance the education and rights of working Americans outside the labor arena. The semi-annual AEF conferences served as a forum for high-ranking political figures, academics, legal scholars, and civil rights activists including United States Senator William Proxmire, Martin Luther King Jr., Associate Justice of the Supreme Court of the United States William O. Douglas, U.S. President Gerald Ford, U.S. Vice President Walter Mondale, labor columnist Victor Riesel, Pulitzer Prize-winning journalist Harrison Salisbury, and economist Leo Cherne.

Barasch remained Chairman of the Allied Educational Foundation for 49 years until his death, at 102.

== Early life ==
Barasch was born in 1910 in Russia. He immigrated with his family to the US as a young boy and obtained his first job at 14 with Ye Colonial Sweet Shop (Brooklyn) in 1925. In 1928, while employed as a clerk at Davis drug store (Brooklyn), he enrolled at St. John's University. In 1931, Barasch worked as a clerk at B. & W. Pharmacy and soon after became an apprentice at Walgreens drug store. He graduated from St. John's University with a Bachelor of Arts degree in Social Science in 1934, and enrolled in St. John's University School of Law in September 1935.

During his employment with Walgreens "putting in unbearable long hours, sometimes as much as 15 hours a day," Barasch conceived of the idea of forming a labor union.

By 1937, he had left law school, resigned from Walgreens, and secured a charter from the Retail Clerks International Protective Association to devote his efforts to the Drug Store Employee's Union of Greater New York by organizing drug store employees.

== Union Activities ==
Beginning with his first union in 1937, Local 1185 of the Retail Clerks International Association, Barasch began organizing smaller union groups, including Local 105 of the International Leather Goods Workers Union, Local 22806 (Powder Puff & Cosmetics Workers Union), Local 20646 (Cosmetics, Soap & Perfumery Workers Union), Local 20734 (Vinegar & Mustard Workers Union), and Local 18943 (Hardware & Grocery Workers Union). In 1942, he created and served as managing editor of the Unity News, an official labor newspaper publication of the Manufacturers, Wholesale, and Retail Unions to inform and connect union workers during and after World War II. The newspaper received a citation award from the United States Treasury Department from Henry Morgenthau Jr. on May 27, 1943, for "distinguished services rendered in behalf of the War Savings Program." On January 1, 1947, Barasch created the Allied Trades Council to incorporate the unions he had organized in the past decade, and soon after, he sought and was granted affiliation with the International Leather Goods, Plastic & Novelty Workers Union, which allowed Allied Trades Council to be designated as an AFL (American Federation of Labor) organization. The AFL designation was maintained until the two groups parted ways in 1965. Under his leadership, the union expanded to the distributing and manufacturing, leather, drug and novelty fields which included over 10,000 members by 1948. Barasch was later issued a charter for a second union in 1952 (Local 815 of the International Brotherhood of Teamsters) to aid in his expansion efforts in New York when he began having jurisdictional disputes with Teamsters locals. By 1965, Allied Trades Council represented 88 businesses, including pharmacies, restaurants, and candy stores and Local 815 grew to represent 165 pharmacies, perfumeries, bakeries, and other businesses.

Barasch oversaw and successfully negotiated through several strikes, including a notable strike at Coty's, Inc. perfumers in 1950 of 500 employees seeking a $5 per week raise. He also led a unified effort through his Allied Trades Council to expose and eliminate racketeering from union life. As organized crime infiltrated the unions, he submitted a memorandum to New York's Governor Thomas Dewey laying out a four-point legislative plan to eliminate infiltration of the unions by organized crime, suggesting laws which would:

1. "Hand down prison terms for any employer found bribing a union official and any labor man taking a 'bundle.'
2. Require all union leaders to submit to the state notarized affidavits swearing they have no criminal records and also a sworn statement that they and their unions are not dealing with racketeers; with stiff prison raps for perjury.
3. Bar all unions failing to submit such affidavits from protection of the labor laws or use of the state and federal labor boards.
4. Enjoin from picketing all unions failing to submit such data."

Barasch was the first labor leader to create an anti-crime department within a union, employing a criminologist who consulted with them on their rounds of unionized plants to identify and weed out racketeering. The committee reviewed national reports on racketeering activity, maintained a list of criminal union offenders, and educated members on crime detection. "If the thugs don't back down, Barasch gets into the streets himself with as many union members as are needed, and they fight it out," labor columnist Victor Riesel wrote. "It takes courage, but from this you get a clean union." In the union's newsletter, distributed throughout New York, Barasch noted he was ready to "take 1,000 members off the job and meet them in the streets and wipe them out." Barasch's efforts were credited with the cessation of the criminal "invasion," keeping out violent offenders accused of kidnapping, robbery, and other criminal acts.

Organized crime was just one of many subversive elements impacting unions. Communism and unethical employee behavior also played significant roles. When a pro-Soviet United Electrical Workers group, led by Jim Lustig, attempted to gain access to secret intelligence and suppress production on a missile being produced by an S.W. Farber plant set for Korea (to match the Soviet Chinese rocket "mangling" U.S. troops), Barasch worked with the employees to eliminate this communist element from the union. Pro-soviet union leaders, clearly threatened, were reported as telling workers at the plant "If we catch any of you sons of bitches playing around with that AFL union, you'll be sorry for it." Barasch also helped organize and participated in the Crusade for Freedom as one of a few select individuals who released 17 balloons at a 1951 ceremony on Bedloes Island to win trade union support for the freedom project in Europe, promoting freedom for countries under Communist power. The following evening, Brigadier General David Sarnoff, chairman of the Greater New York Crusade for Freedom, spoke at a convention of the Allied Trades Council and encouraged New York unions to make the Crusade for Freedom "the greatest labor movement our nation has ever known." Barasch responded in kind, noting "the decision to place the Crusade on the convention's agenda is a reflection of the deep-felt concern of our membership over the current global struggle for men's minds."

In 1952, a prescription drug ring was discovered in New York where thousands of patients were manipulated to purchase unapproved, high-priced pharmaceuticals. These medications were placed in pharmacies by unethical pharmacists and doctors who partnered to exploit unassuming customers for financial gain. Patients would pay up to 80% more for these unapproved, and presumably poor quality medications. These drug firms were bankrolled by thousands of doctors and pharmacists who purchased shares in the companies. A stern and effective warning was sent out by Barasch, on behalf of Allied Trades Council, to its over 11,000 members, many of whom were employed in hundreds of drug stores in New York's five boroughs, that "any member of our union found aiding and abetting and joining this criminal hoax on unsuspecting customers will be brought up on charges immediately . . . Wherever and whenever you find evidence that would indicate that this racket is being carried on in your store or plant, call the union immediately . . . Give us all the details and we will turn them over to the proper authorities."

Barasch's innovative public relations effort to increase union membership included a media campaign on radio and television "in an effort to arouse the housewives by telling them bluntly how labor racketeering corrodes their breadwinners and flattens their pocketbooks." One effective campaign included soliciting new union members through Tyrone Power's "Freedom U.S.A." radio program, a weekly show about the activities of a Senator in Washington. The show, which ran approximately 30 minutes, began and ended with commercials inviting written requests to "learn how you can win job insurance, health insurance, life insurance and a host of other insurances of a better life--that's Local 815, A. F. L. Teamster's union" or "Would you like a life insurance policy--ranging from two to ten thousand dollars--free of charge? Of course, you would. But for the most part, it you are a working man or woman, you either can't afford a policy at all or you have a small one which is a burden on your shrinking pocket book. Members of Local 815 of the A. F. L. Teamsters' Union have insurance policies that don't cost them one penny."

On December 6, 1957, the national Teamsters Union was ousted from the A.F.L.-C.I.O., primarily due to the corrupt influence of James ("Jimmy") R. Hoffa who currently served as Vice President of the Teamsters. Hoffa was under criminal investigation by the United States Senate Select Committee on Improper Activities in Labor and Management for many charges, including affiliation with organized crime, corruption, and wiretapping charges. Despite these charges, Hoffa was elected president of the national Teamsters union on January 23, 1958. Barasch made headlines when he dropped out of the race for vice president of Teamsters Joint Council 16 in January, remarking that there was no place in the election for "uncommitted middle-of-the-road independents," forcing the election to go to anti-Hoffa candidate John Hoh. This would effectively limit Hoffa's control over the New York council, which included 57 locals (125,000 members) including Barasch's union Local 815. Hoh was officially elected vice president of the New York Teamsters Joint Council on February 11, 1958. Barasch stayed on with the Teamsters Union, serving as secretary-treasurer of the Drug, Chemical, Cosmetic, Plastics and Affiliated Industries, Warehouse Employees, Local 815 of the International Brotherhood of Teamsters and president of the Allied Trades Council. He remained in these roles until 1964, when he formed and served as chairman of the Allied Educational Foundation.

== Senate hearings ==
In the early 1960s, US Attorney Robert Morgenthau began a series of investigations into possible abuses of pension funds by New York unions. Non-governmental pension funds had exceeded $60 billion by 1962 ($639 billion in 2025), covering approximately 17 million workers. Pension plans could be administered jointly by unions and employing corporations, corporations alone, or unions alone.

"The tremendous amounts of money involved make closer policing necessary," noted Morgenthau. Adding fuel to the investigations were recent amendments to the Welfare and Pension Plans Disclosure Act, making "theft, embezzlement, kickbacks or bribery in connection with benefit plans a Federal Crime."

In addition, the New York State Department of Labor was now required to submit any reports of possible criminal activity discovered in fund annual reports to the United States Department of Labor. The investigations led to the sentencing of Max Davis, secretary-treasurer of the Independent Brotherhood of Production, Maintenance & Operating Employes [sic], Local 10 in New York, on September 13, 1963, for embezzling $16,500 from a union welfare fund on which he was trustee. It was the first conviction since the amendments were passed classifying misappropriation of the funds as a federal crime.

Other federal grand jury indictments for misappropriation of funds in this time period included Ralph Gordon, former business agent in New York City for the American Guild of Variety Artists, and James Hoffa, Teamsters Union president.

In July 1963, Barasch found himself pulled into the investigations, when he obtained an order temporarily stopping execution of a federal subpoena requesting records on two Teamster Union welfare funds associated with overseas research foundations. The two welfare funds under investigation included the Allied Welfare Fund and the Union Mutual Fund, for which Barasch served as Trustee.

The foundations named included the Chemical Research Foundation and Cromwell Research Foundation, both not-for-profit corporations set up in Liberia and Puerto Rico, respectively, for which he currently served as president. Barasch argued that the subpoena "constitutes an unreasonable search and seizure," violates constitutional rights, and would prevent the foundations "from performing their charitable functions."

Furthermore, he noted that "under the law the records of pension and welfare funds need not be disclosed without a reasonable cause to believe that the law has been violated," which had not been shown.

Barasch's welfare funds and research foundations were reexamined two years later on June 29, 1965, when Barasch was called to testify before a Senate subcommittee executive session led by Senator John Little McClellan (D) of Arkansas. McClellan, famous for his investigation of union racketeers in 1957 and also known as "the Senate's first angry man," commented that he was investigating the relatively small unions as an alleged example "of a problem which faces this country nationwide." However, at least one labor columnist mentioned that he "asserted all this in his request for money and authority for his famous committee."

The purpose of the session was to "examine records of welfare funds" exceeding $4 million in assets of two unions led by Barasch, including the Allied Trades Council (New Jersey) and Local 815 of the International Brotherhood of Teamsters in New York (also known as the Drug, Chemical, Cosmetic, Plastics and Affiliated Industries Warehouse Employes [sic]. McClellan indicated that his panel, the Senate Select Committee on Improper Activities in the Labor or Management Field, received reports "indicating serious mishandling of the assets of certain welfare and pension funds in the New York area." Of particularly note, none of the other members of the subcommittee accompanied McClellan to the hearing session.

His objective for the session was to discover if Barasch's research foundations "actually constituted a diversion of welfare and pension funds from their intended purpose and deprived the dues-paying union members of rightful benefits" as well as if the research funds were "honestly administered" without conflicts of interest or negligence. Investments in the welfare funds had been placed in research and educational foundations based on the advice of tax consultants in the 1950s. Barasch stated elsewhere that "a delegation of unionists [went] to London last August" and "he had been making plans for future implementation of the foundations' monies," but invoked the Fifth Amendment throughout his testimony as advised by his attorneys and supplied only the names and addresses of the union officials.

Barasch was called upon again, now before the Permanent Investigations Senate Subcommittee on July 20, 1965, in Washington, D.C., to testify for approximately 2 hours during which he notably refused to answer on the grounds of possible self-incrimination 128 times: "I respectfully decline to answer this question on the grounds that it might tend to incriminate me." In the opening statement, Barasch's attorneys stated they had advised him to refuse to answer questions.

Although that may seem excessive, by United States law, Barasch would need to invoke the Fifth Amendment to every substantive question or he would effectively waive his privilege to invoke it. Additionally, it is a safer approach than mistakenly making a conflicting statement and being charged with perjury.

The following day, Barasch, along with seven other board members of the Allied Trades Council or Local 815, invoked the Fifth Amendment a total of 157 times, further frustrating McClellan, who claimed that the funds were "out of the control of the union members" and that Barasch and two other members of the foundation could "split [the money] three ways" if that was their intention. At one point, McClellan exclaimed "I'm begging you now to get it back," to management trustee Lewis G. Bernstein, referring to the joint welfare fund for the two unions. By the third day, McClellan had resorted to name calling, referring to the union leadership as "rotten criminal management" while Barasch continued to invoke the Fifth Amendment, bringing his total to 171 and the group total to over 300 in the course of the three days of testimonies. After the third and final day of testimony concluded, Fred M. Vinson, Assistant Attorney General in charge of the Criminal Division of the Department of Justice, reported that "the United States Attorney's Office in New York City and the Criminal Division's staff in Washington could find no violation of federal criminal law."

Despite finding no evidence of legal wrongdoing, McClellan continued to smear Barasch's management of his unions in the media. Yet, McClellan could not produce any reports of union members "losing medical or dental care," which he alleged would happen as a result of the reorganization of funds. The Herald Tribune reported that "none of the members of either of his two unions seem to have lodged a protest." One witness, W. Rutherford James, testified that welfare payments were consistently being made to his wholesale drug company Towns and James as expected. Ironically, McClellan's finding that the funds of the foundations "could have been disposed of or distributed at the whim of the principals of these corporations" and "had they decided to divide [the fund] among themselves, they could have done so freely and with apparent legal impunity," in the absence of Barasch or his associates ever doing so, provided support for Barasch's good intentions, consistent with his early union activities.

Furthermore, subcommittee investigator Robert E. Dunne testified that neither the officers, directors, or trustees of any of the organizations or unions under investigation took any of the money for personal use and none of the funds left the United States territory, with the exception of a smaller account temporarily in a Swiss bank account that was returned earlier in the year.

Soon after the hearings concluded, multiple news commentaries were published highlighting the need for reform of laws governing union welfare and pension funds. In August 1965, Senator Jacob K. Javits (R) of New York introduced a bill to prevent transfer of welfare and pension funds outside the United States, in addition to other regulations. That legislation later evolved into pieces of the Employee Retirement Income Security Act of 1974. The Javits bill was followed by legislation introduced by McClellan on October 12, 1965.

On June 1, 1966, New York Governor Nelson Rockefeller announced that Barasch had voluntarily moved the funds in question back under the control of the New York State Insurance Department after nine months of negotiations.

== Advocacy ==
Selected photographs from conferences of the Allied Educational Foundation

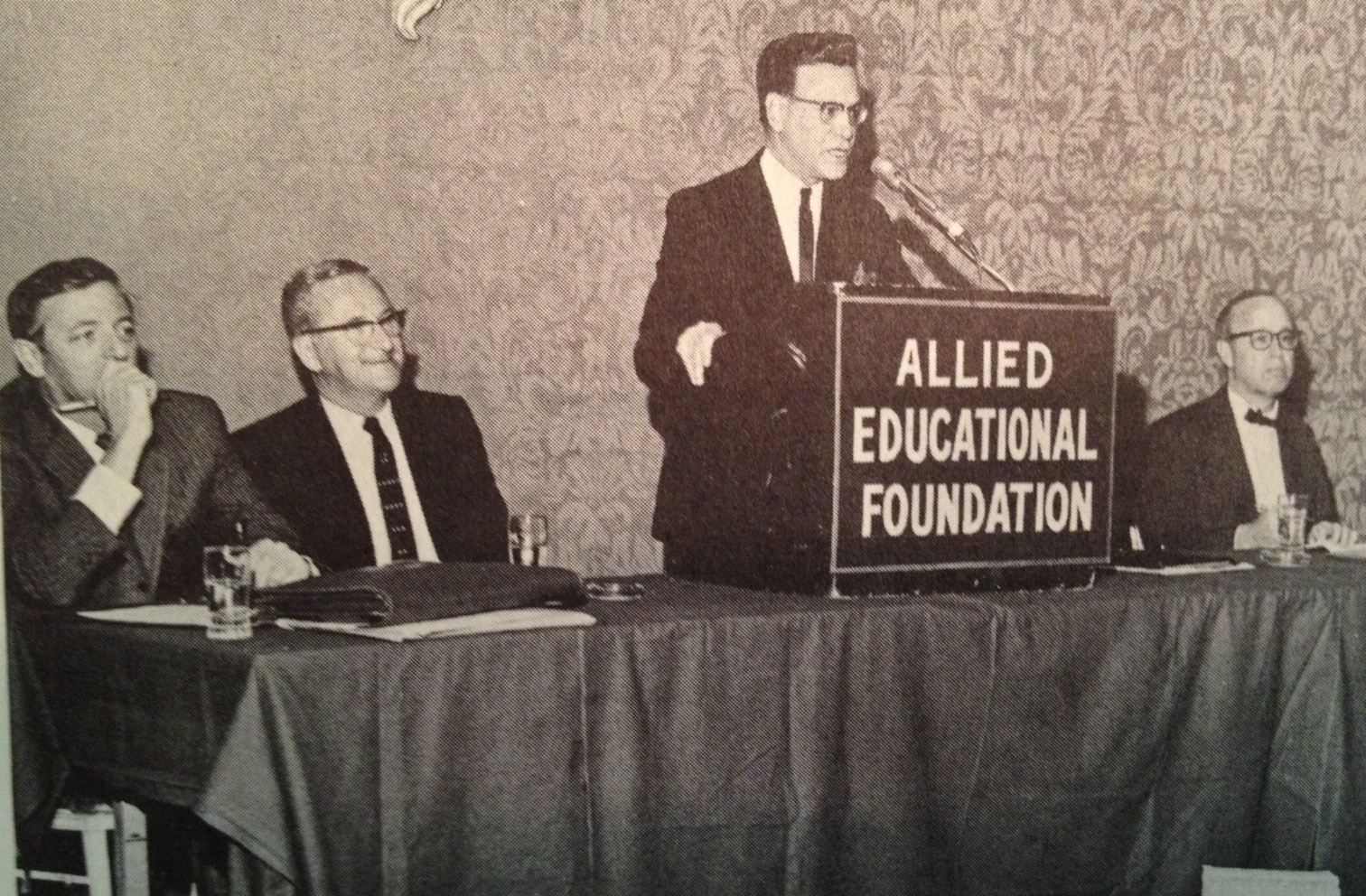
William Buckley Jr., Abe Weiss, George Barasch, Arthur Schlesinger (l. to r.) in 1968

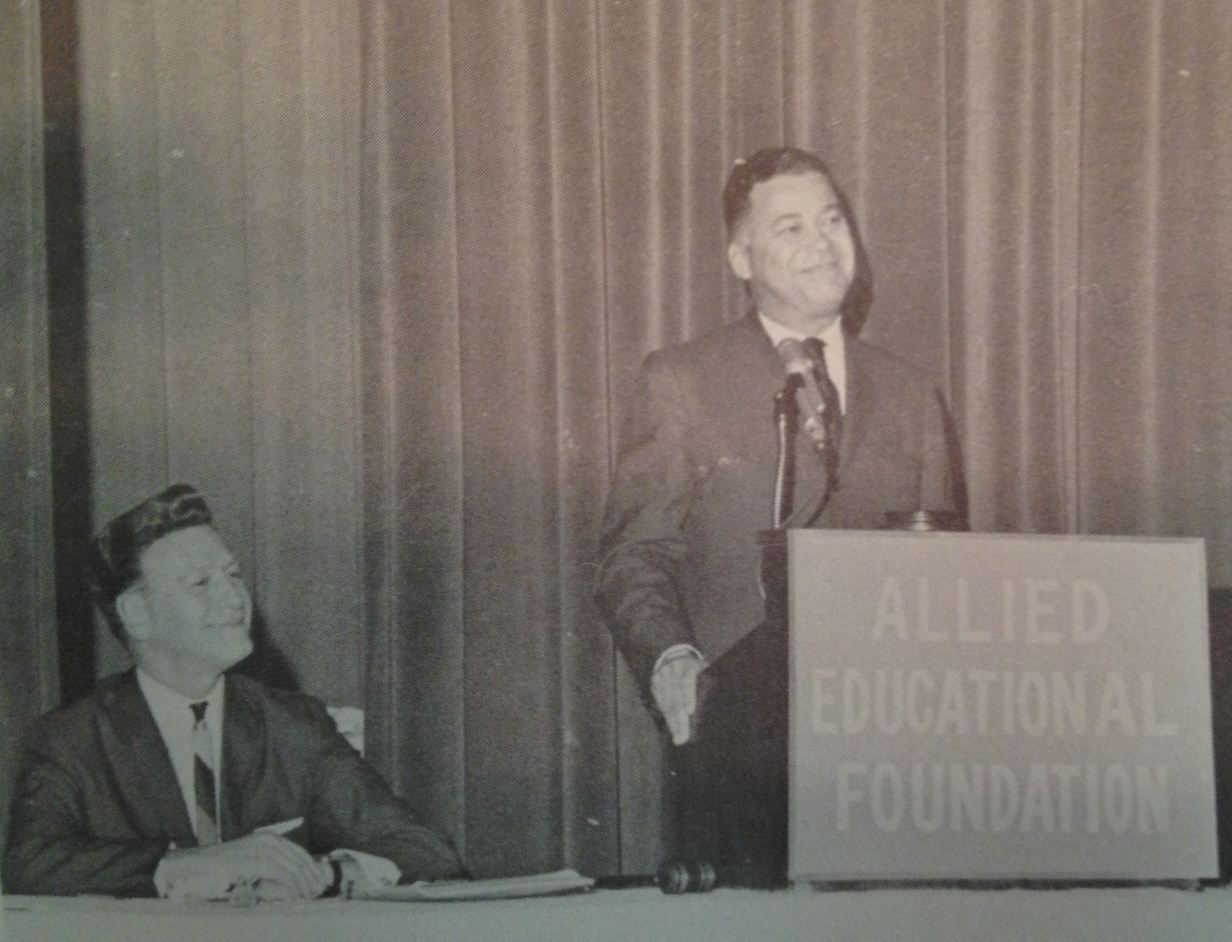
Barasch (left) with Senator Edward W. Brooke in 1967

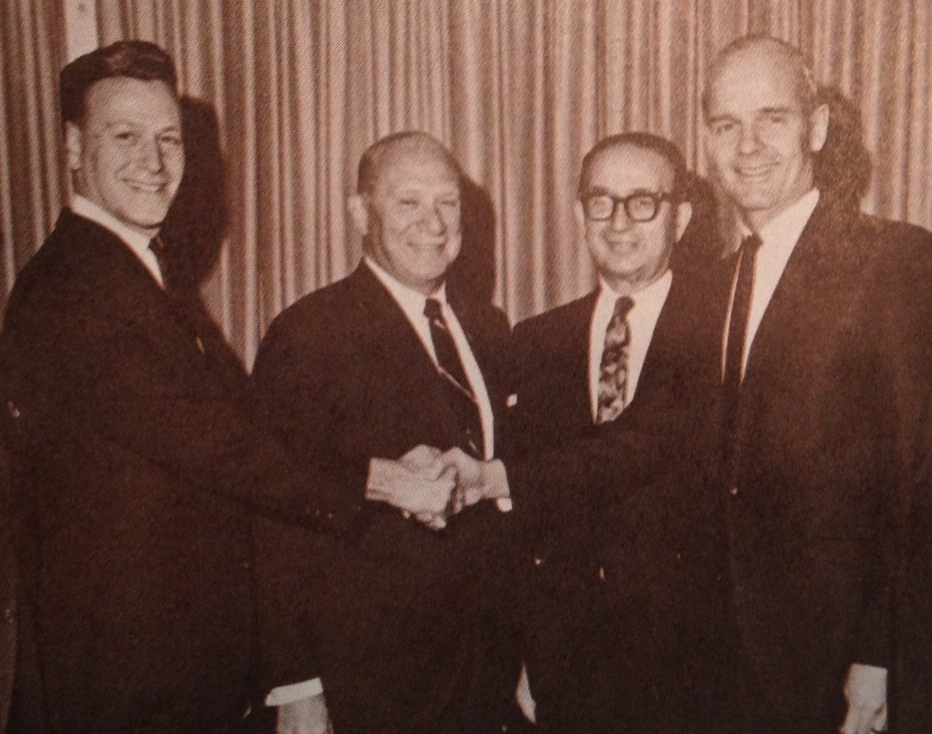
George Barasch, Congressman Herbert Tenzer, State Senator Simon Leibowitz, and Senator William Proxmire (l. to r.) in 1966

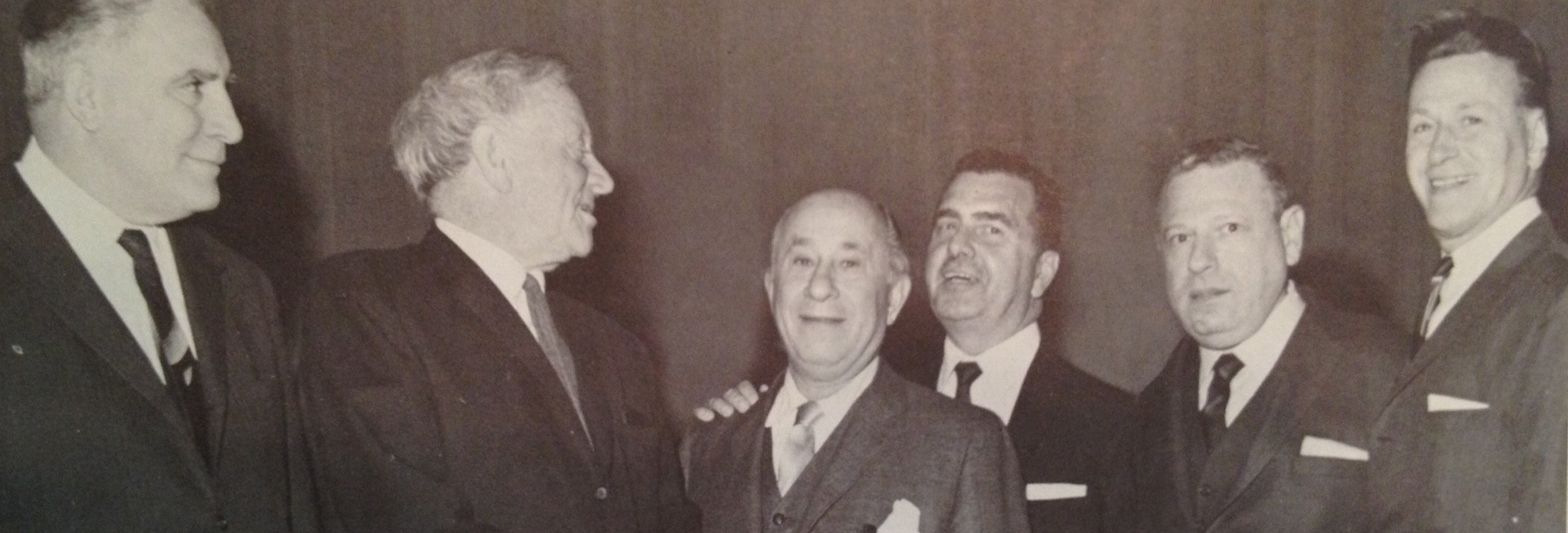
Federal Judge John Cannella, U.S. Supreme Court Justice William O. Douglas, NY Supreme Court Justice Louis B. Heller, NY Supreme Court Justice Frank J. Pino, Justice Lewis A. Kaplan, and George Barasch (l. to r.) in 1967

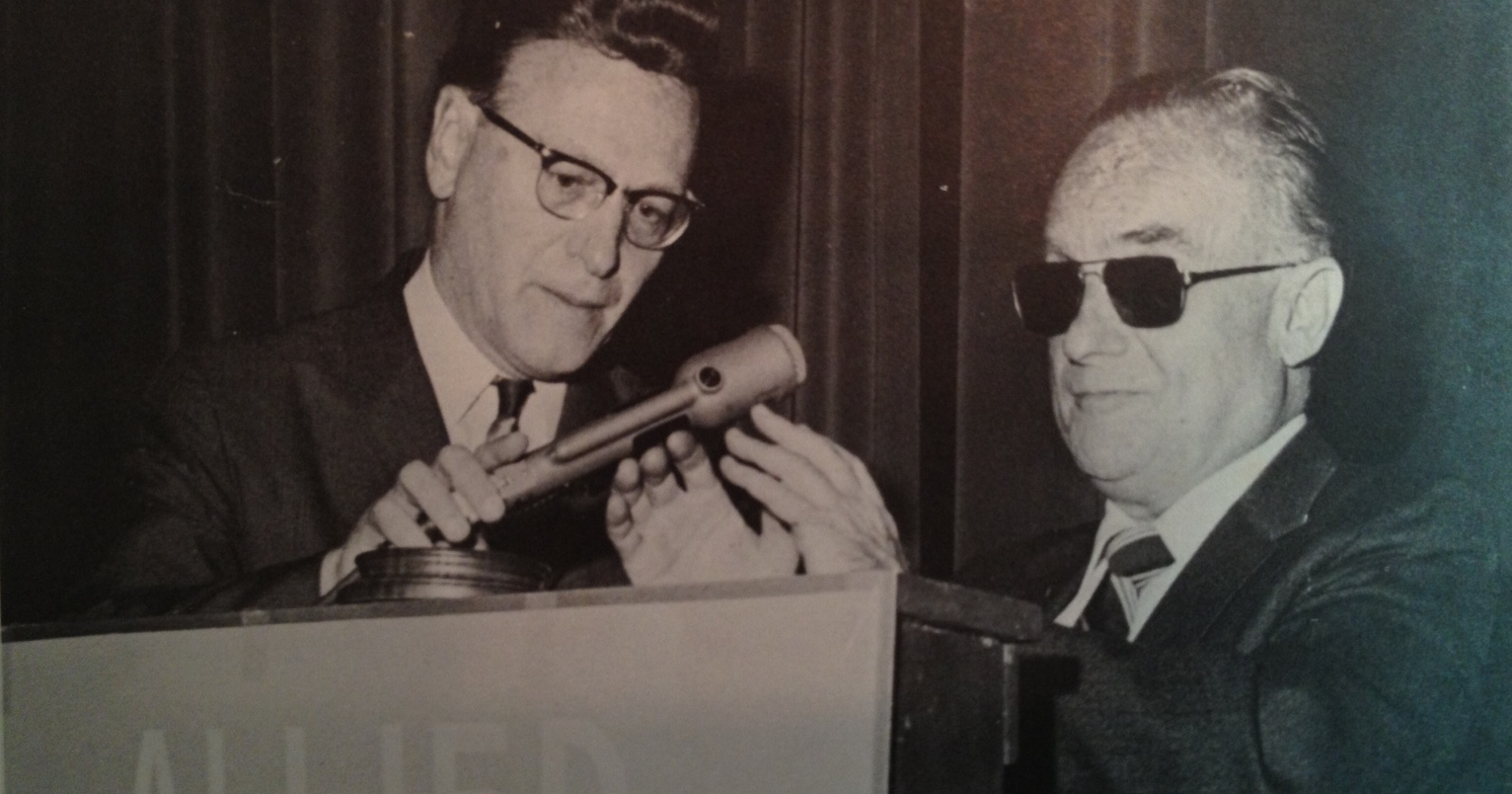
George Barasch with Victor Riesel in 1967

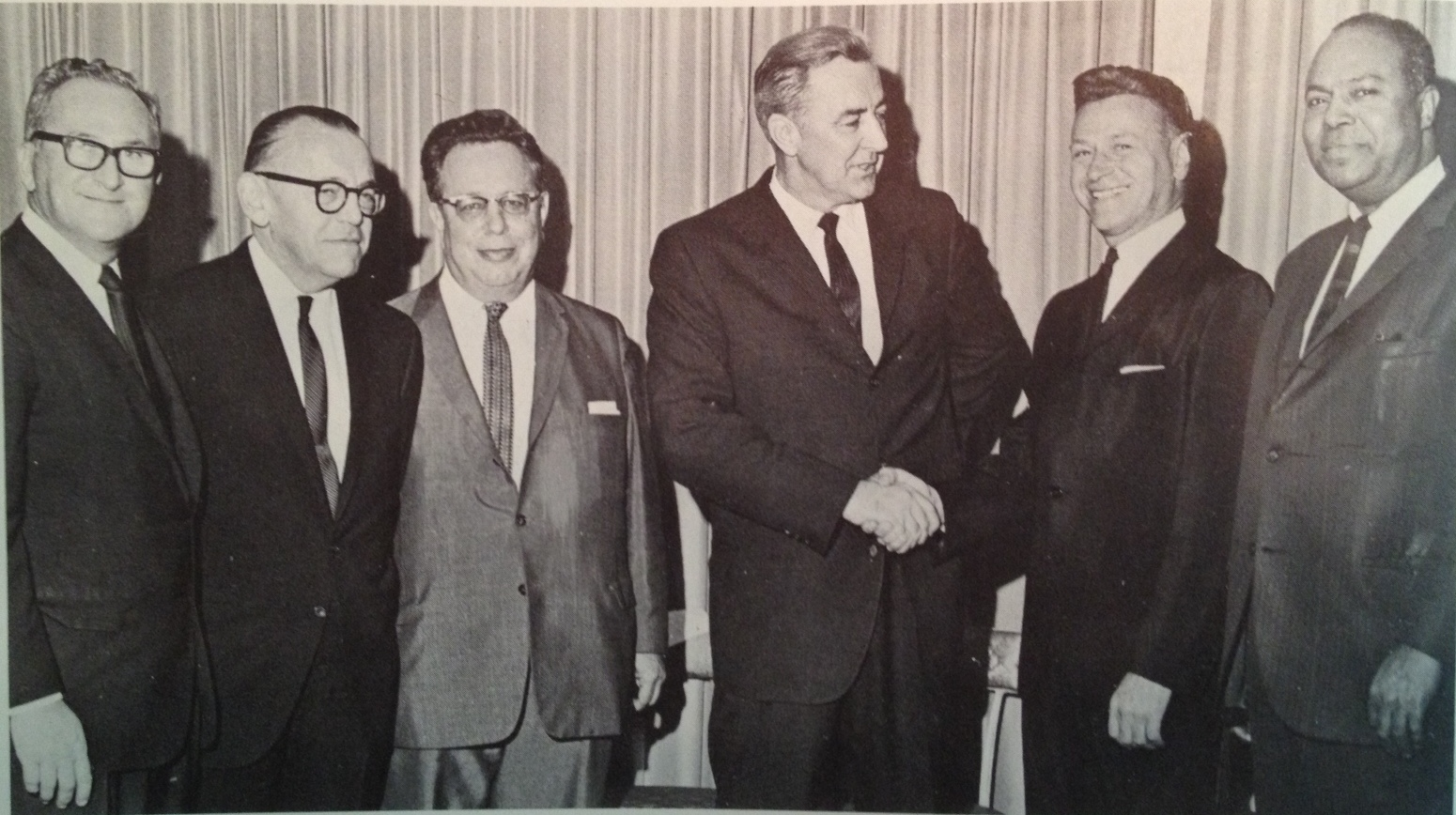
Abe Weiss, Ben Naumoff, Leon Keyserling, Senator Eugene McCarthy, George Barasch, and James Farmer (l. to r.) in 1966

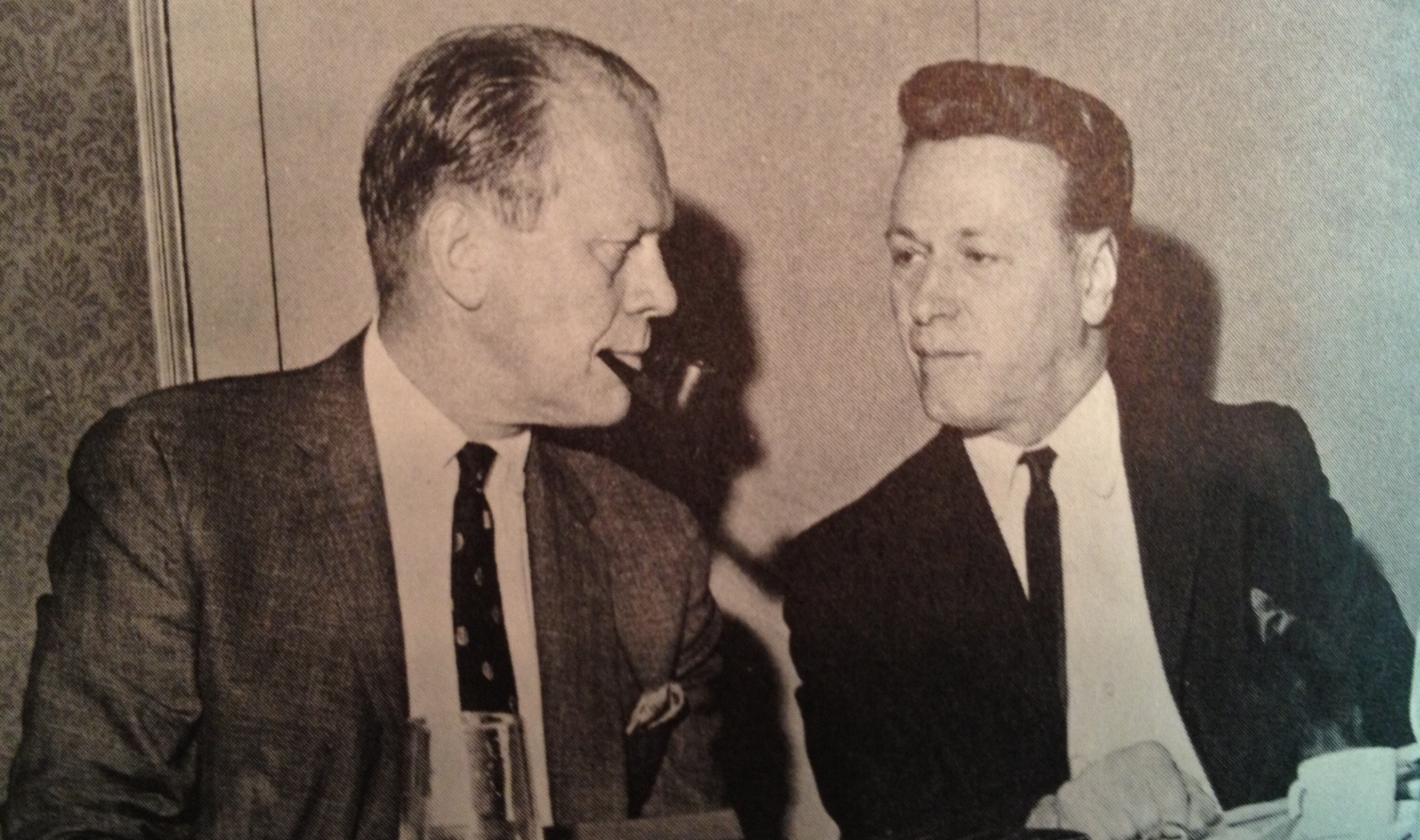
George Barasch with President (then Congressman) Gerald Ford, 1968

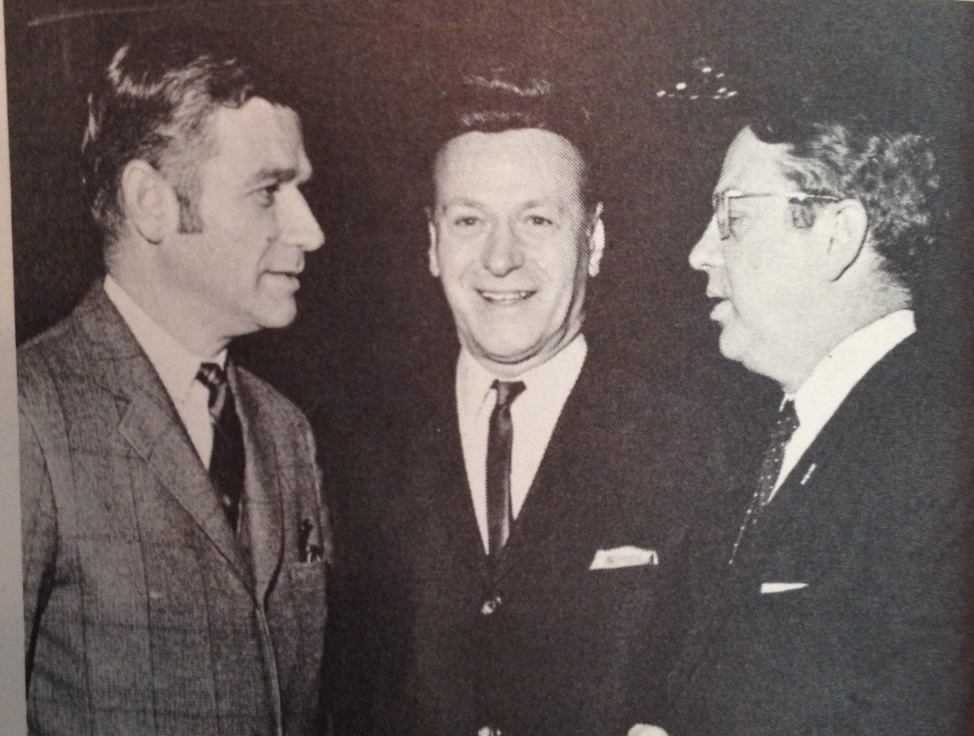
Barasch (center) with Senate colleagues Mark Hatfield (left) Vance Hartke in 1968

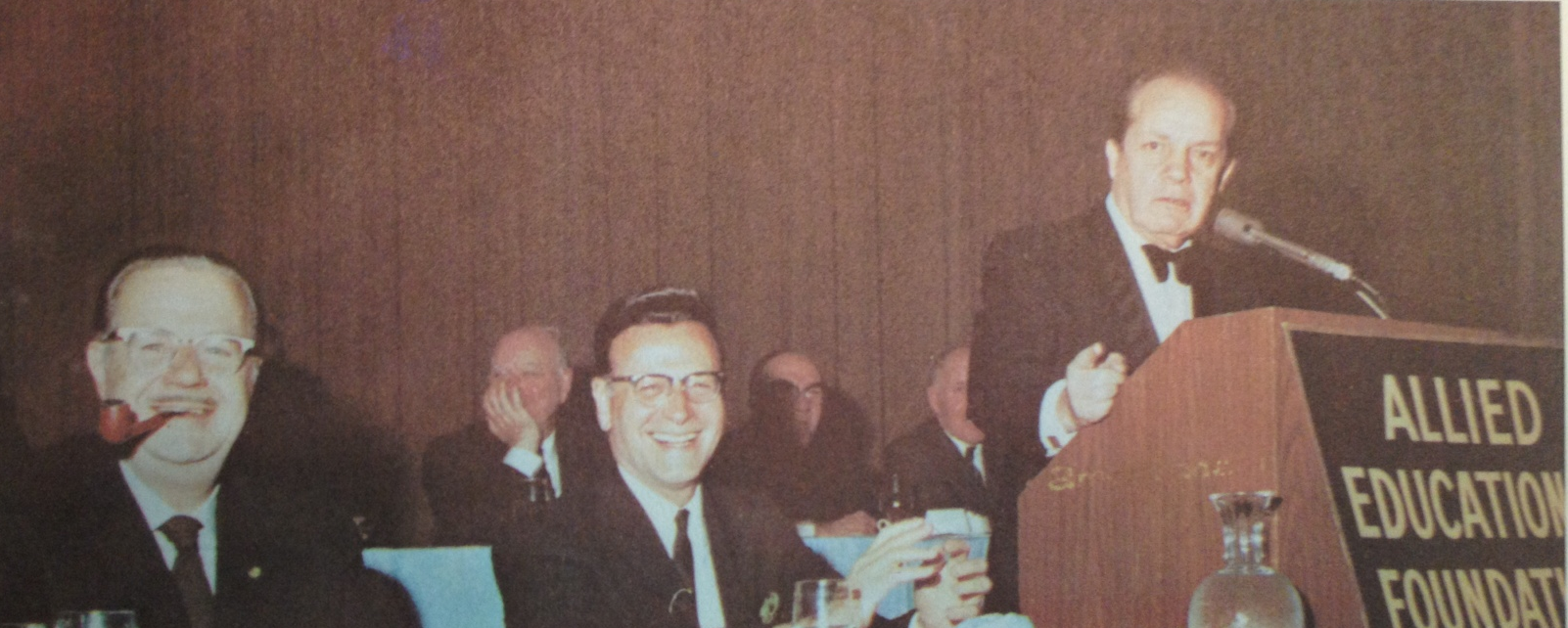
Barasch (center) with Senator Hugh Scott (left) and Joey Adams (right) in 1969

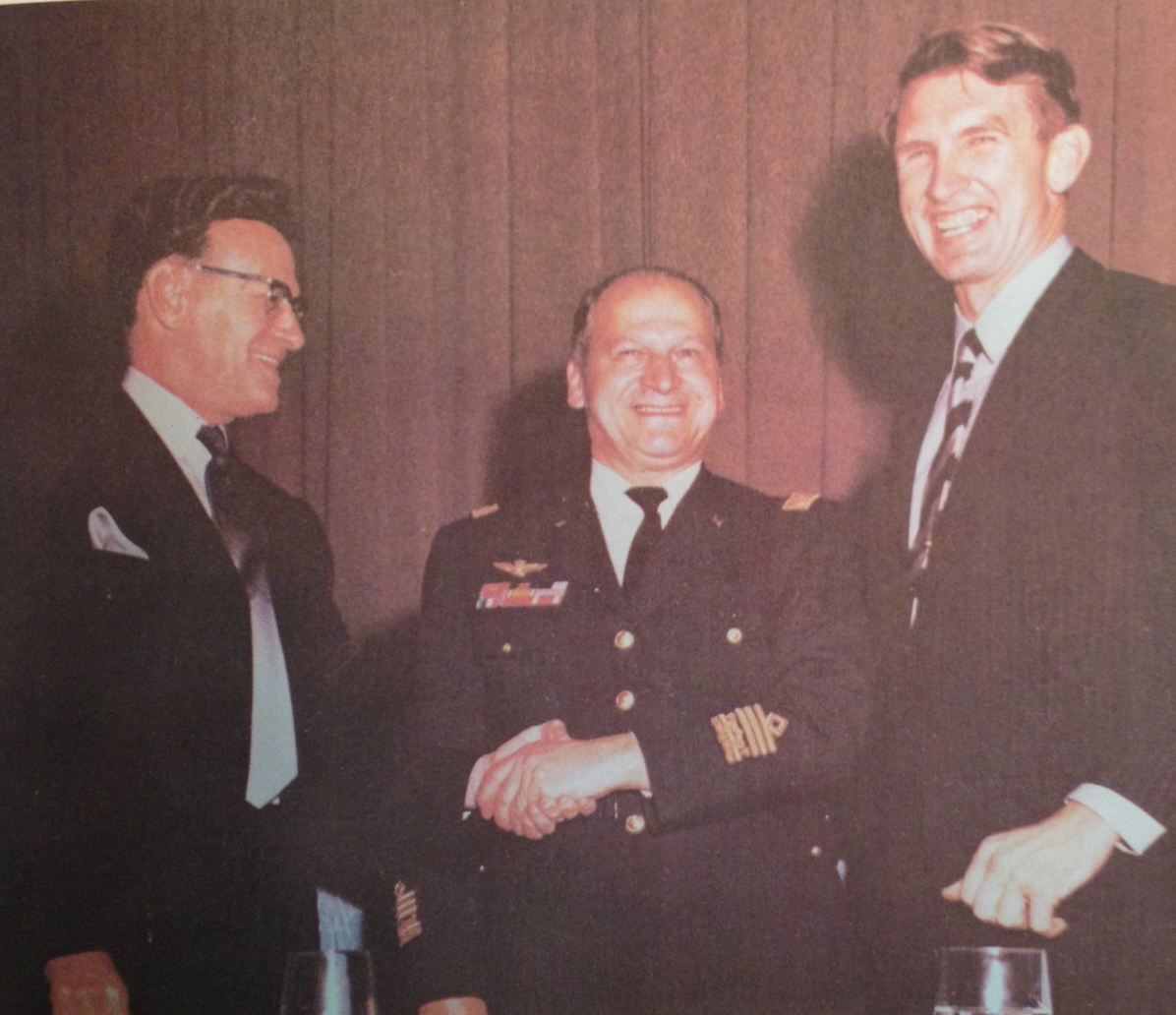
Barasch with General August DiFlorio and Senator Joseph D. Tydings (l. to r.) in 1969

After spending over two decades fighting for the rights of workers to organize and thrive, Barasch saw the need for an independent organization that would continue to advance the education and rights of working Americans outside the labor arena. In particular, Barasch believed that for United States citizens to adapt and live successfully in the context of change they must be educated on their rights and civic responsibilities as Americans, have the ability to critically evaluate and obtain accurate information from the media, and take ownership of their health and live longer, more active lives. In 1964, Barasch created the Allied Educational Foundation as an educational and charitable organization based on his beliefs focused on a mission of improving the lives of working men and women through education and legal advocacy. He also helped organize the Union Mutual Benefit Association to promote and protect the interest of retirees and organized many health and welfare conferences.

By 1966, his semi-annual educational conferences had attracted civil rights advocates, leading politicians, legal scholars, academics, economists and prominent journalists. Notable conferences with speaker lists are shown below.

Shop Stewards' Educational Conference - November 10, 1966 (Americana Hotel, NYC)

Speakers: James Farmer (civil rights advocate), Leon Keyserling (economist), Senator Eugene McCarthy, Benjamin Naumoff (regional director of the Bureau of Labor-Management Reports), and Victor Riesel (nationally syndicated labor columnist).

Union Mutual Benefit Association Conference - December 14, 1966 (Americana Hotel, NYC)

Speakers: Leo Cherne (economist, Executive Director of the Research Institute of America), Senator William Proxmire, and Reverend Ralph David Abernathy (civil rights leader). Notable attendees: Congressman Herbert Tenzer and State Senator Simon Leibowitz.

Allied Educational Foundation Conference - May 2, 1967 (Americana Hotel, NYC)

Speakers: Max Lerner (syndicated columnist for The New York Post), Martin Luther King Jr., Senator Gale W. McGee, Harrison E. Salisbury (Pulitzer Prize-winning journalist), Stanley Levey (labor columnist), and James A. Wechsler (journalist). Notable attendees: State Senator Simon Leibowitz, Stanley Steingut (politician), and Congressman Frank Brascoe.

Allied Educational Foundation Conference - November 21, 1967 (Americana Hotel, NYC)

Speakers: Senator Edward Brooke, Victor Riesel (nationally syndicated labor columnist), Senator John. O. Pastore, and U.S. Supreme Court Justice William O. Douglas. Notable attendees: Federal Judge John Cannella, New York Supreme Court Justice Louis Heller, New York Supreme Court Justice Frank Pino, United States District Judge Lewis A. Kaplan, and Joseph Treretola (Vice-President of the International Brotherhood of Teamsters).

Allied Educational Foundation Conference - May 2, 1968 (Americana Hotel, NYC)

Speakers: President Gerald Ford, Drew Pearson (Washington, D.C., journalist), William F. Buckley (author and commentator), Vice President Walter F. Mondale, and Arthur M. Schlesinger Jr. (author and historian). Notable attendees: New York Supreme Court Justice Isidore Dollinger, State Senator Simon Leibowitz, Queens County District Attorney Thomas Mackell, and FDNY Commissioner and Judge Edward Thompson.

Allied Educational Foundation Conference - November 26, 1968 (Americana Hotel, NYC)

Speakers: Murray Baron (trade union leader), Senator Mark Hatfield, New York State Assembly Minority Leader Stanley Steingut, and Senator Vance Hartke. Notable attendees: Queens County District Attorney Thomas Mackell and State Senator Simon Leibowitz.

Allied Educational Foundation Conference - May 8, 1969 (Americana Hotel, NYC)

Speakers: Congressman Adam Clayton Powell Jr., Carl Albert (Speaker of the U.S. House of Representatives), Senator Hugh Scott, and Joey Adams (President of the American Guild of Variety Artists). Other notable attendees: Benjamin Naumoff (regional director of the Bureau of Labor-Management Reports), Judge Morton Tolleris, Murray Baron (political analyst), Vincent Tabano (President of the New York City Police Honor Legion), FDNY Commissioner and Judge Edward Thompson, Judge Louis Kaplan, Judge Harry Frank, and Carl J. Mattei (Director of the Bureau of Industrial Safety, New York State Department of Labor) .

Allied Educational Foundation Conference - November 18, 1969 (Americana Hotel, NYC)

Speakers: Louis Levine (Labor Commissioner of New York State), Jack Anderson (investigative journalist), Senator Daniel Inouye, and Senator Joseph Tydings. Notable attendees: Queens County District Attorney Thomas Mackell, General August DiFlorio, Brooklyn District Attorney Eugene Gold, Judge John Starkey, Judge Guy Mangnano, and New York State Supreme Court Justice Simon Leibowitz.

Barasch continued to be active in activities benefiting working and retired union workers for the remainder of his life, and held several positions to benefit community and health organizations, including serving as President of the New York Cardiac Center (NYCC) from 1970 to 2000, editor of the NYCC publication Cardiac Journal, Labor Consultant to the Queens County District Attorney Thomas J. Mackell and Director of the Queens County Crime Prevention Board, Member of the Honor Legion of the New York Police Department, and Research Professor of Management at Stevens Institute of Technology. He continued as Chairman of the Board of Trustees of the Allied Educational Foundation until the time of his death, at 102 years.

== Honors and awards ==
Barasch was presented with achievements and honors from the following organizations:

- Citation awarded to Unity News (1943), Henry Morgenthau Jr., United States Treasury Department
- Man With a Heart Award (1975), New York Cardiological Society
- Columbia University College of Physicians and Surgeons (1979)
- Accuracy in Media
- Washington Legal Foundation
- Tribute (1996), Stevens Institute of Technology
- Certificate of Appreciation (1981), Korean Association of New York
- Distinguished Friends Award (1989), The Samuel Bronfman Department of Medicine, Mount Sinai Medical Center
- Retired Detectives Association, New York Police Department (1992)
- Tribute (1966), Union Mutual Benefit Association

== Publications and contributions ==
In 1951, Barasch's tribute to the New York Times on its centennial was published along with the tributes of other notable contributors including G. Keith Funston (president of the New York Stock Exchange), Gabriel Gonzalez Videla (President of Chile), and Otilio Ulate (President of Costa Rica).

The tribute read as follows: "In a period when all too few media of information and communication are disposed to accord labor dignified recognition, your attitude is refreshing. To me it is significant that every trade union official I know reads The Times regularly and thoroughly. This is, at once, a tribute to The Times itself and to its capable staff of labor reporters."

== Bibliography ==
Barasch, G. (April, 1945) Industry Loses Leadership. Unity News. Official Publication of Retail and Wholesale Unions, American Federation of Labor.

Barasch, G. (July 1945) Shades of the Past. Unity News. Official Publication of Retail and Wholesale Unions, American Federation of Labor.

Barasch, G. (March, 1946) Oil, Graft—And Big Business. Unity News. Official Publication of Manufacturing, Wholesale and Retail Unions, American Federation of Labor.

Barasch, G. & Allied Trades Council (no date). Shop Stewards Guide. Brooklyn, NY: The Caslon Press, Inc.

Barasch, G. (1987). Four Enemies of Health: Water, Salt, Sugar & Fat. Englewood Cliffs, NJ: Allied Educational Foundation in association with the New York Cardiac Center, Inc.

Barasch, G. (1987). Heart and Coronary Disease: Symptoms, Diagnosis and Prevention. Englewood Cliffs, NJ: Allied Educational Foundation in association with the New York Cardiac Center, Inc.

Barasch, G. (1987). Tests: What They Tell About You. Englewood Cliffs, NJ: Allied Educational Foundation in association with the New York Cardiac Center, Inc.

Barasch, G. (1987). Three Elixirs of Life: Living Longer and Better. Englewood Cliffs, NJ: Allied Educational Foundation in association with the New York Cardiac Center, Inc.

Barasch, G. (1989). Sleeping Disorders, Depression and Suicide. Englewood Cliffs, NJ: Allied Educational Foundation in association with the New York Cardiac Center, Inc.

Barasch, G., Thompson, E., Abrams, F., & Baron, Murray. (Winter, 1980). Is a Free Press a Threat to Freedom? Allied Educational Foundation Conference Proceedings. Communications and the Law, 2, p. 67-92.

Barasch, G., Thompson, E., Goodale, J., & Fahringer, H. P. (Winter, 1981). Television in the Courtroom -- Limited Benefits, Vital Risks? Allied Educational Foundation Conference Proceedings. Communications and the Law, 3, p. 35-50.

Barasch, G., Thompson, E., McGeady, P. J., & Glasser, I. (Spring, 1982). Morality, Pornography and the Law. Allied Educational Foundation Conference Proceedings. Communications and the Law, 4, p. 43-68.
