= David Essenhigh =

English cricketer (born 1936)

Personal information
- Full name: David Ewart Essenhigh
- Born: 31 July 1936 (age 90); Folkestone, Kent, England
- Batting: Right-handed
- Bowling: Right-arm medium

Domestic team information
- Years: Team
- 1958–1971: Wiltshire

Career statistics
Competition	LA
Matches	2
Runs scored	20
Batting average	10.00
100s/50s	–/–
Top score	19
Balls bowled	1
Wickets	–
Bowling average	–
5 wickets in innings	–
10 wickets in match	–
Best bowling	–
Catches/stumpings	–/–
- Source: Cricinfo, 10 October 2010

David Ewart Essenhigh (born 31 July 1936) is a former English cricketer. Essenhigh was a right-handed batsman who bowled right-arm medium pace. He was born at Folkestone, Kent.

Essenhigh made his Minor Counties Championship debut for Wiltshire in 1958 against the Somerset Second XI. From 1958 to 1971, he represented the county in 48 Minor Counties Championship matches, the last of which came against Berkshire.

Essenhigh also represented Wiltshire in 2 List A matches against Nottinghamshire in the 1965 Gillette Cup and Essex in the 1969 Gillette Cup. In his 2 List A matches, he scored 20 runs at a batting average of 10.00 and a high score of 19.
