= John T. O'Hagan =

American fire commissioner (1925–1991)

John T. O'Hagan (April 7, 1925 – January 2, 1991) was appointed the 22nd Fire Commissioner of the City of New York by Mayor John V. Lindsay on October 11, 1973, and served in that position throughout the Administration of Mayor Abraham D. Beame until he was replaced by incoming Mayor Edward I. Koch on January 17, 1978.

== Biography ==
O'Hagan joined the New York City Fire Department in 1947 at the age of 22, and quickly rose up the ranks. Appointed Chief of Department on December 16, 1964, at the age of 39, he was the youngest Fire Chief in FDNY history.

Chief O'Hagan led the department through some of its most years, those dominated by the arson that plagued the city in the 1960s and 1970s, a time when the city's bankruptcy forced the layoff of hundreds of firefighters. He earned a reputation as a fire officer and a tough manager, despite his initial lack of knowledge of how to work the levers of city government. He was unable to thwart a 1968 revision of the building code, drafted in large part by the real estate industry, that he thought thinned the margin of fire safety.

Still, Chief O'Hagan returned in 1973 with safety measures added to the code. But they did not apply to the World Trade Center, which, being owned by another government agency, the Port Authority of New York and New Jersey, was exempt from city codes and fire inspections.

On October 11, 1973, at the age of 48, he was appointed Fire Commissioner by Mayor Lindsay. He retained his position as Chief of Department while serving as Fire Commissioner. O'Hagan was the recipient of the inaugural Sloan Public Service Award in 1973.

He was the author of High Rise/Fire & Life Safety in 1977 and was an international authority on fire administration and fire safety. He officially retired from the FDNY on July 18, 1978, after 31 years of service.

He died on January 2, 1991, in Brooklyn, New York, of cardiopulmonary arrest from cancer.

== Family ==
O'Hagan was married to Kaye Tully, had three children (Catherine, Susan and Michael) and ten grandchildren (Clare, Molly, Cecilia, Emily, Elizabeth, John, Daniel, Maggie, Joseph, and Michael).

== Publications ==
- O'Hagan, John T. (Edited by John F. Shreve under the direction of Donald M. O'Brien), Fire Fighting During Civil Disorders. New York: International Association of Fire Chiefs, 1968. 84 pages. (LCCN 74154094)
- O'Hagan, John T., and Edward H. Blum. Technology Aids Fire Service. New York: Rand Institute, 1972. 31 pages. (LCCN 73170898)
- O'Hagan, John T. High Rise/Fire and Life Safety. New York: Dun-Donnelley Pub. Corp., 1977. 274 pages. (ISBN 0-878149260)

Fire appointments
Preceded by Robert O. Lowery	FDNY Commissioner; 1973–1978	Succeeded by Augustus A. Beekman
