= Paul Draper (cricketer) =

English cricketer (born 1972)

Personal information
- Full name: Paul Robert Draper
- Born: 19 May 1972 (age 54); Southampton, Hampshire, England
- Batting: Right-handed
- Bowling: Slow left-arm orthodox

Domestic team information
- Years: Team
- 1997–2003: Wiltshire

Career statistics
Competition	LA
Matches	2
Runs scored	12
Batting average	6.00
100s/50s	–/–
Top score	10
Balls bowled	60
Wickets	–
Bowling average	–
5 wickets in innings	–
10 wickets in match	–
Best bowling	–
Catches/stumpings	1/–
- Source: Cricinfo, 10 October 2010

Paul Robert Draper (born 19 May 1972) is an English cricketer. He is a right-handed batsman who bowls slow left-arm orthodox. He was born at Southampton, Hampshire.

Draper made his Minor Counties Championship debut for Wiltshire in 1997 against Berkshire. From 1997 to 2001, he represented the county in 10 Minor Counties Championship matches, the last of which came against Cornwall. Draper also represented Wiltshire in the MCCA Knockout Trophy. His debut in that competition came against Norfolk in 1997. From 1997 to 2003, he represented the county in 12 Trophy matches, the last of which came against Buckinghamshire.

Draper also represented Wiltshire in 2 List-A matches. His debut List-A match came against Herefordshire in the 1999 NatWest Trophy. His second and final List-A match came against Ireland in the 1st round 2002 Cheltenham & Gloucester Trophy which was played in 2001. In his 2 List-A matches, he scored 12 runs at a batting average of 6.00, with a high score of 10.

Draper currently plays club cricket for South Wiltshire Cricket Club in the Southern Premier Cricket League.
