= Malcolm Swift =

English cricketer (born 1974)

Personal information
- Full name: Malcolm Swift
- Born: 21 April 1974 (age 52); Southport, Lancashire, England
- Nickname: Swifty
- Height: 6 ft 0 in (1.83 m)
- Batting: Right-handed
- Bowling: Right-arm medium

Domestic team information
- Years: Team
- 1998–1999: Wiltshire

Career statistics
Competition	LA
Matches	1
Runs scored	17
Batting average	17.00
100s/50s	–/–
Top score	17
Balls bowled	60
Wickets	–
Bowling average	–
5 wickets in innings	–
10 wickets in match	–
Best bowling	–
Catches/stumpings	–/–
- Source: Cricinfo, 11 October 2010

Malcolm (Mal) Swift (born 21 April 1974) is a former English cricketer. Swift was a right-handed batsman who bowled right-arm medium pace. He was born in Southport, Lancashire.

Swift impressed for Warminster Cricket Club and subsequently made his Minor Counties Championship debut for Wiltshire County Cricket Club in 1998 against Wales Minor Counties Cricket Club. He represented the county in one further Championship match against Berkshire County Cricket Club, which also came in 1998. Swift also represented Wiltshire in the MCCA Knockout Trophy. His debut in that competition came against Herefordshire County Cricket Club in 1998. From 1998 to 1999, he represented the county in 3 further Trophy matches, the last of which came against the Warwickshire Cricket Board.

Swift also represented Wiltshire in a single List A cricket match against Herefordshire County Cricket Club in the 1999 NatWest Trophy. In his only List A match he scored 17 runs.

Swift retired at the end of the 2025 season after representing Ainsdale Cricket Club in Southport for over two decades. He finished with over 11,000 runs & 1,100 wickets.
