= Robert O. Lowery =

American fire department commissioner (1916 – 2001)

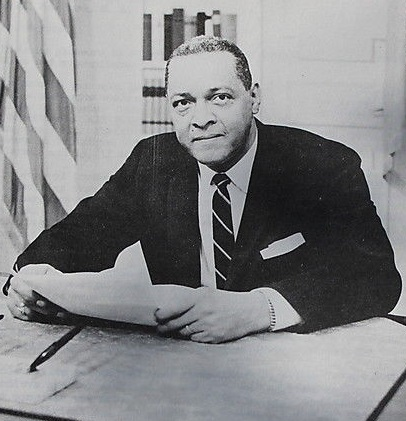
- Robert O. Lowery in 1966

21st New York City Fire Commissioner
- In office January 1, 1966 – September 29, 1973
- Mayor: John V. Lindsay
- Preceded by: Martin Scott
- Succeeded by: John T. O'Hagan

Personal details
- Born: April 20, 1916 Buffalo, New York
- Died: July 24, 2001 (aged 85) New York, New York
- Spouse: Viviane Lowery
- Children: Trudy and Leslie Lowery

Robert Oliver Lowery (April 20, 1916 – July 24, 2001) was sworn in as the 21st New York City Fire Commissioner by Mayor John V. Lindsay on January 1, 1966, and held that position until his resignation on September 29, 1973.

== Biography ==
Lowery left a job in Harlem as head usher for the Alhambra Theatre for his first civil service appointment. After taking a number of tests, he became a subway conductor for a year in the New York Transit Authority. His next post was with the New York City Fire Department (FDNY). He was appointed as a fireman in 1941 and promoted to fire marshal in 1946, the same year that he won a commendation for arresting a man for 30 acts of arson and burglary. In 1960, he was cited for capturing an armed arsonist, and the year after became an acting lieutenant in the Bureau of Fire Investigation. During this time, Lowery was an active member of the Vulcan Society and its president from 1946 to 1950, 1953 and 1954, 1957, and from 1959 to 1963.

On November 14, 1963, Lowery was appointed Deputy Fire Commissioner. He addressed the racial issue head on, striving to increase the proportion of blacks and the sensitivity of whites. He also increased the number of black firefighters assigned to black neighborhoods, as well as the number of blacks in leadership roles.

On November 23, 1965, incoming mayor Lindsay announced the appointment of Lowery as Fire Commissioner of the New York City Fire Department. His was the first commissioner level appointment announced by the mayor-elect. Lowery, who was the first African American to be a fire commissioner of a major U.S. city, held that position for more than 7 years until his resignation on September 29, 1973, in order to campaign for then-controller, Abraham D. Beame, the Democratic candidate for mayor.

Lowery died on July 24, 2001, in Manhattan at the age of 85.

Either as tribute or by happenstance, his name is shown prominently in a scene of the first movie The Godfather, printed in bold red letters on a hospital fire safety box in the scene where Michael Corleone protects his father, Vito Corleone, against would-be assassins in the absence of his bodyguards. The action is set before 1946, however, so the reference is anachronistic.

Fire appointments
Preceded by Martin Scott	FDNY Commissioner; 1966–1973	Succeeded by John T. O'Hagan
