= Russell Wilson (cricketer) =

English cricketer (born 1959)

Russell Wilson (born 17 March 1959, in Blackpool) is a former English cricketer. He was a right-handed batsman and right-arm medium-fast bowler who played for Wiltshire.

Having made his Minor Counties Championship debut for the team in 1979, he made his only List A appearance during the 1983 NatWest Trophy, against Northamptonshire. From the tailend, he scored 9 not out.
