= Kevin Foyle =

English cricketer

Kevin Foyle (born 19 June 1962, in Hammersmith) is an English schoolmaster who was a county cricketer. He was a right-handed batsman and leg-break bowler who played for Wiltshire.

Foyle, who played in the Second XI Championship for Leicestershire and then Derbyshire between 1983 and 1986, played in the Minor Counties Championship for Wiltshire between 1988 and 1994. Foyle made his debut List A appearance for the team against Essex in 1988, and made two further appearances in the competition, in 1990 and 1993.

In the three innings he batted, he scored 22 runs, including a top score of 16 runs.

He was later headmaster of Northaw School.
