= Michael Martin (cricketer) =

English cricketer

Personal information
- Full name: Michael Haddon Martin
- Born: 11 May 1928; Startley, Wiltshire, England
- Died: 27 April 2011 (aged 82); Bury St Edmunds, Suffolk, England
- Batting: Left-handed
- Bowling: Right-arm fast

Domestic team information
- Years: Team
- 1949–1964: Wiltshire

Career statistics
Competition	LA
Matches	2
Runs scored	1
Batting average	0.50
100s/50s	– /–
Top score	1
Balls bowled	88
Wickets	2
Bowling average	31.50
5 wickets in innings	–
10 wickets in match	–
Best bowling	2/46
Catches/stumpings	1/ –
- Source: Cricinfo, 10 October 2010

Michael Haddon Martin (11 May 1928 – 27 April 2011) was an English cricketer. Martin was a left-handed batsman who bowled right-arm fast. He was born at Startley, Wiltshire.

Martin made his Minor Counties Championship debut for Wiltshire in 1949 against the Gloucestershire Second XI. From 1949 to 1964, he represented the county in 62 Minor Counties Championship matches, the last of which came against the Lancashire Second XI.

Martin also represented Wiltshire in 2 List-A matches. His debut List-A match came against Hampshire in the 1964 Gillette Cup. His second and final List-A match came against Nottinghamshire in the 1965 Gillette Cup. In his 2 List-A matches, he took 2 wickets at a bowling average of 31.50, with best figures of 2/46.
