= John Thompson (cricketer, born 1918) =

English cricketer, rackets player and school master (1918–2010)

Personal information
- Full name: John Ross Thompson
- Born: 10 May 1918; Berkhamsted, Hertfordshire, England
- Died: 15 June 2010 (aged 92); Marlborough, Wiltshire, England
- Batting: Right-handed
- Bowling: Right-arm off-spin
- Role: Batsman

Domestic team information
- Years: Team
- 1938 to 1939: Cambridge University
- 1938 to 1954: Warwickshire

Career statistics
Competition	FC
Matches	68
Runs scored	3,455
Batting average	31.12
100s/50s	6/19
Top score	191
Balls bowled	12
Wickets	0
Bowling average	–
5 wickets in innings	0
10 wickets in match	0
Best bowling	–
Catches/stumpings	32/0
- Source: Cricinfo, 25 September 2021
- Sports career
- Sport: squash
Medal record
British Amateur Championships
Silver medal – second place	1947/1948	singles

John Ross Thompson (10 May 1918 – 15 June 2010) was an English amateur cricketer, rackets player and school master.

== Life and career ==
Thompson was born in Berkhamsted, Hertfordshire, and was educated at Yardley Court and Tonbridge School in Kent, and at St John's College, Cambridge. A right-handed batsman, he was regarded as a potential Test player during his two years in the Cambridge University team in 1938 and 1939, Wisden remarking that he batted in "very correct style" with "the makings of a brilliant batsman". However, World War II intervened, and after the war he concentrated on his career as a mathematics and physics teacher at Marlborough College, appearing occasionally for Warwickshire during the school holidays. In 1949, after playing his first match in mid-August, he scored 609 runs in first-class cricket at an average of 60.90, putting him sixth in the national averages.

He played 36 matches of Minor Counties cricket with Wiltshire from 1955 to 1963. He toured Canada in 1951 and North America in 1959 with the Marylebone Cricket Club, tours that coincided with the English school holidays; he also managed the 1959 tour.

Thompson was also a notable rackets player, winning the silver medal behind Norman Borrett at the British Amateur Squash Championships during the 1947/48 season. He also played squash for England. At Marlborough, as well as teaching mathematics and physics, he was master in charge of rackets and cricket, and a housemaster.
