= Mark Watts (cricketer) =

English cricketer (born 1963)

Personal information
- Full name: Michael mark Watts
- Born: 20 August 1963 (age 63); Wroughton, Wiltshire, England
- Batting: Right-handed
- Bowling: Right-arm fast-medium

Domestic team information
- Years: Team
- 1984–1988: Wiltshire

Career statistics
Competition	LA
Matches	2
Runs scored	10
Batting average	10.00
100s/50s	–/–
Top score	7*
Balls bowled	132
Wickets	1
Bowling average	154.00
5 wickets in innings	–
10 wickets in match	–
Best bowling	1/57
Catches/stumpings	1/–
- Source: Cricinfo, 10 October 2010

Mark Andrew Watts (born 20 August 1963) is a former English cricketer. Watts was a right-handed batsman who bowled right-arm fast-medium. He was born at Wroughton, Wiltshire.

Watts made his Minor Counties Championship debut for Wiltshire in 1984 against the Somerset Second XI. From 1984 to 1988, he represented the county in 27 Minor Counties Championship matches, the last of which came against Devon. Watts also represented Wiltshire in the MCCA Knockout Trophy. His debut in that competition came against Devon in 1985. From 1985 to 1988, he represented the county in 6 Trophy matches, the last of which came against Cornwall.

Watts also represented Wiltshire in 2 List-A matches against Yorkshire in the 1987 NatWest Trophy and Essex in the 1988 NatWest Trophy. In his 2 List-A matches, he scored 10 runs at a batting average of 10.00, with a high score of 7*. With the ball he took a single wicket at a cost of 154 runs, with best figures of 1/57.
