= Basil Chivers =

English cricketer

Basil Chivers (born 31 December 1939) was an English cricketer who played for Wiltshire. He was born in Devizes.

Chivers, who began his career in the Minor Counties Championship at the age of 17, made several appearances for Kent's Second XI between 1959 and 1962.

Chivers' sole List A appearance came in the 1964 Gillette Cup, against Hampshire. Chivers scored a duck in the match, and Wiltshire lost the match by a margin of 120 runs.
