= John Livermore (cricketer) =

English cricketer (born 1940)

John Livermore (born 29 October 1940) was an English cricketer who played for Wiltshire. He was born in Greenford, Ealing, Middlesex.

Livermore, who made a single appearance for Leicestershire Second XI in 1963, represented Oxfordshire and later Wiltshire in the Minor Counties Championship. Livermore made a single List A appearance for Wiltshire, during the 1969 season, against Essex. From the tailend, he scored 2 runs, and took bowling figures of 0–56 from 11 overs.
