= Russell Rowe (cricketer) =

English cricketer (born 1975)

Personal information
- Full name: Russell John Rowe
- Born: 14 May 1975 (age 51); Salisbury, Wiltshire, England
- Batting: Right-handed
- Bowling: Right-hand off break

Domestic team information
- Years: Team
- 1994–2005: Wiltshire

Career statistics
Competition	LA
Matches	8
Runs scored	181
Batting average	25.85
100s/50s	–/–
Top score	47
Balls bowled	–
Wickets	–
Bowling average	–
5 wickets in innings	–
10 wickets in match	–
Best bowling	–
Catches/stumpings	2/–
- Source: Cricinfo, 10 October 2010

Russell John Rowe (born 14 May 1975) is a former English cricketer. Rowe was a right-handed batsman who bowled right-arm off break. He was born at Salisbury, Wiltshire.

Rowe made his Minor Counties Championship debut for Wiltshire in 1994 against Cheshire. From 1994 to 2005, he represented the county in 50 Minor Counties Championship matches, the last of which came against Devon. Rowe also represented Wiltshire in the MCCA Knockout Trophy. His debut in that competition came against Herefordshire in 1999. From 1999 to 2005, he represented the county in 21 Trophy matches, the last of which came against Norfolk.

Rowe also represented Wiltshire in List-A cricket. His debut List-A match came against the Northamptonshire Cricket Board in the 1999 NatWest Trophy. From 1999 to 2005, he represented the county in 8 List-A matches, the last of which came against Kent in the 2005 Cheltenham & Gloucester Trophy which was played in 2001. In his 8 List-A matches, he scored 181 runs at a batting average of 25.85, with a high score of 47. In the field he took 2 catches.
