= James Ridge (cricketer) =

English cricketer

Personal information
- Full name: James Alvar Ridge
- Born: 6 February 1943 (age 83); Ashton Keynes, Wiltshire, England
- Batting: Left-handed
- Bowling: Left-arm medium

Domestic team information
- Years: Team
- 1966–1973: Wiltshire

Career statistics
Competition	LA
Matches	3
Runs scored	12
Batting average	4.00
100s/50s	–/–
Top score	10
Balls bowled	66
Wickets	–
Bowling average	–
5 wickets in innings	–
10 wickets in match	–
Best bowling	–
Catches/stumpings	–/–
- Source: Cricinfo, 10 October 2010

James Alvar Ridge (born 6 February 1943) is a former English cricketer. Ridge was a left-handed batsman who bowled left-arm medium pace. He was born at Ashton Keynes, Wiltshire.

Ridge made his Minor Counties Championship debut for Wiltshire in 1966 against Berkshire. From 1966 to 1973, he represented the county in 26 Minor Counties Championship matches, the last of which came against Dorset.

Ridge also represented Wiltshire in List A matches. His debut List A match came against Essex in the 1969 Gillette Cup. His second and third List A matches both came against Hampshire in the 1972 and 1973 Gillette Cup. In his 3 List A matches, he scored 12 runs at a batting average of 4.00, with a high score of 10.
