= Neil Shardlow =

English cricketer

Personal information
- Full name: Tristan Neil Shardlow
- Born: 1 June 1970 (age 56); Bristol, England
- Batting: Left-handed
- Role: Wicketkeeper

Domestic team information
- Years: Team
- 1989–2006: Wiltshire

Career statistics
Competition	LA
Matches	6
Runs scored	28
Batting average	7.00
100s/50s	–/–
Top score	12
Balls bowled	–
Wickets	–
Bowling average	–
5 wickets in innings	–
10 wickets in match	–
Best bowling	–
Catches/stumpings	5/1
- Source: Cricinfo, 12 October 2010

Tristan Neil Shardlow (born 1 June 1970) is a former English cricketer. Shardlow was a left-handed batsman who played primarily as a wicketkeeper. He was born in Bristol.

Shardlow made his Minor Counties Championship debut for Wiltshire in 1989 against Shropshire. From 1989 to 2006, he represented the county in 57 Minor Counties Championship matches, the last of which came against Herefordshire. Shardlow also represented Wiltshire in the MCCA Knockout Trophy. His debut in that competition came against Cornwall in 1990. From 1990 to 2006, he represented the county in 21 Trophy matches, the last of which came against Norfolk. During his Minor Counties career with Wiltshire, the presence of fellow wicketkeeper Stephen Perrin kept him out of the Wiltshire side for large periods.

Shardlow also represented Wiltshire in List A cricket. His List A debut came against Surrey in the 1990 NatWest Trophy. From 1990 to 2005, he represented the county in 6 List A matches, the last of which came against Kent in the 2005 Cheltenham & Gloucester Trophy. In his 6 matches, he scored 28 runs at a batting average of 7.00, with a high score of 12. Behind the stumps he took 5 catches and made a single stumping.
