= Matthew Holland (cricketer) =

English cricketer

Personal information
- Full name: Matthew Holland
- Born: 9 December 1971 (age 54); Worcester, Worcestershire, England
- Batting: Right-handed
- Bowling: Slow left-arm orthodox

Domestic team information
- Years: Team
- 1989–1996: Wiltshire

Career statistics
Competition	LA
Matches	2
Runs scored	0
Batting average	0.00
100s/50s	–/–
Top score	0*
Balls bowled	102
Wickets	–
Bowling average	–
5 wickets in innings	–
10 wickets in match	–
Best bowling	–
Catches/stumpings	–/–
- Source: Cricinfo, 10 October 2010

Matthew Holland (born 9 December 1971) is a former English cricketer. Holland was a right-handed batsman who bowled slow left-arm orthodox. He was born at Worcester, Worcestershire.

Holland made his Minor Counties Championship debut for Wiltshire in 1989 against Berkshire. From 1989 to 1996, he represented the county in 23 Minor Counties Championship matches, the last of which came against Devon. Holland also represented Wiltshire in the MCCA Knockout Trophy. His debut in that competition came against Devon in 1989. He next represented Wiltshire in this competition in 1995 and from 1995 to 1996, he represented the county in 4 further Trophy matches, the last of which came against Hertfordshire.

Holland also represented Wiltshire in 2 List A matches against Warwickshire in the 1989 NatWest Trophy and Surrey in the 1990 NatWest Trophy.
