= Russ Peterson =

Russ Peterson or Russell Peterson may refer to:

- Russ Peterson (gridiron football) (1905–1971), American football offensive lineman
- Russ Peterson (coach), American college basketball, football, and baseball coach in the 1930s to 1950s
- Russell W. Peterson (1916–2011), American politician

== See also ==
- Peter Russell (disambiguation)
