= James Ridge =

James Ridge may refer to:

- Sterling Ridge (James Sterling Ridge, 1936–2012), American politician
- James Ridge (cricketer) (born 1943), English cricketer
- James Ridge (priest) (born 1977), English Anglican priest
