= John Savin =

English cricketer

Personal information
- Full name: John Richard Savin
- Born: 23 November 1942 (age 83); Malmesbury, Wiltshire, England
- Batting: Right-handed
- Bowling: Right-arm fast-medium

Domestic team information
- Years: Team
- 1963–1978: Wiltshire

Career statistics
| Competition | LA |
|---|---|
| Matches | 3 |
| Runs scored | 21 |
| Batting average | 7.00 |
| 100s/50s | –/– |
| Top score | 18 |
| Balls bowled | 162 |
| Wickets | 1 |
| Bowling average | 111.00 |
| 5 wickets in innings | – |
| 10 wickets in match | – |
| Best bowling | 1/46 |
| Catches/stumpings | 1/– |
- Source: Cricinfo, 10 October 2010

John Richard Savin (born 23 November 1942) is a former English cricketer. Savin was a right-handed batsman who bowled right-arm fast-medium. He was born at Malmesbury, Wiltshire.

Savin made his Minor Counties Championship debut for Wiltshire in 1963 against Dorset. From 1963 to 1978, he represented the county in 57 Minor Counties Championship matches, the last of which came against Berkshire.

Savin also represented Wiltshire in List-A matches. His debut List-A match came against Hampshire in the 1964 Gillette Cup. His second also came against Hampshire in the 1972 Gillette Cup, with his third and final List-A match coming also against Hampshire in the 1967 Gillette Cup. In his 3 List-A matches, he scored 21 runs at a batting average of 7.00, with a high score of 18. In the field he took a single catch. With the ball he took a single wicket at a bowling average of 111.00, with best figures of 1/46.
