= Ricky Marsh (journalist) =

English journalist

Ernest Henry "Ricky" Marsh (26 August 1926 – 31 March 2015) was The Daily Telegraph’s foreign editor for 25 years from 1961.

Marsh was educated at Ilford County High School after which he worked for the Ilford Guardian and the Dagenham Post. He worked as a Bevin Boy and subsequently as an officer in the Royal Army Service Corps and as a public relations officer in postwar Germany. Marsh then worked for British United Press and Associated Press before joining Reuters and lastly The Daily Telegraph.

Marsh married Kay Ramsay with whom he had two sons, one of whom was the literary agent Paul Marsh.
