= Gerald Meale =

English cricketer

Gerald Meale (born Robert Gerald James Meale on 18 December 1947, in Hammersmith, Middlesex) was an English cricketer. He was a right-handed batsman and wicket-keeper who played for Wiltshire.

Having appeared for the team in the Minor Counties Championship since 1974, Meale made two List A appearances for the team, the first in 1983 and the second a season later, in his final year playing for the team.

In the only innings in which he batted, he scored 19 runs, the second highest score of the Wiltshire team.
