= Philip Thorn =

English cricketer (1951–2024)

Personal information
- Full name: Philip Leslie Thorn
- Born: 17 November 1951; St George, Bristol, England
- Died: 28 September 2024 (aged 72); Bristol, England
- Batting: Right-handed
- Bowling: Slow left-arm orthodox

Domestic team information
- Years: Team
- 1993–1997: Herefordshire
- 1980–1984: Wiltshire
- 1974: Gloucestershire

Career statistics
Competition	FC	LA
Matches	4	3
Runs scored	45	16
Batting average	11.25	5.33
100s/50s	–/–	–/–
Top score	25	15
Balls bowled	288	102
Wickets	4	1
Bowling average	56.75	79.00
5 wickets in innings	–	–
10 wickets in match	–	–
Best bowling	2/53	1/47
Catches/stumpings	4/–	1/–
- Source: Cricinfo, 12 October 2010

Philip Leslie Thorn (17 November 1951 – 28 September 2024) was an English cricketer. Thorn was a right-handed batsman who bowled slow left-arm orthodox. He was born at St George, Bristol. His father, John Thorn, became captain of the local cricket club.

== Biography ==
Thorn made his first-class debut for Gloucestershire against Surrey in 1974 County Championship. Thorn played 3 further first-class matches in 1974, the last of which came against Essex. In his 4 first-class matches, he scored 45 runs at a batting average of 11.25, with a high score of 25. With the ball he took 4 wickets at a bowling average of 56.75, with best figures of 2/53. Thorn also made his debut in List A cricket for Gloucestershire. His debut List A match came against Lancashire in the 1974 John Player League. This was the only List A match he played for Gloucestershire.

Thorn joined Wiltshire in 1980, making his Minor Counties Championship debut for the county against Berkshire. From 1980 to 1984, he represented the county in 39 Minor Counties Championship matches, the last of which came against Berkshire. Thorn also represented Wiltshire in the MCCA Knockout Trophy, making his debut in that tournament against Shropshire in 1983. From 1983 to 1984, he represented the county in 4 Trophy matches, the last of which came against Dorset.

He also represented Wiltshire in a 2 List A matches. The first came against Northamptonshire in the 1983 NatWest Trophy, with the second coming against Leicestershire in the 1984 NatWest Trophy at the County Ground, Swindon. In his 4 career List A matches, he scored 16 runs at an average of 5.33, with a high score of 15, while in the field he took a single catch. With the ball he took a single wicket at an average of 79.00, with best figures of 1/47.

In 1993, Thorn joined Herefordshire. From 1993 to 1997, he represented the county in 10 Minor Counties Championship matches, the last of which came against Shropshire. Thorn was Western League player of the year in 1979 and in 1995.

Thorn died on 28 September 2024, at the age of 72.
