= Richard Gulliver =

English cricketer (born 1942)

Personal information
- Full name: Richard James Gulliver
- Born: 20 November 1942 (age 83); Bowerchalke, Wiltshire, England
- Batting: Left-handed
- Bowling: Right-arm medium

Domestic team information
- Years: Team
- 1979: Minor Counties South
- 1976: Minor Counties West
- 1966–1983: Wiltshire

Career statistics
Competition	LA
Matches	8
Runs scored	83
Batting average	10.37
100s/50s	–/–
Top score	21
Balls bowled	407
Wickets	4
Bowling average	68.25
5 wickets in innings	–
10 wickets in match	–
Best bowling	1/24
Catches/stumpings	–/–
- Source: Cricinfo, 10 October 2010

Richard James Gulliver (born 20 November 1942) is a former English cricketer. Gulliver was a left-handed batsman who bowled right-arm medium pace. He was born at Bowerchalke, Wiltshire.

Gulliver made his Minor Counties Championship debut for Wiltshire in 1966 against Berkshire. From 1966 to 1983, he represented the county in 98 Minor Counties Championship matches, the last of which came against Devon. He also represented Wiltshire in the MCCA Knockout Trophy. He played 3 matches for the county in that competition, 2 in 1983 which came against Norfolk and Cheshire and a single match in 1984 against Dorset.

Gulliver also represented Wiltshire in List A matches. His debut List A match came against Essex in the 1969 Gillette Cup, followed by 2 further List A matches, both against Hampshire in the 1972 and 1973 Gillette Cup. His fourth and final List A appearance for Wiltshire came against Northamptonshire in the 1983 NatWest Trophy. Gulliver also represented Minor Counties West in 3 List A matches in the 1976 Benson and Hedges Cup. In 1979, he played a single List A match for Minor Counties South in the Benson and Hedges Cup against Gloucestershire. In his combined List A matches, he scored 83 runs at a batting average of 10.37, with a high score of 21. With the ball he took 4 wickets at a bowling average of 68.25, with best figures of 1/24.
