= David Simpkins (cricketer, born 1962) =

English cricketer (born 1962)

Personal information
- Full name: David Paul Simpkins
- Born: 28 March 1962 (age 64); Chippenham, Wiltshire, England
- Batting: Right-handed
- Bowling: Right-arm off break
- Relatives: David Simpkins (father)

Domestic team information
- Years: Team
- 1982: Gloucestershire
- 1981-1993: Wiltshire

Career statistics
Competition	FC	LA
Matches	1	5
Runs scored	1	117
Batting average	1.00	29.25
100s/50s	–/–	–/–
Top score	1*	48
Balls bowled	12	198
Wickets	–	2
Bowling average	–	61.50
5 wickets in innings	–	–
10 wickets in match	–	–
Best bowling	–	2/33
Catches/stumpings	–/–	3/–
- Source: Cricinfo, 9 October 2010

David Paul Simpkins (born 28 March 1962) is a former English cricketer. Simpkins was a right-handed batsman who bowled right-arm off break. He was born at Chippenham, Wiltshire.

Simpkins made his Minor Counties Championship debut for Wiltshire against Oxfordshire in 1981. From 1981 to 1993, he represented the county in 85 Minor Counties Championship matches, the last of which came against Dorset.

The year following his debut for Wiltshire saw Simpkins play a single first-class match for Gloucestershire against Middlesex in the County Championship. This was to be his only appearance for Gloucestershire.

Simpkins also represented Wiltshire in the MCCA Knockout Trophy. His debut in that competition came against Norfolk in 1983. From 1983 to 1993, he represented Wiltshire in 15 Trophy matches, the last of which came against Staffordshire.

Simpkins also represented Wiltshire in List-A cricket. His List-A debut for the county came against Leicestershire in the 1984 NatWest Trophy. From 1984 to 1993, he represented the county in 5 matches, the last of which came against Durham in the 1993 NatWest Trophy. In his 5 List-A matches, he scored 117 runs at a batting average of 29.25, with a high score of 48. With the ball he took 2 wickets at a bowling average of 61.50, with best figures of 2/33.

== Family ==
His father, also called David also represented Wiltshire in List-A and Minor Counties cricket.
