= Edward Thompson (FDNY Commissioner) =

Edward Thompson (July 19, 1913 – August 5, 1995) was appointed the 19th Fire Commissioner of the City of New York by Mayor Robert F. Wagner on January 1, 1962, and served in that position until his resignation on August 6, 1964. The FDNY has named a medal for Outstanding Courage in his honor.

== Biography ==
He was born in Queens, New York on July 19, 1913, to Herman Thompson and Gertrude Emma Baatz. While attending the Brooklyn Law School in 1936 he became a probationary firefighter, later being promoted to a lieutenant in a hook-and-ladder company. In 1938 Mayor Fiorello La Guardia appointed him as an assistant legal counsel to the New York City Fire Department where he prosecuted fire-code violators.

He was appointed the 19th New York City Fire Commissioner by Mayor Robert F. Wagner on January 1, 1962, and he served in that position until his resignation on August 6, 1964.

He died on August 5, 1995, in Babylon, New York of cancer.

Fire appointments
Preceded by Edward F. Cavanagh Jr.	FDNY Commissioner; 1962–1964	Succeeded by Martin Scott
