= Stephen Perrin =

English cricketer and footballer

Personal information
- Full name: Stephen Michael Perrin
- Born: 27 October 1970 (age 56); Bradford-on-Avon, Wiltshire, England
- Batting: Right-handed
- Role: Wicketkeeper

Domestic team information
- Years: Team
- 1989-2005: Wiltshire

Career statistics
Competition	LA
Matches	5
Runs scored	65
Batting average	13.00
100s/50s	–/–
Top score	34
Balls bowled	–
Wickets	–
Bowling average	–
5 wickets in innings	–
10 wickets in match	–
Best bowling	–
Catches/stumpings	2/3
- Source: Cricinfo, 12 October 2010

Stephen Michael Perrin (born 27 October 1970) is a former English cricketer. Perrin was a right-handed batsman. He also played football at semi-professional level for Forest Green Rovers and Melksham Town, Chippenham Town and Bath City. Very talented sportsman very similar to his older brother Darren. Born - Bradford on Avon

Perrin made his Minor Counties Championship debut for Wiltshire in 1989 against Wales Minor Counties. From 1989 to 2004, he represented the county in 100 Minor Counties Championship matches, the last of which came against Wales Minor Counties. Perrin also represented Wiltshire in the MCCA Knockout Trophy. His debut in that competition came against Devon in 1991. From 1991 to 2005, he represented the county in 26 Trophy matches, the last of which came against Cornwall.

Perrin also represented Wiltshire in List A cricket. His List A debut came against Durham in the 1993 NatWest Trophy. From 1993 to 2001, he represented the county in 5 List A matches, the last of which came against Ireland in the 1st round of the 2002 Cheltenham & Gloucester Trophy which was played in 2001. In his 5 matches, he scored 65 runs at a batting average of 13.00, with a high score of 34. Behind the stumps he took 2 catches and made 3 stumpings.
