= Paul Marsh (English cricketer) =

English cricketer (born 1966)

Personal information
- Full name: Paul Michael Marsh
- Born: 20 December 1966 (age 59); Bradford-on-Avon, Wiltshire, England
- Batting: Right-handed
- Bowling: Right-arm medium

Domestic team information
- Years: Team
- 1992–2002: Wiltshire

Career statistics
Competition	List A
Matches	2
Runs scored	3
Batting average	1.50
100s/50s	0/0
Top score	2
Balls bowled	90
Wickets	1
Bowling average	63.00
5 wickets in innings	0
10 wickets in match	0
Best bowling	1/35
Catches/stumpings	0/–
- Source: Cricinfo, 12 October 2010

Paul Michael Marsh (born 20 December 1966) is a former English cricketer. Marsh was a right-handed batsman who bowled right-arm medium pace. He was born in Bradford-on-Avon, Wiltshire.

Marsh made his Minor Counties Championship debut for Wiltshire in 1992 against Berkshire. From 1992 to 1994, he represented the county in 20 Minor Counties Championship matches, the last of which came against Cornwall. Marsh also represented Wiltshire in the MCCA Knockout Trophy during two spells with the county. His debut in that competition came against Cornwall in 1993. During his first spell with the county he played 7 Trophy matches. In his second spell from 2001 to 2002, he represented the county in 6 Trophy matches, the last of which came against Devon.

Marsh also represented Wiltshire in List A cricket. His List A debut came against Durham in the 1993 NatWest Trophy, which was during his first spell with the county. His second and last List A match came during his second spell and came against Ireland in the 1st round of the 2002 Cheltenham & Gloucester Trophy which was played in 2001. In his 2 matches, he scored 3 runs at a batting average of 1.50, with a high score of 2. With the ball he took a single wicket at a bowling average of 63.00, with best figures of 1/35.
