= Martin Scott (FDNY Commissioner) =

Martin Richard Scott (January 9, 1898 – February 10, 1979) was appointed the 20th Fire Commissioner of the City of New York by Mayor Robert F. Wagner on August 6, 1964, and served in that position until the end of the Wagner Administration on December 31, 1965. The FDNY has named a medal for Outstanding Courage in his honor.

== Biography ==
Scott was appointed Fire Commissioner having served in all the Fire Marshal's ranks in the FDNY, rising to the top as Chief Fire Marshal prior to his commissioner's appointment. Scott was never a firefighter, but was one of the original non-uniformed Fire Marshals. He died on February 10, 1979, in Edison, New Jersey.

Fire appointments
Preceded by Edward Thompson	FDNY Commissioner; 1964–1965	Succeeded by Robert O. Lowery
