= Martin Scott (cricketer) =

English cricketer (born 1943)

Martin Scott (born 6 November 1943) was an English cricketer. He was a right-handed batsman and wicket-keeper who played for Wiltshire. He was born in Corsham.

Having represented the team in the Minor Counties Championship since 1966, Scott made a single List A appearance for the team, during the 1972 season, against Hampshire. From the upper-middle order, he scored a duck.
