= Paul Marsh (literary agent) =

English literary agent (1952-2009)

- Born: Paul Henry Marsh; 30 October 1952; East London, England
- Died: 5 July 2009 (aged 56); Milan, Italy
- Education: Peterhouse, Cambridge; University of Göttingen
- Occupation: Literary agent
- Known for: International rights and translation rights sales; co-founder of The Marsh Agency
- Spouses: Angela Astor; Susanna (Susie) Nicklin
- Children: 5
- Relatives: Ricky Marsh (father)

Paul Henry Marsh (30 October 1952 - 5 July 2009) was an English literary agent who was described by The Independent on Sunday as "one of the key players in this globalisation of literary culture".

Marsh was born in East London in 1952, one of two sons of Ricky Marsh, the foreign editor of The Daily Telegraph.

== Early life and education ==
Marsh was born in East London and was the son of journalist Ricky Marsh, a foreign editor at The Daily Telegraph. He was educated at Dulwich College before reading English at Peterhouse, Cambridge.

In 1994, Marsh co-founded The Marsh Agency with his wife, Susanna (Susie) Nicklin.

== Death ==
Marsh died on 5 July 2009 in Milan while visiting publishers and clients. His death was reported as being caused by a pulmonary embolism.
