= David Simpkins (cricketer, born 1934) =

English cricketer (1934–2009)

Personal information
- Full name: David William Simpkins
- Born: 24 May 1934; Derry Hill, Wiltshire, England
- Died: 6 August 2009 (aged 75); Chippenham, Wiltshire, England
- Batting: Left-handed
- Role: Wicketkeeper
- Relatives: David Simpkins (son)

Domestic team information
- Years: Team
- 1963-1975: Wiltshire

Career statistics
Competition	LA
Matches	2
Runs scored	7
Batting average	3.50
100s/50s	–/–
Top score	5
Balls bowled	–
Wickets	–
Bowling average	–
5 wickets in innings	–
10 wickets in match	–
Best bowling	–
Catches/stumpings	1/1
- Source: Cricinfo, 9 October 2010

David William Simpkins (29 May 1934 – 6 August 2009) was an English cricketer. Simpkins was a left-handed batsman who played primarily as a wicketkeeper. He was born at Derry Hill, Wiltshire.

Simpkins made his Minor Counties Championship debut for Wiltshire against Dorset in 1963. From 1963 to 1975, he represented the county in 20 Minor Counties Championship matches, the last of which came against Dorset.

Simpkins also represented Wiltshire in 2 List-A matches. His List-A debut for the county came against Essex in the 1969 Gillette Cup. His second and final List-A match for Wiltshire came against Hampshire in the 1973 Gillette Cup. In his 2 List-A matches, he scored 7 runs at a batting average of 3.50, with a high score of 5. Behind the stumps he took a single catch and made a single stumping.

== Personal life and death ==
Simpkins died in Chippenham on 6 August 2009, at the age of 75.

His son, also called David also represented Wiltshire in List-A and Minor Counties cricket, as well as playing a single first-class match for Gloucestershire.
