= Paul Glasson =

Australian investor and businessman

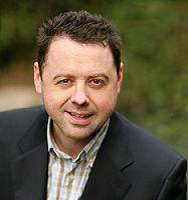
- Born: 16 October 1973 (age 53); Melbourne, Australia
- Education: La Trobe University
- Occupations: Chairman, Satori Investments Greater China; Director, Aokai Co. Ltd

Paul Glasson is an Australian investor and businessman. He is the chairman of Satori Investments Greater China and a life member of the Australia China Business Council, awarded for his many years' service leading the council's presence in China between 2008 and 2014. He lived in China from the mid-1990s until returning to Australia in 2018, and is recognised in industry as one of the foremost experts on outbound investments by Chinese enterprises. In 2009 he was described by The Australian newspaper as one of the most influential Australians living in China.

Glasson was one of only two Australians chosen as a Young Leader for the Boao Forum in 2009, 2010, and again in 2013. He was the first Australian based in China to focus entirely on Chinese outbound activity, starting in 2000. He has been involved in a number of cross-border transactions between Australia and China, including 2014 Mines and Money's Deal of the Year (Asia) acting as the lead financial adviser in the $1.4 billion joint takeover of Aquila Resources Limited by Baosteel and Aurizon, and has been published on many occasions times in the Australian and Chinese media, and is at times quoted in Australian and international media for his China expertise.

== Early life ==
Growing up in suburban Melbourne, Glasson began legal studies at La Trobe University before turning to philosophy full-time, with a focus on ontology and hermeneutics.

After gaining some corporate experience Glasson returned to university where he studied Chinese philosophy which prompted his move to China. He arrived in Beijing in 1997, aged 24, then also Shijiazhuang, Kunshan, and resided in Shanghai until 2018 when he returned to Sydney, where he is married with two children.

== Past experience ==
During 2004-2008 Glasson held the role as strategic alliance partner for KPMG Australia. The role's primary focus was to lead and develop KPMG Australia's presence in China and provision of corporate advisory services to Chinese companies investing into Australia.

Mr Glasson developed this business together with the Western Australian division of KPMG and assisted to develop from a near zero market share to more than half market share in transaction numbers during that period.

== Deal making ==
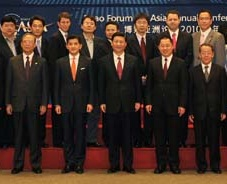
Paul Glasson with the current CPC General Secretary Xi Jinping at Boao Forum 2010

Paul Glasson established Satori Investments Greater China in 2001 to focus on outbound activities of Chinese companies and to assist western and multi-national companies to raise capital for large capex projects in Australia and other jurisdictions.

In his role as Chairman of Satori Investments Paul Glasson has been recognized in the Deal magazine of the Australian Newspaper, and other media, as one of the foremost experts on Chinese outbound transactions.

Glasson has been involved in promoting and broadening the bilateral relationship between Australia and China. He has worked with major Chinese banks, state-planning departments, and financial institutions gain the approvals and funding needed to fulfill China's official imperative to "go global".

Satori Investments has been involved in more than 20 successful transactions involving Chinese capital into Australia over a period of 14 years including more than $10Bn of capital raised into projects in Australia.

Year	Amount	Project	Role
2014	$1.4b	Joint Takeover of Aquila by Baosteel and Aurizon	Lead Financial Adviser
2013	-	Aurizon and Major SOE – Relationship Agreement	Lead Adviser
2013	$130m	Off-take Agreement with State Owned Trading Company	Chief Negotiator to Atlas
2012	$45m	Off-take Agreement with State Owned Steel Mill	Chief Negotiator to Atlas
2012	$66m	Off-take Agreement with Private Steel Mill	Chief Negotiator to Atlas
2012	$13.8m	Rey Resources 22% placement to ASF Group	Lead Financial Adviser
2011	$40m	Forge Resources Purchasing of Balla Balla Project from Atlas Iron	Lead Financial Adviser
2011	$250m	Atlas Iron Acquisition of FerrAus	In-China Financial Adviser
2010	$1.3b	Dual Gas & CNEEC IDGCC Power Plant	Lead Financial Adviser
2010	$1.1b	Aurox and Atlas Iron Merger	Lead Adviser to Aurox
2010	$65m	Brookdale Mining Coal Acquisition	Lead Adviser to Brookdale
2010	Confidential	Aurox Balla Balla-Heads of Agreement-MCC EPC & Debt Services	Lead Adviser
2009	$265m	Aquila 15% Placement to Baosteel	Lead Adviser to Aquila
2009	$140m	MRL Acquisition of Polaris Metals	Joint Adviser to Polaris
2009	$7b	Proposed FMG Debt Facility from EXIM Bank (Unconsummated)	Lead Adviser
2009	$25m	GRD Cape Lambert Engineering Contract	Lead Adviser
2009	$110m	CNOOC Bonaparte Basin	Joint Adviser on Exploration Project
2008	$3b	Proposed Yilgarn Infrastructure Project	Joint Business Adviser
2008	$1.8b	Proposed Baosteel Acquisition of FMG Shareholding	Joint Financial Adviser
2007	$30m	FMG Baosteel Magnetite Cooperation	Joint Financial Adviser
2007	$4.5b	Citic Pacific – EPC Advice to MCC; Citic Pacific	Joint Financial Adviser
2007	$1.3b	Sinosteel acquisition of Midwest	Joint Independent Adviser to Midwest
2007	$50m	Vanke Group Bond Issue	Lead Arranger
2006	$1b	Australasian Resources Shougang JV	Joint Adviser
2006	$130m	HRL – Harbin Low Emissions Power Plant Funding(LETDF)	Joint Financial Adviser
2005	$40m	Shanghai Light Industry Group Co. Ltd Real Estate Development	Lead Financial Adviser
2005	$55m	Da Shi Men Mall Development	Lead Financial Adviser

== Promotion of Bilateral Ties: Australia and China ==
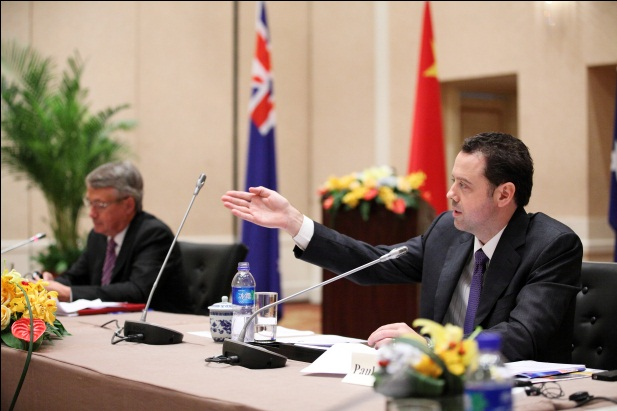
Australian Deputy Prime Minister Wayne Swan (left) with Paul Glasson (right) at Australia China High-Level Industry Dialogue in Beijing in 2012.

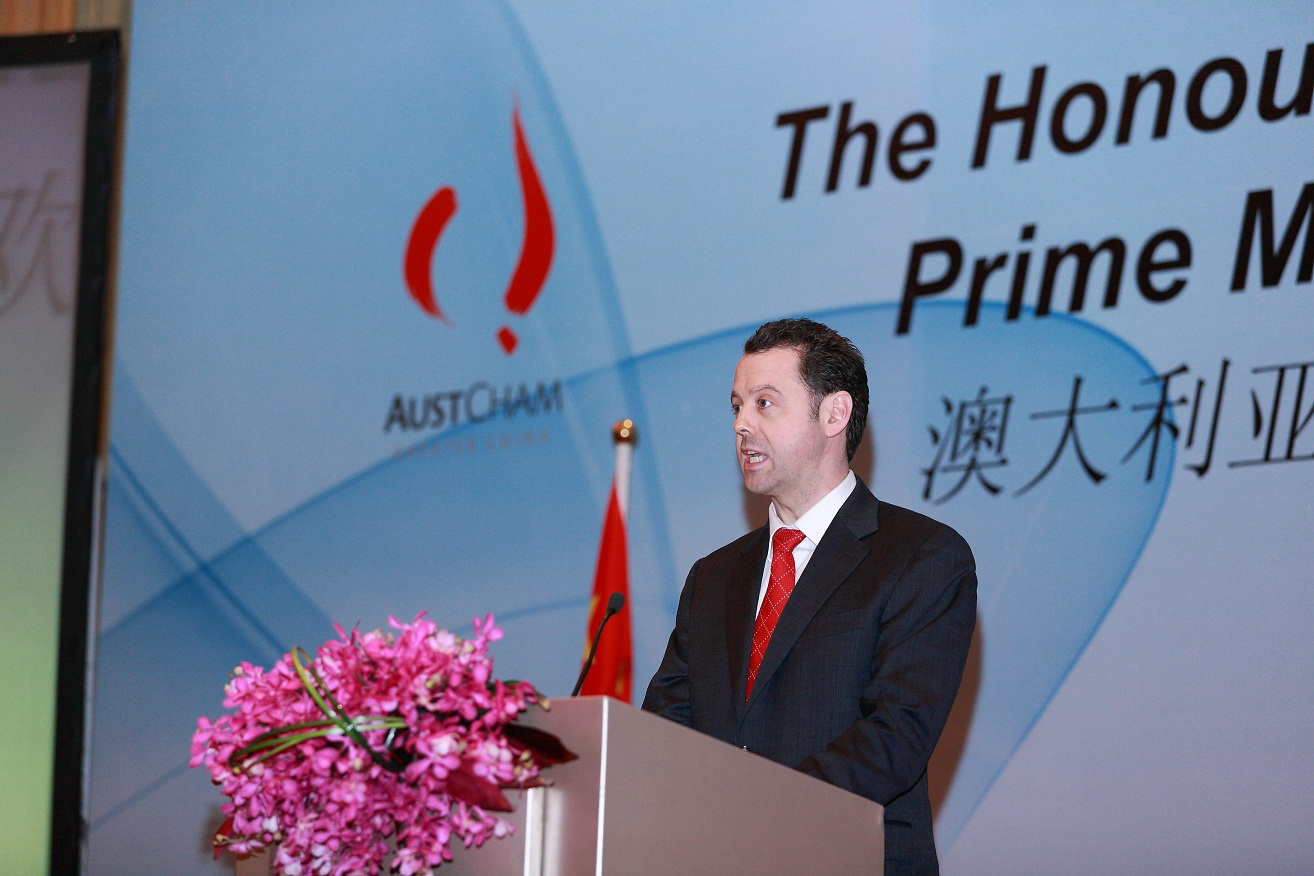
Paul Glasson speaking at the welcome luncheon for the Australian Prime Minister The Hon Julia Gillard in Beijing, 9 April 2013

Glasson has contributed seven years to developing and leading the Australia China Business Council's work in China and as National Vice President in Australia. Glasson was recognized for his service in March 2015 as one of only five Life Members of the Australia China Business Council.The role remains pro bono.

Glasson took up the role of President of China Operations in 2013, having served as National Vice President since 2012 and the Chief Representative in China since 2008.

For a long period Glasson lead the council's strategy and interaction with key stakeholders in China and Australia.

Paul Glasson plays a pivotal advocacy role with the Australia China Business Council in promoting bi-lateral trade and investment ties including establishing the Australia China Economic & Trade Forum (ACETF) held in 2013 and 2011 as part of Prime Minister of Australia Julia Gillard visit to China, 2009 as part of Vice Premier Li Keqiang's visit to Australia; 2010 as part of Vice President Xi Jinping's visit to Australia. Glasson also run the Dialogue of the Minister of Commerce People's Republic of China & Australian Business Leaders in 2014 in Sydney; the High Level Economic Dialogues in 2011 in Resources and Infrastructure in Beijing; as well as the three stream HLED held in Beijing as part of the Deputy Prime Minister's visit to China in 2012 covering resources and energy, financial services, and science and technology.
