= Craig Gibbens =

English cricketer

Personal information
- Full name: Craig Richard Gibbens
- Born: 14 October 1965 (age 61); Bristol, England
- Batting: Right-handed
- Bowling: Right-arm medium

Domestic team information
- Years: Team
- 1996–2002: Wiltshire

Career statistics
Competition	LA
Matches	4
Runs scored	4
Batting average	4.00
100s/50s	–/–
Top score	3*
Balls bowled	240
Wickets	4
Bowling average	26.75
5 wickets in innings	–
10 wickets in match	–
Best bowling	2/27
Catches/stumpings	–/–
- Source: Cricinfo, 11 October 2010

Craig Richard Gibbens (born 14 October 1965) is a former English cricketer. Gibbens was a right-handed batsman who bowled right-arm medium pace. He was born in Bristol.

Gibbens made his Minor Counties Championship debut for Wiltshire in 1996 against Berkshire. From 1996 to 2002, he represented the county in 25 Minor Counties Championship matches, the last of which came against Cheshire. Gibbens also represented Wiltshire in the MCCA Knockout Trophy. His debut in that competition came against the Somerset Cricket Board in 2000. From 2000 to 2002, he represented the county in 12 Trophy matches, the last of which came against Devon.

Gibbens also represented Wiltshire in List A cricket. His List A debut came against Scotland in the 2000 NatWest Trophy. From 2000 to 2001 he represented the county in 4 List A matches, the last of which came against Ireland in the 1st round of the 2002 Cheltenham & Gloucester Trophy which was played in 2001. In his 4 matches, he took 4 wickets at a bowling average of 26.75, with best figures of 2/27.
