= Anthony Marshall (cricketer) =

English cricketer

Personal information
- Full name: Anthony Granville Marshall
- Born: 10 September 1932; Isleworth, Middlesex, England
- Died: 5 December 1988 (aged 56); Bristol, England
- Batting: Right-handed
- Bowling: Right-arm medium-fast

Domestic team information
- Years: Team
- 1950–1954: Kent
- 1955–1970: Wiltshire

Career statistics
| Competition | First-class | List A |
|---|---|---|
| Matches | 6 | 3 |
| Runs scored | 37 | 41 |
| Batting average | 3.70 | 20.50 |
| 100s/50s | 0/0 | 0/0 |
| Top score | 7 | 31* |
| Balls bowled | 936 | 228 |
| Wickets | 13 | 3 |
| Bowling average | 30.69 | 33.33 |
| 5 wickets in innings | 1 | 0 |
| 10 wickets in match | 0 | 0 |
| Best bowling | 6/53 | 3/36 |
| Catches/stumpings | 1/– | 0/– |
- Source: CricInfo, 15 May 2010

Anthony Granville Marshall (10 September 1932 – 5 December 1988) was an English cricketer. Marshall was a right-handed batsman who bowled right-arm medium-fast.

Marshall made his first-class cricket debut for Kent County Cricket Club against Glamorgan in 1950. Marshall represented Kent in four further first-class matches against Essex and Nottinghamshire in 1950, Cambridge University in 1953 and Oxford University in 1954. In his 5 first-class matches for the county, he took 7 wickets at a bowling average of 44.00.

In 1955, Marshall joined Wiltshire, where he represented the county in the Minor Counties Championship until 1970. Marshall also played three List-A cricket matches for Wiltshire against Hampshire in 1964, Nottinghamshire in 1965 and Essex in 1969, with all three fixtures coming in the Gillette Cup.

In 1967, he played his final first-class match for a combined Minor Counties team against the touring Pakistanis, where in their second innings he claimed his career best first-class bowling figures by taking 6/53.

Marshall died at Bristol in 1988 aged 56.
