= James Hurn =

English cricketer

James Hurn (10 November 1926 – 23 March 2003) was an English cricketer. He was a left-handed batsman who played for Wiltshire. He was born in Melksham.

Hurn, who played for Wiltshire in the Minor Counties Championship between 1952 and 1961, made his sole List A appearance for the team in the 1964 Gillette Cup, against Hampshire. Batting in the upper order, he scored 8 runs, though Wiltshire slipped to a defeat by a 120-run margin.
