= David Richards (cricketer) =

English cricketer (1931–2017)

Personal information
- Full name: David Michael Richards
- Born: 8 November 1931; Bath, Somerset, England
- Died: 6 January 2017 (aged 85); Banbury, Oxfordshire, England
- Batting: Right-handed
- Bowling: Right-arm fast-medium

Domestic team information
- Years: Team
- 1949–1965: Wiltshire

Career statistics
Competition	LA
Matches	2
Runs scored	11
Batting average	5.50
100s/50s	–/–
Top score	11
Balls bowled	–
Wickets	–
Bowling average	–
5 wickets in innings	–
10 wickets in match	–
Best bowling	–
Catches/stumpings	1/–
- Source: Cricinfo, 10 October 2010

David Michael Richards (8 November 1931 – 6 January 2017) was an English cricketer. Richards was a right-handed batsman who bowled right-arm fast-medium. He was born at Bath, Somerset and educated at Cheltenham College.

Richards made his Minor Counties Championship debut for Wiltshire in 1949 against the Kent Second XI. From 1949 to 1965, he represented the county in 34 Minor Counties Championship matches, the last of which came against Dorset.

Richards also represented Wiltshire in 2 List-A matches. His debut List-A match came against Hampshire in the 1964 Gillette Cup. His second and final List-A match came against Nottinghamshire in the 1965 Gillette Cup. In his 2 List-A matches, he scored 11 runs at a batting average of 5.50, with a high score of 11. In the field he took a single catch.

Richards died in Banbury, Oxfordshire on 6 January 2017, at the age of 85.
