= Peter Russell (cricketer) =

English cricketer (born 1939)

Edwin Peter Russell (commonly known as Peter Russell; born 12 August 1939) was an English cricketer. He was a right-handed batsman who played for Wiltshire. He was born in Salisbury.

Having appeared in a small number of Minor Counties Championship matches between 1959 and 1960, Russell made his sole List A appearance for the team during the Gillette Cup competition of 1964 against Hampshire, scoring eight runs.

Russell's best recorded Minor Counties Championship score of 40 came in his final game, against Berkshire.
