= Martin Scott (military officer) =

Brevet Lieutenant Colonel Martin Scott (January 18, 1788, Bennington, Vermont – September 8, 1847, Molino del Rey, Mexico) was a career officer in the United States Army who was a signatory to the Treaty of St. Peters in 1837.

== Early life ==
Martin Scott was born in Bennington, Vermont on January 18, 1788. He was the son of Phineas Scott - one of the early settlers of Bennington. He was also a member of the Bennington organization the Sons of Liberty along with other local notables such as Hiram Harwood.

He had a common school education and legendary skill as a marksman. He was known to drive nails with bullets and prided himself on being able to kill animals with shots to the head rather than to the body. He was barred from participating in turkey shoots (as his skill with a rifle gave him an unfair advantage) and was known to brag that once a raccoon surrendered to him in preference to being shot.

== Military career ==
During the War of 1812, he was commissioned as a 2nd lieutenant in the 26th Infantry in April 1814. The next month he was promoted to 1st lieutenant. Soon after the war's conclusion, he was discharged in June 1815.

In June 1818, he re-entered the Army as a 2nd lieutenant in the Regiment of Riflemen. He was promoted to 1st lieutenant in November 1819 and was transferred to the 5th Infantry in June 1821.

He was promoted to captain in August 1828 and represented the U.S. Army at the signing of the Treaty of St. Peters between the United States and the Ojibwa tribes. The treaty ceded land in Minnesota and Wisconsin.

Capt. Scott was in command of Fort Mackinac on Mackinac Island, Michigan, in 1842. He was described by an acquaintance as “an interesting man, with strong, alert, athletic figure, bright, eager, keen grey eyes, and ruddy face, bronzed by long exposure. He was a great disciplinarian, and the fort was clean and orderly in the extreme.”

Scott was unpopular with his fellow officers as he was perceived as being stingy (although Martin's frugality resulted from his spending most of his money to support his mother and sister back in Vermont). He was also viewed as being anti-social as he did not drink nor gamble. He once fought a duel in which both parties were wounded but survived.

He married late in life at the age of in 1840 to Miss Lavinia McCracken of Rochester, New York.

=== Mexican–American War ===
Scott saw active service during the Mexican–American War. In May 1846, he fought under Major General Zachary Taylor at the battles of Palo Alto and Resaca de la Palma and received a brevet (honorary promotion) to major. He was promoted to the full rank of major on June 29, 1846.

He also received a brevet to the rank of lieutenant colonel for heroism at the Battle of Monterey on September 23, 1846. He was killed in action at the Battle of Molino del Rey on September 8, 1847.

A few months after his death Martin Scott's body was brought back from Mexico to Vermont in Feb 1848, escorted by his nephew K. Scott, Esq., with the funeral held on 2 March 1848. The funeral Sermon from Psalms 48:16 was preached by Rev. Justin A. Smith of Bennington, eulogy by Gen. George R. Davis of Troy, NY, with the Masonic funeral service officiated by Bro. Leonard Sargeant, Lt. Governor of Vermont. In attendance were his family, a large concourse of people, the Masonic Fraternity, Odd Fellows, Sons of Temperance, and Rechabites.

Scott's widow Lavinia (née McCracken) Scott would die on 27 Sep 1852, while aboard the American paddle steamer SS Arctic that sank off the coast of Cape Race, Newfoundland. All aboard we lost.

== Legacy ==
In December 1848, the Army established an outpost near Fredericksburg, Texas which was later named Fort Martin Scott. The fort was active until 1853 and is now a tourist attraction. The Masonic lodge, Freedom Lodge No. 100 AF&AM, was chartered on 20 January 1852 by the Grand Lodge of Texas, and is rumored to have met at Fort Martin Scott in Fredericksburg, TX. However the lodge became defunct in "1856 due to a lack of members."

Scott's name is engraved on a plaque in the Texas state Capitol along with other officers of the U.S. Army who fell during the Mexican War.

From his days stationed at Fort Crawford, it is said that he named the Bloody Run Creek, which flows into the Mississippi River from the west, directly across from Prairie du Chien, Wisconsin. According to James Henry Lockwood, then-justice of the peace at Prairie du Chien, then-Lieutenant Scott named the creek for his frequent successful hunting trips.
