= Ernest Désiré Glasson =

French academic and jurist

Ernest Désiré Glasson (1839 - 1907) was a French academic, jurist, professor of civil procedure and specialist in the history of French, Roman, and comparative law.
