= Jamie Glasson =

English cricketer (born 1973)

Personal information
- Full name: Martin Jamie Glasson
- Born: 21 May 1973 (age 53); Salisbury, Wiltshire, England
- Batting: Right-handed
- Bowling: Right-arm medium

Domestic team information
- Years: Team
- 1995–2004: Wiltshire

Career statistics
Competition	LA
Matches	5
Runs scored	54
Batting average	10.80
100s/50s	–/–
Top score	23
Balls bowled	–
Wickets	–
Bowling average	–
5 wickets in innings	–
10 wickets in match	–
Best bowling	–
Catches/stumpings	1/–
- Source: Cricinfo, 12 October 2010

Martin Jamie Glasson (born 21 May 1973) is a former English cricketer. Glasson was a right-handed batsman who bowled right-arm medium pace. He was born in Salisbury, Wiltshire.

Glasson made his Minor Counties Championship debut for Wiltshire in 1995 against Devon. From 1995 to 2004, he represented the county in 42 Minor Counties Championship matches, the last of which came against Herefordshire. Glasson also represented Wiltshire in the MCCA Knockout Trophy. His debut in that competition came against Herefordshire in 1996. From 1996 to 2003, he represented the county in 14 Trophy matches, the last of which came against Buckinghamshire.

Glasson also represented Wiltshire in List A cricket. His List A debut came against the Northamptonshire Cricket Board in the 1999 NatWest Trophy. From 1999 to 2004, he represented the county in 5 List A matches, the last of which came against Nottinghamshire in the 2004 Cheltenham & Gloucester Trophy. In his 5 matches, he scored 54 runs at a batting average of 10.80, with a high score of 23. In the field he took a single catch.
