= Brian White (cricketer) =

English cricketer (born 1944)

Personal information
- Full name: Brian Humphrey White
- Born: 3 October 1944 (age 82); Salisbury, Wiltshire, England
- Batting: Left-handed

Domestic team information
- Years: Team
- 1972–1974: Minor Counties South
- 1964–1991: Wiltshire

Career statistics
Competition	List A
Matches	15
Runs scored	133
Batting average	8.86
100s/50s	–/–
Top score	29
Balls bowled	–
Wickets	–
Bowling average	–
5 wickets in innings	–
10 wickets in match	–
Best bowling	–
Catches/stumpings	2/–
- Source: Cricinfo, 10 October 2010

Brian Humphrey White (born 3 October 1944) is a former English cricketer. White was a left-handed batsman. He was born at Salisbury, Wiltshire.

White made his Minor Counties Championship debut for Wiltshire in 1964 against Dorset. From 1964 to 1991, he represented the county in 162 Minor Counties Championship matches, the last of which came against Buckinghamshire. White also represented Wiltshire in the MCCA Knockout Trophy making his debut in that competition against Shropshire. From 1983 to 1991, he represented the county in 13 Trophy matches, the last of which came against Devon.

White also represented Wiltshire in List-A cricket. His List-A debut came against Nottinghamshire in the 1965 Gillette Cup. From 1965 to 1991, he represented the county in 9 List-A matches, the last of which came against Surrey in the 1990 NatWest Trophy. He also played 8 List-A matches for Minor Counties South in the Benson and Hedges Cup between 1972 and 1974. In his combined 15 List-A matches, he scored 133 runs at a batting average of 8.86 and a high score of 29.
