= Ian Lomax =

English cricketer

Personal information
- Full name: Ian Raymond Lomax
- Born: 30 July 1931; Fulham, London, England
- Died: 31 July 1996 (aged 65); Deane, Hampshire, England
- Role: Batsman

Domestic team information
- Years: Team
- 1950–1970: Wiltshire
- 1962: Somerset
- First-class debut: 7 June 1952 Free Foresters v Cambridge University
- Last First-class: 23 June 1965 Marylebone Cricket Club v Scotland
- List A debut: 1 May 1965 Wiltshire v Nottinghamshire
- Last List A: 11 May 1969 Wiltshire v Essex

Career statistics
Competition	First-class	List A
Matches	12	2
Runs scored	370	113
Batting average	18.50	56.50
100s/50s	0/1	0/2
Top score	83	63
Balls bowled	326	72
Wickets	4	0
Bowling average	57.25	–
5 wickets in innings	0	0
10 wickets in match	0	0
Best bowling	2/45	0/34
Catches/stumpings	6/–	1/–
- Source: CricketArchive, 17 October 2010

Ian Raymond Lomax (30 July 1931 – 31 July 1996) played cricket for more than 20 years for Wiltshire in the Minor Counties and latterly in List A cricket, and also played in first-class matches for a variety of amateur sides, including the Free Foresters and Marylebone Cricket Club (MCC). In 1962, he played in half a dozen first-class games for Somerset, but the life of a day-to-day county cricketer was not for him. He was born in Fulham, London and died at Deane, Hampshire.

== Cricket career ==
Educated at Ludgrove and Eton, Lomax had, according to his obituary in Wisden Cricketers' Almanack, "an Edwardian sense of style and 18th century zest". A middle-order right-handed batsman and an enthusiastic though irregular fast-medium bowler, Lomax was termed "a grand stroke-player" as a schoolboy cricketer in 1949 and did not change his hard-hitting methods much over the years. He started playing for Wiltshire in the Minor Counties in 1950 and made his first-class cricket debut in 1952 for the Free Foresters in a match against Cambridge University. Other individual matches for teams largely composed of amateurs followed in other seasons, and in the summer of 1961 he was a member of a tour organised and captained by former Surrey captain Stuart Surridge to Bermuda.

Lomax's only full-time first-class cricket was a series of six games he played for Somerset at the start of the 1962 season which, according to one account, fulfilled "a long-cherished wish to sample county cricket". Batting in the lower middle order, he had one spectacular innings, making 83 in just 64 minutes, with three sixes and 10 fours, to bring Somerset within sight of an unlikely victory in the match against Hampshire at Taunton. But he left Somerset before the end of May 1962 and did not reappear in first-class county cricket.

Lomax went back to Minor Counties cricket with Wiltshire across the 1960s, regularly captaining the side. In both 1965 and 1969, Wiltshire qualified, as one of the better-performing Minor Counties, for the knock-out phase of the Gillette Cup and though both matches were lost quite comfortably against first-class opposition, Lomax did well in both games. Against Nottinghamshire in 1965, he made 50 out of a Wiltshire total of 157. And his 63 out of 147 against Essex in 1969 included 16 off an over from England Test bowler Robin Hobbs and won Lomax the man of the match award. He played for Wiltshire until 1970.

== Outside cricket ==
Lomax was a farmer at Baydon in Wiltshire and also had extensive interests in horse-racing and hunting. He was master of the Craven Farmers' Hunt and for some years held a racehorse trainer's licence, although the actual trainer was his first wife, Rosemary, who was at the time barred from holding a trainer's licence by the-then rules of the Jockey Club. The Lomaxes married in 1953 and were divorced in the early 1970s; a daughter, Sarah, was the wife of the racing driver James Hunt.
