= Wiltshire County Cricket Club =

English cricket club

Personnel
- Captain: Ed Young
- Coach: Tom Morton

Team information
- Colours
- Founded: 1893
- Home ground: No fixed address

History
- Minor Counties Championship wins: 2
- MCCA Knockout Trophy wins: 0
- FP Trophy wins: 0
- Official website: wiltshireccc.play-cricket.com

Wiltshire County Cricket Club is one of twenty minor county clubs within the domestic cricket structure of England and Wales. Founded in 1893, it represents the historic county of Wiltshire.

The team is a member of the Minor Counties Championship Western Division and plays in the MCCA Knockout Trophy. Wiltshire played List A matches occasionally from 1964 until 2005 but is not classified as a List A team per se.

The club is a member of Wiltshire Cricket Limited, the governing body for cricket in the county.

== Venues ==
The club is peripatetic, playing its matches around the county at:

- Salisbury and South Wiltshire Sports Club, Salisbury
- Station Road, Corsham
- Trowbridge Cricket Club Ground
- London Road, Devizes
- Warminster Cricket Club Ground, Warminster
- County Cricket Ground, Swindon

== Honours ==
- Minor Counties Championship (2) – 1902, 1909

== Earliest cricket ==
Cricket probably reached Wiltshire by the end of the 17th century. The earliest known reference to cricket in the county is dated 1769.

John Major points out that "cricket did not spread evenly across whole counties" but had a tendency towards "local adoption". He mentions a match at Stockton, Wiltshire in 1799 which was reported as "an event so novel in the county of Wiltshire". But cricket was being played by then at several other venues in the county including Calne, Devizes, Marlborough, Salisbury and Westbury.

== Origin of club ==
A county organisation was formed on 24 February 1881. The present Wiltshire CCC was founded in January 1893, and joined the Minor Counties Championship for the 1897 season, competing every season since then.

== History ==
Wiltshire has won the Minor Counties Championship twice, in 1902 and 1909. The Edwardian years were the club's "most successful period" and a 1903 report described the team as "the equal of any first-class county". Wiltshire's original captain, until 1920, was Audley Miller, also of Marylebone Cricket Club (MCC), who had played a Test match for England in South Africa in 1895–96.

Miller was succeeded as captain by Robert Awdry, who had played first-class cricket for Oxford University through 1902–04. Awdry led the side until 1934 and the next captain from 1935 to 1939 was William Lovell-Hewitt, who made 3 first-class appearances for the Minor Counties through 1938–39.

The team experienced some lean seasons after the Second World War but improved during the 1950s under the captaincy of James Hurn. The best players at this time were opening batsman John Thompson, formerly of Warwickshire, who played regularly for Wiltshire from 1955 to 1958; and seamer Anthony Marshall, who played occasionally for Kent and was a Wiltshire stalwart from 1955 to 1970.

David Richards, who played for Wiltshire from 1949 to 1965 was captain in the last three years of his career and the team were championship runners-up in both 1963 and 1964. Long-serving batsman Ian Lomax, who played for Wiltshire from 1950 to 1970, captained the side in the mid-sixties and played first-class for Somerset and MCC. He was succeeded in 1968 by Brian White, who served the county even longer, for 28 seasons from 1964 to 1991. White relinquished the captaincy after the 1980 season.

All-rounder Richard Gulliver succeeded White and was captain until he retired in 1983. In Gulliver's last season, Wiltshire lost the Minor Counties Championship in the final match when they were beaten by Dorset and that enabled Oxfordshire to "pip them at the post".

Wiltshire has never won the MCCA Knockout Trophy since its inception in 1983. The team was the beaten finalist in 1993, losing to Staffordshire by 69 runs; and in 2005, losing to Norfolk by 6 wickets. Wiltshire has reached the semi-finals on four other occasions.

Wiltshire has played numerous matches against first-class opponents, including touring teams, but none of these matches have themselves been classified as first-class. The team has played in several List A matches since 1964, all of them in the various incarnations of the ECB's limited overs knockout tournament. Wiltshire's best performance in these matches was a victory over Scotland by 7 wickets in 2000, but Wiltshire has never beaten a first-class team.

== Notable players ==
The following Wiltshire cricketers also played with distinction in first-class cricket:

- Audley Miller – MCC and England (1895 to 1903)
- Bev Lyon – Gloucestershire (1921 to 1948)
- Jim Smith – Middlesex and England (1934 to 1939)
- John Thompson – Warwickshire (1938 to 1954)
- Anthony Marshall – Kent (1950 to 1954)
- Ian Lomax – Somerset and MCC (1962 to 1965)
- Andy Caddick – New Zealand under-19s, Somerset and England (1991 to 2009)
- Jon Lewis – Gloucestershire and England (from 1995)
- James Tomlinson – Hampshire (from 2002)
- Liam Dawson – Hampshire and England (from 2007)
- Wesley Durston - Derbyshire (from 2010)
- Craig Miles – Gloucestershire (from 2011)
- Michael Bates – ex-Hampshire (2015 and 2016)
- Jake Goodwin – Hampshire (2017)

== See also ==
- List of Wiltshire County Cricket Club grounds
- List of Wiltshire County Cricket Club List A players

== Bibliography ==
- Rowland Bowen, Cricket: A History of its Growth and Development, Eyre & Spottiswoode, 1970
- Barclays World of Cricket, (ed. E W Swanton), Willow Books, 1986
- John Major, More Than A Game, HarperCollins, 2007
- Playfair Cricket Annual – various editions
- Wisden Cricketers' Almanack – various editions
