= Lillian Bonsignore =

New York City Fire Commissioner since 2026 (born 1968 or 1969)

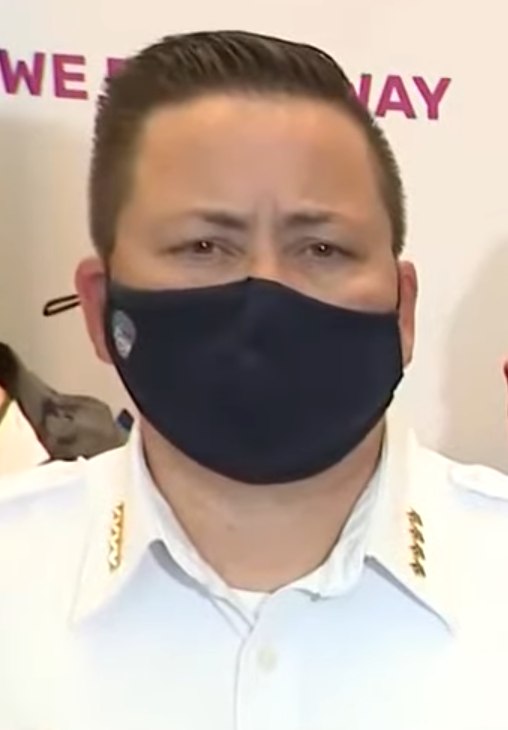
- Bonsignore in 2022

37th New York City Fire Commissioner
- Incumbent
- Assumed office January 6, 2026
- Mayor: Zohran Mamdani
- Preceded by: Mark Guerra

Chief of EMS Operations at FDNY
- In office May 7, 2019 – December 30, 2022
- Commissioner: Daniel A. Nigro; Laura Kavanagh
- Preceded by: James P. Booth
- Succeeded by: Michael Fields

Personal details
- Born: 1968 or 1969 (age 56–57) New York City, U.S.
- Spouse: Kim
- Children: 2
- Service career
- Branch: Fire Department of City of New York
- Service years: 1991–2022; 2026–present
- Rank: Chief of EMS Operations (2019–2022); Commissioner (2026–present)
- Unit: FDNY Bureau of EMS

Lillian Bonsignore (/ˈbɒnsɪnjɔːr/ BON-sin-yor; born 1968 or 1969) is an American emergency medical services administrator serving as New York City Fire Commissioner since 2026. A 31-year veteran of the department, she was the chief of Emergency Medical Services (EMS) from 2019 to 2022. Bonsignore is the first openly gay person and the first uniformed woman to serve as FDNY commissioner.

== Early life and education ==
Bonsignore was born in 1968 or 1969 and raised in the Bronx. She was a single mother when she began her career in emergency medical services in 1991.

== Career ==
Bonsignore joined the NYC Emergency Medicals Services (NYC-EMS) under NYC Health + Hospitals as an Emergency Medical Technician (EMT) in 1991. During the September 11 attacks, she served as a first responder, deploying from Fort Totten in Queens to the World Trade Center.

Bonsignore rose through the ranks of the EMS division. She was promoted to lieutenant in 2002, captain in 2005, and deputy chief in 2009. In 2016, she was appointed chief of the EMS Academy at Fort Totten. She served as deputy assistant chief, a role in which she managed EMS training and oversaw the certification of more than 13,000 EMTs.

In May 2019, Bonsignore was named chief of the FDNY's Emergency Medical Services division. She became the first woman to head the division and the first uniformed woman to achieve the rank of four-star chief within the department. She was appointed to this role shortly before the onset of the COVID-19 pandemic in New York City. Bonsignore retired from the FDNY in December 2022 after 31 years of service.

=== FDNY Commissioner ===
In December 2025, New York City mayor-elect Zohran Mamdani announced Bonsignore as his choice for FDNY Commissioner, with her term set to begin following his inauguration on January 1, 2026. She is the second woman to lead the FDNY and the first uniformed woman to hold the position. She is the first openly gay person to be named to the post. The announcement took place at a press conference in Queens.

The unions representing firefighters, fire officers, and medics expressed support for her appointment. Some commentators stated that her selection signaled a commitment to addressing pay parity for EMTs. The appointment also drew criticism on social media from Elon Musk, who wrote that ‘people will die’ as a result of the decision.

Following Mamdani's announcement, outgoing mayor Eric Adams appointed interim commissioner Mark Guerra to serve as commissioner for the final eight days of his term, prior to Bonsignore taking office. Bonsignore was sworn in as commissioner by Mayor Mamdani on January 6, 2026.

== Personal life ==
Bonsignore is lesbian. She has two children and is married to her wife Kim. Regarding her status as a trailblazer, she has remarked that being a woman and being gay are the "two things I put the least work into."

Fire appointments
Preceded by Mark Guerra	New York City Fire Commissioner; 2026–present	Incumbent
Preceded by James P. Booth	Chief of EMS Operations at FDNY; 2019–2022	Succeeded by Michael Fields
