= James E. Leonard =

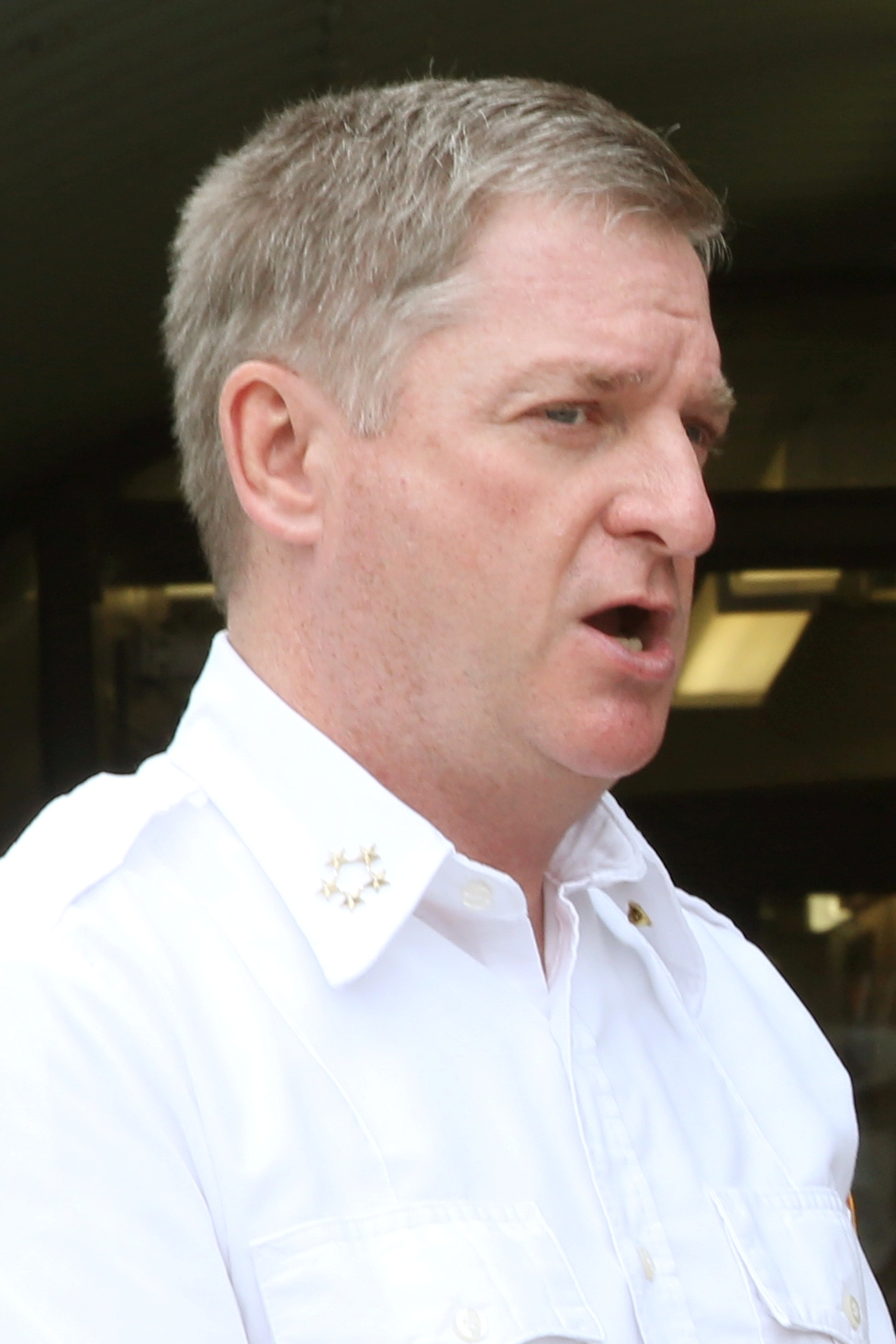

FDNY Chief of Department
- In office November 1, 2014 – December 6, 2018
- Commissioner: Daniel A. Nigro
- Preceded by: Edward Kilduff
- Succeeded by: John Sudnik

Personal details
- Born: Brooklyn, NY
- Spouse: Patricia Leonard
- Education: St. Francis College, John Jay College of Criminal Justice

James E. Leonard is a former fire Chief of Department who was relieved of duty for alleged misconduct from the New York City Fire Department (FDNY).

Leonard was the 35th Chief of department in the 150-year history of the New York City Fire Department. The Fire Chief is the most senior uniformed member of the fire department. Chief Leonard was relieved of duty for alleged misconduct on December 6, 2018. He officially retired on February 15, 2019.

Born in Brooklyn as a third-generation Irish American, Leonard grew up in Flatbush and received a Roman Catholic school system education. Leonard also attended a Franciscan college, earning an associate degree in Criminal Justice and a bachelor's degree in Sociology from St. Francis College in 1983. Leonard also holds a Master of Science degree in Fire Protection Management from John Jay College of Criminal Justice.

Leonard lives in Staten Island, and has a son, Thomas J. Leonard, who is a firefighter at Ladder 77 with the FDNY.

== Career ==
Leonard was the first member of his family to be a member of the FDNY, beginning his career in 1979 in Flatbush, Brooklyn first with Engine 310, then Ladder 174. After spending a year on the "Red Cap" arson street patrol in East New York, Leonard joined Ladder 85 in Staten Island in 1987. Leonard quickly promoted to lieutenant two years later and was assigned to Ladder 168 in Brooklyn. Eventually, he promoted to Battalion Chief in 1996, and soon after became Deputy Chief in 2002. Before becoming Fire Chief, Leonard was appointed Deputy Assistant Chief in 2010 and served as Brooklyn Borough Commander.

=== Misconduct and inappropriate behavior ===
Leonard was known as "Jekyll and Hyde" for his "abrasive and aggressive" conduct and a "tendency to shout at and berate others". That conduct would also turn into "bullying and screaming" towards subordinates and co-workers. Leonard also displayed a consistent pattern of sexism and misogyny, including use of misogynistic slurs and a notable instance of hostility towards a popular FDNY chaplain - a lesbian woman, right after the 2015 Gay Pride Parade.

Leonard's behavior made for a dysfunctional working environment, and his prejudice would ultimately lead to the discrimination of his civilian counterpart in the department, First Deputy Commissioner Laura Kavanagh. As the highest-ranking member of the uniformed branch of the department, Leonard ordered top-level chiefs to not interact with the administrative branch - to not speak with Kavanagh or her subordinates. Uniformed officers had to find ways to work surreptitiously with non-uniformed administrators.

Leonard was relieved from his duties in December 2018, following misconduct charges. He officially retired from the department on February 15, 2019.
