= John Sudnik =

FDNY Chief of Department
- In office February 27, 2019 – February 24, 2021
- Commissioner: Daniel A. Nigro
- Preceded by: James E. Leonard
- Succeeded by: Thomas J. Richardson

Personal details
- Born: 1962 (age 63–64) Brooklyn, NY
- Education: St. Francis College, John Jay College of Criminal Justice

John A. Sudnik is an American firefighter with the FDNY who was promoted to acting Chief of Department, the most senior uniformed member of the Department, on December 10, 2018. Prior to replacing his predecessor, James E. Leonard, Sudnik had been Chief of Operations. Sudnik's acting appointment was made permanent on February 27, 2019.

On October 22, 2019, when Sudnik participated in the kickoff of the 37th instance of a large annual food drive, he explained why firehouses were being used as collection points - firefighter's mission was to save lives.
