= New York City Fire Commissioner =

Civilian administrator of the NYC Fire Department

Fire Commissioner of the City of New York
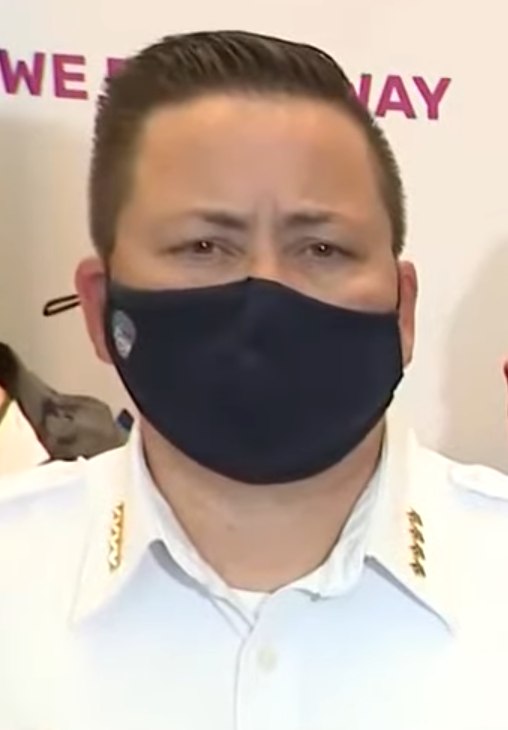
- Incumbent; Lillian Bonsignore since January 6, 2026
- Appointer: Mayor of New York
- Term length: Not specified; Renewable at mayor's pleasure
- Formation: 1865
- Salary: $277,605 (as of 2024)

The New York City fire commissioner is the civilian administrator of the New York City Fire Department (FDNY), and is appointed by the mayor of the City of New York. Prior to 1865, the New York City Fire Department was staffed by volunteers. On March 30, 1865 the New York State legislature passed a law organizing the Metropolitan Fire Department as a paid firefighting force that took control of all the powers and authority of the volunteer department, as well as all the assets such as the fire trucks, equipment, and buildings. The law also created a commission to oversee the department, and for its administration and functioning. After a lawsuit contesting the constitutionality of the law was dismissed by the New York Court of Appeals, it immediately started to operate.

During the remainder of the 19th century, the number of commissioners was periodically changed by the New York State legislature, until a single commissioner was put in charge of the FDNY when Manhattan and the Bronx consolidated with Brooklyn, Queens, and Staten Island to form The City of New York on January 1, 1898. Since then, there have been 37 commissioners (41 including acting commissioners). The current commissioner is Lillian Bonsignore, who was appointed by Zohran Mamdani at the beginning of his mayoral administration.

== List of fire commissioners ==
=== Pre-consolidated City of New York ===
During this period, the commissioners elected their own president who ran the commission meetings, and treasurer, who was the fiscal officer and responsible for reporting the department's finances to the mayor and the Board of Aldermen.

Date	Commissioners					
As a commission of four, nominated by the Governor, by and with the consent of the State Senate
May 3, 1865	Charles C. Pinckney		James W. Booth	Philip W. Engs		Martin B. Brown
May 4, 1865	elected president			elected treasurer		
August 30, 1865			resigned, position vacant			
September 1, 1865			Joshua G. Abbe			
March 30, 1867						resigned, position vacant
As a commission of five, nominated by the Governor, by and with the consent of the State Senate
May 1, 1867	Alexander Shaler elected president	Joshua G. Abbe elected treasurer	Theodorus Bailey Myers		James Galway	Monmouth B. Wilson
September 21, 1868		died, position vacant				
September 26, 1868					elected treasurer	
November 18, 1868		James M. McLean				
As a commission of five, nominated by the Mayor, with the consent of the City Aldermen
late April 1870	Alexander Shaler	William Hitchman	James S. Hennessy		James Galway	John J. Blair
April 30, 1870		elected president	elected treasurer			
As a commission of three, nominated by the Mayor, with the consent of the City Aldermen
May 16, 1873	Joseph L. Perley		Roswell D. Hatch			Cornelius Van Cott
May 19, 1873	elected president		elected treasurer			
May 1, 1875						term ended Vincent C. King
May 1, 1877			term ended			
May 3, 1877			John J. Gorman			
May 5, 1877			elected treasurer			elected president
May 1, 1879	term ended, position vacant					
May 20, 1879	Van Cott (second non-consec. term)					
May 1, 1881						term ended, position vacant
May 9, 1881	elected president					
August 10, 1881	elected treasurer		elected president			
September 14, 1881						Henry D. Purroy
May 10, 1883	elected president					elected treasurer
November 16, 1883			resigned Richard Croker			
May 1, 1885	term ended					
May 9, 1885	remaining term taken by Purroy elected president		elected treasurer			resigned to take Van Cott’s remaining term Elward Smith
May 9, 1887			resigned to take Smith's remaining term position vacant			term ended Croker (second term)
May 10, 1888			Fitz John Porter			
April 9, 1889						resigned to become City Chamberlain position vacant
May 2, 1889	resigned to take Porter's remaining term Anthony Eickhoff elected treasurer		Purroy (second term)			S. Howland Robbins
May 29, 1891	Eickhoff (reappointed to second term)					
January 1, 1893			resigned to become New York County Clerk position vacant			
January 10, 1893			John J. Scannell			elected president
May 1, 1893			reapppointed/moved to an empty full term Henry Winthrop Gray			term ended Scannell (full term)
May 2, 1893			elected treasurer			elected president
February 2, 1894			resigned replaced by S. Howland Robbins			
March 5, 1895						resigned/removed replaced by Oscar H. La Grange elected president
March 7, 1895	resigned/removed James R. Sheffield					
May 1, 1895			term ended Austin E. Ford			
June 30, 1896			elected treasurer			
September 17, 1896			died, position vacant			
September 26, 1896			Thomas Sturgis			
September 28, 1896	elected president		elected treasurer			
January 1, 1898	replaced by Scannell as a single commissioner (see next table)					

=== City of New York ===
Number	Name	Dates in Office	Administration	Notes and References	Deputy
1	John J. Scannell	January 1, 1898 – December 31, 1901	Robert Anderson Van Wyck	His salary was $5,000 per year (approximately $179,000 today)	James H. Tully
2	Thomas Sturgis	January 1, 1902 – December 31, 1903	Seth Low	Previously served as a pre-consolidation fire commissioner.	Richard H. Laimbeer
3	Nicholas J. Hayes	January 1, 1904 – December 31, 1905	George B. McClellan Jr.		William A. Doyle
4	John H. O'Brien	January 1, 1906 – October 10, 1906	George B. McClellan Jr.	Resigned before completing his term.	
5	Francis J. Lantry	October 10, 1906 – February 10, 1908	George B. McClellan Jr.	Resigned before completing his term.	
6	Hugh Bonner	February 10, 1908 – March 13, 1908	George B. McClellan Jr.	Died before completing his term.	
—	Nicholas J. Hayes	March 13, 1908 – January 3, 1910	George B. McClellan Jr.	This was his second non-consecutive term.	Charles C. Wise
7	Rhinelander Waldo	January 3, 1910 – May 23, 1911	William Jay Gaynor	Resigned less than two months after the Triangle Shirtwaist Factory fire to become the 8th New York City Police Commissioner. He was also Chief of the Aqueduct Police (now the New York City Department of Environmental Protection Police).	Arthur J. O'Keeffe
8	Joseph Johnson	May 23, 1911 – June 1, 1911 (acting); June 1, 1911 – December 31, 1913	William Jay Gaynor, Ardolph L. Kline	Acting New York City Fire Commissioner, then promoted to New York City Fire Commissioner.	Philip J. Farley
9	Robert Edward Adamson	January 1, 1914 – December 31, 1917	John Purroy Mitchel		Richard H. Laimbeer
10	Thomas J. Drennan	January 1, 1918 – April 30, 1926	John Francis Hylan, Jimmy Walker	Resigned before completing his term.	
11	John J. Dorman	May 5, 1926 – December 31, 1933	Jimmy Walker, Joseph V. McKee, John P. O'Brien		
—	Francis S. Giacome	January 1, 1934 – January 18, 1934 (acting)	Fiorello H. La Guardia	Acting New York City Fire Commissioner.	
12	John J. McElligott	January 18, 1934 – February 23, 1940	Fiorello H. La Guardia	Resigned during a corruption scandal before completing his term.	
13	Elmer Mustard	February 23, 1940 – February 26, 1940 (acting)	Fiorello H. La Guardia	Acting New York City Fire Commissioner during a corruption scandal.	
—	John J. McElligott	February 26, 1940 – May 8, 1941	Fiorello H. La Guardia	Second non-consecutive term. Resigned during a corruption scandal before completing his term.	
14	Patrick Walsh	May 8, 1941 – December 31, 1945	Fiorello H. La Guardia		
15	Frank J. Quayle Jr.	January 1, 1946 – November 13, 1950	William O'Dwyer, Vincent R. Impellitteri	Resigned before completing his term.	
—	Nathan C. Horwitz	November 13, 1950 – December 27, 1950 (acting)	Vincent R. Impellitteri	Acting New York City Fire Commissioner.	
16	George P. Monaghan	December 27, 1950 – July 9, 1951	Vincent R. Impellitteri	Resigned to become New York City Police Commissioner.	
–	Nathan C. Horwitz	July 9, 1951 – August 2, 1951 (acting)	Vincent R. Impellitteri	This was his second non-consecutive term as Acting New York City Fire Commissioner.	
17	Jacob B. Grumet	August 2, 1951 – February 15, 1954	Vincent R. Impellitteri		
18	Edward Francis Cavanagh Jr.	February 15, 1954 – December 31, 1961	Robert F. Wagner Jr.		
19	Edward Thompson	January 1, 1962 – August 6, 1964	Robert F. Wagner Jr.	Resigned before completing his term.	
20	Martin Scott	August 6, 1964 – December 31, 1965	Robert F. Wagner Jr.		
21	Robert Oliver Lowery	January 1, 1966 – September 29, 1973	John Lindsay	First African-American New York City Fire Commissioner, resigned before completing his term.	
22	John T. O'Hagan	October 11, 1973 – January 17, 1978	John Lindsay, Abraham Beame		
23	Augustus A. Beekman	January 17, 1978 – November 5, 1980	Ed Koch	Second African-American New York City Fire Commissioner, resigned before completing his term because of illness preceding his death.	
24	Charles J. Hynes	November 5, 1980 – October 22, 1982	Ed Koch	Resigned before completing his term.	
25	Joseph E. Spinnato	October 22, 1982 – February 17, 1983 (interim); February 17, 1983 – November 16, 1987	Ed Koch	Resigned before completing his term.	
26	Joseph F. Bruno	November 16, 1987 – December 31, 1989	Ed Koch		
27	Carlos M. Rivera	January 1, 1990 – August 31, 1993	David Dinkins	Resigned before completing his term.	
28	William M. Feehan	August 31, 1993 – November 24, 1993 (acting); November 24, 1993 – December 31, 1993	David Dinkins	Acting New York City Fire Commissioner, then promoted to New York City Fire Commissioner. Died in the September 11 attacks.	
29	Howard Safir	January 1, 1994 – April 15, 1996	Rudy Giuliani	Resigned to become the 39th New York City Police Commissioner.	
30	Thomas Von Essen	April 15, 1996 – December 31, 2001	Rudy Giuliani		
31	Nicholas Scoppetta	January 1, 2002 – December 31, 2009	Michael Bloomberg		
32	Salvatore Cassano	January 1, 2010 – June 7, 2014	Michael Bloomberg, Bill de Blasio	Replaced by Bill De Blasio with Daniel A. Nigro	
33	Daniel A. Nigro	June 7, 2014 – February 16, 2022	Bill de Blasio, Eric Adams		
34	Laura Kavanagh	February 16, 2022 – October 27, 2022 (interim); October 27, 2022 – August 7, 2024	Eric Adams		
—	Joseph W. Pfeifer	August 7, 2024 – August 12, 2024 (acting)	Eric Adams		
35	Robert Tucker	August 12, 2024 – December 19, 2025	Eric Adams	Following Zohran Mamdani's victory in the mayoral race, on November 5, 2025 Tucker announced his resignation, effective December 19.	
36	Mark Guerra	December 19, 2025 – December 23, 2025 (acting); December 23, 2025 – January 6, 2026	Eric Adams		
37	Lillian Bonsignore	January 6, 2026 – present	Zohran Mamdani		
