= George P. Monaghan =

American lawyer

16th New York City Fire Commissioner
- In office December 6, 1950 – July 18, 1951
- Appointed by: Vincent Richard Impellitteri
- Preceded by: Frank J. Quayle
- Succeeded by: Jacob Grumet

8th New York City Police Commissioner
- In office 1951–1953
- Appointed by: Vincent Richard Impellitteri
- Preceded by: Thomas Francis Murphy
- Succeeded by: Francis William Holbrooke Adams

Harness-Racing Commissioner
- In office 1953–1954

Personal details
- Born: June 10, 1901 Canandaigua, New York, U.S.
- Died: September 6, 1986 (aged 85) The Bronx, New York, U.S.

George Patrick Monaghan (June 10, 1901 – September 6, 1986) was an American lawyer, fire commissioner and police commissioner.

== Biography ==
He was an assistant district attorney in Manhattan. Among the cases in which he appeared for the prosecution was the trial of John M. Dunn for the murder of Andy Hintz. He was appointed the 16th Fire Commissioner of the City of New York by Mayor Vincent Richard Impellitteri on December 6, 1950 and served in that position until July 18, 1951 when he resigned to accept an appointment as New York City Police Commissioner to replace Thomas Francis Murphy. In 1953 he was appointed sole Harness-Racing Commissioner when Governor Dewey abolished the earlier three-man Harness-Racing Commission.

Fire appointments
Preceded by Frank J. Quayle	FDNY Commissioner; 1950–1951	Succeeded by Jacob B. Grumet
Police appointments
Preceded by Thomas Francis Murphy	NYPD Commissioner; 1951–1953	Succeeded by Francis W. H. Adams
