= Joseph Pfeifer =

Joseph Pfeifer may refer to:

- Joseph L. Pfeifer, American physician and politician, member of the United States House of Representatives
- Joseph W. Pfeifer, American firefighter, survivor and first responder during the September 11 attacks
