= Commissioner Johnson =

- Johnson Roussety, Chief Commissioner of Rodrigues
- Joseph Johnson, Jr., New York City Fire Commissioner
- Roger Johnson (North Dakota), North Dakota Agriculture Commissioner
