= 1950 New York City special mayoral election =

- November 7, 1950
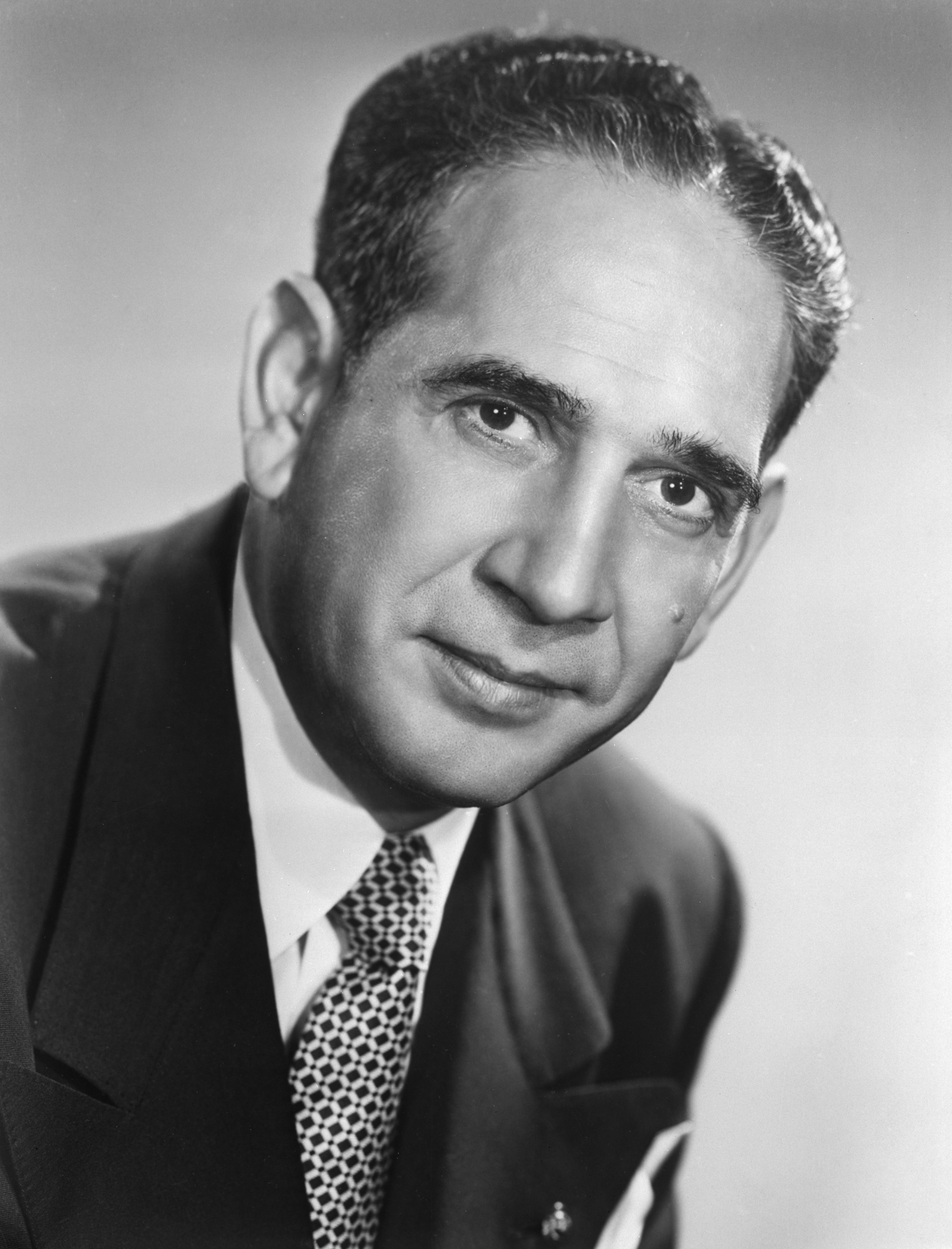

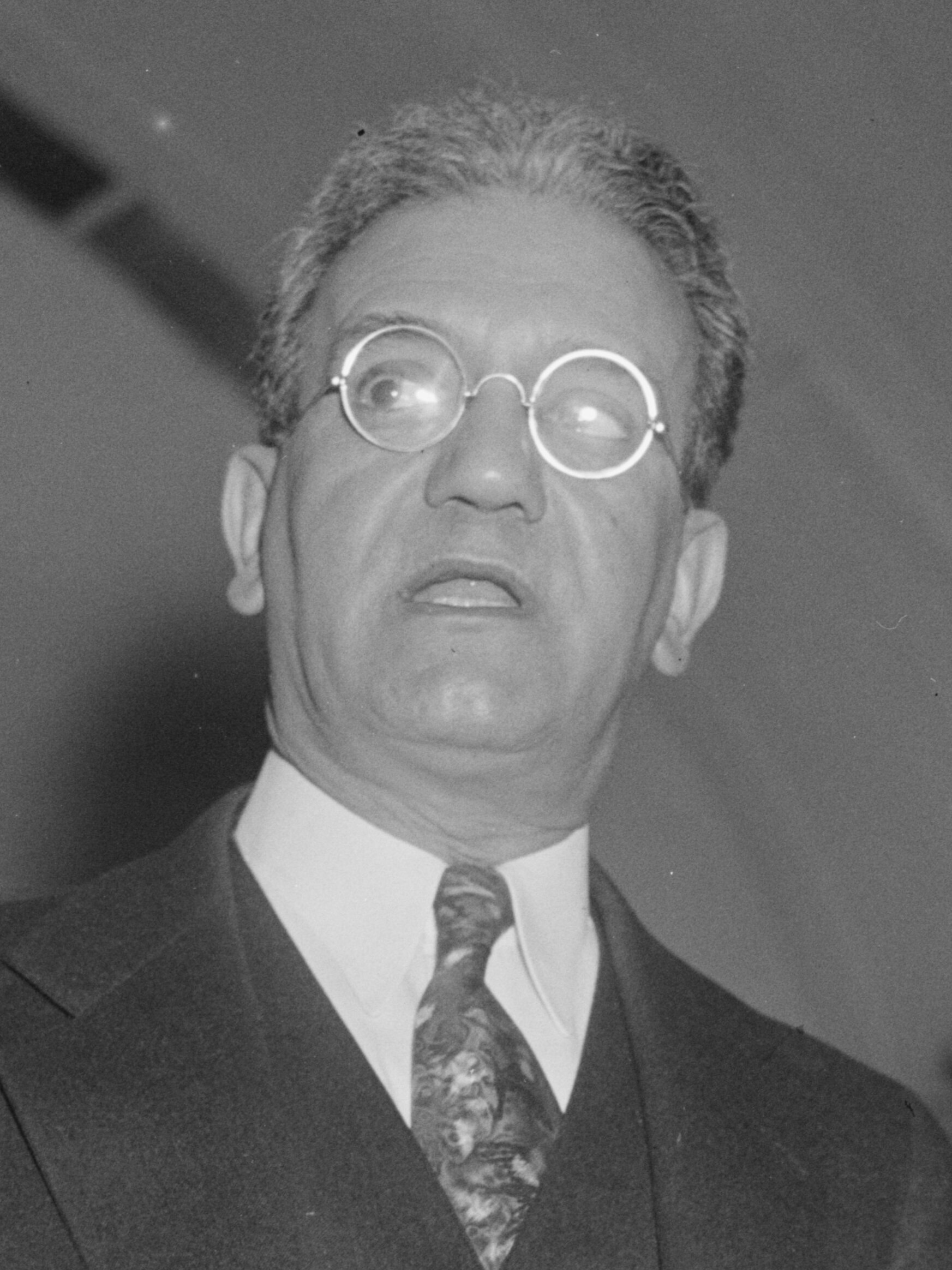

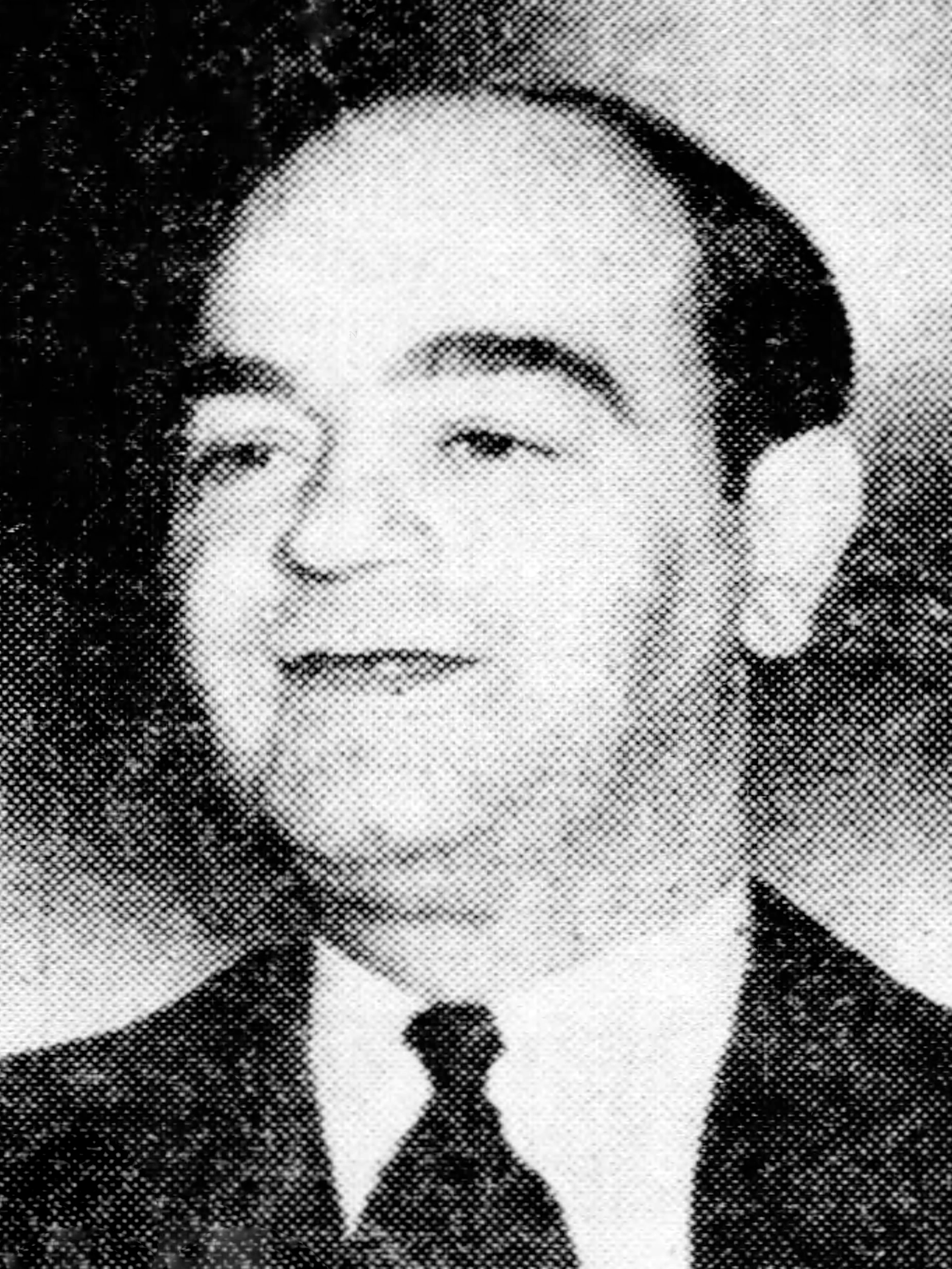

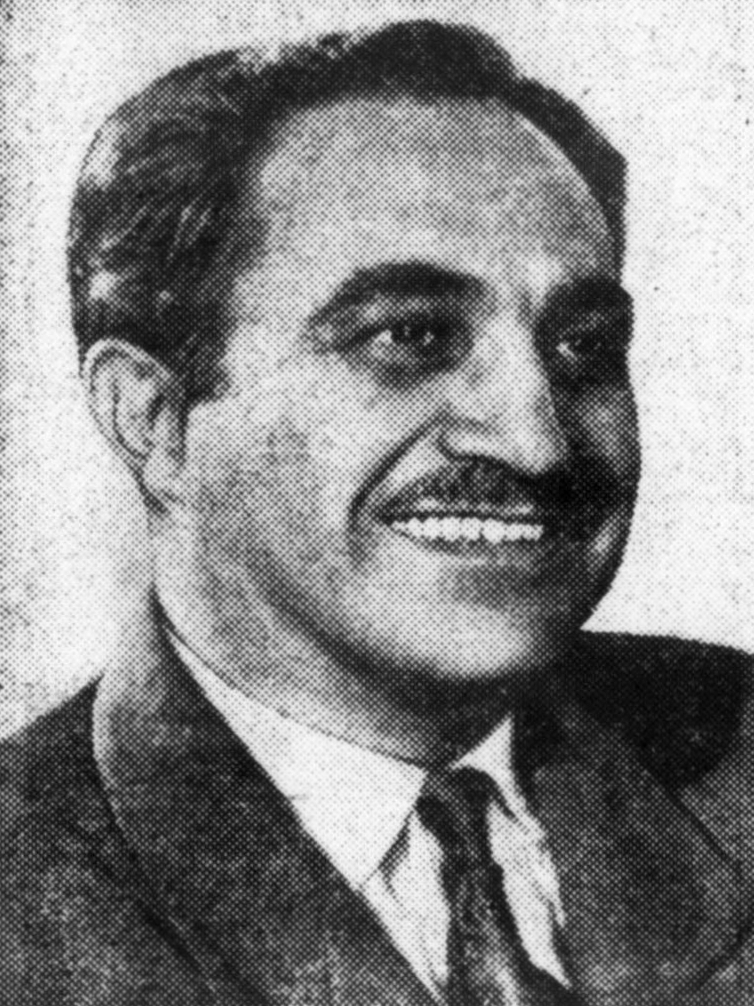
Candidate	Vincent R. Impellitteri	Ferdinand Pecora
Party	Experience	Democratic
Alliance		Liberal
Popular vote	1,161,175	935,069
Percentage	44.21%	35.61%
Candidate	Edward F. Corsi	Paul Ross
Party	Republican	American Labor
Popular vote	382,372	147,578
Percentage	14.56%	5.62%
- Borough results Pecora: 40–50% Impellitteri: 40–50% 50–60%
Mayor before election
Vincent R. Impellitteri
Democratic
Elected mayor
Vincent R. Impellitteri
Experience

The 1950 New York City special mayoral election was held on November 7, 1950. Incumbent Democratic Mayor William O'Dwyer had resigned as mayor of New York City in August 1950 to become the United States Ambassador to Mexico. As a result, fellow Democrat Vincent R. Impellitteri became acting mayor in August, having to run in the special election in November to serve out the remaining three years of O'Dwyer's term. Ultimately, Impellitteri was not nominated by New York City Democrats in this election. However, Impellitteri won the election as a third-party candidate.

This election was notable because all major mayoral candidates were Italian-Americans: Impellitteri, Pecora, and Corsi all had Italian heritage. This is also one of two mayoral elections where the winning candidate was not on the Democratic or Republican ballot line, the other being the 1969 election.

== Background ==
Mayor William O'Dwyer was first elected in 1945 and re-elected in 1949, both times with the support of the Tammany Hall political machine. Following his 1949 campaign, O'Dwyer was seen as the likely Democratic nominee for the upcoming gubernatorial election in New York in 1950. However, a fast-moving scandal had surfaced connecting the New York Police Department to a gambling ring that included many of the city's top political figures. Within weeks, the scandal began to attract national attention, notably from the anti-crime committee of Tennessee Senator Estes Kefauver. President Harry Truman then offered O'Dwyer the ambassadorship to Mexico before the scandal escalated further and possibly implicated O'Dwyer.

Due to O'Dwyer's unexpected resignation, New York City Council President Vincent R. Impellitteri was appointed as mayor of New York City following after O'Dwyer left office in August 1950. Impellitteri had been an ally of O'Dwyer and the Tammany Hall Democratic political machine through that time, with O'Dwyer personally selecting him as New York City Council President. Historian Robert Caro alleges that the unassuming Impellitteri was a virtually unknown civil servant who started his career in politics because he had "a name that even the dumbest voter [would] be able to tell was Italian," as Italians were a critical voting bloc in New York City at the time. However, within a month of his appointment as mayor, Impellitteri had replaced the incumbent New York City Police Commissioner with Assistant U.S. Attorney Thomas Francis Murphy, who garnered significant support for his anti-corruption efforts against the New York City Police Department.

== Nominations ==
=== Democratic ===
Despite losing a great deal of power under the administration of Republican mayor Fiorello La Guardia, Tammany Hall nevertheless remained a significant force in New York City's Democratic politics. By this point, Tammany had turned against Impellitteri, who they felt was undeserving of the Democratic nomination. Instead, the Democrats and Liberals nominated Ferdinand Pecora, a judge on the New York Supreme Court, former Securities and Exchange Commissioner, and longtime Tammany Hall member. Pecora was one of the candidates on the shortlist of Tammany boss Carmine DeSapio.

=== Republican ===
Edward Corsi won the Republican nomination.

=== Liberal ===
The Liberals considered giving their nomination to a Republican, especially if it was Jacob Javits. However, Thomas J. Curran opposed forming a coalition with the liberals.

=== American Labor ===
The American Labor Party nominated Paul Ross, the first chairman of the New York City Rent Commission. Corsi and Ross both received far less support than either Pecora or Impellitteri.

=== Experience ===
Impellitteri refused to concede the election following his loss of the Democratic nomination and instead ran as a member of the Experience Party, which Impellitteri created to run in this election. Impellitteri was a political unknown in the city at the time, but his aides quickly sought to introduce him to voters as a dedicated opponent of New York City's political corruption and as an ally of the popular Robert Moses. After Impellitteri promised him a free hand in setting New York City construction policy, Moses agreed to support the incumbent mayor's third-party campaign. Ultimately, the Experience Party was a "shoestring operation" with the task of taking on the dominant political machine of New York City. However, Impellitteri's anti-corruption message resonated with voters; he mustered volunteers, and won election to the remaining three years of O'Dwyer's term.

== General election ==
=== Candidates ===
- Edward F. Corsi (Republican)
- Vincent Impellitteri, acting mayor (Experience)
- Ferdinand Pecora, justice of the New York Supreme Court and former SEC commissioner (Democratic and Liberal)
- Paul Ross, chairman of the New York City Rent Commission (American Labor)

=== Endorsements ===
Corsi endorsements

Notable individuals

- Donald S. Harrington, reverend
- Marie La Guardia, wife of Fiorello La Guardia
Pecora endorsements

Organizations

- American Federation of Labor
- Americans for Democratic Action
- Citizens Union
- Congress of Industrial Organizations

Notable individuals

- Samuel Seabury, judge

=== Results ===
Mayor Impellitteri won the election by nine points over Pecora, winning the boroughs of Manhattan, Queens and Staten Island. Pecora won narrow pluralities in Brooklyn and The Bronx.

1950 New York City mayoral election
Party	Candidate	Votes	%	±%
Experience	Vincent Impellitteri	1,161,175	44.21%	N/A
Democratic	Ferdinand Pecora	711,358	27.08%	▼21.08
Liberal	Ferdinand Pecora	223,993	8.53%	▼5.92
Total	Ferdinand Pecora	935,069	35.61%	N/A
Republican	Edward Corsi	382,372	14.56%	▼7.60
American Labor	Paul Ross	147,578	5.62%	▼8.21
Total votes		2,626,476	100.00%	

==== By borough ====
1950	Party	Manhattan	The Bronx	Brooklyn	Queens	Richmond [Staten Is.]	Total	%
Vincent Impellitteri	Experience	246,608	215,913	357,322	303,448	37,884	1,161,175	44.2%
Vincent Impellitteri	Experience	40.4%	41.3%	40.5%	55.5%	60.0%	1,161,175	44.2%
Ferdinand Pecora	Democratic	166,240	157,537	271,670	104,734	11,177	711,358	27.1%
Ferdinand Pecora	Liberal	48,370	59,717	90,576	24,489	841	223,993	8.5%
Ferdinand Pecora	Total	214,610	217,254	362,246	129,223	12,018	935,351	35.6%
Ferdinand Pecora	Total	35.1%	41.6%	41.0%	23.6%	19.0%	935,351	35.6%
Edward Corsi	Republican	102,575	54,796	113,392	99,225	12,384	382,372	14.6%
Edward Corsi	Republican	16.8%	10.5%	12.8%	18.1%	19.6%	382,372	14.6%
Paul Ross	American Labor Party	47,201	34,575	49,999	14,904	899	147,578	5.6%
Total		610,994	522,538	882,959	546,800	63,185	2,626,476	

== Works cited ==
- Soyer, Daniel (2021). Left in the Center: The Liberal Party of New York and the Rise and Fall of American Social Democracy. Cornell University Press. ISBN 9781501759888. JSTOR 10.7591/j.ctv1hw3x50.2.
