= John J. McElligott =

New York City Fire Commissioner

John James McElligott (August 25, 1882 – September 6, 1946) was appointed the 12th New York City Fire Commissioner by Mayor Fiorello H. La Guardia on January 1, 1934.

== Biography ==
McElligott announced his retirement from his position on February 23, 1940. Mayor LaGuardia initially appointed Elmer Mustard as Fire Commissioner. However, the next day, Mayor LaGuardia declared McElligott's resignation "null and void," and on February 27, 1940, McElligott resumed his role as Fire Commissioner. He continued in this position until he was removed by LaGuardia due to a corruption scandal on May 8, 1941. McElligott died on September 6, 1946, at Saint Clare's Hospital in Manhattan. His funeral mass was held at Saint Patrick's Cathedral with Cardinal Francis Spellman in attendance.

Fire appointments
| Preceded by John J. Dorman | FDNY Commissioner; 1934–1940 | Succeeded by Elmer Mustard |
| Preceded by Elmer Mustard | FDNY Commissioner; 1940–1941 | Succeeded by Patrick Walsh |
