= Robert Adamson (FDNY Commissioner) =

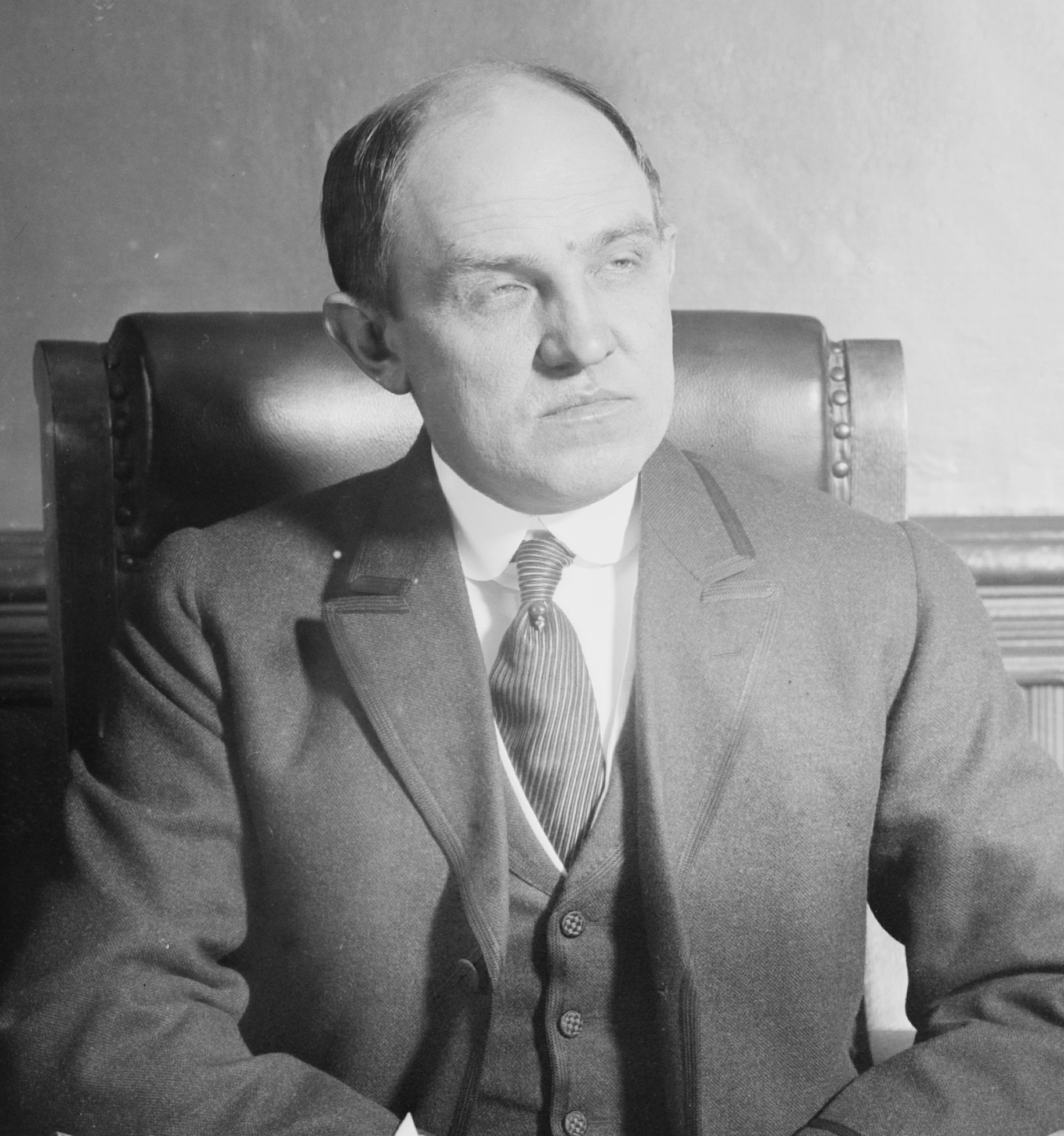
- Adamson in 1913

New York City Fire Commissioner
- In office 1914–1917
- Appointed by: John Purroy Mitchel
- Preceded by: Joseph Johnson
- Succeeded by: Thomas J. Drennan

Personal details
- Born: March 31, 1871 Clayton County, Georgia, U.S.
- Died: September 19, 1935 (aged 64) New York City, U.S.
- Spouse: Ethel McClintock

Robert Adamson (March 31, 1871 – September 19, 1935) was an American journalist, banker, and public official. As Fire Commissioner of the City of New York, he proposed a modern fire alarm system for the city.

== Biography ==
Adamson was born on March 31, 1871, in Clayton County, Georgia, to Augustus Pitt Adamson and Martilla Ellen Cook.

He began writing articles for the Macon, Georgia, newspaper while still in his teens. At age 20, he became city editor of the Atlanta Constitution. He later moved to New York City and worked as a reporter for The New York Sun, the New York World, and the Brooklyn Eagle.

He married Ethel McClintock on December 10, 1902, at Trinity Chapel in Manhattan.

In 1910, Adamson became secretary to New York Mayor William Jay Gaynor, and gained fame by helping thwart an assassination attempt on Gaynor. When Gaynor died in September 1910, Adamson continued as secretary to the new mayor, Ardolph Loges Kline. In 1914, he was campaign manager for John Purroy Mitchel.

In 1914 Mitchel appointed Adamson as the 9th Fire Commissioner of the City of New York. Adamson served in that position until the end of the Mitchel Administration on December 31, 1917. During his tenure he worked to have the entire department motorized. He also proposed a modern fire alarm system for the city.

Adamson unsuccessfully ran for the New York Board of Aldermen in 1917. He then left politics to work in banking and public relations.

He died of a heart attack in Manhattan, New York City, on September 19, 1935.

Fire appointments
Preceded by Joseph Johnson	FDNY Commissioner; 1914–1917	Succeeded by Thomas J. Drennan
