= Joseph W. Pfeifer =

American fire chief (born 1956)

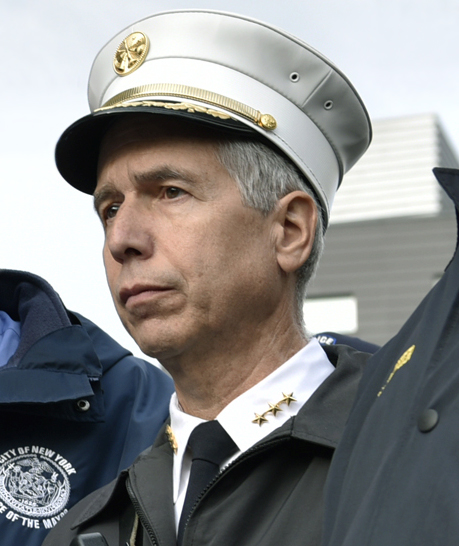
- Pfeifer in 2015, as assistant chief
- Born: 1956 (age 69–70); New York City, U.S.
- Education: Cathedral College of the Immaculate Conception (1974–1978); Harvard Kennedy School (M.P.A.); Naval Postgraduate School
- Notable work: Ordinary Heroes: A Memoir of 9/11 (2021)
- Awards: Knight of the Ordre national du Mérite

Joseph W. Pfeifer (born 1956) is a retired American firefighter who served with the New York City Fire Department (FDNY). Pfeifer served as First Deputy Commissioner of the FDNY from February 2023 until September 2024, and as Acting Fire Commissioner of the FDNY in August 2024. Prior to his civilian work in the FDNY, Pfeifer was an Assistant Chief. He retired in 2018.

Pfeifer was the first fire chief to respond to the World Trade Center during the September 11 attacks in 2001.

== Early life and education ==
Joseph W. Pfeifer was born and raised in Middle Village, Queens. During summers, he would go to Breezy Point, Queens where he began his community service originally as a lifeguard.

Pfeifer enrolled in the Cathedral College of the Immaculate Conception in 1974 with a major in psychology and a minor in philosophy, and graduated in 1978. He started his career as a firefighter in 1981, with his first assignment to Engine 234 in Crown Heights, Brooklyn, and promoted to Lieutenant in August 1987, then Battalion Chief in 1997.

Pfeifer holds a Master of Public Administration (M.P.A.) from Harvard Kennedy School, a Master in Security Studies from the Naval Postgraduate School, and a Master in Theology from Immaculate Conception.

== Career ==
=== September 11 attacks ===
On September 11, 2001, Pfeifer was Chief of Battalion 1 and therefore responsible for the southern tip of Manhattan, including the World Trade Center. He had celebrated his 20th anniversary with the FDNY six days earlier and was therefore eligible for retirement.

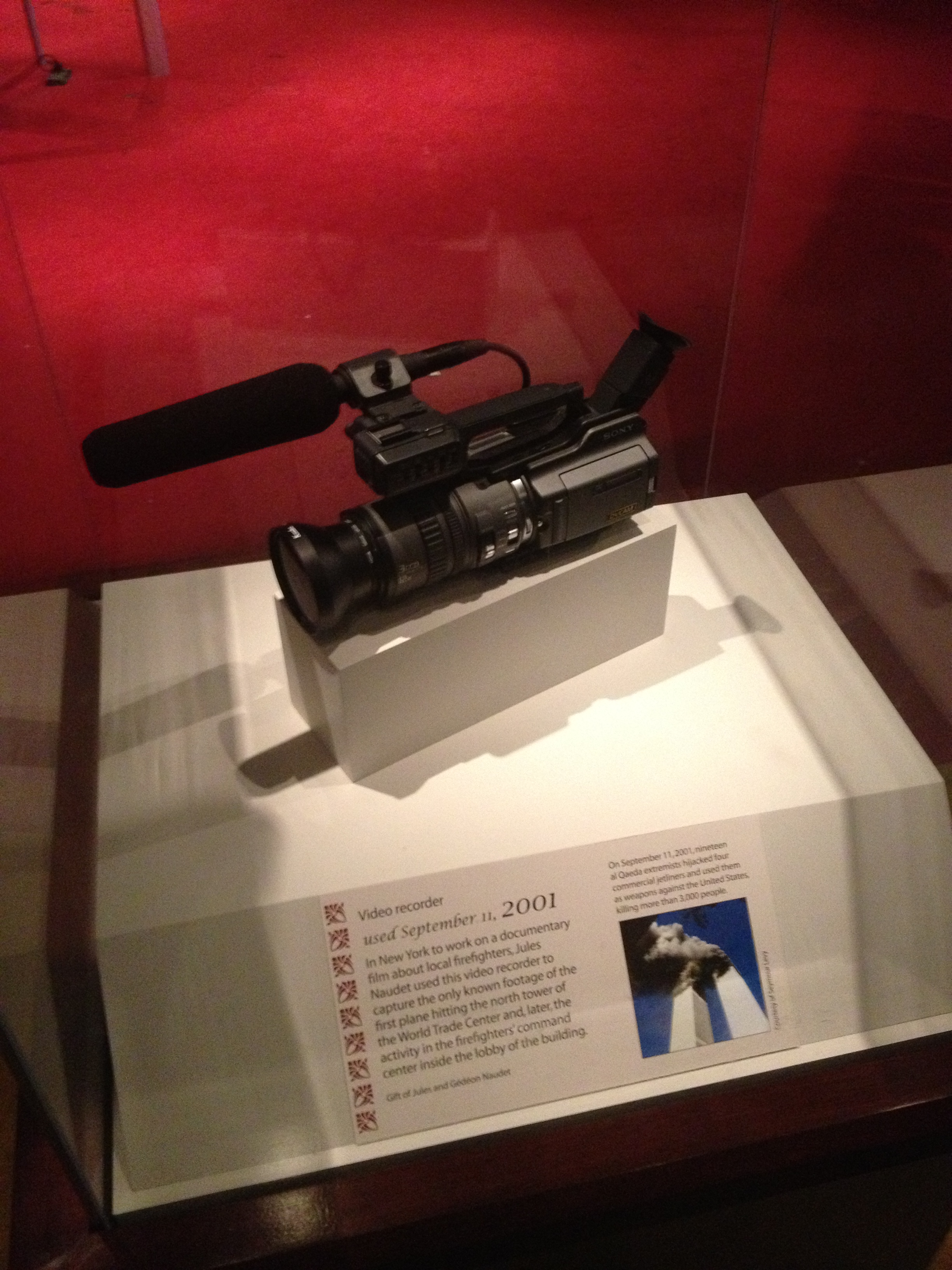
The camera that Jules Naudet used to film the impact of the first plane and the crisis that unfolded from Chief Pfeifer's point of view (on display at the 9/11 Memorial and Museum)

At 8:46 a.m., while Pfeifer led the response to reports of a possible gas leak at the intersection of Church Street and Lispenard Street, American Airlines Flight 11 flew over the firefighters' heads and struck the North Tower. Franco-American filmmaker Jules Naudet, who with his brother Gédéon had been filming a documentary about Pfeifer's firehouse, captured one of three known videos of the North Tower impact.

En route to the World Trade Center, Pfeifer radioed that he had identified the airliner as an "American Airlines plane" and observed it "aiming" for the North Tower. Arriving minutes later, he established an Incident Command Post in the lobby of the North Tower and coordinated the FDNY's response with other chiefs as they arrived on site. When Jules Naudet asked if he could stay, Pfeifer responded, "I want you right next to me. Never leave my side."

Although the South Tower had not yet been hit, Pfeifer ordered civilian evacuations of both towers out of an abundance of caution. He personally ordered hundreds of firefighters – including his brother Kevin, a lieutenant with Engine 33 – to ascend the stairs in the North Tower to rescue people trapped at and above the impact zone. That was the last time he ever saw his brother. He continued to manage the unprecedented crisis after the crash of United Airlines Flight 175 into the South Tower at 9:03 a.m. As people began jumping to escape the intense fire and smoke in the towers, Pfeifer tried in vain to ask them to wait to be rescued over the building's public address system.

When the South Tower collapsed at 9:59 a.m., causing an avalanche of dust and debris, without knowing the extent of the damage, he called for all firefighters to leave the North Tower and left the command post, escaping via a pedestrian bridge to the World Financial Center, bringing with him a number of survivors as well as the body of his friend and FDNY Chaplain, Father Mychal Judge. Although Pfeifer did not immediately comprehend that the South Tower had collapsed, he ordered all firefighters to evacuate the North Tower. At 10:28 a.m., he witnessed the collapse of the North Tower from across the street and covered Jules Naudet with his body to protect him from the flying concrete and steel.

Coated in dust, the battalion chief regrouped with Deputy Chief Peter Hayden to coordinate the first rescue efforts. Without the infrastructure to fight the fires that had started in 7 World Trade Center during the attacks, Pfeifer and the surviving firefighters could only watch as the other skyscraper burned out of control before collapsing at 5:20 p.m.

In recent years, Pfeifer has publicly discussed his experience on September 11 in detail, including in his 2021 book, Ordinary Heroes: A Memoir of 9/11, and in an interview for the 2021 National Geographic documentary series 9/11: One Day in America. His decision to allow the Naudet brothers to stay and film the crisis as it unfolded both confirmed his account of events and resulted in the only record of the World Trade Center attacks from start to finish.

=== After September 11 ===
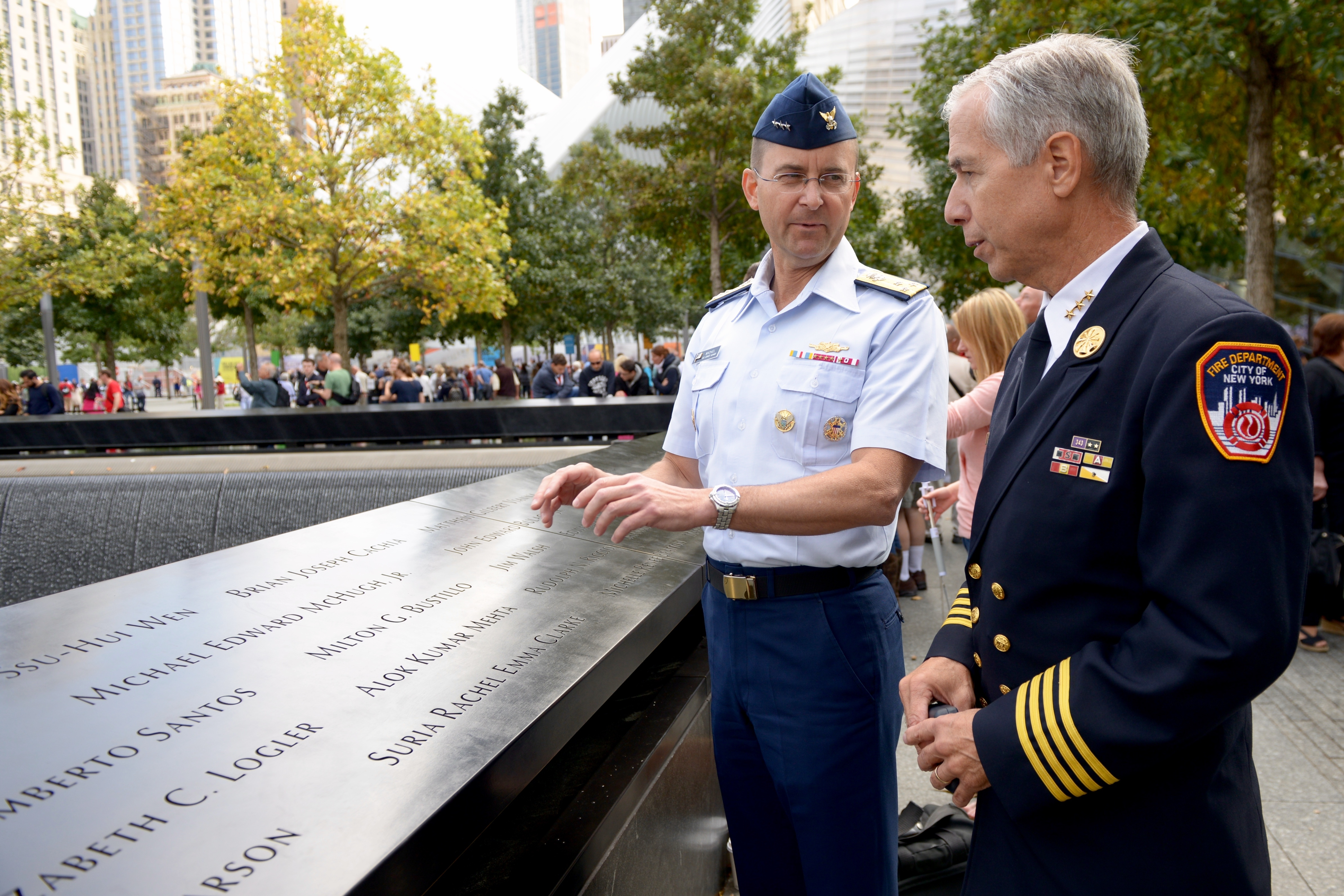
Pfeifer at the National September 11 Memorial and Museum, October 10, 2015.

After the September 11 attacks, Pfeifer left Battalion 1 and served as the Chief of Planning & Strategy of the FDNY Bureau of Operations. He also made it his effort to create the CTDP (Center for Terrorism and Disaster Preparedness), which was formally opened in 2004. On November 7, 2009, Pfeifer was promoted from Deputy Assistant Chief to Assistant Chief. During his tenure as the Chief of CTDP, Pfeifer played a vital role on the effects of Hurricane Sandy in New York in 2012, served as an Incident Commander at the Metro North commuter train derailment at Spuyten Duyvil in 2013, and assisted in developing the Ebola response in NYC in 2014.

On July 12, 2018, Pfeifer retired from FDNY after 37 years of service, making him the last fire chief on site of the September 11 attacks to leave the FDNY. On September 12, 2021, he was awarded Knight of the Ordre national du Mérite at the Consulate General of France, New York City by Philippe Étienne, Ambassador of France to the United States.

On February 18, 2023, FDNY Commissioner Laura Kavanagh appointed Pfeifer as First Deputy Commissioner – the second highest rank in the FDNY.

On July 26, 2023, Pfeifer provided remarks at a media press briefing regarding a fire and crane collapse in Manhattan.

On August 7, 2024, Pfeifer was appointed to acting Fire Commissioner after FDNY Commissioner Laura Kavanagh stepped down from her role. He served as Fire Commissioner until August 12, 2024, when Robert S. Tucker was appointed by Mayor Eric Adams.

In an ABC interview on September 9, 2024, Pfeifer announced he would be retiring again from the FDNY. Pfeifer stated his last day would be September 11, 2024. Pfeifer told ABC that he chose September 11 to be his last day because "that was the day I worked the hardest". Pfeifer told ABC he plans to write another book and teach at Columbia University.

== FDNY ranks ==
- FDNY First Deputy Fire Commissioner – (February 2023 – September 2024)
- FDNY Assistant Chief of Department – (November 2009 – July 2018)
  - Chief of Counterterrorism and Emergency Preparedness
- FDNY Deputy Assistant Chief – (Unknown – November 2009)
  - Chief of Counterterrorism and Emergency Preparedness
  - Chief of Operations for Planning and Strategy
- FDNY Deputy Fire Chief – (2002)
- FDNY Battalion Chief – (1997)
  - Battalion 1. (September 2001)
- FDNY Fire Captain – (1993)
- FDNY Lieutenant – (1987)
- FDNY Firefighter – (1981)

== Personal life ==
Pfeifer married his wife Ginny on June 3, 1984. They have two children. Pfeifer's brother, Kevin J. Pfeifer, was also a FDNY firefighter, who died at the North Tower on the day of September 11, and had once reached the 32nd floor with Engine 33. Kevin was last seen by survivor FDNY Captain Dennis Tardio on the 9th floor of the North Tower, helping people evacuate.

Fire appointments
Preceded by Laura Kavanagh	Acting New York City Fire Commissioner; August 7, 2024 – August 12, 2024	Succeeded by Robert S. Tucker
