= John J. Dorman =

John Jay Dorman (1870-1953) was appointed the 11th Fire Commissioner of the City of New York by Mayor James J. Walker on May 5, 1926, and resigned his position on December 31, 1933. He was also the chairman of the Kings County Democratic Committee.

== Biography ==
He was the Clerk of the Court of Special Sessions in Kings County starting in 1920 and he was Chairman of the Democratic County Committee of Brooklyn. He was appointed the 11th New York City Fire Commissioner by Mayor James J. Walker on May 5, 1926.

During his first month in office, he faced calls for removal from the Jewish Veterans of the Wars of the Republic over an ethnic joke he made during a Fire Department Holy Name Society communion breakfast at the Hotel Astor that was broadcast on WNYC. In 1928, "Dorman Square" in Midwood, Brooklyn was named after him, causing controversy as this honor was usually not accorded to living people.

He resigned his position on December 31, 1933, and subsequently worked in banking. He died on June 21, 1953.

Fire appointments
Preceded by Thomas J. Drennan	FDNY Commissioner; 1926–1933	Succeeded by John J. McElligott
