= Thomas Sturgis =

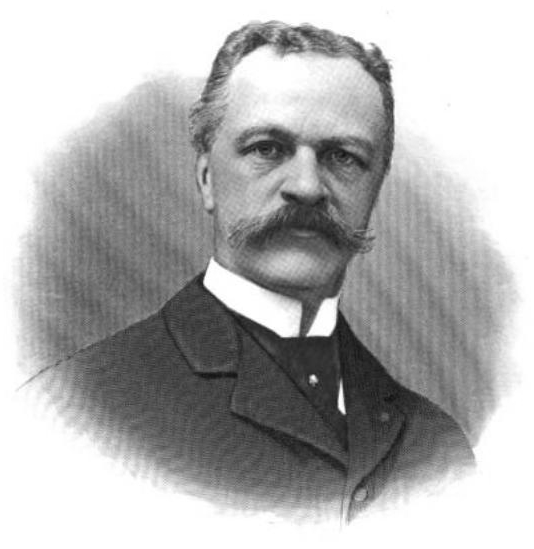

2nd Fire Commissioner of the City of New York
- In office 1902–1903
- Appointed by: Seth Low
- Preceded by: John J. Scannell
- Succeeded by: Nicholas J. Hayes

Member of the Wyoming Territorial Senate
- In office 1882-1883

Personal details
- Born: April 6, 1846 Manhattan, New York, U.S.
- Died: February 25, 1914 (aged 67) Eastbourne, England
- Party: Republican

Military service
- Allegiance: United States Union
- Years of service: 1861–1865
- Rank: First Lieutenant
- Battles/wars: Civil War

Thomas Sturgis (April 6 or 30, 1846 – February 25, 1914) was a businessman, soldier, financier and politician. He was appointed the second New York City Fire Commissioner by Mayor Seth Low on January 1, 1902, and served in that position until the end of the Low Administration on December 31, 1903. Prior to this he served as a fire commissioner under William Lafayette Strong, replacing Austin E. Ford. Sturgis was also developer of Cheyenne, Wyoming, and financier. In the Pacific Historical Review, Gene M. Gressley wrote that Sturgis was "one of the few young easterners who came west in search of a fortune and stayed long enough to become one of the most respected men in the cattle industry."

== Early life and education ==
Thomas Sturgis was born on April 6 or 30, 1846, to Wiliam and Elizabeth Sturgis, in New York City. He attended New York City public schools, including Grammar School No. 40. When he was 16, Sturgis began working as a clerk at a wholesale dry goods house.

== Military service ==
Upon the outbreak of the American Civil War, Sturgis joined the twenty-second regiment of the New York State Militia. When he turned 18 in 1864, Sturgis enlisted in the Sixtieth Massachusetts Regiment, commissioned as a first lieutenant and adjutant of the Sixtieth regiment. Sturgis served as post-adjutant of a prisoner-of-war camp near Camp Morton in Indiana in the summer and fall of 1864. After the Sixtieth was mustered out, he was commissioned as a first lieutenant in the Fifty-seventh, serving in various capacities as an aide-de-camp and an assistant adjutant general at the army camp, rising to be assistant adjutant general of the First Division of the Ninth Army Corps, attached to the Army of the Potomac. At the Battle of Fort Stedman (March 25, 1865), Sturgis was taken prisoner, held in Libby Prison, and exchanged, serving until the end of the war in 1865.

== Career ==
After the conclusion of the war, Sturgis briefly studied law, before moving to west to Neosho in Southwest Missouri in spring 1868. He managed several farms, and worked as a general land agent for the Atlantic and Pacific Railroad, and negotiated with Native Americans on behalf of then Governor of Missouri Thomas Clement Fletcher, gaining right of way to build a railroad on the 35th parallel. Sturgis moved to Cheyenne, Wyoming, in 1878 and was involved in banking, railroads and stockraising, spending fifteen years in the city. Sturgis became the leader of the Republican Party in Wyoming. He married Helen Rutgers Weir, daughter of Robert Walter Weir, on June 9, 1880. Sturgis organized and served as president of the Stockgrowers National Bank in Cheyenne. He was involved in the founding of and served as president of the Cheyenne and Northern Railway. He was secretary of the Wyoming Stock Growers Association for 14 years, and secretary of the National Cattle Growers Association. He was elected to the Wyoming Territorial Senate and chairman of the Republican Central Committee of the Territory while in Cheyenne, serving from 1882 to 1883.

Sturgis returned to New York City in 1887 or 1888, opening a building company, Sturgis & Hill. Sturgis soon became prominent in New York City business, owning stock or being a director of the Consolidated Ice Company, the Knickerbocker Ice Company, the American Ice Company, the Wyoming Development Company, and the Cheyenne Gas and Electric Light Company. He became treasurer of the Union Stock Yards. He was appointed to the Civil Service Commission of New York in 1896 and was made a trustee of the Elmira Correctional Facility in 1899, being elected president of the latter's board. Sturgis served as New York City Fire Commissioner from January 1, 1902, to December 31, 1903. He died February 25, 1914, in Eastbourne, England.

Fire appointments
| Preceded by John J. Scannell | FDNY Commissioner; 1902–1903 | Succeeded by Nicholas J. Hayes |
