= Ferdinand Pecora =

American judge (1882–1971)

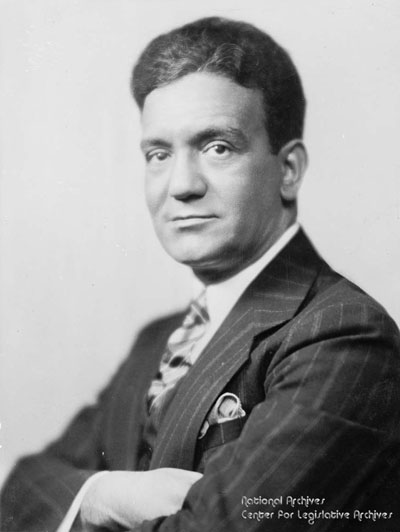
- Pecora c. 1933

Justice of the New York Supreme Court
- In office 1935–1950

Commissioner of the Securities and Exchange Commission
- In office July 2, 1934 – January 21, 1935
- President: Franklin D. Roosevelt
- Preceded by: Position established
- Succeeded by: James Delmage Ross

Personal details
- Born: January 6, 1882 Nicosia, Sicily, Italy
- Died: December 7, 1971 (aged 89) Manhattan, New York City, U.S.
- Children: 1
- Education: New York Law School

Ferdinand Pecora (January 6, 1882 – December 7, 1971) was an American lawyer and New York State Supreme Court judge who became famous in the 1930s as Chief Counsel to the United States Senate Committee on Banking and Currency during its investigation of Wall Street banking and stock brokerage practices.

== Early life ==
Ferdinand Pecora was born in Nicosia, Sicily, the son of Louis Pecora and Rosa Messina, who emigrated to the United States in 1886. He grew up in Chelsea, Manhattan. After briefly studying for the Episcopal ministry, Pecora attended St. Stephen's College (now Bard College) and the City University of New York before he was forced to leave school when his father was injured in an industrial accident.

== Career ==
After securing a job as a clerk in a Wall Street law firm, Pecora eventually attended New York Law School and became a member of the New York bar in 1911.

=== New York City public prosecution ===
Originally a Progressive Republican, he became a member of the Democratic Party and Tammany Hall in 1916. In 1918, he was appointed as an assistant district attorney in New York City. Over the next twelve years, he earned a reputation in the city as an honest and talented prosecutor. Although he had little experience with Wall Street, he helped shut down more than 100 bucket shops.

In 1922, Pecora was named chief assistant district attorney, the number-two man in the office under the newly elected Joab H. Banton. In 1929, Banton chose Pecora as his heir apparent, but Tammany Hall refused to nominate him, fearing that the honest Pecora might bring prosecutions against its members. Pecora left the district attorney's office for private practice, where he remained until 1933.

=== Senate ===
Ferdinand Pecora was appointed chief counsel to the U.S. Senate's Committee on Banking and Currency in January 1933 to replace Irving Ben Cooper by the outgoing committee chairman, Republican Peter Norbeck. He continued under Democratic chairman Duncan Fletcher, following the 1932 election that swept Franklin D. Roosevelt into the U.S. presidency and gave the Democratic Party control of the Senate. In fact, following a meeting with Senator Fletcher in March 1933, President Roosevelt publicly gave Pecora carte blanche to go wherever his investigations might lead him.

The Senate committee hearings that Pecora led probed the causes of the Wall Street crash of 1929 that launched a major reform of the American financial system. Pecora, aided by John T. Flynn, a journalist, and Max Lowenthal, a lawyer, personally undertook many of the interrogations during the hearings, including such Wall Street personalities as Richard Whitney, president of the New York Stock Exchange, George Whitney (a partner in J.P. Morgan & Co.) and investment bankers Thomas W. Lamont, Otto H. Kahn, Albert H. Wiggin of Chase National Bank, and Charles E. Mitchell of National City Bank (now Citibank). Because of Pecora's work, the hearings soon acquired the popular name the Pecora Commission, and Time magazine featured Pecora on the cover of its June 12, 1933, issue.

Pecora's investigation unearthed evidence of irregular practices in the financial markets that benefited the rich at the expense of ordinary investors, including exposure of Morgan's "preferred list" by which the bank's influential friends (including Calvin Coolidge, the former president, and Owen J. Roberts, a justice of Supreme Court of the United States) participated in stock offerings at steeply discounted rates. He also revealed that National City sold off bad loans to Latin American countries by packing them into securities and selling them to unsuspecting investors, that Wiggin had shorted Chase shares during the crash, profiting from falling prices, and that Mitchell and top officers at National City had received $2.4 million in interest-free loans from the bank's coffers.

Spurred by these revelations, the United States Congress enacted the Glass–Steagall Act, the Securities Act of 1933 and the Securities Exchange Act of 1934. With the United States in the grips of the Great Depression, Pecora's investigations highlighted the contrast between the lives of millions of Americans in abject poverty and the lives of such financiers as J.P. Morgan, Jr.; under Pecora's questioning, Morgan and many of his partners admitted that they had paid no income tax in 1931 and 1932; they explained their failure to pay taxes by reference to their losses in the stock market's decline.

=== SEC ===
After Pecora closed his investigations, on July 2, 1934, President Roosevelt appointed him a Commissioner of the newly formed U.S. Securities and Exchange Commission (SEC).

=== New York State Supreme Court and 1950 mayoral election ===
On January 21, 1935, Pecora resigned from the SEC (to be replaced by James Delmage Ross) and became a judge of the New York Supreme Court, a position he held until 1950, when he ran unsuccessfully against Vincent R. Impellitteri as the Democratic nominee for Mayor of New York City in the 1950 New York City special mayoral election.

On October 17, 1950, Judge Pecora and US Senator Herbert H. Lehman (D-NY) gave radio addresses on behalf of the CIO-PAC during prime (10:30–11:15 p.m.).

=== National Lawyers Guild ===
In 1937, Pecora was a founding member of the National Lawyers Guild (NLG). On March 1, 1938, Pecora become NLG president, noted as a "forceful speaker." Pecora resigned from the NLG during its third annual convention in 1939 after the vote against his resolution disavowing communists failed to carry in the national vote.

=== Private practice ===
Returning to the practice of law, Pecora represented such major clients as Warner Bros. Pictures Distributing Corporation, et al. as respondents before the Supreme Court of the United States in the 1954 case, Theatre Enterprises v. Paramount, 346 U.S. 537.

== Personal life ==
Pecora and his wife, Florence Louise Waterman, married in 1910 and had one son. He died at the Ottendorfer Public Library and Stuyvesant Polyclinic Hospital on December 7, 1971. He was 89.

== Works ==
In 1939, Pecora wrote a book about the Senate investigations titled Wall Street Under Oath: The Story of Our Modern Money Changers, which has been reprinted twice:

- Wall Street Under Oath: The Story of Our Modern Money Changers (1939)
