= Edward Francis Cavanagh Jr. =

American fire department commissioner (1906–1986)

Edward Francis Cavanagh Jr. (August 18, 1906 – June 17, 1986) was appointed the 18th Fire Commissioner of the City of New York by Mayor Robert F. Wagner Jr. on January 1, 1954 and served in that position until his resignation on December 31, 1961. He had previously served as the commissioner of the city Department of Marine and Aviation from 1950 to 1954. Cavanagh served as Deputy Mayor under Mayor Robert F. Wagner Jr. during his third term. He died in 1986 at Morristown Memorial Hospital in Morristown, New Jersey.

Fire appointments
Preceded by Jacob Grumet	FDNY Commissioner; 1954–1961	Succeeded by Edward Thompson
