= Elmer Mustard =

Elmer Mustard (died March 1, 1940) was appointed the 13th Fire Commissioner of the City of New York by Mayor Fiorello H. La Guardia on February 23, 1940 due to the sudden retirement of Fire Commissioner John J. McElligott under questionable circumstances.

== Biography ==
He was appointed to the Fire Department on January 1, 1901 and assigned to Engine 26. He was made Captain on December 24, 1910, on May 11, 1918 he was made Acting Chief of Battalion (at the time he was Captain of Hook & Ladder 17) then on August 1, 1919 he became Chief of the 44th Battalion. In December 1937, as Deputy Chief, he was put in charge of the boroughs of Brooklyn and Queens. Chief Mustard went on to become Chief of Department and was sworn in as Deputy Commissioner on January 1, 1939, from which post he was elevated to Commissioner as noted above.

On February 24, 1940, Mayor LaGuardia voided McElligott's retirement, and ordered him to return to his position as Fire Commissioner. Three days later, on February 27, McElligott resumed his position as Fire Commissioner.

Elmer Mustard only served four days as Fire Commissioner and died of a heart attack on March 1, 1940, three days after leaving his position as the shortest serving Fire Commissioner in New York City history.

Fire appointments
Preceded by John J. McElligott	FDNY Commissioner; February 23–27, 1940	Succeeded by John J. McElligott
