= Frank J. Quayle Jr. =

Frank J. Quayle Jr. (May 18, 1892 – June 22, 1971) was appointed the 15th Fire Commissioner of the City of New York by Mayor William O'Dwyer on January 1, 1946 and served in that position until his resignation on December 1, 1950.

He was born in Brooklyn to Frank J. Quayle Sr.

He was appointed the 15th Fire Commissioner of New York City by Mayor William O'Dwyer on January 1, 1946 and served in that position until his resignation on December 1, 1950.

He later became the postmaster for Brooklyn. He died on June 22, 1971.

Fire appointments
Preceded by Patrick Walsh	FDNY Commissioner; 1946–1950	Succeeded by George P. Monaghan
