= Thomas Francis Murphy =

US federal judge (1905–1995)

Senior Judge of the United States District Court for the Southern District of New York
- In office December 3, 1970 – October 26, 1995

Judge of the United States District Court for the Southern District of New York
- In office July 2, 1951 – December 3, 1970
- Appointed by: Harry S. Truman
- Preceded by: Harold Medina
- Succeeded by: Murray Gurfein

Personal details
- Born: Thomas Francis Murphy; December 3, 1905 New York City, New York, U.S.
- Died: October 26, 1995 (aged 89) Salisbury, Connecticut, U.S.
- Party: Democratic
- Education: Georgetown University (A.B.); Fordham University School of Law (LL.B.)

Thomas Francis Murphy (December 3, 1905 – October 26, 1995) was a United States district judge of the United States District Court for the Southern District of New York.

== Early life and education ==
Born on December 3, 1905, in Manhattan, New York City, New York, Murphy's grandfather was a police officer and his father chief clerk of the city's Department of Water Supply, Gas and Electricity. Murphy attended Regis High School and then received an Artium Baccalaureus degree in 1927 from Georgetown University and a Bachelor of Laws in 1930 from Fordham University School of Law. He entered private practice of law until 1942.

== Career ==
From 1942 to 1950, Murphy served as an Assistant United States Attorney for the Southern District of New York. He became head of the criminal division in 1944 and from 1949 to 1950 served as prosecutor in the two perjury trials of Alger Hiss, winning a conviction in the second after the first ended in a hung jury. Murphy served briefly as New York City Police Commissioner from September 1950 to June 1951. At the time of his appointment, the New York Times described him as "a reader of Proust as a change from law books" and said that members of all political parties greeted his appointment with such unanimity as to suggest that he was "certain of continued tenure if he does the job expected of him". After he resigned to become a federal judge, New York City Mayor Vincent Impellitteri said Murphy had laid the groundwork for ridding the department of corruption: "He had restored the self respect of police officers who had suffered through the greed of their corrupt comrades."

== Federal judicial service ==
Murphy was nominated by President Harry S. Truman on June 11, 1951, to a seat on the United States District Court for the Southern District of New York vacated by Judge Harold Medina. He was confirmed by the United States Senate on June 29, 1951, and received his commission on July 2, 1951. He assumed senior status on December 3, 1970. His service terminated on October 26, 1995, due to his death.

=== Notable cases ===
Murphy presided at a jury trial that determined that the Swedish sex film I Am Curious (Yellow) was obscene. He called it "repulsive and revolting" and ordered it confiscated, but was later overruled by the United States Court of Appeals for the Second Circuit.

Murphy also presided at the 1958 wiretapping trial of James R. Hoffa, the president of the International Brotherhood of Teamsters.

Murphy moved to Connecticut in 1968. Serving by designation on the United States District Court for the District of Connecticut, he presided at the trial of Vladimir Samarin, a former Yale University instructor, who was accused of lying about his activities as a Nazi propagandist during World War II both when immigrated and when seeking United States citizenship.

== Personal and death ==
Murphy was described at the time as "a lifelong Democrat". His younger brother, Johnny, had a long career in professional baseball as a pitcher with the New York Yankees and the Boston Red Sox, then as general manager of the New York Mets. Murphy died in a nursing home at the age of 89, in Salisbury, Connecticut, on October 26, 1995.

Murphy was survived by his wife Katherine.

== See also ==
- List of United States federal judges by longevity of service

== Sources ==
- "Murphy, Thomas Francis - Federal Judicial Center". www.fjc.gov.

Police appointments
| Preceded by William P. O'Brien | New York City Police Commissioner; 1950–1951 | Succeeded by George P. Monaghan |
Legal offices
| Preceded by Harold Medina | Judge of the United States District Court for the Southern District of New York; 1951–1970 | Succeeded by Murray Gurfein |
