= Richard Harper Laimbeer =

American judge

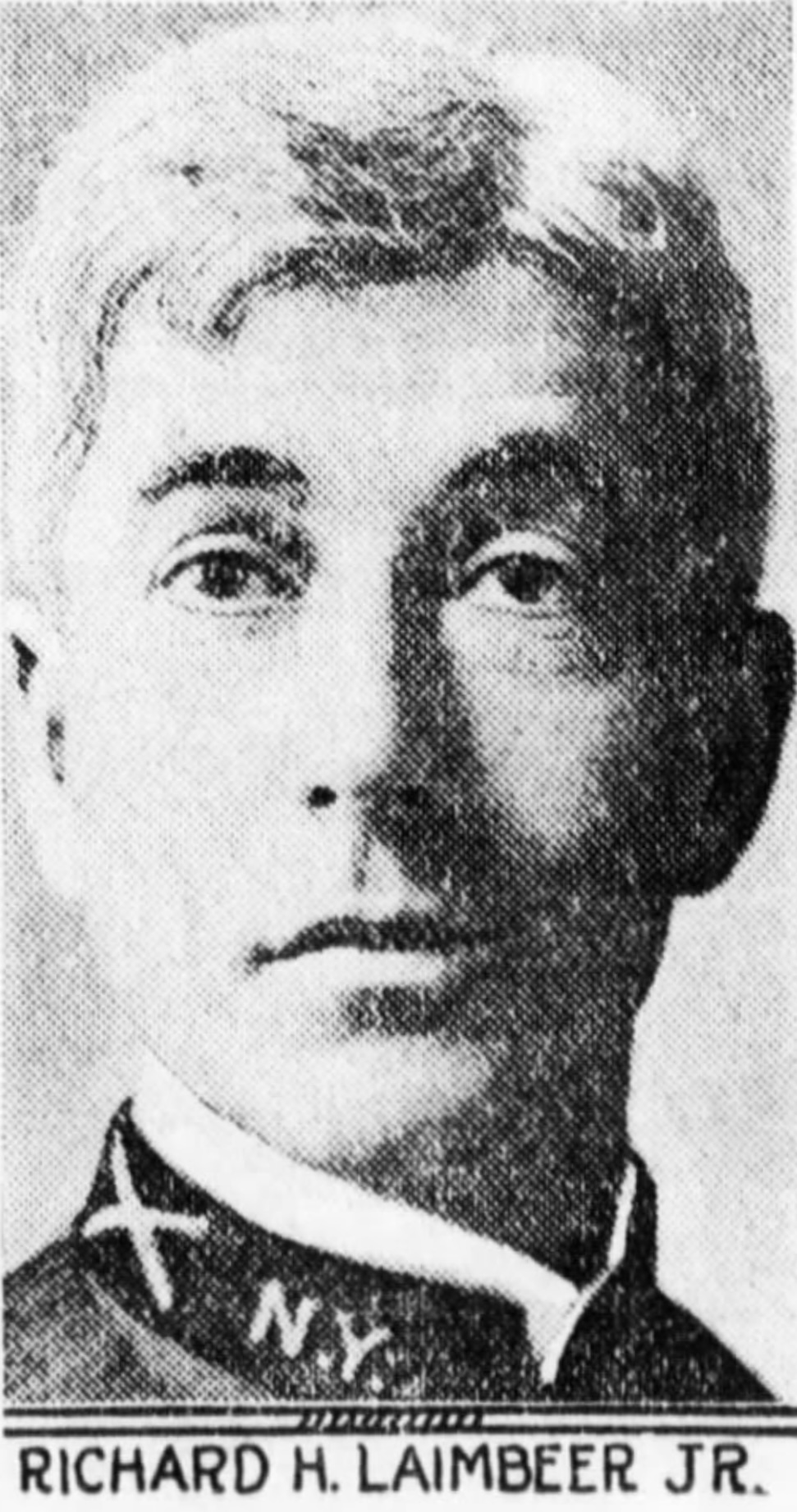

Richard Harper Laimbeer Jr. (July 11, 1857 − February 19, 1934) was a judge of the Court of Special Sessions and a Deputy Fire Commissioner in New York City.

== Life ==
Laimbeer was born in Brooklyn on July 11, 1857. His father was Richard H. Laimbeer, who emigrated from Britain in 1849, settling in Brooklyn, where he ran a grain storage business and became a millionaire. His mother was Catherine J. Laimbeer, née Radcliffe.

Laimbeer was educated at the Brooklyn Polytechnic Institute and Columbia Law School, and practiced law after graduating in 1878. In 1883 he married Belle Meafoy, of South Brooklyn.

== Career ==
He was one of the commissioners who determined the route of the subway running from City Hall in Manhattan to Borough Hall in Brooklyn.

In 1884 he ran for the Brooklyn assembly in the First District, as a Republican, but was defeated by Moses Wafer.

In April 1895 Laimbeer was appointed by Charles Schieren, mayor of Brooklyn, to fill a vacated magistrate position at the Ewen Street court, succeeding William Watson. He served the remainder of Watson's term, leaving the post in April 1896. During his term he was especially severe in sentencing wife-beaters.

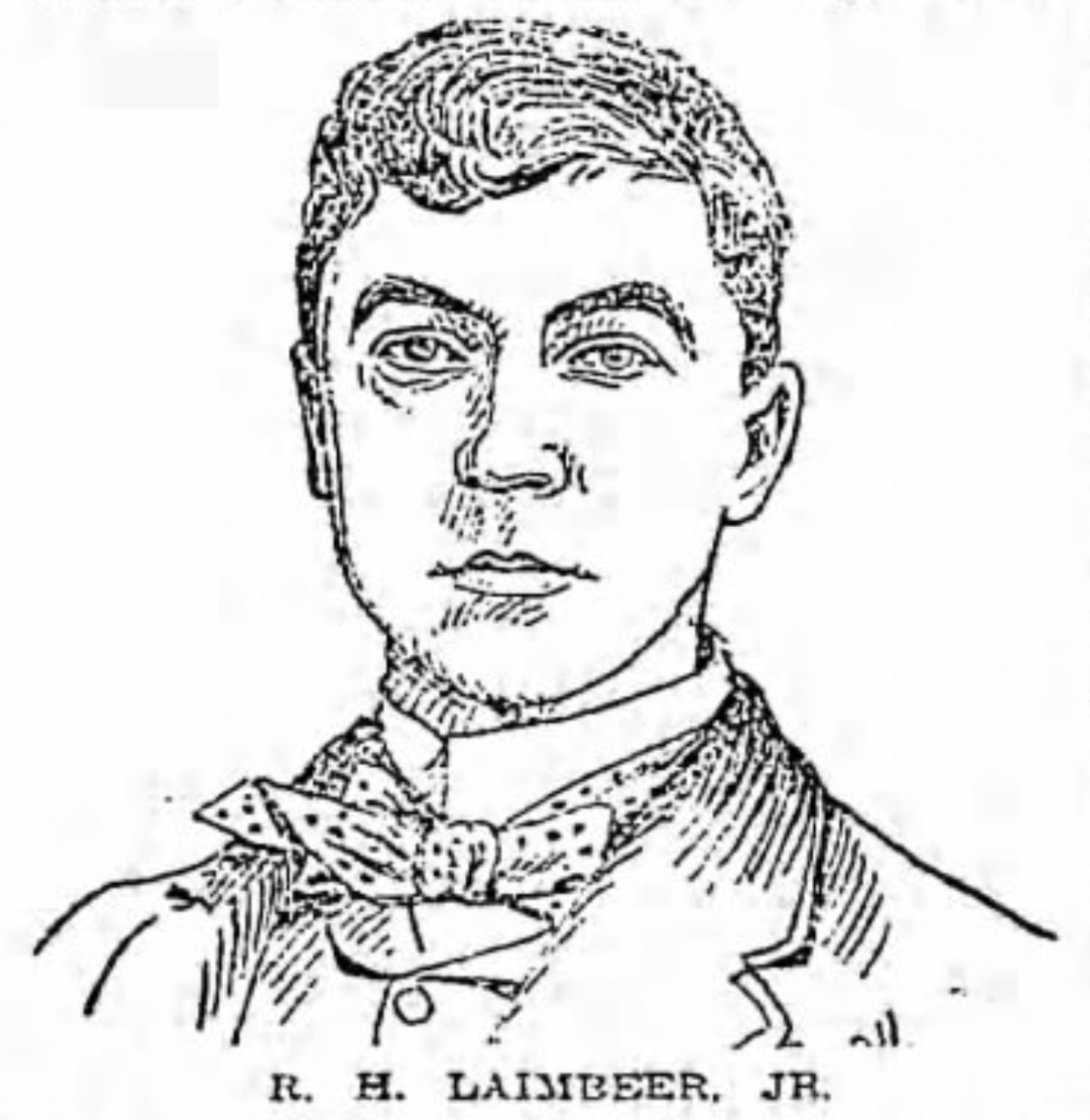
Laimbeer in 1896

Laimbeer enlisted in the New York National Guard's 7th Regiment in 1879, serving as a private until 1884. During the Spanish-American War, he helped organize the 114th Regiment, serving in it as a captain. He served in the 2nd Brigade, initially, in 1900, as regimental quartermaster, and then as aide-de-camp, and was briefly an aide-de-camp to the governor before being promoted to major in 1903. He became quartermaster in 1903 and judge advocate in 1904. He retired from the National Guard in 1910.

He was twice given the post of Deputy Fire Commissioner. He was appointed by Mayor Seth Low in January 1902, and again in January 1914 by Mayor John Purroy Mitchel. The latter appointment was at a salary of $5,000 per year. He was expected to be appointed Commissioner of Records in 1921, but the Register, Edward Maddox, refused to appoint him, as part of a fight over political patronage.

Laimbeer was a relative of Benjamin Odell, the Governor of New York, and in 1903 Odell attempted to appoint Laimbeer as the chair of the party's executive committee, replacing Jacob Brenner, but met with resistance from the committee members and senior party members such as Timothy Woodruff.

Laimbeer was for a while the Republican leader of the Third Assembly District, in Brooklyn. He was elected to the district leadership in 1899, but lost two years later, and then won the position back in 1903, competing against M. C. Hanton in each election. An ally of his was accused of paying a voter to vote for Laimbeer in the 1903 election. Laimbeer resigned in 1922, and was succeeded by Anthony De Martini, an ally of Laimbeer's.

== Sources ==
- Annual Report of the Adjutant-General of the State of New York for the Year 1904 Vol. II (PDF). Albany, New York: Brandon Printing Company. 1905.
