= Francis W. H. Adams =

American attorney and police commissioner

Police Commissioner of New York City
- In office January 1, 1954 – August 2, 1955
- Mayor: Robert F. Wagner Jr.
- Preceded by: George P. Monaghan
- Succeeded by: Stephen P. Kennedy

United States Attorney for the Southern District of New York Acting
- In office May 16, 1935 – November 20, 1935
- President: Franklin D. Roosevelt
- Preceded by: Martin Conboy
- Succeeded by: Lamar Hardy

Francis William Holbrooke Adams (June 26, 1904 – April 20, 1990) was an American lawyer who served as the New York City Police Commissioner from 1954 to 1955.

== Biography ==
Adams was born in Mount Vernon, New York, on June 26, 1904. He grew up in Saddle River, New Jersey, and rode to horseback to school in nearby Ho-Ho-Kus, New Jersey. He graduated from Williams College in 1925 and Fordham Law School in 1928. Upon graduation, he joined the firm O'Brien, Boardman, Memhard, Fox & Early, where he had worked as a clerk while in law school.

In 1934, he became assistant United States Attorney for the Southern District of New York.

Adams also served as an assistant counsel to the 1963–64 Warren Commission (the "President's Commission on the Assassination of President Kennedy").

He died on April 20, 1990, in Devon, Pennsylvania.

Police appointments
Preceded by George P. Monaghan	NYPD Commissioner; 1954–1955	Succeeded by Stephen P. Kennedy
