= Thomas J. Drennan =

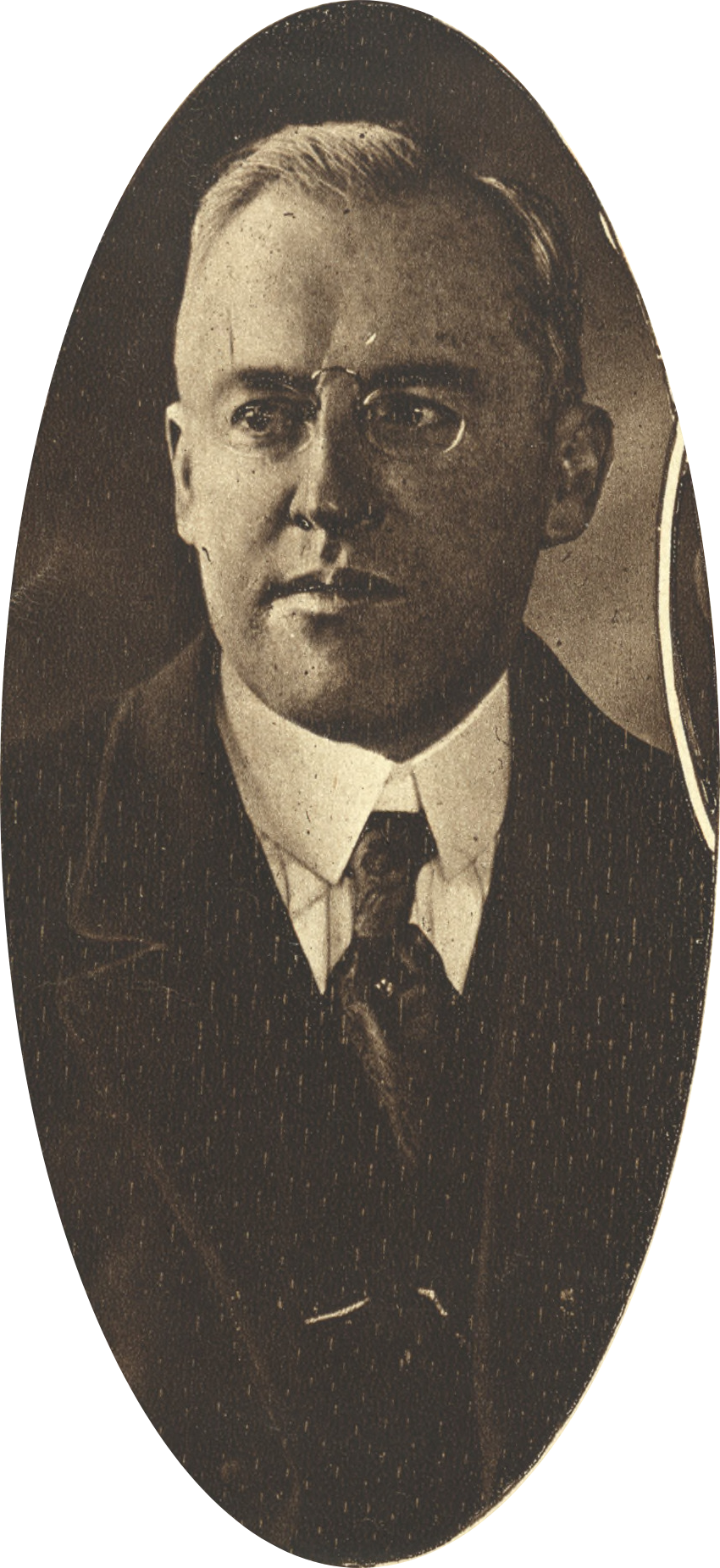
Drennan in 1918

Thomas J. Drennan (1877 – July 15, 1928) was appointed the tenth New York City Fire Commissioner by Mayor John F. Hylan.

== Biography ==
He was born in 1877. He was appointed the tenth Fire Commissioner of the City of New York by Mayor John F. Hylan on January 1, 1918, and resigned his position on April 30, 1926. He died on July 15, 1928, of a heart attack. He was buried in Calvary Cemetery in Woodside, New York.

Fire appointments
Preceded by Robert Adamson	FDNY Commissioner; 1918–1926	Succeeded by John J. Dorman
