= John J. Scannell =

John Jay Scannell
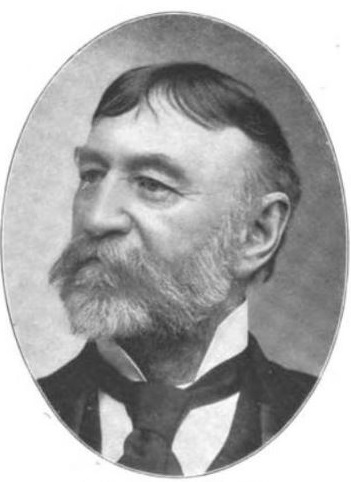

1st New York City Fire Commissioner
- In office January 1, 1898 – December 31, 1904
- Appointed by: Robert Anderson Van Wyck
- Preceded by: Inaugural holder
- Succeeded by: Thomas Sturgis

Personal details
- Born: 1841 New York City, U.S.
- Died: March 5, 1918 (aged 77) Queens, New York, U.S.
- Cause of death: Pneumonia

John Jay Scannell (1841 – March 5, 1918) was a Tammany Hall politician who was the leader of the Eleventh Assembly District. He was appointed the first New York City Fire Commissioner of the new consolidated New York City.

== Early life ==
He was born in 1841 and had two brothers: Florence Scannell who was killed in 1869 in a bar-room fight; and Edward A. Scannell, who on Christmas Eve of 1875 killed a man named Henry Wilson, in what appeared to be a random attack. However, John J. Scannell had already shot and killed Thomas Donahue in revenge for the killing of his brother in 1872. He was arrested and was acquitted on the grounds of emotional insanity. While he was imprisoned in The Tombs, he met Richard Croker, the future head of Tammany Hall and they developed a friendship. Croker was at the time also imprisoned and charged with murder, for which he was found innocent.

== Career ==
In 1893, he was appointed a 6-year term as the New York City Fire Commissioner by Mayor Thomas F. Gilroy replacing S. Howland Robbins, the salary was $5,000 per year (approximately $179,000 today in current dollars). He was appointed the 1st Fire Commissioner of the Consolidated City of New York by Tammany Hall Mayor Robert A. Van Wyck on January 1, 1898. He served in that position until the end of the Van Wyck Administration on December 31, 1901. In 1901 he was indicted for being involved in a kickback scheme for the purchasing of supplies by the New York City Fire Department.

== Personal life ==
He was married to Ophelia Scannell (1845–1883). Together, they were the parents of:

- Florence Scannell (1873–1878), who died young.
- Clark Scannell (1877–1883), who also died young.

By 1902 he bought a farm on Newburgh, New York. He later purchased Chateau Ophelia in Saratoga Springs, New York, for $53,000.

He died on March 5, 1918, of pneumonia at St. Mary's Hospital in Queens, New York.

Fire appointments
Preceded by (none)	FDNY Commissioner; 1898–1901	Succeeded by Thomas Sturgis
