= Patrick J. Walsh (FDNY Commissioner) =

American fire commissioner (1873–1946)

Patrick J. Walsh (1873 – September 21, 1946) was appointed Acting Fire Commissioner of the City of New York by Mayor Fiorello H. La Guardia on May 8, 1941, and was subsequently appointed the 14th Fire Commissioner of the City of New York by Mayor LaGuardia two days later. He served in that position until the end of the LaGuardia Administration on December 31, 1945. He died on September 22, 1946, at the West Hill Sanitarium.

Fire appointments
Preceded by John J. McElligott	FDNY Commissioner; 1941–1945	Succeeded by Frank J. Quayle
