= Robert S. Tucker =

American businessman and philanthropist

35th New York City Fire Commissioner
- In office August 12, 2024 – December 19, 2025
- Mayor: Eric Adams
- First Deputy: Mark Guerra
- Preceded by: Laura Kavanagh
- Succeeded by: Mark Guerra

Personal details
- Born: March 16, 1970 (age 56) New York, New York, U.S.
- Education: George Washington University (BA); Pace University School of Law (JD)

Robert S. Tucker (born March 16, 1970) is an American government official, businessman, and philanthropist who was the New York City Fire Commissioner from 2024 to 2025, serving under Mayor Eric Adams.

He was chairman and CEO of T&M USA, a security and investigative services company.

== Career and education ==
Tucker graduated from George Washington University and Pace University School of Law. Following law school, Tucker worked as special assistant to the District Attorney in Queens County, Richard A. Brown.

In 1999 Tucker became chairman and CEO of T&M Protection Resources, a company specializing in security, intelligence and investigations. In 2007 Tucker restructured T&M as a limited liability company and sold a minority interest to Pegasus Capital Advisors as well as another private investor.

In 2008 Tucker and Pegasus commenced a plan to invest jointly in acquisitions of security companies in Israel which has resulted in T&M's subsidiary, T&M Holding Israel Ltd, becoming one of the largest security and janitorial service companies in the country with over 7,000 employees.

== Government service ==
Tucker was appointed commissioner of the FDNY by New York City Mayor Eric Adams on August 12, 2024. Six weeks before the appointment, eight employees of Tucker's former business made contributions to Adams on the same day. Tucker had never been a firefighter or emergency response official and is a self-described "fire buff" who cites his time as a young boy chasing fire engines as inspiration for his service.

A day after Zohran Mamdani's victory in the 2025 New York City mayoral election, Tucker submitted a resignation notice to Adams, with his last day in office being December 19, 2025. Tucker cited his Jewish faith and— according to people close to him who spoke to Bloomberg News— felt that as a Zionist, he would be unable to serve under Mamdani.

== Philanthropy and community involvement ==
Tucker is vice president of the board of directors of the Richard Tucker Music Foundation, named for his grandfather. The foundation provides three grants to aspiring opera singers. Tucker's father, Barry Tucker, serves as president of the board.

Additionally, Tucker serves as board member for the New York City Police Foundation, White Plains Hospital, and Pace University.

Fire appointments
Preceded by Laura Kavanagh	New York City Fire Commissioner; August 12, 2024 – December 19, 2025	Succeeded by Mark Guerra
