= Joseph Johnson (FDNY Commissioner) =

American state official

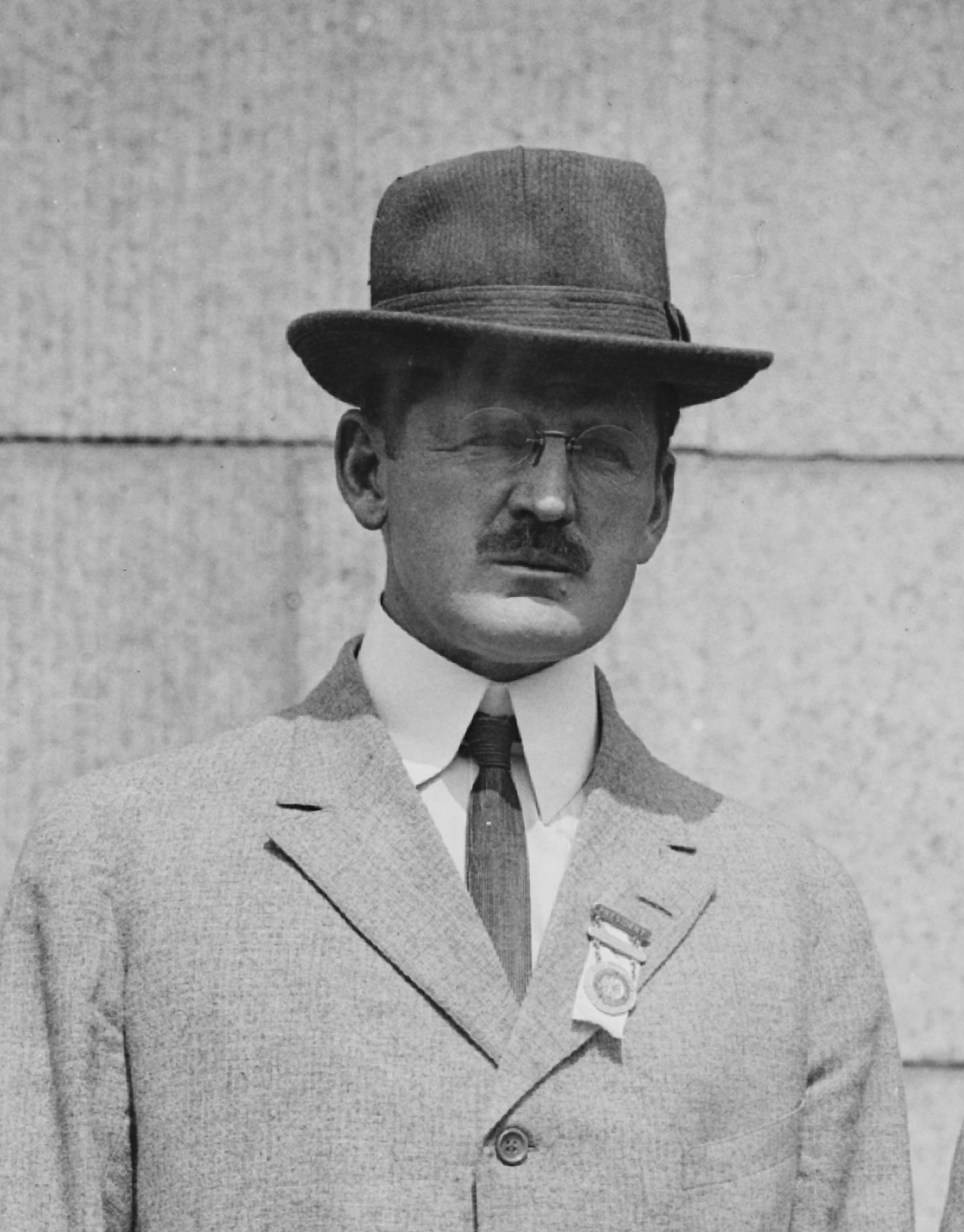
- Joseph Johnson in 1913

8th New York City Fire Commissioner
- In office 1911–1913
- Appointed by: William Jay Gaynor
- Preceded by: Rhinelander Waldo
- Succeeded by: Robert Adamson

Personal details
- Born: Joseph H. Johnson Jr. June 16, 1871 Griffin, Georgia, U.S.
- Died: March 7, 1942 (aged 70) Atlanta, Georgia, U.S.

Joseph H. Johnson Jr. (June 16, 1871 – March 7, 1942) was an American state official. He was New York City Fire Commissioner from 1911 to 1913. He was chief of the New York City Transit Authority. By 1918 he was deputy New York City Comptroller. He served as chief of the New York Public Service Commission in 1921.

== Biography ==
Johnson was born on June 16, 1871, in Griffin, Georgia, to Joseph H. Johnson Sr. and Sarah E. Beeks. He first worked as a newspaper man.

Johnson was appointed the 8th New York City Fire Commissioner by Mayor William Jay Gaynor on June 1, 1911, and served in that position until the end of the term of Mayor Ardolph L. Kline in 1913.

Johnson was deputy New York City Comptroller and he took a leave of absence in 1918, when the United States entered World War I, to temporarily join the American Red Cross.

Johnson later was Chief of the Transit Bureau of the Public Service Commission.

Johnson was appointed as chief of the Commissioner of Public Works in 1921 replacing Clarence Fay.

Johnson died at his Atlanta, Georgia, home on March 7, 1942.

Fire appointments
| Preceded by Rhinelander Waldo | FDNY Commissioner; 1911–1913 | Succeeded by Robert Adamson |
