= Laura Kavanagh =

New York City Fire Commissioner from 2022 to 2024

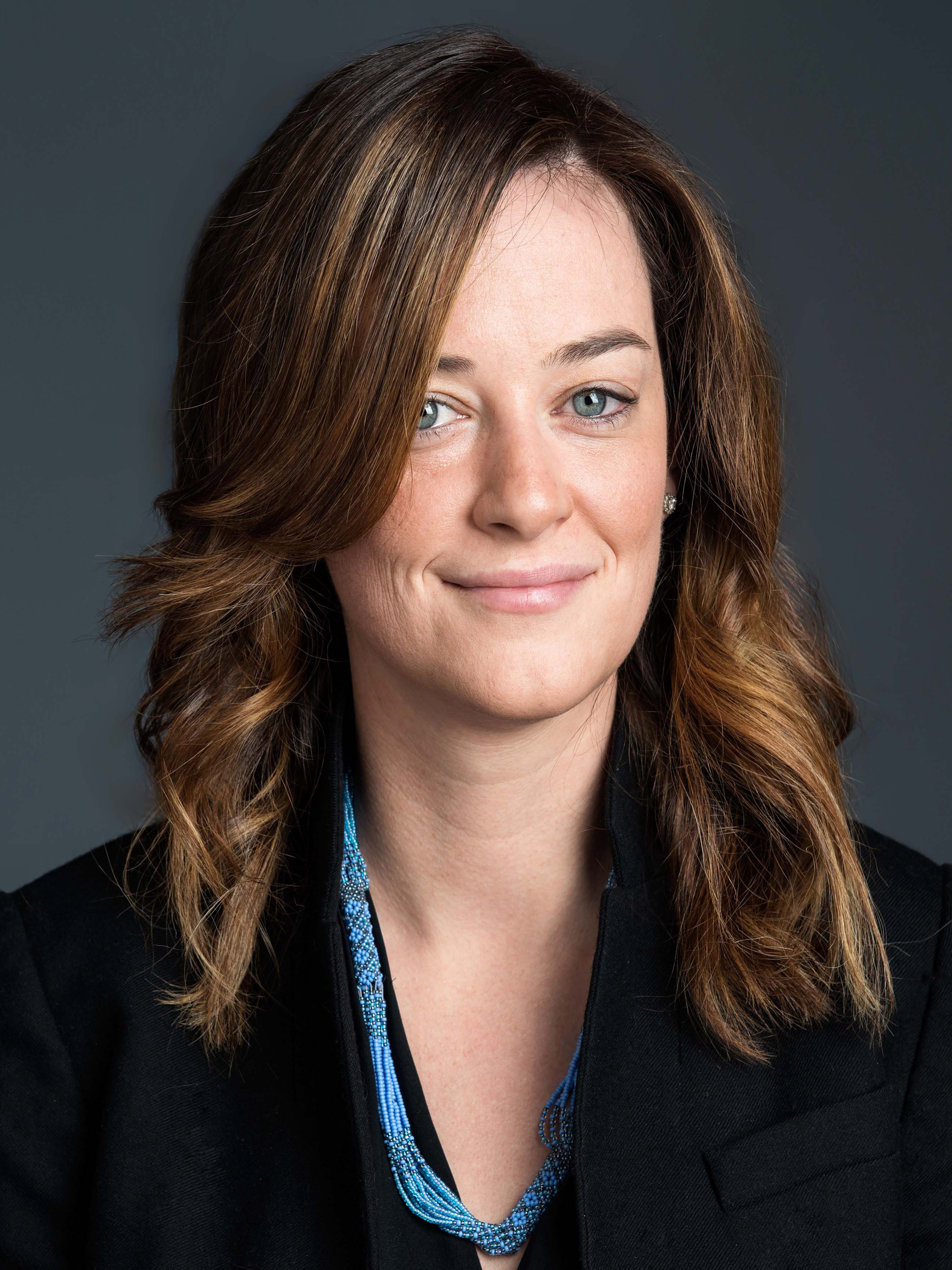
- Kavanagh being sworn in as New York City's 34th Fire Commissioner at official ceremony on Thursday, October 27, 2022

34th New York City Fire Commissioner
- In office Acting: February 16, 2022 – October 27, 2022; October 27, 2022 – August 12, 2024
- Mayor: Eric Adams
- Preceded by: Daniel A. Nigro
- Succeeded by: Robert Tucker

First Deputy Commissioner of New York City Fire Department
- In office January 2018 – February 16, 2022
- Commissioner: Daniel A. Nigro
- Preceded by: Robert Turner
- Succeeded by: Joseph Pfeifer

Personal details
- Born: 1981 or 1982
- Education: Whittier College (BS); Columbia University (MPA)

Laura R. Kavanagh (born 1981 or 1982) is an American government official who served as the 34th commissioner of the New York City Fire Department (FDNY). She was the first woman to hold the position. Appointed by Mayor Eric Adams on October 27, 2022, Kavanagh oversaw the diversification of the FDNY applicant pool, including graduating the largest group of women in nearly three decades.

Prior to her appointment as Fire Commissioner, Kavanagh spent several years with the FDNY, involved in the agency's response to major incidents including the Ebola outbreak of 2014 and the 2020 COVID-19 pandemic. Kavanagh's tenure as commissioner was met with opposition by rank-and-file members of the FDNY based on her relatively young age, lack of any experience as a first responder and allegations of her department's demoting older and more experienced fire chiefs.

Kavanagh resigned on August 7, 2024.

== Early life ==
Kavanagh grew up near San Francisco, the only child of a public school teacher and a telephone company worker. Upon graduation from Whittier College in California with a BA in Political Science and International Relations, she moved to New York City and lived in all five boroughs, managing and campaign consulting for non-profits, community-based organizations and unions. She earned a Master of Public Administration degree from Columbia University's School for International and Public Affairs. Kavanagh completed the Executive Leaders Program at the Naval Postgraduate School’s Center for Homeland Defense and Security, and the Stanford Graduate School of Business’ Summer Institute.

== Career ==
Kavanagh has held senior roles on Presidential, Mayoral, Congressional and local campaigns. She was a Special Assistant to Mayor Bill de Blasio, and during the 2012 United States presidential election, she served as Deputy Director in Pennsylvania on Barack Obama's reelection campaign.

She joined the FDNY in 2014, first as Director of External Affairs before her promotion as Assistant Commissioner for External Affairs several months later. In 2015, she was appointed Deputy Commissioner for Government Affairs and Special Programs, became First Deputy Commissioner in 2017 and served as acting Fire Commissioner in February 2022 after the retirement of Fire Commissioner Daniel Nigro. She has never served as a firefighter. An avid runner, Commissioner Kavanagh has completed two New York City Marathons and is a regular participant in the stair climbs that honor fallen first responders and their families.

Commissioner Kavanagh was heckled at the NYC's 2024 St. Patrick’s Day Parade after her department vowed to go after Trump-supporting FDNY members who booed New York Attorney General Letitia James at a promotion ceremony. Department Chief John Hodgens issued a warning about an investigation by the Bureau of Investigation and urged those who participated to come clean.

On July 13, 2024, Commissioner Kavanagh announced her resignation, intending to stay in her position to help with the transition until a suitable replacement is found.

Fire appointments
Preceded by Daniel A. Nigro	New York City Fire Commissioner; February 22, 2022 – August 12, 2024	Succeeded by Robert S. Tucker
