= Daniel Nigro =

Commissioner of New York City Fire Department from 2014 to 2022

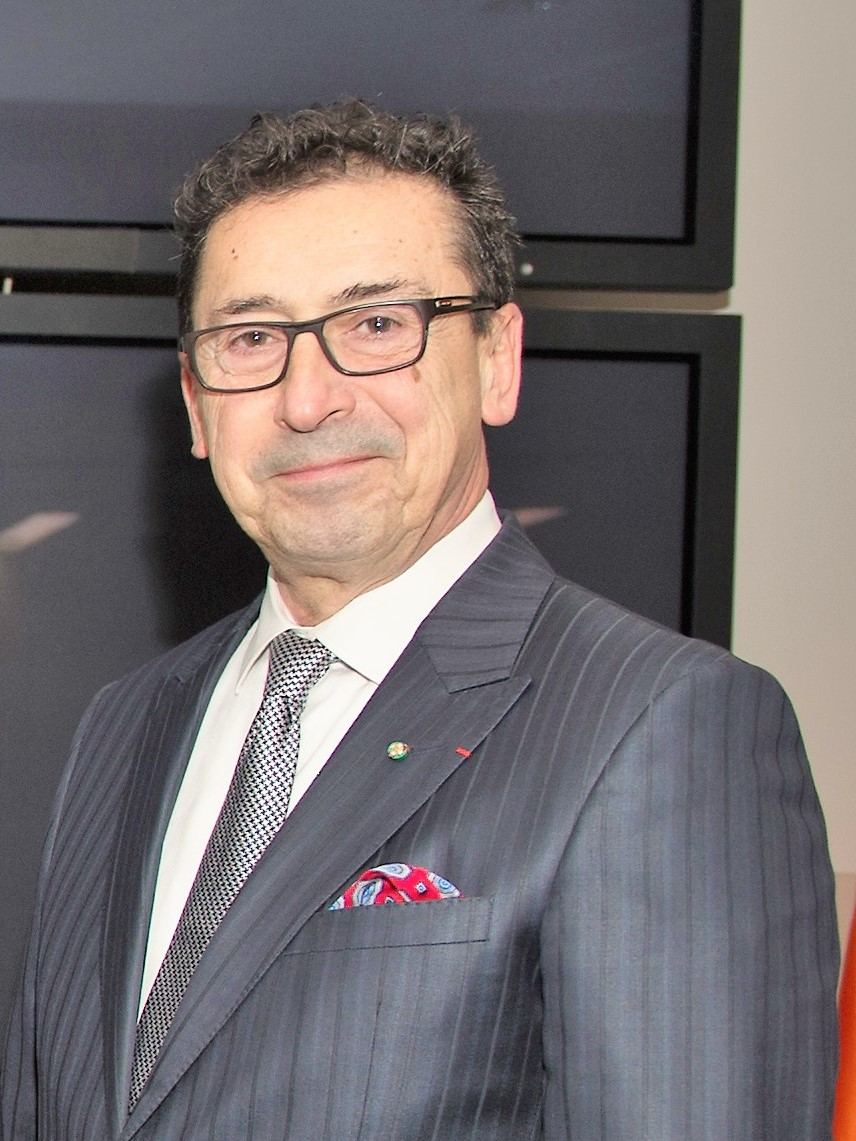

33rd New York City Fire Commissioner
- In office June 9, 2014 – February 16, 2022
- Mayor: Bill de Blasio; Eric Adams
- Preceded by: Salvatore Cassano
- Succeeded by: Laura Kavanagh

Personal details
- Born: October 11, 1948 (age 78) New York City, U.S.

Daniel A. Nigro (born October 11, 1948) is the former New York City Fire Commissioner of the New York City Fire Department (FDNY). He served this position from 2014 until his retirement in 2022. Nigro's appointment was announced on May 9, 2014, and he was sworn in on June 9.

Nigro was the 33rd Fire Commissioner in the 150-year history of the New York City Fire Department. The Commissioner is the most senior member of the fire department, and it is a civilian, non-uniformed office.

== Early life ==
Nigro grew up in the Bayside neighborhood of Queens, New York. He later attended Baruch College. Nigro's father was a Captain in the FDNY.

== Career ==
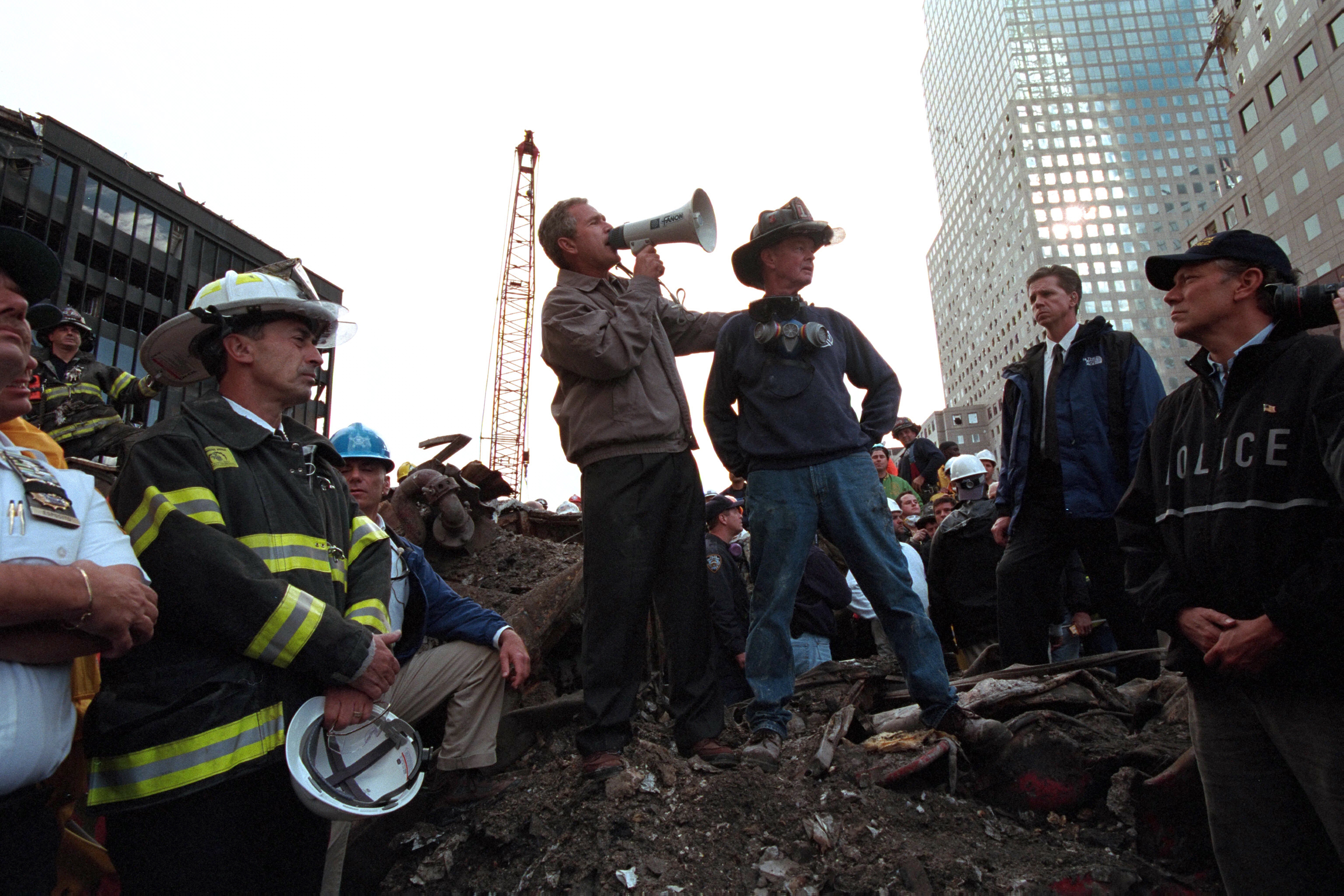
Daniel A. Nigro (2nd from left) as FDNY Chief of Operations during the visit to the World Trade Center site by President George W. Bush, September 14, 2001.

In 1969, Nigro joined the FDNY. He became a Deputy Chief in 1993, and in 1996, he oversaw the merging of the city's ambulance squads with the fire department.

Nigro was appointed Chief of the Department—the highest-ranking uniformed position—following the death of Chief Peter J. Ganci Jr., in the 9/11 attacks. Nigro was regarded for his leadership following the deaths of 343 firefighters in the attacks.

Nigro retired as Chief in 2002. That same year, in retirement, Nigro was a member of an FDNY anti-terrorism task force.

Regarding Nigro's appointment as Commissioner, New York City Mayor Bill de Blasio said: "Our administration is committed to building on this department’s impressive record, increasing diversity in the ranks, and improving response time and I know Daniel has what it takes to lead the FDNY forward".

In 2022, Nigro retired as Commissioner of the FDNY, effective February 16, 2022.

Nigro received an honorary doctorate of humane letters from Manhattan College in May 2023, and delivered the Commencement address at the College's Graduate Commencement Ceremony.

Fire appointments
| Preceded by Salvatore Cassano | FDNY Commissioner; 2014–2022 | Succeeded by Laura Kavanagh |
