= Vincent R. Impellitteri =

American politician and jurist (1900–1987)

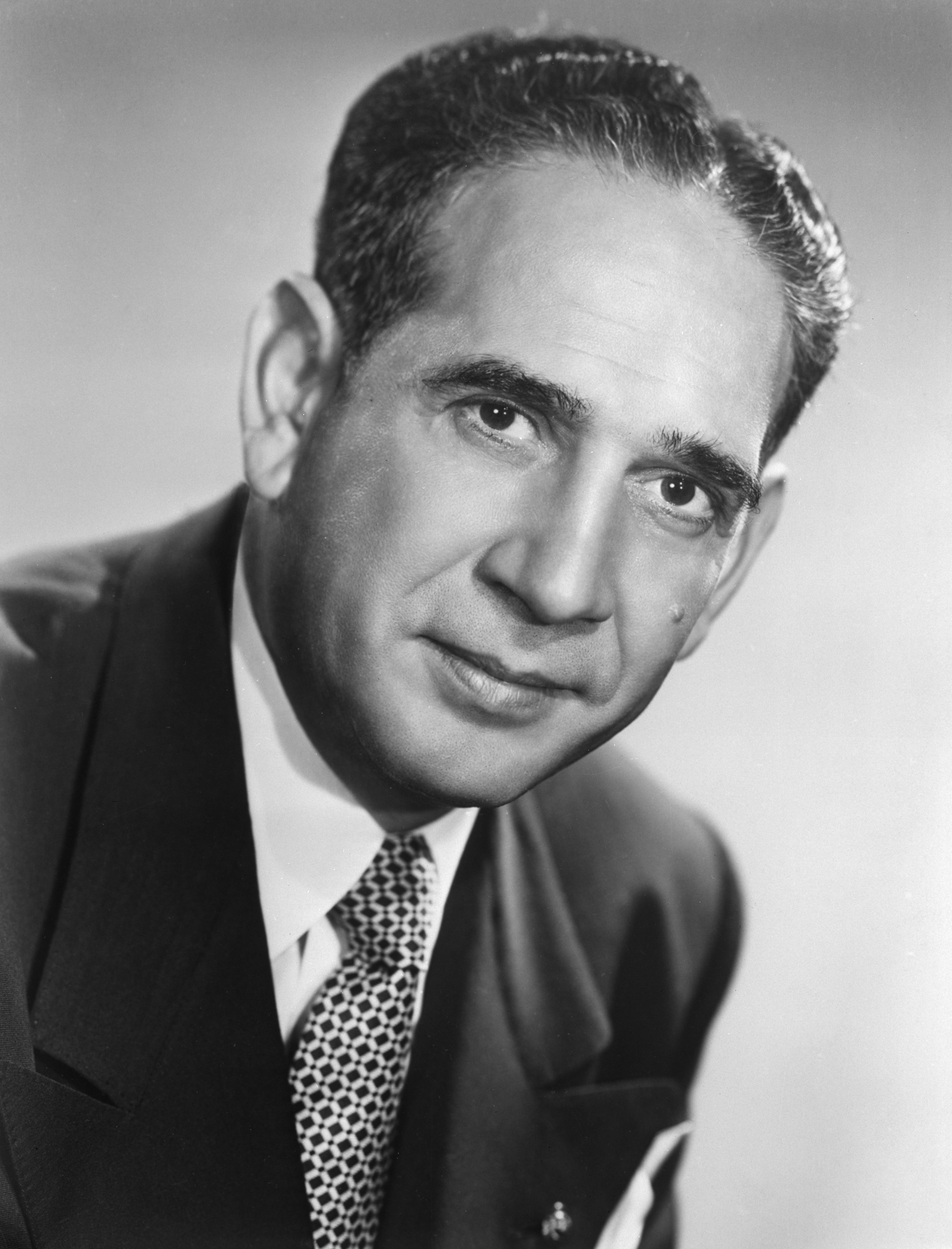
- Impelliteri c. 1950

102nd Mayor of New York City
- In office November 14, 1950 – December 31, 1953; Acting: August 31, 1950 – November 14, 1950
- Preceded by: William O'Dwyer
- Succeeded by: Robert F. Wagner, Jr.

2nd President of the New York City Council
- In office January 1, 1946 – August 31, 1950
- Preceded by: Newbold Morris
- Succeeded by: Joseph T. Sharkey (acting); Rudolph Halley

Personal details
- Born: Vincenzo Impellitteri; February 4, 1900 Isnello, Sicily, Kingdom of Italy
- Died: January 29, 1987 (aged 86) Bridgeport, Connecticut, U.S.
- Resting place: Mount Saint Peter Catholic Cemetery, Derby, Connecticut
- Party: Democratic
- Spouse: Elizabeth Agnes McLaughlin (m. 1926; died 1967)
- Education: Fordham University (LL.B.)
- Profession: Attorney

Military service
- Allegiance: United States
- Branch/service: United States Navy
- Years of service: 1917–1919 (active)
- Rank: Petty officer third class
- Unit: USS Stockton
- Battles/wars: World War I: Battle of the Atlantic (1914-1918)

Vincent Richard Impellitteri (born Vincenzo Impellitteri; February 4, 1900 – January 29, 1987) was an Italian-American politician and judge who served as the 102nd Mayor of New York City from 1950 to 1953. He was elected as a Democrat and president of the City Council in 1945 and reelected in 1949. When Mayor William O'Dwyer resigned in 1950, he became acting mayor. In the special election that year, party bosses denied him the Democratic nomination for the rest of the term but was subsequently elected mayor on a new ticket, the "Experience Party". He lost the Democratic primary when he ran for a full term in 1953 and became a judge in 1954.

== Early life ==
Born Vincenzo Impellitteri in Isnello, Sicily, he moved with his family to the United States as an infant in 1901. They settled in Ansonia, Connecticut, where Impellitteri spent most of his youth. He was a Catholic. He enlisted in the United States Navy for World War I. He served as a radioman with the rank of petty officer third class on board the destroyer USS Stockton, which was based in Queenstown, Ireland, and performed convoy escort and antisubmarine duty. He left the Navy after the war and became a U.S. citizen in 1922. After that, Impellitteri attended the Fordham University School of Law (where he received his LL.B. in 1924) while working successively as a night bellboy and manager at a Broadway hotel. He married Elizabeth (Betty) Agnes McLaughlin in 1926.

== Start of career ==
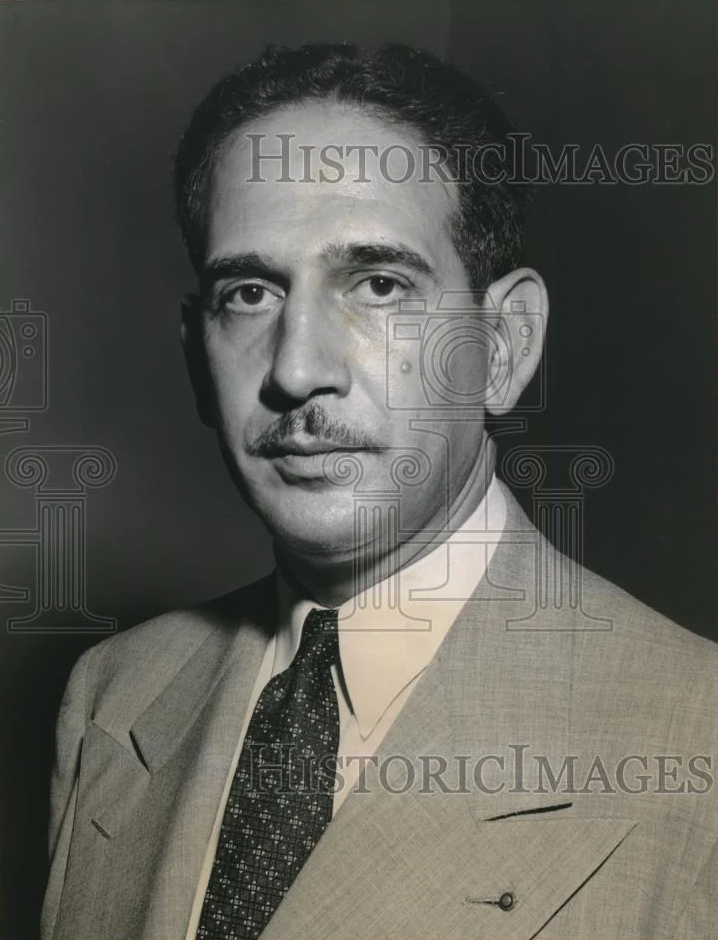
Impellitteri as a candidate for New York Supreme Court, 1943

Following his admission to the bar, he worked in private practice alongside influential Democratic attorney Martin Thomas Conboy Jr. He served as a state Assistant District Attorney from 1929 to 1938. After returning to private practice for three years as a specialist in criminal law, he served as legal secretary to New York Supreme Court Justice Peter Schmuck, later moving to the chambers of Joseph A. Gavagan in an analogous role. He was reportedly a close associate of gangster Tommy Lucchese, who helped Impellitteri's rise in politics. On the other hand, a report in the New York World-Telegram indicated that Impelliteri opposed organized crime and corruption and had failed to rise through the city Democratic Party's ranks because he had "the injudicious good taste to snub Frank Costello", the gambler and racketeer who was said to control the Tammany Hall organization behind the scenes.

In 1945, Mayor William O'Dwyer picked Impellitteri to run for President of the City Council on the Tammany Hall slate. He ran on the Democratic and American Labor Party lines in 1945, but when he was up for reelection in 1949, he ran on the Democratic Party line alone.

According to journalist Robert Caro, Impelliteri was drafted into his first elected role by Democratic Party leadership, who selected his name from a municipal employee directory. The party was seeking an Italian American Manhattan resident to bring balance to the citywide ticket and thought an employee in his position would be easy to persuade on political matters.

== Mayor of New York City ==
On August 31, 1950, O'Dwyer, pursued by both federal and state investigators, was suddenly appointed by President Harry S. Truman as United States ambassador to Mexico, where he would be beyond the reach of officials who wanted his public testimony in several matters on which he preferred not to speak. Under the City Charter of the era, City Council President Impellitteri became acting mayor upon O'Dwyer's resignation. The Tammany Hall bosses determined that Impellitteri was unsuitable for the role and refused to nominate him as the Democratic candidate for the special election in November 1950; instead, highly regarded New York State Supreme Court Judge Ferdinand Pecora, who was also given the Liberal Party line, ran as the nominee. Impellitteri ignored the machine and ran independently under the new "Experience Party" banner. He also popularized the slogan "unbought and unbossed" during his 1950 campaign.

Impellitteri was the first mayor since the consolidation of greater New York in 1898 who was elected without a major party's ballot line, and his election was a populist uprising against the political system. The results were:

- Vincent Impellitteri (Experience Party) 1,161,175 votes
- Ferdinand Pecora (Democratic/Liberal) 935,351
- Edward Corsi (Republican) 382,372
- Paul L. Ross (American Labor) 147,578

Impellitteri's inauguration, held on November 14, 1950, absent either a band or a platform, was swift and straightforward. Outside City Hall, he pledged to "do my level best to justify the confidence you have reposed in me."

Shortly after Impellitteri's succession, the Kings County District Attorney arrested bookmaker Harry Gross in September 1950 as part of a corruption investigation that caused nearly 500 police officers of all ranks to resign, retire, or be fired. Impellitteri opposed the corruption, vigorously supporting the Brooklyn District Attorney, Miles McDonald, and firing anyone in his administration associated with former Mayor William O'Dwyer.

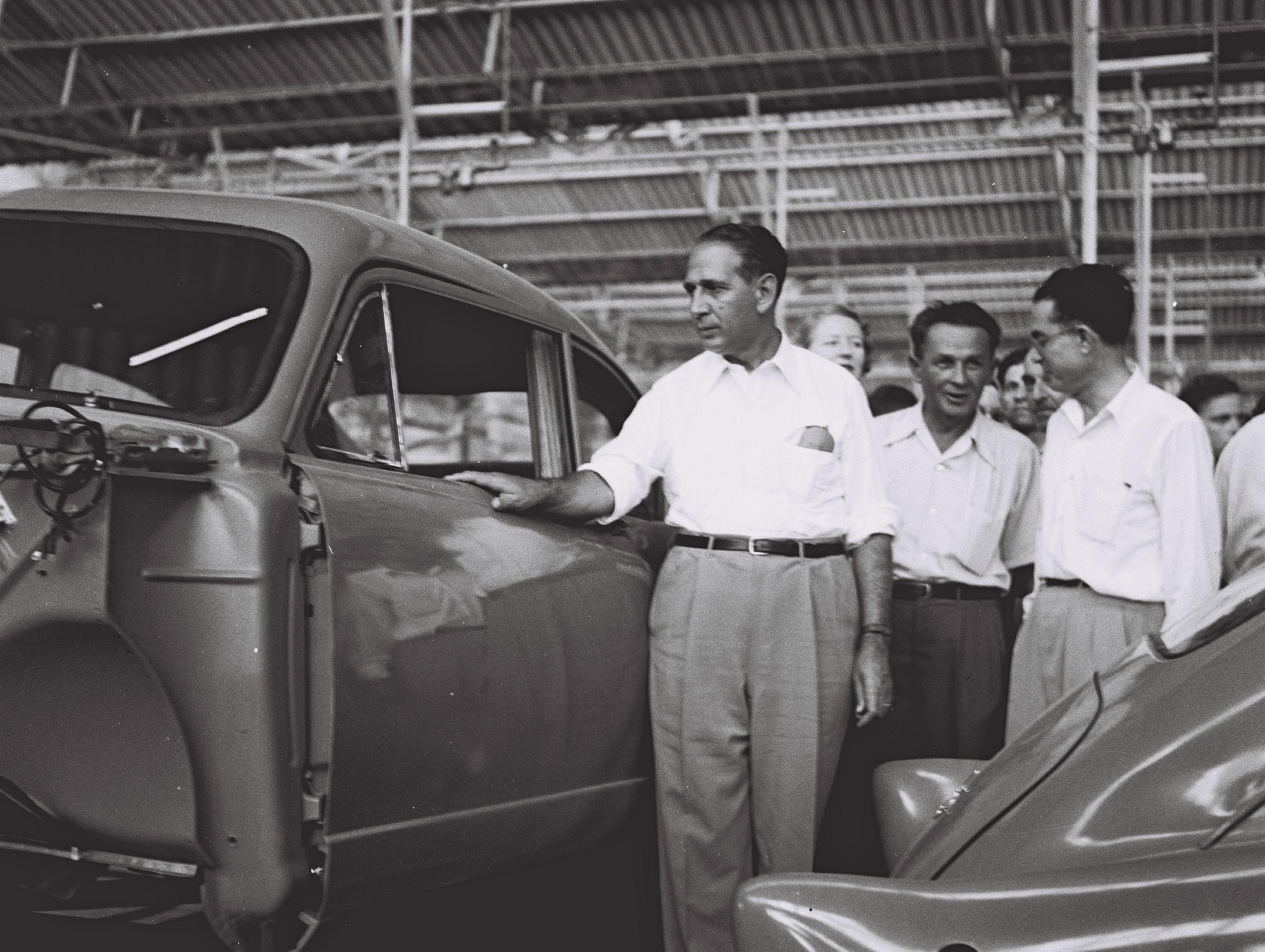
Impellitteri visits a car factory in Haifa, Israel, 1952

Impellitteri is credited with trying to rein in the budget, raising the bus and subway fare to fifteen cents, establishing parking meters on city streets for enhanced revenue, and increasing the sales tax. He aspired to be a new light in city politics, but his administration met with some resistance from the established order. At the time, Robert Moses wielded significant influence; according to Robert Caro (in his Moses biography The Power Broker), Impellitteri deferred to Moses on all matters of appointments and policy and is described as a puppet on Robert Moses' strings. The Italian author Carlo Levi documented the mayor's 1950 visit to his birthplace in Sicily.

Impellitteri ran for a full term in 1953. He was defeated in the Democratic primary by then Manhattan Borough President Robert F. Wagner, Jr. Although New York City Comptroller Lazarus Joseph usually sided in the New York City Board of Estimate with Impellitteri during the latter's term in office, Joseph supported Wagner for the Democratic nomination.

== Later career and retirement ==
After becoming mayor, Wagner appointed Impellitteri a New York City Criminal Court judge. He retired from the bench in 1965. Following the death of his wife in 1967, he lived at the New York Athletic Club's City House on Central Park South. After he was diagnosed with Parkinson's disease in 1983, he maintained his Athletic Club residence but primarily resided in convalescent homes, most notably the Carolton Convalescent Hospital in Fairfield, Connecticut.

== Philanthropy ==
Impellitteri became a patron of The Lambs Club in 1949.

== Death and burial ==
He died of heart failure on January 29, 1987, at Bridgeport Hospital in Bridgeport, Connecticut. Impellitteri was buried at Mount Saint Peter Catholic Cemetery in Derby, Connecticut.

== See also ==
- List of mayors of New York City
- List of members of the American Legion

Political offices
Preceded by Newbold Morris	President of the New York City Council; 1946–1950	Succeeded by Joseph T. Sharkey
Preceded by William O'Dwyer	Mayor of New York City; 1950—1953	Succeeded by Robert F. Wagner Jr.
