= Vulcan Blazers =

African-American fraternal organization

- Understanding, Cooperation
- Type: Fraternal society
- Purpose: Represent the interests of African-American firefighters
- Headquarters: Baltimore, Maryland. United States
- Affiliations: IABPFF
- Website: www.vbibaltimore.org

The Vulcan Blazers, headquartered in Baltimore, Maryland, is an African-American fraternal organization representing more than 300 full-time professional fire fighters and paramedics. They are an advocacy organization which has been assisting African American Fire Fighters since 1970. Having formed an outreach with members of the Fire Fighting profession statewide, the membership is over 300 and still growing.

== Origins ==
Formed in 1970, it is affiliated with the IABPFF and became the first minority group to win a discrimination lawsuit over hiring in 1973. This increased the number of minorities in the Baltimore fire service subsequently paving the legal pathway for other organizations to follow. The purpose of the Vulcan Blazers is to service the community-at-large including social issues, schools, agencies, private and corporate entities and to mentor youth in fire service careers.

== History ==
African-Americans have been a part of the history of the Baltimore City Fire Department dating to Smokestack Hardy and the SHC Auxiliaries agitating the Mayor for them being made permanent and paid firemen in 1949. At the start of WWII firefighters enlisted en masse and the fire auxiliaries were utilized to fight fires in Baltimore. Hardy was the first certified as a firefighter and when the returning troops reclaimed the trucks, he continued to assist. Hardy was mustered out as too old for the army in 1943. In 1953, the first civil service class to include African-Americans was inducted into the fire academy. Many of the auxiliaries were over the age limits by the time of that first class but Charles Miller, Charles L. Scott and Roy Parker went on to serve as full firefighters for the city of Baltimore. In the first class of Auxiliaries to be paid were Lee D. Babb, Cicero Baldwin, Ernest H. Barnes, Louis Harden, Earl C. Jones, Carl E. McDonald, George C.W. McKnight Jr., Charles T. Miller, Roy Parker, Charles L. Scott and Lindsay Washington. Scott scored no.1 on the civil service list to be hired, out of 48 taking and passing the civil service exam and physical. Hardy and the auxiliaries continued to respond to forth alarms, setting up ladders and assisting the firefighters. Until then, the Fire Department had been described by the black auxiliaries as a "private club" for white males only. The reality for the new firefighters was bleak, blacks were admitted to the Fire Department but they had to deal with segregated beds, toilets and washrooms. In many cases they were not allowed to use the same kitchen spoons or mugs, drink coffee from the coffeepot or read the newspapers bought by 'community chest' funds. Some firehouses had "Reserved" (for Colored People) signs over tables in the kitchens, on beds and a commode. It wasn't just in Baltimore that these incidents took place, but it was a consistent theme wherever blacks were integrated into firehouse life. In 1954, Firefighter Jack Johnson becomes the first to receive the fire departments Meritorious Service Award. In 1959, the first black promoted to the rank of Engine Engineer, Herman Williams, was not allowed to operate the apparatus to a fire. He was later promoted to Chief of the BCFD by Mayor Curt Schmoke in 1992. 1960 saw the first black to be promoted to Lieutenant, James Thomas had earlier achieved the rank of Fire Pump Operator. In the BCFD, Blacks were not allowed join the local union until eight years after they broke the color line. With the full union membership of local 734 set against inducting African-Americans, plus the departmental rules stipulated that you couldn't have any other representation than local 734, blacks determined that they would have representation. As social associations were allowed, The Social Association of Fire Fighters (SAFF) began as firefighters meeting at the house of James Crockett, a member of the third fire class. The SAFF, led by Charles R. Thomas visited the Vulcan Society in NYC who counseled legal action; subsequently, with the help of the law firm Brown Allen and Watts, Labor Leader A. Philip Randolph, The NAACP, The Urban League and some white supporters, the AFL-CIO forced the Local 734 Union to bring the "Negro Issue" to the floor of a general membership meeting. Blacks were denied membership in the Union until 1961 and were allowed to join only after the Union charged them a 'fee' to get in. These 'fees' later were litigated and found constitutional. In 2003 seven of the last remaining recruits who served at 36 Engine House on Edmondson Avenue got together to remember the firehouse as a place where history was made. It used to be the city's fire training school and it was where 10 men broke the color line to become Baltimore's first African-American firefighters. The only member of the 3rd class of black recruits not there on that day was Chief Herman Williams. All had been members of the Vulcan blazers, the incorporated successor to the SAFF. The city officially renamed Engine Company 36 on Edmondson Avenue and Bentalou Street - where for 22 years Thomas served in uniform - the Charles R. Thomas Sr. Engine Company. It is the third city firehouse named after a black firefighter and the second after a Vulcan Blazer. In 2015 the City Council of Baltimore passed resolutions CR-7573 thru CR-7587 thanking these black firefighters for their service to the city and cited their membership in the Vulcan Blazers with the following proclamations - CR 7575 President Dixon, All Members A City Council RESOLUTION congratulating Charles L. Scott(among others) on being one of the 1st African American Fireman(men) to serve the residents of Baltimore City and the Vulcan Blazers. The city Council had previously in 2007 recognized the Vulcans with a resolution congratulating them on 35 years of service to the city - CR 1552 President Dixon, All Members A City Council RESOLUTION congratulating Vulcan Blazers, Inc. on the celebration of its 35 Anniversary.

== IABPFF ==
In 1969 minority firefighters from all over the country went to NYC to attend the inaugural meeting of the International Association of Black Professional Firefighters. The following year in Hartford, Connecticut at the first IABPFF convention the SAFF leaders were present and were instrumental in forming that organization; when they returned to Baltimore they incorporated as the Vulcan Blazers. The first order of business was to find a legal team to fight the harassment they experienced in the firehouses along with the discriminatory promotion practices of the BFCD in court.

In 1971 four members of the Vulcan Blazers, supported by the organization, brought a racial discrimination lawsuit in the Baltimore Federal Court against the BCFD. They alleged that the hiring and promotion practices of the department were discriminatory against black firefighters. The trial was seen as an important test of federal affirmative action policies As a result, promotions to the rank of Battalion Chief (17 of 44 promotions) and other titles was ordered halted until the diversity goals stipulated in the judges order were met. The federal court trial Judge, Joseph H.Young, found there was a pattern of racial discrimination in the city's Fire Department. He ordered affected African-American firefighters be given promotions after years of bias by BFCD against them. On conclusion of the lawsuit in the spring of 1973, the BCFD had appointed an African American Fire Chief and promoted several officers to all ranks as high as assistant chief.

== Tax exemption denied ==
In 1989 the association protested the Amusement Park tax being levied on the association by the city of Baltimore and state of Maryland after the Fraternal Hall was audited and found to have underpaid taxes on the gross receipts. The Appeals Court found for the City of Baltimore but after an audit by the federal tax authorities (IRS) the organization was granted protection under 501c5 of the tax code. The Blazers again applied for and was granted an exemption from the federal income tax requirement. The organization was found to be a "Labor, agricultural, or horticultural organization" within the allowances of 26 U.S.C. § 501(c)(5). Subsequently, it also was exempted from paying the State income tax requirement.

== Other notable Vulcan Blazers ==
In 2007, following disagreements over promotions made at the Fire Academy with the Chief of department, the Vulcan Blazers publicly called for his replacement by civil authorities. A trainee firefighter, Racheal M. Wilson, had died during a live burn exercise earlier in the year and the firefighters union was not happy with the way Chief Goodwin ran his executive staff appointments. With questions of safety and the appearance that the diverse classes were being subjected to harsher regimens than previous classes of all-white recruits the Blazers stood in front in calling for changes at the top. Immediately after the incident some training officers were disciplined and the head of the academy was replaced. Following accusations of cheating by black candidates on the 2007 exams for Lieutenant and Captain positions a Title VII lawsuit was filed and the firefighters union, a defendant along with the BFCD and the city, was dropped as a defendant before the case was consolidated by the Judge. The decision included statements made by Henry Burris, Pres of the Vulcan Blazers in the press alleging that the rumors that there had been cheating were racially motivated by white officers, the union and Chief Goodwin. In 2011 summary judgement dismissing those discrimination charges was granted, the final disposition indicated that because their earlier scores were lower these blacks could not have achieved the highest scores on the tests without cheating.

In December 2011 Lloyd Carter, the former head diversity officer of the BCFD sued the city on grounds of racial discrimination over his reassignment. Carter claims to have been subjected to un-warranted internal investigation and was suing on grounds of racial discrimination. He was supported in this suit by the Blazers who also complained to the U.S. Justice Department which rebuffed the request to join the suit. Carter was also a past president of the Vulcan Blazers organization and was turned down by the court. The Blazers have also sued over low minority hiring and systemic bias and a similar lawsuit filed by minority police officers in 2009 against the City of Baltimore resulted in a $4.3 million settlement over charges it had racially discriminatory practices. It was the largest Title VII settlement by a municipality, highlighting the lack of diversity in the hiring practices of the police and fire depts.

On November 14, 2014, Baltimore fire safety officer Lt. James Bethea died of smoke inhalation after falling through a floor at a vacant rowhouse adjacent to a fire scene. He was trapped for hours before an off-duty firefighter saw his car outside the now quieted fire and called for help. Lt. Bethea was a lifelong member of the Vulcan Blazers and active in the community. As a result of the LODD, department head Niles Ford said the BFCD would consider additional policy changes, including requiring that safety officers work in pairs. He was a member of the BFCD class of 1973 that resulted as ordered by the court to settle a discrimination lawsuit brought by the Vulcan Blazers alleging racial discrimination in hiring and promotion.

== Promotions ==
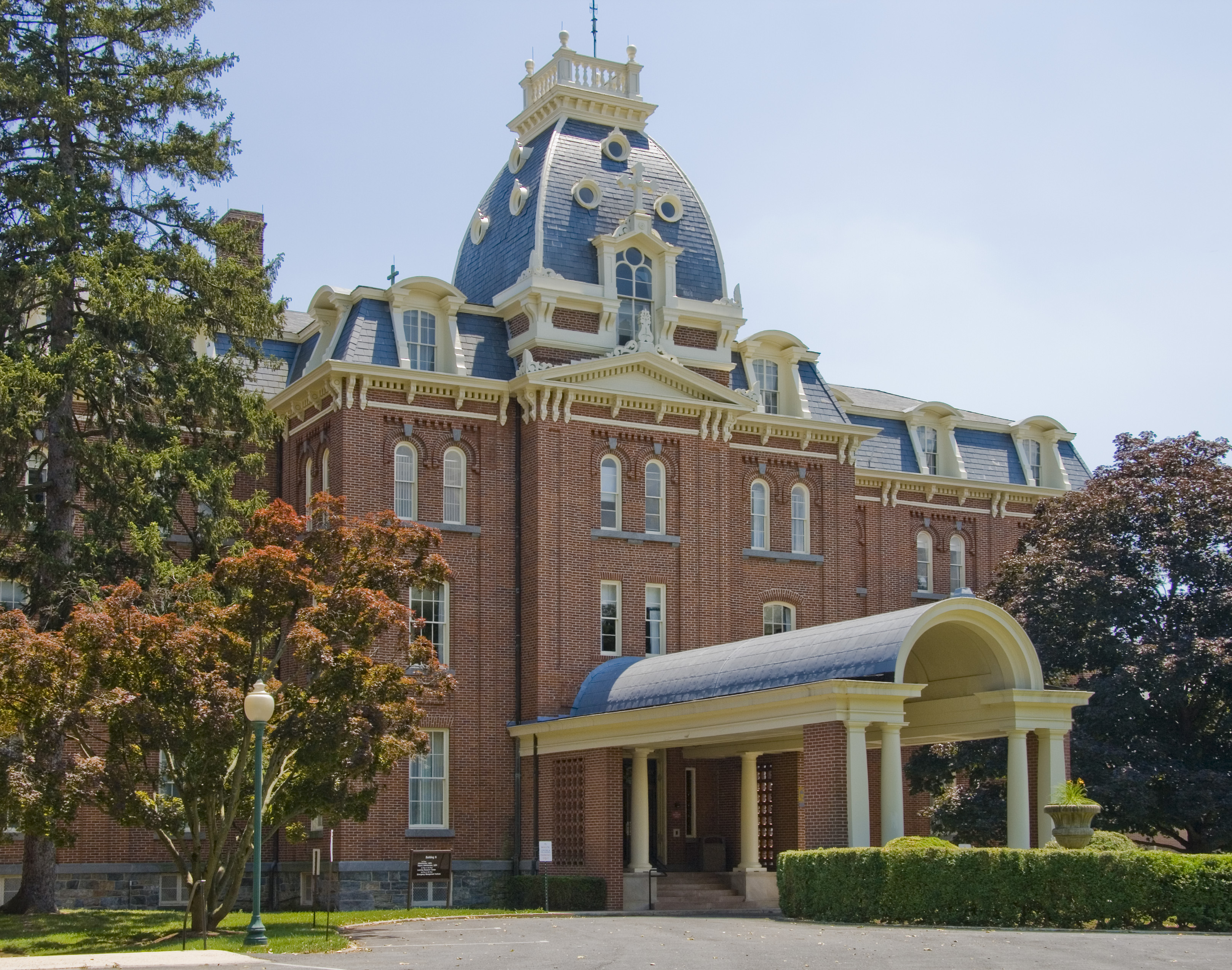
Burlando Building, National Fire Academy

In 2013 the BCFD promoted Captain Charline B. Stokes to Battalion Chief for Community Outreach. Stokes is the first African American female to attain the rank of Battalion Chief in the 154-year history of the Baltimore City Fire Department. Fire Chief Niles R. Ford, an African-American, is the current head of the BCFD. Recently, the department posted guidelines for a new physical test. For that, The IAFF(International Association of Fire Fighters) and IAFC(International Association of Fire Chiefs) got together with 10 leading fire departments and unions through the FEMA program "Fire Service Joint Labor Management Wellness/Fitness Initiative". Together, they came up with a new test called the "IAFF/IAFC Candidate Physical Ability Test" (CPAT).

Based on those changes they posted a new vision for the BCFD regarding diversity. "Communities are increasingly diverse and firefighters are continually challenged to operate in multi-cultural environments. The goal of the CPAT is to identify individuals who are physically qualified to perform the job of firefighter. At the same time, the CPAT seeks to eliminate artificial barriers to a fire department’s broader goal of developing a properly trained and physically capable workforce whose members reflect the diversity of the community. Diversity is also achieved by actively recruiting qualified men and women candidates from all racial and ethnic backgrounds for careers in the fire service."
