= The Valiants (firefighters) =

The Valiants of Philadelphia is a fraternal society of Black and Latino firefighters in Pennsylvania, with the mission of encouraging urban youth to pursue public safety careers and promoting public safety and fire prevention through education.

Formed in 1962, the organization is a founding member of the International Association of Black Professional Firefighters. This organization addresses the issue of racial discrimination faced by African-American firefighters in the United States.

The Valiants is descended from the Vulcan Society of the Fire Department of New York, a fraternal order of black firefighters organized in 1940 to promote diversity and aid minority recruitment to the ranks of civil servants.

== History ==
Philadelphia Fire Lieutenant Samuel Singleton organized the Valiants in March 1962, as a counterpart to other "fraternals" recognized by the Philadelphia Fire Department, such as the Sons of Italy, "The Lambskins" (Masons), "The League of Sacred Heart", and "The Shomrim" Society. These were typically organized around religious or ethnic affinities, and did not welcome blacks.

The Philadelphia Fire Department had had African-American firefighters since 1886, but fire companies were segregated (though with white officers in the black companies) until 1952. Before 1952, there were only two black fire companies. After 1952, African-Americans began entering the Philadelphia Fire Department in greater numbers, but integration often resulted in racial animosity and tension.

The Valiants originally formed to hold dinners and bring their families together. Al Means and Howard Rhone were the first co-presidents. Realizing they had more to do, the Valiants began reaching out to the younger recruits, performing fire prevention outreach to the minority community and volunteering at charity functions.

== Formation of International Association of Black Professional Firefighters ==
Along with the Vulcan Society of New York City, the Phoenix Society of Hartford, the Vulcans of Hudson County, New Jersey, and the Vulcans of New Jersey, the Valiants participated in a 1969 conference in New York City, which led to the formation of the International Association of Black Professional Firefighters in 1970. This group aimed to combat the racism which was endemic within American fire services, and increase minority recruitment efforts and hiring.

Charles Hendricks, the Valiants' first treasurer, became the International Association of Black Professional Firefighters' treasurer. Valiant William Brogden was selected first recording secretary, and Valiant Ron Lewis served as regional head for of the Northeast.

As of 2017, the Valiants are the largest group in the 8,000-strong International Association of Black Professional Firefighters.

== Consent decree ==
In 1973 a brief study of hiring and promotional practices performed by the City of Philadelphia revealed a pattern of discrimination. The Valiants filed lawsuits to change the hiring practices of the Philadelphia Fire Department, which led to a consent decree in 1975, under which the department operated until the decree was stayed by a court in 2011, a total of 36 years. Under the decree, the department undertook to promote more black firemen to the upper ranks, and to increase recruitment and hiring of minorities. By 2011, when the consent decree was stayed, Derrick Sawyer, an African-American, was leading the 2,100-strong department as Fire Commissioner.

The Valiants continue to monitor hiring of firefighters and EMS personnel. In 2011, the group brought a discrimination lawsuit against the firefighters' union International Association of Fire Fighters or IAFF, and the City of Philadelphia, alleging persistent discrimination and fostering of a "hostile work environment". The lawsuit was settled, with black firefighters gaining greater participation in IAFF Local 22 activities, and the ability to run for office in the union.

== Promotions ==
Members of the Valiants have risen through the ranks and have attained promotions to the upper echelons of the Fire Department. The first African-American Fire Commissioner of the City of Philadelphia was Harold B. Hairston, a member of the Valiants and the International Association of Black Professional Firefighters.

Fire Commissioner Lloyd Ayers served as President and also Director of the Northeast Region of the International Association of Black Professional Firefighters. In 1984, Deputy Commissioner Donald Patton was the first African-American to achieve that distinction. He also served as President of the Valiants. A scholarship in his name is awarded each year by the organization to a student as a memorial to the Deputy Commissioner, who was passionate about education.

Among other Valiants who excelled were Deputy Chief Al Nelson; Battalion Chiefs Earnest Hargett Jr. and Norman Ray; Captain Clarence Brogden; Lieutenants Lisa Forrest, Berry Hutchins, Eric Johnson, Larry Clark, and Eric Stukes; and the Valiants' founding member, Charles Hendricks.

== City Council proclamation ==
In 2013, on the occasion of the fiftieth anniversary of the Valiants, the City Council of the City of Philadelphia adopted a resolution honoring them for 50 years of work for racial justice.

== Documentaries ==
- "Valiants, Inc." Chandra Jones 2013 Silver Award Philafilm Festival
- "Clarence Brogden" Mike Feagans 2008 Philadelphia Stories
- "Waldo Gentry - Being Detailed from Engine 11" Mike Feagans 2008 Philadelphia Stories

== See also ==
- Boston Society of Vulcans
- International Association of Black Professional Firefighters
- Vulcan Society
