= Arthur "Smokestack" Hardy =

Collector of African American fire arcana (1901–1995)

Smokestack Hardy
- Born: April 2, 1901; Baltimore, Maryland, United States
- Died: December 4, 1995 (aged 94)

Arthur "Smokestack" Hardy (April 2, 1901 – December 4, 1995) was a volunteer fire fighter, photographer, black fire historian and collector of fire memorabilia (fire buff). He was the first African-American firefighter in Baltimore, Maryland. There is a museum of his collection of fire related artifacts in West Baltimore curated by Guy Cephas, a fellow Retired Auxiliary firefighter. Baltimore has named one of their fire stations after him.

== Early life and career ==
At the age of three, Hardy witnessed the Great Baltimore Fire in 1904 from the roof of his grandmother's house and it profoundly influenced his life. As a child, he would run alongside the fire engines with their short black smokestacks on top, which caused the firemen to nickname the youth and fire buff "Smokestack". The advent of World War II caused a shortage of firemen in Baltimore and brought about the integration of the Baltimore Fire Department. Hardy joined the first fifteen recruits to the Auxiliary fire dept and became the first African American fireman certified in Baltimore in 1942. The Civil Defense provided training to the black volunteers and they were assigned throughout the city to assist the firemen on runs. He served in the Army during World War II for six months until he was honorably discharged in 1943 because he was overage. He later worked as a janitor at the Johns Hopkins University.

In 1949, he formed the SHC Fire Buff Club, for Smith, Hardy and Carter – Brothers in Arms and fellow fire buffs who advocated for paid auxiliary service. Hardy was the last surviving member of the trio. The first 10 paid black firefighters were hired in 1953 from a Civil Service exam. Integration was not easy for these early recruits, they shared the same 2 beds at the firehouse, brought their own utensils for use in the kitchen, did not share in the activities of the white firefighters as was the case in other cities during the era of civil rights. More classes with black probies followed and this added to the number of black firefighters. Mostly, he followed his passion and with pass cards issued by many different fire depts, crossed fire lines to photograph fire scenes. The auxiliaries were sanctioned by the fire dept and had a working replica of a call board, when a third alarm was called they would assist, setting up ladders and directly assisting in fighting fires.

== The collection ==
The museum began as the front room of Cephas's home.

Smokestack was unique in that he was voracious in his appetite for fire arcana, especially black fire memorabilia. He wrote to people all over the country then around the world. Everyone in fire service knew him and received his missives. Mostly his inquiries were to find out where the black firefighters were. He was prolific, and dated all of the replies he got in return, amassing a collection of letters that filled black binders in his home in West Baltimore on McCulloh Street. He allegedly knew every black fire chief in the country and he followed the careers of firemen in over 500 cities. A new book on firefighters integration struggles mentions one such letter, sent to then Battalion Chief Wesley Williams of the FDNY Vulcan Society in 1941. Another fire buff, Mike Legeros, reserved a section in his online history of black firefighters for Smokestack and his ring in, the system he used to acknowledge a return correspondence (m-d-y). He had seen the history of firefighting go from horse-drawn steam equipment to motorized vehicles and when the IABPFF was formed he was called on as the foremost historical authority on black firefighters. He filled his house with the items that firemen sent him until there was no room for a visiting reporter to sit during an interview. Documentaries were produced in which he played a major part. Twice he was a featured article in Ebony and in 1954 the Negro History Bulletin by Carter G. Woodson called him "A Real American Fire Fan". When he died, he was considered one of the greatest fire buffs in America, and the Baltimore fire dept named a fire house after him. In 2004 the renamed The Arthur "Smokestack" Hardy Station of Engine Company No. 13 and Truck Company No. 16 on McMechen Street was dedicated. After he died, He passed the care of his collection to a new generation of fire buffs in the person of Guy Cephas, an auxiliary firefighter who mentored over at Fire Station No. 36 by Hardy and other firefighters. Along with a board of directors Cephas hosts the modest museum which opens 2 days each week and by request.

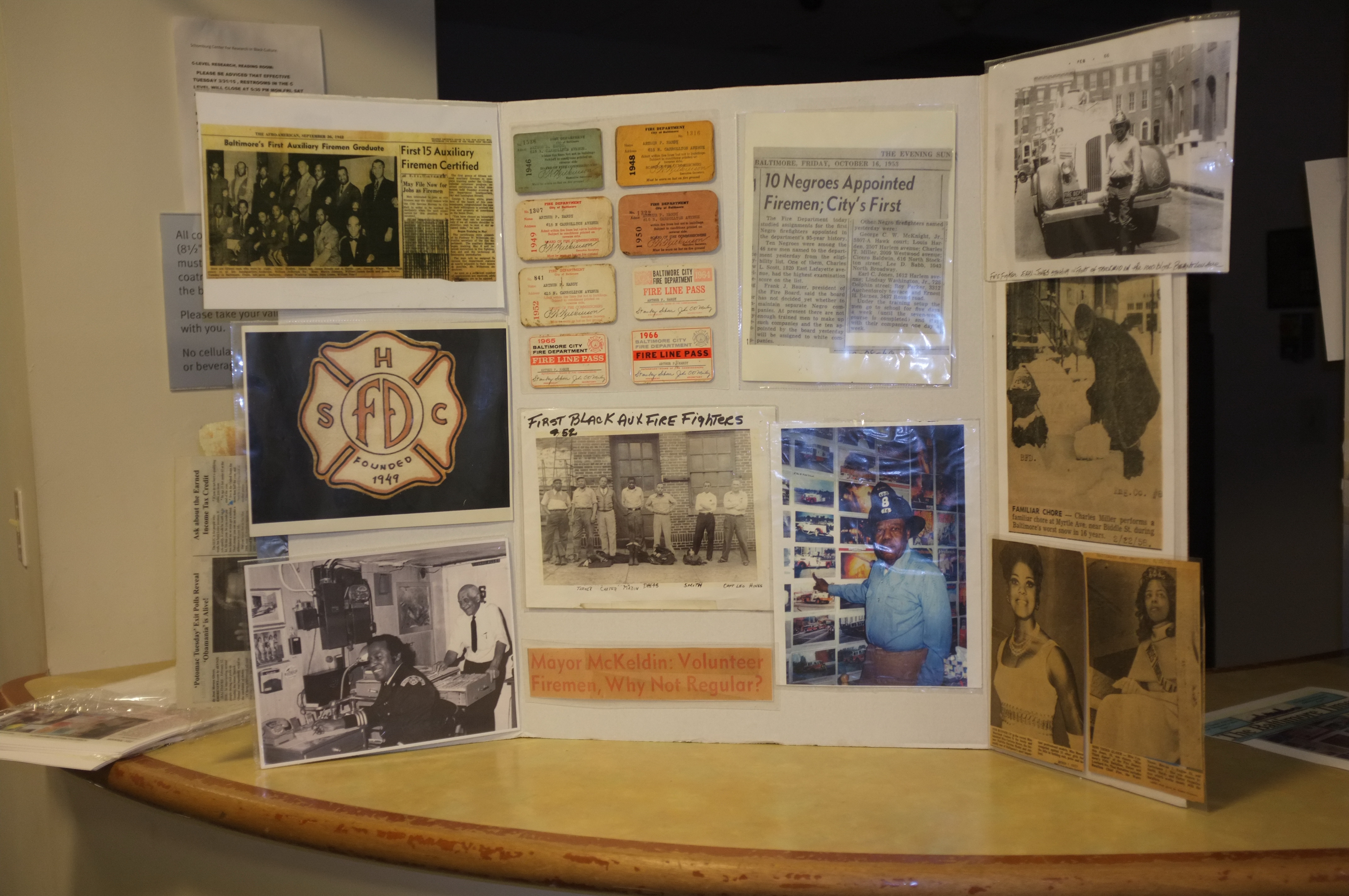
A collage of prints and images of the African American Fire Museum in Baltimore, Maryland

== Arthur "Smokestack" Hardy Fire Museum ==
Cephas is currently working with the Baltimore City Council to find a space to move the cramped storefront museum to and is seeking grants to fund the move.

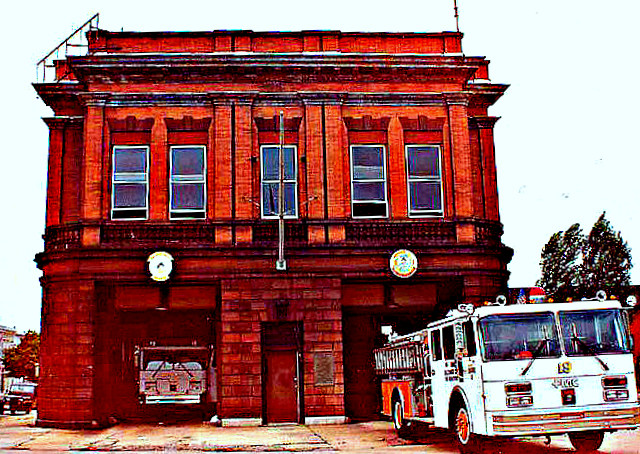
E.Oliver St BCFD

On January 29, 2015, the Baltimore Housing department set the stage for the museum's preferred location by awarding the RFP(request for proposal) to renovate 1220 E. Oliver Street to the African American Firefighters Association for "a firehouse of significant importance in the Oliver neighborhood". Should funding be secured, the association has plans to create a working museum and reclaim the blighted property. Over the years elementary school groups, clubs and churches have visited the current location and Cephas envisions an expanded museum to allow him to display many of the artifacts he has in storage. The collection of museum quality artifacts include an alarm gong, call boxes, signs, hoses, photographs, fire engines models, lanterns, bells, and water buckets. Copies of newspaper articles, photo prints, helmets, badges, calendars, correspondence and fire patches from departments all over the world round out the collection.

As of September 30, 2019, the collection resides with the Fire Museum of Maryland. Funding is being sought for cataloging and digitizing the collection to make it available and searchable on the internet. The Fire Museum of Maryland was established in 1971 and is located at 1300 York Road in Lutherville, Maryland.
