= Lloyd Carter =

American lacrosse coach and retired firefighter

Lloyd Carter (born 1959) is a coach, retired firefighter and former Head Diversity Officer, BCFD; and former president of the Vulcan Blazers, a black fraternal organization of firefighters in Baltimore, Maryland. He recently was made head coach of the Hampton University Lacrosse team which is now Division I. This is the only team playing in Division 1 at a HBCU. He is a retired chief from the Baltimore City Fire Department and is also retired from the military reserve.

== History ==
Carter served in the Army reserve and Maryland National Guard, became a firefighter in 1983 and moved through the ranks, retiring as a Deputy Chief from the BFCD when his position and division was cut by Baltimore Mayor Stephanie Rawlings-Blake's budget for 2013. He had previously been president of the Vulcan Blazers, a black fraternal order of firefighters that fought the fire department to diversify the ranks of the fire department of the 65% black city. He had filed suit in federal court alleging that the elimination of his position as head diversity officer was racially motivated, however, the claims were turned down by the court. Coach Carter, the men's lacrosse coach at Hampton University, played Division II lacrosse at Morgan State, which dropped the sport in 1981.

== Division II player ==
As one of the attackmen for Morgan State's division II lacrosse team, LAX was unique at the historically black college and on May 6, 1981, the MS Bears lost to Loyola of Baltimore in their last match. He graduated, becoming chief of Emergency Medical Services in Baltimore, and coached high school lacrosse. In 2001, Carter founded a lacrosse organization named Blax Lax to bring in more African-Americans to the sport. In 2011, he helped to organize a lacrosse club at Hampton University. Suddenly, in May 2015, Hampton U announced it was elevating lacrosse to varsity status. They chose Carter to be head coach. While Hampton is not the first HBCU to fund lacrosse, it's the first to do so on the Division I level. Lacrosse is the fastest growing team sport in the United States in 2019, with lack of funds to expand the biggest hurdle it faces, as expounded by US Lacrosse.

Michael Crawford had come up with the idea of starting a club program of lacrosse at Hampton but died before he could realize his dream. His mother, Verina, was determined to see her son's vision come true, and soon contacted Carter through the internet. He commuted the 4 hours to Hampton from his home in Baltimore for 2 years and it was this commitment and leadership that was one of the main reasons Hampton officials hired him. In Maryland, where lacrosse is the "Official State Sport", no black college had the sport competing at the NCAA level.

After four years as head coach at Hampton U. in 2019 Coach Carter announced his retirement to take place at the end of the school year. 2018 saw his Pirates winning 5 games and setting goal records.

== See also ==
- International Association of Black Professional Firefighters
- Vulcan Blazers
