= Harold Hairston =

Harold Hairston may refer to:

- Happy Hairston (Harold Hairston, 1942–2001), American basketball player
- Harold Hairston (baseball) ( 1922–1998), American Negro league pitcher
- Harold B. Hairston (1939–2016), Philadelphia fire commissioner
