= William H. Nicholson =

William H. Nicholson (1869–1912) was the first African American fireman in the New York City Fire Department.

== Biography ==
Nicholson was born in 1869 in Virginia. He migrated to New York City and worked as a cement tester. He joined the New York City Fire Department in Brooklyn in 1898 but due to "rank-and-file opposition" was detailed to the veterinary unit to feed the horses and shovel manure. However, he was allowed to appear in public as a firefighter every Fourth of July when the department mandated every able-bodied man work the streets.

Nicholson retired due to poor health in December 1911 and died the following January.

== See also ==
- Wesley Augustus Williams —Third African American fireman in the New York City Fire Department
- Vulcan Society
