= The Valiants =

The Valiants may refer to:

- Port Vale F.C., nicknamed The Valiants, an English football club
- Vince Vance & The Valiants, an American country pop group
- The Valiants, a 1950s group who recorded the first released version of "Good Golly Miss Molly"
- The Valiants (firefighters), a community-based, non-profit organization of Black and Latino firefighters in Pennsylvania.
