= Wesley Williams =

Wesley Williams may refer to:

- Wesley Augustus Williams (1897–1984), New York City firefighter
- Wesley S. Williams Jr. (born 1942), American lawyer and Anglican priest
- Wesley "Wes" Williams (born 1968), Canadian rapper, record producer, actor, and author better known as Maestro Fresh Wes
- Wesley Williams (American football) (born 2004), American football player for the Jacksonville Jaguars
- Wesley "Moto42" Williams, the author of SCP-173
