= San Francisco Black Firefighters Association =

American professional organisation

The San Francisco Black Firefighters Association (SFBFA) was founded in 1972.

== San Francisco Fire Dept ==
The Black Firefighters Associations (BFA) is affiliated with the International Association of Black Professional Firefighters (IABPFF). The SFBFA was formed as a result of issues concerning Black Americans and other minority members of the Fire Department. After the riots of 1968, an effort to coordinate the response of the fire services, especially minority firefighters, began to merge. In 1969, the IABPFF formed, a national organization of black fire professionals who felt that active recruitment of youth to jobs in fire service would lead to a solution in fire prevention and end the repeat of long hot summers when inner cities caught fire.

Firefighter Kevin Smith, SFBFA president in 2011, said "As an organization, we strive to prepare our members for the unexpected, to learn their craft, advance their careers, and protect and serve the communities in which we work. This is a monumental task that we are committed to successfully achieving. We meet this challenge everyday by demanding job related promotional examinations, fighting for diverse entry level hiring, highlighting the need for job specific training, and participating in the youth development for the future of our city." He had previously complained about the bias in the testing process that unfairly excluded blacks and other minorities. In 2018, a black firefighter on fire fuel inspections was reported to the police as 'suspicious'. As a result, the Black Firefighters Association sent emails to it members discussing the incident and racial profiling. Also, as a result of black male under-representation in the upper ranks of the SFD, when the current fire chief was selected the BFA did not support the choice.

== Youth Academy ==
The San Francisco BFA contributes to the community by operating a Youth Academy. Participating young people receive instruction of first aid, CPR, and various firefighting skills, and learn life skills including financial literacy health and wellness, nutrition and home economics.
