= Fire buff =

Firefighting and rescue enthusiast

A fire buff is a person with considerable interest (a fan) in fire fighting and emergency services, while not being an active member of these services. Fire buffs may collect or promote information about the local emergency services, raise money for them, or attend emergencies as bystanders. In the latter case, a fire buff may be considered a nuisance or even a danger to operations by active service members. Many fire buffs are organized in associations, a small number of which are integrated into auxiliary services for their local fire stations. The term 'fire buff' is said to go back to the beginning of the 20th century, when early fire buffs attended emergencies during winter time wearing fur coats, thus coming to be called "buffalos".

== Notable buffs ==
- Arthur Fiedler, conductor of the Boston Pops Orchestra
- Arthur "Smokestack" Hardy, volunteer fire fighter and black fire historian
- Robert S. Tucker, government official, businessman, and philanthropist
- Rube Waddell, baseball player

== See also ==
- Fire photography
