= Boston Society of Vulcans =

Non-profit organization

Founded in 1969, the Boston Society of Vulcans of Massachusetts is a community-based, non-profit organization of Black and Latino firefighters in Boston. Their mission is to encourage urban Bostonians to pursue public safety careers. They also promote public safety and fire prevention through education programs and various other resources. The Boston Society of Vulcans is a member of the International Association of Black Professional Firefighters, an association formed in 1969 in New York City to address the larger issue of racial discrimination faced by African-American firefighters nationwide. The Boston Society of Vulcans descended from the Vulcan Society of the FDNY, a black fraternal order of firefighters organized in 1940 to promote diversity and aid minority recruitment to the ranks of civil servants.

== Consent decree ==
In 1970, a lawsuit was brought against the Massachusetts Civil Service Commission that “alleged that the municipalities engaged in discriminatory recruitment and hiring practices whilst staffing their respective fire departments.” Blacks and Latinos were virtually excluded from the fire service, making up 0.9 percent of the total number of firefighters in Boston in 1970. This did not reflect the minority population of Boston, which was around 16 percent at the time. This lawsuit resulted in "the entry of an omnibus consent decree" that revised the hiring practices of municipalities, also referred to Boston Chapter, NAACP v. Beecher, 371 F.Supp. 507, 520-23. The decree was “affirmed” in Boston Chapter, NAACP, Inc. v. Beecher, 504 F.2d 1017, 1028 (1st Cir.1974) (Beecher II), cert. denied, 421 U.S. 910, 95 S.Ct. 1561, 43 L.Ed.2d 775 (1975). The Beecher decree has been redefined since the first Beecher decision in 1974 but has “remained the guiding principle governing the hiring of firefighters in much of Massachusetts.”

A. Recruitment

The fire department's Human Resource Department was tasked with recruiting minority candidates to take the entrance examination by distributing information to minority applicants through the media, schools, and community groups. This allowed for a more diverse group of applicants.

B. Examinations

Examinations must be pass/fail to produce a pool of qualified minority applicants. Federal Judge Wyzanski found that the public safety examinations overemphasized scholastic skills that were “set higher than what is required” for performance.” Also, future examinations were required to be validated under EEOC guidelines.

C. Certification Ratios

The Consent Decree mandated that minority and non-minority candidates be certified “one minority to every three non-minority to Boston and Springfield.” Also, the Civil Service Commission‘s lists must be in a specific order: near the head of the list were disabled veterans, children of public safety officers killed or injured in the line of duty, veterans, etc.

D. Appointment/ Reasons for Bypass

This requirement prevents appointing authority from hiring only non-minorities on the Human Resource Department's certified list unless an affirmative reason for bypass is presented. In other words, this ensures that candidates are bypassed only for job-related reasons as opposed to racial ones.

E. Parity

The Consent Degree requires that the percentage of Latino and Black fire officers be close to the number of Black and Latino individuals in the community, about 26 percent. In 1981, the number of minority firefighters reached 160, or about 14.7 of the total.

== Proposition 2 1/2 ==
All progress made through the court order was threatened by the passage of Proposition 2 1/2, a state tax reduction law mandating layoffs. The layoffs followed a last hired, first fired approach. The minority community argued that the Union's emphasis on seniority "meant that the Blacks who had been hired as a result of the Civil Rights Suit would have lost their jobs as a result of the 1981 layoffs." Proposition 2 1/2 was passed as a state tax reduction law that forced the city to reduce its budget and personnel numbers, resulting in severe cuts to the city's police, fire, and education departments. The US District Court Order was issued August 7, 1981 that required the department to maintain the 14.7 percent ratio. This led to a scenario where "white firemen with 10 years seniority were losing their jobs, while minorities with three years experience kept theirs." Due to budgetary restrictions imposed by Proposition 2 ½, 13 out of 74 fire companies were split up and 3 of 37 fire stations were closed. Mayor Kevin White declared that two hundred layoffs would be made in total, in a time span of about two weeks. Layoffs were said to be determined by seniority, but as a side effect reduced black firefighters from 237 to around 35 to 40. In 1982 the Tregor Bill granted the city of Boston money and called for the rehiring of firefighters who were laid off because of Proposition 2 ½.

== Reverse discrimination ==
In 2003, the ratio requirements were called off because it was said that racial parity had been reached. This was prompted by a "reverse discrimination" suit filed by white men Quinn and O'Brien, who argued that even though they had higher scores, minority candidates were hired over them. Opposition felt that there was no need for affirmative action practices because the goal of racial parity had been reached. The NAACP and the Vulcans countered that the percentages are not entirely accurate- for example, minorities such as female firefighters were still mistreated.

== Recruitment ==
The recruitment of blacks required a different perspective than that of non-minorities. Internal documents state "most ethnic groups recognize that civil service is a stepping stone to a Masters of Business Administration degree from Harvard in two or three generations". Black youth was to be convinced of the financial stability that came with a position in the fire service and that this stability led to Black power. The Vulcans defined recruitment as including the enrollment, training, preparation for tests, guidance and counsel throughout until the applicant becomes an employee." The Vulcans planned to utilize community agents and the spirit of community involvement in the recruitment of black youth. These agencies included The Neighborhood Youth Corps, churches, Urban League, community colleges, adult education programs, etc. They also included quasi employment agencies and government agencies in their recruitment efforts.

Recruitment required community wide involvement: creating and distributing posters, local clubs, black mass media outlets, visits to local schools, and gaining the support of local black professionals (teachers, advertisers, announcers, etc.). Tables were set up in the streets to "sell" the benefits of becoming a firefighter, as well as "community sponsored" street campaigns. Young recruiters were used to recruit people of the same age and peer group "person to person." Black college dropouts were targeted, offering them an opportunity to get a degree with the benefits of a full salary, a vested pension upon retirement, and promotion opportunities. The Vulcans implemented year round civil service training, a 10-week course for 2 hours per week that cost $15.

== Charitable and community outreach ==
The Vulcans instituted or participated in several programs that supported the organization's mission, such as education. The Society established a smoke detector program that educated people about the importance of having detectors in their homes and how to install them. The Vulcans would send firefighters to local schools to speak about fire safety. To support the organization as a whole, the Vulcans would host elaborate fundraising galas and award banquets, mentor programs, employment training, and held fundraising dances. Many events were used to create awareness of the organization in the community, such as setting up a booth at the Annual Boston Kite Festival. Events such as the annual Family Day Picnic focused on bringing together Boston firefighters and their families. On behalf of the firefighters Lloyd Phillips, Raymond Moss, and Robert Powell, the Lloyd Phillips Scholarship Fund was created in 1988 for kids from disadvantaged communities who planned to attend college. This scholarship still exists today.

== Racial inequality continues ==
The Boston Fire Department is still largely segregated. The current composition of firehouses largely depends on the neighborhood in which it is located. In the more affluent South End neighborhood, all 19 firefighters are white while in the rougher area of Hyde Park (Cleary Square) 38 of the 41 firefighters identify as minority. As of 2010, exactly 37 years after the court decree, one third of Boston firefighters are minorities. White firefighters were found to be positioned in the busiest fire units as opposed to minorities. In the busiest firehouses of Boston, 22% are minorities and 78% are white. Furthermore, 90 percent of firefighters hired since the consent decree ended in 2003 are more likely to be promoted than minorities.
