= Phoenix Society (firefighters) =

The Phoenix Society is a black fraternal organization of firefighters in the Hartford (Connecticut) Fire Department. The organization was founded in 1965.

== History ==
In 1965, five African-American firefighters, impressed with the gains made due to the work of the Vulcan Society, Inc. of New York City, conceived the idea of forming a branch of the Vulcan Society in Hartford. They met informally for the first time in October 1965. Later that year, they wrote to the President of the Vulcan Society, Lieutenant Vincent W. Julius. Julius replied, "the Vulcan Society would offer any advice, support and guidance that might be desired by the Hartford Firefighters."

The following year in March 1966, this group attended a meeting of the Vulcan Society, meeting with FDNY Commissioner Lowery, a past president and founding member of the New York organization. Ideas and suggestions were made available to the five visitors from Hartford, enabling them in a short time after returning home, to hold their own organizational meeting, thereby establishing the basis for the Phoenix Society.

At this meeting, goals and purposes were established to the mission of the new organization. It was concluded that this organization should help other firefighters toward promotional goals in the department, engender fundraising for persons needing aid and charitable organizations, create a scholarship fund for the benefit of children of firefighters and fostering a closer relationship and fellowship among all firefighters.

On creating the entity, the incorporating officers were:

- John B. Stewart Jr.* as President
- George B. Hayes — Treasurer
- Carl G. Booker Sr.* — 1st Vice President
- Frank Carter Sr.* — 2nd Vice President
- Cecil W. Alston* — Chaplin
- William Butler — Chairman, Trustees
- Nelson K. Carter Sr.* — Secretary

* Denotes originating member

The Phoenix Society was named a sponsoring organization of the first Conference of Black Professional Firefighters held in New York City in 1969. The Conference was called to address issues common to black firefighters and to work with brother Firefighters throughout the country in order to address issues like harassment, limited promotional opportunities and how to help make the Fire Service more professional.

Carl G. Booker Sr. conceived the name and emblem of the Society. It captured the image of the phoenix, an Egyptian bird which lived 500 years, after which it consumed itself in fire only to rise again as a young bird.

== Mission statement ==
The Phoenix Society felt then, as we do now, that the unique experience of the Black Firefighter has not changed over the years, and we will help to recruit and advance diversity training of the fire service whereas a person in search of a profession can feel free to take the tests and qualifying exams, and on passing walk into any firehouse, anywhere, and be accepted on their own merits — it will be only then that we can say that our American Dream has borne fruit.

-Unity Insures Longevity-

== IABPFF ==
The Phoenix Society in 1970 hosted the first National Convention of Black Professional Firefighters. That organization has grown since to over 181 chapters and 8100 heroes strong. The Society felt this to be the defining milestone reached by Black Firefighters at the time due to our effort to improve and advance the standards to the fire service throughout the country. The International Association of Black Professional Firefighters was named by Aaron O. West. At the first conference, the Constitution and the structure of the international was mapped out. The IABPFF should not be viewed as a Black separatist organization; its chapters are autonomous, as many union locals and city governments have failed to institute diversity plans in the testing, recruiting and the promotional process. It is therefore incumbent upon minority firefighters to press for the necessary reforms, and in due course of dealing with these problems, we expect to reduce the number of fire deaths and property loss in our respective communities, as well as increase the number of minorities and females in fire service jobs.

The Phoenix Society continues to strive toward a closer bond between the Fire Service and the Community it serves. From the preamble of the IABPFF; "Whereas we, Black firefighters, aware of the increasing complexity of our problems and those of our brothers with in the community, feel called upon to form an organization for the purpose of studying and solving such problems, in order to take our place in the vanguard of civilization, we hereby form ourselves into an organization for the purpose of cultivating and establishment of unity and brotherhood, also keeping alive the interest among retired members for the avowed purpose of improving the social status, and increasing professional efficiency."
