= Brenda Cowan =

American murder victim (1963–2004)

- Born: Brenda Denise Cowan; May 9, 1963; Sturgis, Kentucky, U.S.
- Died: February 13, 2004 (aged 40); Lexington, Kentucky, U.S.
- Cause of death: Shot
- Resting place: New Salem Baptist Cemetery; Union County, Kentucky, U.S.
- Education: University of Kentucky
- Occupations: Emergency medical technician (EMT) and firefighter

Brenda Denise Cowan (May 9, 1963 – February 13, 2004) was Lexington, Kentucky's first black female firefighter. According to Women in the Fire Service, Lieutenant Cowan is the first black female career firefighter ever to die in the line of duty. She had served with the Lexington Fire Department for twelve years. Cowan was the sister of Fred Cowan, a member of University of Kentucky's 1978 national championship basketball team.

== Early life ==
Cowan was born in Sturgis, Kentucky, the daughter of Ella Irene Dawson and the Reverend Tabb Frank Scott Cowan Sr., the minister at the city's New Salem Baptist Church. She had five siblings, Rev. Glenn Cowan, Linwood Cowan, Fred Cowan, Helen Cowan and Myrtle L. Cowan. She attended Union County High School where she played for the Bravettes basketball team. Cowan was named Most Valuable Player of the girls' basketball team in 1979 and 1981.

Cowan was single and had no children.

== Fatal line of duty shooting ==
On the first tour of duty after being formally promoted to Lieutenant, Cowan was shot and killed while responding to a domestic violence call. Cowan, an emergency medical technician (EMT) and firefighter assigned to Engine Company 18, was trying to help Fontaine Hutchinson, who had been shot in the head outside her rural south Lexington home. Fontaine Hutchinson died on the scene. Her husband, Patrick Hutchinson barricaded himself for nearly six hours in a house close to Interstate 75. I-75 was shut down for several hours during the standoff. Police said they used 15 rounds of tear gas to smoke Hutchinson out of the house. He was charged with two counts of murder. After entering a plea of guilty but mentally ill in 2009, he was sentenced to 25 years in prison.

In March 2005, Cowan's estate filed a lawsuit over her death. The lawsuit accused top Lexington-Fayette Urban County Government officials, 911 operators and emergency dispatchers of negligence. It sought compensation for Cowan's pain and suffering, wrongful death, loss of capacity to labor and earn income, right to future benefits, damages for loss of life and medical and funeral expenses.

== National and local response to death ==
Mayor Teresa Isaac proclaimed the day of her funeral service Red Ribbon Day. The Kentucky Senate held a moment of silence for Lt. Cowan, after a reading a memorial resolution. The International Association of Black Professional Firefighters presented the Cowan family with a medal of valor.

A "Homegoing Celebration" led by ten local pastors spoke of hope, and of faith that Lt. Cowan moved on to a better place. Fire Department Chaplain Stewart Dawson said, "His angels came down and loaded that sweet, sweet spirit that we know into their ambulance." After the service the American flag-draped coffin was lifted atop Engine 33 outside Consolidated Baptist Church. Across town a radio dispatcher read:

"This is the last call for Lt. Brenda Cowan, badge number 324. "She served the Lexington fire department from Nov. 3, 1992 to Feb. 13, 2004." He paused, then said, "may you rest in peace." There was a 21-gun salute. Cowan's body was escorted on a six-mile procession through Lexington. route

On August 12, 2019, the city of Lexington opened Brenda Cowan Elementary School in her honor.

== Legislative action ==
In March 2005, the Brenda D. Cowan Act, Senate Bill 217, unanimously passed the Kentucky Senate. The bill would amend KRS 508.025, relating to assault in the third degree, to provide that a person is guilty of assault in the third degree when he causes or attempts to cause physical injury to emergency medical services personnel, organized fire department members, and rescue squad personnel.
