= Harold B. Hairston =

African-American Fire Commissioner for the Philadelphia Fire Department

Harold B. Hairston ( December 8, 1939 - November 1, 2016) served as the first African-American Fire Commissioner for the Philadelphia Fire Department from 1992. Hairston was appointed head of the fire department by Mayor Ed Rendell and served until retirement in 2004. In his next life, Hairston worked for the CBS network Eyewitness News team as an expert on public safety and the Philadelphia Fire Department. He died at home in West Mount Airy on Tuesday, November 1, 2016. He was 76 years old. With his wife, Anne, Hairston had three children, and was married for 41 years.

== Early career ==
His career with the Philadelphia Fire Department (PFD) spanned 40 years. He joined the department in 1964 after three years in the Army. During that time he was assigned to the West Point Army Academy as a weapons instructor. After being one of the first blacks to integrate the PFD, he was promoted to Fire lieutenant in 1971 and captain in 1978. He made battalion chief in 1981 and went to deputy chief in 1986. Two citations for lifesaving rescues were awarded to his unit and the Metropolitan Fire Chiefs named him Fire Chief of the Year in 2003, and the National Fire and Burglar Alarm Association also named him Fire Official of the year in 2003.

== Consent decree ==
After contentious consent decrees were mandated on the PFD to correct previous discriminatory promotion practices, it was held in the black Philadelphia community that the position of Fire Commissioner would go to an African-American. Hairston was followed by Lloyd Ayers, an African-American, and the position was temporarily held by acting chief Derrick Saunders after Ayers retired. However, in 2016, newly elected Mayor Kenney replaced the Acting Fire Commissioner and native Philadelphian Derrick Sawyer with his own choice, breaking a 24-year tradition of native black Philadelphians being appointed to the position of fire chief of the 2,500 strong department.

Hairston served on various boards such as the American Red Cross of Southeastern Pennsylvania, the Delaware Valley Burn Foundation, the Police Athletic League, the Variety Club of the Delaware Valley and the Dad Vail Regatta, but the interest that continued long after his retirement was Fireman's Hall Museum, which has a tribute organized in his memory. He was also a member of The Valiants, a fraternal organization of black and Latino firefighters, and the IABPFF.

He is buried in Ivy Hill Cemetery, 1200 Easton Road, East Mount Airy.

== See also ==
- IABPFF
- The Valiants (firefighters)
