= Fire photography =

Photography genre

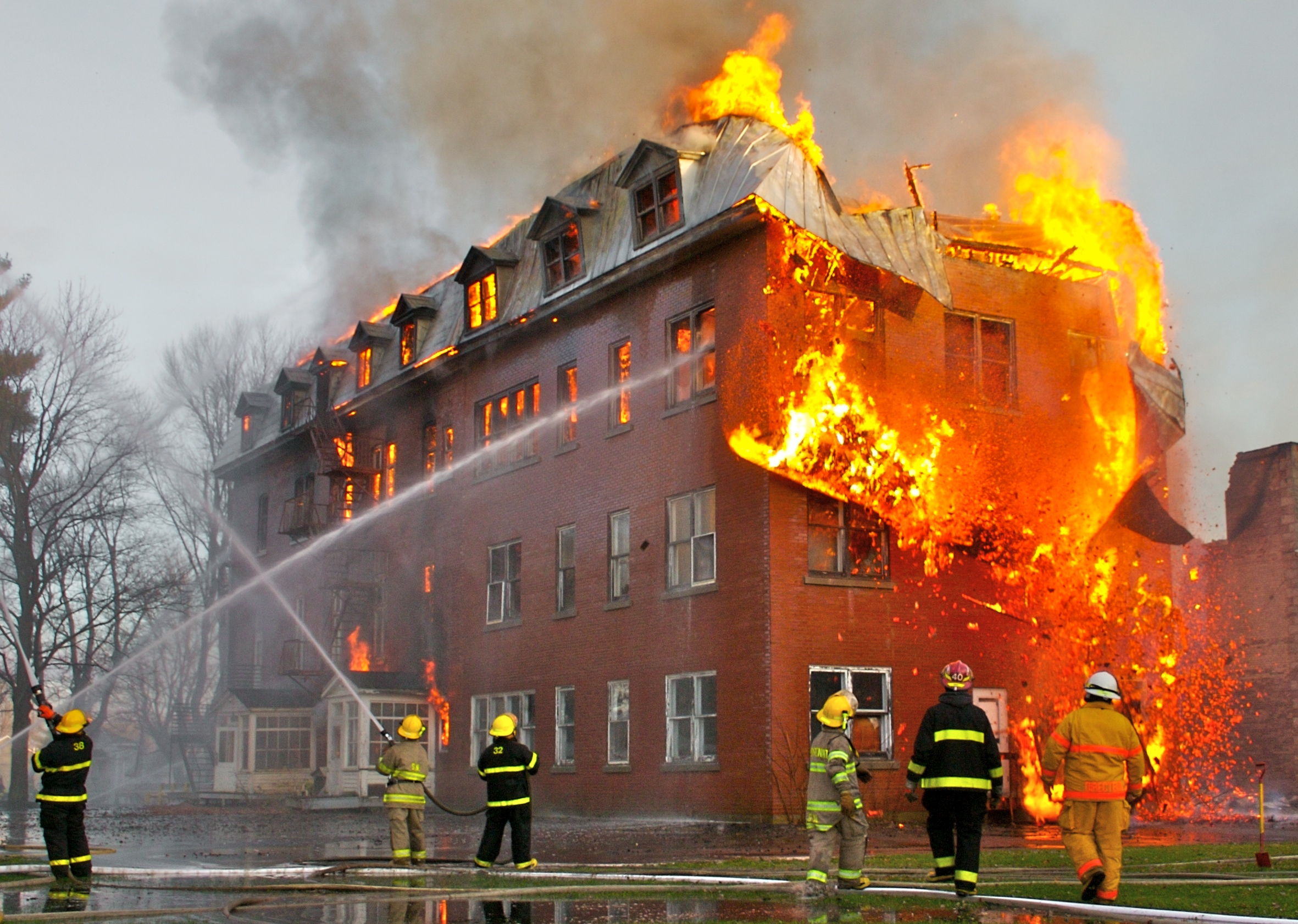
A photograph of a major fire

Fire photography is the act of taking photographs of firefighting operations. People who practise this form of photography are called fire photographers.

Since fire photography involves being close to dangerous situations, fire photographers must have special skills and knowledge about emergency incident scenes, operations, health, and safety. Fire photographers are often required to wear firefighter protective equipment.

== Uses of fire photography ==
The work of fire photographers encompasses multiple applications. These include:

- Investigation
- Training
- Fire prevention
- Occupational health and safety
- Post-incident analysis
- Improvement of the public's view on emergency work
- Strengthening of sense of belonging for firefighters

== Involvement with fire departments ==
Fire photographers may or may not be directly employed by fire departments. They provide a specialized photography service which may involve a fee per photograph. Access to safety perimeters can be an issue for fire photographers; thus, they usually develop good relationships with their local fire department to improve access to fire scenes. Such access may, at the fire department's discretion, require additional training or other arrangements. Large departments do often have professional photo service units, such as those in New York City and Chicago.

== Certification ==
A formal fire photographer certification process is being drafted by the International Organization of Fire Photography. The intent of this certification is to attest that an individual has sufficient training, skills and knowledge in relevant areas (health & safety, firefighting operations, etc.) to operate within a safe perimeter of an emergency incident scene.

== See also ==
- Fire buff
