= International Association of Black Professional Firefighters =

Fraternal organization of black firefighters

- Keep the Fire Burning for Justice
- Abbreviation: IABPFF
- Website: iabpf.org

The International Association of Black Professional Firefighters (IABPFF), founded in 1970, is a fraternal organization of black firefighters. It represents more than 8000 fire service personnel throughout the United States, Canada, and the Caribbean, organized in 180 chapters.

== History ==
In September 1969, black and minority fire fighters of all ranks from municipalities across the United States met in New York City for two days of discussion about various problems and injustices affecting African-American firefighters: the recruitment of black youth into the fire service, firefighter-community relations with special emphasis on relations with the residents of neighborhoods inhabited by African Americans, inter-group relations and practices in fire departments, and the need to improve fire prevention programs in the areas of greatest need. The meeting resulted in the founding of the International Association of Black Professional Fire Fighters.

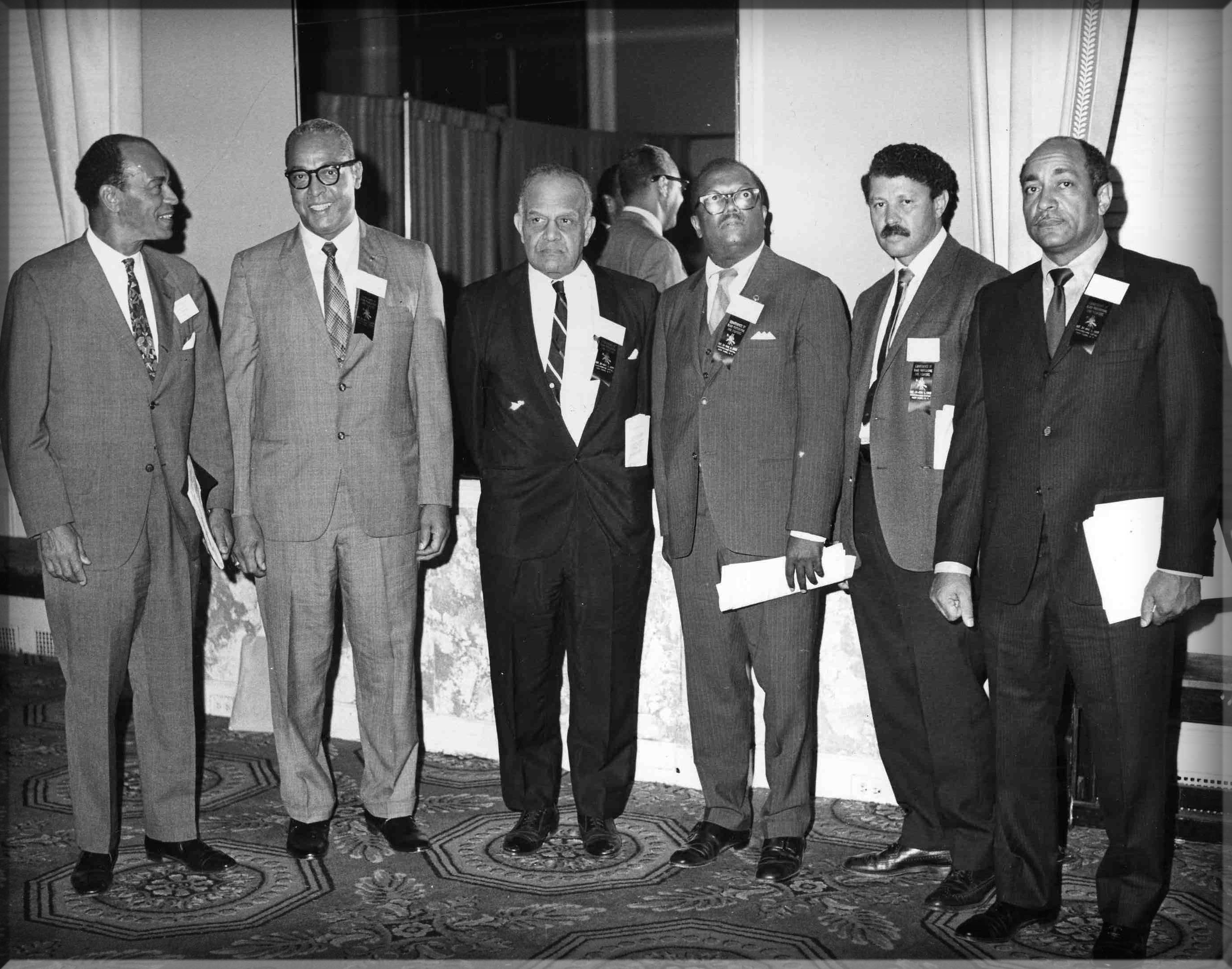
Conferees gather during the IABPFF conference

In October 1970, the first convention of Black Professional Fire Fighters was held in Hartford, Connecticut. The IABPFF is currently led by President Gary Tinney.

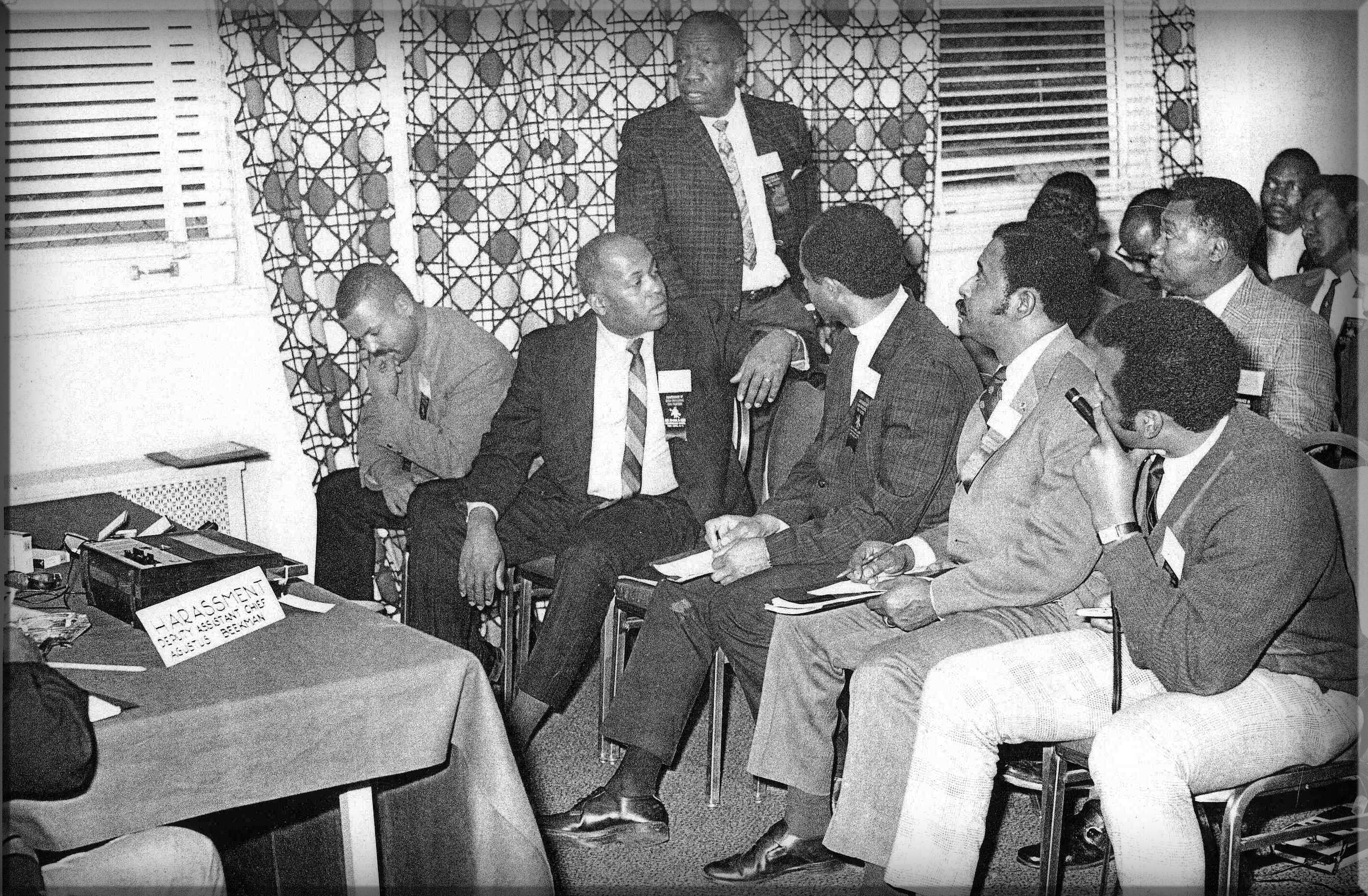
Lieutenant Nelson, standing rear, of the Oklahoma City, OKFD speaks on the subject of harassment at the 1st conference of the IABPFF, Oct 31-Nov 01, 1969

== Chapters ==
Southwest Region

Northeast Region Vulcan Society, The Valiants, Vulcan Blazers, Phoenix Society, Boston Society of Vulcans

Southeast Region Brothers and Sisters Combined

Central Region The Stentorians, Black Firefighters Association

== Medals ==
=== IABPFF Medal of Honor ===
The IABPFF Medal of Honor was established to honor those members whose contributions in leadership, activism, mentorship, and dedication to the ideals of the IABPFF are constant and unyielding. In 2017, IABPFF conferred its Medal of Honor Award to retired NYFD Lt. Ormond Smith. He served the Vulcan Society and the IABPFF in service to these ideals.

=== Medal of Valor ===
The IABPFF Medal of Valor was established to recognize acts upholding the best qualities and aspirations of the professional fire and rescue service. Medal of Valor recipients include:

- Brenda Denise Cowan was Lexington, Kentucky's first black female firefighter and died in the line of duty on February 13, 2004. According to Women in the Fire Service, Lieutenant Cowan is the first black female career firefighter ever to die in the line of duty. She had served with the Lexington Fire Department for twelve years. She was on her first tour of duty after being promoted when the call came for a domestic dispute with injuries. As a result of her line of duty death, the Kentucky senate unanimously passed the Brenda D. Cowan Act, Senate Bill 217, in March 2005. The bill amended KRS 508.025, relating to assault in the third degree, to provide that a person is guilty of assault in the third degree when they cause or attempt to cause physical injury to emergency medical services personnel, organized fire department members, or rescue squad personnel.
- Daryl Gordon was a firefighter with the Cincinnati Fire Department and died while responding to a fire in Madison, falling down an elevator shaft while responding to a fire in which one other firefighter was injured. His funeral was attended by firefighters from across the country.

== Motto ==
The IABPFF celebrates and recognizes their leadership as an organization who “speaks truth to power” over the many decades where they “kept the fire burning for Justice”, to quote Capt. David J. Floyd, the IABPFF founding president.

== Consent decrees ==
In cities where black residents came to achieve an absolute political majority—such as Baltimore, Newark, Gary, Cleveland, and Washington, D.C.—threats of lawsuits forced the integration of those fire departments. Integration and black and minority hiring in those cities, while stormy, went ahead. The IABFF played a role in the lawsuits that dotted the landscape in the 70's and 80's.

Once chapters were organized around the country, legal avenues were opened to force diversity. In other cities, integration of the fire services were not the case, notably Boston ('75), Birmingham ('81), Miami ('77), Memphis ('74, '80), San Francisco ('70), Chicago, Omaha, Austin, St. Louis ('75), Hartford and Los Angeles ('74); where consent decrees forced "quotas" to be imposed in hiring firefighters to mostly white departments due to a lack of political capital to properly integrate them. This political isolation of African Americans during the era of fiscal austerity in the 1970s was a direct cause of the elimination of the gains made in fire service up until then by African Americans and minorities.

As the consent decrees were implemented, fiscal cutbacks forced those last hired to be fired in deference to seniority rules, prompting a new round of lawsuits. Boston suffered from the imposition of a state tax law derived from "Proposition 2½", which caused the elimination of some 200 black firefighters until the layoffs were reversed by funds directly acquired by the city to re-hire them. New York City used the 1975 fiscal crisis to not proceed with court-ordered hiring of black firefighters as a result of a ruling in a 1973 lawsuit filed by the Vulcan Society.

Around the country, various ploys to prevent black people from being hired as firefighters were disguised as fiscal austerity to provide cover for politicians who had no allegiance to nor fear of voter backlash from the minority communities which disproportionately suffered from firehouse closures. For example, black and Puerto Rican neighborhoods in New York City saw 27 firehouses closed in the early 1970s, resulting in an epidemic of building fires, leading to some areas within those neighborhoods losing 80% of the housing stock, which in turn led to overcrowding in adjacent areas followed by a diffusion of the chaos and more fires and loss of housing in those areas. This chain reaction saw social collapse and vast areas turned into urban deserts wholly lacking a normal community life. Despite the havoc the cuts had on those communities, they were never rescinded. Only minorities with no political representation were affected, effectively segregated, and politically marginalized, preventing them from finding allies to oppose the reductions in service to their districts. With nepotism a persisting issue, the makeup of many firehouses still remains a profession passed from father to sons, barring lawsuits to force integration of minorities and women they continue to remain the same as they were in the 1970s era of consent decrees.

== Current litigation ==
FDNY (New York City, NY): Under court-ordered monitoring. Currently hiring from a preferred list condensed from those minorities who passed all tests relevant to hiring and were on the 1999, 2002, and 2007 lists.

AFD (Austin, TX): Consent decree in final stage litigation. Plaintiffs AAAFA decries The Department of Justice in the implementation of the decree, and the most recent rushed resolution by the city council, which is allowing Local 975 (Austin Firefighters Association [AFA]) to be involved in the diversity hiring process. As the party involved in bringing the lawsuit, the AAAFA argued that the Federal consent decree trumps and overrides any state code so that the Local 975 request to enjoin the discussions is deleterious to the process. They stated before the Austin City Council that the state does not allow Local 975 to be involved in the implementation of the consent decree, and the AAAFA said they do not need to be involved with it. In opposition, members of the AFA said they are ready to work with city leaders. However, the judge ruled in favor of the AAAFA.
