= Wesley Augustus Williams =

The third African-American to join the New York Fire Department

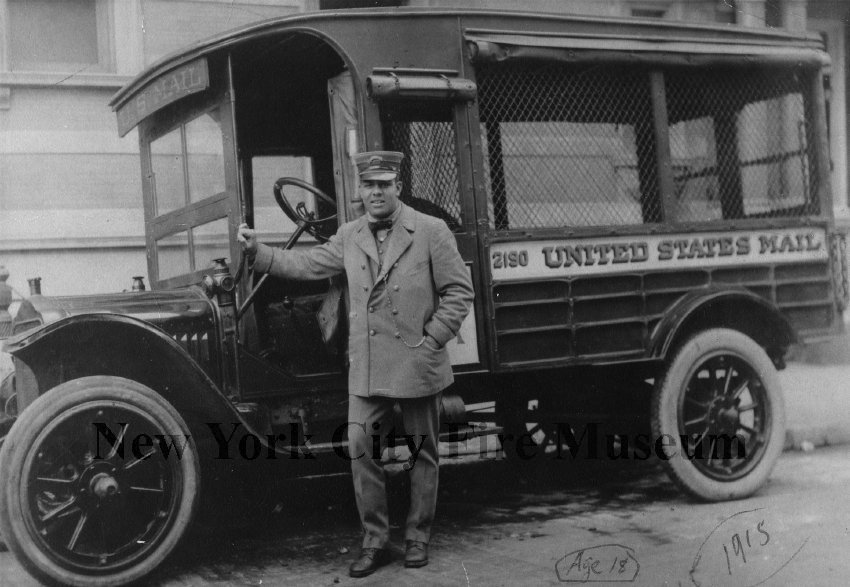
- Wesley Augustus
- Born: Wesley Augustus Williams; August 26, 1897; Manhattan, New York City, US
- Died: July 3, 1984 (aged 86); Forest Hills, New York City, US
- Known for: First African-American officer in the New York City Fire Department
- Spouse: Margaret Russell Ford

Wesley Augustus Williams (August 26, 1897 – July 3, 1984) was the third African-American to join the New York Fire Department and the first to be promoted to an officer. He was one of the founders of the Vulcan Society in 1940.

== Biography ==
He was born on August 26, 1897, to James Henry Williams (1879–1948) and Lucy Metrash (1881–1932) in Manhattan, New York City. His father was chief of the Red Caps at Grand Central Terminal in Manhattan. He married Margaret Russell Ford on November 6, 1915, in Westchester County.

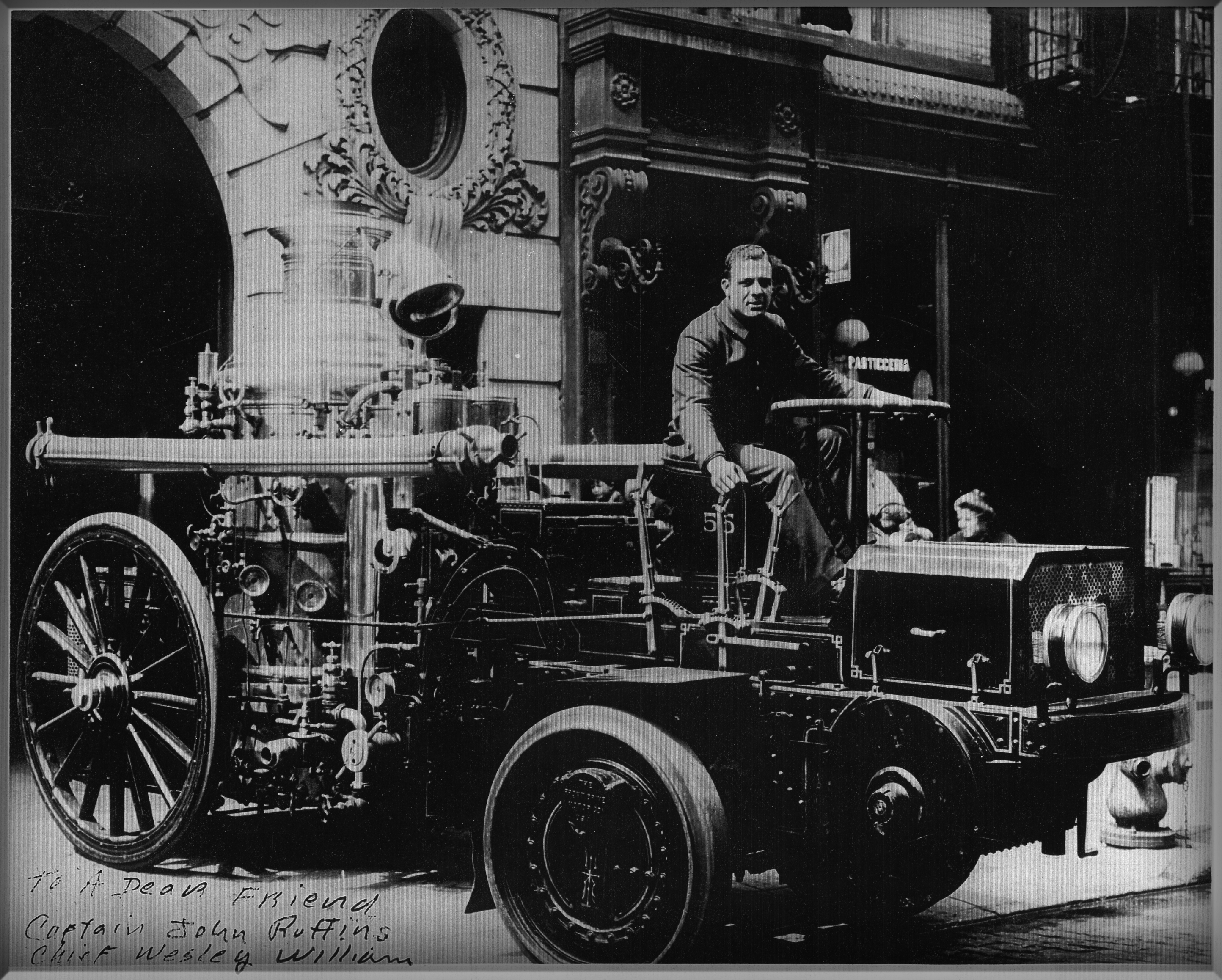
Firefighter Wesley Williams; Engineer of Steamer operating Christie Tractor at 363 Broome St; Engine 55 in Little Italy NYC; circa 1920. The tractor had 2 wheels and pulled the steam fire engine (rear end with large wheels) in place of the Percheron draft horses.

He was inspired to join the New York City Fire Department when he read about Samuel Jesse Battle joining the New York City police department. The first African-American to join the New York City Fire Department was William H. Nicholson, who joined in 1918. Williams joined on January 10, 1919, and he was assigned to Engine Company 55 in Manhattan, New York City. He was promoted to lieutenant in 1927.

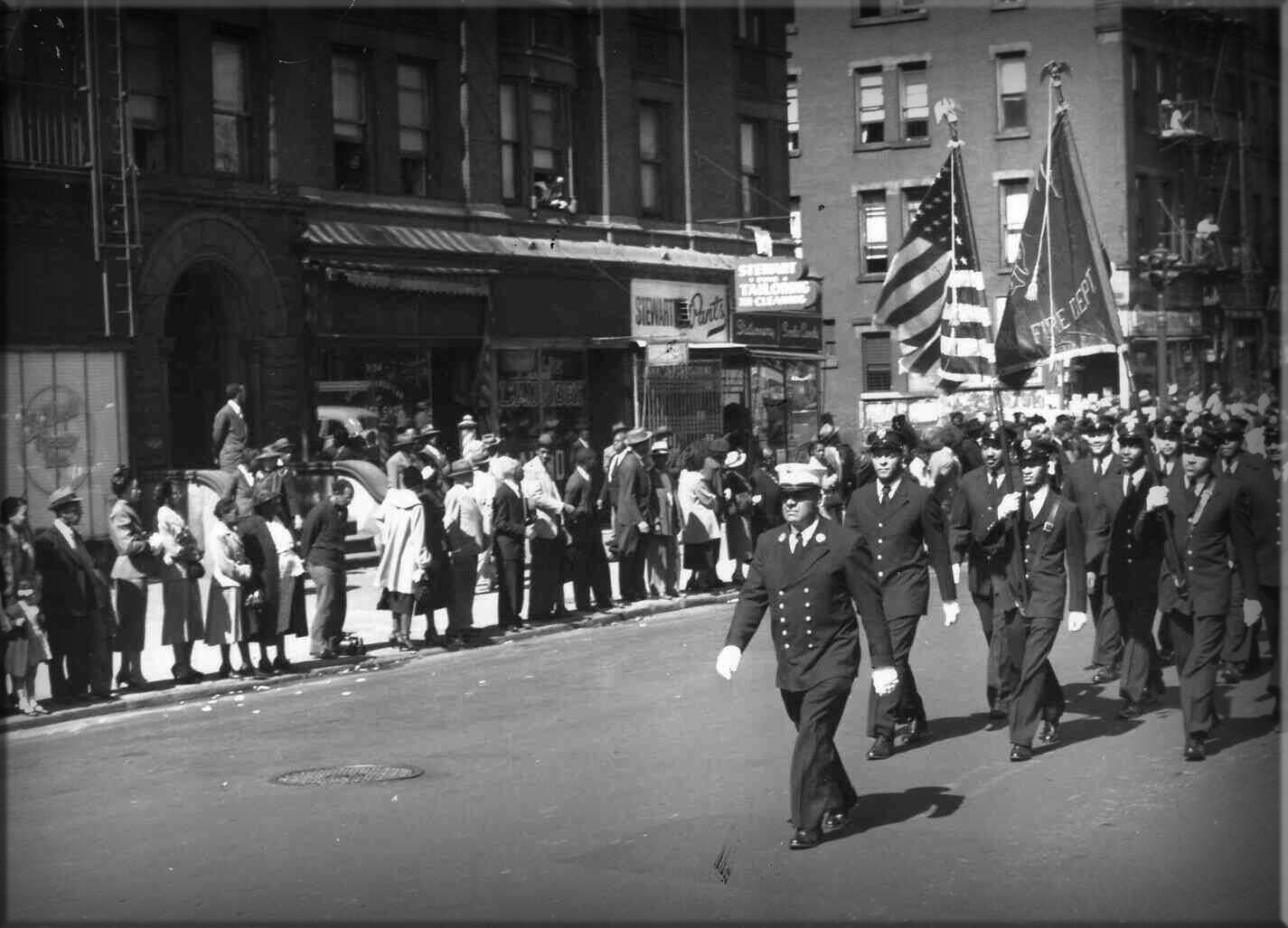
Chief Wesley Williams leads the Vulcan Society contingent thru Harlem during the annual African-American day parade

He retired in 1952 with the rank of battalion chief. His lasting legacy, The Vulcan Society of the FDNY honors him as a founder of the fraternal organization; as an officer of the FDNY he declined office with the society. At the African-American day parades thru Harlem he often was the lead Vulcan as the highest ranking black officer.

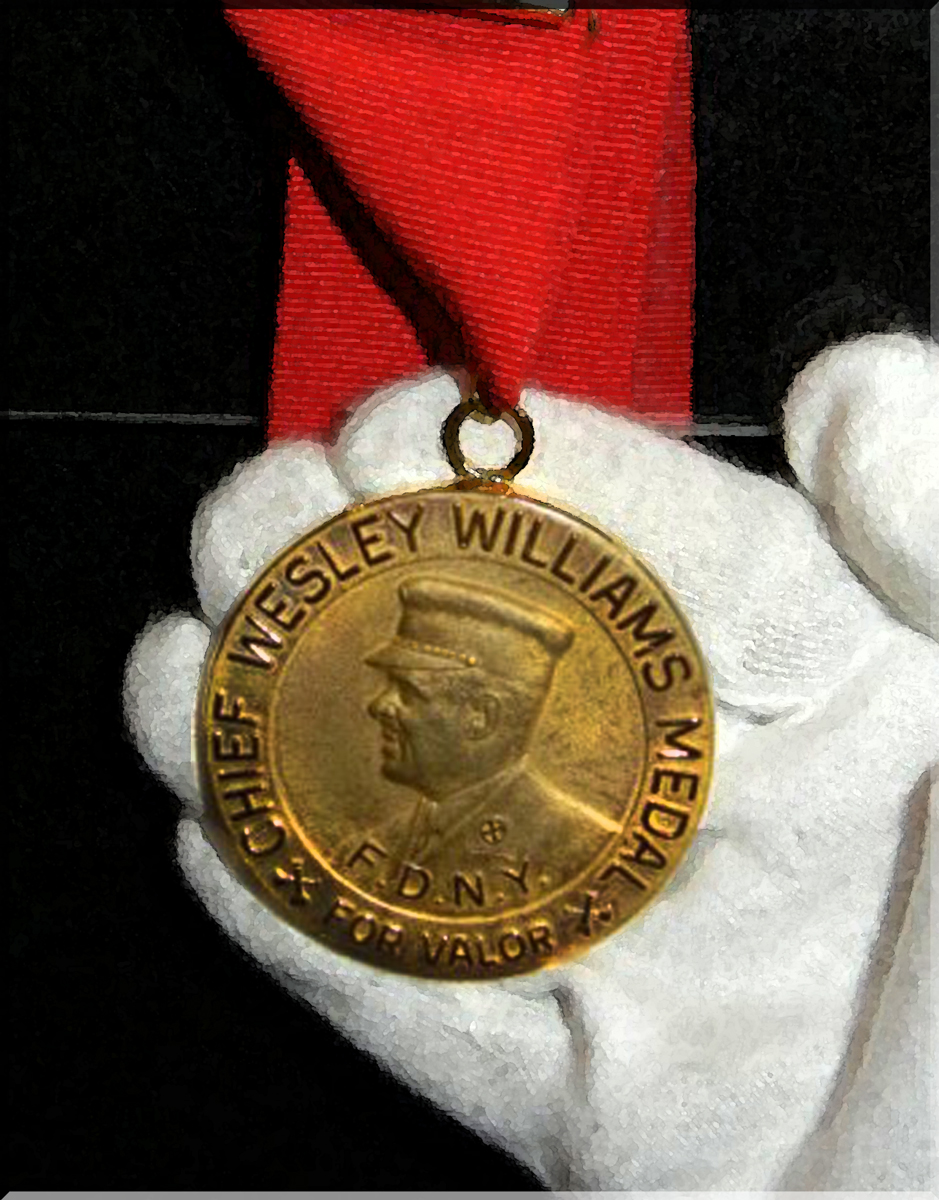
FDNY Department Honor - The Chief Wesley Williams Medal for Valor

The FDNY bestows for bravery the Chief Wesley Williams medal at medal day ceremonies.

He died on July 3, 1984, at the Physicians Hospital in Jackson Heights, New York City, he was 86 years old.

== Legacy ==
His papers are archived at the New York Public Library at the Schomburg Center for Research in Black Culture.
