= Detmer =

Detmer (or Detmers) is a surname. It may refer to:

- A. M. Detmer (c. 1885), U.S. tailor (see A. M. Detmer House)
- Amanda Detmer (born 1971), U.S. actress
- Don E. Detmer (born ?), U.S. doctor and professor
- Freda Detmers (1867-1934), U.S. botanist
- Hendrik Detmers (1761–1825), Dutch general
- Joseph Detmer (born 1983), U.S. decathlete and icosathlete
- Julian Francis Detmer (1865–1958), U.S. business man (see Detmer Woolen Company)
- Koy Detmer (born 1973), U.S. football player
- Maruschka Detmers (born 1962), Dutch actress
- Reid Detmers (born 1999), American baseball player
- Theodor Detmers (1902–1976), German naval commander
- Ty Detmer (born 1967), U.S. football player
- Wilhelm Detmer (1850–1930), German botanist and agriculturalist
