= Nicholas J. Hayes =

American Politician

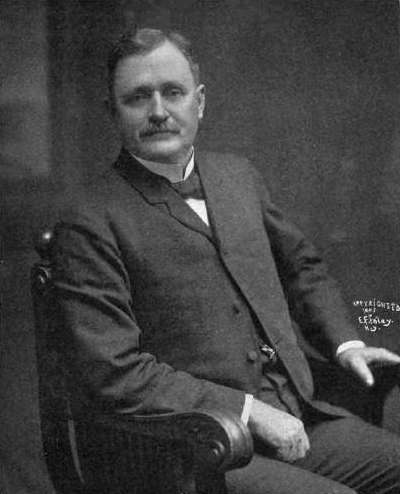
- Hayes as Fire Commissioner of New York City in 1908
- Born: 1856; Troy, New York, U.S.
- Died: January 3, 1928 (aged 71–72); Manhattan, New York City, U.S.
- Other name: Nick Hayes
- Occupations: Fire Commissioner of New York City, Sheriff of New York County, Commissioner of Water Supply
- Known for: Tammany Hall political boss in East Harlem

Nicholas J. Hayes (1856 – January 3, 1928) was a politician from New York City and one of the powers of the Democratic Party's Tammany Hall political machine for 30 years. His political power base was the 28th Assembly District (formerly the 33rd Assembly District) in lower East Harlem. He served as Fire Commissioner of New York City two times.

== Early life ==
Nick Hayes was born in 1858 in Troy, New York of Irish parents. The family later moved to New York, where Hayes was educated in St. Francis Xavier's School. As a boy he had several odd jobs. He worked for the pharmaceutical company of McKesson & Robbins on Fulton Street, then he became a grocer's clerk and later a clerk in a tea house.

According to an obituary in the New York Sun, Hayes "had a way of getting along pleasantly – a bland, ingratiating way which was to smooth the road for him in politics and soon became a protégé of Tammany Hall boss Richard Croker." Croker made him a clerk of the Superior Court, which was later merged into the Supreme Court.

After the victory of Tammany Hall politicians in 1897 Hayes was made Deputy City Clerk with a salary of USD 5,000 a year – a handsome salary in those days. That was also the year that Hayes wrested the leadership of the 33rd Assembly District in eastern Harlem from former Police Justice William H. Burke after an intense fight.

== Political stronghold ==
Hayes established the Pocasset Club to help him to get a hold on the district. The club would become one of the strongest clubs in the Tammany Hall organization. For years the clubhouse was at 208 East 116th Street from which Hayes ruled as the Tammany chieftain. The 28th Assembly District (formerly the 33rd Assembly District) in lower East Harlem became his political stronghold for the next 20 years. At the time the district was bounded roughly by 106th Street, Park Avenue, 119th Street and the East River and included Ward's Island and Randall's Island and the Little Italy section. It had the smallest vote of any Assembly district in Manhattan.

In twenty years Hayes lost the district only once, when a Republican was elected to the Assembly. In 1910, Henry H. Lazarus made an unsuccessful contest, supported by the upcoming Italian-American lawyer Salvatore A. Cotillo. After the defeat, Cotillo, supported by the increasing ethnic Italian-American vote, made a deal with Hayes that gave Little Italy a political foothold in the city. Due to the new alliance the district would be the first to send an Italian-American to the Assembly – Cotillo – and would produce the first Italian Magistrate and Judge – Francis X. Mancuso.

== Political offices ==
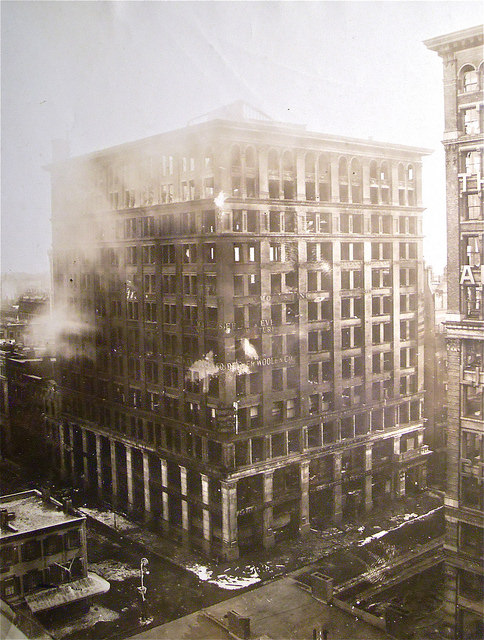
The Parker Building on fire, January 10, 1908

Hayes was appointed the third Fire Commissioner of New York City by Mayor George B. McClellan, Jr. on January 1, 1904, and served in that position until his resignation on December 31, 1905. In 1905, Hayes was elected Sheriff of New York County, New York. Three years later, on March 13, 1908, Mayor McClellan, after the death of Hugh Bonner, again put him at the head of the Fire Department. He served in that position until January 3, 1910, shortly after the end of the McClellan Administration.

During his first term as Fire Commissioner, Hayes was blamed for being responsible for the purchase of inferior hose that had caused the deaths of three firefighters and the collapse of the 13-story Parker Building in January 1908. A report of the New York and National Boards of Fire Underwriters exonerated him from blame.

During the bitter contest between Mayor McClellan and Tammany Hall leader Charles Francis Murphy, which came near to disrupting Tammany Hall, Hayes managed to keep good relations with both political bosses. Due to his lucrative political offices and skilful investments he made a good deal of money. The revolt against his leadership in 1910 by Lazarus and Cottilo was based on the belief that Hayes had grown so well-to-do that he had lost touch with his constituency in the poor district. They accused him of having a butler and of being addicted to the game of golf.

In 1912 he had to testify before the Curran Committee investigating police corruption in New York. In 1918 he was appointed by Mayor John Francis Hylan to head the Department of Water Supply, Gas and Electricity and was continued in the post by Mayor Jimmy Walker in 1926.

== Death and legacy ==
Heart disease ended his life on January 3, 1928, at his home in 57 East 19th Street in Manhattan, New York City, 72 years old, while he was the acting Commissioner of Water Supply. The day before, he had been charged by the Republican County Committee to have abandoned work on a municipal water supply for the Rockaways and had granted a private corporation the right to tap city mains and to sell the city's own water back to residents at "tremendous prices". After his death, he was absolved of any wrongdoing.

Hayes had been one of the powers of Tammany Hall for thirty years, and for the last ten years one of the elder statesmen. He was survived by his wife, Mrs. Mary L. Hayes; by a son, Matthias, and by three daughters, Katherine, Helen and Nora.

Fire appointments
Preceded by Thomas Sturgis	FDNY Commissioner; 1904–1905	Succeeded by John H. O'Brien
Preceded by Hugh Bonner	FDNY Commissioner; 1908–1910	Succeeded by Rhinelander Waldo
