= Behind the Singer Tower =

1912 short story by Willa Cather

- Short story by Willa Cather
- Country: United States
- Language: English
- Genre: Short story

Publication
- Published in: Collier's
- Publication type: Magazine
- Publication date: May 1912

"Behind the Singer Tower" is a short story by Willa Cather. It was first published in Collier's in May 1912.

== Plot summary ==
The Mont Blanc Hotel, a luxurious hotel in New York City gets set on fire, thus killing many prominent figures. This prompts the narrator to think back to the time a similar thing had happened, only to poor people. Caesarino, a poor worker, had died in an accident during the construction of the Mont Blanc, only a few days before his trip back to Ischia, where his family was waiting for him. This led the narrator to sue the building manager, Stanley Merryweather. Both men are now well known to dislike each other. The narrator reflects that Caesarino might have been better off on his native island, but he was lured by the New York idea...

== Characters ==
- the narrator, a journalist.
- Fred Hallet, an engineer.
- Johnson, a journalist.
- A lawyer from the District Attorney's office.
- Zablowski, a Jewish doctor from the Rockefeller Institute.
- Graziani, a tenor.
- Stanley Merryweather.
- Fanny Reizenstein, Stanley Merryweather's wife.
- Caesarino, an Italian American builder.

== Allusions to other works ==
There are allusions to Sandro Botticelli, and the Song of Songs.

== Allusions to actual history ==
It has been argued that the story might have been prompted by the Windsor Hotel fire of March 17, 1899.

== Literary significance and criticism ==
It has been suggested that the story was influenced by Gustave Flaubert's Salammbô and Joseph Conrad's Heart of Darkness.
