= San Nicolas Fire Station =

Fire station in San Nicolas, Manila, Philippines

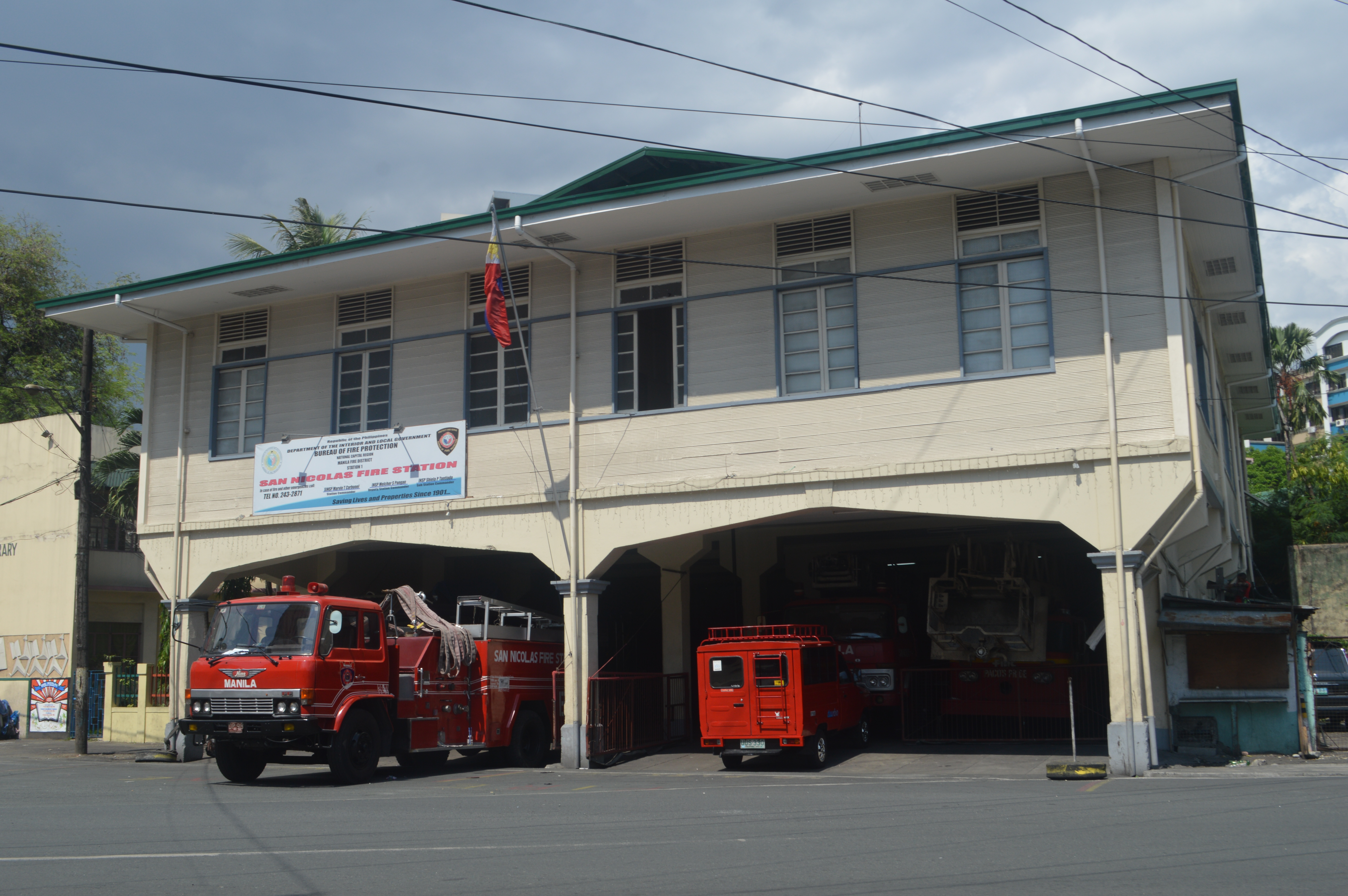
- The renovated San Nicolas Fire Station facade in 2014
- Interactive map of San Nicolas Fire Station

General information
- Type: Fire station
- Location: 296 San Fernando Street cor. Madrid Street, San Nicolas, Manila, Philippines
- Coordinates: 14°35′50″N 120°58′13″E
- Completed: July 25, 1903
- Renovated: 2013
- Owner: Bureau of Fire Protection

Technical details
- Floor count: 2

San Nicolas Fire Station is a fire station in San Nicolas, Manila, the Philippines. It is one of the first fire stations built in the country, having been established under the tenure of first Manila Fire Department chief Hugh Bonner during the American colonial era.

== Background ==
Fire fighting in the country during the Spanish times was unorganized. The task was usually assigned to street sweepers who would rush to the scene of a fire in case of an alert. However, it was only during the early American period, in August 1901, that firefighting became institutionalized and consequently gave birth to Manila Fire Department established by the Philippine Commission.

The following year, Capt. Hugh Bonner was designated fire chief. Formerly chief of the New York Fire Department, he was credited to have introduced rules and regulations for firemen and a telephone system to receive alarm. Moreover, it was also under his administration that the San Nicolas Fire Station was constructed.

== Structure ==
Built during Bonner's tenure, San Nicolas Fire Station was hailed as one of the firsts to have been established in Manila and was then "considered modern in every aspect," primarily attributed to its sufficiently equipped system in protecting the entire district of san Nicolas, which was then noted for its vulnerability due to commercial warehouses located within the locality. Built in 1903, it was the 5th fire station to be built, and 1st to be constructed entirely by the Americans. The first four (Intramuros, Tanduay, Paco, Sta. cruz) were existing stations for the local "bomberos" during the Spanish era before renovated as dedicated fire stations.

In his renowned historical book "Manila, My Manila," Philippine National Artist for Literature, Nick Joaquin, describes the station as the "cradle of boxing in the city" since it boasted of a fully functional gymnasium visited by a number of sports enthusiasts.

== Restoration ==
In order to preserve as much of its original structural design, the need to restore the station became eminent and was deemed necessary, not just structurally but functionally as well. According to SFO1 Edgardo G. Mendoza, the then non-commissioned officer-in-charge of the fire station, the structure was restored and repainted in 2013 upon the endorsement of the National Historical Commission of the Philippines. The facade and interiors were repainted and replaced with newer materials without sacrificing its original design. The original fireman poles, windows, rooms, and wooden interior remained intact and true to their original form. "The building remains fully functional despite its century-old existence," says a report from "Kape at Balita," a GMA News TV's early morning public affairs program.

== Firefighting Museum ==
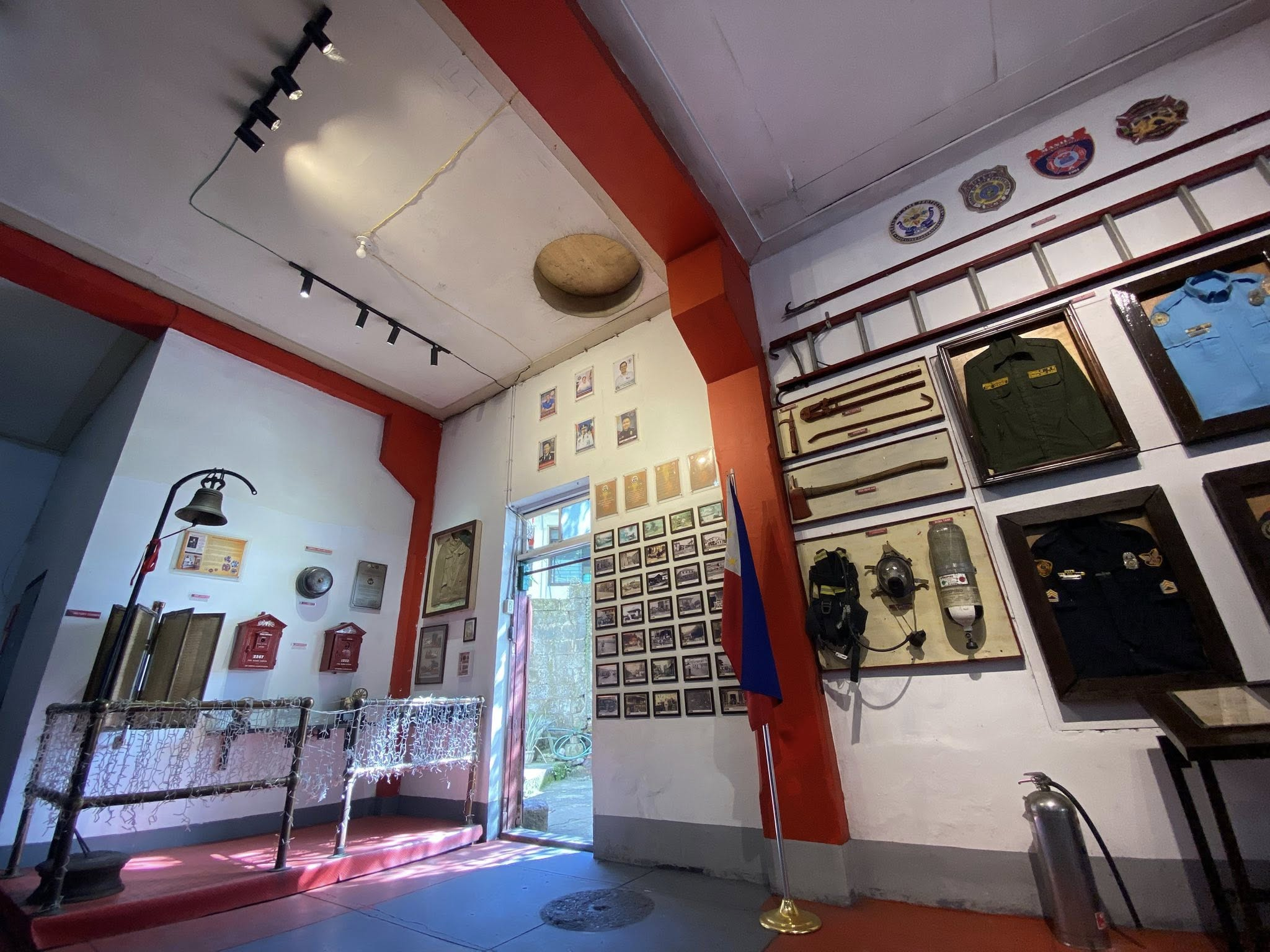
Image of the San Nicolas fire museum located on one of the vehicle bays of the station

On August 7, 2025, a small museum exhibit was added at the station's vehicle bay showcasing collected antiques ranging from retrieved Gamewell fire alarm boxes, previous iterations of the fire district's uniform, old photos of the Manila Fire Department, to assorted fire fighting equipment are displayed. The initiative as spearheaded by heritage advocate Peter Danielle Rallos and Substation commander Francisco Montevirgen under the leadership of Fire Senior Superintendent Aristotle B. Bañaga along with the kind contributions of retired and veteran firefighters adding to the museum's narrative.

Additional Fire museums are eyed for the remaining historical fire stations in Manila specifically Tanduay fire station, Paco fire station, and Intramuros fire station.

== See also ==
- Manila Fire District
