= San Nicolas, Manila =

District of Manila, Metro Manila, Philippines

San Nicolas
- District of Manila
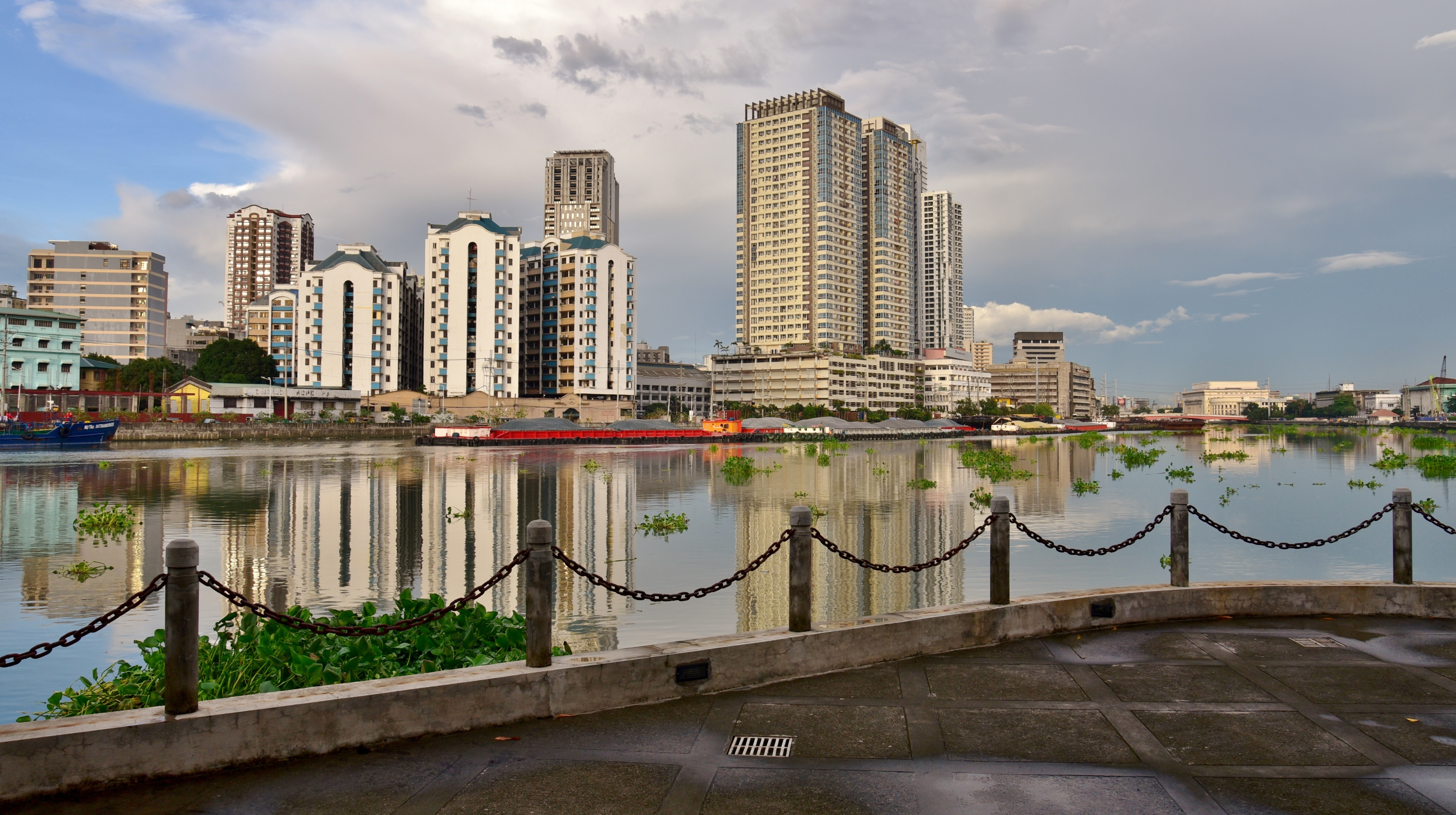
- San Nicolas skyline from the Pasig River

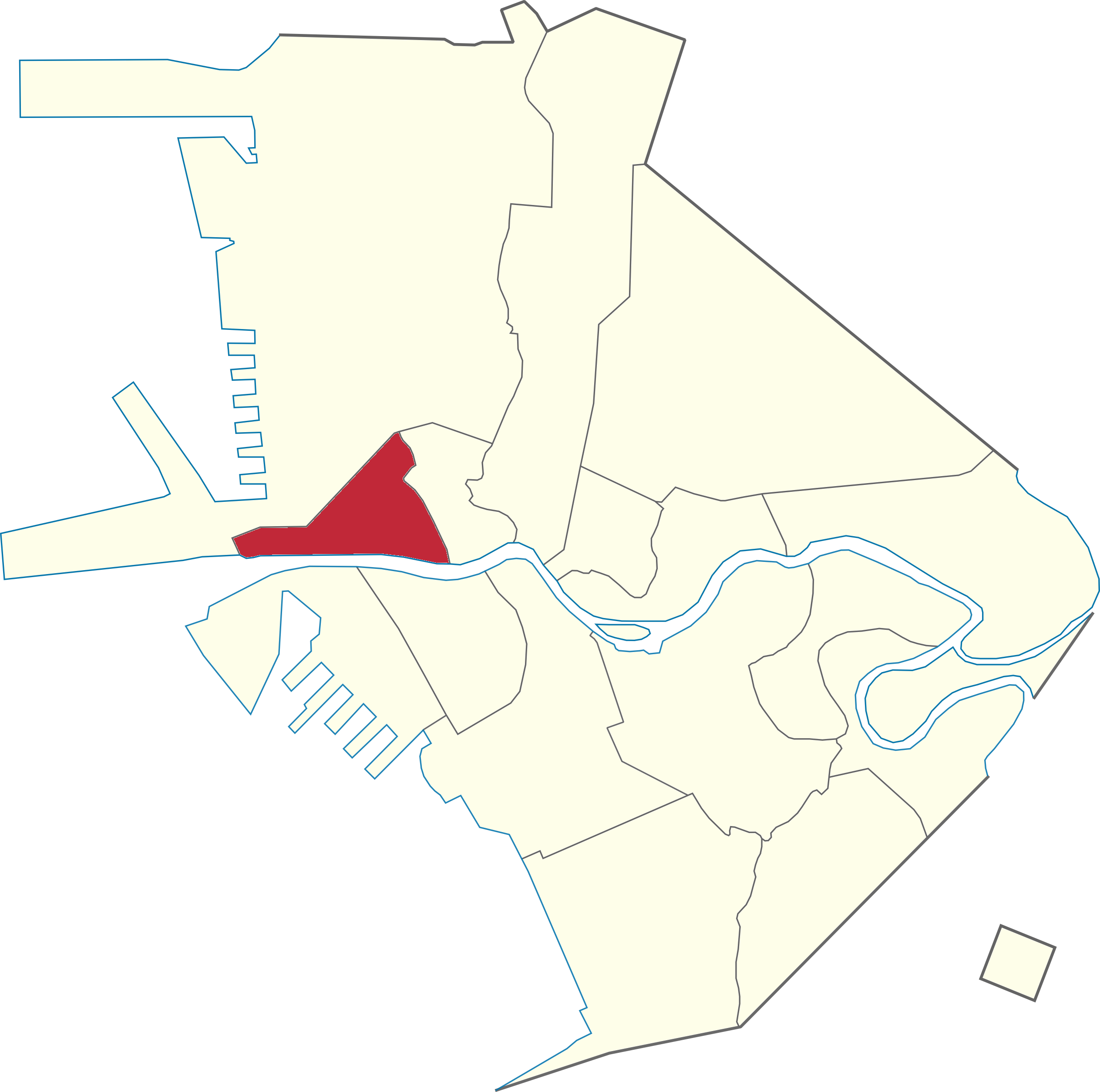
- Country: Philippines
- Region: National Capital Region
- City: Manila
- Congressional district: Part of the 3rd district of Manila
- Barangays: 15
- Founded: 1598
- Founder: Dominican Order
- Named for: Saint Nicholas

Area
  - Total: 1.6385 km^{2} (0.6326 sq mi)

Population (2020)
  - Total: 42,957
  - Density: 26,217/km^{2} (67,902/sq mi)
- Zip codes: 1010
- Area codes: 2

San Nicolas is one of the sixteen districts in the city of Manila in the Philippines. It is located at the west central part of the city, on the northern bank of the Pasig River bounded by the districts of Binondo to the east by Estero de Binondo, and Tondo to the north and west, and by the Pasig River to the south. Considered as a heritage district of Manila, this community has kept its 19th-century ancestral houses, which symbolizes the wealthy lives of the people who used to live there, similar to the ancestral houses of Silay and Vigan.

As of the May 1, 2020, national census, the population of San Nicolas, which is composed of 15 barangays named as numbers from 268 to 276 and from 281 to 286, is 42,957. This is slightly lower than the 2010 census that counted San Nicolas residents at 44,241.

== History ==
The town of San Nicolas was originally named Baybay, meaning "shore" in Tagalog.

According to Piet Van der Loon (1966), a Sangley Chinese community had already settled in Baybay near Tondo on the banks of the Pasig river, before the Spanish conquest of Manila in the Battle of Manila (1570), and way before the market at Parián (modern-day Arroceros Urban Forest Park) attracted large numbers of traders and craftsmen, especially immigrants and merchants from Southern Fujian, so before Parián and Binondo became the local Chinatown of the area, Sangley Chinese settlers and merchants were already living in Baybay in between Tondo and old Manila (modern-day Intramuros) on the south bank of the Pasig river.

During Spanish rule, Baybay was renamed to San Nicolas, after the patron saint of sailors, boatmen, and mariners. San Nicolas is now the western part of Manila Chinatown, the first Chinatown in the Philippines, and perhaps the world; the eastern part is Binondo, which was founded in 1594 by Governor-General Luis Pérez Dasmariñas. The Dominican order came to western part of Chinatown in 1596 and then founded San Nicolas in 1598. This was the first mission by the Dominicans outside Intramuros.

In 1901, during the American Occupation of the Philippines, San Nicolas became a district of the newly chartered city of Manila as its borders were extended outside the walled city presently known as Intramuros. Daniel Burnham, an American architect and urban planner, was commissioned to build a Plan of Manila. The result of the plan was the making of places and parishes that included San Nicolas. In modern times, San Nicolas is one of the administrative districts of Manila and part of the third legislative district of Manila. It became an extension of the Filipino-Chinese community in Binondo.

== Barangays ==
Barangay	Land area (km²)	Population (2020 census)
Zone 25
Barangay 268	0.04373	489
Barangay 269	0.04217	904
Barangay 270	0.03705	918
Barangay 271	0.06139	633
Barangay 272	0.01970	1,064
Barangay 273	0.02041	825
Barangay 274	0.01210	1,944
Barangay 275	0.02696	19,809
Barangay 276	0.02080	2,543
Zone 26
Barangay 281	0.09284	2,288
Barangay 282	0.1113	2,458
Barangay 283	0.05035	1,345
Barangay 284	0.05324	961
Barangay 285	0.05489	2,066
Barangay 286	0.04595	4,710

Barangays 268, 269, 270, 271, 272, 273, 274, 275, and 276 are part of Zone 25; and Barangays 281, 282, 283, 284, 285, and 286 are part of Zone 26.

== List of cultural properties of San Nicolas ==
Cultural Property wmph identifier (Note: wmph is an internal identifier used by Wikimedia Philippines to identify the monument. This is not an official identifier, and only shown temporarily in the templates until the government creates an updated complete list.)	Site name	Description	Province	City or municipality	Address	Coordinates	Image
	Pasig River Lighthouse	Pasig River Lighthouse	Metro Manila	San Nicolas, Manila	Muelle dela Industria Street	14°35′47″N 120°57′39″E	Upload Photo
	General Antonio Luna Ancestral House	General Antonio Luna Ancestral House	Metro Manila	San Nicolas, Manila	#457 Urbiztondo Street	14°35′54″N 120°58′20″E	Upload Photo
	IDES O'Racca Building	IDES O'Racca Building	Metro Manila	San Nicolas, Manila	M. De Santos St.	14°35′54″N 120°58′20″E	Upload file

== In art ==
- Barrio de San Nicolas—Calle de Ylang-Ylang, watercolor by José Honorato Lozano, n.d.

== Gallery ==
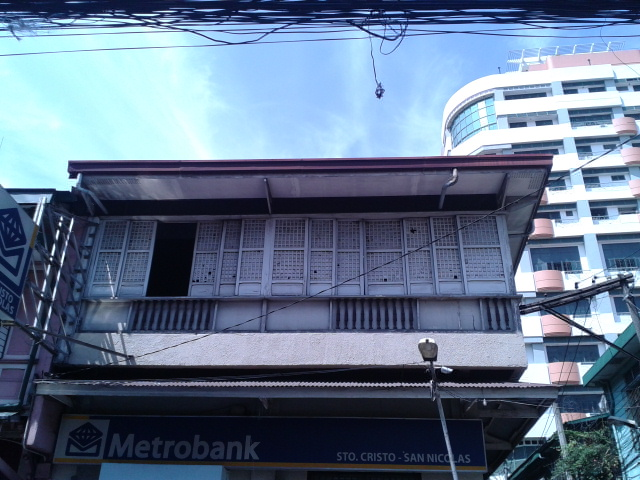
Ancestral house

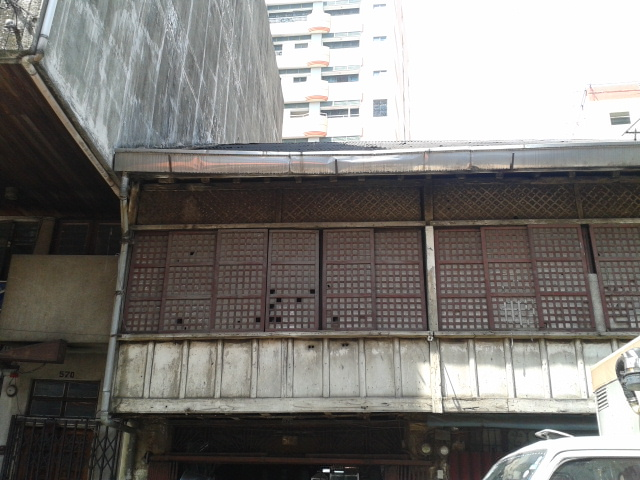
Ancestral house

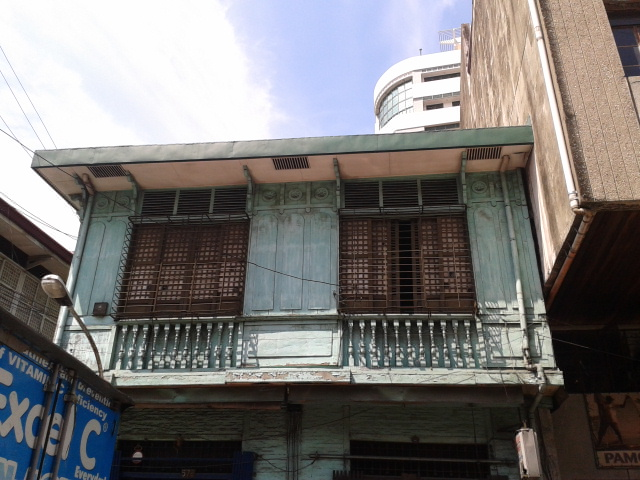
Ancestral house

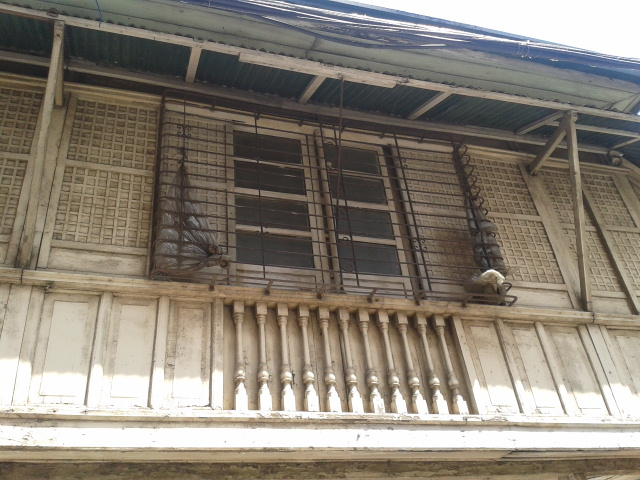
Ancestral house

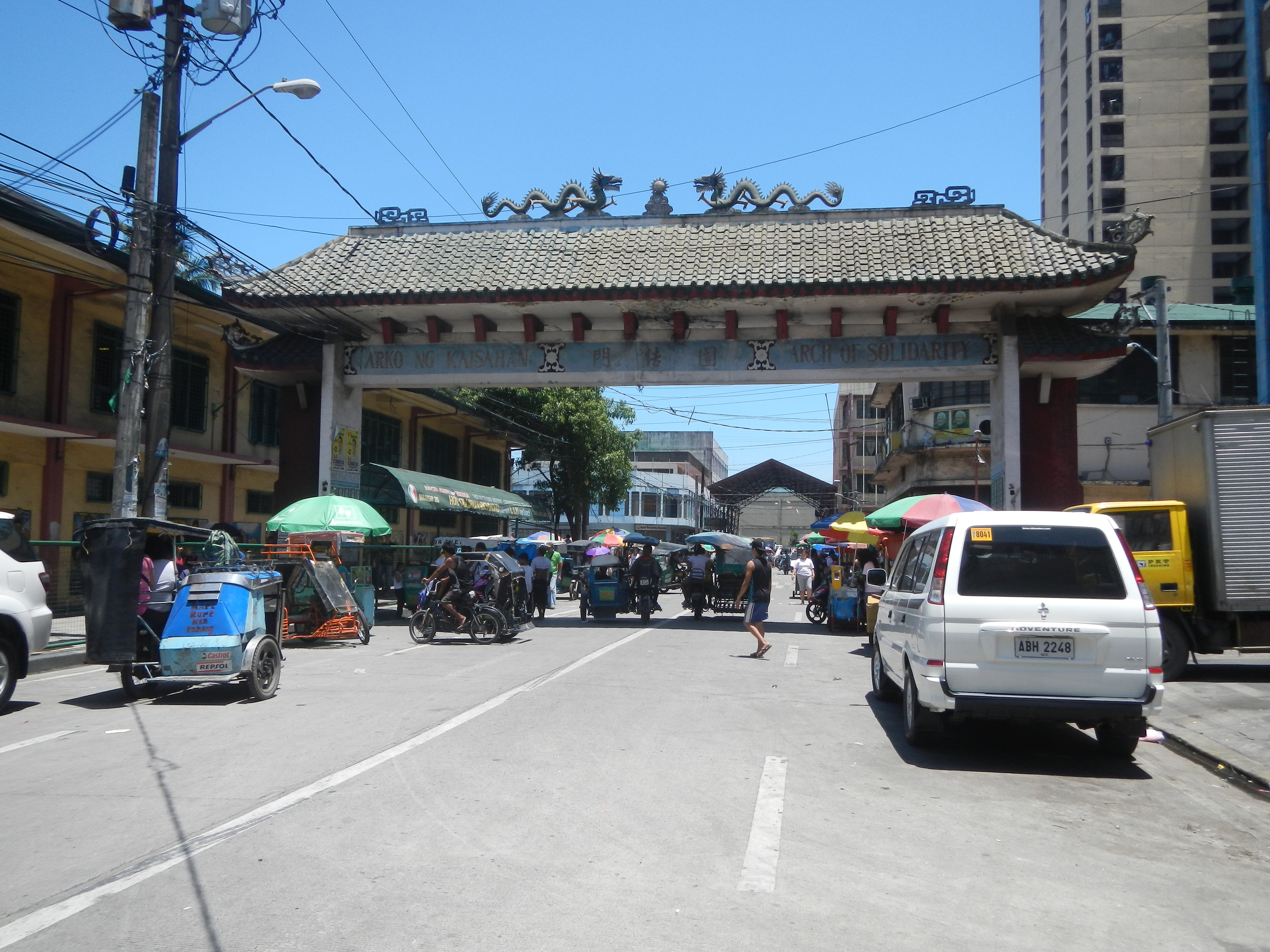
Arch of Solidarity

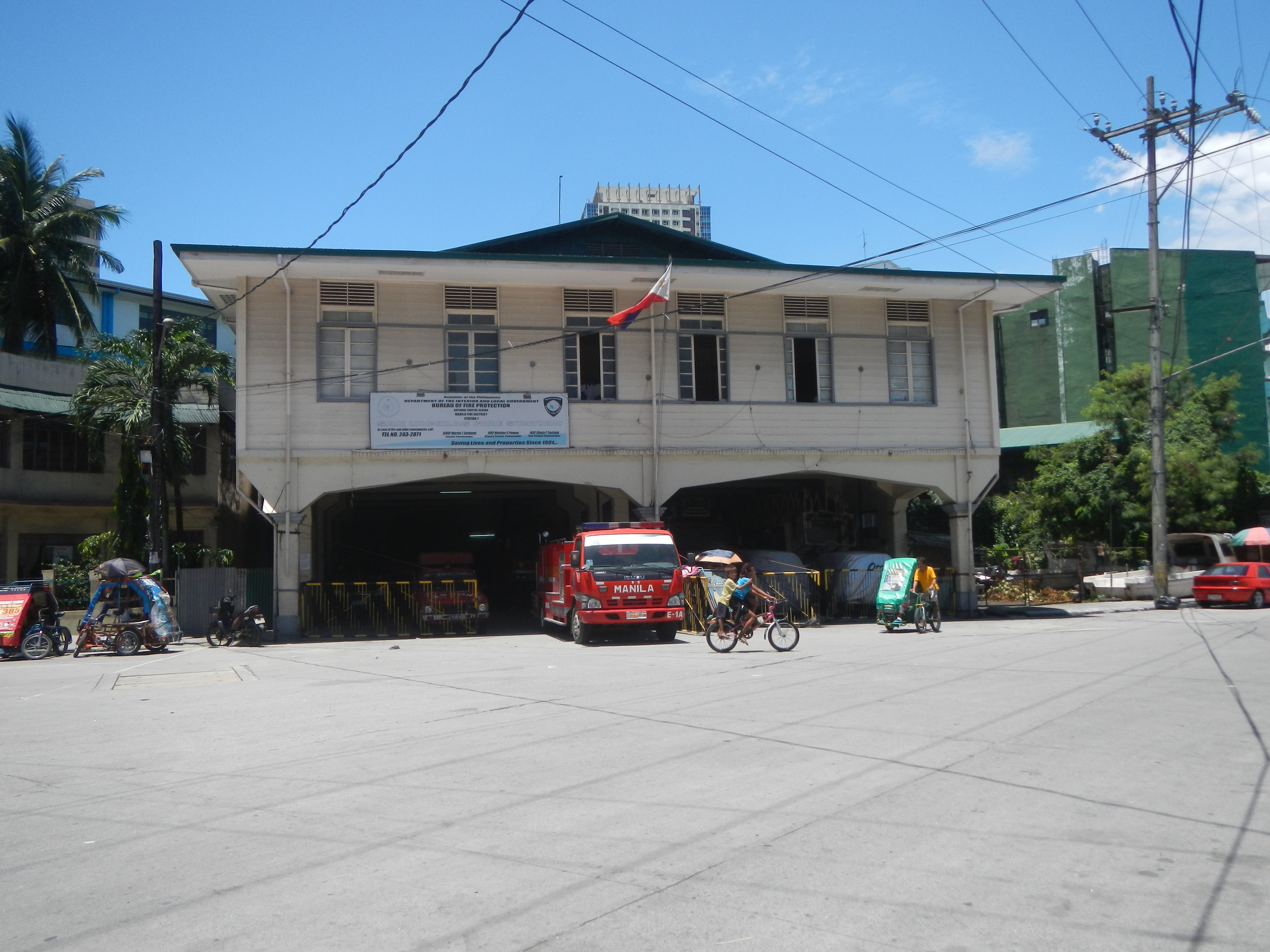
Fire Station

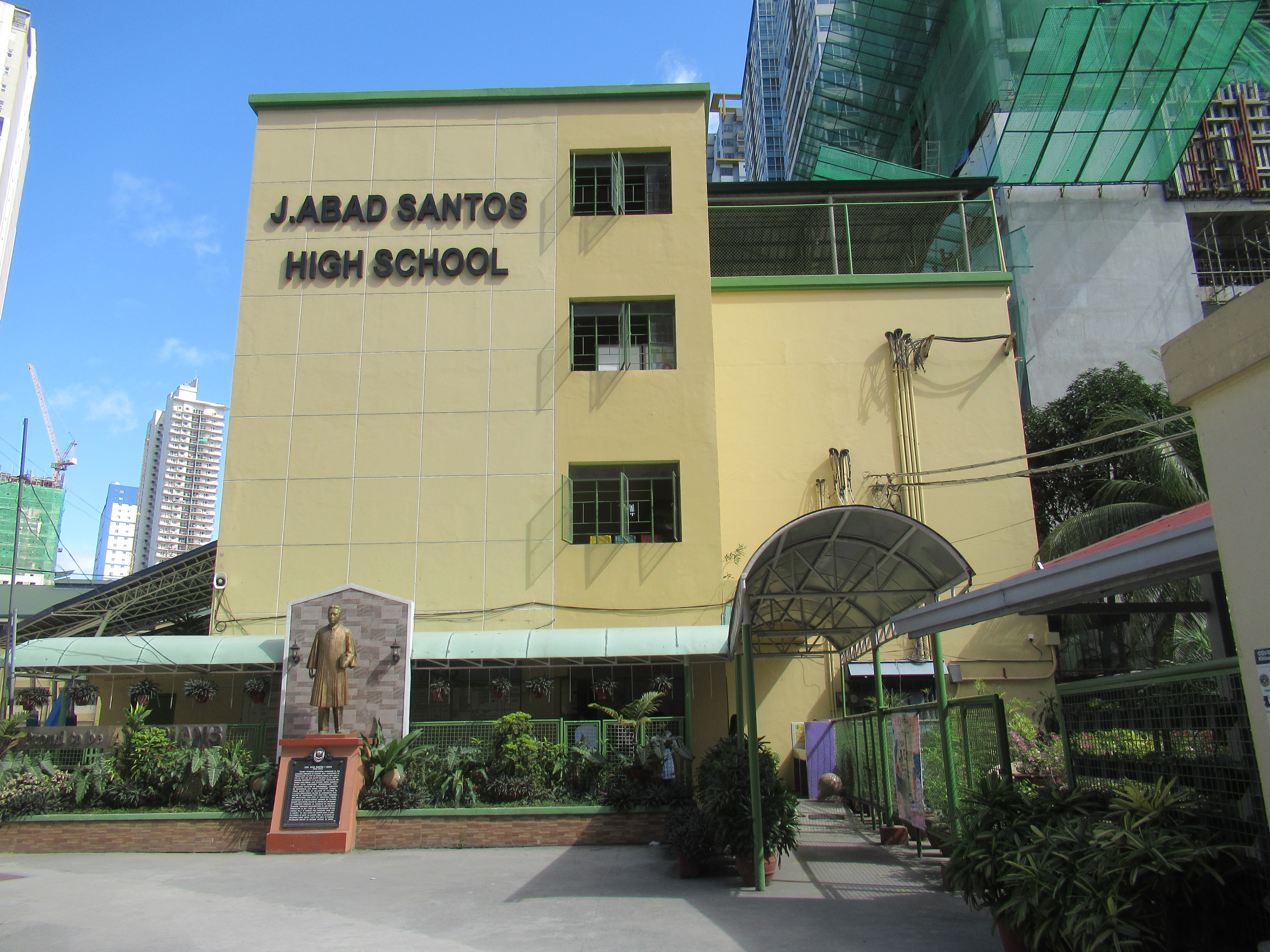
Jose Abad Santos High School

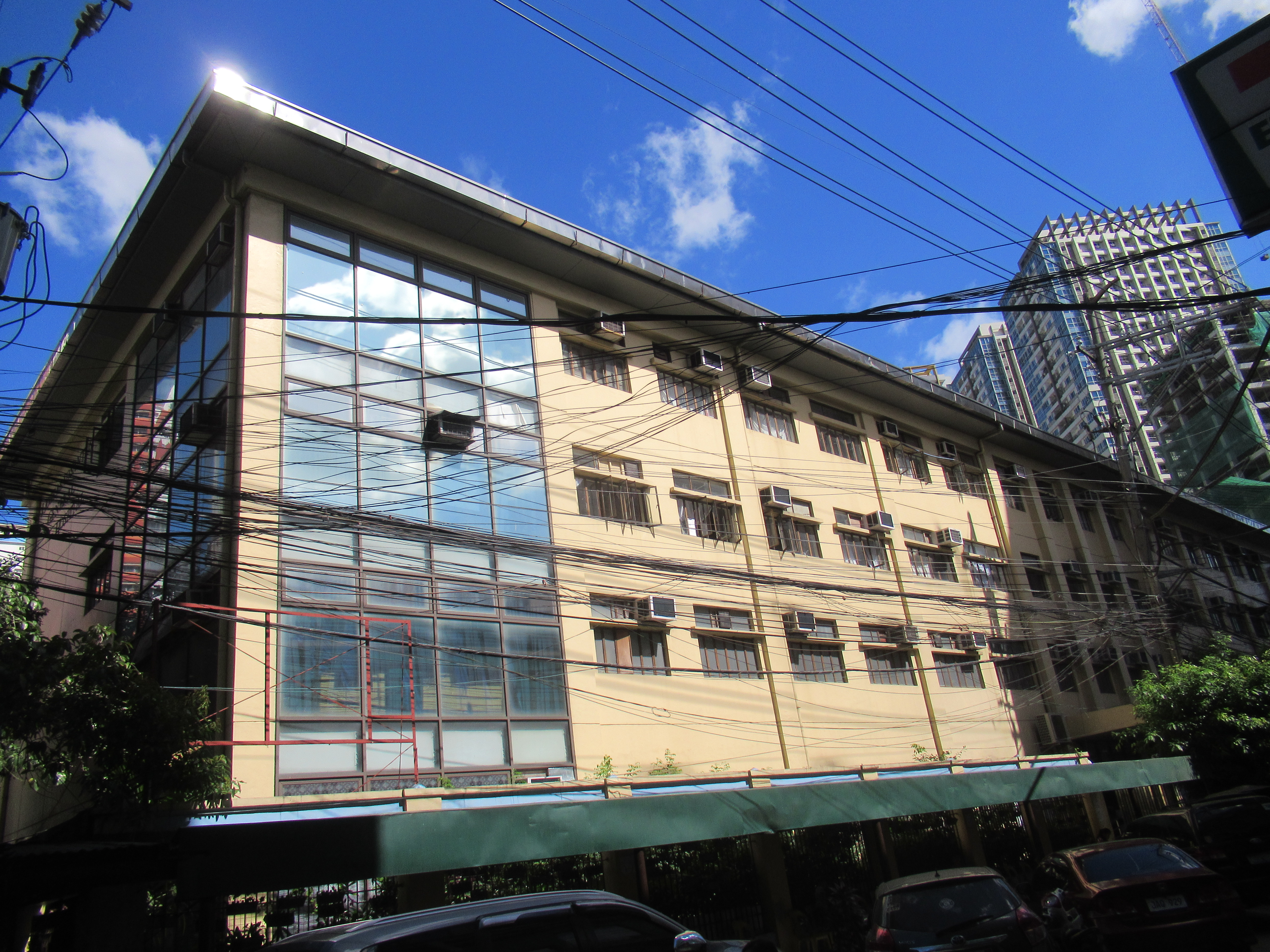
Justice Jose Abad Santos General Hospital

== Notable ==
- Teodora Alonso Realonda
- Antonio Luna
- Isidoro de Santos
- Yul Servo (residency only)

== See also ==
- San Nicolas Fire Station, Manila

== Sources ==
- Van der Loon, Piet (1966). "The Manila Incunabula and Early Hokkien Studies, Part 1" (PDF). Asia Major. New Series. 12: 1–43. Archived from the original (PDF) on February 24, 2021.
