= John H. O'Brien =

John H. O'Brien was appointed the fourth fire commissioner of the City of New York by Mayor George B. McClellan, Jr. on January 1, 1906 and served in that position until his resignation on October 10, 1906.

Fire appointments
| Preceded by Nicholas J. Hayes | FDNY Commissioner; 1906 | Succeeded by Francis J. Lantry |
