= Francis J. Lantry =

5th Fire Commissioner of New York City

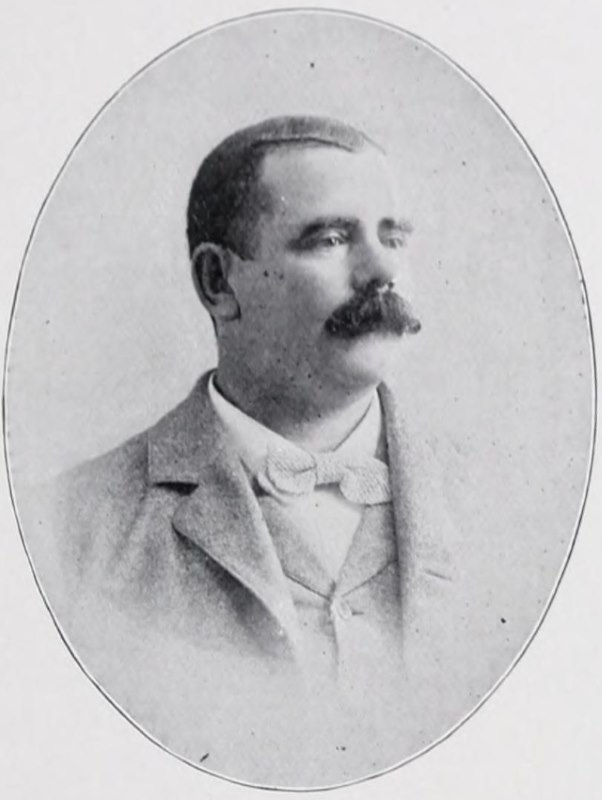

Francis J. Lantry (1859 - October 7, 1922) was appointed the fifth Fire Commissioner of the City of New York by Mayor George B. McClellan, Jr. on October 10, 1906, and served in that position until he resigned on February 10, 1908.

== Biography ==
He was born in 1859 in New York City. He died on October 7, 1922, in Manhattan, New York City.

Fire appointments
Preceded by John H. O'Brien	FDNY Commissioner; 1906–1908	Succeeded by Hugh Bonner
