= Windsor Hotel fire =

1899 fire in Manhattan, New York

Coordinates: 40°45′22.6″N 73°58′42.5″W

Windsor Hotel
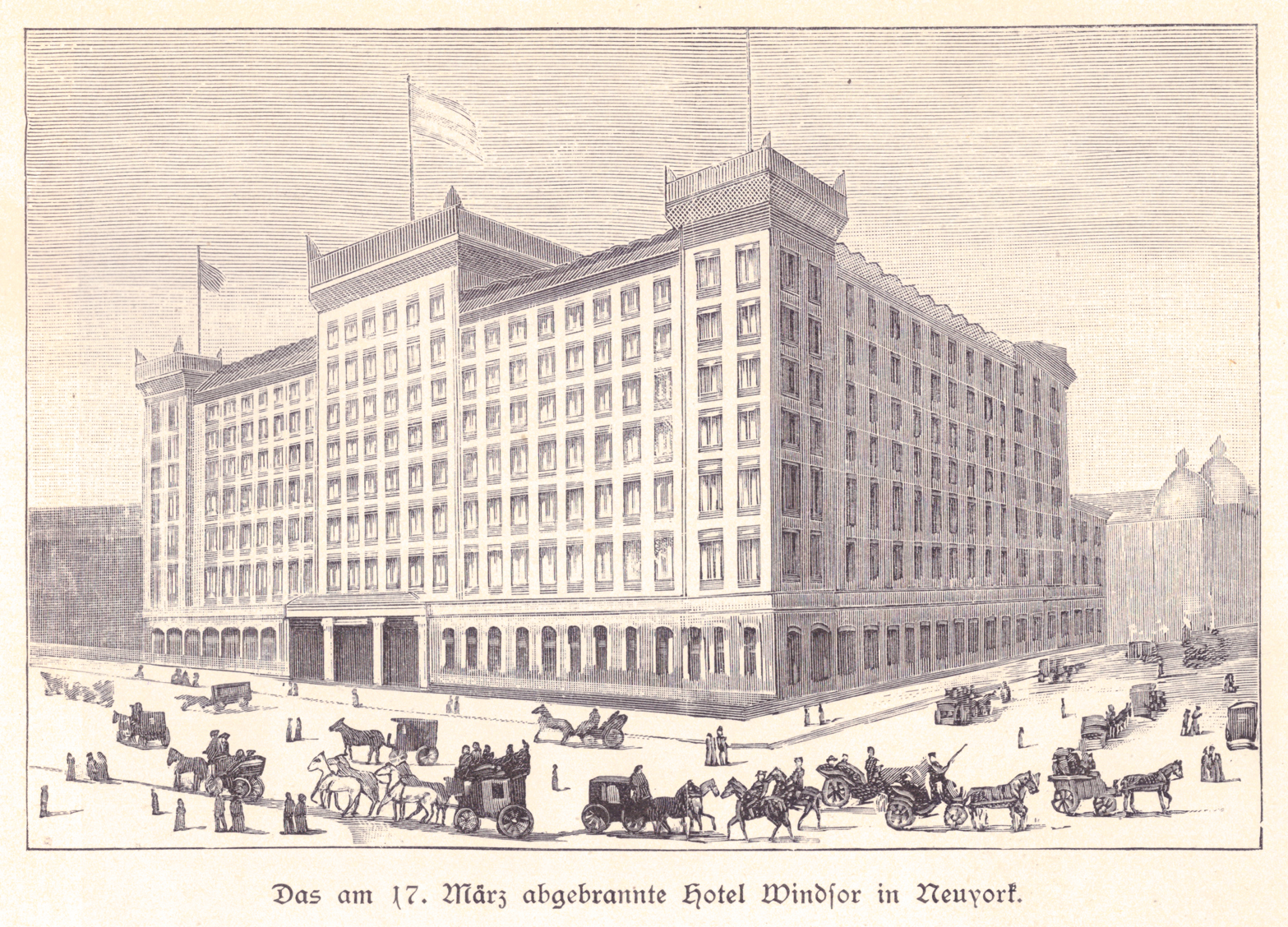
- Windsor Hotel, before 1899

General information
- Status: Destroyed by fire
- Location: Manhattan, New York City
- Opened: 1873
- Demolished: 1899

The Windsor Hotel fire occurred on March 17, 1899. The hotel located at 575 Fifth Avenue (at the corner of East 47th Street) in Manhattan, New York City, New York, US. The seven-story hotel opened in 1873, at a time when hotel residency was becoming popular with the wealthy, and was advertised as "the most comfortable and homelike hotel in New York." It burned down on St. Patrick's Day 1899, with 45 confirmed dead and unidentified body parts attributed to the 41 missing and presumed dead.

== Fire ==
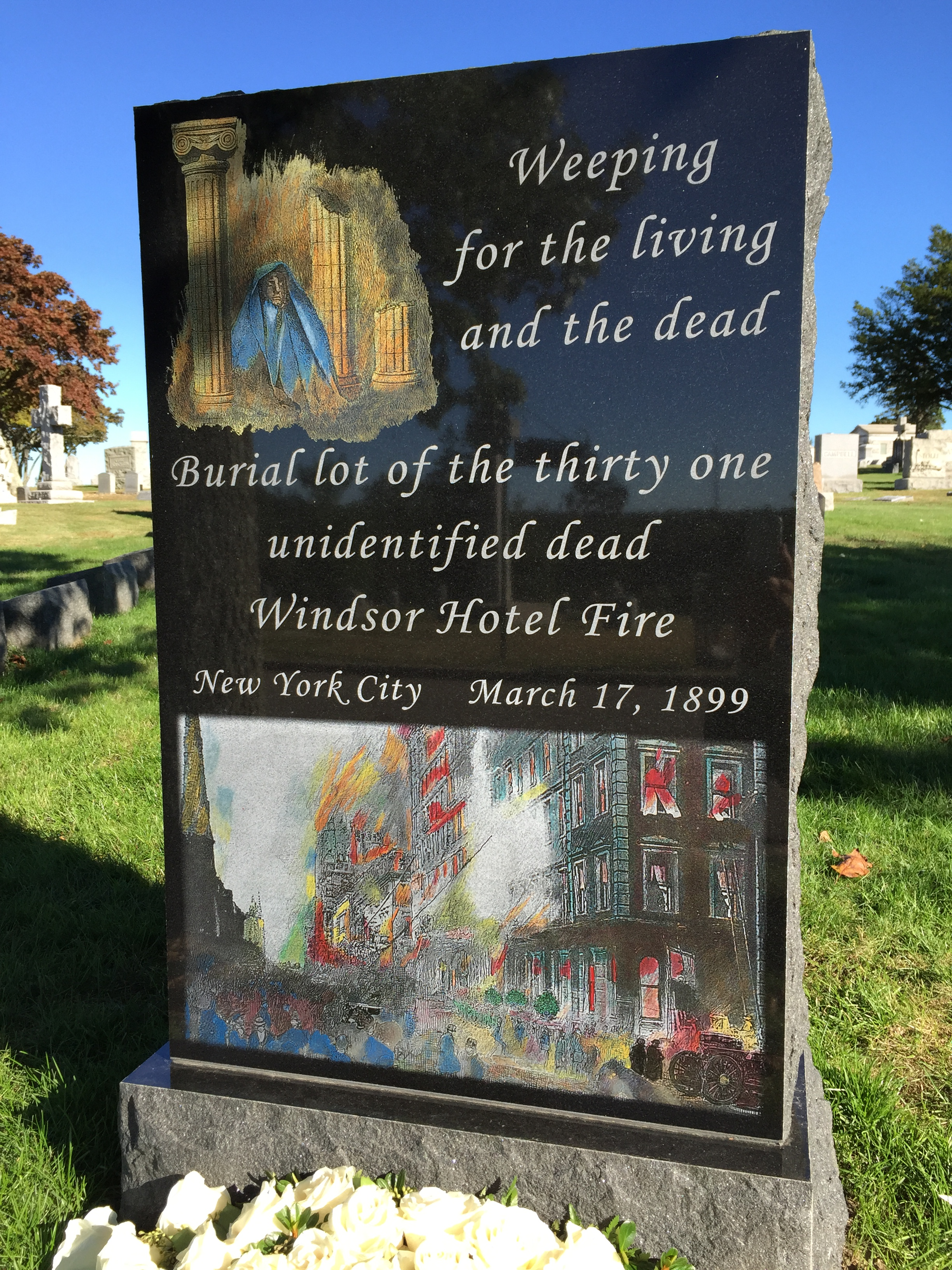
Monument to unidentified fire victims in Kensico Cemetery

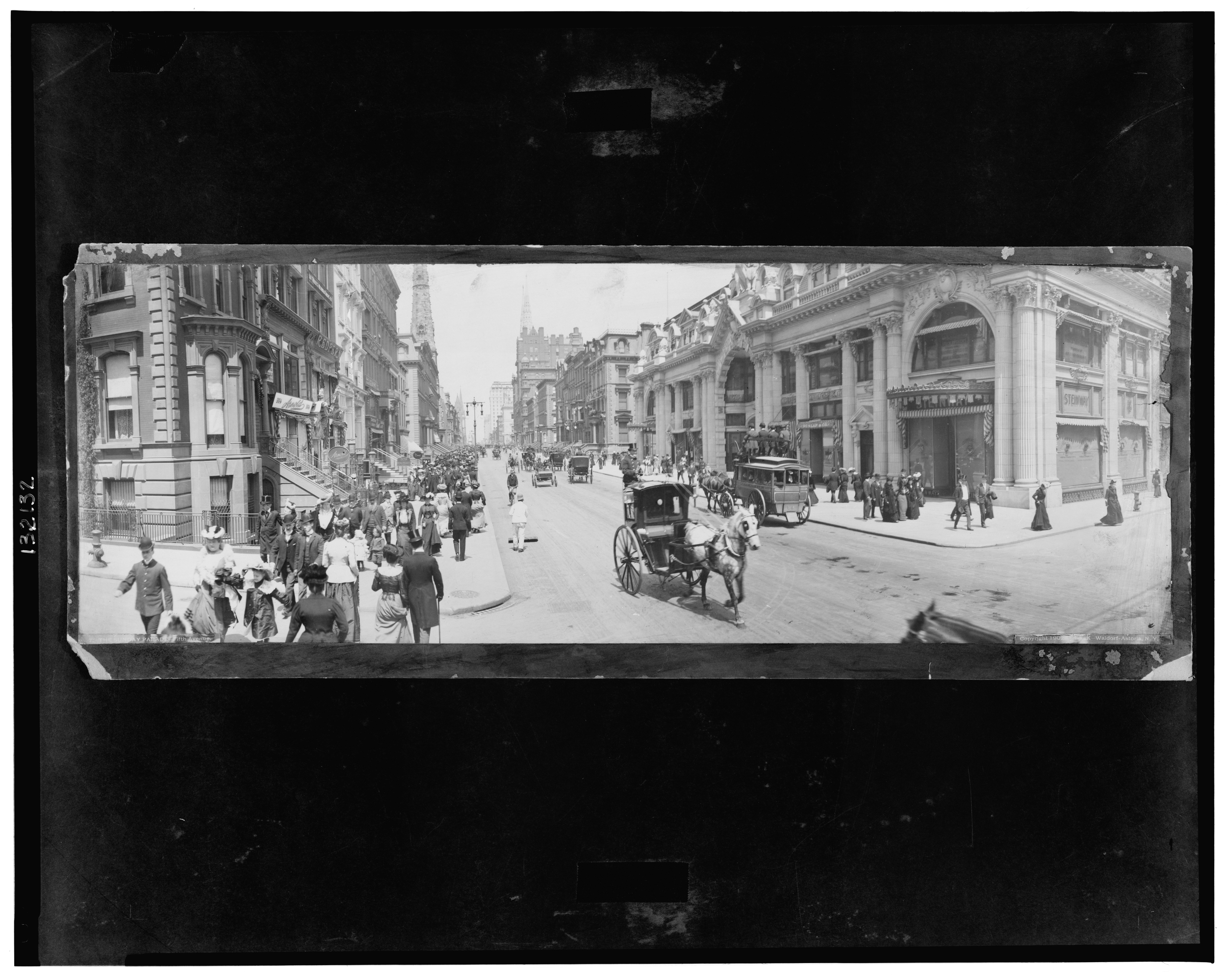
Windsor arcade in 1902, on right

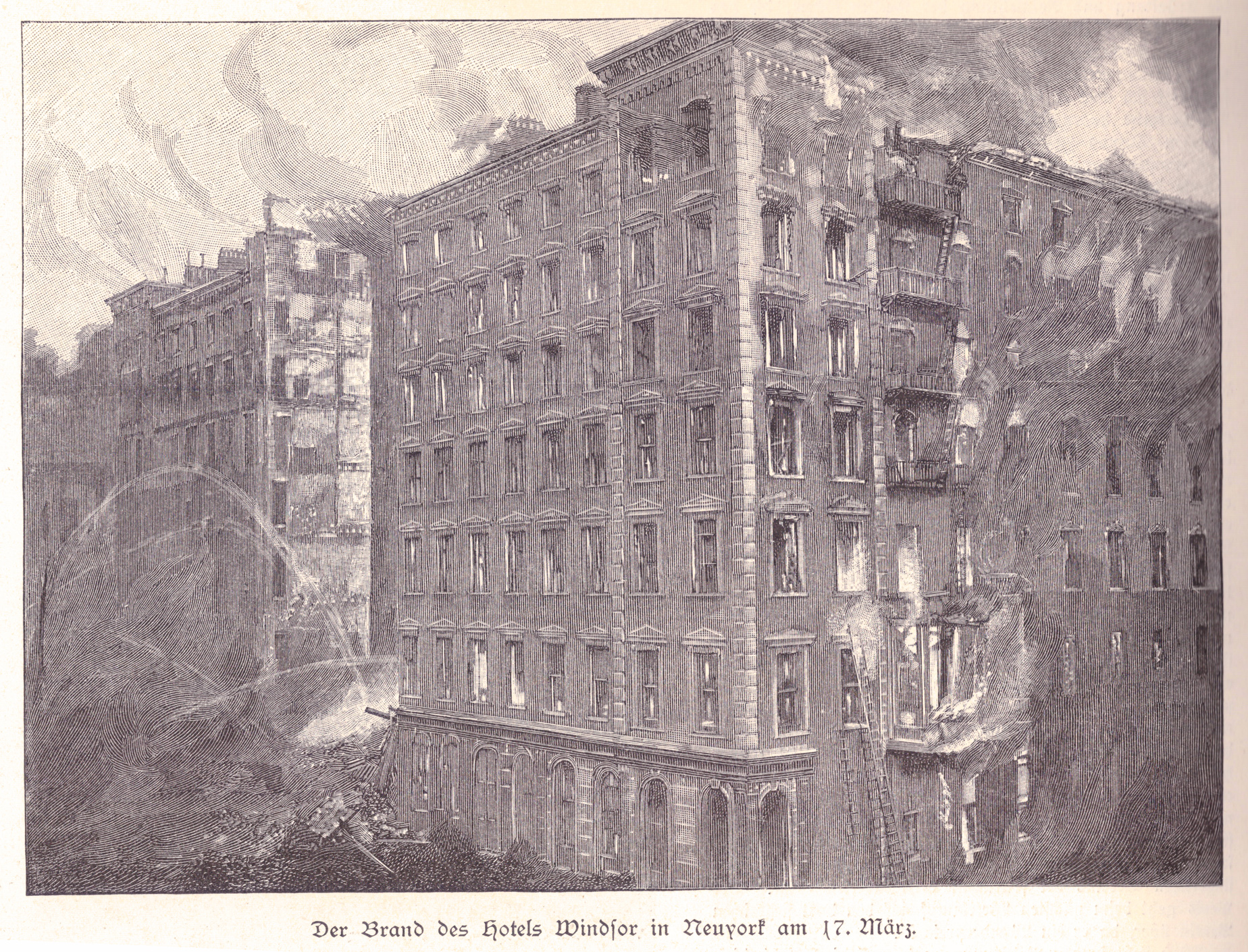
Fire 1899

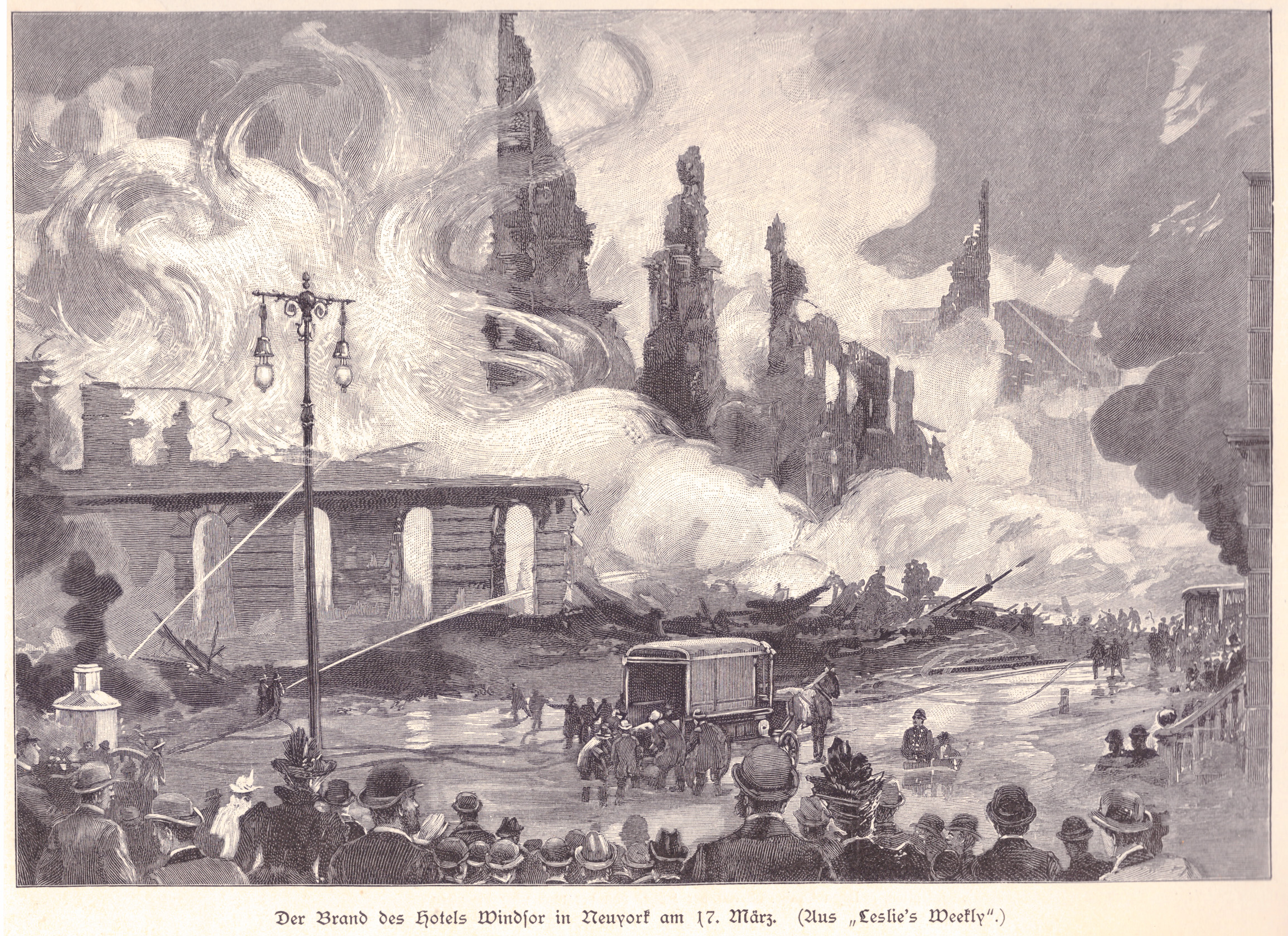
Fire 1899

On St. Patrick's Day 1899, while people were gathered below to watch the parade, a fire destroyed the hotel within 90 minutes. Supposedly the fire started when someone threw an unextinguished match out of a second-floor window and the wind blew it against the lace curtains.

Dora Duncan, leading a dance class in the hotel at the time, managed to get her students, including her daughter, Isadora, to safety. Abner McKinley, President McKinley's brother, who was outside when the alarm was raised, dashed in and rescued his wife and handicapped daughter.

Firemen, some of them still in their dress uniforms from the parade, made heroic rescues, but they were hampered by the crowds; the fire moved too fast for them to reach every window with ladders, and water pressure was inadequate. Almost 90 people died (estimates vary), with numerous bodies landing on the pavement; some people fell when escape ropes burned their hands, while some jumped in preference to being burned alive. The operator of the hotel, Warren F. Leland, was unable to identify his 20-year-old daughter, Helen, who had jumped from the 6th floor.

The following day The New York Times featured the headlines "Windsor Hotel Lies in Ashes" and "The Hotel a Fire Trap." The fire commissioner, Hugh Bonner, blamed the construction of the hotel for the rapid spread of the fire: it did not have the cross walls that by 1899 were required by law. According to some reports, the fire escapes soon became too hot to use; other accounts state that there were none. The Windsor Hotel fire was the inspiration for John Kenlon, who later became fire chief but was a lieutenant in 1899, to become one of the most forceful advocates of a high-pressure hydrant system in New York, which was finally installed in 1907.

== Aftermath ==
The bodies of 31 of the unidentified victims were buried in Kensico Cemetery in Valhalla, New York. A monument to them was dedicated on October 9, 2014.

For a few months after the fire, the landowner, Elbridge Gerry, rented the site for billboards. In 1901, he built the Windsor Arcade, an ornamental building of luxury shops. It was torn down in the 1910s; the buildings that replaced it have also been demolished. The two high-rises now occupying the site, at 565 and 575 Fifth Avenue, have no plaque or marker for the tragedy.

== See also ==
- List of former hotels in Manhattan
