= Wilhelm Detmer =

Wilhelm Detmer (11 March 1850, in Hamburg – 12 December 1930, in Hamburg) was a German botanist, plant physiologist and agriculturalist.

In 1871 he obtained his doctorate from the University of Leipzig, later receiving his habilitation at the University of Jena, where in 1879 he became an associate professor. In 1904-05 he conducted scientific research in Java, publishing Botanische and landwirtschaftliche Studien auf Java (Botanical and agricultural studies on Java, 1907) as a result. In 1923, he was appointed professor of soil science, plant and seed physiology at Jena.

== Written works ==
He was the author of Das pflanzenphysiologische Praktikum (1888), a book later translated into English and published as "Practical Plant Physiology: An Introduction to Original Research for Students and Teachers of Natural Science, Medicine, Agriculture and Forestry" (1898). Other noted works by Detmer include:

- Vergleichende Physiologie des Keimungsprocesses der Samen, 1880 - Comparative physiology on seed germination processes.
- Botanische Wanderungen in Brasilien, 1897 - Botanical excursions in Brazil.
