= Freda Detmers =

American botanist

- Born: January 16, 1867; Dixon, Illinois
- Died: September 5, 1934 (aged 67); Los Angeles, California
- Education: Ohio State University
- Scientific career
- Thesis: Descriptive Catalogue of the Uredinae of Ohio

Frederica "Freda" Detmers (January 16, 1867 – September 5, 1934) was an American botanist.

== Life and education ==
Detmers was born in Dixon, Lee County, Illinois, on January 16, 1867, to Henry Detmers and Heimke. Her father was the founder of the Ohio State University Veterinary College. She studied at the University, graduating in 1887 with a B.S. She returned to graduate with an M.S. in 1891.

She suffered from a head injury after a fall in the mountains collecting plants in 1930.

She committed suicide on September 5, 1934, in Los Angeles by consuming poison.

== Career ==
Detmers was the first woman to hold a research position in Ohio for the Ohio Agricultural Experiment Station, holding it from 1880 to 1892. From 1893 to 1906, she taught science and German in Columbus schools, returning to OSU in 1906. Her 1912 dissertation was a study of Buckeye Lake's ecology. In 1914, she became assistant professor. In 1918, she rejoined the experiment station as assistant botanist, moving on to taxonomist and systematist.

Her research focused on plant pathology problems and weed naturalization and control.

She was a charter member of the Ohio Academy of Science, where in 1918, she served as vice president.

Detmers moved to Los Angeles in 1927, becoming a curator of the University of Southern California herbarium.

Throughout her career she published at least 28 technical paper and articles. One of these being her Ph.D dissertation, An Ecological Study of Buckeye Lake: A Contribution to the phytogeography of Ohio. Her dissertation includes a compilation of historical records that provides great insight into the plant community that formerly existed in that area. This comprehensive study combined data from floristic, ecological, and other view points. This study was the first to combine these topics into one presentation. Thanks to her work, we are left with a better understanding of Ohios ecology, particularly of Buckeye Lake region.

== Partial bibliography ==
- Detmers, Frederica. An Ecological Study of Buckeye Lake. Columbus, Ohio: 1912.
