= Detmer Woolen Company =

The Detmer Woolen Company was founded in 1885 in New York City by Julian Francis Detmer. The business dealt primarily with textile mills in New England. Detmer (December 4, 1865 – November 26, 1958) was a native of Cleveland, Ohio who came to New York City and started a woolens wholesale and importing firm. He was president of Detmer & Moore, Detmer & Richter, the Detmer Woolen Company, and Detmer, Bruner and Mason.

== Company history ==
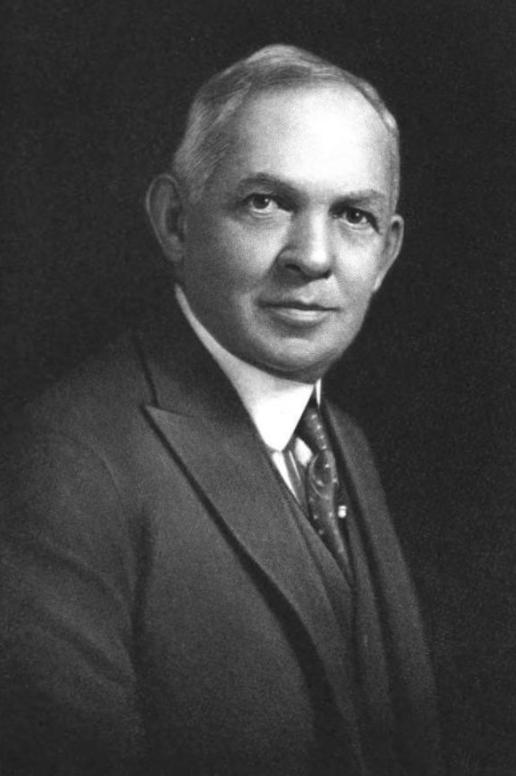
Julian Francis Detmer

The Detmer Woolen Company maintained offices in the Parker Building, New York City when the structure burned in January 1908. The fire which destroyed the edifice began in the Detmer offices on the fourth floor.

In late April 1909 the business leased 11,685 square feet (1,085.6 m^{2}) of floor space from the Bush Terminal Company on the fourth floor of Loft Building No. 3 at the foot of Thirty-Seventh Street, in South Brooklyn, New York. Detmer Woolen maintained its Manhattan, New York offices but removed its entire inventory of stock to its new Brooklyn headquarters.

In July 1915 customs officials won a judgment against the Detmer Woolen Company. The ruling involved a discrepancy in the classification of woven fabrics made of silk and wool. The importers claimed a duty of 35% which was challenged and reversed to the amount of 45%. The Detmer Woolen Company failed to request a commission to study the construction of cloth in the factory abroad. The 10% extra duty resulted from the primary value of the fabric being adjudged to be silk rather than worsted cloth.

In October 1918 the Federal Reserve Bank of New York noted that the Detmer Woolen Company accounted for $50,000 of the district's $1,375,331,000 in subscriptions to the Fourth Liberty Loan war bond selling campaign.

== Founder's demise ==
Julian Francis Detmer retired from the woolens business in 1935. He lived until the fall of 1958, and died just a few days before what would have been his ninety-third birthday. His legacy includes the establishment of the Detmer Nurseries (arboretums) near his home in Tarrytown, New York. The gardens were destroyed in 1968 and 1974 as part of a commercial residential development project.
