= Parker Building (New York City) =

Coordinates: 40.738°N 73.988°W

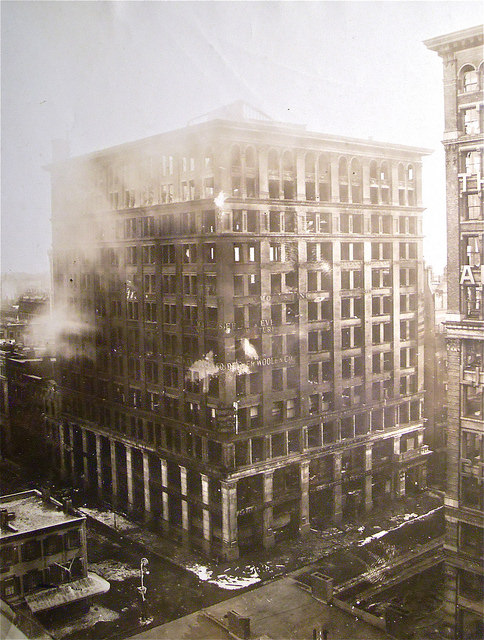

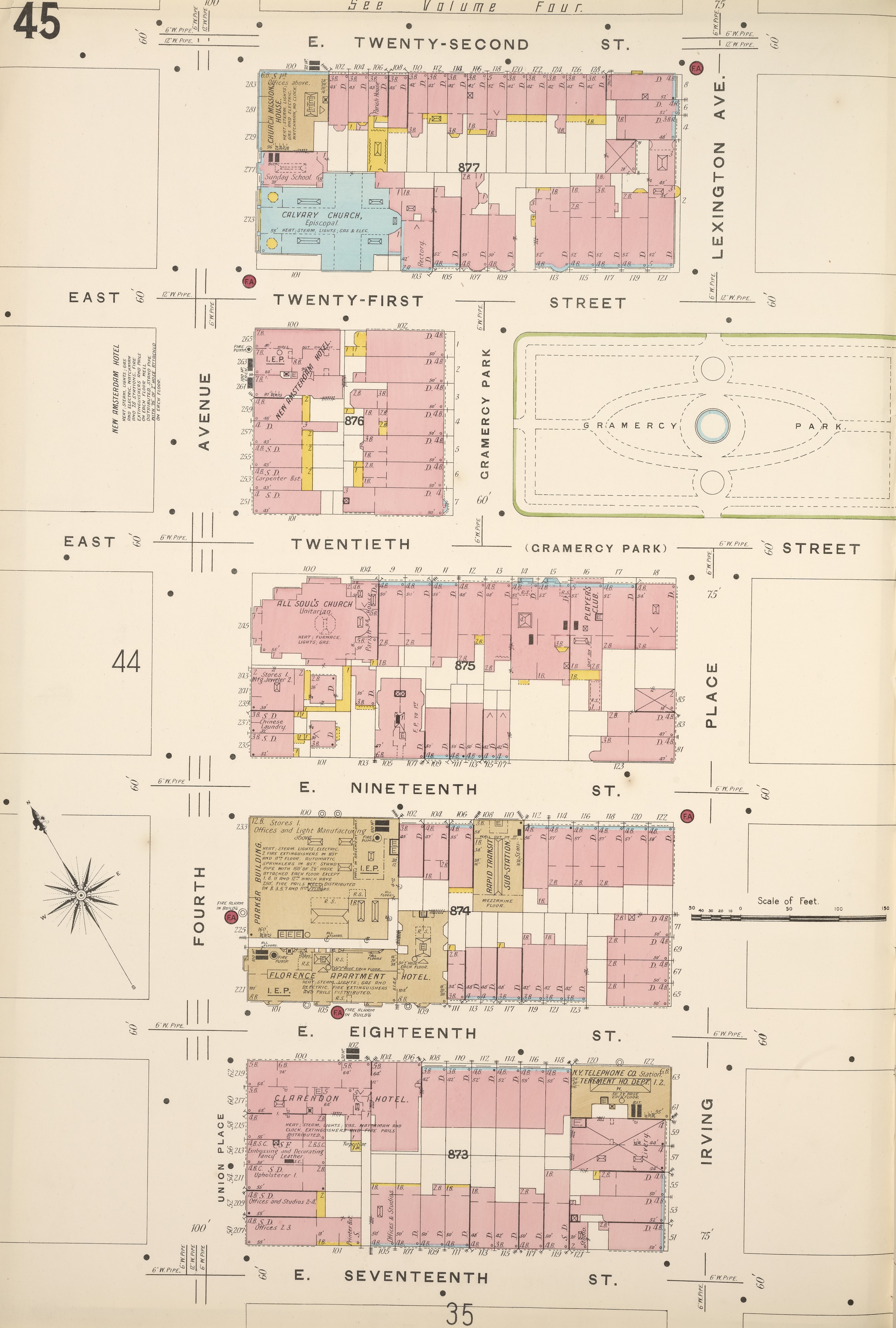
The Parker Building and its neighborhood on a map published in 1903

The Parker Building was a 12-story office and loft structure completed in 1900 at the southeast corner of Fourth Avenue (later Park Avenue South) and 19th Street, in Manhattan, New York City. The edifice occupied ground which was formerly the site of the Gettysburg Cyclorama structure.

== Insurance company property ==
In 1902 the Parker Building was acquired by the Metropolitan Life Insurance Company. The acquisition was brokered by Frank E. Smith through John F. Hollingsworth. The latter accepted the Westminster Hotel, at Irving Place, as partial payment. The aggregate mortgage on the Parker Building at the time was $900,000.

== Temporary art gallery ==
Government experts appraised paintings and statuary from the Don Marcello Massaranti collection of Italian art on the 10th floor of the Parker Building in July 1902. As of August 1904 the art collection continued to be exhibited there. Henry Walters bought the collection for $1,000,000 in Rome, Italy, in 1902. He eventually moved the art to his own gallery at Charles and Centre Streets in Baltimore, Maryland. The building was designed by architects Delano and Aldrich of New York City. It became the Walters Art Museum.

== Business records ==
The Parker Building was sold by the John H. Parker Company through the C.E. Harrell & Company. The Parker Building was purchased by a group of Chicago capitalists for a price between $1,700,000 and $1,800,000. It was located on a large plot measuring 131 by 150 feet in size. The land it occupied was owned by the Matthews estate and passed into the hands of the Cameron Company in 1897. The Parker Company paid some $700,000 for the ground in August 1899.

In October 1900 C.E. Harrell & Company leased approximately 30,000 feet of floor space in the Parker Building to the Kay Scheerer Company, a seller of surgical instruments and hospital supplies.

== Destroyed by fire ==
The Parker Building and the adjacent Florence Hotel were burned irreparably by a fire which began on the sixth floor of the Parker Building, on January 10, 1908. A night watchman discovered the flames in rooms occupied by the Detmer Woolen Company. The hotel was separated from the Parker Building by a narrow alley measuring fifteen feet. The conflagration began around 7 p.m., and by 11 p.m. the Parker Building was gutted.

It was erroneously reported that the fire was started by members of an Armenian Hunchakist sect which was targeting the A & M Karagheusian company, a rug importing firm, located on the fourth floor of the Parker Building. Mihran Karagheusian was threatened by Parseg Nevrovzyan several months prior to the fire. Nevrovzyan vowed to inflict $200,000 in damages to the Karagheusian business, but did not name the Parker Building in making his threat. Nevrovzyan was arrested. He promised to reveal to the Turkish government a revolutionary plot which he claimed Karagheusian's brother, Arshag, was interested in. Arshag resided in Constantinople.
