= A. M. Detmer House =

Historic house in Ohio, United States

- U.S. National Register of Historic Places
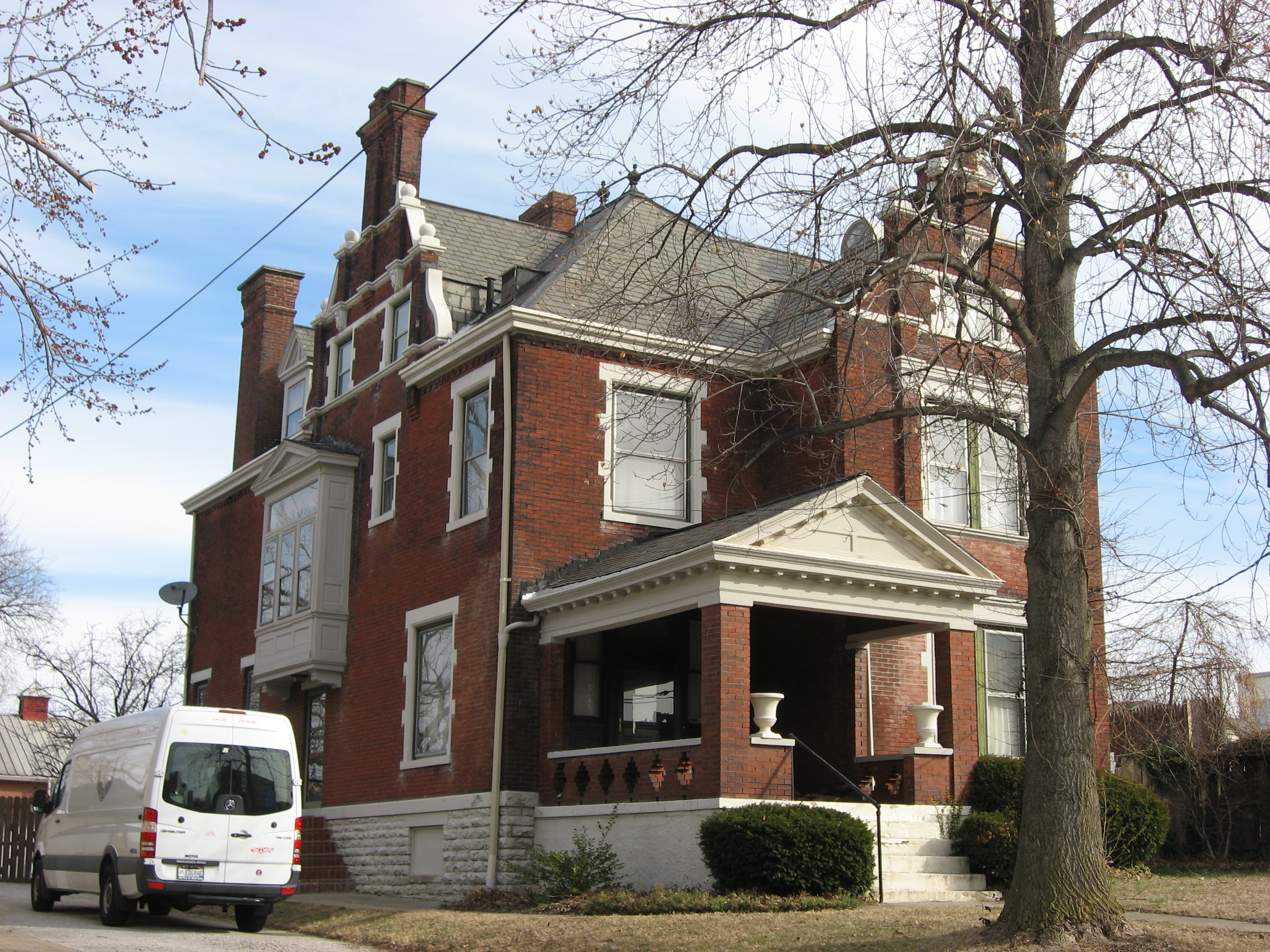
- Front of the house

- Location within Ohio Location within the United States
- Location: 1520 Chapel St., Cincinnati, Ohio
- Coordinates: 39°7′51″N 84°28′48″W
- Area: Less than 1 acre (0.40 ha)
- Built: 1885
- Architect: Samuel Hannaford
- Architectural style: Late Victorian, Eclectic Victorian
- MPS: Samuel Hannaford and Sons TR in Hamilton County
- NRHP reference No.: 80003046
- Added to NRHP: March 3, 1980

The A.M. Detmer House is a historic residence in Cincinnati, Ohio, United States. Constructed in the 1880s, it has been named a historic site as an example of the work of a prominent architect.

Amadeus M. Detmer was a leading member of the firm of Warburg and Company, which was located at Sixth and Main Streets downtown; it did business as a "merchant tailor", serving high-end buyers of custom clothing. Detmer had the house built in 1885, choosing leading Cincinnati architect Samuel Hannaford to produce the design; Hannaford had become prominent because of his design for Music Hall in the 1870s, and by 1885 he was approaching the end of his time in independent practice.

Detmer's house is a brick building constructed on a stone foundation. Rather than exemplifying a single architectural style, the house is eclectic. Among its prominent components are a trio of parapets mixing the roles of gables and dormer windows, constructed in a Flemish Revival style; a porch with Doric columns underneath a pediment, constructed around the main entrance; and numerous corbelled chimneys. Two bays wide, the facade includes stringcourses of limestone as part of its Flemish Revival parapet, along with small finials; together with the chimneys and the steep hip roof, the parapets help to lend the house the appearance of height greater than its actual two and a half stories.

In 1980, the A.M. Detmer House was listed on the National Register of Historic Places; it qualified for inclusion due to its well-preserved historic architecture. Nearly 40 other properties in Cincinnati and other parts of Hamilton County, including 14 other houses, were added to the Register at the same time as part of a multiple property submission of buildings designed by Samuel Hannaford and/or his sons. The Detmer House is significantly newer than some of the houses included in this group, for the oldest of Hannaford's residential designs in the city was constructed in 1862.
