= Hugh Bonner =

6th New York City Fire Commissioner
- In office February 10, 1908 – March 13, 1908
- Preceded by: Francis J. Lantry
- Succeeded by: Nicholas J. Hayes

Personal details
- Born: June 14, 1839 Ireland
- Died: March 13, 1908 (aged 68) New York, New York, US

Hugh Bonner (June 14, 1839 – March 13, 1908) was the sixth New York City Fire Commissioner.

== Biography ==
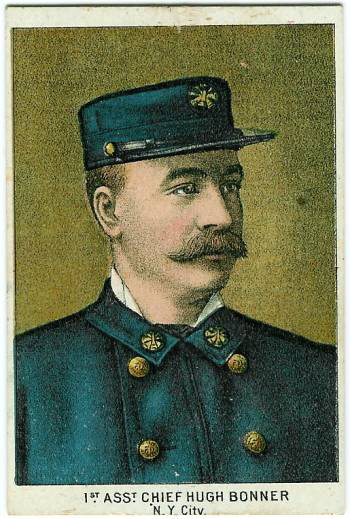
On a cigarette card

Hugh Bonner was born in Ireland on June 14, 1839.

In 1904, after having served as fire chief of the New York City Fire Department, Bonner moved to the Philippines (at that time, an American territory), where he was the fire chief of Manila. Upon returning to the United States, he was appointed the 6th Fire Commissioner of the City of New York by Mayor George B. McClellan Jr. on February 10, 1908, and served in that position until his death a month later, on March 13, 1908.

Fire appointments
Preceded by Francis J. Lantry	FDNY Commissioner; 1908	Succeeded by Nicholas J. Hayes
