= Albert Seedman =

American law enforcement officer

Chief of Detectives Albert Seedman
- Seedman speaking to the media in 1971
- Born: August 9, 1918; Bronx, New York, U.S.
- Died: May 17, 2013 (aged 94); Delray Beach, Florida, U.S.
- Education: Baruch College
- Police career
- Country: U.S.
- Allegiance: U.S.
- Department: New York City Police Department
- Service years: 1942–1972
- Status: Deceased
- Rank: Captain, Detective, Chief Detective for South Brooklyn, Chief of Detectives
- Awards: Chevalier of the Legion d'honneur
- Other work: Chief of Security for Alexander's department-store chain; wrote memoir, Chief!

Albert A. Seedman (August 9, 1918 – May 17, 2013) was an officer with the New York City Police Department (NYPD) for 30 years, known for solving several high-profile cases before resigning as chief of the Detective Bureau. He was the only Jewish officer to ever hold that position. After his retirement he was the chief of security for a New York area department store chain before retiring to South Florida.

Seedman established himself as a detective during the 1960s. He investigated many prominent crimes during that era, including the Borough Park Tobacco robbery and the Kitty Genovese murder. As the chief of detectives he reformed that branch by assigning detectives to specialize in certain crimes rather than just investigating whatever cases came their way when they were on shift. His tenure as chief of detectives of the city was short but memorable, marked by the Knapp Commission's corruption investigations which briefly cost him his job, several mob hits, and terror attacks carried out by the Black Liberation Army (BLA). When his superior officers hindered his investigation into the murder of an officer at a Harlem mosque out of fear of racial unrest, Seedman resigned his position and retired from the force, although he did not say that had been the reason for another 40 years.

Frequently and accurately described as "cigar-chomping" and "tough-talking", with a personal style likened by a colleague to a Jewish gangster, he was one of the city's most visible police personnel during the 1960s and early 1970s. Newspapers often included a quote from Chief Seedman; he was frequently on evening television news as well. He was always willing to speak to reporters even if he could not tell them much. After his retirement he wrote Chief!, a memoir of his time on the force and the high-profile cases he had been involved in, and appeared as a detective in the 1975 film Report to the Commissioner with Hector Elizondo and Tony King.

== Early life ==
Seedman was born to a taxi driver and his wife, a sewing machine operator in the Garment District, on Fox Street, near St. Mary's Park in the South Bronx in 1918. He was given no middle name, just the initial "A". In school he served as a stairwell monitor, which he said later gave him the idea to become a police officer.

Seedman grew up in one of the toughest neighborhoods in the borough, with many Irish American street gangs. Seedman did not get involved with them, however. "It was a Jewish block", he recalled, "and Jewish kids didn't fight."

After finishing high school he attended the business school at City College of New York, now Baruch College. Upon graduating in 1941 with a degree in accounting, he joined the New York City Transit Police because civil service paid higher salaries than any private-sector jobs available at that time, and police agencies paid the most. After studying French for a year, he left the department to serve in Army intelligence and the military police in France and Belgium, including the Battle of the Bulge. When World War II ended he rejoined the transit police, and thereafter the NYPD.

== Police career ==
In the late 1940s, there were few Jews in the NYPD and none above the rank of captain. Seedman recalled later in his life that there was some attendant bias. "I didn't get the choice assignments", he said. "I think it was because I was Jewish." He also earned graduate degrees in public administration during this time.

As a detective, Seedman was known for his unorthodox approaches to solving otherwise perplexing cases. "I try to imagine who was in a room the second before the murder," he recalled years later. In one case early in his career, a Bronx woman was found dead of a shotgun blast in the lobby of her apartment building. Seedman noticed an empty chair next to the building's stoop. Neighbors told him it was usually occupied by a man who sat there watching the traffic go by. Although the man normally was out shopping at the time, but Seedman insisted on entering his apartment through a window—where he found his body hanging from a pipe. The murder-suicide had occurred after the woman rejected him.

=== 1962–1971: As detective ===
By 1962, Seedman had become a captain. That year brought him his first media exposure, to the brief detriment of his career. Two officers who had responded to a robbery in progress at the Borough Park Tobacco Company in Brooklyn, where Seedman worked at the time, were killed. It was the first time a pair of NYPD officers had been killed on duty in 30 years. When one of the suspects, Tony Dellernia, was extradited to New York after surrendering in Chicago, Seedman, as was customary, had him perp-walked in front of reporters outside the precinct house.

Seedman holding up Dellernia's face, for which he was reprimanded

Some photographers who arrived late complained to Seedmen. He brought Dellernia back out, but the defendant had his head low. Seedman forced Dellernia's head up and held him by the chin so his face would be visible. The ensuing image of Dellernia's contorted face, "[stretched] ... as if it were pizza dough", as The New York Times put it in 1999, while Seedman posed for the camera himself, sparked widespread public outcry. The American Civil Liberties Union demanded he be disciplined, and he was duly reprimanded after Commissioner Michael J. Murphy publicly expressed regret for the incident. A promotion to deputy inspector Seedman had been expecting was delayed. Dellernia was ultimately acquitted. (Note: In the 2000 case Lauro v. Charles, a federal appeals court ruled that perp walks restaged for the media were unconstitutional violations of the subject's privacy.) Seedman nevertheless displayed the photo on his office wall in his Long Island home.

Two years later, Seedman came back into the public eye when he led the investigation into the murder of Kitty Genovese in the Queens neighborhood of Kew Gardens. The case had gained national attention when a story in the Times alleged that 38 neighbors had witnessed the crime in progress but did nothing about it, even as Genovese screamed for help repeatedly (an account that has since been disputed). Seedman's detectives arrested the killer, Winston Moseley, six days later. The death sentence he originally received was commuted when New York abolished the death penalty for most murders, and Moseley served the remaining 52 years of his life in prison.

In mid-1967, Seedman, then chief detective for southern Brooklyn, made his reputation as an investigator who could solve baffling cases. While driving on the Belt Parkway one summer morning near Plum Beach, a young woman named Nancy McEwen suddenly drifted off the road onto the median strip. A police lieutenant in the car behind her pulled over to see what the problem was. He found her moaning, with her head slumped forward, and called for an ambulance. She died a short time later at Coney Island Hospital, where doctors found a small hole on the side of her head that turned out to have been caused by a bullet. Since only one window in McEwen's car was open, and none of them had been shattered, Seedman believed the shot had to have been fired from Sheepshead Bay or the nearby area, and that due to the distance and the car's speed, it was probably not intentional. He ordered detectives and uniformed officers to search the dunes and marshes for a possible shell casing. After 2,400 people were interviewed and several other leads came to nothing, he pointed at a spot on the map and told his detectives to look for people who owned boats. That led to the shooter—a local gas station owner who had been on his boat that morning taking target practice at a floating beer can. One of his bullets had ricocheted off the water's surface and killed McEwen. A grand jury ruled it an accident, and no homicide charges were brought, although the shooter was fined $100 for violating firearms laws with the rifle.

==== Greenwich Village townhouse explosion ====
On April 6, 1970, a townhouse on West 11th Street in Greenwich Village exploded in the early afternoon, damaging not only itself but several adjacent buildings, including the home of actor Dustin Hoffman and his wife. Responding firefighters at first believed it to be a gas explosion resulting from a leak and accidental ignition, but the senior responding detective was suspicious and called Seedman to the scene, where he set up a command post along with senior fire department officials and the FBI. Seedman's suspicions were deepened by reports that known survivors of the blast had left the scene and not returned.

Seedman contacted radio executive James Wilkerson, the owner of the property. He learned that Wilkerson was planning to return from a vacation in the Caribbean that day; in the meantime his daughter Cathy had been staying there, recuperating from a bout with the flu. Cathy was known to the FBI to be a member of the Weathermen, a radical left-wing activist group, and had been arrested at several demonstrations over the last two years. Seedman concluded that the explosion had been perhaps deliberately set, but did not know what the motive might have been other than Cathy Wilkerson's relationship with her father, from whom she was estranged.

It took the fire department until after sunset to extinguish most of the fire. In the rubble police found two dismembered bodies, weapons, and enough dynamite to level the entire block if it had gone off; after the block was evacuated yet more was found, along with an antitank weapon. Seedman told the media it was the largest explosive device ever found in Manhattan. He asked James Wilkerson and his wife, now returned, to appear on television and appeal to Cathy to at least let the police know whether they had found all the explosives and bodies. Cathy never did. She and other Weathermen remained at large for most of the 1970s before surrendering to authorities; she was the only one to serve prison time. The Greenwich Village explosion had been an accident that killed three, resulting from the inexperienced leadership of the New York Weather cell attempting to build a bomb they intended to set off at an Army non-commissioned officers' dance at Fort Dix that night, an attack intended to bring the Vietnam War to the American home front.

=== 1971–72: Chief of detectives ===
In 1971, Seedman became chief of detectives for the department. He was the first, and as of 2020 only, Jewish officer to hold that position, (Note: A few years earlier, Sanford Garelik had become the department's first Jewish chief inspector, at the time its highest uniformed position.) which had usually, like many of the NYPD's other high-ranking positions, gone to the Irish Americans who made up the bulk of the ranks. "The Jewish cop was an alien in an Irish universe," crime novelist Jerome Charyn recalled in 2004.

Enter Albert Seedman, the first, last and only Jewish chief of detectives. It's the 1970s and Chief Seedman is all over the place, tough, flamboyant and foul-mouthed, chomping on a cigar, appearing at the scene of important crimes. He seemed more Irish than the Irish, as if he had co-opted their territory, their language, their domain.

Seedman's personal, trademark style made him stand out. He complemented his cigar with white-on-white patterned shirts with "Al" monogrammed on the sleeves, elaborate rings on both hands including an onyx pinky ring, and a pearl-handled revolver as his weapon. "[He is] what a Jewish gangster is supposed to look like," one fellow detective told The New York Times. "I didn't do any of this stuff consciously, but it was my style," Seedman explained late in his life. "I've been referred to as the last of the old-time Broadway-style detectives." "He's got style; he's the way cops like to see themselves," another officer said to the Times in 1972.

Reporters liked him because he was always willing to talk to them on the record, even if he could not say much. He was the department's preferred spokesperson for what it called "front-page crimes." Of the department's senior commanders, the same detective who praised Seedman's style in the Times said, "[he's t]he only one who comes across on the tube—and in a media age you must have a guy like that."

As chief, he began to modernize the detective bureau, which at nearly 3,000 officers was larger than all but 12 American police departments. During his career, detectives had traditionally worked whatever cases developed from crimes reported during their shifts at the precinct house. Under Seedman, following a practice already adopted by the Chicago and Los Angeles police departments, they were instead assigned to specialize in a particular category of crime, such as homicide or robbery. Patrol officers were also permitted to investigate some lesser crimes on their own, such as assaults or car thefts; by 1972 they were already handling 70 percent of the reported burglary cases. Commissioner Patrick V. Murphy called it "the first major change in the force in half a century."

The department's internal affairs were receiving attention from outside as well. After a 1970 New York Times story, prompted by the revelations of Frank Serpico, alleged that widespread corruption in the department was tolerated or ignored by commanders and the mayor's office, Mayor John V. Lindsay appointed what became known as the Knapp Commission, after Judge Whitman Knapp, who headed it, to investigate.

The commission found evidence that in 1970, Seedman had accepted a free dinner worth $84.30 ($700 in current dollars) from the New York Hilton Midtown, for himself, his wife and two guests. Since this was relatively minor compared to many of the allegations the commission was investigating, it notified Murphy's office before it began hearings that it would not be raising the check. Murphy, distrustful of the commission and fearing that it had an ulterior motive, sent out a press release announcing that Seedman had been relieved of his position as chief of detectives. After this made headlines on all the city's newspapers, the commissioner reinstated him five days later.

It was a challenging era for the department and its detectives. The city's homicides had almost quadrupled since the late 1950s, with a 30 percent increase in 1970 alone. There were many major crimes to investigate during his tenure. Two high-ranking figures in the city's Mafia were shot. Joseph Colombo Sr. was paralyzed from wounds inflicted by an assassin, himself killed seconds later, at an Italian Unity Day festival he had organized; although the department's investigation concluded the murder was not mob-related, Seedman continued to believe strongly that it had been, even though he admitted it would be difficult to prove. Ten months later, Joe Gallo, another member of the Colombo crime family, believed to have ordered the hit on his boss, was himself killed by gunmen at a Little Italy seafood restaurant. A prominent hotel's safe deposit boxes were robbed by gunmen dressed as guests. Seedman oversaw the investigations, and was the department's face in the media.

==== Black Liberation Army killings of police officers ====
The greatest challenge to the department and its detectives during Seedman's tenure as chief of the bureau was another violent left-wing group, the Black Liberation Army (BLA). An offshoot of the Black Panthers that espoused a more militant and radical philosophy, the BLA staged deadly ambushes on police officers in cities across the country. In New York, their three attacks left four officers dead and two seriously wounded. After one attack, the "Attica Brigade" of the BLA claimed responsibility, a reference to the Attica prison riots the previous year, in which 19 prisoners had died when New York State Police stormed the prison.

After the second attack, in January 1972, senior NYPD officials were wary of publicly attributing the killings to the BLA, or even acknowledging the group's existence. Lindsay had changed his party affiliation from Republican to Democratic the previous year in order to seek the latter party's presidential nomination, and his aides told the police that publicly discussing the investigation of an African American terrorist group, one they considered largely an invention of disgruntled former Black Panthers, dedicated to killing police officers would conflict with the mayor's campaign themes; they also feared exacerbating racial tensions in the city. In his news conference the day after the killings, Seedman downplayed notions that they were the work of the BLA although the police had received mail from them, taking credit and promising more.

But deputy commissioner Robert Daley, the department's press secretary, dissented. He held a news conference of his own, telling the assembled reporters that the two killings were the work of the BLA, and when it did not receive sufficient coverage kept having off the record discussions with individual reporters. In February 1972, Commissioner Murphy held a more detailed media event describing in detail the BLA's activities not just in New York but nationwide.

It was in this context that the incident that ended Seedman's police career occurred.

==== 1972 Harlem mosque incident ====
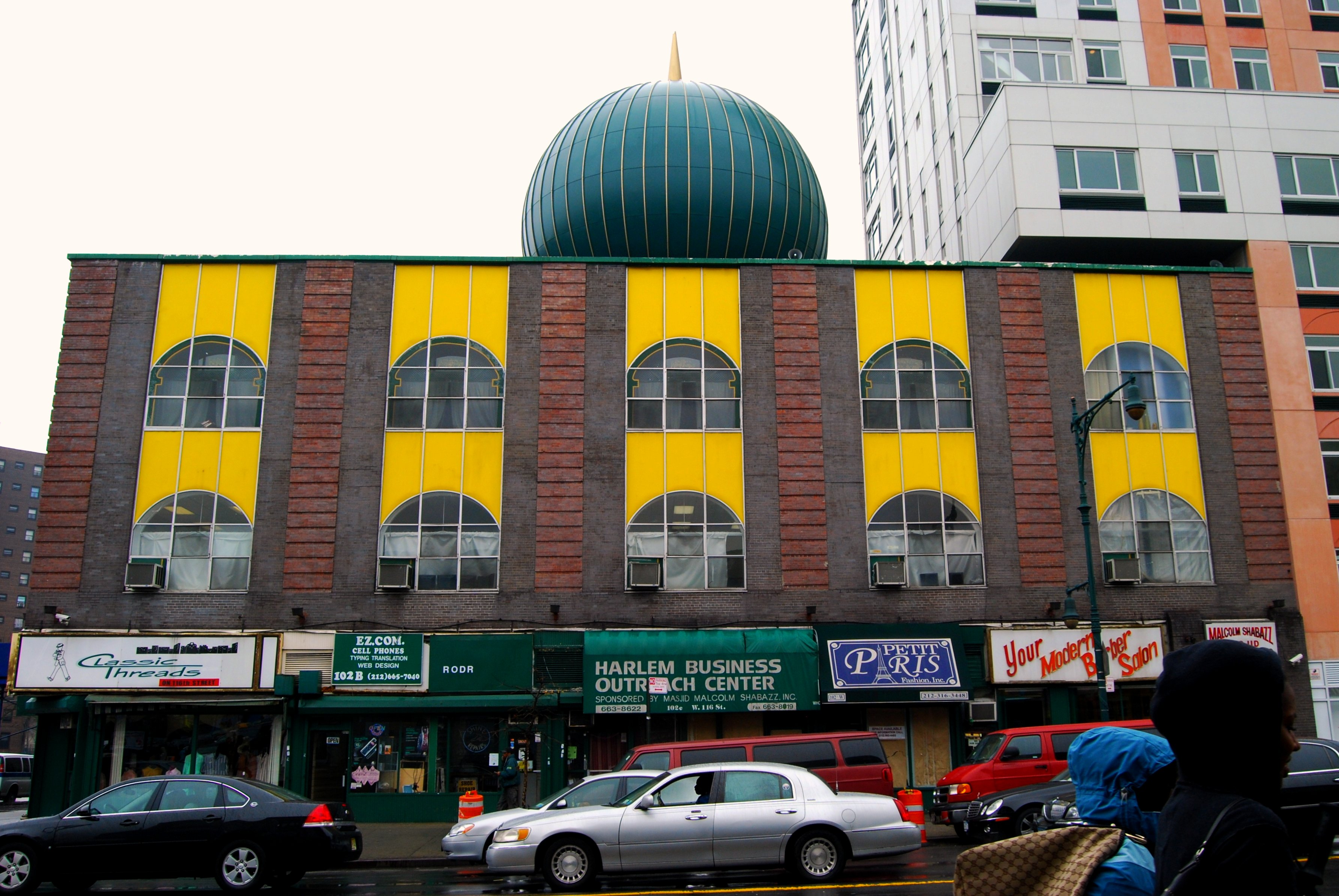
Mosque No. 7 today, known as Malcolm Shabazz Mosque.

On April 14, dispatchers received a 9-1-1 call from a "Detective Thomas", claiming to need assistance at the Nation of Islam's Mosque No. 7 on West 116th Street in Harlem. Five uniformed officers responded; accounts of events at the mosque differ. The police say they were overpowered and assaulted when they arrived; Imam Louis Farrakhan and the other worshippers present say the police interrupted them with guns drawn during prayers and refused repeated requests to wait or at least leave behind their guns, which the Black Muslims' faith forbade from being carried into a place of worship. At a press conference the next day, Farrakhan would claim it was a premeditated attack and the 9-1-1 call just a ruse.

In the ensuing altercation, one officer, Phillip Cardillo, was shot at close range with his own gun. Another officer's gun went missing; it has never been recovered. Police reinforcements arrived, as did the news media, and rumors spread throughout the neighborhood that the police had done something in the mosque they were trying to cover up. An angry and restless crowd had gathered as the police secured the inside of the mosque and tried to figure out what had happened. Two men were arrested and the other worshippers were in custody. Seedman planned to interrogate them when he arrived.

Seedman never got the chance. Farrakhan and newly elected congressman Charles Rangel, who had come to the scene, warned them that the crowd outside, already throwing rocks, assaulting reporters present and attempting to damage police property, was beyond their control. Seedman claimed Rangel offered to have the mosque worshippers show up at the local precinct house if the police left the scene; Rangel has said that he could not, and did not, make such a promise on their behalf.

Seedman reluctantly gave the order to leave the mosque and free the suspects. The police department ordered all white officers to withdraw to several blocks from the mosque. As Seedman walked back to his car, dodging bricks dropped from nearby roofs, he decided to retire, ending his NYPD career two weeks later. At the time, he claimed his retirement was unrelated to the mosque incident; rather, he was attracting too much publicity and the department wanted to focus more on the uniformed patrol officers who made up the bulk of the ranks.

Six days later, Officer Cardillo died in the hospital; his death is the only unsolved killing of an officer in the NYPD's modern history. Many of his colleagues believed the failure to fully investigate it resulted from senior police administrators' political cowardice; at his funeral, which uncharacteristically neither Commissioner Murphy nor Mayor Lindsay attended, Cardillo's commander angrily resigned from the department. An agreement was reached between the department and the mosque that designated it a "sensitive area", where police could not enter without their supervisors; this prevented the collection of ballistic evidence for two years. In its absence, Louis 17X Dupree, (Note: Now known as Khalid Elamin Ali) who an informant had seen standing over Cardillo's body with a gun, was acquitted.

Seedman's role in the police's exit from the mosque was not known until a secret report was released in 1983, as Deputy Commissioner Benjamin Ward, who many officers blamed for the order to withdraw, was on the verge of becoming the city's first African American police commissioner. The secret report, known as the "blue book", indicated that Seedman, not Ward, had given the order. Confronted with this by a Newsday reporter, who wanted to know why he had not ever corrected the record, Seedman said "What good would it have done?" With the truth now known, Ward became commissioner.

Late in his life, Seedman finally revealed why he had given the order. In a new preface to the 2011 e-book release of his 1974 memoir Chief!, he explained what he had kept to himself for four decades. With the tensions outside escalating, he had called Chief Inspector Michael Codd from the mosque and asked for two busloads of police cadets armed with nightsticks to keep order on the street outside. Codd refused and hung up. When Seedman called back he was told that Codd was out to lunch. That failure to support officers in the field had been the real reason for his retirement. He had kept it to himself since "I loved the police department so much that I couldn't drag it through the dirt by saying what those bastards did."

== Post-police career and retirement ==
After retiring from the NYPD, Seedman took a job he had been offered previously as chief of security for the Alexander's department store chain. With journalist Peter Hellman, he wrote Chief!, a memoir of some of the celebrated cases he had worked, such as the Genovese and McEwen deaths. He also appeared as an NYPD detective in the 1975 film Report to the Commissioner, Richard Gere's debut.

He eventually retired from Alexander's before the chain folded in 1992, and moved to Boynton Beach, Florida. He kept a replica of his gold "Chief of Detectives" shield to show people, and told the author of a 2006 book about Jewish police officers that he still carried his pearl-handled revolver "in case there is trouble."

In November 2012, Seedman posted on his Facebook page that French President François Hollande had named him a Chevalier of the Legion of Honour in recognition of his military service there during World War II.

On May 17, 2013, Seedman died of congestive heart failure in Delray Beach, near his Florida home. He was 94.

== Legacy ==
Many younger Jewish officers credited Seedman's visibility with encouraging their career choice. "They joined the force after reading about me in the papers," crime novelist Jerome Charyn recalls Seedman saying. His own brother Harvey, a tough streetfighter in childhood, became a detective who served under Seedman, and his son Howard followed him into the force, an uncommon pattern in families of Jewish NYPD officers. Charyn credits this to the "mythical toughness" Seedman projected.

Charyn tried to capture that quality in a character he modeled on Seedman. Barney "Cowboy" Rosenblatt, a detective in his novel Marilyn the Wild, carries a Colt revolver with his name and rank engraved near the trigger in a holster with small tassels, like Buffalo Bill. Charyn's narrator describes him as "the number-one Jew cop in the City of New York."

In September 2019 several news outlets reported on the NYPD's longest serving officer, chaplain Rabbi Alvin Kass, who was hired by Seedman. "He really wasn't sure who the right one was," he said. "But he saw me about to play a game of handball and he figured 'a rabbi who plays handball. That's the kind of guy that ought to be the chaplain for the New York City Police Department.'"

== See also ==
- List of New York City Police Department officers
