= Randy Jurgensen =

American actor

- Born: Harlem, New York City, NY
- Occupations: Police detective, author, film actor, producer
- Years active: 1958-1978
- Organization: NYPD
- Known for: Investigation the Phil Cardillo murder
- Notable work: Author, "Circle of Six"
- Spouse: Lynn
- Children: Devon Jurgensen (Manager and Co-Producer), Randy, Jarrod, Lindsay

Randy Jurgensen (born December 7, 1933) is a former American NYPD detective, best known as the lead investigator into the murder of patrolman Phil Cardillo as well as his contribution as a consultant on various film and TV projects.

== Early life and career ==
Jurgenson was born in 1933 to Elizabeth and Randolf Jurgenson in Harlem, NY. He was a childhood friend of legendary stand-up comedian George Carlin

He served in the U.S. Army as a paratrooper and was in the Battle of Pork Chop Hill in the Korean War. He was decorated with three bronze stars and a purple heart. After serving in the Army, he entered the New York Police Department in 1958 as a patrolman and was quickly promoted to detective.

In the early 1960s, Jurgensen and his partner performed undercover work to investigate homosexual murders in New York City. Homosexuals were being targeted by two perpetrators who posed as police officers. This investigation was inspiration for the film Cruising, with Al Pacino playing his character.

He worked undercover investigating members of the Black Liberation Army. At one point, the BLA placed a $50,000 bounty on his head, which is believed to still exist today. From 1973 to 1976, he led the Investigation into the murder of Officer Phil Cardillo. He was forced to retire from the NYPD, pleading nolo contendere to a series of charges brought up on by the NYPD.

While still a detective for the NYPD, he began working on films as a consultant. He transitioned to a career in film acting and production and has appeared in more than 30 films.

== 1972 Harlem mosque incident ==
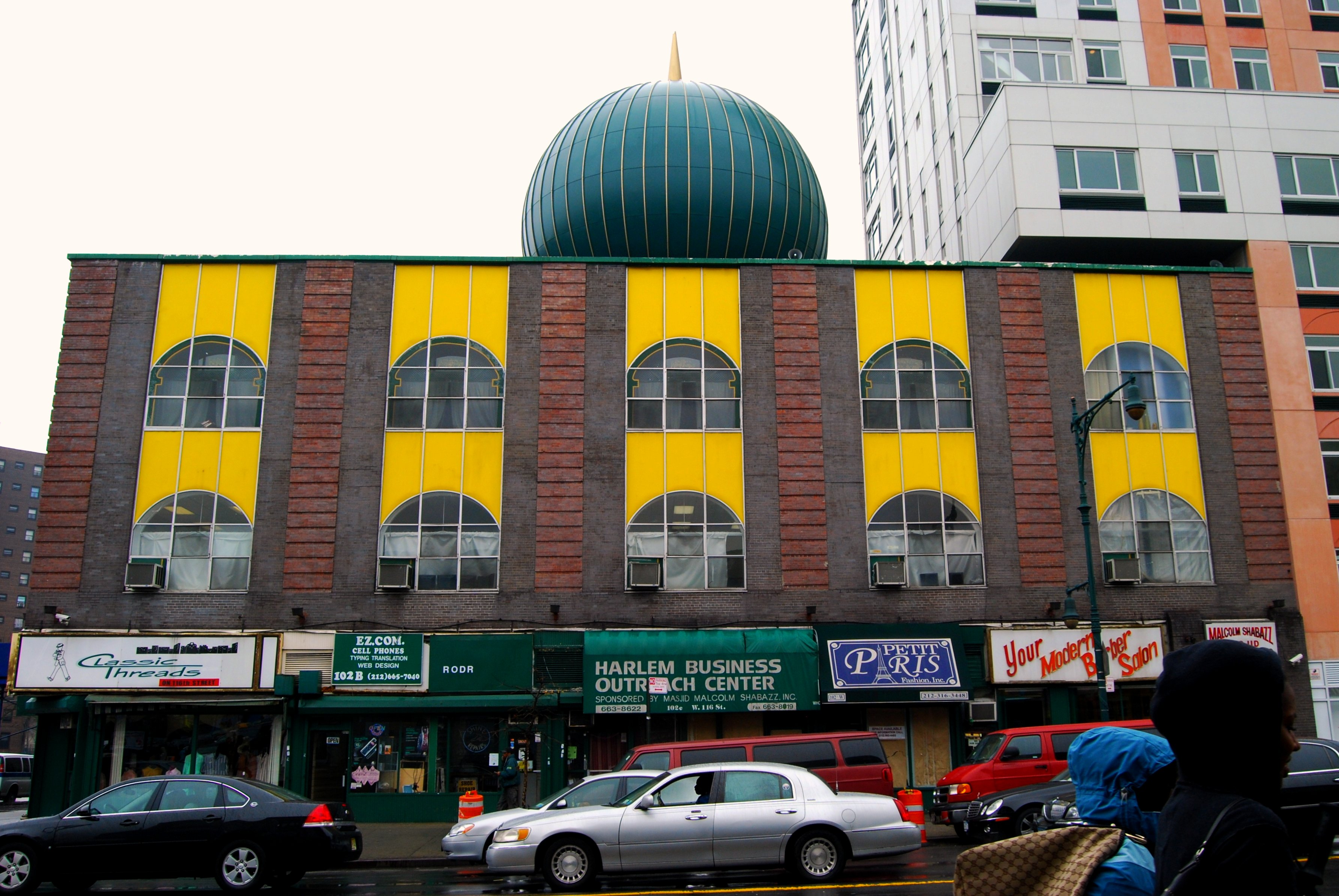
Mosque No. 7 today, known as Malcolm Shabazz Mosque.

On April 14, 1972, dispatchers received a 9-1-1 call from a "Detective Thomas", claiming to need assistance at the Nation of Islam's Mosque No. 7 on West 116th Street in Harlem. Five uniformed officers responded. What happened next is still in dispute. The police say they were overpowered and assaulted when they arrived; When additional officers arrived, a melee ensued, in which Officer Cardillo was shot at point-blank range, and several officers were seriously injured.

Imam Louis Farrakhan and the other worshippers present at the Nation of Islam Mosque say the police interrupted them with guns drawn during prayers, and refused repeated requests to wait or at least leave their guns, which their faith forbade to be carried into a place of worship, outside. At a press conference the next day, he would claim it was a premeditated attack and the 9-1-1 call just a ruse.

=== Original investigation ===
Jurgensen was assigned the case in 1974 after the initial investigator Basil "Sleepy" Slepwitz retired. Numerous obstacles were placed in his way. Most notably, he was not allowed to visit the actual crime scene. He requested that any detective from other precincts notify him when any Muslim in the city was arrested. This was done so that he could interview the arrestee with the hopes that there might be a connection to others who were in the Mosque at the time of the shooting. After years of fruitless interviews, he got his break when Foster 2X Thomas was arrested on a credit card fraud charge. Thomas was a baker at the Mosque and present on the day of the Cardillo murder. Thomas eventually testified at the murder trial of Lewis 17X Dupree, who was acquitted after two trials.

=== Second investigation ===
In 2006, Jurgensen published his first book, Circle of Six, which is a recount of the Mosque incident and subsequent investigation. After the book was released, NYPD Commissioner Ray Kelly launched a new investigation. Kelly was an NYPD sergeant at the time of the mosque occurrence and knew Jurgensen. In 2012, the NYPD announced that the investigation had yielded no new evidence.

=== Campaign to honor Cardillo ===
Jurgensen was active in the campaign to have a street in New York City renamed after Patrolman Cardillo, which was eventually achieved in 2015 when the street in front of the Police Academy in Queens was renamed 'Patrolman Philip Cardillo Way'.

== Film career ==
Jurgensen began working as a technical consultant in the film industry, while a detective for the NYPD. His work has been instrumental in the creation of notable films such as The French Connection, Donnie Brasco and Cruising.

=== Filmography ===
- 1971: The French Connection - Police Sergeant
- 1972: The Godfather - Sonny's Killer #1 (uncredited)
- 1973: Mr. Inside/Mr. Outside - Detective
- 1973: Badge 373 - Detective (uncredited)
- 1973: Cops and Robbers - Randy
- 1973: The Seven-Ups - Detective (uncredited)
- 1975: Report to the Commissioner - Detective (uncredited)
- 1976: God Told Me To - Detective Squad
- 1977: Sorcerer - Vinnie
- 1977: The Godfather: A Novel for Television - Sonny's Killer #1 (uncredited)
- 1977: Contract on Cherry Street - Al Jenner
- 1978: To Kill a Cop - Digillo
- 1978: Bloodbrothers - Randy
- 1978: The Brink's Job - FBI agent #1
- 1978: Superman - Officer 3 (Metropolis)
- 1980: Cruising - Det. Lefransky
- 1980: Maniac - First Cop
- 1981: See China and Die - 1st Detective
- 1981: Fort Apache, The Bronx - Cop at Bar
- 1982: Still of the Night - Car Thief
- 1983: Vigilante - Det. Russo
- 1984: Violated - Police Sergeant
- 1995: Homicide: Life on the Street (TV Series) - Colucci
- 1996: The Juror - Court Clerk
- 1996: Thinner - Court Clerk
- 1997: Donnie Brasco - Wiseguy #2
- 2001: 100 Centre Street

== See also ==
- List of New York City Police Department officers
