= Benjamin Ward =

New York City Police Commissioner (1926–2002)

34th New York City Police Commissioner
- In office January 5, 1984 – October 22, 1989
- Appointed by: Ed Koch
- Preceded by: William J. Devine
- Succeeded by: Richard J. Condon

Personal details
- Born: August 10, 1926 Brooklyn, New York, U.S.
- Died: June 10, 2002 (aged 75) Queens, New York, U.S.
- Education: Brooklyn College; Brooklyn Law School

Benjamin Ward (August 10, 1926 – June 10, 2002) was the first African American New York City Police Commissioner.

== Early life ==
Ward was one of 11 children and was born in the Weeksville section of Brooklyn, New York. He attended Brooklyn Automotive Trades High School, graduating in 1944. Drafted into the Army after high school, he served as a military policeman and a criminal investigator with the Army in Europe for two years.

== Career in the NYPD ==
Ward entered the NYPD on June 1, 1951, as a patrolman, where he faced resentment from both white residents and white fellow cops. He wasn't assigned a locker at the precinct, forcing him to dress at home and ride the New York City Subway to work in his uniform for three years.

During the next 15 years in uniform, he rose through the ranks to lieutenant, serving in the Patrol Division, Juvenile Aide Division, Detective Division, and Legal Bureau. His rise was aided, in part, by his after-work studies at Brooklyn College and Brooklyn Law School (class of '65) that earned him undergraduate and law degrees—invariably with top honors.

He eventually served as special legal counsel to Police Commissioner Howard R. Leary. Ward left the uniformed ranks to become executive director of the New York City Civilian Complaint Review Board in 1966.

Two years later he was named a Deputy Police Commissioner of Trials, serving as chief hearing officer in all departmental disciplinary matters.

Later he became Deputy Commissioner of Community Affairs with responsibilities for the Youth Aid Division and the Auxiliary Forces Section.

Mayor John V. Lindsay designated Ward as Traffic Commissioner in 1973. Under his leadership, uniformed traffic controllers from his agency took on street duties, thereby freeing hundreds of police officers from traffic direction posts. The following year he headed up what is now known as the Criminal Justice Agency that performs bail risk evaluations.

Three years later, Mayor Edward I. Koch named him to the first of three posts in his administration: Chief of the New York City Housing Authority.

On August 13, 1979, he was designated to run the New York City Department of Corrections. He served as commissioner until December 31, 1983, when he accepted an appointment by Koch as New York City Police Commissioner.

Ward was sworn in by Mayor Koch as the city's thirty-fourth Police Commissioner on January 5, 1984. He was the first African American to hold that position. Ward oversaw the nation's largest police department during increased drug use, ex. crack and a sharp increase in related crime, including drug related murders. Ward's ownership also coincided with a period of culminating in the Tompkins Square Park Riot.

=== Criticism of response to Philip Cardillo's murder ===
See 1972 Harlem Mosque incident

On April 14, 1972, Patrolman Philip Cardillo and Vito Navarra responded to a "10–13" call at 102 E. 116th St. in Harlem, which was a Nation of Islam mosque where Malcolm X used to preach. Upon arriving inside, they rushed upstairs, violating an agreement the department had with Nation of Islam that officers had to be escorted through their mosque. Most of the police were forced out of the mosque and locked out, leaving Cardillo and officers Victor Padilla and Ivan Negron locked inside. Police eventually managed to break down the door and witnessed a man named Louis 17X Dupree standing over Cardillo with a gun in hand. Before Dupree could be taken into custody, however, Louis Farrakhan and Charles B. Rangel arrived at the scene, threatening a riot if Dupree was not released. Just as the police forensics unit was about to seal off the crime scene, they were ordered out of the mosque by the police brass. Outside a mob had overrun the street and overturned a police cruiser. Ward released the 16 suspects, an action for which he was later criticized by a grand jury. He also apologized to the minister, Louis Farrakhan, for violating an agreement that the police would not enter the mosque.

== Life after retirement ==
Ward retired as NYC Police Commissioner on October 22, 1989. After his retirement, he remained active, teaching and serving on various boards until failing health forced him to curtail such endeavors.

He served as an adjunct professor of law at Brooklyn Law School, an adjunct professor of corrections at the John Jay College of Criminal Justice, and an adjunct professor of the Hudson Valley Community College in Troy.

Ward's personal papers are housed in the Lloyd Sealy Library Special Collections at John Jay College of Criminal Justice.

== Death ==
Benjamin Ward died on June 10, 2002, at the age of 75.

== See also ==
- Tompkins Square Park Police Riot

Civic offices
Preceded by ?	Commissioner, New York City Department of Transportation; 1973–1975	Succeeded by ?
Preceded by ?	Commissioner, New York State Department of Correctional Services; 1975–1978	Succeeded by ?
Police appointments
Preceded by ?	Commissioner, New York City Housing Authority Police Department; 1978–1979	Succeeded by ?
Preceded by William Ciuros	Commissioner, New York City Department of Correction; 1979–1984	Succeeded by Peter Seitchik
Preceded by Robert J. McGuire	NYPD Commissioner; 1984–1989	Succeeded by Richard J. Condon
