= Donald Cawley =

- Born: Donald Francis Cawley; September 14, 1929; Woodside, Queens, New York, U.S.
- Died: September 21, 1990 (aged 61); Massapequa, New York, U.S.
- Police career
- Department: New York Police Department
- Service years: 1951–1973
- Rank: Commissioner

Donald Francis Cawley (September 14, 1929 – September 21, 1990) was an American law enforcement officer who served as New York City Police Commissioner from May to December 1973.

== Early life ==
Cawley was born on September 14, 1929, in Woodside, Queens. He studied engineering at Polytechnic Institute in Brooklyn but dropped out due to a lack of money.

== Career ==
=== Early career ===
In 1951 he joined the New York City Police Department. He was promoted to sergeant in 1959. In 1961 he began working in the First Deputy Commissioner's office, where he specialized in investigating corruption. He remained in the First Deputy Commissioner's office where he climbed to the rank of deputy inspector. In 1971 he was appointed as an inspector in charge of the Sixth Division, which consisted of most of Harlem. In 1972, commissioner Patrick V. Murphy passed over 72 more senior officers to name Cawley chief of patrol.

=== Commissioner ===
On April 12, 1973, it was announced that Cawley would succeed Murphy as police commissioner. At 43 years old he was the youngest commissioner in the department's history. He was sworn in on May 14, 1973.

As commissioner, Cawley overhauled the department's hiring practices by recruiting minorities, eliminating height requirements for officers, removing culturally biased questions from the Civil Service examination, and raising the age limit for new officers from 29 to 35. Cawley also enacted a policy that would see veteran officers found guilty of accepting minority gratuities punished with a fine instead of automatic dismissal and loss of pension. In an effort to combat street crime he assigned 1,000 detectives to patrol duty. After the shooting of Clifford Glover, Cawley created a special panel to screen out officers with a history of violent tendencies so they could face disciplinary action, receive additional training, or be reassigned to less stressful positions. He also instituted a name tag policy despite fierce opposition from the Police Benevolent Association of the City of New York. Cawley was not retained by Mayor Abraham Beame and left office on December 31, 1973.

== Later life ==
In April 1974, Cawley was named Chemical Bank's vice president in charge of security, purchasing, and communication services. In 1982 he became the vice president for administration of the New York Clearing House Association.

Cawley died of cancer on September 21, 1990, at his home Massapequa, New York. He was 61 years old.

Police appointments
Preceded by Patrick V. Murphy	New York City Police Commissioner; 1973	Succeeded by Michael Codd
