= Richard J. Condon =

Police commissioner

New York City Police Commissioner
- In office October 23, 1989 – January 22, 1990
- Preceded by: Benjamin Ward
- Succeeded by: Lee P. Brown

Personal details
- Born: 1935 (age 89–90) or 1936 (age 88–89)
- Occupation: Police officer, investigator
- Known for: Head of NYC School Investigations (post-retirement role)

Richard J. Condon (born 1935/1936) was the New York City Police Commissioner from October 23, 1989 to January 22, 1990.

Condon later served as New York City's Head of School Investigations, before retiring in late 2017.

Police appointments
Preceded by Benjamin Ward	Police Commissioner of New York City; 1989–1990	Succeeded by Lee P. Brown
