= Kenneth M. Karas =

American judge (born 1964)

Judge of the United States Foreign Intelligence Surveillance Court
- Incumbent
- Assumed office May 23, 2022
- Appointed by: John Roberts
- Preceded by: James Parker Jones

Judge of the United States District Court for the Southern District of New York
- Incumbent
- Assumed office June 13, 2004
- Appointed by: George W. Bush
- Preceded by: Allen G. Schwartz

Personal details
- Born: Kenneth Michael Karas; 1964 (age 61–62) Colorado Springs, Colorado, U.S.
- Spouse: Frances Elizabeth Bivens
- Children: 2
- Parent(s): John Karas; Alyce Babb
- Education: Georgetown University (BA); Columbia University (JD)

Kenneth Michael Karas (born 1964) is a United States district judge of the United States District Court for the Southern District of New York.

== Education and career ==
Karas was born in Colorado Springs, Colorado. He received a Bachelor of Arts degree from Georgetown University in 1986 magna cum laude and Phi Beta Kappa and a Juris Doctor from Columbia Law School in 1991, one of the Harlan Fiske Stone Scholars. Karas was a law clerk for Judge Reena Raggi of the United States District Court for the Eastern District of New York in 1992. He was an assistant United States attorney of the Southern District of New York from 1992 to 2004.

=== Federal judicial service ===
On September 18, 2003, Karas was nominated by President George W. Bush to a seat on the United States District Court for the Southern District of New York vacated by Judge Allen G. Schwartz. Karas was confirmed by the United States Senate on June 3, 2004, and received his commission on June 13, 2004.

== Notable cases ==
- On January 11, 2008, Karas sentenced Olympic gold medalist Marion Jones to six months in prison for making false statements after it was discovered that she had lied to federal investigators on two separate occasions: when she and Tim Montgomery were being investigated over the BALCO scandal and about her knowledge of fellow Olympian Montgomery's involvement in fraud. On May 16 that year he sentenced Montgomery, who was also Jones' ex-boyfriend, to 46 months in prison for his part in a multimillion-dollar fake-check scheme.
- In February and March 2015 Karas presided over Malcolm Smith's and Dan Halloran's trials for corruption. Smith was convicted on bribery and extortion charges while Halloran was found guilty of various corruption charges, including taking bribes to aid Smith's 2013 campaign for Mayor of New York City. He turned down the defense's appeal for leniency and sentenced Halloran to ten years in prison. The high-profile trials of Smith and Halloran were part of string of cases brought forward by federal investigators in an effort to curb political corruption within the New York state government.
- In May 2019, Karas presided over and sentenced Anthony Marraccini, a distinguished community member, civil servant, and the former chief of the Harrison Police Department to eighteen months in prison for tax evasion for which Marraccini had pled guilty.

== Personal life ==
He is married to Frances Bivens.

Legal offices
Preceded by Allen G. Schwartz	Judge of the United States District Court for the Southern District of New York; 2004–present	Incumbent
Preceded by James Parker Jones	Judge of the United States Foreign Intelligence Surveillance Court; 2022–present	Incumbent
