= William Hart (police chief) =

American police chief (1924–2003)

William L. Hart (January 17, 1924 – November 22, 2003) was a Detroit Police Chief for almost 15 years, a position for which he was hired by Coleman Young, the mayor of the Detroit, in 1976; Hart was a political ally and adviser of Young's. Hart served as a Detroit policeman for four decades, and was Detroit's first black police chief and the city's longest serving police chief until that time. He was honored by the AARP in 1988 and in 1992 sentenced to 10 years' prison and ordered to pay back $2.3 million he had stolen.

== Personal life ==
Hart was a World War II military veteran. Before moving to Detroit to find work, Hart lived in Pennsylvania until 1949, where he worked at a coal mine until it closed. Hart obtained a bachelor's degree in criminal justice and a master's in social education from Wayne State University. In 1973, he graduated from the FBI National Academy in Quantico, Virginia. In 1978, Hart was a guest lecturer at Michigan State University, in the College of Urban Development. Hart also secured a PhD in educational sociology from Wayne State. He married Laura around 1951, a nurse, who remained his wife until her death. Laura Hart died in 1992 at 62 years of age, while her husband was imprisoned; she had been his main witness during his defense in court. William Hart died at 79 years of age, in Philadelphia.

== Police career ==
Hart joined the Detroit police force in 1952; soon, working undercover on the 9th Precinct on Detroit's East Side in gambling and prostitution establishments, he became known as "the man of a thousand faces". Hart rose through the ranks; his specialties were the investigation of vice and of organized crime. His co-workers described him as "methodical" and "soft-spoken." In 1970, Detroit Police Commissioner Patrick V. Murphy promoted Hart to lieutenant. Years later Murphy said: «he enjoyed such an outstanding reputation in the department. He was highly respected by the people above him and below him in rank. His performance evaluation couldn`t have been better.» In the early 1970s, when the Internal Affairs Section was created (replacing the Citizen Complaint Bureau), Hart was one of only two officers selected to start it up.

In November 1984, U.S. President Ronald Reagan appointed Hart to head a nine-member commission to recommend what could the State and Federal governments do with regard to spouse, elderly and child abuse. In May 1988, the American Association of Retired Persons (AARP) honored Hart with a special commendation for "outstanding work with and for Detroit's older citizens", to serve as model "for other communities throughout the country."

Indicted in February 1991, following a two-year investigation, and together with a civilian Deputy Police Chief, Hart was convicted in May 1992 by a jury of 12 people of embezzling $2.3 million, starting in 1986. Prosecutors had accused Hart of stealing $2.6 million, but the judge determined some of the taken money had been legitimately spent.

Hart stole the money from the department's drug enforcement fund. He used part of the embezzled funds to benefit the mayor, including armoring his limousine, purchasing machine guns for the mayor's security detail, and paying for a satellite television system for the mayor's home. During court proceedings it was revealed that police crews were sent to protect the mayor's niece, who was accused in relation to the importation of drugs; eleven policemen who reported to him were accused of guarding drug shipments. Hart also used the embezzled funds to purchase what the press described as luxury cars and other gifts, including cash, trips and concert admissions for Hart's three girlfriends; to buy $1000-a-week worth of lottery tickets, and to pay for renovations to his residence and his Canadian cottage. Roughly one-half of the grafted money was laundered through front companies created by the Deputy Chief, who was separately convicted and sent to prison; one of these companies had allegedly paid $72,000 worth of rent on behalf of a Hart daughter in Beverly Hills. Hart was acquitted of witness tampering and of a charge of conspiracy with the convicted Deputy Chief.

=== Resignation ===
Hart resigned from his post as Police Chief the day after his May 1992 conviction; his salary was around $100,000. He remained eligible to collect his police pension. Hart was sentenced to the maximum penalty allowed by law, 10 year's prison, for graft, in August 1992; he was 68 years old at the time. Hart was ordered to pay back $2.34 million.

Hart served only seven years in jail, and was released in 1999.

== Tax convictions ==
Hart was convicted for submitting false tax returns in 1986 and 1987. He was acquitted of tax evasion in 1985. He was sentenced to three years for each of two counts of tax evasion, but these times were to run concurrently with his embezzlement conviction.

== Assessment ==
Following Hart's 1992 conviction, Detroit mayor Coleman A. Young said: «Bill Hart was a good man and a good cop".»
