= James S. Bolan =

1933 New York City Police Commissioner

James S. Bolan (June 2, 1871 or June 27, 1871 – May 26, 1952) was the New York City Police Commissioner in 1933.

== Biography ==
He was born in 1871 in Massachusetts and he had two sisters: Bridgett Bolan and Johanna Bolan. He was the New York City Police Commissioner in 1933. After he retired he founded the James S. Bolan Detective Agency. He died on May 26, 1952.

Bolan's papers are housed at the Lloyd Sealy Library Special Collections at John Jay College of Criminal Justice. The Commissioner James Bolan collection includes typescripts of radio addresses and speeches by Bolan and others, as well as reports describing the work of police bureaus dating to the early 1930s.

== Literature ==
- Whalen, Bernard; Whalen, Jon (2015). The NYPD's First 50 Years: Politicians, Police Commissioners, and Patrolmen. Potomac Books, Inc. pp. 160–188. ISBN 9781612346564.

Police appointments
Preceded by Edward P. Mulrooney	NYPD Commissioner; 1933–1934	Succeeded by John F. O'Ryan
