= William Francis Deegan =

American architect, soldier, and politician

- Born: December 28, 1882
- Died: April 3, 1932 (aged 49)

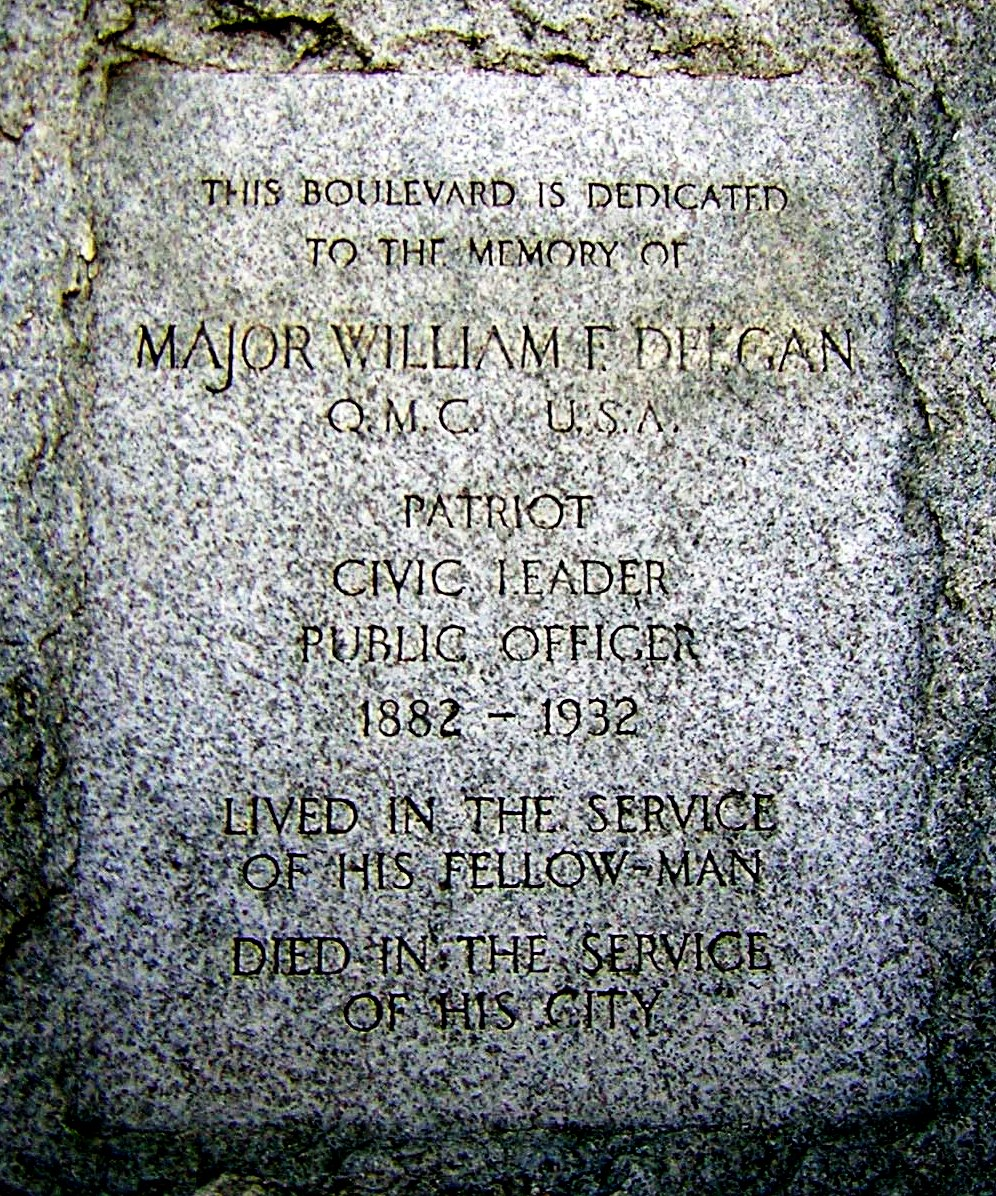
Deegan Rock is located at the junction of East 138th Street, the Major William F. Deegan Expressway, and the Grand Concourse.

William Francis Deegan (December 28, 1882 – April 3, 1932) was an architect, organizer of the American Legion, major in the Army Corps of Engineers, and Democratic political leader in New York City.

== Biography ==
He was born on December 28, 1882, to Irish immigrants. He studied architecture at Cooper Union and at age 35 served in World War I as a staff officer in the 105th Field Artillery.

Deegan later joined the United States Army Corps of Engineers as a major, where he supervised the construction of military bases in the New York area under the command of General George W. Goethals. After the war he helped organize the American Legion in 1919, advancing to State Commander in 1921. In 1922 he was considered a strong candidate to become national commander of the Legion at their convention in New Orleans, but was defeated due to his strong advocacy for admitting black veterans into the organization. Advocacy for the rights of black people was a strong theme throughout Deegan's career, including during his position as Tenement House Commissioner.

Deegan worked as an architect at a number of distinguished firms, including McKim, Mead & White; Post, Magnicke and Franke; and Starrett and van Vleck. Later in life he held a number of political positions, most of them in the Bronx. Deegan was President of the Bronx Chamber of Commerce until the chamber grew critical of Mayor Jimmy Walker, at which point he resigned. In 1928, Mayor Walker appointed him Tenement House Commissioner of New York City—a post he held for the rest of his life—and in 1930, chairman of the Mayor's Committee on Receptions to Distinguished Guests, or "official greeter", a job in which he was preceded by his friend Rodman Wanamaker and eventually succeeded by Grover Whalen.

Major Deegan died of complications following surgery for an appendectomy on April 3, 1932.

== Legacy ==
At the time of his death, a new road was being built from the Triborough Bridge to the Grand Concourse. This was renamed and expanded in 1956 into the Major Deegan Expressway section of I-87 in the Bronx, which retains his name.
