= 1972 Harlem mosque incident =

1972 shooting in New York City

Coordinates: 40.802014°N 73.950227°W

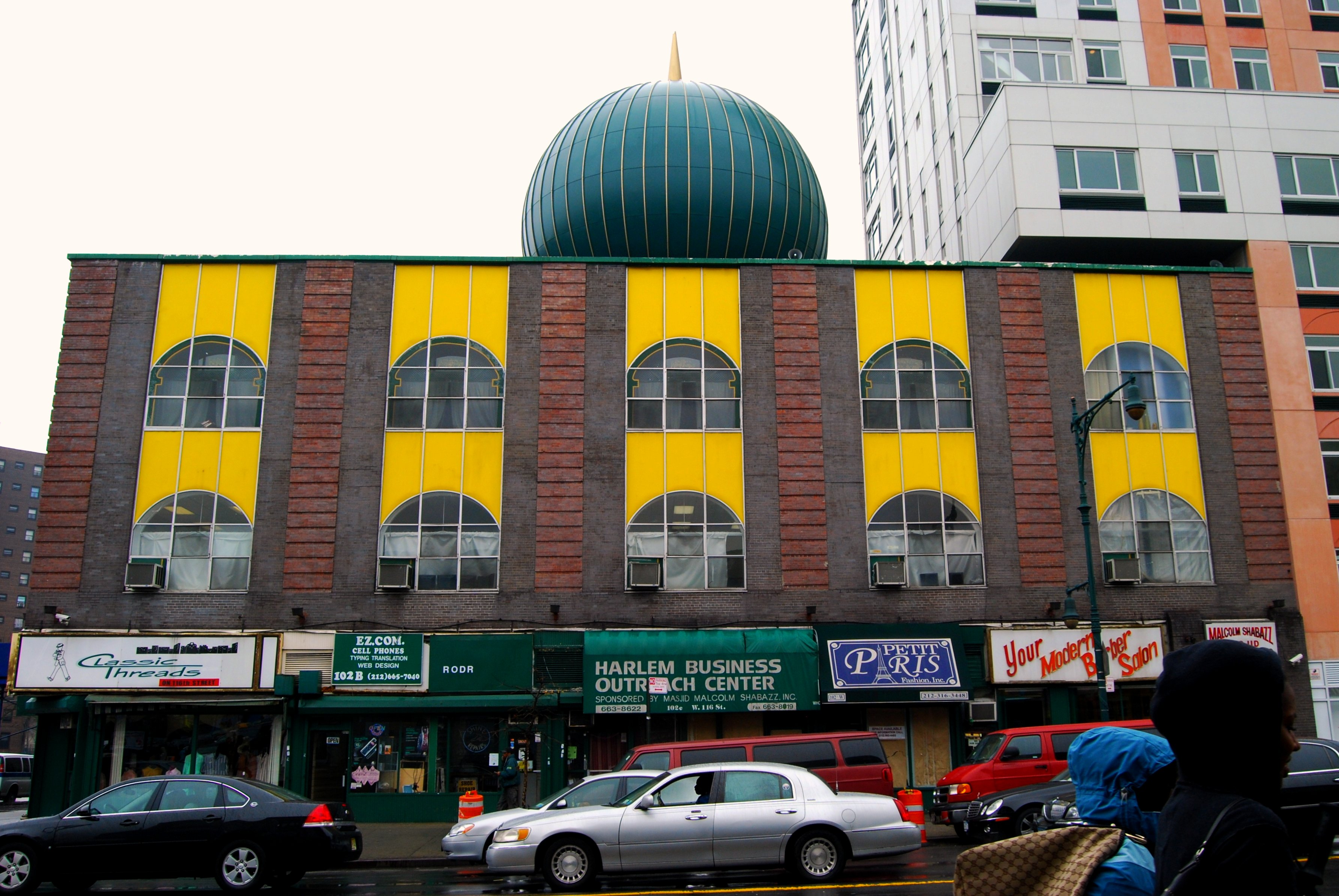
Mosque No. 7 today, known as Malcolm Shabazz Mosque.

The 1972 Harlem mosque attack occurred on April 14, 1972, when a New York City Police Department (NYPD) officer was shot and fatally wounded at the Nation of Islam Mosque No. 7 in Harlem, Manhattan, New York City, United States. The officer responded to a fake emergency call, but was shot and died from his wounds six days later. The incident sparked political and public outcry about mishandling of the incident by the NYPD and the administration of Mayor John V. Lindsay.

== The incident ==
On April 14, 1972, a 10–13, or officer's call for assistance, from a man claiming to be a Detective Thomas was received by police. The call came from 102 West 116th Street, the Nation of Islam Mosque No. 7, where Malcolm X was once minister before his conversion to Sunni Islam. Officers Phillip Cardillo and Vito Navarra of the New York City Police Department's 28th Precinct responded, entering the mosque.

When they arrived, they heard scuffling on the floor above. As they made their way to a staircase they were intercepted by fifteen to twenty men who forced the officers to retreat down the stairs and back into the hallway. Officers Victor Padilla and Ivan Negron, of the 25th Precinct, arrived and entered the premises. The four officers were outnumbered and were then attacked. Navarra was able to escape as a steel door was closed, trapping Cardillo, Padilla and Negron.

According to the NYPD, the officers were attacked by around fifteen to twenty congregants, were beaten, and stripped of their guns. Padilla was then beaten and blackjacked into semi-consciousness while his partner fought off several men who were trying to grab his revolver. With his back to the door, Negron suddenly heard shots. He turned and saw a man with a gun in his hand who seemed to be getting up from the floor where Cardillo now lay shot.

Cardillo had been assaulted, stripped of his firearm and was shot at point-blank range. Negron, managing to free himself from his attackers, drew his revolver and fired three shots. It is not known if the man with the gun was hit; he escaped. Officer Rudy Andre of the 28th Precinct broke the glass on the front metal door and saw the patrolmen inside on their backs. He fired several shots through the broken glass into the hallway which scattered the men who had been assaulting the officers, thus enabling Negron to unbolt the double metal door. During the melee, Cardillo and Padilla were seriously injured.

Mosque representatives maintained that the officers entered with guns drawn and interrupted prayer despite repeated requests to leave their guns outside. During the initial attempt to enter the mosque, police officers, including Navarra, claimed that prior to being forced out, they witnessed a man named Louis 17X Dupree standing over the dying Cardillo with a gun in hand. After reinforcements arrived, allowing police to retake the mosque, Dupree and several others were initially arrested at the scene. However, before Dupree could be taken into custody, Louis Farrakhan and Congressman Charles Rangel arrived at the scene, threatening a riot if Dupree was not released.

The NYPD's chief of detectives, Albert Seedman, was the ranking officer at the scene. He said years afterwards that he called Chief Inspector Michael Codd from the basement and asked for two busloads of police cadets, to be armed only with nightsticks, to keep the peace outside. Codd, Seedman said, refused, hung up the phone, and would not take Seedman's subsequent calls.

Soon after, more officers arrived on the scene. An angry mob began to form around the police barricade, and began pelting officers with projectiles and calling them "pigs." Several high ranking police officials ordered all officers out of the mosque and sent away all white officers. It was hours later before 300–500 people were able to peacefully exit from the mosque after negotiations. Due to the lower police force and a still angry crowd, police abandoned the scene.

A promise was made by Rangel and Farrakhan, according to Seedman, that Dupree and the other suspects would turn themselves in to the 24th police precinct the following day, though none ever did. Rangel denies making such a promise. A new police policy was summarily enacted, identifying the mosque as a "sensitive location," thus preventing an investigation into the shooting for two years. Officer Cardillo died six days later at St. Luke's Hospital as a result of his wounds. In a decided break with tradition, neither mayor John V. Lindsay nor the police commissioner at the time, Patrick V. Murphy, attended officer Cardillo's funeral.

The "Detective Thomas" from the original false alarm 10-13 call was never identified. Many of the officers of the NYPD, including Detective Randy Jurgensen, who was the Cardillo case's lead detective, believed the fake call to be either a diversion or a trap, possibly set by elements of the Black Liberation Army, which the NYPD blamed for numerous murders of police officers. Others have suggested that the fake call was a pretext call from an FBI informant, intended to spark dissent under the COINTELPRO program.

According to Cardillo's family, police investigators failed to follow procedure in investigating the shooting. Due to political pressure, officers in the basement directed by Chief Seedman released a dozen suspects in the shooting without identifying them. The release of the suspects severely hampered the investigation. Farrakhan later stated that the officers "charged into our temple like criminals and were treated like criminals."

== Trial ==
Two years after the shooting, prosecutors brought charges against the mosque school's dean, Louis 17X Dupree, after an informant who witnessed the incident testified against him. Subsequent to the first trial culminating in a hung jury, Dupree was acquitted at the second, largely because ballistic evidence could not be recovered and Dupree's attorneys made the argument that either Cardillo shot himself or that he was shot by another police officer.

== Aftermath ==
In 2012, local police officers proposed to the Manhattan Community Board 10 that part of the street in front of the mosque be renamed after Officer Cardillo.

Albert Seedman said he decided to retire that day, as he was walking back to his car and dodging bricks being thrown at him. He claimed at the time that his retirement had nothing to do with the incident. In 2012, however, a year before his death, he admitted that his disgust with Codd's refusal to provide the extra officers was his real reason, and he did not want to say so at the time because "I loved the police department so much that I couldn't drag it through the dirt by saying what those bastards did."

== See also ==
- List of unsolved murders (1900–1979)
