= Edward P. Mulrooney =

Edward Pierce Mulrooney (July 24, 1874 – April 29, 1960) was the New York City Police Commissioner from 1930 to 1933. He then went on to become chairman of the State Alcoholic Beverage Control Board.

== Biography ==
He was born on July 24, 1874, in New Jersey. He was the New York City Police Commissioner from 1930 to 1933. He then went on to become the first chairman of the State Alcoholic Beverage Control Board in 1933. He died on April 30, 1960.

== Literature ==
- Whalen, Bernard; Whalen, Jon (2015). The NYPD's First 50 Years: Politicians, Police Commissioners, and Patrolmen. Potomac Books, Inc. pp. 161–171. ISBN 9781612346564.

Police appointments
Preceded by Grover Whalen	NYPD Commissioner; 1930–1933	Succeeded by James S. Bolan
