= Mayor's Committee on Receptions to Distinguished Guests =

The New York City Mayor's Committee on Receptions to Distinguished Guests was established on September 6, 1919, to "provide adequate welcome and reception to foreign dignitaries, accredited representatives of European governments and other distinguished guests who may visit New York."

== Chairman ==
- Rodman Wanamaker
- William Francis Deegan
- Grover Aloysius Whalen ? to 1926
