= Allen G. Schwartz =

American judge

Judge of the United States District Court for the Southern District of New York
- In office November 22, 1993 – March 22, 2003
- Appointed by: Bill Clinton
- Preceded by: Vincent L. Broderick
- Succeeded by: Kenneth M. Karas

Personal details
- Born: Allen G. Schwartz; August 23, 1934 Brooklyn, New York, U.S.
- Died: March 22, 2003 (aged 68) Westchester County, New York, U.S.
- Spouse: Joan Teitel (married 1965)
- Education: City College of New York (B.B.A.); University of Pennsylvania Law School (LL.B.)

Allen George Schwartz (August 23, 1934 – March 22, 2003) was a United States district judge of the United States District Court for the Southern District of New York.

== Education and career ==
Born in Brooklyn, New York, Schwartz received a Bachelor of Business Administration degree from City College of New York, Baruch College in 1955 and a Bachelor of Laws from the University of Pennsylvania Law School in 1958. He was in the United States Army from 1958 to 1959, remaining in the United States Army Reserves until 1965. He was an Assistant district attorney of New York County from 1959 to 1962. He was in private practice in New York City from 1962 to 1977, and a corporation counsel for New York City from 1978 to 1981, returning to private practice from 1982 to 1993.

Schwartz was defense counsel for Howard and Ella Solomon, owners of Cafe Au Go Go in Greenwich Village, who were tried alongside comedian Lenny Bruce on obscenity charges in 1964.

He formed a law partnership with Edward I. Koch in 1965. Appointed Corporation Counsel when Koch became New York City mayor in 1978, Schwartz was credited with revamping the corporation counsel office, which was in disarray as a result of the city's fiscal crisis. Beyond his professional relationships, Schwartz was a close friend and adviser to Koch. Schwartz later said, "Ed Koch and I never had an argument and we never had an uncomfortable day with each other."

Schwartz presided over a legal dispute between authors J. K. Rowling and N. K. Stouffer. Stouffer alleged that Rowling had stolen material from her 1984 works The Legend of Rah and the Muggles and Larry Potter and His Best Friend Lilly. In 2002 Schwartz ruled that Stouffer had lied to the court and doctored evidence to support her claims, fining Stouffer $50,000 for a "pattern of intentional bad faith conduct."

== Federal judicial service ==
On October 27, 1993, Schwartz was nominated by President Bill Clinton to a seat on the United States District Court for the Southern District of New York vacated by Vincent Lyons Broderick. Schwartz was confirmed by the United States Senate on November 20, 1993, and received his commission on November 22, 1993, serving until his death at age 68.

== See also ==
- List of Jewish American jurists

== Sources ==
Legal offices
Preceded by Vincent L. Broderick	Judge of the United States District Court for the Southern District of New York; 1993–2003	Succeeded by Kenneth M. Karas
