= Michael Codd =

American police commissioner (1916–1985)

- Born: Michael Joseph Codd; April 16, 1916; West New Brighton, Staten Island, New York, U.S.
- Died: August 29, 1985 (aged 69); Elmhurst, Queens, New York, U.S.
- Police career
- Department: New York Police Department
- Service years: 1941–1973, 1974–1977
- Rank: Commissioner

Michael Joseph Codd (April 16, 1916 – August 29, 1985) was an American law enforcement officer who served as New York City Police Commissioner from 1974 to 1977.

== Early life ==
Codd was born on April 16, 1916, in West New Brighton, Staten Island. He was one of ten children born to Mark and Elizabeth (McLoughlin) Codd, both Irish immigrants. After graduating from St. Peter's Boys High School, Codd worked in a grocery store and eventually became store manager.

== Career ==
=== Early career ===
Codd began his law enforcement career with the New York State Police in 1939. In 1941 he joined the New York City Police Department as a probationary officer in the 20th Precinct. Less than a year later he was drafted into the United States Army and served in the military police during World War II, rising to the rank of provost marshal for Western India.

Codd rejoined the NYPD after the war. He was promoted to sergeant in 1949, lieutenant in 1952, and captain in 1959. In 1961 he was named deputy inspector and placed in command of the Brooklyn North Area consisting of the Bedford–Stuyvesant and Brownsville neighborhood.

=== Chief inspector ===
In 1970 he was promoted to chief inspector by Commissioner Patrick V. Murphy, who passed over four more senior officers to make Codd the top uniformed officer in the department. Codd was chief inspector during the 1972 Harlem mosque incident and the 1973 Brooklyn hostage crisis. He retired from the department on April 16, 1973.

=== Commissioner ===
Codd's retirement was short lived as on December 12, 1973, mayor-elect Abraham Beame announced Codd as his choice for police commissioner. Codd planned to have civilians take over more of the non-law enforcement duties in department and soon after taking office announced he would move 1,000 officers from clerical assignments to street patrol. In November 1974 he fired 19 police officers for accepting a total of $240,000 in payoffs from gamblers. In 1976 he gave Vittoria Renzullo command of the First Precinct in Lower Manhattan, making her the first woman to head a police precinct in New York City.

On June 30, 1975, the NYPD was forced to lay off 5,000 employees due to the city's financial crisis. The following year the department and the Police Benevolent Association of the City of New York became locked in bitter negotiations over pay raises and work schedules that saw demonstrations thousands of off-duty officers at police stations and Codd's home. 20 officers were accused of misconduct during the protests and the head of the PBA was fined $7,500 and placed on one-year probation for refusing an assignment and picketing while on duty. The PBA requested amnesty for the officers as part of contract negotiations, but Codd refused.

Codd led the department during the New York City blackout of 1977, which saw over 2,000 looting incidents and an estimated $1 billion in losses. The department was criticized for not stopping the looting, however Codd and Mayor Beame contended that there were not enough officers available to stop the looting. The department made a total of 3,777 arrests and 418 officers were injured (18 seriously injured) during the 25-hour blackout.

Codd also led the department during the shooting spree of the Son of Sam, who killed six and wounded seven people between July 29 and July 31, 1977. 300 officers were assigned to the Son of Sam case and Codd rehired 136 officers that had been laid off to assist in the hunt. Following the arrest of David Berkowitz, Codd promoted 25 officers for their work in the case and awarded 193 members of the department certificates of merit.

On September 11, 1977, Codd was admitted to St John's Queens Hospital for exhaustion. He was released on September 17 and returned to work on September 26. Codd announced his resignation on December 1, 1977, to allow incoming mayor Ed Koch to appoint his own commissioner. Upon leaving office, Codd applied for a disability pension under a provision in the "heart bill", which granted benefits to public safety officers who developed heart aliments. The Police Pension Board turned down his request based on the New York City Corporation Counsel's ruling that Codd's years as commissioner didn't count towards his pension. In 1981, the board approved Codd and 113 other "heart bill" pensions after a ruling by the New York Court of Appeals. Codd died on August 29, 1985, at his home in Elmhurst, Queens. He was 69 years old.

Police appointments
Preceded by Donald Cawley	New York City Police Commissioner; 1974–1977	Succeeded by Robert J. McGuire
