= Robert J. McGuire =

American attorney (born 1936)

32nd New York City Police Commissioner
- In office January 1, 1978 – December 30, 1983
- Preceded by: Michael Codd
- Succeeded by: William J. Devine

Personal details
- Born: Robert Joseph McGuire; December 8, 1936 (age 88); New York City, U.S.
- Spouse: Joan Wroldsen (m. 1972)
- Children: 2
- Education: Iona College; St. John's University
- Occupation: Attorney, business executive

Robert Joseph McGuire (born December 8, 1936) is an American attorney and business executive who served as New York City Police Commissioner from 1978 to 1983.

== Early life ==
McGuire was born on December 8, 1936, in The Bronx and grew up in Throggs Neck. His father, James McGuire, was a New York City Police Department officer who served as the deputy chief of the Emergency Service Unit. McGuire attended Iona College on a basketball scholarship and earned his law degree from St. John's University School of Law.

== Legal career ==
From 1962 to 1966, McGuire was an assistant United States Attorney for the Southern District of New York. He left the US attorney’s office to serve as a legal advisor to the commander of the Somali Police Force. Upon his return to the US he joined the firm of Phillips, Nizer, Benjamin, Rosen, & Ballon and started a program in Harlem that provided legal representation for the poor. McGuire’s program eventually merged with The Legal Aid Society. In 1969 he started a firm with former prosecutor Andrew M. Lawler.

== Police commissioner ==
On December 15, 1977, mayor-elect Ed Koch announced that McGuire would serve as New York City Police Commissioner in his administration. At the age of 41, he was the youngest NYPD commissioner since Theodore Roosevelt. At the time McGuire took over the department, it was suffering from low morale caused by to layoffs during New York City’s fiscal crisis. As the city’s financial condition improved, the department was able to rehire officers and grant raises as well as adding younger officers and members of minority groups to its force. Under McGuire, the department increased foot patrols and cracked down on career criminals, which led to a modest reduction in crime. In 1979, Koch gave him authority over the New York City Transit Police and the New York City Housing Authority Police Department. McGuire left office on December 30, 1983. His six year stint as New York City’s Police Commissioner was the longest since Lewis Joseph Valentine's decade in office ended in 1945.

== Business career ==
On January 1, 1984, McGuire joined Pinkerton as chairman and chief executive officer. As CEO, McGuire worked to build up Pinkerton's investigative division, gain more government contracts, and acquire other businesses. However, under McGuire's leadership the company lost $11 million in sales. In 1988, Pinkerton was sold by its parent company American Brands, and McGuire was given a lucrative severance package to leave the company.

In 1989, McGuire became a senior managing director of Kroll Inc. In 1990, Kroll was hired by Covenant House’s board of directors to investigate its founder and president Bruce Ritter. The investigation, led by McGuire, found that Ritter had engaged in sexual and financial misconduct and faulted the board for not exercising proper oversight. In 1991, McGuire was named Kroll’s president and chief operating officer. He remained with Kroll until it was purchased by Equifax in 1997.

== Other public sector work ==
In 1990, McGuire was appointed to a 4-year term on the New York City Conflicts of Interest Board by mayor David Dinkins. In 1992 he was chosen to serve as a special master charged with breaking up Thomas Gambino’s Garment District trucking business. In 2002 he was named chairman of Mayor Michael Bloomberg's charter revision commission.

== Personal life ==
In 1972, McGuire married Joan Wroldsen. They have two children one of whom, Brendan McGuire, is the chief legal counsel to New York City Mayor Eric Adams. The McGuires own a 40 acre farm in Connecticut. He is a member of the Roman Catholic Church.

Police appointments
Preceded by Michael Codd	New York City Police Commissioner; 1978–1983	Succeeded by Benjamin Ward
Business positions
Preceded by Eugene C. Fey	CEO of Pinkerton; 1984–1988	Succeeded by Thomas W. Wathen
Preceded by Jules Kroll	President of Kroll Inc. 1991–1997	Succeeded by Michael Cherkasky
