= Vincent L. Broderick =

American judge (1920–1995)

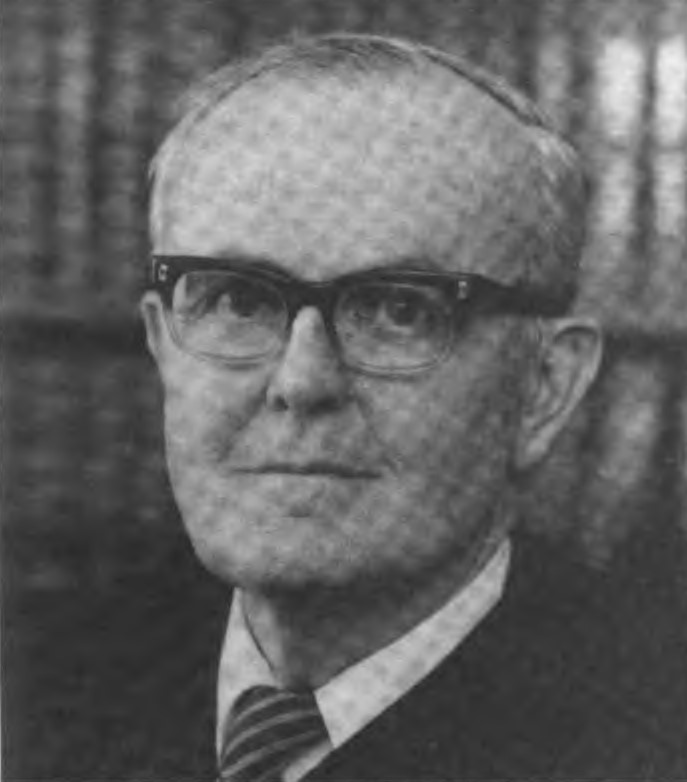

Senior Judge of the United States District Court for the Southern District of New York
- In office December 1, 1988 – March 3, 1995

Judge of the United States District Court for the Southern District of New York
- In office October 4, 1976 – December 1, 1988
- Appointed by: Gerald Ford
- Preceded by: Harold R. Tyler Jr.
- Succeeded by: Allen G. Schwartz

Police Commissioner of New York City
- In office June 7, 1965 – February 21, 1966
- Mayor: Robert F. Wagner Jr. John Lindsay
- Preceded by: Michael J. Murphy
- Succeeded by: Howard R. Leary

United States Attorney for the Southern District of New York Acting
- In office September 6, 1962 – November 20, 1962
- President: John F. Kennedy
- Preceded by: Robert Morgenthau
- Succeeded by: Robert Morgenthau

Personal details
- Born: Vincent Lyons Broderick; April 26, 1920 New York City, New York, U.S.
- Died: March 3, 1995 (aged 74) Needham, Massachusetts, U.S.
- Education: Princeton University (AB); Harvard University (LLB)

Vincent Lyons Broderick (April 26, 1920 – March 3, 1995) was a United States district judge of the United States District Court for the Southern District of New York.

== Education and career ==
Born on April 26, 1920, in New York City, New York, Broderick received an Artium Baccalaureus degree in 1941 from Princeton University. He received a Bachelor of Laws in 1948 from Harvard Law School. He was a Captain in the United States Army Corps of Engineers from 1942 to 1946. He was in private practice in law in New York City from 1948 to 1954, 1965 to 1966 and 1971 to 1976. He was deputy commissioner for legal matters for the New York City Police Department from 1954 to 1956. He was general counsel for the National Association of Investment Companies from 1956 to 1961. He was the Chief Assistant United States Attorney for the Southern District of New York from 1961 to 1962 and 1962 to 1965. He was the United States Attorney for the Southern District of New York in 1962. He was the Police Commissioner of New York City from 1965 to 1966.

=== Controversy ===
Broderick previously lived in Pelham, New York, but moved to an area of the Bronx between Pelham and Pelham Bay Park after he became the New York City Police Commissioner. His wife, Sally Broderick, stated after his death that the family had received criticism after they moved since people erroneously accused them of not really living in New York City.

== Federal judicial service ==
Broderick was nominated by President Gerald Ford on August 26, 1976, to a seat on the United States District Court for the Southern District of New York vacated by Judge Harold R. Tyler Jr. He was confirmed by the United States Senate on September 23, 1976, and received his commission on October 4, 1976. He assumed senior status on December 1, 1988. His service terminated on March 3, 1995, due to his death of cancer in Needham, Massachusetts.

== Sources ==
Police appointments
Preceded by Michael J. Murphy	NYPD Commissioner; 1965–1966	Succeeded by Howard R. Leary
Legal offices
Preceded by Harold R. Tyler Jr.	Judge of the United States District Court for the Southern District of New York; 1976–1988	Succeeded by Allen G. Schwartz
