= Grover Whalen =

New York City politician (1886–1962)

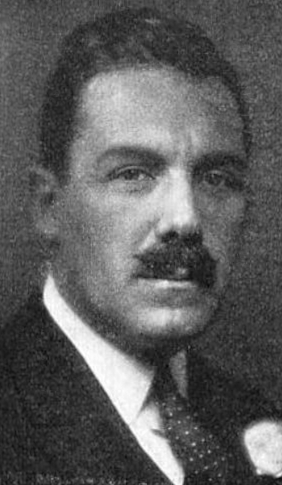
Whalen in 1929

Grover Aloysius Whalen (1886–1962) was a prominent politician, businessman, and public relations guru in New York City during the 1930s and 1940s.

== Early years ==
Whalen was born on July 2, 1886, in New York City, the son of an Irish immigrant father and a French-Canadian mother. They named their son after President Grover Cleveland, who was married on the same day that their child was born. His father, Michael Whalen, was a successful trucking contractor and a Tammany Hall supporter.

Grover Whalen attended DeWitt Clinton High School and afterwards studied law. He then joined the staff of John Wanamaker's department store, with which he would long be associated. He married Anna Dolores Kelly in 1913.

Whalen ran his father's ash and garbage disposal business for a time before becoming involved in politics, working for the election of John F. Hylan as Mayor of New York.

== Political appointments ==
After Hylan became Mayor in 1918, Whalen was appointed to be Commissioner of Plants and Structures. In this position he supervised the city's transportation system. He also served as Hylan's Commissioner of Purchase and took part in greeting ceremonies, including the welcome of General John J. Pershing, commander of the American Expeditionary Forces, in 1919. In 1922, he proposed the creation of a radio station owned and operated by the city, a plan that came to fruition with the first broadcast of WNYC in 1924.

In 1924, Whalen left the Hylan administration to assist Rodman Wanamaker in the operation of the Wanamaker department stores, serving as general manager. Wanamaker named him Vice President of Operations for the American Trans-Oceanic Company, a new airline flying Curtiss seaplanes between New York and Florida.

== Police Commissioner ==
In 1928, he returned to civic life when he was appointed by Mayor Jimmy Walker to the position of New York City Police Commissioner. He was known to be a ruthless enforcer of Prohibition laws. Whalen was famously quoted as saying, "There is plenty of law at the end of a nightstick."

Whalen came under fire for police handling of the International Unemployment Day demonstration on March 6, 1930, in New York City, in which an impromptu march of 35,000 or more demonstrators down Broadway to New York City Hall was set upon by 1,000 baton-wielding police.

The brutal scene was described by a reporter from the New York Times:

Hundreds of policemen and detectives, swinging nightsticks, blackjacks, and bare fists, rushed into the crowd, hitting out at all with whom they came into contact, chasing many across the street and into adjacent thoroughfares and pushing hundreds off their feet. From all parts of the scene of battle came the screams of women and cries of men with bloody heads and faces.

Sharply criticized for the escalation of violence by the police, Whalen was forced to resign his post within two months.

== Later career ==
He was later appointed by Fiorello La Guardia as Chairman of the Mayor's Committee on Receptions to Distinguished Guests, succeeding William Francis Deegan, and was recognized by his groomed moustache and carnation boutonniere. In this capacity, in which he served until the early 1950s, he officially welcomed everyone from Charles Lindbergh to Admiral Richard Evelyn Byrd to Douglas MacArthur to New York and became master of the ticker tape parade.

In 1933, Whelan received The Hundred Year Association of New York's Gold Medal Award "in recognition of outstanding contributions to the City of New York." In 1935, he became president of the New York World Fair Corporation and put a familiar face on the 1939 New York World's Fair. He was on the cover of Time magazine on May 1, 1939.

=== Mr. New York ===
Whalen was known as the official greeter and organizer of many public events and celebrations taking place in New York during the first half of the 20th century. G.P. Putnam's Sons, the publisher of Whalen's autobiography, came up with Mr. New York as the title of his autobiography.

In the acknowledgements before beginning his autobiography, Whalen gives credit to the late Melville Minton, President of G.P. Putnam's Sons, for encouraging him to write a book about New York. During an interview with the New Yorker in November 1955, Whalen claims that Minton asked him to write a book about New York during the 1920s. The publishing company provided Whalen with a staff of researchers responsible for validating stories and facts incorporated into the autobiography. Ted Purdy, the man in charge of editing Whalen's writing, took the 800 pages penned by Whalen and condensed it into a 300-page collection of personal accounts. Purdy and his team also provided the Mr. New York title for the collection of stories written by Whalen.

The bulk of his writing describes planning and execution of receptions, ceremonies, and civic projects under his direction. He provides vivid imagery and background information regarding specific events such as ticker-tape parades for American heroes like Lindbergh after the completion of his flight across the Atlantic Ocean from New York to Paris in 1927. Whalen also goes into great detail about the planning and intricacies behind the parades for returning World War II soldiers, most notably General Dwight D. Eisenhower in June 1945. Although Whalen claims that he wrote extensively about those accounts because he thought his readers would find them most interesting, he left out the fact of political corruption. Throughout his writings, he often refers to the advantages of political ambition under the wing of Tammany Hall. However, he never admits to any moral wrongdoing of the political machine. Also, after the stock market crashed in 1929, Frank Costello was recorded telling Lucky Luciano that he had to advance Whalen $30,000 to cover his margin calls on the market. A few seconds later he said, "What could I do? We own him." (This needs clarification. Whi is "he" -- Costello or Luciano?)

In the beginning and ending chapters of the autobiography, Whalen provides valuable insight on the many things he values and loves about his city. In the first few chapters, Whalen writes with a nostalgic pen recollecting memories of the family culture of the close-knit neighborhood he grew up in on the Lower East Side.

Also, in the last chapter he concludes by describing his fascination with New York, using the trajectory of his professional career as evidence of the proposed American dream: "New York means to me a place where anyone can still rise to the top, no matter how humble his beginnings."

=== Death and legacy ===
He died at the age of 75 on April 20, 1962.

He is mentioned in the Harold Arlen/Yip Harburg song Lydia the Tattooed Lady (Here is Grover Whalen, unveilin' the Trylon...), the Cole Porter song Let's Fly Away, and the Bobby Short song Sweet Bye and Bye as well as in the 1933 film The Prizefighter and the Lady, starring Myrna Loy and Max Baer. Grover Whalen is also mentioned in Once in a Lifetime, a play written by Moss Hart and George S. Kaufman in 1930. He is also mentioned in E.B. White's essay "The World of Tomorrow." In P.G. Wodehouse's 1940 novel Quick Service, the character J.B. Duff's false moustache is compared disparagingly to that of Grover Whalen. Johnny Mandel's 1955 jazz tune "Groover Wailin'" is a pun on Whalen's name. A character in Gregory Mcdonald's Flynn novels (published between 1976 and 1999) is Sgt. Richard Whalen, who is consistently addressed by the mischievous Flynn as "Grover". Whalen has no idea why Flynn does this, and finds it annoying.

== Footnotes ==
Police appointments
Preceded by Joseph A. Warren	NYPD Commissioner; 1928–1930	Succeeded by Edward P. Mulrooney
