= Harold R. Tyler Jr. =

American judge (1922–2005)

United States Attorney General Acting
- In office January 20, 1977
- President: Jimmy Carter
- Deputy: Vacant
- Preceded by: Edward H. Levi
- Succeeded by: Dick Thornburgh (acting)

15th United States Deputy Attorney General
- In office April 6, 1975 – January 20, 1977
- President: Gerald Ford
- Preceded by: Laurence Silberman
- Succeeded by: Peter F. Flaherty

Judge of United States District Court for the Southern District of New York
- In office August 2, 1962 – April 6, 1975
- Appointed by: John F. Kennedy
- Preceded by: Seat established by 75 Stat. 80
- Succeeded by: Vincent L. Broderick

2nd United States Assistant Attorney General for the Civil Rights Division
- In office 1960–1961
- President: Dwight D. Eisenhower
- Preceded by: W. Wilson White
- Succeeded by: Burke Marshall

Personal details
- Born: Harold Russell Tyler Jr. May 14, 1922 Utica, New York, U.S.
- Died: May 25, 2005 (aged 83) New York City, New York, U.S.
- Party: Republican
- Education: Princeton University (A.B.); Columbia Law School (LL.B.)

Harold Russell Tyler Jr. (May 14, 1922 – May 25, 2005) was a United States district judge of the United States District Court for the Southern District of New York.

== Education and career ==
Born in Utica, New York, Tyler received an Artium Baccalaureus degree from Princeton University in 1943, and served as a captain in the United States Army during World War II. He then received a Bachelor of Laws from Columbia Law School in 1949, entering private practice in New York City from 1949 to 1951. He was again a captain in the United States Army from 1951 to 1952. He was an Assistant United States Attorney of the Southern District of New York from 1953 to 1955, returning to private practice in New York City from 1955 to 1959. He was a United States Assistant Attorney General for civil rights from 1960 to 1961. He was in private practice in New York City in 1961.

== Federal judicial service ==
On May 17, 1962, Tyler was nominated by President John F. Kennedy to a new seat on the United States District Court for the Southern District of New York created by 75 Stat. 80. He was confirmed by the United States Senate on August 1, 1962, and received his commission on August 2, 1962. He was a board member of the Federal Judicial Center from 1968 to 1972. Tyler resigned from the federal bench on April 6, 1975.

Tyler was Attorney General Elliot Richardson's first choice to lead the Watergate Special Prosecution Force, but he declined.

== Post judicial service and death ==
Tyler served as a Deputy United States Attorney General from 1975 to 1977, thereafter returning to private practice in New York City until his death. He died on May 25, 2005, outside his apartment in Manhattan.

== Sources ==
Legal offices
Preceded by Seat established by 75 Stat. 80	Judge of United States District Court for the Southern District of New York; 1962–1975	Succeeded by Vincent L. Broderick
Preceded by Laurence Silberman	United States Deputy Attorney General; 1975–1977	Succeeded by Peter F. Flaherty
Preceded by Edward H. Levi	United States Attorney General; Acting; 1977	Succeeded by Dick Thornburgh; Acting
