= Howard R. Leary =

American police commissioner

- Born: August 7, 1911; Pittsburgh, Pennsylvania, U.S.
- Died: January 31, 1994 (aged 82); Buckingham Township, Bucks County, Pennsylvania, U.S.
- Police career
- Department: Philadelphia Police Department; New York Police Department
- Service years: 1940–1966 (Philadelphia); 1966–1970 (New York)
- Rank: Commissioner

Howard R. Leary (August 7, 1911 – January 31, 1994) was an American law enforcement officer who served as Commissioner of the Philadelphia Police Department from 1963 to 1966 and New York City Police Commissioner from 1966 to 1970.

== Early life ==
Leary was born on August 7, 1911, in Pittsburgh. He grew up in Philadelphia and attended private schools. He graduated from Temple University in 1939 with a degree in business administration and a law degree from Temple University School of Law in 1947.

== Career ==
=== Philadelphia ===
Leary began his career in 1940 with the Philadelphia Police Department. He worked his way through the ranks and was promoted to deputy chief for administration in April 1956. On July 24, 1963, commissioner Albert N. Brown resigned for health reasons and Leary was promoted to succeed him. At the time of his appointment, Jack Saunders of The Philadelphia Inquirer praised Leary for improving relations between the department and the Black community.

Leary took personal command of the department's response to the 1964 Philadelphia race riot, which had been caused by rising tensions between black residents of the city and police over several well-publicized allegations of police brutality. Although 341 people were injured and 225 stores were damaged or destroyed in the three days of rioting, there were no fatalities.

=== New York City ===
During the 1965 New York City mayoral election, John Lindsay campaigned on creating a civilian review board to review complaints against the department. Police commissioner Vincent L. Broderick opposed the review board so Lindsay chose not to appoint him when his term ended on February 21, 1966. Although Leary believed review boards were unnecessary and unfair to police officers, he had worked with one in Philadelphia and agreed to work with one in New York City. On February 15, 1966, Lindsay announced that Leary would be the city's next police commissioner. He was the first NYPD commissioner to come from outside the state of New York. His appointment was supported by the NAACP, National Urban League, Congress of Racial Equality, and the Student Nonviolent Coordinating Committee. On July 11, 1966, 4 civilians chosen by Lindsay and 3 police officers selected by Leary were appointed to serve on the new review board. The board was short lived, as it was eliminated following a city referendum that November. It was replaced by a committee of five NYPD employees chosen by Leary.

On September 5, 1970, Leary announced his resignation effective October 1, 1970 to enter the private sector. His unexpected resignation came four months after Mayor Lindsay severely criticized the police for their lack of action during the Hard Hat Riot and during the Knapp Commission's investigation into corruption within the New York City Police Department. After his departure was announced, Leary received praise from both Mayor Lindsay and the Police Benevolent Association of the City of New York.

== Later life ==
On September 6, 1970, Abraham & Straus announced that Leary was joining the company as vice president in charge of security. From 1972 to 1982 he was a professor of criminal justice at Trenton State College.

Leary spent his later years in Solebury Township, Pennsylvania. He died on January 31, 1994, at Buckingham Valley Nursing Center in Buckingham Township, Bucks County, Pennsylvania.

Police appointments
Preceded by Albert N. Brown	Philadelphia Police Commissioner; 1963–1966	Succeeded by Edward J. Bell
Preceded by Vincent L. Broderick	New York City Police Commissioner; 1966–1970	Succeeded by Patrick V. Murphy
