= New York City Police Commissioner =

Head of the New York City Police Department

Police Commissioner of the City of New York
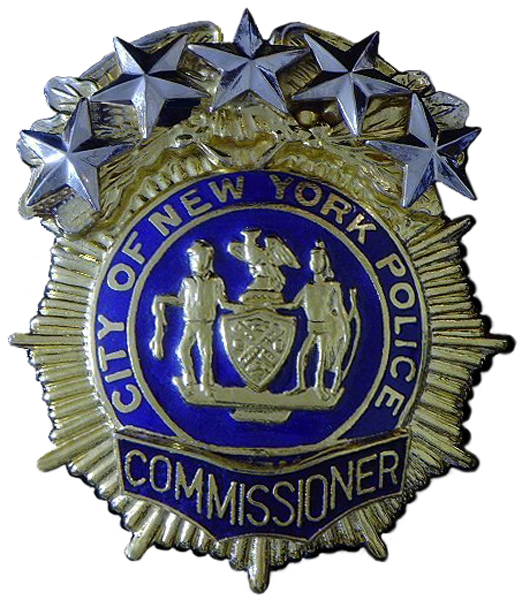
- New York Police Department Commissioner's shield

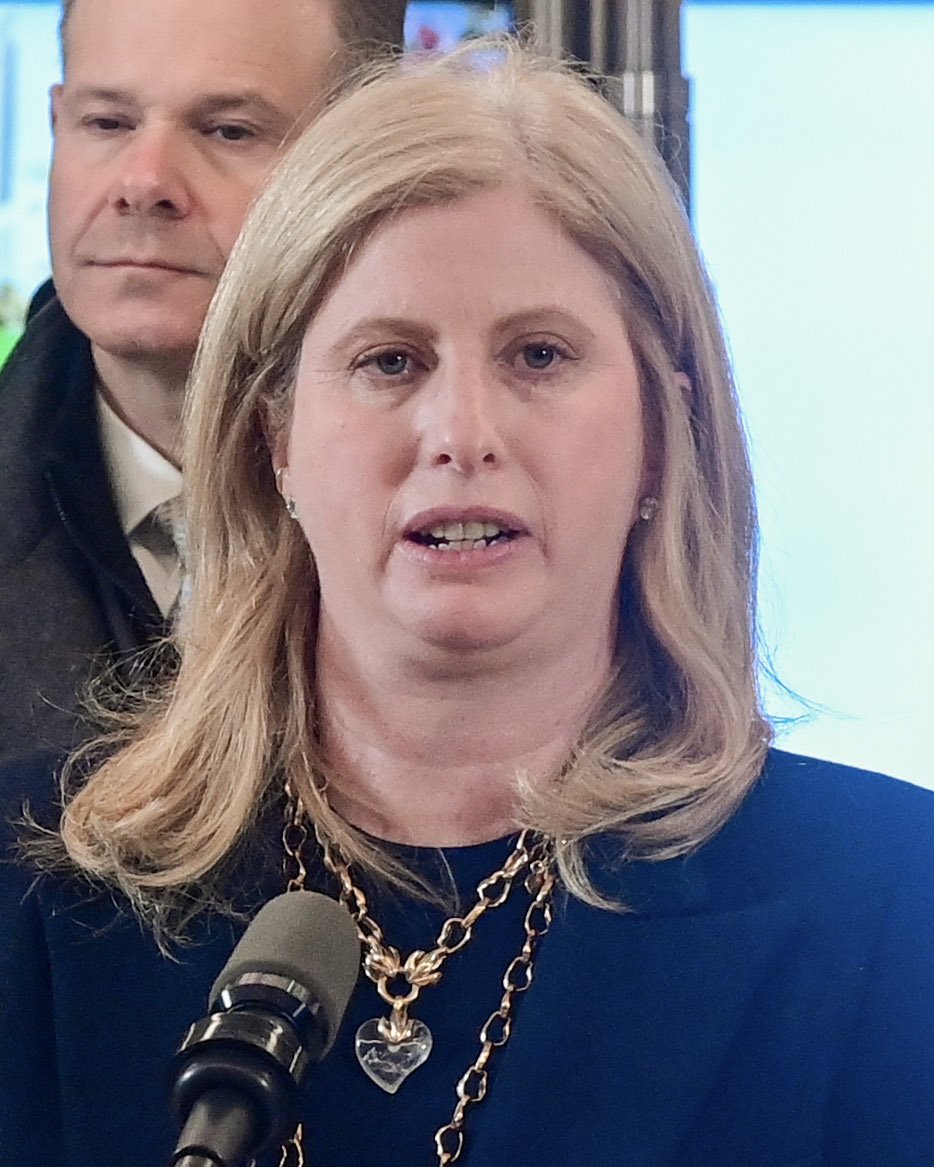
- Incumbent; Jessica Tisch since November 25, 2024
- Style: The Honorable (formal); Commissioner (informal)
- Appointer: Mayor of New York
- Term length: Five years; Renewable at mayor's pleasure
- Constituting instrument: New York City Charter
- Inaugural holder: George W. Matsell (as Superintendent)
- Formation: 1845
- Deputy: First Deputy Commissioner, Tania Kinsella
- Salary: $277,605 (2024)
- Website: www.nyc.gov/html/nypd/html/administration/commissioners_corner.shtml

The New York City police commissioner is the head of the New York City Police Department and presiding member of the Board of Commissioners. The commissioner is appointed by and serves at the pleasure of the mayor. The commissioner is responsible for the day-to-day operations of the department as well as the appointment of deputies including the chief of department and subordinate officers. Commissioners are civilian administrators, and they and their subordinate deputies are civilians under an oath of office, not sworn members of the force. This is a separate position from the chief of department, who is the senior sworn uniformed member of the force. The first deputy commissioner is the commissioner and department's second-in-command. The office of the police commissioner is located at the NYPD Headquarters, One Police Plaza. Both the commissioner and first deputy commissioner outrank all uniformed officers, including the chief of department.

Governor Benjamin Odell, on Friday, February 22, 1901 signed a bill abolishing the bipartisan board of four police commissioners and the office of chief of police, substituting them for a single commissioner to be in charge of the force. Michael Cotter Murphy, the NYPD's first police commissioner, would be sworn in shortly thereafter.

The commissioner's responsibilities include:

- To ensure the effective day-to-day operation of the department
- To appoint the board of commissioners, the chief of the Department and all subordinate officers
- To ensure the safety and protection of New York City and its population
- To ensure the department enforces city, state and federal law

== List of superintendents, chiefs, and commissioners ==
=== Pre-1901 ===
Prior to 1901, the New York City Police Department was run by a board of four to six commissioners. The following is a list of some of the most famous members of the Police Commission:

Presidents of the Board of Commissioners

Name	Dates in office	Mayoral administration
John G Bergen; Member of the Board of Police Commissioners	May 1860 - July 17, 1867	Governor Edwin D. Morgan
James Kelso; NYC Police Superintendent, NYC Police Commissioner	1869-1873	William M. Tweed
Henry Smith	1873–1874	William Frederick Havemeyer
Hugh Gardner	1874	William Frederick Havemeyer
George W. Matsell	1874–1875	William Frederick Havemeyer
William F. Smith	1877–1879	Smith Ely Jr., Edward Cooper
Stephen B. French	1880–1889	William R. Grace, Franklin Edson, Abram Hewitt
Charles F. McLean	1880–1889	Hugh J. Grant
James J. Martin	1892–1894	Hugh J. Grant, Thomas F. Gilroy
Theodore Roosevelt	1895–1897	William L. Strong
Frank Moss	1897	William L. Strong
Bernard J. York	1898–1900	Robert A. Van Wyck

Members of the Board of Commissioners

- George Washington Matsell, 1845–1857, Superintendent
- John Alexander Kennedy, 1860–1863, Superintendent
- Abram Duryée, 1873–1874, Commissioner
- George Washington Walling, 1874–1885, Superintendent
- William Farrar Smith, 1875–1881, President of the Board of Commissioners
- Fitz John Porter, 1884–1888, Commissioner
- Frederick Dent Grant, 1894–1898, Commissioner
- Theodore Roosevelt, 1895–1897, President of the Board of Commissioners
- John McCullagh, 1897–1898, Superintendent
- John B. Sexton, 1898–1901, Commissioner
- William Stephen Devery, May 21, 1898 – June 30, 1898 (acting), June 30, 1898 – February 22, 1901. The superintendent title was changed to Chief of Police in 1898. Devery was the Police Department's last superintendent, and first chief.
- John McClintock (police commissioner) Deputy Commissioner 1914

=== Post-1901 ===
Since 1901, a single commissioner has been in charge of the New York Police Department. The following is a list of the commissioners:

Name	Dates in office	Mayoral administration
Michael Cotter Murphy	February 22, 1901 – January 1, 1902	Robert Van Wyck
John Nelson Partridge	January 1, 1902 – January 1, 1903	Seth Low
Francis Vinton Greene	January 1, 1903 – January 1, 1904	Seth Low
William McAdoo	January 1, 1904 – January 1, 1906	George B. McClellan Jr.
Theodore A. Bingham	January 1, 1906 – July 1, 1909	George B. McClellan Jr.
William Frazer Baker	July 1, 1909 – October 20, 1910	George B. McClellan Jr.
William Frazer Baker	July 1, 1909 – October 20, 1910	William Jay Gaynor
James Church Cropsey	October 20, 1910 – May 23, 1911	William Jay Gaynor
Rhinelander Waldo	May 23, 1911 – December 31, 1913	William Jay Gaynor
Rhinelander Waldo	May 23, 1911 – December 31, 1913	Ardolph Loges Kline
Douglas Imrie McKay	December 31, 1913 – April 8, 1914	Ardolph Loges Kline
Douglas Imrie McKay	December 31, 1913 – April 8, 1914	John Purroy Mitchel
Arthur Hale Woods	April 8, 1914 – January 1, 1918	John Purroy Mitchel
Frederick Hamilton Bugher	January 1, 1918 – January 23, 1918 (acting)	John Francis Hylan
Richard Edward Enright	January 23, 1918 – December 30, 1925	John Francis Hylan
George Vincent McLaughlin	January 1, 1926 – April 12, 1927	Jimmy Walker
Joseph A. Warren	April 12, 1927 – December 18, 1928	Jimmy Walker
Grover Aloysius Whalen	December 18, 1928 – May 21, 1930	Jimmy Walker
Edward Pierce Mulrooney	May 21, 1930 – April 11, 1933	Jimmy Walker
Edward Pierce Mulrooney	May 21, 1930 – April 11, 1933	Joseph V. McKee
Edward Pierce Mulrooney	May 21, 1930 – April 11, 1933	John P. O'Brien
James S. Bolan	April 15, 1933 – January 1, 1934	John P. O'Brien
John Francis O'Ryan	January 1, 1934 – September 25, 1934	Fiorello H. La Guardia
Lewis Joseph Valentine	September 25, 1934 – September 14, 1945	Fiorello H. La Guardia
Albert O. Williams	September 14, 1945 – September 23, 1945 (acting)	Fiorello H. La Guardia
Arthur William Wallander	September 23, 1945 – February 28, 1949	William O'Dwyer
William P. O'Brien	February 28, 1949 – September 25, 1950	William O'Dwyer
Thomas Francis Murphy	February 21, 1950 – July 6, 1951	Vincent R. Impellitteri
George P. Monaghan	July 9, 1951 – December 31, 1953	Vincent R. Impellitteri
Francis William Holbrooke Adams	January 1, 1954 – August 2, 1955	Robert F. Wagner Jr.
Stephen P. Kennedy	August 2, 1955 – February 23, 1961	Robert F. Wagner Jr.
Michael J. Murphy	February 23, 1961 – June 7, 1965	Robert F. Wagner Jr.
Vincent Lyons Broderick	June 7, 1965 – February 21, 1966	Robert F. Wagner Jr.
Vincent Lyons Broderick	June 7, 1965 – February 21, 1966	John Lindsay
Howard R. Leary	February 21, 1966 – October 9, 1970	John Lindsay
Patrick V. Murphy	October 9, 1970 – May 14, 1973	John Lindsay
Donald Cawley	May 14, 1973 – January 1, 1974	John Lindsay
Michael Codd	January 1, 1974 – January 1, 1978	Abraham D. Beame
Robert J. McGuire	January 1, 1978 – December 30, 1983	Edward I. Koch
William J. Devine	December 30, 1983 – January 1, 1984	Edward I. Koch
Benjamin Ward	January 1, 1984 – October 23, 1989	Edward I. Koch
Richard J. Condon	October 23, 1989 – January 22, 1990	Edward I. Koch
Lee Patrick Brown	January 22, 1990 – September 1, 1992	David N. Dinkins
Raymond Walter Kelly	September 1, 1992 – October 16, 1992 (acting); October 16, 1992 – January 10, 1994	David N. Dinkins
William Joseph Bratton	January 10, 1994 – April 15, 1996	Rudolph W. Giuliani
Howard Safir	April 15, 1996 – August 19, 2000	Rudolph W. Giuliani
Bernard Bailey Kerik	August 19, 2000 – January 1, 2002	Rudolph W. Giuliani
Raymond Walter Kelly	January 1, 2002 – January 1, 2014 (second appointment)	Michael R. Bloomberg
William Joseph Bratton	January 1, 2014 – September 16, 2016 (second appointment)	Bill de Blasio
James P. O'Neill	September 16, 2016 – November 30, 2019	Bill de Blasio
Dermot F. Shea	December 1, 2019 – December 31, 2021	Bill de Blasio
Keechant Sewell	January 1, 2022 – June 30, 2023	Eric Adams
Edward A. Caban	July 1, 2023 – July 17, 2023 (acting); July 17, 2023 – September 13, 2024	Eric Adams
Thomas G. Donlon	September 13, 2024 – November 25, 2024 (acting)	Eric Adams
Jessica Tisch	November 25, 2024 – current	Eric Adams (2024–2025); Zohran Mamdani (2026–)

== In popular culture ==
In the police procedural television show Blue Bloods, the fictional New York City police commissioner Frank Reagan is played by Tom Selleck. His father, Henry Reagan, played by Len Cariou, is a former commissioner.

The historical documentary miniseries Theodore Roosevelt depicts the life and political career of President Theodore Roosevelt, which includes Roosevelt’s time as the New York City Police Commissioner in which he worked to rid the NYPD of corruption and the frequent abuse of power by officers.

== Salary ==
The public disclosure of salary as of 2020 is approximately $205,180.00 base, which is considered in line with what most large US cities pay their respective chief of police, and a bit lower than that of the chief of the Los Angeles Police Department.

== Gallery ==
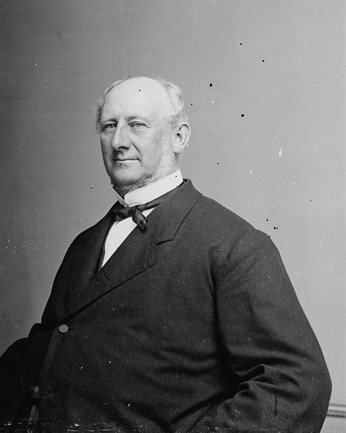
Simeon Draper, who was one of the original 1857 Board of Police Commissioners

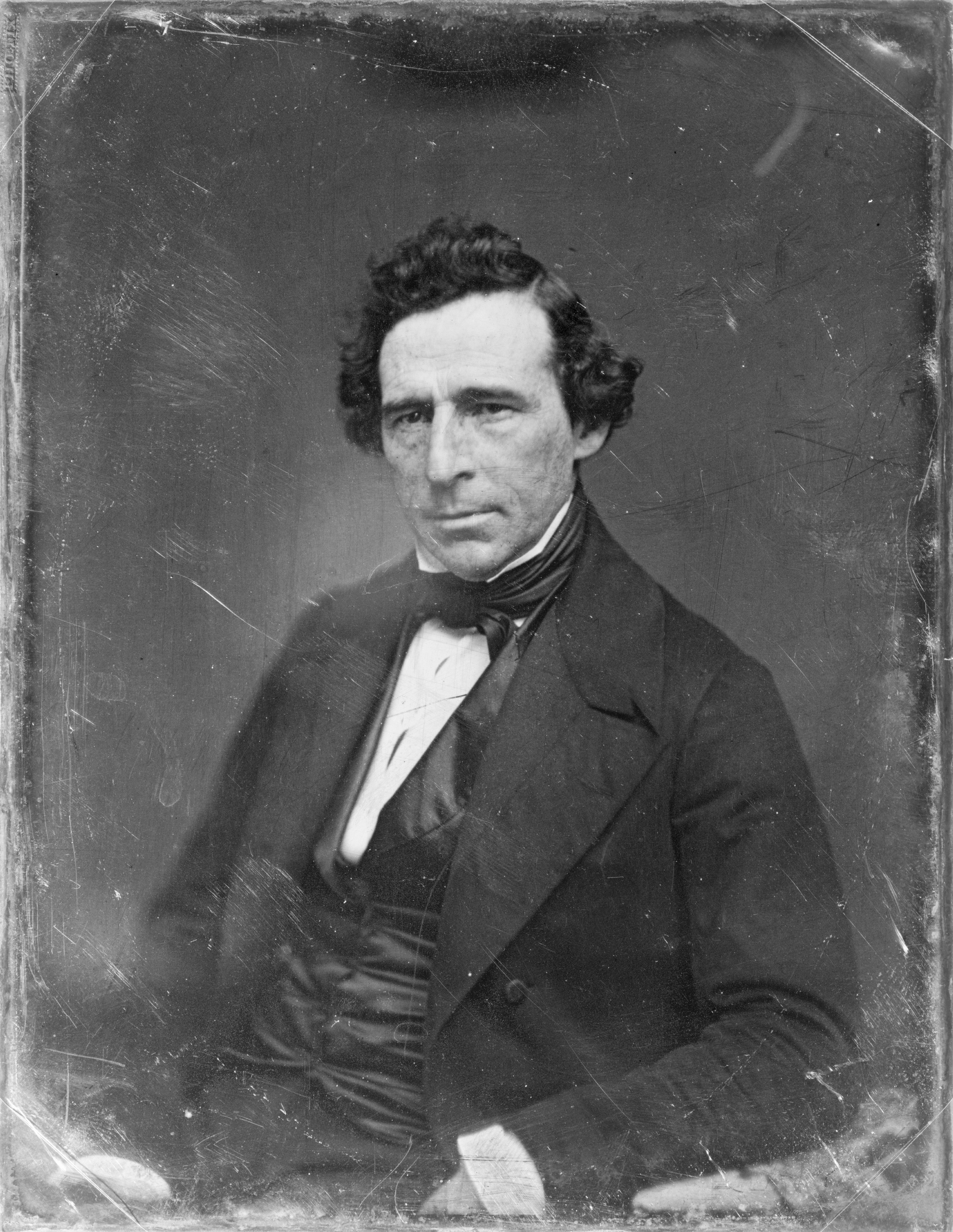
New York Police Department Superintendent John Alexander Kennedy

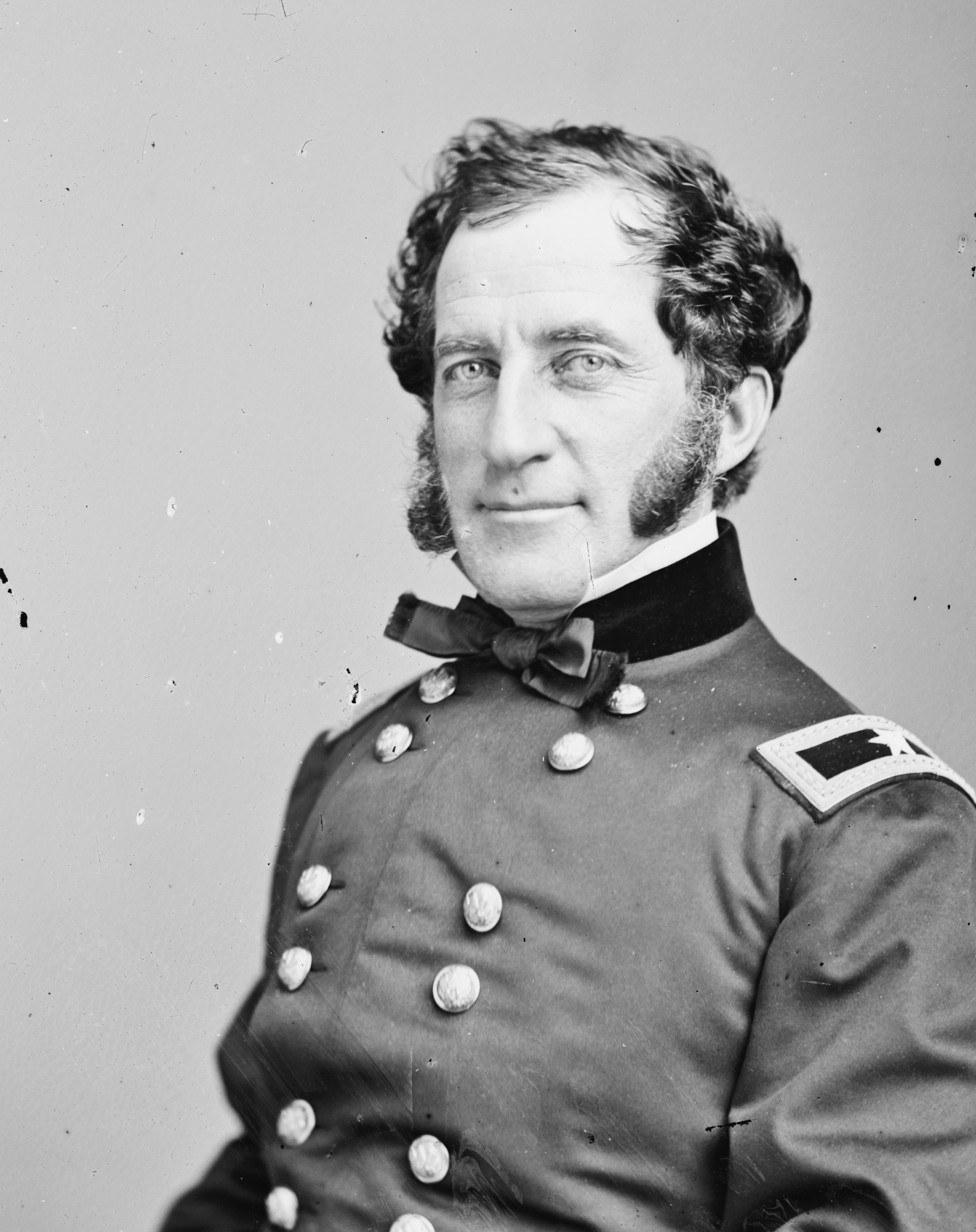
Abram Duryée

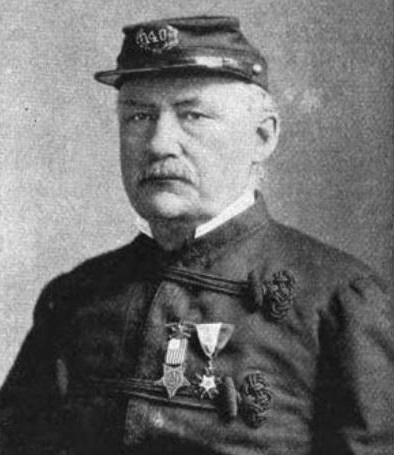
Joel B. Erhardt

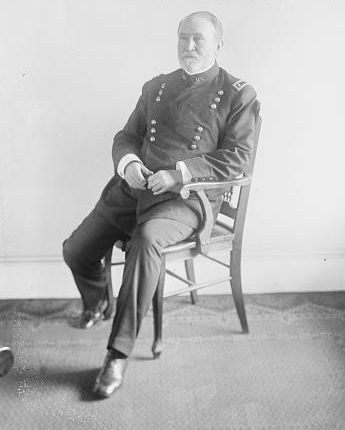
Frederick Dent Grant

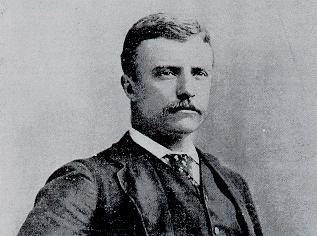
Theodore Roosevelt

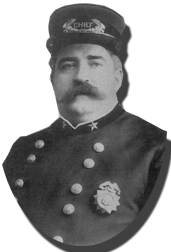
William S. Devery

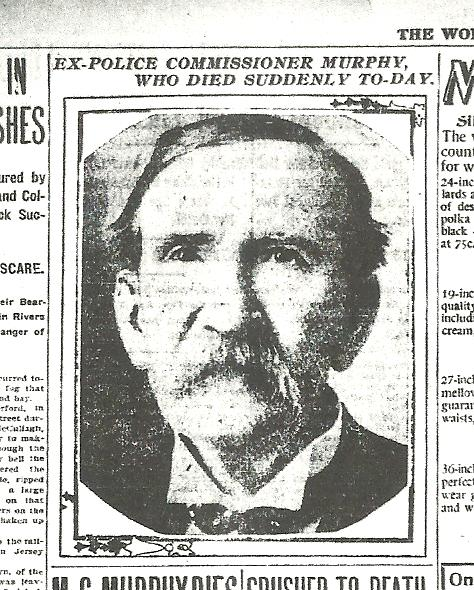
Michael Cotter Murphy

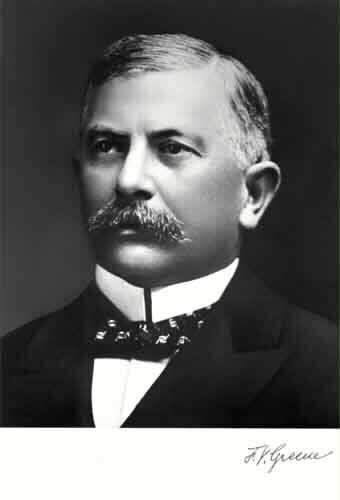
Francis Vinton Greene

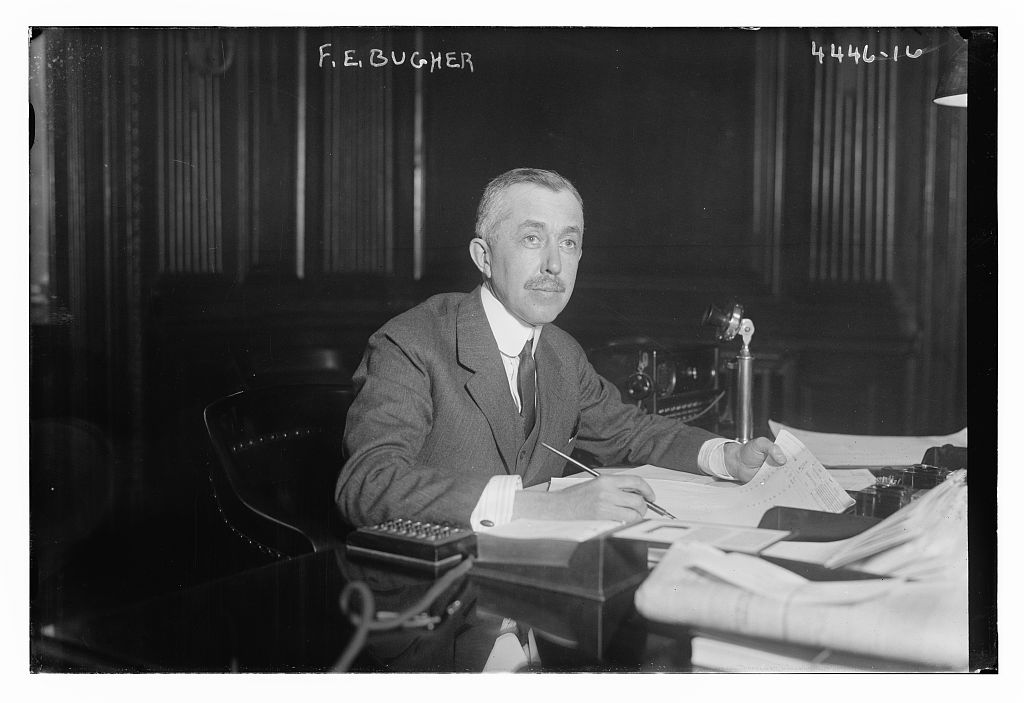
Frederick Hamilton Bugher in 1918

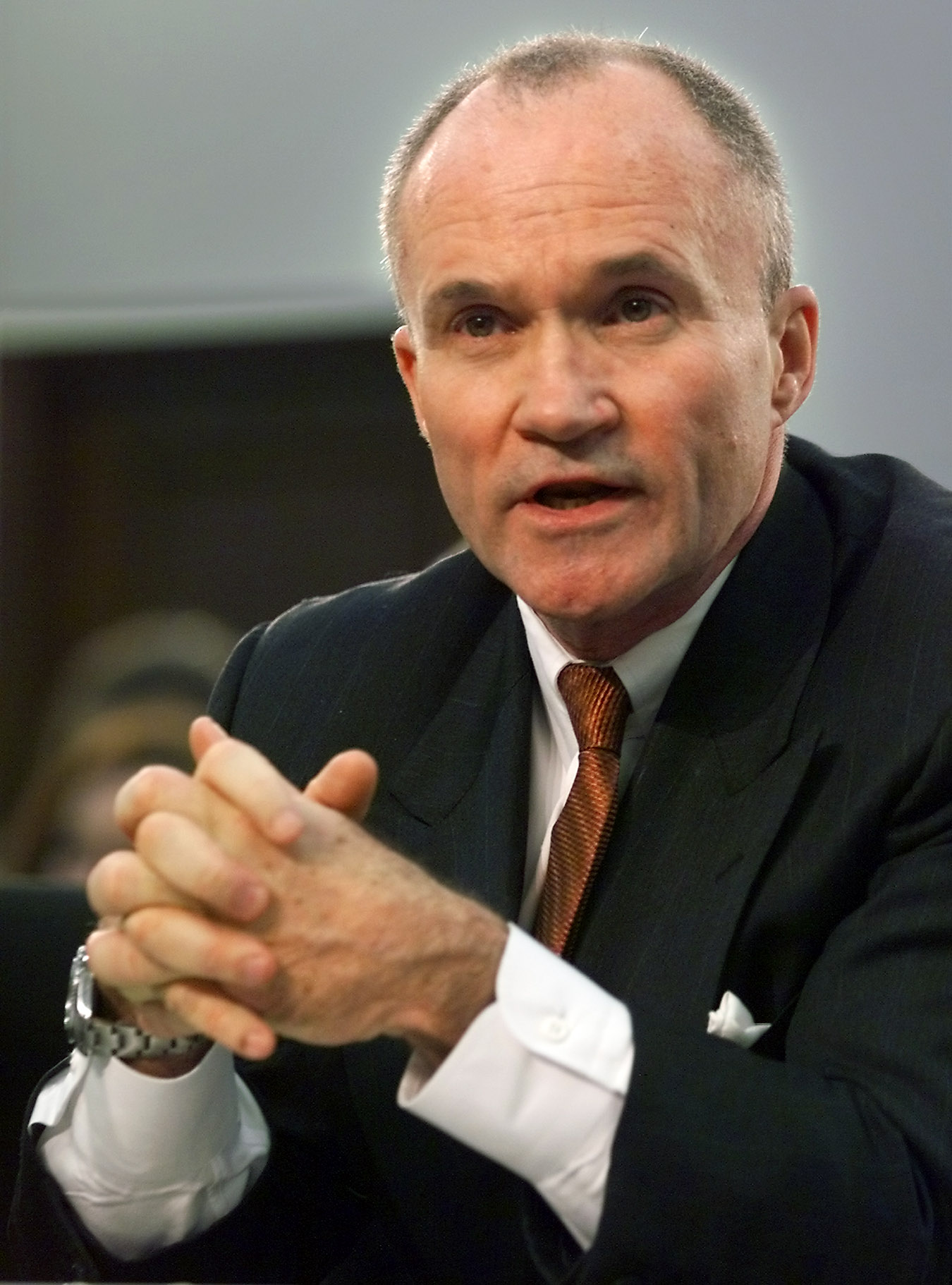
Raymond W. Kelly

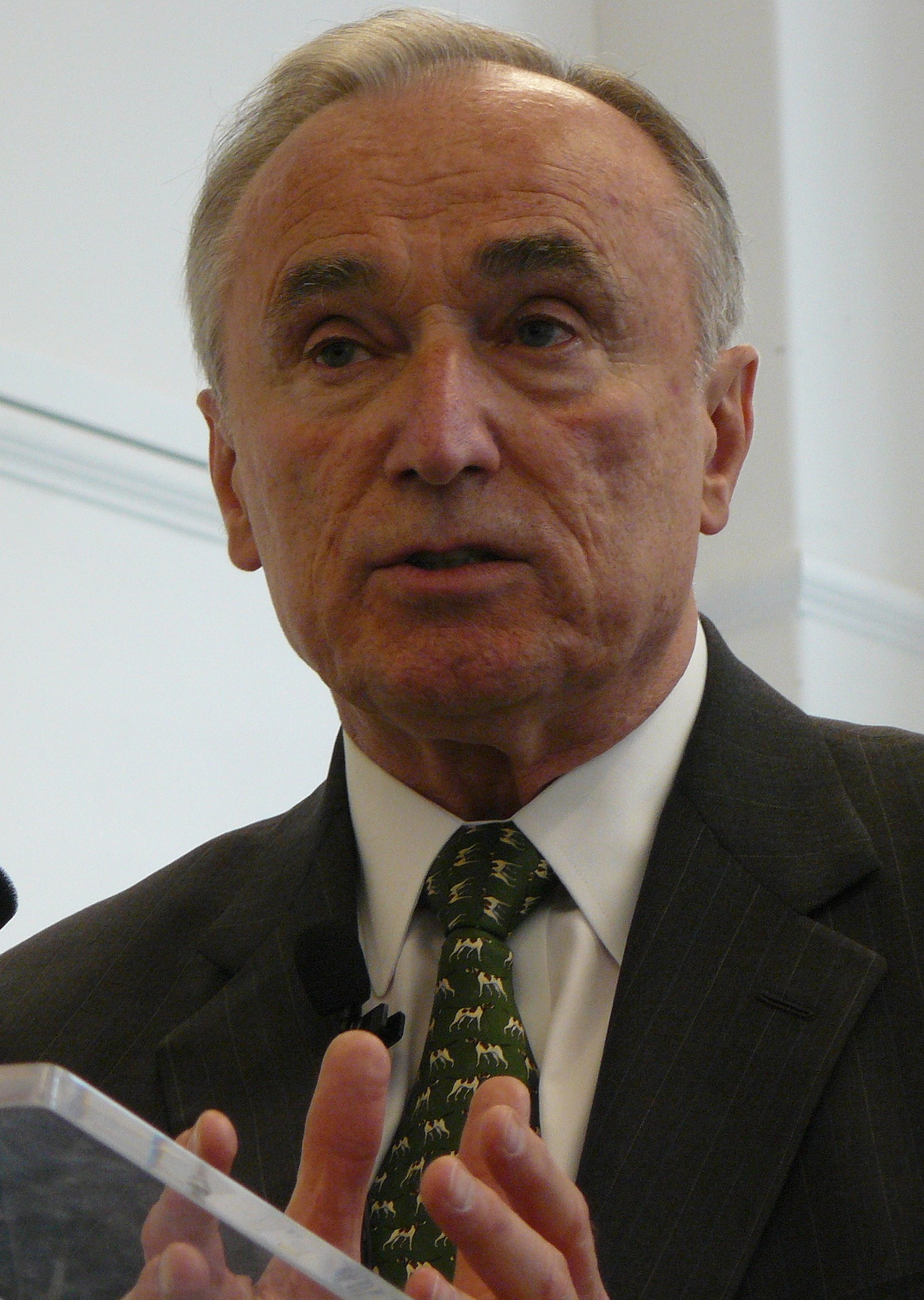
William J. Bratton

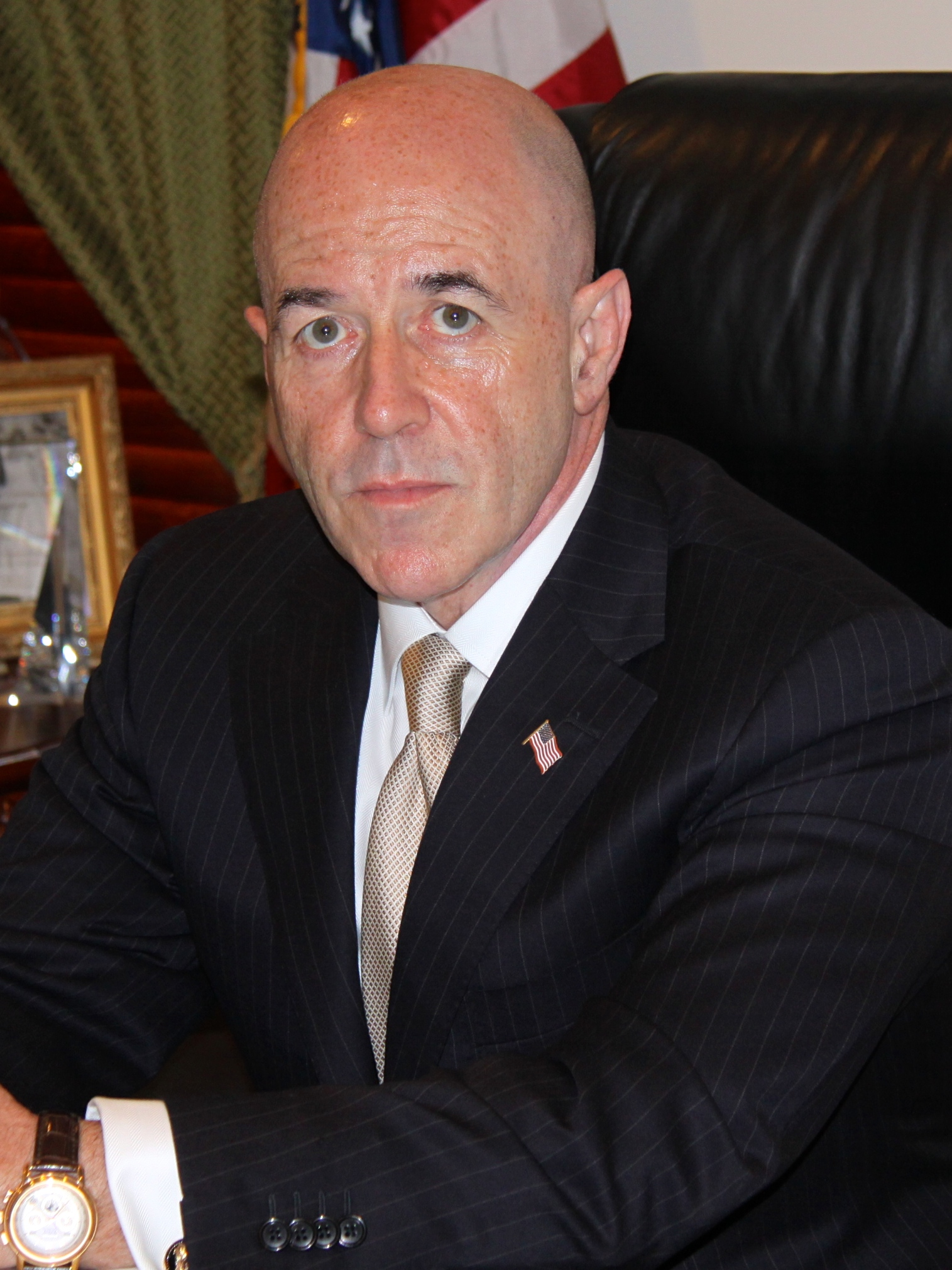
Bernard Kerik

== See also ==
- Lists of New York City topics
- List of New York City Police Department officers
