= Masjid Malcolm Shabazz =

Mosque located in Harlem, New York

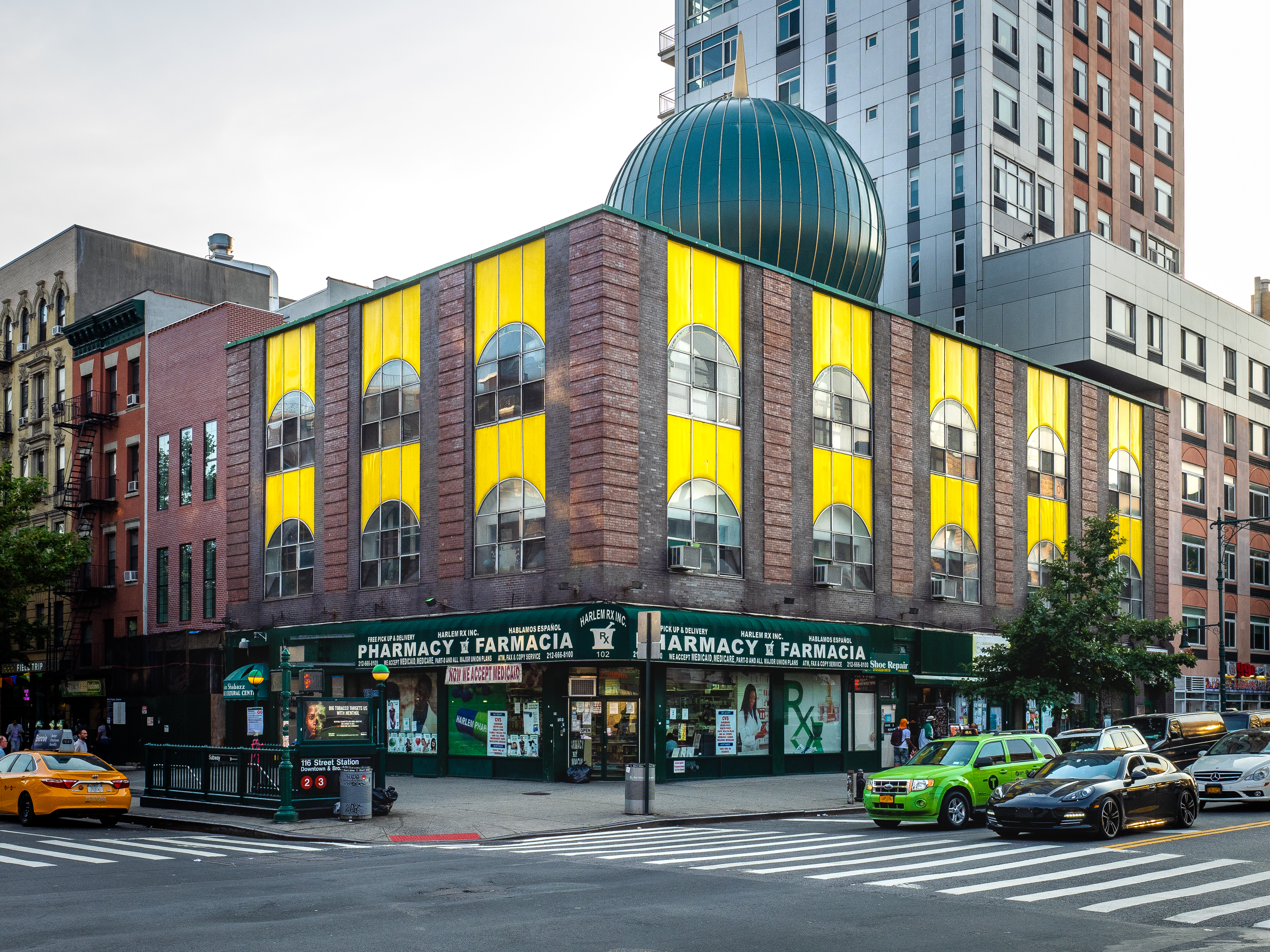
- Masjid Malcolm Shabazz (2019)

Religion
- Affiliation: Sunni Islam

Location
- Location: Harlem, New York, United States
- Interactive map of Masjid Malcolm Shabazz
- Coordinates: 40°48′07″N 73°57′01″W

Architecture
- Architect: Sabbath Brown
- Type: Mosque
- Dome: 1

Website
- themasjidmalcolmshabazz.com

The Masjid Malcolm Shabazz is a mosque which hosts a Sunni Islam congregation in Harlem, New York City. Formerly Mosque No. 7, it was originally a Nation of Islam mosque under Elijah Muhammad's leadership until after his death in 1975, when his son Wallace D. Muhammad reoriented the organization's philosophy towards Sunni Islam. In 1976, Wallace D. Muhammad renamed the mosque in honor of Malik el-Shabazz (Malcolm X), who had preached in Mosque No. 7 until 1964, before he left the Nation of Islam to become a Sunni Muslim.

== History ==
Opened as Temple No. 7 of the Nation of Islam (NOI) at the Harlem YMCA in 1946 (all Nation of Islam sites were initially called Temples; the NOI switched to the term mosque as a move to add to the Nation's legitimacy by adding elements from mainstream Islam), it was moved to Lenox Casino at 102 West 116th Street on the southwest corner of Lenox Avenue and it "was just a storefront in 1954 when Malcolm was named minister by Elijah Muhammad." When Malcolm X split from Elijah Muhammad in 1964, he started a Sunni Muslim mosque named the Muslim Mosque Inc. The successor to that mosque is The Mosque of Islamic Brotherhood Inc. at 130 West 113th Street, in Harlem.

In January 1964, Elijah Muhammad stripped Malcolm X of his offices and promoted James 3X as the new minister of Mosque No. 7. The building was destroyed in a bombing in 1965 after Malcolm's assassination, which forced the Nation of Islam to move the mosque to 106 West 127th Street. The building was redesigned by Sabbath Brown, and in 1976 the mosque was renamed Malcolm Shabazz Mosque, (by Wallace D. Muhammad, the new leader of the Nation of Islam), or Masjid Malcolm Shabazz, to honor the memory and contributions of Malcolm X.

In 1972, the mosque was the location of a controversial shooting of a NYPD officer.

At 19 years of age in 1984, Conrad Tillard converted to Islam, joined the Nation of Islam, and became known as Conrad X, and later as Conrad Muhammad. At 25 years of age he was appointed the Minister of Mosque No. 7, and The Boston Globe described him as the heir-apparent of NOI head Louis Farrakhan. Tillard left the Nation of Islam in 1997.

In 1989, Farrakhan appointed Muhammad Abdul Aziz, who had been convicted of the 1965 murder of Malcolm X but proclaimed his innocence, as chief of security for the mosque. The New York Times saw the appointment as a move to clear Aziz's name, and push for a re-opening of the investigation of the assassination. Aziz's conviction was overturned in 2021.

== Imamship under Talib Abdur-Rashid ==
Imam Talib Abdur-Rahman served as the Imam of Masjid Malcolm Shabazz for 3 decades. He largely shaped Harlem's Sunni Muslim community, and had an immense social responsibility of the Sunni community. At the Masjid Malcolm Shabazz, Imam Talib Abdur-Rashid introduced Islamic classes, gave Friday sermons, and conducted charity programs.

One of the most imperative changes that occurred under Talib Abdur-Rashid's Imamship at Masjid Malcolm Shabazz is the public broadcast of the Islamic call to prayer, the adhan. This occurred through a loud speaker, under a New York City policy change.

At the Masjid Malcolm Shabazz, Imam Talib Abdur-Rashid was at the helm when the Masjid when it changed to a widespread Islamic leadership, including Majlis Ash-Shura of New York and Harlem Shura. He later connected this to regional religious authorities. Through these changes, the Masjid began to talk about poverty, education, housing problems, especially in the interfaith dialogue. Through his continuous work as an imam and MIB's institutional umbrella, he kept this section of the mosque's spread alive.

Moreover, Abdur-Rashid participated in molding urban policy debates that might have impacted MIB's community. From urging the provision of halal food in New York public schools to the observance of Eid as a school holiday: all matters that impacted the mosque's relationship with the community it is surrounded by. For instance, after the NYPD was spying on Muslim New Yorkers after the 9/11 hijacks, on behalf of the MIB community he publicly discussed civil rights and freedom of religion. During his administration all of these factors came together to strengthen MIB's standing as a prominent Sunni Muslim organization in Harlem, and set the organization on a path that continued beyond his death in 2025.

== See also ==
- List of mosques in North America
- Lists of mosques
- List of mosques in the United States
- Bibliography of Malcolm X
- Bibliography of Martin Luther King Jr.
