= Patrick V. Murphy =

American police officer (1920–2011)

New York City Police Commissioner
- In office 1970–1973
- Preceded by: Howard R. Leary
- Succeeded by: Donald Cawley

Police Commissioner of Detroit
- In office 1969–1970
- Preceded by: George Edwards
- Succeeded by: John Nichols

Personal details
- Born: May 15, 1920 Brooklyn, New York, U.S.
- Died: December 16, 2011 (aged 91) North Carolina, U.S.
- Education: St. John's University (New York), City College of New York, FBI National Academy
- Profession: Police officer, reformer

Military service
- Branch/service: United States Navy
- Years of service: World War II
- Rank: Pilot

Patrick Vincent Murphy (May 15, 1920 – December 16, 2011) served as the top law enforcement executive in New York City, Detroit, Washington, DC, and Syracuse, New York. He created the Police Executive Research Forum, an organization of police executives from the nation's largest city, county, and state law enforcement agencies, and led the Police Foundation in a period when it published pivotal reports on issues ranging from the police use of deadly force to the efficient use of patrol resources. Murphy's "long-range impact on American policing nationally probably will be judged by students of police history as significant as that of August Vollmer (a notable police reformer in the first half of the 20th century) or J. Edgar Hoover," the FBI's Law Enforcement Bulletin commented in a 1986 cover story on the Police Foundation.

== Education and early years ==
Murphy was educated in Catholic elementary and high schools in his native Brooklyn. He married Martha E. Cameron in 1945. The son, brother, and, eventually, uncle of New York City police officers, Murphy joined the New York Police Department in 1945 after serving as a Navy pilot during World War II.

His first foot patrol was in the Red Hook section of Brooklyn. While on the job, he earned a Bachelor of Arts degree from St. John's University and Master of Public Administration (honors) degree from City College of New York. He also graduated from the FBI National Academy.

By 1962, Murphy was a deputy inspector when the department gave him an 18-month leave of absence to become the reform police chief in Syracuse "which found itself in a nasty corruption scandal." He returned to the NYPD in 1964 and left the next year with the rank of deputy chief.

== Washington, D.C., and Detroit ==
In 1965, the Johnson administration appointed Murphy assistant director of the new Office of Law Enforcement Assistance. The U.S. Justice Department agency was located in Washington whose police department, like "many other police forces in the country, had poor relations with minority communities. But to permit the local police force, operating in the shadow of the White House, to remain in such a circumstance was … risk taking at its worst," Murphy wrote in his memoirs. To begin to improve those relations, Murphy was appointed the District of Columbia's first director of public safety, in charge of both the police and fire departments, in 1967.

The jobs in Syracuse and Washington underscored two of Murphy's principal concerns. Throughout his "illustrious career in policing, Murphy earned a reputation as a fierce advocate of reform, particularly with regard to police corruption and race relations," according to Charles R. Epp, a public affairs professor at the University of Kansas.

In his memoirs, Murphy notes he fought off strenuous resistance from his police chief and a powerful congressional chairman whose committee controlled the DC department to appoint Jerry Wilson, a talented young commander, as assistant chief of field operations. He says that Wilson emphasized restraint in planning and implementing major changes for the prevention and control of disorders. Murphy credits these changes with minimizing violence in the April 1968 DC rioting that followed the assassination of Martin Luther King Jr.

"Murphy dispersed the mob as gently, and with as few arrests, as possible," The New York Times reported. "His statement that he would resign rather than order the shootings of looters was widely quoted, with approval in liberal circles and as a sure sign of anarchy by the right."

Congress established the Law Enforcement Assistance Administration in 1968 to fund state and local law enforcement agencies and crime-fighting research and development programs. In October, the Johnson administration nominated Murphy to be the agency's first leader. But the Senate was bogged down in other matters and Murphy was never confirmed. He left his post a few months after the start of the Nixon administration in 1969 and served as a consultant to the Washington, DC–based Urban Institute. Then Mayor Roman S. Gribbs summoned Murphy to become police commissioner in Detroit in the first days of 1970, where he promoted future Chief William Hart to lieutenant, but a burgeoning scandal in his home NYPD soon drew him from Detroit.

== Return to New York City ==
In April, 1970 The New York Times launched a series of articles that, in the words of series author David Burnham, charged that "policemen in the city were receiving millions of dollars in graft and that top police officials and members of Mayor John V. Lindsay's staff had ignored specific allegations of grafting." Lindsay sought out a corruption-fighter to run the department and six months after the scandal broke, Murphy returned to the NYPD as commissioner.

Murphy quickly began "changing his department irrevocably … (he) put in place systems to hold supervisors and administrators strictly accountable for the integrity and civility of their personnel… He rewarded cops who turned in corrupt or brutal colleagues and punished those who, although personally honest, looked the other way when they learned of misconduct," according to criminal justice scholars Jerome H. Skolnick and James J. Fyfe. They write that "Murphy used his three and a half years in office to create an environment that loudly and clearly condemned abusive police conduct, those who engage in it and – equally important – those who tolerate it."

In August 1972, after overseeing the most corrupt police department in NYC history, per the Knapp Commission, Murphy introduced a new policy restricting "the use of deadly force to situations involving the defense of life, replacing the traditional 'fleeing felon' rule. The policy also prohibited discharging firearms as warning shots, as calls for assistance, or at or from moving vehicles," writes Samuel Walker, a criminal justice professor at the University of Nebraska. Murphy's defense-of-life policy "was a radical innovation. To be fair, there were undoubtedly other law enforcement agencies that already had restrictive policies... The important point, however, is that none had the lasting national impact on policy that New York City's had. Within a matter of a few years, the defense-of-life policy was the standard policy in major cities across the country."

== Police Foundation ==
In late 1973, Murphy became president of the Police Foundation, which the Ford Foundation established in 1970 with a $30 million commitment. The purpose was to foster innovation and improvement in American policing.

Under Murphy's watch, the foundation published more than 30 books and reports on matters ranging from police corruption to firearm abuse to policewomen on patrol to domestic violence and the police. A study on the police use of deadly force found that in the mid-1970s police agencies differed widely in their policies governing the use of deadly force, but that there appeared to be increased restraint in police use of firearms.

Perhaps the most notable of its publications was the report of a foundation experiment set in Kansas City, Missouri, that concluded that the accepted police strategy of routine preventive patrol in cars had no significant effect on crime rates, citizen fear of crime, or citizen satisfaction with police service. These results "suggested that it is not sufficient to merely assign uniformed officers to random patrol and that more sophisticated means of deploying personnel may be necessary," according to Police Administration.

Not all of the foundation's resources went to research. In 1975, Murphy enlisted the help of ten police chiefs from large jurisdictions around the country to help him create the Police Executive Research Forum. The foundation provided generous start-up funding, and the forum was formally incorporated in 1977. Murphy envisioned an organization the forum has become – in its words on its web site, "a national membership organization of progressive police executives from the largest city, county, and state law enforcement agencies … dedicated to improving policing and advancing professionalism through research and involvement in public policy debate." The forum now has 1,500 general and subscribing members.

During Murphy's tenure, the foundation also assisted in the development of the National Organization of Black Law Enforcement Executives (NOBLE) and assembled the National Advisory Commission on Higher Education for Police Officers. The commission's 300-page report issued 43 recommendations designed to upgrade the quality of police higher education.

At the 1980 conference of the International Association of Chiefs of Police, delegates rejected by a 4–1 margin a resolution introduced by Murphy calling for departmental restrictions on the use of deadly force. Instead, the delegates affirmed the traditional fleeing felon rule.

Murphy continued to speak out on the matter and in 1982 the IACP leadership censured him "for his ongoing criticism of traditional police practices," Epp writes. "The issue was widely covered in terms unfavorable to the IACP. The New York Times gave front-page coverage to the story on July 8, 1982." About 150 similar stories, "all unfavorable to the IACP, appeared in other newspaper and magazines." Several large-city police chiefs opposed the IACP's censure of Murphy and the executive directors of the National League of Cities, the International City Management Association, and the United States Conference of Mayors issued a letter criticizing the action.

In 1985, the Supreme Court in Tennessee v. Garner decreed that it was reasonable "for the police to use deadly force to defend life or to apprehend armed and dangerous felony suspects, but shooting nonviolent fleeing property crime suspects was a form of unreasonable seizure that violated the Fourth Amendment and that therefore must be forbidden." This was in line with the shooting policy Murphy introduced to NYPD in 1972.

Murphy retired from the foundation in 1985. He taught at John Jay College of Criminal Justice from 1985 to 1987 and was director of the police policy board of the United States Conference of Mayors from 1985 to 1998.

== Death and legacy ==
With his wife, Murphy had eight children, 21 grandchildren, and 17 great-grandchildren at the time of his death. He died in 2011 at North Carolina of complications from a heart attack. He was 91.

The Patrick V. Murphy Papers are housed in the Special Collections of the Lloyd Sealy Library, John Jay College of Criminal Justice.

Police appointments
| Preceded by ? | Chief of Police, Syracuse, NY; 1963–1964 | Succeeded by ? |
| Preceded by Newly Created Position | Assistant Director, Law Enforcement Assistance Administration, United States Department of Justice; 1965–1967 | Succeeded by ? |
| Preceded by Newly Created Position | Director of Public Safety, Washington, DC; 1967–1969 | Succeeded by ? |
| Preceded by George Edwards | Police Commissioner, Detroit, MI; 1969-1970 | Succeeded by John Nichols |
| Preceded by Howard R. Leary | NYPD Commissioner; 1970–1973 | Succeeded by Donald Cawley |
