= Black Reel Award for Outstanding Television Documentary or Special =

Annual US television award

- Awarded for: Outstanding Television Documentary or Special
- Country: United States
- Presented by: Black Reel Awards for Television
- First award: 2001
- Currently held by: Tina (2021)
- Website: blackreelawards.com

This article lists the winners and nominees for the Black Reel Award for Outstanding Television Documentary or Special. This award is given to the directors and was first awarded during the 2001 ceremony. In May 2017 the category was moved from the film awards as part of the Black Reel Awards for Television honors thus resulting in two separate winners in 2017.

== Winners and nominees ==
Winners are listed first and highlighted in bold.

=== 2000s ===
Year	Documentary / Special	Network	Director	Ref
2001
2001	**Half Past Autumn: The Life and Works of Gordon Parks**	**Showtime**	**Craig Laurence Rice**	
2001	The BET 20th Anniversary Celebration	BET	Terri McCoy	
2001	Dave Chappelle: Killin' Them Softly	Comedy Central	Stan Lathan	
2001	That's Black Entertainment	Showtime	Walid Khaldi	
2001	Ali-Frazier I: One Nation...Divisible	HBO	Dave Anderson	
2002
2002	**Beyond Tara: The Extraordinary Life of Hattie McDaniel**	**AMC**	**Madison D. Lacy**	
2002	Marcus Garvey: Look for Me in the Whirlwind	PBS	Stanley Nelson	
2002	BET Walk of Fame: Patti LaBelle	BET	Glenn Weiss	
2002	32nd Image Awards	FOX	Terri McCoy	
2002	VH1 Divas: The One and Only Aretha Franklin	Vh1	Liz Imperio	
2003
2003	**Jim Brown: All American**	**HBO**	**Spike Lee**	
2003	Ralph Ellison: An American Journey	PBS	Avon Kirkland	
2003	Heroes of Black Comedy	Comedy Central	David Upshal & Ninder Billing	
2003	Inside TV Land: African-Americans in Television	TV Land		
2004
2004	**Hollywood Celebrates Denzel Washington: An American Cinematheque Tribute**	**AMC**	**Michael Dempsey**	
2004	Hell Up in Hollywood: Soul Cinema and the 1970s	AMC	Eric Anderson	
2004	Brother Outside: The Life of Bayard Rustin	PBS	Nancy D. Kates & Bennett Singer	
2004	The Murder of Emmett Till	PBS	Stanley Nelson	
2004	Unchained Memories: Readings from the Slave Narratives	PBS	Ed Bell & Thomas Lennon	
2005
2005	**American Beyond the Color Line with Henry Louis Gates Jr.**	**PBS**	**Mary Crisp & Daniel Percival**	
2005	Beyond Brown: Pursuing the Promise	PBS	Carol Bash, Lullie Haddad & Stanley Nelson	
2005	The N Word	Trio	Todd Williams	
2006
2006	**Unstoppable: A Conversation with Melvin Van Peebles, Gordon Parks & Ossie Davis**	**Black Starz!**	**Warrington Hudlin**	
2006	Slavery and the Making of America	PBS	Leslie D. Farrell, Chana Gazit, Dante James & Gail Pellett	
2006	Unforgivable Blackness: The Rise and Fall of Jack Johnson	PBS	Ken Burns	
2006	Chisholm '72 Unbought & Unbossed	PBS	Shola Lynch	
2006	Ring of Fire: The Emile Griffith Story	USA Network	Ron Berger & Dan Klores	
2007–2009	—N/a			

=== 2010s ===
Year	Documentary / Special	Network	Director	Ref
2010	—N/a			
2011
2011	**If God Is Willing and da Creek Don't Rise**	**HBO**	**Spike Lee**	
2011	The Black List: Volume Three	HBO	Timothy Greenfield-Sanders	
2012
2012	**Planet Rock: The Story of Hip-Hop and the Crack Generation**	**VH1**	**Rickard Lowe & Martin Torgoff**	
2012	Pray the Devil Back to Hell	PBS	Gini Reticker	
2012	The Latino List	HBO	Timothy Greenfield-Sanders	
2012	Black in Latin America	PBS	Ricardo Pollack & Ilana Trachtman	
2012	The Fab Five	ESPN	Jason Hehir	
2013
2013	**Brooklyn Boheme**	**Showtime**	**Nelson George**	
2013	The Announcement	ESPN	Nelson George	
2013	On the Shoulders of Giants	Showtime	Deborah Morales	
2013	Slavery by Another Name	PBS	Sam Pollard	
2013	Uprising: Hip Hop and the LA Riots	VH1	Mark Ford	
2014
2014	**Whoopi Goldberg Presents Moms Mabley**	**HBO**	**Whoopi Goldberg**	
2014	Dark Girls	OWN	Bill Duke	
2014	Venus vs.	ESPN	Ava DuVernay	
2014	Jimi Hendrix: Hear My Train a Comin'	PBS	Bob Smeaton	
2014	Made in America	Showtime	Ron Howard	
2015
2015	**Mr. Dynamite: The Rise of James Brown**	**HBO**	**Alex Gibney**	
2015	Finding the Funk	VH1	Nelson George	
2015	On the Run Tour: Beyoncé and Jay-Z	HBO	Jonas Åkerlund	
2015	The Tanning of America: One Nation Under Hip-Hop	VH1	Billy Corben	
2015	Terror at the Mall	HBO	Dan Reed	
2016
2016	**The Wiz Live!**	**NBC**	**Kenny Leon**	
2016	3 ½ Minutes	HBO	Marc Silver	
2016	Holler If You Hear Me: Black and Gay in the Church	BET	Clay Cane	
2016	Kareem: Minority of One	HBO	Clare Lewins	
2016	Stevie Wonder Songs in the Key of Life: An All-Star Grammy Tribute	CBS	Leon Knoles	
2017
2017	**Lemonade**	**HBO**	**Beyoncé Knowles and Khalil Joseph**	
2017	Black America Since MLK: Still I Rise	HBO	Talleah Bridges	
2017	Hamilton's America	PBS	Alex Horowitz	
2017	Jackie Robinson	HBO	Ken Burns	
2017	Streets of Compton	A&E	Leon Knoles	
2017
2017	**Time: The Kalief Browder Story**	**Spike TV**	**Jenner Furst**	
2017	LA 92	National Geographic	T.J. Martin & Daniel Lindsay	
2017	The Lost Tapes: LA Riots	Smithsonian Channel	Tom Jennings	
2017	L.A. Burning: The Riots 25 Years Later	A&E	One9 & Erik Parker	
2017	Rodney King	Netflix	Spike Lee	
2018
2018	**The Defiant Ones**	**HBO**	**Allen Hughes**	
2018	Being Serena	HBO	Noah Lerner	
2018	Jesus Christ Superstar Live in Concert	NBC	David Leveaux & Alex Rudzinski	
2018	Biggie: The Life of Notorious B.I.G.	A&E	Mark Ford	
2018	Def Comedy Jam 25	Netflix	Louis J. Horvitz	
2019
2019	**Surviving R. Kelly**	**Lifetime**	**Nigel Bellis & Astral Finnie**	
2019	Rest in Power: The Trayvon Martin Story	Paramount Network	Jenner Furst, Julia Willoughby Nason	
2019	Wu-Tang Clan: Of Mics and Men	Showtime	Sacha Jenkins	
2019	Say Her Name: The Life and Death of Sandra Bland	HBO	Kate Davis & David Heilbroner	
2019	HΘMΣCΘMING	Netflix	Beyoncé & Ed Burke	

=== 2020s ===
Year	Documentary / Special	Network	Director	Ref
2020
2020	**The Last Dance**	**ESPN**	**Jason Hehir**	
2020	Becoming	Netflix	Nadia Hallgren	
2020	Let's Go Crazy: The Grammy Salute to Prince	CBS	David Wild	
2020	Hitsville: The Making of Motown	Showtime	Ben Turner & Gabe Turner	
2020	Who Killed Malcolm X?	Netflix	Rachel Dretzin & Phil Bertelsen	
2021
2021	**Tina**	**HBO**	**T.J. Martin & Dan Lindsay**	
2021	Black Is King	Disney+	Beyoncé, Kwasi Fordjour, Emmanuel Adjei, Blitz Bazawule, Ibra Ake, Jenn Nkiru, Jake Nava, Pierre Debusschere, Dikayl Rimmasch, Dafe Oboro	
2021	High on the Hog: How African American Cuisine Transformed America	Netflix	Stephen Satterfield	
2021	The Fresh Prince of Bel-Air Reunion	HBO Max	Marcus Raboy	
2021	First Ladies: Michelle Obama	CNN	Liz Mermin	

== Total awards by network ==
- HBO - 7
- AMC - 2
- Showtime - 2
- Black Starz! - 1
- ESPN - 1
- Lifetime - 1
- NBC - 1
- PBS - 1
- Spike TV - 1
- VH1 - 1
