= Killing of Gabby Petito =

2021 crime in Wyoming, US

Gabby Petito
- Petito in 2021
- Born: Gabrielle Venora Petito; March 19, 1999; Blue Point, New York, U.S.
- Died: c. August 27, 2021 (aged 22); Teton County, Wyoming, U.S.
- Cause of death: Blunt trauma and strangulation
- Body discovered: September 19, 2021; Bridger–Teton National Forest, Wyoming, U.S.
- Partner: Brian Laundrie (2019–2021)

In August 2021, Gabrielle Venora Petito, a 22-year-old American travelling vlogger, was killed by her fiancé, Brian Christopher Laundrie, while they were traveling together on a vanlife journey across the United States. The trip was planned to last for four months and began on July 2, 2021, but Petito disappeared on August 27.

After Petito's disappearance, Laundrie raised suspicion when he drove the van from Wyoming back to his parents' Florida home and refused to discuss her whereabouts. He was deemed a person of interest in the case, and an arrest warrant was issued on charges of his making unauthorized withdrawals using her debit card. He left his home on September 13 and was reported missing four days later.

On September 19, Petito's remains were found in Wyoming's Bridger–Teton National Forest. An autopsy found that she was killed by blunt-force injuries to her head and neck and manual strangulation. After a month of speculation around Laundrie's whereabouts, and an extended search of the area around his home, his skeletal remains were discovered in Florida's Myakkahatchee Creek Environmental Park on October 20. It was confirmed by an autopsy on November 23 that Laundrie had died from a self-inflicted gunshot wound to the head, and the FBI later announced that he had admitted to killing Petito in his notebook, which was found near his remains.

The case gained widespread attention due to the couple's documenting of their travels on social media, leaked police body camera footage, 9-1-1 emergency dispatch call recordings, eyewitness accounts, the actions of Laundrie's parents, and the extensive media coverage.

== Background ==
Gabrielle Venora Petito was born on March 19, 1999, in Blue Point, New York, and raised there. She had six younger siblings and half-siblings. In 2013, Petito and her step-brothers appeared in a music video to raise awareness about American gun violence in response to the Sandy Hook Elementary School shooting. In 2017, she graduated from Bayport-Blue Point High School in Bayport, New York, where she met Brian Christopher Laundrie (born on November 18, 1997, in Islip). From September 2017 to January 2019, she lived in Carolina Beach, North Carolina, working as a hostess and in the kitchen of a restaurant in nearby Wilmington. She applied to Cape Fear Community College, but did not attend.

Petito began dating Laundrie in March 2019, and moved in with him and his parents in North Port, Florida. The couple worked at a Publix in North Port, where she was a pharmacy technician and he worked in the grocery department. They quit their jobs at the onset of the COVID-19 pandemic.

In late 2019 and early 2020, the couple embarked on a cross-country drive from New York to California. They visited Las Vegas, Yosemite National Park, Pismo Beach, and other points of interest. In March 2020, Petito celebrated her 21st birthday in Nokomis, Florida. She and Laundrie visited Sope Creek, Georgia in June 2020, and the two were engaged the following month.

In December 2020, Petito purchased a 2012 Ford Transit Connect van converted into a camper, in which the couple would take their next cross-country trip. To save money for the trip, she worked 50-hour weeks at Taco Bell and as a nutritionist, while Laundrie took a job at an organic juice bar. Petito documented her life and travels on social media sites such as YouTube and Instagram, where she described her interests as "art, yoga, and veggies".

== Disappearance ==
=== Road trip ===
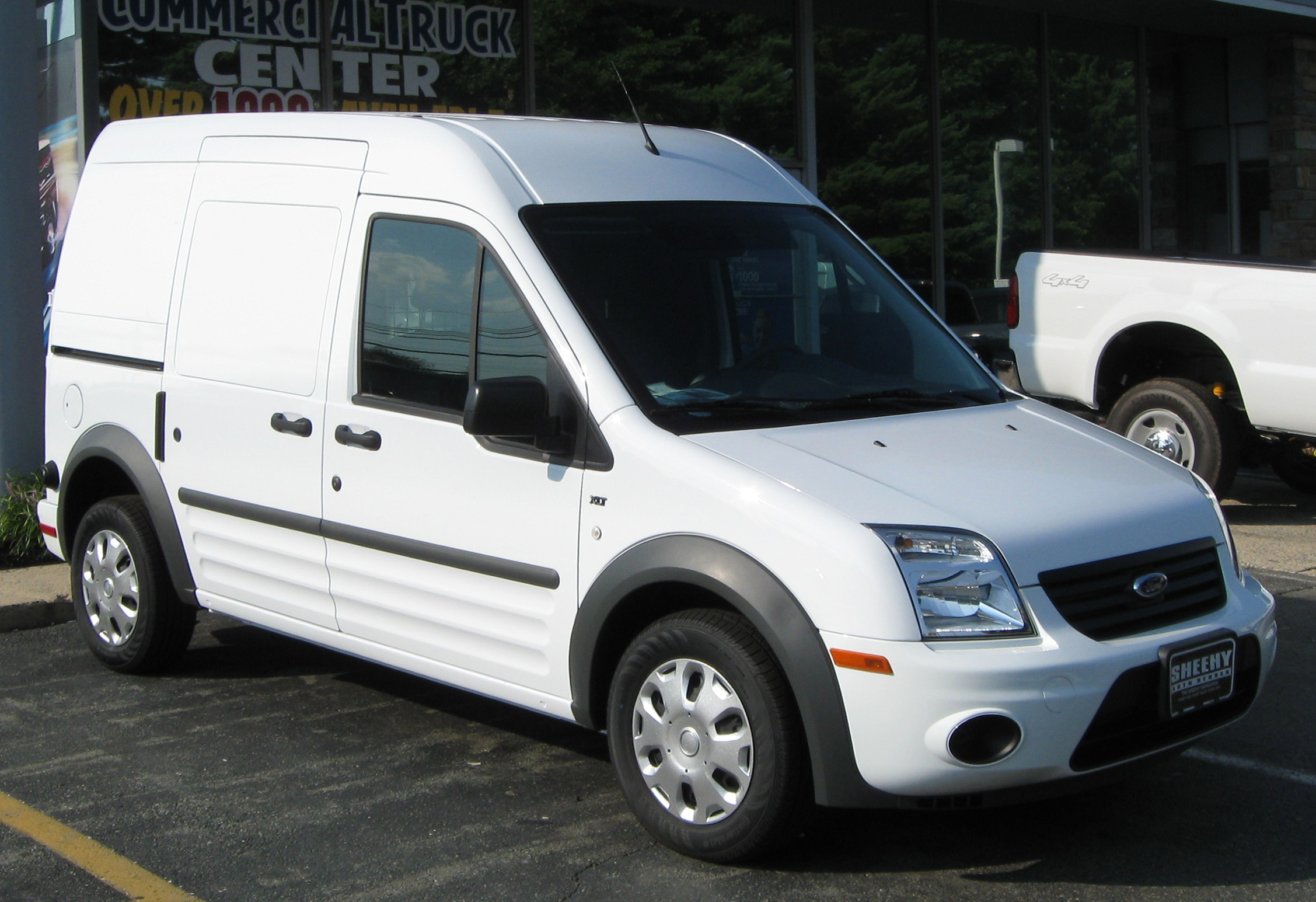
Laundrie and Petito traveled in a white 2012 Ford Transit Connect similar to the 2010 Ford Transit Connect XLT pictured above.

On June 17, 2021, Petito and Laundrie visited her native Blue Point for her brother's graduation ceremony. On July 2, they left Blue Point in the Ford Transit Connect van for their trip. Later that month, they visited Monument Rocks, Great Sand Dunes National Park and Preserve, Zion National Park, Bryce Canyon National Park, Mystic Hot Springs, and Canyonlands National Park.

=== Domestic disturbance incident ===
On August 12, 2021, a witness called 9-1-1 to report that a couple (later identified as Laundrie and Petito) were fighting in front of the Moonflower Community Cooperative in Moab, Utah. The caller said they saw a man slap a woman, after which the man and woman ran up and down the sidewalk, then the man hit the woman again before they drove off together. Another witness described the incident to police as looking like Petito and Laundrie were talking "aggressively" and that Petito "was punching him in the arm". The witness said it looked like Laundrie was trying to leave Petito behind and take her phone with him. Before they drove off together, she climbed into the driver's seat, moved over into the passenger's seat so he could drive, and asked him, "Why do you have to be so mean?"

Officers from the Moab City Police Department (MCPD) identified the van driving erratically near the entrance to Arches National Park and conducted a traffic stop. They found Petito sobbing in the passenger's seat, with police body camera footage showing that she then told officers:

Yeah, I don't know if some days, I have really bad OCD. I was just cleaning and straightening up, back in the... I was apologizing to him and saying, "I'm sorry that I'm so mean," because sometimes I have OCD and sometimes I can get really frustrated. Not like mean towards him. I just like, I just, my vibe is, I'm in a bad mood. And, I was just saying I'm sorry if I'm in a bad mood. I just... I had so much work I was doing on my computer this morning. And, I just now quit my job to travel across the country and I'm trying to start a blog. I have a blog. So I've been building my website. I've been really stressed and he doesn't really believe that I could do any of it, so, we've just been fighting all morning and he wouldn't let me in the car before.

Petito first downplayed the physical altercation; after the officer pointed out marks on her arm and face and told her to "just be honest", she said that Laundrie "kept telling [her] to shut up" and "grabbed [her] face" which had caused an injury.

Laundrie told the officer, "I said, 'Let's just take a breather and let's not go anywhere, and just calm down for a minute.' She was getting worked up. And then she had her phone and was trying to get the keys from me. I was just trying to [...] I know I shouldn't push her. I was just trying to push her away to go, 'Let's take a minute and step back and breathe and see.' She got me with her phone."

Petito told the officer that she hit Laundrie first, and asked the officers not to separate them. In his report, one of the officers wrote, "At no point in my investigation did Gabrielle stop crying, breathing heavily, or compose a sentence without needing to wipe away tears, wipe her nose, or rub her knees with her hands. The male tried to create distance by telling Gabby to take a walk to calm down. [...] She did not want to be separated from the male and began slapping him. He grabbed her face and pushed her back as she pressed upon him and the van."

Neither Petito nor Laundrie wanted to press charges as a result of the incident, which was characterized by police as a mental breakdown rather than domestic violence, which would have required an arrest. The police separated the couple, arranging for Laundrie to spend a night at the Bowen Motel in Moab, and for Petito to stay in the van.

The MCPD later investigated whether or not its officers handled the case in accordance with the department's policies, and its chief of police took a leave of absence during the investigation.

=== Last reported activities and sightings ===
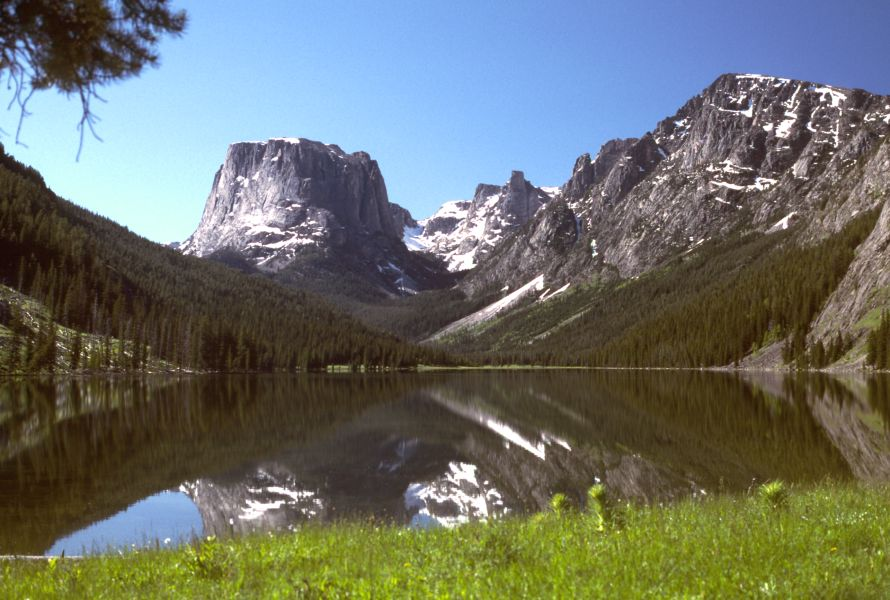
Bridger–Teton National Forest in Wyoming

On August 17, Laundrie took a flight from Salt Lake City to Tampa, Florida, leaving Petito behind. Petito spent several days at a Fairfield Inn and Suites hotel near Salt Lake City International Airport, according to staff, and checked out on August 24. It was later explained by the Laundrie family attorney that he made the trip to "obtain some items and empty and close the storage unit to save money as they contemplated extending the road trip". Laundrie returned on August 23 to rejoin Petito and continue the trip.

Petito's mother said that she last spoke to her daughter on August 25 and had been told that the couple were traveling from Utah to Grand Teton and Yellowstone national parks. On August 25, the final post was made on Petito's Instagram account, which consisted of photos of herself taken in front of a butterfly mural outside a restaurant in Ogden, Utah.

A witness said that, on August 27 between 1 p.m. and 2 p.m. she saw Laundrie and Petito together at the Merry Piglets Tex-Mex restaurant in Jackson Hole, Wyoming. Per the witness, Laundrie was "aggressive" and had an argument (apparently regarding money) with the manager, waitress, and hostess. The witness said she later saw Petito return to the restaurant, crying and apologizing for Laundrie's behavior. Restaurant staff confirmed via Instagram that the couple were indeed there.

Shortly afterwards, Petito and Laundrie were filmed by CCTV at a Whole Foods store in Jackson, Wyoming. They arrived at the parking lot at 2:11 p.m. and entered the store at 2:14 p.m. before exiting at 2:30 p.m. and heading back into the van. After about 20 minutes of sitting in the van, they eventually drove away and joined Highway 89, the road north to Bridger–Teton National Forest campsite at 2:56 p.m. This is the last footage of Petito alive. Also on August 27, a text from Petito's phone was sent to her mother which read, "Can you help Stan, I just keep getting his voicemails and missed calls." The message raised concerns for Petito's mother, who said that Stan was Petito's grandfather and that she never referred to him by his first name.

There were no known further sightings of Petito before her death. Eyewitness accounts suggest that Laundrie left the van near the Spread Creek Dispersed Camping area of the Bridger–Teton National Forest – close to where Petito's body was later discovered – and traveled alone on foot, before returning on August 29:

- A witness encountered the van without any occupants or signs of camping near Spread Creek on August 27 and possibly 28. They had previously seen a "generic" young white man, believed to be Laundrie, driving his van slowly and "acting weird" in the same area on August 26. They posted a video on TikTok detailing their observations. According to the witness, an FBI agent said that their account "tipped [the FBI] off" to the correct location of Petito's remains.
- The operators of a YouTube channel posted dashcam footage they captured on August 27, showing a white van matching the description of Laundrie and Petito's Ford Transit in the same area. One of the witnesses said they saw the van around 6:00 pm, and once more when they returned to the area later that night.
- A woman said in a TikTok video that on August 29, she and her boyfriend gave Laundrie a lift from an area near Colter Bay Village after seeing him hitchhiking alone. She reported that Laundrie "freaked out" upon learning that they were going to Jackson Hole instead of Jackson, Wyoming, disembarking the vehicle at 6:09 p.m. near the Jackson Lake Dam less than 30 minutes and 10 mi (16 km) after being picked up. The witness found it "weird" that Laundrie offered $200 for the ride and did not appear to be very dirty, despite alleging that he had been camping for days.
- Another witness stated that she picked up Laundrie from the Jackson Lake Dam area at 6:20 or 6:30 p.m. on August 29, dropping him off at the entrance to the Spread Creek Dispersed Camping area. Laundrie offered gas money for the 20 minute ride, but did not want to be taken further than the entrance of the campground, which was several miles from the van. According to the witness, Laundrie acted "antsy" about getting out of the vehicle as it got closer to the campsite.

According to Laundrie's parents, on August 29, Laundrie called his mother, and as their conversation was brought to the end, his tone "completely changed". After that, Laundrie's father contacted him back, and Laundrie told him that "Gabby's gone" and that he may need a lawyer, without giving further details.

The last text message from Petito's phone to her mother, sent on August 30, simply said "no service in Yosemite". Her mother did not believe this message was sent by Petito. Text messages were also sent between Laundrie and Petito's phones, and a transaction of $700 was made from Petito's account to Laundrie with a message saying "goodbye" to him; these activities are believed to have been conducted by Laundrie in an attempt to create an alibi.

On September 1, Laundrie returned alone to his parents' North Port home in the Ford Transit Connect. On September 6 and 7, he and his parents went camping at Fort De Soto Park in Pinellas County.

== Investigation ==
=== Petito and Laundrie reported missing ===
On September 11, after not hearing from Petito since late August, Petito's mother filed a missing person report. Four days later, Laundrie was named a person of interest. His parents hired a lawyer and, based on his advice, remained silent and refused to talk to anyone about the case.

Police surveilled the Laundrie home and saw him leave on September 13. Two days later, they saw his car return; police believed the person who exited the car and entered the home was Laundrie. The following day, North Port police chief Todd Garrison told reporters, "All I'm going to say is we know where Brian Laundrie is at." On September 17, Laundrie was reported missing by his parents, who alleged not to have seen him since September 13. It was at this time that police realized that they had mistaken Laundrie's mother for Laundrie himself on September 15.

After obtaining search warrants, police seized the Ford Transit Connect, an external hard drive, and the Laundrie family's Ford Mustang from the North Port residence.

=== Discovery of Petito's remains ===
On September 19, human remains matching the description of Petito were found at the Spread Creek Dispersed Camping area in Wyoming, not far from where the Ford Transit Connect had previously been observed. Her identity was confirmed, and an autopsy determined that the manner of death was homicide by "blunt-force injuries to the head and neck, with manual strangulation", which occurred three to four weeks before the body was found.

=== Search for Laundrie and discovery of remains ===
Brian Laundrie

On September 23, the United States District Court for the District of Wyoming issued an arrest warrant for Laundrie due to his unauthorized use of Petito's debit card to obtain $1,000 or more between August 30 and September 1. The FBI took material to match Laundrie's DNA from his home.

On October 5, in an interview with ABC News, Laundrie's sister encouraged him to surrender to authorities. Two days later, Laundrie's father joined investigators in searching for him at the T. Mabry Carlton Reserve in Sarasota County, Florida, focusing on areas he used to frequent in the reserve and the adjacent Myakkahatchee Creek Environmental Park.

On October 20, Laundrie's skeletal remains (identified by forensic dentistry) and some of his belongings were found in the Myakkahatchee Creek Environmental Park, in an area that had recently been underwater due to flooding. His cause of death could not be determined by an autopsy, and his remains were given to a forensic anthropologist for further examination. On November 23, it was announced that the anthropologist had concluded that Laundrie died of a self-inflicted gunshot wound to the head.

=== Laundrie's admission ===
On January 21, 2022, the FBI revealed that Laundrie's notebook, which was found near his remains, contained an entry in which he admitted to killing Petito and deceiving people by sending text messages that made it appear she was still alive. He was officially blamed for Petito's death by authorities, and the investigation was closed.

In June 2022, the Laundrie family's lawyer released the full notebook entry, in which Laundrie alleged that he killed Petito after she had fallen into water and injured herself: "I ended her life. I thought it was merciful, that it is what she wanted, but now I see all the mistake [sic] I made." The note ends with his plans for suicide: "I am ending my life not because of a fear of punishment but rather because I can't stand to live another day without her." Experts, however, contend that Laundrie's account does not match investigators' findings. Michael Alcazar of the John Jay College of Criminal Justice believed Laundrie was "someone who doesn't want to own up to what he did" and was "trying to find justification for the actions he did".

== Public interest ==
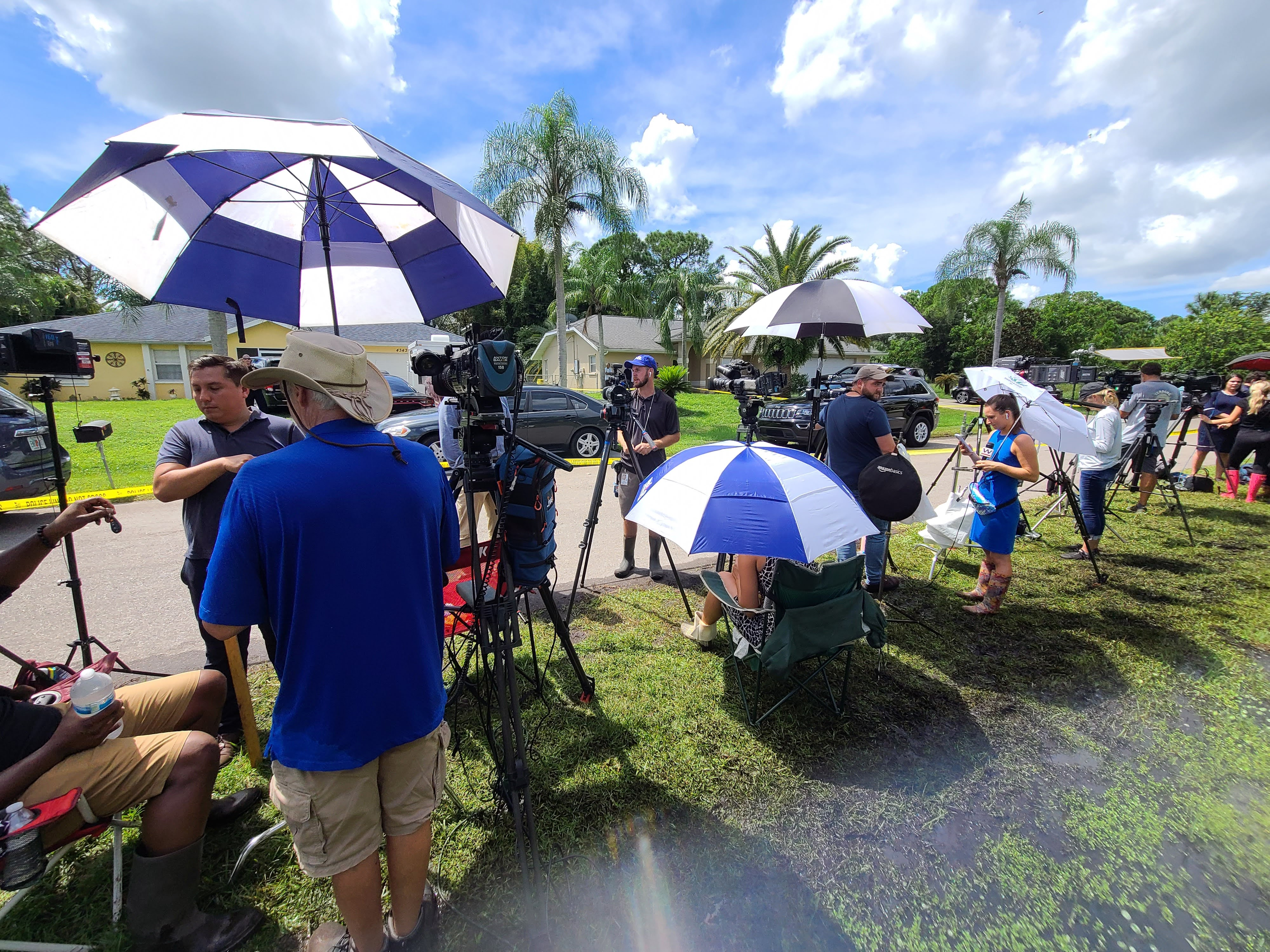
Media outside the Laundrie family home in North Port, Florida, on September 20, 2021

The case sparked more public interest and coverage on news and social media than other missing persons and murder cases. This heightened interest was attributed to several factors, such as the refusal by Laundrie and his parents to comment on Petito's whereabouts, the amount of content on social media documenting the couple's lifestyle, the video footage of the Utah traffic stop, the audio recording of the 9-1-1 call, the video posts by witnesses which provided a lot of publicly available evidence, the idea that those involved were a young and attractive couple in a romantic getaway gone wrong, the domestic violence incidents in their relationship, an increased interest in cross-country van-dwelling trips due to the COVID-19 pandemic, and the general increased interest in true crime-related entertainment in the decade leading up to Petito's murder.

There was speculation that the case was linked to the murders of Kylen Schulte and Crystal Turner, which occurred in Moab around the same time Laundrie and Petito were there. Law enforcement ruled out any connection between the two cases by September 17.

Public involvement in the case included witnesses and others posting their observations and theories on social media, protestors demanding answers outside the Laundrie home, a candlelight vigil for Petito in her hometown, and donations to the Gabby Petito Foundation established by her parents to support searches for other missing persons. The increased interest in the search for Laundrie and Petito led to the discovery of five bodies of other missing persons. While some posts on social media regarding the case were helpful in the investigation, many of them have been characterized as insensitive, unhelpful, motivated by potentially increased exposure or financial reward, or outright misinformation.

The high volume of media coverage of the case was cited by some commentators as an example of missing white woman syndrome, a term used to describe the news media's disproportionate focus on missing person cases involving young, attractive, white, upper-middle-class women or girls, while cases involving individuals who do not fit that description receive significantly less attention. Several outlets compared Petito's case to the approximately 710 indigenous people reported missing in or near the same location between 2011 and 2020, highlighting the stark disparity in media coverage. Joseph Petito, Gabby Petito's father, initially expressed discomfort with the term but later recognized the disparities it underscores. He has since used his platform to advocate for greater attention to missing persons cases involving marginalized groups, notably through projects like the television series Faces of the Missing and the Gabby Petito Foundation.

== Lawsuits ==
On November 17, 2022, a wrongful death claim brought by Petito's estate against Laundrie's estate resulted in an award of $3 million. The recovery of this amount was doubtful due to Laundrie's minimal assets.

Petito's parents sued Laundrie's parents and their attorney Steve Bertolino, claiming pain and emotional distress because Laundrie's parents and their attorney withheld information regarding Petito's death. This lawsuit was settled after mediation on February 21, 2024; terms were not disclosed.

In November 2022, Petito's parents filed a $50 million wrongful death lawsuit against the Moab police department. They amended the complaint in 2023 to include allegations that officer Eric Pratt admitted that he was aware Laundrie was a threat but decided to ignore the law, and that the department did not abide by its own Lethality Assessment Protocol. On November 20, 2024, the judge dismissed the lawsuit, citing the Governmental Immunity Act of Utah which provides for sovereign immunity, though he acknowledged the case met the early standard to suggest the officers' conduct could have contributed to her death. The parents appealed the dismissal to the Utah Supreme Court.

== In popular media ==
On October 1, 2022, Lifetime released a TV movie called The Gabby Petito Story as part of its Ripped from the Headlines series. Directed by Thora Birch, the film stars Skyler Samuels as Petito, Evan Hall as Laundrie, and Birch as Petito's mother.

A Netflix docuseries about the case, American Murder: Gabby Petito was released on February 17, 2025.

== See also ==
- List of solved missing person cases (2020s)
