= Who Killed Malcolm X? =

- Directed by: Rachel Dretzin; Phil Bertelsen
- Starring: Abdur-Rahman Muhammad
- Country of origin: United States
- Original language: English

Production
- Producer: Fusion
- Running time: 43 minutes

Original release
- Network: Netflix
- Release: February 7, 2020

Who Killed Malcolm X? is a 2020 documentary miniseries directed by Rachel Dretzin and Phil Bertelsen. Originally produced for Fusion TV, the series began streaming on Netflix on February 7, 2020.

The documentary follows the work of Abdur-Rahman Muhammad, a historian and tour guide in Washington, D.C., who for more than 30 years has been investigating the assassination of Malcolm X. The documentary investigates the allegations made in the 1977 Hayer affidavits. In the affidavits Talmadge Hayer, a convicted assassin of Malcolm X, stated that the two men convicted alongside him were innocent, and that his four co-conspirators were Benjamin Thomas, Leon Davis, William X, and a man by the name of Wilbur or Kinly, all from the Nation of Islam mosque in Newark.

Following the release of the miniseries, the Manhattan district attorney announced that the district attorney's office would begin a preliminary review of the investigation into Malcolm X's murder in order to decide whether the case should be reopened. On November 17, 2021, Manhattan district attorney announced that convictions of Muhammad A. Aziz and Khalil Islam, who both served 20 years in prison for the murder of Malcolm X, would be thrown out. In November 2022, Aziz and Islam were awarded a combined total of $26 million by New York City and a further $10 million from the state.

== Episodes ==
- Episode 1 – Marked Man
- Episode 2 – Straight Man in a Crooked Game
- Episode 3 – Black Messiah
- Episode 4 – Showdown
- Episode 5 – Shotgun Man
- Episode 6 – Legacies
