= Assassination of Malcolm X =

1965 murder in New York City, U.S.

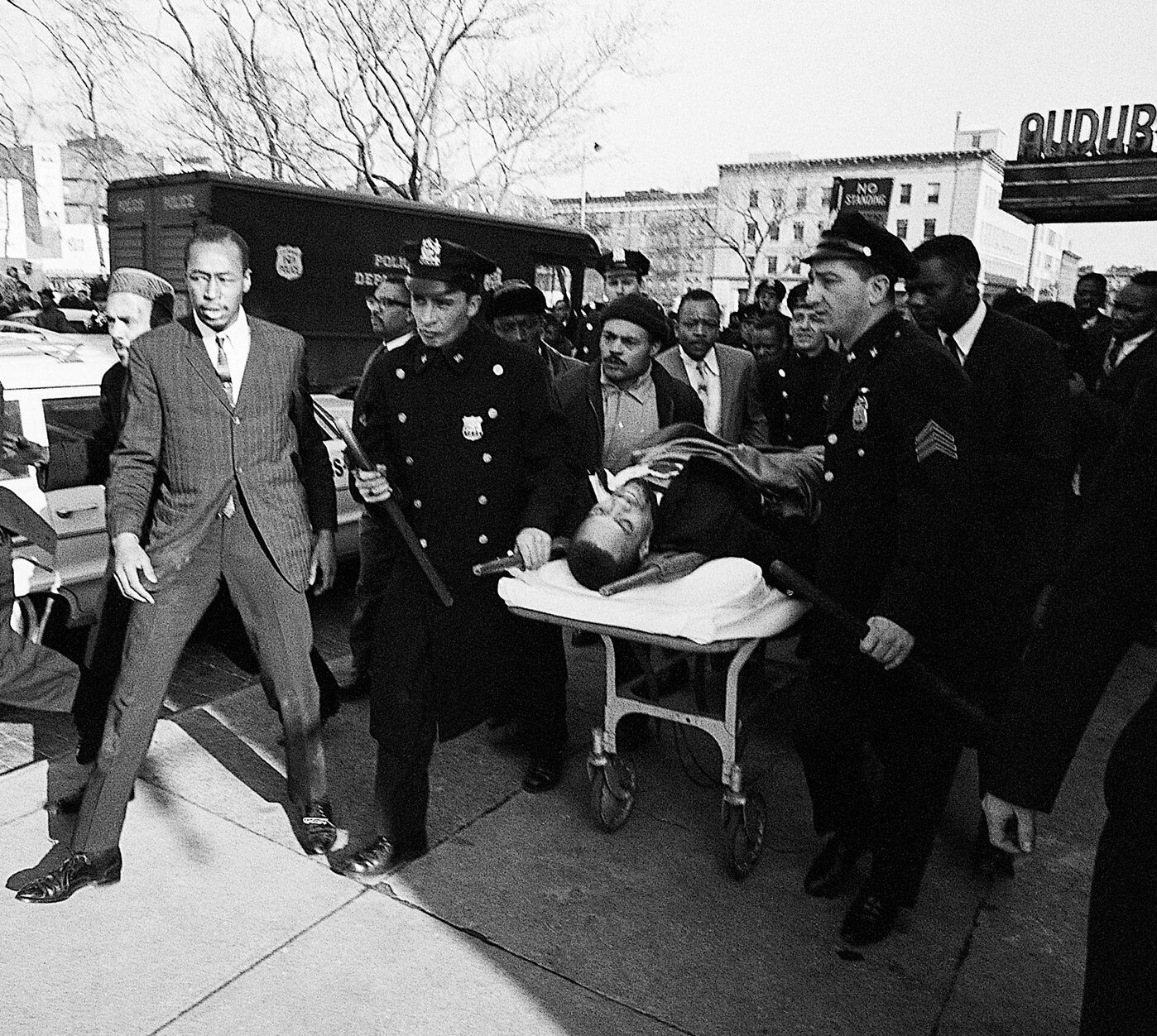
- Malcolm X being taken away from the Audubon Ballroom on a stretcher after the shooting
- Location: Manhattan, New York City, U.S.
- Date: February 21, 1965; 61 years ago c. 3:10 p.m. (EST)
- Target: Malcolm X
- Attack type: Assassination, murder by shooting
- Weapons: Sawed-off shotgun 2 semi-automatic pistols
- Victim: Malcolm X
- Perpetrator: Thomas Hagan
- Motive: Retribution for Malcolm X's departure from the Nation of Islam and his criticism of leader Elijah Muhammad
- Verdict: All guilty (Aziz and Islam's convictions overturned in 2021)
- Convictions: Second-degree murder
- Sentence: Life in prison with the possibility of parole after 20 years
- Convicted: Muhammad Abdul Aziz (exonerated); Khalil Islam (posthumously exonerated); Thomas Hagan

On February 21, 1965, Malcolm X, a Muslim African American minister and Black power activist who was a popular figure during the civil rights movement, was shot multiple times and died from his wounds in Manhattan, New York City, at the age of 39 while preparing to address the Organization of Afro-American Unity at the Audubon Ballroom in the neighborhood of Washington Heights. Three members of the Nation of Islam—Muhammad Abdul Aziz, Khalil Islam, and Thomas Hagan—were charged, tried, and convicted of the murder and given indeterminate life sentences. In April 2010, Hagan was released from prison, and in November 2021, Aziz and Islam were exonerated.

Speculation about the assassination and whether it was conceived or aided by leading or additional members of the Nation of Islam, or by law enforcement agencies, particularly the FBI and CIA, has persisted for decades after the shooting. The assassination was one of four major assassinations of the 1960s in the United States, coming less than two years after the assassination of John F. Kennedy in 1963, and three years before the assassinations of Martin Luther King Jr. and Robert F. Kennedy in 1968.

== Death threats and intimidation from Nation of Islam ==
Throughout 1964, Malcolm X's conflict with the Nation of Islam (NOI) intensified, and he was repeatedly threatened. Malcolm X fell out with the NOI and the group's leader, Elijah Muhammad, after Malcolm X made provocative remarks about the assassination of John F. Kennedy and condemned Muhammad's sexual relationships with several underage girls. Malcolm X publicly announced his departure from the NOI in March 1964.

In February, a leader of Temple Number Seven ordered the bombing of Malcolm X's car. In March, Elijah Muhammad told Boston minister Louis X (later known as Louis Farrakhan) that "hypocrites like Malcolm should have their heads cut off"; the April 10 edition of Muhammad Speaks featured a cartoon depicting Malcolm X's bouncing, severed head.

On June 8, FBI surveillance recorded a telephone call in which Betty Shabazz was told that her husband was "as good as dead". Four days later, an FBI informant received a tip that "Malcolm X is going to be bumped off." That same month, the Nation sued to reclaim Malcolm X's residence in East Elmhurst, Queens, New York. His family was ordered to vacate but on February 14, 1965‍—‌the night before a hearing on postponing the eviction‍—‌the house was destroyed by fire.

On July 9, Muhammad aide John Ali (suspected of being an undercover FBI agent) referred to Malcolm X by saying, "Anyone who opposes the Honorable Elijah Muhammad puts their life in jeopardy." In the December 4 issue of Muhammad Speaks, Louis X wrote that "such a man as Malcolm is worthy of death."

The September 1964 issue of Ebony dramatized Malcolm X's defiance of these threats by publishing a photograph of him holding an M1 carbine while peering out of a window.

External image
- "The Violent End of the Man Called Malcolm", LIFE, March 5, 1965. Photos taken moments after the fatal shots were fired, including one of activist Yuri Kochiyama cradling the dying Malcolm X's head.

On February 18, 1965, Malcolm X relayed in an interview that he was a "marked man", referring to his severed ties with the Nation and how it would ultimately be the reason for his demise. He went on to say that, "No one can get out without trouble, and this thing with me will be resolved by death and violence."

On February 19, Malcolm X told interviewer Gordon Parks that the Nation of Islam was actively trying to kill him.

== Assassination ==
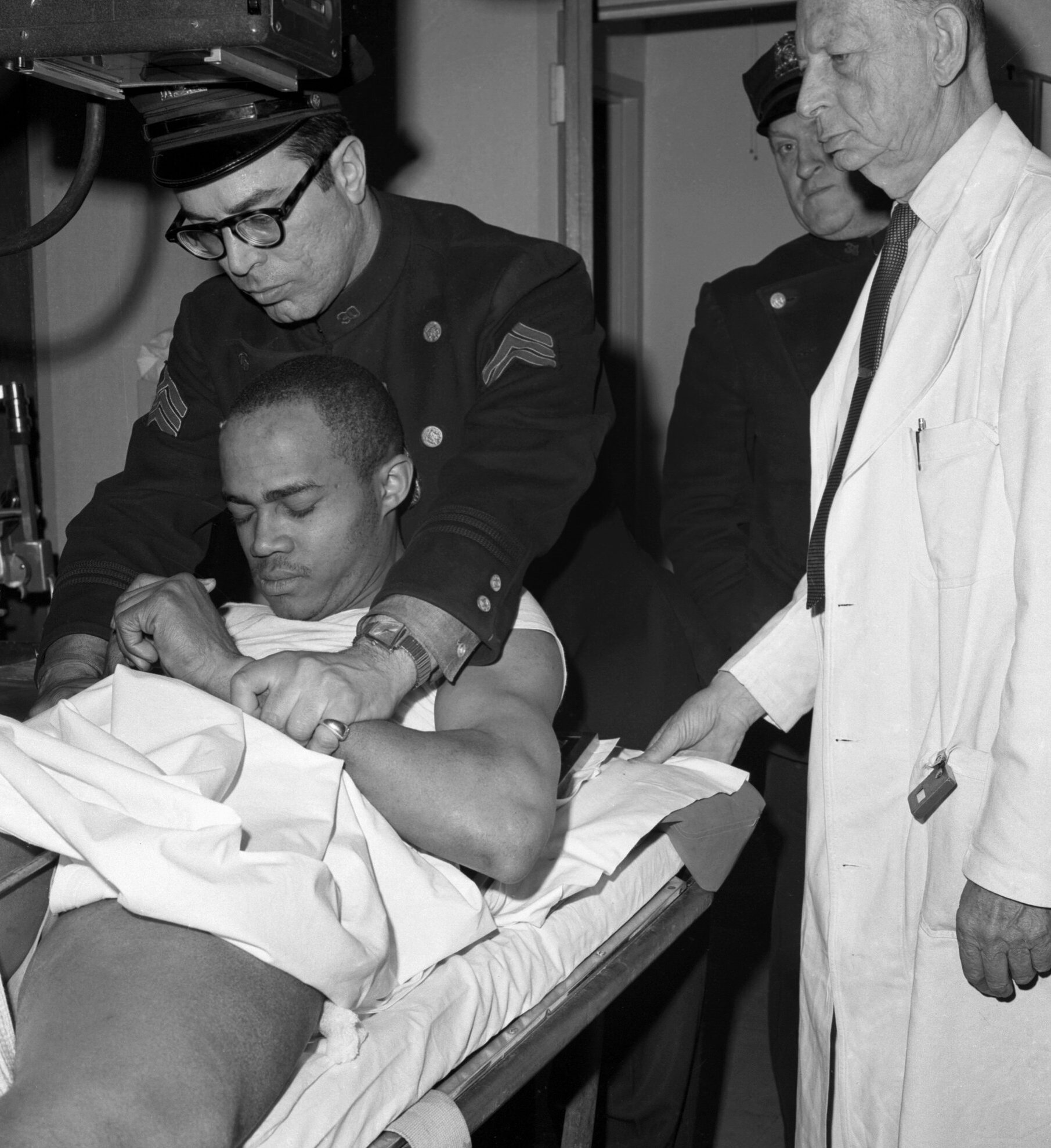
Assassin Thomas Hagan being restrained by a police officer at the hospital where he was taken after the killing.

On February 21, 1965, Malcolm X was preparing to address the Organization of Afro-American Unity in Manhattan's Audubon Ballroom when someone in the 400-person audience yelled, "Nigger! Get your hand outta my pocket!" As Malcolm X and his bodyguards tried to quell the disturbance, (Note: In his epilogue to The Autobiography of Malcolm X, Haley wrote that Malcolm X said, "Hold it! Hold it! Don't get excited. Let's cool it, brothers" (p. 499). According to a transcript of an audio recording, Malcolm's only words were, "Hold it!", repeated 10 times (DeCaro, p. 274).) a man rushed forward and shot him once in the chest with a sawed-off shotgun and two other men charged the stage firing semi-automatic handguns. Malcolm X was pronounced dead at 3:30 pm, shortly after arriving at Columbia Presbyterian Hospital. The autopsy identified 21 gunshot wounds to the chest, left shoulder, arms and legs, including 10 buckshot wounds from the initial shotgun blast.

Les Payne and Tamara Payne, in their Pulitzer Prize–winning biography The Dead Are Arising: The Life of Malcolm X, claim that the assassins were members of the Nation of Islam's Newark, New Jersey, mosque: William 25X (also known as William Bradley), who fired the shotgun; Leon Davis; and Thomas Hagan (then known as Talmadge X Hayer).

One gunman, Nation of Islam member Talmadge Hayer, was beaten by the crowd before police arrived. Witnesses identified the other gunmen as Nation members Norman 3X Butler and Thomas 15X Johnson. All three were convicted of murder in March 1966 and sentenced to life in prison. At trial Hayer confessed, but refused to identify the other assailants except to assert that they were not Butler and Johnson. In 1977 and 1978, he signed affidavits reasserting Butler's and Johnson's innocence, naming four other Nation members of Newark's Mosque No. 25 as participants in the murder or its planning. These affidavits did not result in the case being reopened. In 2020, the Netflix docuseries Who Killed Malcolm X? explored the assassination, which launched a new review of the murder by the office of the Manhattan District Attorney.

On November 18, 2021, Manhattan District Attorney Cyrus Vance Jr. exonerated Butler, now known as Muhammad Abdul Aziz, and Johnson, now known as Khalil Islam, of the crime. Aziz was paroled in 1985 and became the head of the Nation's Harlem mosque in 1998; he maintains his innocence. In prison, Islam rejected the Nation's teachings and converted to Sunni Islam. Released in 1987, he maintained his innocence until his death in August 2009. Hayer, who also rejected the Nation's teachings while in prison and converted to Sunni Islam, is known today as Mujahid Halim. He was paroled in 2010.

A CNN Special Report, Witnessed: The Assassination of Malcolm X, was broadcast on February 17, 2015. It featured interviews with several people who worked with him, including A. Peter Bailey and Earl Grant, as well as the daughter of Malcolm X, Ilyasah Shabazz.

=== Funeral ===
The public viewing, on February 23–26 at Unity Funeral Home in Harlem, was attended by some 14,000 to 30,000 mourners. For the funeral on February 27, loudspeakers were set up for the overflow crowd outside Harlem's thousand-seat Faith Temple of the Church of God in Christ, and a local television station carried the service live.

Among the civil rights leaders attending were John Lewis, Bayard Rustin, James Forman, James Farmer, Jesse Gray, and Andrew Young. Actor and activist Ossie Davis delivered the eulogy, describing Malcolm X as "our shining black prince ... who didn't hesitate to die because he loved us so":

There are those who will consider it their duty, as friends of the Negro people, to tell us to revile him, to flee, even from the presence of his memory, to save ourselves by writing him out of the history of our turbulent times. Many will ask what Harlem finds to honor in this stormy, controversial and bold young captain‍—‌and we will smile. Many will say turn away‍—‌away from this man, for he is not a man but a demon, a monster, a subverter and an enemy of the black man‍—‌and we will smile. They will say that he is of hate‍—‌a fanatic, a racist‍—‌who can only bring evil to the cause for which you struggle! And we will answer and say to them: Did you ever talk to Brother Malcolm? Did you ever touch him, or have him smile at you? Did you ever really listen to him? Did he ever do a mean thing? Was he ever himself associated with violence or any public disturbance? For if you did you would know him. And if you knew him you would know why we must honor him.… And, in honoring him, we honor the best in ourselves.

Malcolm X was buried at Ferncliff Cemetery in Hartsdale, New York. Friends took up the gravediggers' shovels to complete the burial themselves.

Actor and activist Ruby Dee and Juanita Poitier (wife of Sidney Poitier) established the Committee of Concerned Mothers to raise money for a home for his family and for his children's educations.

=== Reactions ===
Reactions to Malcolm X's assassination were varied. In a telegram to Betty Shabazz, Martin Luther King Jr. expressed his sadness at "the shocking and tragic assassination of your husband." He said:

While we did not always see eye to eye on methods to solve the race problem, I always had a deep affection for Malcolm and felt that he had a great ability to put his finger on the existence and root of the problem. He was an eloquent spokesman for his point of view and no one can honestly doubt that Malcolm had a great concern for the problems that we face as a race.

Elijah Muhammad told the annual Savior's Day convention on February 26 that "Malcolm X got just what he preached," but denied any involvement with the murder. "We didn't want to kill Malcolm and didn't try to kill him," Muhammad said, adding "We know such ignorant, foolish teachings would bring him to his own end."

Writer James Baldwin, who had been a friend of Malcolm X, was in London when he heard the news of the assassination. He responded with indignation towards the reporters interviewing him, shouting, "You did it! It is because of you—the men that created this white supremacy—that this man is dead. You are not guilty, but you did it.… Your mills, your cities, your rape of a continent started all this."

The New York Post wrote that "even his sharpest critics recognized his brilliance‍—‌often wild, unpredictable and eccentric, but nevertheless possessing promise that must now remain unrealized." The New York Times wrote that Malcolm X was "an extraordinary and twisted man" who "turn[ed] many true gifts to evil purpose" and that his life was "strangely and pitifully wasted." Time called him "an unashamed demagogue" whose "creed was violence."

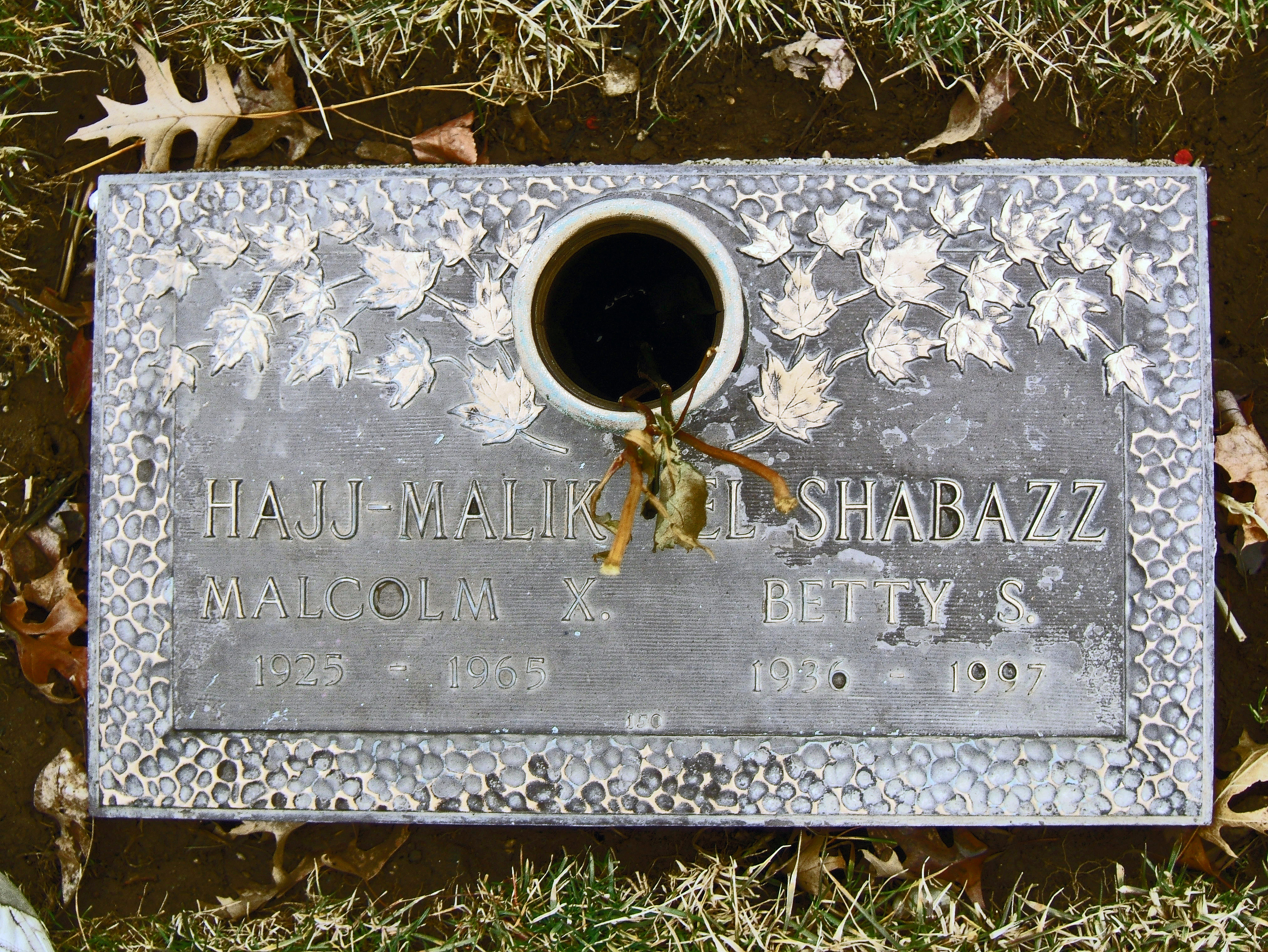
Grave site of Malcolm X

Outside the U.S., particularly in Africa, the press was sympathetic. The Daily Times of Nigeria wrote that Malcolm X would "have a place in the palace of martyrs". The Ghanaian Times likened him to John Brown, Medgar Evers and Patrice Lumumba, and counted him among "a host of Africans and Americans who were martyred in freedom's cause." In China, the People's Daily described Malcolm X as a martyr killed by "ruling circles and racists" in the United States; his assassination, the paper wrote, demonstrated that "in dealing with imperialist oppressors, violence must be met with violence." The Guangming Daily, also published in Beijing, stated that "Malcolm was murdered because he fought for freedom and equal rights." In Cuba, El Mundo described the assassination as "another racist crime to eradicate by violence the struggle against discrimination."

In a weekly column he wrote for the New York Amsterdam News, King reflected on Malcolm X and his assassination:

Malcolm X came to the fore as a public figure partially as a result of a TV documentary entitled, The Hate that Hate Produced. That title points to the nature of Malcolm's life and death.

Malcolm X was clearly a product of the hate and violence invested in the Negro's blighted existence in this nation....

In his youth, there was no hope, no preaching, teaching or movements of non-violence....

It is a testimony to Malcolm's personal depth and integrity that he could not become an underworld Czar, but turned again and again to religion for meaning and destiny. Malcolm was still turning and growing at the time of his brutal and meaningless assassination....

Like the murder of Lumumba, the murder of Malcolm X deprives the world of a potentially great leader. I could not agree with either of these men, but I could see in them a capacity for leadership which I could respect, and which was just beginning to mature in judgment and statesmanship.

=== Allegations of conspiracy ===
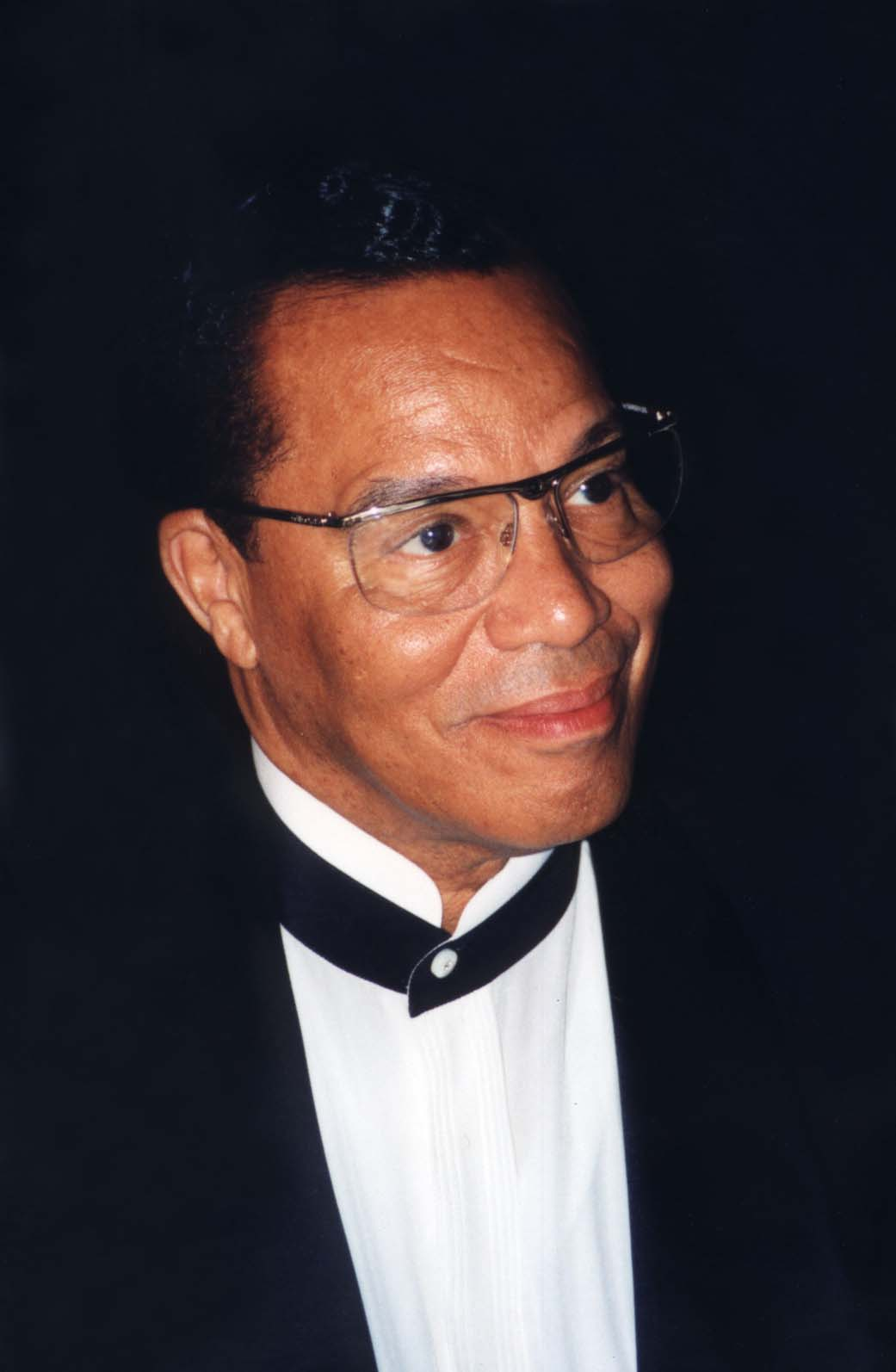
Louis Farrakhan in 1997

Within days, the question of who bore responsibility for the assassination was being publicly debated. On February 23, James Farmer, leader of the Congress of Racial Equality, announced at a news conference that local drug dealers, and not the Nation of Islam, were to blame. Others accused the NYPD, the FBI, or the CIA, citing the lack of police protection, the ease with which the assassins entered the Audubon Ballroom, and the failure of the police to preserve the crime scene. Earl Grant, one of Malcolm X's associates who was present at the assassination, later wrote:

[A]bout five minutes later, a most incredible scene took place. Into the hall sauntered about a dozen policemen. They were strolling at about the pace one would expect of them if they were patrolling a quiet park. They did not seem to be at all excited or concerned about the circumstances.

I could hardly believe my eyes. Here were New York City policemen, entering a room from which at least a dozen shots had been heard, and yet not one of them had his gun out! As a matter of absolute fact, some of them even had their hands in their pockets.

In the 1970s, the public learned about COINTELPRO and other secret FBI programs established to infiltrate and disrupt civil rights organizations during the 1950s and 1960s. Louis Lomax wrote that John Ali, national secretary of the Nation of Islam, was a former FBI agent. Ali, however, had denied in an interview that he had ever worked for the FBI, instead stating he was only interviewed. Malcolm X had confided to a reporter that Ali exacerbated tensions between him and Elijah Muhammad, and that he considered Ali his "archenemy" within the Nation of Islam leadership. Ali had a meeting with Talmadge Hayer, one of the men convicted of killing Malcolm X, the night before the assassination.

The Shabazz family are among those who have accused Louis Farrakhan of involvement in Malcolm X's assassination. For many years, Betty Shabazz, the widow of Malcolm X, harbored resentment toward the Nation of Islam—and Farrakhan in particular—for what she felt was their role in the assassination of her husband. In a 1993 speech, Farrakhan seemed to confirm that the Nation of Islam was responsible for the assassination:

We don't give a damn about no white man law if you attack what we love. And frankly, it ain't none of your business. What do you got to say about it? Did you teach Malcolm? Did you make Malcolm? Did you clean up Malcolm? Did you put Malcolm out before the world? Was Malcolm your traitor or ours? And if we dealt with him like a nation deals with a traitor, what the hell business is it of yours? You just shut your mouth, and stay out of it. Because in the future, we gonna become a nation. And a nation gotta be able to deal with traitors and cutthroats and turncoats. The white man deals with his. The Jews deal with theirs.

During a 1994 interview, Gabe Pressman asked Shabazz whether Farrakhan "had anything to do" with Malcolm X's death. She replied: "Of course, yes. Nobody kept it a secret. It was a badge of honor. Everybody talked about it, yes."

In a 60 Minutes interview that aired during May 2000, Farrakhan stated that some of the things he said may have led to the assassination of Malcolm X. "I may have been complicit in words that I spoke", he said. "I acknowledge that and regret that any word that I have said caused the loss of life of a human being." A few days later Farrakhan denied that he "ordered the assassination" of Malcolm X, although he again acknowledged that he "created the atmosphere that ultimately led to Malcolm X's assassination."

No consensus has been reached on who was responsible for the assassination. In August 2014, an online petition was started using the White House online petition mechanism to call on the government to release, without alteration, any files it still held relating to the murder of Malcolm X. In January 2019, members of the families of Malcolm X, Martin Luther King Jr., and the Kennedy family were among dozens of Americans who signed a public statement calling for a truth and reconciliation commission to persuade Congress or the Justice Department to review the assassinations of all four leaders during the 1960s. On February 21, 2021, the family of deceased NYPD detective Raymond Wood, alongside three of Malcolm X's daughters, released a letter purportedly written by Wood which claimed NYPD and FBI involvement in the assassination; however, others claim the letter was falsified by Wood's cousin.

== Lawsuit in federal district court ==
On November 15, 2024, the family of Malcolm X filed a civil lawsuit in Manhattan's federal district court claiming that the New York Police Department, the CIA, and the FBI played a role in his killing, and seeking $100,000,000 in compensatory damages. The suit claims that the agencies knew about the assassination plot but failed to intervene, and exposed him further by arresting his bodyguards and intentionally removing officers from the ballroom before he was shot. The suit also claims that, after the assassination, the agencies fraudulently concealed information from his family and hamstrung efforts to identify his killers.

== Portrayals in popular culture ==
In an episode of the 1979 American mini-television series Roots: The Next Generations, there is a scene depicting the assassination.

The assassination has been portrayed in various media, including the 1981 television film, Death of a Prophet, and the 1992 motion picture Malcolm X.

Death of a Prophet, starring Morgan Freeman as Malcolm X, was primarily focused on the assassination. The Pittsburgh Post-Gazette said that the film "will stimulate discussion, but it won't shed any light on the [assassination] itself... To say Death of a Prophet takes liberties with the facts is an understatement, but the degree to which it does can be a bit irritating at times... Still, the film manages to capture an essential truth—Malcolm X was perceived in some circles and our government as a dangerous man because of his eloquence, self-discipline and unswerving dedication to black liberation."

Malcolm X, starring Denzel Washington, portrayed the assassination as having been conducted by members of the Nation of Islam, going with Hayer's testimony of who was there, with Giancarlo Esposito, Wendell Pierce, Leonard L. Thomas, Leland Gantt, and Michael Guess portraying the assassins. Producer Marvin Worth had acquired the rights to The Autobiography of Malcolm X in 1967, but the production had difficulties telling the entire story, in part due to unresolved questions surrounding the assassination. In 1971, Worth made a well-received documentary, Malcolm X, which received an Academy Award nomination in that category.

Who Killed Malcolm X?, a 2020 Netflix docuseries on the event, led to a review of the murder by the office of the Manhattan District Attorney.

The 2001 biographical film Ali, starring Will Smith as Muhammad Ali, depicts the assassination of Malcolm X, who is portrayed by American actor Mario Van Peebles.

The historical crime drama Godfather of Harlem portrays Malcolm X's struggles in dealing with the New York mob and his relationship with Bumpy Johnson. Malcolm X is portrayed by Nigél Thatch, who also played Malcolm in the 2014 film Selma. The series ran from 2019 to 2025 and saw 4 seasons with a 2-hour finale release date yet to be announced.

== See also ==
- Assassination of Martin Luther King Jr.
- Assassination of Fred Hampton
- Bibliography of Malcolm X
- Bibliography of Martin Luther King Jr.
