= The Pharmacist (TV series) =

2020 docu-series on Netflix

- Genre: Docuseries
- Written by: Lana Barkin; Jenner Furst; Jed Lipinski; Julia Willoughby Nason
- Directed by: Jenner Furst; Julia Willoughby Nason
- Music by: Danielle Furst; Khari Mateen
- Country of origin: United States
- Original language: English
- No. of seasons: 1
- No. of episodes: 4

Production
- Executive producer: Michael Gasparro
- Producers: Lana Barkin; Jed Lipinski
- Cinematography: Seth Hahn
- Running time: 47–60 minutes
- Production company: The Cinemart

Original release
- Network: Netflix
- Release: February 5, 2020

The Pharmacist is an American true crime documentary series produced by The Cinemart. It released in February 2020 on Netflix, the series relates the efforts of Dan Schneider, an activist and small-town pharmacist in Poydras, Louisiana, to identify his son's killer and how this led to his gathering evidence against a prolific "pill mill" doctor in New Orleans.

== Episodes ==
No.	Title	Original release date
1	"Justice for Danny"	February 5, 2020
Dan Schneider grew up in the Lower 9th Ward of New Orleans, married Annie after high school, and had two children, Danny and Kristi. Dan and Annie moved east to St. Bernard Parish during the 1980s era of white flight. Danny has difficulty during his senior year of high school but attends community college. In 1999, Danny was murdered while purchasing crack cocaine in New Orleans. After finding the police unhelpful due to the apathy from numerous similar drug-related murders in New Orleans, Dan takes a personal role in investigating Danny's murder. Through painstaking investigation, Dan identifies an eyewitness, Shane Madding, who identified Jeffrey Hall as the killer.
2	"A Mission from God"	February 5, 2020
Shane received frequent death threats as the trial approached and moved to Witness Protection, but testified against Jeffrey despite the significant pressure. Jeffrey Hall pleads guilty to manslaughter in exchange for a 15 year sentence. Dan goes back to work as a pharmacist following the conclusion of the trial. Sensitive to youth addiction issues, Dan sees an increase in the frequency of opioid prescriptions and grows suspicious of Dr. Jacqueline Cleggett, a frequent prescriber of OxyContin. Dan, with the help of Robbie, investigate Dr. Cleggett and reported their finds to the DEA. Agents of the DEA started investigating Dr. Cleggett in February 2000 without Dan's knowledge, observing Dr. Cleggett prescribe medication for 76 patients per day and depositing almost $2 million over one year. Annie and Kristi struggle with Dan's continued obsession with the investigation and his increasing paranoia.
3	"Dope Dealers with White Lab Coats"	February 5, 2020
The DEA's investigation uncovers that Dr. Cleggett prescribed over 180,000 pills in just 10 pharmacies. Dan's investigation turns to Purdue Pharma, the manufacturer of OxyContin. Chris Davis, the Purdue sales representative for New Orleans, talks about Purdue's aggressive corporate sales tactics. In 2001, national media coverage recognizes St. Bernard Parish as a region with significant opioid abuse. The Louisiana Medical Board revokes Dr. Cleggett's medical license after Dan provides evidence of prescription abuse.
4	"Tunnel of Hope"	February 5, 2020
Cleggett's medical license is revoked in 2003 after overwhelming evidence is presented. Cleggett is indicted by the United States Attorney, but agrees to a plea deal after being severely injured in a car accident. In the present, Cleggett is interviewed about her prior practice. The opioid crisis deepens following the devastation of St. Bernard Parish from Hurricane Katrina. Dan encourages the prescription management system to monitor prescription distribution, but the tighter control leads to an increase in illicit heroin abuse. Multiple states begin to file prescription abuse cases against Purdue, leading to Purdue filing bankruptcy.

== Reception ==
Review aggregator Rotten Tomatoes reported an approval rating of 89% based on 9 reviews, with an average rating of 8/10 for the miniseries.

== See also ==
- Opioid epidemic in the United States
