= American Murder: Gabby Petito =

- Directed by: Julia Willoughby Nason; Michael Gasparro
- Country of origin: United States
- Original language: English
- No. of episodes: 3

Original release
- Release: February 17, 2025

American Murder: Gabby Petito is a 2025 American true crime documentary miniseries directed by Julia Willoughby Nason and Michael Gasparro for Netflix. The series examines the disappearance and murder of 22-year-old travel blogger Gabby Petito by her fiancé, Brian Laundrie, during a cross-country trip in 2021.

Released after the 2020 Netflix documentary American Murder: The Family Next Door, the miniseries follows a similar documentary style, drawing on archival footage, police body-camera recordings, social media posts, and private text messages to reconstruct the events surrounding the case.

== Synopsis ==
The documentary largely follows the chronology of the Petito case, beginning with the couple's departure from New York in July 2021. It juxtaposes the carefully curated image presented on Petito's Instagram and YouTube accounts with material that points to increasing strain and conflict in her relationship with Laundrie.

Prominent sequences include the August 12, 2021, police stop in Moab, where body-camera footage shows Petito visibly distressed and taking responsibility during the encounter. The series also documents the search efforts following her disappearance in September 2021, the discovery of her remains in Bridger-Teton National Forest, and the later recovery of Laundrie's body in Myakkahatchee Creek Environmental Park, along with a notebook in which he admitted responsibility for Petito's death.

== Production ==
The series was directed by Julia Willoughby Nason and Michael Gasparro. It was produced with the cooperation of Petito's parents, Joseph Petito and Nichole Schmidt, who granted access to personal videos, text messages, and social media material. These materials are used in the series to highlight patterns that commentators have associated with intimate partner violence.

== Reception ==
The Telegraph awarded the series four out of five stars, describing it as chilling and effective in building tension through its use of archival footage and police body-camera recordings. The review noted that the documentary draws attention to missed warning signs and institutional failures without resorting to sensationalism.

Writing for The Indian Express, the reviewer described the series as a haunting account of domestic abuse, while observing that it largely follows familiar true-crime conventions. The review highlighted the emotional weight of the material but suggested that the documentary does not significantly expand public understanding beyond what was already known about the case.

In Slate, critics focused on the series' examination of social media culture, arguing that its use of Petito's online presence and private messages deconstructs the idealized "van life" aesthetic and illustrates how abuse can be obscured behind curated digital personas. The review noted that the documentary's access to personal communications provided additional insight into Petito's state of mind.

The Chicago Sun-Times praised the editing and pacing of the series, stating that it brings urgency and emotional resonance to a story whose outcome was already widely known. The review emphasized the impact of the Moab police stop footage as a central moment in the narrative.

According to The Irish Times, the series offers a stark contrast between Petito's public social media image and the reality of her relationship, though the reviewer described the viewing experience as emotionally taxing and at times voyeuristic.

More critical responses came from Independent.ie, which argued that the documentary adds little perspective beyond Petito's existing footage and questioned whether the series meaningfully advances discussion of the case.

Genre-focused outlets were generally more favorable. Heaven of Horror described the series as raw yet restrained in its approach, while The Review Geek characterized it as a solid and respectfully handled entry in Netflix's true-crime catalogue.

=== Viewership ===
Following its release, the documentary reached the number-one position on Netflix's global trending list and remained within the platform's Top 10 for several weeks.

== Domestic abuse analysis ==
Commentators frequently highlighted the documentary's depiction of intimate partner violence and patterns of victim self-blame. Several critics noted that the series illustrates dynamics associated with coercive control and draws attention to the limitations of external intervention.

=== The Moab police intervention ===
The August 12, 2021, traffic stop in Moab is presented through extended body-camera footage and was widely cited by reviewers as the documentary's emotional turning point. The footage shows Petito visibly distressed while apologizing to officers and minimizing her own situation.

Critics pointed to several dynamics evident in the encounter:

- Reactive abuse: Reviewers noted the contrast between Laundrie's calm demeanor and Petito's emotional state, which they argued influenced how officers assessed the situation.
- Minimization: Messages and footage included in the film show Petito downplaying physical restraint and concealing injuries from family members and social media followers.
- Systemic response: Commentators highlighted the lack of domestic-violence-specific intervention during the stop, noting that officers recommended the couple separate for the night rather than providing support resources.

=== Social media portrayal ===
The documentary uses Petito's travel vlogs to contrast her public online persona with the strain reflected in private communications. Writing for Slate, critics observed that the series examines how aspirational social media aesthetics can obscure abusive dynamics and contribute to isolation. Petito's final text messages are presented in the documentary as illustrating increasing isolation and loss of external support.
