= LuLaRoe =

American multi-level marketing company pyramid scheme

- Company type: Private
- Industry: Fashion (Multi-level Marketing)
- Founded: 2012
- Founders: DeAnne Brady; Mark Stidham
- Headquarters: Corona, California, U.S.
- Area served: United States
- Key people: Mark Stidham (CEO, 2012-2025)
- Products: Women's apparel
- Revenue: ▲US$2.3 billion (2017)
- Website: lularoe.com

LuLaRoe is an American multi-level marketing company that sells women's clothing. It was founded in 2012 by DeAnne Brady and her husband Mark Stidham and is currently based in Corona, California.

As a multi-level marketing company, LuLaRoe recruits independent distributors (referred to by the firm as "fashion consultants") upon ordering nearly $5,000 in inventory, with bonuses paid for selling product to an end customer and for recruitment. A retailer can make money through recruiting or through selling product to an end consumer. The startup cost has been reduced 90% in 2022. LuLaRoe reported sales of approximately US$1 billion in 2016, making it one of the largest firms in the multi-level marketing industry at the time, and by 2017, there were approximately 80,000 independent distributors selling the company's clothing.

The company has received criticism and faced lawsuits from distributors and consumer advocates over several issues related to its business model, and for problems with the quality and design of its products.

A class-action lawsuit filed in California in October 2017 and a lawsuit filed by the Washington State Attorney General in January 2019 accused LuLaRoe of being a pyramid scheme.

== History ==
LuLaRoe was incorporated on May 1, 2013. The company's name was derived by combining the names of Brady's first three granddaughters; Lucy, Lola, and Monroe.

In 2014, LuLaRoe added skirts and dresses to its product line. In mid-2014, LuLaRoe introduced a line of leggings, which would go on to become LuLaRoe's most prominent product. With 23 employees and 750 distributors, the company did $9.8 million in sales. By July 2015, the firm had 2,000 distributors. In an August 2016 interview, LuLaRoe's CEO Mark Stidham claimed that the firm was on track to exceed US$1 billion in sales, and that LuLaRoe had 26,000 distributors and was shipping approximately 350,000 units a day. By April 2017, LuLaRoe had more than 80,000 distributors.

=== Legal issues ===
In early 2017, a class-action lawsuit was filed against LuLaRoe by customers, who complained that the firm's proprietary point-of-sale software incorrectly calculated sales tax rates on interstate sales, and in jurisdictions that do not charge sales tax on clothing. These complaints, combined with complaints over poor quality, led to the company's Better Business Bureau (BBB) rating being downgraded to "F" in January 2017.

In October 2017, a class-action lawsuit filed in California accused LuLaRoe of being a pyramid scheme. Plaintiffs in the suit allege the company engaged in "misconduct, including unfair business practices, misleading advertising, and breach of contract." According to the $1 billion lawsuit, which LuLaRoe argues is baseless and inaccurate, the company allegedly advised its distributors "to borrow money [...] take out credit cards, and some were even asked to sell their breast milk" as ways to buy additional inventory.

In January 2018, the National Down Syndrome Society (NDSS), a charity that had previously worked with LuLaRoe, ended its relationship with the company after a top distributor mocked people with mental disabilities during a livestream sale. The NDSS requested that LuLaRoe sever ties with the distributor, but LuLaRoe declined, stating that they accepted the distributor's apology. The video, and LuLaRoe's reaction to it, prompted widespread online criticism.

In December 2018, in the midst of mounting debt, layoffs, and an exodus of top sellers, LuLaRoe was sued by its chief clothing supplier, Providence Industries, for nearly $49 million. The lawsuit claimed that LuLaRoe was insolvent and had not paid its bills for seven months, and accused founders Mark and DeAnne Stidham of hiding assets in "shell" companies to fund their "lavish lifestyle" and to "hinder, delay, and defraud the creditors."

In January 2019, the Washington State Attorney General's Office filed a lawsuit against LuLaRoe, as well as company CEO Mark Stidham and president DeAnne Stidham, alleging that the multilevel marketing company is an illegal "pyramid scheme", making misleading income claims, and encouraging its consultants to focus more on recruitment than selling clothes to customers. In addition, LuLaRoe's chief clothing supplier, Providence Industries, also filed a lawsuit demanding a seizure of assets. In February 2019, amid hundreds of new complaints totaling 300 cases, the company once again received an "F" rating from the BBB. In October 2019, LuLaRoe announced it would be closing its distribution center in Corona, CA, relocating that part of the business to South Carolina, and laying off 167 people.

In November 2019, LuLaRoe filed a countersuit against its former chief supplier, Providence Industries, seeking at least $1 billion in damages.

In February 2021, LuLaRoe agreed to pay $4.74 million to settle the Washington lawsuit. The settlement will be distributed to LuLaRoe distributors in Washington state. LuLaRoe denied wrongdoing. The settlement prohibits the company from operating a pyramid scheme and also requires it to publish accurate income disclosures, among other measures to improve transparency.

== Business model ==
LuLaRoe clothing is sold only by the company through multi-level marketing distributors. These distributors purchase inventory from LuLaRoe wholesale, which they then resell to consumers. LuLaRoe distributors are required to purchase an initial inventory of clothing and marketing materials that cost between $4,925 and $9,000 (as of 2017) and are recommended to keep around $20,000 worth of inventory on hand.

Distributors can be compensated from two potential revenue streams: from direct sales to customers, and from a commission based on sales made by "downline" distributors they recruit. According to the company's income disclosure statement, in 2015 the average annual commission earned from downline distributors was $85.

LuLaRoe distributors sell LuLaRoe products through a party plan, through pop-up boutiques, or online using private groups that they have set up on Facebook. During a scheduled online event, LuLaRoe distributors use live-streaming video to present their current inventory to members of their Facebook group, with the distributor appearing on-screen to exhibit and describe each item.

LuLaRoe distributors are disproportionately more likely to be in poorer rural areas than urban ones. An example cited by Quartz notes that LuLaRoe lists 10 distributors in Manhattan (population of 1.6 million), and 10 distributors in Pueblo, Colorado, (population of 110,000). This is consistent with other contemporary MLMs, which have concentrated in rural areas that have been slower to recover from the 2008 economic crisis.

=== Products ===
LuLaRoe's main products are brightly patterned leggings, shirts, and dresses. The company's clothes tend toward modesty, based partly on the Stidhams' affiliation with The Church of Jesus Christ of Latter-day Saints. LuLaRoe releases 5,000 copies of any given pattern, and once a product has sold out, it is generally not reissued. LuLaRoe distributors can choose styles and sizes, but not specific patterns, and each distributor is provided different products for their inventory. Distributors have noted that some patterns (known as "unicorns") are significantly easier to sell than others.

The garments are manufactured in Asian and Central American factories via MyDyer, a Los Angeles–based apparel company that also produces for other retailers.

=== Product quality and return policy complaints ===
In late 2016, LuLaRoe began receiving many reports from customers that the firm's leggings ripped and developed holes easily, in some cases shortly after being worn for the first time. In January 2017, the BBB downgraded the company's rating to "F" in response to the company's failure to address complaints, as well as for issues with charging sales tax in places that do not levy sales tax on clothes.

In 2017, customers shared photos of the ripped leggings on social media and created a Facebook group related to the complaints. The same month, a class-action lawsuit was filed against the company by a group of customers. LuLaRoe's head of production attributed the damage to a production process that weakens the fibers while softening them. LuLaRoe's CEO initially downplayed the damage rates as statistically insignificant, but in response to the complaints, on April 24, 2017, the firm implemented new policies to make it easier for customers and distributors to receive refunds on defective merchandise.

In August 2017, multiple distributors complained on social media that they had still not received the refunds promised to them by LuLaRoe. In September, LuLaRoe abruptly ended the changes to its return policy, which it had described as a "waiver". Distributors now receive only 90% of cost and pay for shipping and handling, along with other stricter stipulations. The change in policy prompted a backlash on social media, and a petition to grandfather in the old policies for distributors who were in process of canceling their distributorships.

During 2021, LuLaRoe received an F rating from the Better Business Bureau. As of May 2022, its rating had risen to C.

== In popular media ==
- The Rise and Fall of LuLaRoe, November 2021, Discovery
- LuLaRich is an American documentary miniseries about LuLaRoe that premiered on Amazon Prime in September 2021.
- The American Dad! episode S18E05 makes fun of the company but uses the fantasy company name "Stretcharoos".

== See also ==
- List of multi-level marketing companies
