= James 3X =

American Islamic cleric

James Russell McGregor, also known as James 3X, James Shabazz, and Son of Thunder, was a leader of the Black Muslims and an associate of Malcolm X. Shabazz was a minister and spiritual leader of thousands of Muslims in Newark and Jersey City and had been a member of the Nation of Islam, or Black Muslims, for more than 30 years.

He was murdered in the driveway of his home on September 4, 1973, in Newark, NJ.

== Personal life ==
Shabazz was originally from Southern Pines, North Carolina and was the father of 13 children.

== Nation of Islam ==
Shabazz was the head of Muslim Mosque No. 25 in Newark and in Jersey City at the time of his murder.

== Murder ==
Shabazz was shot several times in the face while opening the door of his 1973 Cadillac in the driveway of his South Seventh Avenue home in Newark. Two gunmen ran off on foot. Police reports indicated that was a power struggle among the Black Muslims and discontent due to several Muslims being recently disbarred from membership.

== Funeral ==
Shabazz's funeral at Mosque No. 25 was attended by over 3,000 people.

== Related incidents ==
Shabazz's murder was one of three related incidents within a year that involved Black Muslims. The Hanafi Murder and the murder of Major Coxson were the other two. Police believed the killing was motivated by internal strife.

After the murder, three reportedly Black Muslims, abducted an off‐duty policeman from the street near Shabazz's home. He was driven around in a car, questioned him about Shabazz, and released. They were arrested later that day and were charged with kidnapping. The day following the kidnapping and release of the police officer, a black man was abducted nearby, driven around in a car for 24 hours, questioned about Shabazz's murder, and released.

A Chicago Tribune article reported, "Internal disputes, including burning of mosques, have characterized the Black Muslims, also known as the Nation of Islam during the last decade. Some of the dissent has been between supporters of Elijah Muhammad, of Chicago and those who think it is time to replace the 75-year old leader of the sect which preaches racial separation. Previously another racial separatist group known as the Black Nationalists rivaled the [Black] Muslims for control of New York during the mid-1960s."

On October 18, 1973, the decapitated bodies of Warren Marcell and Michael A. Huff were found in a Newark Park. Their heads were found four miles away and one block from the home of Shabazz. Sources within the police told the Chicago Tribune, "they suspected the deaths were linked to a violent internal struggle within the Muslims. Twin brothers, Roger and Ralph Banston were killed one month earlier on September 18.

A prison brawl occurred in October 1975 that involved four New World of Islam members serving life sentences for the murder. One prisoner was killed and six were stabbed with sharpened chisels. A Chicago Tribune article referred to the incident as "a preplanned attack by the Black Muslims on the Bellites," and that "Bellites were identified as members of the New World Muslim faction."

== Aftermath ==
Fourteen people were indicted for murder in an alleged conspiracy to seize control of Newark's Mosque No. 25.
