= Mosque No. 25 =

Mosque in New Jersey

Coordinates: 40.739311°N 74.194266°W

Religion
- Affiliation: Nation of Islam

Location
- Location: New Jersey, United States
- Interactive map of Mosque No. 25

Mosque No. 25 is a former Nation of Islam (NOI) mosque in Newark, New Jersey, which was presided by James Russell McGregor (James 3X). It is now known as Masjid Muhhamad.

== History ==
Located at 257 South Orange Avenue in Newark, the building was originally built for Victorian Theatre, a vaudeville theater. It was later known as Congress Theater.

In 1958, Temple No. 25 was the first Nation of Islam mosque to open in Newark, New Jersey. Scholar Michael Nash, states that Elijah Muhammad came to Newark to award a temple number in 1958, but the building was not purchased until a few years later. By 1963 the Newark News called the temple, now at 257 South Orange Avenue, "reputedly one of the fastest growing Muslim groups in the nation" and its leader was James 3X. Its membership had a reputation of being more active and loyal than NOI members in other larger municipalities.

Men involved in Malcolm X's assassination had ties with the mosque, including the 3 men convicted of his murder and two additional accomplices that were not charged. On September 7, 1973, the mosque was the location of the funeral for James Russell McGregor (James Shabazz). About a thousand people were in attendance.
