= LuLaRich =

2021 American documentary miniseries

- Genre: Documentary
- Directed by: Jenner Furst; Julia Willoughby Nason
- Country of origin: United States
- Original language: English

Production
- Executive producers: Jenner Furst; Julia Willoughby Nason; Mike Gasparro; Blye Pagon Faust; Cori Shepherd Stern
- Production companies: Cinemart; Story Force Entertainment; Amazon Studios

Original release
- Network: Amazon Prime Video
- Release: September 10, 2021

LuLaRich is an American documentary miniseries, directed and produced by Jenner Furst and Julia Willoughby Nason and executive produced by Blye Pagon Faust and Cori Shepherd Stern. It follows LuLaRoe, a clothing empire accused of being a pyramid scheme. It consists of four episodes and premiered on Amazon Prime Video on September 10, 2021.

== Plot ==
The series investigates LuLaRoe, a pyramid scheme. It features former employees, sellers, and the owners of the company DeAnne Brady and Mark Stidham.

It features interviews with journalist Jill Filipovic and MLM expert Robert L. FitzPatrick.

== Production ==
After seeing so many LuLaRoe posts from her social circle, Executive Producer Cori Shepherd Stern brought the idea for a LuLaRoe documentary to her filmmaking partner, Blye Pagon Faust. Stern and Faust then approached Jenner Furst and Julia Willoughby Nason with the idea. In July 2020, it was announced Furst and Nason would direct and produce the documentary series revolving around LuLaRoe, with Furst and Nason serving as producers under their Cinemart banner.

In August 2021, it was announced Amazon Studios would co-produce the series, with Amazon Prime Video distributing.
