= Muhammad Abdul Aziz =

American man convicted for the assassination of Malcolm X, later exonerated

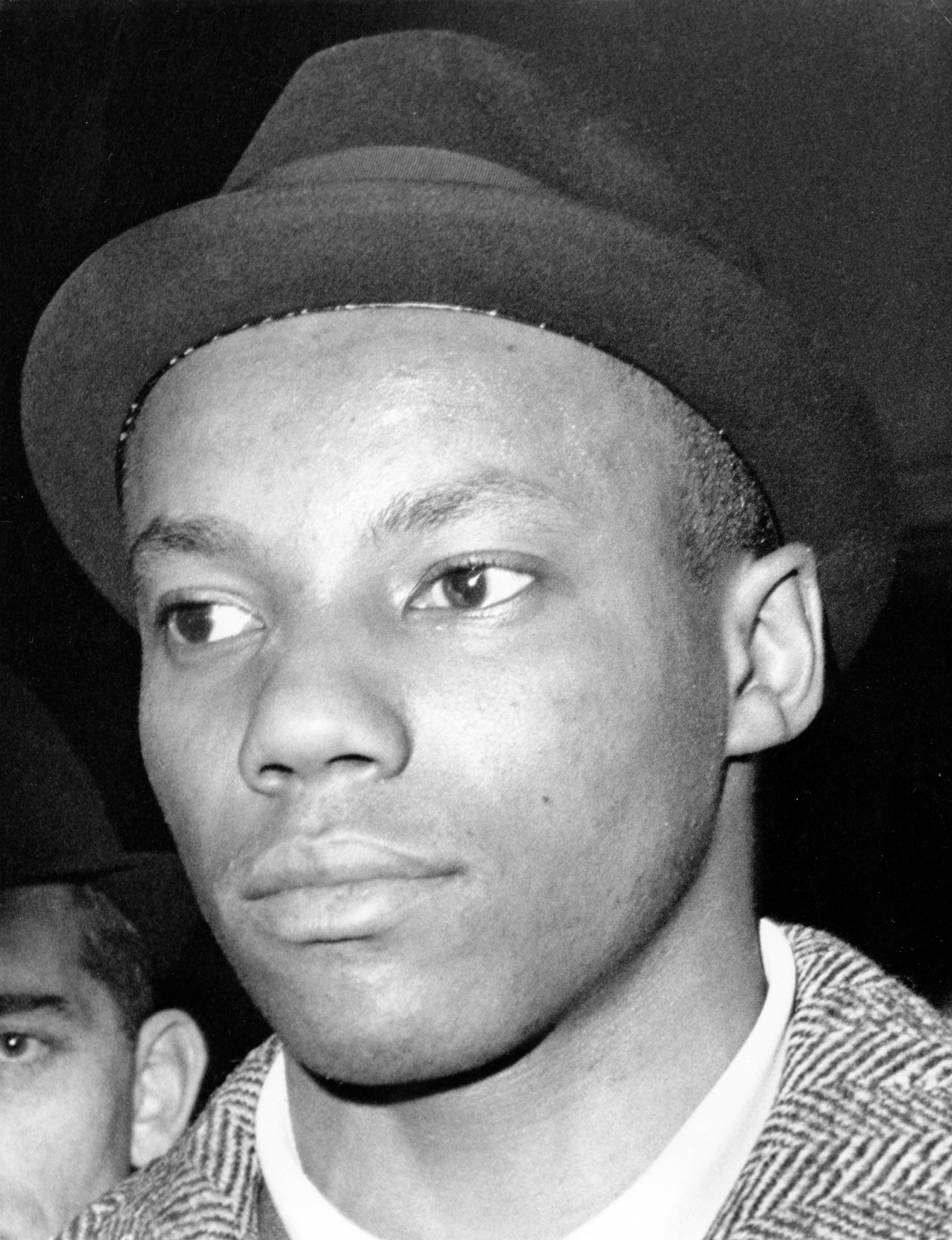
Abdul Aziz in 1965

Muhammad Abdul Aziz (Arabic: محمد عبد العزيز; formerly known as Norman 3X Butler; born 1938) is an American man who was convicted, and later exonerated, for the 1965 assassination of Malcolm X — a conviction that was overturned in November 2021, decades after he was paroled in 1985. Aziz maintained his innocence; and Mujahid Abdul Halim, who confessed to the murder, insisted that Aziz and Khalil Islam, another man who was convicted along with them, were innocent.

== Biography ==
Aziz was a member of the Fruit of Islam, the security arm of the Nation of Islam; though he later converted to Sunni Islam under the leadership of Warith Deen Mohammed. Butler changed his name to Muhammad Abdul Aziz while serving his prison sentence. Aziz is also a veteran of the United States Navy, having enlisted in the late 1950s upon his completion of high school. In March 1998, he was appointed head of security for Masjid Malcolm Shabazz, a Sunni mosque in Harlem, New York, formerly known as NOI Mosque No. 7.

In the days preceding the release of Who Killed Malcolm X?, a six-part Netflix documentary that aired February 7, 2020, New York County District Attorney, Cyrus Vance Jr., announced a preliminary review of Aziz's conviction. On February 11, 2020, Vance met Aziz's attorney David Shanies and representatives of the Innocence Project with plans to re-investigate the case.

After having spent 20 years in prison and nearly 36 years on parole, on November 18, 2021, Aziz was exonerated and his murder conviction overturned, capping off a 22-month-long investigation. With assistance from the Manhattan district attorney's office, lawyers for Aziz and his late co-defendant Khalil Islam (formerly Thomas 15X Johnson) uncovered proof that the FBI and NYPD withheld key evidence from the March 1966 murder trial that could have led to their acquittal. Aziz was previously identified as one of the assassins by witnesses. The third co-defendant, Halim, did not deny his role in the assassination and alleged in Who Killed Malcolm X? that his four co-conspirators all came from the Nation of Islam mosque in Newark. He identified them as Benjamin Thomas, Leon Davis, William X, and a man by the name of either Wilbur or Kinly.

On July 14, 2022, after unsuccessful negotiations with the City of New York, Aziz filed suit in the U.S. District Court in Brooklyn, seeking $40 million in damages related to his wrongful imprisonment. In October 2022, the lawsuit was settled in favor of Aziz and Islam, and the New York City Law Department issued a statement regretting the wrongful conviction of Aziz and Islam, stating in part "This settlement brings some measure of justice to individuals who spent decades in prison and bore the stigma of being falsely accused of murdering an iconic figure."

== See also ==
- Hayer affidavits
- Thomas Hagan
- Bibliography of Malcolm X
- Bibliography of Martin Luther King Jr.

== Sources ==
- "An Innocent Man Spent 20 Years in Prison for Malcolm X's Murder". Innocence Project. 7 February 2020.
- Doeden, Matt (1 February 2013). A Marked Man: The Assassination of Malcolm X. Twenty-First Century Books. ISBN 978-1-4677-1054-1.
- Flynn, Meagan (10 February 2020). "Malcolm X assassination may be reinvestigated as Netflix documentary, lawyers cast doubt on convictions". The Washington Post.
- Jacobs, Shayna (18 November 2021). "Judge vacates convictions of Aziz, Islam in 1965 killing of Malcolm X". The Washington Post.
- Leland, John (6 February 2020). "Who Really Killed Malcolm X?". The New York Times. ISSN 0362-4331.
- McFadden, Robert D. (31 March 1998). "An Assassin Of Malcolm X Gets Islam Post". The New York Times. ISSN 0362-4331.
- Romo, Vanessa (11 February 2020). "Malcolm X Doc Prompts 'Reexamination' Of Iconic Leader's Assassination Investigation". NPR.org.
- Weiss, Debra Cassens (7 February 2020). "Prosecutors consider reviewing convictions in Malcolm X's murder after documentary raises questions". ABA Journal.
