= Kalief Browder =

American teenager incarcerated for three years without trial

- Browder in October 2014
- Born: May 25, 1993; The Bronx, New York, US
- Died: June 6, 2015 (aged 22); The Bronx, New York, US
- Cause of death: Suicide by hanging
- Resting place: The Bronx, New York, US
- Education: Bronx Community College
- Known for: Wrongful imprisonment victim

Kalief Browder (May 25, 1993 – June 6, 2015) was an African American man from The Bronx, New York, who as a teenager, was held at the Rikers Island jail complex, awaiting trial, between 2010 and 2013 on charges of robbery, grand larceny, and assault. He had been arrested at the age of sixteen for allegedly stealing a backpack containing valuables. During his imprisonment, Browder was kept in solitary confinement for 700 days. His charges were eventually dismissed and he was released.

Two years after his release, Browder hanged himself at his parents' home. He was twenty-two years old at the time. His story has been cited by activists campaigning for reform of the New York City criminal justice system and has attracted widespread attention in the years following his death. In 2017, Jay-Z produced a television documentary mini-series titled Time: The Kalief Browder Story. In January 2019, New York City settled a civil lawsuit with the Browder family for $3.3 million.

== Early life ==
At birth, Browder was placed into the care of Child Protective Services due to his mother's drug addiction. He was the youngest of seven biological siblings and one of the five placed for adoption. Browder's adoptive mother, Venida Browder, had raised thirty-four children by 2015 via fostering and adoption. The family lived in a two-story brick house on Prospect Avenue near the Bronx Zoo.

Browder attended the New Day Academy in the Bronx, where staff described him as a very smart and "fun guy".

In 2009, Browder was charged with third-degree grand larceny. Police testified that he had crashed a stolen bakery truck into a stationary car while joyriding. At the age of 16, he was charged as an adult, as per the state law at the time. He pleaded guilty, but later said he was only a bystander. Browder was registered as a youthful offender and placed on probation.

== Arrest ==
On May 15, 2010, police arrested Browder and a friend on Arthur Avenue near East 186th Street in the Belmont section of the Bronx. Browder said he was returning home from a party and believed the stop was a routine stop-and-frisk, which he had previously experienced.

Police were responding to a 911 call from Roberto Bautista, who reported a stolen backpack containing valuables. From the back seat of a police car, Bautista identified Browder and his friend as the thieves, although he gave conflicting dates for the incident and varied in other details of his account. Officers searched Browder but did not find the backpack.

Browder denied involvement and questioned why he was being charged. He and his friend were taken to the 48th Precinct police station, fingerprinted, and held before being transferred to Bronx County Criminal Court for central booking.

Seventeen hours later, Browder was interrogated by a police officer and a prosecutor. The following day he was charged with robbery, grand larceny, and assault. At arraignment, the charge was listed as second-degree robbery, and bail was set at $3,000. With a bail bondsman, $900 would have been required.

Browder’s family could not raise the amount. A neighbor offered to lend money, but the bail bondsman explained that Browder’s probation officer had placed a violation hold, which prevented release regardless of bail. He was taken to Rikers Island to await trial and resolution of the probation matter.

== Imprisonment ==
Browder was jailed at the Robert N. Davoren Center (RNDC) on Rikers Island. Preet Bharara, the United States Attorney for the Southern District of New York, said the RNDC had a "deep-seated culture of violence", in which inmates suffered "broken jaws, broken orbital bones, broken noses, long bone fractures, and lacerations requiring stitches".

Browder said inmates washed their clothes with soap and a metal bucket, causing rust stains on the clothes. Browder's mother began visiting him weekly and provided him with clean clothes and snack money. To avoid becoming a target of the inmates, he slept on top of his belongings, including his bucket. Browder said he felt pressure to gain physical strength to defend himself. He said, "Every here and there I did a couple of pullups or pushups. When I went in there, that's when I decided I wanted to get big."

Browder was a victim of carceral violence. On one occasion, he and other inmates were lined up against a wall. Correction Officers (CO) wanted to find the instigator of a fight. Browder and the inmates were punched, one by one. He said, "Their noses were leaking, their faces were bloody, their eyes were swollen". The guards threatened the inmates with solitary confinement if they reported their injuries.

On October 20, 2010, a gang member spat in Browder's face. Later in the day, Browder punched the gang leader and was set upon by fifteen gang members. On September 23, 2012, a video was recorded showing Browder in handcuffs being assaulted by guards. After a fight with an inmate, Browder was put in solitary confinement for two weeks. He later said of the other inmate, "He was throwing shoes at people. I told him to stop. I took his sneaker and I threw it, and he got mad. He swung at me, and we started fighting."

Altogether, Browder spent nearly two years in solitary confinement, mostly after fights with inmates. Browder later said that while in solitary confinement, correction officers beat him when he was showering. He said a verbal confrontation with a guard would escalate into a physical altercation. During his time in solitary confinement, Browder was allowed to participate in activities such as reading. He also studied for the General Educational Development (GED) examination.

== Trial ==
Brendan O'Meara was appointed as Browder's public defender. Browder consistently maintained his innocence. Although assistant district attorney Peter Kennedy described it as a "relatively straightforward case", the trial was repeatedly delayed because of a backlog at the Bronx County District Attorney's office.

In July 2010, seventy-four days after his arrest, Browder appeared before a judge at the Bronx County Hall of Justice. A grand jury indicted him on a charge of second-degree robbery. A second charge, alleging that he punched and pushed Bautista, was also heard. Browder pleaded not guilty. His family contacted a bail bondsman, but bail was denied because of his prior probation violation.

On December 10, 2010, a potential trial date was set after both sides submitted notices of readiness. On January 28, 2011, 258 days after his arrest, Browder appeared in court again. The prosecution requested a deferment. His record later showed multiple adjournments in 2011, with prosecutors repeatedly stating they were not ready to proceed.

Browder’s communication with O'Meara was mostly through his mother. O'Meara recalled that Browder was "quiet, respectful" and not rude, but that he appeared "tougher and bigger" over time. Browder told his attorney he wanted to go to trial. He declined plea offers of 3.5 years and later 2.5 years in prison in exchange for a guilty plea.

In 2012, further adjournments were recorded as prosecutors again reported they were not ready. By then, Browder had appeared before eight judges. He later said, "These guys are just playing with my case."

On March 13, 2013, Browder appeared before Bronx judge Patricia DiMango. She offered him immediate release if he admitted guilt to two misdemeanors, with time served. Browder refused and was returned to Rikers.

On May 29, 2013, prosecutors revealed that Bautista had returned to Mexico and could not testify. After failing to contact his brother, they informed DiMango that they were no longer able to proceed and sought dismissal. DiMango ordered Browder’s release. He left Rikers the following day, and the charges were formally dropped a week later.

== Legal action ==
After his release, Browder and his brother Akeem sought legal representation. A family member found the Brooklyn civil rights attorney Paul V. Prestia. In 2011, Prestia had represented a Haitian man who had been arrested in the Bronx and was wrongfully jailed for eight days.

In November 2013, Browder filed a lawsuit against the New York City Police Department, the Bronx District Attorney, and the Department of Corrections. Prestia claimed that there had been a malicious prosecution, and the court had been misled about the prosecution's readiness for trial. Prestia also put to the court that the prosecution knew they would have no witness when Bautista returned to Mexico. The City of New York denied these allegations.

== Education and employment ==
Soon after his release, Browder passed the GED examination and later enrolled at the Bronx Community College (B.C.C.). He participated in the City University of New York's "Future Now" program, which offered a college education to previously incarcerated youths. Browder completed 11 credits and finished his semester with a grade point average of 3.56.

Because of depression, Browder did not attend college in the fall semester but re-enrolled in the spring. On May 11, 2015, Browder submitted a paper titled "A Closer Look at Solitary Confinement in the United States", for which he received an "A" grade. He wrote:

Solitary confinement should be looked at as a whole around the United States, and even though changes toward the solitary confinement system have begun in some states, more needs to be done and addressed around the country. In a lot of jails and prisons there are a lot of living circumstances and practices that go on within that are not addressed that people need to shed light on like solitary confinement, for example. Maybe another form of punishment or segregation should be implemented to deal with inmates who break jail rules as opposed to inmates who cause severe harm to other inmates and correction officers because the mental health risk it poses is too great.

Browder worked at the B.C.C. as a tutor in mathematics for the GED. He wanted to work to support his mother. He worked for a while as a security guard but was dismissed when his history of mental illness came to light. He also handed out flyers near Wall Street. Browder said, "I see businessmen and businesswomen dressed in suits ... I want to be successful, like them".

== Suicide attempts and death ==
While incarcerated in 2010, Browder made his first suicide attempt. He tried a second time on February 8, 2012, trying to hang himself using strips of sheet tied to a ceiling light in the cell. Browder later said the COs goaded him to commit suicide. On another occasion, after an appearance before a judge, Browder made a sharp implement from the bucket in his cell and started to slit his wrists. An officer intervened.

After his release, Browder continued to have symptoms of depression. He said:

People tell me that because I have this case against the city I'm all right. But I'm not all right. I'm messed up. I know that I might see some money from this case, but that's not going to help me mentally. I'm mentally scarred right now. That's how I feel. [There] are certain things that changed about me[,] and they might not [change] back. ... Before I went to jail, I didn't know about a lot of stuff, and, now that I'm aware, I'm paranoid. I feel like I was robbed of my happiness.

In November 2013, Browder made another suicide attempt and was admitted to the psychiatric ward of St. Barnabas Hospital, the first of three admissions to the ward. On June 6, 2015, at 12:15 p.m., Browder hanged himself from an air conditioning unit outside his bedroom window at his mother's home. His mother discovered his body.

=== Aftermath ===
==== Protests ====
On June 11, 2015, mourners mounted a three-hour vigil near Manhattan Detention Center and chanted "Justice for Kalief". A concurrent vigil was held on Rikers Island. People held up signs reading "Black Lives Matter". Browder was interred in an unidentified cemetery in Hackensack following a funeral service at Unity Funeral Chapels on June 16, 2015.

On June 27, 2015, an event on Rikers Island was organized through Facebook under the banner, "March to shut down Rikers—Justice for Kalief Browder! No to criminalization!" and the hashtags "#resistRikers" and "#ShutdownRikers". The event gained 500 Facebook responses. At the event, protesters held signs bearing the slogan "Black Lives Matter" and photographs and paintings of Browder.

On August 10, 2015, the anniversary of the shooting death of Michael Brown, fifty peaceful protesters led by Kalief's brother Akeem Browder gathered at the Bronx Supreme Court and chanted "Black Lives Matter".

On October 14, 2016, Browder's mother, Venida Browder, died of complications of a heart attack. Prestia said, "In my opinion, she literally died of a broken heart" because the "stress from this crusade coupled with the strain of the pending lawsuits against the city and the pain from the death were too much for her to bear". Kalief's brother Akeem shared similar thoughts, saying, "My mother has been holding herself strong, but she's heartbroken".

==== Continuation of legal action ====
After his death, Browder's estate continued his legal action against the city. Akeem Browder told BuzzFeed News, "We go back to court on March 21[, 2017]. The judge is probably going to do what they've been doing—which is prolonging. It's a game that they play."

In January 2019, New York City settled a civil lawsuit with the Browder family for $3.3 million.

==== Government response ====
In 2015, in Davis v. Ayala, U.S. Supreme Court Justice Anthony Kennedy cited Browder's case. He said:

There are indications of a new and growing awareness in the broader public of the subject of corrections and solitary confinement in particular. See, for example, Gonnerman, "Before the Law", The New Yorker, October 6, 2014, p. 26 (detailing the multiyear solitary confinement of Kalief Browder, who was held—but never tried—for stealing a backpack); Schwirtz and Winerip, "Man held at Rikers for 3 years without trial, kills himself" New York Times, June 9, 2015, p. A18 ... These are but a few examples of the expert scholarship that, along with continued attention from the legal community, no doubt will aid in the consideration of the many issues solitary confinement presents. And consideration of these issues is needed."

In July 2015, the House of Representatives, House Judiciary Committee, and House Judiciary Crime Subcommittee members John Conyers, Jr. and Sheila Jackson Lee sponsored and introduced a bill, H.R. 2875, the "Law Enforcement Trust and Integrity Act of 2015", and three other bills aimed at reforming youth incarceration. One of the bills in the package was H.R. 3155, "The Effective and Humane Treatment of Youth Act of 2015" or "Kalief's Law", named in honor of Browder.

The bill contained many measures, such as the banning of solitary confinement for youth inmates, the prohibition of shackling and restraining of youth for court appearances without sufficient justification, and a requirement for states to provide a speedy trial. It entered the introductory phase of lawmaking and was referred to the Subcommittee on Crime, Terrorism, Homeland Security, and Investigations, but it ultimately did not become law.

On January 25, 2016, President Barack Obama signed an executive order to ban the solitary confinement of juveniles in federal prisons. Obama wrote an op-ed in The Washington Post, in which he cited Browder's case, writing, "In 2013, Kalief was released, having never stood trial ... He completed a successful semester at Bronx Community College. But life was a constant struggle to recover from the trauma of being locked up alone for 23 hours a day. One Saturday, he committed suicide at home. He was just 22 years old."

In October 2016, the New York City Correction Commissioner, Joseph Ponte, wrote an op-ed in the Gotham Gazette stating that New York City would cease to place prisoners between the ages of 19 and 21 in solitary confinement. He wrote, "This is an unprecedented milestone in New York State correctional history and, even more important, across the nation. To date, no other city or state has accomplished comparable punitive-segregation reforms for the 19 – 21 year-old age group."

Mayor Bill de Blasio said, "Today's announcement shows that New York City is leading the nation down a new path toward rehabilitation and safety. New Yorkers can be proud that their correctional facilities are pioneering these smarter, more humane approaches." This marked the implementation of the measure that New York City officials had voted on in January 2015.

In 2017, de Blasio said, "New York City will close the Rikers Island jail facility." The New York City Council voted in October 2019 to close the Rikers Island jails and other New York City jails by 2026.

On April 10, 2017, Governor Andrew Cuomo signed into law the "Raise the Age" initiative that would send most cases involving 16- and 17-year-old defendants to the Family Court or be reviewed by judges with special training in social services.

== Legacy ==
=== Media ===
In the October 2014 issue of The New Yorker, Jennifer Gonnerman wrote an article about Browder. In November 2014, Browder and Prestia appeared on the television talk show The View. Browder said his appearance on the show was a "good opportunity to get [his] voice heard" and that it was difficult to speak about his experience in prison. Rapper and businessman Jay Z also contacted Browder.

Ava DuVernay's 2016 Oscar-nominated documentary 13th, about race and mass incarceration, includes video interviews with Browder.

In March 2017, Time: The Kalief Browder Story, a six-part television documentary series produced by Jay Z and Harvey Weinstein, was broadcast on the Spike television network. Jay Z said,

I knew right there that [Kalief] was a prophet. Some of our prophets go with tragedy, Martin Luther King, ended tragically. But what comes from it, the life, the next iteration, the lives saved, and how this young man has moved culture forward is incredible.

In an essay published in Vibe, the singer John Legend wrote,

New York failed Kalief. The list of things that went wrong in his case begins with his first encounter with the NYPD, whose practice of targeting black teens is well documented. The idea that being accused of stealing a backpack would lead to his arrest and detention would be absurd if it weren't tragic.

Browder's story was detailed in an episode of Last Week Tonight with John Oliver from 2022. Oliver went on to explain that they had originally intended to cover Browder's story in 2015, but chose not to as the intended episode would have aired the day after Browder's death.

Sisa Bueno directed For Venida, For Kalief (2025), a documentary film which tells the story of Browder and features the poetry of his late mother Venida, the archival footage of the Citywide Jail Rebellion in 1970, and the movement to shut down Rikers Island. The film had its world premiere on June 6, 2025, in the Documentary Competition at the 2025 Tribeca Festival.

=== Memorials ===
On May 25, 2017, the corner of East 181st Street and Prospect Avenue in the Bronx was renamed "Kalief Browder Way" in his memory.

== See also ==
- Solitary confinement in the United States
