= Julia Willoughby Nason =

American director of documentary films

Julia Willoughby Nason is an American director of documentary films.

== Biography ==
Julia Willoughby Nason was born and raised in New York City. She graduated from Hampshire College. She has collaborated with her former Hampshire College classmate Jenner Furst on several projects.

Several programs she directed, produced, or wrote were nominated for awards. These include Rest in Power: The Trayvon Martin Story (2018) and Fyre Fraud (2019), which were nominated for Emmy Awards, and Time: The Kalief Browder Story (2017), which won a Peabody Award.

Other programs Nason is known for include Welcome to Leith (2015), which aired as part of the series Independent Lens, The Pharmacist (2020), LuLaRich (2021), Murdaugh Murders: A Southern Scandal (2023), and Shiny Happy People: Duggar Family Secrets (2023).

== Selected filmography ==
- Time: The Kalief Browder Story (2017): Executive producer
- Rest in Power: The Trayvon Martin Story (2018): Director, executive producer
- Fyre Fraud (2019): Director, executive producer
- The Pharmacist (2020) TV miniseries: Director, executive producer
- LuLaRich (2021) TV miniseries: Director, executive producer
- Murdaugh Murders: A Southern Scandal (2023) TV mini series: Director, executive producer
- Shiny Happy People: Duggar Family Secrets (2023): Director
- American Murder: Gabby Petito (2025): Director
