= Rest in Power: The Trayvon Martin Story =

- Genre: Documentary
- Based on: Suspicion Nation: The Inside Story of the Trayvon Martin Injustice and Why We Continue to Repeat It by Lisa Bloom Rest in Power: The Enduring Life of Trayvon Martin by Sybrina Fulton & Tracy Martin
- Written by: Jenner Furst; Julia Willoughby Nason; Lana Barkin; Chris Passig
- Directed by: Jenner Furst; Julia Willoughby Nason
- Composers: Khari Marteen; Danielle Furst
- Country of origin: United States
- Original language: English
- No. of episodes: 6

Production
- Executive producers: Michael Gasparro; Jenner Furst; Julia Willoughby Nason; Nick Sandow; Chachi Senior; Shawn Carter; Tracy Martin; Sybrina Fulton; David C. Glasser
- Cinematography: Daniel Levin; Ty Stone
- Editors: Chad Beck; Devin Concannon; Chris Passig
- Running time: 42–43 minutes
- Production company: Cinemart

Original release
- Network: Paramount Network
- Release: July 30 – September 10, 2018

Rest in Power: The Trayvon Martin Story is an American documentary television series that premiered on July 30, 2018 on Paramount Network. The six-episode series documents the killing of Trayvon Martin and explores the racial tension in the United States that was brought about in its wake. The series is executive produced by Sybrina Fulton, Tracy Martin, Jay-Z, Chachi Senior, Michael Gasparro, Jenner Furst, Julia Willoughby Nason, and Nick Sandow. Furst and Nason also directed the series as well.

== Premise ==
Rest in Power: The Trayvon Martin Story focuses on the killing of Trayvon Martin that became a huge American talking point and helped spur the "Black Lives Matter" movement. The docuseries delves into the tragic event which the network describes as "a story about race, politics, power, money and the U.S. criminal justice system."

== Production ==
=== Development ===
On March 23, 2017, it was announced that The Weinstein Company and Jay-Z had won a heated bidding war for the screen rights to two books, Suspicion Nation: The Inside Story of the Trayvon Martin Injustice and Why We Continue to Repeat It by Lisa Bloom and Rest in Power: The Enduring Life of Trayvon Martin by Sybrina Fulton and Tracy Martin. The producers' plan was reportedly to take the books and adapt them into two separate projects: a six-part documentary television series and a narrative feature film. Other studios had been interested in the screen rights such as Fox Searchlight and Universal Pictures (who had been attempting to obtain them for Will Packer and Ted Field). The Weinstein Company's Harvey Weinstein and David Glasser had a meeting during the weekend of the Academy Award in their Los Angeles office with Jay-Z and Martin's parents. The pair was able to win them over by making it clear that their greatest concern was seeing their Martin's life and legacy honored.

On April 6, 2017, it was announced that the Paramount Network had given a series order to the production, now titled Rest in Power: The Trayvon Martin Story. The series order consisted of six episodes for the program with executive producers including Jay-Z, Harvey Weinstein, David C. Glasser, Chachi Senior, Sybrina Fulton, Tracy Martin, Jenner Furst, Nick Sandow, Julia Willoughby Nason, and Michael Gasparro. On October 9, 2017, it was announced that following reports of sexual abuse allegations against producer Harvey Weinstein, his name would be removed from the series' credits as would The Weinstein Company as well.

On July 2, 2018, it was announced that the series would premiere on July 30, 2018.

=== George Zimmerman controversy ===
On December 16, 2017, George Zimmerman claimed in an interview that a production team for the series led by executive producer Michael Gasparro made unannounced visits to his parents' and uncle's homes in Florida in an attempt to get them on camera. He alleged that the crew harassed his family and that they refused to pay his parents or family members if they did decide to participate in the series. He went to remark that, "I know how to handle people who fuck with me, I have since February 2012." He further said that he holds producers Jay-Z and Gasparro responsible and that, "anyone who fucks with my parents will be fed to an alligator." A day later, rap artist Snoop Dogg commented via Instagram post saying, "If one hair on jays hair is touched that's when the revolution will b televised". He then went on to criticize "the system" and called Zimmerman a "Bitch ass muthafucca". On March 2, 2018, Jay-Z himself seemed to respond to Zimmerman's threats in a rap verse of his in the song "Top Off" by DJ Khaled saying, "Meanwhile Georgie Porgie sinnin' and sendin' me threats/Save your breath, you couldn't beat a flight of steps/Try that shit with a grown man/I'll kill that fuckboy with my own hand" On May 7, 2018, Zimmerman was charged with stalking, against a private investigator who had been working with the producers of the series. According to the investigator, Zimmerman contacted him with 21 phone calls, 38 text messages and 7 voicemails in two and a half hours.

== Episodes ==
No.	Title	Directed by	Written by	Original release date	U.S. viewers (millions)
1	"Stand Your Ground"	Jenner Furst & Julia Willoughby Nason	Jenner Furst, Julia Willoughby Nason, Lana Barkin, & Chris Passig	July 30, 2018	0.470 (Note: Five of the six episodes of the series were simulcast on BET. The first episode was viewed by an additional 743,000 viewers, the second by an additional 367,000 viewers, the third by an additional 351,000 viewers, the fourth by an additional 317,000 viewers, and the sixth by an additional 368,000.)
2	"The Elephant in the Room"	Jenner Furst & Julia Willoughby Nason	Jenner Furst, Julia Willoughby Nason, Lana Barkin, & Chris Passig	August 6, 2018	0.263
3	"Justice for George"	Jenner Furst & Julia Willoughby Nason	Jenner Furst, Julia Willoughby Nason, Lana Barkin, & Chris Passig	August 13, 2018	0.250
4	"The Burden of Proof"	Jenner Furst & Julia Willoughby Nason	Jenner Furst, Julia Willoughby Nason, Lana Barkin, & Chris Passig	August 27, 2018	0.227
5	"Reasonable Doubt"	Jenner Furst & Julia Willoughby Nason	Jenner Furst, Julia Willoughby Nason, Lana Barkin, & Chris Passig	September 3, 2018	0.257
6	"Et Tu, America?"	Jenner Furst & Julia Willoughby Nason	Jenner Furst, Julia Willoughby Nason, Lana Barkin, & Chris Passig	September 10, 2018	0.178

== Release ==
=== Marketing ===
On February 26, 2018, the Paramount Network released the first trailer for the series announced that the series would premiere in July 2018. On July 2, 2018, a second trailer was released.

=== Premiere ===
On April 20, 2018, the series held its world premiere at the BMCC Tribeca Performing Arts Center in New York City, New York during the annual Tribeca Film Festival. Following the screening, a question-and-answer session was held moderated by Joy Reid and featuring co-directors Julia Willoughby Nason and Jenner Furst, the parents of Trayvon Martin, Sybrina Fulton and Tracy Martin, and executive producers Mike Gasparro and Chachi Senior. On May 30, 2018, a private screening of the series' first episode was held for Sybrina Fulton and Tracy Martin at the Lyric Theater in Miami, Florida. On June 16, 2018, an episode of the series was screened at the Colony Theater in Miami Beach, Florida during the American Black Film Festival.

== Reception ==
The series has been met with critical acclaim since its premiere. On the review aggregation website Rotten Tomatoes, the series holds a 100% approval rating, with an average rating of 7.8 out of 10 based on 10 reviews. Metacritic, which uses a weighted average, assigned the series a score of 86 out of 100 based on 6 critics, indicating "universal acclaim".

In a positive review, Entertainment Weekly's Kristen Baldwin awarded the series a grade of "B+" and offered it praise by referring to it as a "powerful, painful gut-punch." She did however offer critique of the final episode and advocated for a potential follow-up season saying, "the last episode of Rest in Power feels like a conversation that gets cut off mid-sentence. What started as an effort to record a moment in history became, by the end, a documentary of the moment we're living now. If ever a series had enough material for a second season, sadly this is it." In another enthusiastic critique, The Hollywood Reporter's Robyn Bahr commended the series calling it a "a powerful, reformist docuseries" and compared it to the rise of black horror films like Get Out saying, "Rest in Power: The Trayvon Martin Story — Paramount Network's gutting six-part docuseries from directors Jenner Furst and Julia Willoughby Nason ― is another addition to this growing genre, a real-life absurdist horror story where truth is fiction and victims are villains."

Rest in Power: The Trayvon Martin Story was nominated for an Emmy for Outstanding Social Issue Documentary at the 40th News and Documentary Emmy Awards. In 2019, the series was a recipient for the 12th Television Academy Honors.
