= Thomas Hagan =

Assassin of Malcolm X (born 1941)

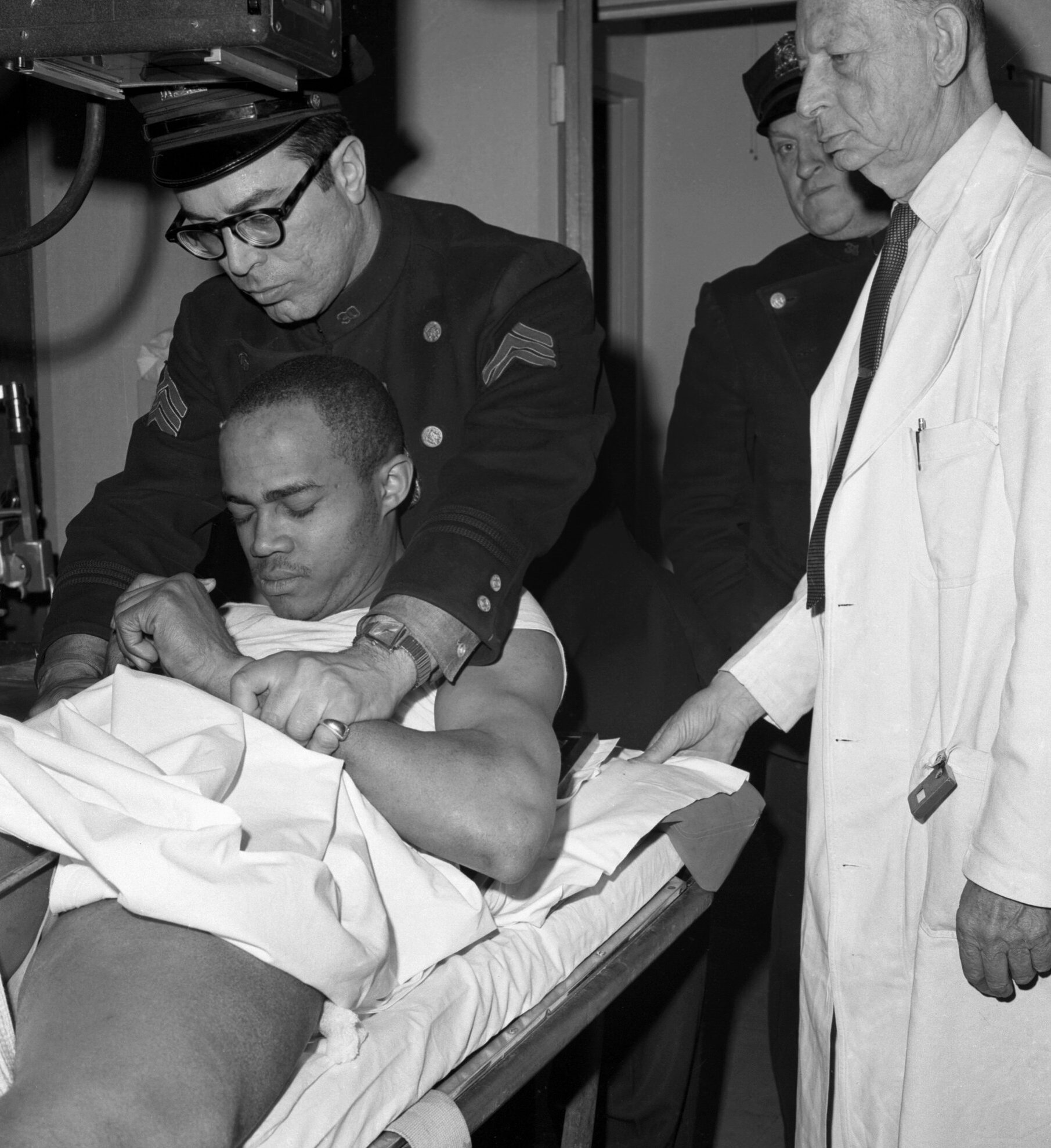
- Hagan being restrained by a police officer at the hospital where he was taken after assassinating Malcolm X
- Born: March 16, 1941 (age 85)
- Other names: Talmadge X Hayer, Mujahid Abdul Halim
- Known for: Assassinating Malcolm X
- Status: Paroled by the New York State Division of Parole on March 19, 2010; 16 years ago
- Conviction: Second degree murder
- Penalty: 20 years to life in prison

Details
- Victims: Malcolm X
- Date: February 21, 1965
- Locations: Manhattan, New York City, U.S.
- Weapons: Sawed-off shotgun 2 semi-automatic pistols

Thomas Hagan (/ˈheɪɡən/; born March 16, 1941) is an American former member of the Nation of Islam who assassinated Malcolm X in 1965. For a period he also went by the name Talmadge X Hayer, and his chosen Islamic name is Mujahid Abdul Halim (Arabic: مجاهد عبد الحليم).

== Assassination of Malcolm X ==
Malcolm X was shot on February 21, 1965, in the Audubon Ballroom in Washington Heights, Manhattan, New York City. Hagan was shot in the leg by one of Malcolm X's bodyguards while attempting to flee from the building. Hampered by his bullet wound, Hagan was grabbed by several members of the crowd who witnessed the shooting and beat him before police officers arrived and arrested Hagan at the scene. He later confessed to the crime but said that Thomas Johnson (Khalil Islam) and Norman 3X Butler (Muhammad Abdul Aziz), two suspects arrested at a later point in time, were not involved in the assassination.

Hagan stated in a 1977 affidavit that he had planned the shooting with four others (Johnson and Butler not being among them) to seek revenge for Malcolm X's public criticism of Elijah Muhammad and the Nation of Islam. He said that one of his accomplices, William 25X Bradley, distracted Malcolm X's bodyguards by starting an argument about having been pickpocketed. When the bodyguards moved toward the diversion and away from Malcolm X, a man with a shotgun stepped up to him and shot him in the chest. After that, Hagan himself and another of his accomplices shot several rounds at Malcolm X with semi-automatic handguns.

== Later life ==
Hagan, Butler, and Johnson all received 20-years-to-life sentences in 1966. During his time in jail, Hagan earned bachelor's and master's degrees; he filed 16 times for parole but was denied each time. Butler was paroled in 1985 and Johnson in 1987. From 1988, Hagan was in a work release program, which allowed him to seek work outside the prison. It required him to spend only two days a week in Lincoln Correctional Facility, a minimum-security facility in Manhattan. For the rest of the week, he was allowed to stay with his wife and children. Among other places, he worked at the Crown Heights Youth Collective, as a counselor at a homeless shelter on Wards Island, and in a fast-food restaurant. Hagan was granted parole in March 2010 and was released from prison at the end of April.

In 2021, Hagan expressed support that the convictions of Thomas Johnson and Norman 3X Butler were overturned, matching his original claims that they were not involved in the murder of Malcolm X.

Hagan is still a practicing Muslim, but has left the Nation of Islam, no longer agreeing with their ideology. He has expressed "regrets and sorrow" for having shot Malcolm X.

== See also ==
- Bibliography of Malcolm X
- Bibliography of Martin Luther King Jr.
