= Hayer affidavits =

Statements about killing of Malcolm X

The Hayer affidavits are two affidavits made by Talmadge Hayer—also known by the name Thomas Hagan—the convicted assassin of Malcolm X. The statements give Hayer's account of his involvement in the planning and execution of the murder.

== Background ==
Three men were convicted of the 1965 assassination of Malcolm X: Talmadge Hayer, Norman 3X Butler, and Thomas 15X Johnson. At first, Hayer denied any involvement, but during the trial, he confessed to having fired shots at Malcolm X. He testified that Butler and Johnson were not present and were not involved in the shooting, but he declined to name the men who had joined him in the attack. Nonetheless, all three men were convicted.

== Affidavits ==
In 1977 and 1978, Hayer submitted two affidavits re-asserting his claim that Butler and Johnson were not involved in the assassination. In his affidavits, Hayer named four men—all members of the Nation of Islam's Newark, New Jersey, Temple Number 25 —as having participated with him in the crime. Hayer asserted that a man he knew as "Wilbur" or "Kinly", later identified as Wilbur McKinley, shouted and threw a smoke bomb to create a diversion. Hayer said that a man named "Willie", later identified as William Bradley, had a shotgun and was the first to fire on Malcolm X after the diversion. Hayer asserted that he and a man named "Lee" or "Leon", later identified as Leon Davis, both armed with pistols, fired on Malcolm X immediately after the shotgun blast. Hayer also said that a man named "Ben", later identified as Benjamin Thomas, was involved in the conspiracy. Hayer's statements failed to convince authorities to reopen their investigation of the murder.

== Aftermath ==
Butler, now known as Muhammad Abdul Aziz, was paroled in 1985. He became the head of the Nation of Islam's Harlem mosque in New York in 1998. He continues to maintain his innocence. Johnson, who changed his name to Khalil Islam, was released from prison in 1987. During his time in prison, he rejected the teachings of the Nation of Islam and converted to Sunni Islam. He maintained his innocence until his death in August 2009. Hayer, now known as Mujahid Halim, also disavowed the Nation of Islam's ideology, though he remains a practicing Muslim. Hayer has expressed regret for his role in the assassination. He was paroled in 2010.

Benjamin Thomas was killed in 1986. As of 1989, Leon Davis was reported to be living in Paterson, New Jersey. Little is known about Wilbur McKinley, and one researcher has concluded that he is dead.

William Bradley spent decades as a criminal. He was charged in connection with a 1968 bank robbery in Livingston, New Jersey, but in the end charges against him were dismissed. During the 1980s, Bradley was convicted of several charges related to robbery, aggravated assault, and drug possession. As of 2011, he was living in Newark, New Jersey, under the name Al-Mustafa Shabazz. Through his attorney, Bradley (Al-Mustafa Shabazz) denied having participated in any way in the assassination. Bradley died in 2018.

== See also ==
- Bibliography of Malcolm X
- Bibliography of Martin Luther King Jr.
