= Time: The Kalief Browder Story =

- Genre: Documentary
- Created by: Julia Willoughby Nason
- Written by: Rose Schlossberg; Mark Konkol
- Directed by: Jenner Furst
- Country of origin: United States
- Original language: English
- No. of seasons: 1
- No. of episodes: 6

Production
- Executive producers: Shawn “Jay Z” Carter; Harvey Weinstein; David Glasser
- Producers: Shawn Carter; Jenner Furst; Nick Sandow; Julia Willoughby-Nason; Michael Gasparro; Chachi Senior
- Production locations: Bronx, New York City, New York
- Editor: Chris Passig
- Camera setup: James Adolphus
- Running time: 43 minutes
- Production companies: Roc Nation; The Weinstein Company; Cinemart

Original release
- Network: Spike and BET
- Release: March 1, 2017

Time: The Kalief Browder Story is a six-episode American documentary television miniseries that broadcast on Spike beginning March 1, 2017. The documentary recounts the story of Kalief Browder, a Bronx high school student who was imprisoned for three years, two of them in solitary confinement on Rikers Island, without being convicted of a crime.

He was accused at 16 of stealing a backpack, and his family was unable to afford his bail, set at $3,000.

== Production ==
The series was directed by Jenner Furst. Jay-Z, Harvey Weinstein and David Glasser were executive producers.

== Episodes ==
- Episode 1 - The System
- Episode 2 - The Island
- Episode 3 - The Bing
- Episode 4 - The Witness
- Episode 5 - Injustice for All
- Episode 6 - The After Life

== Reception ==
Writing at Jezebel, Julianne Escobedo Shepherd described Time as "very likely one of the most devastating documents I have ever seen, and one of the most important: It seems impossible to watch this and not want to take action." At Deadline, Dominic Patten called the series "television you should take the time to watch. Even if the horrors of an innocent teenager thrown into the hell of Rikers Island and the broken criminal justice system is something...that makes you want to look away."

Philadelphia Daily News critic Ellen Gray said, "I can't remember the last time anything left me as shaken as Time: The Kalief Browder Story," but "we have to be willing not to look away." Writing for Variety, Maureen Ryan said, "Though it may veer into the melodramatic at times, “Time” has an important story to tell, and is imbued with a passionate desire to present every important aspect of the injustices done to Browder — and thousands of other men and women like him. Though it uses Browder's experiences to indict a whole system, to its credit, “Time” never loses sight of the man at the center of this case, who endured a tragedy as unforgettable as it is American."

Its premiere episode earned 750,000 first-run viewers in the United States across Spike and BET.

== International broadcast ==
The series is distributed by Netflix in all countries including the United States.
