= Mystic Hot Springs =

Thermal springs and resort

- Monroe Hot Springs; Cooper Hot Springs
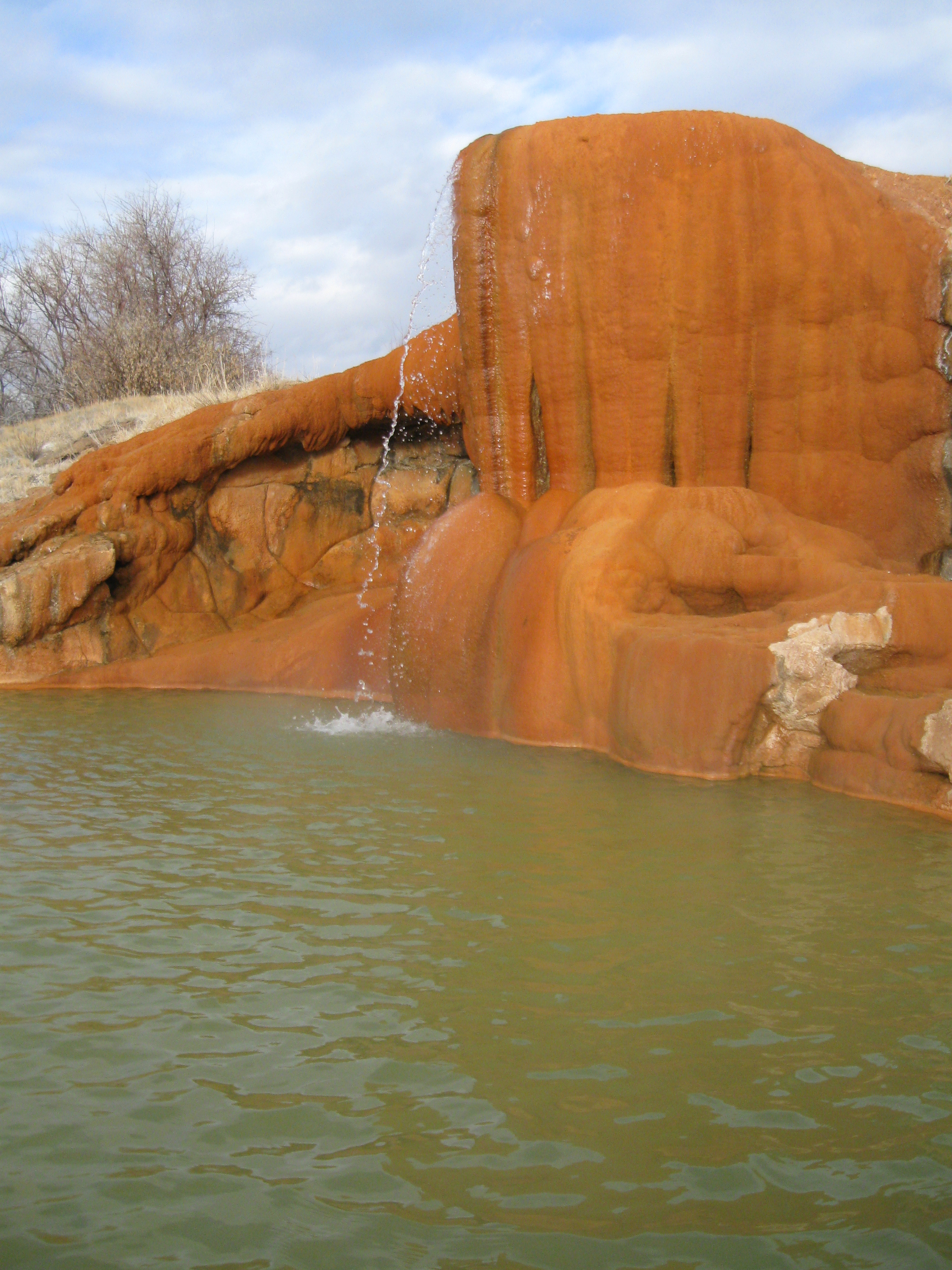
- Mystic Hot Springs, December 2010

- Location within Utah Location within the United States
- Interactive map of Mystic Hot Springs
- Location: Monroe, Utah
- Coordinates: 38°37′58.8″N 112°6′34″W
- Elevation: 5,459 feet (1,664 m)
- Type: Geothermal spring
- Discharge: 200 gallons per minute
- Temperature: 168 °F (76 °C)

Mystic Hot Springs, previously known as Monroe Hot Springs and Cooper Hot Springs are located in northeastern Monroe, Utah. The hot mineral water emerges from the spring at 168 °F (76 °C). The water flows into two smaller pools with temperatures between 92 and 102 °F (33 and 39 °C).

== History ==
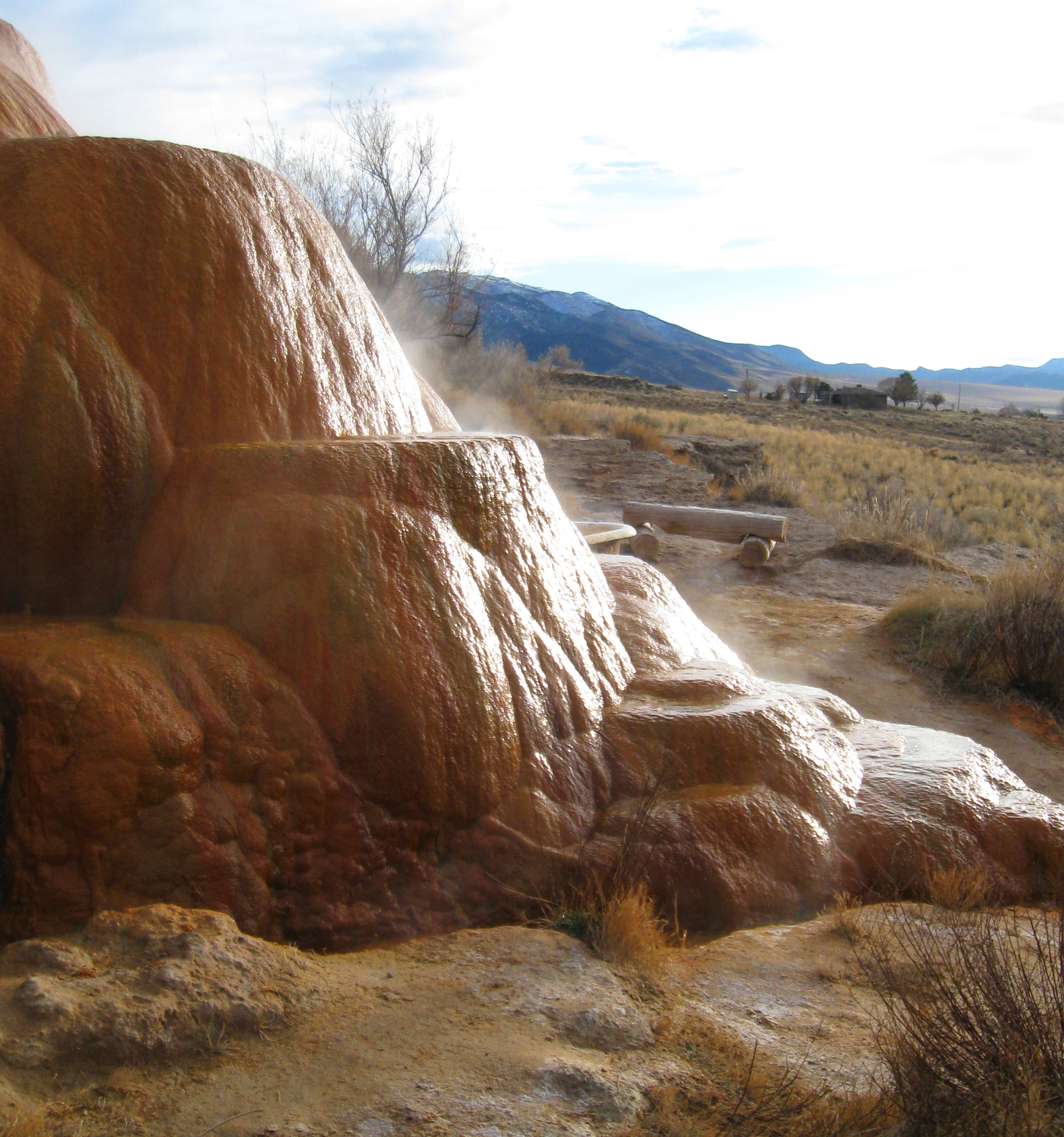
Main Springs at Mystic Hot Springs, December 2010

The hot mineral springs were used by the local indigenous peoples including the Ute, Piute, Shoshone and their ancestors. Early settlers used the springs later, as they were a stop on the Old Spanish Trail. In 1886, Thomas Cooper and his family homesteaded the land on which the springs are located. In 1905 the Coopers built a bathhouse. Later the property was developed to include a dance hall and cabins. In 1930, a Mr. Farnsworth purchased the property and led the house band during events in the dance hall. In the 1970s the structures were renovated, and in 1995, the name was changed from Monroe Hot Springs to Mystic Hot Springs. Mike Ginsburg purchased the property in 1996, and the tradition of music concerts continued at the springs.

== Geology ==
The hydrothermal system is located within the zone of activity of the Sevier Fault. The geothermally heated water has mixed with minerals in the surrounding rocks, creating rust-colored travertine terraces.

== Water profile ==
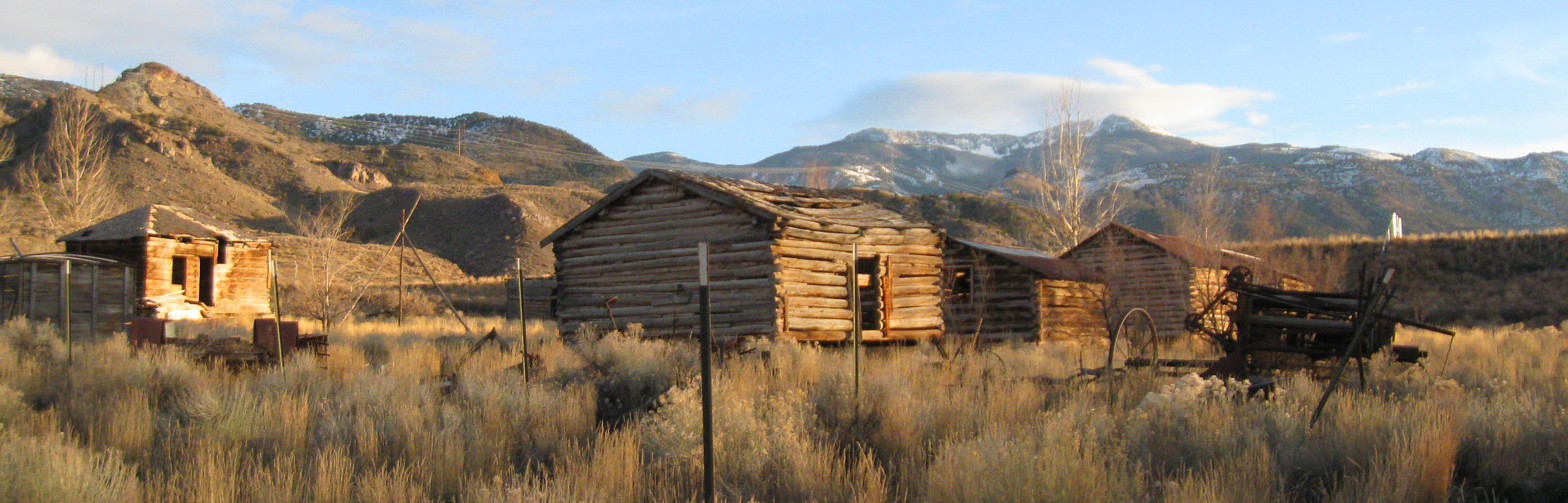
Old cabins at Mystic Hot Springs, December 2010

The spring water emerges from the ground at 168 °F (76 °C) and contains calcium carbonate, magnesium, iron and other minerals.

== Location ==
The hot springs are located at 475 East 100 North (38°37′58.8″N 112°6′34″W)

== See also ==
- List of hot springs in the United States
- List of hot springs in the world
