= Petrosino (disambiguation) =

Petrosino is a town in Sicily, Italy.

Petrosino may also refer to:

- Lieutenant Joseph Petrosino Park, Bensonhurst, Brooklyn, New York City
- Petrosino Square, a park in lower Manhattan in New York City, named for Joseph Petrosino

== People with the surname ==
- Joseph Petrosino (1860–1909), New York City police officer and organized crime investigator
- Kiki Petrosino (born 1979), American poet and professor
- Natty Hollmann (aka Natty Petrosino; 1936–2021), Argentinian philanthropist, humanitarian, actor, and model

== See also ==
- Maria Perosino (1961–2014), Italian author and art historian
- Petrosina, a suborder of marine haplosclerid sponges
