= New York City Police Headquarters =

New York City Police Headquarters may refer to the following buildings:

- 240 Centre Street, the headquarters from 1909 to 1973
- 1 Police Plaza, the headquarters since 1973
