= Stephen P. Kennedy =

American police commissioner (1906–1978)

- Born: Stephen Patrick Kennedy; October 27, 1906; Greenpoint, Brooklyn, New York, U.S.
- Died: October 17, 1978 (aged 71); San Diego, California, U.S.
- Police career
- Department: New York Police Department
- Service years: 1929–1961
- Rank: Commissioner

Stephen Patrick Kennedy (October 27, 1906 – October 17, 1978) was an American law enforcement officer who served as New York City Police Commissioner from 1955 to 1961.

== Early life ==
Kennedy was born on October 27, 1906, in Greenpoint, Brooklyn. Prior to entering the police force he worked as a longshoreman, boxer, seaman, and was a secretary at U.S. Steel. In 1929 he married Hortense Goldberger, whom he had known since childhood. In 1932 they purchased a semi-detached home in Queens. Until Kennedy became commissioner they rented the lower floor and lived upstairs. They had two children, one of whom died at the age of two from cancer.

== Early career ==
Kennedy joined the department in 1929. On September 26, 1945, he was promoted to captain and assigned to police headquarters to perform some of the duties held by Arthur W. Wallander before he was promoted to commissioner. On January 2, 1946, he was placed in command of the Thirteenth Precinct. On February 1, 1949, he was promoted to deputy inspector. One month later he was given command of all of New York City's waterfront squads as part of commissioner William P. O'Brien's effort to fight organized crime on the city's waterfront. He later served as police liaison to the civil defense organization, commanded a special gambling squad based in Brooklyn, and was the department's liaison to the Precinct Coordinating Council. On January 12, 1954, he was promoted to chief inspector.

While a member of the NYPD, Kennedy also attended night school, where he earned his high school diploma, took pre-law courses at St. John's University, and earned a law degree from New York University School of Law.

== Commissioner ==
When Commissioner Francis W. H. Adams resigned to return to his law practice, he recommended Kennedy as his successor. He was sworn in by Mayor Robert F. Wagner Jr. on August 2, 1955. Upon taking office, Kennedy pledged to keep politics out of the department, protect the rights of the innocent, cooperate fully with all other law enforcement agencies, fight corruption within and outside of the department, and increase pay for police officers. Kennedy's biggest concerns were corruption inside the department and juvenile delinquency. Fighting racial prejudice within the department was also a major concern, however he opposed assigning more black officers to black neighborhoods, as he believed making appointments based on race or religion would go against integration. He completed Adams' term and on February 20, 1956, was given a 5-year term of his own.

Although Kennedy had widespread public support, his tenure as commissioner was marked by his poor relationship with rank-and-file NYPD officers. He opposed "curbstone justice" and instead instructed his officers to prioritize arrests and have cases decided by the courts. He wanted all criminal complaints looked into, even if the officer found them frivolous. He also fought against graft and wanted any officer found guilty of misconduct to be written up and put on departmental trial. Kennedy was against the unionization of the NYPD and opposed the Police Benevolent Association of the City of New York's effort to become the force's official bargaining agent. In 1960, 2,000 officers petitioned the New York Supreme Court to arrest Kennedy after he defied an order to make promotions based on the civil service list.

Further, Kennedy had a truculent reputation for going after anyone who opposed him. He went all the way to the chief magistrate to see that the head of the PBA was fined for a parking violation and, after a citizens' organization alleged police corruption in issuing cabaret permits, Kennedy had the group's leader investigated and unearthed a number of unpaid parking violations.

In 1955, he refused to comply with Wagner's executive order granting a television crew headed by Theodore Granik access to the department's records, equipment, and manpower. In 1956, he was accused of being on "the verge of tyranny" by state assemblyman Anthony P. Savarese Jr. for refusing to turn over wiretapping data to a legislative committee.

On February 22, 1961, Kennedy informed Wagner that he would not accept another term as police commissioner unless the mayor agreed to approve pay raises for police officers. Wagner told Kennedy he could not commit to this and shortly after midnight, Kennedy announced his resignation. Later that morning, Wagner announced Michael J. Murphy as Kennedy's successor.

== Later life ==
Following his resignation, Kennedy was seen as a possible candidate in the 1961 New York City mayoral election. The Non-Partisan Party attempted to draft him as their candidate, obtaining 24,240 signatures for his nomination. On September 22, 1961, Kennedy announced he would not run for mayor, citing his wife's ill health.

In 1972, Kennedy moved to San Diego. He died there on October 17, 1978, from lung cancer.

Police appointments
Preceded by Francis W. H. Adams	New York City Police Commissioner; 1955–1961	Succeeded by Michael J. Murphy
