= John Jovino Gun Shop =

Firearms dealer in New York, 1911–2020

Coordinates: 40.719268°N 73.997697°W

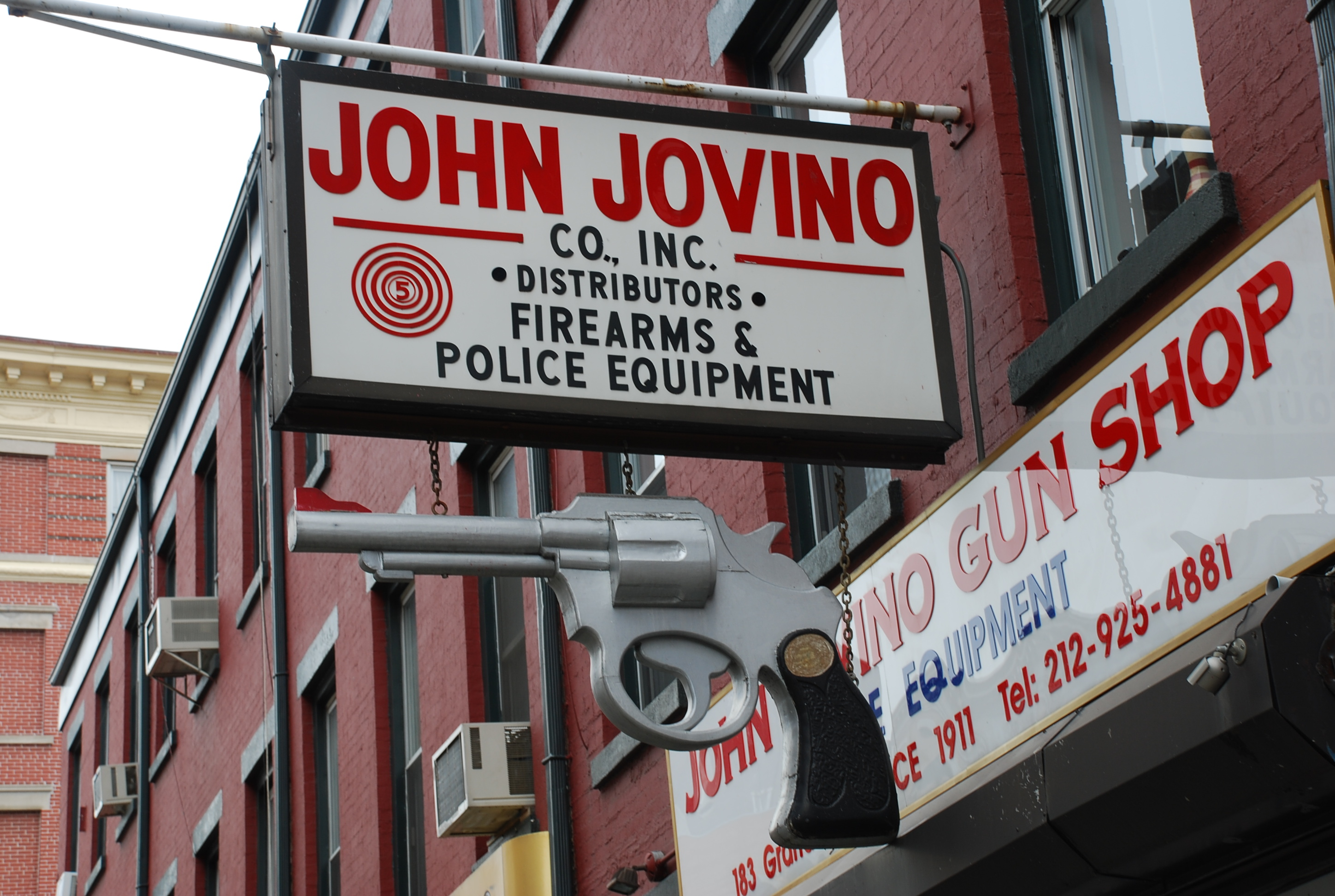
- Industry: Firearms dealer
- Founded: 1911; 115 years ago in New York, United States
- Founder: John Jovino
- Defunct: 2020
- Headquarters: New York, United States

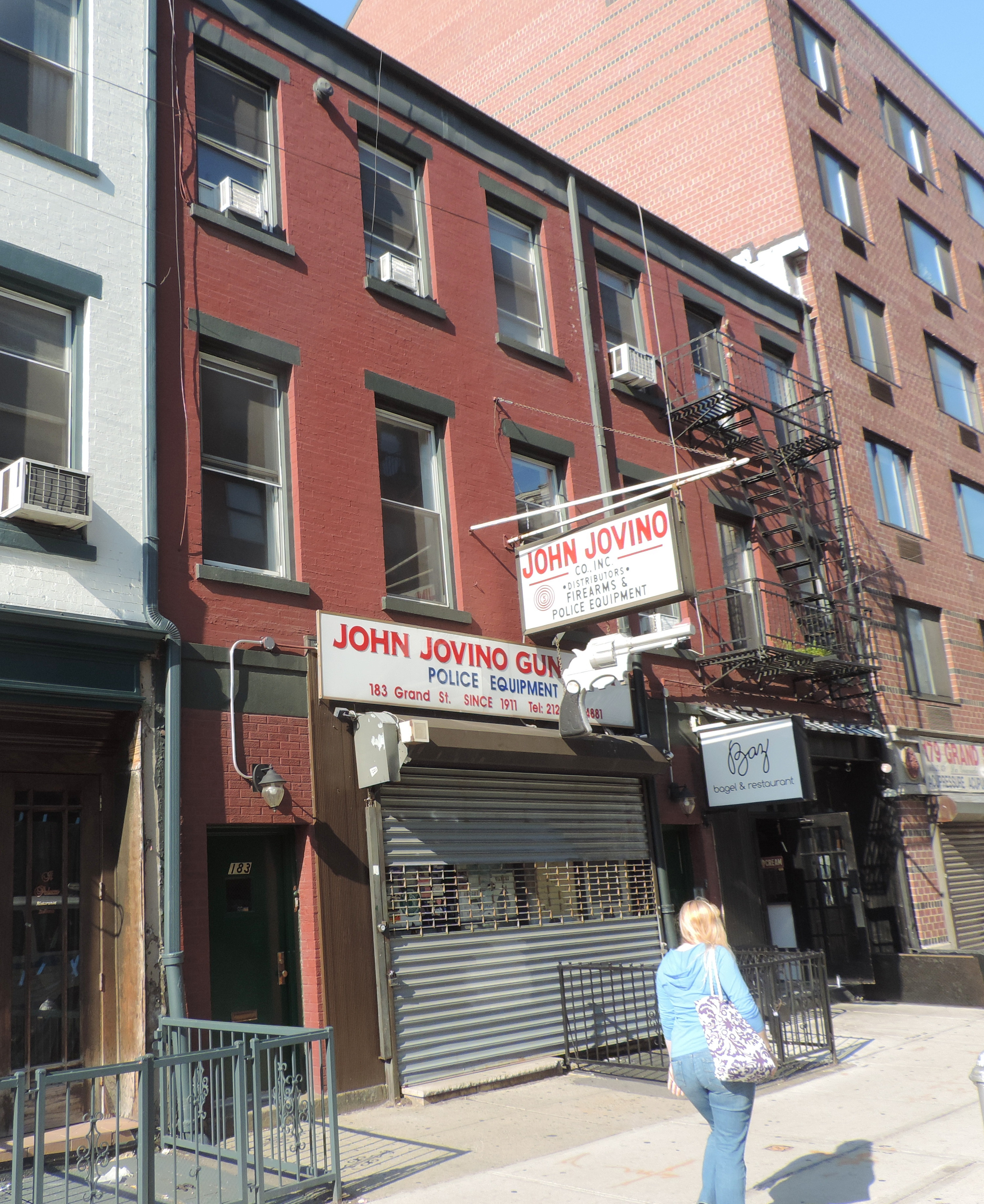
Shop

John Jovino Gun Shop, or the John Jovino Company, was a firearms dealer and factory at 183 Grand Street, in the Little Italy neighborhood of Manhattan in New York City. It was the oldest gun retailer in the city and said to be the oldest gun shop in the United States. The store closed as a result of financial hardships following the COVID-19 pandemic.

The store, which was known for its sign depicting a revolver, was founded in 1911 by John Jovino who sold it to the Imperato family in the 1920s. It remained in the family. The store was once located at 5 Centre Market Place, part of a gun district behind the New York City Police Department's former headquarters on Centre Street.

The store "does about $1 million worth of business annually", a figure which was higher before The NYPD opened an internal firearms bureau. The company used to own a gun factory in Brooklyn, the only one in the city, which made Colt M1911 pistols and reproductions of American Civil War-era Henry rifles. The company, known as Henry Repeating Arms, moved its headquarters from New York City to Bayonne, New Jersey, in 2013.

Although many of its customers are in law enforcement, the company was near the top of a list of sellers whose guns were linked to New York City crimes in a 2003 report by a Columbia University researcher using data from the Bureau of Alcohol, Tobacco and Firearms. Some 102 guns of 11,700 used in crimes and later identified came from the Jovino shop. According to current owners, until the 1980s the Jovino Company was "one of the biggest dealers in the country" and sold guns to many police departments. The study did not suggest any wrongdoing by the dealers listed (the store is not legally responsible for how people use the products they legally sell) and did not take into account that a store that has a higher volume of sales would most likely have a higher number of sales to people who later used the firearms in crimes, even if the store had a lower ratio of firearms used in crimes bought from the store per total sales than a store with a smaller volume of sales. A 2007 Village Voice article raised questions about the store's sales to United Nations diplomats from the Democratic Republic of Congo.

The shop was seen in the movie as well as the television series Serpico, in both season one, episode 13 ("A Death In The Family") and season 2, episode 5 ("Wedded Bliss") of Law & Order, very briefly in Mean Streets as well as The Brave One. The shop's Centre Market Street location was seen in the 1957 television series Decoy, appearing in the first season, episode four, titled "To Trap a Thief".
