= 71st Street station =

New York City Subway station in Brooklyn

71 Street
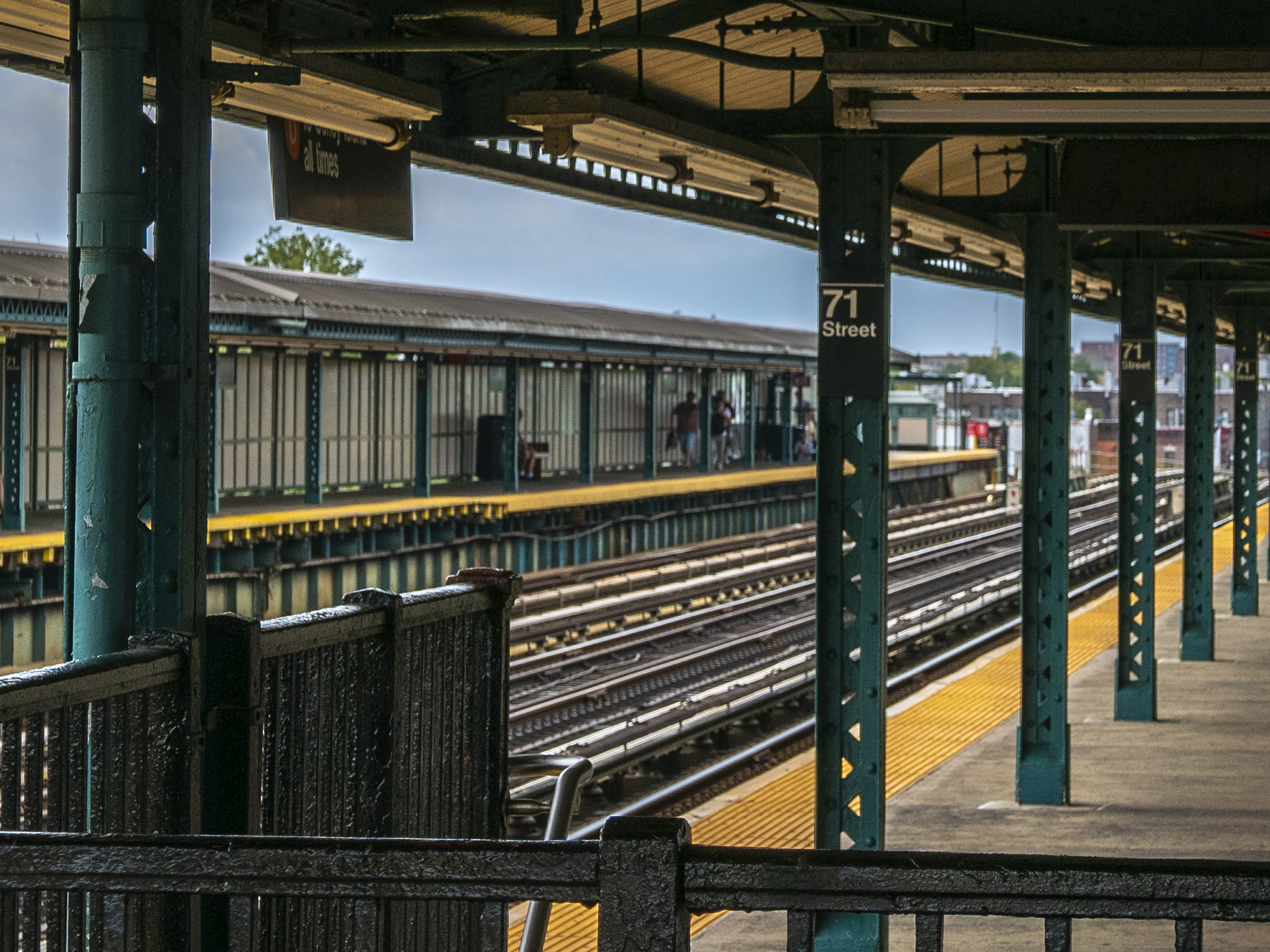
- View from southbound platform

Station statistics
- Address: 71st Street & New Utrecht Avenue; Brooklyn, New York
- Borough: Brooklyn
- Locale: Bensonhurst
- Coordinates: 40.619165°N 73.998992°W
- Division: B (BMT)
- Line: BMT West End Line
- Services: D (all times)
- Structure: Elevated
- Platforms: 2 side platforms
- Tracks: 3 (2 in regular service)

Other information
- Opened: June 24, 1916 (110 years ago)

Traffic
- 2025: 1,157,268 ▲4.6%
- Rank: 284 out of 423
Services
Preceding station	New York City Subway	Following station
62nd Street toward Norwood–205th Street	Local	79th Street toward Coney Island–Stillwell Avenue
and do not stop here
Location
Location within New York City Subway
Location within New York City
Location within New York
Track layout
Street map
Station service legend
Symbol	Description
Stops all times	Stops all times

The 71st Street station is a local station on the BMT West End Line of the New York City Subway, located at the intersection of 71st Street and New Utrecht Avenue in Bensonhurst, Brooklyn. It is served by the D train at all times.

== History ==
The 71st Street station opened on June 24, 1916 along with the first portion of the BMT West End Line from 36th Street on the BMT Fourth Avenue Line to 18th Avenue station. The line was originally a surface excursion railway to Coney Island, called the Brooklyn, Bath and Coney Island Railroad, which was established in 1862, but did not reach Coney Island until 1864. Under the Dual Contracts of 1913, an elevated line was built over New Utrecht Avenue, 86th Street and Stillwell Avenue. The section of the West End Line between 62nd Street and 18th Avenue originally opened with only one track in service. The second track between 62nd Street and 18th Avenue opened on July 8, 1916.

The platforms were extended in the 1950s to accommodate the current standard B Division train length of 615 feet (187 m).

In 2012, the station was rehabilitated with funding from the American Recovery and Reinvestment Act of 2009.

== Station layout ==
This elevated station has three tracks and two side platforms. The center express track is not normally used. Both platforms have beige windscreens along their entire lengths and brown canopies with green frames and support columns in the center. The station signs are in the standard black plates with white lettering.

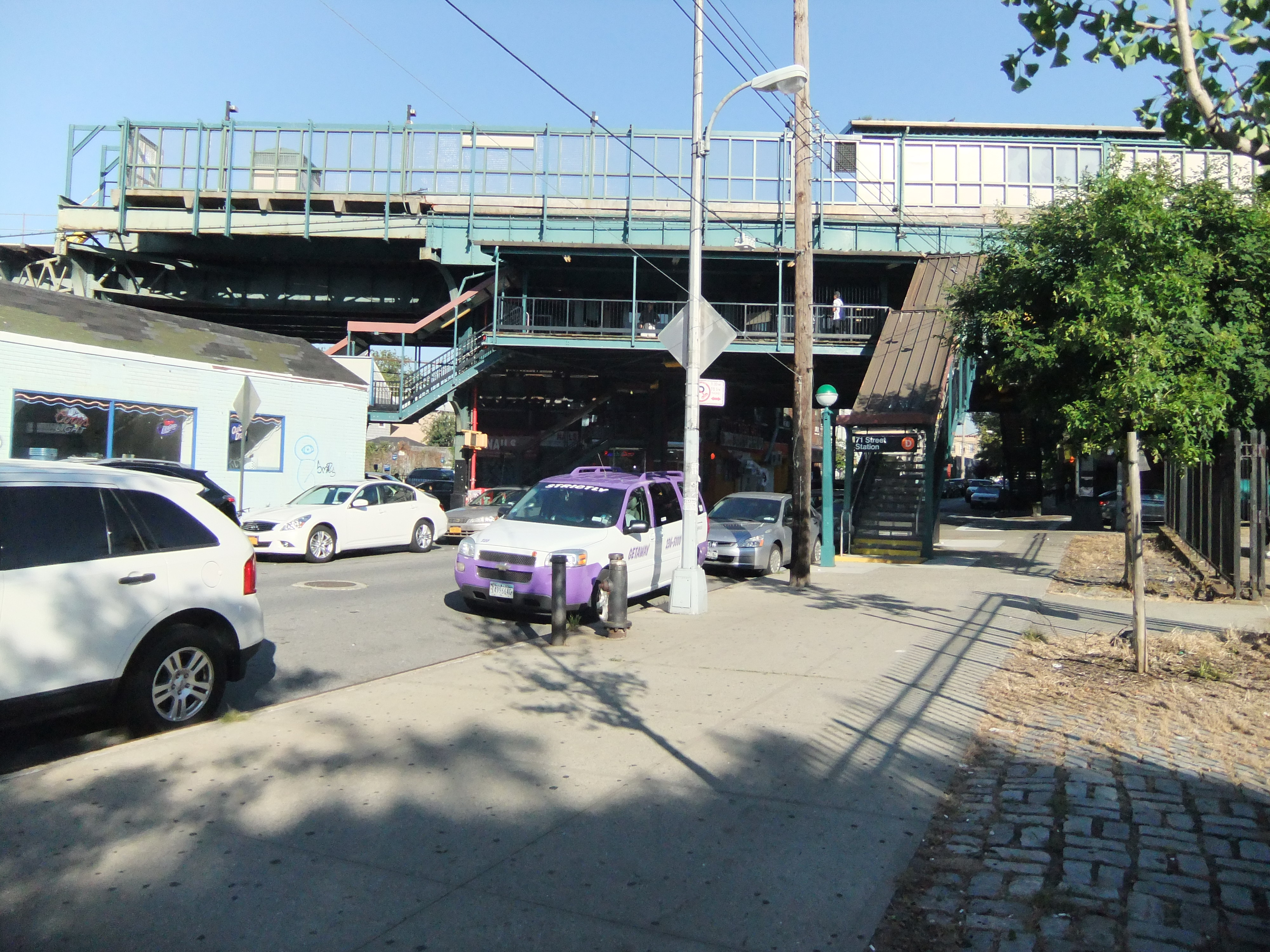
Eastern stairs

=== Exits ===
The station has two fare control areas, both of which are elevated station houses beneath the platforms and tracks. The full-time one is at the south end. A single staircase from each platform go down to a waiting area/crossunder, where a turnstile bank provides access to/from the system. Outside fare control, there is a token booth and four staircases going down to all corners of New Utrecht Avenue and 71st Street. The two southern staircases face south while the two northern ones face east or west.

The station's other fare control area towards the north end is un-staffed. A single staircase from each platform goes down to a landing around a now-closed station house. A single full height turnstile provides access to/from the station before another staircase goes down to either southern corners of New Utrecht Avenue and 69th Street. Nearby is the Lieutenant Joseph Petrosino Park.
