= Michael J. Murphy (police commissioner) =

American law enforcement officer (1913–1997)

- Born: Michael Joseph Murphy; July 19, 1913; Queens, New York, U.S.
- Died: May 18, 1997 (aged 83); Smithtown, New York, U.S.
- Police career
- Department: New York Police Department
- Service years: 1940–1965
- Rank: Commissioner

Michael Joseph Murphy (July 19, 1913 – May 18, 1997) was an American law enforcement officer who served as New York City Police Commissioner from 1961 to 1965.

== Early life ==
Murphy was born on July 19, 1913, in Queens. He graduated from Newtown High School and worked in insurance before going into law enforcement as a member of the New York State Police. After two years as a state trooper, Murphy returned to New York City as a court attendant. In 1941 he married Kathleen T. Flynn of Kings Park, New York. They had four children and resided in Elmhurst, Queens.

== Early career ==
Murphy joined the New York City Police Department on June 5, 1940. He was promoted to sergeant on June 8, 1945, the quickest promotion to that rank in the department's history. While working for the NYPD, Murphy earned a Bachelor of Science from the City College of New York’s School of Business Administration and a Bachelor of Laws degree from Brooklyn Law School. He was promoted to lieutenant in 1949 and captain in 1953. After his promotion to captain, Murphy was assigned to the commissioner’s office and served as a defense counsel during department trials. On April 30, 1954 he was promoted to deputy inspector and placed in charge of the police academy. That same year he established a relationship between the academy and City College and was named assistant dean for police studies at CCNY. On November 5, 1954 he was promoted to inspector. On November 28, 1955 he was named executive director of the New York-New Jersey Waterfront Commission. On February 26, 1959 he resigned from the commission to return to the NYPD as an assistant chief inspector and chief of staff. Nielson retired the following year and Murphy was promoted to his position. In 1961, Murphy earned his master's degree in public education from CCNY.

== Police commissioner ==
On February 22, 1961, Stephen P. Kennedy informed mayor Robert F. Wagner Jr. that he would not accept another term as police commissioner unless he agreed to approve pay raises for police officers. Wagner told Kennedy he could not commit to this and shortly after midnight, Kennedy announced his resignation. Later that morning, Wagner announced Murphy as Kennedy's successor.

Murphy led the department during the Harlem riot of 1964, which occurred after the shooting of a black youth by a white police lieutenant led to the. Murphy was criticized for his actions leading up to and during the riot, with Whitney Young stated that Murphy had shown not "elementary sensitivity" by not suspending the officer pending an investigation and civil rights groups disapproving of his orders for policeman to use live ammunition during the riot. The following year, the New York City Council began pushing for a civilian review board to review complaints against the department, a move Murphy vigorously opposed.

Murphy was also commissioner during the murder of Kitty Genovese. The murder did not receive much immediate media attention, however a remark from Murphy to New York Times metropolitan editor A. M. Rosenthal over lunch – Rosenthal later quoted Murphy as saying, "That Queens story is one for the books" – motivated the Times into publishing an investigative report. The case gained national attention when the Times alleged that 38 neighbors had witnessed the crime in progress but did nothing about it, even as Genovese screamed for help repeatedly (an account that has since been disputed).

On May 18, 1965, Murphy announced he would be leaving the department effective July 1 to become the president of the National Automobile Theft Bureau. He spent his later years in Smithtown, New York, where he died on May 18, 1997, at the age of 83.

Police appointments
Preceded by Stephen P. Kennedy	New York City Police Commissioner; 1961–1965	Succeeded by Vincent L. Broderick
