= 240 Centre Street =

Historic building in Manhattan, New York

- Former Police Headquarters Building
- U.S. National Register of Historic Places
- New York State Register of Historic Places
- New York City Landmark
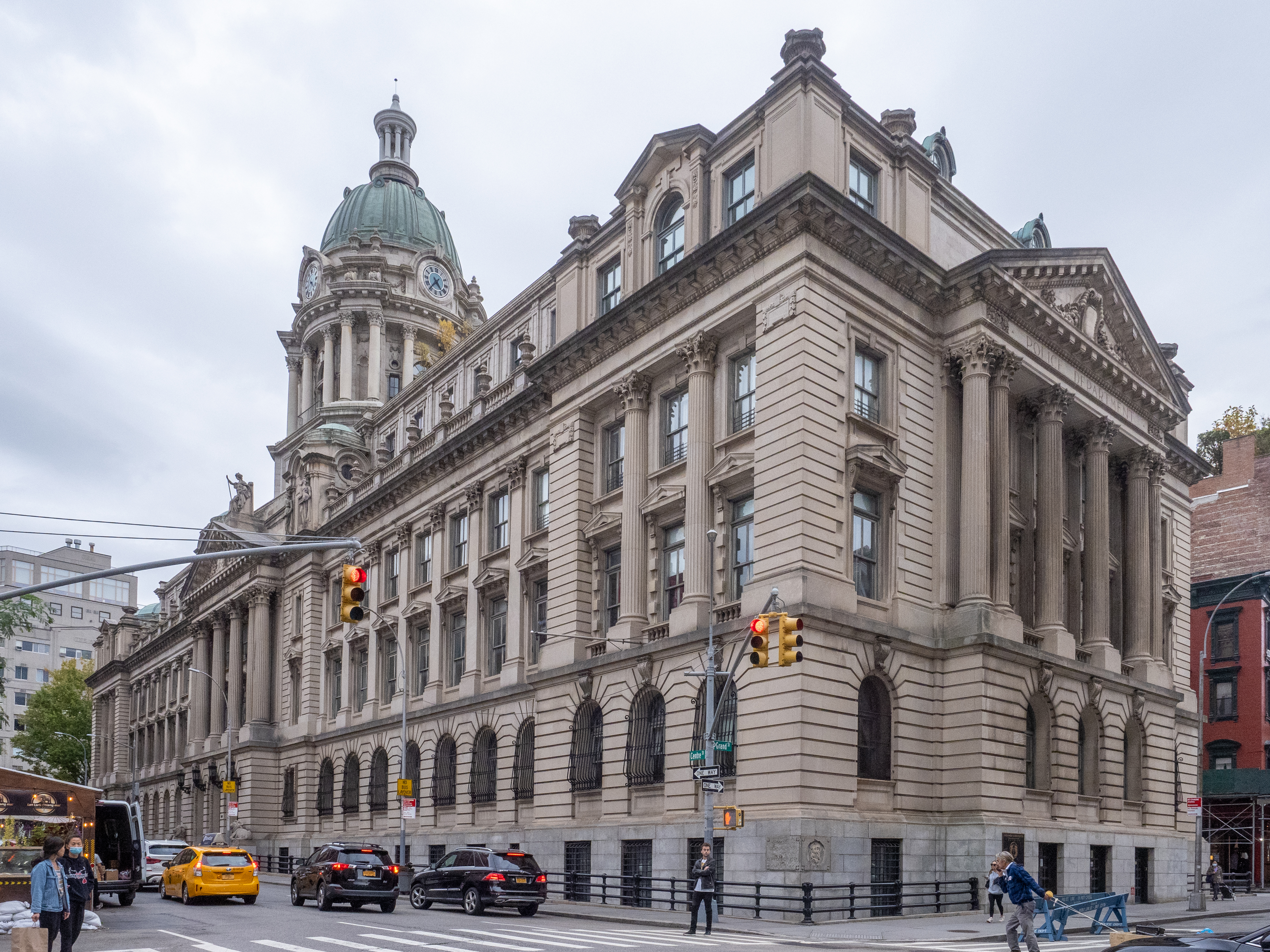
- Looking uptown from Grand Street (2021)

- Location within Lower Manhattan Location within New York City Location within New York Location within the United States
- Location: 240 Centre Street; Manhattan, New York, U.S.
- Coordinates: 40°43′12″N 73°59′53″W
- Built: 1905–1909
- Architect: Hoppin & Koen
- Architectural style: Beaux Arts; Edwardian Baroque; Renaissance Revival
- NRHP reference No.: 80002690
- NYSRHP No.: 06101.000609
- NYCL No.: 0999

Significant dates
- Added to NRHP: March 28, 1980
- Designated NYSRHP: June 23, 1980
- Designated NYCL: September 26, 1978

240 Centre Street, formerly the New York City Police Headquarters, is a building in the Little Italy neighborhood of Manhattan in New York City, United States. Designed by the firm Hoppin & Koen, it was the headquarters of the New York City Police Department (NYPD) from 1909 to 1973. Afterward, it was converted into a luxury residential building in 1988 by the firm Ehrenkranz Group & Eckstut, becoming the Police Building Apartments. 240 Centre Street occupies an entire city block between Centre Street to the west, Broome Street to the north, Centre Market Place to the east, and Grand Street to the south. It is a New York City designated landmark and on the National Register of Historic Places.

240 Centre Street was designed in a mixture of the Baroque and Renaissance Revival styles. The structure is clad in limestone and granite. The primary elevation of the facade is along Centre Street, where there is a central portico topped by a dome and flanked by two wings. There is also a porte-cochère to the north, a second portico to the south, and a second entrance to the east. Inside are five above-ground stories and two basement levels. The basements originally contained shooting ranges and mechanical rooms, while the first three stories were used almost exclusively as clerical offices. There was also an armory and drill room on the fourth floor and a telegraph center on the fifth floor. In the 1980s, when the building was converted into 56 (later 55) luxury apartments, the interiors were gutted and rebuilt. Most of the residential units are studio apartments and one- to four-bedroom apartments, and there is also some community space and retail space.

240 Centre Street replaced an older building nearby on Mulberry Street, which had been completed in 1862. Following the 1898 consolidation of the five boroughs into the City of Greater New York, the NYPD also expanded and needed a new headquarters building. Although a site on Centre Market Place was identified in 1903, construction did not begin for two years due to negotiations over funding and the building's location. After a further delay caused by the construction of a nearby subway line, 240 Centre Street formally opened on November 27, 1909. Over the subsequent years, there were several proposals to relocate the headquarters, and the NYPD moved some departments to a nearby building. The NYPD headquarters moved to One Police Plaza in 1973. As proposals for a cultural center and a luxury hotel fell through, the building was abandoned for a decade before being sold to Fourth Jeffersonian Associates in 1984. The structure was then converted into a residential building, a project that was completed in 1988.

== Site ==
240 Centre Street is in the Little Italy neighborhood of Manhattan in New York City, United States. It occupies an entire city block between Centre Street to the west, Broome Street to the north, Centre Market Place to the east, and Grand Street to the south. The land lot is quadrilateral and measures around 29,375 square feet (2,729 m^{2}). The Odd Fellows Hall is directly across Grand Street to the south, while the Stephen Van Rensselaer House on Mulberry Street is one block to the southeast. One block north is Petrosino Square, a public plaza dedicated to Joseph Petrosino, the New York City Police Department's (NYPD) first Italian speaker and an employee at 240 Centre Street.

The building's western frontage on Centre Street is 300 feet (91 m) long, while the eastern frontage on Centre Market Place is 311 feet (95 m) long. The site measures 88 feet (27 m) wide along Grand Street to the south, and 46 feet (14 m) wide on Broome Street to the north. Before the development of the present building at 240 Centre Street, the site was occupied by a public market called the Centre Market, which had operated there since 1817.

== Architecture ==
The building was designed by the firm Hoppin & Koen. After being converted into a luxury co-op building in 1988 by Ehrenkranz Group & Eckstut, it is known as the Police Building Apartments. When 240 Centre Street was built, a contemporary source described the building as being designed in a Grecian style. A writer for GQ magazine described the building as being designed in a mixture of the Baroque and Renaissance Revival styles. The New York Times and the New York Daily News likened the building's design to that of the Old Bailey courthouse in London. In designing the building, Francis L. V. Hoppin of Hoppin & Koen said the structure's design had taken inspiration from that of New York City Hall, rather than from other police buildings.

=== Facade ===
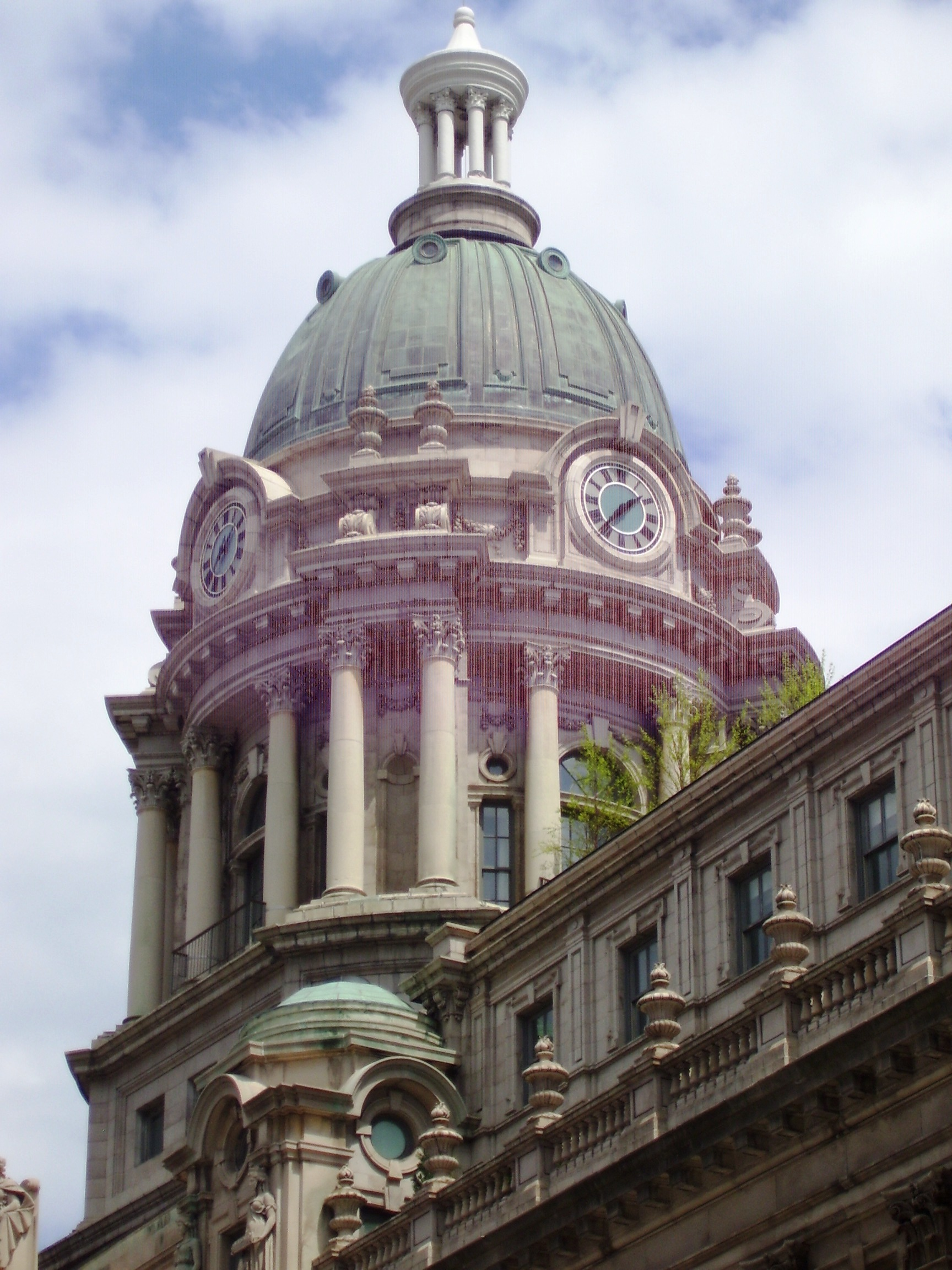
Dome

The structure is clad in limestone and granite. Originally, the first three stories and part of the fourth story were to be clad with Indiana limestone, while the basement was to be clad with granite. All the windows were replaced with double-glazed panels when the structure was renovated in the 1980s. The building is split into two wings by a central hall that is topped by a gilded dome and a cupola. Due to the uneven dimensions of the site, the southern wing is wider than the northern wing; however, the facades to the west and east are symmetrical. There are bas reliefs on three elevations of the facade.

==== Centre Street elevation ====
The main elevation of the facade is the Centre Street elevation, which is also the most ornately decorated. The center of the Centre Street elevation has a portico with fluted columns in the Corinthian order. The main entrance is flanked by a set of pillars, which are topped by figures measuring the five boroughs of New York City. The central figure, which represents Manhattan, is within the pedestal, just above the main doorway. The central figure is a personification of a woman holding a staff of authority in one hand and the scales of justice in the other. The Manhattan figure measures 12 feet (3.7 m) tall and was carved from one block of stone weighing 9 short tons (8.0 long tons; 8.2 t). The side figures, representing each of the four outer boroughs, hold tablets with the names of each borough. There are stone lions on either side of the entrance. The portico also has sconces and iron grilles.

Above the portico is a four-story cupola with clocks and a gilded dome. The dome is supported by pairs of columns, some of which protrude outward. Each of the clocks is set within oeils-de-boeuf (small rounded windows). The dome is topped by a lantern that rises 200 feet (61 m) above the ground. There are two private gardens adjacent to the dome; these gardens are private terraces for the apartment inside the dome.

The two wings extend off either side of the central portico. Above the wings, on either side of the dome, are Baroque-style towers with narrow windows. The rest of each wing has double-height pilasters in the Corinthian order, which divide the wings vertically into bays. There are pediments above the second-story windows, in addition to architraves above the third-story windows. There are a cornice and balustrade above the third story, and the fourth and fifth stories are placed behind a setback. At the end of either wing is a protruding pavilion with carved window surrounds, broken pediments, and a low dome.

==== Other elevations ====
The southern elevation on Grand Street has a portico, similar in design to the central portico on Centre Street. At the north end of the building was a private entrance for the New York City Police Commissioner, with an elevator leading straight to the commissioner's office. This entrance includes a French-style porte-cochère above a driveway, although the entrance was no longer frequently used by the 1960s. Above the northern entrance, the facade includes a single bay with a round arch, which in turn is flanked by Corinthian columns. The eastern elevation on Centre Market Place is similar in design to the western elevation, although the detailing there is flat. There is an entrance on Centre Market Place, which was used by prisoners.

=== Features ===
The building's original plans called for the superstructure to be made partially out of steel. Some 1,500 short tons (1,300 long tons; 1,400 t) of steel were used in the building's construction. There is about 114,000 square feet (10,600 m^{2}) of space, spanning five above-ground stories and two basement levels. Originally, the interior of 240 Centre Street was decorated in a green color scheme. The main entrance and first-story hall were made of Vermont marble, while the other stairs were made of cast iron. In addition, the spaces were decorated with white oak. As originally configured, the building had a large number of private elevators, stairways, and hallways to separate the public, police officers, and prisoners from each other. The original interiors were less elaborately decorated than the facade, except for the main entrance hall.

==== Police rooms ====
The original plans for the building included a shooting range in the sub-basement, with rifle ranges measuring 50 to 100 yards (46 to 91 m) long. As built, the sub-basement included two shooting ranges, in addition to an elevator room, coal storage, ventilation equipment, and batteries for the telegraph equipment. There were 31 jail cells in the basement, each measuring 6 by 10 feet (1.8 by 3.0 m) across. There were also a storage room and safes in the basement's northern section, while the southern section had a detectives' lounge with bathrooms, showers, and lockers. The property clerk's office and telegraph storage room were also located in the basement, and the NYPD's printing staff worked on that level as well. The basements also had space for a garage, where the commissioner's vehicle could be stored, and which was accessed from the Broome Street porte-cochère. There are rumors that a secret tunnel connected 240 Centre Street with the neighboring Onieal's Grand Street Restaurant; no trace of the tunnel exists within the building itself, but a dead-end passage under Centre Market Place exists within the restaurant.

The first three stories were used almost exclusively as clerical offices. The Centre Street entrance led down to the basement and up to a lobby on the first floor. The double-height entrance lobby had marble columns and a coffered ceiling, and chandeliers were suspended from the ceiling's coffers. To the south or right of the lobby was a reception room, a conference room, the homicide bureau, and the organized crime bureau. To the north or left were the information bureau, boiler squad, and chief inspectors' office. There was also an exhibit of seized drug paraphernalia on the first story. A grand staircase ascended from the entrance hall to the top floor.

The second floor contained the commissioner's office and bedroom, as well as offices for the commissioner's staff. The commissioner's office was accessed by an octagonal room with round-arched mirrors. The office itself measured 16 feet (4.9 m) tall and 16 by 22 feet (4.9 by 6.7 m) across and had dark oak paneling on the walls. There was a wooden fireplace mantel and wooden pilasters on the walls, in addition to doorways topped by segmentally-arched pediments. The office overlooked a roof garden above the porte-cochère, and it had a private stair leading to a third-floor courtroom. There were also record rooms, filing rooms, a theatrical bureau, a repair bureau, and a complaint clerk's office on the second floor. The third floor had the chief clerk's room, record rooms, a courtroom, and pension bureau. The courtroom, which had round-arched windows and fluted pilasters on the walls, was subsequently subdivided. There was also a police library on the third floor, in addition to the deputy commissioner's office, which was decorated with a Greek Revival–style fireplace.

The fourth floor was used as an armory and drill room, with a running track measuring 1/16 mile (330 ft; 100 m) long; a raised stage was located at one end. New recruits trained there before receiving further instruction at the NYPD's police school. On the fourth floor was a training room, draftsmen's quarters, photograph storeroom, chief surgeon's office, a waiting room, and a reservists' room. The fourth floor also included a lost children's room, which was adjacent to a playground above one of the wings. The fifth floor contained a measuring room, a telephone switchboard with hundreds of lines, a photograph gallery, and a "rogues' gallery". A telegraph system, which was used 24 hours a day, operated under the central dome, sending messages to other police precincts. There was also a 12,000-U.S.-gallon (45,000 L) water tank in the dome.

==== Apartments ====
In the 1980s, the building was converted into 56 luxury apartments. (Note: Some sources give an alternate figure of 54 units. The 56-unit figure includes 11 studio apartments, 41 one-to-four bedroom units, and 4 grand apartments.) Most of the units are studio apartments and one- to four-bedroom apartments ranging from 9,500 to 2,400 square feet (880 to 220 m^{2}). There are 11 studio apartments, each of which has high ceilings and a small mezzanine. In addition, there are 18 one-bedroom units, 16 two-bedroom units, 6 three-bedroom units, a single four-bedroom unit, and four "grand apartments". Some of the apartments are duplex units split across two stories. There is a communal area on the ground story. The building also has 13,000 square feet (1,200 m^{2}) of retail space in the basement, as well as 18,000 square feet (1,700 m^{2}) of space for community groups on the same story.

Because the NYPD offices could not be converted easily into apartments, the interiors were gutted and rebuilt when the residential conversion took place. Many of the original decorations were salvaged in the renovation, and all of the apartments have different layouts due to the building's shape. Several of the apartments have terraces or vaulted ceilings. The apartments generally have ceilings as high as 18 or 19 feet (5.5 or 5.8 m), though the units with vaulted ceilings are up to 30 feet (9.1 m) high. The apartments' bathrooms and kitchens have black-and-white tiled floors, and there are also mahogany moldings and rose-colored wallpaper. For the most part, the walls were repainted white during the residential conversion. In addition, the developers added soundproof walls and replaced the mechanical systems.

The grand apartments occupy the former commissioner's office, dome, gymnasium, and radio room; they have decorations that are not present in the other units, such as indoor balconies, vaults, and skylights. The apartment in the commissioner's office covers 4,200 square feet (390 m^{2}) and has a large terrace. The apartment in the dome is four stories tall, with four bedrooms, (Note: Also cited as three bedrooms) and has a private elevator. In addition to a 25-foot-tall (7.6 m) living room, the dome apartment has a lower level with two wings; four terraces on its third level; and a fourth level surrounded by the building's clocks. The dome apartment was combined with one of the other apartments in the 2000s. The apartment in the gymnasium, later redesigned by Charles Gwathmey, has a room measuring 60 by 40 by 25 feet (18.3 by 12.2 by 7.6 m) across, with three skylights. The radio room apartment has a ceiling with a shallow partial dome.

== History ==
The very first police office was established in 1642 at Stadt Huys, the town hall of the Dutch colony of New Amsterdam. The New York City Police Department was not established until 1845, following the Municipal Police Act of 1844. The legislation created precincts for each of the city's 17 wards, including a precinct headquartered at Centre Market in Little Italy, Manhattan, which was one of the NYPD's first police stations. The NYPD's original central office was at New York City Hall; the department's first standalone building was constructed at 300 Mulberry Street and opened in 1862. The Mulberry Street building was expanded in 1868 and again in 1869. Following the 1898 consolidation of the five boroughs into the City of Greater New York, the NYPD absorbed the outer boroughs' police departments and, as such, needed a new headquarters building.

=== Development ===
==== Site selection and design ====
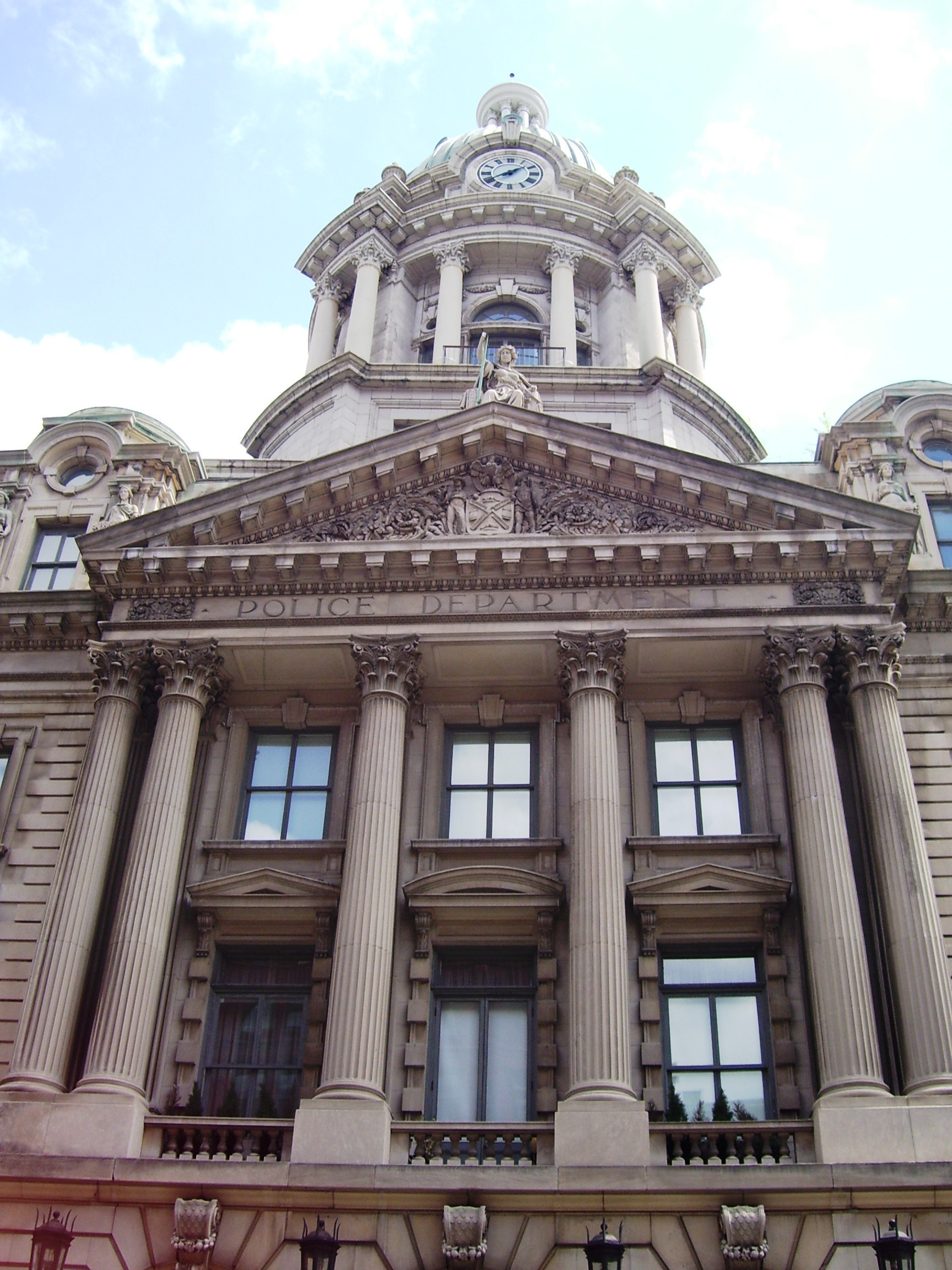
Pediment and columns over entrance

Eugene E. McLean, the chief engineer of the New York City Department of Finance, proposed closing five public markets in Manhattan in late 1902, including Centre Market. The city government already owned the site, and McLean suggested that the Centre Market site be converted into a location for a new police headquarters. At the time, Centre Market was described as having a "broken and dangerous" floor, and the market had only four remaining merchants. City controller Edward M. Grout suggested that the NYPD's Mulberry Street headquarters could be replaced with a playground after the new police headquarters at Centre Market was built. Jacob A. Cantor, the Manhattan borough president, suggested that the Centre Market site could be used to construct an annex to the existing police headquarters.

In July 1903, NYPD commissioner Francis Vinton Greene announced that he had hired Francis L. V. Hoppin of Hoppin & Koen to design a police headquarters at 240 Centre Street, on the Centre Market site. The original plans called for a six-story, Colonial–style stone-and-brick building covering an area of 380 by 75 feet (116 by 23 m). The New York City Board of Estimate initially would not give the NYPD an appropriation for the new headquarters, saying the city's Sinking Fund Commission had to approve the plans. That August, the Sinking Fund Commission granted its approval, allowing Greene to begin soliciting bids for the building's construction. Initially, the building was to cost $500,000, but the Finance Department engineer said the building's construction would cost more than the original estimate. That November, the Board of Estimate voted to issue $750,000 in corporate stock for the building. City alderman Timothy P. Sullivan opposed the appropriation because he wanted the headquarters to be built on Cooper Square instead. The city's Municipal Art Commission also approved the designs in December 1903.

By early 1904, the plans called for an English Renaissance-style building with a main entrance on Centre Street. Despite Sullivan's opposition, the Board of Estimate moved to issue stock for the building that February, and mayor George B. McClellan Jr. approved the stock issue the following month. Meanwhile, William McAdoo, who had taken over as the city's police commissioner that year, wanted to build the headquarters elsewhere. That March, McAdoo asked that the NYPD headquarters be built in Midtown Manhattan, preferably near Times Square, because the Midtown area had more police activity and crimes. He also wrote to McClellan, saying that the headquarters should be between 23rd and 60th streets in Midtown. McAdoo and McClellan toured alternative sites in Midtown that April, but the mayor was unconvinced that the headquarters should be moved. The Board of Estimate rejected McAdoo's alternate site suggestion in June 1904, directing the NYPD to instead construct the building at Centre Market.

==== Start of construction ====
McAdoo solicited bids for the NYPD headquarters' construction in July 1904, but all the bids he received were over budget. McAdoo requested an additional $65,000 for the building, but his request was denied, so McAdoo rejected all the existing bids. Contractors submitted revised bids that December, and the low bidder, Gillespie Brothers, proposed erecting the building for $630,000. McAdoo was about to award the contract when another bidder objected that Gillespie Bros. had ignored some of the contract specifications. Thus, the NYPD requested construction bids for the third time in January 1905, and Gillespie Bros. received the contract for the building and was paid $662,000. Levering & Garrigues received the structural steel subcontract, while Harris H. Uris received the ironwork contract.

Hoppin & Koen submitted plans for the headquarters to the Manhattan Bureau of Buildings that February, and the old Centre Market was almost completely demolished by the next month. A groundbreaking ceremony took place on May 6, 1905; at the time, the headquarters was projected to cost $700,000. According to several NYPD historians, a time capsule was buried under the cornerstone at the building's southwest corner, though a later owner questioned whether the capsule even existed. The city solicited bids for the building's stonework and ultimately selected the designs of an unidentified "young German". During the construction of the foundation, in August 1905, a water main burst and caused part of the retaining wall around the foundation to collapse; the burst was caused by the presence of quicksand at the site. In May 1906, the Board of Estimate approved another $15,000 for the headquarters' construction.

==== Delays and completion ====
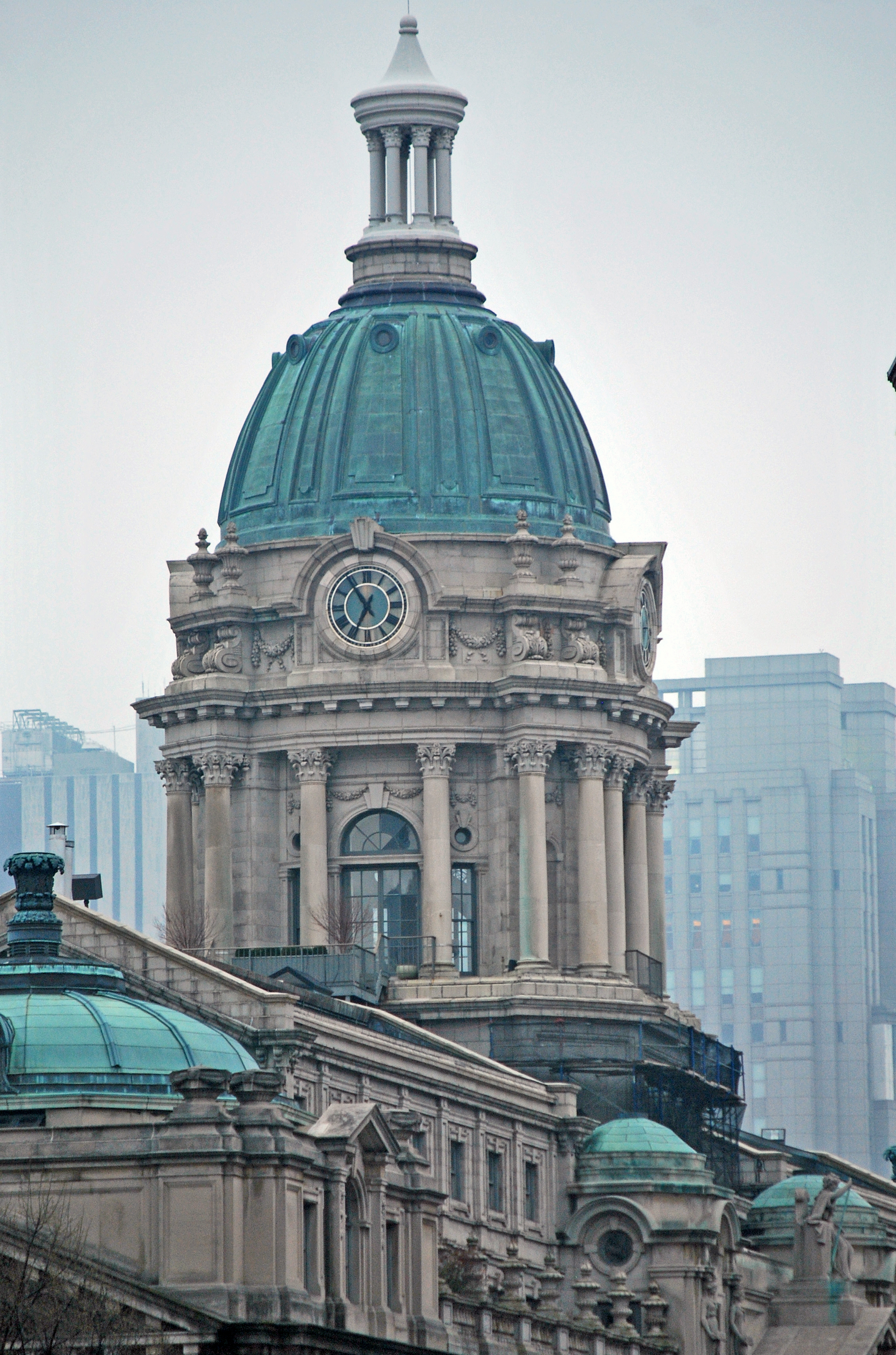
The cupola and dome

By the beginning of 1907, almost all of the exterior stonework was completed, and the interiors were complete enough that the plasterwork contract was nearly ready to be awarded. That July, the Municipal Art Commission approved the designs for the building's ironwork. The construction contractors installed all of the statuary on the building's facade without receiving approval from the Municipal Art Commission, but this discrepancy was not discovered until mid-1907. The commission ultimately rejected plans for two stone lions flanking the entrance, which had to be remodeled. The New York Times wrote that November that the building was complete except for the colonnade at its northern end.

Simultaneously, the New York City Subway's Centre Street Loop was being constructed on Centre Street, which prevented the contractors from completing the main entrance. The Gillespie Brothers claimed that the contractors for the Centre Street Loop were damaging the foundations as well. Because of these concerns, NYPD commissioner Theodore A. Bingham refused to relocate to the building until the damage was fixed. Gillespie Bros. filed for bankruptcy at the end of 1907, further delaying the building's completion. The company's creditors appointed a committee of three men to oversee the NYPD headquarters' completion. While the building was being completed in July 1908, the arch and roof of the Broome Street porte-cochère collapsed, causing either $8,000 or $10,000 in damage. An investigation found that the arch had collapsed because of displacement in the porte-cochère's wall.

Bingham requested $75,000 in mid-1908 to pay for the building's furnishings. Bingham also wanted $15,000 for a clock atop the building, which the city controller recommended that the Board of Estimate not fund. The Municipal Art Society announced in November 1908 that it would donate two bronze tablets, one on either side of the main entrance; these tablets were installed the next year. T. L. U. Hoppin of Hoppin & Koen also said that November that the new NYPD headquarters could be opened within two months if the city government paid the contractors $70,000. However, the building's opening was delayed once again in January 1909, as the main entrance, northern facade, and interiors were still incomplete. That April, Francis Hoppin said the contracts for the heating system and interior murals were about to be awarded. The Board of Aldermen appropriated $75,000 for furnishings in May 1909, and work on the heating and electric systems was underway by that September. Although Bingham's successor William Baker wanted permission to buy the furnishings without a public bidding process, the Board of Aldermen declined Baker's request, instead forcing him to acquire furnishings via a public bidding process.

=== Use as police headquarters ===
==== 1900s to 1920s ====
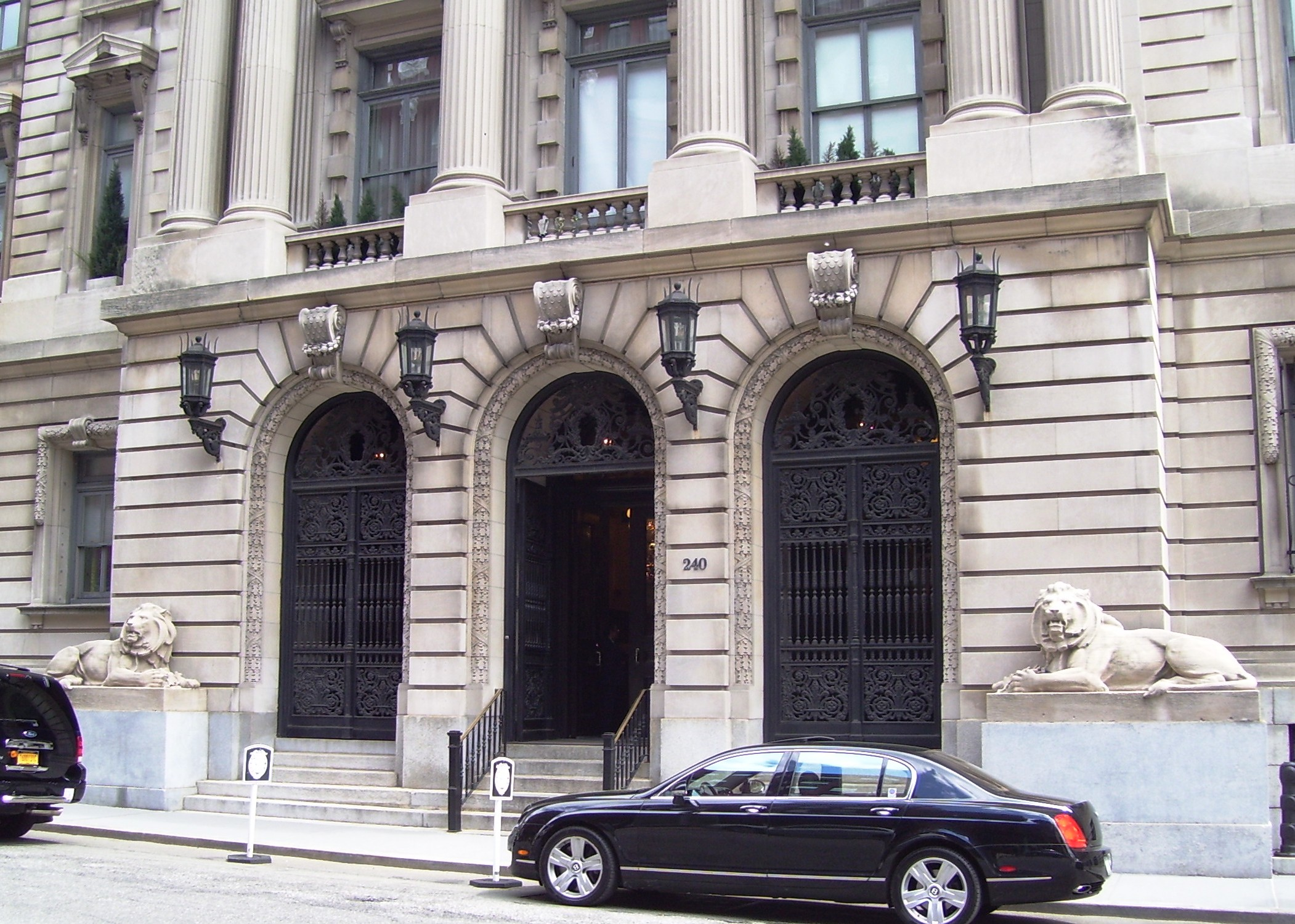
Entrance

The NYPD began relocating furniture, documents, and other objects into the new 240 Centre Street headquarters on November 24, 1909. The structure formally opened three days later, November 27, when the telegraph and phone lines in 240 Centre Street were activated. Over the following days, the NYPD also began moving its various bureaus to the new building. The first sixty prisoners were transported to the headquarters early that December. At that time, the city controller agreed to issue a $150,000 dividend to Gillespie Brothers' creditors. The opening of the new police headquarters allowed the NYPD to have all of its main divisions in one building for the first time. The NYPD also had a stable nearby at 136 Baxter Street, accompanying the headquarters. The city government retained 300 Mulberry Street for several more decades, using it as a courthouse. The Centre Street building attracted visiting policemen from San Francisco and London, and its presence prompted ten gun-store owners to move to Centre Market Place in the 20th century. A journalists' press office was established directly across Centre Market Place as well.

The NYPD began moving some of the offices from its Brooklyn borough headquarters to 240 Centre Street in 1911; the NYPD had moved everything out of the Brooklyn headquarters within two years. A "police hall of fame" was added to the building in May 1911, commemorating police officers who had died in the line of duty. The commemorative memorial tablets at the building's entrance were dedicated the next year. Subsequently, the NYPD hosted annual ceremonies at the headquarters, commemorate police officers who had been killed while on duty. The building was slightly damaged in 1915 after an anarchist detonated a bomb near the detectives' bureau. With the number of employees at the new headquarters increasing, police commissioner Richard Edward Enright requested $4 million in February 1924 for an annex immediately across Centre Market Place to the east. By then, there were 1,115 officers and civilian staff working at 240 Centre Street, and the NYPD had formed several additional divisions, which all had to share space. There was also a proposal to relocate the NYPD headquarters to Times Square, close to the city's largest nightlife district. Had this proposal succeeded, the existing headquarters would have been used by the New York City Board of Health.

A radio signaling system was installed at 240 Centre Street in 1926, permitting headquarters staff to alert other NYPD precincts of impending public-safety radio broadcasts. Proposals to relocate the headquarters were brought up again in 1929, when NYPD commissioner Grover Whalen requested funding to study the possibility of relocating the headquarters to Midtown Manhattan. Whalen claimed at the time that the Centre Street building "wastes thousands of hours of police time" because it was not centrally located, and that the NYPD's offices inside were so haphazardly scattered that they posed a fire hazard. The Board of Estimate also granted Whalen $250,000 to rent a Loft's candy factory at 400 Broome Street, just to the north, which would house some NYPD departments; the NYPD agreed to lease the factory for its police college the same December. Whalen requested $3 million from the Board of Estimate in 1930 for the acquisition of land for the new headquarters. Ultimately, the Wall Street Crash of 1929 forced these plans to be canceled.

==== 1930s to 1950s ====
In the 1930s, The New York Times described the NYPD headquarters as "really one of the quieter spots in New York"; its duties largely consisted of clerical work, police training, and prisoner lineups. Police officers regularly had suspects march across a stage as part of the lineup process. The NYPD's printing bureau and property clerk's office, which had been moved to the adjacent 400 Broome Street, was relocated back to 240 Centre Street in 1934 after the department vacated the Broome Street structure. Subsequently, the NYPD acquired 400 Broome Street and renovated it into an annex of the Centre Street police headquarters. After the renovations to the annex were complete in 1939, several of the NYPD's departments—including the emergency service, women's, records, and criminal identification bureaus—were moved from the Centre Street headquarters to the annex. In addition, the radio antenna atop the building's dome was replaced in 1938; the NYPD used the antenna to broadcast radio messages to other Manhattan precinct.

The NYPD dedicated a press building immediately to the east in 1940, which was intended to accommodate the police headquarters' press office. In addition, the NYPD's civilian-defense training center was originally headquartered at 240 Centre Street during World War II, though the training center was moved to 300 Mulberry Street in 1942. During this decade, the Centre Street headquarters also contained offices for the Police Athletic League of New York City. The NYPD's missing-persons bureau moved from 240 Centre Street to the annex in 1946 to make way for a planning bureau at 240 Centre. There were also plans to build a new headquarters in Manhattan's Civic Center, replacing 240 Centre Street. NYPD commissioner Arthur W. Wallander had requested that the New York City Planning Commission set aside the Collect Pond site for the new headquarters. The commission rejected Wallander's request in 1948, and nothing further came of the proposal. The building's antenna was again replaced in 1949, enabling the NYPD to broadcast radio messages from 240 Centre Street to anywhere else in the city. The next year, the NYPD began broadcasting messages between the headquarters building and police vehicles and helicopters.

The clock atop the building, which had stopped working during World War II, was also restored and re-illuminated in 1951. The idea of replacing the police headquarters was again discussed in 1954, when NYPD commissioner Francis W. H. Adams suggested relocating the headquarters to Midtown, citing the fact that the Centre Street building was becoming old and antiquated. The same year, Adams requested $380,000 for a television-broadcasting system at the Centre Street headquarters. Adams's successor, Stephen P. Kennedy, proposed constructing a new police headquarters in Lincoln Square between 64th and 65th streets, but that suggestion was scrapped following discussions with Robert Moses, who led the Lincoln Square development. Kennedy instead sought funding from the Board of Estimate in 1956, seeking to relocate the NYPD headquarters to First Avenue in Midtown Manhattan. He again requested funding for a new headquarters in 1958, asking the City Planning Commission for $1.197 million. The same year, the pistol range in the cellar was destroyed in a fire.

==== 1960s and 1970s ====
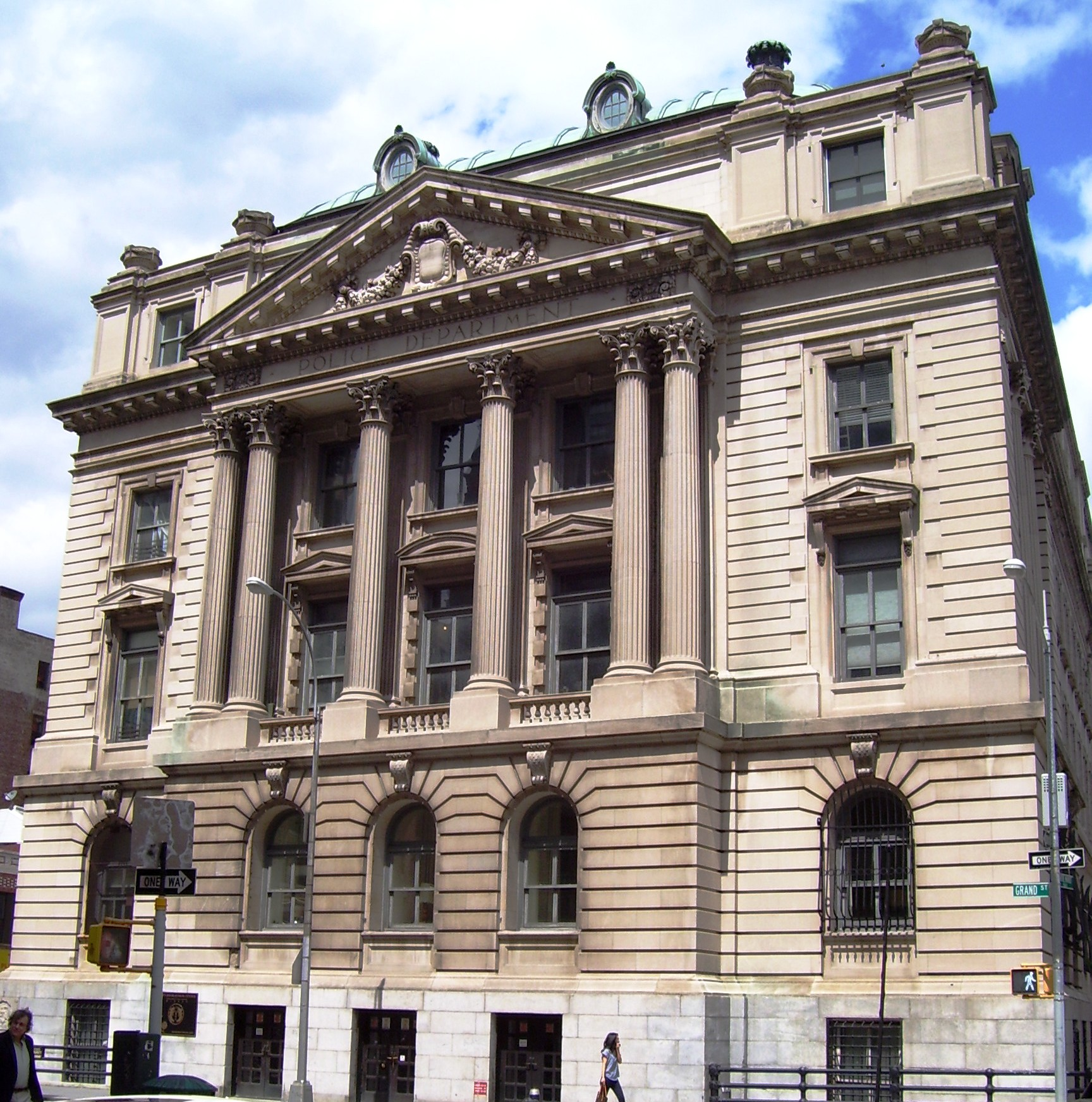
South facade

By 1960, Kennedy wanted to relocate the NYPD headquarters to Pearl and Madison streets in the Civic Center. The new site, which became One Police Plaza, received the City Planning Commission's approval in 1961, and the replacement headquarters itself was approved in 1963. By then, the New York Herald Tribune wrote that the NYPD officers had "grown to hate the headquarters' pretentious exterior [...] and its unlovely interior". The public frequented 240 Centre Street's "police boutique", where lost and stolen items were collected and auctioned off. Patrick Murphy, who served as the NYPD's deputy commissioner, described the building as lacking air-conditioning and relying on direct current for electricity.

The NYPD stopped using the police lineup room on the building's fourth floor in 1965. The NYPD also installed a fax system at the building in 1966, allowing officers to electronically check fingerprints against the New York State Identification and Intelligence System. During the late 1960s, the NYPD spent $1.3 million constructing a communications center in the building; the project involved replacing each borough's emergency telephone numbers with a single emergency line. The communications center was dedicated in July 1968, replacing the fourth-floor lineup room. After the NYPD installed an electronic computer system in the building's communications center in 1969, the building's dispatchers could send out patrol vehicles as soon as they received emergency calls. The same year, the NYPD spent $410,000 installing an electronic command post on the building's third floor, where closed-circuit television footage from cameras across the city was displayed.

In 1970, the building was bombed, injuring several people and damaging the community relations office and an elevator shaft; the militant group Weather Underground took credit for the bombing. The NYPD also began allowing the public to tour the building's communications center. NYPD staff began relocating to the new headquarters at One Police Plaza in September 1973, and the NYPD press office was moved the next month. The NYPD stopped using 240 Centre Street when One Police Plaza was dedicated on October 16, 1973. By then, the old building's facade was so decrepit that the building was surrounded by sidewalk sheds, which caught falling debris.

=== Attempted reuse ===
When the NYPD vacated 240 Centre Street, the city government had no immediate plan for the structure, which needed several million dollars in renovation. There was a suggestion to move the New York City Municipal Archives there, but New York City Council president Paul O'Dwyer was skeptical of the archive proposal. Over the following decade, there were two unsuccessful attempts to convert the building into a community center and a hotel.

==== Cultural center proposal ====
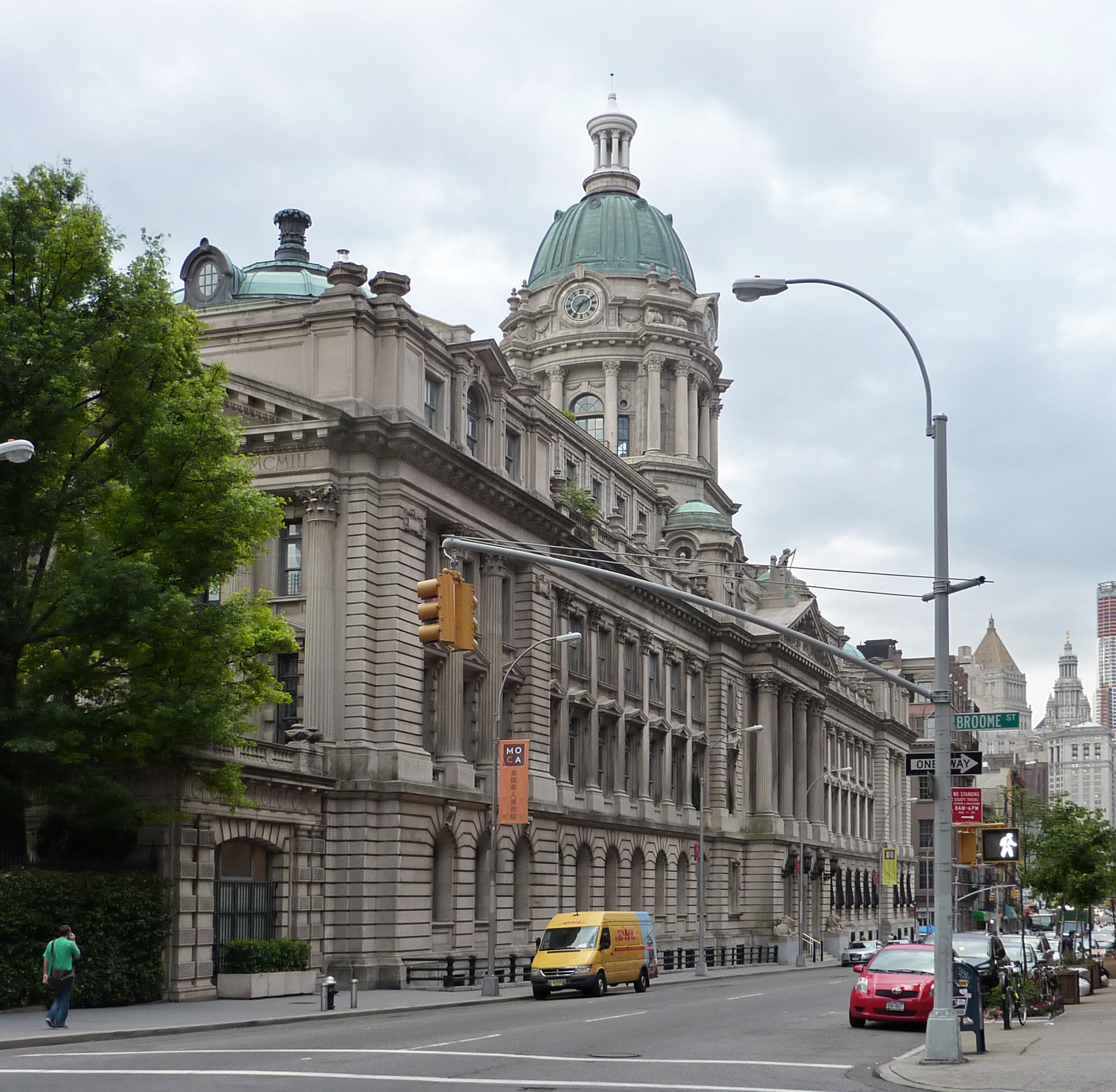
The building seen from Broome Street

By June 1974, the Little Italy Restoration Association (LIRA) proposed converting the old police headquarters into a cultural center for Italian Americans, given the building's location in Manhattan's Little Italy neighborhood. There also would have been a piazza next to the building. The cultural center was part of the Risorgimento ("resurgence") plan to preserve the neighborhood, which was announced that September; the local Italian community largely supported the plan. At the time, although the surrounding neighborhood was part of Little Italy, the area's Chinese population was expanding. The sculptor Louise Nevelson, the former U.S. first lady Jacqueline Kennedy Onassis, and community members formed the Save the Police Headquarters Committee to advocate for the cultural center. The National Endowment for the Arts funded a study into the possible reuse of the building.

The city government announced in August 1977 that it would lease 240 Centre Street to LIRA for a nominal fee of $1 a month. The association planned to raise $300,000 to convert 240 Centre Street into a cultural center, and LIRA launched a study on possible uses for the building. Initially, LIRA members disagreed on whether the cultural center should highlight only Italian culture or whether it should also showcase the neighborhood's Chinese, Hispanic, and Jewish populations. Sixteen rooms in one wing of 240 Centre Street were renovated and repainted, and the roof, railings, and two boilers were repainted. The roof terrace was converted to a dance room, while the commissioner's office became a bar. Oscar Ianello, LIRA's leader at the time, anticipated that the entire building would eventually contain community rooms, art studios, rehearsal space, and a swimming pool. In November 1977, the building reopened for a fundraiser, the first major event held there since the NYPD vacated 240 Centre Street.

Despite the plans to use 240 Centre Street as a cultural center, LIRA was unable to raise sufficient funds. Additionally, there were competing proposals to convert the building to commercial use instead. The city government regained control of the building in April 1980 and sent a request for proposals to hundreds of developers. The building could not be converted into a prison, casino, club, or discotheque, among other uses. Of the 200 respondents, only three had in-depth plans for the building, and only two of these three developers paid a deposit to have their plans reviewed. One of the two proposals called for the building to be converted into 51 apartments, while the other proposal would add 125 hotel rooms to the building. Meanwhile, the old police headquarters remained vacant, and thieves began taking copper, wood, pipes, and wires from the building. The presence of guards failed to deter trespassers, leading the city government to begin stationing attack dogs there in early 1981. Additionally, 240 Centre Street was still surrounded by scaffolding.

==== Hotel proposal and continued abandonment ====
By February 1981, the city government had tentatively selected a proposal by Canadian developer Trans-Nation Inc. to convert the building into a 125-room luxury hotel. Trans-Nation and the city government signed an agreement that October. As part of the agreement, Trans-Nation would spend $15 million converting the building into the Hotel de Ville, and it would pay the city $350,000 a year in rent, plus payments in lieu of taxes. The plans called for an atrium designed by Giorgio Cavaglieri, as well as rooms across four stories. Trans-Nation also had to restore the exterior and set aside at least 20,000 square feet (1,900 m^{2}) for the local community. There would have been a 230-seat movie theater, a second auditorium with 400 seats, and space for galleries and meetings. Had it been completed, the Hotel de Ville would have been one of the few hotels in Lower Manhattan, along with the Vista International.

A local firm, Sculpture in the Environment, was hired to renovate 240 Centre Street into a hotel. Renovations had still not commenced by early 1982, while Trans-Nation continued to negotiate with the city government. The building remained decrepit, as the areaway around it was filled with garbage, and there were homeless people and rats. Neighborhood residents complained about the stench, while business owners claimed that the garbage and vagrants were driving away business. The American Society for the Prevention of Cruelty to Animals found in late 1982 that four of the building's guard dogs also starved to death while the building lay abandoned. Trans-Nation reneged on its proposal to convert the building to a hotel in 1983, as the government of Canada had seized the company's assets.

=== Residential use ===
==== Sale and renovation ====
By September 1983, the city government was again seeking to lease out or sell the building. The city reviewed five proposals that November, each costing $1 million to $4 million. The city government estimated that 240 Centre Street would cost $10 million to renovate; the structure was extensively decaying, and most valuable metals had already been removed. In addition to restrictions on the site's usage, potential developers had to set aside space for community amenities, and 240 Centre Street could not be demolished or significantly altered without the New York City Landmarks Preservation Commission's (LPC) approval. Bill Lawrence, a former acting NYPD commissioner who toured the building, said the interior "was a total disaster", with nearly everything having been destroyed. After 240 Centre Street was sold, photographs and cold case documents from the building were discarded in the East River.

The city government sold the still-vacant building in April 1984 to Fourth Jeffersonian Associates for $4.4 million. The new owners planned to convert the structure into 60 apartments, which would have been either rental apartments or condominiums. Ultimately, the building became a housing cooperative. The conversion project, which was originally supposed to cost $11.5 million, would have to include a restaurant and a community center. The renovation was delayed for several months after Jeffersonian's employees looked at official city street maps and found that the building protruded past the boundaries of its land lot in every direction. The LPC would not allow the developers to modify the building, and the New York City Department of Buildings would not issue a construction permit unless the building conformed to its lot line; accordingly, the street maps had to be redrawn before renovations could start.

Ehrenkrantz Group & Eckstut was hired to renovate the building, while Lydia dePolo—who was married to Fourth Jefferson Associates' general partner, Arthur Emil—designed the interiors. Workers first cleaned out all of the former police offices. As part of the conversion, the interiors were gutted. Les Metalliers Champenois was hired to replace the copper on the roof and install three large vases on the exterior. The dome alone was covered with over 1 short ton (0.89 long tons; 0.91 t) of copper. To ensure that the renovation was historically accurate, the restoration contractors labeled each piece of decoration. Henry Smith-Miller and Laurie Hawkinson designed a two-bedroom model apartment for the building, which was shown to prospective residents; the model apartment included retractable tables, shelves, beds, and chairs. The renovation ultimately cost $30 million and was completed in 1988. It was one of several institutional or publicly owned buildings in New York City to be converted to luxury apartments, as well as one of several co-op or condo buildings around Little Italy.

==== Late 1980s and 1990s ====
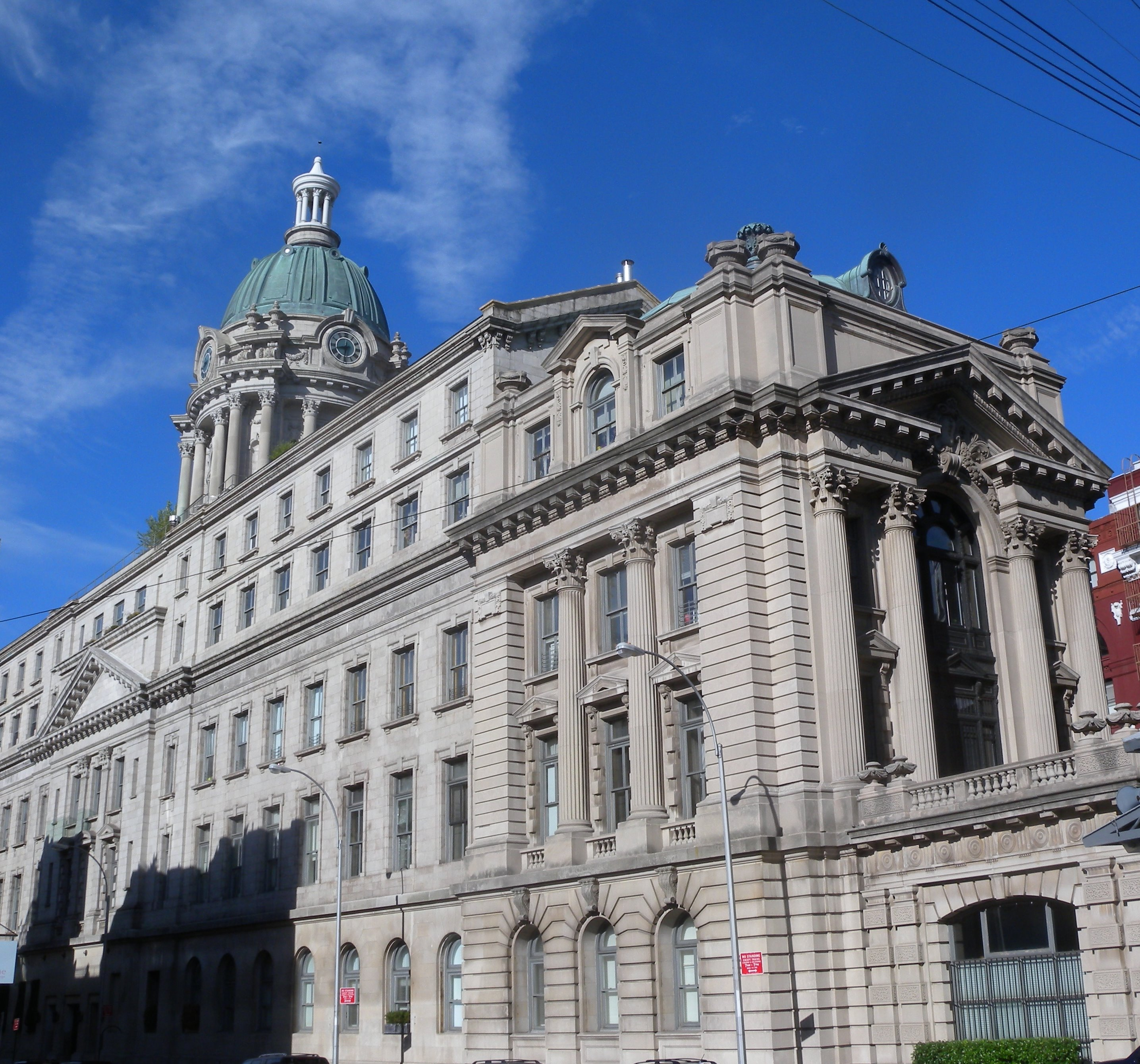
The building seen from Centre Market Place

When the renovation was completed, 240 Centre Street was rebranded as the Police Building, and the apartments were sold for up to $2.5 million each. By March 1988, at least 20 of the apartments had been sold, and Europeans comprised about half of the new apartments' owners. Though the neighborhood was characterized as "gritty", the building itself had begun to attract artistic tenants as well. Emil and dePolo took one of the largest apartments (the commissioners' office) for themselves, The publisher Jason Epstein and the film producer Daniel Melnick were among the first people to buy apartments there. A fitness studio called Radu opened at the building in 1989. After the renovation was completed, Ehrenkrantz Group & Eckstut received the City Club of New York's Albert S. Bard Award for architectural excellence in 1989, and the New York Landmarks Conservancy gave the building a "certificate of merit" the following year.

The Dime Savings Bank of New York moved to foreclose on 26 of the unsold apartments in 1992 after Fourth Jeffersonian Associates defaulted on $15.39 million in mortgage loans. Emil negotiated with the bank to prevent the apartments from being auctioned off. The following year, the city government took over ownership of the basement space after the developers failed to pay property taxes. Initially, the city government leased the basement space for $1 per month to the Organization of Independent Artists, which operated the Police Building Gallery there. Over the next three years, the gallery hosted works by more than 200 artists. In addition, more high-profile residents moved into 240 Centre Street, including the fashion designer Calvin Klein, the tennis player Steffi Graf, and the models Cindy Crawford, Christy Turlington, and Linda Evangelista.

By 1995, the city was looking to lease the basement to another tenant, since the city had to pay carrying charges of $10,000 a month for the basement; however, the city government did not pay these charges. A local senior center named Project Open Door announced plans to move into the basement that year, prompting protests from the building's residents, who did not want a senior center there. One member of the Police Building's co-op board claimed that the board had only learned of the plan when a resident saw a flier on a nearby street light. In response, City Council member Kathryn E. Freed suggested that the basement could be converted to a methadone clinic. The Organization of Independent Artists also opposed its eviction from the basement, saying that the space was better suited for an art gallery than for a senior center. The disputes over the senior center continued for several years, and the city government and the building's co-op board sued each other over the basement space in 1998. The co-op board claimed that the city government had delayed submitting plans for the site until May 1998, while supporters of Project Open Door claimed that the co-op board had been blocking the senior center from moving in.

==== 2000s to present ====
The city government continued to refuse to pay carrying charges on the basement space until 2000 when it agreed to pay back $957,000 in overdue charges; in exchange, the co-op board agreed to let Project Open Door move into the basement. As part of the agreement, the basement space could not contain a soup kitchen, and the senior center would have its own entrance. Project Open Door's existing building on Chrystie Street was to be converted into a soup kitchen. 240 Centre Street's co-op board began reviewing plans for the basement senior center in 2002. The senior center was still not open by 2005, in part because of delays rewiring the basement spaces. In addition, after Calvin Klein sold the dome apartment in the mid-2000s, that apartment was combined with an adjacent unit, reducing the total number of apartments to 55.

In advance of the 100th anniversary of the building's groundbreaking, in April 2005, the NYPD requested that the co-op board allow the police department to excavate the building's time capsule, but the board's president Arthur Emil denied the request. During the 21st century, the building continued to attract high-profile tenants including the photographers Gilles Bensimon and Antoine Verglas, the author Toni Morrison, the model Kelly Killoren Bensimon, and the film producer Megan Ellison.

== Impact ==
=== Reception ===
When the building was completed, the Brooklyn Eagle wrote that "the rooms of the commissioner remind one of the private office of a Wall Street banker, while the main staircase from the first floor would do justice to a first-class hotel". An article in the Architects' and Builders' Magazine said that the structure's architecture "would impress both officer and prisoner with the majesty of the law". During its time as a police headquarters, 240 Centre Street contrasted with the smaller buildings nearby, and the New York Daily News wrote that "it stood in graceful counterpoint to the neighborhood around it". By the 1960s, the New York Herald Tribune described the building negatively, saying: "The monstrosity in Centre St. has been described, perhaps charitably, as 'a mid-Victorian foxhole'". Conversely, Henry Hope Reed Jr. wrote for the same newspaper that the building's Centre Street portico and interiors gave a "palatial impression".

After the NYPD moved out of 240 Centre Street, a New York Times reporter described the structure as "one of New York's most interesting civic buildings", citing the clock tower, sculptures, and gates. Ada Louise Huxtable wrote for the Times in 1976 that the building was "a richly ornate classical fruitcake". After 240 Centre Street became a cultural center, a New York Times writer said that the building "fills its wedge-shaped plot with rare panache" and was a vestige of urban American architecture from before World War I.

A Newsday writer said in 1987 that the building's decorations were more appropriate for a cathedral than for a residential structure. When the residential conversion was completed, Paul Goldberger wrote that 240 Centre Street was "probably the grandest Manhattan apartment residence south of the Dakota" and that the new interiors complemented the original design without completely copying it. Mimi Sheraton, touring the structure in the late 1990s, wrote that it was hard for her to envision the building ever having been used as a police headquarters. By contrast, a writer for New York magazine regarded the lobby as having "the gloomy splendor of a government reception hall in Naples".

=== Landmark designations and media ===
In 1974, the LPC began considering designating the building as an official city landmark; the landmark status was endorsed by Nevelson and Onassis. The Police Building was designated a New York City landmark in 1978, and was listed on the National Register of Historic Places in 1980. The building has also been the subject of media works. The 1982 movie Q was filmed in the building's dome; a large nest, a prop from that movie, remained in the dome for several years. In 1988, the Fujisankei Communications Group created a short film inside the building to advertise the apartments there.

== See also ==
- List of New York City Designated Landmarks in Manhattan below 14th Street
- National Register of Historic Places listings in Manhattan below 14th Street
