= Centre Market Place =

Street in Manhattan, New York City

Coordinates: 40.7201°N 73.9977°W

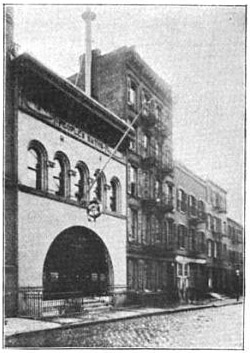
The People's Baths at 9 Centre Market Place circa 1890s

Centre Market Place is a one block long street in Lower Manhattan in New York City, between Grand Street to the south and Broome Street to the north. Mulberry Street is one block to the east, and Centre Street is one block to the west. Centre Market Place was originally an extension of Orange Street (now Baxter Street, which starts at Grand Street, where Centre Market Place ends), before being formally renamed Centre Market Place in April 1837, after Centre Market, which was west of the street. At one time, the street was at the top of a high hill. Local residents consider Centre Market Place to be part of the NoLIta neighborhood.

At the southern end of the street, on the corner of Grand Street, is Onieal's restaurant, which features a cavernous wine cellar that once served as a speakeasy during Prohibition. Gentlemen of means would walk through the front of the Police Building, perhaps make a contribution to the "widows and orphan fund" and then walk through the cellar corridor connecting the two buildings.

9 Centre Market Place was once the location to "The People's Bath House", a privately run public bathhouse built by the Association for Improving the Condition of the Poor. The People's Baths served as a model to which the City of New York would later build the city's truly public bathhouses.

The block also included several gun stores including the John Jovino at 5 Centre Market Place, and the older Frank Lava Gunsmith at 6 Centre Market Place. The gun stores were part of a gun district owing to its proximity to the police headquarters at 240 Centre Street.

A row of townhouses at No. 1, 2, 4, and 5 was rehabilitated by two developers, a husband-and-wife team, incorporating found architectural castoffs scavenged from around the world as part of its facade. Anthony Imperato, the founder and CEO of Henry Repeating Arms lived in the top floor apartment of 4 Centre Market Place, which was also known as the reporters shack.

The street was also home to many well-known writers, poets, and artists, including the noted crime photographer Weegee, who lived in a small studio apartment at 5 Centre Market Place.
