= The Shack (journalism) =

New York City police headquarters press office

The Shack is the informal name of the workspace for reporters who cover the New York City Police Department. As of 2024, it was a structure outside One Police Plaza, the department’s headquarters.

Reporters were first given space to work inside the department’s headquarters building in 1863: a basement space inside the headquarters on Mulberry Street. In 1875, police superintendent George W. Walling expelled the press from the building, saying they were too intrusive.

When the NYPD moved to its Beaux-Arts headquarters at 240 Centre Street in 1910, the press set up shop across the street in a tenement that may have been the first working space to bear the nickname. Among the reporters who worked there were Joe Cotter, David Halberstam, McCandlish Phillips, and Gay Talese.

In 1973, the NYPD moved into its new Brutalist headquarters in the Civic Center: One Police Plaza, where The Shack was installed in a second-floor office.Associated Press, New York Daily News, New York Post, The New York Times, Newsday, Staten Island Advance, El Diario, NY1 News and 1010 WINS were among newspapers and TV channels with access to the offices.

In April 2009, NYPD Commissioner Raymond W. Kelly said he would evict The Shack from Police Plaza by August to expand a command center, but reporters were ultimately allowed to stay in the building.

In December 2023, New York City Mayor Eric Adams announced that reporters would be moved from One Police Plaza into a trailer, a larger space said to be able to accommodate local and ethnic media outlets. Protests were lodged by The New York Times, New York Daily News, New York Post, Associated Press, Newsday, Gothamist/WNYC, and CBS, which said the move would reduce government transparency, and by the New York Press Club, which wrote that proximity to police officers is necessary for effective journalism. Nevertheless, The Shack was moved to a structure outside police headquarters in early 2024.

In early 2025, Police Commissioner Jessica Tisch had The Shack moved back inside the headquarters.
