= Lewis Joseph Valentine =

New York City Police Commissioner (1934-1945)

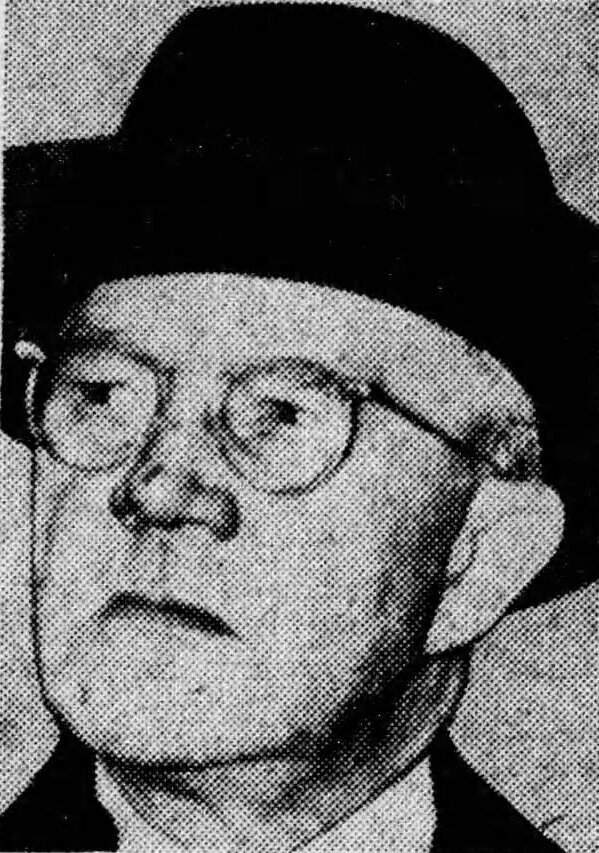

New York City Police Commissioner
- In office 1934–1945
- Appointed by: Fiorello H. LaGuardia
- Preceded by: John Francis O'Ryan
- Succeeded by: Arthur William Wallander

Personal details
- Born: March 19, 1882 Brooklyn, New York, U.S.
- Died: December 16, 1946 (aged 64) New York City, U.S.

Lewis Joseph Valentine (March 19, 1882 – December 16, 1946) was the New York City Police Commissioner from 1934 to 1945, under Mayor Fiorello H. LaGuardia during the Murder, Inc. era. He was the author of an autobiography, Night stick: The autobiography of Lewis J. Valentine. He was Police Commissioner of New York for eleven years, longer than any other previous person in that position. Time magazine credited him with cleaning up the department so that New York City had one of the most honest police departments in the nation.

After his tenure as New York Police Commissioner, he served in an advisory capacity for the Tokyo Police Force as it sought to rebuild and professionalize in the wake of WWII.

== Biography ==
He was born on March 19, 1882. Valentine joined the New York Police Department in 1903, at age 21. He specialized in combating police corruption; through these efforts, he attracted the attention of reformist Mayor LaGuardia, who appointed him as the city's police commissioner in 1934. He died on December 16, 1946.

== See also ==
- Tammany Hall

Police appointments
Preceded by John F. O'Ryan	NYPD Commissioner; 1934–1945	Succeeded by Albert O. Williams
