= 1 Police Plaza =

New York City police headquarters

One Police Plaza
- NYPD Headquarters
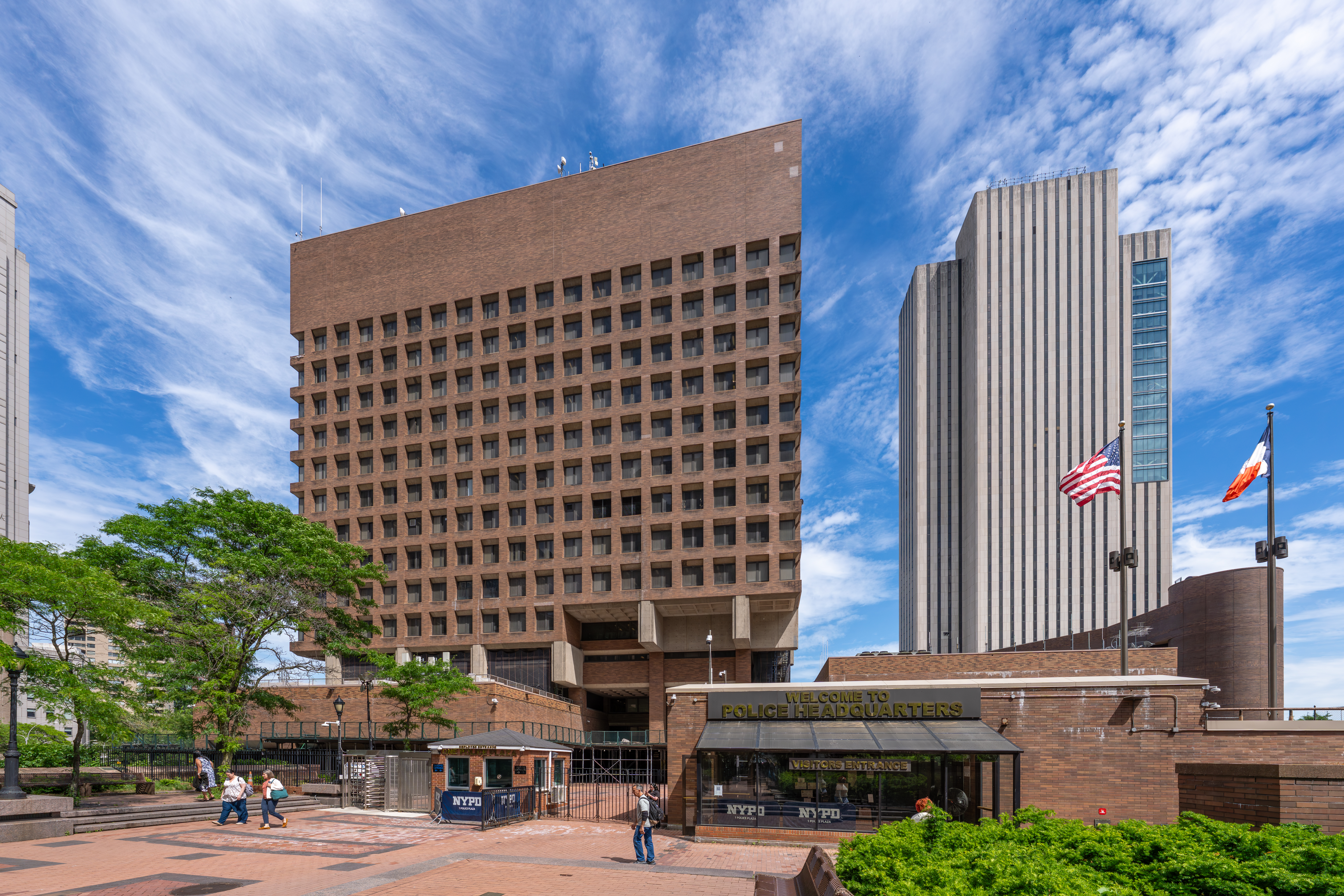
- 1 Police Plaza in 2026
- Alternative names: 1PP

General information
- Architectural style: Brutalist
- Location: New York City, New York, U.S.
- Coordinates: 40.712204°N 74.001676°W
- Current tenants: New York City Police Department
- Construction started: 1968
- Completed: 1973
- Inaugurated: October 16, 1973
- Renovated: 1984
- Cost: $58 million
- Owner: City of New York

Technical details
- Floor count: 14 (above ground)

Design and construction
- Architecture firm: Gruzen & Partners
- Main contractor: Castagna & Sons

One Police Plaza (often abbreviated as 1PP) is the headquarters of the New York City Police Department (NYPD). The building is located on Park Row in Civic Center, Manhattan, near New York City's City Hall and the Brooklyn Bridge. Its block borders Park Row, Pearl Street, and Police Plaza. 1PP replaced the NYPD's previous headquarters at 240 Centre Street, approximately 1 mile (1.6 km) north of 1 Police Plaza.

== Description ==
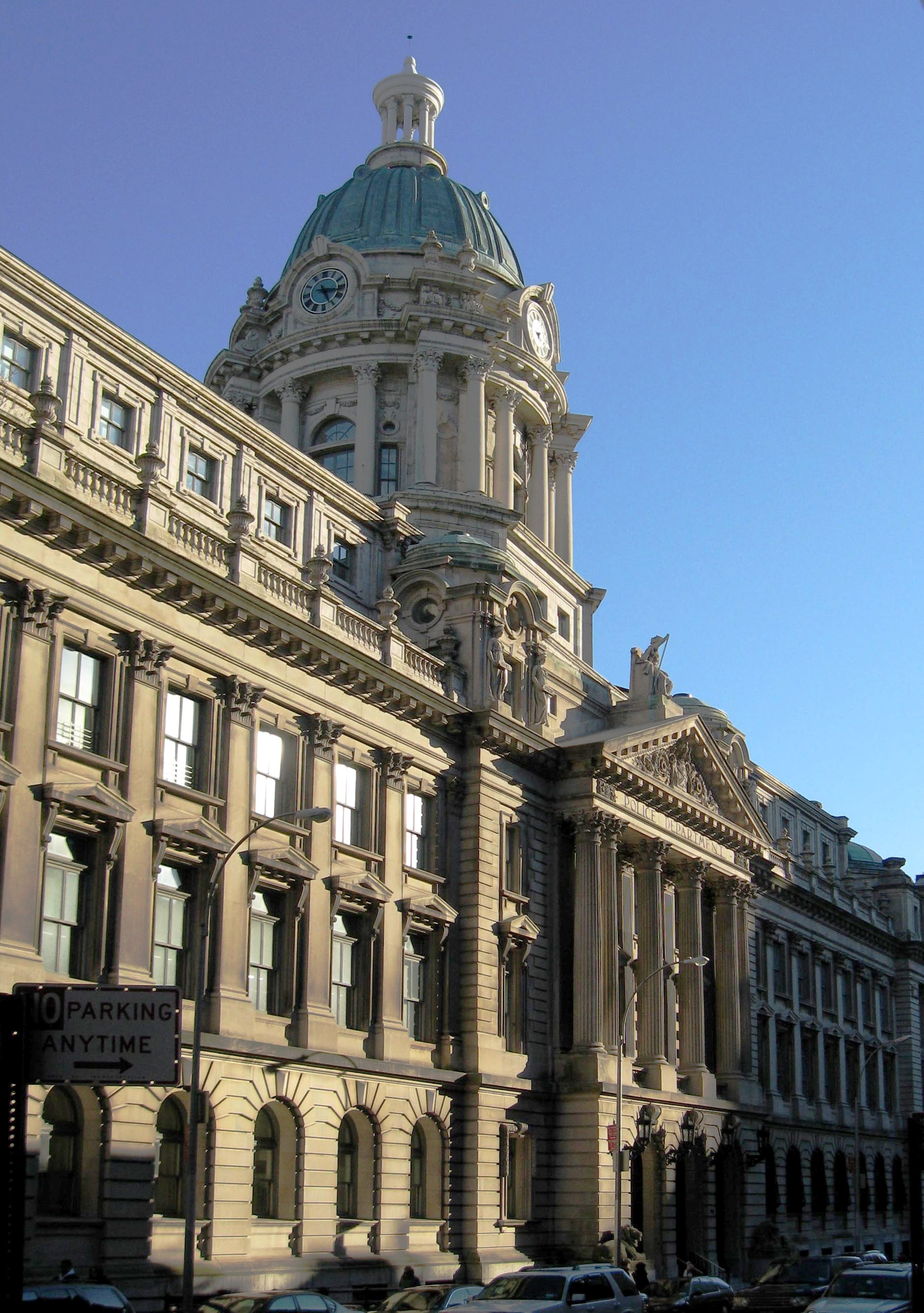
The NYPD's previous headquarters, at 240 Centre Street between Broome and Grand Streets

One Police Plaza is rectangular in plan and is an inverted pyramid in elevation. It is a 13-level, horizontally-oriented brutalist building designed by Gruzen and Partners. The building was dedicated on October 16, 1973. A 22,000-square-foot (2,000 m^{2}) expansion project was completed in 2011. Lower Manhattan residents held a rally on August 27, 2008 near One Police Plaza to protest the addition, and tenants of three neighboring co-ops filed a lawsuit to force the NYPD to undergo environmental and land use reviews.

Located on the second floor of One Police Plaza is the Real Time Crime Center, an anti-crime computer network which is essentially a large search engine and data warehouse operated by detectives to assist officers in the field with their investigations. The Major Case Squad and the Technical Assistance Response Unit (TARU) are also located at 1PP.

Inside 1 Police Plaza, a room on the second floor affectionately called "The Shack" served as the police bureau office for local press outlets until 2024 when it was moved to a structure outside the building. Its tenants include the Associated Press, the Daily News, New York Post, The New York Times, Newsday, Staten Island Advance, El Diario La Prensa, NY1 News, and WINS Radio. Its police counterpart is on the 13th floor, the office of the Deputy Commissioner of Public Information (DCPI). Also inside 1PP is the "Thirteenth Floor", the office of the New York City Police Commissioner.

== Park Row closure criticism ==
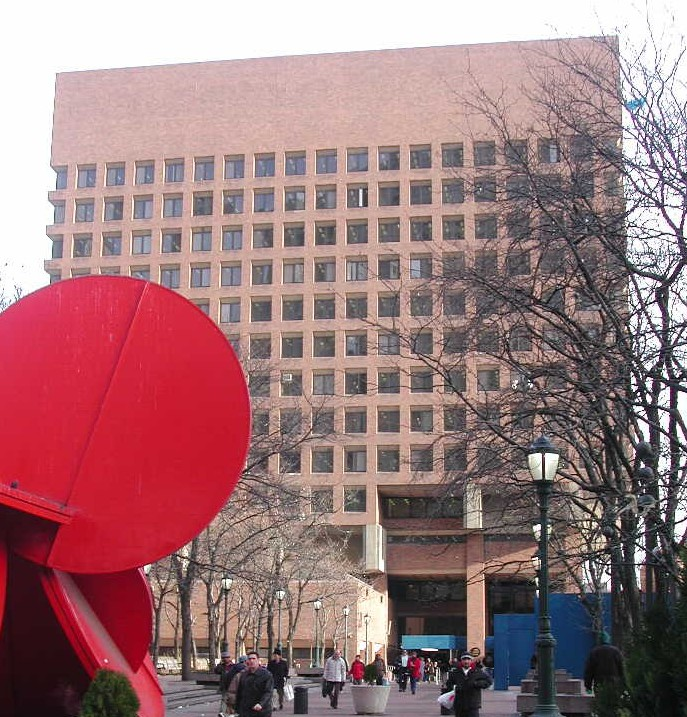
One Police Plaza showing Tony Rosenthal 5 in 1, 1973–74 (plop art) Cor-Ten Steel sculpture

Park Row, historically a major artery linking the Financial District to Chinatown and the Bowery, has been closed to public traffic since 2001. The NYPD asserts that this is necessary to protect its headquarters from a truck bomb attack. Chinatown residents were particularly frustrated at the disruption caused by the closure of the thoroughfare, especially nearby residents. People who live nearby argued that the police department had placed a chokehold on an entire neighborhood and that if One Police Plaza was such an obvious terrorist target, it should be moved from a residential area. Members of the Civic Center Residents Coalition fought the security perimeter around One Police Plaza for years. Park Row reopened for foot traffic and MTA buses in 2005, although only 200 buses per day were allowed on the street, and they had to pass through security checkpoints.

In 2007, the NYPD said that it would not be moving despite the numerous complaints from residents, explaining that they had tried to alleviate the impact of the security measures by forbidding officers from parking in nearby public spaces and by reopening a stairway that skirts the headquarters' south side and leads down to street level near the Brooklyn Bridge. The department also planned to redesign its guard booths and security barriers to make them more attractive, and was involved in efforts to convert two lanes of Park Row into a cycling and pedestrian greenway, which opened in June 2018.
