= Lieutenant Joseph Petrosino Park =

Public park in Brooklyn, New York

- (formerly Satellite Park)
- Location within New York City
- Type: Playground
- Location: New York City (Bensonhurst, Brooklyn), New York
- Coordinates: 40°37′9″N 73°59′54″W
- Area: 0.87 acres (0.352 ha; 0.001 sq mi)
- Elevation: 49 feet (15 m)
- Opened: May 24, 1935
- Founder: City of New York
- Etymology: Named after Lt. Joseph Petrosino, NYPD
- Operator: New York City Department of Parks & Recreation
- Open: All year 6:00 am – 1:00 am
- Designation: Playground as defined in New York City Charter Chapter 21
- Parking: Street parking
- Public transit: Subway: trains at 71st Street
- Website: www.nycgovparks.org/parks/josephpetrosinopark

Lieutenant Joseph Petrosino Park is a New York City public park located in Bensonhurst, Brooklyn, New York City between 70th Street to the north, 71st Street to the south, 16th Avenue to the east, and New Utrecht Avenue to the west. It is on the east side of the 71st Street subway station (D, R, and W trains). This part of Bensonhurst was within the Town of Nieuw Utrecht when it was founded during the Dutch colonial era in 1657. The town had its name Anglicized to New Utrecht during the English colonial era. The town lost its autonomous status and became part of the City of Brooklyn in 1894. Since 16th Avenue and New Utrecht Avenue do not run parallel to each other, the footprint of the park is trapezoidal in shape.

The land for the park was purchased by the City of New York in 1929, and the park was opened on May 24, 1935. It was originally called Satellite Park. When it opened, the park had handball courts, slides, swings, a wading pool, jungle gym, and a recreation building around its perimeter. A basketball court was later added on the southern side of the park extending from east to west. In 1993, the park underwent a $700,000 reconstruction. The handball courts, basketball court, and children's playground were renovated. The city installed new benches, fencing, lights and landscaping and improved the drainage. In 1999, the New York City Council renamed the park after Lt. Joseph Petrosino, NYPD.

Lt. Joseph Petrosino Park underwent a major renovation as part of New York City's Community Parks Initiative in 2019. The $4.5 million project, funded by the office of Mayor Bill de Blasio, included $355,000 from the NYC Department of Environmental Protection for green infrastructure.

Following the renovation, the park features new play areas for children, adult fitness equipment, basketball courts, handball courts and additional green spaces. Rain gardens and permeable pavement were installed to reduce stormwater runoff and improve the local environment.
