= William P. O'Brien (police commissioner) =

- Born: June 15, 1891; Greenpoint, Brooklyn, New York, U.S.
- Died: December 17, 1960 (aged 69); Hollis, Queens, New York, U.S.
- Police career
- Department: New York Police Department
- Service years: 1916–1950
- Rank: Commissioner

William P. O'Brien (June 15, 1891 – December 17, 1960) was an American law enforcement officer who served as New York City Police Commissioner from 1949 to 1950.

== Early life ==
O'Brien was born on June 15, 1891, in Greenpoint, Brooklyn. His parents had immigrated to New York from Ireland and his father was a New York City Police Department patrolman. Prior to becoming a police officer, O'Brien studied shorthand and typing and spent 8 years working in an office. During World War I he served in the Military Police Corps of the United States Army and was discharged with the rank of lieutenant.

== Early career ==
O'Brien joined the police department on May 4, 1916. He was promoted to sergeant in 1923, lieutenant in 1928, captain in 1937, deputy inspector in 1939, inspector in 1941, and deputy chief inspector in 1943. In 1946 he was promoted to assistant chief inspector and given command of the Manhattan West district, which was seen as the most important police district in the city. In 1948 he was named third deputy police commissioner.

== Commissioner ==
First deputy commissioner Thomas F. Mulligan died on January 23, 1949. O'Brien was chosen to succeed him and was sworn in on February 1, 1949. However, one day before O'Brien was to take office, commissioner Arthur W. Wallander announced his resignation, meaning that O'Brien would serve as acting commissioner while Wallander spent his final month in office on vacation then succeeded him on March 1.

On December 11, 1949, the Brooklyn Eagle published an exposé detailing police protection of bookmakers. Brooklyn District Attorney Miles F. McDonald launched a grand jury investigation and during an April 8, 1950, raid on a policy shop, McDonald's investigators found five plainclothes policemen and evidence of payoffs in the shop. Four months later, Mayor William O'Dwyer resigned. On September 15, 1950, MacDonald's men raided a $20 million betting syndicate and arrested bookmaker Harry Gross. After O’Brien was presented with wiretap evidence of Gross paying off police officers he announced the department would begin its own investigation into the matter. On September 24, 1950, acting mayor Vincent R. Impellitteri announced that O'Brien would be fired if he did not resign. The following day, O'Brien announced his resignation.

== Later life ==
O'Brien spent his later years working in real estate. In May 1952, Gross alleged that when O'Brien was a division commander in Brooklyn, the two had an arrangement that allowed Gross to operate as a bookmaker. O'Brien denied the accusation. He died on December 17, 1960, at his home in Hollis, Queens. He was 69 years old.

Police appointments
Preceded by Arthur W. Wallander	New York City Police Commissioner; 1949–1950	Succeeded by Thomas Francis Murphy
