= Jordan Gruzen =

American architect (1934–2015)

Jordan L. Gruzen
- Born: April 5, 1934; Jersey City, New Jersey
- Died: January 27, 2015 (aged 80); Manhattan
- Education: MIT School of Architecture and Planning, University of Pennsylvania
- Occupation: Architect
- Practice: Gruzen & Partners

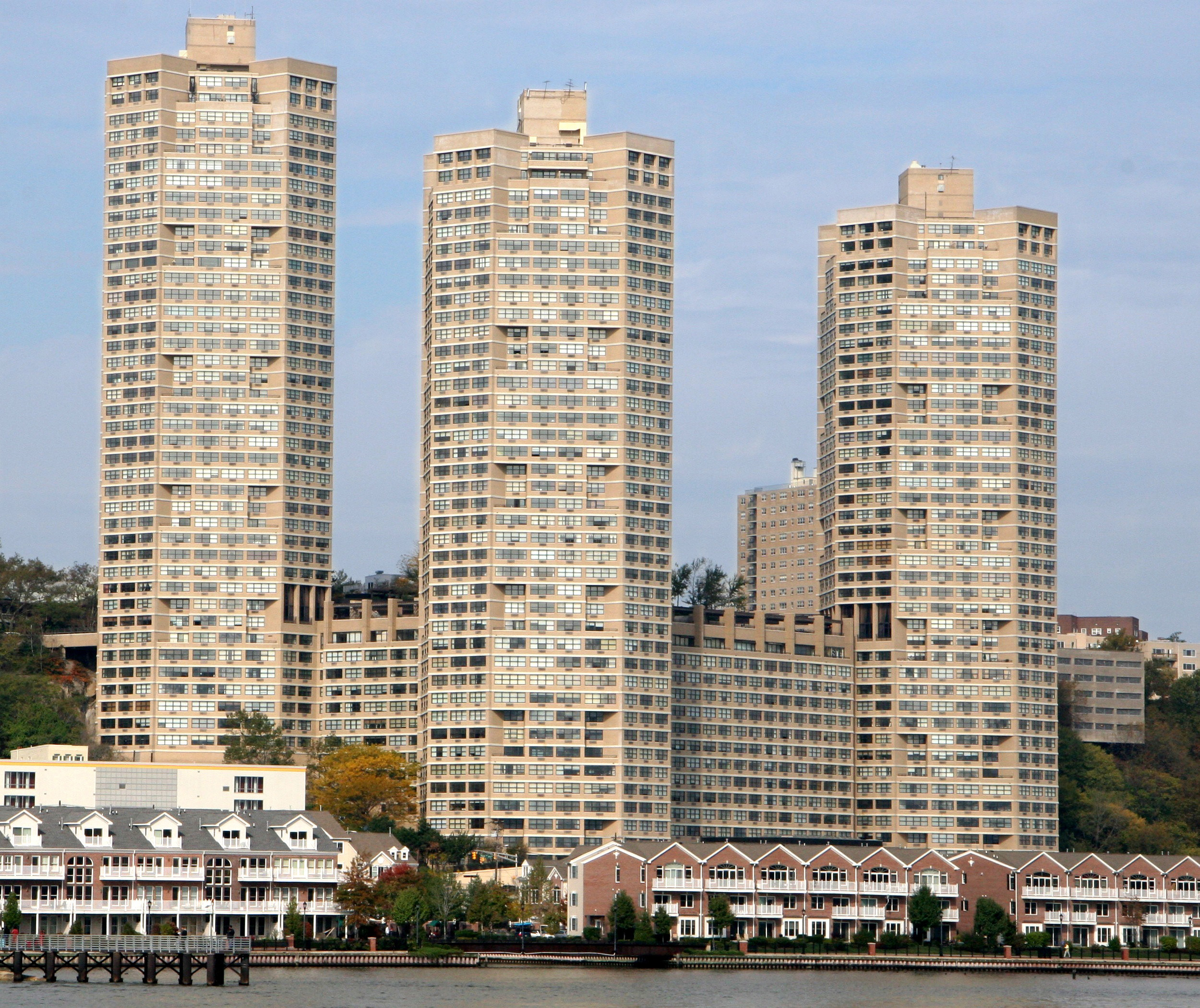
Galaxy Towers, Guttenberg, New Jersey, designed by Gruzen & Partners in 1976.

Jordan L. Gruzen (April 5, 1934 – January 27, 2015) was an American architect.

== Education and career ==
Gruzen was born in Jersey City, New Jersey, to B. Sumner Gruzen, an architect. He graduated from the MIT School of Architecture and Planning in 1957. He then attended the University of Pennsylvania, graduating with a Master of Architecture degree in 1961. He worked on projects around New York City. In 1962 he joined his father's firm, Kelly & Gruzen. In 1967 he and another associate, Peter Samton, became partners, and the firm was renamed Gruzen & Partners. After the death of the elder Gruzen it became the Gruzen Partnership, and later Gruzen Samton. The firm was acquired by IBI Group in 2009.

Gruzen died of bladder cancer in New York on January 27, 2015.
