= Petrosino Square =

Square in Manhattan, New York

Coordinates: 40°43′18″N 73°59′51″W

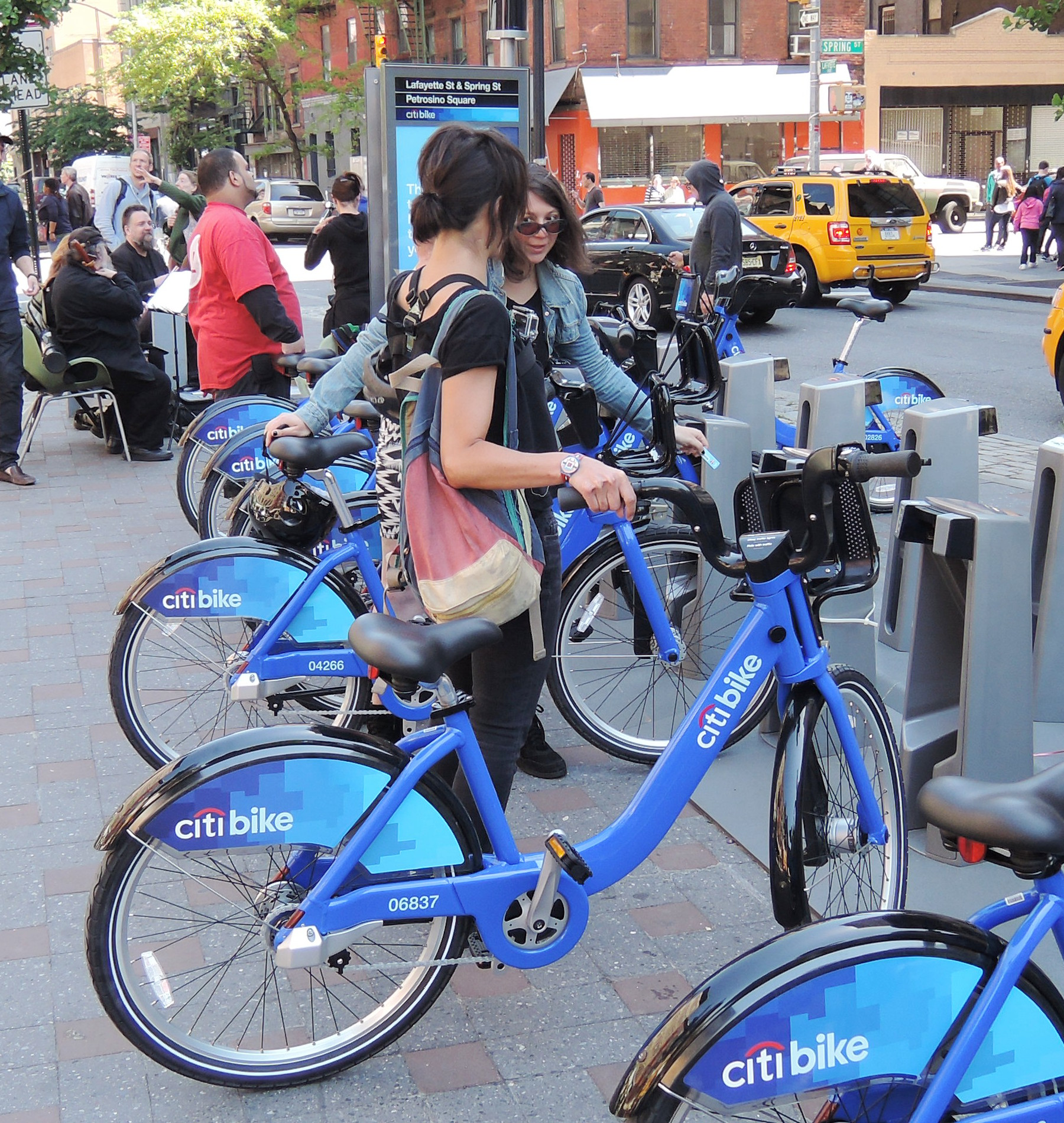
Bike share docking station on opening day

Lieutenant Joseph Petrosino Square is a small triangular park in Lower Manhattan in New York City, bounded by Cleveland Place, Lafayette and Kenmare Streets, two blocks north of the old police headquarters at 240 Centre Street, at the juncture of the Little Italy, Nolita, and SoHo. Formerly Kenmare Square, it was renamed in 1987 in honor of Lieutenant Joseph Petrosino, an early 20th century NYPD official dedicated to investigating and combating, among other adversaries, the Black Hand, an early version of the Mafia in America.

The park underwent a $2 million renovation in 2008–2011 and is the site of a Citi Bike docking station.
