= Arthur W. Wallander =

Arthur William Wallander, Sr.
- Wallander circa 1945-1950

New York City Police Commissioner
- In office 1945–1949
- Appointed by: Fiorello H. LaGuardia
- Preceded by: Lewis Joseph Valentine
- Succeeded by: William P. O'Brien

Personal details
- Born: February 3, 1892
- Died: November 3, 1980 (aged 88) Putnam-Weaver Nursing Home; Greenwich, Connecticut, U.S.

Arthur William Wallander, Sr. (February 3, 1892 - November 3, 1980) was New York City Police Commissioner from 1945 to 1949. He was the only Police Commissioner to be retained by an incoming Mayor of New York City.

== Biography ==
He was born on February 3, 1892, in New York City to Eva Wallander of Sweden. He had a sister, Fanny I. Wallander. He was appointed as New York City Police Commissioner by Fiorello H. LaGuardia in 1945 and was asked to remain in office by William O'Dwyer when O'Dwyer became mayor. O'Dwyer had been trained by Wallander at the New York City Police Academy.

He died on November 3, 1980, at the Putnam-Weaver Nursing Home in Greenwich, Connecticut.

Police appointments
Preceded by Albert O. Williams	NYPD Commissioner; 1945–1949	Succeeded by William P. O'Brien
