= Political party strength in New York City =

Politics in the US city

The following table indicates the party of elected officials in the U.S. City of New York, New York since the modern five-borough city was created in 1898:

- Mayor
- President of the New York City Council/New York City Public Advocate (after 1993)
- Comptroller

The table also indicates the historical party composition in the:

- 5 Borough Presidencies
- New York City Council

Year	Citywide offices					Borough presidents	City Council	
Year	Mayor	President of the Board of Aldermen	President of the City Council	Public Advocate	Comptroller	Borough presidents	Speaker	Composition
1898	Robert Anderson Van Wyck (D)	Randolph Guggenheimer (D)	no such office	no such office	Bird Sim Coler (D)	4D, 1R	no such office	Council: 15T, 10D, 3R; Aldermen: 46D, 10R, 3CU
1899	Robert Anderson Van Wyck (D)	Randolph Guggenheimer (D)	no such office	no such office	Bird Sim Coler (D)	4D, 1R	no such office	Council: 15T, 10D, 3R; Aldermen: 46D, 10R, 3CU
1900	Robert Anderson Van Wyck (D)	Randolph Guggenheimer (D)	no such office	no such office	Bird Sim Coler (D)	4D, 1R	no such office	43D, 16R
1901	Robert Anderson Van Wyck (D)	Randolph Guggenheimer (D)	no such office	no such office	Bird Sim Coler (D)	4D, 1R	no such office	43D, 16R
1902	Seth Low (Fus)	Charles V. Fornes (D)	no such office	no such office	Edward M. Grout (D)	3D, 1R, 1Fus	no such office	38R, 35D
1903	Seth Low (Fus)	Charles V. Fornes (D)	no such office	no such office	Edward M. Grout (D)	3D, 1R, 1Fus	no such office	38R, 35D
1904	George B. McClellan Jr. (D)	Charles V. Fornes (D)	no such office	no such office	Edward M. Grout (D)	4D, 1R	no such office	48D, 25R
1905	George B. McClellan Jr. (D)	Charles V. Fornes (D)	no such office	no such office	Edward M. Grout (D)	4D, 1R	no such office	48D, 25R
1906	George B. McClellan Jr. (D)	Herman A. Metz (D)	no such office	no such office	Patrick McGowan (D)	3D, 1R, 1MOL	no such office	43R, 24D, 6MOL
1907	George B. McClellan Jr. (D)	Herman A. Metz (D)	no such office	no such office	Patrick McGowan (D)	3D, 1R, 1MOL	no such office	43R, 24D, 6MOL
1908	George B. McClellan Jr. (D)	Herman A. Metz (D)	no such office	no such office	Patrick McGowan (D)	3D, 1R, 1MOL	no such office	46D, 26R, 1Ind
1909	George B. McClellan Jr. (D)	Herman A. Metz (D)	no such office	no such office	Patrick McGowan (D)	3D, 1R, 1MOL	no such office	46D, 26R, 1Ind
1910	William Jay Gaynor (D)	John Purroy Mitchel (Fus)	no such office	no such office	William A. Prendergast (R)	4D, 1R	no such office	41D, 32R
1911	William Jay Gaynor (D)	John Purroy Mitchel (Fus)	no such office	no such office	William A. Prendergast (R)	4D, 1R	no such office	41D, 32R
1912	William Jay Gaynor (D)	Ardolph L. Kline (R)	no such office	no such office	William A. Prendergast (R)	4D, 1R	no such office	39R, 34D
1913	Ardolph Loges Kline (R)	Ardolph L. Kline (R)	no such office	no such office	William A. Prendergast (R)	4D, 1R	no such office	39R, 34D
1914	John Purroy Mitchel (Fus)	George McAneny (D)	no such office	no such office	William A. Prendergast (R)	3R, 2D	no such office	41R, 31D, 1Prog
1915	John Purroy Mitchel (Fus)	George McAneny (D)	no such office	no such office	William A. Prendergast (R)	3R, 2D	no such office	41R, 31D, 1Prog
1916	John Purroy Mitchel (Fus)	George McAneny (D)	no such office	no such office	William A. Prendergast (R)	3R, 2D	no such office	54D, 19R
1917	John Purroy Mitchel (Fus)	Frank R. Dowling (D)	no such office	no such office	William A. Prendergast (R)	3R, 2D	no such office	54D, 19R
1918	John Francis Hylan (D)	Al Smith (D)	no such office	no such office	Charles L. Craig (D)	5D	no such office	44D, 16R, 7Soc
1919	John Francis Hylan (D)	Robert L. Moran (D)	no such office	no such office	Charles L. Craig (D)	5D	no such office	44D, 16R, 7Soc
1920	John Francis Hylan (D)	Fiorello La Guardia (R)	no such office	no such office	Charles L. Craig (D)	4D, 1R	no such office	37D, 26R, 4Soc
1921	John Francis Hylan (D)	Fiorello La Guardia (R)	no such office	no such office	Charles L. Craig (D)	4D, 1R	no such office	37D, 26R, 4Soc
1922	John Francis Hylan (D)	George Murray Hulbert (D)	no such office	no such office	Charles L. Craig (D)	5D	no such office	53D, 12R
1923	John Francis Hylan (D)	George Murray Hulbert (D)	no such office	no such office	Charles L. Craig (D)	5D	no such office	54D, 11R
1924	John Francis Hylan (D)	George Murray Hulbert (D)	no such office	no such office	Charles L. Craig (D)	5D	no such office	[?]
1925	John Francis Hylan (D)	George Murray Hulbert (D)	no such office	no such office	Charles L. Craig (D)	5D	no such office	[?]
1926	Jimmy Walker (D)	Joseph V. McKee (D)	no such office	no such office	Charles W. Berry (D)	5D	no such office	[?]
1927	Jimmy Walker (D)	Joseph V. McKee (D)	no such office	no such office	Charles W. Berry (D)	5D	no such office	[?]
1928	Jimmy Walker (D)	Joseph V. McKee (D)	no such office	no such office	Charles W. Berry (D)	5D	no such office	66D, 6R
1929	Jimmy Walker (D)	Joseph V. McKee (D)	no such office	no such office	Charles W. Berry (D)	4D, 1R	no such office	66D, 6R
1930	Jimmy Walker (D)	Joseph V. McKee (D)	no such office	no such office	Charles W. Berry (D)	4D, 1R	no such office	61D, 4R
1931	Jimmy Walker (D)	Joseph V. McKee (D)	no such office	no such office	Charles W. Berry (D)	4D, 1R	no such office	61D, 4R
1932	Joseph V. McKee (D)	Joseph V. McKee (D)	no such office	no such office	Charles W. Berry (D)	4D, 1R	no such office	64D, 1R
1933	John P. O'Brien (D)	Joseph V. McKee (D)	no such office	no such office	Charles W. Berry (D)/ George McAneny (D)	4D, 1R	no such office	64D, 1R
1934	Fiorello La Guardia (R)	Bernard S. Deutsch (Fus)	no such office	no such office	Joseph McGoldrick (R)	3D, 2R	no such office	48D, 17R
1935	Fiorello La Guardia (R)	Bernard S. Deutsch (Fus)	no such office	no such office	Frank J. Taylor (D)	3D, 2R	no such office	48D, 17R
1936	Fiorello La Guardia (R)	Bernard S. Deutsch (Fus)	no such office	no such office	Frank J. Taylor (D)	3D, 2R	no such office	62D, 3R
1937	Fiorello La Guardia (R)	William F. Brunner (D)	no such office	no such office	Frank J. Taylor (D)	3D, 2R	no such office	62D, 3R
1938	Fiorello La Guardia (R)	office abolished	Newbold Morris (R)	no such office	Joseph McGoldrick (R)	3R, 2D	no such office	14D, 5AL, 3R, 3Fus, 1I
1939	Fiorello La Guardia (R)	office abolished	Newbold Morris (R)	no such office	Joseph McGoldrick (R)	3R, 2D	no such office	14D, 5AL, 3R, 3Fus, 1I
1940	Fiorello La Guardia (R)	office abolished	Newbold Morris (R)	no such office	Joseph McGoldrick (R)	3R, 2D	no such office	14D, 2AL, 2Fus, 2R, 1I
1941	Fiorello La Guardia (R)	office abolished	Newbold Morris (R)	no such office	Joseph McGoldrick (R)	3R, 2D	no such office	14D, 2AL, 2Fus, 2R, 1I
1942	Fiorello La Guardia (R)	office abolished	Newbold Morris (R)	no such office	Joseph McGoldrick (R)	3D, 2R	no such office	17D, 3AL, 2Fus, 2R, 1Com, 1I
1943	Fiorello La Guardia (R)	office abolished	Newbold Morris (R)	no such office	Joseph McGoldrick (R)	3D, 2R	no such office	17D, 3AL, 2Fus, 2R, 1Com, 1I
1944	Fiorello La Guardia (R)	office abolished	Newbold Morris (R)	no such office	Joseph McGoldrick (R)	3D, 2R	no such office	10D, 3R, 2Com, 2AL
1945	Fiorello La Guardia (R)	office abolished	Newbold Morris (R)	no such office	Joseph McGoldrick (R)	3D, 2R	no such office	10D, 3R, 2Com, 2AL
1946	William O'Dwyer (D)	office abolished	Vincent R. Impellitteri (D)	no such office	Lazarus Joseph (D)	5D	no such office	14D, 3R, 1AL, 2C, 1Lib, 1I
1947	William O'Dwyer (D)	office abolished	Vincent R. Impellitteri (D)	no such office	Lazarus Joseph (D)	5D	no such office	12D, 5R, 2AL, 2Com, 1I, 1L
1948	William O'Dwyer (D)	office abolished	Vincent R. Impellitteri (D)	no such office	Lazarus Joseph (D)	5D	no such office	12D, 5R, 2AL, 2Com, 1I, 1L
1949	William O'Dwyer (D)	office abolished	Vincent R. Impellitteri (D)	no such office	Lazarus Joseph (D)	5D	no such office	12D, 5R, 2AL, 2Com, 1I, 1L
1950	William O'Dwyer (D)	office abolished	Vincent R. Impellitteri (D)	no such office	Lazarus Joseph (D)	5D	no such office	24D, 1R
1951	Vincent R. Impellitteri (D)	office abolished	Rudolph Halley (Lib)	no such office	Lazarus Joseph (D)	5D	no such office	24D, 1R
1952	Vincent R. Impellitteri (D)	office abolished	Rudolph Halley (Lib)	no such office	Lazarus Joseph (D)	4D, 1R	no such office	24D, 1R
1953	Vincent R. Impellitteri (D)	office abolished	Rudolph Halley (Lib)	no such office	Lazarus Joseph (D)	4D, 1R	no such office	24D, 1R
1954	Robert F. Wagner Jr. (D)	office abolished	Abe Stark (D)	no such office	Lawrence E. Gerosa(D)	4D, 1R	no such office	23D, 2R
1955	Robert F. Wagner Jr. (D)	office abolished	Abe Stark (D)	no such office	Lawrence E. Gerosa(D)	4D, 1R	no such office	23D, 2R
1956	Robert F. Wagner Jr. (D)	office abolished	Abe Stark (D)	no such office	Lawrence E. Gerosa(D)	4D, 1R	no such office	23D, 2R
1957	Robert F. Wagner Jr. (D)	office abolished	Abe Stark (D)	no such office	Lawrence E. Gerosa(D)	4D, 1R	no such office	23D, 2R
1958	Robert F. Wagner Jr. (D)	office abolished	Abe Stark (D)	no such office	Lawrence E. Gerosa(D)	5D	no such office	24D, 1R
1959	Robert F. Wagner Jr. (D)	office abolished	Abe Stark (D)	no such office	Lawrence E. Gerosa(D)	5D	no such office	24D, 1R
1960	Robert F. Wagner Jr. (D)	office abolished	Abe Stark (D)	no such office	Lawrence E. Gerosa(D)	5D	no such office	24D, 1R
1961	Robert F. Wagner Jr. (D)	office abolished	Abe Stark (D)	no such office	Lawrence E. Gerosa(D)	5D	no such office	24D, 1R
1962	Robert F. Wagner Jr. (D)	office abolished	Paul R. Screvane (D)	no such office	Abraham Beame (D)	4D, 1R	no such office	23D, 2R
1963	Robert F. Wagner Jr. (D)	office abolished	Paul R. Screvane (D)	no such office	Abraham Beame (D)	4D, 1R	no such office	23D, 2R
1964	Robert F. Wagner Jr. (D)	office abolished	Paul R. Screvane (D)	no such office	Abraham Beame (D)	4D, 1R	no such office	28D, 7R
1965	Robert F. Wagner Jr. (D)	office abolished	Paul R. Screvane (D)	no such office	Abraham Beame (D)	4D, 1R	no such office	28D, 7R
1966	John Lindsay (R)	office abolished	Frank D. O'Connor (D)	no such office	Mario Procaccino (D)	4D, 1R	no such office	30D, 7R
1967	John Lindsay (R)	office abolished	Frank D. O'Connor (D)	no such office	Mario Procaccino (D)	4D, 1R	no such office	30D, 7R
1968	John Lindsay (R)	office abolished	Frank D. O'Connor (D)	no such office	Mario Procaccino (D)	4D, 1R	no such office	30D, 7R
1969	John Lindsay (R)	office abolished	Francis X. Smith (D)	no such office	Mario Procaccino (D)	4D, 1R	no such office	30D, 7R
1970	John Lindsay (R)	office abolished	Sanford Garelik (R)	no such office	Abraham Beame (D)	4D, 1R	no such office	30D, 4Lib, 3R
1971	John Lindsay (D)	office abolished	Sanford Garelik (R)	no such office	Abraham Beame (D)	4D, 1R	no such office	30D, 4Lib, 3R
1972	John Lindsay (D)	office abolished	Sanford Garelik (R)	no such office	Abraham Beame (D)	4D, 1R	no such office	30D, 4Lib, 3R
1973	John Lindsay (D)	office abolished	Sanford Garelik (R)	no such office	Abraham Beame (D)	4D, 1R	no such office	30D, 4Lib, 3R
1974	Abraham Beame (D)	office abolished	Paul O'Dwyer (D)	no such office	Harrison J. Goldin (D)	4D, 1R	no such office	37D, 5R, 1Lib
1975	Abraham Beame (D)	office abolished	Paul O'Dwyer (D)	no such office	Harrison J. Goldin (D)	4D, 1R	no such office	37D, 5R, 1Lib
1976	Abraham Beame (D)	office abolished	Paul O'Dwyer (D)	no such office	Harrison J. Goldin (D)	4D, 1R	no such office	37D, 5R, 1Lib
1977	Abraham Beame (D)	office abolished	Paul O'Dwyer (D)	no such office	Harrison J. Goldin (D)	4D, 1R	no such office	37D, 5R, 1Lib
1978	Ed Koch (D)	office abolished	Carol Bellamy (D)	no such office	Harrison J. Goldin (D)	5D	no such office	37D, 4R, 1Lib, 1Cons
1979	Ed Koch (D)	office abolished	Carol Bellamy (D)	no such office	Harrison J. Goldin (D)	5D	no such office	37D, 4R, 1Lib, 1Cons
1980	Ed Koch (D)	office abolished	Carol Bellamy (D)	no such office	Harrison J. Goldin (D)	5D	no such office	37D, 4R, 1Lib, 1Cons
1981	Ed Koch (D)	office abolished	Carol Bellamy (D)	no such office	Harrison J. Goldin (D)	5D	no such office	37D, 4R, 1Lib, 1Cons
1982	Ed Koch (D)	office abolished	Carol Bellamy (D)	no such office	Harrison J. Goldin (D)	5D	no such office	40D, 3R, 1Cons, 1Lib
1983	Ed Koch (D)	office abolished	Carol Bellamy (D)	no such office	Harrison J. Goldin (D)	5D	no such office	35D
1984	Ed Koch (D)	office abolished	Carol Bellamy (D)	no such office	Harrison J. Goldin (D)	5D	no such office	35D
1985	Ed Koch (D)	office abolished	Carol Bellamy (D)	no such office	Harrison J. Goldin (D)	5D	no such office	35D
1986	Ed Koch (D)	office abolished	Andrew Stein (D)	no such office	Harrison J. Goldin (D)	5D	no such office	34D, 1R
1987	Ed Koch (D)	office abolished	Andrew Stein (D)	no such office	Harrison J. Goldin (D)	5D	no such office	34D, 1R
1988	Ed Koch (D)	office abolished	Andrew Stein (D)	no such office	Harrison J. Goldin (D)	5D	no such office	34D, 1R
1989	Ed Koch (D)	office abolished	Andrew Stein (D)	no such office	Harrison J. Goldin (D)	5D	no such office	34D, 1R
1990	David Dinkins (D)	office abolished	Andrew Stein (D)	no such office	Elizabeth Holtzman (D)	4D, 1R	Peter Vallone Sr. (D)	34D, 1R
1991	David Dinkins (D)	office abolished	Andrew Stein (D)	no such office	Elizabeth Holtzman (D)	4D, 1R	Peter Vallone Sr. (D)	34D, 1R
1992	David Dinkins (D)	office abolished	Andrew Stein (D)	no such office	Elizabeth Holtzman (D)	4D, 1R	Peter Vallone Sr. (D)	46D, 5R
1993	David Dinkins (D)	office abolished	Andrew Stein (D)	no such office	Elizabeth Holtzman (D)	4D, 1R	Peter Vallone Sr. (D)	46D, 5R
1994	Rudy Giuliani (R)	office abolished	office abolished	Mark Green (D)	Alan Hevesi (D)	4D, 1R	Peter Vallone Sr. (D)	44D, 7R
1995	Rudy Giuliani (R)	office abolished	office abolished	Mark Green (D)	Alan Hevesi (D)	4D, 1R	Peter Vallone Sr. (D)	44D, 7R
1996	Rudy Giuliani (R)	office abolished	office abolished	Mark Green (D)	Alan Hevesi (D)	4D, 1R	Peter Vallone Sr. (D)	44D, 7R
1997	Rudy Giuliani (R)	office abolished	office abolished	Mark Green (D)	Alan Hevesi (D)	4D, 1R	Peter Vallone Sr. (D)	44D, 7R
1998	Rudy Giuliani (R)	office abolished	office abolished	Mark Green (D)	Alan Hevesi (D)	4D, 1R	Peter Vallone Sr. (D)	44D, 7R
1999	Rudy Giuliani (R)	office abolished	office abolished	Mark Green (D)	Alan Hevesi (D)	4D, 1R	Peter Vallone Sr. (D)	44D, 7R
2000	Rudy Giuliani (R)	office abolished	office abolished	Mark Green (D)	Alan Hevesi (D)	4D, 1R	Peter Vallone Sr. (D)	44D, 7R
2001	Rudy Giuliani (R)	office abolished	office abolished	Mark Green (D)	Alan Hevesi (D)	4D, 1R	Peter Vallone Sr. (D)	44D, 7R
2002	Michael Bloomberg (R)	office abolished	office abolished	Betsy Gotbaum (D)	William C. Thompson (D)	4D, 1C	Gifford Miller (D)	47D, 4R
2003	Michael Bloomberg (R)	office abolished	office abolished	Betsy Gotbaum (D)	William C. Thompson (D)	4D, 1C	Gifford Miller (D)	47D, 4R
2004	Michael Bloomberg (R)	office abolished	office abolished	Betsy Gotbaum (D)	William C. Thompson (D)	4D, 1C	Gifford Miller (D)	47D, 3R, 1WF
2005	Michael Bloomberg (R)	office abolished	office abolished	Betsy Gotbaum (D)	William C. Thompson (D)	4D, 1C	Gifford Miller (D)	47D, 3R, 1WF
2006	Michael Bloomberg (R)	office abolished	office abolished	Betsy Gotbaum (D)	William C. Thompson (D)	4D, 1C	Christine Quinn (D)	47D, 3R, 1WF
2007	Michael Bloomberg (I)	office abolished	office abolished	Betsy Gotbaum (D)	William C. Thompson (D)	4D, 1C	Christine Quinn (D)	47D, 3R, 1WF
2008	Michael Bloomberg (I)	office abolished	office abolished	Betsy Gotbaum (D)	William C. Thompson (D)	4D, 1C	Christine Quinn (D)	47D, 3R, 1WF
2009	Michael Bloomberg (I)	office abolished	office abolished	Betsy Gotbaum (D)	William C. Thompson (D)	4D, 1C	Christine Quinn (D)	48D, 2R, 1WF
2009	Michael Bloomberg (I)	office abolished	office abolished	Betsy Gotbaum (D)	William C. Thompson (D)	4D, 1C	Christine Quinn (D)	47D, 3R, 1WF
2010	Michael Bloomberg (I)	office abolished	office abolished	Bill de Blasio (D)	John Liu (D)	4D, 1C	Christine Quinn (D)	45D, 5R, 1WF
2011	Michael Bloomberg (I)	office abolished	office abolished	Bill de Blasio (D)	John Liu (D)	4D, 1C	Christine Quinn (D)	45D, 5R, 1WF
2012	Michael Bloomberg (I)	office abolished	office abolished	Bill de Blasio (D)	John Liu (D)	4D, 1C	Christine Quinn (D)	46D, 4R, 1WF
2013	Michael Bloomberg (I)	office abolished	office abolished	Bill de Blasio (D)	John Liu (D)	4D, 1C	Christine Quinn (D)	46D, 4R, 1WF
2014	Bill de Blasio (D)	office abolished	office abolished	Letitia James (D)	Scott Stringer (D)	4D, 1R	Melissa Mark-Viverito (D)	48D, 3R
2015	Bill de Blasio (D)	office abolished	office abolished	Letitia James (D)	Scott Stringer (D)	4D, 1R	Melissa Mark-Viverito (D)	48D, 3R
2016	Bill de Blasio (D)	office abolished	office abolished	Letitia James (D)	Scott Stringer (D)	4D, 1R	Melissa Mark-Viverito (D)	48D, 3R
2017	Bill de Blasio (D)	office abolished	office abolished	Letitia James (D)	Scott Stringer (D)	4D, 1R	Melissa Mark-Viverito (D)	48D, 3R
2018	Bill de Blasio (D)	office abolished	office abolished	Letitia James (D)	Scott Stringer (D)	4D, 1R	Corey Johnson (D)	48D, 3R
2019	Bill de Blasio (D)	office abolished	office abolished	Jumaane Williams (D)	Scott Stringer (D)	4D, 1R	Corey Johnson (D)	48D, 3R
2020	Bill de Blasio (D)	office abolished	office abolished	Jumaane Williams (D)	Scott Stringer (D)	4D, 1R	Corey Johnson (D)	48D, 3R
2021	Bill de Blasio (D)	office abolished	office abolished	Jumaane Williams (D)	Scott Stringer (D)	4D, 1R	Corey Johnson (D)	48D, 3R
2022	Eric Adams (D)	office abolished	office abolished	Jumaane Williams (D)	Brad Lander (D)	4D, 1R	Adrienne Adams (D)	46D, 5R
2023	Eric Adams (D)	office abolished	office abolished	Jumaane Williams (D)	Brad Lander (D)	4D, 1R	Adrienne Adams (D)	45D, 6R
2024	Eric Adams (D)	office abolished	office abolished	Jumaane Williams (D)	Brad Lander (D)	4D, 1R	Adrienne Adams (D)	45D, 6R
2025	Eric Adams (D)	office abolished	office abolished	Jumaane Williams (D)	Brad Lander (D)	4D, 1R	Adrienne Adams (D)	45D, 6R
2026	Zohran Mamdani (D)	office abolished	office abolished	Jumaane Williams (D)	Mark Levine (D)	4D, 1R	Julie Menin (D)	46D, 5R

Key to party colors and abbreviations for members of the U.S. Congress and other politicians or officials
Alaskan Independence (AKIP) Know Nothing (KN) American Labor (AL) Anti-Jacksonian (Anti-J); National Republican (NR) Anti-Administration (AA) Anti-Masonic (Anti-M) Conservative (Con) Covenant (Cov)	Democratic (D) Democratic–Farmer–Labor (DFL) Democratic–NPL (D-NPL) Dixiecrat (Dix), States' Rights (SR) Democratic-Republican (DR) Farmer–Labor (FL) Federalist (F); Pro-Administration (PA)	Free Soil (FS) Fusion (Fus) Greenback (GB) Independence (IPM) Jacksonian (J) Liberal (Lib) Libertarian (L) National Union (NU)	Nonpartisan League (NPL) Nullifier (N) Opposition Northern (O); Opposition Southern (O) Populist (Pop) Progressive (Prog) Prohibition (Proh) Readjuster (Rea)	Republican (R) Silver (Sv) Silver Republican (SvR) Socialist (Soc) Union (U) Unconditional Union (UU) Vermont Progressive (VP) Whig (W)	Independent (I) Nonpartisan (NP)
