= 1961 New York City mayoral election =

- November 7, 1961
- Registered: 3,239,879
- Turnout: 2,467,546; 76.16% (▼14.88 pp)
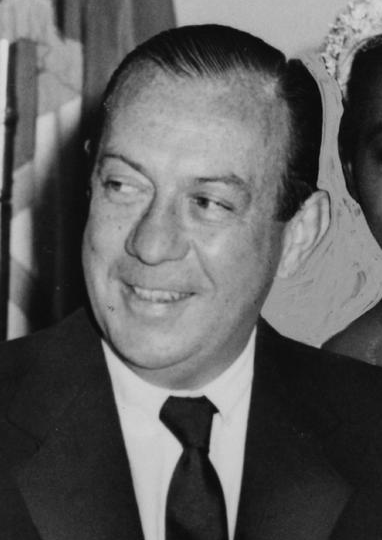

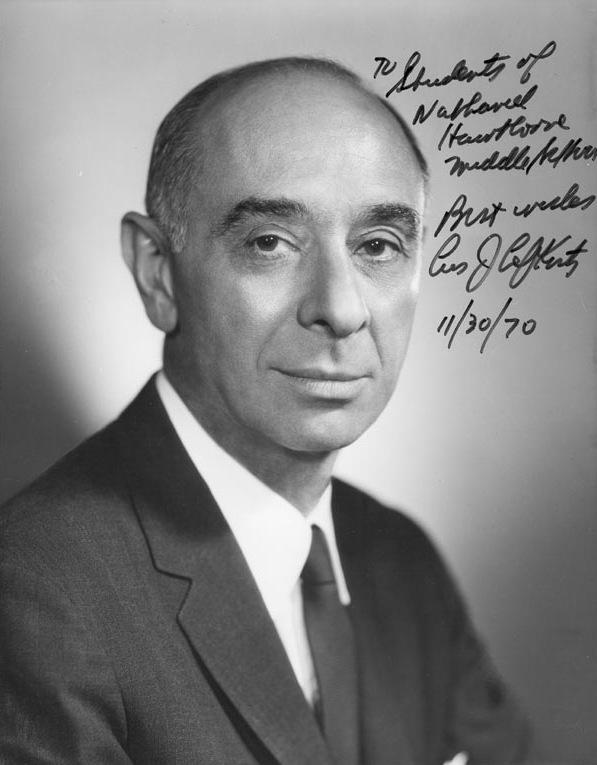

Candidate	Robert F. Wagner, Jr.	Louis J. Lefkowitz	Lawrence E. Gerosa
Party	Democratic	Republican	Citizens
Alliance	Liberal; Brotherhood	Civic Action	Independent
Popular vote	1,237,423	835,691	321,604
Percentage	51.0%	34.5%	13.3%
- Results by Borough; Wagner: 40–50% 50–60% Lefkowitz: 40–50%
Mayor before election
Robert F. Wagner, Jr.
Democratic
Elected Mayor
Robert F. Wagner, Jr.
Democratic

The 1961 New York City mayoral election occurred on Tuesday, November 7, 1961. Incumbent mayor Robert F. Wagner Jr. was decisively re-elected to a third term in office, defeating Attorney General of New York Louis J. Lefkowitz and City Comptroller Lawrence E. Gerosa. Wagner received 51.03% of the vote to Lefkowitz's 34.46%. Gerosa, running on the short-lived "pro-taxpayer" Citizens Party ticket, billed himself as the "real Democrat" in the race and took many Democratic votes from Wagner, finishing relatively strongly for a third party candidate.

After being supported by the Tammany Hall machine in his 1953 and 1957 elections, Wagner broke with Tammany Hall in 1961, defeating the Democratic Party power brokers' chosen candidate, Arthur Levitt, in the Democratic primary and then going on to win a third term in the general election. Wagner's victory thus ultimately signalled the decline of the power of political machines in New York City.

Wagner was sworn into his third and final term in January 1962.

== Democratic nomination ==
=== Background ===
Incumbent Mayor Robert F. Wagner Jr. had strong ties to the Tammany Hall organization, which had been headed by Carmine DeSapio since 1949. By 1960, however, Wagner realized that Tammany was a potential liability.

In January 1961, tensions with DeSapio and Tammany Hall came to a head when Manhattan Borough president Hulan Jack was convicted of an attempt to solicit a bribe and automatically removed from his position. The vacant post was formally filled by a vote of Manhattan's six City Council members, but historically, the selection was de facto made by Tammany. Ahead of the vote, Wagner refused to speak with DeSapio, hoping to force DeSapio to move first and endorse a candidate and allow Wagner to signal his independence from Tammany.

Wagner's choice was state Supreme Court Justice Edward R. Dudley while DeSapio selected Assemblyman Lloyd Dickens, an old opponent. Dudley was ultimately elected, but only after two Tammany councilmen were called into meetings with Louis Kaplan, the city Commissioner of Investigation, who pressured the councilmen for the Mayor's candidate. Wagner also courted the support of the Liberal Party, the reformist Committee for Democratic Voters, and Herbert H. Lehman, the influential former governor and U.S. Senator.

The final break occurred in early February, when Wagner publicly called for DeSapio to stand down as New York County Democratic Party chair.

=== Candidates ===
- Arthur Levitt Sr., New York State Comptroller
- Robert F. Wagner Jr., incumbent mayor since 1954

==== Declined ====
- Lawrence Gerosa, City Comptroller (ran as Citizens Party candidate)

=== Campaign ===
In March, Wagner received the results of a poll from Louis Harris showing his support among different ethnic groups in the city. Polling showed Wagner to be personally popular among African-Americans and Puerto Ricans, who made up about 20% of New York's total population. Both groups would be solid in support of Wagner both in the primary and against the Republicans in the general election. Jews were also strong in their support of Wagner, with the poll indicating 70% would back Wagner against the Republicans, though only 56% would vote Democratic against a Jewish Republican nominee. African-Americans, Puerto Ricans, and Jews were deemed by Harris to be essential to Wagner's campaign. Wagner's position was much more tenuous among Catholic Irish and Italian voters, who were generally against the Mayor and would be hard to capture.

Wagner announced that he would run for reelection on June 22, 1961.

On June 30, two days after the Liberals voted to endorse Wagner, Tammany selected State Comptroller Arthur Levitt Sr., who was the only Democrat to win statewide in a heavily Republican year. The Jewish Levitt was selected in hopes of winning back Jewish voters from Wagner's side. Levitt was an unlikely choice, having stated in late summer that he expected Wagner to be the nominee, but a concerted push by Tamanny made Levitt give in and agree to challenge Wagner.

=== Results ===
1961 Democratic mayoral primary
Party	Candidate	Votes	%
Democratic	Robert F. Wagner Jr. (incumbent)	456,016	60.90%
Democratic	Arthur Levitt Sr.	292,726	39.10%
Total votes		748,742	100.00%

==== By borough ====
1961 Democratic primary	Manhattan	The Bronx	Brooklyn	Queens	Richmond [Staten Is.]	Total	%
Robert F. Wagner, Jr.	122,607	78,626	136,440	102,845	15,498	456,016	60.9%
Robert F. Wagner, Jr.	65%	62%	57%	62%	60%	456,016	60.9%
Arthur Levitt	66,917	47,885	103,296	64,157	10,471	292,726	39.1%
Arthur Levitt	35%	38%	43%	38%	40%	292,726	39.1%
subtotal (for Wagner and Levitt only)	189,524	126,511	239,736	167,002	25,969	748,742	[100%]

== Liberal nomination ==
=== Background ===
The Liberal Party had won few elections outright but were able to provide sufficient votes to allow John F. Kennedy to carry New York state in 1960 and still had an automatic line on the ballot.

=== Candidates ===
- Robert F. Wagner Jr., incumbent mayor since 1954

==== Withdrawn ====
- Stuart Scheftel, chair of the Liberal Party Commission (withdrew early August)

==== Declined ====
- Adolf A. Berle, former U.S. Ambassador to Brazil and Assistant U.S. Secretary of State for Latin American Affairs
- Stanley M. Isaacs, minority leader of the New York City Council and former Manhattan borough president
- Jacob Javits, U.S. Senator

=== Campaign ===
In late January, during his fight with Tammany Hall, Wagner was assured by Liberal leader Alex Rose that even if he lost the Democratic nomination, he would receive the Liberal nomination and have a chance to win the general election.

Despite these private assurances, Republicans, including Bernard Newman, were interested in running a fusion campaign with the Liberals, similar to how Fiorello La Guardia ran with the American Labor Party's nomination. Jacob Javits was seen as the most likely candidate for a fusion ticket, and Nelson Rockefeller and Richard Nixon attempted to convince him to run. However, Javits declined to run in May.

Stuart Scheftel, a former Republican who was now chair of the Liberal Party Commission at large, announced his candidacy on May 3. Scheftel held no elected office but had previously run as a Republican for Congress in the 14th district and chaired the Draft Eisenhower for President Committee in 1948. Scheftel stated he would withdraw from the race for Adolf A. Berle, Stanley M. Isaacs, or Jacob Javits, but not Lefkowitz. Scheftel centered his campaign around opposition to a Democratic mayor, saying "I am convinced no Democrat can ever be a good Mayor because of his relations with political machines." Scheftel claimed that under Wagner's administration, "crookery" had reached levels unseen in previous administrations.

=== Convention ===
The Liberal Policy Committee recommended endorsing Wagner. Leona Finestone, vice-chair of the party in Manhattan, put forward Scheftel's name for the nomination. Scheftel attempted to have a secret ballot held and argued that union delegates were not able to vote freely unless it was secret. The convention voted to endorse Wagner with 378 votes against Scheftel's 28 votes. Scheftel made allegations that delegates, many of whom were union members, were intimidated by the presence of union leaders seated on a dais during the convention, with the leaders able to see how delegates voted because votes were conducted by the raising of hands. After his defeat, Scheftel vowed to continue his campaign and he sought to make the ballot for the September 7th primary.

1961 Liberal convention
Party	Candidate	Votes	%
Liberal	Robert F. Wagner Jr. (incumbent)	378	93.10%
Liberal	Arthur Levitt Sr.	28	6.90%
Total votes		406	100.00%

=== Primary campaign ===
Because of a mistake while collecting signatures to make the ballot, Scheftel withdrew from the race in the early August, criticizing all candidates in the race.

Liberals Adolf A. Berle and Ben Davidson served on the steering committee of Wagner's campaign while Alex Rose was one of his close advisers.

== General election ==
=== Candidates ===
- Vito P. Battista, perennial candidate (United Taxpayers)
- Richard Garza (Socialist Workers)
- Lawrence E. Gerosa, New York City Comptroller (Citizens)
- Eric Hass, perennial candidate (Socialist Labor)
- Louis J. Lefkowitz, Attorney General of New York (Republican, Civic Action and Non-Partisan)
- Robert F. Wagner Jr., incumbent mayor since 1954 (Democratic, Liberal and Brotherhood)

The Brotherhood Party, originally called the Freedom Party, was founded by the New York City Central Labor Council. It gave its nomination to Wagner. The party planned on remaining active, but did not participate in any other election.

=== Results ===
Lefkowitz would have won the election if he received the Liberal nomination and the same number of votes. Wagner gave patronage positions to Liberals following his victory.

1961 New York City mayoral election
Party	Candidate	Votes	%	±%
Democratic	Robert F. Wagner, Jr.	960,383	39.60%	▼19.31
Liberal	Robert F. Wagner, Jr.	211,175	8.71%	▼1.28
Brotherhood	Robert F. Wagner, Jr.	55,863	2.30%	N/A
Total	Robert F. Wagner, Jr. (incumbent)	1,237,421	51.03%	▼18.20
Republican	Louis J. Lefkowitz	779,088	32.13%	▲5.27
Civic Action	Louis J. Lefkowitz	32,013	1.32%	N/A
Non-Partisan	Louis J. Lefkowitz	24,590	1.01%	N/A
Total	Louis J. Lefkowitz	835,691	34.46%	N/A
Citizens	Lawrence E. Gerosa	321,604	13.26%	N/A
United Taxpayers	Vito P. Battista	19,960	0.82%	▼2.21
Socialist Workers	Richard Garza	7,037	0.29%	▼0.33
Socialist Labor	Eric Hass	3,272	0.14%	▼0.07
Total votes		2,424,985	100.00%	
Democratic hold				

==== By borough ====
1961 General Election	party	Manhattan	The Bronx	Brooklyn	Queens	Richmond [Staten Is.]	Total	%
Robert F. Wagner, Jr.	Democratic - Liberal - Brotherhood	265,015	255,528	396,539	290,194	30,145	1,237,421	51.03%
Robert F. Wagner, Jr.	Democratic - Liberal - Brotherhood	55.6%	55.8%	52.7%	45.8%	41.0%	1,237,421	51.03%
Louis Lefkowitz	Republican - Nonpartisan - Civic Action	174,471	134,964	251,258	243,836	31,162	835,691	34.46%
Louis Lefkowitz	Republican - Nonpartisan - Civic Action	36.6%	29.5%	33.4%	38.5%	42.3%	835,691	34.46%
Lawrence E. Gerosa	Citizens - Independent	36,893	67,213	105,232	99,987	12,279	321,604	13.26%
Lawrence E. Gerosa	Citizens - Independent	7.7%	14.7%	14.0%	15.8%	16.7%	321,604	13.26%
subtotal		476,379	457,705	753,029	634,017	73,586	2,394,716	98.75%
Others							30,269	1.25%
T O T A L							2,424,985	

== Works cited ==
- Soyer, Daniel (2021). Left in the Center: The Liberal Party of New York and the Rise and Fall of American Social Democracy. Cornell University Press. ISBN 9781501759888. JSTOR 10.7591/j.ctv1hw3x50.2.
