= Political party strength in New York =

Political party strength in New York may refer to:

- Political party strength in New York (state)
- Political party strength in New York City
