= 1100 Grand Concourse =

- U.S. Historic district – Contributing property
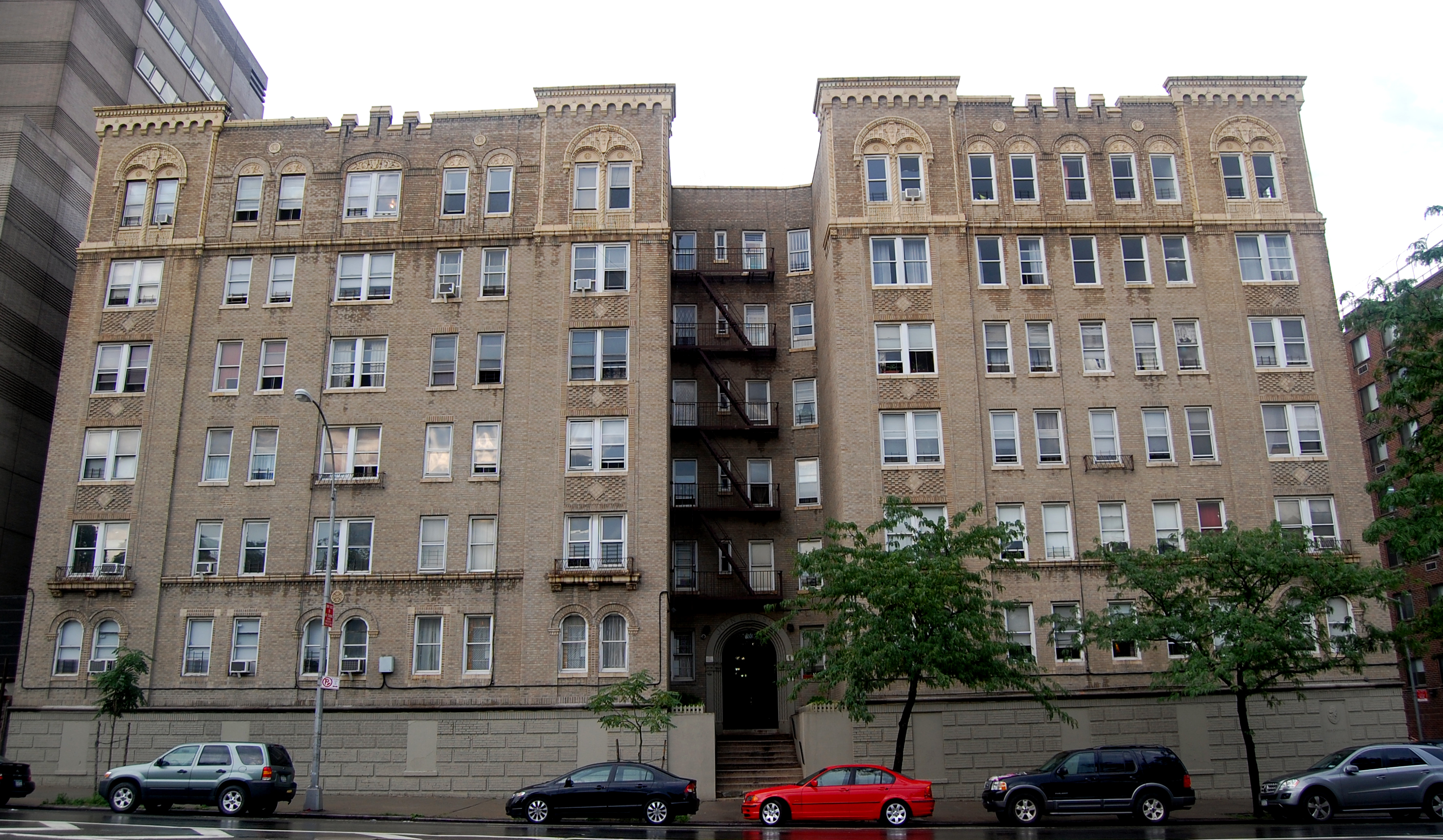
- The Façade of 1100 Grand Concourse

- Location within New York City Location within New York Location within the United States
- Location: Bronx, New York
- Coordinates: 40.832°N 73.9194°W
- Part of: Grand Concourse Historic District (ID87001388)
- Designated CP: August 24, 1987

1100 Grand Concourse is a co-operative apartment building located in the Concourse neighborhood of the Bronx in New York City. It was built in 1928 and was originally called the John Ericsson Building; John Ericsson's name can still be found in several parts of the structure. It has been considered by The New York Times as one of the most prominent residential buildings in the Bronx.

The building is part of the Grand Concourse Historic District.

== Notable residents ==
- Lazarus Joseph (1891–1966), NY State Senator and New York City Comptroller.

== Image gallery ==
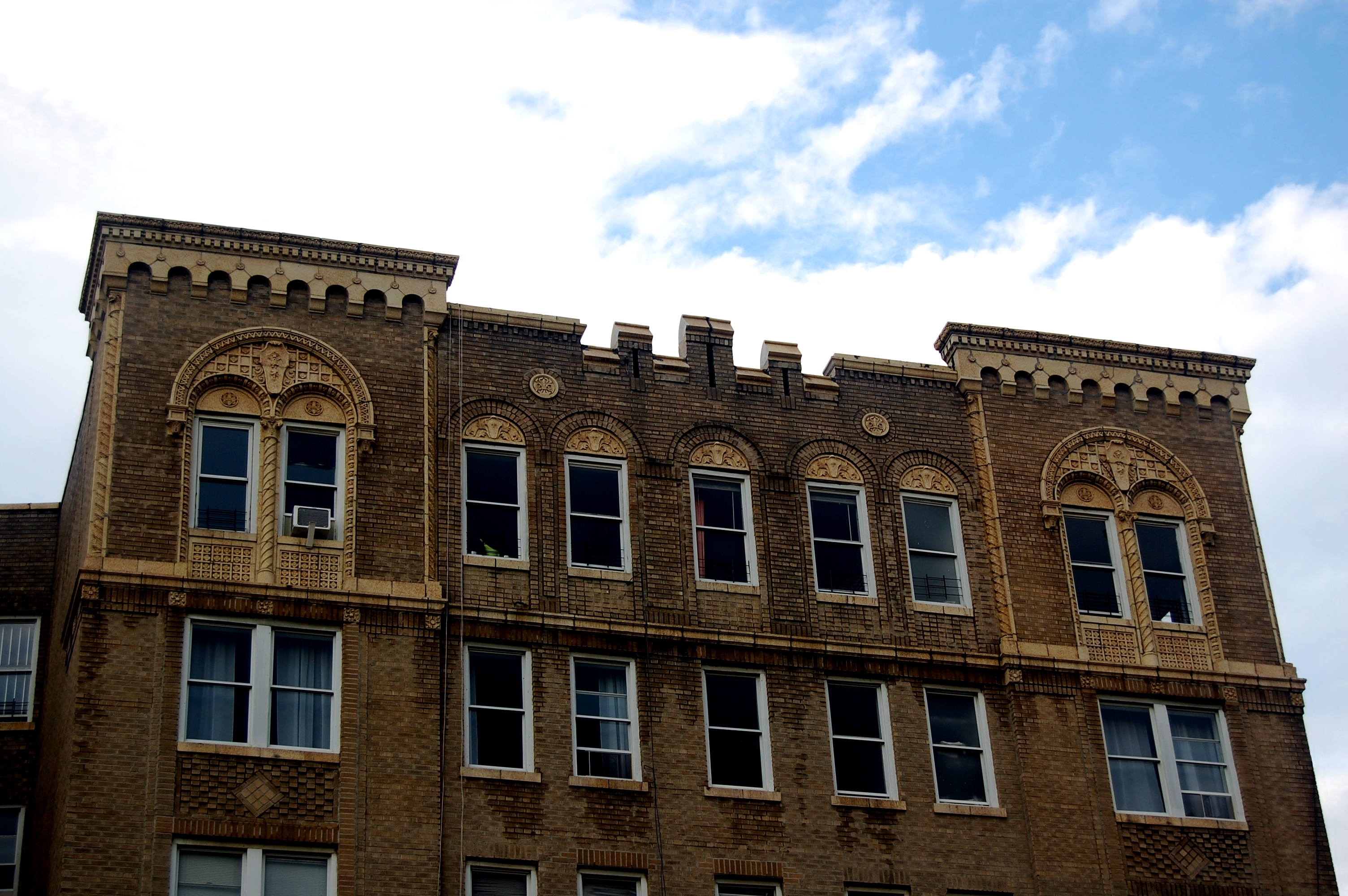
A detailed view of the façade of 1100 Grand Concourse

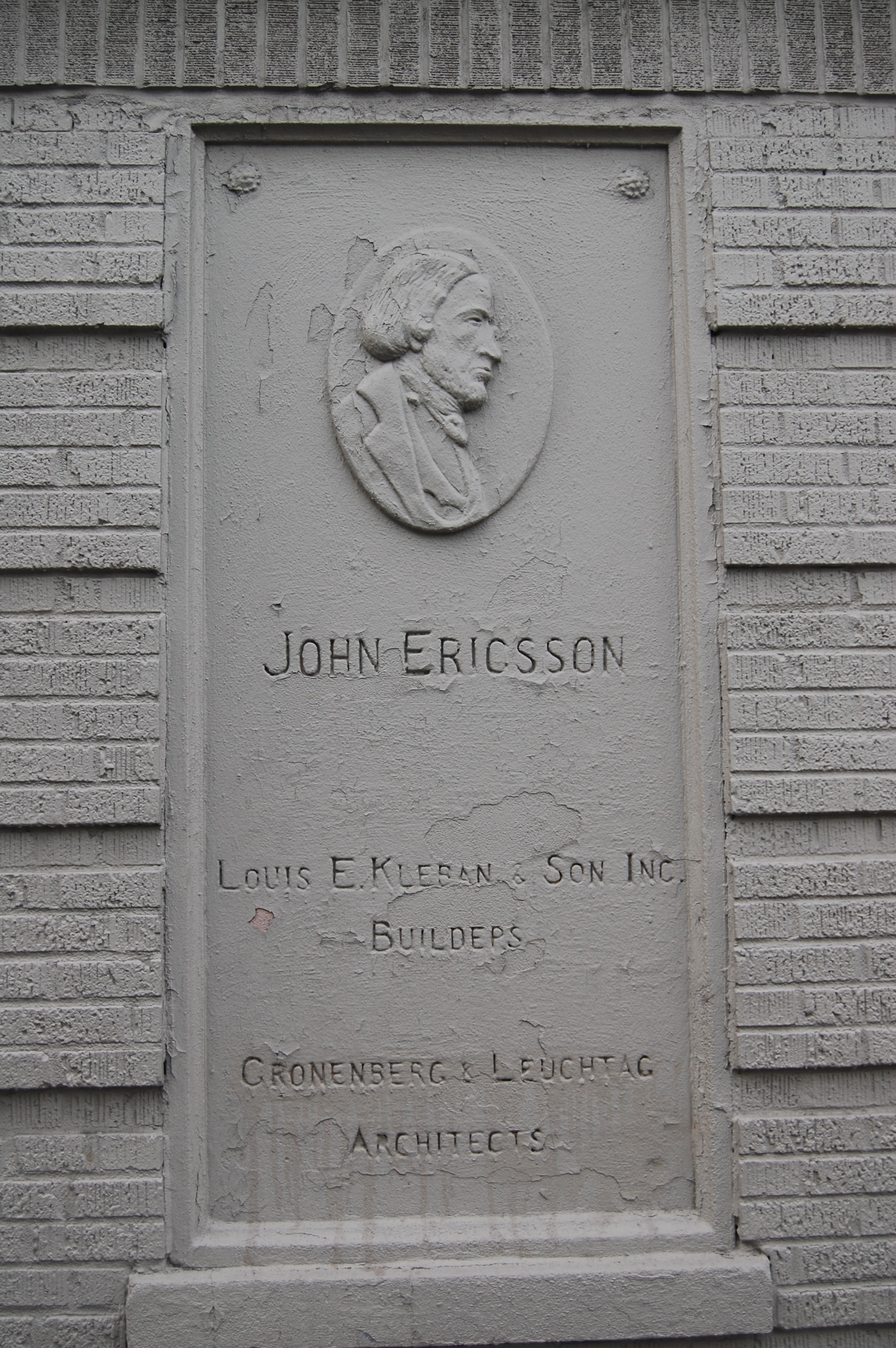
John Ericsson name plaque on the façade of 1100 Grand Concourse

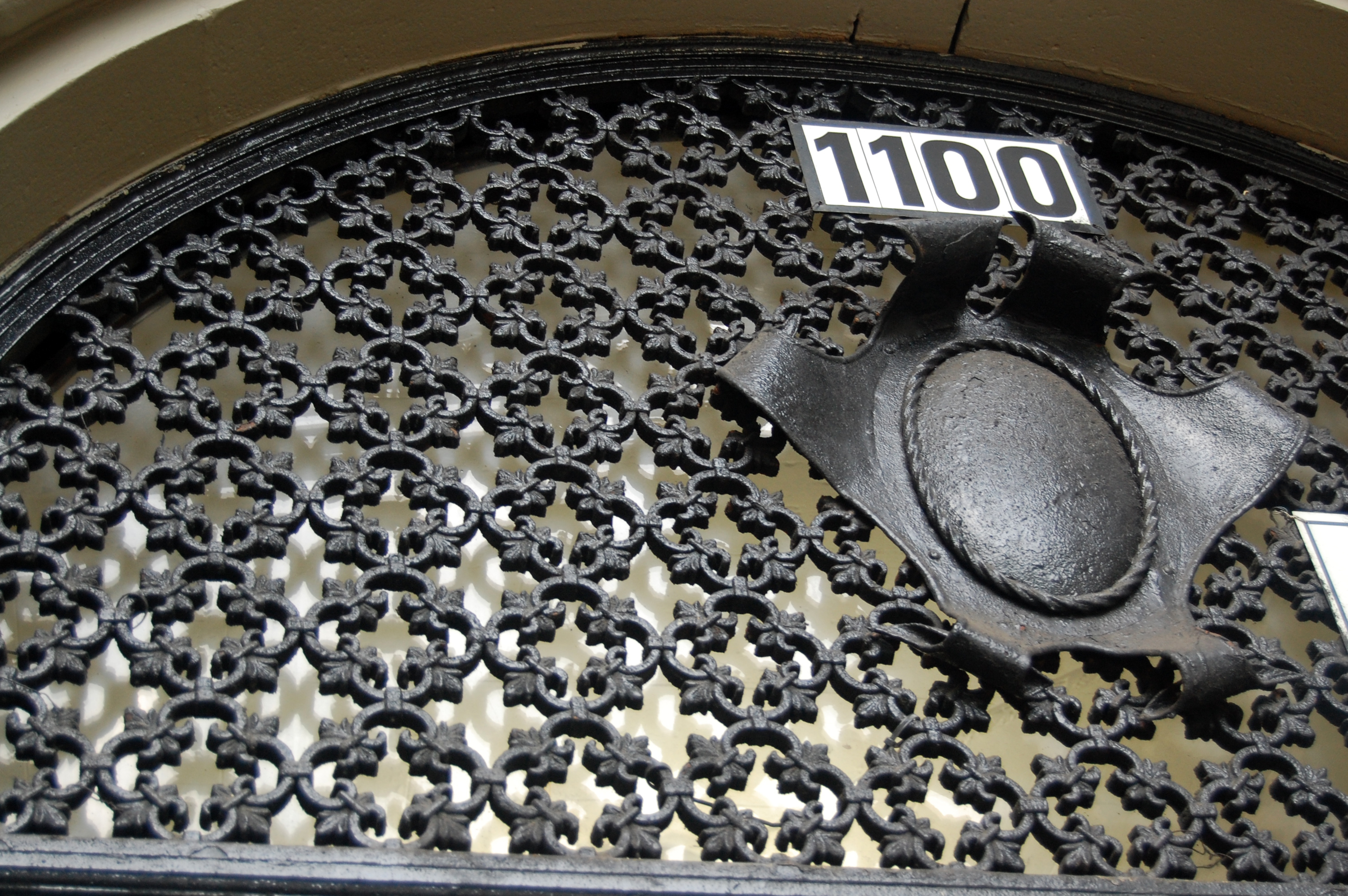
Detailed view of the metalwork above the front entrance at 1100 Grand Concourse

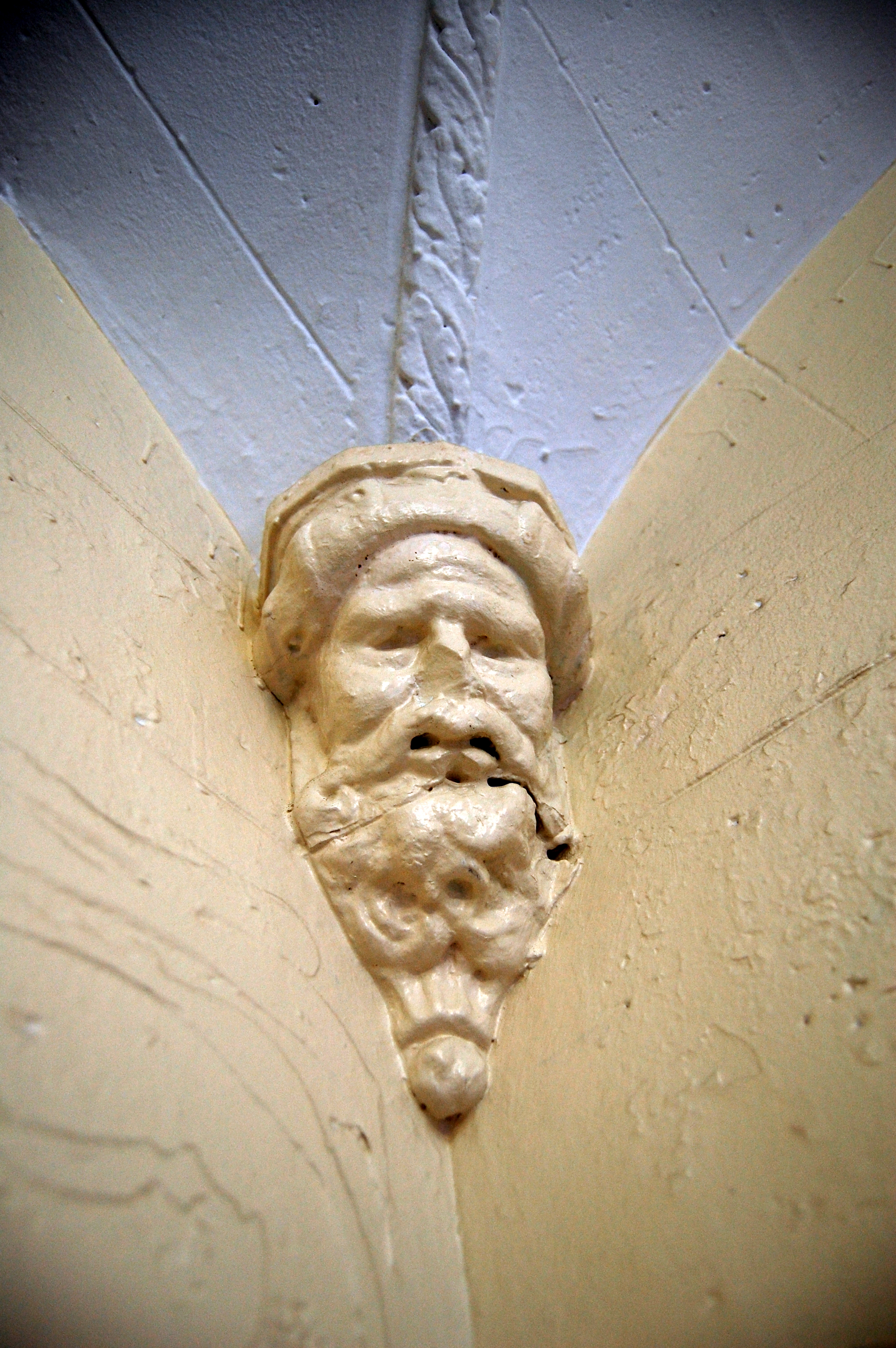
An ornamental corner statue in the entryway at 1100 Grand Concourse

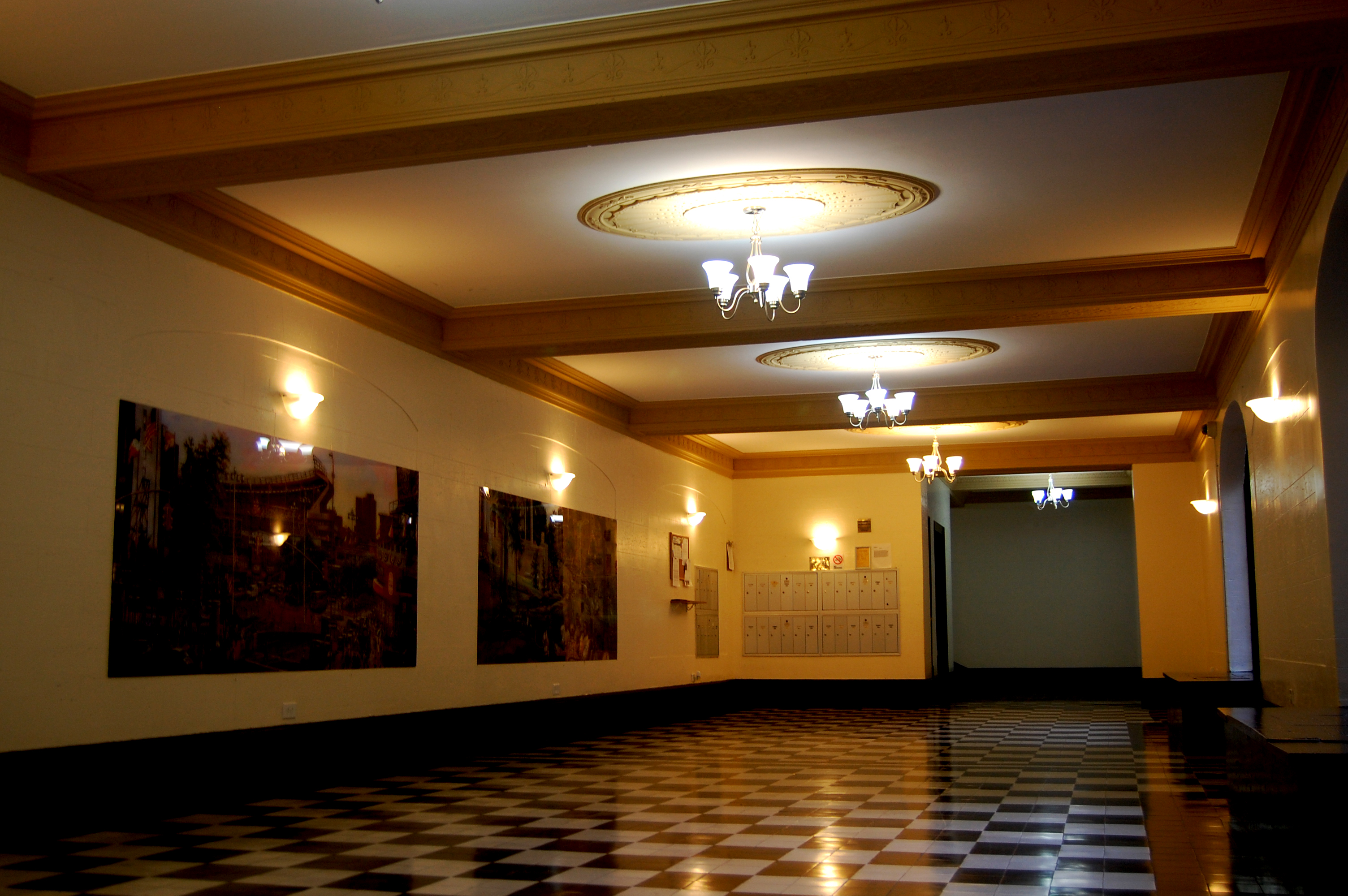
A view of the lobby of 1100 Grand Concourse

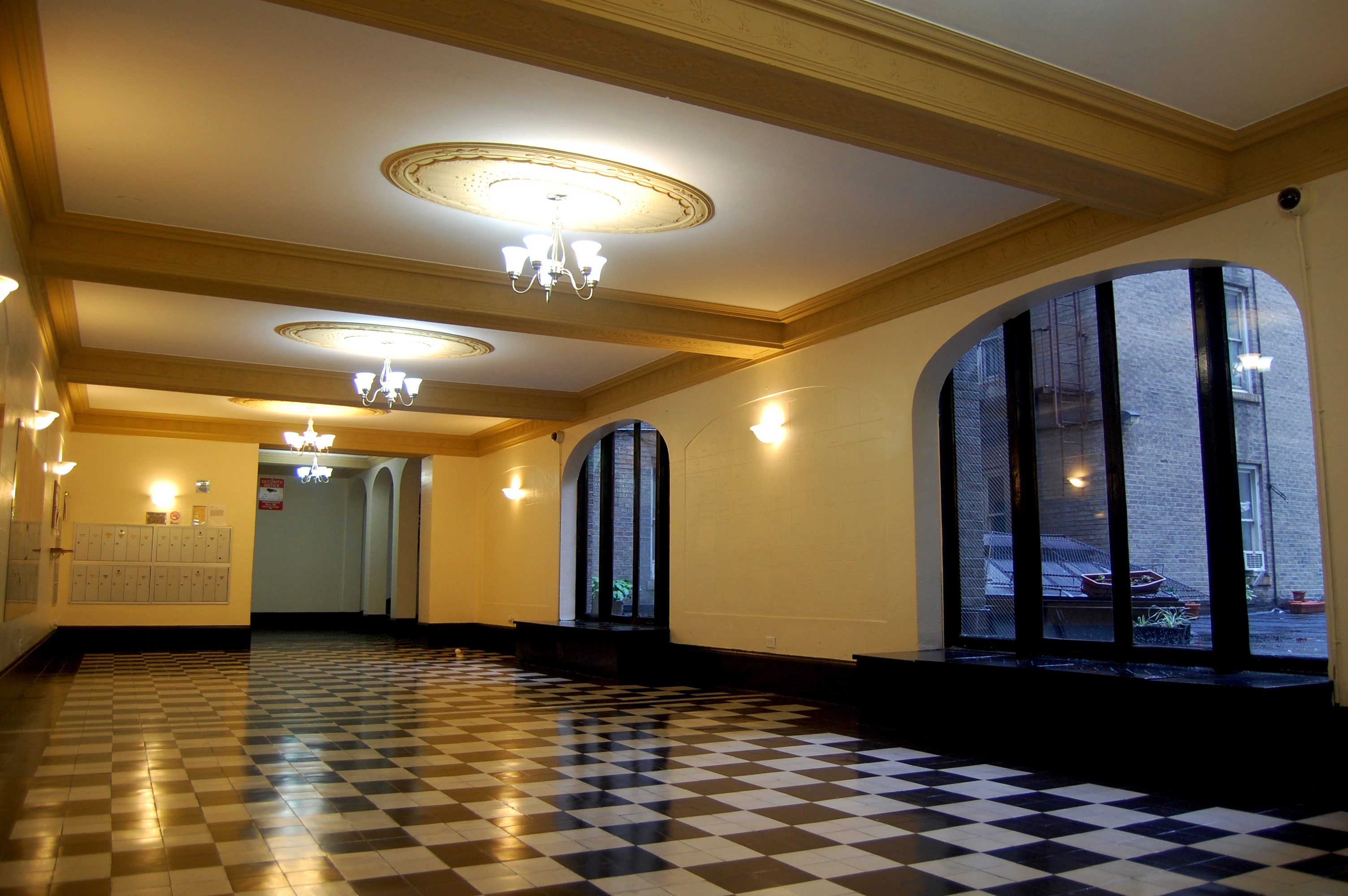
A second view of the lobby of 1100 Grand Concourse

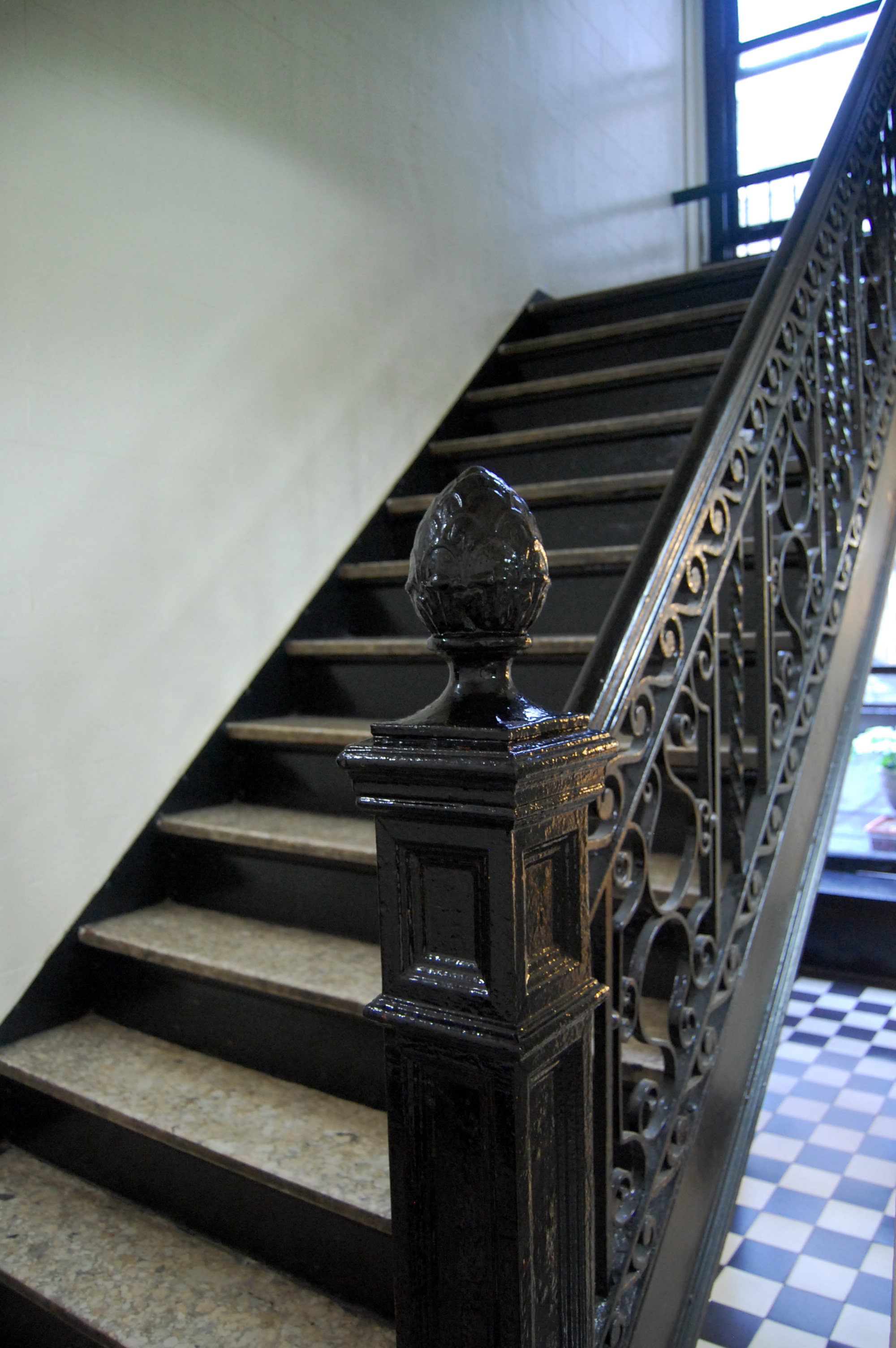
A view of one of the stairwells from the first floor at 1100 Grand Concourse
