= Nathan D. Shapiro =

American politician

Nathan Daniel Shapiro (August 15, 1887 – September 12, 1969) was a Russian-born Jewish-American lawyer and politician from New York.

== Life ==
Shapiro was born on August 15, 1887, in Russia, the son of Rabbi Daniel Shapiro and Minnie Sanit. He immigrated to America in 1893.

Shapiro graduated from Grammar School No. 43 in 1900, after which he attended the Eastern District High School. He then went to Brooklyn Law School, graduating from there in 1906. He also did post-graduate course there that he finished in 1907. He was admitted to the bar within a year and quickly opened a law office at 808 Broadway in Brooklyn. In 1922, he moved his law office to 50 Court Street. He specialized in estate and tax law.

As chairman of a special committee of the Kings County in the Kings County Lawyers Association, Shapiro exposed the condition in the Raymond Street Jail and brought about improvements in the jail. In 1914, he was elected to the New York State Assembly as a Republican with support from the Independence League Party over Progressive and American Party candidate George H. Ittleman, representing the Kings County 6th District. He served in the Assembly in 1915, 1916 (when he ran with support from the Independence League, American Party, and Progressive Party), and 1917. He lost the 1917 election for the Assembly to Socialist William M. Feigenbaum. In the Assembly, he introduced and passed a Kosher law and successfully prosecuted the first four offenders. He also introduced the first Old Age Pension bill in the state. In 1919, he was a candidate for Municipal Court Justice. His Assembly district was in Williamsburg.

Shapiro was president of the Brooklyn Federation of Jewish Charities from 1929 to 1931. He helped the Federation with its merger with the Federation of Jewish Charities. He was a founder of the Brooklyn Jewish Center and was a trustee of the center for 50 years. He was a board member of ORT.

Shapiro was director of the Brooklyn Federation of Jewish Charities and the Hebrew Educational Society. He was a member of the Brooklyn Bar Association, the Freemasons, the Knights of Pythias, the Fresh Meadow Country Club, and the Royal Arcanum. He was also a director of the Kings County Lawyers' Association, the Jewish Aid Society of Federation of Hebrew Charities, Jewish Hospital, the Free Loan Association, the Hebrew Orphan Asylum, and the YMHA. In 1914, he married Bessie Nemerov, the author of "The Scales" and "The Eternal Triangle." Their children were Mortimer A., Helen Victoria, and Dorothy.

Shapiro died in the Downstate Medical Center in Brooklyn on September 12, 1969. He was buried in Montefiore Cemetery.

New York State Assembly
Preceded by George H. Ittleman	New York State Assembly; Kings County, 6th District; 1915–1917	Succeeded by William M. Feigenbaum
