= George H. Ittleman =

American politician (1881–1974)

George Howard Ittleman (March 15, 1881 – June 1974) was an American lawyer and politician from New York.

== Life ==
He was born on March 15, 1881, in the Russian Empire. The family emigrated to the United States, and in 1892 settled in Brooklyn. He attended Boys High School. He graduated LL.B. from Columbia Law School in 1903, was admitted to the bar in 1904, and practiced law in Brooklyn.

In November 1913, he was elected as a Progressive, with Republican and Independence League endorsement, to the New York State Assembly (Kings Co., 6th D.), and was a member of the 137th New York State Legislature in 1914. In November 1914, he ran for re-election, but was defeated by Republican Nathan D. Shapiro.

In 1945, Ittleman headed a committee which supported Magistrate Abner C. Surpless to run for the Republican nomination for Mayor of New York City, but after five months of debate Surpless withdrew from the race in June.

Ittleman died in June 1974. He was Jewish.

New York State Assembly
Preceded by Lester D. Volk	New York State Assembly; Kings County, 6th District; 1914	Succeeded by Nathan D. Shapiro
