= W. Arthur Cunningham =

American politician

Major W. Arthur Cunningham

New York City Comptroller
- In office January 1, 1934 – May 5, 1934
- Preceded by: George McAneny
- Succeeded by: Joseph McGoldrick

Personal details
- Born: 1894 Manhattan, New York City, New York
- Died: May 5, 1934 (aged 39) Asharoken, Long Island, New York
- Cause of death: Heart attack
- Resting place: Calvary Cemetery
- Party: independent Democrat
- Education: Fordham Law School
- Occupation: lawyer, businessman
- Military career
- Allegiance: United States
- Branch: United States Army
- Rank: Major
- Unit: 165th Infantry Brigade
- Conflicts: World War I: Meuse–Argonne offensive
- Awards: Croix de Guerre
- Memorials: Cunningham Park

W. Arthur Cunningham (1894 – May 5, 1934) was an American lawyer who served in the United States Army during World War I and rose to the rank of major. He received the Croix de Guerre and became a banking executive before taking office as New York City Comptroller for five months in 1934.

== Biography ==
Cunningham was born in Manhattan, New York City, to Irish parents. He grew up in Brooklyn, and attended St. James's Academy, graduating in 1910. He received an L.L.B. degree from Fordham Law School in 1915, and was admitted to the bar the following year.

Cunningham served in World War I as a Major of the 69th and later 165th Infantry Brigade of the United States Army in the American Expeditionary Forces It was part of the 42nd, or Rainbow Division. He fought the Germans in Lunéville, France, and in the Meuse–Argonne offensive. He received the Croix de Guerre with Palm for conspicuous bravery and the Purple Heart decoration for military merit.

He was later an officer of the Textile Banking Corporation, first as counsel and later as vice president until 1933. He and his wife, the former Agnes Evelyn Quinn whom he married in 1927, and their two sons were residents of Forest Hills, Queens.

Cunningham, an independent Democrat, successfully ran for the position of New York City Comptroller in 1933 on Mayor LaGuardia's Fusion ticket. In his campaign he pledged to keep the 5-cent ($1.24 in current dollar terms) fare if feasible. A soldier, businessman, and lawyer without any previous experience in politics. After being sworn into office, Cunningham found the city deeply in debt.

Cunningham died of a heart attack four months after taking office while riding a horse in Asharoken, Long Island with Raymond C. Ingersoll, son of Brooklyn Borough President Raymond V. Ingersoll, on May 5, 1934. He was 39 years old. Mayor LaGuardia ordered that flags be at half mast for ten days as a tribute to Cunningham.

His body was buried in Calvary Cemetery near Long Island City. Queens Borough President George U. Harvey, a friend, thought that Cunningham's death was caused in part by his worries about the city's problems.
