= Reuben L. Haskell =

American politician

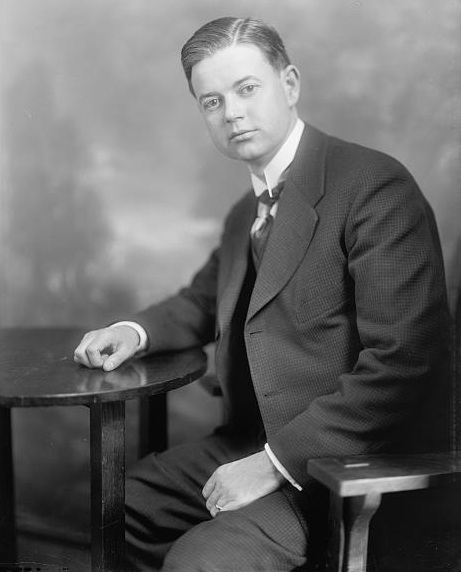

Member of the U.S. House of Representatives from New York's 10th district
- In office March 4, 1915 – December 31, 1919
- Preceded by: Herman A. Metz
- Succeeded by: Lester D. Volk

Personal details
- Born: October 5, 1878 Brooklyn, New York
- Died: October 2, 1971 (aged 92) Westwood, New Jersey
- Party: Republican
- Spouse: Aleda Cunningham Baylis (m. 1902)
- Children: 2
- Education: Cornell Law School
- Profession: Attorney

Reuben Locke Haskell (October 5, 1878 – October 2, 1971) was a U.S. representative from New York.

== Biography ==
Born in Brooklyn, New York, Haskell was graduated from Hempstead High School in Hempstead, New York, in 1894.

He took additional courses at Ithaca High School in 1894 and 1895, and attended New York Law School in 1896 and 1897. In 1898 he received the degree of LL.B. from Cornell Law School in Ithaca, New York. Haskell was admitted to the bar in 1899 and practiced in New York City.

He served with the 2nd Regiment of New York Volunteers during the Spanish–American War. After the war, he served in Company's I and G of the New York National Guard's 13th Regiment, and advanced from private to corporal to sergeant before being discharged in 1902. Haskell was later active in the United Spanish War Veterans.

A resident of Brooklyn, Haskell became active in politics and government as Republican; while he was still in his twenties, he served as leader of the 23rd Assembly District Club. He was a delegate to the Republican National Conventions in 1908 and again in 1920, and served on the state Republican Committee from 1907 to 1913 and 1914 to 1919.

Haskell was counsel to the Kings County Clerk from 1908 to 1909. From 1910 to 1913 he served as Brooklyn's Borough Secretary. Haskell was Brooklyn's deputy commissioner of public works from 1913 to 1915. In 1912, he was an unsuccessful candidate for election to the 63rd Congress.

In 1914, Haskell was elected to the 64th Congress. He was reelected to the two succeeding Congresses and served from March 4, 1915 to December 31, 1919, when he resigned to become a judge. He served as chairman of the Committee on Expenditures in the Department of the Navy (Sixty-sixth Congress).

Haskell served as judge of the Kings County Court from 1920 to 1925. He was defeated for reelection in 1924, after which he resumed the practice of law. From 1932 to 1942, Haskell served on the New York State Transit Commission.

== Retirement and death ==
A resident of Hillsdale, New Jersey during his retirement, he died in Westwood, New Jersey on October 2, 1971. He was interred in Mt. Repose Cemetery, Haverstraw, New York.

== Family ==
In 1902, Haskell married Aleda Cunningham Baylis. They were the parents of a daughter, Louise (born 1904), and a son, Roger (born 1909).

== Sources ==
=== Newspapers ===
- Haskell, Reuben L. (May 6, 1917). "Brooklyn and L.I. Men in Congress Write the Stories of Their Lives: Haskell has the Most to Say About Himself". Brooklyn Daily Eagle. Brooklyn, NY. p. 21.
- "Reuben Haskell, Ex-Judge, Dead". New York Times. New York, NY. October 3, 1971.

=== Books ===
- Matson, Francis G. (1919). Official Congressional Directory: 66th Congress; 2nd Session. Washington, DC: U.S. Government Printing Office. p. 72.
- United States House of Representatives (2005). Biographical Directory of the United States Congress, 1774-2005. U.S. Government Printing Office: Washington, DC. p. 1212. ISBN 978-0-16-073176-1.

== External sources ==
- United States Congress. "Reuben L. Haskell (id: H000319)". Biographical Directory of the United States Congress.
- Reuben L. Haskell at Find a Grave

U.S. House of Representatives
Preceded by Herman A. Metz	Member of the U.S. House of Representatives from New York's 10th congressional district 1915–1919	Succeeded by Lester D. Volk
