= Lester D. Volk =

American politician

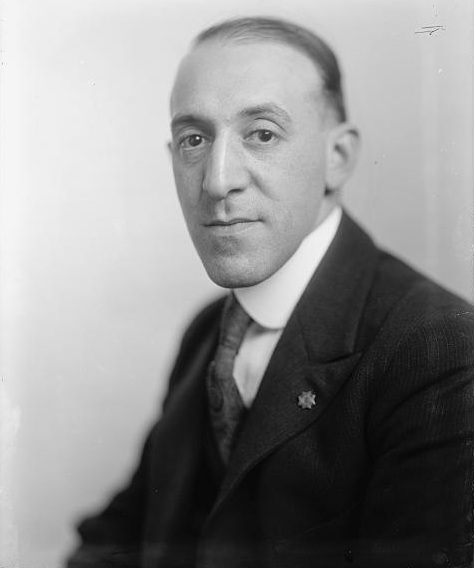

Member of the U.S. House of Representatives from New York's 10th district
- In office November 2, 1920 – March 3, 1923
- Preceded by: Reuben L. Haskell
- Succeeded by: Emanuel Celler

Member of the New York State Assembly from the Kings County's 6th district
- In office January 1, 1913 – December 31, 1913
- Preceded by: George Heidberger
- Succeeded by: George H. Ittleman

Personal details
- Born: Lester David Volk; September 17, 1884 Brooklyn, New York, U.S.
- Died: April 30, 1962 (aged 77) Brooklyn, New York, U.S.
- Resting place: Bayside Cemetery (Queens)
- Party: Republican
- Spouse: Anne Volk née Safran
- Children: Alayne H. Newman, Alan M. Volk (K.I.A. in Okinawa)

Lester David Volk (September 17, 1884 – April 30, 1962) was an American physician, lawyer and politician from New York.

== Life ==
Born in Brooklyn, New York, Volk attended the public and high schools. He graduated from Long Island College Hospital in 1906, practiced medicine, and was editor of the Medical Economist. He also studied law, graduated from Brooklyn Law School in 1911, was admitted to the bar in 1913, and practiced in Brooklyn.

Volk was a Progressive member of the New York State Assembly (Kings Co., 6th D.) in 1913. He was a coroner's physician in 1914. During World War I, he served as a first lieutenant in the Medical Corps with the American Expeditionary Forces in 1918 and 1919. He was largely instrumental in securing the soldiers' bonus granted by the State of New York. He was Judge Advocate of the Veterans of Foreign Wars for the State of New York in 1922.

Volk was elected as a Republican to the 66th United States Congress to fill the vacancy caused by the resignation of Reuben L. Haskell, and was re-elected to the 67th United States Congress, holding office from November 2, 1920, to March 3, 1923.

He served as member from New York City on the American Waterways Commission in 1924. He also served as Assistant New York Attorney General from March 1, 1943, to January 15, 1958.

Volk died on April 30, 1962, in Brooklyn, and was buried in Bayside Cemetery in Ozone Park, New York.

== See also ==
- List of Jewish members of the United States Congress

== External links and sources ==
- Lester Volk at the Political Graveyard
- United States Congress. "Lester D. Volk (id: V000111)". Biographical Directory of the United States Congress.

New York State Assembly
Preceded by George Heiberger	New York State Assembly; Kings County, 6th District; 1913	Succeeded by George H. Ittleman
U.S. House of Representatives
Preceded by Reuben L. Haskell	Member of the U.S. House of Representatives from New York's 10th congressional district 1920–1923	Succeeded by Emanuel Celler
