= Herman A. Metz =

American politician (1867–1934)

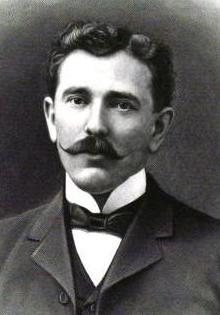
- Metz, c. 1904

New York City Comptroller
- In office 1906–1909
- Mayor: George B. McClellan, Jr.
- Preceded by: Edward M. Grout
- Succeeded by: William A. Prendergast

Member of the U.S. House of Representatives from New York's 10th district
- In office March 4, 1913 – March 3, 1915
- Preceded by: William Sulzer
- Succeeded by: Reuben L. Haskell

Personal details
- Born: Herman August Metz; October 19, 1867 New York, New York
- Died: May 17, 1934 (aged 66) New Rochelle, New York
- Resting place: Kensico Cemetery
- Party: Democratic
- Spouse: Laura A. Metz (1891–1915); Alice M. Metz (1916–1934)
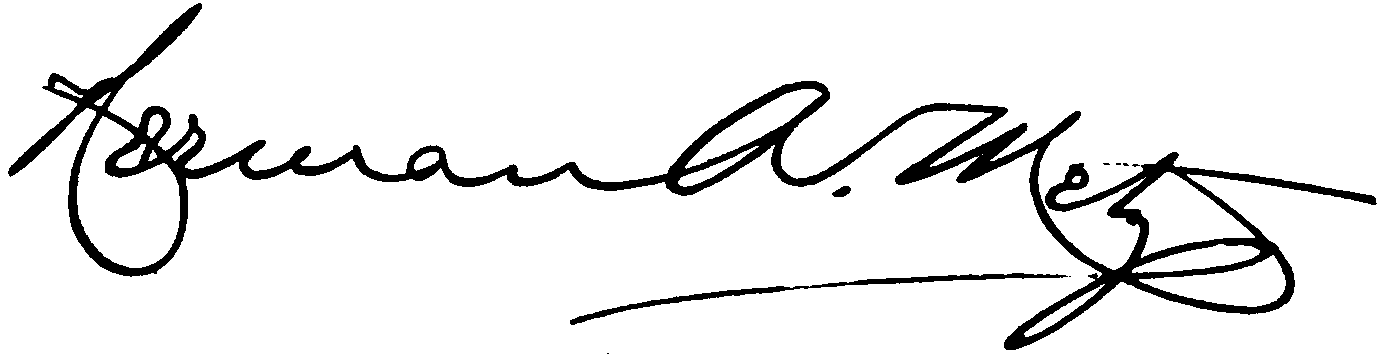
- Signature

Herman August Metz (October 19, 1867 – May 17, 1934) was an American businessman and politician who served one term as a U.S. representative from New York from 1913 to 1915. He was also the New York City comptroller from 1906 to 1909.

He was of German descent.

== Life ==
Metz was born October 19, 1867, in New York City, to Edward J. and Frances K. Metz, who were immigrants from Germany. He attended private and public schools. Later in life he was honored with the degree of Sc.D. from Union College and the degree of LL.D. from Manhattan College.

=== Family ===
Metz was married twice, first, from 1891 to 1915 to Laura A. Traudt, from whom he was divorced, and second, from 1916 onward, to the former Mrs. Alice M. Norman (nee Van Ronk).

== Business career ==
Metz attended private and public schools and rose to prominence as a manufacturer and importer of dyestuffs, chemicals, and pharmaceuticals. From school he entered the employ of P. Schulze-Berge as an office boy in 1881, remaining with the firm through various consolidations and changes and advancing through the ranks to become its vice-president and general manager by 1893, and its majority stockholder and president in 1899. By that time it had become Victor Koehl & Co., specializing in pharmaceuticals, chemicals and dyestuffs. In 1903 the chemical and dyestuff department was split off from the company and incorporated as H. A. Metz & Co., and the manufacture of color and chemicals as Consolidated Color and Chemical Co., with Metz as president. He also became president of H. A. Metz Laboratories, Inc., Ettrick Mills, Textileather Company, and New York and Hanseatic Corporation, a member of numerous chemical and industrial societies, and a director with a number of banks. In July 1926 his dyestuff interests were consolidated into the General Dyestuff Corporation, of which he became president. He remained chairman of its board of directors at the time of his death.

== Political career ==
Metz was one of the founders and president of the Kings County Democratic Club in Brooklyn. He served as member of the Board of Education of Brooklyn and the City of New York, as Comptroller of the City of New York from 1906 to 1910, as a member of the commission appointed by Governor Hughes to draft the New York City Charter in 1907 and 1908, and as a member of the charter commission appointed by Governor Miller in 1922. He also served as commissioner of the State board of charities, a director of the Interborough Rapid Transit Company, president of the National Civic Club, and a governor of the Democratic and Reform Club of New York.

Metz was the nominee of Kings County for governor in 1912, but withdrew in favor of William Sulzer after the second ballot, instead running for Sulzer's congressional seat. He was elected as a Democrat to the Sixty-third Congress (March 4, 1913 – March 3, 1915). His district was a Republican one of which he was not a resident. He served on the Committee on Claims, and the Committee on Patents. As a German-American businessman with extensive ties to German manufacturing interests, he favored American neutrality during the early years of the First World War. He was not a candidate for renomination in 1914, instead resuming his former business activities. Metz was a delegate to the Democratic National Conventions in 1904, 1908, and 1920. He was an unsuccessful candidate for election to the Sixty-eighth Congress in 1922.

== Military career ==
Metz served as a first lieutenant, captain, lieutenant colonel, and brigadier general of the Fourteenth Infantry, New York National Guard. During the war he served on the home front as an ordnance officer, with the rank of lieutenant colonel, in the Twenty-seventh Division. Afterward he served as colonel in the ordnance department of the United States Army Officers' Reserve Corps. He was elevated to the post of brigadier general on the eve of his retirement in 1931.

=== Death and burial ===
Metz died May 17, 1934, in a hospital in New Rochelle, New York. He was survived by his second wife, four sons, and a brother. He was interred in Kensico Cemetery, Westchester, New York.

== Commemoration ==
After his death Metz was honored together with U.S. founding father Alexander Hamilton in the naming of Hamilton-Metz Field, a 2.1-acre (0.0085 km^{2}) park in the Wingate neighborhood of Brooklyn. Originally part of Alexander Hamilton High School, the field was transferred to the city Parks department in 1940 and augmented by a number of adjoining parcels donated in memory of Metz and his wife by the Metz family.

== Sources ==
- Biographical Sketch with portrait photo
- Homans, James E., ed. (1918). "Metz, Herman A." . The Cyclopædia of American Biography. New York: The Press Association Compilers, Inc. pp. 86–88.

Political offices
Preceded by Edward M. Grout	New York City Comptroller; 1906–1909	Succeeded by William A. Prendergast
U.S. House of Representatives
Preceded by William Sulzer	Member of the U.S. House of Representatives from New York's 10th congressional district 1913–1915	Succeeded by Reuben L. Haskell
