= Edward M. Grout =

American lawyer and politician (1861–1931)

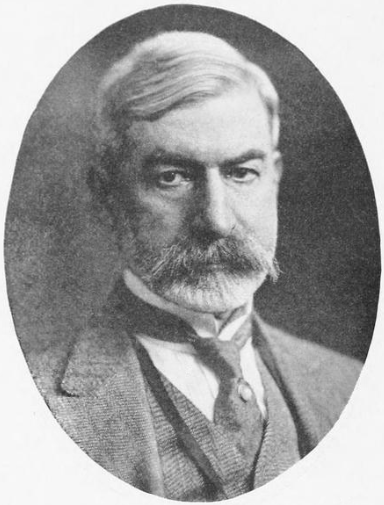
- Born: Edward Marshall Grout; October 27, 1861; New York, New York, US
- Died: November 9, 1931 (aged 70); Greens Farms, Connecticut, US
- Resting place: Green-Wood Cemetery
- Education: Colgate University
- Occupations: Lawyer, politician
- Political party: Democratic

Edward Marshall Grout (October 27, 1861 – November 9, 1931) was an American lawyer and politician from New York. He served as first Borough President of Brooklyn, and later as New York City Comptroller.

== Life ==
Grout was born on October 27, 1861, in New York City, the son of Edward Grout and Fanny Marshall. His paternal grandfather was assemblyman Paul Grout, and he was a descendant of Jonathan Grout.

Grout studied at Colgate University, graduating from there in 1884. After he graduated, he studied law in the office of Stewart L. Woodford. He was admitted to the bar in 1885 and stayed in Woodford's firm for the next seven years. He then formed a partnership with future New York City mayor William Jay Gaynor under the name Gaynor, Grout & De Fere. When Gaynor became a judge a year later, the firm became Grout, De Fere & Mayer. Almet Francis Jenks later joined the firm.

Grout served as a private in the 23rd Regiment of the New York National Guard from 1887 to 1892. In 1894, he was appointed judge advocate, with the rank of major, of the Second Brigade.

In 1895, Grout was the Democratic candidate for Mayor of Brooklyn, but he lost to Charles A. Schieren. A prominent advocate for the City of Greater New York, he was elected the first Borough President of Brooklyn, serving from 1897 to 1901. He was elected New York City Comptroller in 1901, serving until 1905. He was a delegate to the 1904 Democratic National Convention.

Grout was president of the Brooklyn bank. When the bank closed in 1911, he was indicted on the charge he swore to a false report on the bank's financial condition. Three and a half years later, he was found guilty after a nine-week trial and sentenced to a year in prison. He was released on bail and the Appellate Division ordered a new trial. The indictment was then dismissed by the district attorney. He then returned to law, practicing law with his brother Paul on 115 Broadway. In 1924, he moved to Greens Farms, Connecticut, and was admitted to the Connecticut state bar.

In 1899, Grout married Ida L. Loeschigk. They had two children, Jonathan (judge of the Fairfield town court) and Catherine. He was a member of the Montauk Club and the New York County Lawyers Association. He was a trustee of Colgate University since 1895.

Grout died at his home in Greens Farms on November 9, 1931. He was buried in Green-Wood Cemetery in Brooklyn.

Political offices
Preceded by Office Created	Borough President of Brooklyn; 1898–1901	Succeeded by J. Edward Swanstrom
Preceded by Bird S. Coler	New York City Comptroller; 1902–1905	Succeeded by Herman A. Metz
