= Charles L. Craig =

New York City Comptroller

Charles Lacy Craig
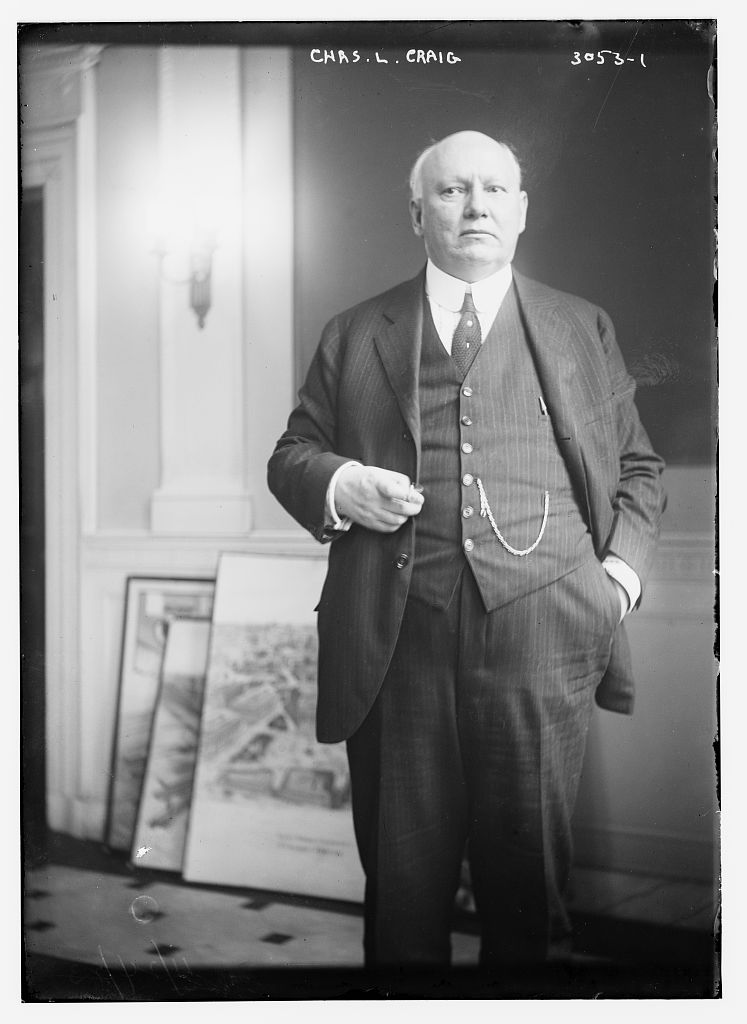
- Craig in 1914

New York City Comptroller
- In office 1918–1925

Personal details
- Born: March 9, 1872 Arcola, Illinois
- Died: August 7, 1935 (aged 63)
- Education: Washington University in St. Louis; Columbia University Law School

Charles Lacy Craig (March 9, 1872 – August 7, 1935) was the New York City Comptroller from 1918 to 1925.

== Biography ==
He was born March 9, 1872, in Arcola, Illinois. He graduated from Washington University in St. Louis. He attended and graduated from Columbia University Law School.

In 1921 he was convicted for contempt of court and received a 60-day jail sentence for criticizing federal judge Julius Mayer and that conviction was upheld by the New York Supreme Court in 1923, but remitted by President Coolidge that year.

He died on August 7, 1935, at the Hotel Senator in Sacramento, California.

Political offices
Preceded by William A. Prendergast	New York City Comptroller; 1918–1925	Succeeded by Charles W. Berry
