= Lazarus Joseph =

American lawyer and politician

34th New York City Comptroller
- In office January 1, 1946 – January 1, 1954
- Mayor: William O'Dwyer; Vincent R. Impellitteri
- Preceded by: Joseph McGoldrick
- Succeeded by: Lawrence E. Gerosa

Personal details
- Born: January 25, 1891 Manhattan, New York City, US
- Died: May 23, 1966 (aged 75) Manhattan, New York City, US
- Resting place: Mount Carmel Cemetery in Queens, New York
- Party: Democratic Party
- Children: 3
- Relatives: grandson of Rabbi Jacob Joseph
- Education: New York University School of Law (1911)
- Occupation: Attorney, New York State Senator, New York City Comptroller.

Lazarus Joseph (January 25, 1891 – May 23, 1966) was an American lawyer and politician from New York City. A member of the Democratic Party, he was a New York State Senator from 1934 to 1945, and was the New York City Comptroller from 1946 to 1954.

== Early and personal life ==
Joseph was born on the Lower East Side of Manhattan in New York City, the son of Rabbi Raphael Joseph, and was Jewish. He was the grandson of Rabbi Jacob Joseph (1840–1902), one of the most famous rabbis in New York at the turn of the century and for many years the Chief Rabbi of New York City. Joseph was shomer Shabbat, and as New York City Comptroller campaigned for the Kosher Meat Laws in New York City.

He attended P.S. 2 on Henry Street. Joseph then attended the High School of Commerce in New York City, for which he played basketball. He graduated in 1908 from the Educational Alliance, a settlement house.

Joseph graduated from New York University School of Law in 1911, with an LL.B, graduating at the head of his class. While attending New York University, Joseph played basketball for two seasons and starred on the NYU Violets varsity basketball team; he also played baseball and football for the school. After graduating from NYU, Joseph continued to play basketball, leading the Mohegans (one of the top amateur teams in New York City; in 1912 the team had a record of 25–1) and helping the squad defeat some of the top teams of the era, including Seton Hall University and Williams College.

Joseph married Henrietta (née Haft), and lived at 1100 Grand Concourse in the Bronx, and later at 240 Central Park West in Manhattan. He and his wife had three children, including Robert L. Joseph (a theatrical director) and Ethel Rakitin.

His son Jacob (Jack) Joseph, named after his son's famous great-grandfather, left Columbia University as a junior to enlist when World War II broke out. He was at 22 years of age the youngest captain in the United States Marine Corps when he was killed. He served in the 3rd Battalion. He was killed in action in the Battle of Guadalcanal on October 22, 1942. New York City Mayor William O'Dwyer memorialized Captain Joseph in New York City Hall together with members of the Board of Estimate, other city officials, and 1,000 friends in presence. He was posthumously awarded the 1943 Ben David Award, awarded to Jews "for American patriotism and noteworthy achievement". A New York City playground at Rutgers Street and Henry Street in Manhattan, adjacent to the Rabbi Jacob Joseph School, was named by the New York City Council in Captain Joseph's honor in 1947, and a bronze plaque in his honor was placed in the playground.

Joseph became ill on May 19, 1966, and died of a stroke at Beth Israel Hospital at 75 years of age on May 23, 1966. His funeral was held at Riverside Memorial Chapel, and attended by 600 people. He is buried at the Mount Carmel Cemetery in Queens, New York, alongside his son.

== Career ==
Joseph practiced law in New York City. In 1931, he was appointed a Deputy Assistant New York Attorney General, working in the Security Frauds Bureau; he was promoted the following year to full Assistant Attorney General.

Joseph was elected on December 28, 1933, to the New York State Senate (21st D.) in the Bronx as a Democrat by an overwhelming majority in a special election to fill the vacancy caused by the resignation of Henry G. Schackno, giving the Democrats control of the Senate by a 26–25 margin. He remained in the State Senate for six terms, until 1945, sitting in the 157th, 158th, 159th, 160th, 161st, 162nd, 163rd, 164th and 165th New York State Legislatures. He sponsored a home mortgage foreclosure moratorium act, the establishment of the New York State Mortgage Commission, commercial rent control, tenant legislation, bills protecting working women, and the setting aside of dedicated sections in theaters for children with a matron in charge. In 1934 he proposed two anti-Nazi propaganda bills which were passed by the New York State Senate without discussion. In 1945 he proposed the establishment of two New York State-financed medical colleges, as a way to overcome the quota system against Jewish students.

He was elected New York City Comptroller in 1945, becoming the city's first Orthodox Jewish Comptroller, and served until 1954. He campaigned saying he would work to get the city its fair share of New York State taxes, to clear out slums, to construct new schools, to ease traffic congestion, to make the transportation system more modern, and to increase city-operated health and hospital services. The New York Times praised Joseph after his election on the Democratic-American Labor Party ticket, stating that "In the eleven years that he served as a member of the State Senate, Lazarus Joseph earned a reputation as an expert in budgetary and financial matters and as an authority on real estate law and finance." The November 7, 1945, article goes on to note that he also earned "a wide reputation on budget matters in State Senate sponsored mortgage legislation." This opinion was echoed by former New York State Governor Herbert H. Lehman, to whom he was a close financial advisor, who called Joseph "an industrious, conscientious and far-sighted public servant. During his terms as Comptroller, Joseph tackled budgetary issues facing the city, facing many years in which the city prospered, and others in which the city did not fare as well. New York City had a series of bond issues during the latter years of Joseph's tenure, and he traveled to Albany to request the governor's assistance in funding the city's budgetary deficits. Some of the issues affecting Joseph that were widely reported included his support for keeping New York City transit fares limited to 10 cents (fares rose to 15 cents in 1953 ($1.81 in current dollar terms)), and the attempted closing of WNYC to curtail budget constraints upon the city. He prodded the city to keep expenditures down, was against borrowing to meet expenses. In September 1947 he led a parade of 15,000 Zionists and Zionist sympathizers as Grand Marshal, before 100,000 Bronxites.

NYC Comptroller Lazarus Joseph (center right) looks on as acting secretary-general Benjamin Cohen removes the first symbolic scoop of earth from the future UN site. Others pictured are NYC Mayor William O'Dwyer (left) and Deputy Mayor John J. Bennett Jr. (right). New York, September 14, 1948.

As New York City Comptroller, Joseph participated in the 1948 groundbreaking of the United Nations headquarters in New York City.

During the 1950 mayoral election, Joseph declared that Acting Mayor Vincent Impellitteri – who was running for the mayoral post – "had neither the experience nor ability to be Mayor of New York City," and lacked "sufficient experience" with only two months in the post, and called Impellitteri's Estimate Board record "blank." Nonetheless, Impellitteri went on to be re-elected.

Joseph was Chairman of the New York Olympic Committee in 1952.

Although Joseph usually sided in the New York City Board of Estimate with Mayor Impellitteri during the latter's term in office, Joseph supported Manhattan Borough President Robert F. Wagner Jr. for the Democratic nomination for mayor in the 1953 primary election. Correct in his prediction, Joseph called Wagner a "sure winner."

Considered a kingpin in the New York political arena, Joseph was lobbied for support of major projects affecting the City of New York. Eleanor Roosevelt mentions meeting with Joseph to advocate for the preservation of social welfare projects.

Upon the close of his eight years in office as Comptroller, Joseph left the city with cautionary advice; "that it is easy to borrow, but the reckoning always must be met in the expense budget, and by the taxpayer." His warning was not heeded, as debt load led the city into bankruptcy some 20 years later, when President Gerald Ford refused to assist New York with its deficit.

After serving as Comptroller, he returned to the practice of law, focusing on real estate matters and trusts.

== Philanthropy ==
Joseph was noted as a philanthropist prior to being elected to public office. He was active in and raised funds for many charities, including the 92nd Street Y, United Jewish Appeal, and the Federation of Jewish Philanthropies of New York. He was Chairman of the Bronx Division of the Federation for the Support of Jewish Philanthropic Societies, and in 1951 was co-Chairman of the Greater New York Israel Independence Bond Drive. He was also a board member of the Hebrew Home for Chronic Invalids, later known as Maimonides Medical Center.

Joseph lent his name to assist charities with which he identified, as he was a guest of honor in December 1934 at a fundraiser for the Hebrew Home. He also played an active role as a board member in the Rabbi Jacob Joseph School, a yeshiva co-founded by his father in 1900, named after his grandfather, New York City's first and only chief rabbi.

After World War II Joseph championed the rehabilitation of 1,500,000 Jewish survivors of Nazism and the Holocaust, calling it in 1946 "the duty of every American citizen, Christian or Jew, black or white." He also noted at the same time that: "The seed of racial bias that that monster [Hitler] planted in Europe is growing in every part of the world, even in countries Americans died to liberate". His attendance was recorded in news reports covering fundraisers in support of the new State of Israel during the years following its 1948 Declaration of Independence.

== Other ==
He was a member of the Hall of Fame of the Educational Alliance. According to the website politicalgraveyard.com, Joseph was a member of the Elks, Freemasons, and Knights of Pythias.

New York State Senate
Preceded by Henry G. Schackno	New York State Senate; 21st District; 1934–1944	Succeeded by Gordon I. Novod
Preceded by Robert S. Bainbridge	New York State Senate; 24th District; 1945	Succeeded by Sidney A. Fine
Political offices
Preceded by Joseph McGoldrick	New York City Comptroller; 1946–1953	Succeeded by Lawrence E. Gerosa
