= Joseph McGoldrick =

American politician and lawyer (1901–1978)

Joseph D. McGoldrick
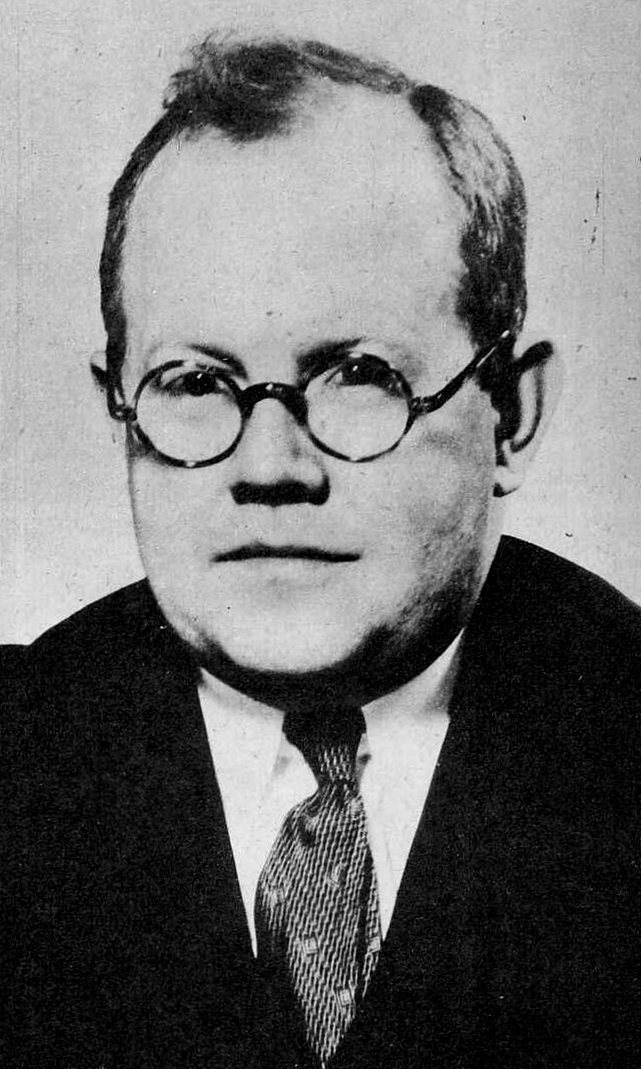
- McGoldrick c. 1941

31st and 33rd New York City Comptroller
- In office 1935
- Preceded by: W. Arthur Cunningham
- Succeeded by: Frank J. Taylor
- In office 1938–1945
- Preceded by: Frank J. Taylor
- Succeeded by: Lazarus Joseph

Personal details
- Born: June 5, 1901 Brooklyn, New York
- Died: April 5, 1978 (aged 76) Savannah, Georgia
- Cause of death: Cancer
- Party: Republican
- Education: Erasmus Hall High School
- Alma mater: Columbia University; Fordham University School of Law
- Profession: lawyer and political science professor

Joseph Daniel McGoldrick (June 5, 1901 – April 5, 1978) was an American lawyer, politician, and public official. He was Comptroller of New York City for nearly nine years. He subsequently was New York State Residential Rent Control Commissioner, founded a law firm, and was chairman of the Department of Political Science at Queens College for a decade.

== Early life ==
McGoldrick was born in Brooklyn, New York. He had three younger siblings, and his parents were Loretta and Daniel McGoldrick, an accountant.

He graduated from Erasmus Hall High School. McGoldrick then attended Columbia University, graduating in 1922 with an A.B. with honors in History and Greek. He was then an instructor in government at Columbia. He received a law degree from Fordham University in 1929. He was granted a Ph.D. from Columbia in 1931.

== Career ==
McGoldrick in 1934 became deputy to Comptroller of New York City W. Arthur Cunningham. Cunningham died, and McGoldrick was appointed by Mayor La Guardia to take his place. McGoldrick later ran in a special election, and lost. But when La Guardia ran for a second term in 1937, McGoldrick joined him in office as Comptroller, and the same happened four years later.

After serving as comptroller, he became the New York State Residential Rent Control Commissioner in 1946. In 1948, he founded the law firm of McGoldrick, Dannett, Horowitz & Golub. In 1958, he joined the Queens College faculty, where he spent a decade as chairman of the Department of Political Science.

McGoldrick was the author of The Law and Practice of Municipal Home Rule 1916‐1930 and Building Regulation in New York City, and co‐author with R. E. and M. P. Keohane of Government in Action.

He died of cancer on April 5, 1978, in Savannah, Georgia. As of 2026, he is the last Republican to have served as Comptroller of New York City.
