= William A. Prendergast =

American politician

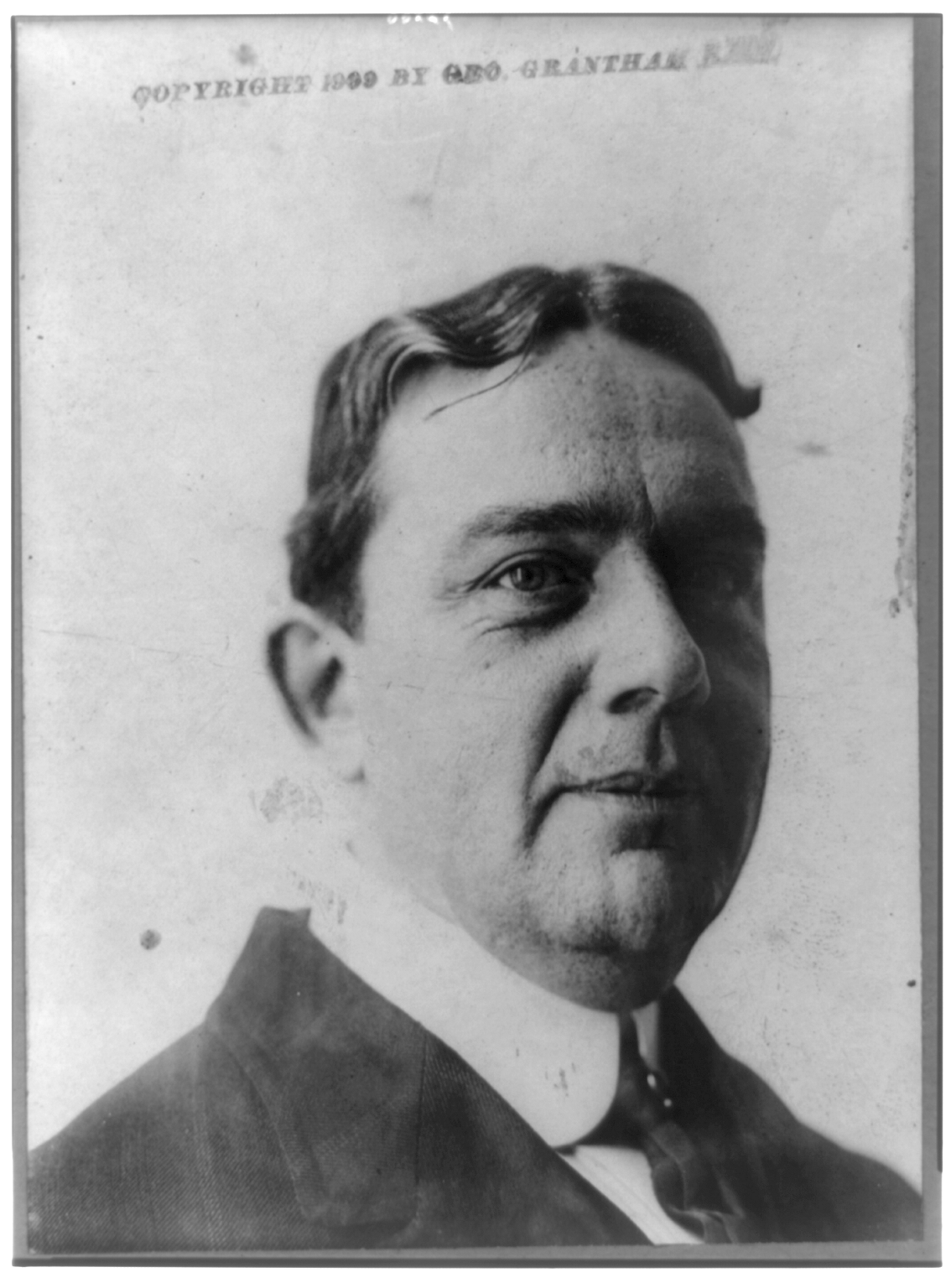
- Born: William Ambrose Prendergast; May 25, 1867; New York, New York
- Died: June 20, 1954 (aged 87); Lakeville, Connecticut
- Occupations: Businessman, politician
- Political party: Republican
- Spouse: Mary Agnes Hall
- Children: Eleanor Prendergast; William A. Predergast, Jr. Thomas H. Prendergast

William Ambrose Prendergast (May 25, 1867 – June 20, 1954) was an American businessman and politician from New York.

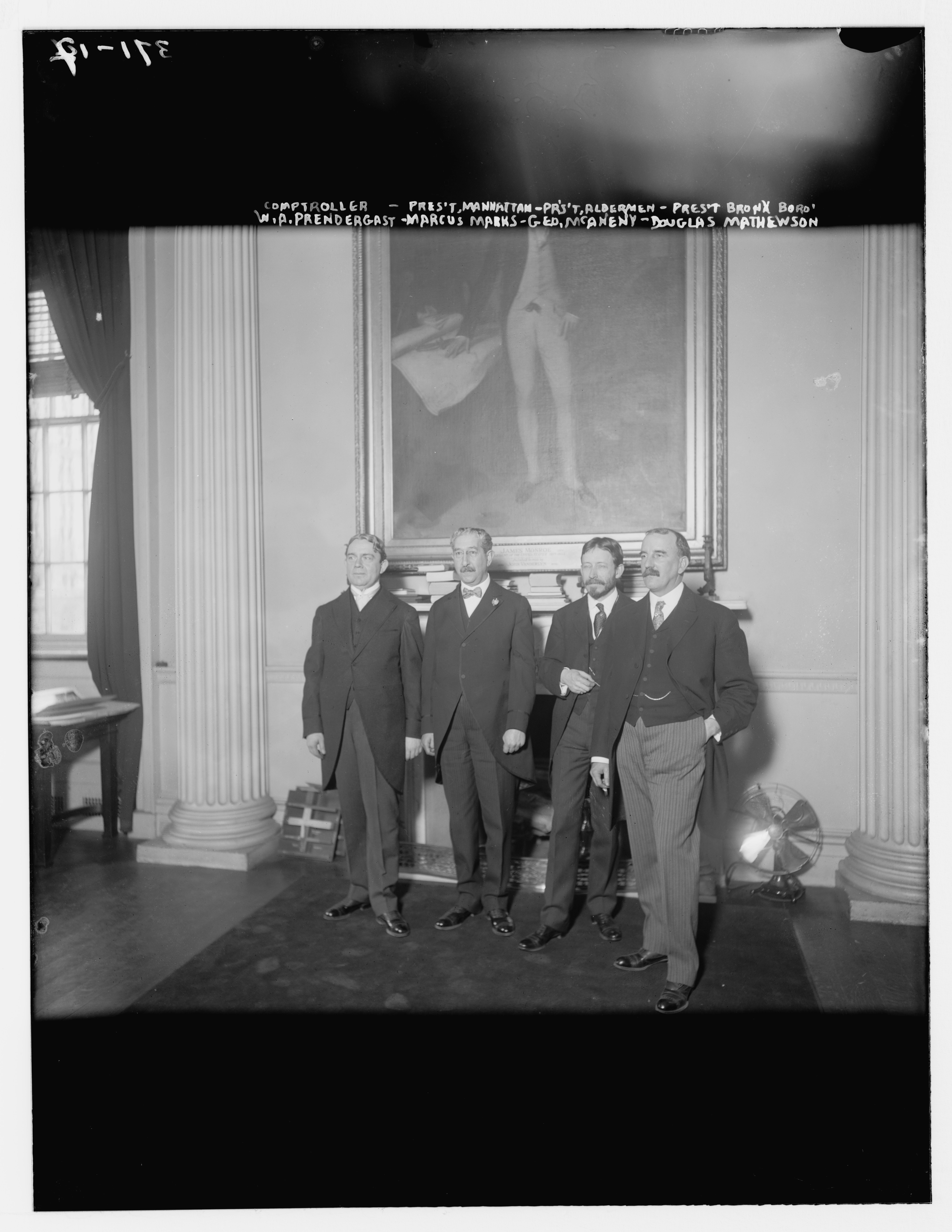
William A. Prendergast, (on the left) and fellow politicians (from left to right): Marcus M. Marks, George McAneny, and Douglas Mathewson.

== Life ==
Prendergast was born on May 25, 1867, in the East Side of New York City, New York, the son of Irish immigrants Lawrence Prendergast and Josephine Keating.

In 1894, Prendergast married Mary Agnes Hall. Their children were Eleanor, William A. Jr., and Thomas H.

Prendergast worked as a secretary for the National Association of Credit Men from 1899 to 1904. In 1910, he became secretary and general manager of the Lands Co. of Depew and president of the Island Cities Real Estate Co. In 1918, he became chairman of the New York and Honduras Rosario Mining Company. He also wrote several books related to credit, financing, and public utilities.

In the 1897 United States House of Representatives special election, Prendergast was the Republican candidate for New York's 3rd congressional district. He lost the election to Edmund H. Driggs. In the 1898 election, he ran again in the same district, but lost again to Driggs.

In 1907, he was elected Register of Kings County.

In 1909, he was elected New York City Comptroller and re-elected to the office in 1913, serving under Mayor Gaynor and Mayor Mitchell. He supported Theodore Roosevelt's 1912 presidential campaign, presenting his name for nomination at the 1912 Progressive National Convention. He was an alternate delegate to the 1908 Republican National Convention and a delegate to the 1912 and 1916 Republican National Conventions.

In 1921, Governor Miller appointed him chairman of the New York State Public Service Commission, resigning in 1930 due to disagreements with then-governor Franklin D. Roosevelt over public utility rates.

Prendergast was a member of the New York Chamber of Commerce, the American Society of International Law, the American Association for the Advancement of Science, the American Economic Association, the American Catholic Historical Society, the Montauk Club, the Knights of Columbus, the Holy Name Society, the American Irish Historical Society, the Catholic Club, and the Union League Club.

Prendergast died at his summer home in Lakeville, Connecticut on June 20, 1954.

Political offices
Preceded by Herman A. Metz	New York City Comptroller; 1910–1917	Succeeded by Charles L. Craig
