= Lawrence E. Gerosa =

American politician

35th New York City Comptroller
- In office 1954-1961
- Mayor: Robert F. Wagner Jr.
- Preceded by: Lazarus Joseph
- Succeeded by: Abraham Beame

Personal details
- Born: Lawrence Ettore Gerosa; August 10, 1894 Milan, Italy
- Died: June 24, 1972 (aged 77) Bronx, New York City, U.S.

Lawrence Ettore Gerosa (August 10, 1894 Milan, Italy – June 24, 1972) was an Italian-American politician who served as New York City Comptroller from 1954 to 1961.

A resident of the Riverdale section of the Bronx, Gerosa was a conservative Democrat who had been in the trucking industry before entering politics. After being jettisoned from the Democratic ticket in 1961 in favor of Abe Beame, he challenged incumbent mayor Robert F. Wagner Jr. in 1961 as an Independent, proffering a fiscally conservative, law and order platform. He garnered 13% percent of the vote against Wagner and liberal Republican Louis Lefkowitz. The Gerosa campaign would articulate many of the themes which would be used again in 1969, when another conservative Italian-American Democrat Mario Procaccino challenged John V. Lindsay for control of city hall. Gerosa died of lung cancer at Albert Einstein Hospital in the Bronx.

Comptroller Lawrence Gerosa (center) with Commissioner Louis Tougredi and Howard Bo

Political offices
Preceded by Lazarus Joseph	New York City Comptroller; 1954–1961	Succeeded by Abraham Beame
