= New York City Comptroller =

Public office in New York City

Comptroller of the City of New York
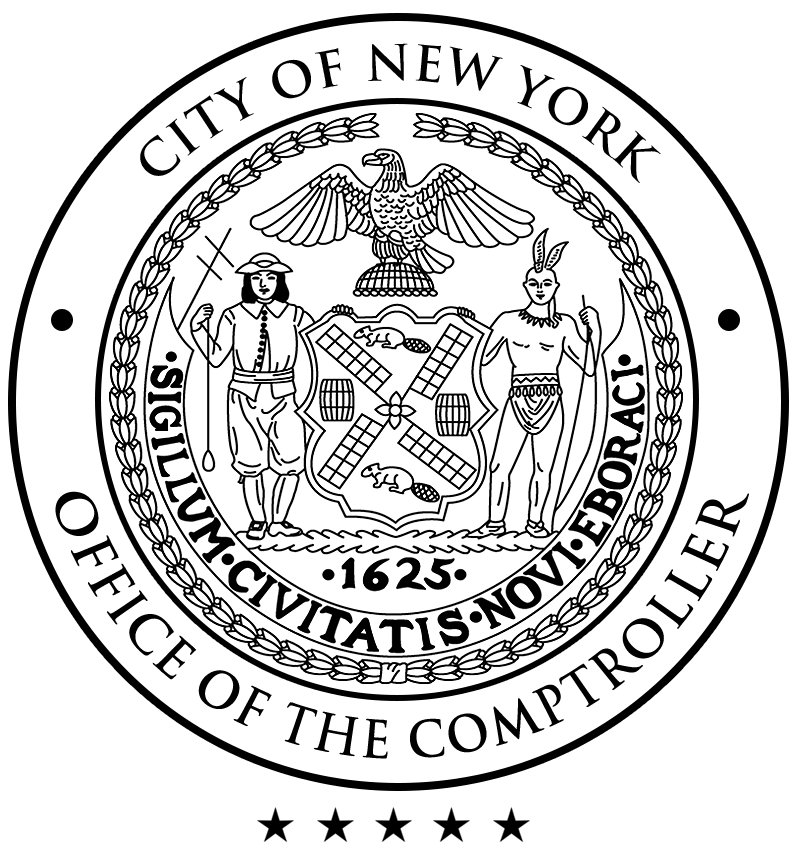
- Seal of the Comptroller of the City of New York

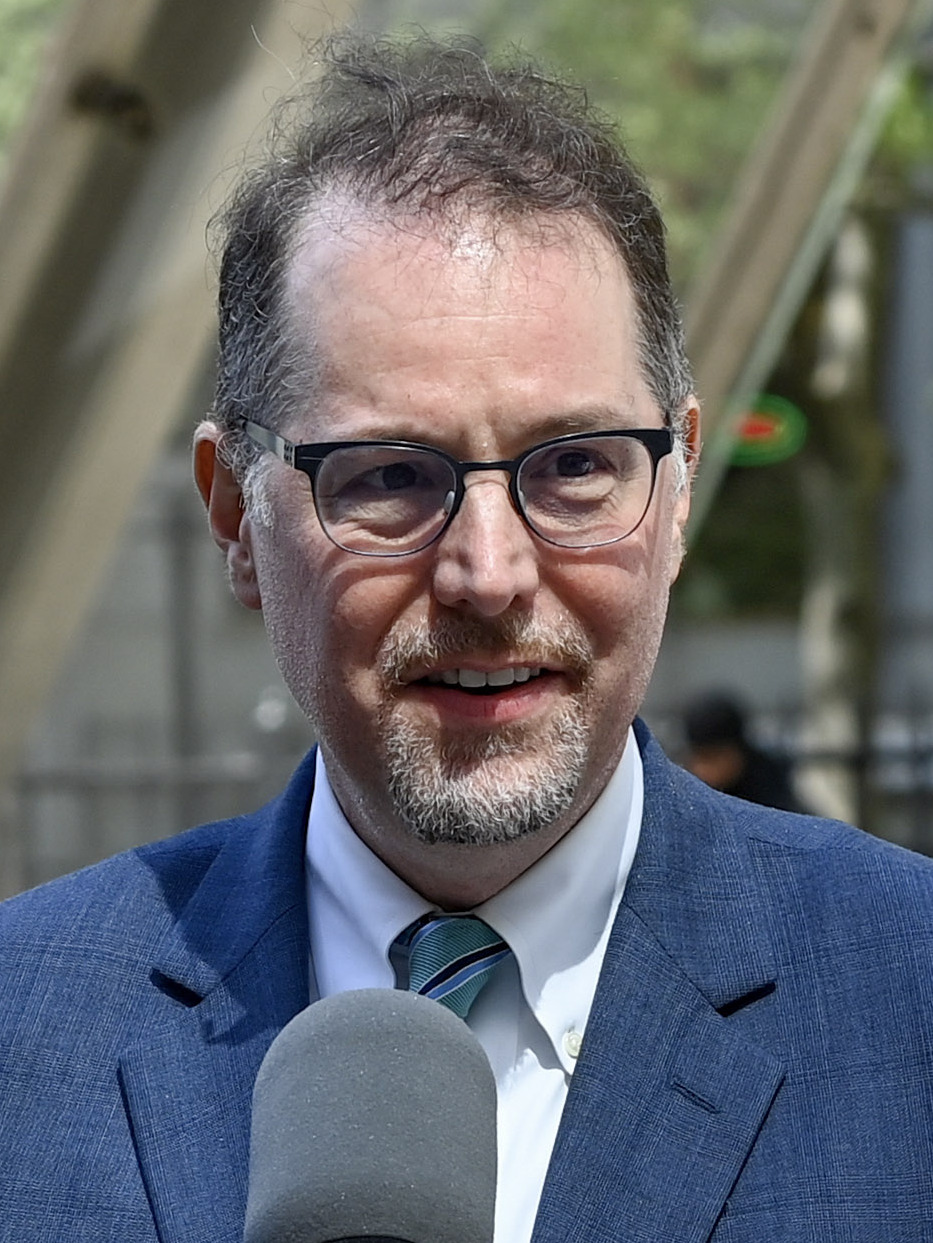
- Incumbent; Mark Levine since January 1, 2026
- Abbreviation: Comp.
- Term length: 4 years (renewable); Two-term limit
- Constituting instrument: New York City Charter
- Formation: 1801; 225 years ago (1898 consolidated City)
- First holder: Selah Strong (1802–1805)
- Succession: Second in the New York City mayoral line of succession
- Deputy: First Deputy Comptroller, Aya Keefe
- Website: New York City Office of the Comptroller website

The comptroller of New York City, a position established in 1801, is the chief financial officer and chief auditor of the city of New York and its agencies. Informally known as "the city's accountant", the New York Times has called the comptroller "one of the most important and least recognized jobs in the city". In addition to auditing city agencies' performance and preparing whole of government financial reports, the comptroller also reviews all city contracts, handles the settlement of litigation claims (amounting to $975 million in 2019), issues municipal bonds, and manages the city's very large pension funds ($240 billion in assets under management as of 2020).

The comptroller is elected citywide to a four-year term, and can hold office for two consecutive terms. As of 2021, the comptroller had a staff of 800 people, and a budget of over $100 million. If vacancies were to occur simultaneously in the offices of Mayor of New York City and New York City Public Advocate, the comptroller would become acting mayor.

The current comptroller is Democrat Mark Levine. He was elected in 2025.

== Powers and duties ==
The comptroller is responsible for auditing the financial condition and program performance of city agencies, making determinations to city administrators regarding the legality of proposed government contracts, issuing year-end and quarterly reports on the state of the city economy, marketing and selling municipal bonds, and managing city debt. The comptroller is also "the custodian and investment advisor to the Boards" of the city's five pension funds, which are collectively referred to as "NYC Public Pension Funds" or "New York City pension funds". The comptroller is thus responsible for directing and administering the investment of the fourth-largest public pension plan in the United States, or approximately $240 billion in assets under management as of 2020. The comptroller's regulations are compiled in Title 44 of the New York City Rules.

If vacancies should simultaneously occur in the offices of Mayor of New York City and New York City Public Advocate (formerly president of the city council or board of aldermen), the comptroller would become acting mayor. The comptroller serves as a check on the mayor, and is arguably the second most important elected official in New York City after the mayor.

In order to carry out the myriad duties and functions assigned to the office by law, the comptroller employs a staff of 800 people and maintains an operating budget of over $100 million.

== History ==
=== 1801–present ===
The office was created as an appointive office in 1801 by the New York City Common Council. On September 6, 1802, after a tie vote by the New York City Common Council Committee on whether to pass an ordinance for the appointment of a comptroller with a salary of $1,500 ($34,000 in current dollar terms), the ordinance was adopted by the Recorder, John B Prevost, Esquire, casting a vote in favor. Thirty years later, the Comptroller became head of the Department of Finance. In 1884 the office became elective, and in 1938 the comptroller became head of a separate, independent department of the city's government. No Republican has been elected comptroller since 1938.

The comptroller served on the eight-member New York City Board of Estimate, created in 1873, until the board was held unconstitutional in a unanimous decision by the US Supreme Court in 1989 in Board of Estimate of City of New York v. Morris. The board was composed of the Mayor of New York City, the comptroller, and the president of the New York City Council, each of whom was elected citywide and had four votes, and the five borough presidents, each having two votes, despite the differing population sizes of each borough. That construct was held by the US Supreme Court to violate the principle of one person, one vote. The Board of Estimate was then abolished.

In fiscal year 2019, the comptroller resolved 13,712 claims and lawsuits against New York City for $975 million. The Comptroller also issued 61 audits and special reports on the effectiveness and service quality of city programs, as well as on financial issues, identifying actual and potential revenue and savings.

=== 2009 election ===
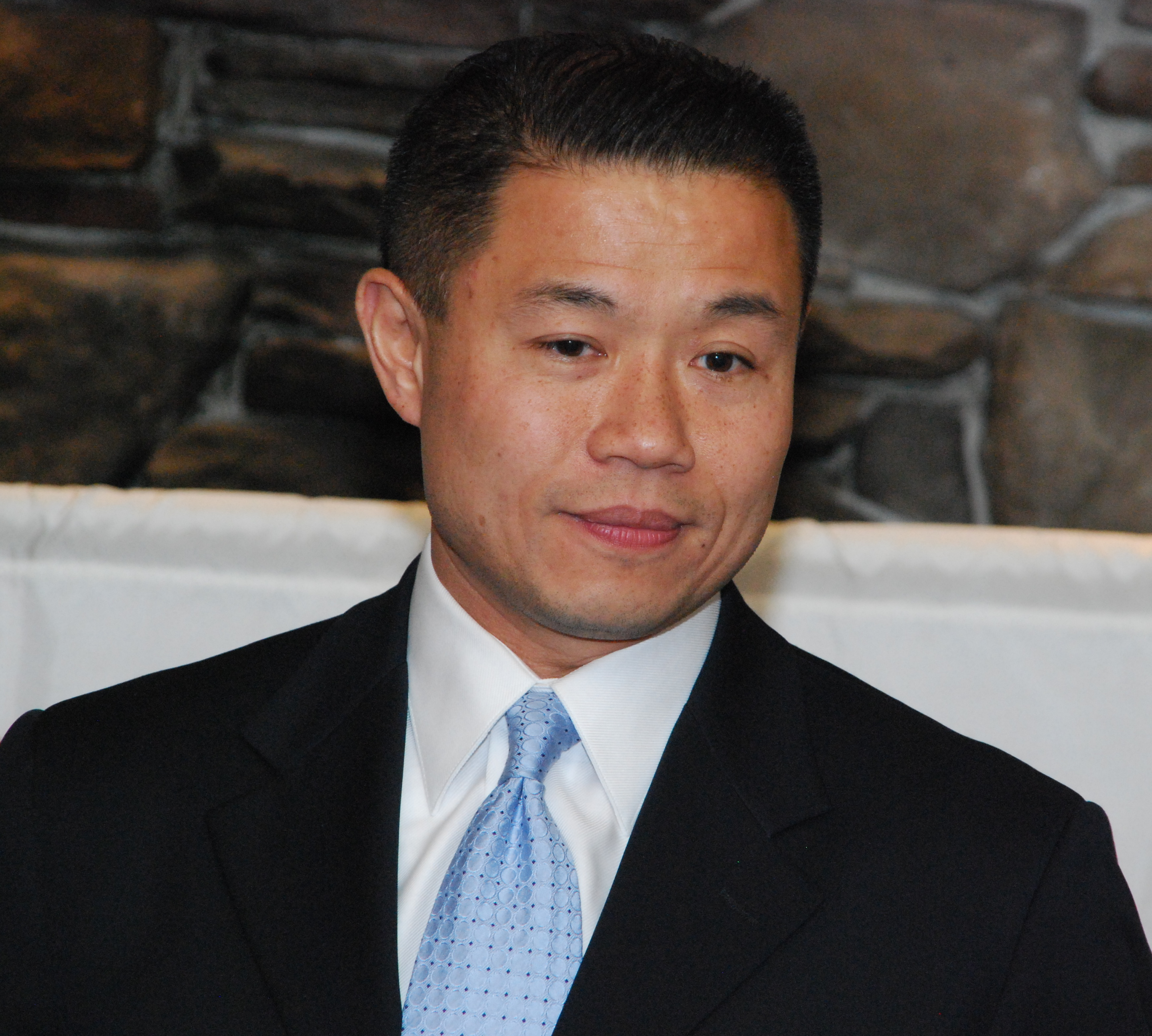
John Liu

The Democratic nominee in the 2009 general election, John Liu, won 76% of the citywide vote on November 3. The Republican nominee, Joseph Mendola, won 19%; the Conservative nominee, Stuart Avrick, 2%; and others 2%.

=== 2013 election ===
Manhattan Borough President Scott Stringer won the September 10, 2013, Democratic primary with 52% of the vote, defeating former New York State Governor Eliot Spitzer, who had been forced to resign as governor over various scandals and who received 48% of the vote. Former Wall Street financier John Burnett was unopposed as the Republican candidate. Hesham El-Meligy, an independent candidate with the support of some Libertarians, was also a candidate for the office. Stringer won the general election with 80% of the vote, as Burnett had 17% of the vote, the Green Party's Julia Willebrand had 2% of the vote, and El-Meligy had 0.5% of the vote.

=== 2017 election ===
In 2017, there was no Democratic primary for the position. Stringer faced Republican Michel Faulkner in the general election, and won, with 77% of the vote.

=== 2021 election ===
The 2021 New York City Comptroller election consisted of Democratic and Republican primaries on June 22, 2021, followed by a general election on November 2, 2021. The primaries were the first Comptroller election primaries to use ranked-choice (instant-runoff) voting. Incumbent Comptroller Scott Stringer was barred from running for a third term by term limits.

Notable candidates included State Senator Brian Benjamin, former US Marine Zach Iscol, City Councilmember Brad Lander, State Senator Kevin Parker, and State Assemblymember David Weprin. A number of other members of the New York City business and political communities also ran.

=== 2025 election ===
The 2025 New York City Comptroller election consisted of Democratic and Republican primaries on June 24, 2025, and a general election scheduled to take place on November 2, 2025. Incumbent Comptroller Brad Lander opted not to run for re-election, instead running in the 2025 New York City Democratic mayoral primary.

Notable candidates for the Democratic nomination included councilmember Justin Brannan, Manhattan Borough President and eventual winner Mark Levine, as well as State Senator Kevin Parker who also ran in 2021.

== Comptrollers ==
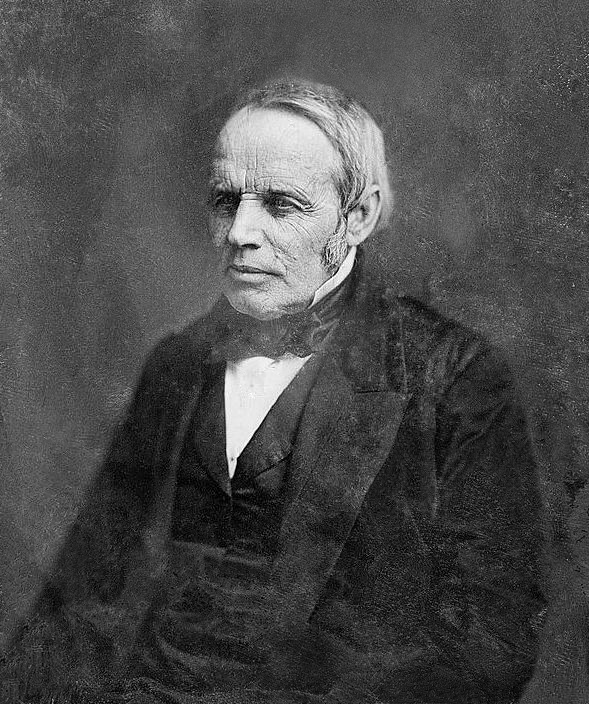
Azariah Cutting Flagg

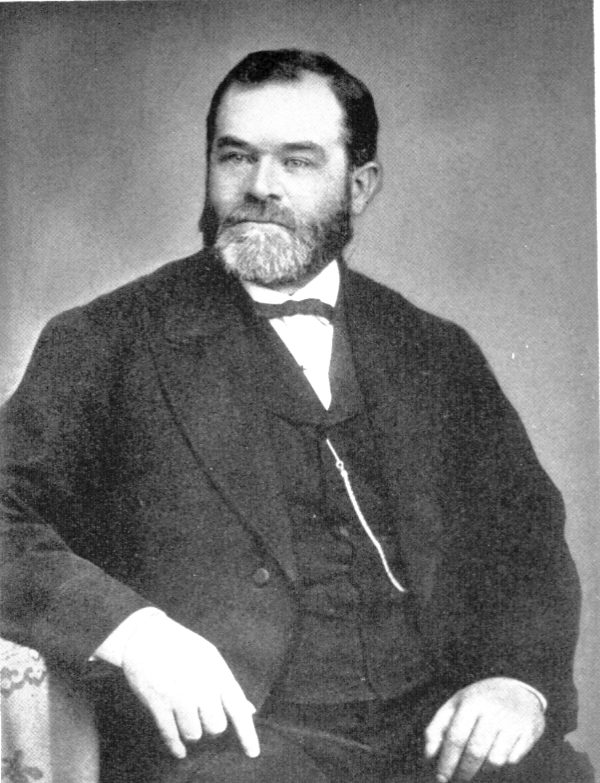
John Kelly

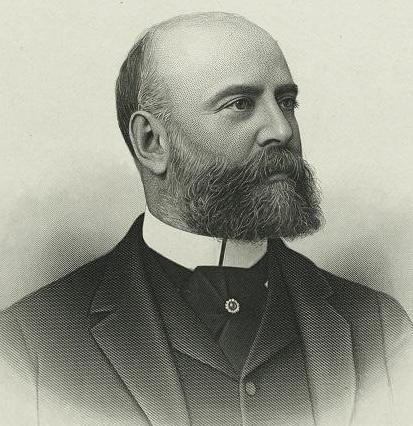
Ashbel Parmelee Fitch

=== Pre-consolidation (1898) ===
- 1802–1805 Selah Strong
- 1805–1806 Benjamin Romaind
- 1806–1807 Isaac Stoutenburg
- 1807 Jacob Morton
- 1808–1813 Garret N. Bleecker
- 1813–1816 Thomas Mercein
- 1816–1831 Garret N. Bleecker
- 1831–1836 Talman J. Waters
- 1836–1839 Douw D. Williamson
- 1839–1842 Alfred A. Smith
- 1842 Douw D. Williamson
- 1843–1844 Alfred A. Smith
- 1844–1845 Douw D. Williamson
- 1845–1848 John Ewen
- 1848–1849 Talman J. Waters
- 1849 John L. Lawrence
- 1850–1853 Joseph R. Taylor
- 1853–1859 Azariah C. Flagg
- 1859–1863 Robert T. Haws
- 1863–1867 Matthew T. Brennan
- 1867–1871 Richard B. Connolly
- 1871–1876 Andrew H. Green
- 1876–1881 John Kelly
- 1881–1883 Allan Campbell
- 1883–1884 S. Hastings Grant
- 1884–1888 Edward V. Loew
- 1888–1894 Theodore W. Myers
- 1894–1898 Ashbel P. Fitch

=== Post-consolidation (1898) ===
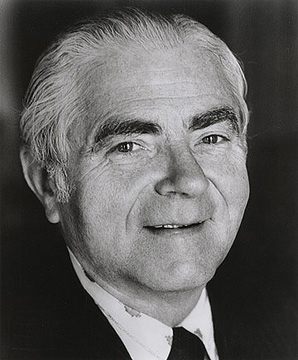
Abe Beame

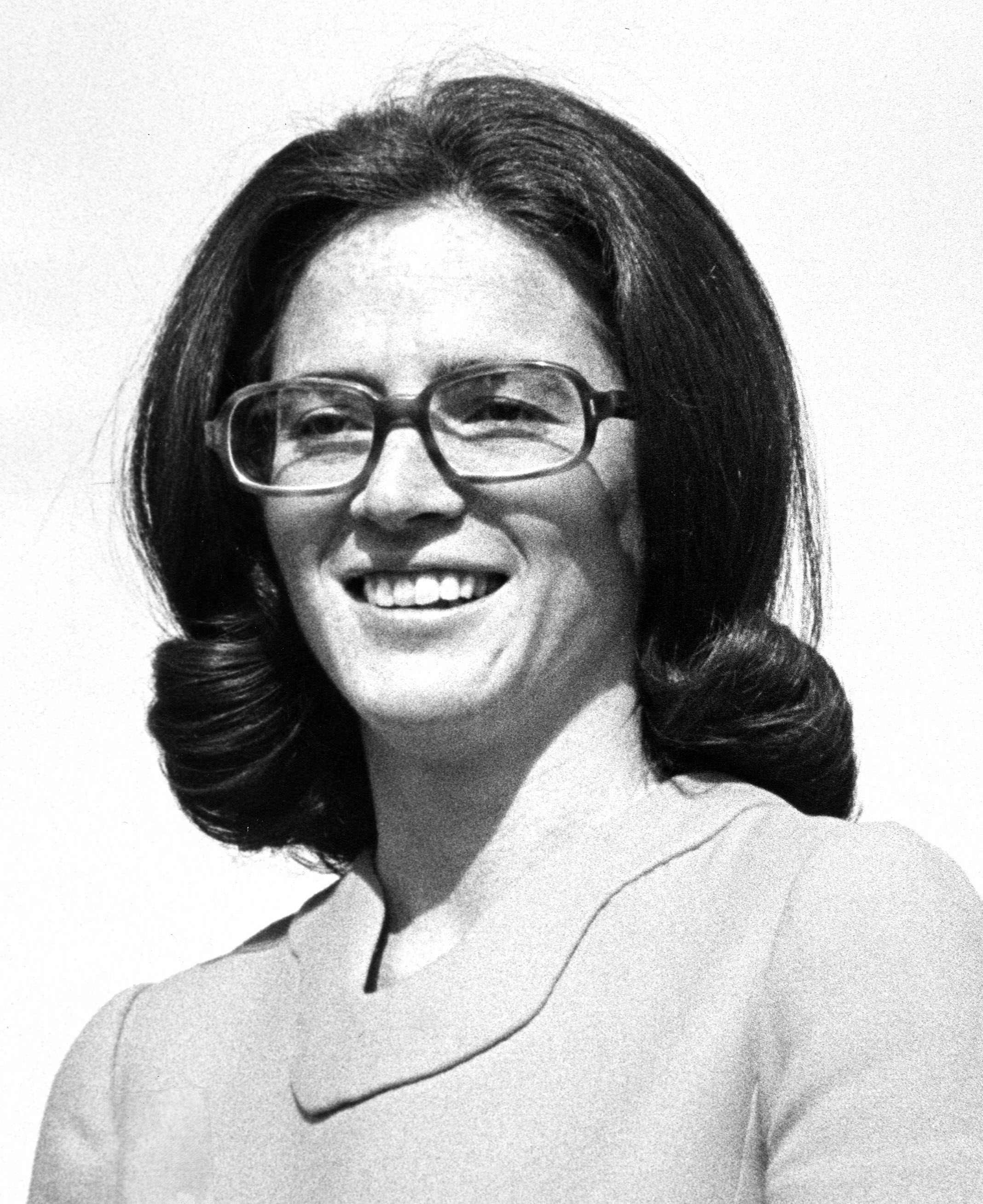
Elizabeth Holtzman

- 1898–1901 Bird S. Coler
- 1902–1905 Edward M. Grout
- 1906–1909 Herman A. Metz
- 1910–1917 William A. Prendergast
- 1918–1925 Charles Lacy Craig
- 1926–1932 Charles W. Berry
- 1933 George McAneny
- 1934 W. Arthur Cunningham
- 1935 Joseph D. McGoldrick
- 1936–1937 Frank J. Taylor
- 1938–1945 Joseph D. McGoldrick
- 1946–1953 Lazarus Joseph
- 1954–1961 Lawrence E. Gerosa
- 1962–1965 Abraham D. Beame
- 1966–1969 Mario Procaccino
- 1970–1973 Abraham D. Beame
- 1974–1989 Harrison J. Goldin
- 1990–1993 Elizabeth Holtzman
- 1994–2001 Alan G. Hevesi
- 2002–2009 William Thompson
- 2010–2013 John Liu
- 2014–2021 Scott Stringer
- 2022–2025 Brad Lander
- 2026–present Mark Levine

== Sources ==
- Article on "comptroller" by Noel C. Garelick in The Encyclopedia of New York City, edited by Kenneth T. Jackson (Yale University Press and The New-York Historical Society, New Haven, Connecticut, 1995; ISBN 0-300-05536-6)
