= Cascadilla School =

Coordinates: 42.442366°N 76.483466°W

- Ithaca, New York

Information
- Type: Private
- Established: 1876
- Headmistress: Patricia T. Kendall
- Grades: 6-12
- Enrollment: 50
- Average class size: 5 students
- Student to teacher ratio: 5:1
- Campus size: 1 acres
- Colors: Green and white
- Mascot: The Gryphon
- Website: http://www.cascadillaschool.org/

Cascadilla School is a co-ed preparatory school in Ithaca, New York, United States. The school was established in 1876 as a tutoring and college preparatory school for Cornell University.

== History ==
It was founded in 1876 as a boys' preparatory school for Cornell University. At this time, Universities typically required students to be proficient in Latin and Greek. However, students from rural areas often did not have access to instruction in these subjects. Some early members of the Cornell faculty became concerned about the quality of education available to such students and founded Cascadilla School to address this inequity. However, students also pursued athletic activities such as football and crew and created yearbooks to record their activities.

Current headmistress Patricia Kendall congratulates a graduating senior of the class of 2005.

Shortly after the First World War, the school fell on hard financial times. They were forced to sell several buildings and parcels of land, including the Cascadilla School Boathouse, which still stands and is the centerpiece of Stewart Park. The building immediately south of the main classroom building once housed the dormitory, a dining hall, and a gymnasium but now has been remodeled to serve as an apartment building and is privately owned and operated.

In the later part of the 20th century, headmaster Maxwell Kendall began to accept female students, created a board of trustees for the school, made Cascadilla independent of (although still affiliated with) Cornell University, obtained accreditation from the New York State Board of Regents, obtained not-for-profit status, and marketed the school to international students with great success.

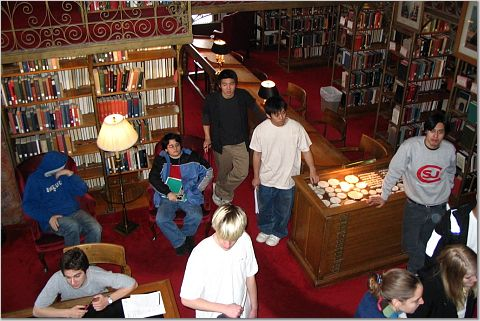
Cascadilla School students make frequent use of the Cornell University libraries for study space and research. As shown here, they receive a special orientation to the library system each year.

His son, John Kendall, a former history and math teacher at the school, later took over as headmaster and successfully opened the school up to students looking for an accelerated approach to their education. The accelerated program allows students to earn one unit of credit in one semester. In 1999 John Kendall's wife, Patricia Kendall, officially became the dean of students, and in 2001, she took over as headmistress, a position in which she serves to this day.

Between 40 and 60 students from ten countries are guided by a faculty of twelve teachers, many of whom hold advanced degrees. Typically, Cascadilla School students go on to four-year colleges such as Binghamton University, Georgetown University, and New York University. By 2015, approximately 3,750 students had attended the Cascadilla School since 1876.

Cascadilla School students are active in the surrounding community. As shown here, two students volunteer at a local day care center. Community service is a special focus of the school.

== Athletics ==
Cascadilla offers its students three athletic programs:

- Equestrian Club (The Hippogriffs)
- Ski Club
- Soccer (The Gryphons)

== Notable alumni ==
- Hermann Biggs, physician and pioneer in the field of public health (Student, 1879)
- John L. Collyer, businessman and chairman of the Board of Trustees at Cornell University; served as chairman, president, and CEO at B. F. Goodrich (Class of 1913)
- Adolph Coors II, businessman who served as president at Coors Brewing Company; son of Adolph Coors (Class of 1903)
- Charles B. King, entrepreneur and engineer who was the first person in Detroit to design, build, and drive a self-propelled automobile
- John M. Olin, businessman and philanthropist; son of Franklin W. Olin (Class of 1909)
- Spencer T. Olin, businessman and philanthropist; son of Franklin W. Olin (Class of 1917)
- Henry Schoellkopf, football player at Cornell University and Harvard University; head football coach at Cornell from 1907 to 1908
- Walter Wanger, film producer and movie executive during the Golden Age of Hollywood (Class of 1912)
