= Frank L. Dowling =

American politician from New York (1865-1919)

8th Manhattan Borough President
- In office January 1, 1918 – September 27, 1919
- Preceded by: Marcus M. Marks
- Succeeded by: Michael F. Loughman (Acting)

6th President of the New York City Board of Aldermen
- In office February 1, 1916 – December 31, 1917
- Preceded by: George McAneny
- Succeeded by: Al Smith

Personal details
- Born: 1865
- Died: September 27, 1919 (aged 53–54) New York City, U.S.
- Political party: Democratic
- Children: 3

Frank L. Dowling (1865 – September 27, 1919) was an American politician who served as the 8th Manhattan Borough President as a member of the Democratic Party from January 1, 1918, until his death in office on September 27, 1919.

== Political career & death ==
Dowling was first elected on November 7, 1916, as the 7th President of the New York City Board of Aldermen with 308,687 votes or 48.76% in a four-person race, with his closest opponent Republican candidate Henry H. Curran receiving 274,945 votes or 43.43%, thereby gaining Democratic control over the presidency. Dowling was sworn in on January 1, 1917, and held the position for a year before being elected Manhattan Borough President on November 6, 1917, with 110,179 votes or 47% in a six-person race, defeating incumbent Republican Borough President Marcus M. Marks by 23,845 votes or 10.17%. Dowling served as Borough President from January 1, 1918, until his death in office of pneumonia on September 27, 1919, in New York City.

Dowling was buried on October 1, 1919, in Calvary Cemetery in Queens, New York. A monument was erected in Dowling's memory in Chelsea Park, Manhattan in 1926.

Political offices
Preceded by Marcus M. Marks	Manhattan Borough President; 1918-1919	Succeeded by Michael F. Loughman (Acting)
