= Cascadilla School Boathouse =

- U.S. National Register of Historic Places
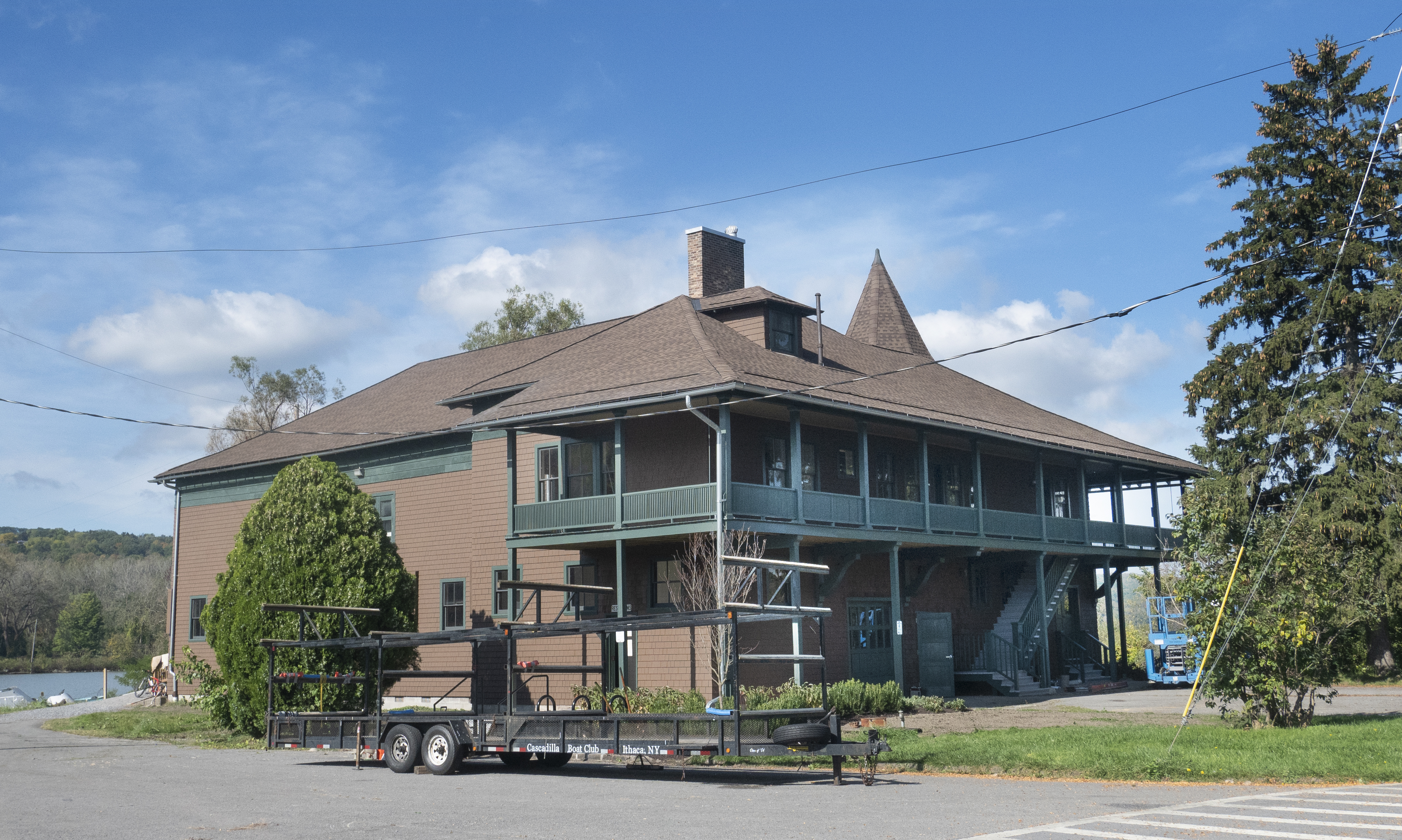

- Location within New York Location within the United States
- Location: S. shore of Cayuga Lake at the mouth of Fall Cr., Stewart Park, Ithaca, New York
- Coordinates: 42°27′37″N 76°30′33″W
- Area: Less than one acre
- Built: 1894
- Architect: Vivian & Gibb; Et al.
- Architectural style: Shingle style
- NRHP reference No.: 91001498
- Added to NRHP: October 04, 1991

Cascadilla School Boathouse is a historic boathouse located in Stewart Park, a municipal park operated by the City of Ithaca in Tompkins County, New York. The shingle style boathouse was built by the Cascadilla School from 1894 to 1896 as a structure to store boats and lies on the south end of Cayuga Lake. Crew rowing was extremely popular in the late 1800s, with the first World Rowing Federation annual international event taking place in 1893. The boathouse has been in continuous use for rowing storage, training, lessons, and meetings by the Cascadilla Boat Club.

It was listed on the National Register of Historic Places in 1991.

The Cascadilla Boat Club currently leases portions of the boathouse from the City of Ithaca. Continuing to use the boathouse for its original purpose, the club runs a competitive scholastic rowing program and youth and adult learn-to-row classes from April through October. Cascadilla Boat Club is a not-for-profit organization founded in 1977 with the mission of making the sport of rowing available to the entire Ithaca area community.
