= George McAneny =

American newspaperman and municipal reformer

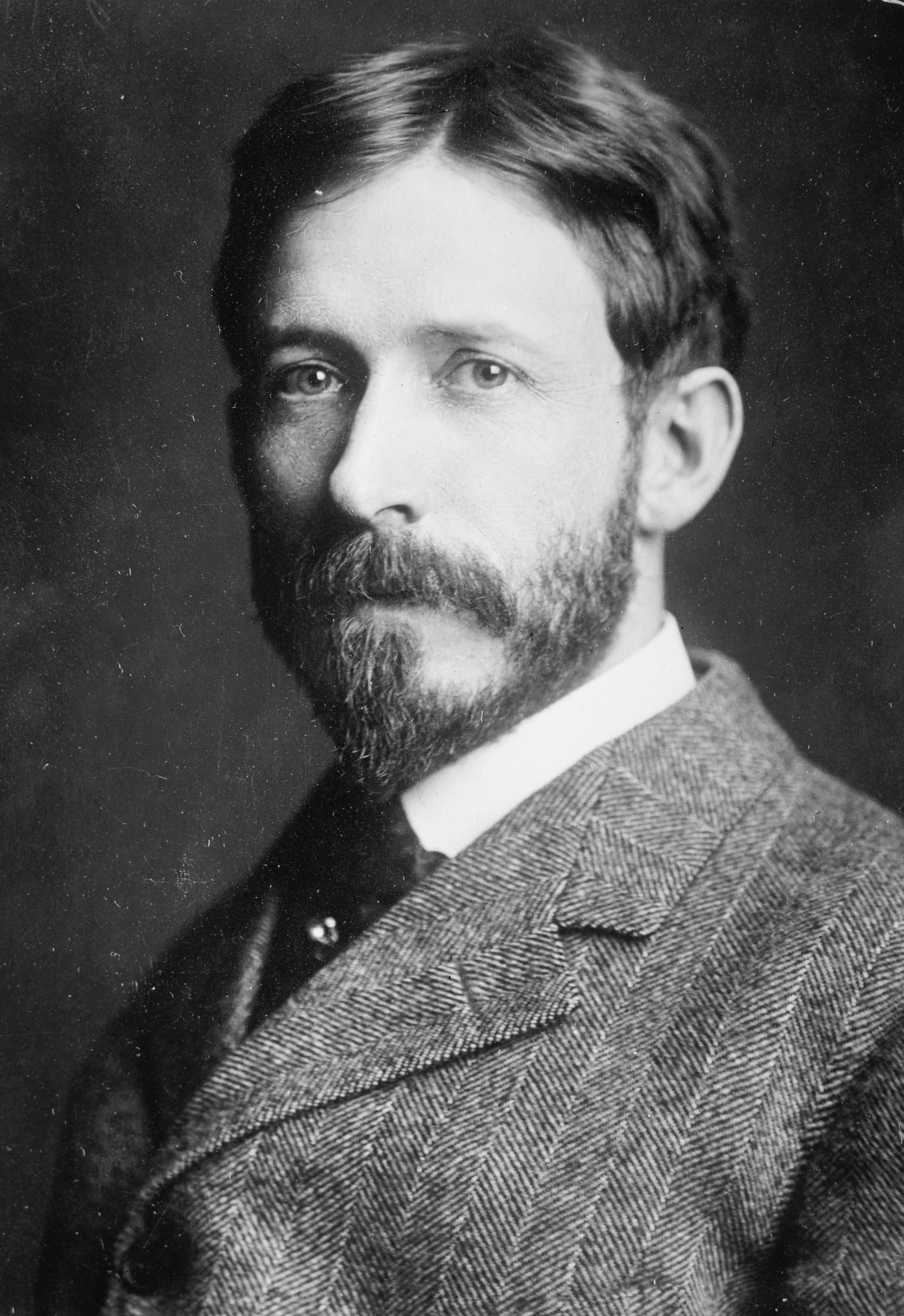

6th Manhattan Borough President
- In office January 1, 1910 – December 31, 1913
- Preceded by: John Cloughen
- Succeeded by: Marcus M. Marks

5th President of the New York City Board of Aldermen
- In office January 1, 1914 – February 1, 1916
- Preceded by: Ardolph Loges Kline
- Succeeded by: Frank L. Dowling

35th New York City Comptroller
- In office 1933
- Preceded by: Charles W. Berry
- Succeeded by: Arthur Cunningham

Personal details
- Born: December 24, 1869 Jersey City, New Jersey, U.S.
- Died: July 29, 1953 (aged 83) Princeton, New Jersey, U.S.
- Party: Democratic
- Profession: newspaperman, public official

George McAneny (December 24, 1869 – July 29, 1953), was an American newspaperman, municipal reformer and advocate of preservation and city planning from New York City. He served as Manhattan Borough President from 1910 to 1913, President of the New York City Board of Aldermen from 1914 to 1916, and New York City Comptroller in 1933. He also held several other positions throughout his career, serving as an executive officer of the New York City Civil Service Commission in 1902, secretary of the New York Civil Service Reform League (1894–1902), executive manager of The New York Times (1916–1921), and president of the Regional Plan Association (1930–1940).

== Biography ==
McAneny was born on December 24, 1869, in Greenville, New Jersey, the son of George Francis and Katharine (Dillaway) McAneny. He graduated from Jersey City High School (since renamed as William L. Dickinson High School) and then reported for The New York World, supporting civil service, city planning and a Bureau of Municipal Research. At different times later in his career he was executive secretary of the New York Civil Service Commission and secretary of the New York Civil Service Reform League (1894–1902). On January 4, 1900, he was married to Marjorie Jacobi, daughter of Mary Putnam and Abraham Jacobi, and with her had six children: Ruth, Herbert, Arnold, Ernst, Elizabeth, and David.

While president of the City Club of New York from 1906 to 1909, he served on the city's charter review commission (1908). He was elected on fusion tickets as Manhattan Borough President in 1909 and as President of the New York City Board of Aldermen in 1913, serving from that position for several months as acting mayor in place of John Purroy Mitchel.

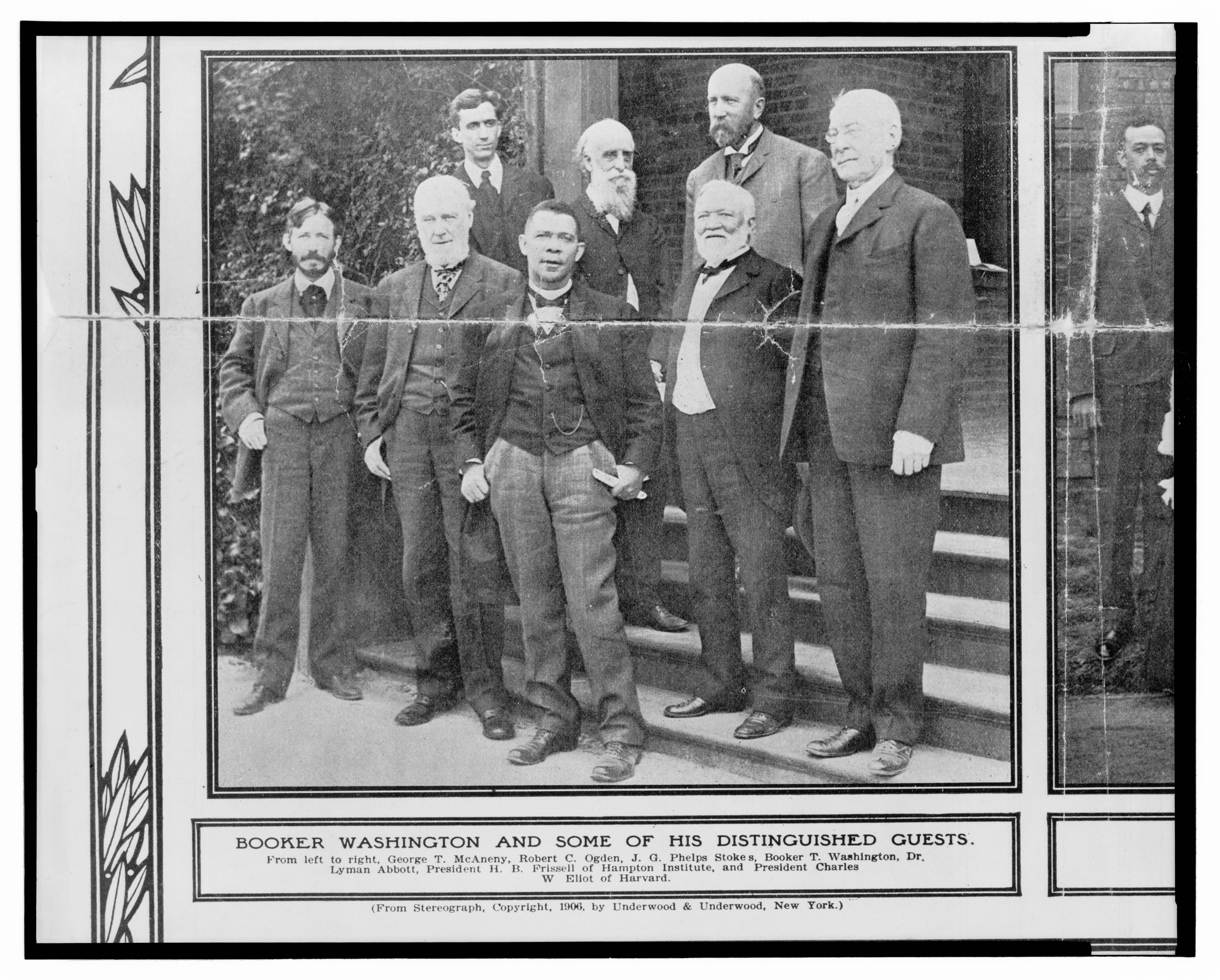
With Booker Washington and other dignitaries

From 1916 to 1921, he was the executive manager of The New York Times and from 1921 to 1926, he chaired the New York State Transit Commission. In 1933, he served briefly as New York City Comptroller before becoming President of the Title Guarantee and Trust Company (1934–1936). After 1920, McAneny was active in several other fields of interest, including city and regional planning (as the first president of the Regional Plan Association from 1930 to 1942), sanitation (at one point as the city's Commissioner of Sanitation), landmarks preservation (as president of the American Scenic and Historic Preservation Society from 1942 to 1950), and preparing the 1939 New York World's Fair as chairman of the World's Fair Commission from 1935 to 1936.

He died in Princeton, New Jersey on July 29, 1953.

== Accomplishments ==
In 1911, McAneny became the chairman of a new transit committee of the Board of Estimate. He and the other members worked out a complex compromise with the state Public Service Commission, which had to authorize the franchises, and the railroad companies. Several lines would run through the densest part of Manhattan's core, where high ridership was assured, but they would link to a dozen new and expanded lines running to less developed areas of the outer boroughs. Control of the new lines would be split, and in some cases shared, between the IRT (Interborough Rapid Transit Company) and the BRT (Brooklyn Rapid Transit Company, later reconstructed into the BMT or Brooklyn–Manhattan Transit Corporation). This arrangement, which became known as the Dual Contracts, was approved by the New York Public Service Commission in 1913, while McAneny and his fellow Fusionists were preparing to run for re-election. Over the succeeding years, this plan would result in the extension of subway lines to far-flung areas of the Bronx, Brooklyn, and Queens, making land accessible for lower-density development that would help disperse the congested population of the inner city.

McAneny was the driving force behind the city's 1916 comprehensive zoning resolution, which for the first time provided residential neighborhoods with the possibility of legal protection against land-use change. He supported the Fifth Avenue Association, a business group that advocated for zoning to stabilize land values, and created the committees of the Board of Estimate that would develop the resolution. Edward M. Bassett, who served on one of McAneny's committees and later became one of the nation's foremost zoning experts, called McAneny the "father of zoning in this country." McAneny and reformers with the most comprehensive view of city planning advanced regulatory schemes that would limit the height and bulk of buildings, occasionally going so far as to propose architectural review of exterior facades. They promoted a concept known as excess condemnation, which would have allowed the city to capitalize on its own infrastructure investments by acquiring more land than needed for new streets and subways and in order to consolidate small parcels and sell them for redevelopment at higher values. Even more sweepingly, they sought to decongest the tenement districts and promote the development of suburban housing for the masses by building rapid-transit lines into heretofore rural areas of the outer boroughs, where private developers would build new, more salubrious housing for workers.

As Manhattan Borough President, George McAneny helped secure funding from the philanthropist Olivia Slocum Sage for the restoration of New York's historic City Hall, built in 1811. He also brokered a plan that prevented City Hall from being overshadowed by a massive new courthouse in City Hall Park. Due to McAneny's efforts, the new building was eventually constructed several blocks north instead. In addition to protecting views of City Hall, McAneny's plan inadvertently saved the now-landmarked Tweed Courthouse, which would have been demolished under the original proposal.

Also during his time in office as the Manhattan Borough President McAneny spearheaded a street widening project. Unlike earlier street widening campaigns that had used eminent domain to claim property, the widenings of 1909 to 1912 mostly did not seek to condemn private property and enlarge the rights-of-way of the avenues. Instead, the method was to widen the roadways within the existing rights-of-way by reallocating space from the sidewalk to the roadway and, where possible, to compensate for some of the lost sidewalk by removing structures and architectural projections from the remaining sidewalk area.

McAneny spearheaded a plan to extend Seventh Avenue south through Greenwich Village and connect it with Varick Street, which would itself be widened. The Seventh Avenue extension alone destroyed over 250 historic buildings in the West Village. The Varick Street widening threatened St. John's Chapel, a beloved city landmark dating to 1822. (Trinity Church, which owned the chapel, had wanted to raze it for years in spite of community opposition, and the widening provided a convenient excuse to do so). When preservationists raised an outcry, McAneny tasked his newly formed Committee on the City Plan with negotiating a solution that would allocate city funds to shore up the chapel and turn it over to a community group. Unfortunately, McAneny left office before the compromise was executed, and in 1918 Trinity demolished the chapel, which was replaced with a modern post office.

In 1939, McAneny helped convince the Secretary of the Interior, Harold Ickes, to designate an 1830s neoclassical building that stood on the site where George Washington had been inaugurated as president in 1789, as a national historic shrine. It was the first historic building in a major city to be so designated under the 1935 Historic Sites Act. On the sesquicentennial of the Washington's inauguration, McAneny personally announced the designation from the steps of Federal Hall National Memorial. He then became chairman of the Federal Hall Memorial Associates, a group that operated a historical museum in the building.

McAneny successfully faced down Robert Moses in two related preservation battles. As president of the Regional Plan Association, he forcefully advocated against the construction of one of Moses's pet projects, a gigantic Brooklyn–Battery Bridge from the toe of Manhattan to Brooklyn that would have overshadowed Battery Park and blocked views of New York Harbor. Due to the persistence of McAneny and his colleagues, the federal government refused to allow the bridge and the Brooklyn–Battery Tunnel was built instead. The outcome enraged Moses, who had called McAneny "an extinct volcano" and "an exhumed mummy" in a public hearing on the bridge plan.

Moses, as Parks Commissioner, then determined to demolish the Battery's historic fort, which at the time was being used as a public aquarium, supposedly because tunnel construction would undermine its foundations, but more likely simply to take revenge against the preservationists. McAneny, who in 1942 became president of New York's main preservation society, assembled a group of leading citizens to battle Moses in the courts, in the press, and in federal, state, and local legislative bodies. Although the city government was in thrall to Moses, McAneny's group took him to court to prevent him from proceeding with the demolition. Meanwhile, drawing on his contacts in the National Park Service, with whom he had worked on Federal Hall, McAneny was able to muster federal support for saving the fort and obtained a commitment of funds from the U.S. Congress. In 1949 the city and state finally agreed to transfer the structure to the federal government, and the fort, now known as Castle Clinton, was preserved and restored as a national historic site.

During the Castle Clinton campaign, McAneny and his National Park Service contacts began to develop an idea for a new organization that would be able to draw on private resources to preserve historic buildings nationwide. In 1947 McAneny became the chairman of the new group, called the National Council on Historic Sites and Buildings, which, on McAneny's initiative, organized the National Trust for Historic Preservation.

In the late 1940s, McAneny spoke out against plans to demolish the historic Federal-style townhouses that lined Washington Square North. His activism foretold a shift in the overall focus of the preservation movement, which by the end of the 1950s would be deeply engaged in protecting the character of the city's historic neighborhoods.

== Awards ==
Throughout his life and civic career, George McAneny was the recipient of multiple awards and served on multiple committees, the following is a list of some of the many accomplishments which have been recognized:

- 1913 – Société des architectes diplômés par le gouvernement: Medal presented in recognition in his services as laymen in the cause of architectural advancement.
- 1939 – American Institute of Architects: McAneny was awarded the first Medal of Honor for City Planning in November 1939 for distinguished contribution for the planning of the City of New York.
- 1945 – American Scenic and Historic Preservation Society: George McAneny Medal for Outstanding Leadership in Historic Preservation. This medal is now under the purview of the United States National Park Foundation.
- 1948 – Saint Nicholas Society: The Saint Nicholas Society Medal of Merit was established in 1934 to be awarded to a citizen of New York for outstanding ability and service to the City of New York. It was first awarded in 1937 and presented to George McAneny in 1948. Other notable recipients of this award were Fiorello H. LaGuardia(1945), John D. Rockefeller Jr. (1947), and David Rockefeller (1956).
- 1949 – Empire State Minute Men: The Chauncey M. Depew Medal
- 1953 – U.S. Department of the Interior: The Conservation Service Award was established to give honorary recognition to organizations, groups or individuals not eligible to receive department honor awards under the regular program, It is granted to groups or individuals who perform outstanding and direct service to the department in the field of conservation, cf a type and quality that would serve as a basis for a Distinguished Service Award if performed by an employee of the department.

== Legacy ==
McAneny's contributions to zoning in the city and the expansion of the subway system together helped shape new neighborhoods in Queens, Brooklyn, and the Bronx. This in turn helped in avoiding the repetitive pattern of overcrowding within the older parts of the city. New York's zoning resolution of 1916 was also generally considered a paradigm in terms of city zoning and was imitated by many other cities across the United States.

George McAneny's daughter, Ruth McAneny Loud, would carry on the preservation torch after his death. She became involved in the Municipal Art Society and served as its first woman president beginning in 1965.

Political offices
Preceded by John Cloughen (Dec. 1910)	Borough President of Manhattan; 1910–1913	Succeeded by Marcus M. Marks (1914–1917)
Preceded by Ardolph L. Kline (1913)	President of the New York City Board of Aldermen; January 1914–February 1916	Succeeded by Frank L. Dowling (1916–1917)
Preceded by Charles W. Berry (1926–1932)	New York City Comptroller; 1933	Succeeded by W. Arthur Cunningham (1934)
