= Ruth McAneny Loud =

American arts administrator

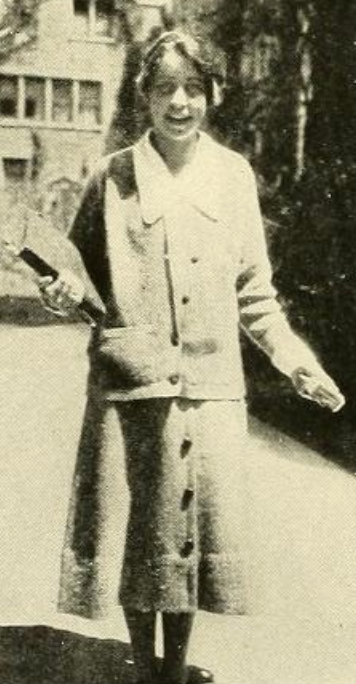
- Ruth McAneny (later Loud), from the yearbook of Bryn Mawr College
- Born: Ruth Putnam McAneny; March 9, 1901; New York City, United States
- Died: December 31, 1990 (aged 89); New York City, United States
- Occupations: Arts administrator, educator
- Parent: George McAneny
- Relatives: Abraham Jacobi (grandfather); Mary Corinna Putnam Jacobi (grandmother)

Ruth Putnam McAneny Loud (March 9, 1901 – December 31, 1990) was an American arts administrator, educator, and civic leader. She was the first woman to serve as president of the Municipal Art Society.

== Early life and education ==
Ruth McAneny was born in New York City, the daughter of George McAneny and Marjorie Jacobi McAneny. Her father was a newspaperman, politician, and urban planner. Her maternal grandparents, Abraham Jacobi and Mary Putnam Jacobi, were noted physicians. She graduated from the Brearley School and from Bryn Mawr College in 1923.

== Career ==
Loud taught at her alma mater, The Brearley School, from 1929 to 1946. She co-wrote a guide to traveling in New York City with children, published in 1946 as a fundraiser for a Brearley School scholarship. After leaving the classroom, she was director of development at the Museum of the City of New York.

Loud joined the Metropolitan Art Society in 1954, after her father's death, to take up some of his work on architectural preservation. She became the first woman elected president of the Municipal Art Society in 1965, and remained in that position until 1970; she served on the society's board of directors for the rest of her life.

== Publications ==
- New York! New York! A Knickerbocker Holiday for You and Your Children (1946, with Agnes Adams Wales)

== Personal life ==
McAneny married Henry Sherman Loud in 1924. They had two children, Roger and Margaret. The Louds divorced in 1944. She died from complications following surgery in 1990, at the age of 89, in New York City.
