= Preventorium =

Former type of health facility

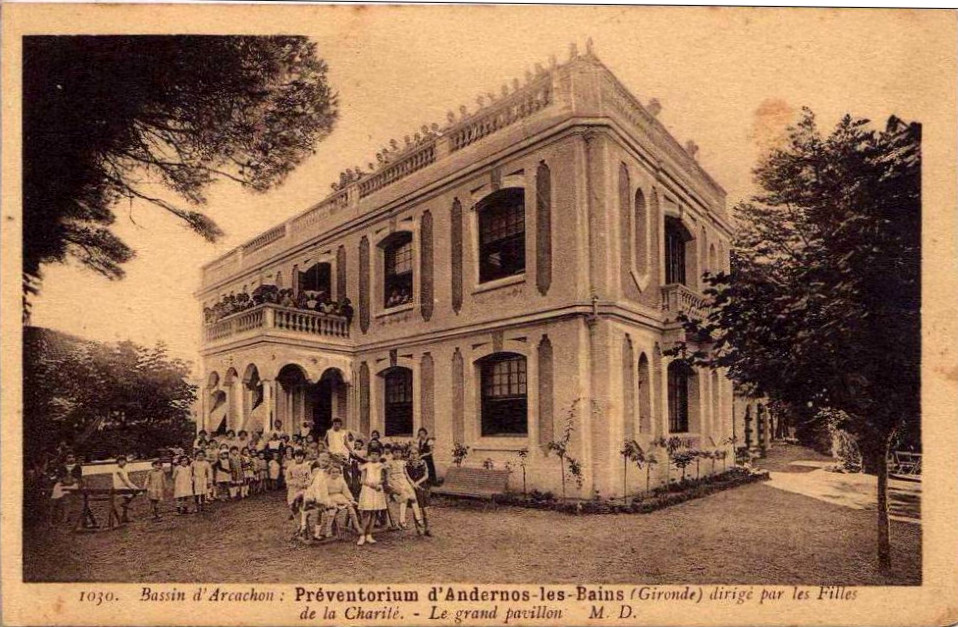

A preventorium was an institution or building for patients infected with tuberculosis who did not yet have an active form of the disease. Popular in the early 20th century, preventoria were designed to isolate these patients from uninfected individuals as well as patients who showed outward symptoms. Philanthropist Nathan Straus opened the first preventorium (Tuberculosis Preventorium for Children) on Preventorium Road in Lakewood, New Jersey in 1909.

== See also ==
- Pest house
- Quarantine
- Sanatorium
