= Stewart Park (Ithaca, New York) =

American municipal park

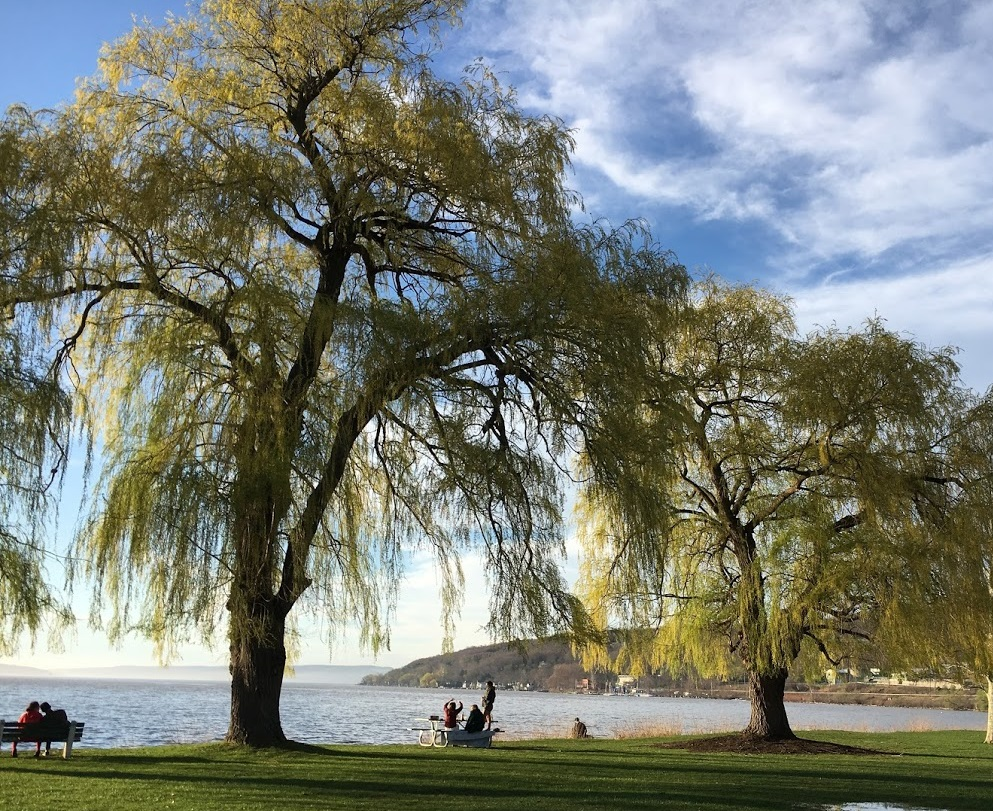
- Willow trees line the Cayuga Lake shoreline in Stewart Park

- Location within New York
- Type: Urban park
- Location: Ithaca, New York
- Coordinates: 42°27′40″N 76°30′13″W
- Created: 1921
- Operator: City of Ithaca
- Open: All year
- Website: www.cityofithaca.org/516/Stewart-Park

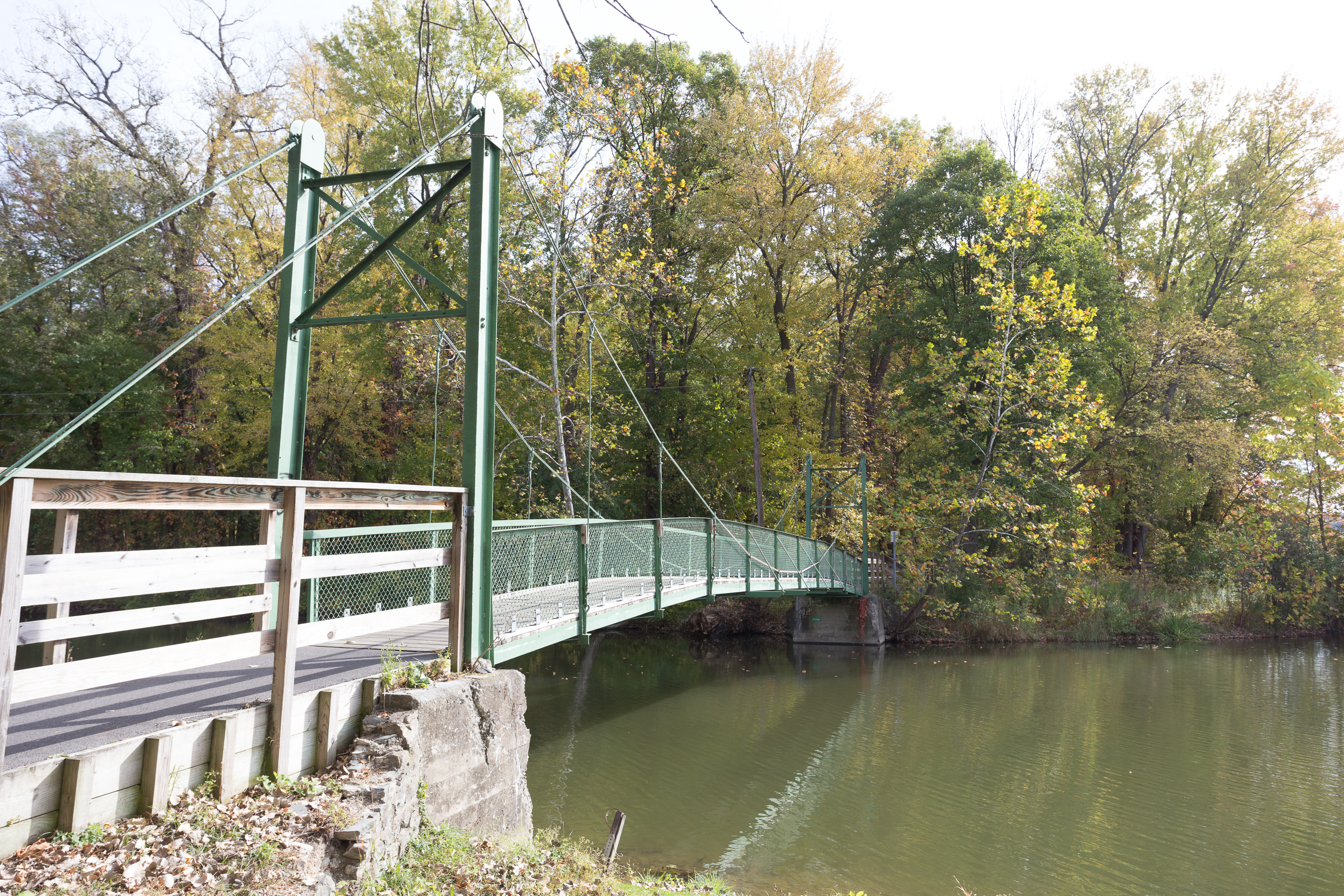
Footbridge

Cascadilla Boathouse c. 1895

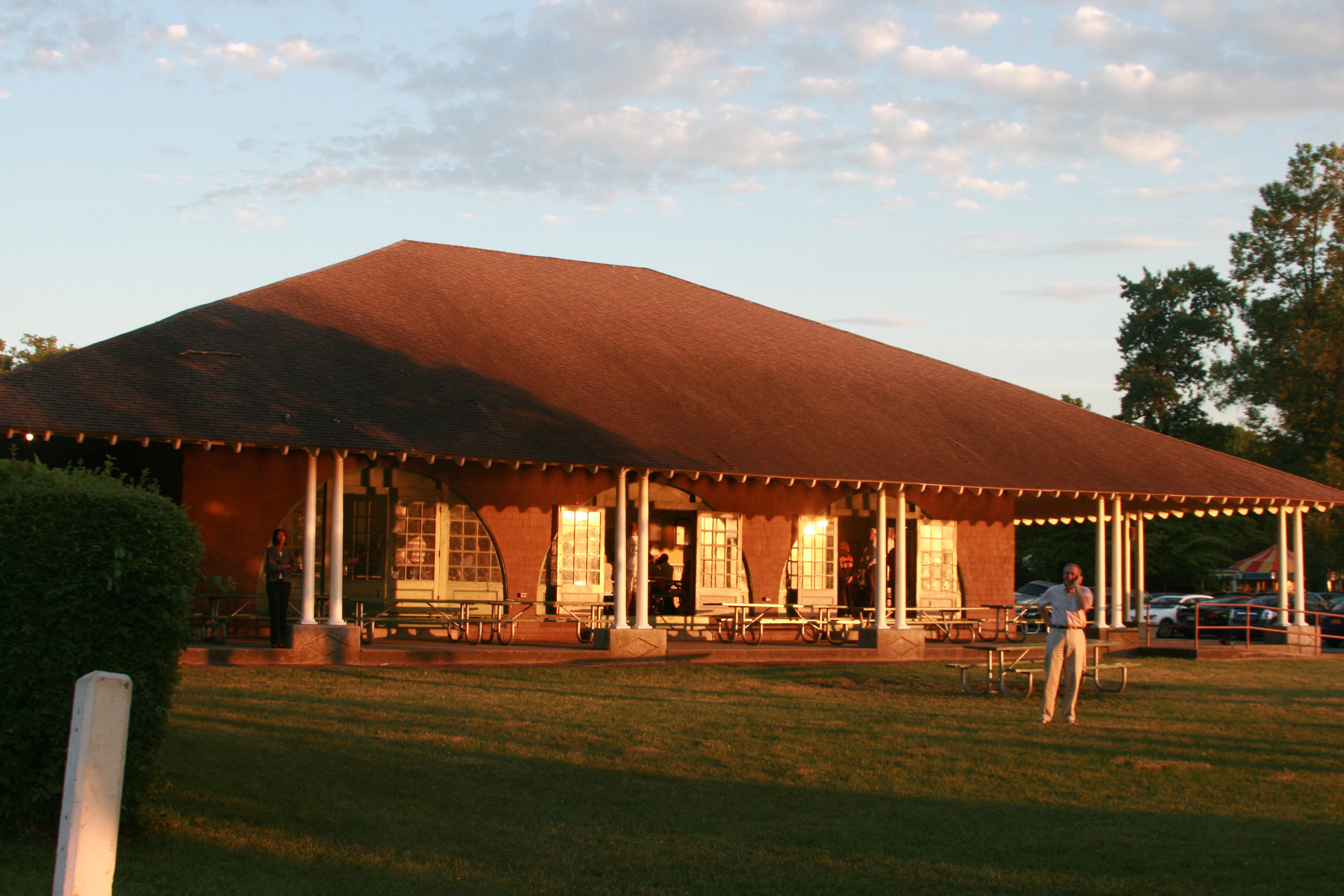
Picnic Pavilion (built in 1895, restored in 2019)

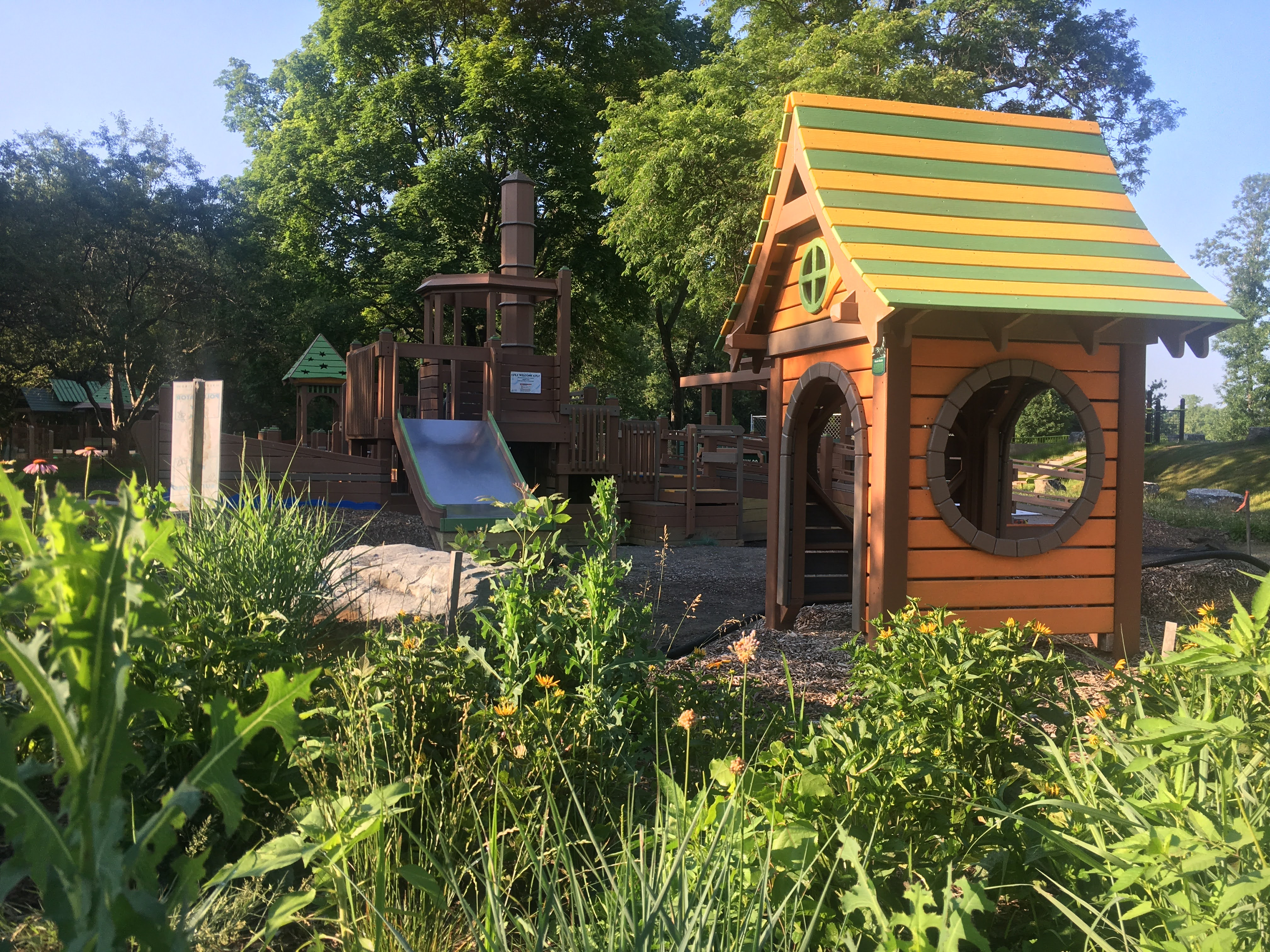
A garden of pollinator plants grows near the accessible playground in Stewart Park. The Trolley, Steamship, and film studio structures on the preschool section reference park history.

Stewart Park is a municipal park operated by the City of Ithaca, New York on the southern end of Cayuga Lake, the largest of New York's Finger Lakes.

== Park description ==
Stewart Park offers space and facilities for outdoor recreation such as frisbee, tennis, basketball, paddling, and fishing. The park has a carousel that operates throughout the summer. There is an expansive, accessible playground that includes features to make it easier for children with wheelchairs or mobility aids to play, along with a splash pad fountain that runs in summer. Picnic tables and grills are spread throughout the park, and sheltered areas for picnics and large gatherings are available for rental. The wide, flat ADA compliant Cayuga Waterfront Trail runs through the park.

Fall Creek empties into Cayuga Lake through Stewart Park. Stewart Park is also the location of the Cascadilla Boat Club's boathouse, commonly called the Cascadilla Boathouse. The Fuertes Bird Sanctuary and Renwick Wildwood are popular locations for birdwatching within Stewart Park. Newman Golf Course, the City of Ithaca's municipal golf course, is technically part of Stewart Park's 177 acres (72 ha).

== History ==
Before the North American continent had been settled by Europeans, the indigenous peoples of the Cayuga Nation founded the village of Neodakheat in the area where Stewart Park is now located. The land became Military Lot 88, 600-acre (240 ha), a tract of land granted to Andrew Moody after the end of the Revolutionary War. Moody sold the land to James Renwick on December 12, 1790. It remained in his family for 104 years as an undeveloped parcel of land.

In the early 1890s, 40 acres (16 ha) of Renwick land was purchased by the Cascadilla School to build athletic facilities. At the same time, a trolley line leading to Cayuga Lake was constructed by the Cayuga Lake Electric Railway Company, later absorbed by Ithaca Street Railway, who also set about developing an amusement park near the lake. The group of properties became known as Renwick Park and opened to the public in 1894.

Upon opening, the trolley park contained a zoo, a merry-go-round, a restaurant pavilion, and a dance pavilion, which became Ithaca's first vaudeville theater. However, in 1908, a decrease in the public's use of the railway system led to the dissolution of the Cayuga Lake Electric Railway Company; the company was replaced by the Renwick Park and Traffic Association. Trolley access to the park was completely discontinued in 1915, and the park closed.

Fifty-five acres (22 ha) adjacent to the park were set aside as a bird sanctuary maintained by the Cayuga Bird Club, now known as Renwick Wildwood. Another birding location around the “swan pond” near the Cascadilla Boathouse is known as the Fuertes Bird Sanctuary. It was named after famous ornithologist and Cayuga Bird Club president Louis Agassiz Fuertes upon his death in 1927.

The park land was leased to Theodore and Leopold Wharton, forming the Wharton Studio during Ithaca's brief heyday as a silent film production center from 1915 to 1919.

In 1920, Mayor Edwin C. Stewart declared during his inauguration speech that it was a "travesty" that Ithaca residents couldn't enjoy the lake without trespassing on private property. In 1921, the City of Ithaca purchased the former Renwick Park land and opened it to the public. Mayor Stewart died before the official opening of the park on July 4, 1921, leaving the city $150,000 for the park. Renwick Park was renamed Stewart Park in his honor.

In 1934, the park's land was raised by several feet to reduce flooding. Although swimming had previously been allowed at the park, a prohibition against swimming has been strongly enforced since 1964. The ban came about after a boy drowned when turbid, sediment-laden water prevented lifeguards from seeing him. Conditions particular to the lake, including the quantity of sediment at the lake's bottom and the prevailing currents at the lake's southern end, cause such murky and turbid conditions to be common, necessitating the ban on swimming.

=== 21st Century ===
A section of the Cayuga Waterfront Trail was completed in 2010, linking the Farmers Market at Steamboat Landing to the Visitors Center. This portion of the trail winds through Stewart Park. In 2011, the Friends of Stewart Park began a wide-ranging rehabilitation and restoration project. A new Inclusive and Accessible Playground was opened summer of 2020. A series of severe thunderstorms during the summer of 2021 caused "devastating" damage to Stewart Park and Newman Golf Course. At least a dozen trees were downed, including some of the park's willow trees. The Cayuga Waterfront Trail, playground, tennis court, sprinklers were damaged and were briefly closed for cleanup.

== Historic buildings and landmarks of Stewart Park ==
The park was listed on the National Register of Historic Places in 2023.

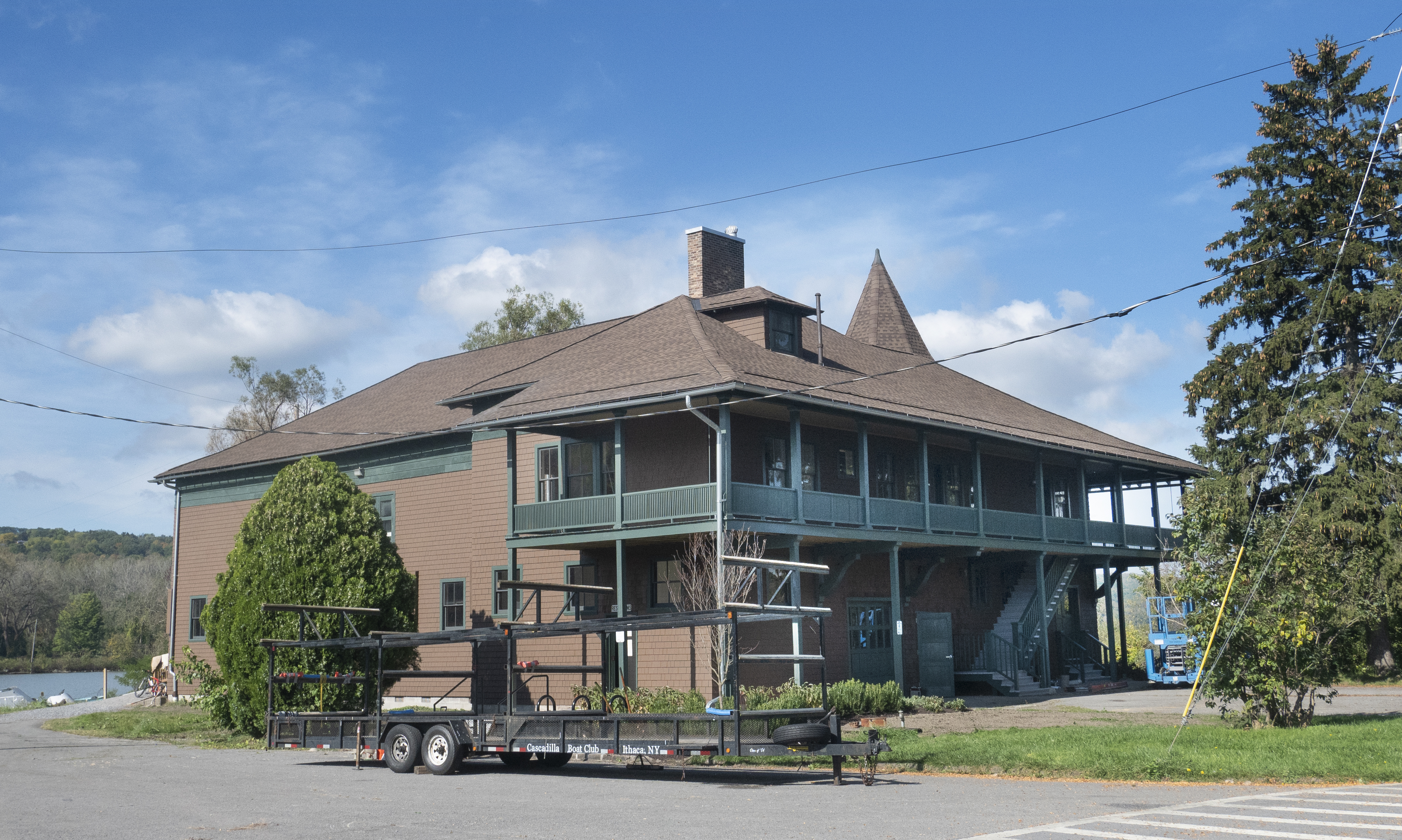
Cascadilla Boathouse

- Cascadilla Boathouse - Designed by architects Clinton L. Vivian and Arthur Gibb and built starting in 1894, the building has been in near continuous use since that time and is still used today by the Cascadilla Boat Club rowing organization. The boathouse was added to the National Register of Historic Places in 1991.

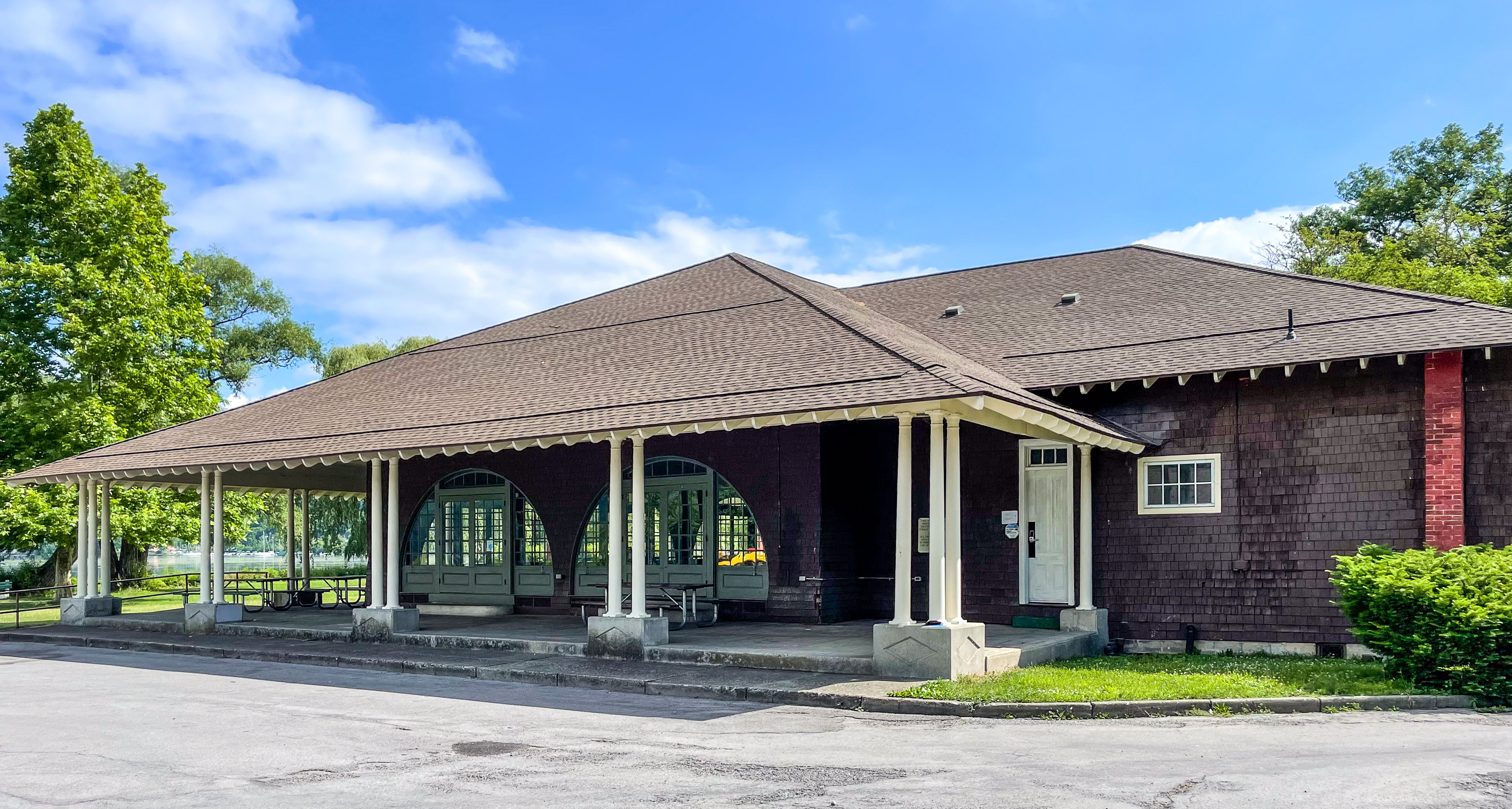
Picnic Pavilion

- Large Picnic Pavilion - Designed by architects Clinton L. Vivian and Arthur Gibb, apprentices to prominent Ithaca architect William Henry Miller, the Picnic Pavilion was constructed around 1895 as part of an Italianate-inspired architectural theme, with peristyle columned porch and semi-circular door and window features. Originally called the Restaurant Pavilion, the Picnic Pavilion was most recently restored in 2019. It is available for rent through the City of Ithaca.
- Small Tea Pavilion - Designed by Clinton L. Vivian and Arthur Gibb and originally built in 1895, the Tea Pavilion once served as the welcoming point for visitors to the park, and was the last stop on the trolley ride to Renwick Park from downtown Ithaca. The open-air pavilion was moved several times within the park but landed in its current location in the 1950s when the playground and carousel were installed. By 2011 the building had fallen into disrepair. The original structure was torn down but was rebuilt to its original design. It is available for rent through the City of Ithaca.
- Fuertes Overlook - the "Swan Pond" overlook was built by the Cayuga Bird Club in 1934 for ease of pond and bird sanctuary observation and was restored in 2017 by Friends of Stewart Park.
- Renwick Wildwood Arch - Designed by Louis Agassiz Fuertes and constructed by the Cayuga Bird Club in 1917, this arch was made to mark the original approach to the Renwick Wildwood.

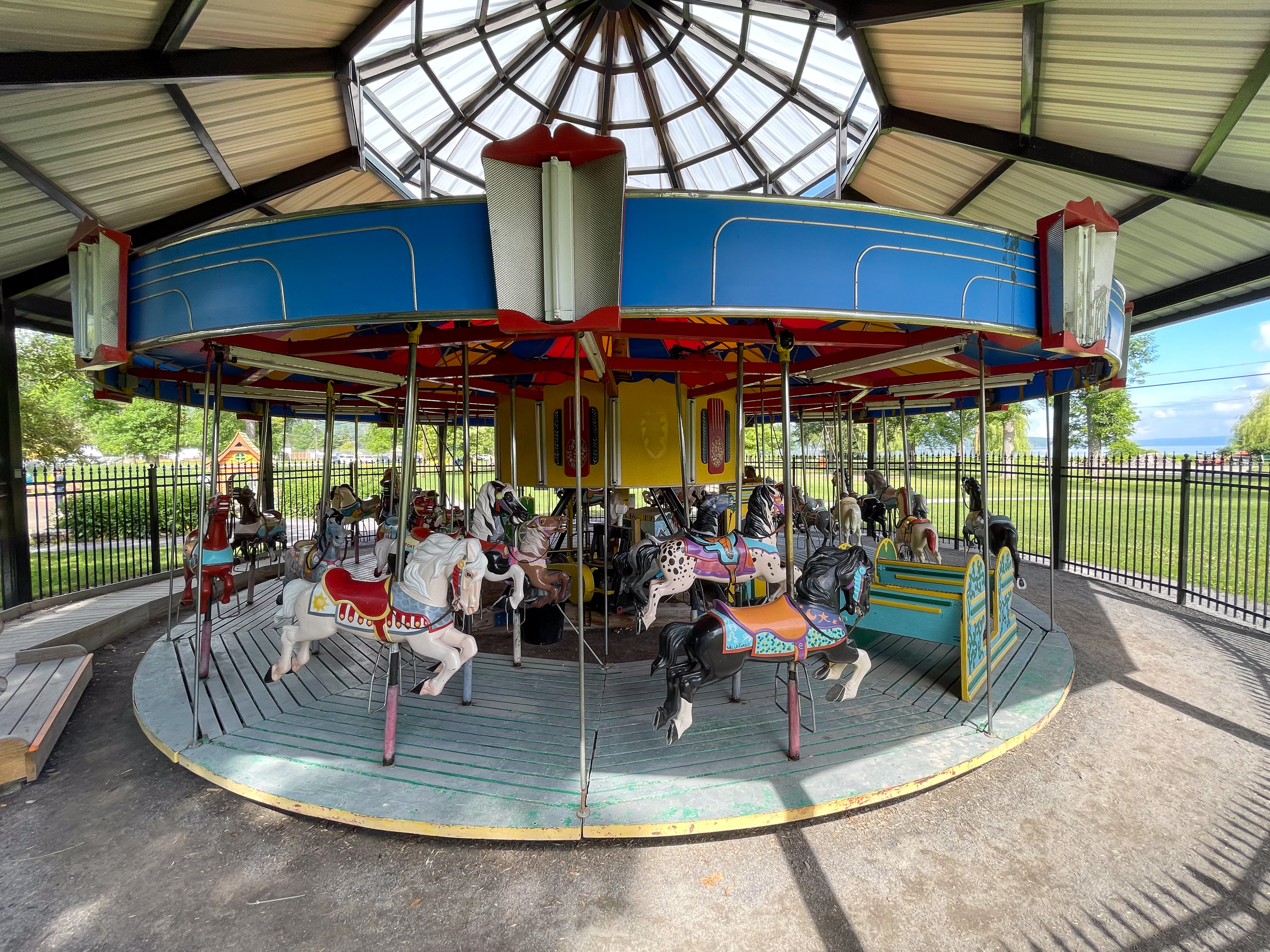
Carousel

- Carousel - Designed by the Allan Herschell Company and opened in 1952, the Stewart Park Carousel has been in continuous seasonal operation since. The carousel horses were repainted in 1986 by Trumansburg artist Annie Campbell and again in 2014-2015 by Ithaca artists Christi Sobel and Julia John. A new black metal fence was installed in 2016, and an accessible wheelchair ramp and chariot were added in 2018. In 2020, a permanent roof was installed so the carousel will no longer need to be taken down each fall, reducing wear and tear on the ride.

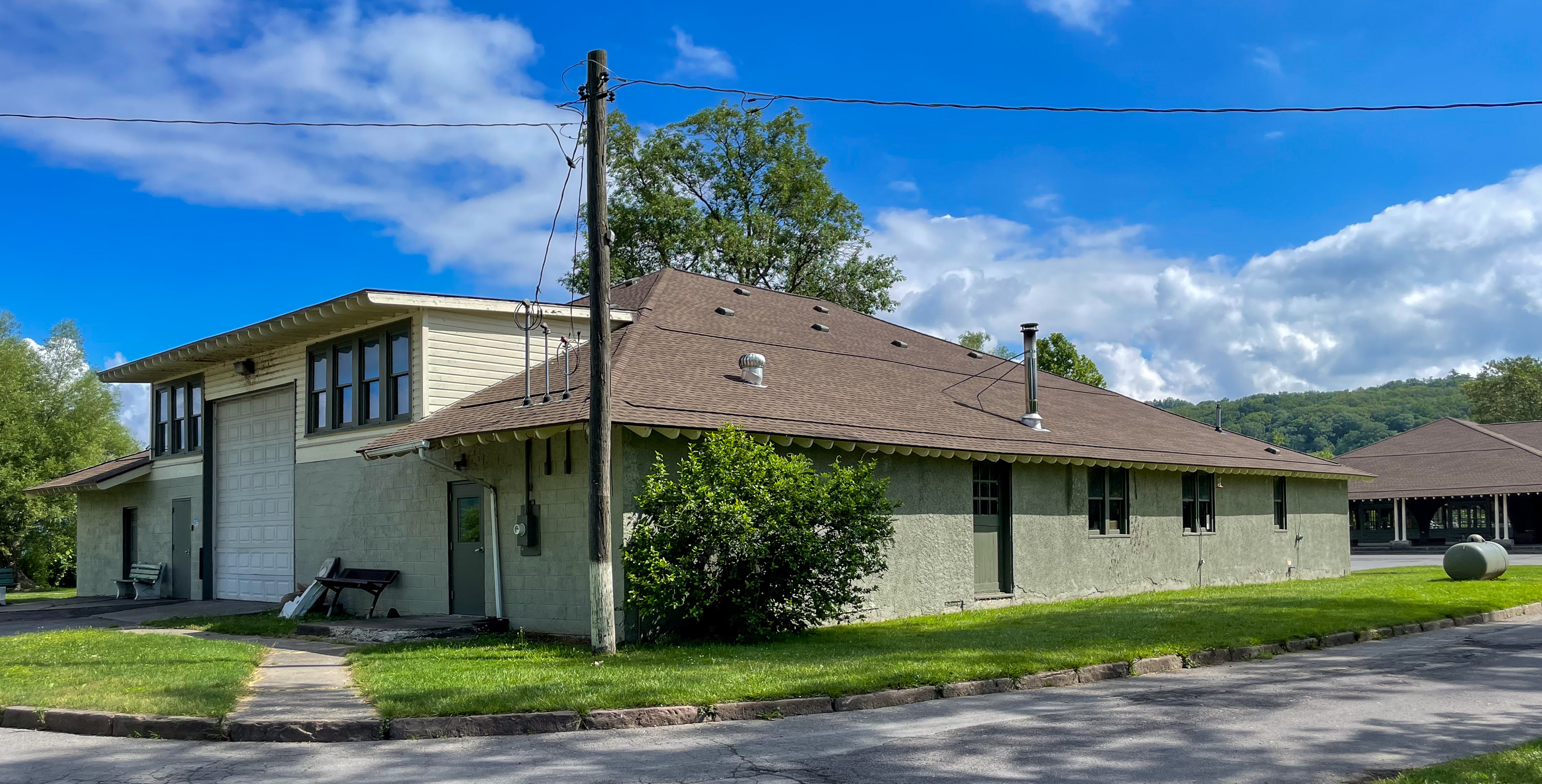
Dance Pavilion / Wharton Building

- Wharton Building - Designed by Clinton L. Vivian and Arthur Gibb in 1895, this structure was originally called the Dance Pavilion. Along with hosting dances, the building was also used as a vaudeville stage and a movie theater. When the Wharton Brothers leased the park for their film Studio, this building was used to film movies and serials. Tracks to hang lights and sets can still be found in the building. Today, the building is used primarily as the home of the Ithaca Department of Works but plans to renovate the lake-facing side of the structure into the Wharton Studio Museum and Park Center are underway.
- Water Tower - Though no longer in Stewart Park, the water tower was part of the original pavilion complex designed by Clinton L. Vivian and Arthur Gibb in 1895. Standing high above the other buildings, for trolley riders, it would have been their first glimpse of the park as they rode in. The structure was destroyed by Hurricane Hazel in 1954.
- Bandstand - No longer in the park, the bandstand was an octagonal raised gazebo structure near the pavilions that hosted nationally known bands like Patrick (Patsy) Conway and his "Famous Ithaca Band."

== Revitalization ==
In 2011, the Friends of Stewart Park began wide-ranging rehabilitation and restoration for Stewart Park. This effort began with the renovation of the Mayor Stewart Memorial Flagpole garden and clean up of the Picnic Pavilion and Wharton Building Since that time, Friends of Stewart Park in partnership with the City of Ithaca, have led a major revitalization effort including reconstruction of the small Tea Pavilion, restoration of the Picnic Pavilion, carousel, Fuertes swan pond overlook, roof replacements on the Wharton Building and Cascadilla Boathouse, and many smaller improvements throughout the park. Aside from restoring the past, Friends of Stewart Park is enhancing the park for the future. In 2020 the organization completed a new accessible playground. In 2021, a year-round restroom was completed. Further planned improvements include a new splash pad, added restrooms, and the creation of the Wharton Studio Museum and Park Visitor Center with a cafe.
