= Tuberculosis Preventorium for Children =

Preventorium in New Jersey, US

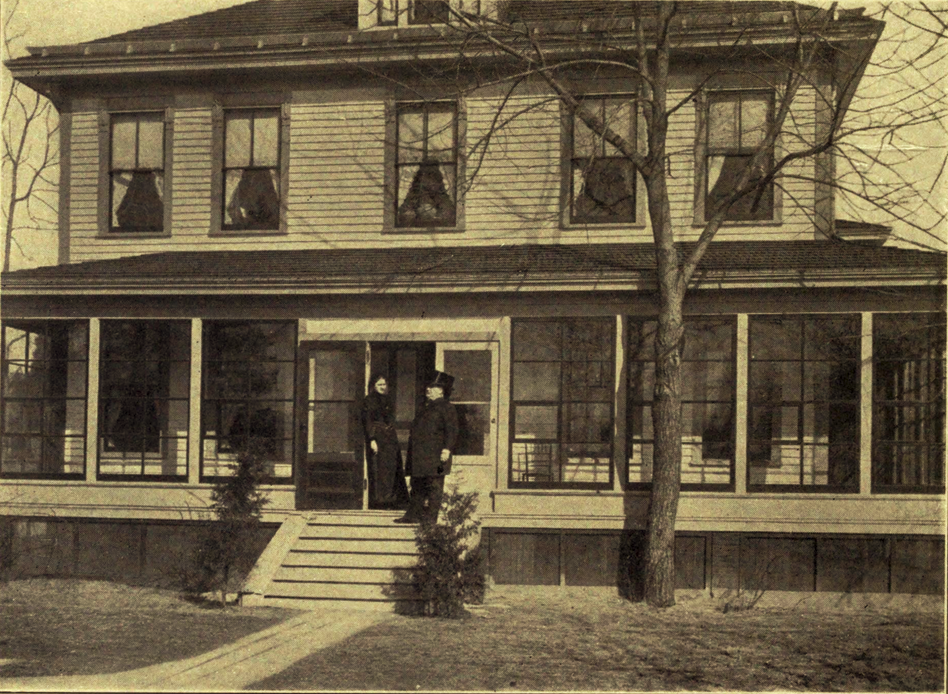
- Grover Cleveland Cottage, Tuberculosis Preventorium for Children, Lakewood
- Named after: The Tuberculosis Preventorium for Children was located at the Grover Cleveland Cottage, in Lakewood, New Jersey, which was named after President Grover Cleveland.
- Established: July 1909
- Founder: Nathan Straus
- Founded at: Lakewood Township, New Jersey, U.S.
- Dissolved: 1970
- Locations: Lakewood Township, New Jersey; Farmingdale, New Jersey
- Region served: New York City
- Services: preventorium
- President: Hermann Biggs
- Key people: Marcus M. Marks; Frances Cleveland

Tuberculosis Preventorium for Children in Lakewood Township, New Jersey was the first preventorium in the United States. It opened in July 1909, as an expression of Nathan Straus' desire to prevent the spread of tuberculosis among children. The children were selected mainly by the Association of Tuberculosis Clinics and were passed upon by the Department of Health of New York City. There were 32 of these clinics, to the nearest of which the parents applied. No discrimination was made as to race or creed, and there was no charge for transportation or board.

In 1910, the institution was removed to Farmingdale, New Jersey. What marked the buildings here were the dormitories, which were made without sash or glass, so that the children at night were sleeping practically in the open air, even in the winter. In 1914, there were at one time 200 children in the preventorium; these children represented 120 families. The executive committee of the preventorium, at first with some hesitation, determined to help the general tuberculosis campaign by giving employment by preference to tuberculous patients with the arrested disease—those who had been discharged from the various sanatoriums. In 1917, there were at Farmingdale 15 people in this class. Occasionally, one of these cases relapsed. The plan on the whole was successful, and the preventorium felt encouraged in what was called its auxiliary work.

One could become a member of the preventorium by payment of US$1 to US$1,000 per annum. The municipality of New York City contributed liberally.

This preventorium was a precursor of other similar institutions founded throughout the U.S. in connection with the larger municipalities. A number of them were subsequently established. The Tuberculosis Preventorium for Children closed in 1970, its services no longer being needed.

== Background ==
In the spring of 1909, it was decided to organize an institution for poorly nourished children exposed to tuberculous infection in their homes. At that time no such institution existed in the U.S.

Tests, by means of tuberculin reactions, which had been simplified and extensively used just previous to this time, had shown that in the U.S., as well as abroad, a large number of children of school age gave a positive tuberculin reaction. Furthermore, it became generally known that in large cities, such as New York, there were thousands of children far below average in physical development and slightly infected with tuberculosis, who were living under miserable hygienic conditions with members of the family suffering from communicable tuberculosis. There was no place to send these children to; in the summer, some could be sheltered for a few weeks in fresh-air homes; in the winter, a very few could be sent out of the city by unusual effort; but there was no institution in New York or the U.S. which had as its chief aim the care of this large group of afflicted children. Such was the basic social condition that led to the foundation of this preventorium.

The preventorium movement was not only part of the general tuberculosis campaign, a link in a long chain, of which other links are the various sanatoria for the tuberculous, the tuberculosis dispensaries, the boats, and the camps, but it was also a link in general child welfare work. Straus realized that there were thousands of children living in the tenements surrounded by tuberculous adults. Dr. Hermann Biggs, later the president of the Preventorium, estimated that New York City had 40,000 of these young children. It seemed that if any group of poorly nourished children was to get sick, it was these children who were not only predisposed to tuberculosis but also exposed to this disease.

In March 1909, Straus offered his interest in the Lakewood Hotel property for the care of poorly nourished children who were exposed to tuberculosis in their homes. He felt convinced that if these children became more physically fit by a visit to the countryside, with good food, fresh air, and a proper amount of rest and exercise, they would develop a definite resistance to this disease.

In order to start this work, Straus asked Marcus M. Marks to undertake the organization of such an institution for the prevention instead of the cure of disease, a preventorium rather than a sanatorium. Marks accepted the challenge and organized a board of directors composed of leading physicians, as well as active civic-minded women and men, and they all set to work to develop such an institution, to be viewed not only as a tuberculosis activity but also as a part of the child welfare work.

== Establishment in Lakewood, New Jersey (1909) ==
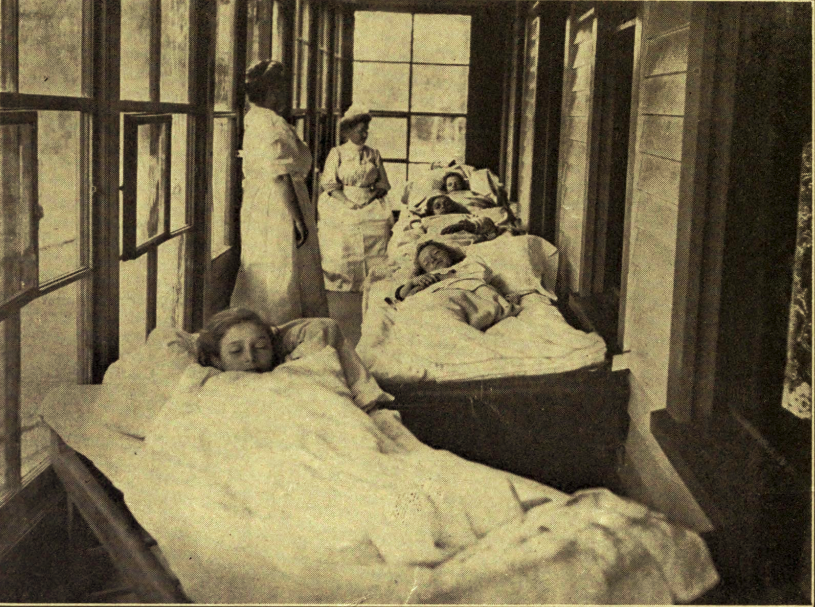
Girls' dormitory

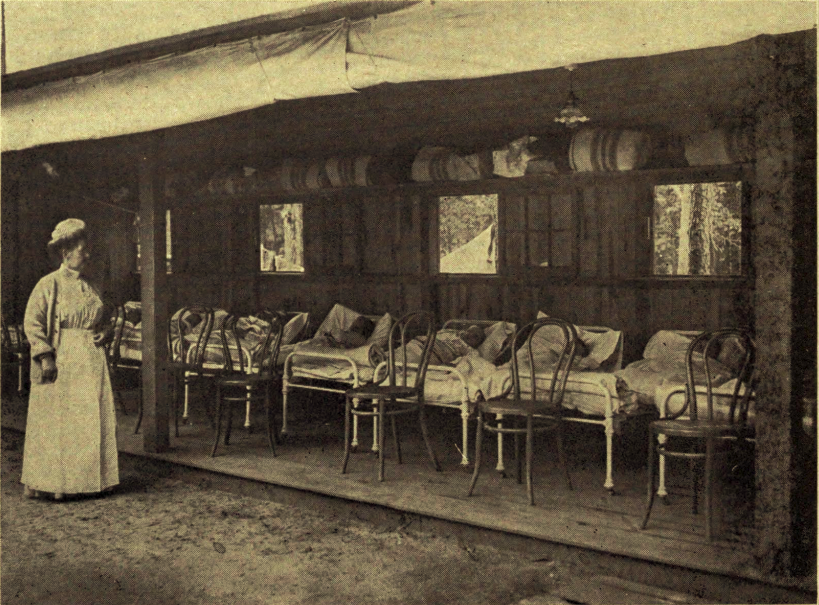
Open-air shack for boys

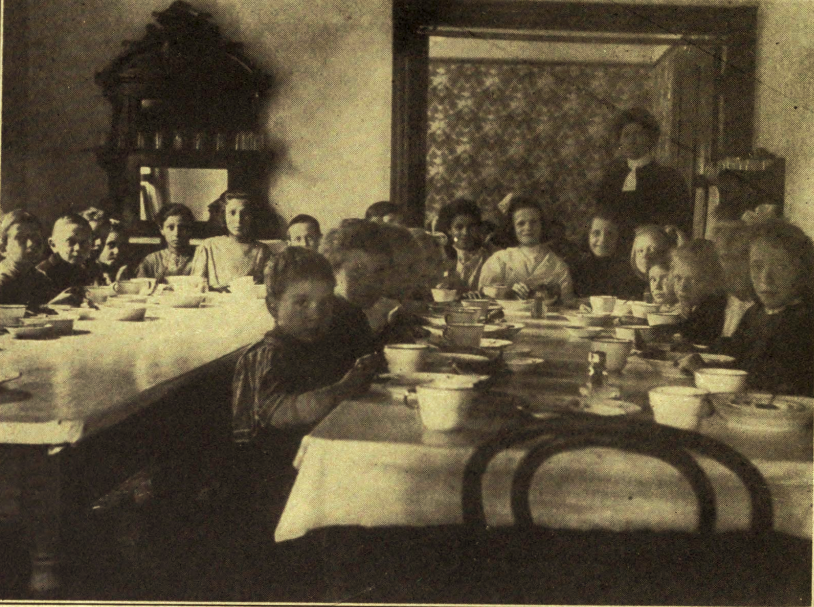
Dining room

The Preventorium had its beginning in May 1909, when possession was taken of the Grover Cleveland Cottage, in the Lakewood Hotel grounds. It was named after President Grover Cleveland who had passed some of the last weeks of his life here.

The cottage was adapted, under the personal direction of Frances Cleveland, widow of the President, the porch being arranged for six beds and the house for fourteen, these quarters being for girls. An open-air camp, about 100 feet (30 m) long was built to accommodate twenty boys.

The Preventorium began on a very small scale when it opened its doors in July 1909, to children at the Cleveland Cottage. There was at once a great demand for admission and a long waiting list of children anxious to be taken from their crowded homes to the healthy, free surroundings of the country, and the directors were soon nonplussed anew with the need for a large institution.

On November 9, after 92 children had been cared for, and all had shown steady improvement, Marks made the announcement that the institution was in successful operation. He said:—

"The Tuberculosis Preventorium for Children is the first institution of its kind in this country. The work has been inspired and made possible by the farsighted liberality of Mr. Nathan Straus, whose active efforts to reduce infant mortality have already made him known the world over. Mr. Straus has presented to us the Cleveland cottage and surrounding eight acres of pine woods at Lakewood, N. J., and a majority of stock in the Lakewood hotel property, in which his investment amounts to $500,000. There is no encumbrance or condition to this gift. We may either arrange to use the hotel property or to sell it and use the proceeds in constructing around the Cleveland cottage such buildings as we may require. Occupation of mind and body will second the good effects of the fresh, fragrant air of Lakewood, which, with its dry, porous soil, offers an ideal location for a Tuberculosis Preventorium. Practical instruction will be given in carpentering, cobbling, basketry, weaving, stencil work, metal work etc. Miss Dorothy Whitney has munificently endowed this department by a gift of $100,000, the interest of which will pay for instructors, tools and materials. We have had substantial voluntary cash donations toward our running expenses from Mr. Henry Phipps, Mr. Isaac N. Seligman, Mr. Jacob Wertheim, Mrs. Walter B. James and Mr. Jacob H. Schiff in advance of our first appeal for funds."

=== Opposition in Lakewood ===
In the winter of 1909–10, organized and determined opposition among the residents and property holders of Lakewood developed to the presence of the Preventorium, even though it was known that the institution did not admit any children who were tuberculous and who could in any way be a source of danger to their neighbors. The opposition was probably more because the encroachment of an institution in a residential section might lower property values rather than any fear of infection.

The efforts to thwart the Preventorium's existence began within a fortnight with the arrest of the Preventorium's superintendent on a charge of "bringing dependent children into the State of New Jersey". The next week, one of the trustees was arrested on the same charge. All possible means were resorted to in the effort to abolish the institution. Throughout the long and bitter fight, Straus gave unflagging support to the trustees but kept silent except on one occasion. He felt that the opposition was so ill-founded and so inhuman that it would soon defeat itself, but it was represented to him by a newspaperman that, as the originator of the plan to save children of tuberculous families from the harm that threatened them, the public desired from him some expression of his views upon the effort that was being made to throttle the Preventorium. He replied:

"It is incredible to me that any one should be so devoid of love and sympathy for his fellow creatures that he should say to the children who are threatened with the living death of tuberculosis, 'You must get off my part of the earth.' That seems to be the attitude of the small coterie of Lakewood cottagers who are seeking to deny to these children the God-given benefits of the outdoor life at Lakewood. But the majority of the citizens of Lakewood are not opposed to the Preventorium, nor is John D. Rockefeller, who has a large place there. "And among those who are raising such a hue and cry against the coming of poor children to the Preventorium are the very ones who profit, without protest, from the coming to Lakewood of wealthy tuberculous patients, who are in the infectious stages of the disease while these children in the Preventorium are not in an infectious condition, and no objection can be urged against them unless it be that they are not to be sources of revenue. The Preventorium plan proposes no harm to Lakewood. It is the most progressive plan yet devised for nipping tuberculosis in the bud. The method is to take young children who are not yet sources of infection, snatch them away from the poisoned air of their homes, and make them well and strong, as can be done nowhere so well as in Lakewood. Children who are already in advanced stages of the disease will not be received. The care that we are taking in the selection of children, for the protection of those who are in the Preventorium, is sufficient to guarantee that no children will be taken to Lakewood who could by any possibility be a menace to the health of the community. And it should be remembered that no such care has ever been taken by Lakewood to exclude wealthy consumptives from the resort."

== Relocation to Farmingdale, New Jersey (1910-1970) ==
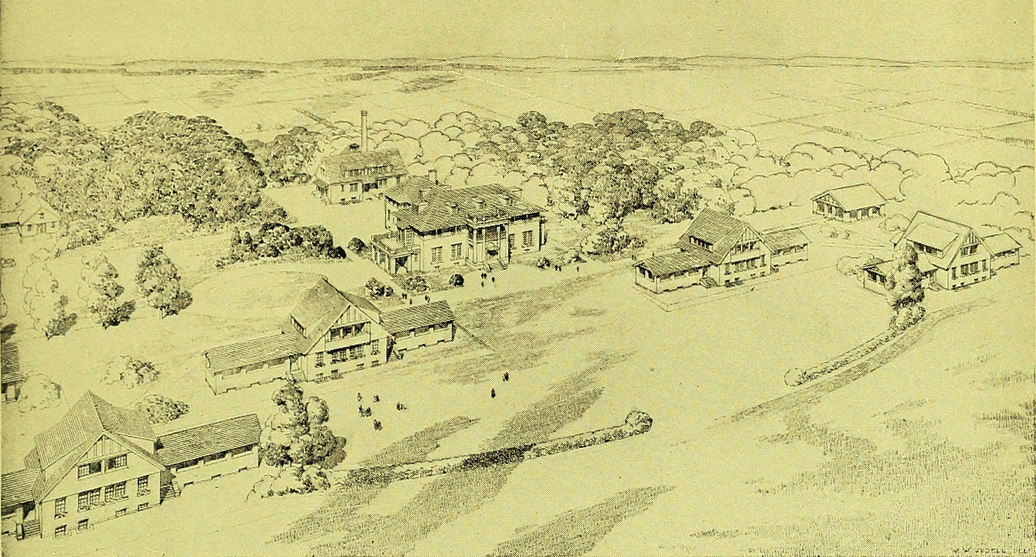
Farmingdale, New Jersey

At this point, Arthur Brisbane came to the rescue with a gift of a 170 acres (69 ha) farm at Farmingdale, New Jersey 7 miles (11 km) north of Lakewood, with a beautiful hilltop as a building site. Straus made it possible to construct a new and model institution by the generous gift of US$50,000 for a building fund. With this money, together with other contributions, the new Preventorium was built. The 1910 construction had a capacity for 128 children, and cost, including water supply and sewage disposal, US$110,000. The Board of Health Auxiliary subscribed US$4,500 to build an additional open shack, for which they would select the children.

A small farmhouse situated on this property was remodeled for temporary use, and the children transferred from Lakewood to Farmingdale on April 28, 1910.

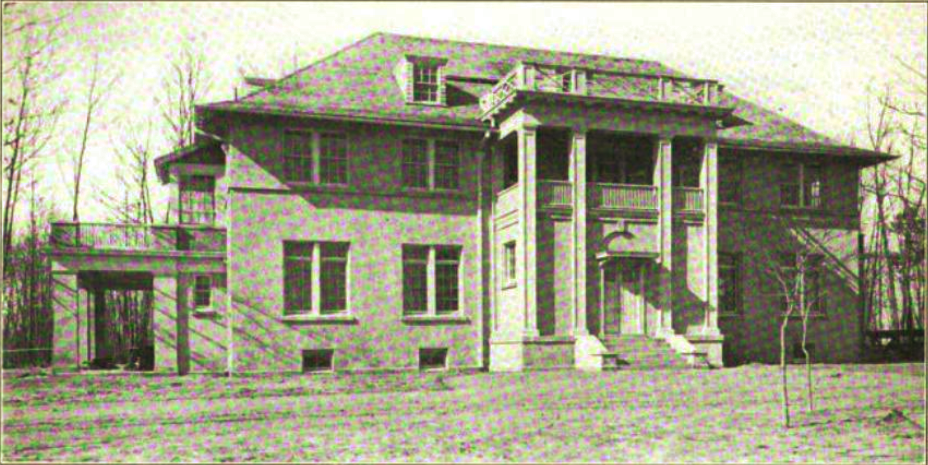
Administration building

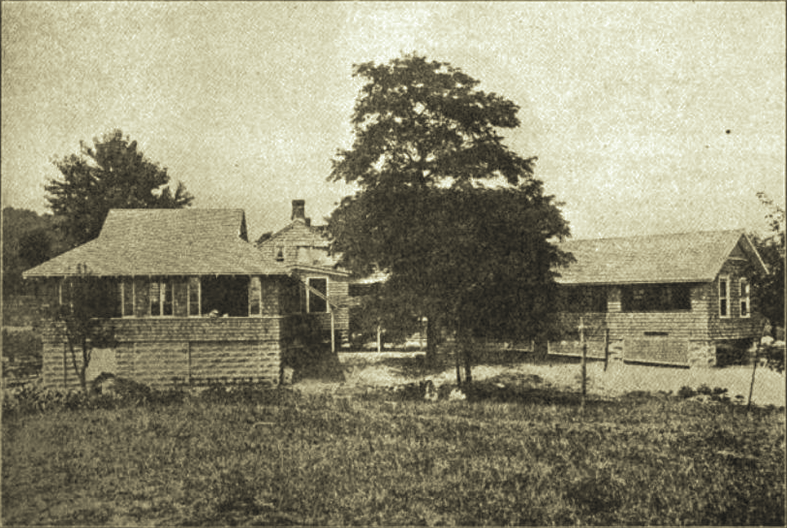
Reception pavilions

The Farmingdale plant consisted of open-air dormitories for children, an administration building, a power plant, two open-air schools, and several other smaller buildings. All children were quarantined during their first three weeks at the Preventorium in a reception pavilion in order to prevent infection of the large group.

The children were admitted to the Preventorium through the Tuberculosis Clinics in New York City, and remained at the Preventorium for a period of three to six months. They gained weight rapidly, with an average of ten pounds. Initially, only children between the ages of four and fourteen were admitted. Extension of the work to include younger children was very important, as infants were particularly susceptible to tuberculosis. If newborn babies were taken away from a tuberculous mother immediately, before they became infected, their lives would probably be saved.

The work of the Farmingdale Preventorium was intimately connected with that of the many tuberculosis clinics of New York. During the stay of the children at the preventorium, the conditions in their homes were investigated. This was one of the most difficult problems encountered in the work. Some homes could not be improved. Others could be bettered by sending the tuberculous member to a sanatorium, by giving instruction in cleanliness and hygiene and the proper disposal of sputum, and by considering needs with relief organizations and obtaining aid or additional assistance. Every six months after discharge, the children were to be revisited in the home and their physical condition and surroundings were noted.

=== Admission ===
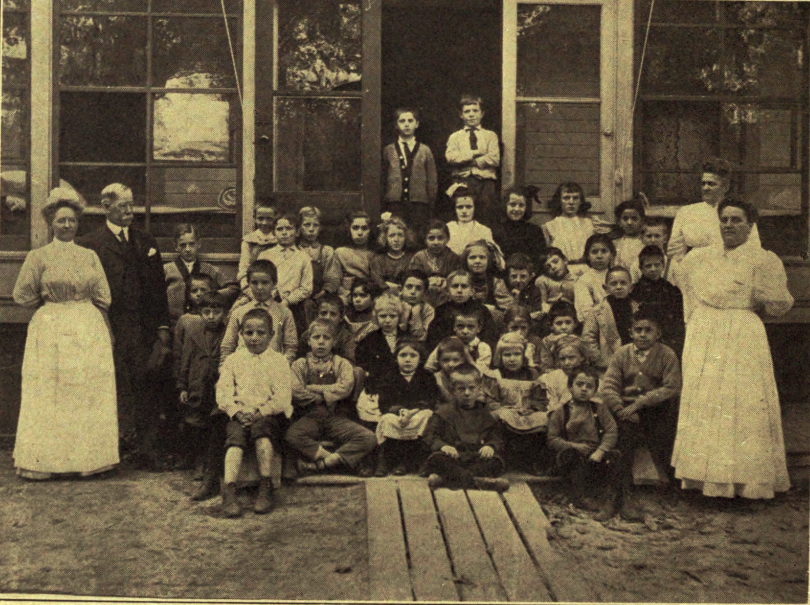
Lakewood

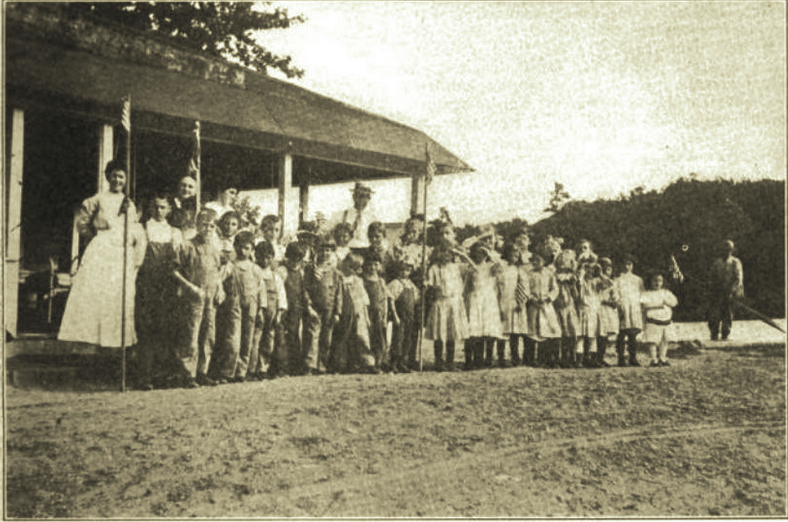
Farmingdale

Applicants must be examined by a physician, preferably at one of the tuberculosis clinics, who would fill out and sign the medical report blanks, which were obtained upon written or personal application to the Hospital Admission Bureau. Blanks were filled out in duplicate and sent to the Bureau. The applicants were then placed on a waiting list from which they were drawn for a final examination by the Medical Examiner for Admission to the Preventorium to determine their acceptance or rejection.

A tuberculin test was made in every case, and a report of the result was entered upon the application blank. No child was admitted who had tuberculosis in an infectious stage. No children who were known to have been exposed to any of the acute contagious diseases within three weeks of the date of their final examination for the Preventorium were eligible at that time. The presence in the house in which the children live, of any acute contagious disease at the time of the final examination, also temporarily disqualified them. Moreover, the presence of hypertrophied tonsils, adenoids, carious teeth, or pediculi or nits in the hair could be a cause of non-acceptance until such conditions are corrected. In order to save time and labor for all parties concerned, it is, therefore, requested that nurses have these conditions remedied before bringing the children for examination.

Clinic nurses were notified of the date of the final examination which was held at the Hospital Admission Bureau. Children who were accepted went to the Preventorium within two or three weeks of the date of their acceptance. Nurses were notified five days in advance whenever possible, of the date of departure for the Preventorium. At the appointed hour they had to have their charges at the Hospital Admission Bureau. From here, the children were taken across the ferry by the nurse from the Hospital Admission Bureau to meet the Preventorium nurse. Children who did not appear for the final examination when directed were placed in the rejected list unless the reason for such non-appearance was promptly furnished.

Every child on the date of departure was supplied with a complete outfit of the following articles: one extra dress or suit of clothes, one petticoat for girls, one extra pair of strong shoes, one pair of overshoes, three extra pairs of stockings, two extra suits of underwear, night drawers, one brush and comb, and one toothbrush. In winter (September 15 - March 15) they required in addition: one warm coat or sweater, one pair of woolen mittens, one cap covering ears, and one pair of rubber boots. Failure to provide these would prevent the child's acceptance. All clothing had to be in good condition and packed neatly in a bundle at admission.

=== Treatment plan ===
The plan of treatment was simple. It consisted of plenty of good food, a 24-hour day in the open air, an intimate acquaintanceship with the fields and the woods, and a practical lesson in cleanliness and hygiene.

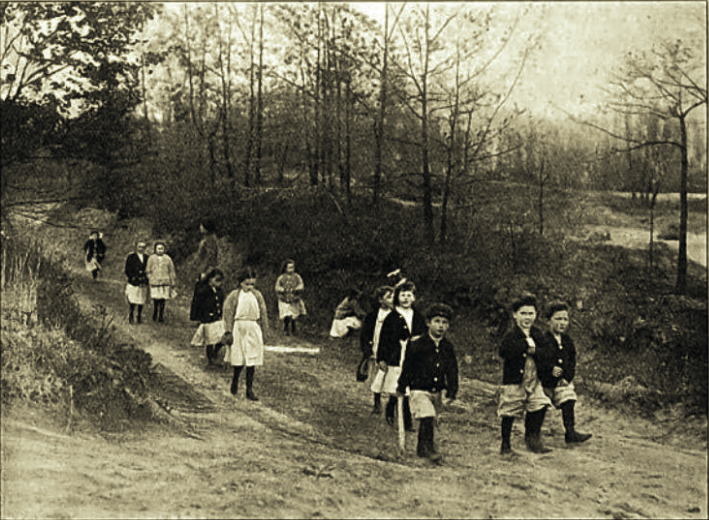
Children always in the open

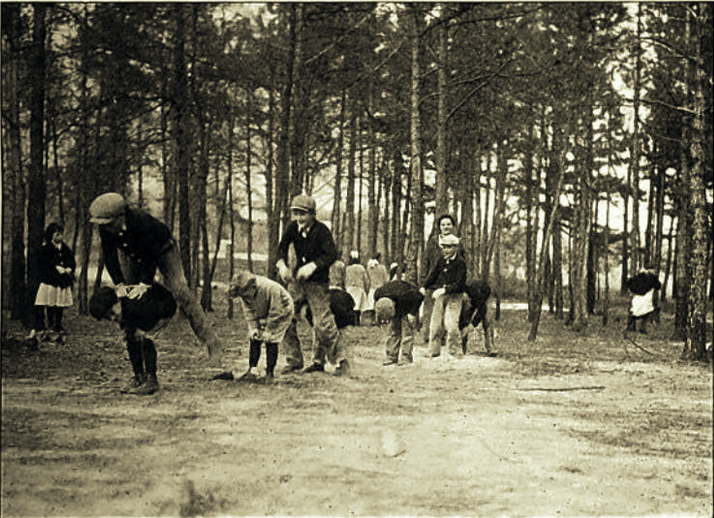
Exercise and recreation

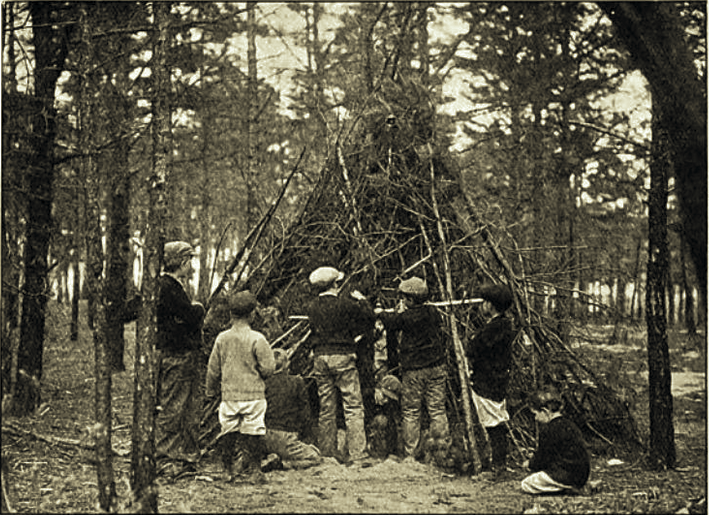
Children playing

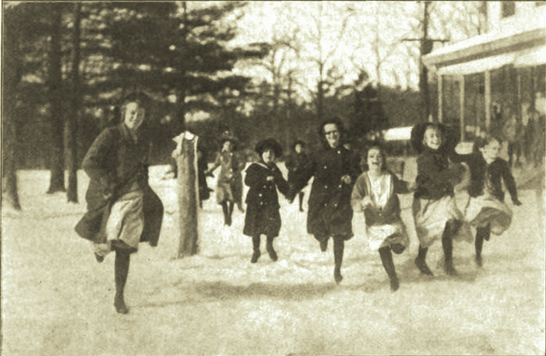
Children running

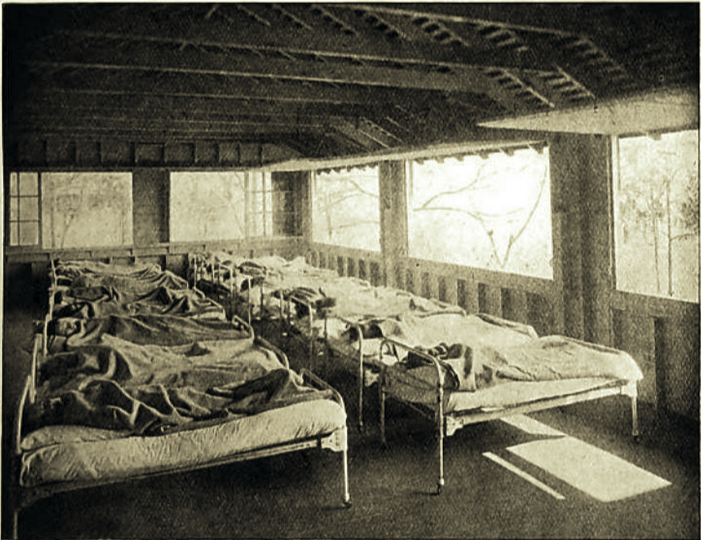
Rest hour

=== Education ===
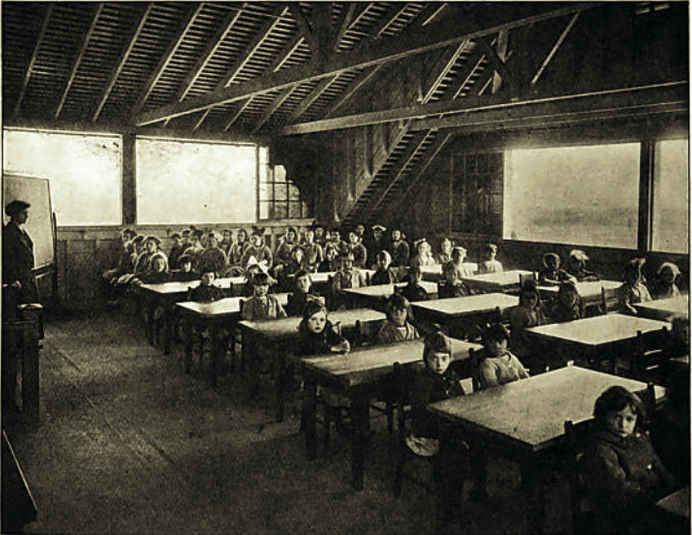
School room

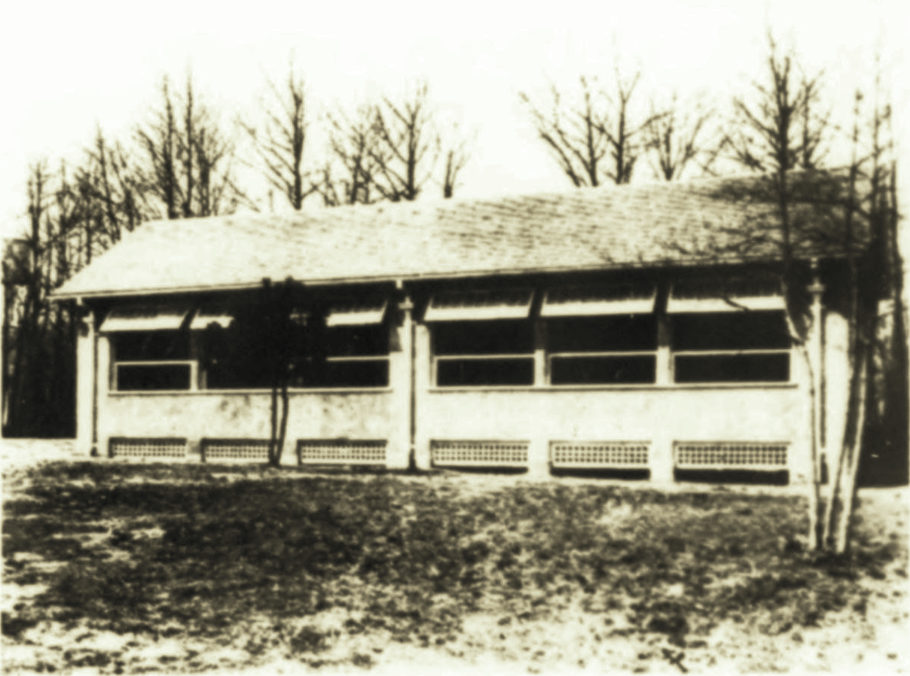
Open-air school

The grounds included two open-air schools. Three licensed teachers and a two-hour school period were provided. This amount of instruction -ten hours a week- was found sufficient to keep the children up to public school grade. If it were deemed wise to increase the period of instruction, many of these children could be advanced one class level. This mental invigoration of the children was attributed partly to the improvement of their physical condition, and in part to the stimulating effect of the open-air school. In this connection, the preventorium's records showed that the children were one grade in scholarship below the nominal standing for their age. Many of them were even more backward, thus exemplifying how physical and mental vigor went hand in hand. General instruction was conducted along the lines of that in the public school. In the summer, the boys did gardening, and almost all the children did chores in the shacks or in the dining room.

The Preventorium also had an industrial educational department. Instruction was afforded in carpentry, carving, basketry, weaving, stencil work, leather work, sewing, cooking, cobbling, and tailoring.

The difficulties in the way of educating the children properly were great, owing to the constant coming and going, and owing also to the usually anemic condition of the children on their reception. It was managed, however, to keep each child up to its proper grade in school, so that it lost no time on its return to the city and was submitted to no undue strain.

=== Infantorium ===
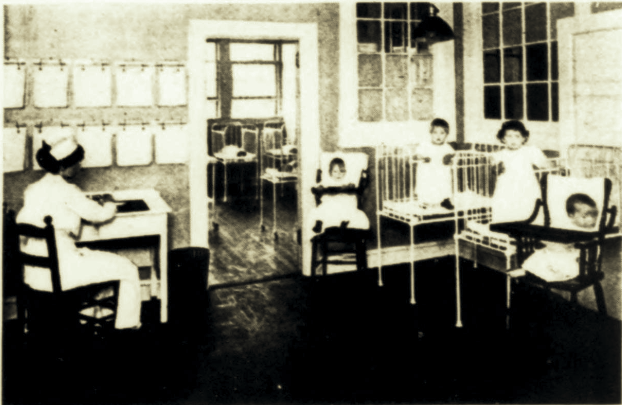
Infantorium

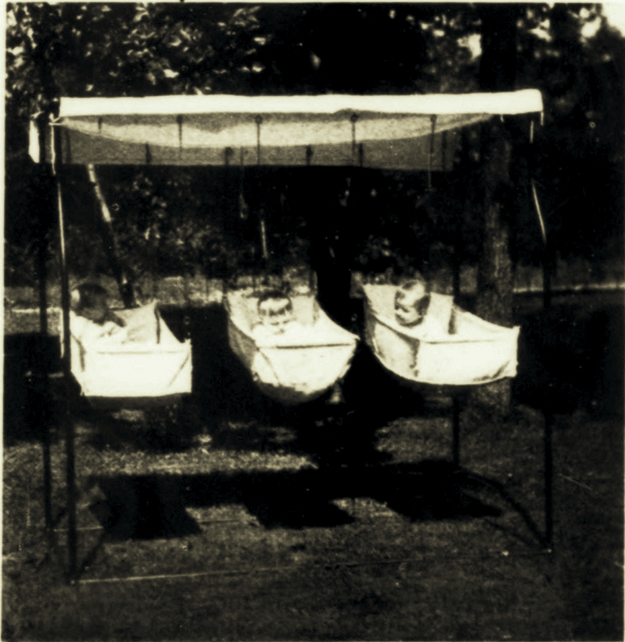
Improved infantorium beds

In the homes of over one-third of the children at the preventorium there were infants for whose case no institution in the city could be found. To test out the practicability of an "infantorium", an adjunct to the Farmingdale Preventorium with twelve cribs was opened and a report of the findings was made in January 1918. It was feared that mothers would be persuaded only with difficulty, if at all, to part with their babies for an extended period of time. However, it required very little persuasion to convince a tuberculous mother that she was putting her infant in harm's way, and to assure her of the advantages of separation from the baby as well as for herself. During a period of two years, 36 infants were admitted, varying in age from one month to one year. The mothers were the most active foci of infection. At first tuberculous infants were admitted, but the prognosis in these proved to be so poor that thereafter only infants with a negative tuberculin reaction were taken in, that is, a group not yet infected and therefore amenable to preventive measures. Of 28 such infants, two died of diphtheria, two of marasmus, and one of enteritis. The ultimate disposition of these infants proved to be less of a problem than was anticipated and in only two instances was there any difficulty, one baby being retained over time at the preventorium and another almost two years old being returned to its tuberculous mother. It was felt that this experience showed that it was quite possible to save the infants of tuberculous mothers, and a duty to provide for them.

=== Grounds ===
The site consisted of about 150 acres (61 ha) of land and was situated in a rolling country. The buildings were placed on a knoll 70 feet (21 m) above the surrounding land, which had a gentle slope to the south, and a growth of timber on the north, giving good protection from the winter winds. The entrance was about 400 feet (120 m) to the west of the country road and all the buildings were grouped about 60 feet (18 m) apart. The dormitories containing the infirmaries were placed nearest to the administration building. There was a good-sized creek within 1,000 feet (300 m) of the buildings and a small river .5 miles (0.80 km) from the site. The Central Railroad of New Jersey crossed a corner of the property and the railroad company put in a siding .25 miles (0.40 km) from the power house without cost to the institution.

The water was supplied from an artesian well 450 feet (140 m) deep, which was driven at a point about 700 feet (210 m) from the buildings, on lower land, and is covered by a small pump house in which is installed an electric pump driven by power generated in the central powerhouse.

=== Architecture and fittings ===
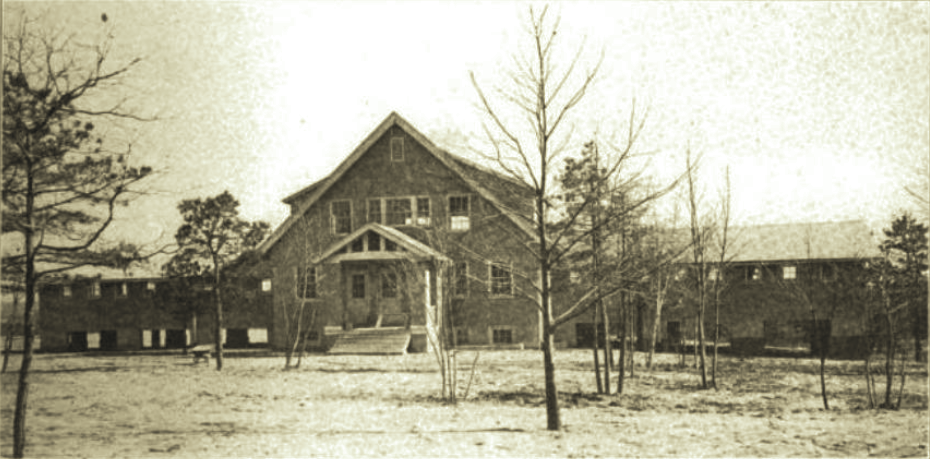
Dormitory

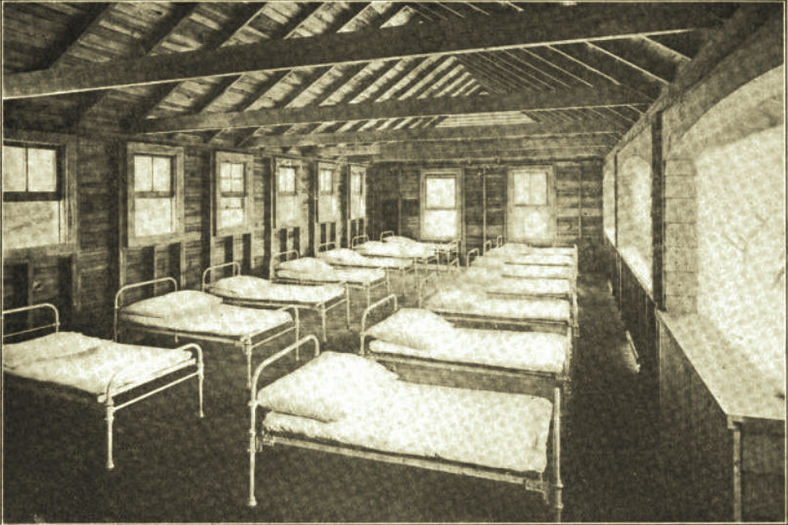
Girls' open-air dormitory

The design of Dormitory Building No. 1 was modified from the design of the shack for children at Municipal Sanatorium at Otisville. The exterior walls of these pavilions were constructed of hollow tile, covered with cement stucco, and were placed on a concrete foundation and concrete piers. The interiors were of frame construction, with floors of edge-grain yellow pine, and the roofs were covered with shingles. There were four of these buildings, all alike, except the second floors of the central sections. The basements contained bathing facilities, and the wings were arranged as sleeping wards, with open fronts, ceilings 8 feet (2.4 m) high, and windows in the rear walls. The dressing rooms in the centre sections were furnished around the walls with benches divided into individual lockers, used to store the toys and personal belongings of the children. Over these benches, at a height of 5.5 feet (1.7 m), were two shelves where the blankets used during the rest hour were placed. On the rear walls were racks to hold toilet articles and in the centre was a stone wash-trough with hot and cold water faucets. Behind the dressing rooms were store rooms fitted with large pigeon-holes used instead of lockers, and the toilets arranged to be entered from the rear directly from the grounds and playrooms without tracking mud through the dressing rooms or wards. In two pavilions, the second story consisted of one large play and school room, which could be entirely opened on three sides, and accommodated 56 children. In the other buildings, the second stories were used as infirmaries, divided into two wards for four children each, with a porch on the south to which the beds could be wheeled, a nurses' room, a bath, a diet kitchen, and a linen room. The pavilions had a capacity for twenty-eight patients each, and cost US$7,700. A nursery was equipped for the care of 12 infants.

The Administration building was of frame construction, with a shingle roof, except the outside walls, which were of hollow tile, covered externally with cement stucco and placed on a concrete foundation. The floors were of yellow pine and all the corridors and rooms having much wear were covered with linoleum held in place by brass strips laid flush with the flooring material. The front of the Administration building was 103 by 36 feet (31 m × 11 m) and the rear extension 63 by 27 feet (19.2 m × 8.2 m). On the first floor in the main section is a business office 12 by 18 feet (3.7 m × 5.5 m), reception room 12 by 14 feet (3.7 m × 4.3 m), staff dining room 17 by 20 feet (5.2 m × 6.1 m) and a doctor's office 12 by 12 feet (3.7 m × 3.7 m). The main dining room occupied one-half of the front section and is 41 by 31 feet (12.5 m × 9.4 m). In the rear extension is a serving room 25 by 19 feet (7.6 m × 5.8 m), kitchen 25 by 19 feet (7.6 m × 5.8 m), servants' dining room 13 by 18 feet (4.0 m × 5.5 m), and cold storage. The second floor is divided in both sections by corridors. On the front is an apartment consisting of two rooms and bath for the medical superintendent, bedrooms for the head nurse and matron, and a staff sitting room. On the rear are two rooms for teachers, a sewing and linen room, a clerk's room and twelve rooms and a bath for the servants. All the women servants are housed in the administration building, and the men in the third floor of the power house. The two entrances for the children are arranged to give them direct access to the dining room without going through other parts of the building. This building for administrative purposes has a capacity for one hundred and twelve children, and was constructed in connection with a reception cottage one quarter mile distant which is a separate unit and has a capacity for thirty children. The cost of the administration building was US$25,000.

== Later years ==
In later years, the property on Old Tavern Road was used as a daycare center. In 1970, the Howell Township purchased it from the Windham Children's Service and Child Care Center of New York.
