= Association of Tuberculosis Clinics =

- Association of Tuberculosis Clinics of Greater New York
- Formation: 1907
- Founded at: New York City, New York, U.S.
- Services: Alliance of medical clinics
- Field: tuberculosis

The Association of Tuberculosis Clinics (also known as Association of Tuberculosis Clinics of Greater New York) was an early 20th-century organization of tuberculosis clinics based in New York City, New York. It was formed in 1907 with eight clinics in Manhattan and The Bronx, and was considered to be a forward movement of great importance in the tuberculosis campaign in New York City. Aside from the general object of combating tuberculosis and alleviating the condition of tuberculosis persons, the association aimed to prevent patients drifting from one clinic to another.

The Association was composed of physicians who were chiefs of the tuberculosis divisions of their respective clinics. Until the permanent alliance of medical and social experts was arranged, the work for the care of consumptives was done in such an unsystematized fashion that the physicians, visiting nurses and charity agents were forced to take up cases without reference to each other. The division of the labor of the hospitals and clinics geographically instead of by affiliations of race and color was considered a radical step, but it was proved successful. Early in the history of the Association, it insisted upon the importance of medical supervision of the families of patients. Special emphasis was laid upon the supervision of children in the families of tuberculous individuals, and the clinics were urged to hold special sessions for children.

== Background ==
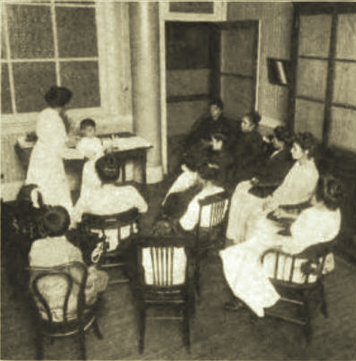
Teaching hygiene at clinic to mothers.

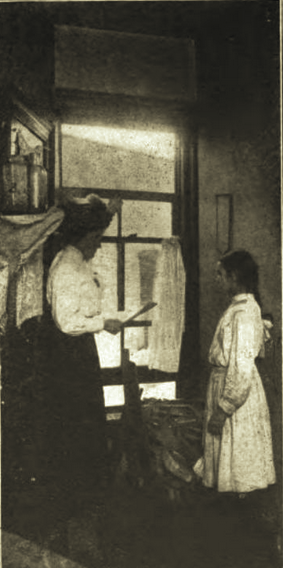
Teaching ventilation hygiene at home.

The Association was formed with several objectives: To organize dispensary control of tuberculosis in New York City and to develop a uniform system of operation of such dispensaries as are organized for this purpose; to retain patients under observation until they are satisfactorily disposed of, and to prevent their drifting from one dispensary to another; to facilitate the attendance of patients at the dispensary most convenient to their homes; to facilitate the work of visiting nurses in the homes of patients; to provide for each patient requiring it, assistance by special funds or through benevolent organizations and proper hospitals, sanatorium or dispensary care; to coöperate with, and assist as far as possible, the Department of Health in the supervision of tuberculosis; to do any and all acts and things which may lawfully be done to aid in securing any of the above-named objectives; and generally to combat and assist in combating tuberculosis and to alleviate and assist in alleviating its effects. The work of the Association was to be carried on largely by voluntary subscriptions.

== History ==
The Association of Tuberculosis Clinics was organized in 1907 as an offshoot of the Tuberculosis Relief Committee of the New York Charity Organization Society, for the purpose of eliminating the overlapping and duplication in the work of the various tuberculosis clinics. The Association then consisted of eight clinics as follows: Bellevue, Health Department, Gouverneur, Presbyterian, Vanderbilt, New York Dispensary, New York Hospital, and Harlem. Posters were distributed in 1908 giving the address of the clinic for the particular district in which the poster was distributed. Each clinic was responsible for a definite district of the city and all people living in that district were required to be treated at that particular clinic.

By May 1908, there were eleven active members, Drs. John Billings, R. A. Fraser, John H. Huddleston, Abraham Jacobi, James C. Greenway, Alfred Meyers, James Alexander Miller, Henry S. Patterson, Henry L. Shively, Arthur M. Shrady, and Bertram H. Waters, representing the eleven tuberculosis clinics in the city, and the associate members stood for various charitable organizations working among the poor of the city. By the forming of a permanent alliance of medical and social experts, a far great amount of efficiency was said to result from the same amount of effort. Until these arrangements were started, the work for the care of consumptives was done in such an unsystematized fashion that the physicians, visiting nurses and charity agents were forced to take up cases without reference to each other. The division of the labor of the hospitals and clinics geographically instead of by affiliations of race and color was considered a radical step, but it was proved successful.

The Association was incorporated on 1 February 1910. By that year, the Association's chain of clinics extended from the Bronx to Brooklyn.

The total number of patients in Greater New York reported as under the care of the clinics belonging to the Association during 1918 was 44,24, as against 46,266 in 1917, a loss of 4%. In all boroughs, 20,801 new cases were reported, a loss of 11.6% for the year. There was a gain of 0.2% in the number of old cases readmitted during the year. There was also a considerable decrease (9.6%) in the number of visits made to clinics by patients. Nurses made 25% fewer visits. This was due to unusual conditions created by World War I and in part to the 1918 influenza epidemic. Of the total number of cases handled during the year, 15,848 were discharged as "non-tuberculous".

By 1919, there were 30 clinics extending over the entire city. They had under their care 43,000 patients requiring a total of 128,000 dispensary visits. In addition, trained nurses made 57,000 calls to their homes, giving the personal attention necessary. About 16,000 children exposed to tuberculosis were kept under observation.

The membership grew rapidly, especially by an increase in the number of Health Department clinics. By 1920, there were 30 tuberculosis clinics in the Association, 20 operated by the Health Department, three by Bellevue Hospital and allied hospitals, and seven by private institutions as follows: Lenox Hill, Mount Sinai, New York Dispensary, New York Hospital, Presbyterian, St. Luke's, and Vanderbilt Clinic. Several other clinics were members of the Association from time to time and resigned for various reasons.

In 1929, the Association maintained 29 dispensaries, extending throughout New York city. Of these, 17 were maintained by the New York City Department of Health, either by private hospital or dispensary, and four by the Bellevue and Allied group of hospitals.

== Administration ==
The work of the organization was carried on by an executive staff under the supervision of the board of directors. The functions of this staff were to receive and tabulate information from the monthly reports of the individual clinics; to make critical studies from time to time of the efficiency of the various dispensaries and make reports of these studies; to prepare annual reports, circulars of information, "Clinic Notes" as described later; and to coöperate with the Board of Health and voluntary health organizations in their activities. Dr. James A. Miller (died 1948) was the first president of the Association.

== Children ==
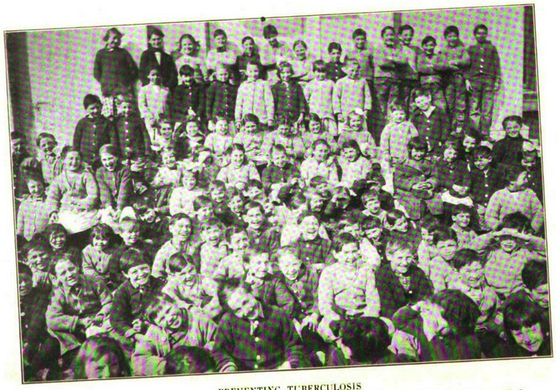
Some of the children from clinic families at the Tuberculosis Preventorium for Children (Farmingdale, New Jersey, 1912)

By 1909, there were two special clinics for children, treating 22% of the total number of children reported for that year. During the following year, Mt. Sinai attempted to establish a special children's clinic, but after several months was obliged to abandon the experiment because of the lack of sufficient physicians and nurses. At the beginning of 1912, upon request, the special staff nurse of the Association was assigned for the purpose of establishing a children's clinic in connection with Gouverneur Tuberculosis Clinic. Opening with 44 children, transferred from the adult clinic, of whom 28 were positive cases and 16 under observation for diagnosis, within five months, the clinic roster showed 237 children under treatment, 50 of whom had been diagnosed as positive cases. In October, the same nurse was assigned to the New York Hospital for a similar purpose. Formerly tuberculous children, as well as children of tuberculous families, were treated in the general pediatrics department of this institution. The Association also selected the children who were in danger of becoming infected with tuberculosis and placed them in the Tuberculosis Preventorium for Children in Farmingdale, New Jersey for three months.

== Main achievements ==
The Association established requirements for admission to its membership:

- Clinics eligible for membership in the Association must be provided with (a) a separate class for tuberculosis cases; (b) a graduate nurse assigned to this class for the purpose of maintaining supervision over the homes of these tuberculosis cases; (c) a district within which the work of the class is limited for new cases.
- By insisting on these minimum requirements the Association has been able in many instances to raise the standards of the clinics applying for admission.

The Association brought about a district organization of tuberculosis clinic work thus eliminating a great deal of confusion and conserving the time and energy of both patients and the clinic personnel.

Various critical studies of the work of the tuberculosis clinics were made from time to time and the observations of the work done at the clinics were incorporated in reports submitted to clinic authorities for their information and guidance. This constructive criticism resulted in higher standards of procedure being gradually introduced in all clinics.

A system of monthly reports from the individual clinics to the central office was instituted by the Association. These reports were of great value to the clinics themselves because they necessitated a monthly checking up of their own activities and also served as a basis for some of the critical studies of the association and of the annual reports.

On the basis of the monthly statements, the Association published an annual report giving an account of the work of every clinic in the Association. It also issued a monthly bulletin, Clinic Notes, and distributed it to the Association members for purposes of bringing clinics closer together, stimulating healthy rivalry, and establishing an esprit de corps among the workers.

A series of circulars of information were issued to the clinics to keep them in touch with matters of general interest and to inform them of all rulings concerning methods of procedure adopted by the Association or promoted by the Health Department.

The Association organized conferences of tuberculosis workers with the aim of discussing the problems encountered in the work and methods of meeting them. The nurses working in tuberculosis clinics were organized into a group with the object of establishing through contact a cooperative spirit and of promoting uniformity in the work.

The Association was an influential factor in shaping the development of the tuberculosis clinic work and set an example of what can be accomplished by similar coöperative efforts in other branches of dispensary work.
