= Marcus M. Marks =

American politician (1858–1934)

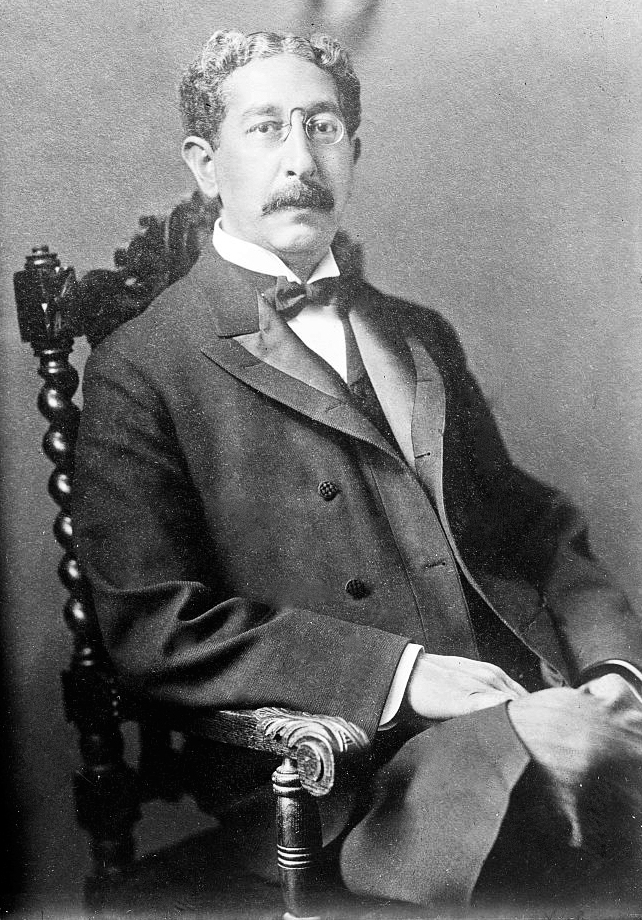
- Born: March 18, 1858; Schenectady, New York, US
- Died: March 26, 1934 (aged 76)
- Title: Manhattan Borough President
- Term: 1914–1917
- Predecessor: George McAneny
- Successor: Frank Dowling
- Spouse: Esther Friedman Marks

Marcus Mersaws Marks (March 18, 1858 – August 26, 1934) was an American businessman who was president of the Daylight Saving Association, president of the Clothiers' Association, and Manhattan Borough President from 1914 to 1917. He assisted in establishing the Tuberculosis Preventorium for Children.

== Biography ==
He was born on March 18, 1858, in Schenectady, New York. In 1877, he started his first business in Passaic, New Jersey, and later started work at the wholesale clothing firm of his father, David Marks & Sons. He was president of the Clothiers' Association of New York, and president of the National Association of Clothiers, president of the Clothing Trade Association of New York, and chairman of the Hospital Saturday and Sunday Association Trade Auxiliary. He later served also as trustee of the Hospital Saturday and Sunday Association, director of the Educational Alliance, member of the Conciliation Committee of the National Civic Federation, director of the National Butchers' and Drovers' Bank.

== Personal life ==
Marks married the suffragist, Esther Friedman, on May 21, 1890. She died on April 22, 1937. He died on August 26, 1934.

Marks was the brother of Louis B. Marks (1869–1939), a leading illumination (lighting) engineer. Louis’ son was songwriter Johnny Marks (1909–1985), who wrote “Rudolph the Red-Nosed Reindeer”.

Marcus and Esther Marks had two daughters: Bernice Marks married (and divorced) Robert B. Stearns, co-founder of Bear Stearns. Doris Marks married industrial designer Henry Dreyfuss.
