= Hermann Biggs =

American physician

Hermann M. Biggs
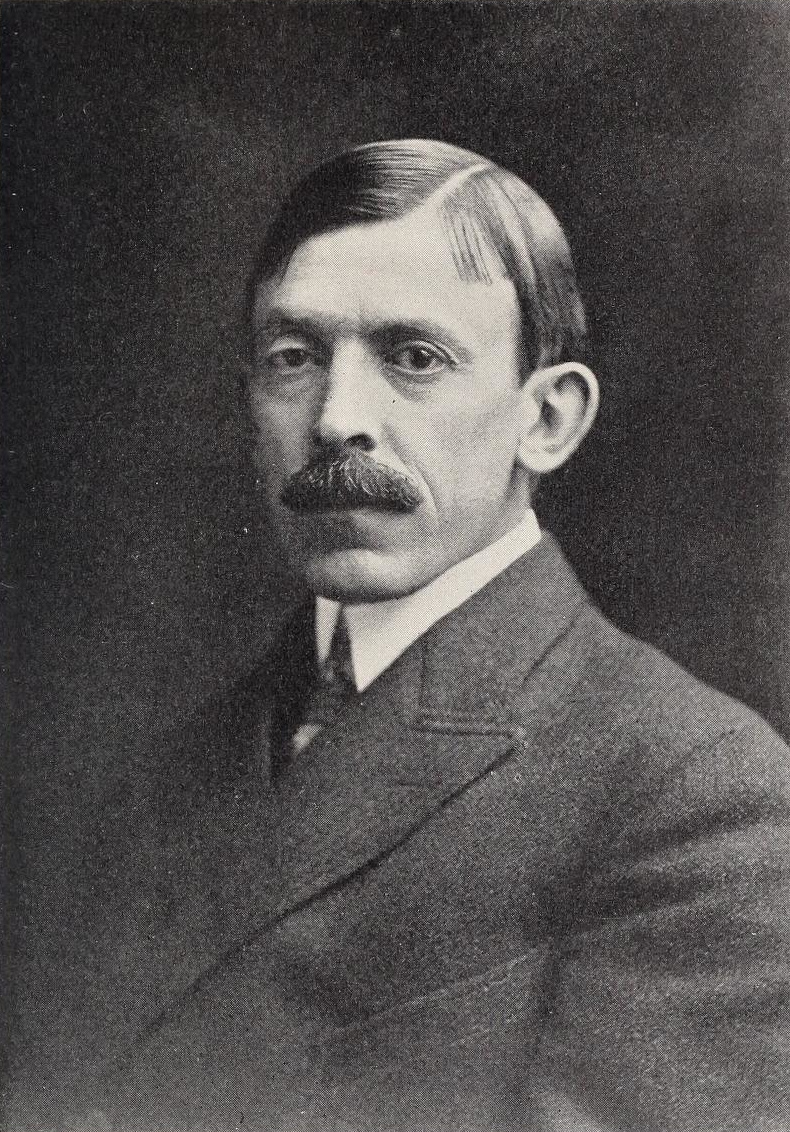
- Born: September 29, 1859; Trumansburg, New York
- Died: June 28, 1923 (aged 63); New York, New York
- Education: New York University School of Medicine
- Scientific career
- Fields: medicine public health bacteriology
- Workplaces: Metropolitan Board of Health

Hermann Michael Biggs (September 29, 1859 – June 28, 1923) was an American physician and pioneer in the field of public health who helped apply the science of bacteriology to the prevention and control of infectious diseases. He was born in Trumansburg, New York.

== Biography ==
Educated at Cornell University and Bellevue Hospital Medical College, Hermann Biggs became lecturer and professor of pathological anatomy in the latter institution in 1885. From 1892 to 1901, he was pathologist and director of the bacteriological laboratories and thereafter was general medical officer of the New York Department of Health. In 1897, he was appointed professor of therapeutics and clinical medicine, and in 1907 associate professor of medicine in the University and Bellevue Hospital Medical College. In addition to his other duties he assumed the directorship of the Rockefeller Institute for Medical Research, upon its organization in 1901.

Impressed by what Lillian Wald's public health nurses were able to achieve in reducing school absenteeism due to communicable diseases that could be treated at home, Biggs, who was responsible for New York City's health employed nine nurses in Manhattan – the first school nurses to be employed in any city in the United States. This led to his adding public health nursing to the municipal machinery for the control of tuberculosis. He served as president of the Tuberculosis Preventorium for Children in Farmingdale, New Jersey.

In 1913, he was chief of a board of experts appointed to make an investigation of health conditions in New York State, and in 1914, he became State Commissioner of Health for New York. He was appointed medical director of the General League of Red Cross Societies at Geneva in 1920 and was knighted by the King of Spain for services in preventive medicine. His publications include The Administrative Control of Tuberculosis (1904) and An Ideal Health Department, with C. E. A. Winslow (1913).

In the early years of broadcasting, Biggs was among the first medical experts to have a radio program. He broadcast over station WGY in Schenectady NY on Friday nights during much of 1922, discussing common diseases and illnesses.

Hermann Biggs died in New York on June 28, 1923. He was buried in Grove Cemetery in Trumansburg.

== Recognition ==
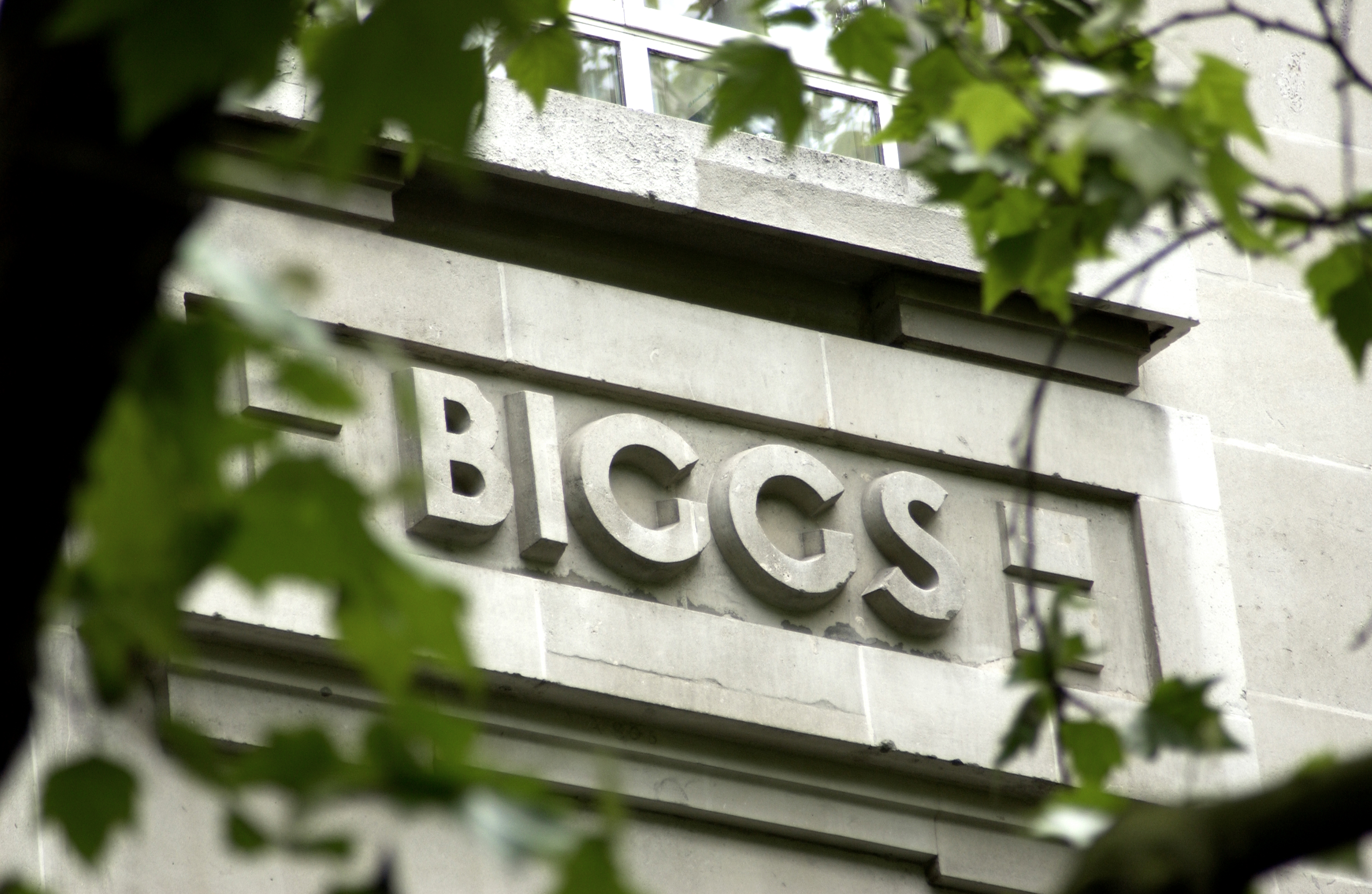
Hermann Biggs name as it appears on the LSHTM Frieze

After hearing that Biggs had died, governor Al Smith publicly stated, "His death is a distinct loss to the state in a most important branch of its service. In the expression of my regret, I feel that I am joined by the citizens of the state generally."

Biggs' name features on the Frieze of the London School of Hygiene & Tropical Medicine. Twenty-three names of public health and tropical medicine pioneers were chosen to feature on the School building in Keppel Street when it was constructed in 1926.

A commemorative marker at his birthplace in Trumansburg was erected in November 2019.
