= List of mayors of New York City =

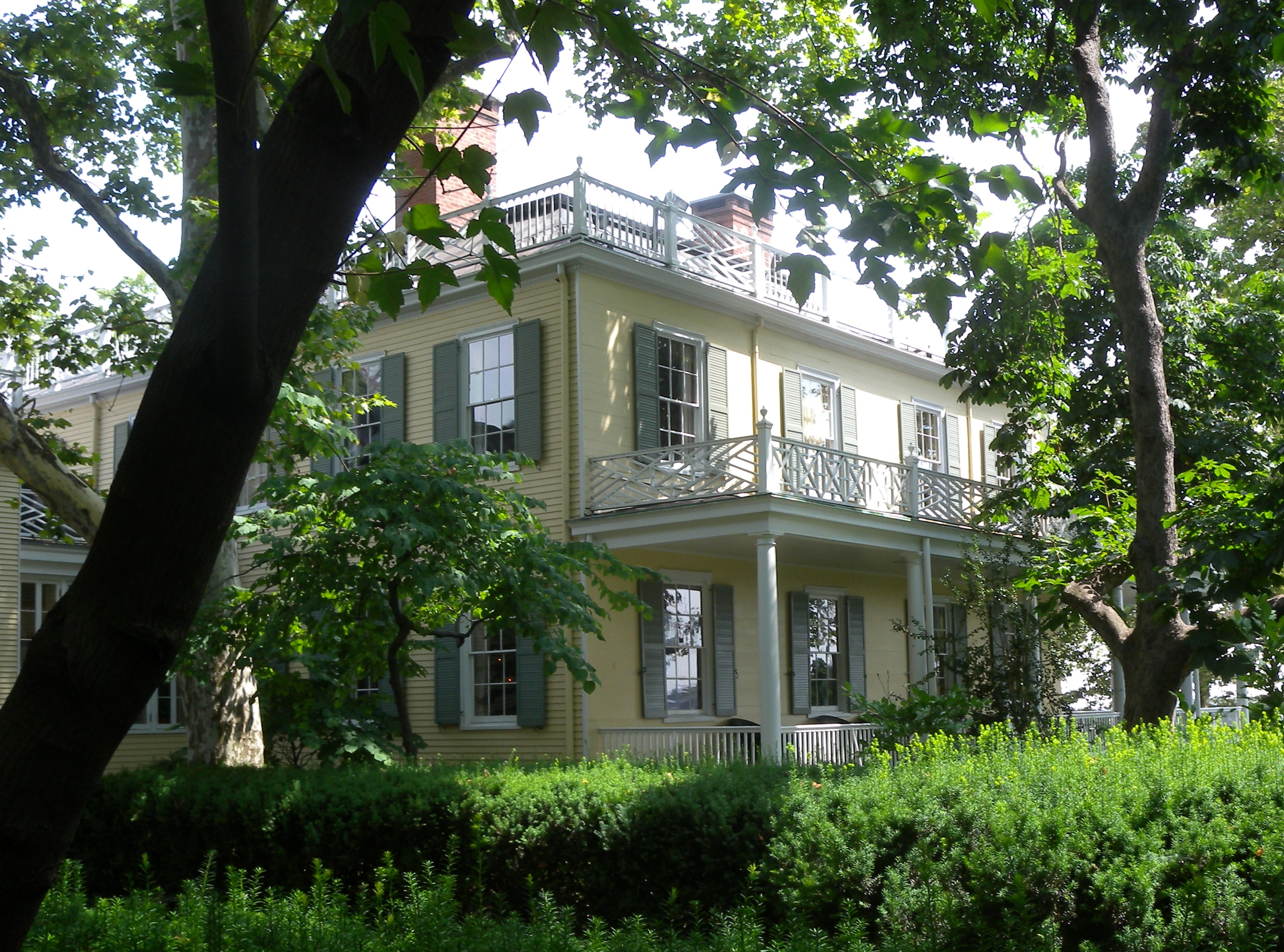
Gracie Mansion, the official residence of the mayor of New York City since 1942

The mayor of New York City is the chief executive of the Government of New York City, as stipulated by New York City's charter. The current officeholder, the 112th in the sequence of regular mayors, is Zohran Mamdani, a member of the Democratic Party.

During the Dutch colonial period from 1624 to 1664, New Amsterdam was governed by the Director of New Netherland. Following the 1664 creation of the British Province of New York, newly renamed New York City was run by the British military governor, Richard Nicolls. The office of Mayor of New York City was established in 1665. Holders were appointed by colonial governors, beginning with Thomas Willett. The position remained appointed until 1777. That year, during the American Revolution, a Council of Appointment was formed by the State of New York. In 1821 the New York City Council – then known as the Common Council – began appointing mayors. Since 1834, mayors have been elected by direct popular vote.

The city included little beyond the island of Manhattan before 1874, when it annexed the western part of the Bronx, to be followed in 1895 by the rest of the Bronx. The 1898 consolidation created the city as it is today with five boroughs: Queens, Brooklyn, Manhattan, Staten Island and the Bronx. The first mayor of the expanded city was Robert Anderson Van Wyck.

The longest-serving mayors have been Fiorello La Guardia (1934–1945), Robert F. Wagner Jr. (1954–1965), Ed Koch (1978–1989) and Michael Bloomberg (2002–2013), each of whom was in office for twelve years (three successive four-year terms). The shortest terms in office since 1834 have been those of acting mayors: William T. Collins served a single day on December 31, 1925, Samuel B. H. Vance served one month (from November 30 to December 31, 1874), and Thomas Coman served five weeks (from November 30, 1868, to January 4, 1869).

== Colonial mayors (1665–1783) ==
Before 1680, mayors served one-year terms. From 1680, they served two-year terms.

No.	Name (birth–death)	Term	Previous office
1	Thomas Willett (c. 1607–1674); 1st term	1665–1666	Captain of the Plymouth Colony militia (1648–c. 1674)
2	Thomas Delavall (1620–1682); 1st term	1666–1667	Receiver-General of New York City
3	Thomas Willett (c. 1607–1674); 2nd term	1667–1668	Captain of the Rehoboth militia (1667)
4	Cornelius Steenwyk (1626–1684); 1st term	1668–1671	Merchant
5	Thomas Delavall (1620–1682); 2nd term	1671–1672	2nd Mayor of New York City (1666–1667)
6	Matthias Nicoll (1630–1687); 1st term	1672–1673	Secretary to the Governor of New York (1664-1669)
7	John Lawrence (1618–1699); 1st term	1673–1674	Alderman of the New York City Common Council (1665)
8 (Note: Matthias Nicoll's second non-consecutive term as mayor was erroneously excluded from the official numbering of mayors due to the contemporary records of his second term being misplaced, leading to a misnumbering of every subsequent mayor. The error was first noted as early as 1935, and was later officially corrected upon the inauguration of Zohran Mamdani in 2026.)	Matthias Nicoll (1630–1687); 2nd term	1674–1675	6th Mayor of New York City (1672–1673)
9	William Dervall (1642–c. 1711)	1675–1676	Merchant
10	Nicholas De Mayer (1635–1691)	1676–1677	Merchant
11	Stephanus van Cortlandt (1643–1700); 1st term	1677–1678	Ensign of the New York City militia (1668
12	Thomas Delavall (1620–1682); 3rd term	1678–1679	2nd & 5th Mayor of New York City (1666–1667; 1671–1672)
13	Francis Rombouts (1631–1691)	1679–1680	Alderman of the New York City Common Council (1673-1674; 1676; 1678)
14	William Dyre (1640–1688)	1680–1682	
15	Cornelius Steenwyk (1626–1684); 2nd term	1682–1684	Governor of New Holland (1676)
16	Gabriel Minvielle (c. 1650–1702)	1684–1685	Merchant and trader
17	Nicholas Bayard (c. 1644–c. 1707)	1685–1686	Member of the New York Executive Council
18	Stephanus van Cortlandt (1643–1700); 2nd term	1686–1688	11th Mayor of New York City (1677–1678)
19	Peter Delanoy (Note: Peter Delanoy was the first and only popularly-elected mayor of New York City until 1834. The office of mayor was resumed to be governor-appointed in the wake of Leisler's Rebellion.) (c. 1657–c. 1695)	1689–1691	
20	John Lawrence (1618–1699); 2nd term	1691	7th Mayor of New York City (1673–1674)
21	Abraham de Peyster (1657–1728)	1691–1694	Merchant
22 (Note: Charles Lodwick was excluded from the list of mayors of New York City until the error was officially corrected in 1937.)	Charles Lodwick (c. 1658–1723)	1694–1695	Captain of the New York City militia
23	William Merritt (c. 1640–1708)	1695–1698	
24	Johannes de Peyster (1666–1711)	1698–1699	Assistant alderman of the New York City; Common Council (1694–1696)
25	David Provost (1670–1724)	1699–1700	
26	Isaac De Riemer (c. 1666–1730)	1700–1701	Alderman of the New York City; Common Council from the West Ward (1699–1700)
27	Thomas Noell (died 1702)	1701–1702	Merchant
28	Phillip French (1667–1707)	1702–1703	Alderman of the New York City; Common Council (1701–1702)
29	William Peartree (c. 1643–c. 1714)	1703–1707	Privateer
30	Ebenezer Wilson (fl. 1650–1710)	1707–1710	Sheriff of New York County (1702–1707)
31	Jacobus van Cortlandt (1658–1739); 1st term	1710–1711	Merchant
32	Caleb Heathcote (1665–1721)	1711–1713	Founder of Westchester
33	John Johnstone (c. 1661–1732)	1714–1719	Member of the New Jersey General Assembly from Perth Amboy (1710–1714)
34	Jacobus van Cortlandt (1658–1739); 2nd term	1719–1720	31st Mayor of New York City (1710–1711)
35	Robert Walters (died 1733)	1720–1725	Associate justice of the New York; Supreme Court of Judicature (1718–1733)
36	Johannes Jansen (1665–1734)	1725–1726	Member of the New York General Assembly (1709–1711; 1716–1726)
37	Robert Lurting (c. 1650–1735)	1726–1735 (Note: Died in office)	
38	Paul Richard (1697–1756)	1735–1739	Merchant
39	John Cruger (c. 1678–1744)	1739–1744	Alderman of the New York City; Common Council from the Dock Ward (1712–1735)
40	Stephen Bayard (1700–1757)	1744–1747	Merchant
41	Edward Holland (1702–1756)	1747–1756	23rd Mayor of Albany (1733–1741)
42	John Cruger Jr. (1710–1791)	1757–1766	Merchant
43	Whitehead Hicks (1728–1780)	1766–1776	Associate justice of the New York; Supreme Court of Judicature
44	David Mathews (c. 1739–1800)	1776–1783	Clerk of Orange County (1762–1778)

== Pre-consolidation mayors (1784–1897) ==
The mayor continued to be selected by the Government of New York's Council of Appointment until 1821, when Stephen Allen became the first mayor appointed by the New York City Common Council. Under the Charter of 1834, mayors were elected annually by direct popular vote. Starting in 1849, mayors were elected to serve two-year terms.

No.	Portrait	Name (birth–death)	Term	Party	Election	Previous office
45		James Duane (1733–1797)	January 1, 1784 – 1789	Unaffiliated	–	Member of the Congress of the Confederation from New York (1781–1783)
46		Richard Varick (1753–1831)	October 12, 1789 – December 31, 1801	Federalist	–	2nd Attorney General of New York (1788–1789)
47		Edward Livingston (1764–1836)	1801 – 1803	Democratic-Republican	–	Member of the U.S. House of Representatives from New York's 2nd district (1795–1801)
48		DeWitt Clinton (1769–1828); 1st term	1803 – 1807	Democratic-Republican	–	United States Senator from New York (1802–1803)
49		Marinus Willett (1740–1830)	1807 – 1808	Democratic-Republican	–	Sheriff of New York County (1784–1787; 1791–1795)
50		DeWitt Clinton (1769–1828); 2nd term	1808 – 1810	Democratic-Republican	–	48th Mayor of New York City (1803–1807)
51		Jacob Radcliff (1764–1844); 1st term	February 13, 1810 – 1811	Federalist	–	Justice of the New York Supreme Court (1798–1804)
52		DeWitt Clinton (1769–1828); 3rd term	1811 – 1815	Democratic-Republican	–	48th & 50th Mayor of New York City (1803–1807; 1808–1810)
53		John Ferguson (c. 1777–1832)	March 6, 1815 – July 9, 1815 (Note: Resigned from office)	Democratic-Republican	–	Naval officer of the Port of New York (1813–1832)
54		Jacob Radcliff (1764–1844); 2nd term	July 10, 1815 – 1818	Federalist	–	51st Mayor of New York City (1810–1811)
55		Cadwallader D. Colden (1769–1834)	1818 – 1821	Federalist	–	Member of the New York State Assembly from the 1st district (1818)
56		Stephen Allen (1767–1852)	1821 – 1824	Federalist	–	Assistant alderman of the New York City Common Council from the 10th ward (1817–1821)
57		William Paulding Jr. (1770–1854); 1st term	1825 – 1826	Unaffiliated	–	Member of the U.S. House of Representatives from New York's 2nd district (1811–1813)
58		Philip Hone (1780–1851)	1826 – 1827	Federalist	–	Member of the New York City Board of Assistant Aldermen from the 3rd ward (1824–1825)
59		William Paulding Jr. (1770–1854); 2nd term	1827 – 1829	Unaffiliated	–	57th Mayor of New York City (1825–1826)
60		Walter Bowne (1770–1846)	1829 – 1833	Democratic	–	Member of the New York State Senate from the 1st district (1823–1824)
61		Gideon Lee (1778–1841)	1833 – 1834	Democratic	–	Member of the New York City Board of Aldermen (1828–1830)
62		Cornelius Lawrence (1791–1861)	1834 – 1837	Democratic	1834 1835 1836	Member of the U.S. House of Representatives from New York's 3rd district (1833–1834)
63		Aaron Clark (1787–1861)	1837 – 1839	Whig	1837 1838	Member of the New York City Board of Aldermen from the 1st ward (1835–1837)
64		Isaac L. Varian (1793–1864)	1839 – 1841	Democratic	1839 1840	Member of the New York State Assembly from New York County (1831–1833)
65		Robert H. Morris (1808–1855)	1841 – 1844	Democratic	1841 1842 1843	18th Recorder of New York City (1838–1841)
66		James Harper (1795–1869)	1844 – 1845	American Republican	1844	Partner at Harper & Brothers (1817–1869)
67		William Frederick Havemeyer (1804–1874); 1st term	1845 – 1846	Democratic	1845	Presidential elector from New York (1844)
68		Andrew H. Mickle (1805–1863)	1846 – 1847	Democratic	1846	New York City public school trustee from the 1st ward (1845)
69		William V. Brady (1811–1870)	1847 – 1848	Whig	1847	Member of the New York City Board of Aldermen (1842–1847)
70		William Frederick Havemeyer (1804–1874); 2nd term	1848 – 1849	Democratic	1848	67th Mayor of New York City (1845–1846)
71		Caleb Smith Woodhull (1792–1866)	1849 – 1851	Whig	1849	President of the New York City Board of Aldermen (1843)
72		Ambrose Kingsland (1804–1878)	1851 – 1853	Whig	1850	Commissioner of the Croton Aqueduct (1848)
73		Jacob Aaron Westervelt (1800–1879)	1853 – 1855	Democratic	1852	Member of the New York City Board of Aldermen from the 13th ward (1840–1842)
74		Fernando Wood (1812–1881); 1st term	January 1, 1855 – December 31, 1857 (Note: As a result of a conflict between the Republican-dominated New York State Legislature and the Tammany Hall political machine, Fernando Wood's second consecutive term as mayor was shortened by a year through a vote passed by both chambers of the legislature to revise the New York City Charter. A mayoral election for a standard-length term was held later that year, resulting in the incumbent Wood's loss to independent candidate Daniel F. Tiemann.)	Democratic	1854 1856	Member of the U.S. House of Representatives from New York's 3rd district (1841–1843)
75		Daniel F. Tiemann (1805–1899)	January 1, 1858 – December 31, 1859	Unaffiliated	1857	Member of the Board of Governors of the New York City Alms House (1855–1857)
76		Fernando Wood (1812–1881); 2nd term	January 1, 1860 – December 31, 1861	Democratic	1859	74th Mayor of New York City (1855–1857)
77		George Opdyke (1805–1880)	1862 – 1864	Republican	1861	Member of the New York State Assembly from the 14th district (1859)
78		Charles Godfrey Gunther (1822–1885)	1864 – 1866	Democratic	1863	President of the Board of Governors of the New York City Alms House (1855–1860)
79		John T. Hoffman (1828–1888)	January 1, 1866 – November 30, 1868	Democratic	1865 1867	25th Recorder of New York City (1861–1866)
Acting		Thomas Coman (1836–1909)	November 30, 1868 (Note: Thomas Coman became acting mayor upon the resignation of John T. Hoffman.) – January 4, 1869	Democratic	–	President of the New York City Board of Aldermen (1868–1871)
80		A. Oakey Hall (Note: Common Council president John Cochrane served as acting mayor when A. Oakey Hall temporarily stepped down from office in January 1872.) (1826–1898)	January 4, 1869 – December 31, 1872	Democratic	1868 1870	District Attorney of New York County (1855–1858; 1862–1871)
81		William Frederick Havemeyer (1804–1874); 3rd term	January 1, 1873 – November 30, 1874	Republican	1872	President of the Bank of North America (1851–1861)
Acting		Samuel B. H. Vance (1814–1890)	November 30, 1874 (Note: Samuel B. H. Vance became acting mayor upon the death of William Frederick Havemeyer.) – December 31, 1874	Republican	–	President of the New York City Board of Aldermen (1873–1874)
82		William H. Wickham (1832–1893)	January 1, 1875 – December 31, 1876	Democratic	1874	President of the New York City Fire Department (1860–1861)
83		Smith Ely Jr. (1825–1911)	January 1, 1877 – December 31, 1878	Democratic	1876	Member of the U.S. House of Representatives from New York's 7th district (1871–1873; 1875–1876)
84		Edward Cooper (1824–1905)	January 1, 1879 – December 31, 1880	Democratic	1878	Member of the Commission to Devise a Plan for the Government of Cities in the State of New York (1875–1876)
85		William Russell Grace (1832–1904); 1st term	January 1, 1881 – December 31, 1882	Democratic	1880	President of W. R. Grace & Co. (1872–1904)
86		Franklin Edson (1832–1904)	January 1, 1883 – December 31, 1884	Democratic	1882	President of the New York Produce Exchange
87		William Russell Grace (1832–1904); 2nd term	January 1, 1885 – December 31, 1886	Unaffiliated	1884	President of W. R. Grace & Co. (1872–1904)
88		Abram Hewitt (1822–1903)	January 1, 1887 – December 31, 1888	Democratic	1886	Member of the U.S. House of Representatives from New York's 10th district (1875–1879; 1881–1886)
89		Hugh J. Grant (1858–1910)	January 1, 1889 – December 31, 1892	Democratic	1888 1890	Sheriff of New York County (1887–1888)
90		Thomas Francis Gilroy (1840–1911)	January 1, 1893 – December 31, 1894	Democratic	1892	Undersheriff of New York County
91		William Lafayette Strong (1827–1900)	January 1, 1895 – December 31, 1897 (Note: William Lafayette Strong served an additional year in office because New York City mayoral elections were changed to be held in odd-numbered years due to the impending consolidation of the city.)	Republican	1894	President of the First National Bank

== Post-consolidation mayors (since 1897) ==
The first post-consolidation mayoral term was four years long. The New York City Charter was revised to make the mayor's term two-years in length beginning in 1902, but after two such terms was reverted to four-year terms in 1906. George B. McClellan Jr. thus served one two-year term from 1904 to 1905, during which he was elected to a four-year term from 1906 to 1909. Since then, mayors have had to be elected with the support of all five boroughs: Queens, Brooklyn, Manhattan, Staten Island, and the Bronx.

The party of the mayor reflects party registration, as opposed to the party lines run under during the general election.

No.	Portrait	Name (birth–death)	Term	Party	Election	Previous office
92		Robert Anderson Van Wyck (Note: City Council president Randolph Gugghenheimer served as acting mayor multiple times throughout the mayoralty of Robert Anderson Van Wyck whenever Van Wyck was not present in the city.) (1849–1918)	January 1, 1898 – December 31, 1901	Democratic	1897	Chief Justice of the City Court of New York
93		Seth Low (1850–1916)	January 1, 1902 – December 31, 1903	Republican	1901	11th President of Columbia University (1890–1901)
94		George B. McClellan Jr. (1865–1940)	January 1, 1904 – December 31, 1909	Democratic	1903 1905	Member of the U.S. House of Representatives from New York's 12th district (1895–1903)
95		William Jay Gaynor (1849–1913)	January 1, 1910 – September 10, 1913	Democratic	1909	Justice of the New York Supreme Court (1893–1909)
Acting		Ardolph L. Kline (1858–1930)	September 10, 1913 (Note: Ardolph L. Kline became acting mayor upon the death of William Jay Gaynor) – December 31, 1913	Republican	–	President of the New York City Board of Aldermen (1913)
96		John Purroy Mitchel (1879–1918)	January 1, 1914 – December 31, 1917	Republican	1913	Collector of the Port of New York (1913)
97		John Francis Hylan (1868–1936)	January 1, 1918 – December 30, 1925	Democratic	1917 1921	Judge in Kings County
Acting		William T. Collins (1886–1961)	December 31, 1925 (Note: William T. Collins became acting mayor upon the resignation of John Francis Hylan, one day prior to the inauguration of Jimmy Walker.)	Democratic	–	President of the New York City Board of Aldermen (1925)
98		Jimmy Walker (1881–1946)	January 1, 1926 – September 1, 1932	Democratic	1925 1929	Member of the New York State Senate from the 12th district (1919–1925)
Acting		Joseph V. McKee (1889–1956)	September 1, 1932 (Note: Joseph V. McKee became acting mayor upon the resignation of Jimmy Walker.) – December 31, 1932	Democratic	–	President of the New York City Board of Aldermen (1926–1933)
99		John P. O'Brien (1873–1951)	January 1, 1933 – December 31, 1933	Democratic	1932	Surrogate of New York County
100		Fiorello La Guardia (1882–1947)	January 1, 1934 – December 31, 1945	Republican	1933 1937 1941	Member of the U.S. House of Representatives from New York's 20th district (1923–1933)
101		William O'Dwyer (1890–1964)	January 1, 1946 – August 31, 1950	Democratic	1945 1949	District Attorney of Kings County (1940–1942; 1945)
102		Vincent R. Impellitteri (1900–1987)	November 14, 1950 (Note: Vincent R. Impellitteri became acting mayor upon the resignation of William O'Dwyer on August 31, 1950, and was then elected mayor in a special election held on November 7. He was inaugurated a week later on November 14.) – December 31, 1953	Democratic	1950	President of the New York City Council (1946–1950)
103		Robert F. Wagner Jr. (1910–1991)	January 1, 1954 – December 31, 1965	Democratic	1953 1957 1961	17th Borough President of Manhattan (1950–1953)
104		John Lindsay (1921–2000)	January 1, 1966 – December 31, 1973	Republican (Note: John Lindsay left the Republican Party in favor of the Democratic Party in 1971 in preparation for his unsuccessful campaign for the Democratic nomination for U.S. president in the following year.) Democratic	1965 1969	Member of the U.S. House of Representatives from New York's 17th district (1959–1965)
105		Abraham Beame (1906–2001)	January 1, 1974 – December 31, 1977	Democratic	1973	36th & 38th New York City Comptroller (1962–1965; 1970–1973)
106		Ed Koch (1924–2013)	January 1, 1978 – December 31, 1989	Democratic	1977 1981 1985	Member of the U.S. House of Representatives from New York's 18th district (1969–1977)
107		David Dinkins (1927–2020)	January 1, 1990 – December 31, 1993	Democratic	1989	23rd Borough President of Manhattan (1986–1989)
108		Rudy Giuliani (b. 1944)	January 1, 1994 – December 31, 2001	Republican	1993 1997	United States Attorney for the Southern District of New York (1983–1989)
109		Michael Bloomberg (b. 1942)	January 1, 2002 – December 31, 2013	Republican (Note: Michael Bloomberg was a lifelong member of the Democratic Party before registering as a Republican in 2001 and running for mayor. He left the Republican Party in 2007 and ran as an independent candidate in the 2009 mayoral election, later registering as a Democrat again in 2018 in preparation for his unsuccessful campaign for the Democratic nomination for U.S. president in 2020.) Unaffiliated	2001 2005 2009	CEO of Bloomberg L.P. (1981–2001)
110		Bill de Blasio (b. 1961)	January 1, 2014 – December 31, 2021	Democratic	2013 2017	3rd New York City Public Advocate (2010–2013)
111		Eric Adams (b. 1960)	January 1, 2022 – December 31, 2025	Democratic	2021	18th Borough President of Brooklyn (2014–2021)
112		Zohran Mamdani (b. 1991)	January 1, 2026 – Incumbent	Democratic	2025	Member of the New York State Assembly from the 36th district (2021–2025)

== Appendices ==
=== Official misnumbering ===
In 1937, Charles Lodwick, who served as mayor from 1694 to 1695, was inserted as the city's 21st mayor, increasing the official numbering of all subsequent mayors by one.

In December 2025, another official numbering issue affecting all mayors after John Lawrence's first term in 1673 was widely reported. Similar to American presidents, mayors are counted twice in the official numbering if they served non-consecutive terms. Matthias Nicoll, who was the sixth mayor from 1672–73, was appointed to a non-consecutive term by governor Edmund Andros in 1674 as the city's eighth mayor after the city was returned to English control following the Dutch reconquest during Third Anglo-Dutch War as part of the Treaty of Westminster, but his second term was erroneously omitted in official records. The error appeared in official numberings from as early as an 1841 Manual of the Corporation of the City of New York. The New York City Department of Records and Information Services located original court documents corroborating Nicoll's second term after reporting by Gothamist the same month. The error had previously been noted by various researchers since as early as 1935.

The outgoing administration of Eric Adams declined to address the issue in its final weeks. On January 1, 2026, as Zohran Mamdani was sworn into office his official website called him the 112th mayor. In his inauguration speech, Mamdani joked about the misnumbering, saying "I stand before you ... honored to serve as either your 111th or 112th Mayor of New York City."

=== Mayoral terms and term limits in New York City since 1834 ===
Direct elections to the mayoralty of the unconsolidated City of New York began in 1834 for a term of one year, extended to two years after 1849. The 1897 Charter of the consolidated City stipulated that the mayor was to be elected for a single four-year term. In 1901, the term halved to two years, with no restrictions on reelection. In 1905, the term was extended to four years once again. (Mayors Fiorello La Guardia, Robert F. Wagner Jr., Ed Koch and Michael Bloomberg were later able to serve for twelve years each.) In 1993, the voters approved a two-term (eight-year) limit, and reconfirmed this limit when the issue was submitted to referendum in 1996. In 2008, the New York City Council voted to change the two-term limit to three terms (without submitting the issue to the voters). Legal challenges to the Council's action were rejected by Federal courts in January and April 2009. However, in 2010, yet another referendum, reverting the limit to two terms, passed overwhelmingly.

Year	Term	Term limit	Years	Mayor(s) affected
1834	1 year	(no limit)	(unlimited)	all from Cornelius Van Wyck Lawrence to Caleb S. Woodhull
1849	2 years	(no limit)	(unlimited)	all from Ambrose Kingsland to William L. Strong^{1}
Greater New York (The Five Boroughs)
1897	4 years	1 term	4 years	Robert A. Van Wyck
1901	2 years	(no limit)	(unlimited)	Seth Low and George B. McClellan Jr.^{2}
1905	4 years	(no limit)	(unlimited)	all from George B. McClellan Jr.^{2} to David Dinkins^{3}
1993	4 years	2 terms	8 years	Rudolph Giuliani^{4}
2008	4 years	3 terms	12 years	Michael Bloomberg only ^{4, 5}
2010	4 years	2 terms	8 years	Bill de Blasio and his successors^{6}

Principal source: The Encyclopedia of New York City especially the entries for "charter" and "mayoralty".

1. Mayor Strong, elected in 1894, served an extra year because no municipal election was held in 1896, in anticipation of the consolidated City's switch to odd-year elections.
2. George B. McClellan Jr. was elected to one two-year term (1904–1906) and one four-year term (1906-1910).
3. David Dinkins was not affected by the term limit enacted in 1993 because he had served only one term by 1993 and failed to win re-election.
4. The September 11 attacks on the World Trade Center in Manhattan coincided with the primary elections for a successor to Mayor Giuliani, who was completing his second and final term of office. Many were so impressed by both the urgency of the situation and Giuliani's response that they wanted to keep him in office beyond December 31, 2001, either by removing the term limit or by extending his service for a few months. However, neither happened, the primary elections (with the same candidates) were re-run on September 25, the general election was held as scheduled on November 6, and Michael Bloomberg took office on the regularly appointed date of January 1, 2002.
5. On October 2, 2008, Michael Bloomberg announced that he would ask the city council to extend the limit for mayor, council and other officers from two terms to three, and that, should such an extended limit prevail, he himself would seek re-election as mayor. On October 23, the New York City Council voted 29–22 to extend the two-term limit to three terms. (A proposed amendment to submit the vote to a public referendum had failed earlier the same day by a vote of 22–28 with one abstention.)
6. In November 2010, yet another popular referendum, limiting mayoral terms to two, passed overwhelmingly.

==== Interrupted terms ====
Mayors John T. Hoffman (1866–1868, elected Governor 1868), William Havemeyer (1845–1846, 1848–1849, and 1873–1874), William Jay Gaynor (1910–1913), John Francis Hylan (1918–1925), Jimmy Walker (1926–1932), and William O'Dwyer (1946–1950) failed to complete the final terms to which they were elected. The uncompleted mayoral terms of Hoffman, Walker, and O'Dwyer were added to the other offices elected in (respectively) 1868, 1932, and 1950. Those three elections are listed as "special" in the table below because they occurred before the next regularly scheduled mayoral election; the "regular" mayoral elections of 1874 and 1913, on the other hand, were held on the same day that they would have happened had the mayoralty not become vacant.

Interrupted terms of New York City's elected mayors since 1834
Elected mayor	Last elected	End of service	Interim successor † ^{1, 2}	Election	Elected successor^{3}
John T. Hoffman (D)	Dec. 1867	resigned November 30, 1868	Thomas Coman (D)	Dec. 1868 (special)	A. Oakey Hall (D)
W^{m} Havemeyer (R)^{1}	Nov. 1872	died November 30, 1874	Samuel B. H. Vance (R)	Nov. 1874 (regular)	William H. Wickham (D)
William Gaynor (D)	Nov. 1909	died September 10, 1913	Ardolph L. Kline (R)	Nov. 1913 (regular)	John P. Mitchel (R)
John F. Hylan (D)	Nov. 1921	resigned December 30, 1925	William T. Collins (D)	Nov. 1925 (regular)	Jimmy Walker (D)
Jimmy Walker (D)	Nov. 1929	resigned September 1, 1932	Joseph V. McKee (D)	Nov. 1932 (special)	John P. O'Brien (D)
William O'Dwyer (D)	Nov. 1949	resigned August 31, 1950	Vincent Impellitteri (D)	Nov. 1950 (special)	Vincent Impellitteri (D)

† Became acting mayor as the president of the board of aldermen or (in 1950) city council.

(D) = (Democratic)

(R) = (Republican)

1. Mayor Havemeyer was a Democrat who ran as a Republican against the Democratic Tweed Ring in 1872.
2. Acting Mayors Coman, Vance, Kline and Collins did not seek election as mayor.
3. Acting Mayors McKee and Impellitteri were Democrats who lost the Democratic primary to succeed themselves, but still ran in the general election as independents.
4. Elected Mayor Oakey Hall won re-election, while Mayor Wickham did not seek it. Mayors Mitchel and O'Brien lost attempts at re-election, while Mayor Impellitteri did not run for a full term in the 1953 regular general election after losing the Democratic primary.

=== List of mayors of the City of Brooklyn (1834–1897) ===
Brooklyn elected a mayor from 1834 until its consolidation into the City of Greater New York in 1898, whose own second mayor, Seth Low, had been mayor of Brooklyn from 1881 to 1885. Since 1898, Brooklyn has, in place of a separate mayor, elected a borough president.

Mayors of the City of Brooklyn
No.	Name (birth–death)	Term	Party
1	George Hall (1795–1868); 1st term	1834	Whig
2	Jonathan Trotter (c. 1797–1865)	1835–1836	Democratic
3	Jeremiah Johnson (1766–1852)	1837–1838	Whig
4	Cyrus P. Smith (1800–1877)	1839–1841	Whig
5	Henry C. Murphy (1810–1882)	1842	Democratic
6	Joseph Sprague (1783–1854)	1843–1844	Democratic
7	Thomas G. Talmage (1801–1863)	1845	Democratic
8	Francis B. Stryker (1811–1892)	1846–1849	Whig
9	Edward Copland (1793–1859)	1849–1850	Whig
10	Samuel Smith (1788–1872)	1850	Democratic
11	Conklin Brush (1794–1870)	1851–1852	Whig
12	Edward A. Lambert (1813–1885)	1853–1854	Democratic
13	George Hall (1795–1868); 2nd term	1855–1856	American
14	Samuel S. Powell (1815–1879); 1st term	1857–1860	Democratic
15	Martin Kalbfleisch (1804–1873); 1st term	1861–1863	Democratic
16	Alfred M. Wood (1825–1895)	1864–1865	Republican
17	Samuel Booth (1818–1894)	1866–1867	Republican
18	Martin Kalbfleisch (1804–1873); 2nd term	1868–1871	Democratic
19	Samuel S. Powell (1815–1879); 2nd term	1872–1873	Democratic
20	John W. Hunter (1807–1900)	1874–1875	Democratic
21	Frederick A. Schroeder (1833–1899)	1876–1877	Republican
22	James Howell (1829–1897)	1878–1880	Democratic
23	Seth Low (1850–1916)	1881–1885	Republican
24	Daniel D. Whitney (1819–1914)	1886–1887	Democratic
25	Alfred C. Chapin (1848–1936)	1888–1891	Democratic
26	David A. Boody (1837–1930)	1892–1893	Democratic
27	Charles A. Schieren (1842–1915)	1894–1895	Republican
28	Frederick W. Wurster (1850–1917)	1896–1897	Republican

=== List of mayors of Long Island City (1870–1897) ===
Long Island City, now a neighborhood within the borough of Queens, was incorporated as a city on May 4, 1870 and was consolidated into the present City of Greater New York on January 1, 1898, along with the city of Brooklyn and several other municipalities in the counties of Queens and Richmond.

Mayors of the City of Long Island City
No.	Name (birth–death)	Term	Party
1	Abram D. Ditmars (1822–1899); 1st term	1870–1872	Democratic
2	Henry S. DeBevoise (Note: George H. Hunter served as acting mayor from September 1873 to April 1874 while Henry S. DeBevoise temporarily stepped down from office.) (1841–1897); 1st term	1872–1875	Democratic
3	Abram D. Ditmars (1822–1899); 2nd term	1875	Democratic
Acting	John Quinn (fl. 1800s)	1876	Democratic
4	Henry S. DeBevoise (1841–1897); 2nd term	1876–1883	Democratic
5	George Petry (1833–1890)	1883–1886	Democratic
6	Patrick J. Gleason (1844–1901); 1st term	1887–1892	Democratic
7	Horatio S. Sanford (died 1933)	1893–1895	Democratic
8	Patrick J. Gleason (1844–1901); 2nd term	1895–1897	Democratic

== See also ==
- Election results for Mayor of New York
- History of New York City
- History of Brooklyn
- List of governors of New York
