= William T. Collins =

American politician

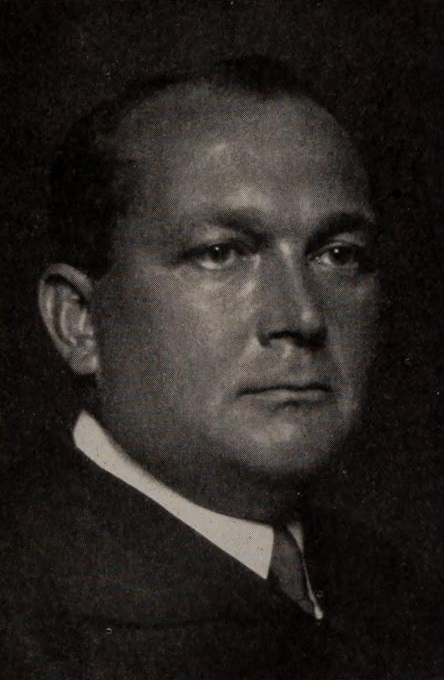

Mayor of New York City
- Acting; December 31, 1925
- Preceded by: John F. Hylan
- Succeeded by: Jimmy Walker

11th President of the New York City Board of Aldermen
- In office January 8, 1925 – December 31, 1925
- Preceded by: Murray Hulbert
- Succeeded by: Joseph V. McKee

Justice of the New York Supreme Court, 1st district
- In office 1928–1945

Personal details
- Born: June 30, 1886 New York City, U.S.
- Died: September 4, 1961 (aged 75) Brightwaters, New York, U.S.
- Cause of death: Heart attack
- Resting place: Calvary Cemetery, Woodside, New York
- Party: Democratic
- Spouse: Mae Godfrey (died 1960)
- Parent: Jeremiah Collins (father)
- Education: Fordham University

William Thomas Collins (June 30, 1886 - September 4, 1961) was an American politician, lawyer, and jurist who served as acting mayor of New York City for one day on December 31, 1925, after the retirement of John Francis Hylan. He was a member of the Democratic Party and served as the president of the New York City Board of Aldermen before becoming acting mayor. After serving as acting mayor, he went on to serve as a justice from the 1st district of the New York Supreme Court from 1928 to 1945.

Political offices
Preceded by John Francis Hylan	Mayor of New York City; Acting; 1925	Succeeded by Jimmy Walker
