= Joseph V. McKee =

American politician (1889–1956)

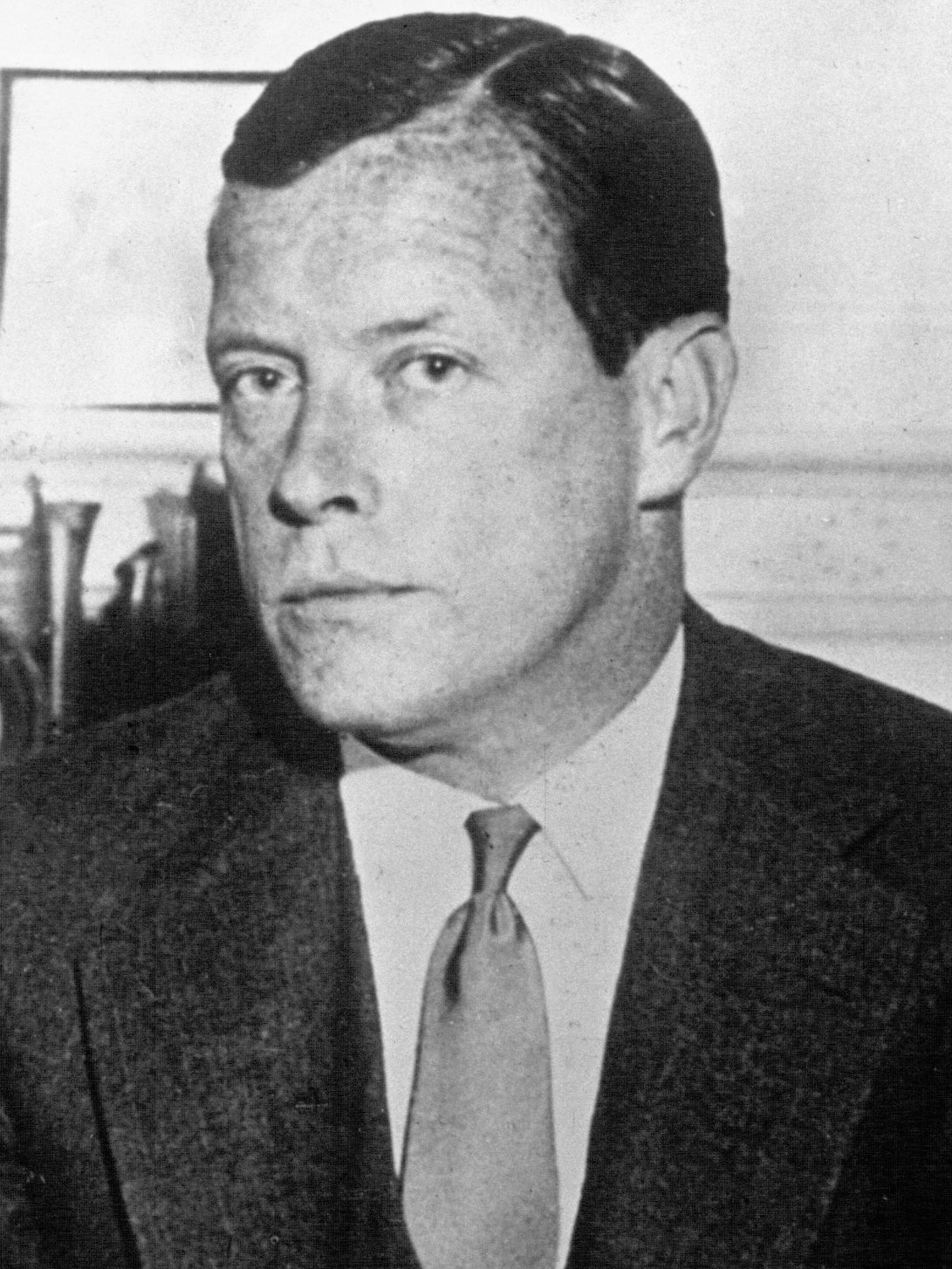
- McKee in 1932

Acting Mayor of New York City
- In office September 1, 1932 – December 31, 1932
- Preceded by: James J. Walker
- Succeeded by: John P. O'Brien

12th President of the New York City Board of Aldermen
- In office January 1, 1926 – May 15, 1933
- Preceded by: William T. Collins
- Succeeded by: Dennis J. Mahon (acting)

Member of the New York State Assembly from the 1st Bronx district
- In office January 1, 1918 – December 31, 1923
- Succeeded by: John F. Reidy

Personal details
- Born: Joseph Vincent McKee; August 8, 1889 New York City, New York, U.S.
- Died: January 28, 1956 (aged 66) New York City, New York, U.S.
- Political party: Democratic
- Spouse: Cornelia Kraft
- Children: Joseph V. McKee, Jr. Richard P. McKee

Joseph Vincent McKee, Sr. (August 8, 1889 – January 28, 1956) was a teacher at DeWitt Clinton High School in the Bronx, New York, who later became a politically active Democrat and briefly served as the acting mayor of New York City.

== Life and career ==
McKee was born on August 8, 1889. He married Cornelia Kraft on November 27, 1918. He was a member of the New York State Assembly (Bronx Co., 7th D.) in 1918, 1919, 1920, 1921, 1922 and 1923.

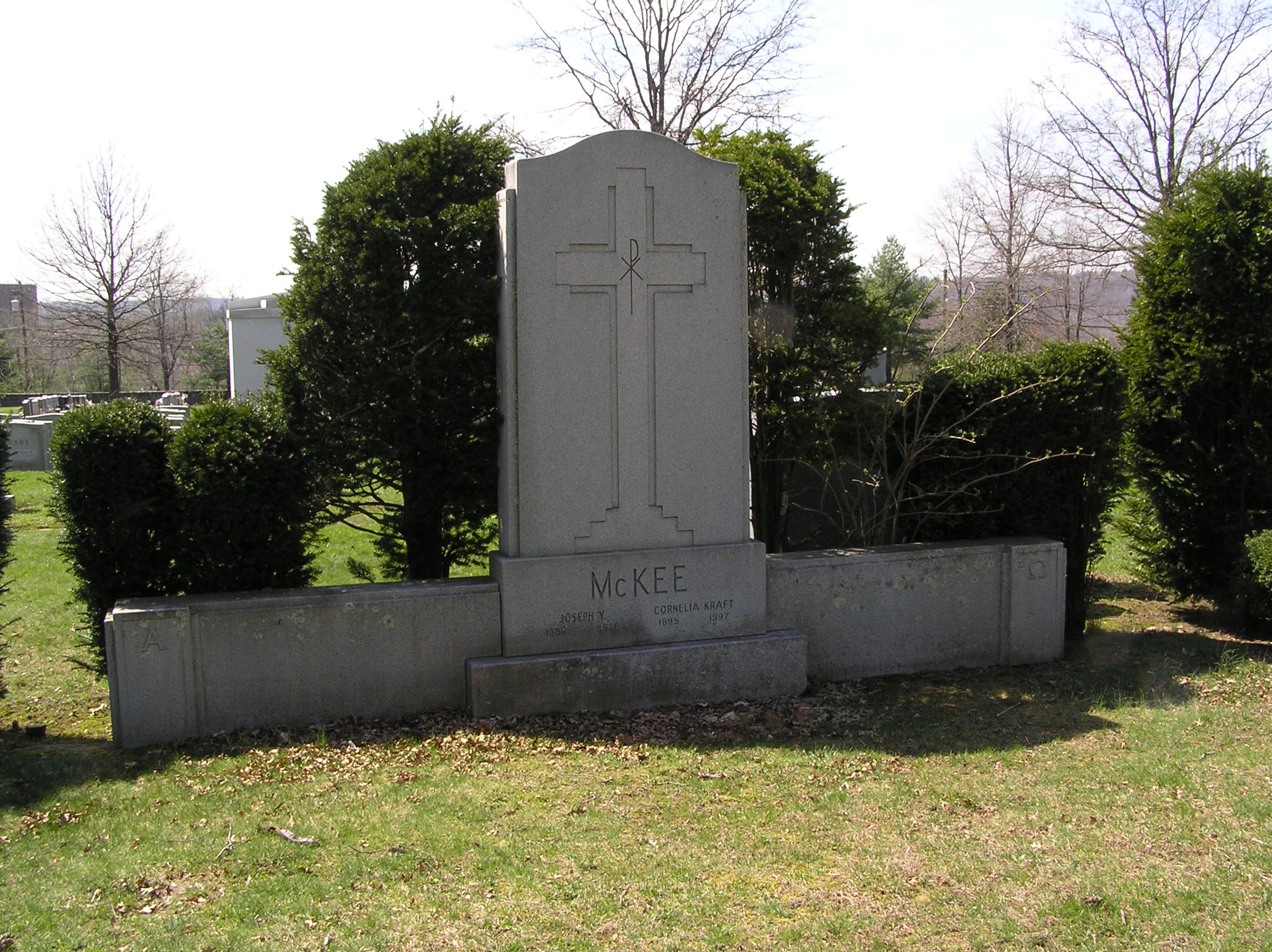
The gravesite of Mayor Joseph V. McKee in Gate of Heaven Cemetery

McKee was a municipal judge from 1924 to 1926. In 1926, he was elected president of the New York City Board of Aldermen on the ticket with James J. Walker for mayor.

McKee became acting mayor of New York City after the resignation of Mayor Walker on September 1, 1932. Walker, who resigned amid scandal and the threat of a criminal indictment, subsequently fled to Europe until the danger of prosecution appeared remote. McKee, who was sometimes mockingly referred to as "Holy Joe", running as a write-in candidate, lost a special election to John P. O'Brien in November 1932 to fill out the rest of Walker's unexpired term as mayor. His four-month term as acting mayor of New York City ended on December 31, 1932.

In November 1933, McKee ran for mayor as the Recovery Party candidate against Democratic Mayor John P. O'Brien and Republican-City Fusion Party candidate Fiorello La Guardia, but lost to La Guardia. He served as a delegate to the Democratic National Convention in 1932, 1936, 1940, and 1944.

McKee died in 1956, following a heart attack. He was buried at the Gate of Heaven Cemetery in Hawthorne, New York.

== See also ==
- List of mayors of New York City

New York State Assembly
Preceded by ?	New York State Assembly, Bronx County 7th District; 1918–1923	Succeeded by John F. Reidy
Political offices
Preceded by James J. Walker	Mayor of New York City (acting); 1932	Succeeded by John P. O'Brien
