= 1868 New York City mayoral special election =

- December 1, 1868
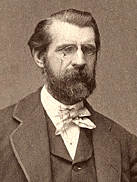

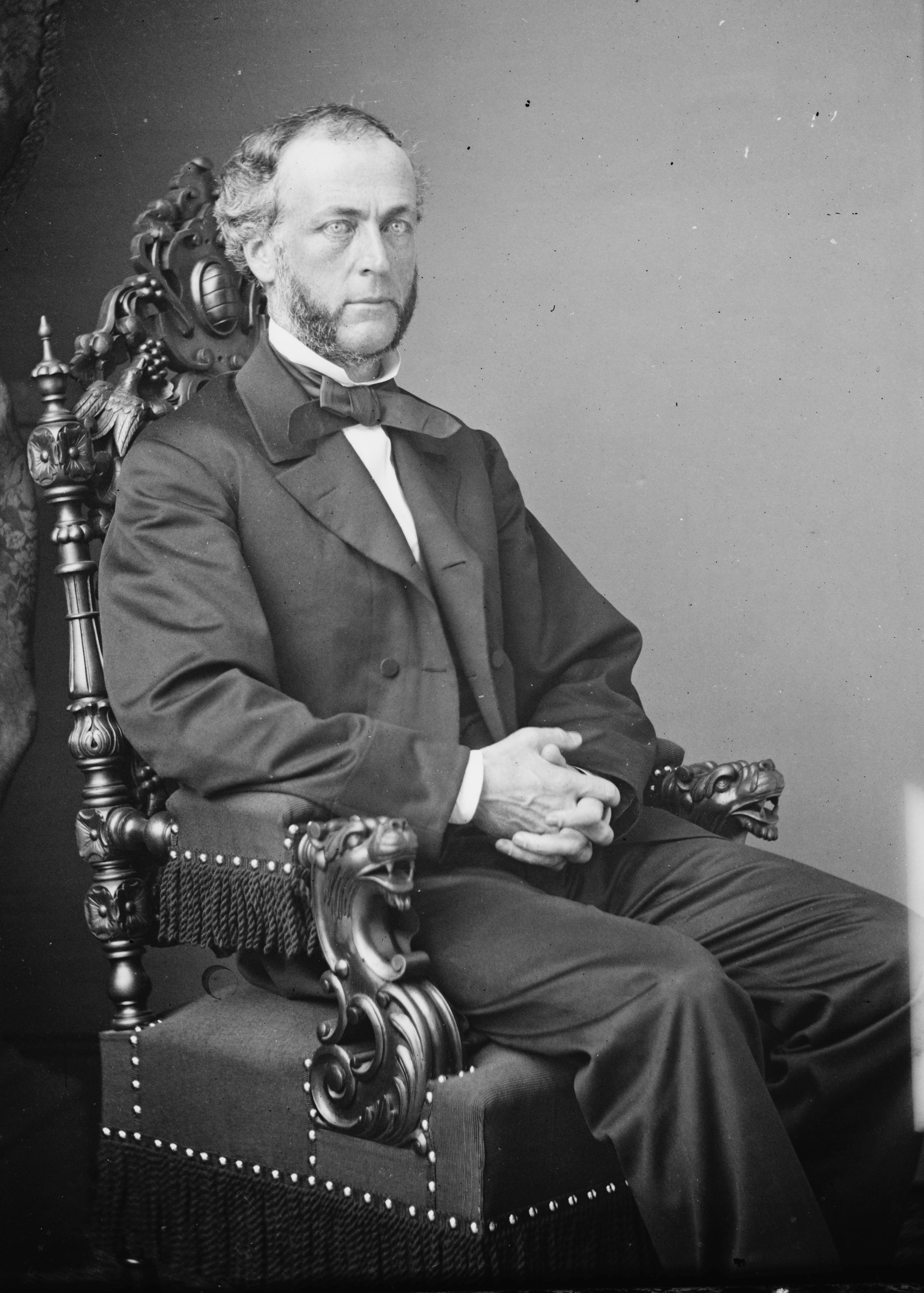
Nominee	A. Oakey Hall	Frederick A. Conkling
Party	Democratic	Republican
Alliance	Tammany Hall
Popular vote	75,109	20,835
Percentage	78.28%	21.72%
- Ward results Hall: 50-60% 60-70% 70-80% 80-90% >90%
Mayor before election
Thomas Coman
Democratic
Elected mayor
A. Oakey Hall
Democratic

The 1868 New York City mayoral special election took place on December 1, 1868, to elect the Mayor of New York City.

A. Oakey Hall, the District Attorney backed by Tammany Hall, easily beat former Republican congressman Frederick A. Conkling at the general election.

== Background ==
Following his election for governor on November 3, mayor John T. Hoffman resigned, creating a special election. Thomas Coman, the President of the Board of Aldermen, succeeded Hoffman as acting mayor.

It was essential to members of the "Tweed Ring" that its candidate, District Attorney A. Oakey Hall be elected. Oswald Ottendorfer was mentioned as a potential candidate at the convention, but he declined. Tammany Hall proceeded to nominate Hall by unanimous acclamation.

A Democratic reform group opposed to Boss Tweed's pick of Hall for mayor asked former sheriff John Kelly to run for the office, who agreed, and after which he had himself nominated at the Masonic Hall "reform" convention. He was seen as the only major threat to Hall's election, having a major influence over the Irish vote.

However, nine days after Kelly's nomination, he abruptly withdrew, citing poor health, and left for Europe. There were rumors that Kelly feared disclosure of irregularities during his time as sheriff, but no allegations surfaced. There was an attempt to nominate in Smith Ely Jr., a member of the New York County Board of Supervisors in his place, but this was unsuccessful.

== General election ==
=== Results ===
1868 New York City Mayoral special Election
Party	Candidate	Votes	%
Democratic	A. Oakey Hall	75,109	78.28%
Republican	Frederick A. Conkling	20,835	21.72%
Total votes		95,944	100.00%
