= 1874 New York City mayoral election =

- November 3, 1874
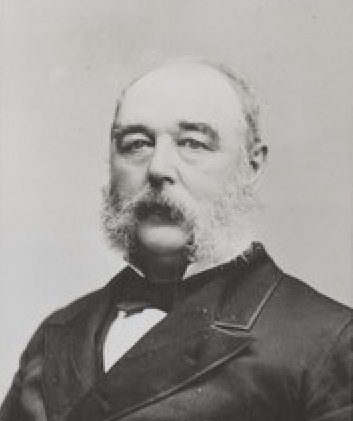

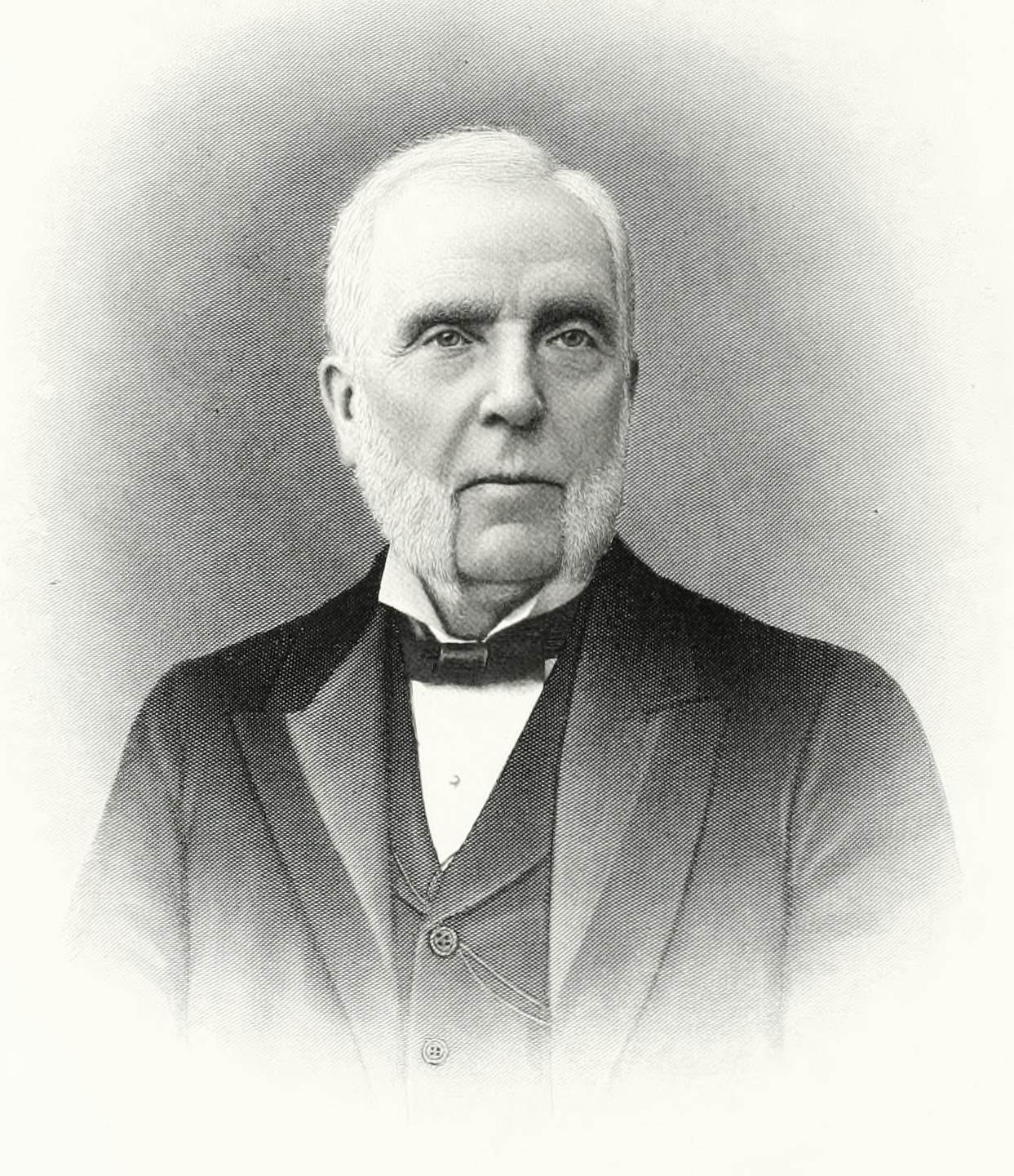

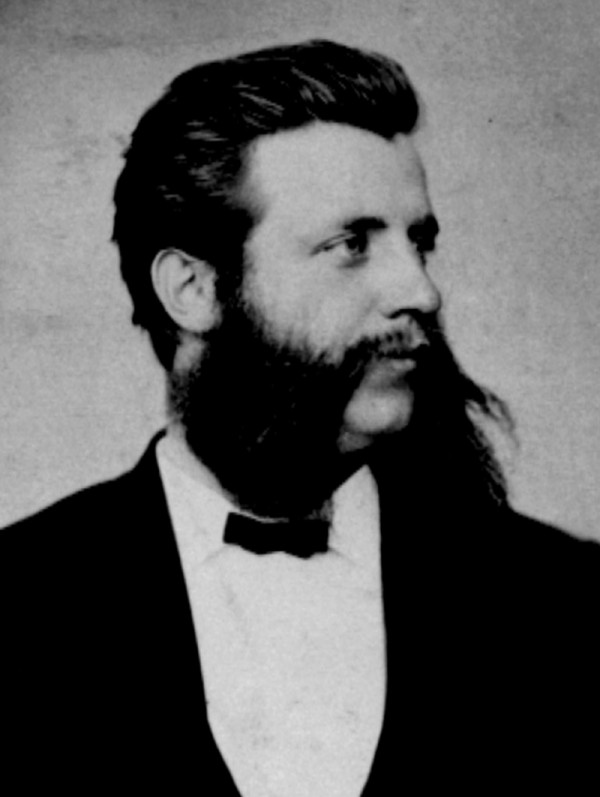
Nominee	William H. Wickham	Salem H. Wales	Oswald Ottendorfer
Party	Democratic	Republican	Independent Democratic
Popular vote	70,071	36,953	24,226
Percentage	53.39%	28.15%	18.46%
Mayor before election
William F. Havemeyer
Republican
Elected mayor
William H. Wickham
Democratic

The 1874 New York City mayoral election took place on November 3, 1874, to elect the Mayor of New York City.

William H. Wickham, a diamond merchant and member of the Committee of Seventy backed by Tammany Hall, beat Republican nominee Salem H. Wales and Independent Democratic candidate Oswald Ottendorfer.

== Background ==
Previously in September 1874, Tammany "Boss" John Kelly was in dispute with Republican mayor William F. Havemeyer over the mayor's appointment of several office holders in the city, which were opposed by the Board of Aldermen. Eventually Havemeyer, in a letter to Kelly released to the press, accused him of corruption during his time as Sheriff. Kelly sued Havemeyer for libel. However on November 30, the day the suit was to come to trial, Havemeyer fell dead of apoplexy in his office.

Economic downturn during the Panic of 1873, Mayor Havemeyer's subsequent cutting of public works, and the unpopularity of the Grant Administration led to many working-class voters defecting from the Republicans to Tammany Hall. Out of the 24,500 mechanics in the city during the Winter of 1873-74, it was estimated 15,000 were unemployed. Tammany capitalized on the opportunity to paint itself as sympathetic with workers, declaring itself in favor of giving public employment to the workers and heavily campaigned in the poorer districts of the city.

== General election ==
=== Results ===
1874 New York City Mayoral Election
Party	Candidate	Votes	%
Democratic	William H. Wickham	70,071	53.39%
Republican	Salem H. Wales	36,953	28.15%
Independent Democratic	Oswald Ottendorfer	24,226	18.46%
Total votes		131,250	100.00%
