= 1931 New York City aldermanic election =

- November 3, 1931

All 65 seats of the New York City Board of Aldermen 33 seats needed for a majority
	Majority party	Minority party
Party	Democratic	Republican
Last election	61	4
Seats won	64	1
Seat change	▲3	▼3

The 1931 New York City aldermanic election took place on November 3 to elect the 65 members of the New York City Board of Aldermen. Republicans lost three of their four seats on the Board, all of which were located in Manhattan. In 21 of Brooklyn's 24 districts the vote was better than two to one for Democratic candidates, better than six to one for Democratic candidate William O'Reilly in the 38th district.
