= 1844 New York City mayoral election =

- April 9, 1844
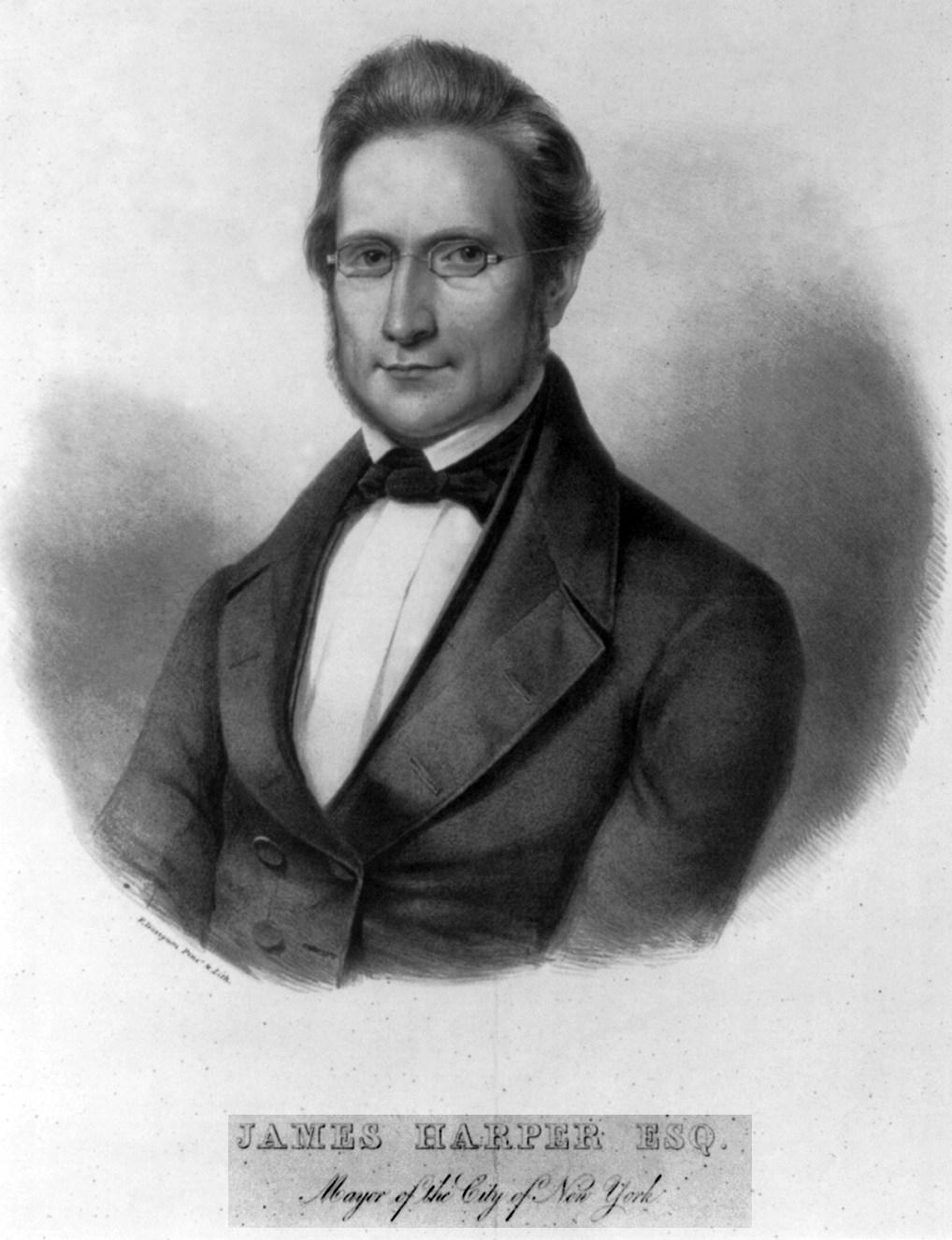

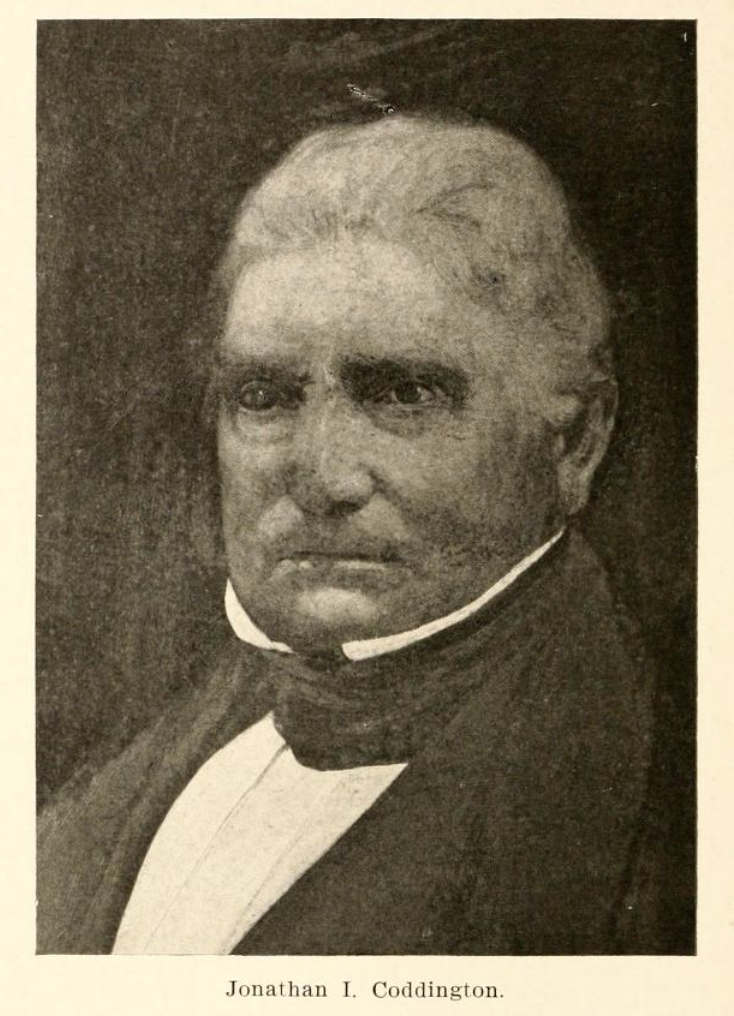

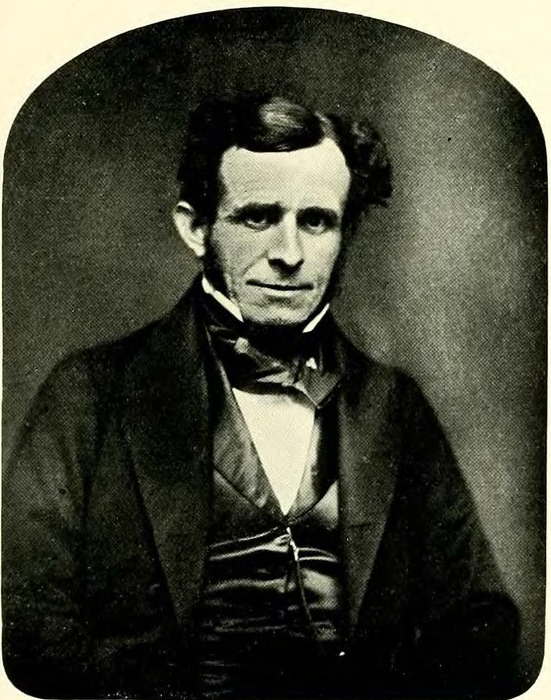
Nominee	James Harper	Jonathan I. Coddington
Party	American Republican	Democratic
Popular vote	24,500	20,558
Percentage	48.6%	40.8%
Nominee	Morris Franklin
Party	Whig
Popular vote	5,297
Percentage	10.5%
Mayor before election
Robert H. Morris
Democratic
Elected mayor
James Harper
American Republican Party (1843)

An election for Mayor of New York City was held on Tuesday, April 9, 1844.

Incumbent mayor Robert H. Morris was not a candidate for re-election to a fourth term in office. In a three-way race to succeed him, publisher James Harper won his first and only term in office over Democratic nominee Jonathan I. Coddington, and Whig candidate Morris Franklin. Harper's win was the first major electoral victory for the emerging nativist and anti-Catholic movement that would soon coalesce around the Native American Party.

== Background ==
By 1844, the increase in Irish and German immigration to the United States, especially in cities like New York and Philadelphia, had sparked a reaction among nativists, particularly those suspicious of the Roman Catholic Church. The Democratic Party—especially its powerful Tammany Hall political machine in Manhattan—welcomed both immigrants and Catholics into its ranks, and was accused of expediting naturalization and dispensing government jobs to "aliens" in exchange for their support at election time.

In 1844, New York Democrats held both U.S. Senate seats, 24 of New York's 34 seats in the House of Representatives, the Governor's office, and supermajorities in both chambers of the State Legislature. The Whigs, on the other hand, had lost the past five NYC mayoral elections, and the split with President John Tyler had cost the party invaluable opportunities for patronage by shutting it out of the federal spoils system.

The emergence of an organized nativist party in July 1843 further weakened the appeal of New York Whiggery. The American Republican Party provided disaffected voters with the opportunity to register their opposition to the two-party status quo while also supporting an energetic new movement untainted by past scandals, unaffiliated with unpopular politicians, and uninterested in polarizing topics such as the annexation of Texas, the Oregon Question, or slavery.

=== Candidates ===
- Jonathan I. Coddington, former Postmaster of New York City 1836-1842 (Democratic)
- Morris Franklin, lawyer and former New York State Senator (Whig)
- James Harper, publisher and co-founder of J. & J. Harper (American Republican)

=== Results ===
On April 9, Harper was elected mayor of New York City with only 48.6% of the vote. The Democratic nominee Jonathan I. Coddington received 40.8%, while Whig candidate Morris received a mere 10.5%. Due to the massive defection of voters to the nativist ticket, the American Republican Party carried 12 of the city's 17 wards; the Whigs won none.

1844 New York City mayoral election
Party	Candidate	Votes	%
American Republican Party (1843)	James Harper	24,500	48.64%
Democratic	Jonathan I. Coddington	20,558	40.81%
Whig	Franklin Morris	5,297	10.52%
Total votes		50,373	99.7%

=== Results by wards ===
Results by ward
Ward	Harper American		Coddington Democratic		Franklin Whig		Independent	Total	
Ward	Votes	%	Votes	%	Votes	%	Votes	Votes	%
1	912	44.46%	872	42.51%	267	13.01%	0	2,051	4.07%
2	703	51.16%	447	32.53%	223	16.22%	1	1,374	2.72%
3	1,298	56.87%	589	25.81%	393	17.22%	2	2,282	4.53%
4	1,007	36.38%	1,608	58.09%	152	5.49%	1	2,768	5.49%
5	1,367	49.04%	1,014	36.38%	406	14.56%	0	2,787	5.53%
6	722	28.92%	1,594	63.86%	180	7.21%	0	2,496	4.95%
7	2,045	52.78%	1,377	35.54%	449	11.59%	3	3,874	7.69%
8	2,222	50.95%	1,590	36.45%	548	12.56%	1	4,361	8.65%
9	2,485	56.32%	1,516	34.36%	406	9.20%	0	4,412	8.75%
10	1,747	51.06%	1,275	28.89%	399	11.66%	0	3,421	6.79%
11	1,556	50.71%	1,314	42.82%	186	6.06%	2	3,068	6.09%
12	558	45.36%	633	51.46%	44	3.57%	0	1,230	2.44%
13	1,610	51.29%	1,269	40.42%	260	8.28%	0	3,139	6.23%
14	1,076	37.76%	1,519	53.31%	253	8.88%	1	2,849	5.65%
15	1,633	61.00%	643	24.01%	397	14.83%	1	2,677	5.31%
16	1,615	40.55%	1,928	48.41%	458	11.50%	5	3,982	7.90%
17	1,944	54.21%	1,365	38.06%	276	7.69%	1	3,586	7.69%
Totals	24,500	48.64%	20,558	40.81%	5,297	10.52%	18	50,373	100%
