= Thomas Coman =

American politician

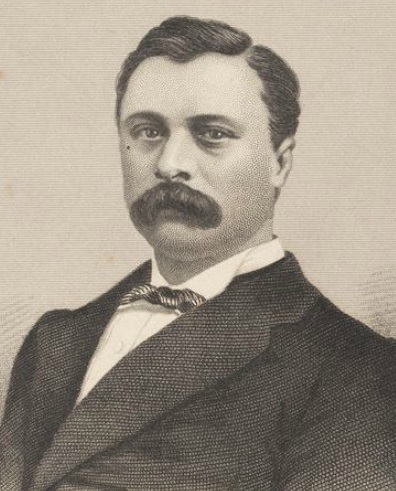
- 1869 engraving of Coman

Member of New York City Board of Aldermen
- In office 1868–1871

Acting Mayor of New York City
- In office November 30, 1868 – January 4, 1869
- Preceded by: John T. Hoffman
- Succeeded by: A. Oakey Hall

Personal details
- Born: 1836 Ireland
- Died: October 22, 1909 (aged 72–73) New York City, U.S.

Thomas Coman (August, 1836 – October 22, 1909) was President of the New York City Board of Aldermen from 1868 to 1871, and Acting Mayor of New York for several weeks at the end of 1868 and beginning of 1869.

== Biography ==
Coman was born in Ireland in August, 1836 and his family immigrated to the United States when he was two years old. They settled in New York City, and Coman was educated locally and graduated from the New York City College in 1856.

At the start of his career, Coman worked as a printer, a reporter for the New York Herald, and a clerk in the New York City Post Office.

He was later admitted to the bar, practiced law, and served as a Magistrate of the New York City Police Court.

In September 1856 Coman became a volunteer firefighter when he joined Eagle Engine Company Number 13. He was soon elected Secretary, and in 1859 won election as Foreman. He was reelected annually until 1864 and was still in command when the volunteer fire department was replaced by a paid department in 1865. During the draft riots in 1863 Coman's fire company was among the fire units that performed law enforcement duties and aided the police and military in restoring order.

A Democrat and member of the Tammany Hall organization, Coman served on the New York City Board of Aldermen from 1868 to 1871. As the board's president, he became acting mayor when John Thompson Hoffman resigned to become governor. A. Oakey Hall was elected to succeed Hoffman as mayor, and Coman served from Hoffman's resignation on December 1, 1868, until Hall's swearing-in on January 4, 1869.

After he left his alderman's seat, Mayor Hall appointed Coman one of the commissioners to oversee construction of the New York County Courthouse. In 1873 Coman and the other commissioners were indicted for conspiracy related to the Tweed Ring's corruption in the construction of the courthouse. He was also sued in civil court with one of his fellow commissioners, with the city seeking to claim city money it said they had obtained by fraud. By 1876 the criminal case had ended with a Nolle prosequi decision by the district attorney, and the civil suit had been discontinued.

Coman worked for The Equitable Life Assurance Society for more than twenty years, serving as a liaison to the city government responsible for resolving property tax disputes and code violations on company real estate, and assisting company executives in their dealings with city officials. In 1905 he testified in a New York State Legislature investigation into corruption in city government. His work for The Equitable was the subject of negative headlines, but he was not charged with any crimes.

He died in New York City on October 22, 1909. His funeral took place at Manhattan's Church of the Blessed Sacrament, which was where he was interred. (Some sources indicate the date of death as October 20. This seems to be in error, and was probably the date Coman's final illness was first reported.)

Coman was married to Martha Beechinor (d. July 19, 1920), and they were the parents of five children.

== Notes ==
Political offices
Preceded by John T. Hoffman	Mayor of New York City (acting); 1868–1869	Succeeded by A. Oakey Hall
