= Samuel B. H. Vance =

American politician (1814–1890)

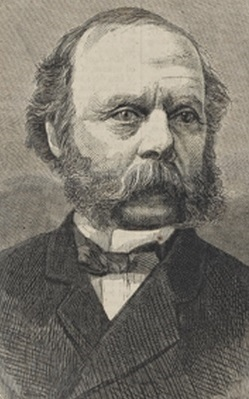

Acting Mayor of New York City
- In office November 30, 1874 – December 31, 1874
- Preceded by: William Frederick Havemeyer
- Succeeded by: William H. Wickham

Personal details
- Born: 1814 Pennsylvania
- Died: August 10, 1890 (aged 75–76) Douglaston, New York
- Party: Republican
- Spouse: Augusta Blanche Hall

Samuel B. H. Vance (1814 – August 10, 1890) was an American politician and member of the Republican Party. As president of the New York City Board of Aldermen from 1873 to 1874, he briefly became Acting Mayor of New York City between the death of the elected mayor, William Havemeyer, on November 30, 1874, and the inauguration of his elected successor, William H. Wickham, on January 1, 1875.

== Early life ==
He was born in 1814 to a distinguished family in Pennsylvania.

== Career ==
He served as a captain of volunteers in the Mexican–American War of 1846–1848. In 1854, Vance began participating in a series of firms making gas and electric lighting fixtures in New York City, twice succeeding company presidents who had died. He was elected to the New York City Board of Education in 1860, and to the Board of Aldermen in 1871 and was then chosen to be the latter's president on January 7, 1873, leading in turn to his one-month tenure as acting mayor in December 1874.

In 1885, he was one of three commissioners appointed by the New York Supreme Court to study surface transportation on lower Broadway between Union Square West and The Battery (what is now New York's Financial District). The commission recommended that, because of increased traffic and commercial density in this area, the Broadway Surface Railroad Company be granted a franchise to start and operate a horse (rather than cable) drawn line along this route. (While a horse-drawn line did start in 1885, a traction cable was installed eight years later.)

== Personal life ==
Vance was married to Augusta Blanche Hall. They lived in a mansion at 30 West 57th Street. Together, they were the parents of:

- Nannie Mitchell Vance (1860–1912), who married John Ellis Roosevelt (1853–1939) in 1879. Although Vance was a Republican, the groom's father, Robert B. Roosevelt, was a former Democratic New York City alderman and congressman (and future ambassador) who was in turn an uncle of Theodore Roosevelt, the future mayoral candidate and president.

Vance died at his home in Douglaston, Long Island, shortly after midnight on August 10, 1890, at the age of 76. His widow died in Sayville, Long Island on June 19, 1901. They are buried at Green-Wood Cemetery in Brooklyn.

=== Descendants ===
Through his daughter Nannie, Samuel Vance was the grandfather of:

- Anita Blanche "Pansy" Roosevelt (1882–1929), who reportedly was "ill from nervous prostration in a sanitarium in New York" in 1903.
- Gladys Roosevelt (1889–1926), who married Fairman Rogers Dick (1885–1976), son of Evans Rogers Dick, in 1913. Fairman's sister, Isabelle Mildred Dick (1884–1972) was married to Stuyvesant Fish Jr. (1883–1952), and stood up in the wedding of Gladys and Fairman. Gladys was killed in a horse riding accident at the Meadow Brook Hunt Club in 1926.
- Jean Schermerhorn Roosevelt (1891–1984), who married Philip James Roosevelt (1892–1941), a cousin and the son of Emlen Roosevelt, in 1925.

== In popular culture ==
His brief term was referenced in Disney+ series Daredevil: Born Again season 1 episode 2 when Commissioner Gallo confronts Mayor Wilson Fisk.

Political offices
Preceded by William Frederick Havemeyer	Mayor of New York City (acting); 1874	Succeeded by William H. Wickham
