= Robert Lurting =

Mayor of New York City

37th Mayor of New York City
- In office 1726–1735
- Preceded by: Johannes Jansen
- Succeeded by: Paul Richard

Personal details
- Born: Circa. 1650
- Died: July 3, 1735

Robert Lurting (died 3 July 1735) was the 37th Mayor of New York City from 1726 to 1735 and the first mayor of the city to die while in office.

Lurting Avenue in the Morris Park section of The Bronx is named after him.
