= John Francis Hylan =

American politician (1868–1936)

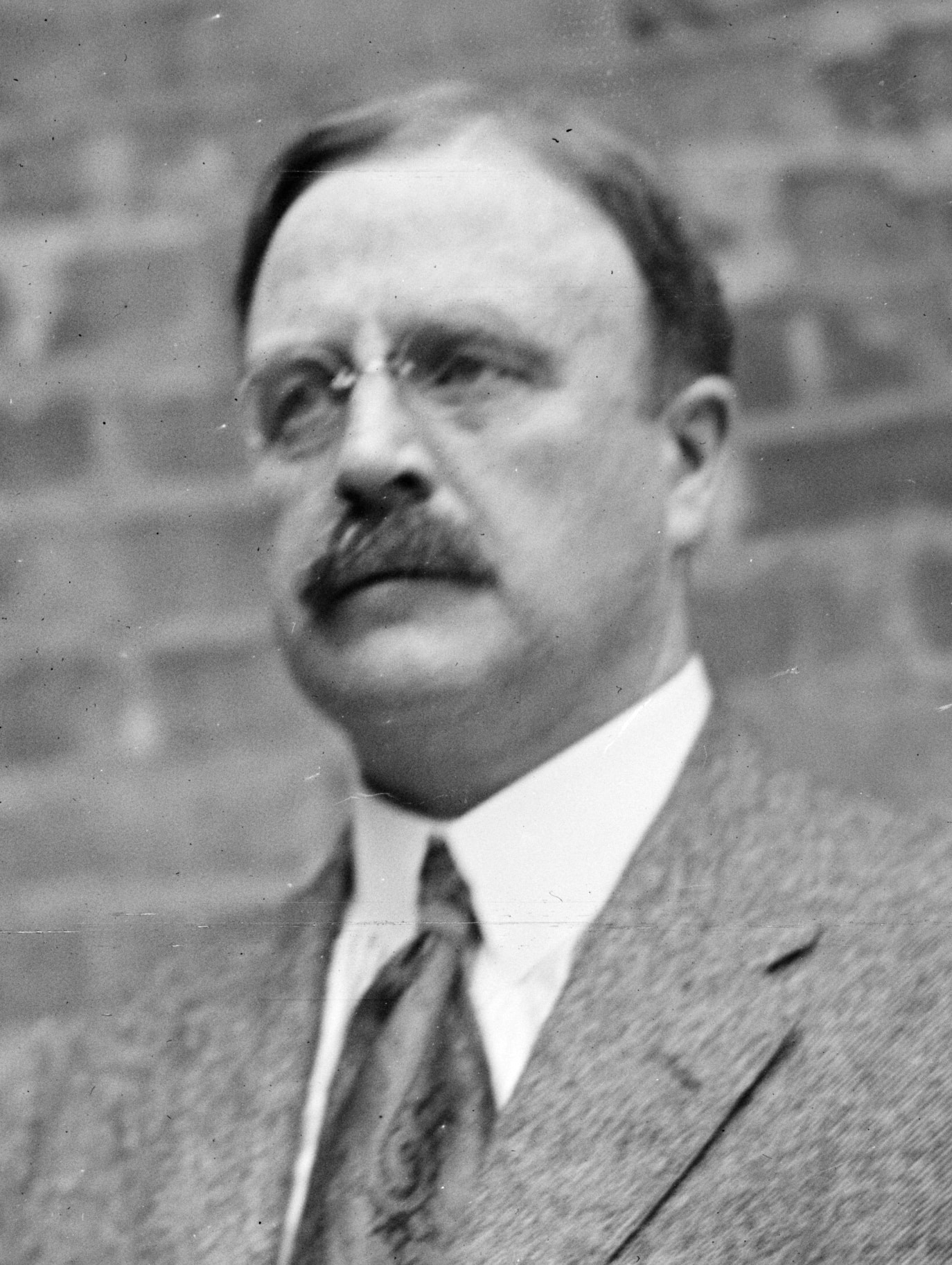
- Hylan in 1917

97th Mayor of New York City
- In office January 1, 1918 – December 30, 1925
- Preceded by: John Purroy Mitchel
- Succeeded by: James J. Walker

Personal details
- Born: April 20, 1868 Hunter, New York, U.S.
- Died: January 12, 1936 (aged 67) New York City, U.S.
- Cause of death: Heart attack
- Resting place: St. John Cemetery
- Party: Democratic
- Spouse: Marian née O'Hara Hylan
- Children: Virginia Hylan Sinnot
- Education: New York Law School (1897)

John Francis Hylan (April 20, 1868 – January 12, 1936), also known as "Red Mike" Hylan, was the 97th Mayor of New York City (the seventh since the consolidation of the five boroughs), from 1918 to 1925. From rural beginnings in the Catskills, Hylan eventually obtained work in Brooklyn as a laborer on the elevated railroad. During his nine years with the company, he worked his way to engineer, and also studied to earn his high school diploma. He continued by earning a law degree. He practiced law for nine years, and also participated in local Democratic politics.

In 1917 with the consent of Tammany and William Randolph Hearst, he was put forward as a Brooklyn Democratic candidate for Mayor and won the first of two terms. He was re-elected with a wide plurality, which swept many Brooklyn Democrats into office. His chief focus in office was to keep subway fares from rising. By the end of his second term, however, a report by a committee appointed by Governor Al Smith severely criticized his administration's handling of the subway system.

Tammany ran Jimmy Walker against him for the Democratic nomination and Hylan lost. Walker appointed him to the Children's Court where he sat for many years. After his term as mayor, Hylan spent much time attacking the "interests," arguing that industrial concentration gave great power to individuals to influence politics and impoverish the working poor.

== Early life ==
Hylan was born in 1868 in Hunter, New York. He was the third child, and had two older sisters and two younger brothers. Hylan's father had emigrated from County Cavan, Ulster, Ireland at the age of seven. He served as a corporal in the 120th New York Infantry, called the "Ulster Regiment," (Note: Also known as the "Washington Guard," the unit in August 1862 was part of the defense of Washington, D.C. The Regiment saw action at Chancellorsville and sustained heavy losses during the disastrous second day of Gettysburg, where it three times rallied around its colors during the Union withdrawal. The unit fought through the Wilderness campaign, at the Spotsylvania and all the way through until Appomattox.) during the Civil War.

Hylan's mother, who came from the Jones family upstate, had a Welsh father and a maternal grandfather, Jacob Gadron, who fought in the American Revolution among Lafayette's forces. (Note: Gadron is buried in Westchester County.) He fondly remembered her throughout his life and wrote that the words she spoke on his leaving the family ("Be honest, be truthful, be upright, and do by others as you would have them do unto you") were "indelibly imprinted on" his memory. Although his mother was Methodist, Hylan was raised a Catholic. His only surviving family, his sister Mary, died after being struck by an automobile on July 10, 1911.

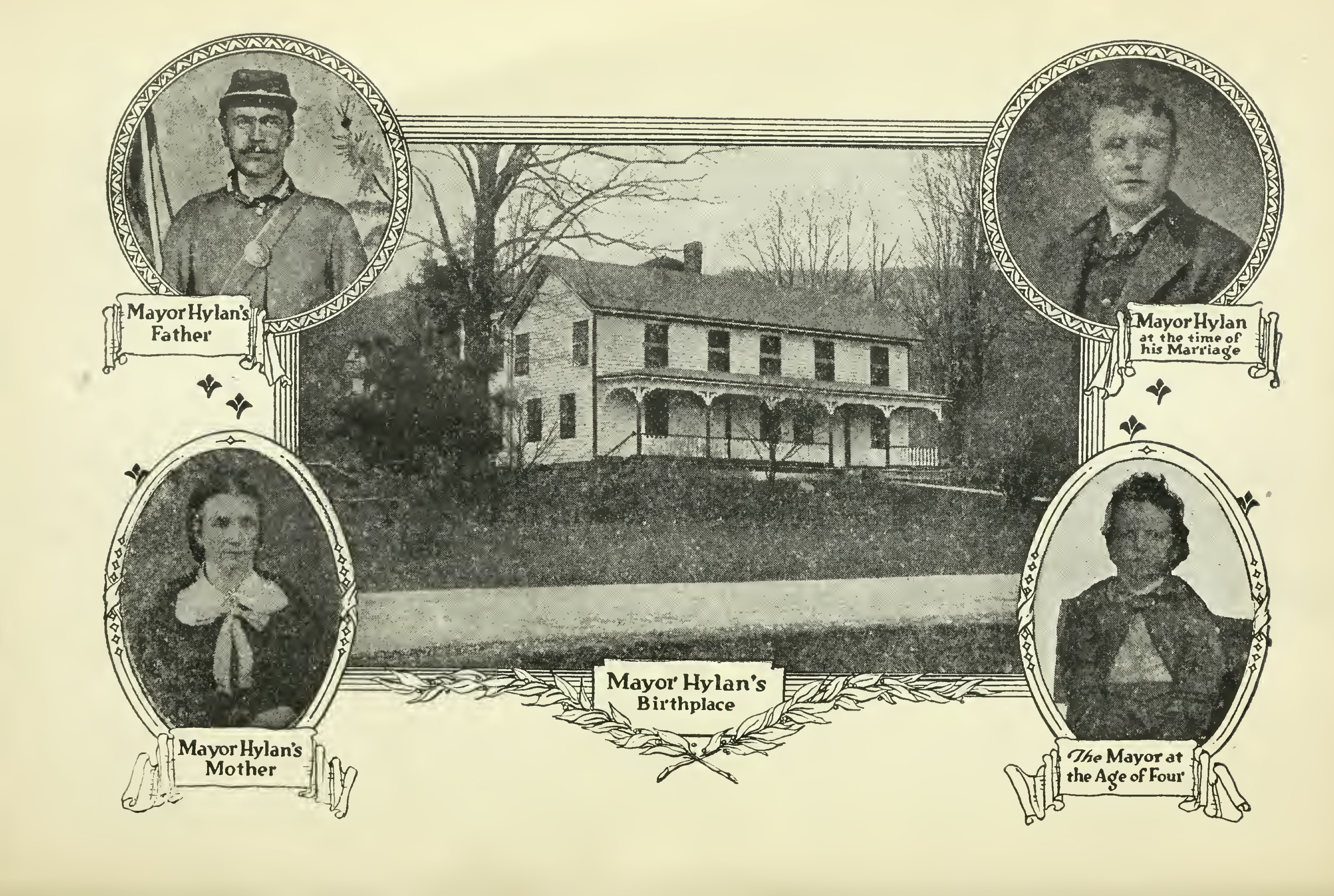
Hylan's homestead, his parents and two photos of himself as child and young man. From his autobiography.

Hylan's family owned a 60-acre farm in the then-undeveloped mountains and struggled to make the semi-annual interest on its $1,500 mortgage. As the oldest boy, Hylan was required to work long hours on the farm, which was not equipped with much more than hand tools. Farm work came first, the school district was impoverished, and only one family could afford the required grammar or history book, which Hylan occasionally borrowed. School lasted four to five hours a day for five months a year. In his teenage years, Hylan made extra money to help pay the mortgage interest by working each spring for the Catskill railroad, digging earth and tamping it beneath the tracks to stabilize them after the effects of winter weather.

== Early career ==
By the winter of 1887, when he was 19, Hylan felt he could make more money for his parents by working downstate. With $3.50 and a few sets of clothes, he set off to New York, buying a $2 train ticket and then crossing the Brooklyn Bridge. On his first day he saw construction on an elevated railroad. Although he had never seen such a thing before, he climbed onto the structure and asked the foreman for a job, saying that he had worked on the Catskill railroad. He was told to report the next day, where his job was to lay rails.

Seeking a promotion, he applied at the office of the manager of the Brooklyn Union Elevated Railroad each day until he was finally granted an interview and promoted to fireman. He made $1.50 a day for this heavy labor. He reported to the East New York station on March 11, 1888, the day of the Great Blizzard. After two years as stoker, then as engine hostler, Hylan passed the required test and was given a job as an engineer, in "one of the happiest moments of [his] life." Making $3.50 a day, he said, "finally landed [him] on the right side of the engine cab." It required long hours: 13-hour runs on weekdays, 12 hours on Saturdays, and 11 on Sundays.

When Hylan felt himself economically secure, even before he became engineer, he went back to Hunter and married his childhood sweetheart Marian O'Hara. They moved to Bushwick, a section of Brooklyn where they would spend most of the rest of their lives. During his years as a motorman, he regularly paid the $75 semiannual interest payment for his family's farm and paid the principal off before he left that job. Hylan wrote that he had no inclination to seek any other position once he was settled and making $100 a month.

Hylan considered law because his younger brother, who had been studying law and on whom his parents had pinned hopes and family pride, had died. His wife encouraged him, but because of his limited education, he had to study at the Long Island Business College to prepare himself for his Regents exam before he could begin to study law. He got into law school with the help of his wife, as well as that of a teacher who gave up his lunch hour to help, and for whom Hylan later found a position in the Department of Water Supply, Gas and Electricity when he became mayor.

After he passed his Regents exam, he enrolled in New York Law School where Woodrow Wilson, who was teaching Constitutional Law there at the time, was among his professors. After graduating in October 1897, Hylan clerked for Long Island City attorney James T. Olwell. He prepared himself in two and a half years. The earliest bar exam he could take was in Syracuse, but immediately before he was set to take the exam, he was involved in a near accident with the railroad's supervisor. Hylan said that it was the supervisor's fault, but nonetheless, he was fired. Even so, the privileges of his membership in the Brotherhood of Locomotive Engineers enabled him to travel to Syracuse at no charge, and he passed the bar exam.

== Law and politics ==
=== Law career ===
Hylan learned that law practices required startup cash, so he mortgaged the farm again to raise $500. With that sum, he set up an office on the corner of Gates Avenue and Broadway in Bushwick. He made $24 his first month, but gradually built up a good civil litigation practice. He soon formed a partnership with Harry C. Underhill, an attorney who had written a treatise on evidence and would go on to write on other practice topics. Underhill did the office work, while Hylan was the trial lawyer. The firm occasionally received positive local publicity, such as the time when they obtained a ruling that the Brooklyn Heights Railroad Company had to offer free transfers at all junctions. (Note: The company had operated under a series of leases to other companies. It argued that the junctions of two different companies was outside the requirement of Section 104 of the New York Railroad Law requiring that a railroad charge only one fare for a continuous trip within a city. Justice Thomas H. Williams of the Municipal Court held otherwise. The decision was considered so important to Brooklyn residents that the Brooklyn Board of Trade resolved to support the fees of Hylan & Underhilll to defend the decision on appeal by seeking subscriptions in the name of the Board.) Hylan litigated small civil cases and family law matters. He had little work in the police courts and "never cared for that branch of the law."

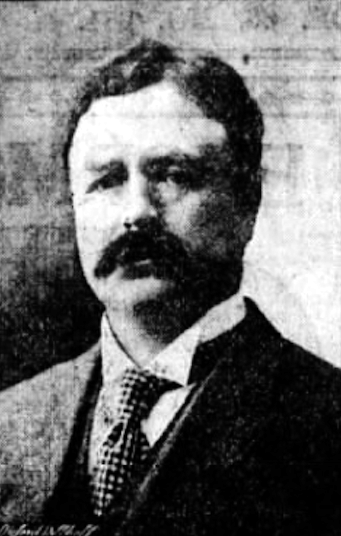
John F. Hylan in 1905

After eight years in the courts of Brooklyn, he was respected enough to begin getting appointments within the power of local judges. Hylan had higher ambitions, so he began making the kind of connections expected of someone considering a run for higher office. One connection he made, albeit by accident, was John H. McCooey, the future Brooklyn Democratic Party boss; they met when McCooey was a postal clerk and Hylan was sending money orders to his parents for interest payments on the family farm's mortgage. Hylan would remain grateful for the kindness McCooey showed him, and they remained friends thereafter.

Other contacts were made by constant attendance at local organizations, political and otherwise. In addition to his union membership, which he kept up even when he was mayor, he was a member of the Foresters of America, the Broadway Board of Trade, the Twenty-eighth Ward Taxpayer Association, and he began working his way up the local Democratic club.

=== Politics and judgeships ===
In 1906, Hylan discovered that machinations surrounding a state law regarding the appointment of magistrates that was intended to result in the appointment of 10 to assist the judges of the Kings County Court had resulted in the appointment of eight; he successfully sought appointment to one of the two vacancies. When the magistrate's positions became elected, State Senator Patrick H. McCarren, the leader of Brooklyn's Democratic Party, repaid a political debt to Hylan by supporting him in the election, which he won.

Hylan was appointed to the Kings County Court by Governor Martin H. Glynn in 1914 and he was later elected to a full term. He remained on the court until 1917, when he was elected mayor.

=== Mayor of New York City ===
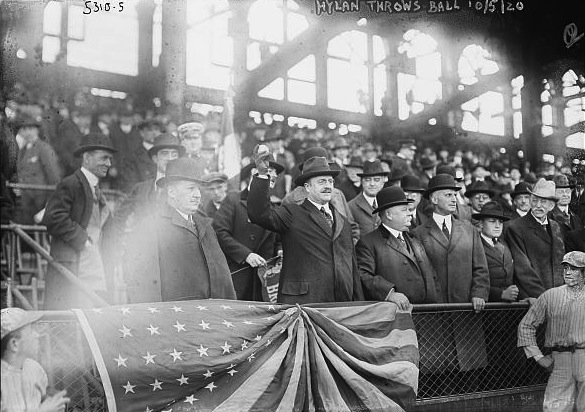
Hylan attending the 1920 World Series at Ebbets Field.

Hylan defeated the reformer John Purroy Mitchel in the four-sided 1917 mayoral election, restoring the power of Tammany at City Hall. Hylan was the first Democratic candidate to obtain a significant portion of the African American voter base. He easily won re-election in 1921 but was defeated for re-nomination in 1925 by State Senator James J. "Jimmy" Walker. Walker later appointed Hylan to the municipal judiciary.

As mayor, Hylan railed against "the interests" and put in motion the building of the Independent Subway System, which would later become part of the New York City Subway. On December 30, 1925, Hylan resigned from office one day before the end of his term in order to assure his eligibility for a $4,205 annual pension from the city. The 14-mile (23 km) Hylan Boulevard in Staten Island was renamed for him in 1923 over the protests of his political opponents.

Hylan developed a reputation for not being exceptionally intelligent or well-spoken. According to Robert Moses, Hylan went through most of a mayoral campaign using just one stump speech: a call to keep the five-cent subway fare in place. He asked for Moses' help in preparing another, and Moses obliged. The first time Hylan tried to deliver the new speech, he reached the climax—a Revolutionary War-inspired "I call for the spirit of 1776"—but rather than closing out on a high note, Hylan missed the context and read out the number's digits, saying, "I call for the spirit of one-seven-seven-six."

In another story recounted about Hylan's supposed lack of intelligence and articulateness, his successor Jimmy Walker appointed Hylan as judge of the Queens Children's Court. When journalist Alva Johnston asked Walker why he would appoint a rival to a judgeship, Walker quipped, "The children now can be tried by their peer."

==== Famous speech ====
Hylan's most famous statement against "the interests" was the following speech, made in 1922, while he was the sitting Mayor of New York City:

The real menace of our Republic is the invisible government, which like a giant octopus sprawls its slimy legs over our cities, states and nation. To depart from mere generalizations, let me say that at the head of this octopus are the Rockefeller–Standard Oil interests and a small group of powerful banking houses generally referred to as the international bankers. The little coterie of powerful international bankers virtually run the United States government for their own selfish purposes.

They practically control both parties, write political platforms, make catspaws of party leaders, use the leading men of private organizations, and resort to every device to place in nomination for high public office only such candidates as will be amenable to the dictates of corrupt big business.

These international bankers and Rockefeller–Standard Oil interests control the majority of the newspapers and magazines in this country. They use the columns of these papers to club into submission or drive out of office public officials who refuse to do the bidding of the powerful corrupt cliques which compose the invisible government. It operates under cover of a self-created screen [and] seizes our executive officers, legislative bodies, schools, courts, newspapers and every agency created for the public protection.

== Death ==
Hylan died of a heart attack at the age of 67 on January 12, 1936, at his home in Forest Hills, Queens.

== See also ==
- List of mayors of New York City
- Abridged recording of Mayor Hylan reading his acceptance speech on renomination as Mayor in 1921 for the General Phonograph Corporation.

== Sources ==
- Carmer, Carl (1948). "From Van Wyck to O'Dwyer". In Nevins, Allan; Krout, John A. (eds.). The Greater City: New York, 1898-1948. New York: Columbia University Press. LCCN 48008678.
- Hylan, John Francis (1922). The Autobiography of John Francis Hylan: Mayor of New York. New York: Rotary Press. LCCN 22015052.

=== Further reading ===
- Browne, Porter Emerson (1917). Political Primer. New York City: Public Welfare Committee. LCCN 95125617.
- Holli, Melvin G; Jones, Peter d'A., eds. (1981). Biographical Dictionary of American Mayors, 1820-1980. Westport, Connecticut: Greenwood Press. ISBN 0313211345.
- Hylan, John Francis (1932). Gold, its Control over Nations and Men. New York: Prosperity Publishing Co. LCCN 32020955.
- Slayton, Robert A. (2001). Empire Statesman: The Rise and Redemption of Al Smith. New York: Free Press. ISBN 0684863022.

Political offices
Preceded by John Purroy Mitchel	Mayor of New York City; 1918–1925	Succeeded by James J. Walker
