= Johannes Jansen (mayor) =

American politician

36th Mayor of New York City
- In office 1725–1726
- Preceded by: Robert Walters
- Succeeded by: Robert Lurting

Personal details
- Born: April 18, 1665 New Amsterdam
- Died: September 11, 1734 (aged 69) New York City
- Spouse(s): Susanna Simons Fell; Johanna Luursen

Johannes Jansen (1665–1734) was the 36th Mayor of New York City from 1725 to 1726.

== Career ==
Johannes Janszen, thus spelt, appears in the 1703 census of New York, in a household with one woman and four children, two boys and two girls. He may also be the same man as Johannes Janszen Van Rommen.

Jansen was elected a member of the New York General Assembly, representing New York, serving from 1709 to 1711 and 1716 to 1726.

Jansen also served as the 36th Mayor of New York City from 1725 to 1726.
