= Jimmy Walker =

Mayor of New York City from 1926 to 1932

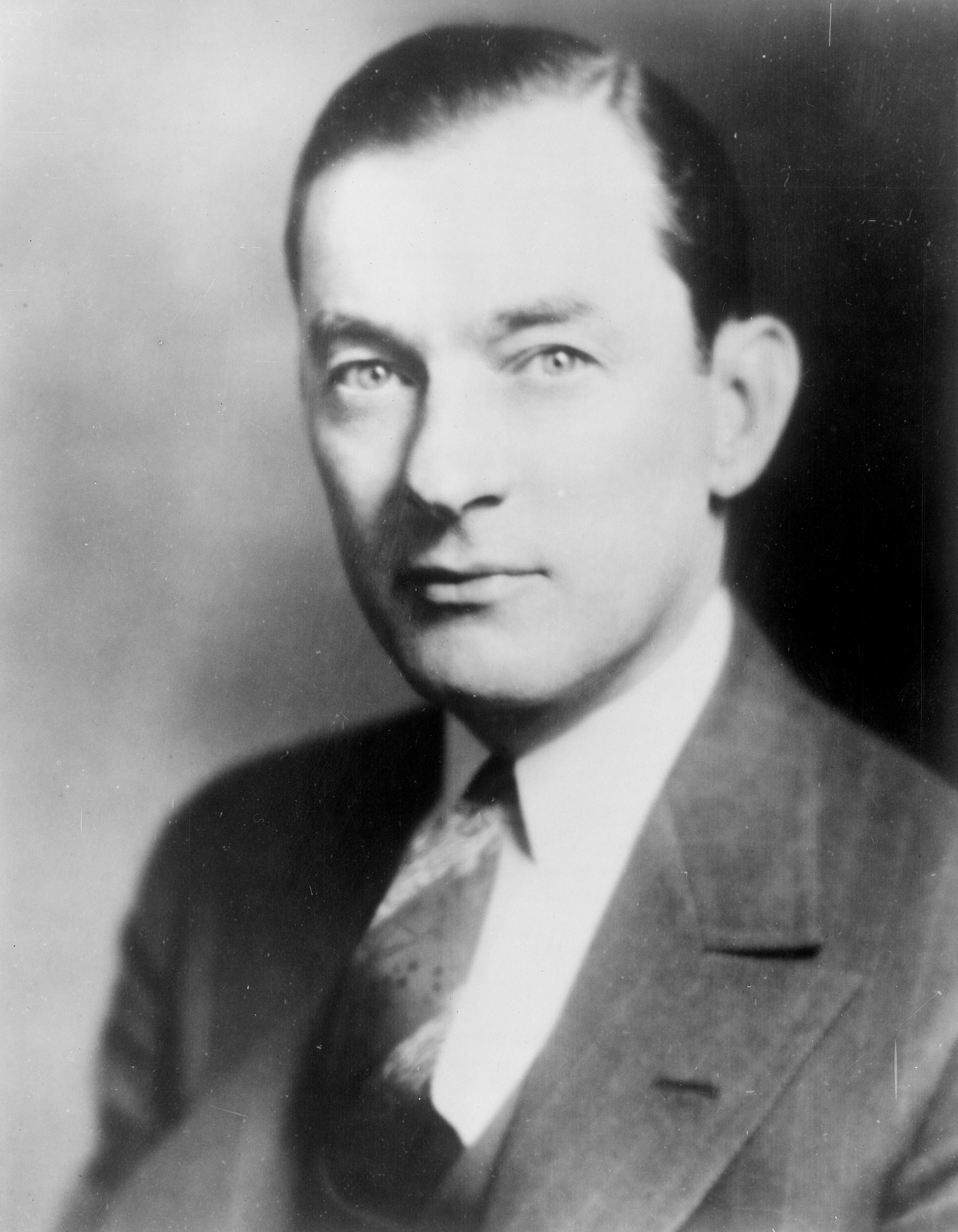
- Portrait by Eugene de Salignac, 1932

98th Mayor of New York City
- In office January 1, 1926 – September 1, 1932
- Preceded by: John F. Hylan
- Succeeded by: Joseph V. McKee (acting)

Member of the New York Senate
- In office January 1, 1915 – December 31, 1925
- Preceded by: James D. McClelland
- Succeeded by: Elmer F. Quinn
- Constituency: 13th district (1915–18); 12th district (1919–25)

Member of the New York State Assembly from the 5th New York County district
- In office January 1, 1910 – December 31, 1914
- Preceded by: John T. Eagleton
- Succeeded by: Maurice McDonald

Personal details
- Born: James John Walker; June 19, 1881 New York City, U.S.
- Died: November 18, 1946 (aged 65) New York City, U.S.
- Party: Democratic
- Spouses: Janet Walker (m. 1912; div. 1932) Betty Compton (m. 1933; div. 1941)
- Children: 2
- Relatives: William H. Walker (father)

James John Walker (June 19, 1881 – November 18, 1946), known colloquially as Jimmy Walker and Beau James, was an American attorney, lyricist, and Democratic Party politician who served as the 98th mayor of New York City from 1926 until his resignation in 1932. A flamboyant politician, he was a liberal Democrat and part of the powerful Tammany Hall machine. He was forced to resign during a corruption scandal in which he accepted large sums of money in exchange for municipal contracts.

== Early life and political career ==
Walker was the son of Irish-born William H. Walker (1842–1916), a carpenter and lumberyard owner who was very active in local politics as a Democratic assemblyman and alderman from Greenwich Village, belying certain accounts of Walker's childhood that stated he grew up in poverty. Walker was not the best student and dropped out of college, eventually graduating from New York Law School in 1904. Walker's father wanted him to become a lawyer and politician, but he decided that he would rather write songs and be involved in the music industry. He wrote the lyrics for a 1906 hit, "Will You Love Me in December as You Do in May?" with songwriter Ernest Ball. Walker entered politics in 1909 and subsequently passed the bar exam in 1912.

Walker was a member of the New York State Assembly (New York Co., 5th D.) in 1910, 1911, 1912, 1913 and 1914. He was a member of the New York State Senate from 1915 to 1925, sitting in the 138th, 139th, 140th, 141st (all four 13th D.), 142nd, 143rd, 144th, 145th, 146th, 147th and 148th New York State Legislatures (all seven 12th D.); and was Minority Leader from 1920 to 1922; Temporary President of the State Senate from 1923 to 1924; and Minority Leader again in 1925. In the Senate he strongly opposed Prohibition.

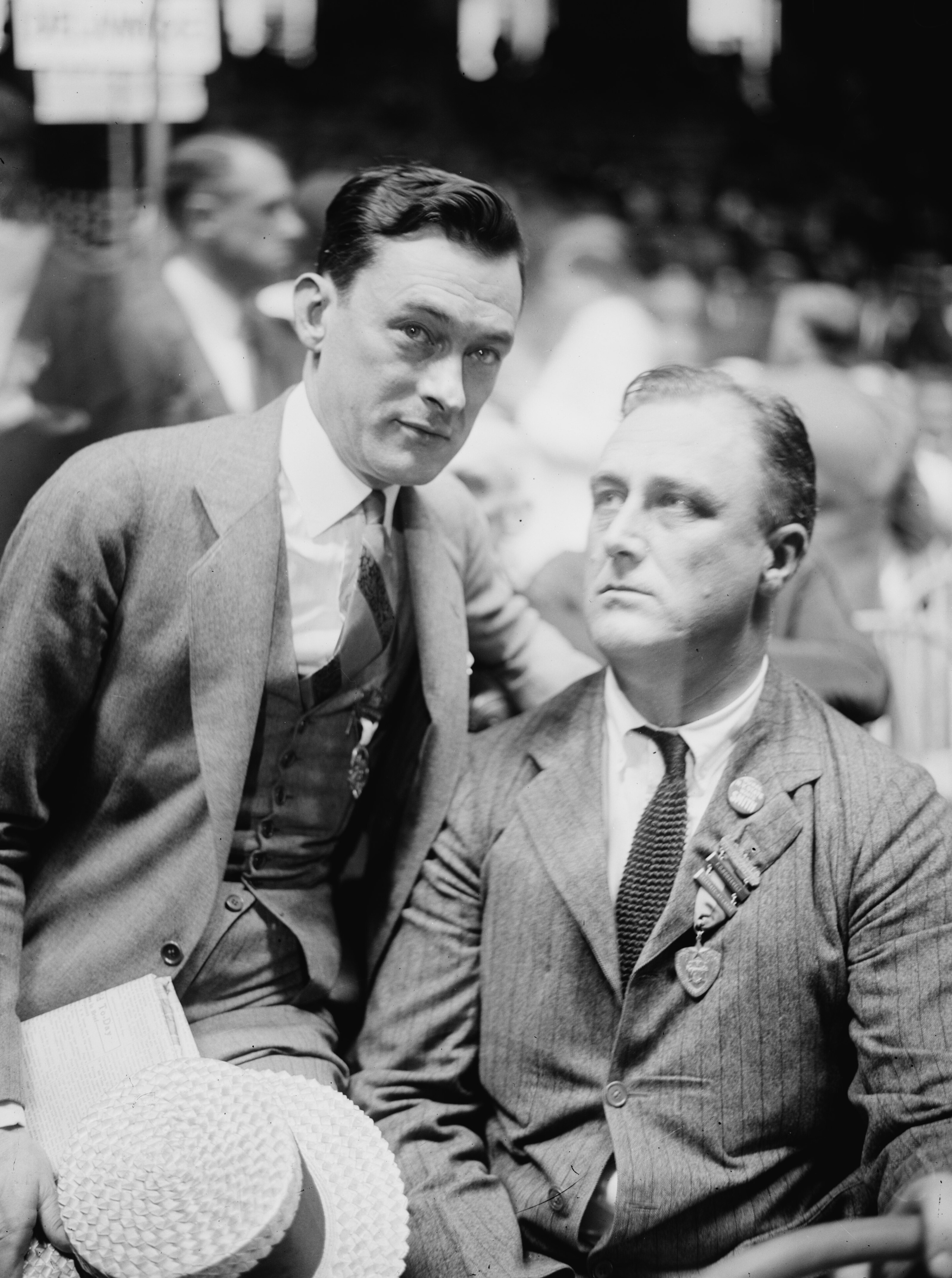
Walker and future President Franklin D. Roosevelt supported Al Smith at the 1924 Democratic National Convention, but later split politically.

During his tenure as Temporary President of the State Senate, Walker was often seen on the floor accompanied by reformist activist, future urban planner, and key Al Smith ally Robert Moses. Moses, without an official position and therefore forced to kneel beside Walker's desk rather than sit in a chair, acted sort of as an advisor for Walker. He provided Walker with arguments and facts to be used against Republican adversaries on issues that, according to author Robert Caro, "Walker had no patience to master." Moses also delivered messages to Walker on Governor Smith's behalf.

Walker was elegant and witty, but he was also willing to take down his opponents with no mercy. Ellwood Rabenold was a reformist elected to the State Senate as a Democrat. He was independent-minded and put the party's one-vote majority in 1923 in jeopardy. When Rabenold refused to support a bill that Democrats considered vital and then attacked Walker's character, Walker pledged he would "ruin" Rabenold and dedicated the rest of the term to forcing Rabenold out of politics. Walker would eventually succeed, showing no remorse for destroying his career.

== Running for mayor, 1925 ==
After his years in the Senate, Walker set his sights on the 1925 election for Mayor of New York. Beginning with the 1925 Democratic primary for mayor, Walker knew that to ultimately win the mayoral election he had to defeat the mayor, John Francis Hylan. Walker's reputation as a flamboyant man-about-town made him a hero to many working-class voters; he was often seen at legitimate theaters and illegitimate speakeasies. Walker was a clothes horse: his valet packed 43 suits for his trip to Europe in August 1927. On the other hand, his reputation for tolerating corruption made him suspect to middle-class and moralistic voters. Governor Alfred E. Smith was his mentor. Smith was a staunch supporter since Walker backed many social and cultural issues that were considered politically important, such as social welfare legislation, legalization of boxing, repeal of blue laws against Sunday baseball games, and condemning the Ku Klux Klan. Their mutual opposition to Prohibition was especially important in their political relationship.

Smith knew the secret to how Walker could win the mayoral race and overcome his tarnished reputation was for Smith to guide Walker's every move. Smith used his base in the strong political machine of Tammany Hall to secure victory. Finally, Walker himself had to be willing to change some of his more unscrupulous ways or at least provide a cover for his indiscretions. As with many things in Walker's life, he chose the latter. Instead of ending his visits to speakeasies and his friendships with chorus girls, he took those activities behind the closed doors of a penthouse funded by Tammany Hall.

Walker defeated Hylan in the Democratic primary, and after defeating Republican mayoral candidate Frank D. Waterman in the general election he became mayor of New York.

== Mayor, 1926–1932 ==
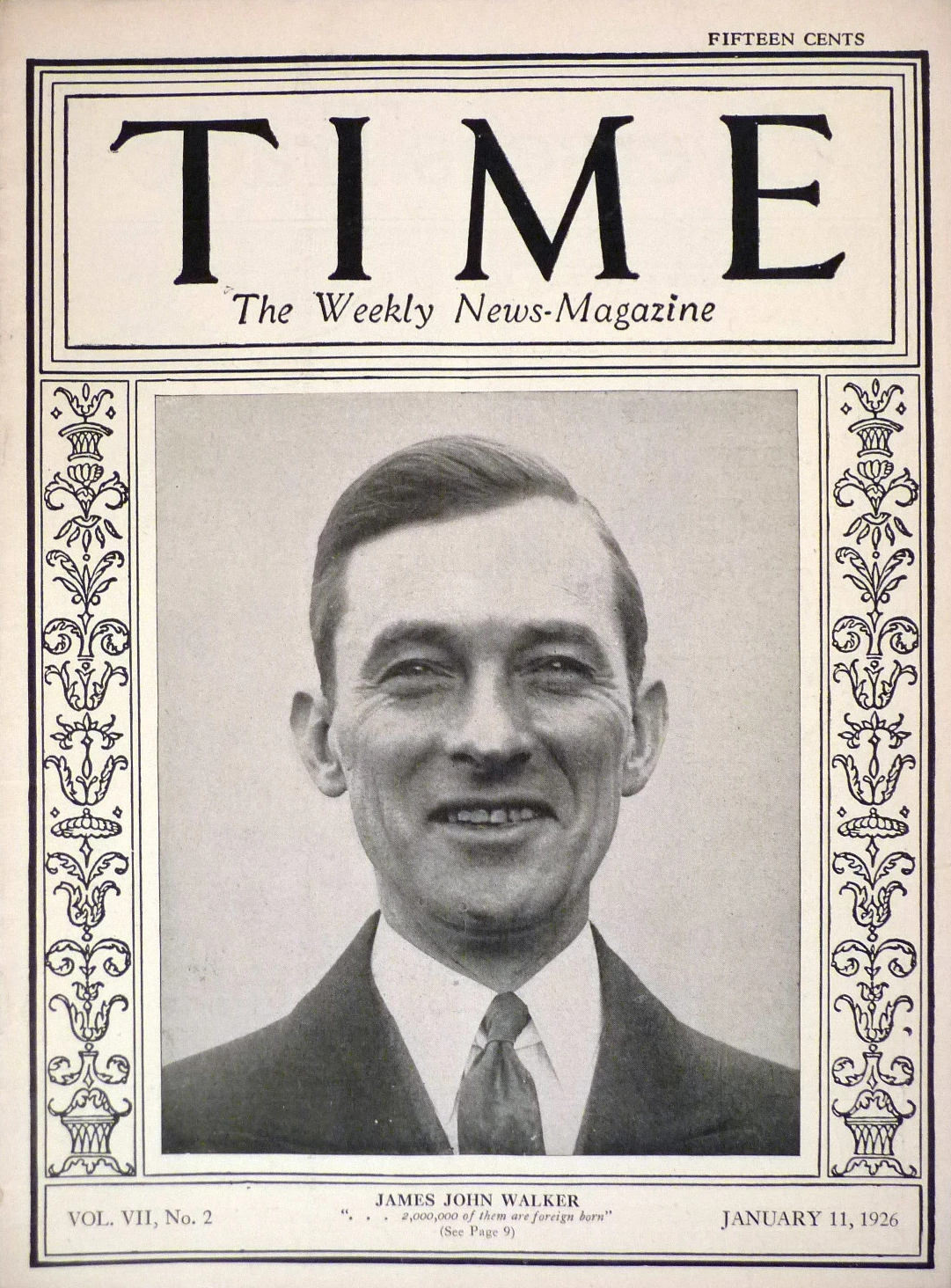
Walker on the cover of Time magazine, January 11, 1926

In his initial years as mayor, Walker saw the city prosper and many public works projects gain traction. In his first year, Walker created the Department of Sanitation, unified New York's public hospitals, improved many parks and playgrounds, and guided the Board of Transportation to enter into contract for the construction of an expanded subway system (the Independent Subway System or IND). Under Walker's administration, new highways and a dock for superliners were also built. He even managed to maintain the five-cent subway fare despite a threatened strike by the workers.

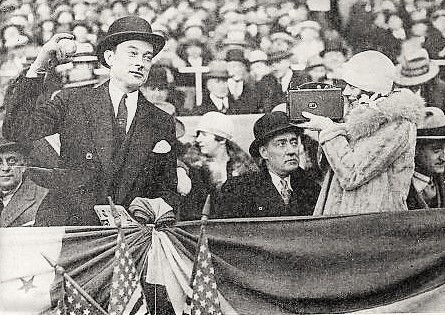
Walker throwing a ceremonial first pitch at a baseball game, c. 1929

Walker's term was also known for the proliferation of speakeasies during Prohibition. It is a noted aspect of his career as mayor and as a member of the State Senate that Walker was strongly opposed to Prohibition. As mayor, Walker led his administration in challenging the Eighteenth Amendment by replacing the police commissioner with an inexperienced former state banking commissioner. The new police commissioner immediately dissolved the Special Service Squad. Since Walker did not feel that drinking was a crime, he discouraged the police from enforcing Prohibition law or taking an active role unless it was to curb excessive violations or would prove to be newsworthy. His affairs with "chorus girls" were widely known, and he left his wife, Janet, for showgirl Betty Compton. The first U.S. arrival in New York City of the best known Anastasia Romanov impostor, Anna Anderson, in 1928 and the eventual public denial of her by the exiled Romanovs and return to Germany in 1931 also occurred during Walker's mayoralty.

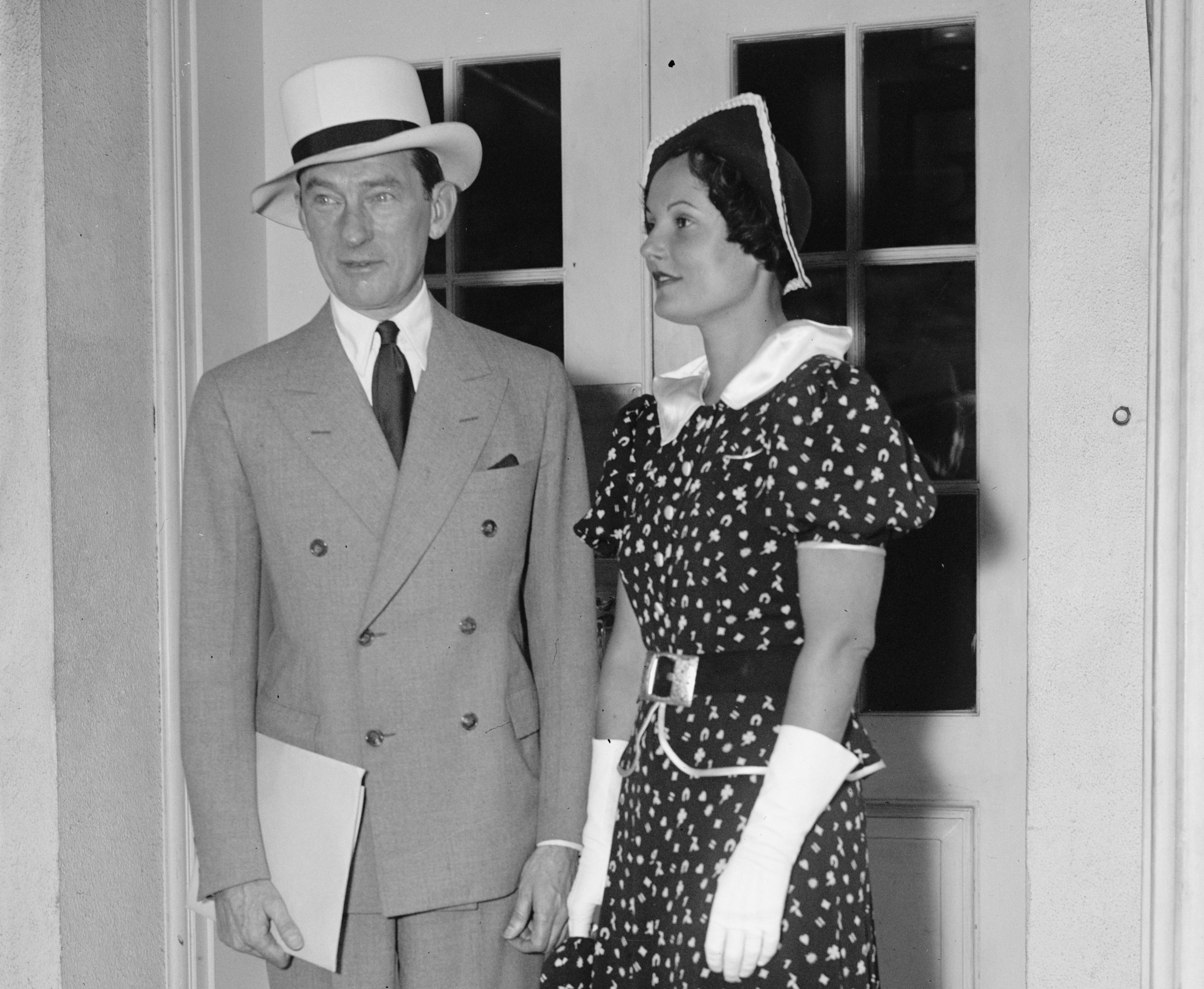
Walker and his second wife, Betty Compton, at the White House in 1937

Walker was re-elected by an overwhelming margin in 1929, defeating Republican Fiorello H. La Guardia and Socialist Norman Thomas. Walker's fortunes turned downward with the economy after the stock-market crash of 1929. Patrick Joseph Hayes, the Cardinal Archbishop of New York, denounced him, implying that the immorality of the mayor, both personal and political in tolerating "girlie magazines" and casinos, was a cause of the economic downturn. It was one of the causes that led to Tammany Hall's pulling its support for Walker. Walker's image was further solidified by quotes like "A reformer is a guy who rides through a sewer in a glass-bottomed boat."

Walker endorsed Al Smith for the Democratic nomination during the 1932 presidential election.

== Scandal and resignation ==
Increasing social unrest led to investigations into corruption within Walker's administration, and he was eventually forced to testify before the investigative committee of Judge Samuel Seabury, the Seabury Commission (also known as the Hofstadter Committee). Walker caused his own downfall by accepting large sums of money from businessmen looking for municipal contracts.

One surprise witness in the Seabury investigation was Vivian Gordon. She informed the investigators that women were falsely arrested and accused of prostitution by the New York City Police Department. Police officers were given more money in their paychecks. After her testimony, Gordon was suspiciously found strangled in a park in the Bronx. The incident demonstrated to New Yorkers that corruption could lead to terrible consequences, and led to suspicion that Walker might ultimately, in some way, have been responsible for her death.

With New York City appearing as a symbol of corruption under Mayor Walker, Governor Franklin D. Roosevelt knew he had to do something about Walker and his administration. Knowing that the state constitution could allow an elected mayor to be removed from office, Roosevelt felt compelled to do so but risked losing Tammany Hall's support for the Democratic nomination for president. On the other hand, if Roosevelt did nothing or let Walker off, the national newspapers would consider him weak.

Facing pressure from Roosevelt, Walker eluded questions about his personal bank accounts, stating instead that the amounts he received were "beneficences" and not bribes. He delayed any personal appearances until after Roosevelt's nomination was secured. It was then that the embattled mayor could fight no longer. Months from his national election, Roosevelt decided that he must remove Walker from office. Walker agreed and resigned on September 1, 1932.

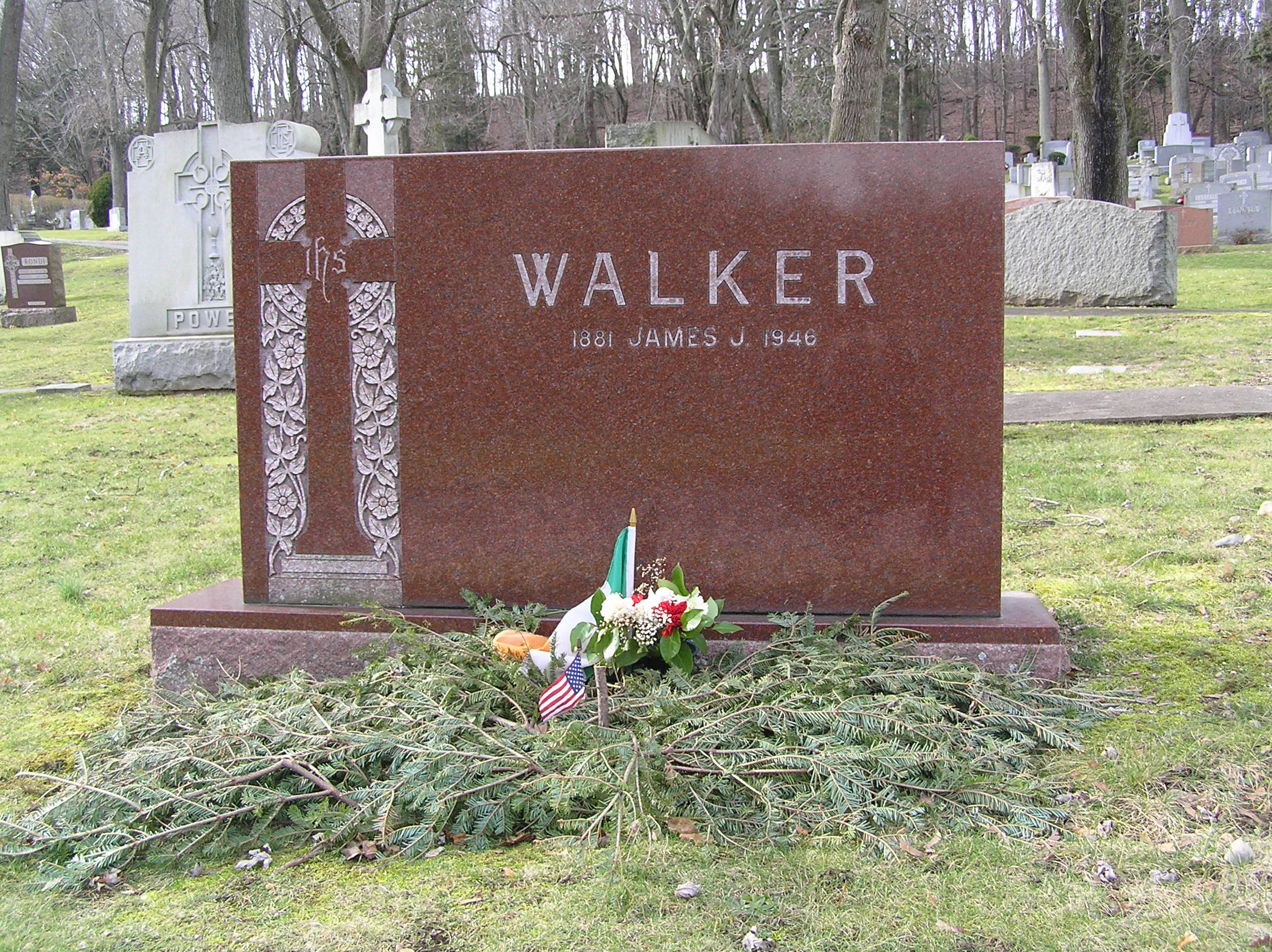
The grave of Jimmy Walker in Gate of Heaven Cemetery

== Later life and legacy ==
Walker went on a grand tour of Europe with Compton, his Ziegfeld girl. He announced on November 12, 1932, while aboard the SS Conte Grande, that he had "no desire or intention of ever holding public office again." Walker stayed in Europe until the danger of criminal prosecution appeared remote. There, he married Compton while in Cannes, France.

After his return to the United States, Walker acted as head of Majestic Records, which included such popular performing artists as Louis Prima and Bud Freeman. He and Compton would adopt two children, Mary Ann Walker and James J. Walker. In 1940 he had his own radio series on WHN, Jimmy Walker's Opportunity Hour, with Henry Gladstone serving as announcer. The same year, Compton began divorce action against Walker, with the divorce becoming official on March 15, 1941. He died on November 18, 1946, at the age of 65 of a brain hemorrhage. He was interred in the Gate of Heaven Cemetery in Hawthorne, New York.

When Walker was a member of the New York State Senate, he sponsored the "Walker Law" to legalize boxing in New York. He was honored a number of times over the years by the boxing community. Walker is a member of the International Boxing Hall of Fame and was given the Edward J. Neil Trophy in 1945 for his service to the sport.

He also spent many summers in Atlantic Beach, New York, sometimes during his term as mayor, and afterward, for he was friends with its founder, William Austin.

A 1985 survey of historians, political scientists and urban experts conducted by Melvin G. Holli of the University of Illinois at Chicago ranked Walker as the fourth-worst American big-city mayor to have been in office since 1820. A 1993 edition of the same survey saw Walker similarly ranked as the third-worst.

== In popular culture ==
A romanticized version of Walker's tenure as mayor was presented in the 1957 film Beau James, starring Bob Hope. This was a somewhat accurate depiction of Walker, who during his time as mayor had become a symbol of the jazz age romanticism. The film was based on a biography of Walker, also titled Beau James, written by Gene Fowler. A song by Dean Martin, similarly titled "Beau James", presented a highly idealized and romantic interpretation of his tenure as mayor. A book was also the basis of Jimmy, a stage musical about Walker that had a brief Broadway run from October 1969 to January 1970. The show starred Frank Gorshin as Walker and Anita Gillette as Betty Compton. There is also a song about Walker in the stage musical Fiorello!, "Gentleman Jimmy".

== See also ==
- List of mayors of New York City
- List of covers of Time magazine (1920s) – January 11, 1926, May 20, 1929.
- New York City mayoral elections

== Works cited ==
- Kessner, Thomas (1989). Fiorello H. LaGuardia and the Making of Modern New York. McGraw Hill Education. ISBN 0-07-034244-X.

New York State Assembly
Preceded by John T. Eagleton	New York State Assembly; New York County, 5th District; 1910–1914	Succeeded by Maurice McDonald
New York State Senate
Preceded by James D. McClelland	New York State Senate; 13th District; 1915–1918	Succeeded by John J. Boylan
Preceded by Jacob Koenig	New York State Senate; 12th District; 1919–1925	Succeeded by Elmer F. Quinn
Political offices
Preceded by James A. Foley	Minority Leader in the New York State Senate; 1920–1922	Succeeded by Clayton R. Lusk
Preceded by Clayton R. Lusk	President pro tempore of the New York State Senate; 1923–1924	Succeeded by John Knight
Preceded by Clayton R. Lusk	Minority Leader in the New York State Senate; 1925	Succeeded by Bernard Downing
Preceded by John F. Hylan	Mayor of New York City; 1926–1932	Succeeded by Joseph V. McKee
