= Paul Richard =

Mayor of New York City

38th Mayor of New York City
- In office 1735–1739
- Preceded by: Robert Lurting
- Succeeded by: John Cruger

Personal details
- Born: 1697 New York City, New York
- Died: 1756 (aged 58–59)

Paul Richard (1697–1756) was the 38th Mayor of New York City from 1735 to 1739. Paul Richard was one of the most prominent merchants and citizens of New York, and Mayor of the City in 1735–1739. His remains were buried in Trinity Church under the chancel, which in the ancient edifice was at the east end of the building. In digging for the foundations of the present church, in 1839, the broken fragments of the tombstone of Paul Richard were discovered. He was also a Governor of Kings College, now Columbia University, and was elected to the General Assembly.
