= William H. Wickham =

American politician (1832–1893)

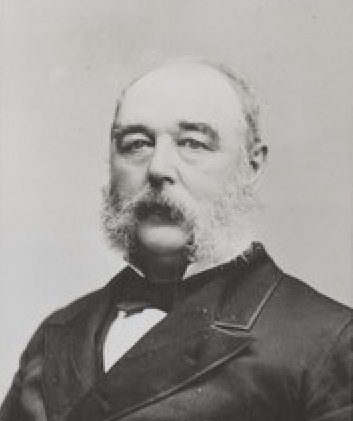

82nd Mayor of New York City
- In office January 1, 1875 – December 31, 1876
- Preceded by: Samuel B. H. Vance (acting)
- Succeeded by: Smith Ely Jr.

Personal details
- Born: July 30, 1832 Smithtown, New York, U.S.
- Died: January 13, 1893 (aged 60) New York City, U.S.
- Party: Democratic
- Spouse: Louise Floyd
- Children: 1

William Hull Wickham (July 30, 1832 – January 13, 1893) was the 82nd Mayor of New York City and an anti-Ring Democrat who helped to topple corrupt politician Boss Tweed.

== Early life ==
Wickham was born in Smithtown on Long Island, but was raised in New York. He was the son of Daniel H. and Ruth Wickham, who lived at 71 West 11th Street in modern day Greenwich Village, Manhattan.

He was a distant cousin of John Wickham, the attorney for Aaron Burr during his trial for treason. It was Burr who transformed Tammany into a political machine for the election of 1800.

== Career ==
Early in his career, he worked for the Pacific Mail Steamship Company and was a volunteer fireman. Wickham joined Mutual Hook and Ladder Company No. 1 in 1850 and served as foreman. In 1854, he organized the Baxter Hook and Ladder Company No. 15. He was elected Secretary of the New York Fire Department in 1858, Vice President in 1859, and President from 1860 until 1861.

=== Political career ===
In the early 1870s, Wickham became an anti-Ring Democrat opposed to Boss Tweed of Tammany Hall. Wickham served as Chairman of the Apollo Hall Democracy, a political group that worked to bring Boss Tweed to justice. He also served on the Executive Committee of Seventy, a group formed by the public to reestablish honest government.

In 1874, Wickham was nominated by the Democrats to be Mayor of New York, with the support of a temporarily reformed Tammany Hall. He easily defeated Oswald Ottendorfer, the Independent Democratic candidate, and Salem Howe Wales, the Republican. During his two-year tenure starting in 1875, Wickham appointed William C. Whitney to be the City of New York's legal counsel to combat political fraud. Wickham also conducted fundraising for the pedestal of the Statue of Liberty.

Wickham declined to be re-nominated in 1876. He served on the Board of Education for several years and was a member of the Committee of One Hundred for New York's Columbian celebration.

== Personal life ==
He was married to Louise Shepard Floyd. Together, they were the parents of a daughter:

- Louise Floyd Wickham (1858–1933), who did not marry and who attended Miss Porter's School in Farmington, Connecticut.

After the death of his sister, he adopted her three grown children, one son and two daughters, as his own, and they all lived together at his home.

He died at his home, 338 Lexington Avenue, in New York City on January 13, 1893, from heart disease along with his ailment of Bright's Disease.

=== Legacy ===
A street in the North Bronx is named after Wickham.

Political offices
Preceded by Samuel B. H. Vance	Mayor of New York City; 1875–1876	Succeeded by Smith Ely, Jr.
