= New York City Board of Aldermen =

Former legislature of New York City

Board of Aldermen of the City of New York
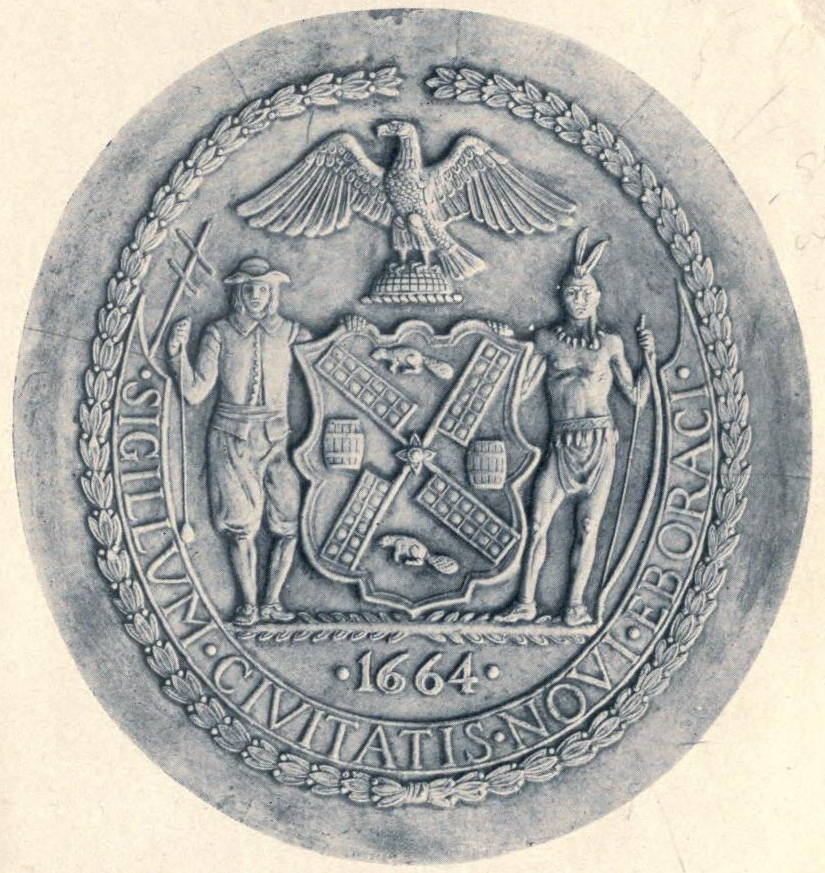
- The seal of New York City depicted in 1915

Type
- Type: Upper house (1824–1875); Lower house (1898–1901); Unicameral (1875–1897, 1902–1937)

History
- Established: 1824
- Disbanded: 1937

Leadership
- President: William F. Brunner (Note: As of December 21, 1937.)

Meeting place
- New York City Hall

The New York City Board of Aldermen was a body that was the upper house of New York City's Common Council from 1824 to 1875, the lower house of its Municipal Assembly from 1898 to 1901, and its unicameral legislature from 1875 to 1897 and 1902 to 1937. The corresponding lower house was known as the Board of Assistants or the Board of Assistant Aldermen from 1824 to 1875, while the upper house was known as the Council (Note: Without any such preceding modifier as "Common" or "City") from 1898 to 1901. In 1938 a new charter came into effect that replaced the Board of Aldermen with the New York City Council.

== Upper house (1824–1875) ==
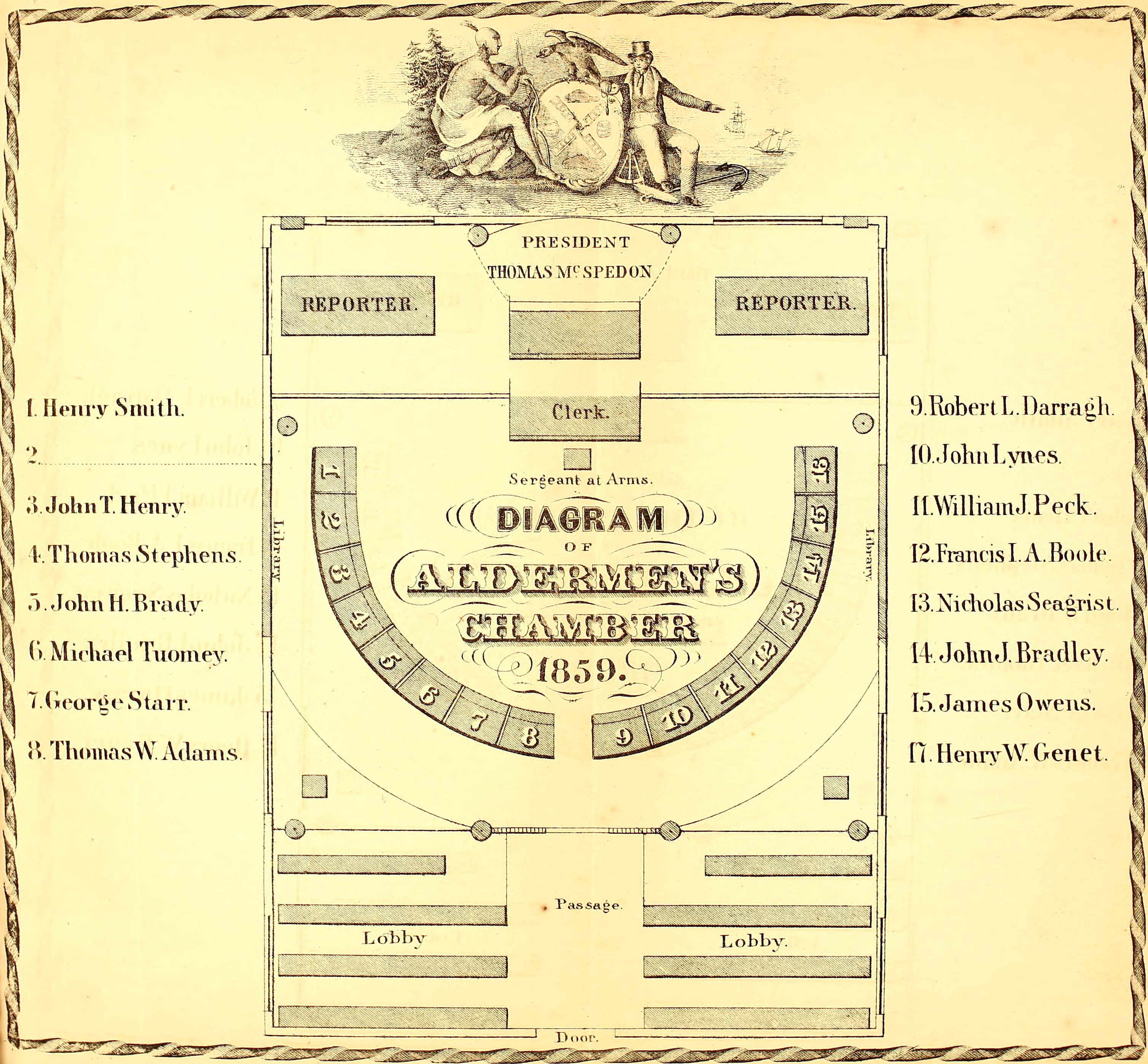
Diagram of the Aldermen's Chamber, 1859

Municipal legislators had been known as "aldermen" since at least April 1686, and had historically sat in the "Common Council" alongside so-called "assistant aldermen". In 1824 an Act of the New York State Legislature made the Common Council bicameral by dividing it into a Board of Aldermen and a Board of Assistants. Under the act the city was divided into wards which each elected one member to the Board of Aldermen and two to the Board of Assistants. Aldermen served two-year terms which were staggered such that half of the Board was elected every year while assistants were elected annually. This made the Common Council bicameral as both Boards were separate bodies who possessed veto power over each other's proceedings. The mayor was made the presiding officer of the Board of Aldermen, and in his absence the City Recorder, either person possessing only a casting vote in the Board. In an 1897 retrospective the Board of Assistant Aldermen would be known as the "lower branch" of the Common Council.

The New York State Legislature passed a bill in 1872 abolishing bicameralism in the fallout of Boss Tweed's corruption, which lavished on the assistant aldermen. At the time fifteen aldermen were elected at-large and one assistant alderman was elected from each Assembly district. The Senate had introduced an amendment to the new Charter that would have retained the Board of Assistant Aldermen but the amendment was dropped. Under the bill the Board of Aldermen would have comprised 45 members with 9 elected from each Senate district via cumulative voting. The Board would have elected its president from its own membership. The mayor would have had veto power over each ordinance, which the Board could override with a two-thirds vote. Governor John T. Hoffman vetoed the bill, claiming that New York City was too important for the experimental nature of the bill's provisions.

An act was definitively passed in 1873, abolishing the Board of Assistant Aldermen as of the first Monday of January 1875 (January 4), and thereby making the Common Council unicameral and coterminous with the Board of Aldermen. This was not uncontroversial, supporters of bicameralism arguing that the Board of Assistant Aldermen better represented local interests and served as a check against the at-large Board of Aldermen. A body claiming to be the Board of Assistant Aldermen composed mainly of former members met in January 1875 and argued that the 1873 Act was unconstitutional, although only two new members were elected thereto. Mayor William H. Wickham prohibited them from meeting and refused to recognize them, but they nevertheless held a meeting on January 20, entering the chamber clandestinely to avoid arrest.

== Unicameral council (1875–1897) ==
The Board of Aldermen under the 1873 act comprised 27 members elected annually, 6 elected at-large and 21 elected from State Senate districts with three from each district. Cumulative voting was limited, with a voter being entitled to vote for up to two aldermen in the district races and up to four aldermen in the at-large race. The Board elected its president from among its membership.

== Lower house (1898–1901) ==
When New York City annexed much of its surroundings and assumed its modern form in 1898, a new city charter was passed that reintroduced a bicameral legislature, this time known as the "Municipal Assembly". This was not uncontroversial; The New York Times noted the corruption associated with the city's previous attempt at bicameralism. Under this system the council was elected from special districts that each elected three members except for the districts representing Queens and Staten Island, which elected two members. Each member of the Board of Aldermen was elected from an Assembly district except for those representing Queens, where one member was elected from the former Long Island City and Newtown and one member from the remainder. The president of the council was directly elected by citizens of the City while the president of the Board of Aldermen was selected from among its membership. This bicameralism invited comparisons to the state legislature, with The Brooklyn Eagle comparing the council to "the State Senate ... [as] a superior body."

=== Abolition ===
The return to bicameralism proved to be short-lived, however, when a new charter passed in 1901 entailed removing the council and making the President of the Board of Aldermen directly elected by City citizens. This charter entered into effect in January 1902, making the municipal legislature once again unicameral.

== Return to unicameralism (1902–1937) ==
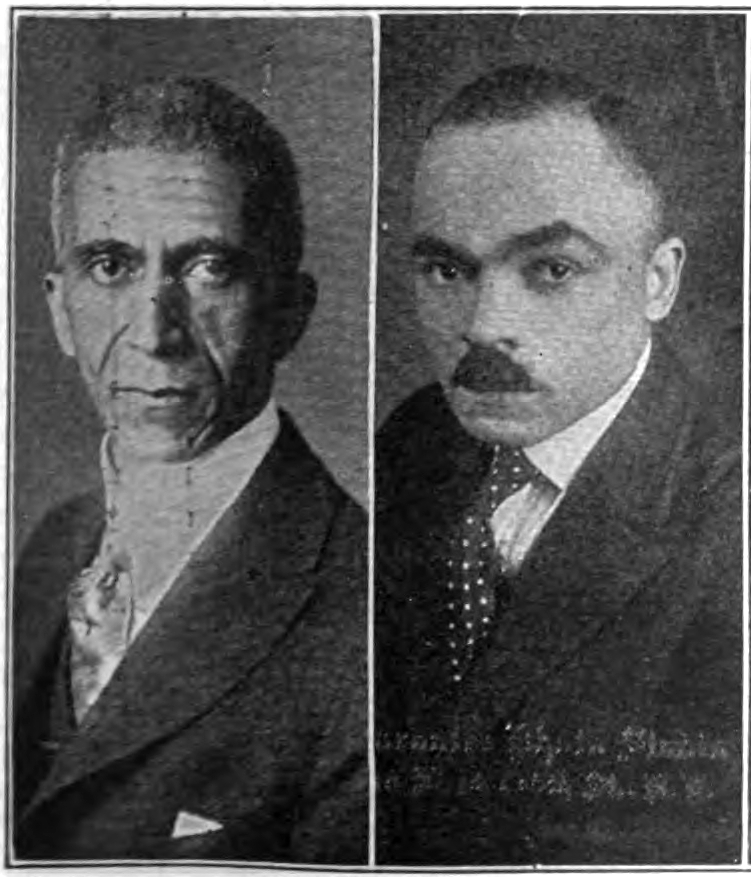
Charles H. Roberts (left) and George W. Harris, the first African Americans elected to the board in 1919

The new unicameral board comprised aldermen elected from special districts at one per district, the president of the Board of Aldermen, who was elected citywide, and the borough presidents. There were initially 73 districts, although in later years this was reduced to 65. The term of the president was four years while aldermen served two-year terms. Heads of administrative departments had seats in the board and could be compelled to answer questions of it and participate in debate, but were not entitled to vote.

=== New charter ===
Plans were made in the 1930s to introduce a new city charter that would replace the Board of Aldermen with a smaller City Council that would be elected from each borough via proportional representation. This was in large part due to the disproportionately-large Democratic majorities in the Board of Aldermen. The board convened for the last time on December 21, 1937.

Proportional representation was abolished in 1947 due in large part to its success at providing fairness by electing Communist council members who had sufficient votes.

== Bibliography ==
- "An Act to reorganize the local government of the city of New York". New York Daily Herald. No. 13, 025. April 19, 1872. pp. 3–4 – via Newspapers.com.
- "An Act to Reorganize the Local Government of the City of New York". New York Daily Herald. No. 13, 388. April 17, 1873. pp. 6–7 – via Newspapers.com.
- The Charter of the City of New York, Chapter 378 of the Laws of 1897, With amendments passed in 1898 and 1899, and a complete index, and maps of boroughs. Eagle library. Vol. Xiv, no. 6, serialno. 35. Eagle Building, Brooklyn: Office of Publication. September 1899.
