= Mayoralty of Fernando Wood =

Mayoralty in New York City (1855–57; 1860–61)

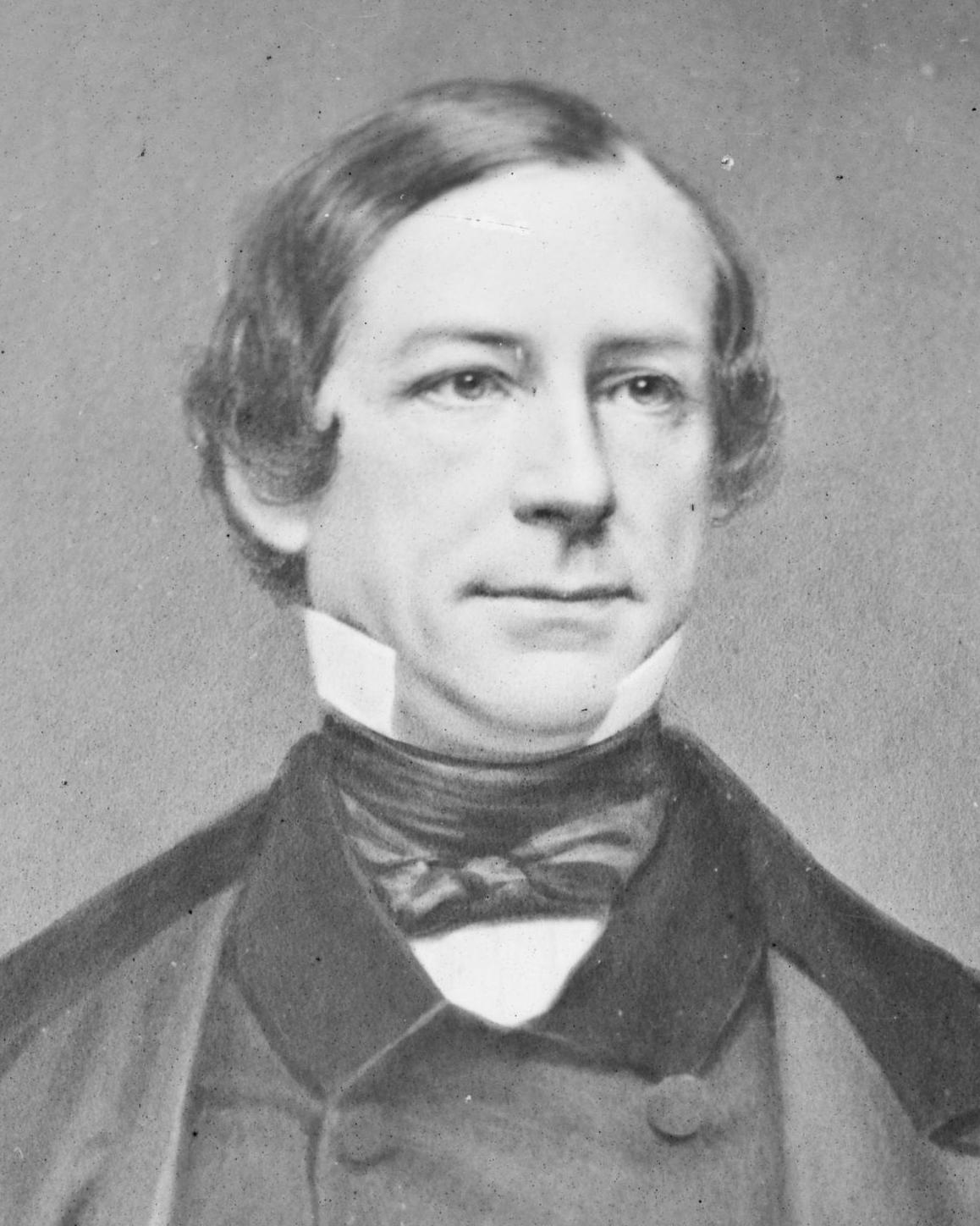
- Mayoralty of Fernando Wood
- Mayor: Fernando Wood
- Party: Democratic
- First term January 1, 1855 – December 31, 1857
- Election: 1854, 1856
- Second term January 1, 1860 – December 31, 1861
- Election: 1859

Fernando Wood served as the 74th and 76th mayor of New York City from January 1, 1855 to December 31, 1857 and January 1, 1860 to December 31, 1861.

== Background ==
=== 1850 election ===
At the 1849 New York Democratic Convention in Syracuse, the state Democratic Party reached a tenuous truce between its Hunker and Barnburner factions, promulgating a platform which advocated preservation of slavery where it already existed but recognizing the theoretical right of Congress to prevent the extension of slavery to new territories. The truce quickly collapsed into new divisions, with "Soft Shell Democrats" endorsing the Syracuse platform and "Hard Shells" firmly rejecting Congressional authority to regulate slavery in the territories. A small remaining contingent of Free Soil Democrats, led by John Van Buren, rejected the compromise and any attempt to expand slavery to the territories.

Despite his pro-slavery convictions, Wood stood for election as a Nineteenth Ward Democratic Committeeman on a Soft platform. Softs held the majority in Tammany Hall and Wood interpreted the Syracuse platform as a defense of slavery.

Throughout the 1849 and 1850 debates that led to the Compromise of 1850, Hards and Softs contested for control of Tammany Hall, sometimes physically. Wood chaired the Soft General Committee, urging for party unity. With two Committees claiming exclusive party control and voter fraud obscuring the Society's April 1850 council elections, the Tammany governing board dissolved both committees and called for a citywide convention to select an entirely new official General Committee. At this convention, Wood embraced the compromise position that Congress lacked control over slavery but that popular sovereignty could decide the issue for each new territory.

The convention deadlocked and new Tammany elections were held, producing a fusion Committee with a slight Hard majority, but Wood's position was embraced as the state party platform in 1850. Wood himself became the Democratic candidate for Mayor, despite some Hard resistance. In the general election, he was defeated by Whig oil dealer Ambrose C. Kingsland. The 1850 election was a landslide for the Whigs, who carried 15 wards, 13 out of 16 assembly races, and the governorship. Wood was dogged by a personal affair alleging he had defrauded his own relatives and received the lowest percentage for any Tammany candidate since direct elections for mayor began in 1834.

1850 New York City mayoral election
Party	Candidate	Votes	%
Whig	Ambrose C. Kingsland	22,478	55.17%
Democratic	Fernando Wood	18,052	44.31%
Independent	Alfred Carson	210	0.52%
Total votes		40,740	100.00%

=== 1854 election ===
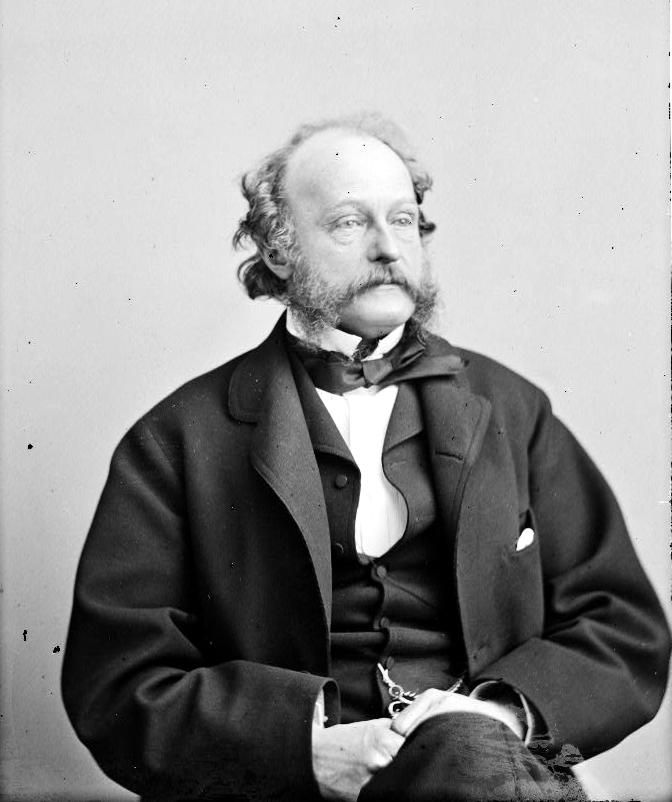
John Van Buren, the leader of New York's Free Soil Democrats and Wood's primary intra-city rival.

After his loss, Wood withdrew from politics again, focusing on his real estate portfolio and his growing family. The Whig Party collapsed and Tammany remained torn among its various factions. Wood began to test the waters for a political return in November 1853, privately organizing against John Van Buren's Free Soil faction and supporting the Young America Movement. He was elected a committeeman by the Nineteenth Ward Democrats once more.

In early 1854, the Kansas-Nebraska Act further scrambled city politics, alienating the Free Soil Democrats and bringing the Hards and Softs in closer alliance. In response, Wood planned a rally to celebrate Stephen Douglas and Franklin Pierce and denounce John Van Buren and his Free Soil Democrats, presenting the image of a party unified in its condemnation of the Free Soilers.

Wood cultivated his political image by siding with Governor Horatio Seymour in his veto of an alcohol prohibition bill, though he grounded his support in opposition to the regulation of private behavior, drawing a comparison between alcohol consumption and slavery. Perhaps most conniving of all, he secretly accepted a place on the Know-Nothing executive committee, despite his long standing political support among the New York immigrant community and his support for immigrant causes.

Wood won both the Soft and Hard nominations for Mayor easily, though a faction of extreme Hards formed yet another ticket and nominated Wilson H. Hunt. Running with the support of both major factions against a divided field, Wood had a strong advantage. However, his campaign was nearly upended when several Know-Nothings filed affidavits disclosing his membership in their committee. Wood denied the accusation and threatened to sue for libel.

On November 8, Wood was elected mayor of New York City with only 33.6% of the vote. The Know-Nothing nominee James W. Barker received 31% and Hunt received 25.8%. Despite the revelation of his Know-Nothingism, Wood's strongest support came from immigrant and low-income wards.

1854 New York City mayoral election
Party	Candidate	Votes	%
Democratic	Fernando Wood (incumbent)	20,003	33.54%
Know Nothing	James W. Barker	18,547	31.10%
Independent Democratic	Wilson G. Hunt	15,397	25.82%
Whig	John J. Herrick	5,696	9.55%
Total votes		59,643	100.00%

== First term (1855–56) ==
In his first two-year term, Wood prioritized municipal reform to strengthen the office of mayor and establish "one-man rule." With long-term goals of continued economic growth alongside reduced inequality and vice, Wood sought to reform the city government to empower reform by reducing the political restraint on his office. In the words of biographer Jerome Mushkat, Mayor Wood was "a unique figure, New York's first modern mayor, a city builder, and the prototype for later municipal leaders, a man who anticipated much of what would become the urban Progressive Movement."

However, any attempts at reform were quickly overshadowed by Wood's failure to answer accusations of corruption in his handling of the police force. His political base was eroded entirely in the 1855 elections, leaving Wood on the defensive for the remainder of his term. Nonetheless, his vision for the mayoralty as a powerful central executive and his campaign for greater home rule for the City came to define New York politics for generations.

=== Charter reform ===
In his inaugural address, Wood attacked the city charter as an "ill-shaped monster" which prevented home rule and called for a complete revision. So long as the New York Legislature failed to make such reforms, Wood pledged "to assume a general control over the whole City Government, so far as protecting its municipal interests." In Wood's view, the object of government was "to govern in the public interest, for aiding the many without threatening the few," and the existing municipal charter obstructed this purpose.

Efforts to reform the city charter, though popular within the city, faced an uphill battle in the state legislature, which was largely composed of Republicans, and the Common Council, which was personally opposed to Wood. In December 1856, after his-reelection to a two-year term, the Court of Appeals dismissed Wood's argument that the city could draw up its own charter or vote down one passed by the legislature. Republicans mobilized to do so and cuff Wood's power.

Early in his term, Wood instituted a "complaint book" where ordinary citizens could voice their complaints with city government.

=== Police corruption ===
A particular focus of Wood's first term was his control of the state's police force. Wood's inaugural address was particularly critical of the state management of the Police Department, where he felt the mayor's office lacked "the essential elements of authority, that of controlling the retention or removal of his own subordinates." On the margins, Wood personally reformed the department's medical section, awarded silver medals to outstanding officers at personal expense, and lectured officers to take pride in their work.

However, Wood sought wholesale reform of the police structure, along paramilitary lines with himself as commander. He urged the Common Council to replace the police board, which included two political rivals, with his sole authority. Though the Council ignored his message, the state legislature responded by introducing legislation for popular elections of the police chief and four elected commissioners. After Wood threatened his resignation, the legislature relented. Wood was elevated to de jure head of the police board, pledging to weed out incompetents, hire honest replacements, and promote efficient officers.

The 1856 elections were a major defeat for Wood-aligned candidates and marked an end to any crusade for reform. His opponents maintained their majority on the Common Council and only one Soft Shell Democrat, a Wood rival Lorenzo B. Shepard, was elected to city office.

The New York Times accused Wood of abusing his role to hire only foreign-born Democrats, but a March 21 meeting of the city's bankers, reformers (including his former critic Horace Greeley), and merchants praised his efforts and denounced the legislature. Criticism of his hiring patterns, led by the Times, intensified throughout his term. Wood claimed most of his hires were Whigs, but the Times countered that their Whig membership was merely a nominal cover to avoid scrutiny in past Whig administration. By July 1855, the Common Council demanded full information on all of Wood's appointments, renewals, and removals; he refused on a technicality. His growing popularity quickly waned.

During the 1856 campaign, a major issue was made of Wood's appointment practices. On election day, abuse of police powers to support his re-election effort drew still more criticism.

=== Public health ===
In summer 1855, Wood successfully lobbied for the city's first machine street sweepers, but the contracts were not renewed. After a cholera outbreak, Wood demanded an end to the city's licensed food distribution monopoly.

Wood faced a major crisis in 1855 when the merchant ship Joseph Walker sank in the city harbor, leading to complaints that its rotting cargo might spread disease. The bidder Wood selected to salvage the wreck delayed performance and the ship's grain hold began to rot, drawing accusations of corrupt hiring.

=== Urban planning and public works ===
Wood proposed utilizing the city's public works programs to provide jobs for unemployed laborers. However, Wood remained a believer in unrestricted private enterprise, and suggested that private industry step in for the city government wherever his initiatives were blocked by the Common Council.

Wood was an avowed critic of the New York & Harlem Railroad, warning about excessive speeding, high fares, and proposing numerous safety recommendations. He also opposed fare increases for the Staten Island ferry and urged greater care in future ferry contracts. He promoted Central Park, a plan approved just before he entered office, as a visionary leisure space for the working classes.

In his second year in office, Wood presented and promoted ambitious plans to improve the city's wharfs with permanent stone and brick structures and expedite the construction of city streets on a grid plan according to the unfinished Commissioners' Plan of 1811. He promoted expansion of the public school system.

=== Vice ===
Wood initially attempted to enforce Sunday closing laws and attempted a crackdown on prostitution and gambling in the city, though his efforts were obstructed by selective police enforcement, influential Democrats' investment in vice, and economic realities which left many women to choose between prostitution and starvation.

Wood walked a moderate, practical line on alcohol. When the Whig legislature passed a restrictive prohibition law in April 1855, Wood embraced the sweeping law as abrogated all older statutes and dropped his enforcement of the Sunday closing laws. He then instructed the police that the law was too vague to enforce; the law was ruled unconstitutional by the state judiciary.

=== 1856 gubernatorial campaign and re-election ===
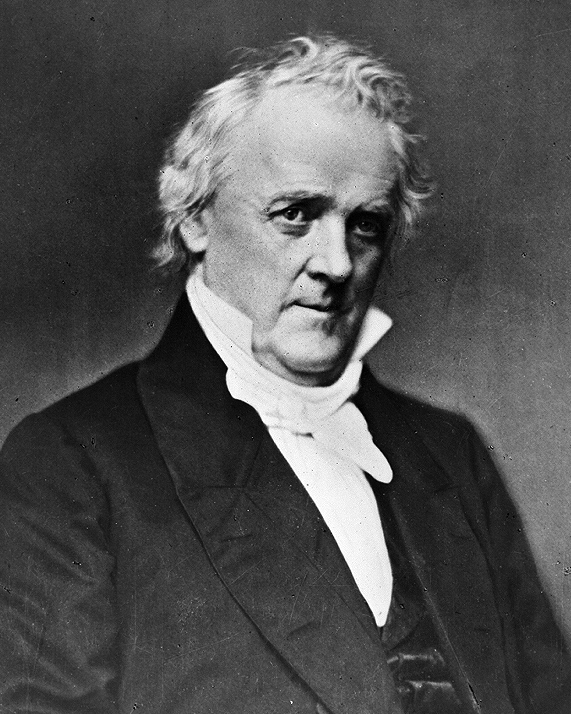
Wood was an early supporter of James Buchanan, but an expected endorsement of Wood's campaign for governor never materialized.

As mayor, Wood's power over Tammany Hall was nearly absolute, and he became a kingmaker in the 1856 presidential election, where he supported James Buchanan and befriended Buchanan's unofficial campaign manager, Daniel Sickles. When Buchanan visited New York, Wood hosted major Democratic fundraisers for his campaign. Buchanan ultimately emerged victorious at the 1856 Convention, elevating Wood on the state and national stage.

In advance of the July state convention, Wood presented himself as a candidate for governor and hoped Buchanan would reciprocate his support. However, opposition to Wood among Hards and some Softs was strong. Soft leaders Dean Richmond and Horatio Seymour favored Addison Gardiner or Amasa J. Parker, both moderates who could unify with the Hards, for the nomination. Despite Sickles's pleas, Buchanan declined to intervene. The Softs and Hards met in separate conventions at Syracuse, with Sickles and John Kelly managing the Wood campaign at both. Wood ultimately withdrew from the Soft convention in favor of Parker, who was then ratified as the Hard nominee.

After losing the nomination for governor, Wood refocused on city politics and announced his campaign for another term as mayor, claiming—but not proving—support from Buchanan. Wood publicly claimed his frustration with the charter drove him to prefer retirement, but also presented an open letter from nearly one hundred city businessmen begging him to run. Using his position in Tammany Hall, Wood ensured that the city convention gave him a majority. Dissident Hards and some Softs endorsed James Libby, with Know-Nothing Isaac O. Barker, Republican Anthony J. Bleeker, and Civic Reform candidate James R. Whiting rounding out the field.

The campaign was marked by personal attacks and violent street battles between the various city gangs. On election day, Wood released or furloughed some patrolmen to give his own gangs free rein to harass voters and obstruct vote counts. Wood won with 44.6% of the vote against Barker's 32.2% and Bleeker with 12.3%. Later investigations into Wood's electioneering failed to produce an indictment on the grounds that such practices were common in the city.

Wood maintained his reliance on immigrant wards, but ran well behind Buchanan's majority of 53.1% in the city and failed to capture the Common Council. Republicans remained in command of the state legislature and won the governorship as well, but within the city Wood had become impregnable. Rather than the historic split over slavery, the party became divided over those who supported Wood and those who opposed him.

1856 New York City mayoral election
Party	Candidate	Votes	%
Democratic	Fernando Wood (incumbent)	34,566	44.46%
Know Nothing	Isaac O. Barker	25,182	32.39%
Republican	Anthony J. Bleecker	9,671	12.44%
Independent Democratic	James S. Libby	4,684	6.03%
Reform Democratic	James R. Whiting	3,638	4.68%
Total votes		121,741	100.00%

== Second term (1857) ==
In Wood's second term, his control over Tammany Hall unraveled and his handling of the police force boiled over in the New York City Police riot, for which Wood was arrested.

In anticipation of an urban revolt, the Republican legislature revised the New York City charter to end his term early.

=== Fall from Tammany's and Buchanan's graces ===
After his re-election, Wood had nearly dictatorial control of the regular Democratic organization but faced organized opposition within the Tammany Society itself. Unbeknownst to Wood, Henry Wikoff had informed Buchanan that Wood had been trading on Buchanan's non-existent favor. Anti-Woodites came from a broad spectrum of the party and included his former ally Sickles, William M. Tweed, and Samuel J. Tilden. When Wood attempted to install a successor as Grand Sachem, a majority of the Council authorized an investigation into his tactics. A second General Committee was formed and Wood's was barred from the Tammany building.

Wood responded by bribing the building's lessee into allowing him to hold meetings. The council of Sachems now dissolved both committees and called for a new election based on a new "district association" system instead of the traditional ward primary. When Wood sponsored a ticket to oust the existing sachems, his forces were locked out of the reorganization meeting. A new General Committee under Edward Cooper was organized.

Wood also fell from favor with the Buchanan administration. Despite three trips to Washington in five months and an unsuccessful visit to Buchanan's home in Lancaster, Pennsylvania, his preferred choice for Collector of the Port of New York was passed over for Augustus Schell, an anti-Woodite. Wood's only ally among the federal appointments was Thomas Sedgwick as U.S. Attorney. While Wood was away from the city lobbying the administration, his opponents in Tammany filled the Society with anti-Wood appointees and officers.

=== Conflict with New York legislature ===
While Wood was focused on intra-party politics, the Republican legislature at Albany had begun efforts to destroy Wood.

Wood attempted to strike preemptively by sending the legislature a proposed charter revision, with Common Council support, that gave the mayor true executive power. The proposal would have given the mayor the right to appoint a cabinet subject to the consent of the Council and for-cause removal by the mayor. Most Council prerogatives would be ceded to the mayor and the Council would be reduced in numbers and elected on a staggered basis. The proposal was rejected, and the legislature conducted hearings into Wood's control of the police department.

==== Municipal Charter of 1857 ====
On April 15, the legislature presented Governor John Alsop King with a series of reform bills resulting in the Municipal Charter of 1857. It consolidated five independent agencies into three executive departments, Street, City Inspector, and Croton Aqueduct, each headed by a single mayoral appointee with aldermanic approval. Similar appointment methods were promulgated for ten mayoral clerks, the city chamberlain, two health commissioners, the superintendent, and the Harlem Bridge keeper. However, the Charter specified that none of the new appointment powers would take effect until after Wood's current term, which was truncated to end on January 1, 1858.

The mayor remained a full or ex officio member of various boards and had a full veto subject to two-thirds override by the Council. However, the new Charter provided for popular election of many key city administrators, removing them from the mayor's political control.

Perhaps most importantly, it ordered a new 1857 mayoral election for a new two-year term, truncating Wood's term to one year and separating mayoral elections from state and national elections, a practice which denied Wood (or any other Democrat) coattails effects from the Democratic president nominees who routinely carried the city. Although the New York City Charter extended mayoral terms to four years in 1897, the odd-year elections remained.

Separately, the legislature also established unprecedented state commissions, appointed by the Governor, to oversee the Harlem Bridge, construction of Central Park and a new city hall, and oversight of harbor pilots, wharves, and piers.

==== Metropolitan Police Act ====
Also on April 15, the legislature passed the Metropolitan Police Act, dissolving Wood's existing police force and replacing it with a metropolitan unit for New York, Richmond, Queens, and Kings Counties. The new unit was overseen by a five-man board appointed by the state, three members of which came from New York. Governor King appointed no Democratic Commissioners.

The Metropolitan Police Act set the ground for the eventual 1898 consolidation of modern New York City and effectively ended any prospects for home rule for New York, giving the state direct power over law and order within the city and tying that authority to the wants and needs of the neighboring counties.

==== Excise Act ====
On April 16, the legislature passed an Excise Act, a prohibitionist measure designed to enact the unsuccessful legislation passed in Wood's first term. It created a board of excise for each county consisting of three freeholders with the sole power to grant liquor licenses. Because of New York's massive population, small number of eligible freeholders, and disproportionate liquor use, licensing in the city was particularly cumbersome and expensive. The legislation outraged pro- and anti-Wood Democrats alike, giving Wood an opportunity to unify his party.

=== Traffic and sanitation policy ===
In January 1857, Wood called for more efficient street cleaning, increases in government salaries, and a ban on certain types of vehicles on Broadway to relieve congestion.

=== Police wars ===
Determined to fight back against the legislative encroachment on city authority, Wood staked his ground on defiance of the Police Act. He informed U.S. Attorney Thomas Sedgwick of his intent to take "offensive action" and sponsored a Council resolution declaring it unconstitutional and appropriating $10,000 for a legal challenge. While the challenge was pending, two rival police forces, Wood's Municipals and the state Metropolitans. Officers were forced to choose sides, afraid they would be eventually fired if the took the losing side.

The temporary suspension of appointment powers under the 1857 charter became an issue in June, when Street Commissioner Joseph S. Taylor's death created a vacancy. Wood and Governor King both appointed competing men to the role. On June 16, King's appointee arrived at city hall to take office and Wood had his Municipals physically remove him.

He returned with writs and warrants backed by the Metropolitans calling for Wood's arrest. When the Metropolitans attempted to serve Wood, his Municipals created a protective shield around the building and unruly crowds harassed them. Amid cries of "Fernandy Wood" and "Down with the Black Republicans!" the Metropolitans were subject to clubbings and street skirmishes. Recorder James Smith called in the Seventh Regiment of the New York Militia, at which time Wood orchestrated his own arrest by the sheriff for contempt of court. His case was then dismissed by Judge Murray Hoffman on the grounds that Wood was a "law-abiding and order-loving citizen."

On July 2, the New York Court of Appeals ordered the Municipals to demand in a majority opinion written by Chief Justice Hiram Denio. Wood accepted the judgment and took his seat on the Metropolitan Board, leading some Municipals to sue him for lost wages. The city descended into anarchy, with the Wood-aligned gang Dead Rabbits touching off a riot against the Metropolitans and Bowery Boys that caused extensive property damage, though no deaths.

=== 1857 election ===
With Wood's term truncated to one year, a new election was scheduled for December.

Wood's campaign for re-nomination was buoyed by Buchanan, who demanded that the city Democrats unify ahead of the 1857 elections. A single nominating convention was held, with Wood's delegation winning a credentials contest in order to split the delegation. Wood personally wrote the platform, praising immigration, the Dred Scott v. Sanford decision, Buchanan's efforts against "slavery agitation in Kansas," and home rule for the city. The platform criticized prohibition as an invasion of private rights and denounced Republican efforts for equal manhood suffrage for blacks. Wood won re-nomination for a fourth consecutive election with 95 of 106 votes on the first ballot against Charles Godfrey Gunther.

Wood maintained party unity through the general election, but his campaign was complicated by the Panic of 1857, which sent economic gridlock through the city. In early October, unemployment was estimated at 30,000, increasing at a rate of 1,000 per day. Wood departed from his traditional economic liberalism to avoid class conflict, proposing massive public works programs to feed and fund the poor.

In the November state elections, Democrats won a sweeping victory. It proved a double-edged sword, satisfying Buchanan and freeing Tammany critics to abandon Wood. On November 15, Tammany Hall held a fusion meeting with Republicans and Know-Nothings, which resulted in a non-partisan ten-man nominating committee composed of commercial leaders. After failing to recruit William F. Havemeyer, the committee nominated Democrat Daniel F. Tiemann on a "People's Party" ticket.

Wood ran his campaign as a partisan Democrat, challenging Tiemann as a covert Republican and Know-Nothing. Amid record turnout, Tiemann defeated Wood by 2,317 votes, 51.4% to 48.6%. Wood's support among immigrants and ethnics, particularly Germans, decreased marginally. Tiemann carried all six West Side wards by a substantial majority of 65.6%.

1857 New York City mayoral election
Party	Candidate	Votes	%
People's	Daniel F. Tiemann	43,216	51.38%
Democratic	Fernando Wood (incumbent)	40,889	48.62%
Total votes		84,105	100.00%

== Interregnum (1858–59) ==
Upon Wood's exit from office, he was declared politically dead. Instead, he purchased the New York Daily News, left Tammany Hall, and built his own independent political base in preparation for his return to politics. His new organization, known as the Mozart Hall Society, would propel him back into the mayor's office after just two years away.

=== New York Daily News ===
In 1857, Wood purchased the New York Daily News for $5,600 and later installed his brother, Benjamin, as editor. He used the paper as his personal bulletin, boosting his own platform and haranguing opponents and enemies.

=== Mozart Hall Society ===
In the April 1857 Tammany elections, Wood campaigned for control of the organization but lost by a margin of two to one; his supporters blamed the enrollment of secret "Black Republicans" and Wood left Tammany Hall. He founded a "Democratic Society of Regulators" with membership open to any New York City Democrat. Wood's organization came to be called the "Mozart Hall Democrats" after the hotel where they met at the corner of Bond Street and Broadway. The society was composed largely of immigrants, workers, and the poor.

Wood spent much of 1858 and 1859 trying to play the various presidential candidates off of each other to elevate his friend Henry A. Wise, now Governor of Virginia, as a compromise candidate. His maneuvering ultimately failed when Wise wrote a letter highly critical of Stephen A. Douglas and Governor of New York Daniel S. Dickinson, effectively ending his chances at the nomination.

At the 1858 convention, Wood's manipulation was revealed, and Daniel Sickles succeeded in having Mozart delegates barred. In return, Wood unsuccessfully opposed Sickles's re-election to Congress. The split between Tammany and Mozart allowed Republicans to pick up several offices in the city. In December 1858, President Buchanan responded by granting all patronage at the Port of New York to Tammany, further isolating Wood. Tammany offered him re-admittance, but he declined.

=== 1859 election ===
At the 1859 convention, Wood's Mozart delegates enlisted armed force to seize the convention, beginning proceedings without the Tammany delegates (a traditional Tammany strategy) and using armed violence to prevent any challenge to their proceedings. Nevertheless, Wood's violent tactics drew backlash and forever alienated him from respectable politics.

Two Democratic tickets were nominated in the city, with Wood heading the Mozart Hall slate and the Fifth Avenue Democrats, a group of wealthy, highly conservative men including August Belmont and Samuel J. Tilden, forced the nomination of William Frederick Havemeyer on a Tammany ticket. Republicans nominated George Opdyke, a banker and former Free Soiler.

Primarily through the Daily News, Wood attacked the Tammany–Fifth Avenue fusion as "kid-glove, scented, silk stocking, poodle-headed, degenerate aristocracy" who were out of touch with real Democrats. Wood also delivered a series of pro-slavery and pro-Southern speeches, decrying John Brown and abolitionism as a threat to the Union. Privately, he advised Governor Wise not to execute Brown in fears of stirring sympathy for abolition.

Both Democrats and Republicans attacked Wood for his past corruption and his "imperial" ambition.

In an election with 88.1% turnout, Wood pulled off a narrow three way victory. He received 38.3% of the vote against 34.6% for Havemeyer and 27.4% for Opdyke.

1859 New York City mayoral election
Party	Candidate	Votes	%
Independent Democratic	Fernando Wood	29,940	38.25%
Democratic	William F. Havemeyer	26,913	34.39%
Republican	George Opdyke	21,417	27.36%
Total votes		78,170	100.00%

== Third term (1860–61) ==
Entering office on January 1, 1860, Wood continued to emphasize the themes of his first two terms, namely progressive urbanism, mayoral autocracy, reduction in wasteful spending, and home rule for the City. However, with Mozart Hall only controlling a minority of the Common Council seats and opposed by the New York Legislature and city board of supervisors, he was unable to implement most of his agenda. Most of his proposals were blocked or ignored by the Common Council, and many Tiemann appointees remained in office.

In 1860, Governor Edwin D. Morgan removed Wood and the mayor of Brooklyn from the metropolitan police commission, reducing it from seven members to three. Wood struggled to gain public sympathy against the move, as many New Yorkers were still skeptical of Wood's management of the police following the 1857 riots.

Instead, Wood focused his third term on national politics, particularly advancing the interests of Southern Democrats. His most famous declaration in that regard came in his January 7, 1861 annual address, when he proposed to make New York a "free city" in the wake of Southern secession. However, following the outbreak of the American Civil War, Wood moderated his positions and actively supported the war effort.

=== 1860 presidential election ===
At a February 1860 strategy session, Wood spoke on behalf of pro-slavery Northerners, in which he called for the party to "extinguish the anti-slavery fiend stalking the country" in order to stave off "an eternal separation". Wood argued that "until we have provided and cared for the oppressed laboring man in our own midst, we should not extend our sympathy to the laboring men of other States." His speech won support in the South, and he sought to elect pro-slavery Mozart Hall delegates to the 1860 Democratic National Convention. To advance his aims, he campaigned in Connecticut ahead of the competitive elections, winning further support from Southerners. By the time he arrived in Charleston for the National Convention, The New York Times bitterly reported that his "name [was] strong and high on the list of candidates for Vice-President, and in case of trouble, it may yet be found a peg higher."

However, in a sign of the chaos which would ultimately upend the Charleston convention, Douglas supporters blocked Wood's delegates from the floor by voting to seat a competing slate of delegates elected by the Albany Regency and led by Dean Richmond and referring the contest to the credentials committee by a vote of 256 to 47. The committee ruled against Wood by a vote of 27 to 7, and an effort to seat both delegations as partial members failed. When no candidate proved able to win the two-thirds necessary for nomination, a requirement passed with the support of Richmond's delegates, the convention disbanded without a nominee. For many years afterwards, observers (including President James Buchanan) speculated that admitting the Wood delegates, even as partial members of the convention, could have prevented the two-thirds rule and avoided the deadlock.

In the fall election, Wood proposed a fusion between the two tickets of John C. Breckinridge and Stephen A. Douglas in a desperate effort to prevent the election of Abraham Lincoln. Although the proposal was ultimately adopted (with additional support from the Constitutional Union Party), Wood's vacillation between Southern sympathizer and moderate unifier left him without a clear place in the New York Democratic Party and began to sow dissent within his own Mozart Hall organization. In the December municipal elections, Wood's Mozart candidates won only two of nine seats on the Board of Aldermen.

=== 1861 annual address and Copperhead activism ===
The most controversial episode of Wood's mayoralty came in his January 7, 1861 annual address to the Common Council, in which he called for New York to secede from the state of New York to become a "free city". Drawing a link between the implicit threat Lincoln's election posed to the South, where a number of states had already declared independence, and the Republican legislature's long-standing resistance to home rule for the city, Wood delivered a message sympathetic to secession and critical of nationalism. He cited New York City's friendly relationships and commercial ties with "our aggrieved brethren of the slave states" and defended their "constitutional rights" and "domestic institutions." While he said "dissolution of the Federal Union [was] inevitable" and "our government cannot be preserved by coercion or held together by force", Wood argued that the ties between the South and New York City were stronger than those between the city and the state of New York.

While the idea of an independent New York City predated Wood's mayoralty and was consistent with his long crusade for home rule, the speech, coming on the heels of Lincoln's election and secession movements throughout the South, was extremely controversial. Critics and political enemies questioned Wood's loyalty to the Union, and the address was unpopular even within the Democratic Party, outside of a small number of Breckinridge supporters and his own New York Daily News. As the face of Southern sympathy in the North, Wood was saddled with a steadily mounting image as a traitor during wartime.

Wood made little effort to adjust his position as the tensions with the South mounted. On January 23, he criticized the Metropolitan Police seizure of the steamer Monticello and its cargo, including thirty-eight boxes of muskets and ammunition bound for Savannah, Georgia, and apologized to Georgia senator Robert A. Toombs for the "illegal and unjustifiable seizure of public property". On February 22, when Lincoln visited the city during his inaugural tour, Wood took the opportunity to ask the president-elect "for a restoration of fraternal relations between the states–only to be accomplished by peaceful and conciliatory means–aided by the wisdom of God." Though the episode drew fresh criticism in the press, Lincoln surprised those present by wholeheartedly agreeing with Wood. The visit marked the first step in working, if adversarial, relationship between Lincoln and Wood that would continue on the latter's election to Congress. When Lincoln was inaugurated on March 4, Wood refused to dip the American flag as a traditional sign of respect.

=== Civil War ===
After the outbreak of hostilities at Fort Sumter on April 15, Wood and the Daily News offices were placed under police protection. He issued a call for citizens "irrespective of all other considerations and prejudices" to obey the law, preserve order, and protect property. In a moderation of his prewar position, he actively raised funds and troops to support the Union war effort and spoke at the city's first Union rally literally draped in the American flag. He lavished Colonel Robert Anderson, the "hero of Ft. Sumter", with public praise and sent Lincoln a public letter volunteering for duty and offering "my services in any military capacity consistent with my position as Mayor of New York City."

== Aftermath and legacy ==
Wood left office on December 1, 1862. He was quickly elected to represent the Lower East Side in the United States House of Representatives in November of the same year. Although redistricting led to his defeat in 1864, he was returned to the House in 1866 and was elected to represent New York for eight more consecutive terms until his death in 1881, rising to leader of the House Democratic Caucus and chair of the House Committee on Ways and Means. Wood made a final campaign for mayor in 1867, but was badly defeated by John T. Hoffman.

=== Historical assessments ===
A 1985 survey of historians, political scientists and urban experts conducted by Melvin G. Holli of the University of Illinois at Chicago ranked Wood as the third-worst American big-city mayor to have been in office since 1820. A 1993 edition of the same survey saw Wood ranked as the eighth-worst.
