= Tammany Hall =

New York Democratic political organization

- The Tammany Hall logo, based on the emblem on its headquarters at 44 Union Square
- Named after: Tamanend (anglicized to "Tammany"), Lenape leader
- Formation: May 12, 1789; 237 years ago
- Founder: William Mooney
- Founded at: New York City, U.S.
- Dissolved: 1967; 59 years ago
- Merger of: Tammanies
- Type: Democratic pressure group
- Legal status: Defunct
- Headquarters: Several: last was at 233 Madison Avenue at East 37th Street, New York City
- Location: New York City, with connections in all of New York State
- Services: Patronage
- Sachem (Boss): William Mooney (first); J. Raymond Jones (last)
- Key people: Aaron Burr, William M. Tweed, Fernando Wood, Richard Croker, Lewis Nixon, Carmine DeSapio, Charles Francis Murphy
- Affiliations: Democratic Party

Tammany Hall, also known as the Society of St. Tammany, the Sons of St. Tammany, or the Columbian Order, was an American political organization founded in 1786 and incorporated on May 12, 1789, as the Tammany Society. It became the main local political machine of the left wing of the Democratic Party and played a major role in controlling New York City and New York state politics, especially rent regulations and inequality-reducing policies. Though initially an independent social organization, at its peak, Tammany Hall became synonymous with the New York County Democratic Party.

At its founding, the Society of St. Tammany was a social fraternal organization and one branch of a network of Tammany societies throughout the new United States of America. Politically, its members were Jeffersonian republicans opposed to the Manhattan aristocracy. As the immigrant population of New York grew, Tammany Hall became an important social and political organization, for Irish Catholic immigrants in particular. Following the 1854 mayoral election and the resulting mayoralty of Fernando Wood, Tammany Hall controlled Democratic Party nominations and political patronage in Manhattan for over a century through its organized network of loyal, well-rewarded, and largely Irish Catholic district and precinct leaders. It also gained support from the New York City business community for its efficient, if corrupt, solutions to problems.

At its peak, Tammany Hall also played a major role in state and national politics, particularly during the Gilded Age, when New York was sharply contested as a swing state, and it hosted the 1868 Democratic National Convention. Its positions typically represented the interests of its immigrant, ethnic, and Catholic voter base, in addition to the personal interests of its leadership. Prominent members or associates of Tammany included Aaron Burr, Martin Van Buren, Fernando Wood, Jimmy Walker, Robert F. Wagner, and Al Smith.

The Tammany Hall organization was also a frequent vehicle for political graft, most famously during the leadership of William M. Tweed, whose 1873 conviction for embezzlement gave the organization its national reputation for corruption. In the following decades, many reformist New York politicians developed national reputations opposing or criticizing Tammany influence, including Samuel J. Tilden, Grover Cleveland, Theodore Roosevelt, Franklin D. Roosevelt, Fiorello La Guardia, Robert Moses, Thomas E. Dewey, Jacob Javits, and Ed Koch.

Tammany Hall declined during the twentieth century, following the 1898 consolidation of greater New York City, which forced it to compete directly with other local organizations, and decades of sustained opposition from reform activists and changing demographics in Manhattan. It was dissolved in 1967.

== History ==
=== Background ===
Before 1898, New York City was coterminous with the island of Manhattan and New York County. As the population center of New York state, one of the largest states in the new United States of America, in addition to its status as a commercial center for the continent, struggles for control of city, county, state, and national offices were fierce.

The 1686 charter divided the city into six wards and established a Common Council consisting of an alderman and assistant alderman from each ward. Until 1938, wards were the smallest political units in New York City and the building block of its political organizations.

Under the 1686 charter, the mayor of New York City was appointed by the state government. In 1821, the Common Council was given authority to elect the mayor until, in 1834, the state constitution was amended to require the election of the mayor by direct popular vote.

=== Early history ===
The Tammany Society was founded in New York City (at the time coterminous with both the island of Manhattan and New York County) on May 12, 1789, as a club for "pure Americans" and one branch of a wider network of Tammany Societies, the first of which had been formed in Philadelphia in 1772. The name "Tammany" came from Tamanend, a chief of the Lenape in the late seventeenth century who had become a folk hero and symbol of America, particularly in the area around Philadelphia. The Society adopted many Native American words and customs, including referring to their meeting hall as a "wigwam" and their leader as a "grand sachem". (Note: The Native American titles and customs were briefly suspended during the War of 1812, following attacks by native tribes on white settlers.)

The first Grand Sachem of the Tammany Society was William Mooney, a Nassau Street upholsterer. Although Mooney held the nominal leadership role, wealthy merchant and philanthropist John Pintard established the Society's constitution and its various Native American titles. Pintard declared the Society to be "[a] political institution founded on a strong republican basis whose democratic principles will serve in some measure to correct the aristocracy of our city." In 1790, the Society assisted the federal government in procuring a peace treaty with the Muscogee at the request of President George Washington.

Although many of its earliest civic activities were not explicitly political, the Tammany Society attracted supporters of Governor George Clinton and U.S. secretary of state Thomas Jefferson. At the time, New York state politics were divided between the Clintons, the Schuyler family (including U.S. treasury secretary Alexander Hamilton), and the Livingston family. In 1793, the Society hosted Edmond-Charles Genêt, the controversial representative of the French First Republic to the United States.

==== Aaron Burr and Matthew Davis era (1798–1804) ====
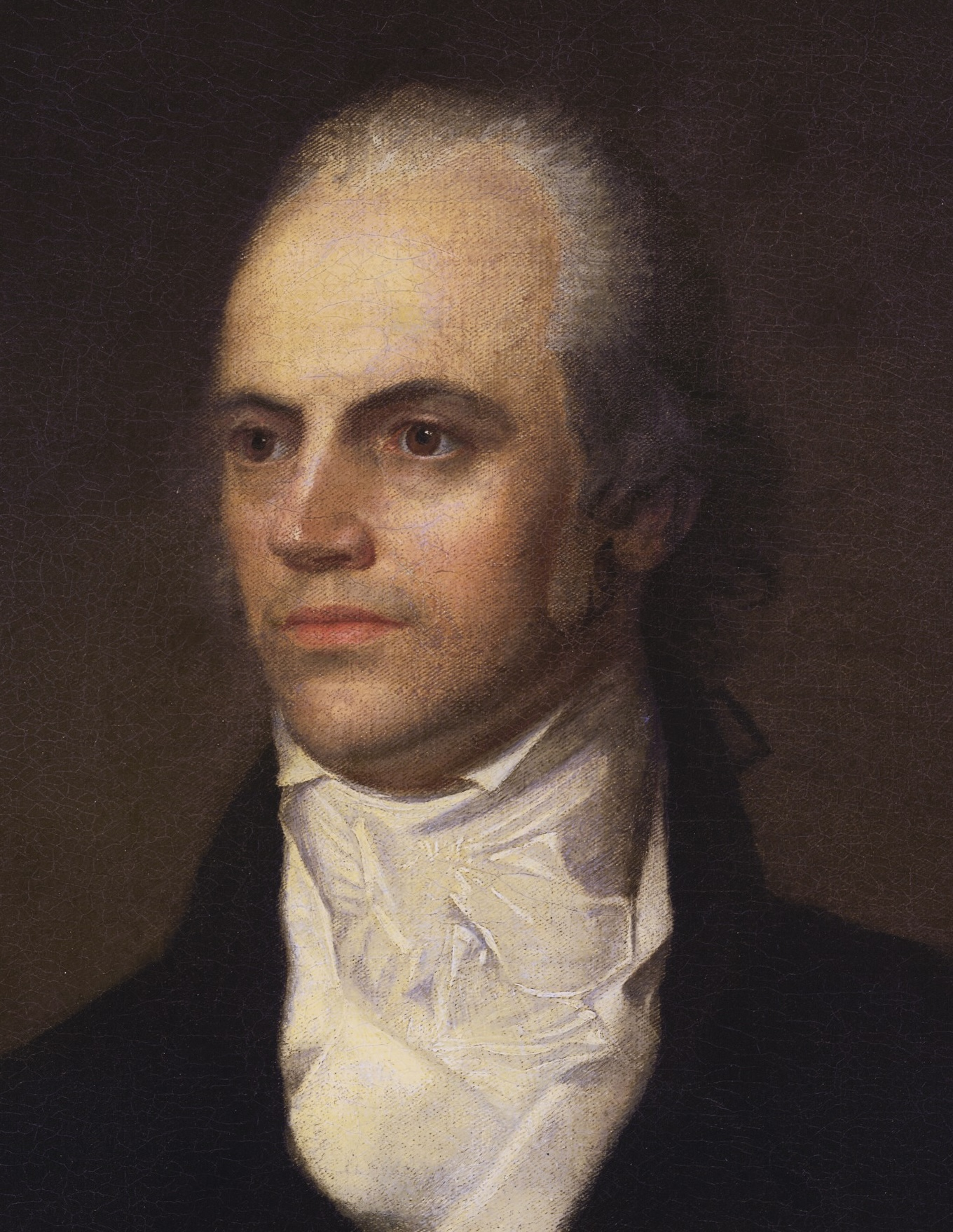
Vice president Aaron Burr was the first to employ the Tammany Society as a vehicle for political gain.

By 1798, the Society had grown increasingly political and supportive of the Jeffersonian republican cause. One of the city's leading politicians, Aaron Burr, saw Tammany as an opportunity to counter the Society of the Cincinnati, a fraternal organization largely populated by supporters of Alexander Hamilton and the Schuyler family. Through Burr's influence, Tammany emerged as the center of Jeffersonian politics in New York City. Burr used the Society, along with his own Manhattan Company, as a campaign asset during the 1800 presidential election. Some historians believe that without Tammany support, President John Adams might have won re-election. However, Burr alienated many supporters by opposing Jefferson in the contingent election in the United States House of Representatives, after the electoral college vote resulted in a tie between Burr and Jefferson.

In 1802, the Society became embroiled in party politics when U.S. senator DeWitt Clinton, the nephew of the governor, publicly attacked Burr, resulting in a duel between Clinton and Burr supporter John Swartwout. Clinton resigned from the Senate in 1803 to become mayor of New York City and used the position to distribute patronage to his family and supporters, alienating Tammany and emphasizing the growth of the spoils system in the city.

After Burr killed Alexander Hamilton in a duel, he was forced to leave politics in shame. He was succeeded as Tammany leader in 1805 by Matthew L. Davis, a friend and supporter who instituted many of the innovations which would establish the Society as a powerful political machine. Davis began by securing a state charter for the society as a charitable organization and establishing the General Committee of Tammany Hall, which would thereafter play kingmaker in party politics in New York City. One Tammany member by the name of Wortman, established the practice of an investigatory committee consisting of one member from each ward, which would identify political friends and foes and report on their movements to general meetings.

Corruption scandals tainted Tammany Hall from its early days. In 1808, local opinion turned against Tammany after public investigations by the New York Common Council revealed that a number of officials were guilty of embezzlement and other abuses of power. For example, New York City comptroller Benjamin Romaine was found guilty of using his authority to acquire land without payment and was ultimately removed from his office, despite the Council being controlled by Democratic-Republicans. In response to growing public disapproval and election defeats, Davis organized the Society's first public relations stunt, reinterring the remains of thirteen Revolutionary War soldiers who died in British prison ships and were buried in shallow graves at Wallabout Bay. On April 13, 1808, a dedication ceremony was held and symbolic coffins were sailed to Brooklyn. The state voted to provide $1,000 to build a monument, but the money was pocketed, and the monument was not built until 1867.

In response to the scandals, the Society began to accept immigrants as members and accepted outside involvement from a Democratic-Republican Committee consisting of influential local party members, who could name new sachems. This was the case for Federalists who joined the Society. Tammany Hall managed to gain power, as well as reduce Clinton and his followers to just a small fraction.

Nevertheless, under Davis's leadership, Tammany became a powerful opposition to both DeWitt Clinton and the Federalist Party in New York City, and Tammany's fortunes waxed and waned in proportion to Clinton's. In 1806, Tammany briefly supported Clinton against the Livingston family, led by Edward Livingston and Morgan Lewis, before the feud quickly resumed. The feud intensified in 1809, when state printer James Cheetham attacked the society for corruption in his newspaper. Tammany forced Cheetham's removal as printer, and Clinton was forced to pull his support and patronage for the rising political star. Cheetham retaliated by printing attacks on both Tammany and Clinton, whom he accused of a corrupt bargain, before dying of a heart attack on September 18, 1810.

When Clinton challenged President James Madison in 1812, he alienated many former supporters, ceding control of the party to Tammany. The Society also picked up support from former Federalists who had supported Madison's leadership during the War of 1812. Perhaps the most important innovation of the Tammany machine during this period was an emphasis on incorporating new membership rather than cooperating with other political societies and organizations. During the period during and after the war, Tammany accepted a number of former Federalists who were rewarded handsomely.

==== Albany Regency (1817–1828) and control of patronage ====
In 1815, Tammany grand sachem John Ferguson defeated Dewitt Clinton and was elected mayor. However, Clinton was elected governor in 1817 and remained in office until his death in 1828, except for a two-year hiatus. During Clinton's term as governor, upstate politician Martin Van Buren and his allies in the city, a group known as the Albany Regency, gained control of Tammany. They used the machine to push for expanded voting rights, which culminated in the enfranchisement of all white men in 1821, enhancing Tammany influence. During the 1828 presidential election, Tammany leaders met with Andrew Jackson and agreed to endorse him after he promised to give them control over federal patronage jobs in the city. After he was elected president, Jackson fulfilled his promise. By utilizing its control over federal employment in New York City and status as the city affiliate of the national Democratic Party, Tammany controlled most of the New York City elections afterwards.

Although Tammany was dedicated to the defense of the Jackson administration against the Whig Party, it faced intraparty competition from the Locofoco faction, which sought to appeal to working class men on a platform of opposition to monopoly and support for labor.

=== Ascent and corruption (1834–1867) ===
==== Immigrant support ====
During its domination by the Albany Regency, the Society also began to accept immigrants as members. DeWitt Clinton had gained political support by appointing immigrants to patronage positions, while Tammany had originally been dedicated to representing "pure" Americans. For many years, this meant that the Society dismissed or marginalized Irish and German New Yorkers. On April 24, 1817, immigrant discontent led to a huge riot during a Tammany general committee session. Following the 1821 voting reforms, however, acceptance became a political necessity. Tammany eventually came to depend on Irish immigration as its source of viability.

In the 1840s, over 130,000 Irish immigrants arrived in New York City to escape the Great Famine, arriving in poverty and joining scores of thousands of their fellow countrymen who had arrived over the prior decades. By 1855, 34 percent of the city's voter population was composed of Irish immigrants. By providing these new arrivals with patronage employment, job referrals, legal aid, food, shelter, employment insurance, and other extralegal services, including citizenship and naturalization services, Tammany secured the lifelong support of the large and growing Irish population, which would form the majority of its electoral base for the next century. In exchange for these services, the Tammany political machine harvested Irish immigrant votes.

By 1854, the support Tammany Hall received from immigrants would firmly establish the organization as the leader of New York City's political scene. With the election of Fernando Wood, the first person to be supported by the Tammany Hall machine, as mayor in 1854, Tammany would proceed to dominate the political arena until the mayoralty of Fiorello La Guardia.

==== Gang violence and corruption ====
During the 1834 elections, the first in which the popular vote elected the mayor, both Tammany and the Whigs, from their headquarters at the Masonic Hall, battled in the streets for votes and engaged in voter intimidation. Voter intimidation efforts and the collapse of the American economy in the Panic of 1837 led to the rise of political gangs, who used violence and threats of violence to secure political power within the city. During the 1840s, competing political gangs fought for physical territory in a struggle to control the Tammany Society and the city. Isaiah Rynders, a Tammany leader from the sixth ward and member of the General Committee, coordinated campaigns of violence against Tammany opponents (including the growing nativist movement) and rival factions. Many of the gang leaders coordinated their activities from saloons, which became a target of prohibitionists and reformers.

As the economy began to recover in the 1850s, Tammany profited. In 1852, Tammany gained sweeping control of the City Council, which soon gained a reputation for its corruption. Although aldermen received no formal salary, they used their considerable explicit and implicit authority, which included the power to appoint police and license saloons, to grant franchises for streetcar lines and ferries, and to sit as judges in criminal court, to enrich themselves, their friends, and the Society. Fraudulent real estate deals using city funds or land and expensive boondoggles became common practice, and aldermen used the implicit threat of financial harm from legislation to extract fees from business and land owners. In June 1853, a movement to reform the city charter grew as the public became aware of corruption on the Council, whom they dubbed the "Forty Thieves". The reformers proposed competitive bidding for city contracts and franchises, and harsh punishments for bribery. The charter reform movement was the first organized independent opposition, which would become a constant theme in Tammany history.

==== Fernando Wood era and Mozart Hall conflict (1855–1867) ====
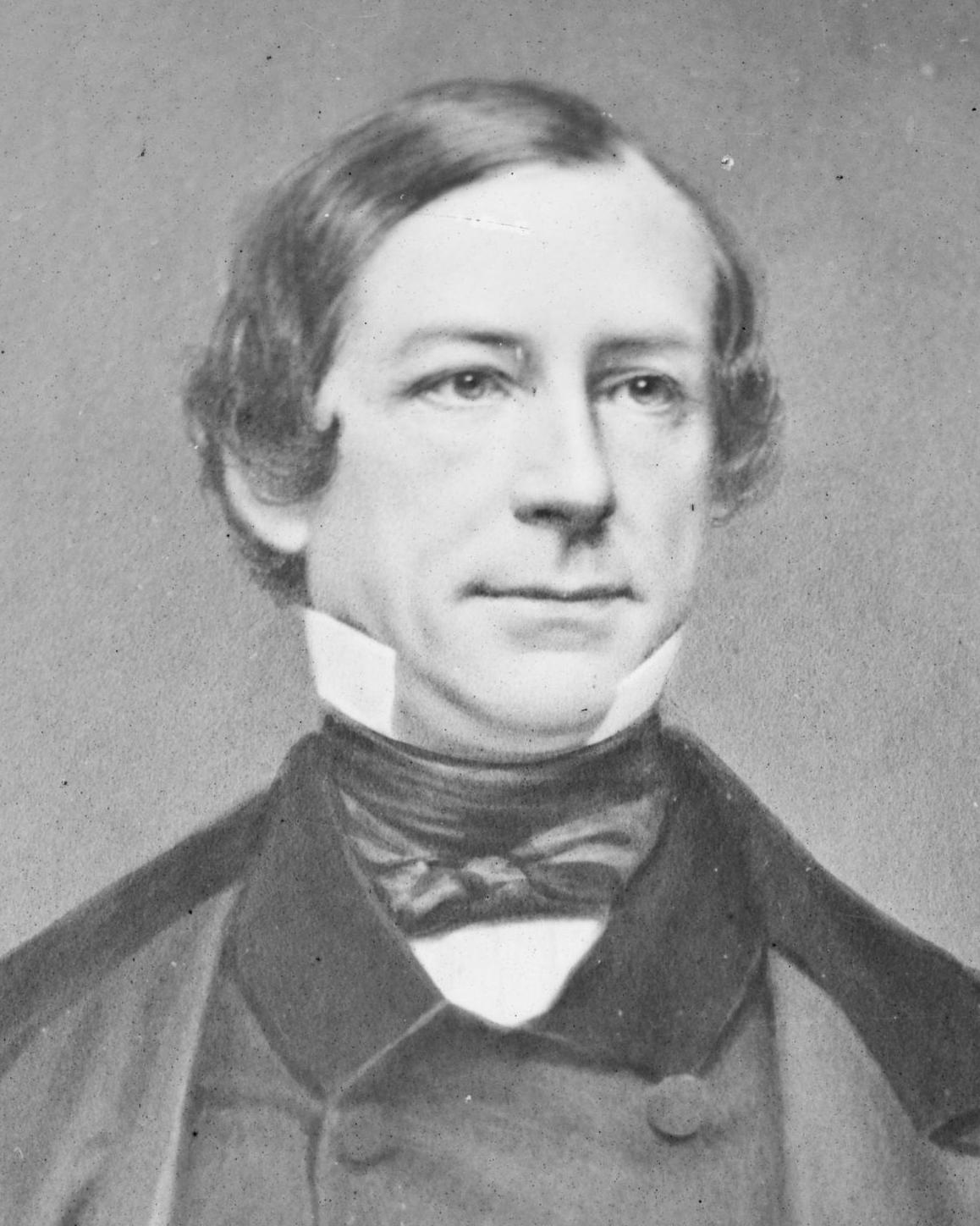
Fernando Wood, who served as mayor between 1855 and 1861, was the first to rise through the ranks of the political machine to that office.

In 1854, Fernando Wood became the first Tammany politician to ascend through the machine ranks to become mayor of New York City. In addition to one term in the U.S. House of Representatives, Wood had amassed a fortune through real estate speculation. William M. Tweed later said of Wood, "I never yet went to get a corner lot that I didn't find Wood had got in ahead of me."

During his first term as mayor, Wood utilized the police force as an auxiliary to his own political gang, the Dead Rabbits. When he defied tradition by running for a second term, he skimmed police salaries to contribute to his campaign fund and ordered them to stand down on election day, allowing the Dead Rabbits to control polling places.

Although Wood won a second term, the voters elected a Republican state government, which reformed the charter to increase the number of elected department heads, establish a separate Metropolitan Police, and shorten Wood's term in office. After riots between his municipal police force and the metropolitan force, as well as between the Dead Rabbits and nativist Bowery Boys, a scandal involving his brother, and the Panic of 1857, Tammany withdrew support for Wood in the 1857 election, and he lost. In response, Wood left (or was expelled from) Tammany and formed a rival society, Mozart Hall, named for its building at Broadway and Bleecker.

Running for a third term in 1859 on a Mozart Hall ticket, Wood won over divided opposition by attacking Tammany as "kid glove, scented, silk stocking, poodle-headed, degenerate aristocracy" and peeling away Irish and German immigrant support. During the 1860s, Mozart Hall remained a force in city politics, particularly in the German community. During the American Civil War, Mozart Hall aligned with the Copperhead faction of the Democratic Party, against Tammany, which supported the war faction. In 1861, Tammany continued to oppose Wood, splitting the Democratic vote and resulting in the election of Republican George Opdyke. After the war ended, Mozart Hall gradually lost influence and disbanded in 1867.

=== Tweed ring (1867–1873) ===
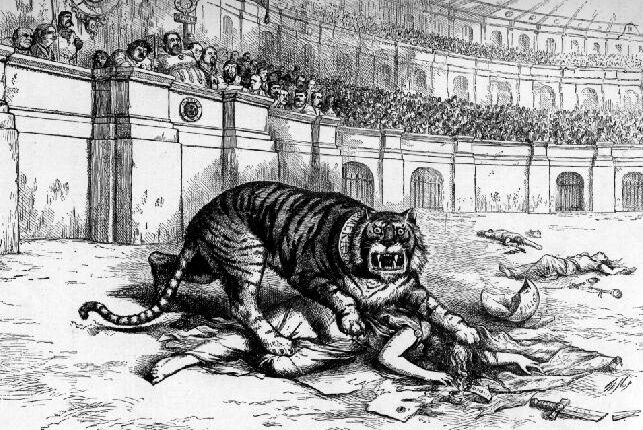
During the reign of Boss Tweed, editorial cartoonist Thomas Nast denounced Tammany as a ferocious tiger mauling the country, personified as Columbia. The tiger became a lasting symbol of Tammany Hall.

After Wood's departure from Tammany Hall in 1858, he was succeeded as grand sachem by William M. Tweed. Over the next decade, Tweed consolidated control over city and state politics considerably while enriching himself beyond any of his predecessors. "Boss" Tweed's rule came to exemplify the corruption of urban political machines and boss rule prior to the Gilded Age, and his conviction for embezzlement was a rallying point for political reform.

Although Tweed was elected to the state senate, his real power came from appointed positions in various branches of the city government. These appointees gave Tweed access to city funds and contractors, thereby controlling public works programs, from which he embezzled funds directly and through more complex racketeering and protection schemes. He also used these programs to provide jobs for the immigrants, especially Irish laborers, who provided Tammany's electoral base. According to Tweed biographer Kenneth D. Ackerman:

It's hard not to admire the skill behind Tweed's system. ... The Tweed ring at its height was an engineering marvel, strong and solid, strategically deployed to control key power points: the courts, the legislature, the treasury and the ballot box. Its frauds had a grandeur of scale and an elegance of structure: money-laundering, profit sharing and organization.

1897 Tammany Tiger by Louis Dalrymple in Puck magazine

Under Tweed's domination, New York City urbanized the Upper East and Upper West Sides of Manhattan, construction of the Brooklyn Bridge began, land was set aside for the Metropolitan Museum of Art, orphanages and almshouses were constructed, and social services expanded to unprecedented levels. Beginning in 1869, John T. Hoffman and A. Oakey Hall, both Tweed proteges, served as governor of the state and mayor of the city, respectively. Through their explicit involvement or implicit permission, Tweed was able to expand his operations into practically every aspect of city and state governance. All of this activity also enriched Tweed and elevated him and his allies to the city's wealthy elite, many of whom also engaged in the graft and corruption. Some elites tolerated the Tweed ring because of Tammany's ability to control the immigrant population, but this reputation was undermined by the sectarian Orange Riots of 1870 and 1871. Following the riots, Harper's Weekly and The New York Times, which was the city's only Republican newspaper, began intensified targeted public campaigns against Tweed. The Harper's campaign was particularly effective in undermining Tweed among illiterate New Yorkers, who made up a large majority of the Tammany base, through the work of editorial cartoonist Thomas Nast.

Tweed's rapid decline began on January 21, 1871, when county auditor James Watson was fatally injured in a sleigh accident. Watson, who kept the books and records of the Tweed ring, died one week later. Although Tweed placed his house under watch and another member of the ring attempted to destroy the records, Watson's successor provided city accounts to his patron, former New York sheriff James O'Brien, who turned them over to The New York Times. The records, which showed enormous frauds doubling the state debt from $50 million to $113 million over two years, reinforced the earlier Times stories. At a September 4 mass meeting at Cooper Union, a committee of seventy prominent New York reformers was appointed to examine the misdeeds of the Tweed ring, and Tammany candidates were defeated in the 1871 city elections. Samuel J. Tilden, who had served on the Committee of Seventy, was elevated to governor as a result of his involvement, and he narrowly lost the contested presidential election of 1876.

In 1872, Tweed was arrested and convicted of corruption. After escaping once, he was recaptured and returned to Ludlow Street Jail, where he died in 1878. Tweed's arrest marked the end of Protestant control of Tammany Hall, which became dependent on leadership from Irish Catholic bosses.

=== Reform era (1872–1888) ===
In response to the Tweed allegations, Tammany elected John Kelly, the former county sheriff, as grand sachem. Kelly was not implicated in the Tweed ring, had a reputation for honesty, and was a devout Catholic related by marriage to archbishop of New York John McCloskey. He removed Tweed associates from the Society and tightened the grand sachem's authority over the Tammany hierarchy. Tammany rebounded rapidly, winning back control of city government in the 1874 elections.

In 1886, Kelly was succeeded by his top lieutenant, Richard Croker. In the mayoral election that year, the United Labor Party, an alliance of labor unions, and its nominee Henry George threatened Tammany's status as the representatives of the urban working class. George initially hesitated to run but was convinced to do so after Tammany covertly offered him a seat in Congress to stay out of the mayoral race. To counter George's appeal, Croker allied with the anti-Tammany "Swallowtail" faction to nominate Abram Hewitt for mayor. Hewitt, the leader of the Swallowtails, was the son-in-law of Peter Cooper and had an impeccable reputation; his nomination effectively reunified the Democratic elite with Tammany. Hewitt went on to defeat George and Republican former state assemblyman Theodore Roosevelt.

Following the 1886 campaign, Croker adopted several United Labor Party innovations, in particular the use of political clubhouses. Because Tammany's ward heelers controlled the city's saloons, the new party had organized via "neighborhood meetings, streetcorner rallies, campaign clubs, Assembly District organizations, and trade legions–an entire political counterculture". Croker established the clubhouses, with one in each Assembly district, to take the place of the saloons and involved women and children by sponsoring family excursions and picnics. Under Croker, Tammany appeared more respectable and less obviously connected to saloons and gangs, and the clubhouses created a more efficient framework for patronage distribution; applicants simply had to volunteer at their local club. The clubs attracted a strong membership of middle-class ethnic voters.

=== Corruption, investigations, and consolidation (1888–1898) ===
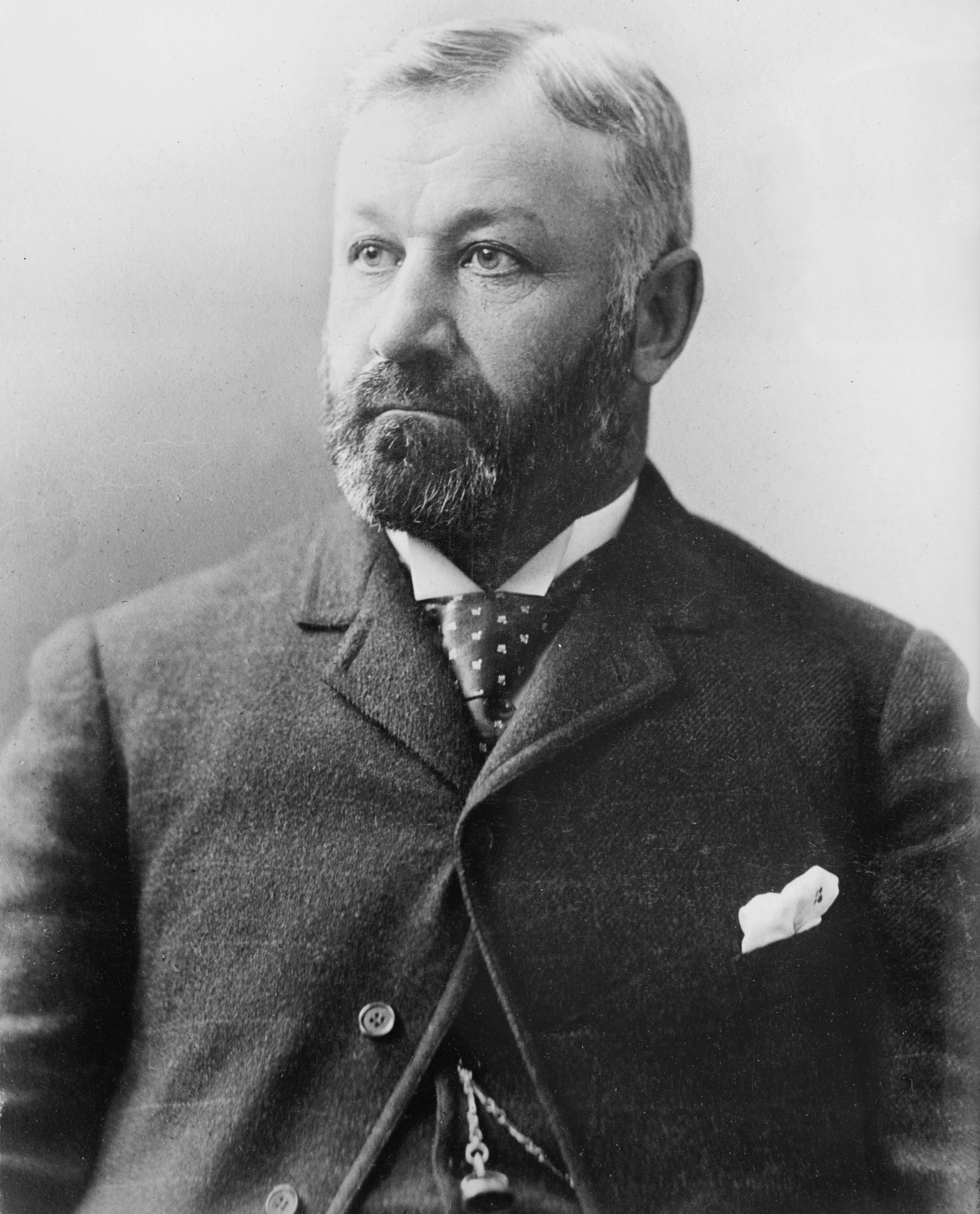
During the 1880s and 1890s, Richard Croker reestablished Tammany as the indisputable political authority in the city and a source of immense political graft and patronage.

In 1888, Tammany abandoned Hewitt, who had alienated the city's Irish population through his nativism and decision not to review a St. Patrick's Day parade and alienated Tammany by granting fewer patronage jobs than expected. Tammany endorsed Hugh J. Grant, who became the first New York-born Irish American mayor. Although Hewitt ran an efficient government, Croker viewed Hewitt as being too self-righteous and did not grant Croker the patronage jobs he was expecting from a mayor. Grant and Croker established a vast patronage network, which continued under Grant's successor, Thomas Francis Gilroy, and included essentially the entire city workforce. By 1890, Croker had unprecedented and uncontested control within New York City.

Croker also developed a new stream of income from the business community. Instead of bribing individual officeholders, businesses paid Tammany directly. The payments were then distributed as necessary. By 1892, Tammany controlled the state legislature in Albany as well. Through his influence in Albany, Croker was careful to maintain a pro-business climate of laissez-faire and low taxes, while mending fences with labor through legislation which addressed union concerns. Republican boss Thomas C. Platt adopted similar methods, meaning that the two men essentially controlled the state between them.

==== State investigations ====
During the 1890s, Tammany once again faced public scrutiny. In a series of three investigations, each supported by Republican boss Thomas C. Platt, the Republican state legislature held public hearings into Tammany corruption. The first of these, in 1890, was chaired by Jacob Sloat Fassett. Although the committee revealed potential bribes involving Croker's hotel business, its hearings resulted in no indictments. Republicans lost the legislative elections in 1890, and Fassett lost his campaign for governor in 1891.

In 1894, a special committee of the state senate, chaired by Clarence Lexow, focused on corruption within the New York City Police Department. This committee was convened after Charles Henry Parkhurst and John Erving conducted undercover investigations into prostitution and corruption and preached against the police and Tammany Hall. As a result of the Lexow investigations, Croker remained in a self-imposed European exile until 1898 and another Committee of Seventy was formed which included Hewitt, J. P. Morgan, Cornelius Vanderbilt II, and Elihu Root, some of the city's richest and most respectable men. In the 1894 election, they supported millionaire dry goods merchant William L. Strong for mayor and forced Tammany's initial candidate, department store magnate Nathan Straus, to withdraw for fear of social ostracization. Strong won the election handily over Hugh J. Grant, whose record as mayor was tarnished by the police investigation, and Republicans swept the state election as well.

A final state investigation began in 1899 at the urging of Theodore Roosevelt, who was elected governor. This investigation was chaired by Republican assemblyman Robert Mazet and led by chief counsel Frank Moss. Moss revealed further details about Croker's corporate alliances, and the hearings yielded memorable quotes from Croker and police chief Bill Devery. The committee also began the first investigations into the ice trust scandal.

==== Consolidation of Greater New York ====
In addition to the election of Strong, reformers pressed for consolidation of New York County (which had absorbed the Bronx) with its surrounding towns. On December 14, 1894, voters in the towns of New York County, Kings County (consisting entirely of the consolidated city of Brooklyn, which had overtaken New York as the largest city in the country), Richmond County (on Staten Island), and Queens County voted to consolidate into one city with a unified municipal government. The immediate impact of consolidation was to dramatically weaken Tammany Hall, which now had to compete with other Democratic Party machines, in particular the Brooklyn machine led by Hugh McLaughlin, and the Republican Party and reform movements, which was far more popular in Brooklyn and the Queens suburbs.

Despite these obstacles, Tammany candidate Robert A. Van Wyck easily won the 1897 consolidation election over Brooklyn reform mayor Seth Low, Republican navy secretary Benjamin F. Tracy, and Henry George, who died shortly before the election. Tammany supporters marched through the city streets chanting, "Well, well, well, Reform has gone to Hell!" After the victory, Croker returned to the United States in 1898 to oppose reformers' efforts to outlaw Sunday drinking and otherwise enforce their own authoritarian moral concepts on immigrant populations with different cultural outlooks.

=== Consolidated city and declining influence (1898–1932) ===
From 1898 to 1945, New York City politics revolved around the conflict between the political machines and reformers. In quiet times, the machines had the advantage of their core of solid supporters, and they exercised control of city and borough affairs and played a major role in the state legislature. In times of crisis, however, particularly the Great Depression, reformers took control of key offices, notably the mayor's office. The reformers were never unified; they operated through a complex network of independent civic organizations, each focused on its own particular agenda. Their membership generally consisted of civic-minded, educated middle-class men and women, usually with expert skills in a profession or business, who deeply distrusted the machines as corrupt.

Rather than establishing one citywide Democratic machine, separate organizations flourished in each of the boroughs, with Tammany Hall remaining the most prominent of the five. The other machines had similar structures to Tammany, with local clubs and a single boss. Republican local organizations were much weaker, but they played key roles in forming reform coalitions. Most of the time they looked to Albany and Washington for their sphere of influence.

==== Murphy era (1902–1924) ====
In 1901, Seth Low defeated Van Wyck, whose administration was tarnished by the ice trust scandal, and Croker resigned as boss. His chosen successor, Lewis Nixon of Staten Island, resigned within months as well, explaining "I find that I cannot retain my self-respect and remain the leader of the Tammany organization."

From 1902 until his death in 1924, Tammany was led by Charles Francis Murphy, with Timothy Sullivan leading the organization in the Bowery and serving for many of the early years as their spokesman in the legislature and Congress. Murphy's tenure restored some degree of respectability to Tammany and extended its influence in national politics, culminating in the nomination of Al Smith for president of the United States at the 1928 Democratic National Convention. Murphy sponsored a number of working class reform movements through Smith, who served as governor between 1919 and 1928, and Robert F. Wagner. According to Edward J. Flynn, Murphy advised Tammany politicians to avoid involvement in gambling, prostitution, the police department, or the public school system.

In 1903, Murphy successfully engineered the election of George B. McClellan Jr. as mayor. Under Murphy and McClellan, Tammany faced a stern, independent challenge from William Randolph Hearst, the wealthy and ambitious publisher of The New York Journal. While Tammany supported Hearst's election to Congress in 1902 and his unsuccessful campaign for governor in 1906, he broke with the organization to challenge McClellan in 1907 on a platform calling for public ownership of municipal utility corporations. The bitter and spirited 1907 campaign resulted in a narrow victory for McClellan and accusations of electoral fraud by Hearst. Thereafter, Hearst had a contentious relationship with Tammany, competing and compromising with the machine on nominations. Hearst managed to dominate Tammany mayor John F. Hylan from 1917 to 1925, but he lost control when Smith and Wagner denied Hylan renomination in 1925 in favor of Jimmy Walker. Hearst then moved back to his native California.

==== Walker mayoralty and the Seabury Commission (1925–1932) ====
After Murphy's death in 1924, Tammany began a long period of declining influence. Murphy was succeeded by George Washington Olvany, the first boss to have received a college education. Olvany exercised loose control of the machine, and familiar corruption schemes returned under the Jimmy Walker mayoralty.

In 1928, Franklin D. Roosevelt was elected governor. Though Roosevelt had allied with Smith, he had opposed Tammany influence as a reformist state legislator and appointed Bronx boss Edward J. Flynn as Secretary of State against Tammany advice. The 1929 stock market crash and increasing press attention on organized crime during Prohibition brought further difficulties, and Olvany resigned in 1929. John F. Curry defeated Eddy Ahearn for the leadership, and Curry proceeded to make a series of poor decisions. Under increasing scrutiny from the press and an investigation by U.S. attorney Charles H. Tuttle, several New York judges were implicated in involvement with organized crime figures, including Arnold Rothstein, and embezzlement, racketeering, and bribery schemes. In August 1930, state judge and Upper West Side Tammany leader Joseph Force Crater disappeared. Roosevelt and the state legislature launched three investigations into judicial and police corruption, chaired by Samuel H. Hofstadter and led by Samuel Seabury. The Seabury investigations resulted in the dismissals of several Tammany judges and officials, indictments of Tammany figures, and the resignation of Jimmy Walker.

=== La Guardia reforms (1933–1945) ===
In 1932, the Tammany machine suffered a further setback when Roosevelt was elected president of the United States. Curry and Brooklyn boss John H. McCooey had supported Al Smith at the 1932 Democratic National Convention, and Roosevelt and James Farley stripped Tammany of its federal patronage privileges in favor of Flynn. Roosevelt also recruited Joseph V. McKee to run for mayor against the Tammany candidate, John P. O'Brien, in 1933. After withdrawing his support for McKee, Roosevelt complied in the election of Republican and Fusion nominee Fiorello La Guardia, effectively removing even more patronage from Tammany control.

As mayor, LaGuardia reorganized the city government with non-partisan officials and sought to develop a clean and honest city government. When Tammany alderman Alford Williams died in December 1933, the Board of Aldermen defied leadership to elect a La Guardia ally as his successor. The shock from these defections caused Tammany ally Augustus Pierce to collapse and die of a heart attack in the aldermanic chambers. When McCooey died less than a week later, Curry was left with few allies in the city, state, or federal government.

In 1936, La Guardia successfully led the adoption of a new city charter which mandated proportional representation method of electing members of the City Council, thereby abolishing the ward system which formed the basis of political machine organizations in the city, and subordinated the new 26-member City Council to the Board of Estimate. La Guardia filled the city's appointive offices, and the power of Tammany Hall was reduced to a shadow of its former grandeur. La Guardia also greatly increased the number of city jobs subject to civil service examinations. Roughly three-quarters of city positions required job seekers to take an exam in 1939, compared to only about half in 1933. In 1937, La Guardia defeated Jeremiah T. Mahoney to become the first anti-Tammany mayor to win re-election He was re-elected again in 1941. His long reform tenure weakened Tammany in a way that previous reform mayors had not.

==== Criminal investigations and prosecutions ====
During Prohibition, the traditional street gangs Tammany Hall had relied on were replaced by modern organized crime syndicates enriched by bootlegging. Tammany came to depend on criminal bosses, such as Arnold Rothstein, to maintain some measure of street control. Rothstein's murder in 1928 weakened Tammany.

In 1935, Governor Herbert H. Lehman appointed Thomas E. Dewey as special prosecutor. Dewey obtained the conviction of Lucky Luciano, a powerful mob figure and strong Tammany ally. While Luciano maintained control of his criminal organization from prison until his deportation to Italy in 1946, his conviction gave Dewey the prestige necessary to win election as Manhattan District Attorney and prosecute the political allies of organized crime, particularly within Tammany Hall. In 1939, Dewey prosecuted and secured the conviction of longtime Tammany leader Jimmy Hines on bribery charges. The Dewey prosecutions and the imprisonment of Hines weakened the machine's power in the criminal underworld. Dewey went on to win three terms as Governor of New York from 1943 through 1954 and nominations for president in 1944 and 1948 on the basis of his record as a crusading prosecutor.

In 1943, Dewey's successor Frank Hogan released a transcript of a recorded phone message between mob boss Frank Costello and Thomas Aurelio, a Tammany associate running for the New York Supreme Court, in which Aurelio pledged undying loyalty to Costello. When Costello was called as a witness in disbarment proceedings against Aurelio, he freely admitted that he had secured Aurelio's nomination and the election of Michael Kennedy as grand sachem of Tammany Hall. While Aurelio avoided disbarment and even won re-election, Kennedy resigned his position within Tammany in January 1944.

=== Final years (1945–1967) ===
==== O'Dwyer mayoralty (1945–1950) and 1950 police corruption scandal ====
In 1941 and 1945, Frank Costello and Tammany Hall supported Brooklyn District Attorney William O'Dwyer for mayor. He lost the 1941 election to La Guardia but won in 1945. O'Dwyer was reelected in 1949, but the following year, a national bribery and gambling scandal implicated O'Dwyer, Costello, and the New York City Police Department. The scandal led to the resignations of hundreds of officers accused of protecting gambling operations and the replacement of all 336 members of the plainclothes division of the New York City Police Department. O'Dwyer resigned on the pretense of an appointment as U.S. ambassador to Mexico by President Harry S. Truman. In the meantime, young lawyers and other reform-minded Democrats founded the Lexington Democratic Club on the Upper East Side in 1949, after being denied access to Tammany Hall politics by the old guard.

The police scandal contributed to the establishment of the Kefauver Committee, a United States Senate investigation into organized crime. Though the hearings did not directly impact Tammany, they reinforced its apparent connection to organized crime. O'Dwyer returned to testify but was unable to offer a persuasive explanation for his visit to Costello's apartment in 1941, when he first sought Tammany support in his campaign for mayor. Following the conviction of a close association on bribery charges, O'Dwyer resigned as ambassador.

==== DeSapio years (1949–1961) and dissolution (1967) ====
Tammany never fully recovered from scandals of the O'Dwyer administration, but it staged a small comeback under the leadership of Carmine DeSapio, its first Italian-American boss, who reestablished boss rule. Unlike his predecessors, however, DeSapio publicly promoted himself as a transparent reformer and made his political decisions known to the press. DeSapio also diversified Tammany membership and leadership, including non-white and non-Catholic politicians. In 1953, he successfully engineered the election of Robert F. Wagner Jr. as mayor over incumbent Vincent Impellitteri, elevating him to the status of kingmaker. In 1954, he supported W. Averell Harriman for the nomination for governor over Franklin D. Roosevelt Jr. After convincing Roosevelt to accept a nomination for attorney general as a consolation prize, DeSapio successfully blocked his election while securing election for Harriman.

Despite these electoral successes, DeSapio could not escape his close ties with Costello, who was convicted of tax evasion in 1954. During DeSapio's reign, Costello continued to influence Tammany officials from prison. Following an assassination attempt in 1957, Costello conceded authority over organized crime to Vito Genovese, leaving DeSapio without a patron. In 1958, DeSapio's reform image and political standing were permanently compromised after Harriman and Frank Hogan, his preferred candidate for United States Senate, were defeated by Republicans in an otherwise extremely strong year for the national Democratic Party.

In 1961, Wagner was re-elected by denouncing DeSapio and Tammany machine politics. DeSapio opponents including Eleanor Roosevelt, former governor Herbert H. Lehman, and Thomas K. Finletter formed the New York Committee for Democratic Voters and the group helped oust DeSapio as district leader in Greenwich Village, a post he had held for two decades. The once mighty Tammany political machine, now deprived of leadership, quickly faded from political importance. In 1963 and 1965, DeSapio unsuccessfully ran for Democratic district leader but was defeated by Ed Koch, leader of the Village Independent Democrats. By 1967, Tammany Hall had ceased to exist.

== Legacy ==
Like other urban political machines, Tammany served as a rudimentary public welfare system in the era before the New Deal by providing poor and immigrant New Yorkers with extralegal services. According to one legendary claim, during the course of a single day, Tammany figure George Washington Plunkitt assisted the victims of a house fire, secured the release of six drunks, paid the rent of a poor family and gave them money for food, secured employment for four individuals, attended the funerals of two constituents, attended a Bar Mitzvah, and attended the wedding of a Jewish couple from his ward.

Tammany Hall also served as a social integrator for immigrants by familiarizing them with American society and its political institutions and by assisting them in becoming naturalized citizens. One example was the naturalization process organized by William M. Tweed. Under Tweed's regime, "naturalization committees" were established, made up primarily of Tammany politicians and employees. Their duties consisted of filling out paperwork, providing witnesses, and lending immigrants money for the fees required to become citizens. Judges and other city officials were bribed and otherwise compelled to go along with the workings of these committees. In exchange for all these benefits, immigrants assured Tammany Hall they would vote for their candidates.

== List of Tammany Hall bosses ==
It can be difficult to identify a single leader of the Tammany organization, as the Tammany Society and its political machine operated as separate but coordinated entities. In many periods, the public face and spokesperson of the organization may not have wielded actual political power commensurate with prior leaders. During certain periods of transition or instability, power was shared between two or more individuals.

- 1797–1804 – Aaron Burr
- 1804–1814 – Teunis Wortmann
- 1814–1817 – George Buckmaster
- 1817–1822 – Jacob Barker
- 1822–1827 – Stephen Allen
- 1827–1828 – Mordecai M. Noah
- 1828–1835 – Walter Bowne
- 1835–1842 – Isaac Varian
- 1842–1848 – Robert Morris
- 1848–1850 – Isaac Vanderbeck Fowler
- 1850–1856 – Fernando Wood
- 1857–1858 – Isaac Vanderbeck Fowler
- 1858 – Fernando Wood
- 1858–1871 – William M. Tweed (Note: From 1858 to 1859, Tweed shared power with Isaac Vanderbeck Fowler, and from 1859 to 1867, he shared power with Richard B. Connolly.)
- 1872–1886 – John Kelly (Note: During 1872, Kelly shared power with John Morrissey.)
- 1886–1902 – Richard Croker
- 1902 – Lewis Nixon
- 1902–1924 – Charles Francis Murphy (Note: In 1902, Murphy shared power with Daniel F. McMahon and Louis F. Haffen)
- 1924–1929 – George Washington Olvany
- 1929–1934 – John F. Curry
- 1934–1937 – James J. Dooling (Note: When Dooling was ill in 1936, he was supplanted by a triumvirate of James A. Farley, Edward J. Flynn and Frank Kelly)
- 1937–1942 – Christopher D. Sullivan
- 1942 – Charles H. Hussey
- 1942–1944 – Michael J. Kennedy
- 1944–1947 – Edward V. Loughlin
- 1947–1948 – Frank J. Sampson
- 1948–1949 – Hugo E. Rogers
- 1949–1962 – Carmine DeSapio
- 1962–1964 – Edward N. Costikyan (as chair of the New York Democratic Committee)
- 1964–1967 – J. Raymond Jones

== Headquarters ==
=== Early locations ===
In its very early days, the Tammany Society met in the back rooms of various taverns, most often in Barden's Tavern on Broadway, near Bowling Green. These back rooms served as unofficial campaign headquarters on election days. In 1791, the society opened a museum designed to collect artifacts relating to the events and history of the United States. Originally presented in an upper room of City Hall, it moved to the Merchant's Exchange when that proved to be too small. The museum was unsuccessful, and the Society severed its connections with it in 1795.

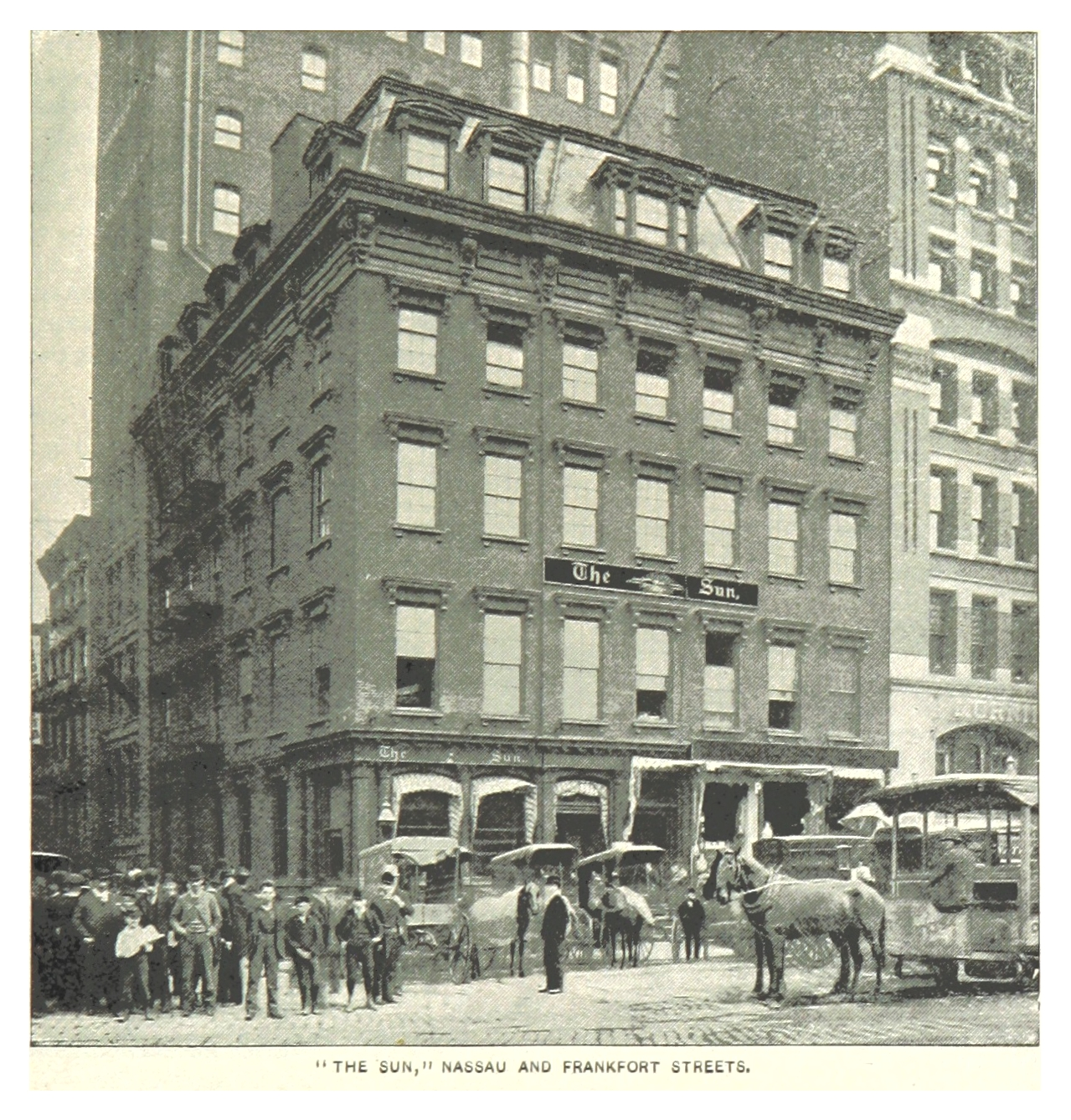
170 Nassau Street in 1893

In 1798, the Society moved to more permanent and spacious quarters in the "Long Room" of Martling's Tavern, at Nassau Street and Spruce Street, near where New York City Hall is today. The Tammany Society controlled the space, which it dubbed "The Wigwam", and let other responsible political organizations it approved of use the room for meetings. This space became commonly known as "Tammany Hall".

Their new headquarters had limitations as well as advantages. In 1812, Tammany moved again, to a new five-story, $55,000 building it built at the corner of Nassau and Frankfort, just a few blocks away. The new Tammany Hall had a large room that could accommodate up to 2,000 people for political and social events, and the rest of the building was run as a hotel. The Society was to remain there for 55 years.

=== 14th Street headquarters (1868–1927) ===
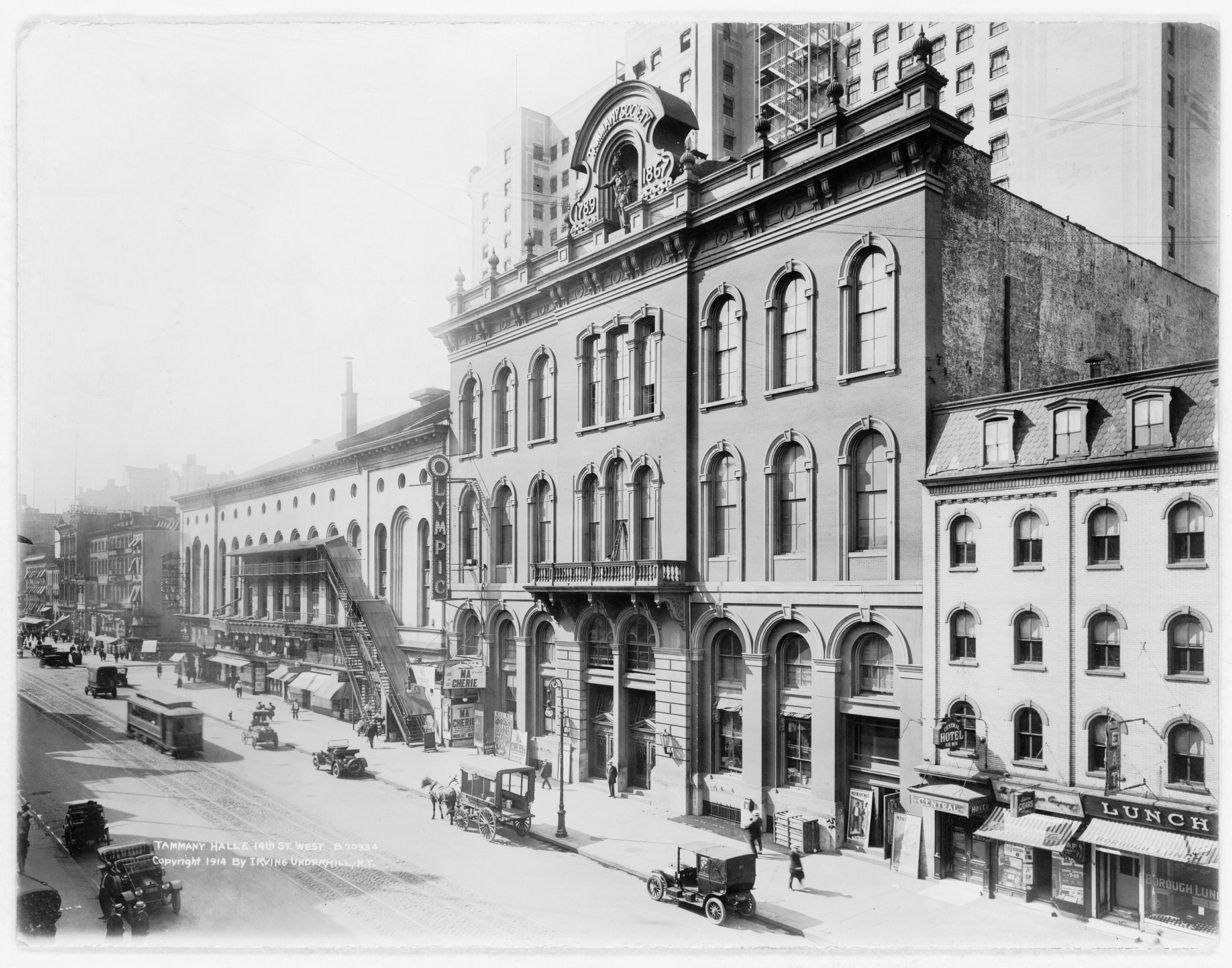
Tammany Hall on East 14th Street between Third Avenue and Irving Place in Manhattan, New York City (1914). The building was demolished c. 1927.

By the 1860s, under William M. Tweed, Tammany had greater influence and wealth, so new headquarters was deemed desirable. The cornerstone for a new headquarters was laid on July 14, 1867, at 141 East 14th Street, between Third Avenue and Fourth Avenue. The building at Nassau and Frankfort was sold to Charles Dana and his friends, who relocated The New York Sun newspaper to that location.

When Tammany leaders found that they needed $25,000 more in funds, a meeting was held, at which $175,000 was immediately pledged. The new building was completed in 1868. According to Edwin G. Burrows and Mike Wallace in Gotham: A History of New York City to 1898, the new headquarters "merged politics and entertainment, already stylistically similar" into one building.

The Tammany Society kept only one room for itself, renting the rest to entertainment impresarios: Don Bryant's Minstrels, a German theater company, classical concerts and opera. The basement–in the French mode–offered the Café Ausant, where one could see tableaux vivant, gymnastic exhibitions, pantomimes, and Punch and Judy shows. There was also a bar, a bazaar, a Ladies' Cafe, and an oyster saloon. All this–with the exception of Bryant's–was open from seven till midnight for a combination price of fifty cents.

The building had an auditorium big enough to hold public meetings, and a smaller one that became Tony Pastor's Music Hall, which was used as an early venue for the early development of vaudeville. The structure was topped off by a large-than-life statue of Saint Tammany.

=== 44 Union Square (1927–1943) ===
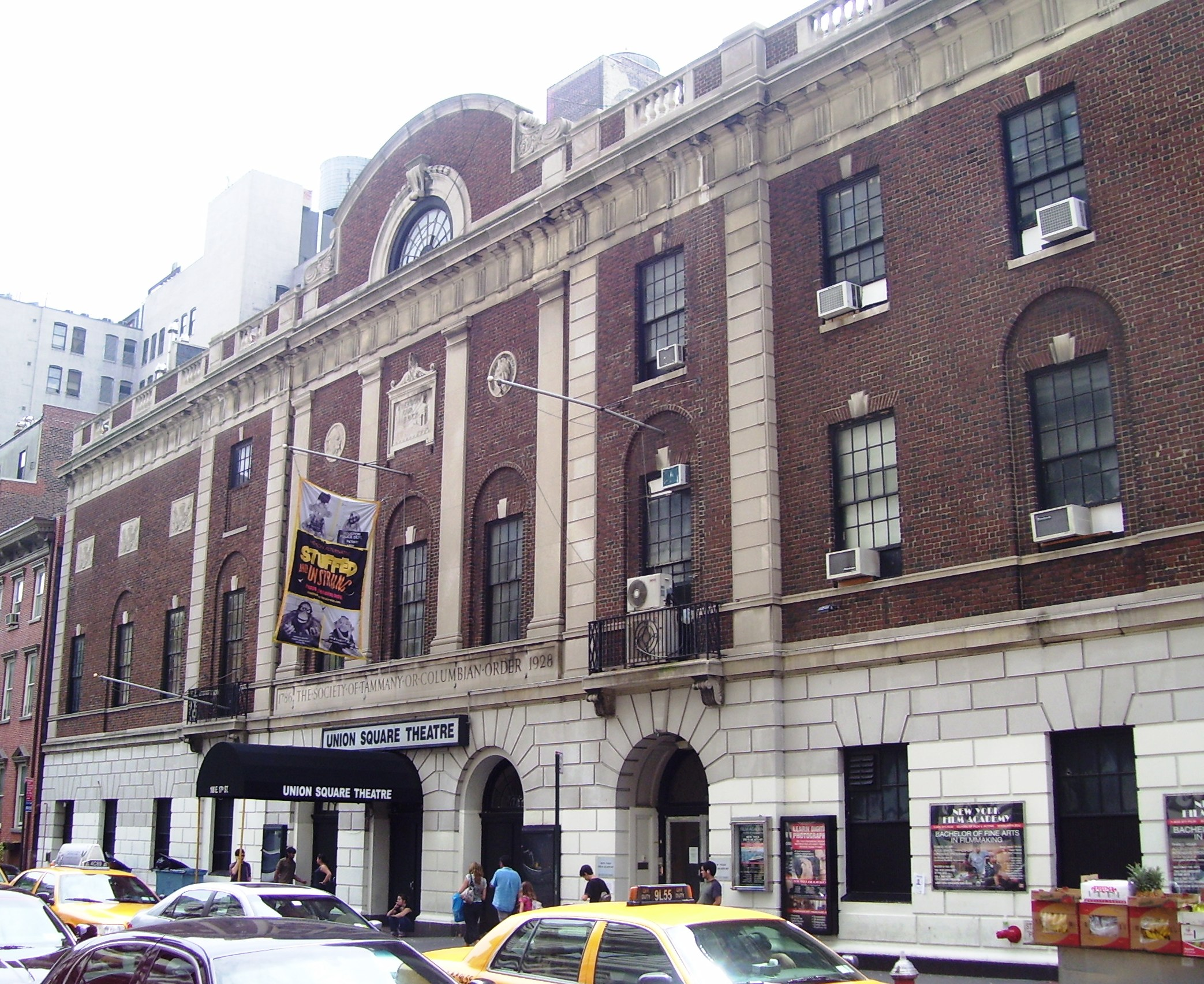
44 Union Square, the former Tammany Hall building at 17th Street and Park Avenue South, across from Union Square, housed a theatre and a film school until renovations commenced in 2016.

In 1927 the building on 14th Street was sold, to make way for the new tower being added to the Consolidated Edison Building. The Society's new building at 44 Union Square, a few blocks north at the corner with East 17th Street, was finished and occupied by 1929. When Tammany started to lose its political influence, and its all-important access to graft, it could no longer afford to maintain the 17th Street building, and in 1943 it was bought by a local affiliate of the International Ladies Garment Workers Union. Tammany left, and its leaders moved to the National Democratic Club on Madison Avenue at East 37th Street, and the Society's collection of memorabilia went into a warehouse in the Bronx.

The building at 44 Union Square housed the New York Film Academy and the Union Square Theatre, and retail stores at street level, until a complete renovation of the building began in 2016. The New York City Landmarks Preservation Commission designated it in October 2013. The renovation, which included a gutting of the interior and the installation of a glass-domed roof, was substantially completed by July 2020. The design of the roof, by BKSK Architects, symbolizes a turtle, from the Lenape creation story.

== See also ==
- History of New York City (1855–1897)
- History of New York City (1898–1945)
- History of New York City (1946–1977)
- Harlem Clubhouse
- Ice trust scandal
- Murray Hall (politician)
