= Tammanies =

American social societies

The Tammanies or Tammany Societies were American social societies named for the 17th-century Delaware chief Tamanend or Tammany, revered for his wisdom. Tammany Society members also called him St. Tammany, the Patron Saint of America.

Tammanies are remembered today for New York City's Tammany Hall—also popularly known as the Great Wigwam—but such societies were not limited to New York, with Tammany Societies in several locations in the colonies, and later, the young country. According to the Handbook of Indians North of Mexico:

...it appears that the Philadelphia society, which was probably the first bearing the name, and is claimed as the original of the Red Men secret order, was organized May 1, 1772, under the title of Sons of King Tammany, with strongly Loyalist tendency. It is probable that the "Saint Tammany" society was a later organization of revolutionary sympathizers opposed to the kingly idea. Saint Tammany parish, La., preserves the memory. The practice of organizing American political and military societies on an Indian basis dates back to the French and Indian War, and was especially in favor among the soldiers of the revolutionary army, most of whom were frontiersmen more or less familiar with Indian life and custom...

The society occasionally at first known as the Columbian Order took an Indian title and formulated for itself a ritual based upon supposedly Indian custom. Thus, the name chosen was that of the traditional Delaware chief; the meeting place was called the "wigwam"; there were 13 "tribes" or branches corresponding to the 13 original states, the New York parent organization being the "Eagle Tribe," New Hampshire the "Otter Tribe," Delaware the "Tiger Tribe," whence the famous "Tammany tiger," etc. The principal officer of each tribe was styled the "sachem," and the head of the whole organization was designated the kitchi okeemaw, or grand sachem, which office was held by Mooney himself for more than 20 years. Subordinate officers also were designated by other Indian titles, records were kept according to the Indian system by moons and seasons, and at the regular meetings the members attended in semi-Indian costume...

The implied purpose of the Tammany Societies was to delight in all things Native American, including titles, seasons, rituals, language and apparel, as illustrated by a 1832 notice of a meeting of Wigwam No. 9 in Hamilton, Ohio:

NOTICE.--The members of the Tammany Society No. 9 will meet at their wigwam at the house of brother William MURRAY, in Hamilton, on Thursday, the first of the month of heats, precisely at the going down of the sun. Punctual attendance is requested.
"By order of the Great Sachem. "

The ninth of the month of flowers, year of discovery 323. William C. KEEN, Secretary
