= 1856 New York City mayoral election =

- November 4, 1856
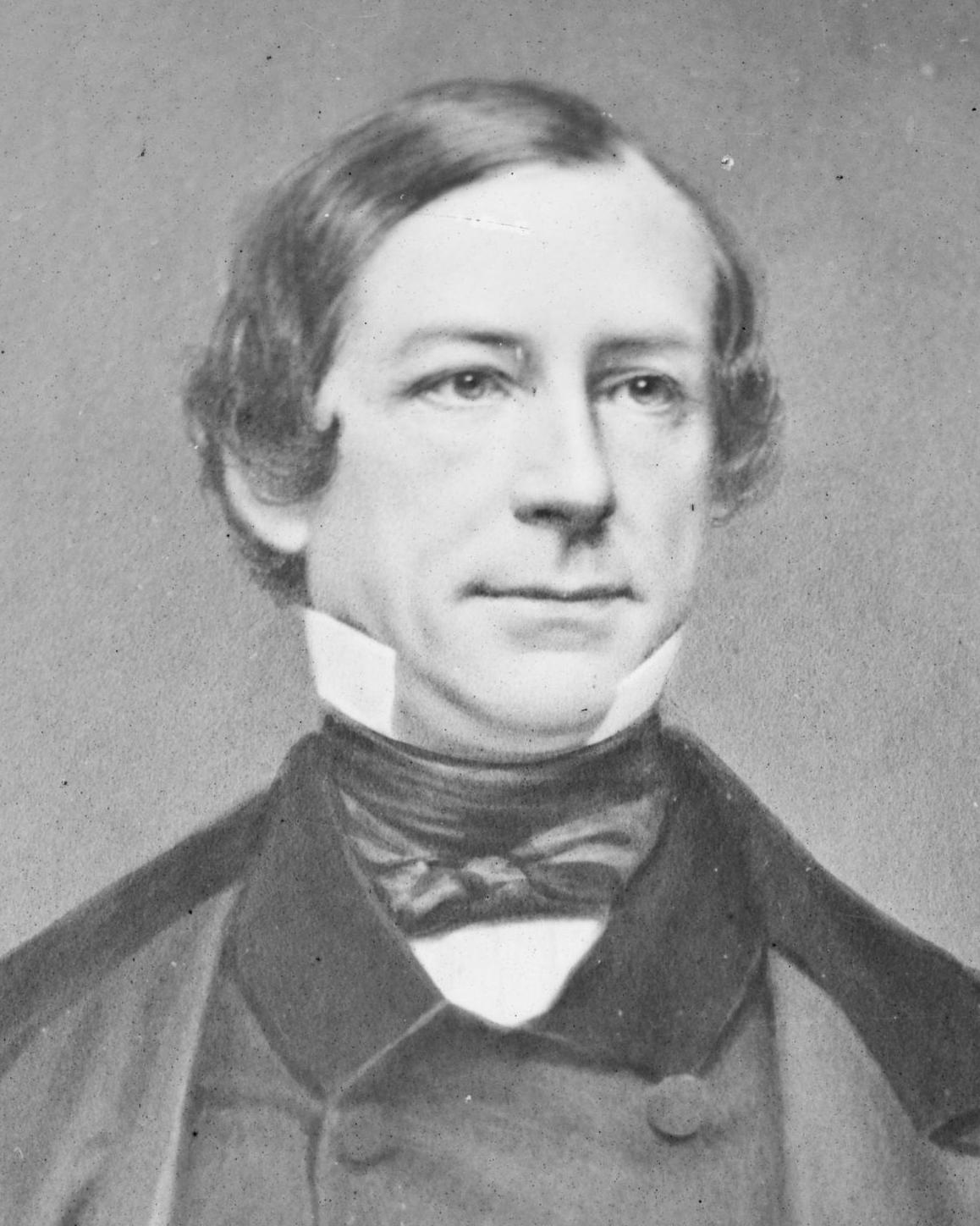

Nominee	Fernando Wood	Isaac O. Barker
Party	Democratic	Know Nothing
Popular vote	34,566	25,182
Percentage	44.5%	32.4%
Nominee	Anthony J. Bleecker	James S. Libby
Party	Republican	Independent Democratic
Popular vote	9,671	4,684
Percentage	12.4%	6.0%
Mayor before election
Fernando Wood
Democratic
Elected mayor
Fernando Wood
Democratic

An election for Mayor of New York City was held on November 4, 1856.

Incumbent mayor Fernando Wood re-elected to a second term in office in a four-way race. He defeated American Party nominee Isaac O. Barker, Republican Anthony J. Bleecker, and Whig nominee John J. Herrick. Although Wood was easily re-elected by an increased plurality over his 1854 performance, he ran behind presidential candidate James Buchanan and failed to win support for his reform proposals on the Common Council. The election realigned the city's political factions, which had been divided over the issue of slavery, into personal supporters and opponents of Wood.

== Background ==
During his first term in office, Wood sought to strengthen the power of the mayoralty and sought conflict with the state government in Albany. Using a populist approach, he instituted public health reforms and took a moderate or selective approach on prosecuting vice.

Wood attacked the city charter in his inaugural address as an "ill-shaped monster" which prevented home rule and obstructed city government from "aiding the many without threatening the few". He criticized the New York Legislature for blocking charter reform and unsuccessfully sought reform through the state court system, increasing his popularity within the city.

Wood also increased his control over the New York Police Department, preferring foreign-born Democrats in hiring.

=== 1856 gubernatorial campaign ===
As mayor, Wood's power over Tammany Hall was nearly absolute, and he became a kingmaker in the 1856 presidential election. He supported James Buchanan and befriended Buchanan's unofficial campaign manager, Daniel Sickles. When Buchanan visited New York, Wood hosted major Democratic fundraisers for his campaign. Buchanan ultimately emerged victorious at the 1856 Convention, elevating Wood on the state and national stage.

In advance of the July state convention, Wood presented himself as a candidate for governor and hoped Buchanan would reciprocate his support. However, opposition to Wood among Hard Shell Democrats and some Soft Shells outside of New York City was strong. Soft leaders Dean Richmond and Horatio Seymour favored Addison Gardiner or Amasa J. Parker, both moderates who could unify with the Hards, for the nomination. Despite Sickles's pleas, Buchanan declined to intervene. The Softs and Hards met in separate conventions at Syracuse, with Sickles and John Kelly managing the Wood campaign at both. Wood ultimately withdrew from the Soft convention in favor of Parker, who was then ratified as the Hard nominee.

== Democratic nomination ==
After losing the nomination for governor, Wood refocused on city politics and announced his campaign for another term as mayor, claiming—but not proving—support from Buchanan. Wood publicly claimed his frustration with the city charter drove him to prefer retirement but also presented an open letter from nearly one hundred city businessmen begging him to run. Using his position in Tammany Hall, Wood ensured that the city convention gave him a majority. Dissident Hards and some Softs endorsed James Libby.

== General election ==
=== Candidates ===
- Isaac O. Barker (American)
- Anthony J. Bleecker (Republican)
- James S. Libby (Hard Shell Democratic)
- James R. Whiting, justice of the New York Supreme Court (Reform Democratic)
- Fernando Wood, incumbent mayor since 1855 (Democratic)

=== Campaign ===
The campaign was marked by personal attacks and violent street battles between the various city gangs. A major issue was made of Wood's appointment practices. On election day, Wood released or furloughed some New York Police Department patrolmen to give his own gangs free rein to harass voters and obstruct vote counts.

=== Results ===
Wood won with 44.6% of the vote against Barker's 32.2% and Bleeker with 12.3%. Later investigations into Wood's electioneering failed to produce an indictment on the grounds that such practices were common in the city. Wood maintained his reliance on immigrant wards, but ran well behind Buchanan's majority of 53.1% in the city and failed to capture the Common Council. The 1856 elections were a major defeat for Wood-aligned candidates and marked an end to any crusade for reform. His opponents maintained their majority on the Common Council and only one Soft Shell Democrat, Wood rival Lorenzo B. Shepard, was elected to city office.

Republicans remained in command of the state legislature and won the governorship as well.

1856 New York City mayoral election
Party	Candidate	Votes	%
Democratic	Fernando Wood (incumbent)	34,566	44.46%
Know Nothing	Isaac O. Barker	25,182	32.39%
Republican	Anthony J. Bleecker	9,671	12.44%
Independent Democratic	James S. Libby	4,684	6.03%
Reform Democratic	James R. Whiting	3,638	4.68%
Total votes		121,741	100.00%

=== Results by wards ===
Results by wards
Ward	Wood Democratic		Barker American		Bleecker Republican		Libby Ind. Dem		Whiting Reform		Total
Ward	Votes	%	Votes	%	Votes	%	Votes	%	Votes	%	Votes
1	1,155	66.69%	286	16.51%	44	2.54%	234	13.51%	13	0.75%	1,732
2	279	35.68%	311	39.77%	93	11.89%	76	9.72%	23	2.94%	782
3	420	32.43%	541	41.78%	231	17.84%	70	5.40%	33	2.55%	1,295
4	1,900	%	264	%	130	%	274	%	53	%	
5	1,108	%	1,155	%	443	%	315	%	141	%	
6	2,107	%	279	%	154	%	198	%	93	%	
7	2,029	%	1,385	%	527	%	253	%	173	%	
8	1,471	%	1,623	%	483	%	184	%	277	%	
9	1,180	%	2,731	%	854	%	441	%	404	%	
10	1,512	%	1,336	%	292	%	166	%	152	%	
11	3,158	%	1,555	%	462	%	211	%	93	%	
12	790	%	525	%	264	%	54	%	61	%	
13	1,718	%	1,289	%	330	%	120	%	81	%	
14	2,104	%	347	%	209	%	138	%	182	%	
15	717	%	1,470	%	854	%	251	%	408	%	
16	1,693	%	1,940	%	918	%	277	%	291	%	
17	3,237	%	1,822	%	687	%	258	%	298	%	
18	2,003	%	1,622	%	760	%	227	%	397	%	5,009
19	1,014	47.10%	678	31.49%	270	12.54%	180	8.36%	11	0.51%	2,153
20	2,140	39.40%	1,698	31.27%	886	16.31%	494	9.10%	213	3.92%	5,431
21	1,144	35.76%	1,217	38.04%	434	13.57%	201	6.28%	203	6.35%	3,199
22	1,686	55.66%	898	29.65%	345	11.39%	62	2.05%	38	1.25%	3,029
Totals	34,566	%		%	9,671	%	4,684	%	3,638	%	
