= 1859 New York City mayoral election =

- December 6, 1859
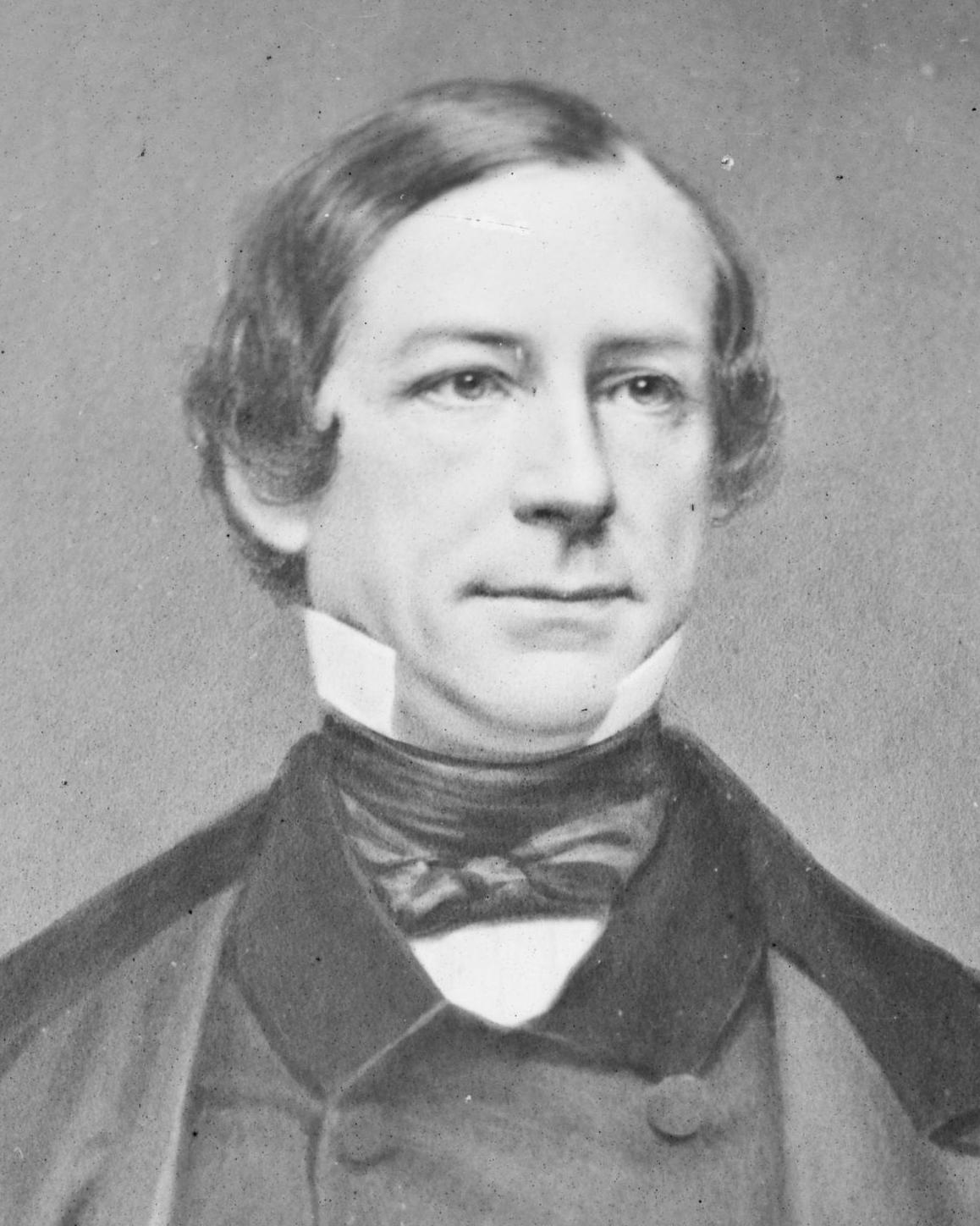

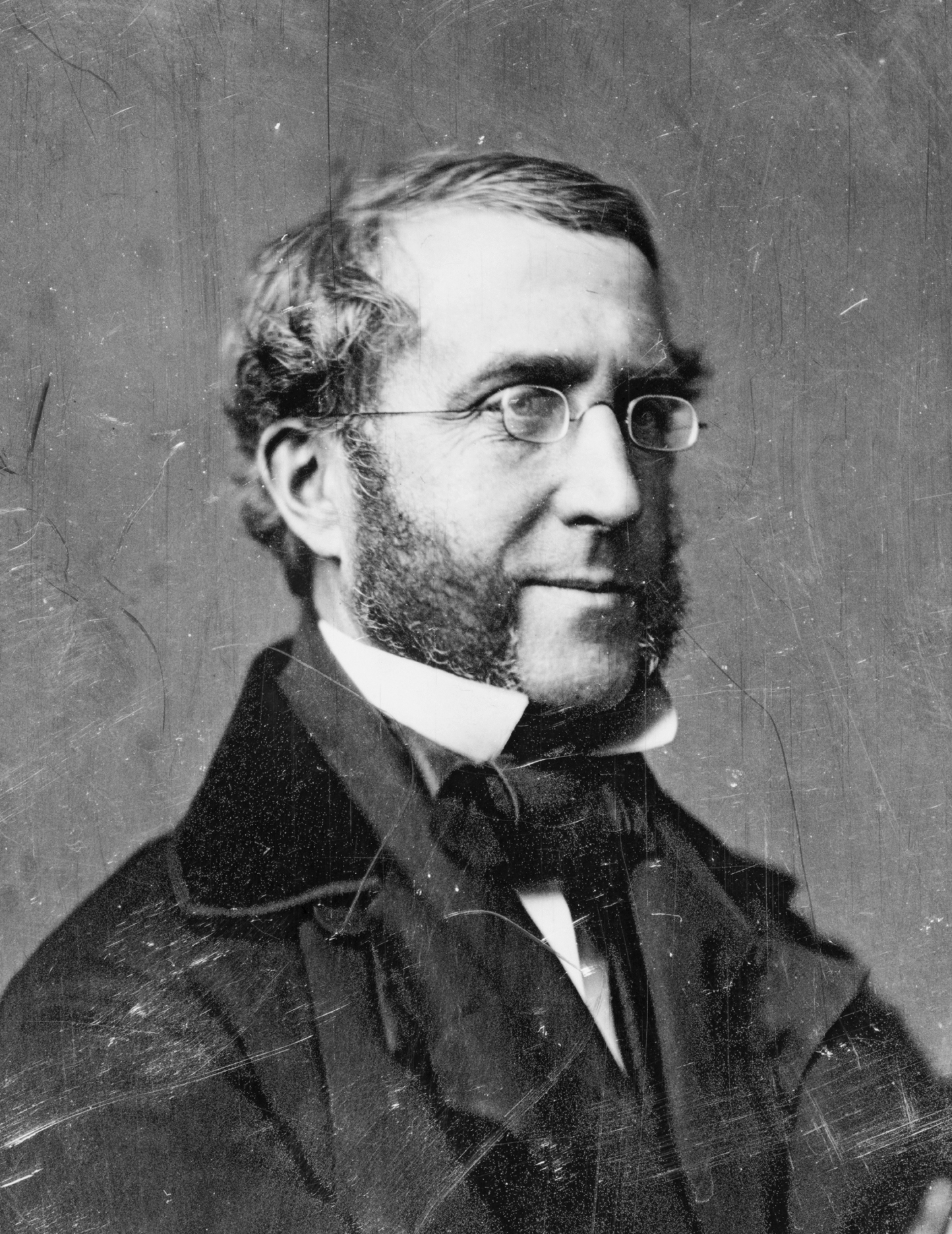

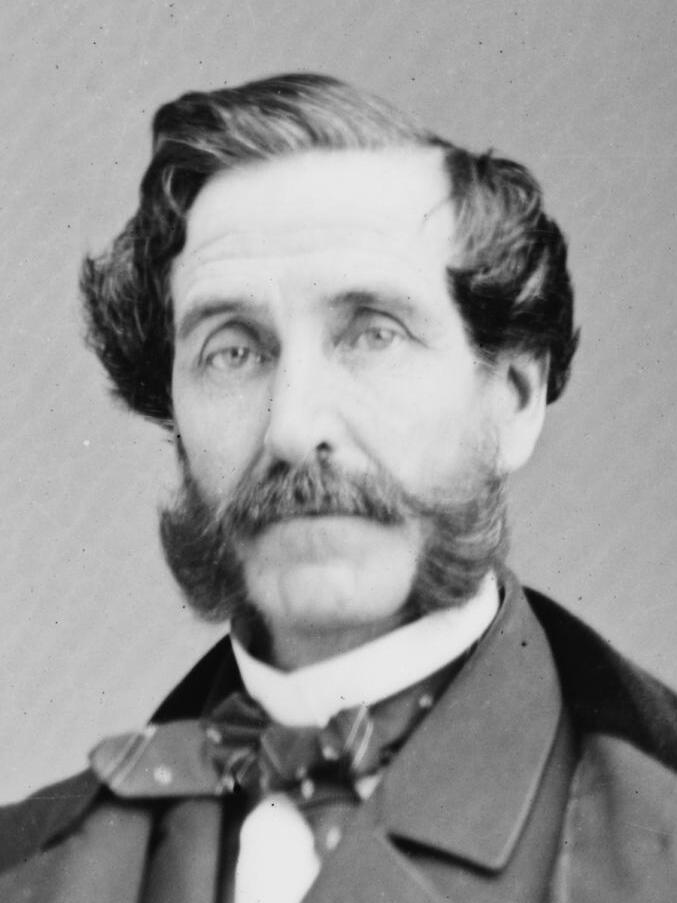
Nominee	Fernando Wood	William F. Havemeyer	George Opdyke
Party	Independent Democratic	Democratic	Republican
Alliance	Mozart Hall	Tammany Hall
Popular vote	29,940	26,913	21,417
Percentage	38.3%	34.4%	27.4%
Mayor before election
Daniel F. Tiemann
Democratic
Elected mayor
Fernando Wood
Democratic

An election for Mayor of New York City was held on December 6, 1859.

Incumbent mayor Daniel F. Tiemann was not a candidate for re-election. Former mayor Fernando Wood, running on a "Mozart Hall" Democratic ticket in opposition to his former Tammany Hall allies, won a three-way race to succeed him, defeating William F. Havemeyer and Republican George Opdyke.

== Background ==
Following his defeat in the 1857 election, which saw him defeated by an alliance of Republicans, Know-Nothings, and former Tammany Hall supporters, Fernando Wood was declared politically dead.

In 1857, Wood purchased the New York Daily News for $5,600 and later installed his brother, Benjamin, as editor. He used the paper as his personal bulletin, boosting his own populist platform and haranguing opponents and enemies.

== Democratic nominations ==
=== Background ===
In the April 1857 Tammany elections, Wood campaigned for control of the organization but lost by a margin of two to one; his supporters blamed the enrollment of secret "Black Republicans" and Wood left Tammany Hall. He founded a "Democratic Society of Regulators" with membership open to any New York City Democrat. Wood's organization came to be called the "Mozart Hall Democrats", after the hotel where they met at the corner of Bond Street and Broadway. The society was composed largely of immigrants, workers, and the poor.

Wood spent much of 1858 and 1859 trying to play various presidential candidates off of each other to elevate his friend Henry A. Wise, Governor of Virginia, as a compromise candidate for president. At the 1858 state convention, Wood's manipulation was revealed, and Daniel Sickles succeeded in having Mozart delegates barred. In return, Wood unsuccessfully opposed Sickles's re-election to Congress. The split between Tammany and Mozart allowed Republicans to pick up several offices in the city in the 1858 election. In December 1858, President Buchanan responded by granting all patronage at the Port of New York to Tammany, further isolating Wood. Tammany offered him re-admittance, but he declined.

=== Results ===
At the 1859 city convention, Wood's Mozart delegates enlisted armed force to seize the convention, beginning proceedings without the Tammany delegates (a traditional Tammany strategy) and using violence to prevent any challenge to their proceedings. Wood's tactics at the 1859 convention drew backlash and forever alienated him from respectable politics.

As a result, two Democratic tickets were nominated in the city, with Wood heading the Mozart Hall slate while the Fifth Avenue Democrats, a group of wealthy, conservative men including August Belmont and Samuel J. Tilden, forced the nomination of William Frederick Havemeyer on a Tammany ticket.

== General election ==
=== Candidates ===
- William Frederick Havemayer, former mayor (Tammany Hall)
- George Opdyke, Assemblyman and banker (Republican)
- Fernando Wood, former mayor (Mozart Hall)

=== Campaign ===
Primarily through the Daily News, Wood attacked the Tammany–Fifth Avenue fusion as "kid-glove, scented, silk stocking, poodle-headed, degenerate aristocracy" who were out of touch with real Democrats. Wood also delivered a series of pro-slavery and pro-Southern speeches, decrying John Brown and abolitionism as a threat to the Union. Privately, he advised Governor Wise not to execute Brown in fears of stirring sympathy for abolition.

Both Democrats and Republicans attacked Wood for his past corruption and his "imperial" ambition.

=== Results ===
In an election with 88.1% turnout, Wood pulled off a narrow three way victory. He received 38.3% of the vote against 34.6% for Havemeyer and 27.4% for Opdyke. Compared to his prior campaigns, which had been on the Tammany Hall ticket, Wood ran marginally more strongly in well-off neighborhoods and marginally worse in working-class neighborhoods.

His support of the Southern cause likely appealed to merchants and workers dependent on their trade. As a result, he ran strongly in the lower nine wards, where he won a majority in six of nine, and on the East Side, which contained a number of shipbuilding, commercial, and related industries tied to trade with the South.

Along with his victory, Wood's coattails elected eleven school commissioners and helped Greene C. Bronson defeat Samuel J. Tilden for corporation counsel. However, Mozart Hall failed to gain a majority on the Common Council, meaning that Wood would have to broker with Tammany and Republicans to govern the city for the next two years, curtailing many of his grandiose proposals for a powerful executive.

1859 New York City mayoral election
Party	Candidate	Votes	%
Independent Democratic	Fernando Wood	29,940	38.25%
Democratic	William F. Havemeyer	26,913	34.39%
Republican	George Opdyke	21,417	27.36%
Total votes		78,170	100.00%

=== Results by ward ===
Results by wards
Ward	Wood Mozart		Havemeyer Tammany		Opdyke Republican		Total
Ward	Votes	%	Votes	%	Votes	%	Total
1	820	49.97%	548	33.39%	273	16.64%	1,641
2	155	32.70%	156	32.91%	163	34.39%	474
3	243	38.03%	221	34.59%	175	27.38%	639
4	1,464	65.39%	513	22.91%	262	11.70%	2,239
5	1,011	39.49%	884	34.53%	665	25.98%	2,560
6	1,110	42.64%	1,340	51.48%	153	5.88%	2,603
7	1,849	44.41%	1,275	30.63%	1,039	24.96%	4,163
8	1,411	36.51%	1,496	38.72%	957	24.77%	3,864
9	1,441	24.42%	2,112	35.79%	2,348	39.79%	5,901
10	913	31.75%	1,189	41.36%	773	26.89%	2,875
11	2,207	43.61%	1,767	34.91%	1,087	21.48%	5,061
12	982	40.48%	861	35.49%	583	24.03%	2,426
13	1,272	39.43%	1,081	33.51%	873	27.06%	3,226
14	1,638	54.31%	1,013	33.59%	365	12.10%	3,016
15	733	21.28%	1,461	42.41%	1,251	36.31%	3,445
16	1,609	32.25%	1,609	32.25%	1,771	35.50%	4,989
17	2,576	39.00%	2,231	33.77%	1,799	27.23%	6,606
18	2,064	38.87%	1,825	34.37%	1,421	26.76%	5,310
19	1,412	45.95%	826	26.88%	835	27.17%	3,073
20	2,091	34.43%	2,008	33.06%	1,974	32.51%	6,073
21	1,576	34.10%	1,574	34.05%	1,472	31.85%	4,622
22	1,363	39.35%	923	26.65%	1,178	34.00%	3,464
Totals	29,940	38.25%	26,913	34.39%	21,417	27.36%	78,270
