= 1854 New York City mayoral election =

- November 7, 1854
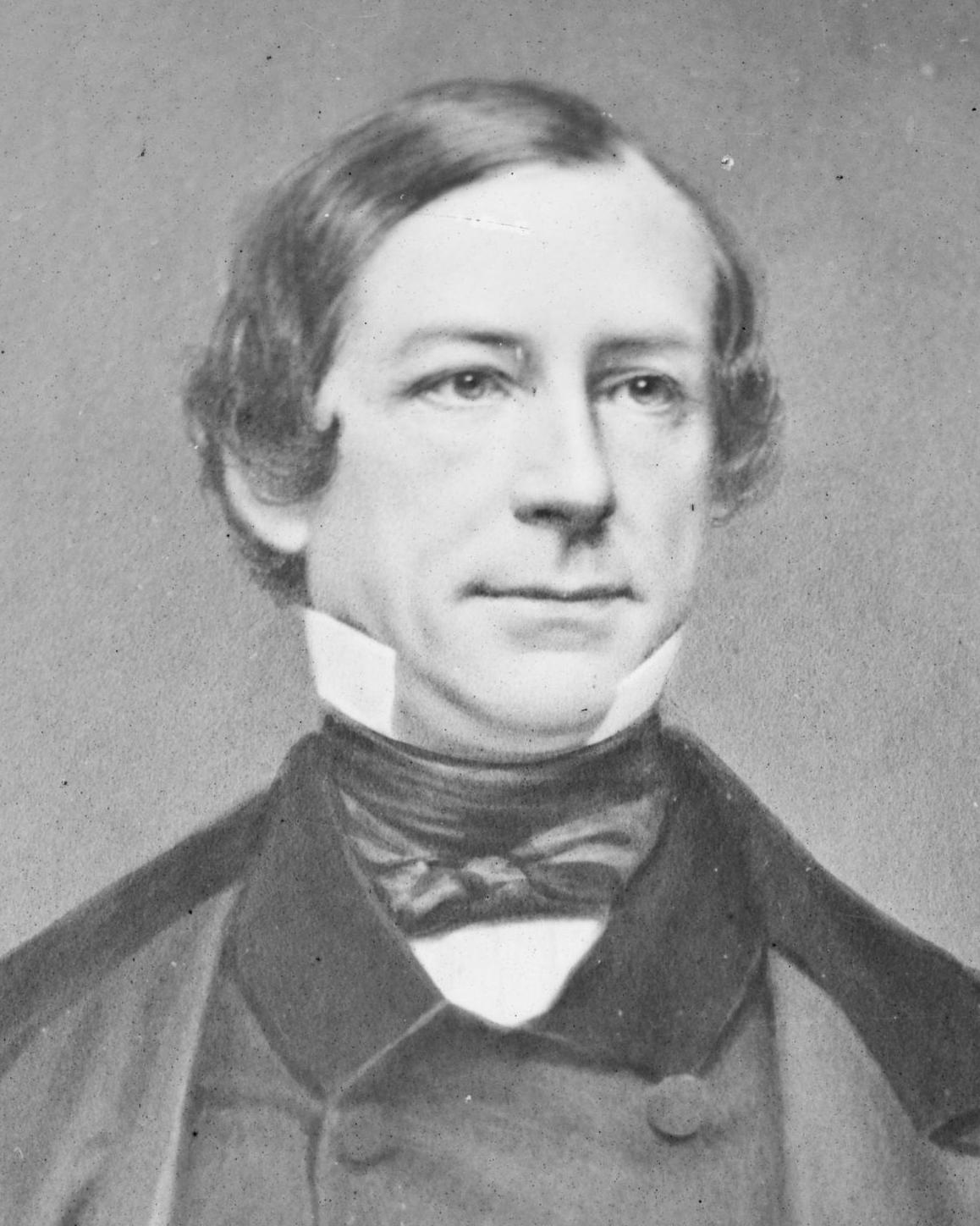

Nominee	Fernando Wood	James W. Barker
Party	Democratic	Know Nothing
Popular vote	20,003	18,547
Percentage	33.5%	31.1%
Nominee	Wilson G. Hunt	John J. Herrick
Party	Independent Democratic	Whig
Popular vote	15,397	5,696
Percentage	25.8%	9.5%
Mayor before election
Jacob A. Westervelt
Democratic
Elected mayor
Fernando Wood
Democratic

An election for Mayor of New York City was held on November 7, 1854.

Incumbent mayor Jacob A. Westervelt was not a candidate for re-election to a second term in office. In a four-way race to succeed him, former U.S. representative Fernando Wood won the first of his three terms in office over American Party nominee James W. Barker, reformist Wilson G. Hunt, and Whig nominee John J. Herrick. Wood was the first mayor elected from Tammany Hall, opening a long period of the society's dominance of Democratic politics in the city.

== Background ==
After his loss to Ambrose Kingsland in the 1850 mayoral election, Fernando Wood withdrew from politics to focus on his real estate portfolio and his growing family. The Whig Party collapsed and Tammany Hall remained torn among its various factions. Wood began to test the waters for a political return in November 1853, privately organizing against John Van Buren's Free Soil faction and supporting the Young America Movement. He was elected a committeeman by the Nineteenth Ward Democratic Committee once again.

== Democratic nomination ==
In early 1854, the Kansas-Nebraska Act further scrambled city politics, alienating the Free Soil Democrats and bringing the Hard Shell and Soft Shell factions in closer alliance. In response, Wood planned a rally to celebrate Stephen Douglas and Franklin Pierce and denounce John Van Buren and his Free Soil Democrats, presenting the image of a party unified in its condemnation of the Free Soilers.

Wood further cultivated his political image by siding with Governor Horatio Seymour in his veto of an alcohol prohibition bill, though he grounded his support in opposition to the regulation of private behavior, drawing a comparison between alcohol consumption and slavery. Perhaps most conniving of all, he secretly accepted a place on the Know-Nothing executive committee, despite his long standing political support among the New York immigrant community and his support for immigrant causes.

Wood won both the Soft and Hard nominations for mayor easily, though a faction of extreme Hards formed yet another ticket and nominated Wilson G. Hunt, a cloth merchant and philanthropist with ties to Peter Cooper.

== General election ==
=== Candidates ===
- James W. Barker (American)
- John J. Herrick (Whig)
- Wilson G. Hunt, cloth merchant and philanthropist (Reform Democratic)
- Fernando Wood, shipping magnate, former U.S. representative, and candidate for mayor in 1850 (Democratic)

=== Campaign ===
Running with the support of both major Democratic factions against a divided field, Wood had a strong advantage. However, his campaign was nearly upended when several Know-Nothings filed affidavits disclosing his membership in their committee. Wood denied the accusation and threatened to sue for libel.

=== Results ===
On November 8, Wood was elected mayor of New York City with only 33.6% of the vote. The Know-Nothing nominee James W. Barker received 31% and Hunt received 25.8%. Despite the revelation of his Know-Nothingism, Wood's strongest support came from immigrant and low-income wards which would form the backbone of Tammany support for the next century.

1854 New York City mayoral election
Party	Candidate	Votes	%
Democratic	Fernando Wood (incumbent)	20,003	33.54%
Know Nothing	James W. Barker	18,547	31.10%
Independent Democratic	Wilson G. Hunt	15,397	25.82%
Whig	John J. Herrick	5,696	9.55%
Total votes		59,643	100.00%
