= John Kelly (New York politician) =

American politician (1822–1886)

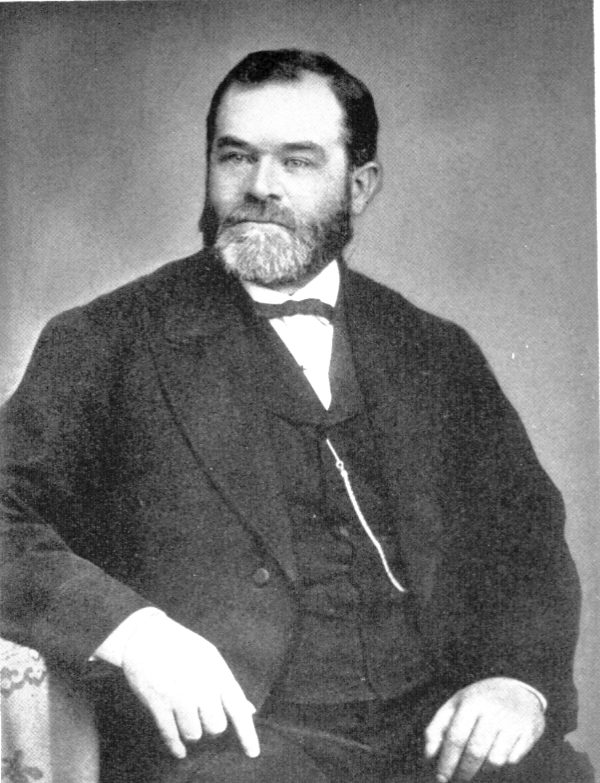

Member of the U.S. House of Representatives from New York's 4th district
- In office March 4, 1855 – December 25, 1858
- Preceded by: Michael Walsh
- Succeeded by: Thomas J. Barr

Comptroller of New York City
- In office 1876–1879

Personal details
- Born: April 20, 1822 New York City, New York, U.S.
- Died: January 6, 1886 (aged 63) New York City, New York, U.S.
- Resting place: Old St. Patrick’s Cathedral
- Party: Democratic

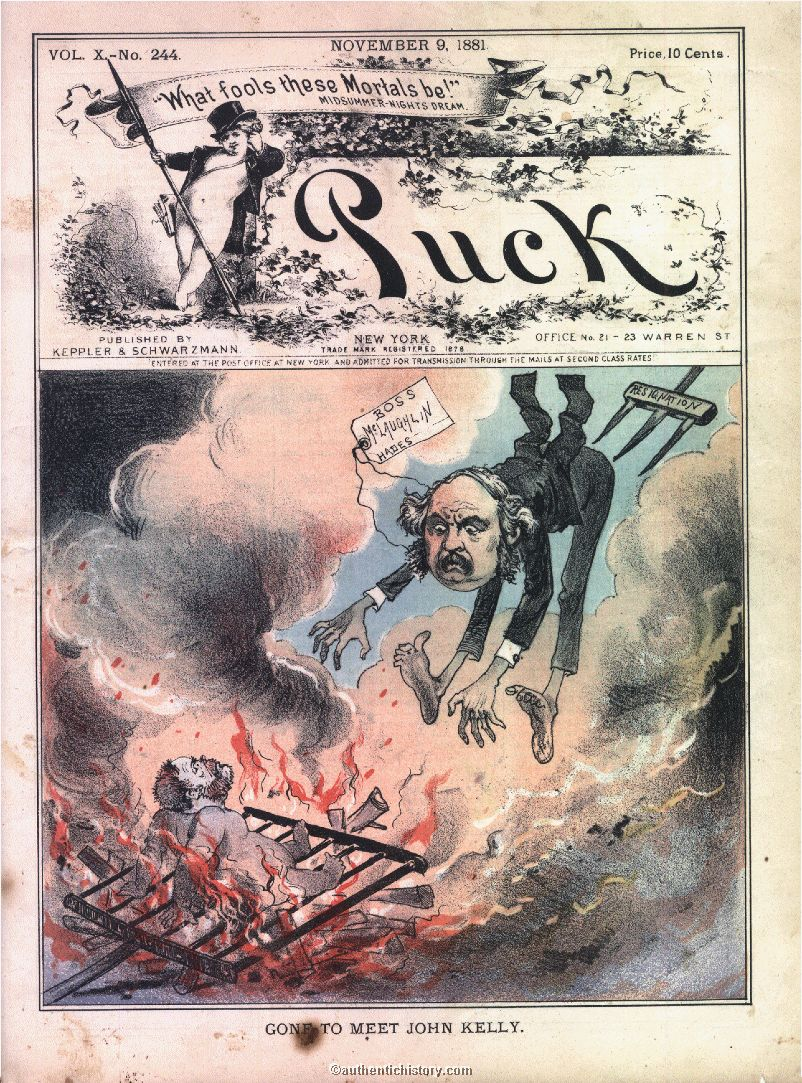
Puck magazine caricature of Kelly (on grill), 1881

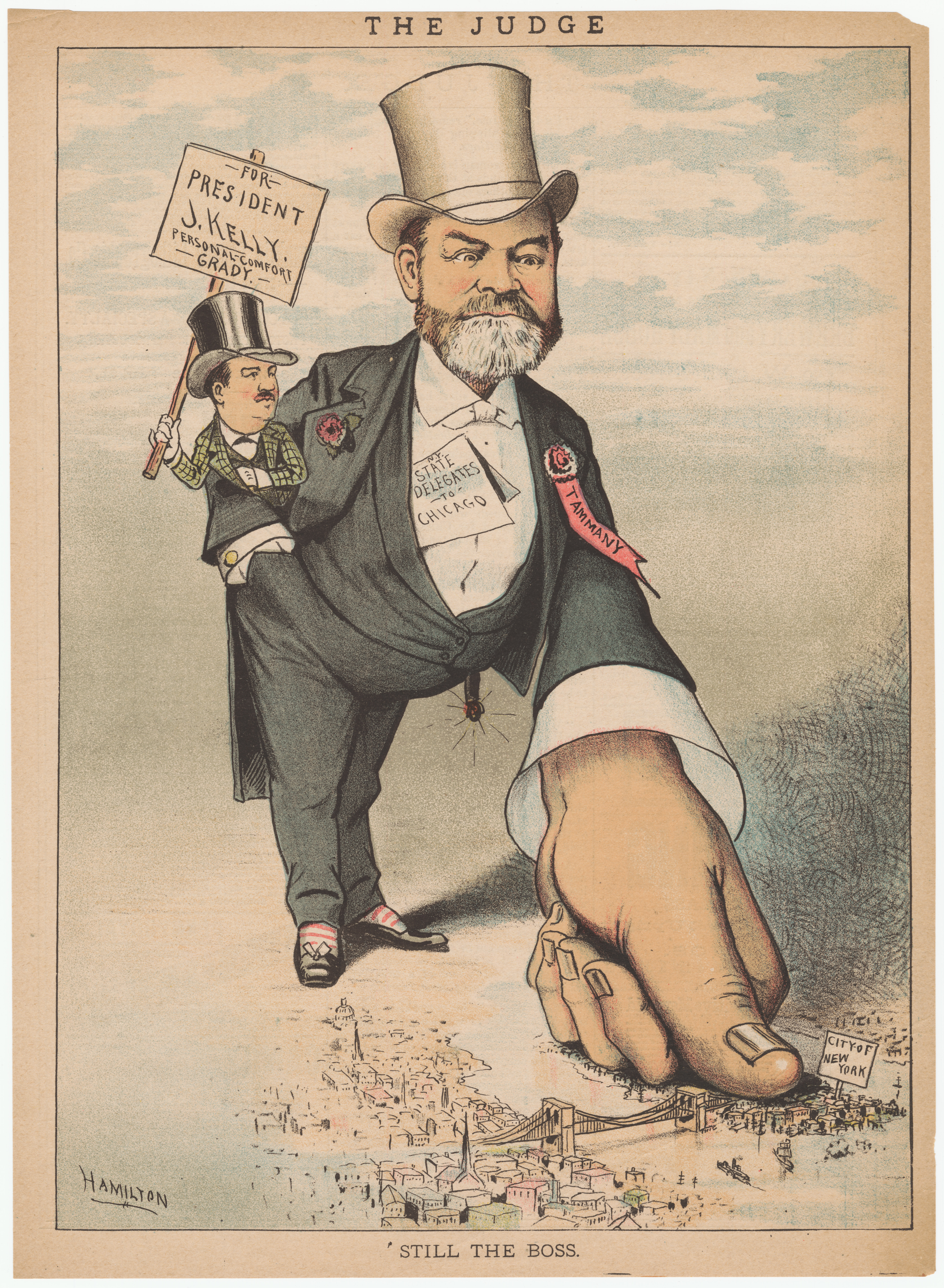
This cartoon describes the aftermath of the fight for the Democratic Presidential nomination in 1884.

John Kelly (April 20, 1822 – June 1, 1886) of New York City, known as "Honest John", was a boss of Tammany Hall and a U.S. Representative from New York from 1855 to 1858. The title "Honest" was given to him during his years as New York City Sheriff, and was more ironic than truthful.

Kelly was able to amass a vast fortune estimated at $800,000 ($18,400,000 in current dollar terms) by 1867 by both ethical and questionable means. In addition, after having his methods questioned and his title insulted by New York City Mayor William Havemeyer, Kelly responded with a lawsuit for libel. On the day of the trial, Havemeyer dropped dead of apoplexy. He had a questionable reputation and was the subject of a gubernatorial investigation at the time of his death.

== Family life ==
Kelly was born in New York City to Hugh Kelly and Sarah Donnelly Kelly. He received a parochial education but was forced to quit when his father died. He married Ann McIlhargy, to whom a son and two daughters were born. By 1872, his wife and children had died. He then fled the city overseas, a defeated man from the loss of his family.

He returned to New York in response to the Boss Tweed scandal and eventually was remarried to Ann Theresa Mullen, the niece of New York's Cardinal McCloskey. A son and a daughter were born of that marriage.

== Career ==
Kelly was apprenticed to the mason's trade, and engaged in business for himself at the age of 21. Kelly, in response to anti-Catholic sentiment, was driven to politics and became a champion of Catholic and immigrant causes in the 1840s. Kelly joined the influential Tammany Society and the next year he was elected alderman; until his death, he was active as a Democratic politician.

=== Congress ===
From 1855 to 1858, he served in Congress, the only Catholic in the House of Representatives in that period of Know Nothing ascendency. He served two terms until resigning on Christmas Day, 1858.

=== Sheriff ===
Kelly was later elected Sheriff of the County of New York and served from 1859 to 1861 and again from 1865 to 1867.

During Kelly's time as sheriff, his wife and children died and he left New York for an extended overseas trip. After nearly three years, he returned in 1871 and aided Charles O'Conor, Samuel J. Tilden, and their associates in the struggle against the Tweed ring, and Kelly cooperated with Tilden in reorganizing the political machine. The Tweed ring scandal destroyed the old Tammany leadership and shattered the democracy. It was a time of corruption and deceitful politics. Kelly was away and was seemingly untouched by the corruption and so was able to assume the leadership of Tammany Hall.

By 1874, Kelly was in control of Tammany Hall, and for the next decade, he was able to determine the course of New York City elections.

=== Comptroller of New York City ===
In 1876, Kelly succeeded Andrew H. Green, appointed by Mayor William Wickham, as Comptroller of New York City. Kelly was very successful as comptroller. Over five years, the municipal debt was reduced by twelve million dollars. During his time in power he was continually at war with Tilden's faction. Kelly refused to support Tilden's candidate for governor, incumbent Lucius Robinson, and ran for governor himself as an independent. The result was the election in 1879 of Republican Alonzo Cornell, who won by a plurality. Kelly himself was city comptroller from 1876 to 1879.

Upon retirement in 1884, he yielded his political control to one of his lieutenants, Richard Croker.

=== Death and burial ===
He died on June 1, 1886, in New York City. He was interred in Old St. Patrick's Cathedral on Mott Street in New York City.

== In popular culture ==
- Animated children's film An American Tail makes reference to Kelly with the character of "Honest John", voiced by Neil Ross.
- The song "Boys on the Docks", by the Celtic punk band Dropkick Murphys, was written in memory of Kelly and his popularity within the Irish-American and Catholic immigrant community.

== Sources ==
- United States Congress. "John Kelly (id: K000075)". Biographical Directory of the United States Congress.
- Jerome Mushkat. "Kelly, John; American National Biography Online Feb. 2000.
- Connable, Alfred, and Edward Silberfarb. Tigers of Tammany: Nine Men Who Ran New York. New York: Holt, Rinehart, and Winston, 1967. Print.

U.S. House of Representatives
| Preceded by Michael Walsh | Member of the U.S. House of Representatives from New York's 4th congressional district 1855–1858 | Succeeded by Thomas J. Barr |
