= 1850 New York City mayoral election =

- November 5, 1850
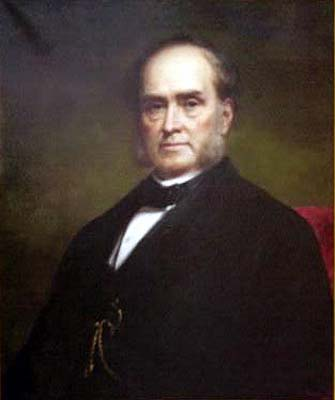

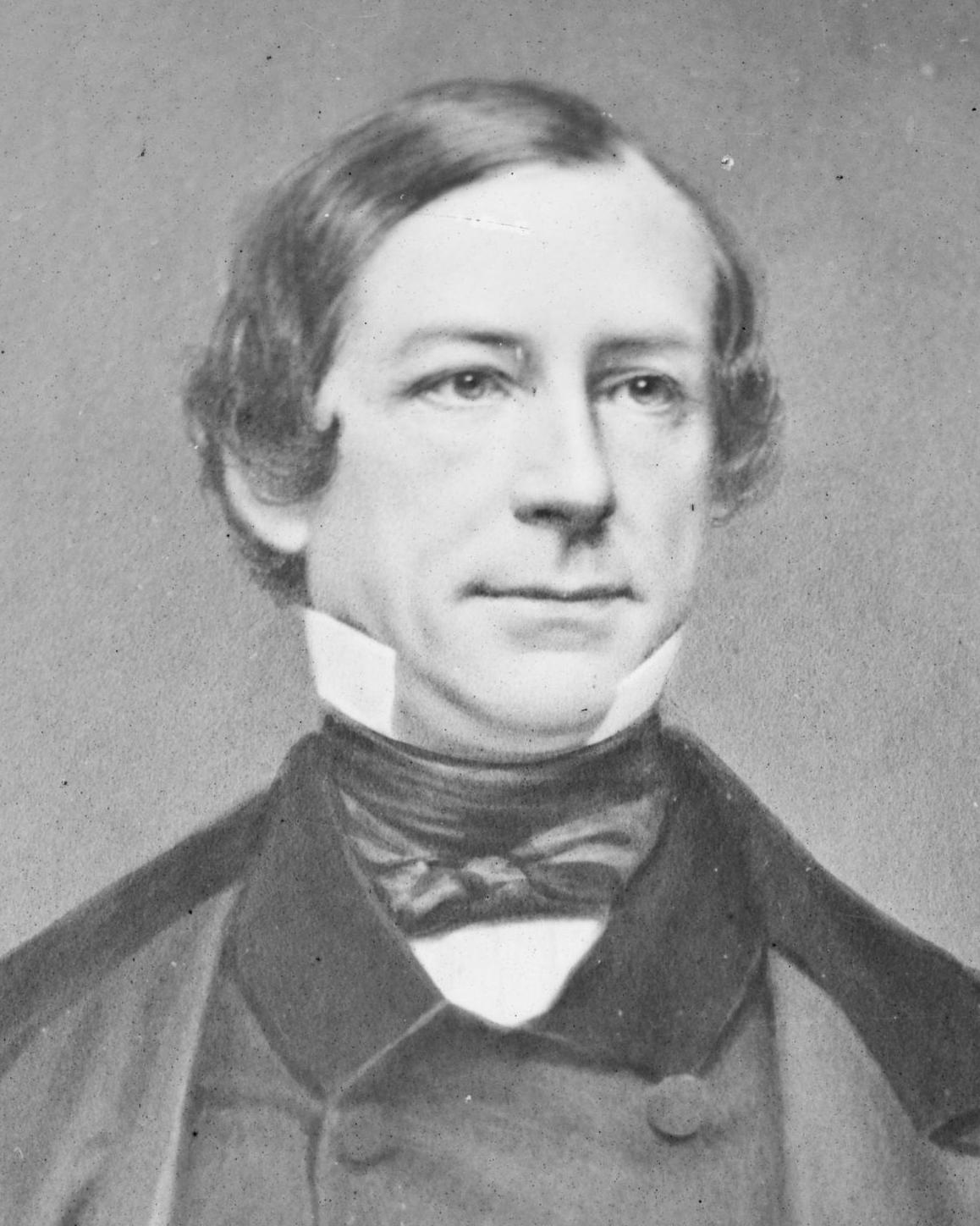
Nominee	Ambrose Kingsland	Fernando Wood
Party	Whig	Democratic
Popular vote	22,478	18,052
Percentage	55.0%	44.2%
Mayor before election
Caleb S. Woodhull
Whig
Elected mayor
Ambrose Kingsland
Whig

An election for Mayor of New York City was held on November 5, 1850.

Whig Ambrose Kingsland defeated Democratic nominee Fernando Wood. This was the first of Wood's seven campaigns for mayor; he would serve three non-consecutive terms in office.

== Democratic nomination ==
At the 1849 New York Democratic Convention in Syracuse, the state Democratic Party had reached a tenuous truce between its Hunker and Barnburner factions, promulgating a platform which advocated preservation of slavery where it already existed but recognizing the theoretical right of Congress to prevent the extension of slavery to new territories. The truce quickly collapsed into new divisions, with "Soft Shell Democrats" endorsing the Syracuse platform and "Hard Shells" firmly rejecting Congressional authority to regulate slavery in the territories. A small remaining contingent of Free Soil Democrats, led by John Van Buren, rejected the compromise and any attempt to expand slavery to the territories.

Despite his pro-slavery convictions, Fernando Wood stood for election as a Nineteenth Ward Democratic Committeeman on a Soft platform. Softs held the majority in Tammany Hall and Wood interpreted the Syracuse platform as a defense of slavery. Throughout the 1849 and 1850 debates that led to the Compromise of 1850, Hards and Softs contested for control of Tammany Hall, sometimes physically. Wood chaired the Soft General Committee, urging for party unity. With two Committees claiming exclusive party control and voter fraud obscuring the society's April 1850 council elections, the Tammany governing board dissolved both committees and called for a citywide convention to select an entirely new official General Committee. At this convention, Wood embraced the compromise position that Congress lacked control over slavery but that popular sovereignty could decide the issue for each new territory.

The city convention deadlocked and new Tammany elections were held, producing a fusion Committee with a slight Hard majority, but Wood's position was embraced as the state party platform in 1850. Wood himself became the Democratic candidate for mayor, despite some Hard resistance.

== General election ==
=== Candidates ===
- Alfred Carson (Independent) (write-in)
- Ambrose Kingsland, merchant (Whig)
- Fernando Wood, shipping magnate and former U.S. representative (Democratic)

=== Results ===
The 1850 election was a landslide for the Whigs, who carried 15 wards, 13 out of 16 assembly races, and the governorship. Wood was dogged by a personal affair alleging he had defrauded his own relatives and received the lowest percentage for any Tammany candidate since direct elections for mayor began in 1834.

1850 New York City mayoral election
Party	Candidate	Votes	%
Whig	Ambrose C. Kingsland	22,478	55.02%
Democratic	Fernando Wood	18,052	44.19%
Write-in		324	0.79%
Total votes		40,854	100.00%
