= William Frederick Havemeyer =

American politician and businessman (1804–1874)

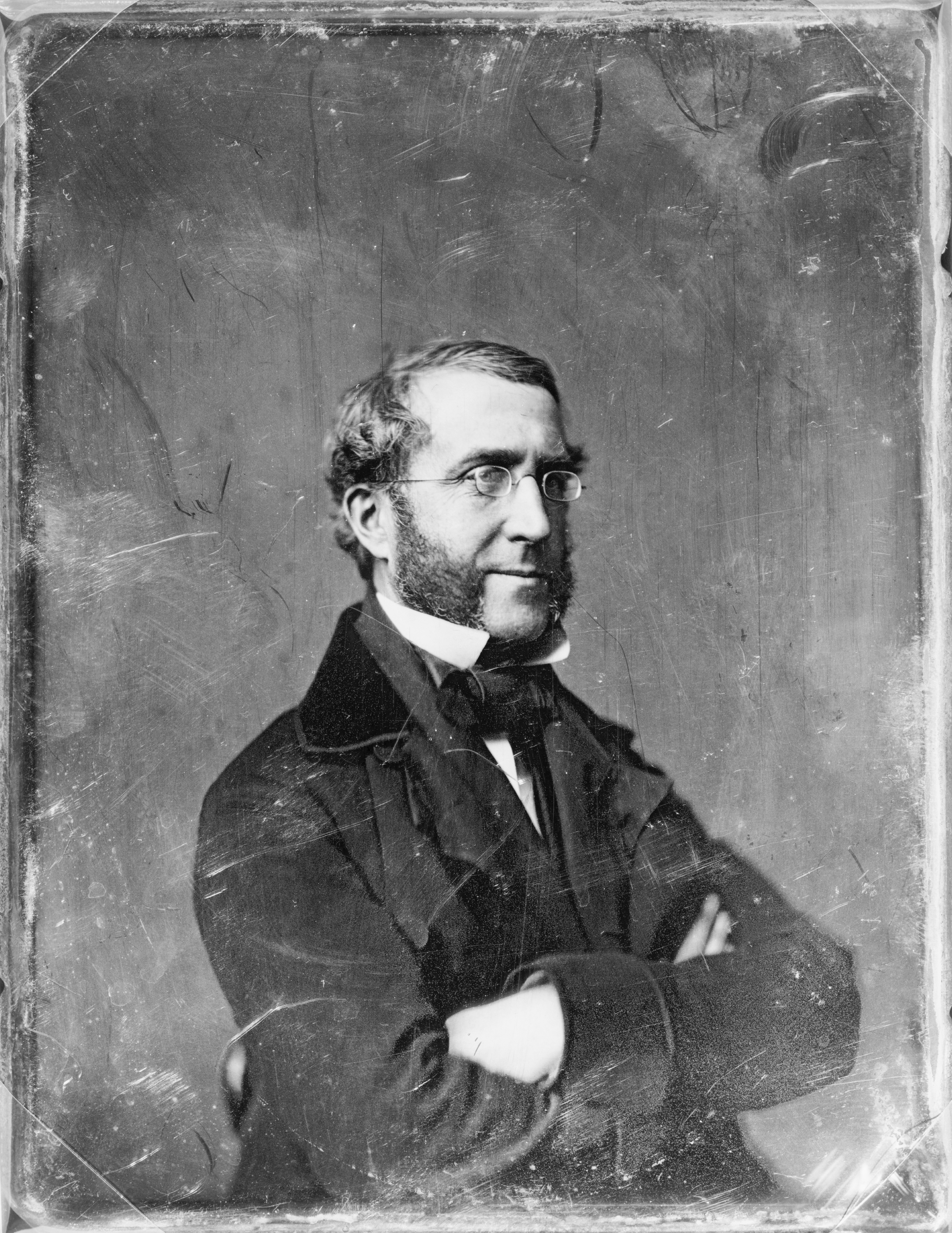
- William Frederick Havemeyer, circa 1844-1860

67th, 70th and 81st Mayor of New York City
- In office 1873–1874
- Preceded by: Abraham Oakey Hall
- Succeeded by: Samuel B. H. Vance (Acting)
- In office 1848–1849
- Preceded by: William Brady
- Succeeded by: Caleb Smith Woodhull
- In office 1845–1846
- Preceded by: James Harper
- Succeeded by: Andrew H. Mickle

Personal details
- Born: February 12, 1804 New York City, U.S.
- Died: November 30, 1874 (aged 70) New York City, U.S.
- Party: Democratic (before 1872); Republican (1872–1874)
- Spouse: Sarah Agnes Craig (m. 1828)
- Children: 10
- Relatives: Havemeyer family
- Education: Columbia University

William Frederick Havemeyer (February 12, 1804 – November 30, 1874) was an American businessman and politician who served three times as mayor of New York City during the 19th century.

== Early years ==
Havemeyer was born in New York City at No. 31 Pine Street in Financial District, Manhattan. He was the son of William Havemeyer (1770–1851) who was the first of the family to emigrate from Germany to America. He had been left at an orphan in childhood, and at the age of fifteen went to London, where he learned the trade of sugar refining, becoming in time the superintendent of the refinery. In 1799, he came to New York City under contract to Edmund Seaman & Co. and took charge of their sugar house on Pine Street.

His father began his own business in 1807, establishing one of the first sugar refineries in New York City, on Vandam Street between Hudson and Greenwich Streets in the modern-day neighborhood of Hudson Square. In the same year, he took out his naturalization papers.

The younger Havemeyer grew up near the family sugar refinery. He received a liberal arts education, attending Columbia College of Columbia University, graduating in 1823. Soon after graduation he entered his father's service as clerk and obtained a thorough business training. In 1828, he formed a partnership with his cousin, Frederick Christian Havemeyer (1807–1891), under the firm name of W. F. & F. C. Havemeyer, sugar refiners. In 1842, he sold out his interest in the firm to his brother Albert. Thus after fourteen years, while still young, he retired from business a wealthy man.

=== Ancestors ===
Havemeyer's middle-class ancestors lived in Bückeburg, in the German principality of Schaumburg-Lippe. Some spelled the last name Hoffmeyer or Hoevemeyer. In 1644, Hermann Hoevemeyer formed, with nineteen others, a bakers' guild. Dietrich Wilhelm Hoevemeyer, born in 1725, was a master baker, and a member of the city council of Bückeburg, and also served in the Seven Years' War.

His cousin's son Henry Osborne Havemeyer became a member of the Havemeyer family sugar refining firm, which controlled more than half the entire sugar interest of the country. Henry O.'s brother, Theodore Havemeyer, was co-founder of the U.S. Golf Association and U.S. Open.

== Career ==
In 1844, Havemeyer entered local politics with the Democratic Party as an elector for James K. Polk and George M. Dallas during the United States presidential election. He had been a supporter of President Andrew Jackson. He was also friendly with President Martin Van Buren with whom he had corresponded and urged vehemently to emulate Jackson's firmness in the face of popular outcry.

In 1844, the Democrats of the ward Havemeyer lived in were divided into two factions about equal in strength. To avoid a conflict, it was determined to send to the Tammany Hall convention three influential men, irrespective of factional feeling. James T. Brady, Gustavus A. Conover, and Havemeyer were selected. Then at the state convention of the Democratic Party, held at Syracuse September 4, 1844, Havemeyer was nominated for the office of presidential elector.

=== First terms as mayor ===
As a member of the general committee of Tammany Hall, Havemeyer showed such marked business ability that he was appointed chairman of the finance committee. In this position, he gained many friends in the Democratic Party, and he was recommended to President Polk by a number of influential citizens as eminently fitted for the collectorship of the Port of New York. But Havemeyer's independence did not suit the politicians who desired a collector who could be more easily controlled by the party leaders. With a view to retrieve control of the collectorship, and at the same time not run counter to Havemeyer's growing popularity, they offered him the nomination for the mayoralty.

In 1845, with the support of Tammany Hall, the Democratic Party political machine, Havemeyer was nominated for the office of Mayor of New York, "laying stress on the fact that he was a native New Yorker". His opponent was incumbent mayor James Harper. In April, he was elected by a large majority and served a one-year term, from 1845 to 1846.

The New York State Legislature approved a proposal to authorize creation of a New York City police force on May 7, 1844, along with abolition of the nightwatch system. During Havemeyer's administration, the NYPD was organized on May 13, 1845, with the city divided into three districts, with courts, magistrates, clerks, and station houses being set up.

Havemeyer attempted to reform the powers of the Common Council, leading to the drafting of a new government charter that provided for direct election of department heads who had previously been appointed by the council. In 1846, together with Robert B. Minturn and Gulian C. Verplanck, Havemeyer strove to abolish the abuses practised on immigrants. The result of their efforts was the Board of Emigration Commissioners, of which Havemeyer was the first president. His reform efforts irritated the Tammany leaders: "Mayor Havemeyer not being pliable enough for the Wigwam leaders, they nominated and elected, in the spring of 1846, Andrew H. Mickle, by a vote of 21,675, the Whigs receiving 15,111, and the Native Americans 8,301."

In 1848, Havemeyer was again elected as mayor. Although invited to run for succeeding terms in both 1846 and 1849, he declined to serve more than one term at a time.

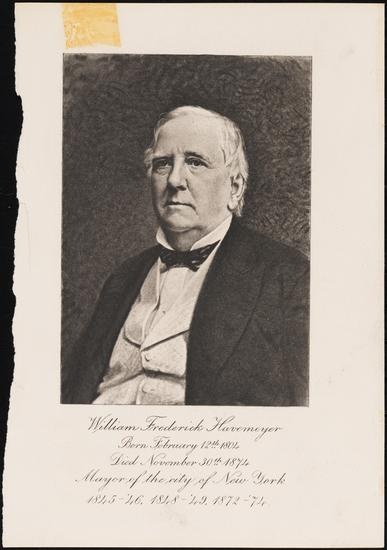
William Frederick Havemeyer (1804-1874)

=== Business career ===
As a young man, Havemeyer had been a director of the Merchants' Exchange Bank. When he took leave from New York's political scene, Havemeyer returned to business as a banker. In 1851, he was voted president of the Bank of North America which he successfully led through the panic of 1857 and left in 1861. In 1857, he also became president of the New York Savings Bank when that institution was in great danger of suspension, leaving it also in 1861 after it was placed upon a secure foundation. He also became a large stockholder of the Pennsylvania Coal Company and Long Island Rail Road among insurance and other corporate interests.

Also on leaving the office of mayor, Havemeyer became a trustee of the Astor Public Library.

=== Return to politics ===
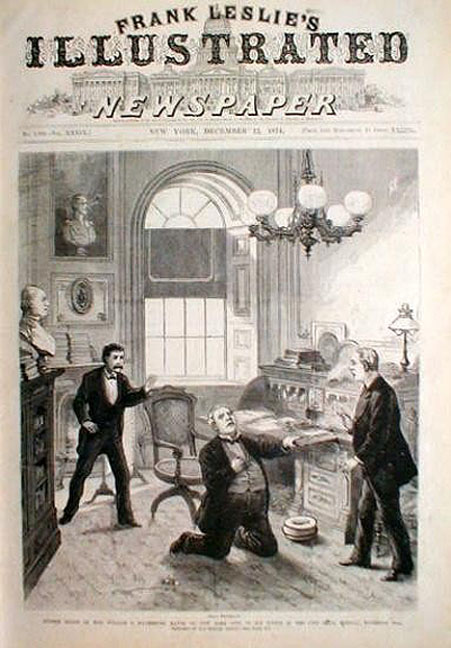
The death of William Havemeyer, originally appearing as "Sudden Death of the Hon. William F. Havemeyer in his Office," New York, NY, Frank Leslie's Illustrated Newspaper, December 1874)

In 1859, he was nominated by Tammany Hall to run against Democratic candidate Fernando Wood, who had lost favor with some of the Tammany factions, and the Republican candidate George Opdyke. Havemeyer narrowly lost to Wood 30,000 to 27,000, with Opdyke receiving 23,000 votes.

During the American Civil War, Havemeyer was a strong advocate of the Union and urged the abolition of slavery as a war measure. In July 1866, Havemeyer was selected, along with Thurlow Weed, as arbitrator in the matter of a controversy relative to certain claims which had been pending for more than ten years between the Board of Public Charities and Correction and the Board of Commissioners of Emigration involving an amount of more than $100,000. The report was accepted as satisfactory by both parties, and the controversy settled.

In the wake the Boss Tweed financial scandal, which forced the political boss of Tammany Hall to flee the country, Havemeyer was named vice president of the political reform organization Committee of 70 and assisted in organizing reform associations in all the city's assembly districts. He was chosen chairman of a noted mass reform meeting held at Cooper Union on September 4, 1871, and his speech on that occasion was one of the most fearless and outspoken of any in its denunciation of the official thieves.

Largely involved in voting the corrupt Tweed administration out of office, Havemeyer was nominated by the Republican Party Convention as a candidate for Mayor of New York on October 1, 1872. Although he at first declined to accept the nomination, the decision was supported by the Committee of 70 and the United Reform Convention, and he once again returned to successfully defeat Tammany Hall candidate Abraham R. Lawrence and James O'Brien to be elected and become Mayor for a third time, the first candidate since DeWitt Clinton to do so.

During his third term, in the reorganization of the city government political organization under the Charter of 1873, several of his nominations were opposed by the Board of Aldermen. The greater part of his time was spent in wrangles with the aldermen and other city officers. Several of his appointments were controversial, for example, he reappointed two police commissioners who had been convicted of violating their oaths of office. An application was made to the Governor of New York for his removal from office, a step which the executive declined to take.

== Personal life ==
On April 15, 1828, Havemeyer was married to Sarah Agnes Craig (1807–1894), the daughter of U.S. Congressman Hector Craig (1775–1842). Together, they were the parents of ten children, including:

- Sarah C. Havemeyer (1832–1915), who married Hector Armstrong (1826-1898)
- John Craig Havemeyer (1832–1922), who married Alice Francis (1847-1930)
- Henry Havemeyer (1838–1886)
- Hector Craig Havemeyer (1840–1889), who never married.
- James Havemeyer (1843–1912), who married Sarah Cordelia Conklin (1841–1911)
- Laura Amelia Havemeyer (1845-1911), who married Isaac Walker Maclay (1841–1908)
- Charles Havemeyer
- William Frederick Havemeyer (1850–1913), who married Josephine L. Harmon, daughter of Alexander G. Harmon, in 1876.

Havemeyer died while in office on November 30, 1874, aged 70, in New York City. He was buried in Woodlawn Cemetery in The Bronx.

=== Legacy ===
The New York City Fire Department operated a fireboat named William Frederick Havemeyer from 1875 to 1901.

Political offices
Preceded by James Harper	Mayor of New York City; 1845–1846	Succeeded by Andrew H. Mickle
Preceded by William V. Brady	Mayor of New York City; 1848–1849	Succeeded by Caleb Smith Woodhull
Preceded by A. Oakey Hall	Mayor of New York City; 1873–1874	Succeeded by Samuel B. H. Vance
