= George Lovett Kingsland =

American merchant and railroad executive

- Born: September 4, 1834; New York City, US
- Died: July 14, 1892 (aged 57); Babylon, New York, US
- Education: Columbia University
- Spouse: Helen Schermerhorn Welles (m. 1875)
- Parent(s): Ambrose Kingsland; Mary Lovett Kingsland
- Relatives: Newbold Morris (grandson); George L. K. Morris (grandson)

George Lovett Kingsland (September 4, 1834 – July 14, 1892) was an American merchant and railroad executive.

== Early life ==
George Kingsland was born on September 4, 1834, in New York City. He was the eldest of eight children born to Mary (née Lovett) Kingsland (1814–1868) and Ambrose Kingsland (1804–1878), a merchant who was the 71st Mayor of New York City. Among his younger siblings was Ambrose Cornelius Kingsland Jr., (who married Katharine Aspinwall, daughter of merchant William Henry Aspinwall); Henry Pierre Kingsland; Mary Helena Kingsland, who married William Wright Tompkins (grandson of Vice President Daniel D. Tompkins); Cornelius Francis Kingsland; Walter Francis Kingsland, Albert Alexander Kingsland; Philip Kingsland, who died young; and Augusta Lovett Kingsland, who married Herman Leroy Jones.

He was a member of the Kingsland family of New Jersey who had, for nearly 200 years, lived in and around Belleville, New Jersey. His paternal grandparents were Cornelius Kingsland and Abigail (née Cock) Kingsland. His nephew, Walter F. Kingsland, married Princess Marie Louise of Orléans in 1928, and his niece, Marjorie Kingsland, married Viscount Robert de Vaulogé. His maternal grandfather, George Lovett, was born in England.

Kingsland attended Columbia University, where he was a member of the Alpha Zeta chapter of the Chi Psi fraternity, and graduated in 1856.

== Career ==
After graduation from Columbia, Kingsland began his career with his father's firm, which became known as A. C. Kingsland and Sons, and was located at No. 55 Broadway in lower Manhattan, eventually becoming a partner. The firm was involved in the sale of sperm oil. In 1872, Kingsland became a director of the George's Creek and Cumberland Coal Company and served as the president of the George's Creek Railroad.

After his father's death in 1878, George, along with his siblings, inherited the large estate. The property, which was not divided, was largely along the Hudson River in North Tarrytown, present day Sleepy Hollow, New York, and George managed the estate for the whole family.

== Personal life ==
In 1875, Kingsland was married to Helen Schermerhorn Welles (1842–1911). Helen, a daughter of Katharine (née Schermerhorn) Welles and Benjamin Sumner Welles, a granddaughter of Abraham Schermerhorn and niece of Caroline Schermerhorn Astor, the Mrs. Astor, who was married to William Astor. Helen's brother was philanthropist Benjamin Welles Jr. and her nephew was Sumner Welles, the Ambassador to Cuba and Under Secretary of State. Together, they were the parents of:

- Helen Schermerhorn Kingsland (1876–1956), who married Augustus Newbold Morris (1868–1928), the son of A. N. Morris.
- George Lovett Kingsland Jr. (1885–1952), who married Marion de Forest (née Cannon) Prince, daughter of Harry Le Grand Cannon and divorced wife of John Dyneley Prince Jr., in 1915. After the death of her father, Marion's mother remarried to Theodore Frelinghuysen. They divorced in 1923.
- Ethel Kingsland (1886–1967), who married Dr. Walter P. Anderton, president of the Medical Society of the County of New York, in 1915.

He was a member of the Union Club, the Eastern Yacht Club, the Seawanhaka Yacht Club and the Corinthian Yacht Club, and served as Commodore of the New York Yacht Club.

After suffering from gout and Bright's disease, Kingsland died at his summer residence in Babylon, New York, on July 14, 1892. After a funeral conducted by the Rev. Dr. Cook at his home, 430 Fifth Avenue, with singing by the boys choir of St. Bartholomew's Church, he was buried at Woodlawn Cemetery, in the Bronx. After his death, his widow lived at 62 Fifth Avenue until her death in 1911.

=== Descendants ===
Through his daughter Helen, he was the grandfather of Augustus Newbold Morris (1902–1966), who was a lawyer, president of the New York City Council, and two-time candidate for mayor of New York City, George Lovett Kingsland Morris (1905–1975), a painter who married Suzy Frelinghuysen, and Stephanus "Stephen" Van Cortlandt Morris (1909–1984), a diplomat.

Through his son George, he was the grandfather of Marian Kingsland (1916–2008), who married Count Hans Christoph Seherr-Thoss (1912–1992), a grandson of U.S. Ambassador Henry White, in 1938. Count Seherr-Thoss was a nephew of John Campbell White and a cousin of Queen Geraldine, the wife of King Zog I of Albania. They divorced and in 1947, she married Henry Osborne Havemeyer Frelinghuysen (d. 1994), a civic leader and breeder of thoroughbred horses who was the twin brother of U.S. Representative Peter Frelinghuysen Jr.
