= Andrew H. Mickle =

American politician (1805–1863)

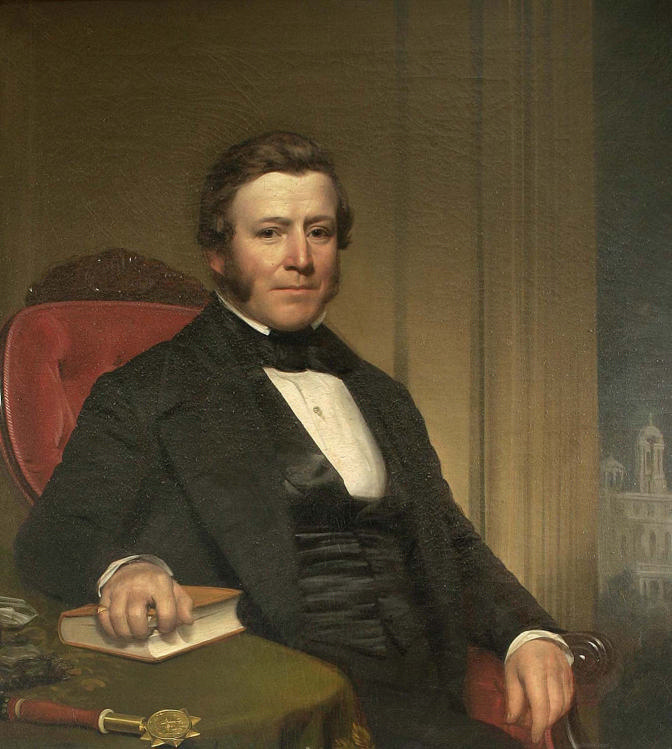

68th Mayor of New York City
- In office 1846–1847
- Preceded by: William F. Havemeyer
- Succeeded by: William Brady

Personal details
- Born: October 25, 1805 New York City, New York, U.S.
- Died: January 25, 1863 (aged 57) Bayside, Queens, New York, U.S.
- Resting place: Green-Wood Cemetery, Brooklyn, New York
- Party: Democratic
- Spouse(s): Caroline Augusta Miller (m. 1827); Mary Nicoll Lawrence (m. 1851)
- Profession: Tobacco dealer

Andrew Hutchins Mickle (October 25, 1805 – January 25, 1863) was the 68th Mayor of New York City from 1846 to 1847.

== Biography ==
Mickle was born in New York City. As a young man he married the daughter of George B. Miller, a tobacco dealer, afterwards working in his father-in-law's firm.

The George B. Miller & Co. tobacco business became famous as one of the first makers of the fine cut variety of chewing tobacco. Mickle eventually inherited the business and renamed it A. H. Mickle & Sons. He expanded the firm and its product line, and became wealthy as a result.

A Democrat affiliated with the Tammany Hall organization, in June 1845, he won election as a public school trustee for New York City's first ward. Later in 1845, he won election as Mayor of New York City, taking advantage of a four-way race to win with a plurality. After serving one two-year term Mickle declined to run for reelection and returned to his business interests.

Mickle died in Bayside, Queens on January 25, 1863. He was buried at Green-Wood Cemetery in Brooklyn.

Political offices
Preceded by William Havemeyer	Mayor of New York City; 1846 – 1847	Succeeded by William V. Brady
