= William Frederick Havemeyer (fireboat) =

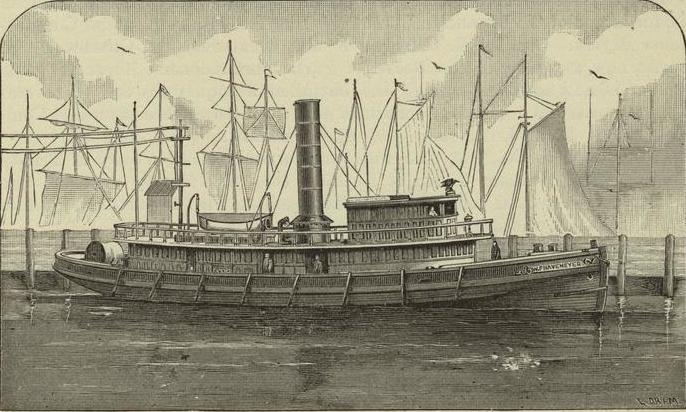
- FDNY fireboat William F. Havermeyer

History
- Name: William F. Havermeyer
- Owner: New York City
- In service: 1875
- Out of service: 1901

General characteristics
- Type: Fireboat
- Length: 106 ft (32 m)
- Beam: 22 ft (6.7 m)
- Draft: 10 ft (3.0 m)
- Crew: 10

William Frederick Havemeyer was New York City's first fireboat. The vessel entered service in 1875, and retired in 1901. She was named in honor of a recent mayor, William Frederick Havemeyer.

== Design and commissioning ==
The vessel was ordered in 1874, around the time Havemeyer died. She was a wooden-hulled, steam-powered vessel. She was 106 feet (32 m) long, with a beam of 22 feet (6.7 m), and a draft of 10 feet (3.0 m), and her pumps could throw 6,000 gallons per minute. She was staffed by a crew of ten, and had accommodation for her crew to live on board. She cost $23,800.

== Operational life ==
=== Confrontation at the sanitation docks ===
On May 18, 1895, The New York Times reported on a confrontation between William Frederick Havemeyer and Restless, a tugboat chartered to the city's Sanitation Department. A fire had broken out at the Sanitation Department's "dumping wharf". The wharf, a large wooden wharf near 46th Street was used to load barges with the city's garbage. Tugboats, like Restless, would then tow the barges out to sea, where it was dumped.

A colony of homeless men the New York Times called "wharf rats", lived in spaces within the wharf, where they supported themselves by salvaging bottles, rags, and other refuse that had resale value. The New York Times blamed the fire on cooking fires the homeless men used to cook their breakfasts.

When William Frederick Havemeyer arrived at the wharf it found that Restless was already fighting the fire with its less powerful pumps. When Restless refused to get out of the way William Frederick Havemeyer turned its pumps on it. The New York Times reported that the smaller vessel was at risk of being swamped. The conflict between the two vessels consumed fifteen minutes, only ending when a senior fire department official convinced a senior Sanitation Department official to order Restless to get out of the way.

The fire was eventually extinguished when The New Yorker came to assist William Frederick Havemeyer.
