= James K. Polk 1844 presidential campaign =

American political campaign

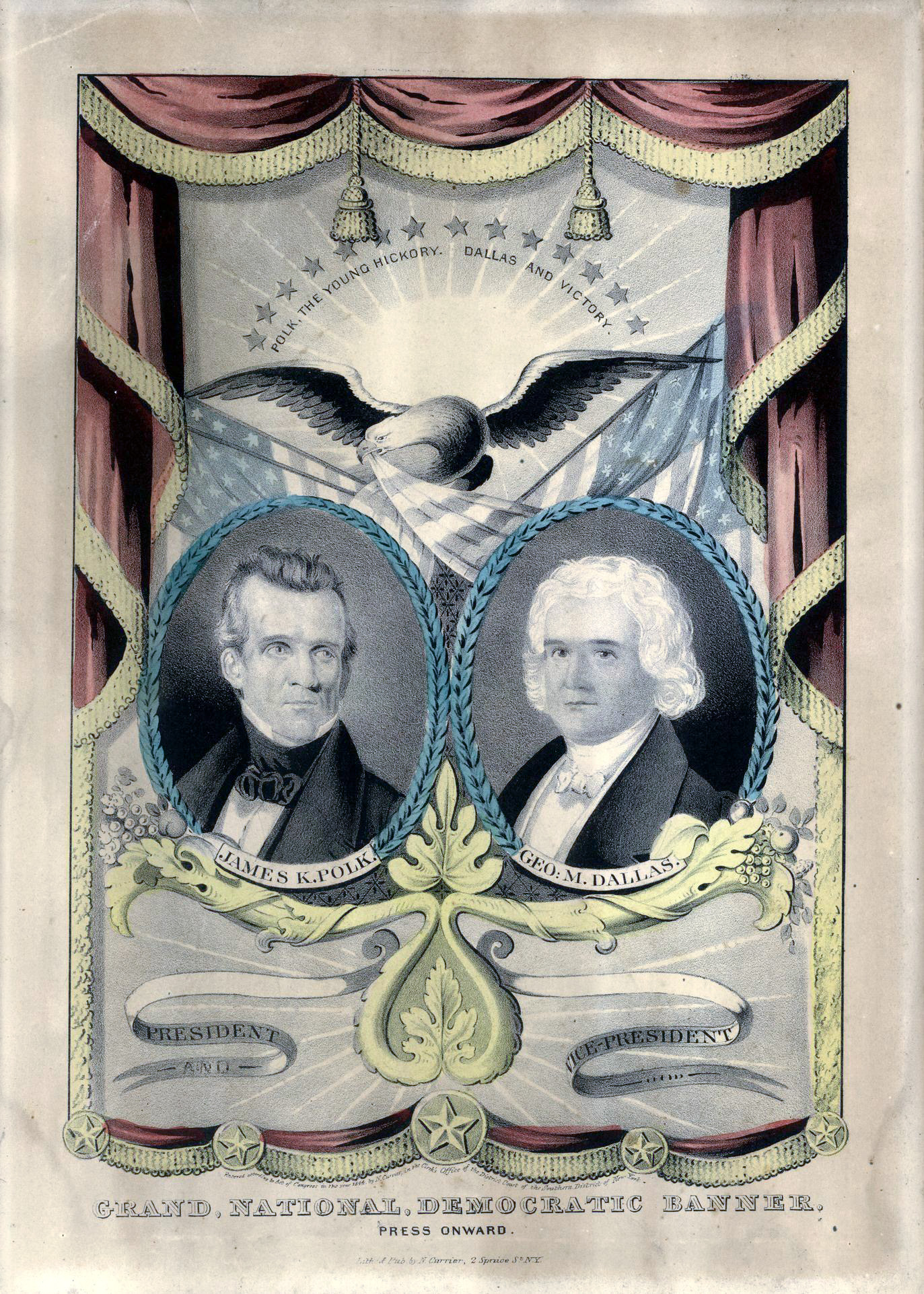
- Campaign: 1844 U.S. presidential election
- Candidate: James K. Polk; 9th Governor of Tennessee; (1839–1841); George M. Dallas; United States Senator from Pennsylvania; (1831–1833)
- Affiliation: Democratic
- Status: Won election: December 4, 1844; Inaugurated: March 4, 1845
- Key people: Andrew Jackson, John Tyler
- Slogan(s): Polk, Dallas, and the Tariff of 1842; 54-40 or fight Reannexation of Texas and Reoccupation of Oregon

The 1844 presidential campaign of James K. Polk, then both the former speaker of the United States House of Representatives and governor of Tennessee, was announced on May 27, 1844, in Baltimore, Maryland, however Polk had originally sought the vice-presidential nomination. At the 1844 Democratic National Convention on May 27, seven ballots were held before Polk was proposed as a compromise candidate and won on the ninth ballot.

On December 4, 1844, Polk defeated the Whig nominee, Henry Clay of Kentucky another former Speaker of the House, making him the President-elect. James K. Polk was elected President of the United States and George M. Dallas Vice President of the United States, with 170 of 275 electors.

== Pre-announcement ==
Prior to his entrance to politics Polk's family would be hosts to multiple guests of importance such as the future president, Andrew Jackson, who was a family friend. (Note: Samuel Polk died in 1827; his widow lived until 1852, surviving her oldest son by three years. See Dusinberre, p. xi.) In 1825 Polk entered national politics with his victory in Tennessee's 6th district and during the 1824 Presidential election Polk stood behind Jackson in his attempt to take the presidency. Eleven years later Speaker of the House Andrew Stevenson resigned and with the support of Jackson, Polk attempted to become the Speaker, but was defeated by John Bell, but Bell's victory would only last one year before Jackson used his massive support among the Jacksonians to make Polk Speaker of the House in December 1835. Polk would remain Speaker for four more years until he left Congress to run for governor of Tennessee which he held for one term before his defeat in 1841. Polk's hopes to enter the Executive branch started in 1840 when he hoped to become Martin Van Buren's vice president until he realized that the current vice president Richard M. Johnson was too popular to be replaced.

== 1844 Democratic National Convention ==
Martin Van Buren was the frontrunner for the Democratic nomination until he voiced his belief that Texas should not be annexed, costing him the support of the Southern Democrats which would prevent him from taking the nomination on the first ballot. As the ballots continued Lewis Cass's delegate count eventually overtook Van Buren's, but his lack of experience prevented him from taking the nomination. On the eighth presidential ballot George Bancroft proposed Polk as a compromise candidate and with the support of Andrew Jackson, took the nomination by the ninth ballot. For the vice-presidency Silas Wright was initially nominated, but he refused and was replaced by Pennsylvanian Senator George M. Dallas after he defeated John Fairfield on the third ballot.

== Outcome ==
Polk's support of Manifest Destiny successfully distanced him from the "southern crusade for slavery" which allowed him to receive support from the Western Democrats and anti-slavery Northerners giving him a surge in voter turnout for the Democratic party. Clay's refusal to take a stance on the issue of the annexation of Texas and James G. Birney's full hearted stance against annexation allowed enough of Clay's dishearten supports to switch to Birney. On December 1, 1844 the electoral college gave Polk the 170 electoral votes he won with 1,339,494 votes.

== Legacy ==
The expansion of the United States under Polk would inflame the issues of state's rights and slavery as the western territories attempted to become states in the 1850s. Coincidentally, Polk's actions would lead to the breakup of the Whig Party, the creation of the Republican Party, and a weakening of the Democratic Party for the next fifty years.

== See also ==
- Bibliography of James K. Polk
