= 1844 United States presidential election =

Election of James K. Polk

- November 1 – December 1, 1844

275 electoral votes of the Electoral College 138 electoral votes needed to win
- Turnout: 79.2% (▼1.1 pp)

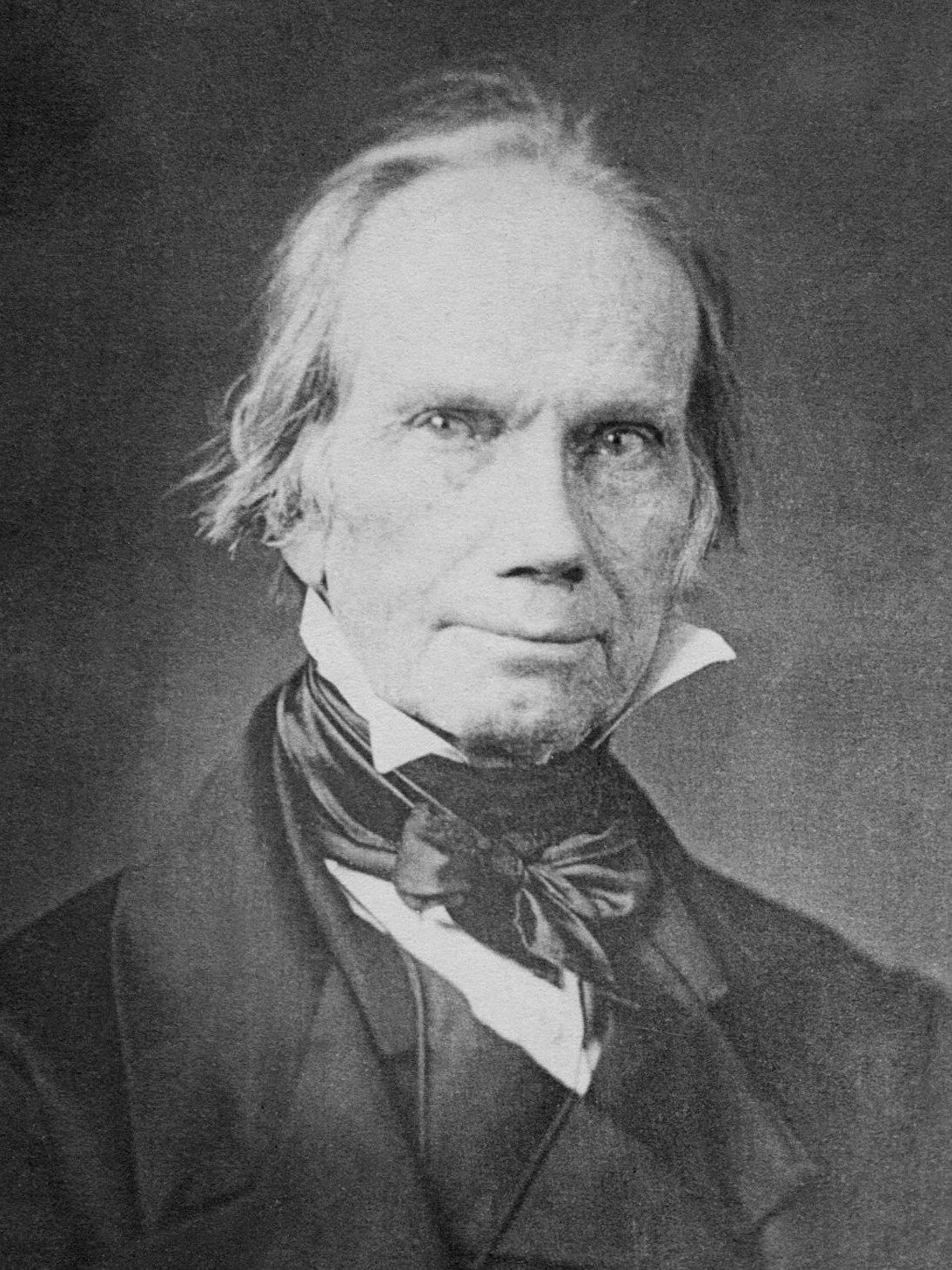
Nominee	James K. Polk	Henry Clay
Party	Democratic	Whig
Home state	Tennessee	Kentucky
Running mate	George M. Dallas (Note: Silas Wright had originally been nominated to serve as Polk's running mate; however, Wright declined the nomination and Dallas was chosen instead.)	Theodore Frelinghuysen
Electoral vote	170	105
States carried	15	11
Popular vote	1,339,494	1,300,005
Percentage	49.5%	48.1%
- Presidential election results map. Blue denotes states won by Polk/Dallas, Buff denotes those won by Clay/Frelinghuysen. Numbers indicate the number of electoral votes allotted to each state.
President before election
John Tyler
Independent
Elected President
James K. Polk
Democratic

A presidential election was held in the United States from November 1 to December 4, 1844. Democratic nominee James K. Polk narrowly defeated Whig nominee Henry Clay in a close contest turning on the controversial issues of slavery and the annexation of the Republic of Texas. This is the only election in which both major party nominees served as Speaker of the House at one point, and the first in which neither candidate held elective office at the time.

President John Tyler's pursuit of Texas annexation divided both major parties. Annexation would geographically expand American slavery. It also risked war with Mexico while the United States engaged in sensitive possession and boundary negotiations with Great Britain, which controlled Canada, over Oregon. Texas annexation thus posed both domestic and foreign policy risks. Both major parties had wings in the North and the South, but the possibility of the expansion of slavery threatened a sectional split in each party. Expelled by the Whig Party after vetoing key Whig legislation and lacking a firm political base, Tyler hoped to use the annexation of Texas to win the presidency as an independent or at least to have decisive, pro-Texas influence over the election.

The initial frontrunner for the Democratic nomination was former President Martin Van Buren, but his opposition to the annexation of Texas damaged his candidacy. Opposition from former President Andrew Jackson and most Southern delegations, plus a nomination rule change specifically aimed to block him, prevented Van Buren from winning the necessary two-thirds vote of delegates to the 1844 Democratic National Convention. The convention instead chose James K. Polk, former Governor of Tennessee and Speaker. He was the first successful dark horse for the presidency. Polk ran on a platform embracing popular commitment to expansion, often referred to as Manifest Destiny. Tyler dropped out of the race and endorsed Polk. The Whigs nominated Henry Clay, a famous, long-time party leader who was the early favorite but who conspicuously waffled on Texas annexation. Though a Southerner from Kentucky and a slave owner, Clay chose to focus on the risks of annexation while claiming not to oppose it personally. His awkward, repeated attempts to adjust and finesse his position on Texas confused and alienated voters, contrasting negatively with Polk's consistent clarity.

Polk successfully linked the dispute with Britain over Oregon with the Texas issue. The Democratic nominee thus united anti-slavery Northern expansionists, who demanded Oregon, with pro-slavery Southern expansionists who demanded Texas. In the national popular vote, Polk beat Clay by fewer than 40,000 votes, a margin of 1.4%. James G. Birney of the anti-slavery Liberty Party won 2.3% of the vote. The Electoral College winner was decided by New York where Polk won by just over 5,100 votes. Had Clay won the state, he would have won the presidency with 141 electoral votes to Polk's 134.

Birney's vote share in New York exceeded Polk's margin of victory over Clay, marking the first time a third party candidate vote share exceeded the margin of a winning candidate in a decisive state of a United States presidential election. After Polk's victory, Tyler annexed Texas, which was the proximate cause of the Mexican–American War during Polk's presidency.

== Background ==
=== Gag rule and Texas annexation controversies ===
Whigs and Democrats embarked upon their campaigns during the climax of the congressional gag rule controversies in 1844, which prompted Southern congressmen to suppress northern petitions to end the slave trade in the District of Columbia. Anti-annexation petitions to Congress sent from northern anti-slavery forces, including state legislatures, were similarly suppressed. Intra-party sectional compromises and maneuvering on slavery politics during these divisive debates placed significant strain on the northern and southern wings that comprised each political organization. The question as to whether the institution of slavery and its aristocratic principles of social authority were compatible with democratic republicanism was becoming "a permanent issue in national politics".

In 1836, a portion of the Mexican state of Coahuila y Tejas declared its independence to form the Republic of Texas. Texans, mostly American immigrants from the Deep South, many of whom owned slaves, sought to bring their republic into the Union as a state. At first, the subject of annexing Texas to the United States was shunned by both major American political parties. Although they recognized Texas sovereignty, Presidents Andrew Jackson (1829–1837) and Martin Van Buren (1837–1841) declined to pursue annexation. The prospect of bringing another slave state into the Union was fraught with problems. Both major parties – the Democrats and Whigs – viewed Texas statehood as something "not worth a foreign war [with Mexico]" or the "sectional combat" that annexation would provoke in the United States.

=== Tyler–Texas treaty ===
The incumbent President John Tyler, formerly vice-president, had assumed the presidency upon the death of William Henry Harrison in 1841. Tyler, a Whig in name only, emerged as a states' rights advocate committed to slavery expansion in defiance of Whig principles. After he vetoed the Whig domestic legislative agenda, he was expelled from his own party on September 13, 1841. Politically isolated, but unencumbered by party restraints, Tyler aligned himself with a small faction of Texas annexationists in a bid for election to a full term in 1844.

Tyler became convinced that Great Britain was encouraging a Texas–Mexico rapprochement that might lead to slave emancipation in the Texas republic. Accordingly, he directed Secretary of State Abel P. Upshur of Virginia to initiate, then relentlessly pursue, secret annexation talks with Texas minister to the United States Isaac Van Zandt, beginning on October 16, 1843.

Tyler submitted his Texas-U.S. treaty for annexation to the U.S. Senate, delivered April 22, 1844, where a two-thirds majority was required for ratification. The newly appointed Secretary of State John C. Calhoun of South Carolina (assuming his post March 29, 1844) included a document known as the Packenham Letter with the Tyler bill that was calculated to inject a sense of crisis in Southern Democrats of the Deep South. In it, he characterized slavery as a social blessing and the acquisition of Texas as an emergency measure necessary to safeguard the "peculiar institution" in the United States. In doing so, Tyler and Calhoun sought to unite the South in a crusade that would present the North with an ultimatum: support Texas annexation or lose the South. Anti-slavery Whigs considered Texas annexation particularly egregious, since Mexico had outlawed slavery in Coahuila y Tejas in 1829, before Texas independence had been declared.

The 1844 presidential campaigns evolved within the context of this struggle over Texas annexation, which was tied to the question of slavery expansion and national security. All candidates in the 1844 presidential election had to declare a position on this explosive issue.

== Nominations ==
=== Democratic Party convention and campaign ===
1844 Democratic Party ticket
James K. Polk	George M. Dallas
for President	for Vice President
13th Speaker Of The United States House of Representatives (1835–1839); 9th Governor of Tennessee (1839–1841)	United States Minister To Russia (1837–1839)
Campaign

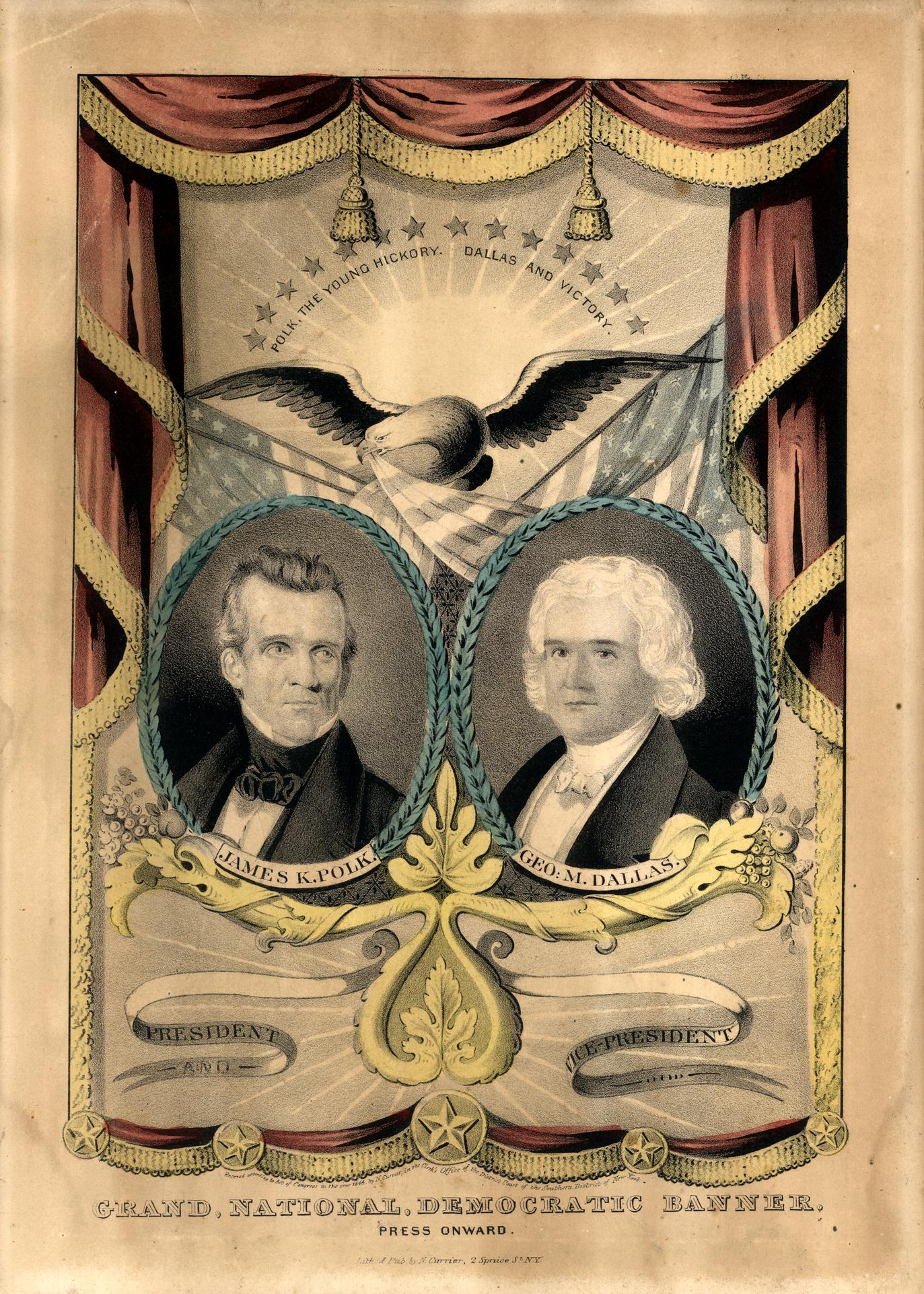
Grand National Democratic banner

Martin Van Buren, President of the United States between 1837 and 1841, and chief architect of Jacksonian democracy, was the presumptive Democratic presidential contender in the spring of 1844. With Secretary of State John C. Calhoun withdrawing his bid for the presidency in January 1844, the campaign was expected to focus on domestic issues. All this changed with the Tyler treaty. Van Buren regarded the Tyler annexation measure as an attempt to sabotage his bid for the White House by exacerbating the already strained North-South Democratic alliance regarding slavery expansion. Calhoun's Packenham Letter would serve to spur Democrats of the South to the task of forcing the Northern wing of the party to submit to Texas annexation, despite the high risk of "aggressively injecting slavery into their political campaign over Texas."

The annexation of Texas was the chief political issue of the day. Van Buren, initially the leading candidate, opposed immediate annexation because it might lead to a sectional crisis over the status of slavery in the West and lead to war with Mexico. This position cost Van Buren the support of southern and expansionist Democrats; as a result, he failed to win the nomination. The delegates likewise could not settle on Lewis Cass, the former Secretary of War, whose credentials also included past service as a U.S. minister to France.

On the eighth ballot, the historian George Bancroft, a delegate from Massachusetts, proposed former House Speaker James K. Polk as a compromise candidate. Polk argued that Texas and Oregon had always belonged to the United States by right. He called for "the immediate re-annexation of Texas" and for the "re-occupation" of the disputed Oregon territory.

On the next roll call, the convention unanimously accepted Polk, who became the first dark horse, or little-known, presidential candidate. The delegates selected Senator Silas Wright of New York for Vice President, but Wright, an admirer of Van Buren, declined the nomination to become the second person to decline a vice presidential nomination. The Democrats then nominated George M. Dallas, a Pennsylvania lawyer.

==== Martin Van Buren's Hammett letter ====
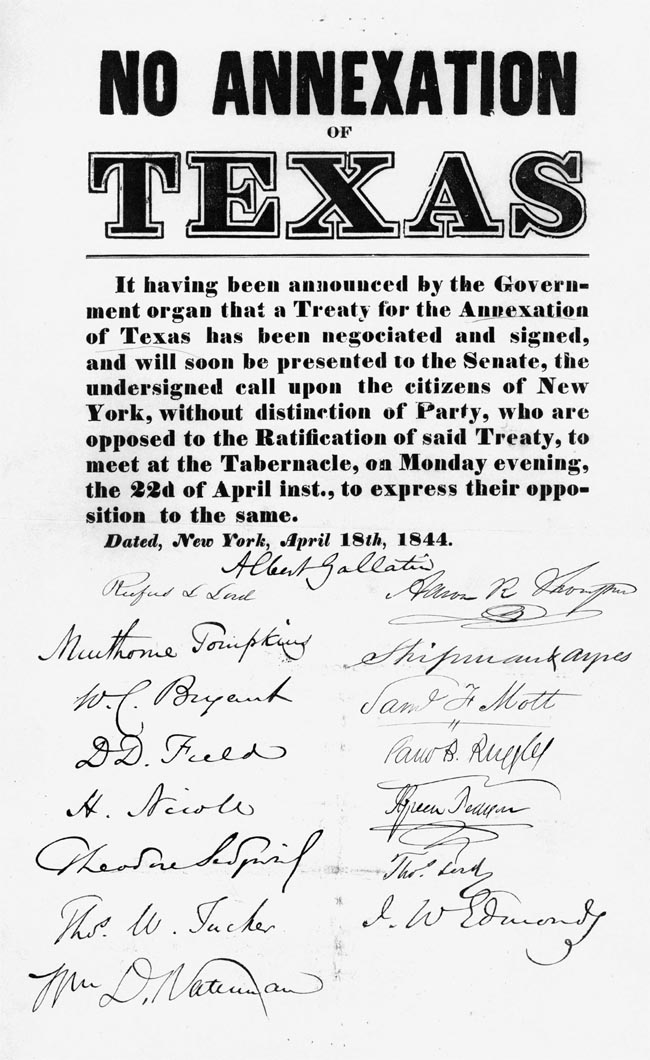
Anti-annexation poster, New York City, April 1844. Albert Gallatin presided over the event.

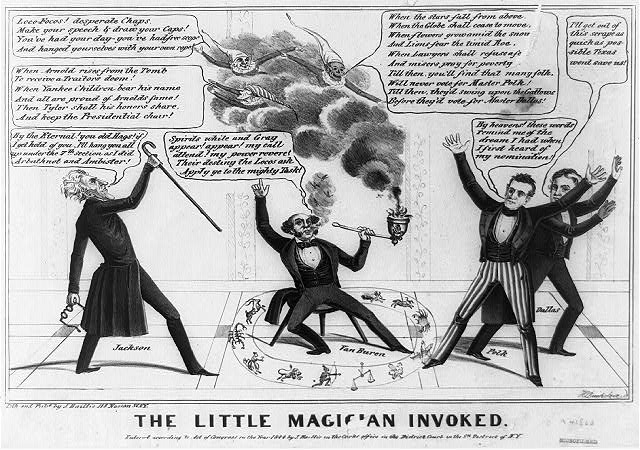
Martin Van Buren summons spirits to divine the Democratic or Loco Foco prospects for election in 1844.

Van Buren realized that accommodating slavery expansionists in the South would open the Northern Democrats to charges of appeasement to the Slave power from the strongly anti-annexation Northern Whigs and some Democrats. He crafted an emphatically anti-Texas position that temporized with expansionist southern Democrats, laying out a highly conditional scenario that delayed Texas annexation indefinitely. In the Hammett letter, published April 27, 1844 (penned April 20), he counseled his party to reject Texas under a Tyler administration. Furthermore, annexation of Texas as a territory would proceed, tentatively, under a Van Buren administration, only when the American public had been consulted on the matter and Mexico's cooperation had been pursued to avoid an unnecessary war. A military option might be advanced if a groundswell of popular support arose for Texas, certified with a congressional mandate. In these respects, Martin Van Buren differed from Henry Clay, who would never tolerate annexation without Mexico's assent.

With the publication of Clay's Raleigh Letter and Van Buren's Hammett letter, Van Burenite Democrats hoped that their candidate's posture on Texas would leave southern pro-annexationists with exactly one choice for president: Martin Van Buren. In this, they misjudged the political situation. Tyler and the southern pro-annexationists posed a potentially far greater threat than Clay, in that the Tyler-Calhoun treaty would put immense pressure on the northern Democrats to comply with southern Democrats' demands for Texas.

The Hammett letter utterly failed to reassure Middle and Deep South extremists who had responded favorably to Calhoun's Pakenham Letter. A minority of the southern Democrat leadership remained obdurate that Northern Democratic legislators would ignore their constituents' opposition to slavery expansion and unite in support of Texas annexation once exposed to sufficient southern pressure.

The extent to which Southern Democrat support for Martin Van Buren had eroded over the Texas annexation crisis became evident when Van Buren's southern counterpart in the rise of the Democratic Party, Thomas Ritchie of the Richmond Enquirer, terminated their 20-year political alliance in favor of immediate annexation.

==== Andrew Jackson calls for annexation of Texas ====
Former President Andrew Jackson publicly announced his support for immediate Texas annexation in May 1844. Jackson had facilitated Tyler's Texas negotiations in February 1844 by reassuring Sam Houston, the President of Texas, that the U.S. Senate ratification was likely. As the Senate debated the Tyler treaty, Jackson declared that the popular support among Texans for annexation should be respected, and any delay would result in a British dominated Texas Republic that would promote slave emancipation and pose a foreign military threat to the southwest United States.

The former military hero went further, urging all Jacksonian Democrats to block Martin Van Buren from the party ticket and seek a Democratic presidential candidate fully committed to the immediate annexation of Texas. In doing so, Jackson abandoned the traditional Jeffersonian-Jacksonian formula that had required its Northern and Southern wings to compromise on constitutional slavery disputes.

The Texas issue was fracturing Van Buren's support among Democrats and would derail his candidacy.

==== Democratic Party campaign tactics ====
Historian Sean Wilentz describes some of the Democrat campaign tactics:

In the South, Democrats played racist politics and smeared Clay as a dark skin-loving abolitionist, while in the North, they defamed him as a debauched, dueling, gambling, womanizing, irreligious hypocrite whose reversal on the bank issue proved he had no principles. They also pitched their nominees to particular local followings, having Polk hint preposterously, in a letter to a Philadelphian, that he favored "reasonable" tariff protection for domestic manufactures, while they attacked the pious humanitarian Frelinghuysen as an anti-Catholic bigot and crypto-nativist enemy of the separation of church and state. To ensure the success of their southern strategy, the Democrats also muffled John Tyler.

Polk furthermore pledged to serve only one term as president. He would keep this promise, and would die less than three months after leaving office.

=== Senate vote on the Tyler-Texas treaty ===
The annexation treaty needed a two-thirds vote and was easily defeated in the Senate, largely along partisan lines, 16 to 35 – a two-thirds majority against passage – on June 8, 1844. Whigs voted 27–1 against the treaty: all northern Whig senators voted nay, and fourteen of fifteen southern Whig senators had joined them. Democrats voted for the treaty 15–8, with a slight majority of Northern Democrats opposing. Southern Democrats affirmed the treaty 10–1, with only one slave state senator, Thomas Hart Benton, voting against.

Three days later, Tyler and his supporters in Congress began exploring means to bypass the supermajority requirement for Senate treaty approval. Substituting the constitutional protocols for admitting regions of the United States into the Union as states, Tyler proposed that alternative, yet constitutional, means be used to bring the Republic of Texas – a foreign country – into the Union.

Tyler and Calhoun, formerly staunch supporters of minority safeguards based on the supermajority requirements for national legislation, now altered their position to facilitate passage of the Tyler treaty. Tyler's attempt to evade the Senate vote launched a spirited congressional debate.

=== Whig Party convention and campaign ===
1844 Whig Party ticket
Henry Clay	Theodore Frelinghuysen
for President	for Vice President
7th Speaker of the House (1811–1814, 1815–1820, 1823–1825)	2nd Chancellor Of New York University (1839–1850)

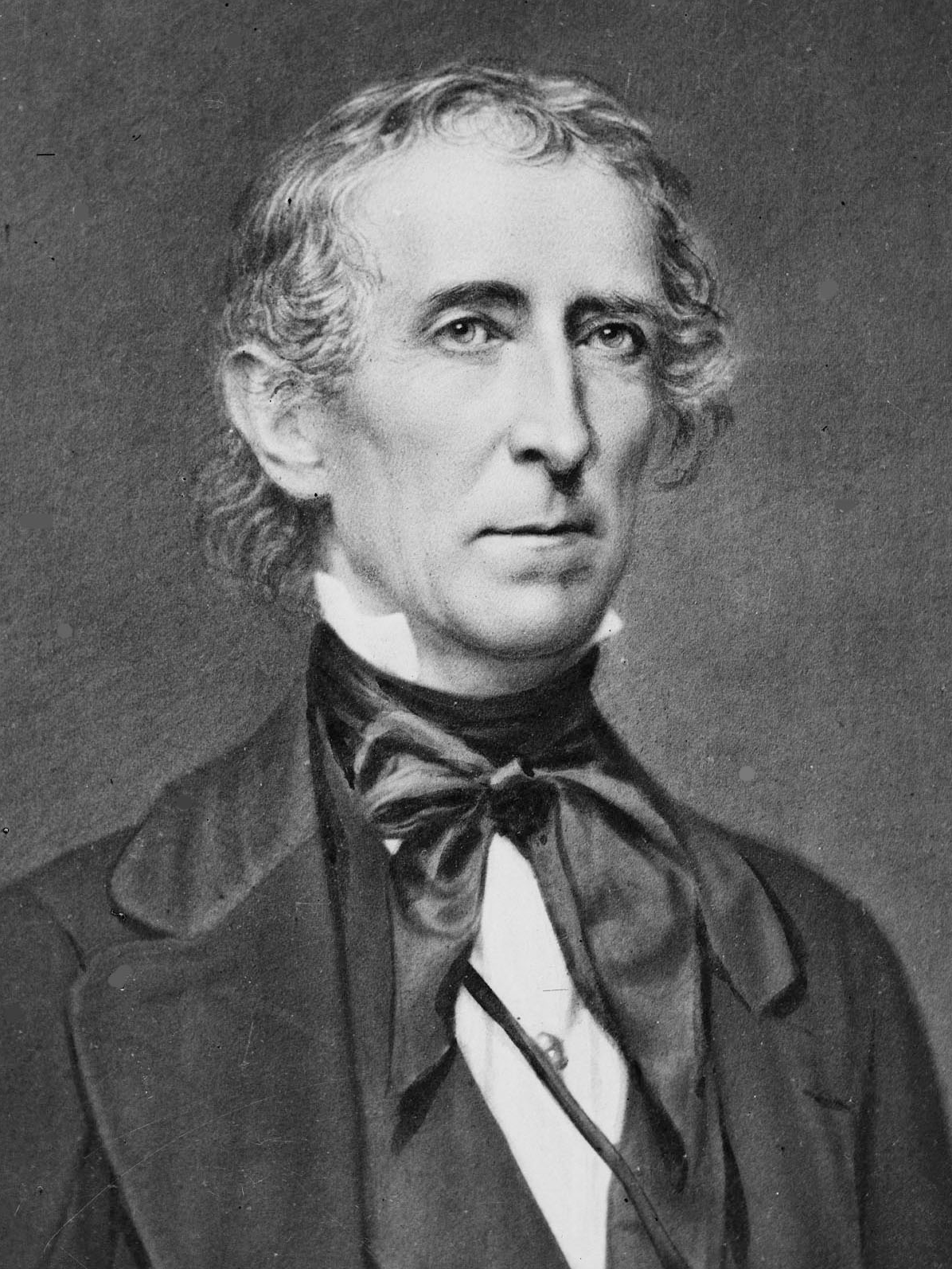
John Tyler, the incumbent president in 1844, whose partial term expired on March 4, 1845

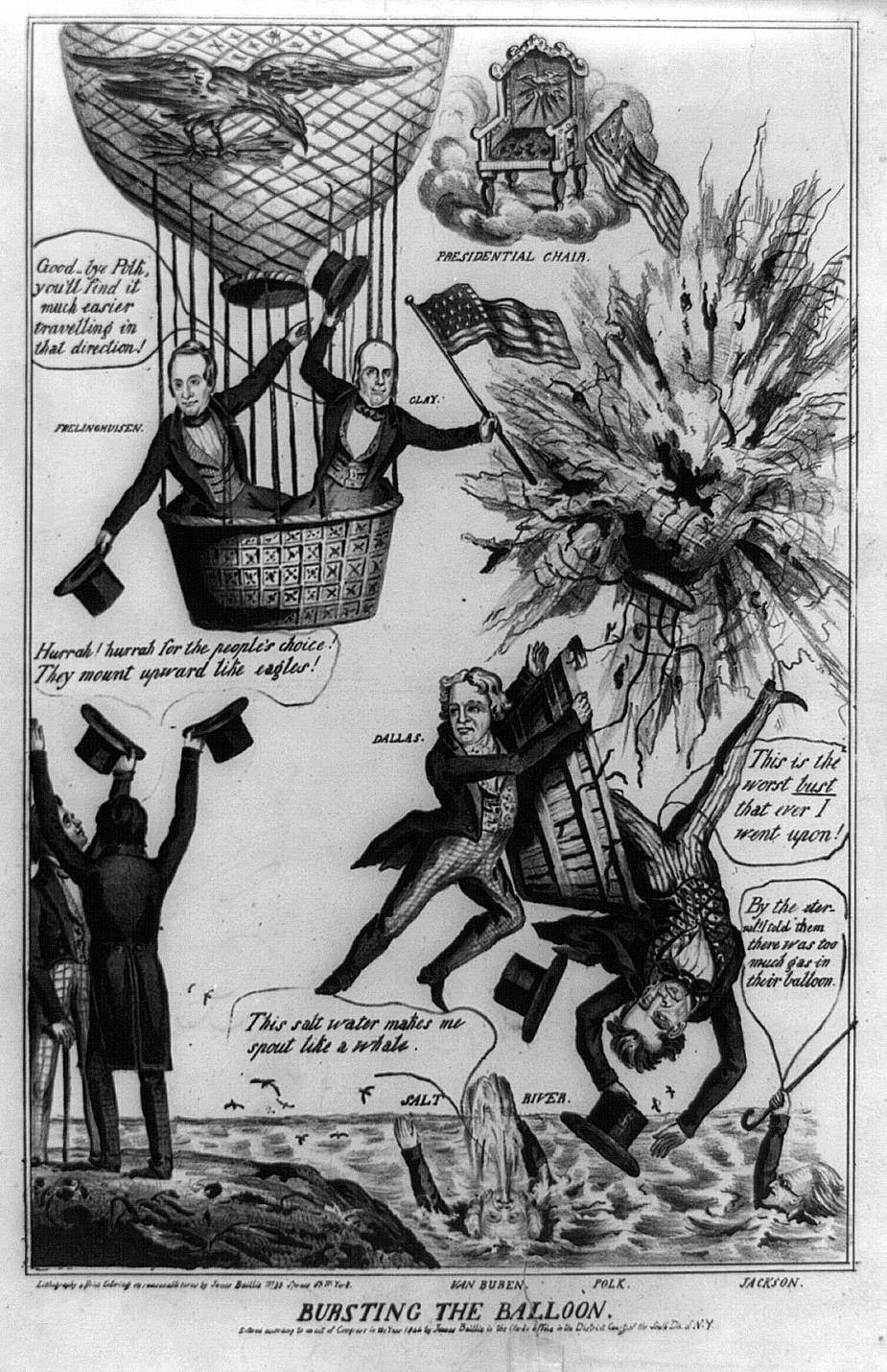
Political cartoon predicting Polk's defeat by Clay

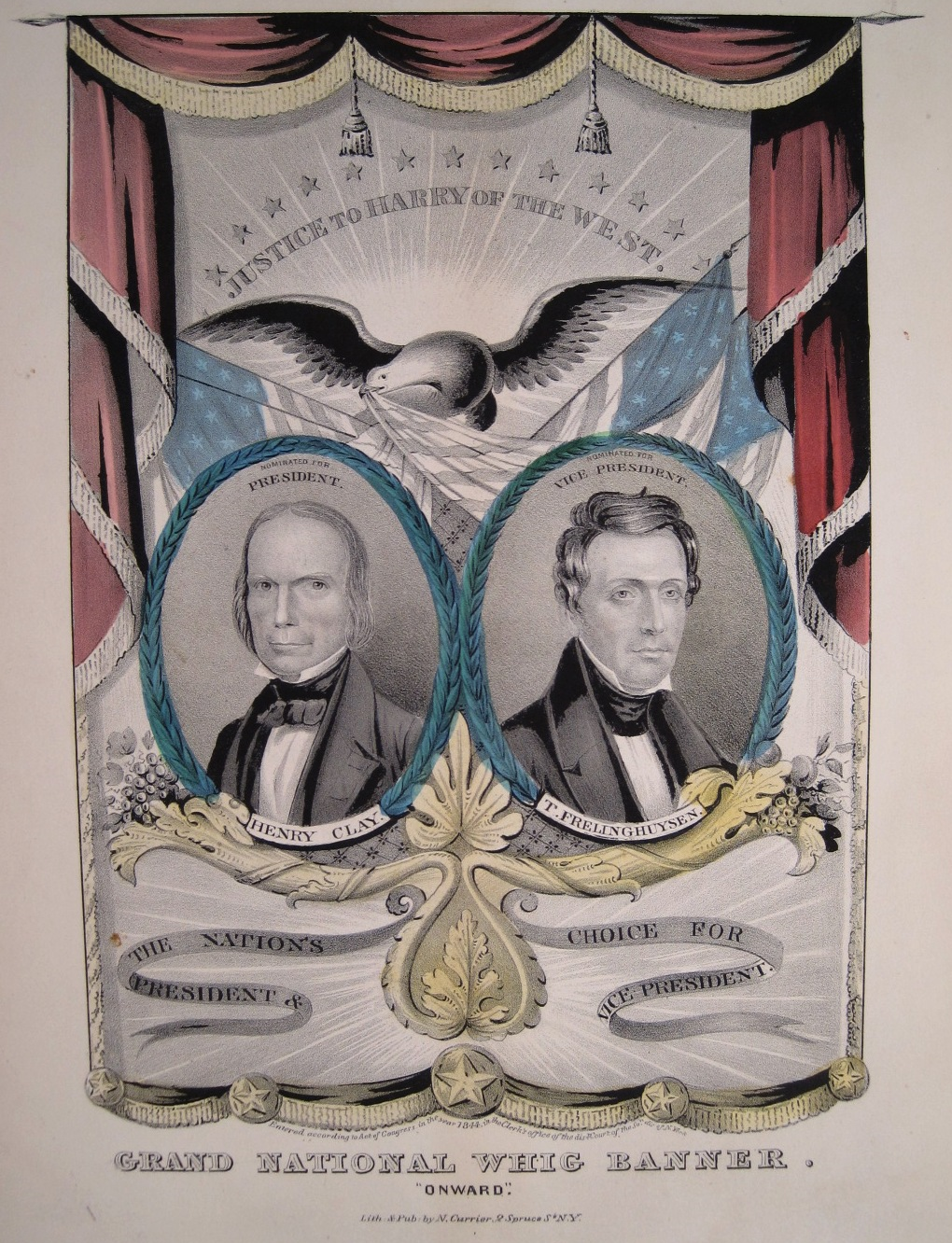
Grand National Whig banner

Henry Clay of Kentucky, effectively the leader of the Whig Party since its inception in 1834, was selected as its nominee at the party's convention in Baltimore, Maryland, on May 1, 1844. Clay, a slaveholder, presided over a party in which its Southern wing was sufficiently committed to the national platform to put partisan loyalties above slavery expansionist proposals that might undermine its north–south alliance. Whigs felt confident that Clay could duplicate Harrison's landslide victory of 1840 against any opposition candidate.

Southern Whigs feared that the acquisition of the fertile lands in Texas would produce a huge market for slave labor, inflating the price of slaves and deflating land values in their home states. Northern Whigs feared that Texas statehood would initiate the opening of a vast "Empire for Slavery".

Two weeks before the Whig convention in Baltimore, in reaction to Calhoun's Packenham Letter, Clay issued a document known as the Raleigh Letter (issued April 17, 1844) that presented his views on Texas to his fellow southern Whigs. In it, he flatly denounced the Tyler annexation bill and predicted that its passage would provoke a war with Mexico, whose government had never recognized Texas independence. Clay underlined his position, warning that even with Mexico's consent, he would block annexation in the event that substantial sectional opposition existed anywhere in the United States.

The Whig party leadership was acutely aware that any proslavery legislation advanced by its southern wing would alienate its anti-slavery northern wing and cripple the party in the general election. In order to preserve their party, Whigs would need to stand squarely against acquiring a new slave state. As such, Whigs were content to restrict their 1844 campaign platform to less divisive issues such as internal improvements and national finance.

Whigs picked Theodore Frelinghuysen of New Jersey – "the Christian Statesman" – as Clay's running mate. An advocate of the colonization of emancipated slaves, he was acceptable to southern Whigs as an opponent of the abolitionists. His pious reputation balanced Clay's image as a slave-holding, hard-drinking duelist. Their party slogan was "Hurray, Hurray, the Country's Risin' – Vote for Clay and Frelinghuysen!" In Tennessee, recalled one memoirist, "They organized all sorts of companies, such as the 'Clay Slashers', the 'Coon Hunters', etc. The Clay Slashers were composed of cavalry dressed in white pantaloons and gay plaid hunting-shirts. They wore caps with white plumes striped with red in them, and a blue silk sash. They had badges made with white ribbon with Clay's picture printed on them, and fastened to the sash with a white rosette. There was a long frame put on wheels, and a log cabin built on it, with a door with the latch and string put on the outside. Inside the cabin there was a barrel of cider which they sold as they marched through the streets, singing and blowing a long tin horn: 'Git out the way, you Polk-stalk pizen; you can't beat Clay and Frelinghuysen.'"

==== Henry Clay's Alabama letter ====
On July 27, 1844, Clay released a position statement, the so-called "Alabama Letter." In it, he counseled his Whig constituency to regard Texas annexation and statehood as merely a short phase in the decline of slavery in the United States, rather than a long term advance for the Slave Power. Clay qualified his stance on Texas annexation, declaring "no personal objection to the annexation" of the republic. He would move back to his original orientation in September 1844. Northern Whigs expressed outrage at any détente with the Slave Power and accused him of equivocating on Texas annexation.

Clay's central position, however, had not altered: no annexation without northern acquiescence. Clay's commitment brought Southern Whigs under extreme pressure in their home states and congressional districts, threatening to tarnish their credentials as supporters of slavery.

==== Whig Party campaign tactics ====
Historian Sean Wilentz describes some of the Whig campaign tactics:

"The Whigs countered Democratic attacks by revving up the Log Cabin electioneering machinery and redeploying it on behalf of the man they now celebrated as 'Ol'Coon' Clay. They also attacked former House Speaker Polk as nobody who deep down was a dangerous Loco Foco radical...With greater success, the Whigs linked up with resurgent nativist anti-Catholic movement strongest in New York and Pennsylvania, and planted stories that as president, Clay would tighten up immigration and naturalization laws. (Too late, Clay tried to distance himself from the nativists.)" "The Liberty Party added to the confusion...Clay became the object of nasty abolitionist attacks. One notorious handbill, widely reprinted, by an abolitionist minister Abel Brown, denounced Clay as a "Man Stealer, Slaveholder, and Murdurer," and accused him of "Selling Jesus Christ!" because he dealt in slaves. With the campaign to be decided at the electoral margins, Whig managers grew so concerned that, late in the campaign, they concocted a fraudulent letter that supposedly proved that James Birney was secretly working in league with the Democrats, and circulated it in New York and Ohio."

=== Other nominations ===
==== John Tyler ====
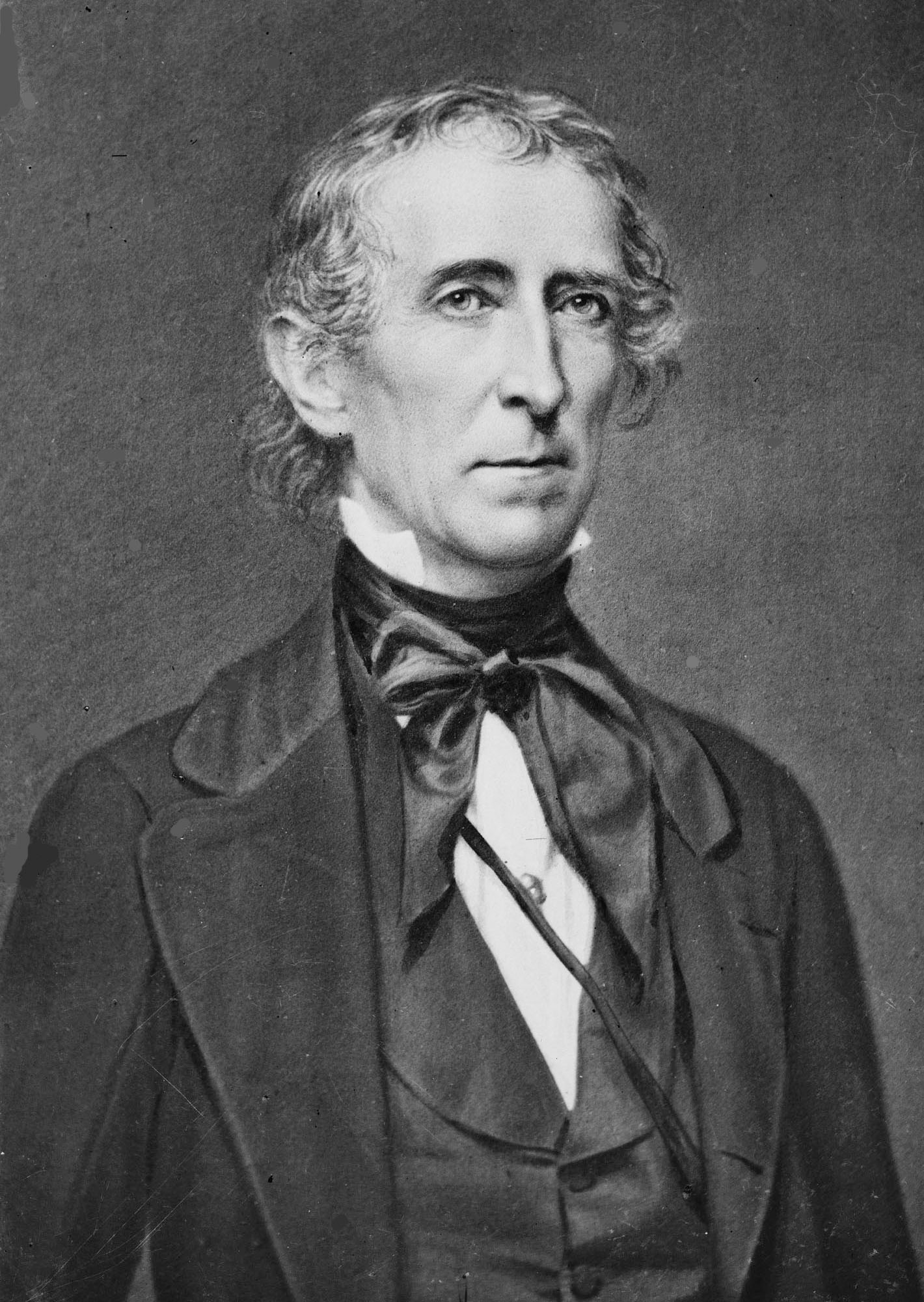
Incumbent President John Tyler, the Democratic-Republican Party presidential nominee

After the closed session Senate debates on the Tyler-Texas treaty were leaked to the public on April 27, 1844, President Tyler's only hope of success in influencing passage of his treaty was to intervene directly as a spoiler candidate in the 1844 election. His "Democratic-Republican Party", a recycling of the name of Jefferson's party, held its convention on May 27, 1844, in Baltimore, Maryland, a short distance from the unfolding Democratic Party convention that would select James K. Polk as nominee. Tyler was nominated the same day without challenge, accepting the honor on May 30, 1844. The Tyler delegates did not designate a vice-presidential running mate.

Democratic Party nominee James K. Polk was faced with the possibility that a Tyler ticket might shift votes away from the Democrats and provide Clay with the margin of victory in a close race. Tyler made clear in his nomination acceptance speech that his overriding concern was the ratification of his Texas annexation treaty. Moreover, he hinted that he would drop out of the race once that end was assured, informing Polk, through Senator Robert J. Walker of Mississippi, that his campaign efforts were simply a vehicle to mobilize support for Texas annexation. Tyler concentrated his resources in the states of New York, Pennsylvania and New Jersey, all highly contested states in the election. Securing enough Democratic support, his withdrawal might prove indispensable to Polk.

Polk was receptive as long as Tyler could withdraw without raising suspicion of a secret bargain. To solidify Tyler's cooperation, Polk enlisted Andrew Jackson to reassure Tyler that Texas annexation would be consummated under a Polk administration. On August 20, 1844, Tyler dropped out of the presidential race, and Tylerites moved quickly to support the Democratic Party nominee.

==== Liberty Party ====
The Liberty Party held its 1843 national convention on August 30 in Buffalo, New York, with 148 delegates from twelve states in attendance. James G. Birney, the party's presidential nominee in the 1840 election, was renominated with 108 votes on the first ballot (Thomas Morris and William Jay received 2 and 1 votes respectively). Morris would go on to be nominated for vice-president with 83 votes compared to Gerrit Smith's 22 and Alvan Stewart's 1. The party received 2.3% of the popular vote in the election, which was the highest it ever received.

==== Joseph Smith ====
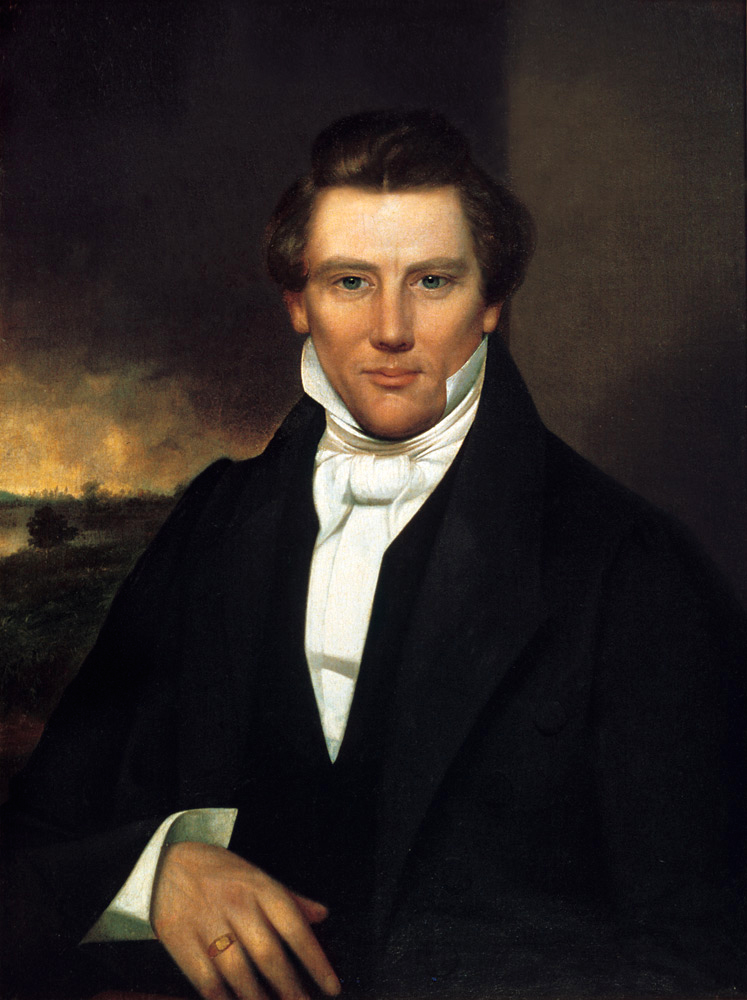
Joseph Smith

Joseph Smith, the mayor of Nauvoo, Illinois, and founder of the Latter-day Saint movement, ran as an independent under the newly created Reform Party with Sidney Rigdon as his running mate. He proposed the abolition of slavery through compensation by selling public lands and decreasing the size and salary of Congress; the closure of prisons; the annexation of Texas, Oregon, and parts of Canada; the securing of international rights on high seas; free trade; and the re-establishment of a national bank. His top aide Brigham Young campaigned for Smith saying, "He it is that God of Heaven designs to save this nation from destruction and preserve the Constitution." The campaign ended when he was attacked and killed by a mob while in the Carthage, Illinois, jail on June 27, 1844.

== Results ==
30.6% of the voting age population and 79% of eligible voters participated in the election. Polk's adoption of Manifest Destiny paid dividends at the polls. No longer identified with the Tyler-Calhoun "southern crusade for slavery", the western Democrats could embrace Texas annexation. The Democrats enjoyed a huge upsurge in voter turnout, up to 20% over the figures from 1840, especially in the Northwest and Mid-Atlantic regions. The Whigs showed only a 4% increase.

It was written in the book The life of James Knox Polk (1850) that former President Jackson made it a point to come out and vote in the election:

General Jackson was always warmly attached to Mr. Polk : he looked upon him something in the light of a 'protoge and took a deep interest in his political advancement. His feelings were often manifested in a manner that could not be mistaken, and particularly so at the presidential election in 1844, when, though trembling on the verge of the grave, he appeared at the polls, and deposited his ballot in favor of the republican candidates, James K. Polk and George M. Dallas.

The Democrats won Michigan, Illinois, and Indiana and nearly took Ohio, where the concept of Manifest Destiny was most admired. In the Deep South, Clay lost every state to Polk, a huge reversal from the 1840 race, but carried most of the Middle and Border South. Clay's "waffling" on Texas may have cost him the 41 electoral votes of New York and Michigan. The former slaveholder, now abolitionist, James Birney of the Liberty Party, received 15,812 and 3,632 votes, respectively, based on his unwavering stand against Texas annexation.

Celebratory shots rang out in Washington on November 7 as returns came in from western New York which clinched the state and the presidency for Polk. Polk won by a mere 5,106 out of 470,062 cast in New York, and only 3,422 out of 52,096 votes in Michigan. Had enough of these voting blocks cast their ballots for the anti-annexationist Clay in New York, he would have defeated Polk. Still, Clay's opposition to annexation and western slavery expansion served him well among Northern Whigs and nearly secured him the election.

As of 2024, Clay was the third of eight presidential nominees to win a significant number of electoral votes in at least three elections, the others being Thomas Jefferson, Andrew Jackson, Grover Cleveland, William Jennings Bryan, Franklin D. Roosevelt, Richard Nixon, and Donald Trump. Of these, Jackson, Cleveland, and Roosevelt also won the popular vote in at least three elections. Clay and Bryan are the only two candidates to lose the presidency three times.

This is the most recent presidential election where the election took place on different days in different states. It is the only presidential election in which both major party nominees were former Speakers of the House. This was the last election in which Ohio voted for the Whigs. It was also the only presidential election in which the winner, Polk, lost both his birth state of North Carolina and his state of residence, Tennessee, (which he lost by only 123 votes) before Donald Trump's victory in the 2016 presidential election. This was the first of four times that a victorious candidate lost their home state followed by 1916, 1968, and 2016.

=== Consequences ===
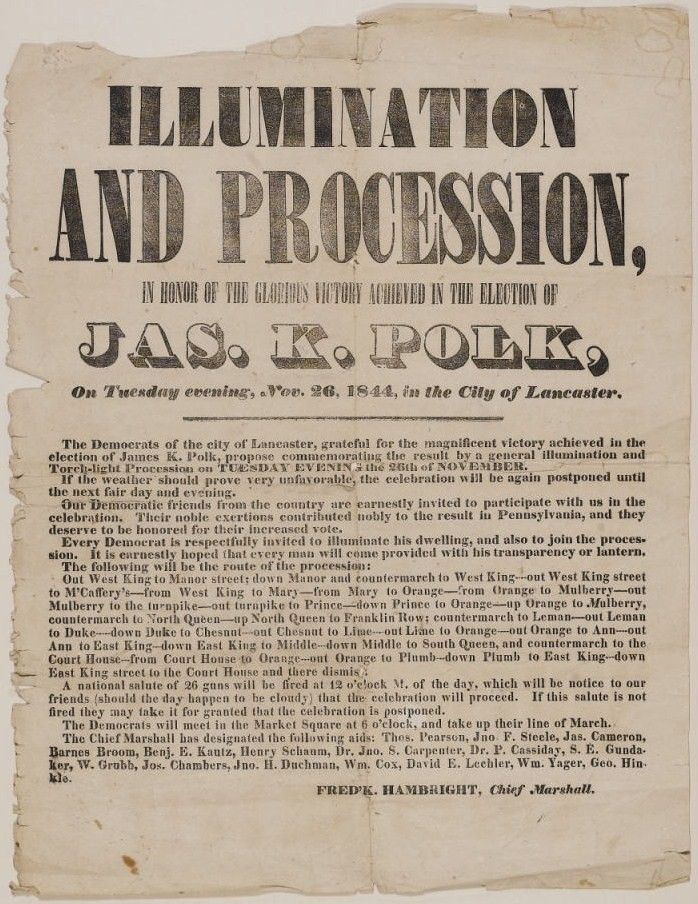
Broadside announcing torchlight victory parade in Lancaster, Pennsylvania

Polk's election confirmed that Manifest Destiny had majority support in the electorate despite Whig opposition. The annexation of Texas was formalized on March 1, 1845, days before Polk took office. Mexico refused to accept the annexation and the Mexican–American War broke out in 1846. Instead of demanding all of Oregon, Polk compromised. Washington and London negotiated the Buchanan–Pakenham Treaty, which split up the Oregon Territory between the two countries.

=== Allegations of fraud ===
Upon the conclusion of the election, Whig publications were disheartened at Henry Clay's loss against Polk's alleged fraud. The Whig Almanac, a yearly collection of political statistics and events of interest to the party, contained in 1845 a column alleging fraud in Louisiana. It noted that, in one Louisiana parish, Plaquemines, the vote tally exploded from a 240 to 40 vote victory for the Van Buren ticket in 1840 to a 1007 to 37 vote victory for the Polk ticket in 1844. The 970 vote margin was greater than Polk's margin statewide. The 1,007 votes received by Polk exceeded the total number of all white males in the parish in 1840, despite Louisiana having a property requirement to vote. A steward, pilot, and passenger of the steamboat Agnes reportedly said that the ship ferried voters from New Orleans to Plaquemines parish where the steward was pushed by the Captain to vote for the Polk ticket three times, despite not being of voting age. A man named Charles Bruland was seen driven out of the voting booth wounded and bloody after attempting to cast a vote for the Clay ticket in Plaquemines Parish.

Ultimately, these allegations of fraud would not have changed the election (though the Whig Almanac makes a slippery slope argument that if this fraud occurred in Louisiana, it must also have occurred in New York, which had Clay won he would have won the election), as Louisiana switching its vote would make the final count 164 electoral vote for Polk to 111 for Clay.

Electoral results
Presidential candidate	Party	Home state	Popular vote^{(a)}		Electoral vote	Running mate		
Presidential candidate	Party	Home state	Count	Percentage	Electoral vote	Vice-presidential candidate	Home state	Electoral vote
James K. Polk	Democratic	Tennessee	1,339,494	49.54%	170	George M. Dallas	Pennsylvania	170
Henry Clay	Whig	Kentucky	1,300,004	48.08%	105	Theodore Frelinghuysen	New York	105
James G. Birney	Liberty	Michigan	62,103	2.30%	0	Thomas Morris	Ohio	0
Other			2,058	0.08%	—	Other		—
Total			2,703,659	100%	275			275
Needed to win					138			138

Source (Popular vote): Leip, David. "1844 Presidential Election Results". Dave Leip's Atlas of U.S. Presidential Elections.
Source (Electoral vote): "Electoral College Box Scores 1789–1996". National Archives and Records Administration.
^{(a)} The popular vote figures exclude South Carolina where the Electors were chosen by the state legislature rather than by popular vote.

Popular vote
Polk	49.54%
Clay	48.08%
Birney	2.30%
Others	0.08%

Electoral vote
Polk	61.81%
Clay	38.18%

=== Cartographic gallery ===
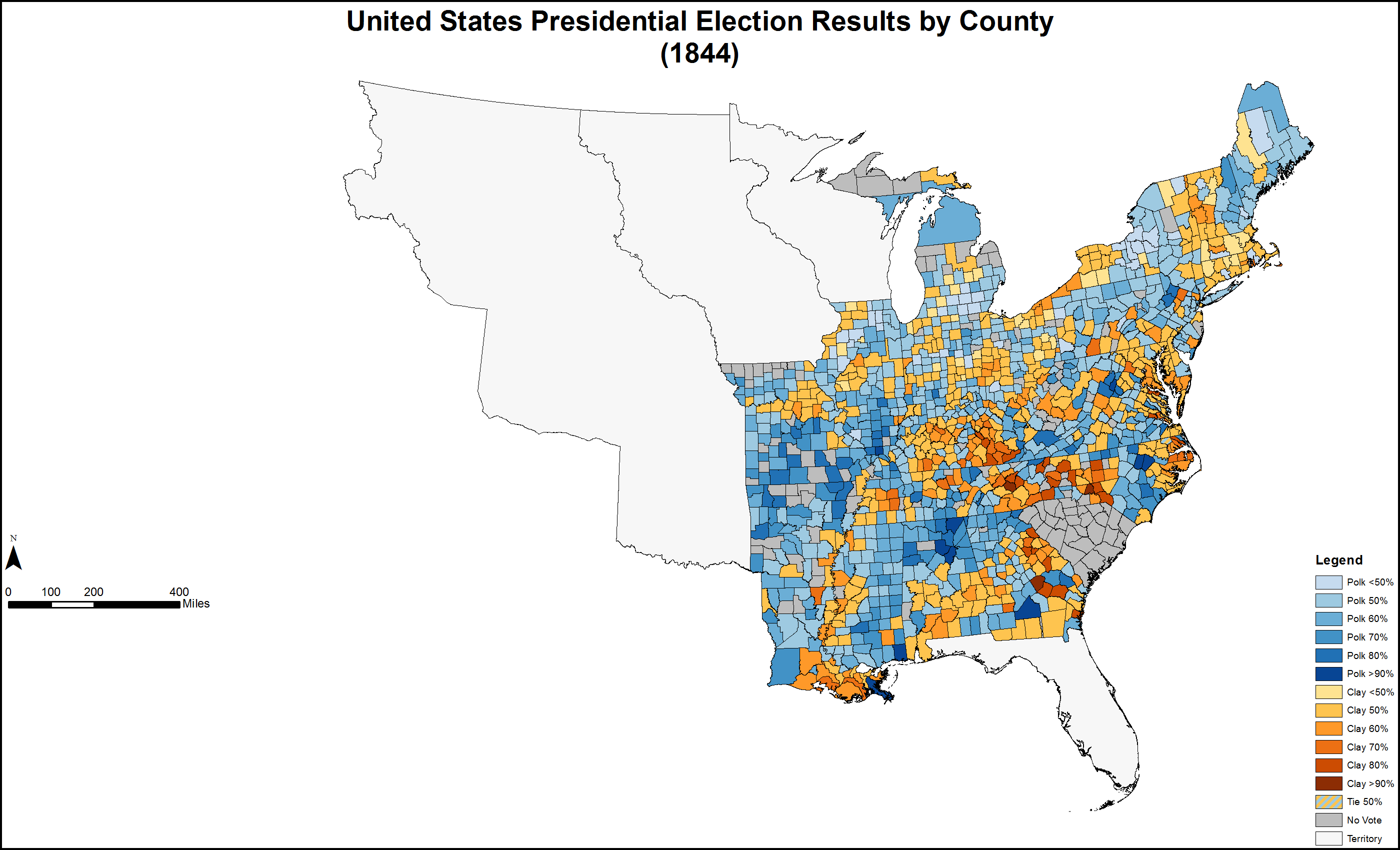
Results by county, shaded according to winning candidate's percentage of the vote

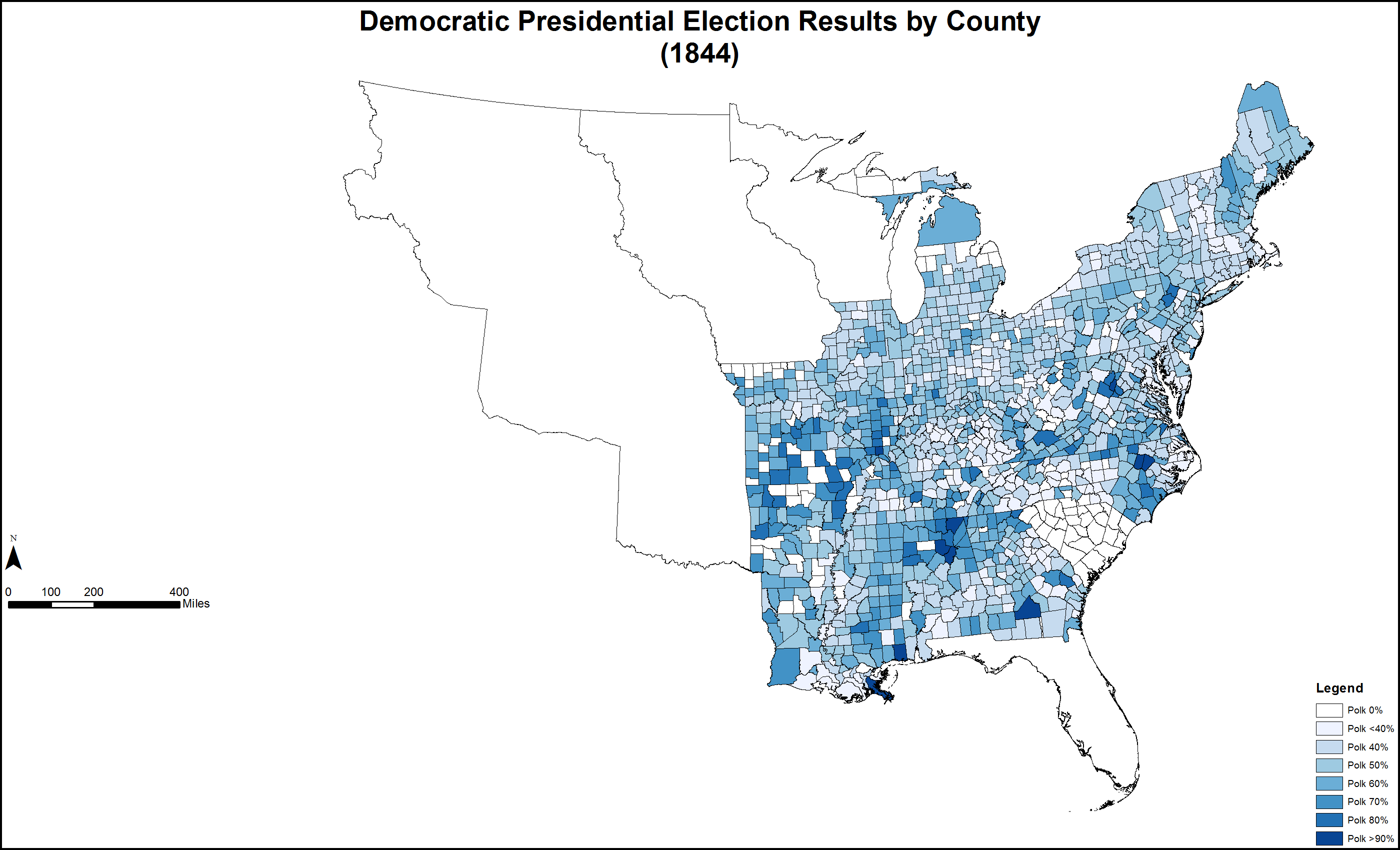
Results by county, shaded according to percentage of the vote for Polk

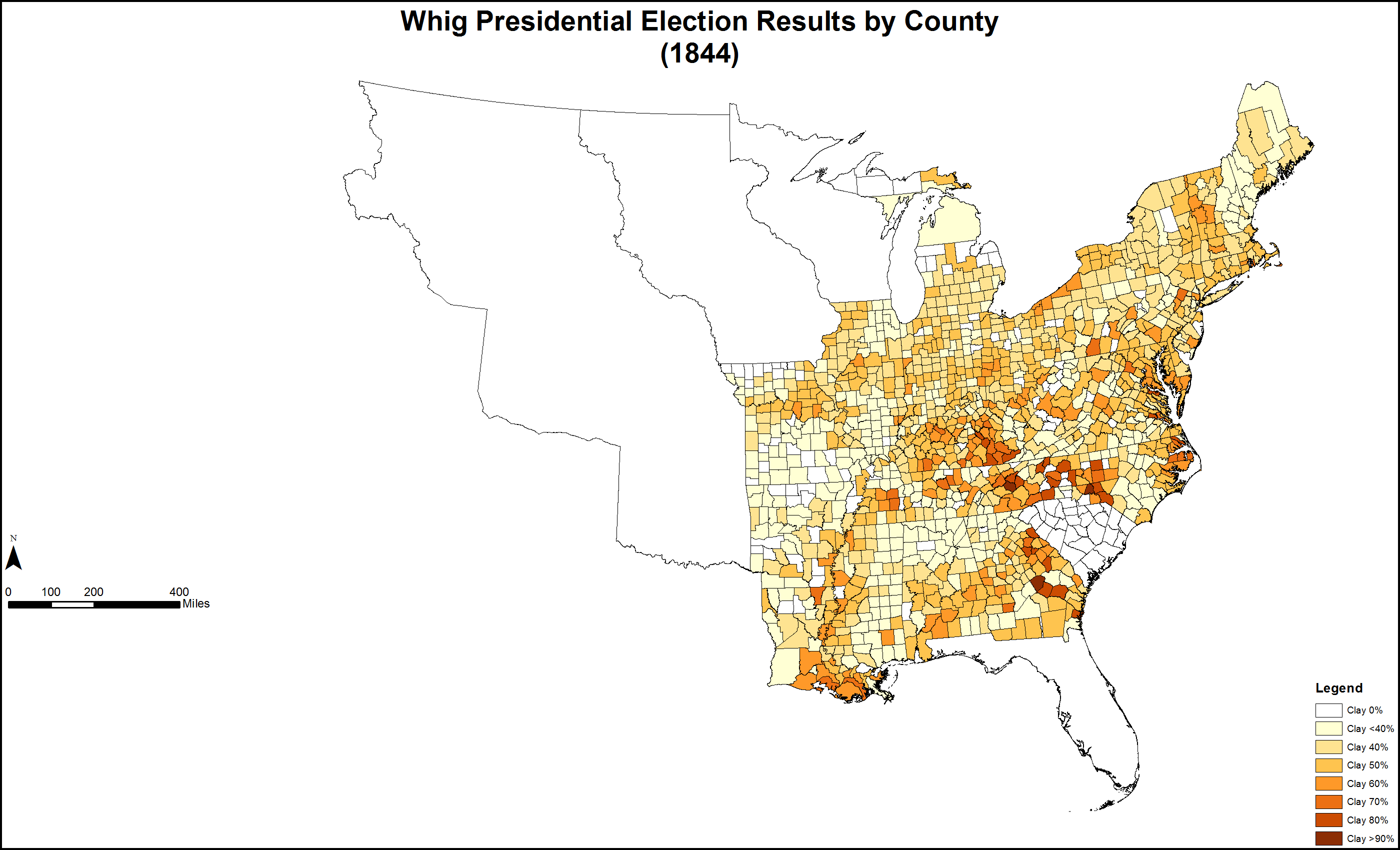
Results by county, shaded according to percentage of the vote for Clay

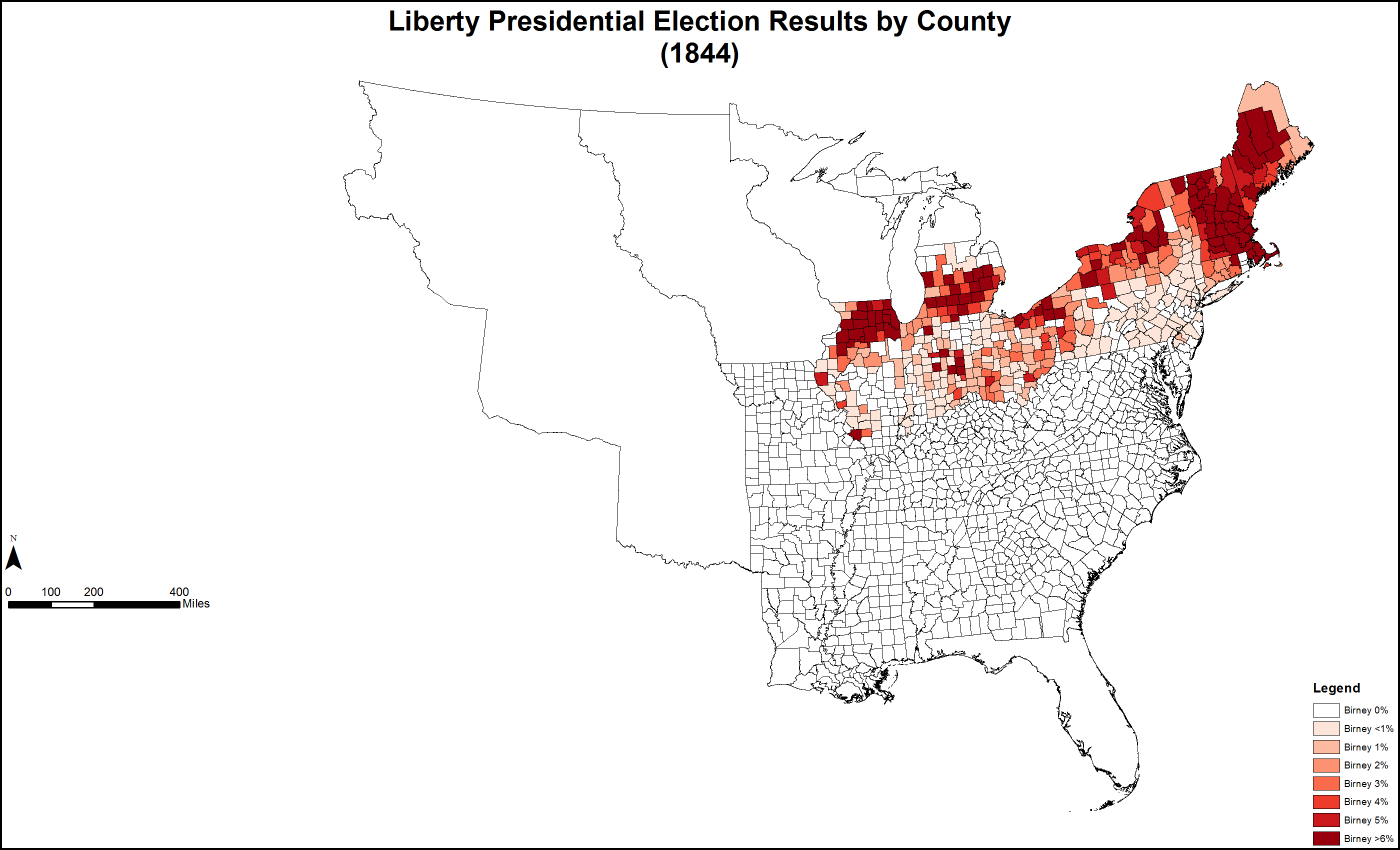
Results by county, shaded according to percentage of the vote for Birney

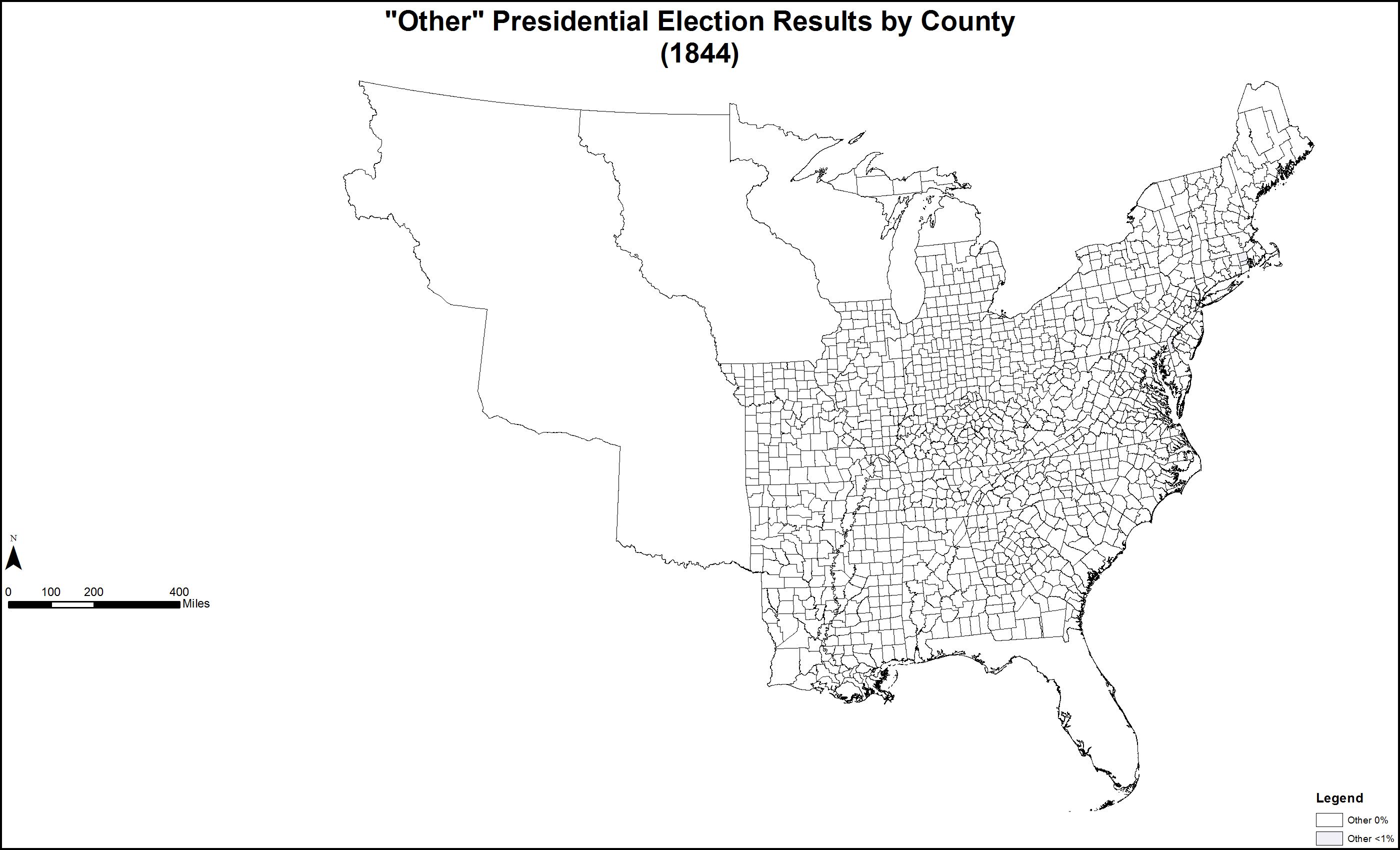
Results by county, shaded according to percentage of the vote for other candidates

== Results by state ==
Source: Data from Walter Dean Burnham, Presidential ballots, 1836-1892 (Johns Hopkins University Press, 1955) pp 247–57.

States/districts won by Polk/Dallas
States/districts won by Clay/Frelinghuysen

		James K. Polk Democratic			Henry Clay Whig			James G. Birney Liberty			Margin		State Total	
State	electoral votes	#	%	electoral votes	#	%	electoral votes	#	%	electoral votes	#	%	#	
Alabama	9	37,401	58.99	9	26,002	41.01	-	no ballots			11,399	17.98	63,403	AL
Arkansas	3	9,546	63.01	3	5,604	36.99	-	no ballots			3,942	26.02	15,150	AR
Connecticut	6	29,841	46.18	-	32,832	50.81	6	1,943	3.01	-	-2,991	-4.63	64,616	CT
Delaware	3	5,970	48.75	-	6,271	51.20	3	no ballots			-301	-2.45	12,247	DE
Georgia	10	44,147	51.19	10	42,100	48.81	-	no ballots			2,047	2.38	86,247	GA
Illinois	9	58,795	53.91	9	45,854	42.05	-	3,469	3.18	-	12,941	11.86	109,057	IL
Indiana	12	70,181	50.07	12	67,867	48.42	-	2,106	1.50	-	2,314	1.65	140,154	IN
Kentucky	12	51,988	45.91	-	61,249	54.09	12	no ballots			-9,261	-8.18	116,865	KY
Louisiana	6	13,782	51.30	6	13,083	48.70	-	no ballots			699	2.60	26,865	LA
Maine	9	45,719	53.83	9	34,378	40.48	-	4,836	5.69	-	11,341	13.35	84,933	ME
Maryland	8	32,706	47.61	-	35,984	52.39	8	no ballots			-3,278	-4.78	68,690	MD
Massachusetts	12	53,039	40.17	-	67,062	50.79	12	10,830	8.20	-	-14,023	-10.62	132,037	MA
Michigan	5	27,737	49.75	5	24,375	43.72	-	3,639	6.53	-	3,362	6.03	55,751	MI
Mississippi	6	25,846	57.43	6	19,158	42.57	-	no ballots			6,688	14.85	45,004	MS
Missouri	7	41,322	56.98	7	31,200	43.02	-	no ballots			10,122	13.96	72,522	MO
New Hampshire	6	27,160	55.22	6	17,866	36.32	-	4,161	8.46	-	9,294	18.90	49,187	NH
New Jersey	7	37,495	49.37	-	38,318	50.46	7	131	0.17	-	-823	-1.09	75,944	NJ
New York	36	237,588	48.90	36	232,482	47.85	-	15,812	3.25	-	5,106	1.05	485,882	NY
North Carolina	11	39,287	47.61	-	43,232	52.39	11	no ballots			-3,945	-4.78	82,521	NC
Ohio	23	149,061	47.74	-	155,113	49.68	23	8,050	2.58	-	-6,052	-1.94	312,224	OH
Pennsylvania	26	167,447	50.50	26	161,125	48.59	-	3,000	0.90	-	6,322	1.91	331,572	PA
Rhode Island	4	4,867	39.58	-	7,322	59.55	4	107	0.87	-	-2,455	-19.97	12,296	RI
South Carolina	9	no popular vote		9	no popular vote			no popular vote			-	-	-	SC
Tennessee	13	59,917	49.95	-	60,040	50.05	13	no ballots			-123	-0.10	119,957	TN
Vermont	6	18,049	36.96	-	26,780	54.84	6	3,970	8.13	-	-8,731	-17.88	48,829	VT
Virginia	17	50,679	53.05	17	44,860	46.95	-	no ballots			5,819	6.10	95,539	VA
TOTALS:	275	1,339,570	49.54	170	1,300,157	48.09	105	62,054	2.30	-	39,413	1.45	2,703,864	US
TO WIN:	138													

=== States that flipped from Whig to Democratic ===
- Georgia
- Indiana
- Louisiana
- Maine
- Michigan
- Mississippi
- New York
- Pennsylvania

=== Close states ===
States where the margin of victory was under 1%:

1. Tennessee 0.10% (123 votes)

States where the margin of victory was under 5%:

1. New York 1.05% (5,106 votes) (tipping point state)
2. New Jersey 1.09% (823 votes)
3. Indiana 1.65% (2,314 votes)
4. Pennsylvania 1.91% (6,322 votes)
5. Ohio 1.94% (6,052 votes)
6. Georgia 2.38% (2,047 votes)
7. Delaware 2.45% (301 votes)
8. Louisiana 2.6% (699 votes)
9. Connecticut 4.63% (2,991 votes)
10. North Carolina 4.78% (3,945 votes)
11. Maryland 4.78% (3,278 votes)

States where the margin of victory was under 10%:

1. Michigan 6.03% (3,362 votes)
2. Virginia 6.1% (5,819 votes)
3. Kentucky 8.18% (9,261 votes)

=== Electoral College selection ===
Method of choosing electors	State(s)
Each Elector appointed by state legislature	South Carolina
Each Elector chosen by voters statewide	(all other States)

== See also ==
- Bibliography of James K. Polk
- History of the United States (1789–1849)
- Inauguration of James K. Polk
- Kane Letter, written on June 19, 1844, by Polk to John K. Kane
- Second Party System
- 1844–45 United States House of Representatives elections
- 1844–45 United States Senate elections
