= William V. Brady =

American politician (1811–1870)

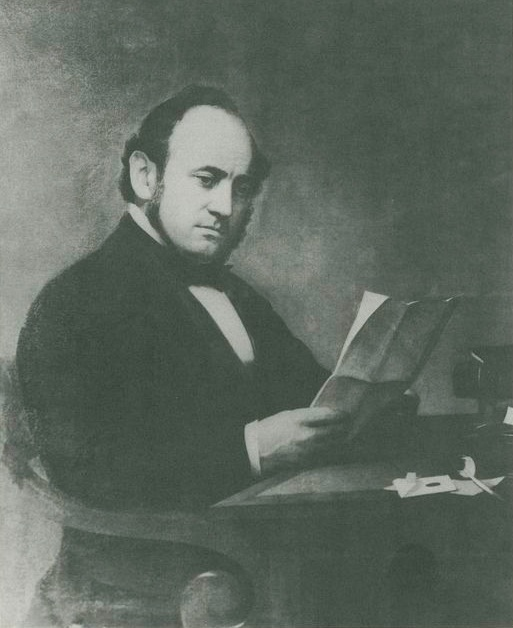

69th Mayor of New York City
- In office 1847–1848
- Preceded by: Andrew H. Mickle
- Succeeded by: William F. Havemeyer

Personal details
- Born: July 24, 1811 New York City, New York, U.S.
- Died: March 31, 1870 (aged 58) New York City, New York, U.S.
- Party: Whig

William Vermilye Brady (July 24, 1811– March 31, 1870) was the 69th mayor of New York City, in office from 1847 to 1848.

== Biography ==
William V. Brady was born in New York City on July 24, 1811. Before becoming active in politics, he was a silversmith and jeweler.

A fiscally conservative Whig, Brady entered politics as an opponent of the Tammany Hall Democratic organization. From 1842 to 1847 he served as Assistant Alderman and then Alderman.

In 1847 he was a successful candidate for Mayor, capitalizing on a rift in Tammany and the third party candidacy of an anti-immigration nominee to score a narrow victory. He served until 1848.

For his support of Zachary Taylor's winning campaign for President in 1848, Brady was rewarded in 1849 with appointment as Postmaster of New York City. He served in this post until 1853.

After Franklin Pierce became president in 1853, Brady was replaced as Postmaster and went into the insurance business as a founder of the Continental Insurance Company in 1853, serving until 1857 as its first president. He was also a member of the board of directors of the Mutual Life Insurance Company. He was also a founder of the Widows and Orphans Benefit Life Insurance Company, of which he was president.

Brady died in New York City on March 31, 1870. He was buried in Woodlawn Cemetery in The Bronx, New York City.

== Legacy ==
Brady Avenue in the Bronx was named after him.

Political offices
Preceded by Andrew H. Mickle	Mayor of New York City; 1847–1848	Succeeded by William Frederick Havemeyer
