= Caleb Smith Woodhull =

American politician (1792–1866)

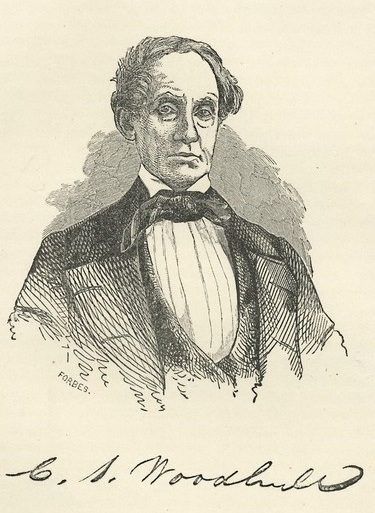

71st Mayor of New York City
- In office 1849–1851
- Preceded by: William F. Havemeyer
- Succeeded by: Ambrose Kingsland

Personal details
- Born: February 26, 1792 Miller Place, New York, US
- Died: July 16, 1866 (aged 74) Miller Place, New York, US
- Party: Whig
- Education: Yale University

Caleb Smith Woodhull (February 26, 1792 – July 16, 1866) was the 71st Mayor of New York City from 1849 to 1851.

== Biography ==
Coat of Arms of Caleb Smith Woodhull

Smith Woodhull was born in Miller Place, New York on February 26, 1792. He graduated from Yale University in 1811, studied law, and became an attorney in 1817.

Woodhull interrupted his studies to serve with the New York Militia in the War of 1812. He remained active in the militia until resigning his commission in 1830.

A Whig, Woodhull was elected in 1836 to New York City's Common Council, and he became a member of the Board of Aldermen in 1839. In 1843 he became President of the Board of Aldermen.

He was elected Mayor of New York in 1849 and served one term (the last one year term before mayoral terms were extended to two years, then, in 1905, to four years).

After leaving the mayor's office Woodhull retired to Miller Place, where he died on July 16, 1866.

Political offices
Preceded by William Frederick Havemeyer	Mayor of New York City; 1849–1851	Succeeded by Ambrose Kingsland
