= Kane Letter =

Letter written by James K. Polk

The Kane Letter was a widely circulated letter written on June 19, 1844 by James K. Polk to John K. Kane outlining his beliefs on tariffs, free trade, and protectionism during his 1844 campaign for President of the United States.

== Overview ==
Polk's letter contained a polished and succinct statement espousing support for moderate tariff relief. Many historians saw this letter as a "masterly straddle", but in recent years it has been viewed as Polk's only official position on the contentious and politically divisive tariff issue.

His opponent Henry Clay by contrast, produced hundreds of letters and public statements on the tariff, including seemingly contradictory views aimed at different audiences. Clay, a staunch supporter of protectionism, lost support when voters perceived his tariff position to be contradictory and favored Polk's consistent and indeed only position in the Kane letter. Pennsylvania Democrats put Polk's and Clay's views on protectionism side by side. Polk was hailed as a better protectionist due to Clay's mistake of excessive public statements.

Upon thinking about the letter at length and the strong stance it took, Polk sent another letter on July 2 to Kane requesting that Kane not publish it. By then it was printed widely and Polk was worried about the dangerous words the letter contained ("protection" and "discrimination", used several times within the document).

The Whigs used the letter as leverage against Polk, dredging up Polk's old statements strongly opposing tariffs. Polk was subsequently called upon by the Whigs to make a public statement regarding his position on the Tariff of 1842, which he meekly declined.

Two members of the United States Senate, George McDuffie and Robert Barnwell Rhett, were furious with the publication of the Kane Letter. McDuffie called for a secession of the South, and threatened raising the "Banner of Disunion". Franklin H. Elmore, Polk's Public Advisor, quickly took hold of the situation in Charleston, persuading McDuffie and his followers that Polk was "a southern man – a friend of free trade."

Polk was no different from many of the political candidates of that time, appealing to the side he was currently speaking to. James K. Polk was simply a better manipulator of men than Clay and so "defeated the ticket" in 1844.
