= Château de Vaulogé =

Château in Pays de la Loire, France

Coordinates: 47°53′32″N 0°02′58″W

- France
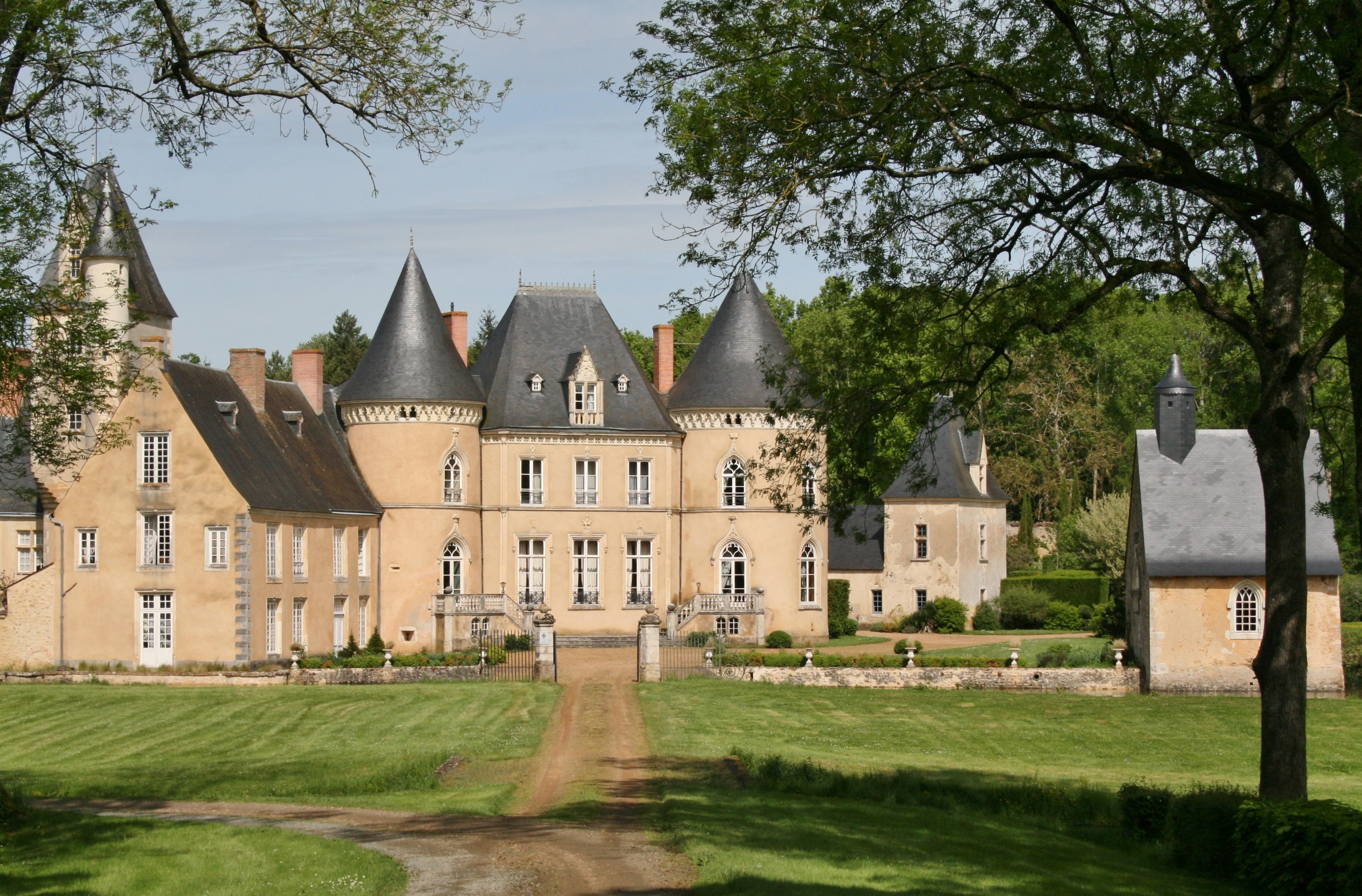

Site information
- Type: Castle

Site history
- Built: 14th century

The Château de Vaulogé is a château in Fercé-sur-Sarthe near Le Mans in the Sarthe department of France.

== History ==
It was built in the 15th century by Jean III de Vaulogé. In the late 18th century, René-Charles-Joseph de Vahais, a descendant of the original owner, renovated the castle into a country house.

== See also ==
- List of castles in France
