= List of newspapers in Iowa =

This is a list of newspapers in Iowa.

== Daily newspapers ==
=== City or metropolitan ===
- Ames Tribune – Ames
- Atlantic News-Telegraph – Atlantic
- Boone News-Republican – Boone
- Carroll Daily Times Herald – Carroll
- Charles City Press – Charles City
- Cherokee Chronicle Times – Cherokee
- Clinton Herald – Clinton
- Council Bluffs Daily Nonpareil – Council Bluffs
- Creston News Advertiser – Creston
- Des Moines Register – Des Moines
- Estherville Daily News – Estherville
- Fort Madison Daily Democrat – Fort Madison
- The Gazette – Cedar Rapids
- Globe Gazette – Mason City
- The Hawk Eye – Burlington
- Iowa City Press-Citizen – Iowa City
- Keokuk Daily Gate City – Keokuk
- Le Mars Daily Sentinel – Le Mars
- Marshalltown Times Republican – Marshalltown
- The Messenger – Fort Dodge
- Southeast Iowa Union – Mount Pleasant
- Muscatine Journal – Muscatine
- Newton Daily News – Newton
- Oelwein Daily Register – Oelwein
- The Oskaloosa Herald – Oskaloosa
- Ottumwa Courier – Ottumwa
- Quad-City Times – Davenport
- Sioux City Journal – Sioux City
- Spencer Daily Reporter – Spencer
- Telegraph Herald – Dubuque
- Vinton Cedar Valley Daily Times – Vinton
- The Waterloo-Cedar Falls Courier – Waterloo
- Webster City Daily Freeman-Journal – Webster City

=== Newspapers published by universities ===
- The Daily Iowan – Iowa City
- The Grand Views – Des Moines
- Iowa State Daily – Ames
- The Northern Iowan – Cedar Falls
- The Scarlet & Black – Grinnell

== Agribusiness and business newspapers ==
- Corridor Business Journal – North Liberty
- Des Moines Business Record – Des Moines
- Iowa Farm Bureau Spokesman – Iowa Falls
- Iowa Farmer Today – Cedar Rapids
- Quad-City Business Journal – Davenport

== Weekly and bi-weekly community newspapers ==
=== Adair County ===
- Adair County Free Press – Greenfield
- Adair News – Adair
- Fontanelle Observer – Greenfield

=== Adams County ===
- Adams County Free Press – Corning

=== Allamakee County ===
- Allamakee Journal – Lansing
- Postville Herald – Postville
- Waukon Standard – Waukon

=== Appanoose County ===
- Moravia Union – Moravia
- Moulton Tribune – Moulton

=== Audubon County ===
- Audubon County Advocate Journal – Audubon

=== Benton County ===
- Star Press-Union – Belle Plaine
- Vinton Eagle / Cedar Valley Times – Vinton

=== Black Hawk County ===
- Hudson Herald – Hudson
- The Progress-Review – La Porte City

=== Boone County ===
- Madrid Register-News – Madrid
- Ogden Reporter – Ogden

=== Bremer County ===
- Sumner Gazette – Sumner
- Tripoli Leader – Tripoli
- Waverly Democrat – Waverly

=== Buchanan County ===
- Independence Bulletin-Journal – Independence
- Jesup Citizen Herald – Jesup
- Lamont Leader – Lamont
- The Winthrop News – Winthrop

=== Buena Vista County ===
- Buena Vista County Journal – Newell, Iowa
- Storm Lake Times – Storm Lake

=== Butler County ===
- Butler County Tribune-Journal – Allison
- Clarksville Star – Clarksville

=== Calhoun County ===
- Calhoun County Journal – Manson
- Lake City Graphic-Advocate – Lake City

=== Carroll County ===
- Breda News – Breda
- Coon Rapids Enterprise – Coon Rapids
- Glidden Graphic – Glidden
- Manning Monitor – Manning

=== Cass County ===
- Anita Tribune – Anita
- Griswold American – Griswold

=== Cedar County ===
- Lowden Sun-News and Advertiser – Lowden
- Tipton Conservative – Tipton
- West Branch Times – West Branch

=== Cerro Gordo County ===
- Mirror Reporter – Clear Lake
- Pioneer Enterprise – Rockwell

=== Cherokee County ===
- Aurelia Star – Aurelia
- Cherokee Chronicle Times – Cherokee
- The Marcus News - Marcus, Iowa https://themarcusnews.com

=== Chickasaw County ===
- Fredericksburg News – Fredericksburg
- Nashua Reporter – Nashua
- New Hampton Economist-Tribune – New Hampton

=== Clarke County ===
- Sentinel Tribune – Osceola

=== Clay County ===
- Everly-Royal News – Everly
- Peterson Patriot – Peterson
- Sioux Rapids Bulletin-Press – Sioux Rapids

=== Clayton County ===
- Clayton County Register – Elkader
- Guttenberg Press – Guttenberg
- Monona Outlook – Monona
- North Iowa Times – McGregor
- Strawberry Point Press-Journal – Strawberry Point

=== Clinton County ===
- The Observer – De Witt

=== Crawford County ===
- Charter Oak-Ute Newspaper – Charter Oak
- Denison Bulletin-Review – Denison
- Denison Free Press – Denison
- Manilla Times – Manilla
- Schleswig Leader – Schleswig
- Westside Observer – Westside

=== Dallas County ===
- Dallas County News – Adel
- Northeast Dallas County Record – Woodward
- Perry Chief – Perry

=== Davis County ===
- Bloomfield Democrat – Bloomfield

=== Decatur County ===
- Lamoni Chronicle – Lamoni
- Leon Journal-Reporter – Leon

=== Delaware County ===
- Delaware County Leader – Hopkinton
- Edgewood Reminder – Edgewood
- Manchester Press – Manchester

=== Des Moines County ===
- Burlington Beacon - Burlington
- Des Moines County News – West Burlington
- Mediapolis News – Mediapolis
- The Hawk Eye Newspaper - Burlington

=== Dickinson County ===
- Dickinson County News – Spirit Lake

=== Dubuque County ===
- Cascade Pioneer – Cascade
- Dyersville Commercial – Dyersville

=== Emmet County ===
- Armstrong Journal – Armstrong
- Ringsted Dispatch – Armstrong

=== Fayette County ===
- Elgin Echo – Elgin
- Fayette County Union – West Union
- Fayette Leader – Fayette
- Hawkeye Booster – Hawkeye

=== Floyd County ===
- Rockford Register – Nora Springs

=== Franklin County ===
- Conservative Chronicle – Hampton
- Hampton Chronicle – Hampton
- Sheffield Press - Sheffield

=== Fremont County ===
- Argus-Herald – Sidney
- Beacon-Enterprise – Tabor
- Hamburg Reporter – Hamburg

=== Greene County ===
- Jefferson Herald – Jefferson
- Scranton Journal – Scranton

=== Grundy County ===
- The Grundy Register – Grundy Center
- The Record – Conrad
- Reinbeck Courier – Reinbeck

=== Guthrie County ===
- Bayard News Gazette – Bayard
- Guthrie Center Times-Vedette – Guthrie Center
- Stuart Herald – Stuart

=== Hamilton County ===
- South Hamilton Record-News – Jewell
- Stratford Courier – Stratford

=== Hancock County ===
- Britt News-Tribune – Forest City
- The Leader – Garner

=== Hardin County ===
- Ackley World Journal – Ackley
- Eldora Herald-Ledger – Eldora
- Hardin County Index – Eldora
- Iowa Falls Times Citizen – Iowa Falls
- South Hardin Signal-Review – Hubbard

=== Harrison County ===
- Dunlap Reporter – Dunlap
- Missouri Valley Times-News – Missouri Valley
- Twiner-Herald – Woodbine and Logan

=== Henry County ===
- New London Journal – New London
- Winfield Beacon/Wayland News – Winfield

=== Howard County ===
- Cresco Times-Plain Dealer – Cresco
- Lime Springs Herald – Lime Springs
- Riceville Recorder – Riceville

=== Humboldt County ===
- Humboldt Independent – Humboldt

=== Ida County ===
- Ida County Courier – Ida Grove

=== Iowa County ===
- Hometown Current – Marengo (consolidation and rebranding of the former North English English Valleys Star and Victor Warrior Tribune newspapers in June 2019)
- Marengo Pioneer-Republican – Marengo
- Williamsburg Journal Tribune – Williamsburg

=== Jackson County ===
- Bellevue Herald-Leader – Bellevue
- Maquoketa Sentinel-Press Maquoketa
- Preston Times – Preston

=== Jasper County ===
- Colfax Jasper Co. Tribune – Colfax
- Monroe Legacy – Monroe
- Prairie City News – Prairie City
- Sully Hometown Press – Sully

=== Jefferson County ===
- Packwood Clarion-Plainsman – Richland

=== Johnson County ===
- Lone Tree Reporter – Lone Tree
- North Liberty Leader – North Liberty
- Solon Economist – Solon

=== Jones County ===
- Anamosa Journal-Eureka – Anamosa
- Midland Times – Wyoming
- Monticello Express – Monticello

=== Keokuk County ===
- Keota Eagle – Keota
- Sigourney News-Review – Sigourney
- What Cheer Patriot Chronicle – What Cheer

=== Kossuth County ===
- Bancroft Register – Bancroft
- Swea City Herald-Press – Swea City
- Titonka Topic – Titonka
- Upper Des Moines – Algona
- Whittemore Independent – Whittemore

=== Lee County ===
- West Point Bee-Star – West Point

=== Linn County ===
- Linn News-Letter – Central City
- Marion Times – Marion
- Mount Vernon-Lisbon Sun – Mount Vernon

=== Louisa County ===
- Columbus Junction Gazette – Columbus Junction
- Morning Sun News-Herald – Morning Sun
- Wapello Republican – Wapello

=== Lucas County ===
- Chariton Herald-Patriot – Chariton
- Chariton Leader – Chariton

=== Lyon County ===
- Doon Press – Doon
- The Free Lance – Little Rock
- Lyon County News – George
- Lyon County Reporter – Rock Rapids
- West Lyon Herald – Inwood

=== Madison County ===
- Earlham Advocate – Earlham
- Winterset Madisonian – Winterset
- Earlham Echo – Earlham

=== Mahaska County ===
- Fremont Village Vine – Fremont
- Oskaloosa Herald – Oskaloosa

=== Marion County ===
- Knoxville Journal-Express – Knoxville
- Marion County News – Pleasantville

=== Marshall County ===
- Mid Iowa Enterprise – – State Center

=== Mills County ===
- Glenwood Opinion Tribune – Glenwood
- Malvern Leader – Malvern

=== Mitchell County ===
- Mitchell County Press-News – Osage
- Saint Ansgar Enterprise Journal – Saint Ansgar
- Stacyville Monitor Review – Stacyville

=== Monona County ===
- Mapleton Press – Mapleton
- Onawa Democrat – Onawa
- Onana Sentinel – Onawa

=== Monroe County ===
- Albia Union-Republican – Albia
- Monroe County News – Albia

=== Montgomery County ===
- Red Oak Express – Red Oak
- Villisca Review and Stanton Viking – Villisca

=== Muscatine County ===
- Discover Muscatine – Muscatine
- West Liberty Index – West Liberty
- Wilton-Durant Advocate News – Wilton

=== O'Brien County ===
- Hartley Sentinel-News – Hartley
- The N'West Iowa Review / Sheldon Mail-Sun – Sheldon
- The O'Brien County Bell – Primghar
- The Paullina Times – Paullina
- Sanborn Pioneer – Sanborn

=== Osceola County ===
- Melvin News – Melvin
- Ocheyedan Press – Ocheyedan
- Sibley Gazette-Tribune – Sibley

=== Page County ===
- Southwest Iowa Herald – Shenandoah (consolidation of former Clarinda Herald-Journal and Shenandoah Valley News)
- Essex Independent – Essex

=== Palo Alto County ===
- Emmetsburg Democrat / Emmetsburg Reporter – Emmetsburg
- Graettinger Times – Graettinger
- Ruthven Zipcode – Ruthven
- West Bend Journal – West Bend

=== Plymouth County ===
- Akron Hometowner – Akron
- Hinton Times – Hinton
- Kingsley News-Times – Kingsley
- Remsen Bell-Enterprise – Remsen

=== Pocahontas County ===
- Laurens Sun – Laurens
- Pocahontas Record Democrat – Pocahontas

=== Polk County ===
- Altoona Herald-Mitchellville Index – Altoona
- Cityview – Johnston

=== Pottawattamie County ===
- Avoca Journal-Herald – Avoca
- Oakland Herald – Oakland

=== Poweshiek County ===
- Grinnell Herald-Register – Grinnell
- Poweshiek County Chronicle-Republican – Grinnell
- Montezuma Record - Montezuma

=== Ringgold County ===
- Diagonal Progress – Diagonal
- Mount Ayr Record-News – Mount Ayr

=== Sac County ===
- Odebolt Chronicle – Odebolt
- The Resort – Lake View
- The Sun – Sac City

=== Scott County ===
- Bettendorf News – Bettendorf
- The Catholic Messenger – Davenport
- The North Scott Press – Eldridge

=== Shelby County ===
- Harlan Tribune & News Advertiser – Harlan

=== Sioux County ===
- Hawarden Independent – Hawarden
- Ireton Examiner – Ireton
- Rock Valley Bee – Rock Valley
- Sioux Center News – Sioux Center
- Sioux County Capital Democrat – Orange City
- Sioux County Index Reporter – Hull
- Siouxland Press – Hospers

=== Story County ===
- Nevada Journal – Nevada
- Story City Herald – Story City
- Tri-County Times (Iowa) – Slater

=== Tama County ===
- North Tama Telegraph – Traer
- Northern-Sun Print – Gladbrook
- Tama-Toledo News Chronicle – Tama

=== Taylor County ===
- Bedford Times-Press – Bedford
- Lenox Time Table – Lenox

=== Union County ===
- Creston News Advertiser – Creston
- Star Enterprise – Afton

=== Van Buren County ===
- Van Buren County Leader-Record Farmington
- Van Buren County Register Keosauqua

=== Warren County ===
- Carlisle Citizen – Carlisle
- Indianola Independent Advocate – Indianola
- Indianola Record-Herald & Tribune – Indianola
- North Warren Town & County News – Norwalk

=== Washington County ===
- Kalona News – Kalona
- Riverside Current – Riverside
- Washington Evening Journal – Washington
- Wellman Advance – Wellman

=== Wayne County ===
- Corydon Times-Republican – Corydon
- Seymour Herald – Seymour

=== Webster County ===
- Dayton Leader – Dayton
- Gowrie News – Gowrie

=== Winnebago County ===
- Buffalo Center Tribune – Buffalo Center
- Thompson Courier and Rake Register – Thompson

=== Winneshiek County ===
- Calmar Courier – Calmar
- Decorah Journal-Public Opinion – Decorah
- Ossian Bee – Ossian

=== Woodbury County ===
- Danbury Review – Danbury
- Moville Record – Moville
- Sergeant Bluff Advocate – Sergeant Bluff
- Sioux Valley News – Anthon

=== Worth County ===
- Northwood Anchor Northwood

=== Wright County ===
- Belmond Independent – Belmond
- Eagle Grove Eagle – Eagle Grove
- Wright County Monitor – Clarion

== Defunct newspapers ==
- Burlington Evening Gazette (Burlington, 1904–1911)
- Cedar Rapids Republican (Cedar Rapids, 1898–1921)
- Cerro Gordo County Republican (Mason City) (1893–1906)
- Cresco Plain Dealer (Cresco) (1913–1945)
- Daily Iowegian – Centerville
- Decorah Posten (Decorah, in Norwegian)
- Delaware County News (Manchester) (1896–1912)
- Der Demokrat (Davenport) (186?–1868)
- Denison Herald
- Des Moines Tribune (1906–1982)
- Dysart Reporter – Dysart
- Evening Times-Republican (Marshalltown) (1890–1923)
- Express-Republican (Mason City) (1886–1893)
- Iowa Bystander (Des Moines) (1894–1916)
- The Iowa Jewish News
- Manchester Democrat (1875–1930)
- Manchester Democrat-Radio (1930–1988)
- Mason City Express (1870–1886)
- The Morning Democrat (Davenport) (1855–1897)
- Ottumwa Tri-Weekly Courier (1903–1916)
- Political Beacon (Lawrenceburg) (1837–1845)
- Sioux City Tribune
- Traer Star-Clipper – Traer
- Der tägliche Demokrat (Davenport) (186?–1918)

== See also ==
Comprehensive

- Lists of newspapers
- List of newspapers in the United States

Frequency

- List of free daily newspapers in the United States
- List of weekly newspapers in the United States

Circulation

- List of international newspapers originating in the United States
- List of national newspapers in the United States
- List of newspapers in the United States by circulation
- List of newspapers serving cities over 100,000 in the United States

Foreign language

- List of French-language newspapers published in the United States
- List of German-language newspapers published in the United States
- List of Spanish-language newspapers published in the United States

Specialty

- List of African-American newspapers in the United States
- List of alternative weekly newspapers in the United States
- List of business newspapers in the United States
- List of family-owned newspapers in the United States
- List of Jewish newspapers in the United States
- List of LGBTQ periodicals in the United States
- List of student newspapers in the United States
- List of supermarket tabloids in the United States
- List of underground press in the United States

Other

- List of defunct newspapers of the United States
