= 1894 New York City mayoral election =

- November 6, 1894
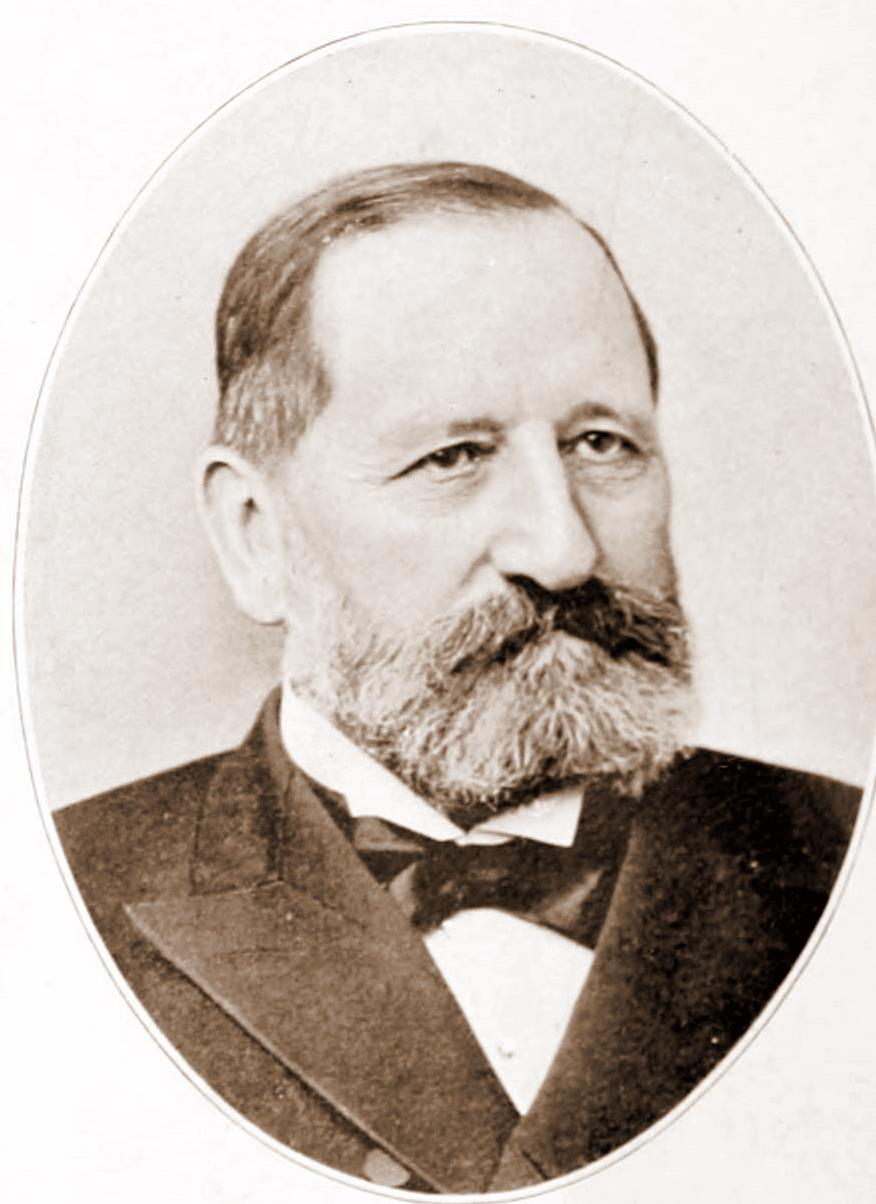

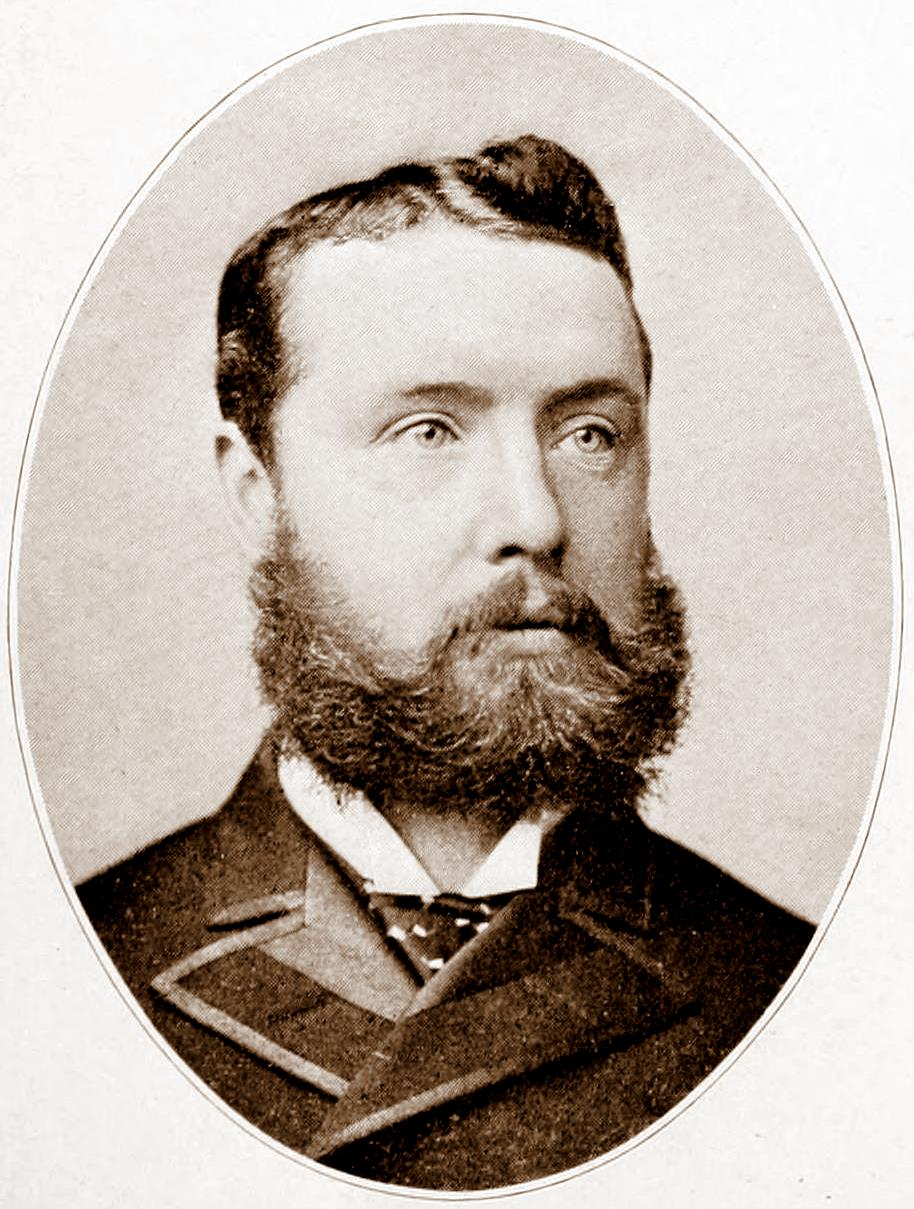
Nominee	William L. Strong	Hugh J. Grant
Party	Republican	Democratic
Popular vote	154,094	108,907
Percentage	56.6%	40.0%
Mayor before election
Thomas F. Gilroy
Democratic
Elected mayor
William L. Strong
Republican

An election for Mayor of New York City was held on November 6, 1894.

Incumbent mayor Thomas Francis Gilroy, whose administration had been severely weakened by the Lexow Committee investigations, was not a candidate for a second term. William Lafayette Strong, a reformist banker, easily defeated former mayor Hugh J. Grant to succeed Gilroy.

This was the final mayoral election held prior to the consolidation of Greater New York (including Brooklyn, Queens, and Staten Island) by a public referendum in December 1894. As a result of that referendum, Strong's term as mayor was extended by one year, making this the only election to a three-year term in office.

== Background ==
Beginning with the election of Hugh J. Grant in 1888, Tammany Hall and boss Richard Croker had dominated New York City politics. Despite 1890 hearings in the New York Senate which uncovered evidence of bribery and corruption, Tammany won large majorities in the 1890 and 1892 elections.

In 1894, a more aggressive Senate investigation chaired by Clarence Lexow publicized New York Police Department corruption, bribery, and complicity in prostitution rings under police chief Bill Devery. During the hearings, Croker fled the country to Europe and Devery feigned an illness to avoid criminal prosecution. The Lexow Committee ultimately published over 10,000 pages of testimony, uncovering an institutional system of "extortion, bribery, counterfeiting, voter intimidation, election fraud, brutality, and scams" with direct involvement and leadership by high-ranking Tammany Hall members. In response, Mayor Gilroy appointed a bipartisan board of police directors, but his popularity had sunk, and he did not stand for election to a second term.

In addition to the Tammany and police corruption scandals, the national fiscal depression dampened support for the incumbent Democratic Party in cities across the country.

== General election ==
=== Candidates ===
- George Gethin (Prohibition)
- Hugh J. Grant, former mayor of New York City (Democratic)
- James McCallum (People's)
- Lucien Sanial, newspaper editor, economist, and activist (Socialist Labor)
- William Lafayette Strong, banker (Republican, Empire State Democracy, New York State Democracy, Democratic Reform, and Good Government)

==== Withdrew ====
- Nathan Straus, owner of Macy's and Abraham & Straus department stores (Democratic)

=== Campaign ===
The Democratic nomination initially went to department store magnate Nathan Straus, but he withdrew after two weeks, fearing reprisals against his businesses.

=== Results ===
Strong received support throughout the city, particularly from German and Jewish immigrants.

1894 New York City mayoral election
Party	Candidate	Votes	%
Republican	William Lafayette Strong	154,094	56.63%
Democratic	Hugh J. Grant	108,907	40.02%
Socialist Labor	Lucien Sanial	7,225	2.67%
Prohibition	George Gethin	780	0.29%
Populist	James McCallum	1,093	0.40%
Republican gain from Democratic			
