= James J. Coogan =

American borough president, merchant, and real estate manager

James Jay Coogan
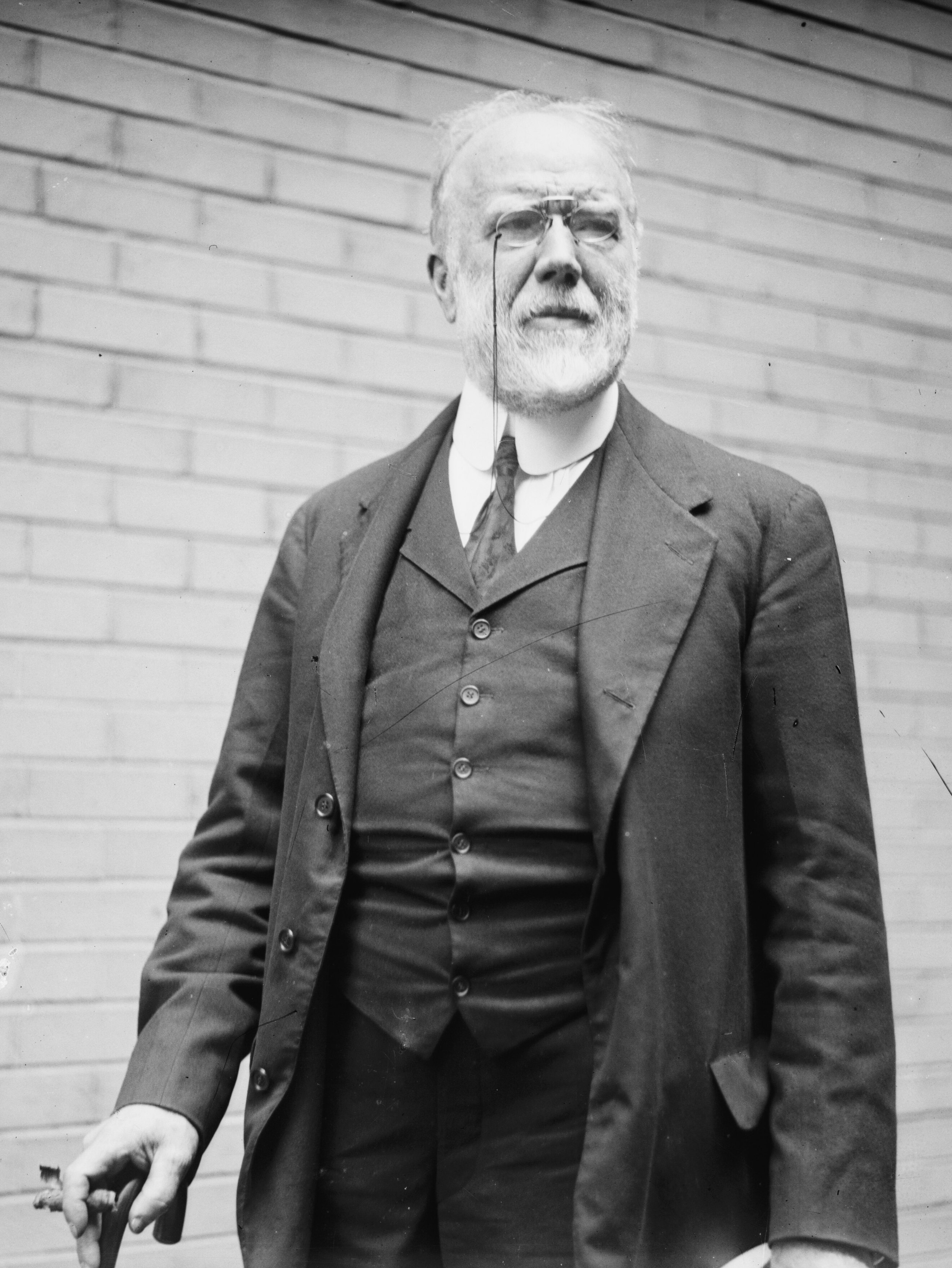

2nd Borough President of Manhattan
- In office January 5, 1899 – December 31, 1901
- Preceded by: Augustus Winniett Peters
- Succeeded by: Jacob Aaron Cantor

Personal details
- Born: January 16, 1846 Manhattan, New York, U.S.
- Died: October 24, 1915 (aged 69) Manhattan, New York, U.S.
- Party: Democratic
- Other political affiliations: United Labor
- Education: New York University School of Law

James Jay Coogan (January 16, 1846 – October 24, 1915) was the borough president of Manhattan, New York from 1899 to 1901, and a successful merchant and real estate manager.

== Biography ==
Coogan was born on January 16, 1846, in Manhattan, New York City. He was a graduate of New York University School of Law. He started out as an upholsterer, and opened a furniture store on the Bowery. Through his dealings with furniture laborers, he became known as a friend of the working class, and eventually became friendly with Richard Croker, one of the leaders of Tammany Hall.

In 1888, he was nominated by the United Labor Party for mayor of New York City, but came in fourth, and Hugh J. Grant was elected mayor. He married Harriet Gertrude Lynch, a daughter of William L. Lynch, who had many real estate holdings in Manhattan, including the land on which the Polo Grounds stood. He managed the properties, and is the source of the Coogan's Bluff and Coogan's Hollow names.

He died of heart disease on October 24, 1915, at the Hotel Netherland in Manhattan, New York. He was buried in Calvary Cemetery in Queens, New York City.

Political offices
Preceded by Augustus W. Peters	Borough President of Manhattan; 1899-1901	Succeeded by Jacob A. Cantor
