= 1888 New York City mayoral election =

- November 6, 1888
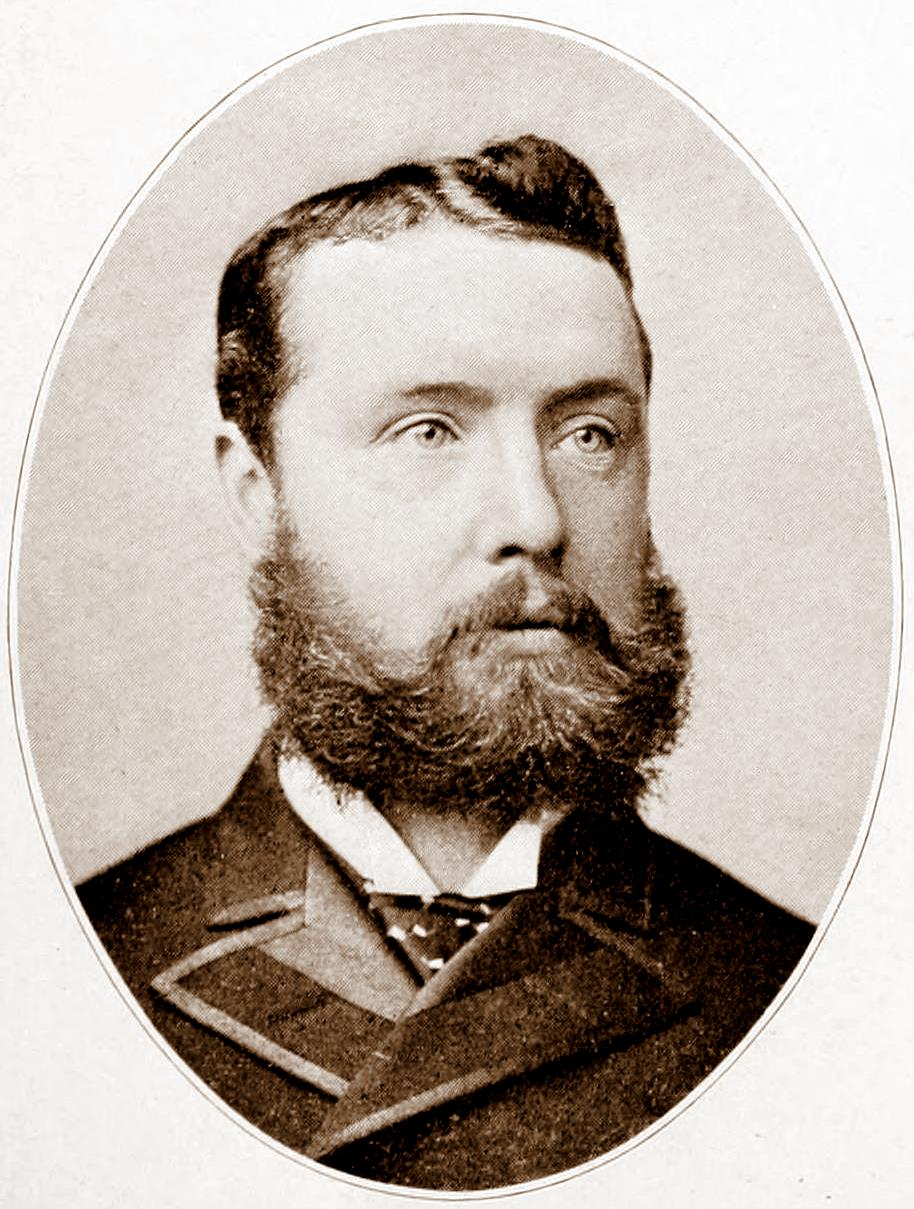

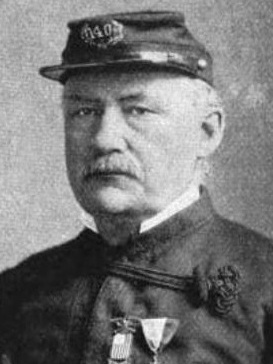

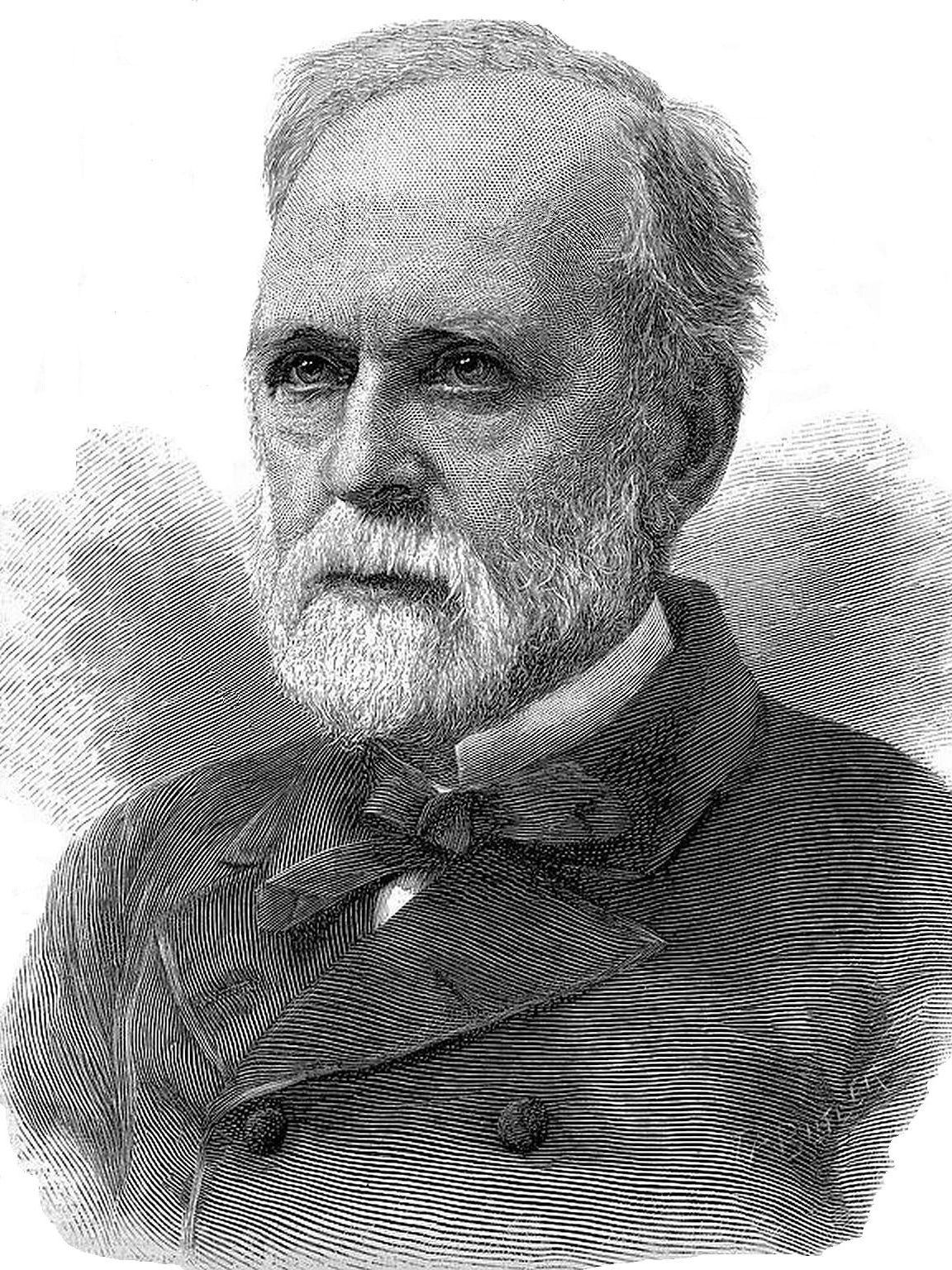
Nominee	Hugh J. Grant	Joel Erhardt	Abram Hewitt
Party	Democratic	Republican	Independent Democratic
Popular vote	114,111	73,037	71,979
Percentage	41.9%	26.8%	26.4%
- Ward results Grant: 30–40% 40–50% 50–60% Erhardt: 30–40% Hewitt: 30–40% 40–50%
Mayor before election
Abram Hewitt
Democratic
Elected mayor
Hugh J. Grant
Democratic

An election for Mayor of New York City was held on November 6, 1888.

Incumbent mayor Abram Hewitt, who had fallen out of favor with the Tammany Hall machine, ran on the reformist "New York County Democracy" ticket, but was defeated by Tammany favorite Hugh J. Grant. Hewitt finished third, narrowly behind Republican candidate Joel Erhardt. Grant, who was only thirty at the time, remains the youngest elected mayor in the history of the city as of 2026, and was only the second Roman Catholic mayor.

During the campaign, Cynthia Leonard became the first woman to run for mayor, though she received only four write-in votes for a symbolic campaign. She was permitted to register as a voter but not to cast a ballot.

== General election ==
=== Candidates ===
- James J. Coogan, upholsterer and real estate investor (United Labor)
- Joel Erhardt, president of the New York City and Northern Railroad, former commissioner of the New York Police Department and former U.S. Marshal (Republican)
- Hugh J. Grant, Sheriff of New York County (Democratic)
- Abram Hewitt, incumbent mayor since 1885 and former U.S. Representative and chair of the Democratic National Committee (County Democracy)
- Alexander Jonas (Socialist)
- Cynthia Leonard, suffragist and social reformer (Equal Rights) (write-in)
- William T. Wardwell (Prohibition)

=== Results ===
1888 New York City mayoral election
Party	Candidate	Votes	%
Democratic	Hugh J. Grant	114,111	41.89%
Republican	Joel Erhardt	73,037	26.81%
Independent Democratic	Abram Hewitt (incumbent)	71,979	26.42%
United Labor	James J. Coogan	9,809	3.60%
Socialist	Alesxander Jonas	2,645	0.97%
Prohibition	William T. Wardwell	832	0.31%
Equal Rights	Cynthia Leonard (write-in)	4	0.00%
Democratic hold			
