= Julia Rice Seney =

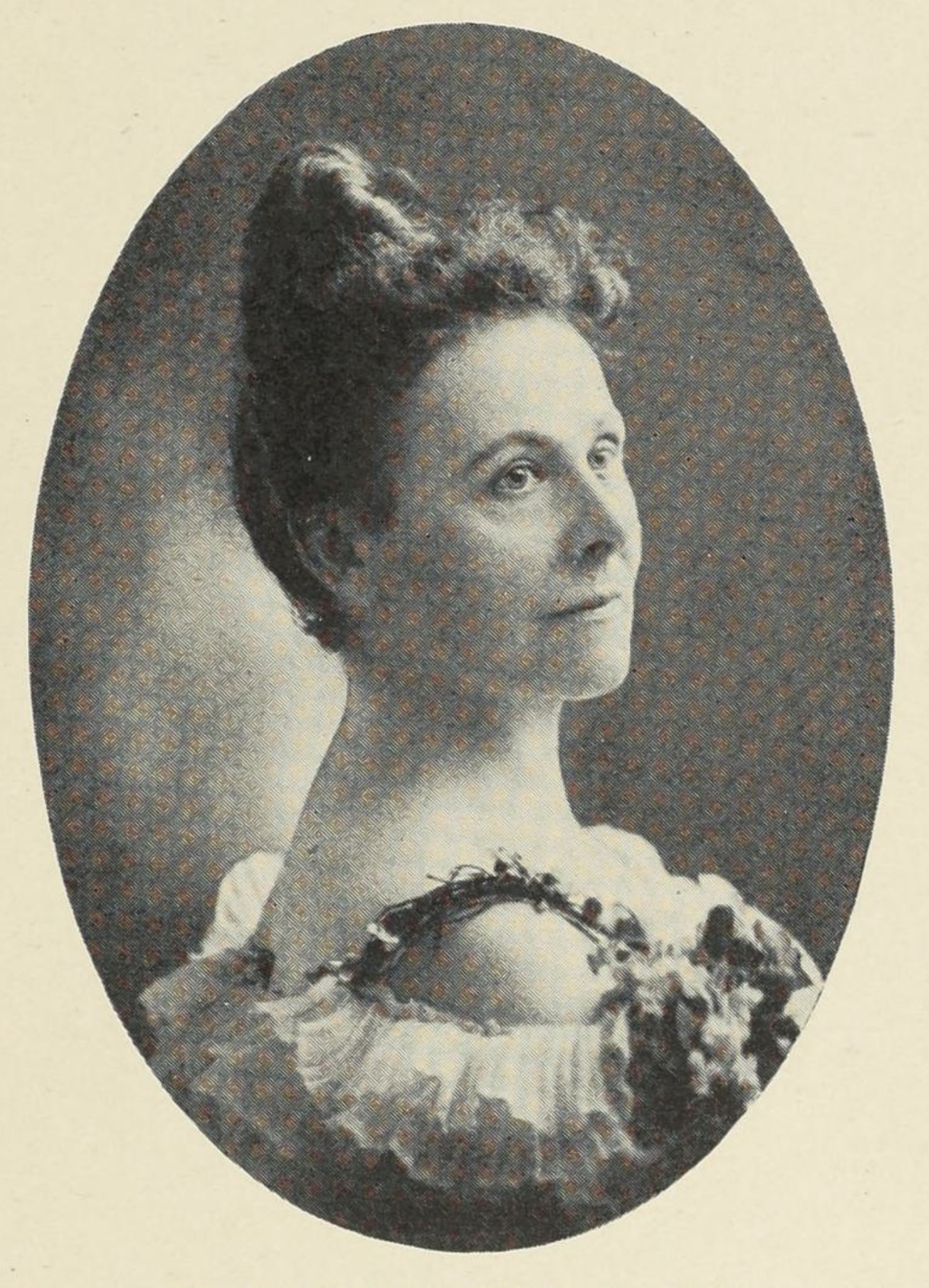
- Seney in a 1924 publication
- Born: Julia Rice; August 15, 1853; Kalida, Ohio, U.S.
- Died: April 30, 1915 (aged 61); Toledo, Ohio, U.S.
- Education: Vermillion Institute
- Occupations: writer; newspaper editor; government administrator; charity worker
- Known for: In her day, she was the only woman holding the position of Superintendent of the Registry Department in a post office of the first class.
- Spouse: Judge Joshua Robert Seney
- Relatives: Americus V. Rice (brother); Edmund Rice; Clara Barton; Mary Livermore; Harriet Hosmer; Alexander H. Rice

Julia Rice Seney (née, Rice; 1853-1915) was an American writer, newspaper editor, government administrator, and charity worker from Ohio. In her day, she was the only woman holding the position of Superintendent of the Registry Department in a post office of the first class. She was active in the woman's suffrage movement. Seney was greatly interested in the University of Toledo and along with Kate Brownlee Sherwood, was regarded as one of its founders.

== Early life and education ==
Julia Rice was born in Kalida, Ohio, on August 15, 1853. She was the youngest child of Clark H. Rice, first president of an Ottawa, Ohio banking firm, and Catherine Mowers, both of Vermont. Seney's brother was Gen. Americus V. Rice.

Seney's grandfather was an army officer in the War of 1812. Her great-grandfather was a Revolutionary War soldier, ranking as captain. The Rices were direct descendants of Edmund Rice, one of the Puritans who settled near Boston, and had such descendants as Clara Barton, Mary Livermore, Harriet Hosmer, and Massachusetts Governor Alexander H. Rice.

Seney received her education in the public schools at Kalida, and completed a four years' collegiate course at the Vermillion Institute (Hayesville, Ohio).

== Career ==
Shortly after her graduation from a four years' course at Vermillion Institute, she married Joshua Robert Seney (died 1901).

In 1881, Judge Seney was stricken with the grippe, from the effects of which he never recovered. It thus became financially necessary for Mrs. Seney to become employed. She opened a real estate office, and began contributing to magazines and newspapers.

She was state inspector and later assistant instituting and installing officer in the Woman's Relief Corps. She was a charter member of Forsyth Corps, 1. She was for two years Assistant Department Inspector. In the latter capacity, she instituted more corps than any other officer of that era.

During the World's Fair at Chicago, Mayor Vincent J. Emmick appointed Mrs. Seney with Dennison Smith to represent the City of Toledo, Ohio. Shortly afterwards, she was appointed by Governor James E. Campbell to the important position of "hostess for Ohio". At this great fair, Seney performed the duties of hostess of the Ohio Building.

At the close of the World's Fair, Seney was made associate editor of the Sunday Courier-Journal (1893-94), later renamed the Sunday Times of Toledo.

This position she resigned in order to accept the superintendency of the registry department of the Toledo post office in October 1894. This appointment was the result of the direct influence of President Grover Cleveland. Seney had the honor of being the only woman to hold such a position in a first class postoffice. The reports of the inspectors during her tenure of office abounded with praise for her able conduct of its affairs. Seney held the position for five years. The department at Washington valued her services so highly that for three months they refused to accept her resignation, and did not accept it until she wrote on to Washington that it would be impossible for her to keep the office.

After resigning her post office position, she devoted her time to business and literary interests. At that time, she wrote many special articles for various publications. The Toledo City Council, without any solicitation on Seney's part, unanimously elected her a member of the Manual Training School Board (now University of Toledo), but owing to a defect in the law, the election was declared unconstitutional. Congressman John Patterson suggested Seney's name for lady commissioner at the Jamestown Exposition, but she declined the honor.

Seney was a member of the advisory board of the Lucas County Children's Home at Maumee, Ohio from its establishment, and in March 1915, she was elected president of the board. She was also a member of the Press Club of Toledo, the Toledo Shakespeare Association, the Toledo Writer's Club, the Woman's Relief Corps, the Daughters of the American Revolution, The Ohio Newspaper Woman Woman's Association, and was a member of the First Congregational Church.

She was a student of and devotee to Shakespeare, and for three years, teacher of a large Shakespeare class. Seney was a great believer in outdoor sports, and with Charles J. Strobel, established the first baseball league Toledo ever had. She was greatly interested in the University of Toledo and along with Kate Brownlee Sherwood, was regarded as one of its founders. Seney was also an important factor in bringing the University Extension to Toledo.

== Death ==
Julia Rice Seney died April 30, 1915, at Toledo.

== Genealogy ==
Seney was a direct descendant of Edmund Rice, an English immigrant to the Massachusetts Bay Colony, as follows:

- Julia Rice Seney, daughter of
  - Clark Hammond Rice (1804–1870), son of

  - Ebenezer Rice (1773–1821), son of
  - Samuel Rice (1752–1828), son of
  - Gershom Rice (1703 – ?), son of

      - Ephraim Rice (1665–1732), son of
      - Thomas Rice (1626–1681), son of

      - Edmund Rice (1594–1663)

== Selected works ==
- Dandelions, 1911 (with Ann Thrift)
