= Journal-Express =

American newspaper in Iowa (1855–2020)

- Type: Weekly newspaper
- Owner(s): CNHI
- Founded: 1855 (170 years ago)
- Language: American English
- Ceased publication: 2020 (5 years ago)
- Headquarters: Knoxville, Iowa
- Circulation: 2,034 (as of 2018)
- OCLC number: 17927743

The Journal-Express was a weekly newspaper in Knoxville, Iowa. Its publication was discontinued in May 2020, when it was merged with The Oskaloosa Herald, making it one of 16 publications shut down by owner CNHI due to business losses associated with the economic impact of the COVID-19 pandemic in the United States.

It was published on Friday, and had a circulation of 2,034 two years before it was discontinued.

The original Knoxville Journal was founded in 1855 by William Milo Stone, later a Civil War hero and Iowa governor. In those years, the paper expressed the growing sentiments of a newly minted Republican party. The name Express was added after mergers built out of the old Marion County Democrat paper, founded in 1865, which itself had evolved into the Marion County Express in 1879.

== Previous names ==
The following newspaper names preceded the now defunct Journal-Express:

- The Knoxville Express (Knoxville, Iowa) 1884–1986
- Knoxville Journal (Knoxville, Iowa) 1874–1986
  - The Bussey Record (Bussey, Iowa) 1950–1951
  - Iowa Voter (Knoxville, Iowa) 1867–1874
- Marion County Express (Knoxville, Iowa) 1879–1884
- Knoxville Journal (Knoxville [Iowa]) 1855–185?
  - Knoxville Weekly Journal (Knoxville, Marion County, Iowa) 185?–1860
  - Marion County Republican (Knoxville, Marion County, Iowa) 1860–1867
  - Iowa Voter (Knoxville, Iowa) 1867–1874
