= The Iowa Jewish News =

Defunct newspaper

Cover of The Iowa Jewish News

The Iowa Jewish News was a Jewish weekly newspaper published from Des Moines, Iowa, the United States 1932–1952. The first issue was published on April 22, 1932, the last issue was published on May 2, 1952. The Iowa Jewish News was published on Fridays. Jack Wolfe was the editor of The Iowa Jewish News. In its later period, the publication had a circulation of 1,817.

== See also ==
- List of newspapers in Iowa
- List of Jewish newspapers
