= Augustus W. Peters =

American lawyer (1844–1898)

Augustus Winniett Peters
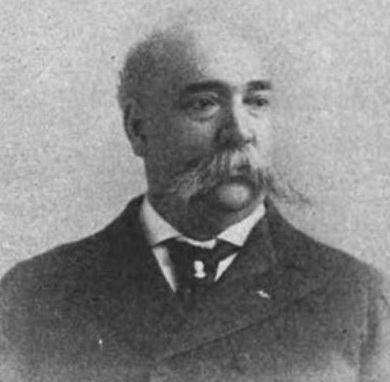

1st Manhattan Borough President
- In office January 1, 1898 – December 29, 1898
- Succeeded by: James Jay Coogan

Personal details
- Born: June 10, 1844 Saint John, New Brunswick
- Died: December 29, 1898 (aged 54) Manhattan, New York City

Augustus Winniett Peters (June 10, 1844 – December 29, 1898) was a Canadian-born New York City political figure who served as the 1st Manhattan Borough President.

== Biography ==
Peters was born in Saint John, New Brunswick, on June 10, 1844. He was raised and educated in New Brunswick, studied law, and became an attorney. In 1867, he moved to New York City as the lawyer for Ralph, King & Halleck, a firm that traded on the New York Gold Exchange. In 1875, he became a member of the Gold Exchange, and in 1876 he was appointed its Secretary. Peters also later became a member of the New York Mining Exchange.

In 1878 Peters became Chairman of the New York Consolidated Exchange, a combination of the several different commodities exchanges. Peters remained as chairman until resigning to take office as Manhattan Borough President. Upon his resignation as chairman, he was appointed the Exchange's Second Vice President.

Peters, a lifelong bachelor, was a veteran of the militia in New Brunswick. He continued his military service in New York, attaining the rank of sergeant major in the New York Old Guard, a ceremonial unit whose members were mostly veterans of previous military service.

A large, athletic man, Peters was involved in several amateur sports clubs and competitions, and was an accomplished cricket player and swimmer. Peters was also a capable singer and amateur actor, and belonged to choirs and drama clubs in New York City.

Peters was also a Freemason and attained the 33rd Degree of the Scottish Rite.

Having become a citizen of the United States soon after arriving in New York, Peters became active in the Tammany Hall Democratic Party organization. In 1893 he became President of Tammany's General Committee, and in 1894 he was an unsuccessful candidate for New York County Sheriff. In 1894 Peters was also an unsuccessful candidate for President of the Board of Aldermen.

In 1897, Peters was elected borough president of Manhattan. The five borough presidencies were created as the result of organizing Greater New York, which consolidate the five boroughs under one Mayor.

Peters served as borough president until his sudden death from a heart attack at his Manhattan, New York City, home on December 29, 1898. His remains were returned to New Brunswick for burial.

Political offices
Preceded by New position	Borough President of Manhattan; 1897–1898	Succeeded by James J. Coogan
