= Vermillion Institute =

Defunct prestigious school in Hayesville, Ohio

Coordinates: 40.77385°N 82.25566°W

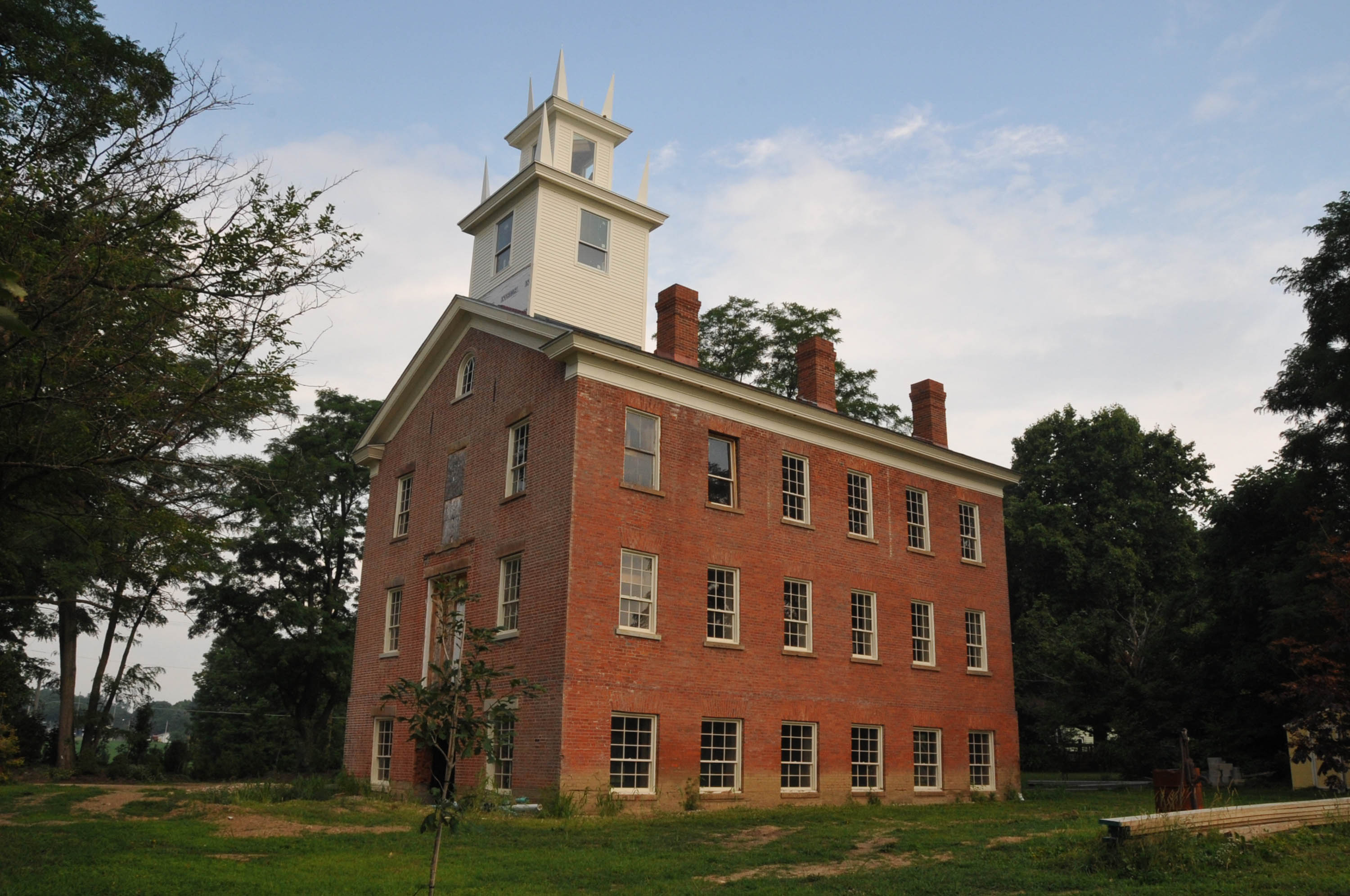

The Vermillion Institute in Hayesville, Ohio was a co-educational school that during the mid- to late 19th century was a preeminent center of higher education that trained people who became prominent in various professions. At one time it was a rival to "Oberlin, Kenyon or Denison". The building also served the home of Hayesville High School (1886–1929).

== History ==
At one time this academy/college had an enrollment of about 600 students who came from 13 states. Founded 1843 as one of the first institutions of higher education in north central Ohio, it was chartered by Ohio Legislature March 4, 1845. Originally Baptist, by 1849 it became Presbyterian-affiliated. Its cornerstone was laid July 4, 1845. Future U. S. President Rutherford B. Hayes was said to have attended the dedication, music for which was provided by the Jeromesville, Ohio band. It was built by Edwin Hubbard and its design is credited to Ashland native Ozias S. Kinney (1811–1869), who later was an architect in Chicago.

=== Conversion to private academy ===
Longtime leader at the Vermillion Institute was Professor Saunders Diefendorf, a Yale-educated Presbyterian minister, who was the principal in 1851. Enrollment declined as students and faculty left to fight in the American Civil War and the institute went into a long slow decline. Diefendorf left Hayesville in 1866 after the Vermillion Institute was not accepted as the site for the new Presbyterian college, which instead went to Wooster.

After its rejection as the site of a new Church of God college, located later at Findlay, Ohio, the institute property was sold back to Hayesville and operated as a private academy. Diefendorf returned to head this reorganized school, which was a preparatory academy to the College of Wooster. It later became the Hayesville High School.

The 1929 opening of new combined elementary and high school at the opposite end of the village meant the end of public use of the Vermillion Institute. It was partially used for social organizations but was largely abandoned. A tall stone fountain with memorial plaques once stood in front of the building, until its removal in the 1950s to nearby Kendig Park.

== Structure ==
This 35 by 50 ft. three-story brick building with gable roof and two-stage tower with pinnacles is the surviving main building of the Vermillion Institute. The ground floor was an assembly space used for daily chapel services. The second floor had classrooms and a library and meeting rooms for literary societies were on the third floor. During its operation, two-story flanking frame buildings served as men's and women's dormitories, but these no longer stand. The thick brick walls with flat-arched lintels over its numerous windows enabled the building to stand through years of neglect.

== Rehabilitation ==
In 2011 the property was purchased by preservation consultant Steven McQuillin and an extensive rehabilitation was begun, with assistance from the Ohio Preservation Tax Credit. The two-foot-thick brick walls of the building were repointed and strengthened by filling the chimney cavities with reinforced concrete and pouring a concrete wall inside the rubble sandstone base. Masonry walls were braced and repointed and the wood structure removed. Deteriorated hewn wood trusses were replaced with new wood trusses. The new structure re-creates floors at their original levels.

The long-missing tower was reconstructed and contains a two-level office space featuring cherry woodwork and stained glass windows, plus a winding staircase leading to the main two-story cherry staircase. The ground floor is a meeting space. The second floor has a great room space, combining kitchen and living areas. The northeast corner has a dining room with a table built from old timbers taken from the building and whose walls will have scenic murals. The third floor has a library on the east side with books on preservation and historic atlases and two rooms connected by a large bathroom on the west side. The fourth floor has an open space overlooking the library and a rear bedroom.

== Notable alumni ==
- John K. Cowan, president, B. & O. R. R.
- Ralph E. Diffendorfer (1879–1951), founder of the International Christian University (ICU) and co-designer of the Christian flag (1907)
- Congressmen Ephraim Eckley
- Dr. Frank S. Fox, founder of Capital College of Oratory and Music, Columbus
- Rev. Sheldon Jackson (1834–1909), missionary, explorer, Alaska education commissioner, introduced reindeer and procured a Lapp Colony for Alaska; Sheldon Jackson College and Museum, Sitka, Alaska, named for him
- Samuel J. Kirkwood (1813–94), Iowa Governor 1860-64 and 1876–77; U. S. Senator 1865-67 and 1877–81, U.S. Secretary of the Interior, 1881–82
- Henry Solomon Lehr (1838–1923) founder and president, Ohio Northern University
- Congressman Thomas Lot
- U.S. Senator Atlee Pomerene (1863–1937), special prosecutor for the Teapot Dome scandal and 1928 Presidential candidate
- Julia Rice Seney (1853—1915), writer, newspaper editor, government administrator, and charity worker
- William Strong (1827–1900), New York City mayor who gave Theodore Roosevelt his first political job; last mayor before consolidation
- Ohio Supreme Court Justice William White

== Additional sources ==
- Baughman, A. J. History of Ashland County, Ohio, pp. 181–82, S. L. Clarke Publishing Co., 1909
- Baughman, p. 181
- Plank, Betty, Historic Ashland County, pp. 233–34. Ashland: Ashland County Historical Society, 1987.
- Plank Betty, Early History of Hayesville, Hayesville Academy and Vermillion Township, ca. 1976
- Cleveland Landmarks Commission, Cleveland Architects - Ozias Kinney
- Haycox, Stephen W., :Sheldon Jackson in Historical Perspective: Alaska Native Schools and Mission Contracts, 1885-1894". The Pacific Historian, Vo. XXVIII, No. 1, PP. 18–28.
- Biographical Directory of the United States Congress, p. 1750
- The National Cyclopaedia of American Biography (1922), p. 6
- Caliendo, Ralph J., New York City Mayors Part 1: The Mayors of New York Before 1898. Xlibris, 2010, pp. 380–393.
- A Centennial Biographical History of the City of Columbus and Franklin County, p. 387
- Plank, HAC, pp. 233.
- Japan ICU Foundation, "History of the Japan ICU Foundation". June 22, 2012, pub. on line
