= Thomas Francis Gilroy =

90th Mayor of New York City (from 1893 to 1894)

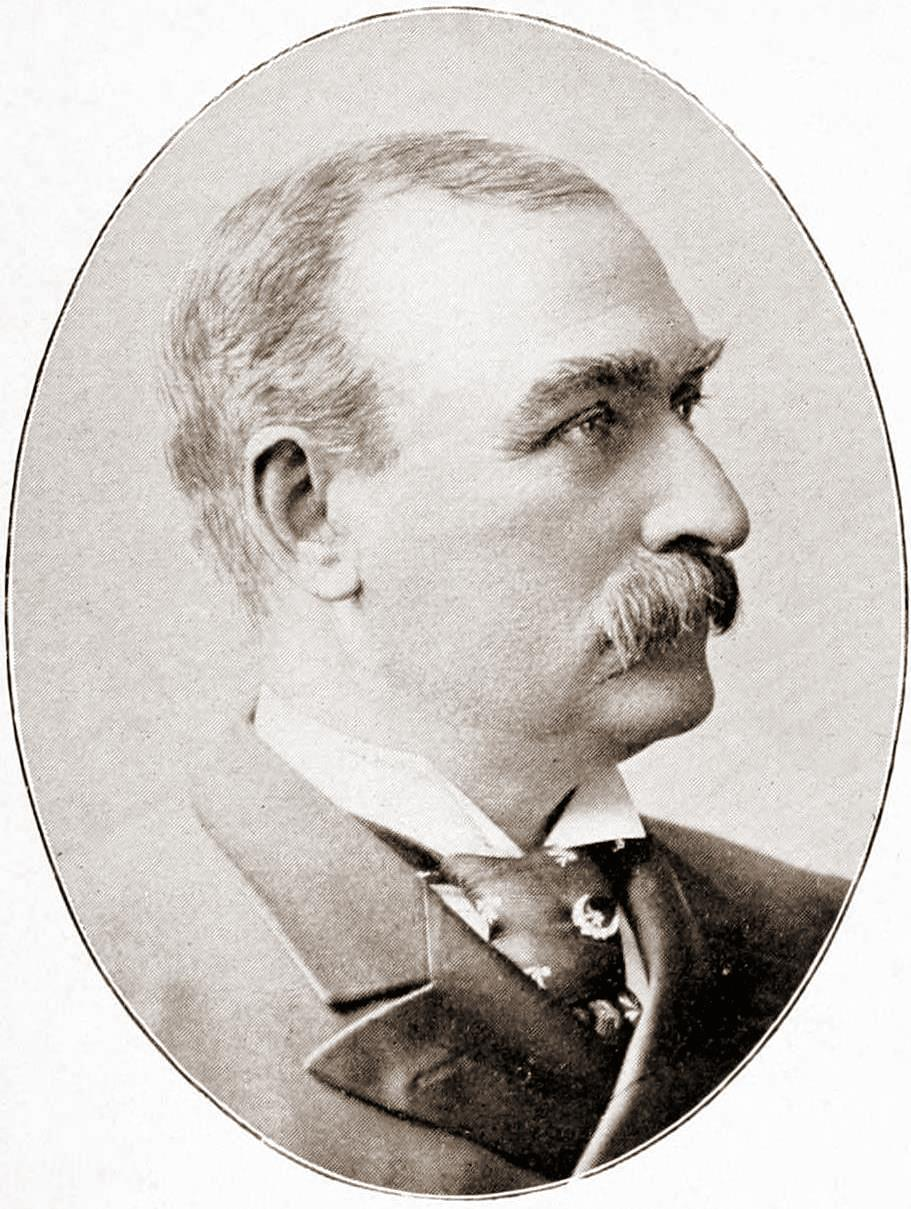
- Gilroy as depicted in Notable New Yorkers of 1896-1899 : a companion volume to King's handbook of New York City by Moses King

90th Mayor of New York City
- In office 1893–1894
- Preceded by: Hugh J. Grant
- Succeeded by: William Lafayette Strong

Personal details
- Born: June 3, 1840 Sligo, Ireland
- Died: December 1, 1911 (aged 71) New York City, New York, U.S.
- Resting place: Woodlawn Cemetery
- Party: Democratic

Thomas Francis Gilroy (June 3, 1840 – December 1, 1911) was an Irish-American politician who served as the 90th mayor of New York City from 1893 to 1894. Born in Sligo, Ireland, Gilroy immigrated to the United States as a child and became involved in New York's publishing industry and later municipal government. A member of the Democratic Party and Tammany Hall, Gilroy rose from holding clerical positions to become Secretary of the General Committee and Grand Sachem before managing the successful mayoral campaign of Hugh J. Grant.

As Commissioner of Public Works from 1889 to 1893, Gilroy gained a reputation for municipal reform and efficiency. His mayoral tenure was marked by challenges as the 1894 Lexow Committee exposed widespread corruption within the New York Police Department, directly implicating Tammany Hall but not Gilroy himself. Choosing not to seek re-election, he was succeeded by William Lafayette Strong, a reform candidate supported by Republicans and anti-Tammany Democrats. After his political career, Gilroy served as president of the Twelfth Ward Bank and retired from public life.

== Biography ==
Gilroy was born in Sligo, Ireland, and immigrated with his parents to New York City at age seven. His father died soon afterwards, and he left school at age 16 to begin working in the publishing business, where he eventually became a proofreader. He later served as a court clerk, and Deputy County Clerk and Undersheriff for New York County.

Active in the Democratic Party, from his early 20s he was a key member of the Tammany Hall organization, beginning as a messenger for "Boss" William Tweed, and serving as confidential secretary for Henry W. Genet, Tweed's Tammany Hall successor.

In 1889, Gilroy managed the successful mayoral campaign of Hugh J. Grant, and as a reward was appointed Commissioner of Public Works, a post he held from 1889 to 1893.

From 1890 to 1892, Gilroy was the titular head of Tammany Hall, the organization's Grand Sachem. In fact, the boss of the organization continued to be Richard Croker, who was the organization's unofficial leader from 1886 to 1902.

In 1893 Gilroy succeeded Grant as Mayor. His administration was largely defined by the 1894 Lexow Investigation, which uncovered widespread police department corruption that was directly linked to Tammany. Gilroy did not run for reelection, and was succeeded in 1895 by reform candidate William L. Strong, who ran with the backing of Republicans and anti-Tammany Democrats.

Gilroy was a Delegate to the 1896 Democratic National Convention. Afterwards, he withdrew from politics, and served as President of the Twelfth Ward Bank until retiring in 1901.

== Family ==
He had a daughter, Frances E. Gilroy, who married Edward A. Maher Jr.

== Death and burial ==
He died on December 1, 1911, at his home on Ocean Avenue, Far Rockaway, Long Island and he was buried at Woodlawn Cemetery in the Bronx.

== See also ==
- List of people from Harlem

Political offices
Preceded by Hugh J. Grant	Mayor of New York City; 1893–1894	Succeeded by William Lafayette Strong
