= Joel Erhardt =

American police commissioner (1838–1909)

Joel B. Erhardt
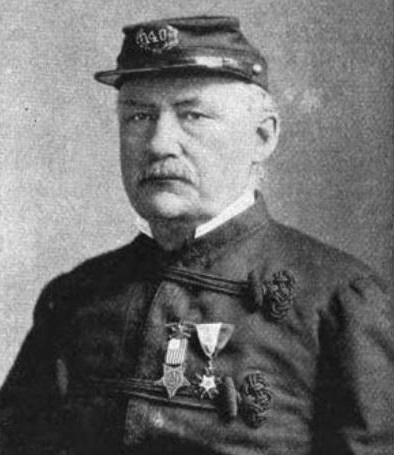
- Joel B. Erhardt, New York military and political figure
- Born: Joel Benedict Erhardt; February 21, 1838; Pottstown, Pennsylvania, United States
- Died: September 8, 1909 (aged 71); Manhattan, New York
- Resting place: Green-Wood Cemetery
- Education: University of Vermont
- Occupations: Politician, civil servant, lawyer and businessman
- Known for: NYPD police commissioner, Collector of the Port of New York and Republican candidate for the Mayor of New York in 1888.
- Political party: Republican Party
- Spouse: Nora Belle Jewett
- Children: 1 daughter

Joel Benedict Erhardt (February 21, 1838 – September 8, 1909) was an American politician, civil servant, lawyer and businessman. He served as the police commissioner for the New York Police Department, U.S. Marshal for the Eastern District of New York, the Collector of the Port of New York and was the Republican candidate who ran against Hugh J. Grant for the Mayor of New York in 1888.

== Early life ==
Joel Benedict Erhardt was born in Pottstown, Pennsylvania and moved with his parents, John Erhardt and Louisa Benedict, to New York City at the age of three. He came from a poor background, it being necessary for him to work in order to pay for the costs of public schooling, and was employed as messenger and clerk. Erhardt continued to work his way through college, becoming a schoolteacher in Upper Jay, New York, attending the University of Vermont. He continued his studies up until the start of the American Civil War whereupon he volunteered to enlist in the Union Army.

He initially joined the Ninth Militia Regiment, but reportedly anxious for active duty, he left the unit for the Second and then Seventy-First Regiments until finally leaving for the front lines with the Seventh Regiment. He had to borrow the money to pay for his uniform. After his enlistment period was up, he returned to his home state to raise the First Vermont Cavalry serving with them until 1863. He had reached the rank of Captain by that time and, that summer, he was appointed a provost marshal and assigned to New York City where he would oversee enforcing conscription in the Tenth District. Although criticized for the low number of recruits compared to the other provost marshals in the city, Secretary of War Edwin M. Stanton defended Erhardt's efforts stating "The men he enlists may be few but they go to the front and fight, every one of them. They are not bounty jumpers". In the days before the New York Draft Riots, he was confronted by several men with iron bars while trying to collect names in a new tenement building at Broadway and Liberty Street. Erhardt held the men off for three hours while waiting for reinforcements, armed only with his pistol, but was eventually forced to retreat without the names.

== Mid-life ==
After the war, Erhardt became a lawyer and remained in New York serving as Assistant U.S. District Attorney in Brooklyn. In 1876, Erhardt was named as police commissioner of the New York Police Department by Governor Samuel J. Tilden after the dismissal of George Washington Matsell and Abram Disbecker by Mayor William H. Wickham. Erhardt was a strong advocate of introducing a style of military discipline within the department. He also criticized the substitution of one police commissioner as a replacement for the old four-man committee, commenting that "it was an absurdity to have a removable Commissioner at the head of an irremovable force"; however, it was widely speculated that for political reasons Mayor Edward Cooper insisted that charges be brought against the previous police commissioners. Nothing came of the trial, however.

In 1883, Erhardt was appointed U.S. Marshal for the Eastern District of New York by President Chester A. Arthur. He also became receiver of the New York City and Northern Railroad and, by 1888, the annual receipts of the road had risen from $24,000 to $400,000 when he returned control of the line to its owners. He was made its president of the company following its reorganization. That same year, he was nominated by the Republican Party to run for the Mayor of New York. Elihu Root, then U.S. District Attorney and a personal friend of Erhardt while a U.S. Marshal, publicly endorsed his candidacy stating:

His name is the synonym for the faithful discharge of duty. In his business regulations he has won the respect and admiration of all who know him. As a public officer, when fortunes were within his grasp, not a thought of seizing them entered his mind. He is a man vigorously positive, determined, honest, generous and able. Not a stain has been cast on his name. Not a man can say a word against him to impeach his qualifications for the Mayoralty of New York.

One of seven candidates, it was suggested at the time that Erhardt had merely been placed on the ticket as a political sacrifice for the Republicans. In spite of this, he made a strong showing in the race but was defeated by the Tammany Hall candidate Hugh J. Grant. Partly due to his popularity in the election, Erhardt was made Collector of the Port of New York shortly afterwards. His appointment was only reluctantly made by Thomas C. Platt, then a leader of the Republican Party in New York, and because of Erhardt's resistance against the city's political machine he and his followers did everything within their power to interfere with and otherwise undermine Erhardt. He finally resigned in 1891 announcing that "the Collector has been reduced to a position where he is no longer an independent officer with authority commensurate with his responsibility". This was the last position he would ever hold.

== Later life ==
He was a successful businessman in his later years, serving as the president and director of the Public Accountants' Corporation, trustee of the Bowery Savings Bank, director of Echo Lake Ice Company and interested in several other major corporations. Erhardt was also the director for the Society for the Prevention of Cruelty to Animals until 1906 when he resigned due to a dispute with the management of the society. He was a member of the Union League Club, Loyal Legion, New England Society, Saint Nicholas Society, Sphinx and Downtown Clubs.

In September 1909, Erhardt was staying at the Union League Club while his wife, Nora Belle Jewett, was visiting their daughter at York Harbor, Maine for part of the summer. He had told his private secretary that he had not been feeling well, believing he may have developed rheumatism, and his friends at the club noticed that he had been in ill health during the last month but appeared well while staying at the club. On the morning of September 7, at about 1:00 a.m., the club watchman was passing Erhardt's room and saw him sitting at the side of his bed. Erhardt told them to get a doctor at once. His family physician, Dr. John Solley, was called from his home on West Fifty-Eighth Street but Erhardt died at 1.20 a.m. At the time of his death, he was the president of the Lawyers' Surety Company and a director in a number of corporations.

Government offices
| Preceded by Daniel Magone | Collector of the Port of New York; 1889–1891 | Succeeded by Jacob Sloat Fassett |
