= Altoona Herald-Mitchellville Index =

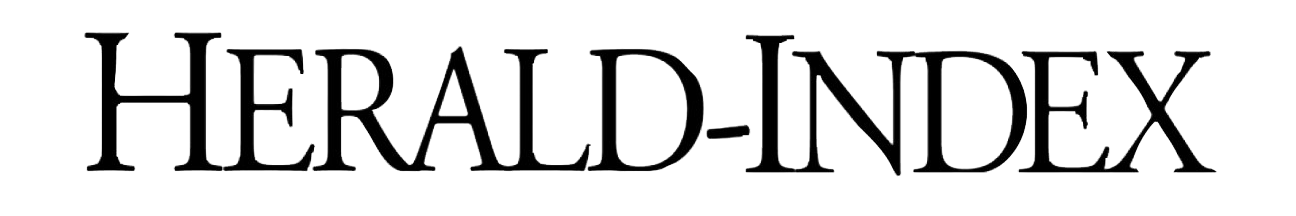

- Front page from June 27, 2012
- Type: Weekly newspaper
- Format: Broadsheet
- Owner(s): Des Moines Register, Gannett Company
- Editor: Adam Wilson
- Founded: 1890 (as The Altoona Rustler)
- Headquarters: 715 Locust Street; Des Moines, Iowa 50309; United States
- Circulation: 1,324
- Website: altoonaherald.com

The Altoona Herald-Mitchellville Index is the weekly newspaper of Altoona, Iowa and the surrounding area.
