= Daily Iowegian =

American newspaper in Missouri (1883–2020)

- Type: Daily newspaper
- Format: Broadsheet
- Owner(s): CNHI, LLC
- Publisher: Becky Maxwell
- Editor: Kyle Ocker
- Founded: April 7, 1883 (142 years ago)
- Language: English
- Ceased publication: May 22, 2020 (5 years ago)
- Headquarters: 201 North 13th Street, Centerville, Iowa 52544 United States
- Circulation: 2,751 daily (Daily Iowegian), 14,185 Wednesday (Ad Express)
- Website: dailyiowegian.com

The Daily Iowegian was a two-day (Tuesday and Friday) newspaper published in Centerville, Iowa and covering Appanoose and Wayne counties in Iowa and Putnam county in Missouri. It was owned by CNHI, LLC

The newspaper also published a Wednesday newspaper/shopper called Ad Express and has more than five times the circulation of the other days' papers.

The Daily Iowegian published its final edition on May 22, 2020, after announcing it was merging with the Ottumwa Courier.

== History ==
What is now known as the Daily Iowegian first published on April 7, 1883, as the "Industrial Iwegian." The moniker of the newspaper then was "A paper devoted to the interests of the industrial classes."

At the time it was founded, there were two other newspapers in the county: The Centerville Citizen (established in 1864) and the Centerville Journal.

Over the years, papers began consolidating. The Industrial Iwegian changed its name to the semi-weekly Iowegian.

In 1916, the Centerville Citizen and semi-weekly Iowegian combined, creating the current newspaper known as the Daily Iowegian.

In 1983, Appanoose County Publishing purchased the Iowegian. They combined it with the Ad Express, a free shopper.

In 1999, Community Newspaper Holdings, Inc. (later shortened to CNHI) purchased the Daily Iowegian and Ad Express.

The paper ceased publication and merged with Ottumwa Courier in May 2020, making it one of 16 publications shut down by owner CNHI due to business losses associated with the economic impact of the COVID-19 pandemic in the United States.
