= Ottumwa Courier =

American newspaper in Iowa, founded 1848

- Southeast Iowa's Best Newspaper
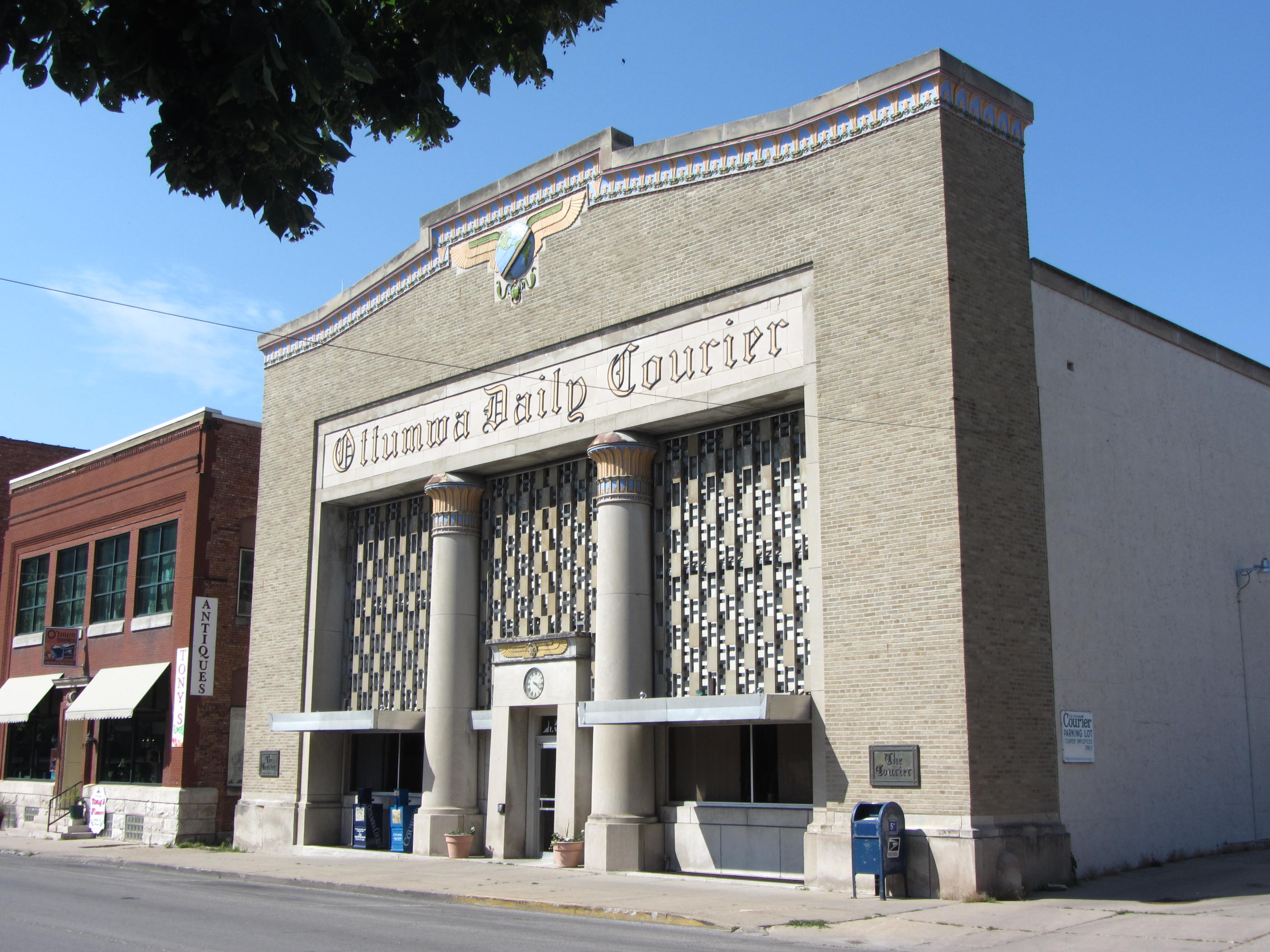
- Ottumwa Courier Building
- Type: Daily newspaper
- Format: Broadsheet
- Owner(s): CNHI
- Publisher: Kyle Ocker
- Editor: Kyle Ocker
- Associate editor: Donald Promnitz
- Founded: August 8, 1848
- Headquarters: 213 East Second Street, Ottumwa, Iowa 52501 United States
- City: Ottumwa, Iowa
- Circulation: 4,451 (as of April 2023)
- Sister newspapers: Iowa: Clinton Herald; The Oskaloosa Herald
- Website: www.ottumwacourier.com
- Free online archives: https://ottumwa.advantage-preservation.com

The Ottumwa Courier (formerly called Ottumwa Daily Courier) is a two-day (Tuesday and Saturday) newspaper published in Ottumwa, Iowa, United States, and covering Wapello County, Iowa and surrounding counties. It is owned by CNHI. The newspaper's front page bills itself "Southeast Iowa's Best Newspaper."

== History ==
Publishing since 1848, and as a daily newspaper from 1865 to 2020, the Courier is Ottumwa's oldest business. In 1890, it was the original flagship of A.W. Lee's media company, later called Lee Enterprises. The company sold the Courier to Liberty Publishing Group in 1999; two years later, Liberty sold it to CNHI, which has owned it since then.

In May 2020, the CNHI newspaper Daily Iowegian was discontinued and merged with Ottumwa Courier; this was one of the 16 publications shut down by owner CNHI due to business losses associated with the economic impact of the COVID-19 pandemic in the United States.

In March 2025, the newspaper announced it would be eliminating its Thursday publication citing rising costs associated with producing and delivering a print publication.
