= Clinton Herald =

American newspaper in Iowa, founded 1856

- Type: Daily newspaper
- Format: Broadsheet
- Owner: CNHI
- Editor: Chris Baldus
- General manager: Christopher Mussmann
- Founded: 1856 (170 years ago)
- Headquarters: 221 Sixth Avenue South, Clinton, Iowa 52733 United States
- Circulation: 3,250 (as of January, 2026)
- Sister newspapers: Iowa: Ottumwa Courier; The Oskaloosa Herald
- Website: www.clintonherald.com

The Clinton Herald is a three-day (Tuesday, Thursday, Saturday) daily newspaper published in Clinton, Iowa, and covering Clinton and Jackson counties in Iowa, and Carroll and Whiteside counties in Illinois.

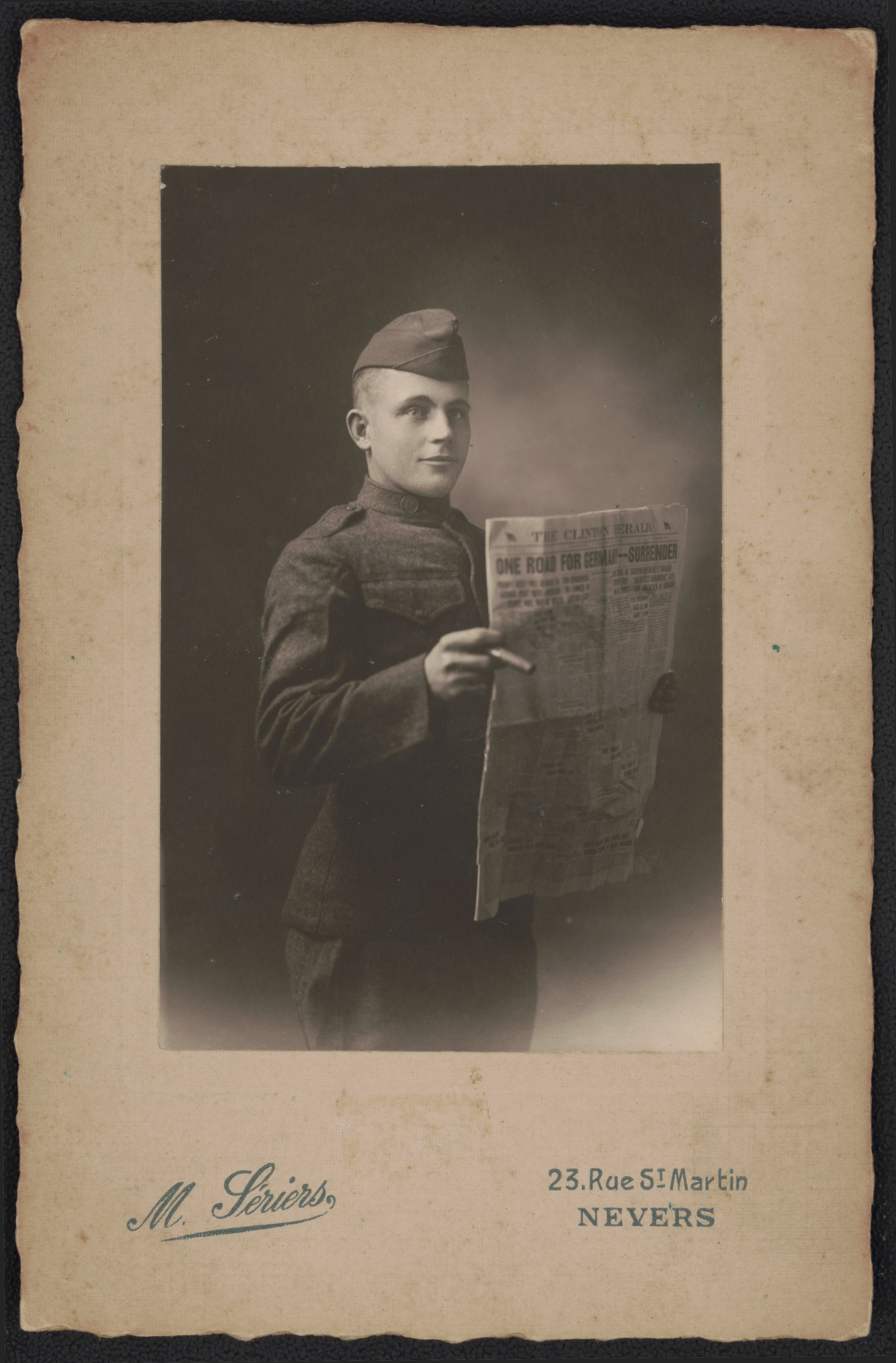
Sergeant Jesse Cassius Barnett of Battery B, 57th Artillery, Coast Artillery Corps, in uniform with the Clinton Herald newspaper, with the headline "One Road for Germany - Surrender" and a cigar (1918)

== Overview ==
It is owned by CNHI. The paper was founded in 1856 by the publisher Charles E. Leonard, the husband of suffragist Cynthia Leonard and father of Lillian Russell.

The newspaper's marketing slogans include "News About You!" and "Where It's At!"
