= Tama-Toledo News Chronicle =

Defunct US regional newspaper in Tama, Iowa

- Type: Weekly newspaper
- Owner: Ogden Newspapers
- Managing editor: Robert Maharry
- General manager: Rhonda James
- Founded: 1853 (as the Toledo Chronicle)
- City: Tama, IA
- Sister newspapers: North Tama Telegraph
- Website: tamatoledonews.com

The Tama-Toledo News Chronicle is a regional newspaper based in Tama, Iowa. The paper is owned by Ogden Newspapers

== History ==
The Toledo Chronicle was founded in 1853. The Tama Citizen, founded in 1866, was bought by The Tama Herald which was later consolidated with The Tama News to create the Tama News-Herald. In May 2020, Ogden Newspapers merged the Toledo Chronicle and the Tama News-Herald to form the Tama-Toledo News Chronicle.
