= Cynthia Leonard =

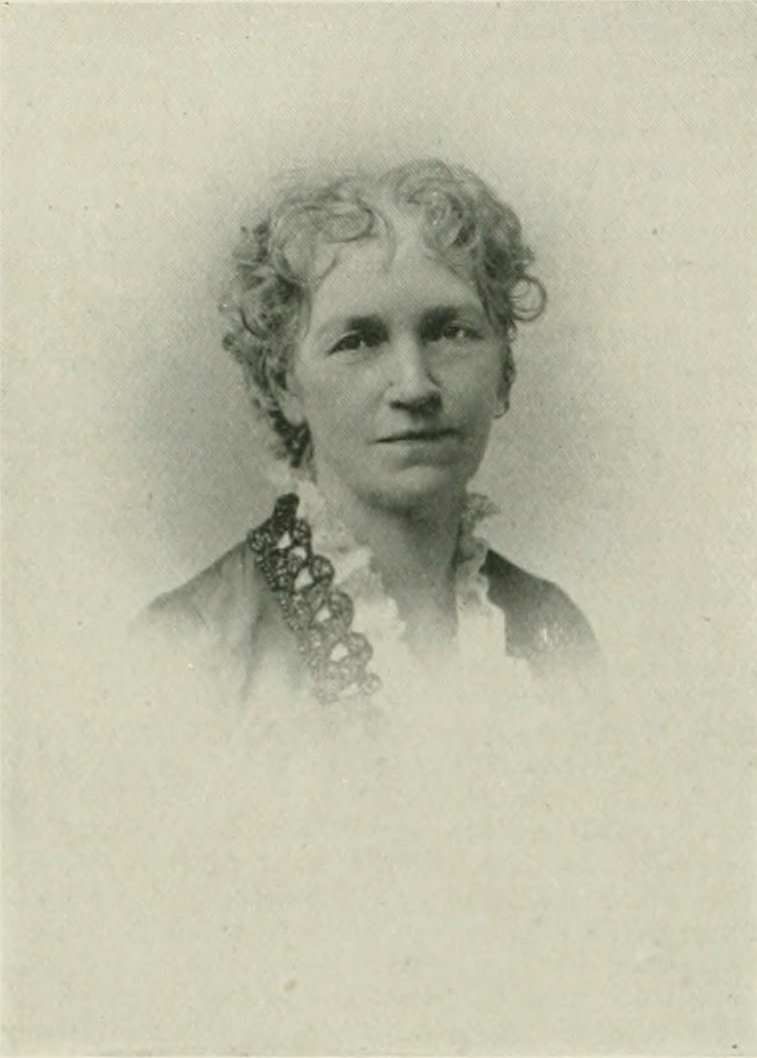
Leonard in "A Woman of the Century"

Cynthia Hicks Van Name Leonard (February 28, 1828 – April 9, 1908) was a suffragist, aid worker and writer, notable for her pioneering efforts toward social reform. In 1888, she became the first woman to run for mayor of New York City.

== Biography ==
Born Cynthia Hicks Van Name in Buffalo, New York to John Van Name and Rachel Hicks. She married Charles Egbert Leonard, a printer with Jewett Thomas & Co, in 1852. They had eight children, the most famous of whom was entertainer Lillian Russell.

While a young woman in Buffalo, Leonard became the first woman to stand behind a counter as a salesperson and later became a member of Buffalo's first Woman's Social and Literary Club. Four years after her marriage, in 1856, the couple moved from Detroit, Michigan, to Clinton, Iowa, where Charles founded the Clinton Herald, that community's newspaper, still in existence today. Cynthia Leonard was on the executive committee of the Soldiers' Relief Association, which established the first soldiers' home in the state of Iowa, attending to the housing needs of Union soldiers recently released from the 18th Regimental Hospital, then quartered in Clinton.

In 1863, Charles sold the Herald, and the couple moved to Chicago. There Leonard organized a fair to benefit the Freedman's Aid Society, helped found the Chicago branch of Sorosis and was editor of its newsweekly for a time, and was a member of the Chicago Philosophical Society. In 1869, she led the spiritualist faction of the women's suffrage movement at the Music Hall, one of the first women's suffrage meetings ever held in Chicago. Susan B. Anthony was a frequent visitor to the Leonard home. In 1880, working with the Ladies Lecture Bureau, she helped organize a number of benefits for the Irish Famine. She was afterward accused of taking for herself some of the funds raised at one of these events.

Leonard organized the Good Samaritan Society, and after the Great Chicago Fire in 1881, she established a homeless shelter for the "unfortunate" women of the city. She was instrumental in the decision to place matrons in Chicago prisons, and she authored two novels: Adventures of Lena Rouden, or the Rebel Spy and Fading Footprints, or the Last of the Iroquois.

After she separated from her husband, Leonard took their two youngest daughters, Nellie and Suzanne, to New York City to launch the girls' musical careers and to broaden her own political horizons. There she organized the Science of Life Club and in 1880 managed a benefit for starving women and children in Ireland. In 1888, she became the first woman to run for mayor of New York City. She died on the morning of April 9, 1908, aged 80, at the home of her daughter, Ida, in Rutherford, New Jersey.

In a May 3, 1914, interview with Djuna Barnes, Lillian Russell paid this tribute to her mother:

To be a great woman, a great person, one must have suffered, even ... suffered in great crises. What have I done that I should be famous – nothing but powdered a bit gently the cheeks that God gave me and smoothed the hair that I was born with, laughed and proven a faultless set of teeth. Any grinning idol, well painted, can do as well, but the real women, the big women, are those who toil and never write of it, those who labor and never cry of it, those who forfeit all and never seek reward. Begin this article with the name Lillian Russell, but end it with the name of such as was Cynthia Leonard.

== Sources ==
- Baker, Jean H. Sisters: The Lives of America's Suffragists. Hill and Wang, New York, 2005; ISBN 0-8090-9528-9
- Fields, Armond. Lillian Russell: A Biography of 'America's Beauty' (McFarland & Company 1998) ISBN 0-7864-0509-0
- History of Clinton County, Iowa, 1976 (copyright 1978, Clinton County Historical Society)
- Willard, Frances E. and Mary A. Livermore (eds.) A Woman of the Century: Fourteen Hundred-Seventy Biographical Sketches Accompanied by Portraits of Leading American Women in All Walks of Life. Moulton, 1893.
