= Boone News-Republican =

Local newspaper from Boone, Iowa, US

- Type: Daily newspaper
- Format: Broadsheet
- Owner: USA Today Co.
- Editor: Gena Johnson
- Founded: 1907
- Headquarters: Boone, Iowa, United States
- Circulation: 886
- Website: newsrepublican.com

The Boone News-Republican is a newspaper in Boone, Iowa, United States. It was established in 1907 as a result of a merger between the Boone Daily News, and the Weekly Republican. Former owner Stephens Media sold its newspapers to GateHouse Media in 2015.
