= Fassett Investigation =

1890 investigation into political corruption in the City of New York

The Fassett Investigation, or Fassett Committee, was an 1890 probe by the New York State Senate into political corruption in New York City. The committee was mainly looking for evidence of bribery among appointed officials and the Board of Aldermen. Most of these were Democrats under the leadership of Tammany Hall "Chieftain" Richard Croker and Mayor Hugh Grant.

Some of the most newsworthy testimony came from Croker's brother-in-law, Patrick H. McCann, proprietor of the posh Mount St. Vincent Hotel in Central Park. McCann told how Grant, before he was mayor, once made a present of $25,000 to Croker's six-year-old daughter, Flossie, which he said the Crokers used to purchase a new house. On another occasion, in 1884, Croker dropped in on McCann and showed him a bag with $180,000, explaining that it was cash for bribing the Aldermen so that Grant would be approved as Commissioner of Public Works.

Officially titled the State Senate Committee on Cities and chaired by Republican J. Sloat Fassett, the testimony ran to over 3000 printed pages. However, it brought no indictments or convictions. The Tammany Democrats romped to victory in November 1890 and again in 1892.

Ex-senator Fassett won the Republican nomination for governor in 1891. He lost the election.
