= North Tama Telegraph =

- Type: Weekly newspaper
- Format: Broadsheet
- Owner(s): Ogden Newspapers
- Founded: 1874 (as Traer Clipper)
- Ceased publication: May 2020
- Headquarters: 625 Second St., Traer, Iowa, 50675 United States
- Circulation: 2,500
- Sister newspapers: Tama-Toledo News Chronicle
- Website: northtamatelegraph.com

The North Tama Telegraph is a weekly newspaper published in Traer, Iowa. The paper primarily serves the community of Traer, but also provided news and sports coverage of neighboring communities in Tama County, Iowa. The small towns of Dysart, Buckingham, and Clutier are also included in this coverage area, along with the local school district, North Tama.

== History ==
The Traer Clipper was founded in 1874 and the Traer Star was founded in 1878. The two papers merged in 1883 to form the Traer Star-Clipper. In May 2024, Ogden Newspapers merged the paper with the Dysart Reporter, founded in 1878, to form the North Tama Telegraph.
