= William Lafayette Strong =

American politician

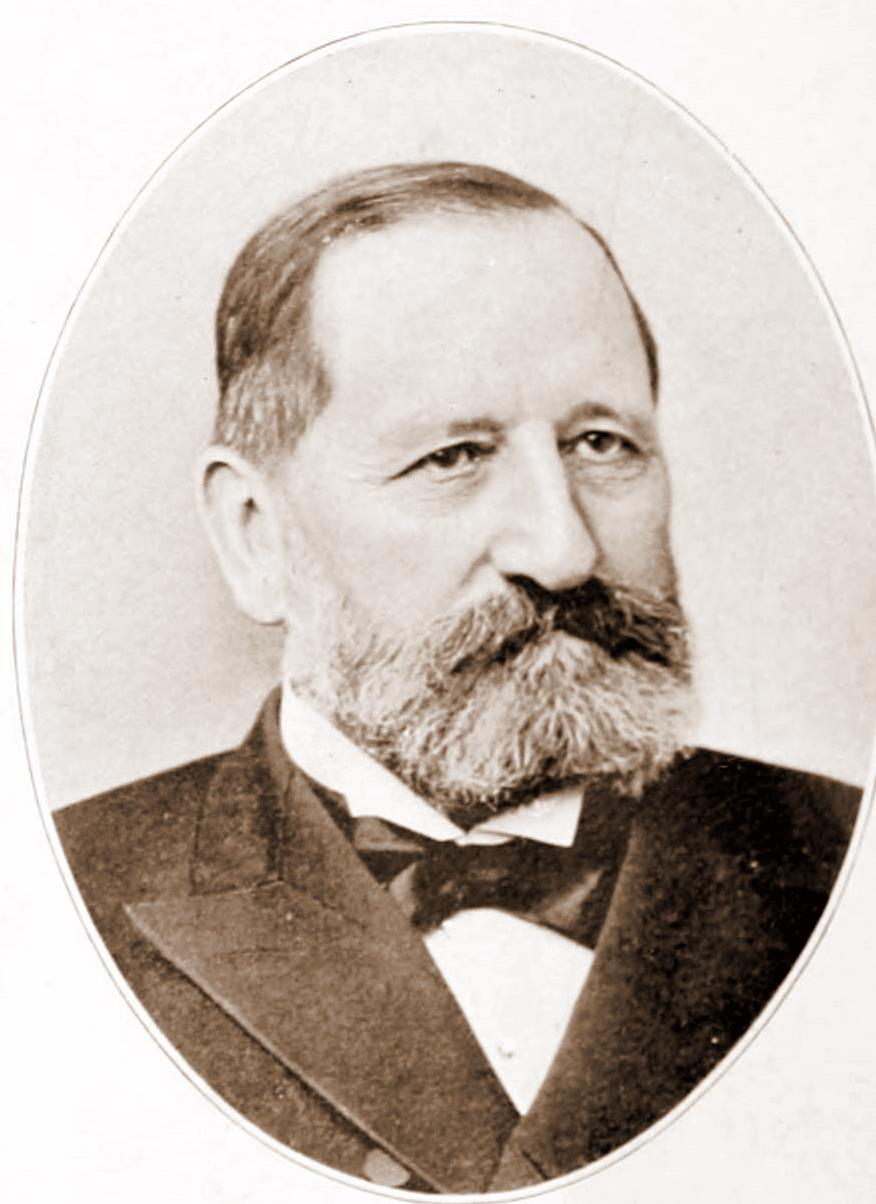

91st Mayor of New York City
- In office January 1, 1895 – December 31, 1897
- Preceded by: Thomas Francis Gilroy
- Succeeded by: Robert Anderson Van Wyck

Personal details
- Born: March 22, 1827 Richland County, Ohio, U.S.
- Died: November 2, 1900 (aged 73) New York City, U.S.
- Resting place: Woodlawn Cemetery
- Party: Republican
- Spouse: Mary Urania Aborn (m. 1866)
- Children: 2
- Parent(s): Abel Strong; Hannah Burdine Strong
- Education: Vermillion Institute

William Lafayette Strong (March 22, 1827 – November 2, 1900) was the 91st Mayor of New York City from 1895 to 1897. He was the last mayor of New York City before the consolidation of the City of Greater New York on January 1, 1898.

== Early life ==
Strong was born on March 22, 1827, near Loudonville, Ohio, in Ashland County. He was the son of Abel Strong, a farmer born in 1792 in Hartford, Connecticut. His mother, Hannah Burdine Strong was born in 1798, and was from Pennsylvania. Strong was the oldest of five children, and despite only a rudimentary rural education, became a clerk in a Wooster dry goods store to help support his family after the death of his father in 1840.

Strong later attended the Vermillion Institute in Hayesville, Ohio.

== Career ==
In 1853, Strong moved to New York City, where he worked at the L.O. Wilson and Company dry goods firm. In the Panic of 1857, the business failed and Strong moved on to work for Farnham, Dale, and Company.

By 1870, he had his own dry goods company, called William L. Strong and Company. It was very successful, opening branches in many cities and eventually making Strong a millionaire. In 1890, Strong became president of the First National Bank.

Strong was also president of the Central National Bank, president of the Homer Lee Bank Note Company, Vice President of the New York Security and Trust Company and director for the Erie Railroad and the Plaza Bank.

=== Political career ===
In the 1880s, Strong became active in politics. He ran for U.S. Congress in 1882 but was unsuccessful.

Strong, a Republican, was elected on a Fusion Party ticket by Republican and anti-Tammany Hall Democrats. Strong served as mayor of New York from January 1, 1895, to December 31, 1897, gaining an extra year on his term because of the impending consolidation of New York City, which moved elections to odd-numbered years. He won by a decisive majority of more than 42,000 votes and was joined in victory by John W. Goff, the Republican candidate for city recorder and a new Republican majority for the New York City Board of Aldermen.

Strong's victory was optimistically hailed by the New York press as representative of an epic defeat of Tammany Hall's "fraud, chicane, trickery, double-dealing and contempt for the moral sense of the community" and the new mayor cast as standard-bearer of "a revolution that closes a dark and opens a bright era in the municipal affairs of New York."

The reform-minded Strong established the New York City Board of Education, created small parks, and is credited as the "father" of the city's Department of Correction. The Department of Public Charities and Correction had been split by Governor Levi Morton in 1894 into two departments. Strong appointed former U.S. Civil Service Commissioner Theodore Roosevelt as Police Commissioner. Roosevelt was noted for fighting corruption and making the police department more professional.

Strong's leadership help pass the School Reform Law in 1896. In the late 1890s, New York State legislators passed a law mandating bath houses for cities with more than 50,000 people. Strong agreed with the law's necessity due to sanitation issues caused by overcrowding. The city's bath houses, originally built for cleanliness and bathing, were later used for recreation.

== Personal life ==
In 1866, Strong married Mary Urania Aborn (1843–1921), the daughter of Robert W. Aborn of New Jersey. Together, Mary and William were the parents of two children:

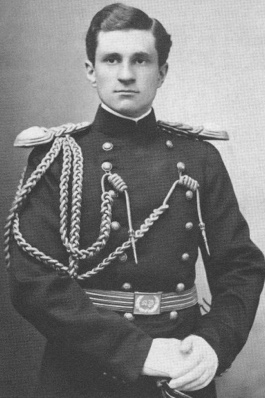
Putnam Bradlee Strong

- Mary Aborn Strong (1868–1935), who married Albert Richardson Shattuck (1854–1924), a wealthy banker from Ohio, in 1889.
- Putnam Bradlee Strong (1875–1945), who married actress May Yohé, the former wife of Lord Francis Hope (later the Duke of Newcastle).

Strong died in his home on November 2, 1900. After complaining of not feeling well, he retired to his room. During the night, he worsened very quickly, and he died early that morning, leaving behind a wife and two adult children. He was interred at Woodlawn Cemetery in the borough of The Bronx in New York City. His widow died of heart disease at The Mount, their daughter's residence in Lenox, Massachusetts (and the former home of author Edith Wharton), in July 1921.

== Legacy ==
The Fire Department of New York operated a fireboat named William L. Strong from 1898 to 1945.

Political offices
Preceded by Thomas Francis Gilroy	Mayor of New York City; 1895–1897	Succeeded by Robert Anderson Van Wyck
