= The Oskaloosa Herald =

American newspaper in Iowa, founded 1850

- Type: Weekly newspaper
- Format: Broadsheet
- Owner: CNHI
- Publisher: Kyle Ocker
- Editor: Kyle Ocker
- Founded: 1850
- Headquarters: 219 High Avenue East, Oskaloosa, Iowa 52577 United States
- Circulation: 1,679 (as of April 2023)
- Sister newspapers: Iowa: Clinton Herald; Ottumwa Courier
- Website: www.oskaloosa.com

The Oskaloosa Herald is a weekly newspaper published in Oskaloosa, Iowa, and covering Mahaska County, Iowa and Marion County, Iowa. The newspaper publishes weekly on Saturdays, and also publishes the Oskaloosa Shopper. It is owned by CNHI.

== History ==
The paper was founded by John R. Needham and Hugh McNelley in 1850. Tri-Cities Newspapers acquired the paper in 1970. Boone Newspapers took over ownership in 1975. Donrey Media Group sold the paper to Community Newspaper Holdings (later shortened to CNHI) in 1998.

In May 2020, the CNHI publications Journal-Express and Pella Chronicle were discontinued and merged with The Oskaloosa Herald; these were two of the 16 publications shut down by owner CNHI due to business losses associated with the economic impact of the COVID-19 pandemic in the United States.

In June 2023, the Herald closed its building on A Avenue West and moved to 219 High Avenue East, near Oskaloosa's town square.

In March 2025, the Herald announced it would cease its Tuesday publication and become a weekly newspaper publishing on Saturdays, citing the rising costs of producing and distributing a printed newspaper.
