= Hugh J. Grant =

Mayor of New York City from 1889 to 1892

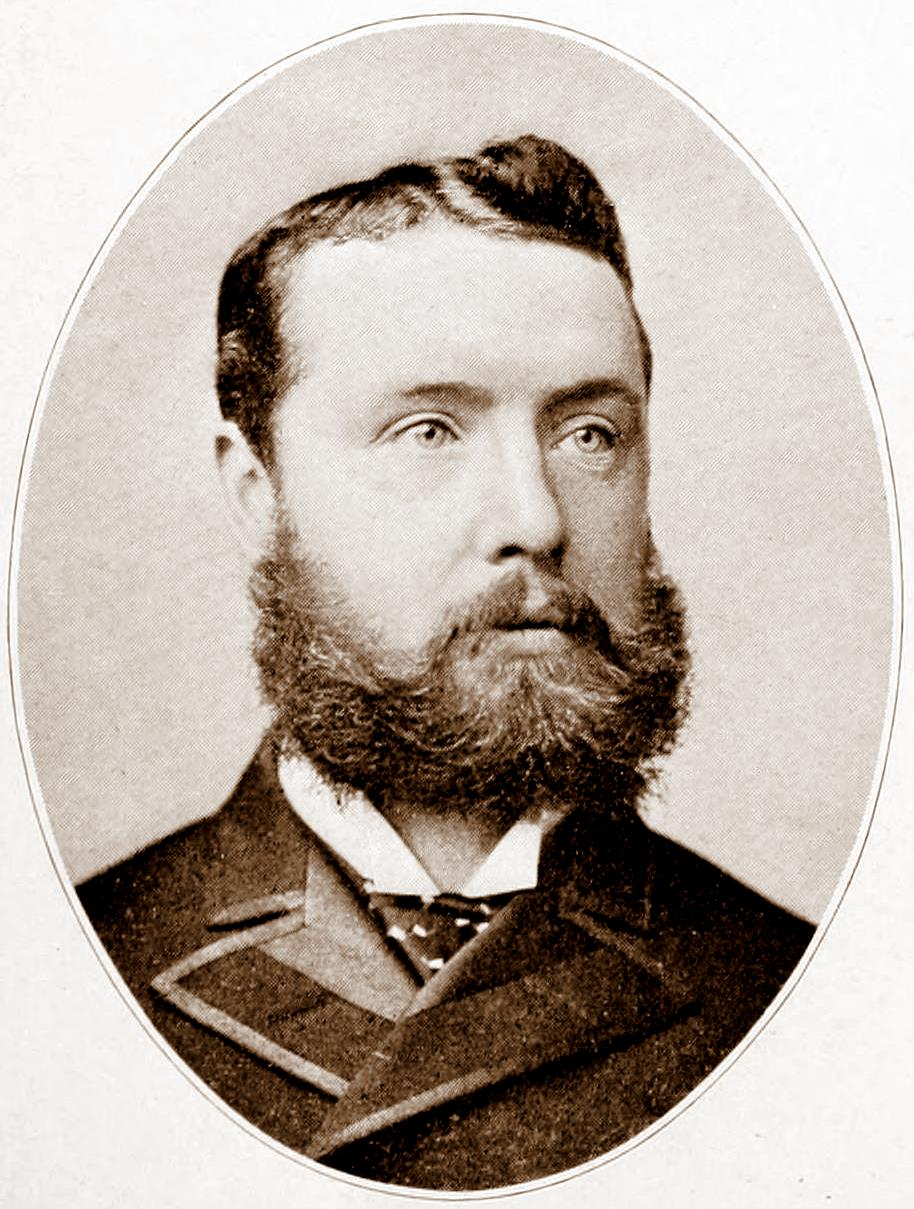

89th Mayor of New York City
- In office January 1, 1889 – December 31, 1892
- Preceded by: Abram Hewitt
- Succeeded by: Thomas Francis Gilroy

Personal details
- Born: September 10, 1858 New York City, U.S.
- Died: November 4, 1910 (aged 52) New York City, U.S.
- Resting place: Calvary Cemetery
- Party: Democratic
- Spouse: Julia M. Murphy (m. 1895)
- Children: 3

Hugh John Grant (September 10, 1858 – November 3, 1910) served as the 89th mayor of New York City for two terms from 1889 to 1892. First inaugurated in 1888 at age 30, he remains the youngest mayor in the city's history. He was one of the youngest mayors of a major American city, and was the second Roman Catholic mayor of New York City. (Note: The first was William R. Grace who served two two-year terms beginning in 1881 and 1885.)

== Life and career ==
Hugh Grant, whose father John Grant had grown rich in politics and real estate, was born on West 27th Street in Manhattan, New York City, on September 10, 1858. He was orphaned young and raised by his guardian, a man named McAleenan. He attended both public and private schools, spent two years at Manhattan College, another year studying in Germany, and two more at Columbia Law School. Though the earliest data, including the United States census of 1860 and 1870 and Grant's 1878 passport application, establish his birth year as 1858, early in his political career he began to present himself as born several years earlier in 1852 or 1853, perhaps to avoid calling attention to his youth. A Tammany Hall Democrat, he began his political career as a city alderman from 1883–1884, where he was one of only two aldermen not caught up in a financial scandal related to the Broadway Surface Railroad. For the remainder of his public career, however, he was a compliant member of Tammany under the patronage and control of its leader Richard Croker.

Grant lost the race for mayor as Tammany's candidate in 1885, but won the office of sheriff in 1886. He was Sheriff of New York County from 1887 to 1888. He was Mayor of New York City from 1889 to 1892, appointing Croker as New York City Chamberlain in 1889. His administrative accomplishments included the reorganization of city administration and the initial stages of placing the city's electrical system underground.

In response to foot-dragging by the hesitant electric companies, Grant took a heavy-handed approach to placing the lines underground. Between 1889 and 1891, he ordered the chopping down of electric light poles before the underground system was prepared, leaving some public areas in darkness, and lambasted the electric companies for delaying the process and then asking to dig up newly repaved roads. His feuds with the electric companies occurred in the context of the Blizzard of 1888 and a severe wind storm in January 1891 – both of which badly damaged the city's growing net of above-ground wiring – and a spate of accidental electrocutions by low-hanging wires in Manhattan in late 1889.

Grant declined to run again at the end of his second term in 1891, but ran once more in 1894 and lost.

The details of Croker's and Tammany's bribes and involvement in criminal activity came to light through the work of the Fassett Investigation of 1890. Grant's role included $25,000 in cash given to Croker's daughter Flossie—supposedly gifts he made as god-father to the little girl. A grand jury described Grant's tenure as Sheriff as "tainted and corrupt". In February 1892, crusading reformist Rev. Charles Parkhurst of the Madison Square Presbyterian Church denounced his administration: "every step that we take looking to the moral betterment of this city has to be taken directly into the teeth of the damnable pack of administrative blood-hounds that are fattening themselves on the ethical flesh and blood of our citizenship." He called Grant and his political colleagues "a lying, perjured, rum-soaked, and libidinous lot" of "polluted harpies."

Grant's business interests ranged from serving as receiver of the St. Nicholas Bank to promoting the development of the Harlem River Speedway, later to become the Harlem River Drive, a track for horse racing, in association with Nathan Straus. Straus named one of his sons Hugh Grant Straus.

A resident of Oradell, New Jersey, who spent most of his time at his home there, Grant died of a sudden heart attack or stroke at his home on East 72nd Street on November 3, 1910. After a funeral at the church of St. Ignatius Loyola on Park Avenue and 84th Street, he was buried in Calvary Cemetery.

=== Marriage ===
On April 30, 1895, Grant wed Julia M. Murphy, the daughter of U.S. Senator Edward Murphy. She had been born on March 11, 1873, the oldest of the Senator's eleven children. When her father went to Washington, D.C., to serve in the U.S. Senate, she accompanied him and acted as his hostess.

Cardinal James Gibbons of Baltimore granted special dispensation for the wedding celebration to be held at the Murphy home at the corner of K and 17th Streets in Washington, D.C., rather than in a church. Archbishop Michael Corrigan of New York officiated, assisted by several priests. Senator Murphy was, like Grant, a political ally of and financial adviser to Richard Croker. After traveling for several months in Europe, the Grants lived and raised three children in their 20-room townhouse at 20 East 72nd Street in New York City.

In 1914, Julia Grant provided a financial bequest, originally anonymous, that provided the funds for establishing Regis High School, a Jesuit high school in New York City that, following her instructions, provides a free education for Catholic boys with special consideration given to those who cannot afford a Catholic education. She did not remarry after her husband's death in 1910 and died at home in May 1944. She was buried alongside her husband in the family mausoleum. Her estate, based entirely on a trust established by her husband, was valued in 1944 at more than $13 million. In 1948, Auxiliary Bishop Stephen J. Donahue dedicated the chapel of Archbishop Stepinac High School as a memorial to her.

Her heirs donated the Grants' home in New York City, a five-story, 11,000-square-foot (1,000 m^{2}) townhouse on Manhattan's Upper East Side in which the family had its own chapel, to the Roman Catholic Archdiocese of New York. It then became the residence of the Vatican's Permanent Observer to the United Nations and the temporary residence of popes who have visited the city.

== Legacy ==
The Grants had three children, Julia M. Grant (1896–1962), Edna M. Grant (1898–1968), and Major Hugh John Grant, Jr., (1904–1981).

Hugh Grant is memorialized in the 1.11-acre (0.45 ha) Hugh J. Grant Circle park in the Bronx, on Westchester Avenue between Virginia Avenue and Metropolitan Avenue. A sign in the park reads:

This park was named after former New York City Mayor Hugh J. Grant (1857 [sic] - 1910) on December 5, 1911 by the Board of Aldermen. A native New Yorker, Grant was educated in Catholic schools in the United States and Berlin before attending Columbia University Law School. His father, the owner of several west side taverns, helped Grant make connections with many local Irish-American organizations that aided his political career. Backed by Tammany Hall, Grant became a New York Alderman in 1882, sheriff of New York in 1885, and finally mayor in 1889. Inaugurated at only 31 years of age, Grant is remembered as New York City's youngest mayor.

In the 1939 play Life with Father, which is set "in the late 1880s", Mr. Day denounces Mayor Grant. The line was retained in the 1947 film adaptation even though the film is set in 1883, before Grant became mayor.

== Sources ==
- Oliver E. Allen, The Tiger: The Rise and Fall of Tammany Hall (Addison-Wesley, 1993)
- Alfred Connable and Edward Silberfard, Tigers of Tammany: Nine Men who Ran New York (NY: Holt, Rinehart and Winston, 1967)
- Lewis Randolph Hamersly, First Citizens of the Republic: An Historical Work Giving Portraits and Sketches of the Most Eminent Citizens of the United States (NY: L.R. Hamersly & Co., 1906)
- Lothrop Stoddard, Master of Manhattan: The Life of Richard Croker (NY: Longmans, Green and Co., 1931)
- M.R. Werner, Tammany Hall (Garden City, NY: Doubleday, Doran & Company, 1928)

Political offices
Preceded by Abram Hewitt	Mayor of New York City; 1889–1892	Succeeded by Thomas Francis Gilroy
