= Richard Croker =

American politician (1843–1922)

Richard "Boss" Croker
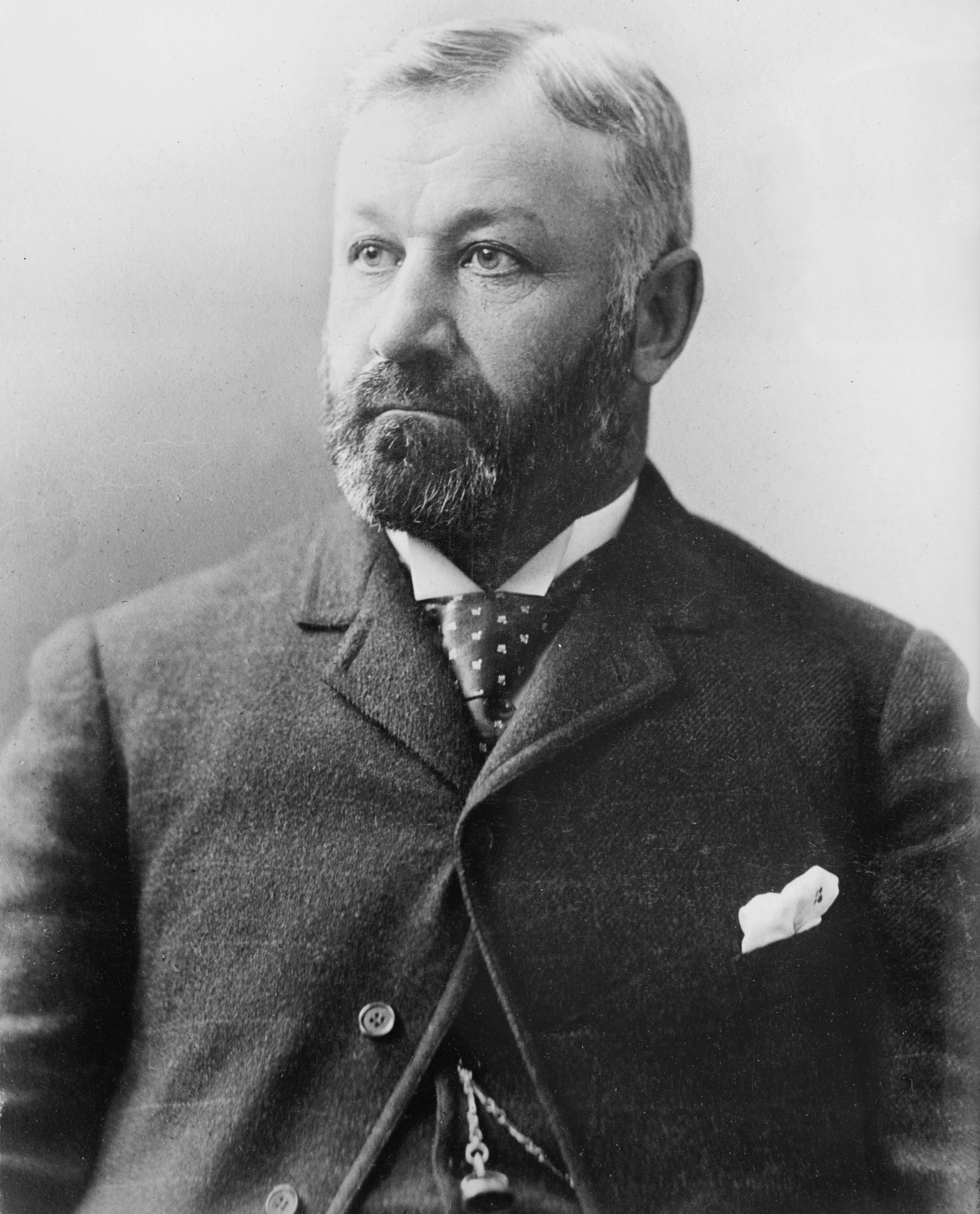

Grand Sachem of Tammany Hall
- In office 1886–1902
- Preceded by: John Kelly
- Succeeded by: Lewis Nixon

Chamberlain of the City of New York
- In office 1889–1890

New York City Fire Commissioner
- In office 1883–1887

Coroner of New York County
- In office 1873–1876

Member of the New York City Council
- In office 1868–1870

Personal details
- Born: November 24, 1843 Ardfield, County Cork, Ireland
- Died: April 29, 1922 (aged 78) Stillorgan, County Dublin, Ireland
- Party: Democratic
- Spouses: Elizabeth Fraser (m. 1873; died 1914) Beulah Edmonson (m. 1914)
- Children: 7
- Profession: Coroner, mobster

Richard Welstead Croker (November 24, 1843 – April 29, 1922), known as "Boss Croker", was an Irish American political boss who was a leader of New York City's Tammany Hall. His control over the city was cemented with the 1897 election of Robert A. Van Wyck as the first mayor of all five boroughs. During his tenure as Grand Sachem, Boss Croker garnered a reputation for corruption and ruthlessness and was frequently the subject of investigations. As his power waned following the 1900 and 1901 elections, Croker resigned his position and returned to Ireland, where he spent the rest of his life.

== Biography ==
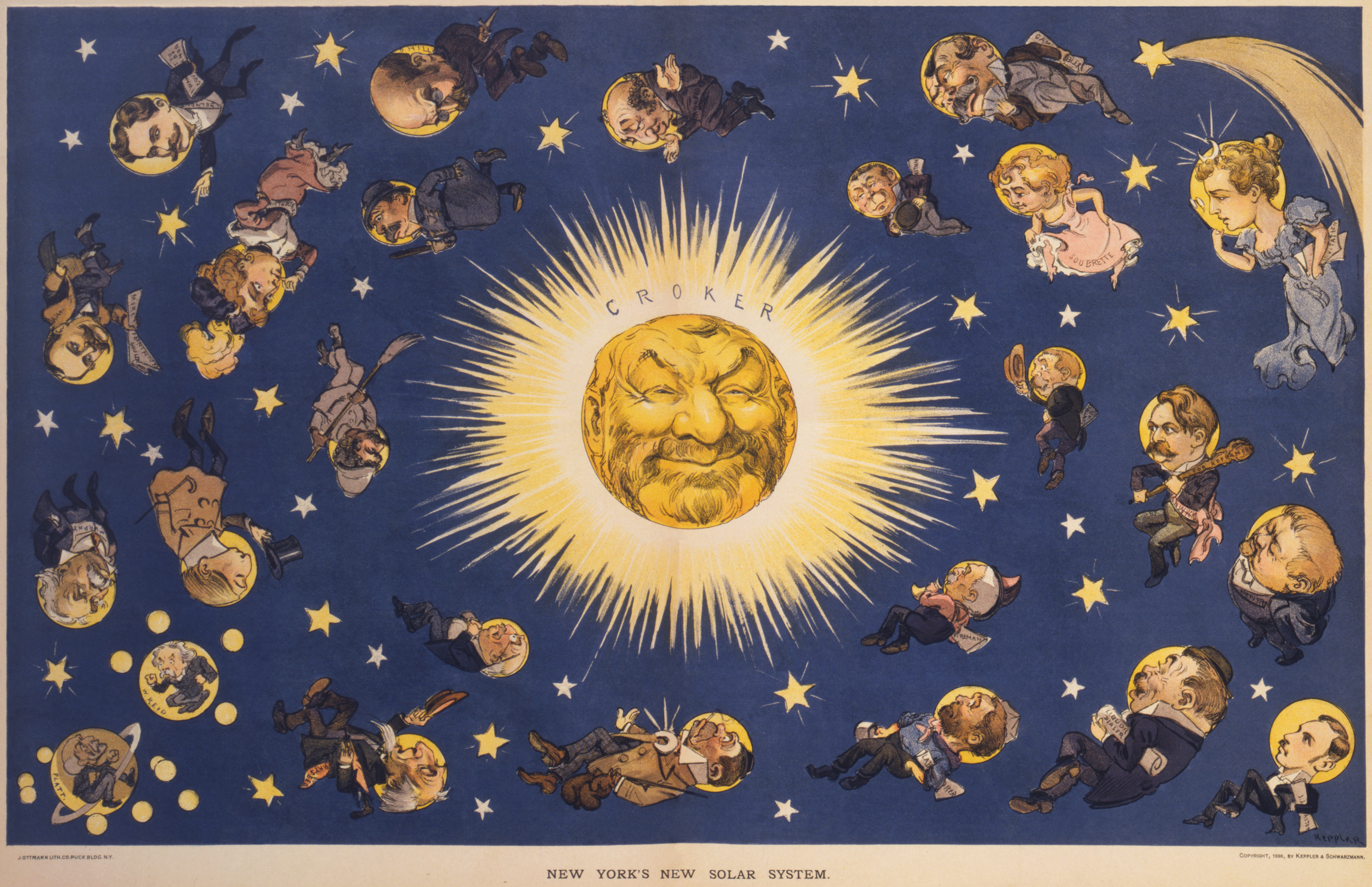
Politicians and people from various professions revolve around Croker, depicted as the sun in this 1898 cartoon from Puck.

Richard Croker was born in the townland of Ballyva, in the parish of Ardfield, six miles south of Clonakilty in County Cork on November 24, 1843, son of Eyre Coote Croker (1800–1881) and Frances Laura Welsted (1807–1894). He was taken to the United States by his parents when he was just two years old. They boarded the Henry Clay in Cobh, County Cork and headed for the land of opportunity.

There were significant differences between this family and the typical family leaving Ireland at that time. They were Protestant, and were not land tenants. Eyre Coote Croker owned an estate in Ardfield, in southwest Cork. Upon arrival in the United States, Eyre Coote Croker was without a profession, but he had a general knowledge of horses and soon became a veterinary surgeon. During the Civil War, he served in that same capacity under General Daniel Sickles.

Richard Croker was educated in New York public schools. Croker dropped out of school at age twelve or thirteen to become an apprentice machinist in the Harlem Railroad machine shops. Not long after, he became a valued member of the Fourth Avenue Tunnel Gang, a street gang that attacked teamsters and other workers that gathered around the Harlem line's freight depot. Croker eventually became the gang's leader. He joined one of the Volunteer Fire Departments in 1863, becoming an engineer of one of the engine companies. That was his gateway into public life. James O'Brien, a Tammany associate, took notice of Croker after Croker won a boxing match against Dick Lynch whereby Croker knocked out all of Lynch's teeth. Croker became a member of Tammany Hall and active in its politics. In the 1860s, he was well known for being a "repeater" at elections, voting multiple times at the polls. He was an alderman from 1868 to 1870, Coroner of New York County, New York, from 1873 to 1876. Croker was charged with the murder of John McKenna, a lieutenant of James O'Brien, during a fight on election day of 1874 with O'Brien's rival political group. O'Brien was running for Congress against the Tammany-backed Abram S. Hewitt. John Kelly, the new Tammany Hall boss, attended the trial, and Croker was freed after the jury was undecided. Croker moved to Harrison, New York by 1880. He was appointed the New York City Fire Commissioner in 1883 and 1887 and city Chamberlain from 1889 to 1900.

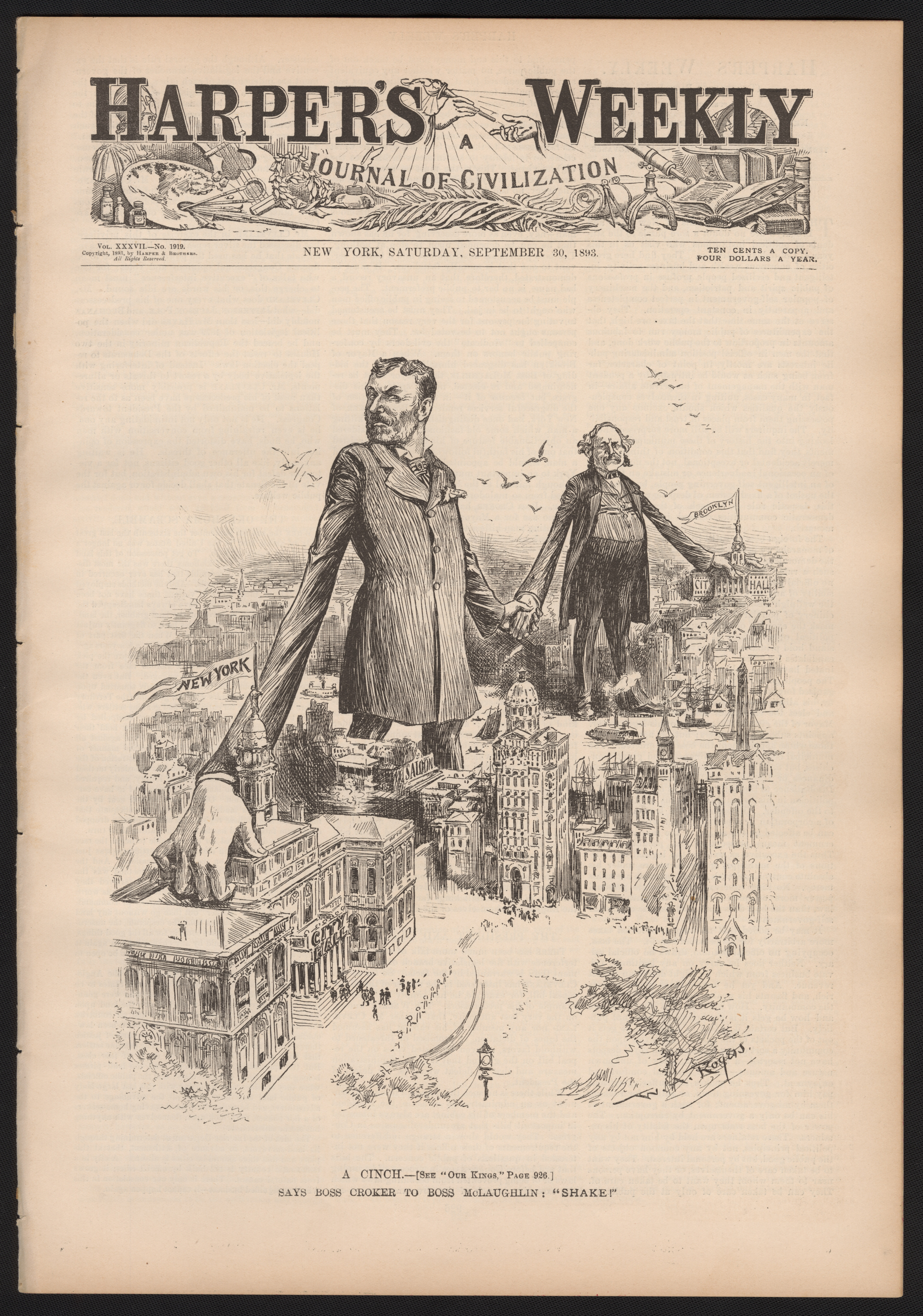
A Cinch. Says Boss Croker to Boss McLaughlin: "Shake!" (Harper's Magazine, 1893)

After the death of John Kelly, Croker became the leader of Tammany Hall and for some time almost completely controlled that organization. As head of Tammany, Croker received bribe money from the owners of brothels, saloons and illegal gambling dens. Croker was chairman of Tammany's Finance Committee but received no salary for his position. Croker also became a partner in the real estate firm Meyer and Croker with Peter F. Meyer, from which he made substantial money. The money was often derived from sales under the control of the city through city judges. Other income came by way of gifts of stock from street railway and transit companies, for example. The city police were largely still under the control of Tammany Hall, and payoffs from vice protection operations also contributed to Tammany income. Croker survived Charles Henry Parkhurst's attacks on Tammany Hall's corruption and became a wealthy man. Several committees were established in the 1890s, largely at the behest of Thomas C. Platt and other Republicans, to investigate Tammany and Croker, including the 1890 Fassett Committee, the 1894 Lexow Committee, during which Croker left the United States for his European residences for three years, and the Mazet Investigation of 1899.

Croker's greatest political success was his bringing about the 1897 election of Robert A. Van Wyck as first mayor of the five-borough "greater" New York, and during Van Wyck's administration Croker is popularly supposed to have completely dominated the government of the city.

Croker was in the newspapers in 1899 after a disagreement with Jay Gould's son, George Gould, president of the Manhattan Elevated Railroad Company, when Gould refused Croker's attempt to attach compressed-air pipes to the Elevated company's structures. Croker owned many shares of the New York Auto-Truck Company, which would have benefited from the arrangement. In response to the refusal, Croker used Tammany influence to create new city laws requiring drip pans under structures in Manhattan at every street crossing and the requirement that the railroad run trains every five minutes with a $100 violation for every instance. Croker also held 2,500 shares of the American Ice Company, worth approximately $250,000, which came under scrutiny in 1900 when the company attempted to raise the price of ice in the city.

After Croker's failure to carry the city in the 1900 presidential election and the defeat of his mayoralty candidate, Edward M. Shepard in 1901, he resigned from his position of leadership in Tammany and was succeeded by Lewis Nixon. Croker departed the United States in 1905. An associate described Croker as having "[a] strong frame, a deep chest, a short neck and a pair of hard fists.... He speaks in monosyllables, [and] commands a vocabulary that appears to be limited to about three hundred words...."

== Thoroughbred racing ==
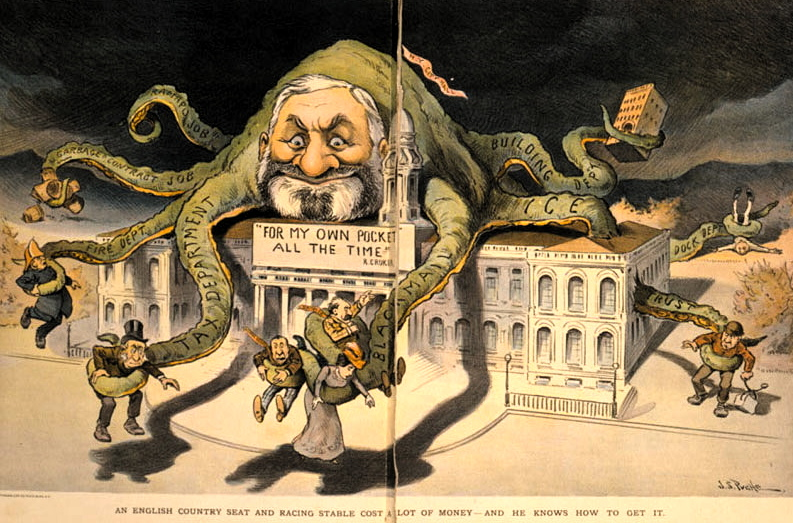
Boss Croker as an Octopus

Croker operated a stable of thoroughbred racehorses in the United States in partnership with Mike Dwyer. In January 1895, they sent a stable of horses to England under the care of trainer Hardy Campbell Jr. and jockey Willie Simms. Following a dispute, the partnership was dissolved in May, but Croker continued to race in England.

In 1907, his horse Orby won Britain's most prestigious race, The Derby. Orby was ridden by American jockey John Reiff, whose brother Lester had won the race in 1901. Croker was also the breeder of Orby's son Grand Parade, who won the Derby in 1919.

== Death ==
Croker returned to Ireland in 1905 and bought an estate in Malahide, county Dublin where he bred horses. He died on April 29, 1922, at Glencairn House, his home in Stillorgan outside Dublin. His funeral, celebrated by South African bishop William Miller, drew some of Dublin's most eminent citizens; the pallbearers were Arthur Griffith, the President of Dáil Éireann; Laurence O'Neill, the Lord Mayor of Dublin; Oliver St. John Gogarty; Joseph MacDonagh; A.H. Flauley, of Chicago; and J.E. Tierney. Michael Collins, Chairman of the Provisional Government, was represented by Kevin O'Shiel; the Lord Lieutenant, Viscount FitzAlan, was represented by his under-secretary, James MacMahon.

In 1927, J. J. Walsh claimed that, just before his death, Croker had accepted the Provisional Government's invitation to stand in Dublin County in the imminent Irish election.

== Family ==
Croker married twice; first, in 1873, to Elizabeth Fraser. They had several children.

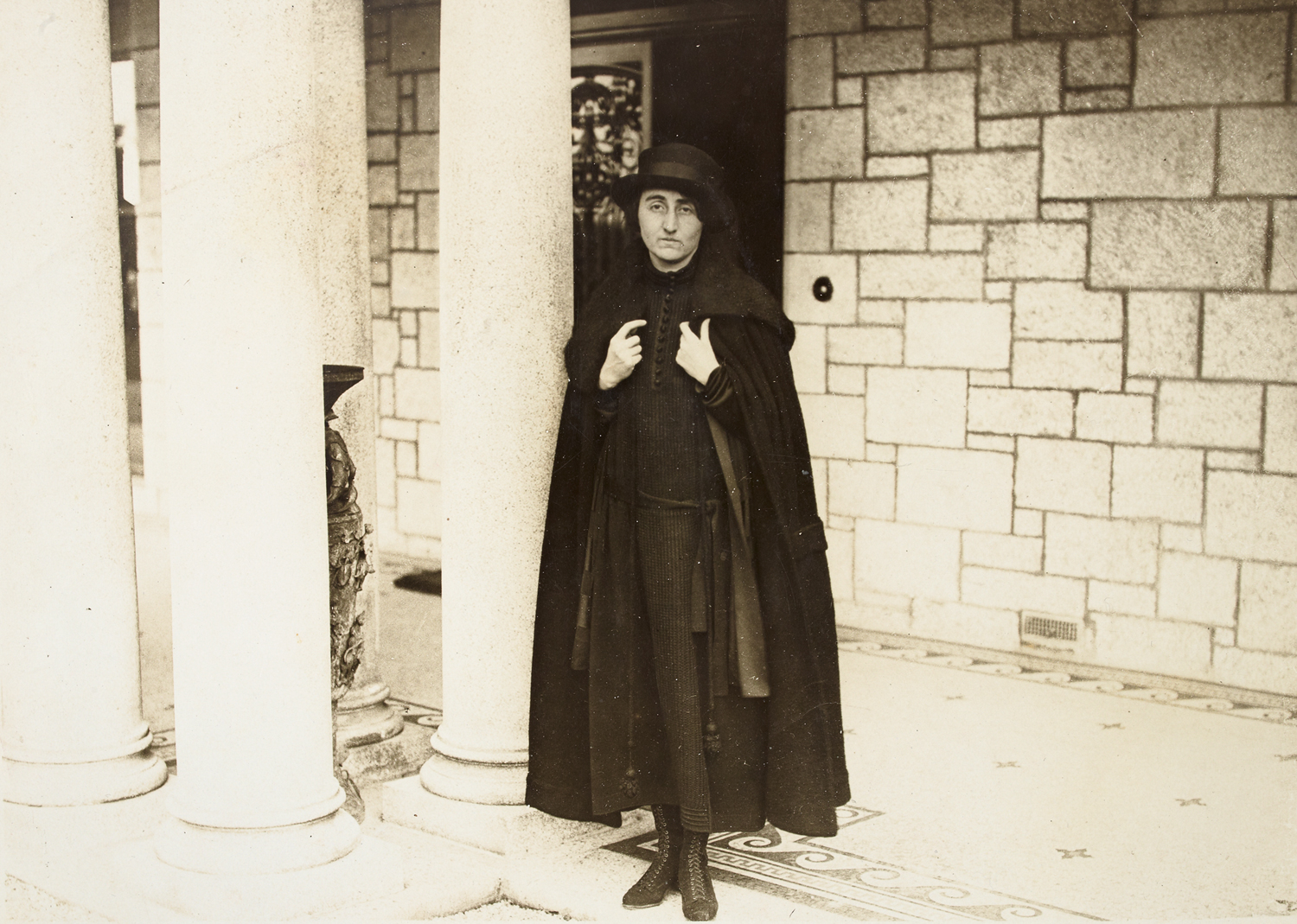
Beulah Croker, outside Glencairn House, their house in Stillorgan, c. 1921 or 1922

He married Bula Benson Edmondson in November 1914 when he was 71 years old. She was of American Indian descent, her tribal name being Ketaw Kaluntuchy.

=== Disputed will ===
Croker left an estate estimated to $3–5 million to his second wife, Beulah, disinheriting his estranged children. He had converted to Catholicism shortly before his death but this does not appear to have played a role in his disinheriting his children. A note in his handwriting, dated at Glencairn, November 15, 1919 read as follows:

My dear Bula: I am writing this note for you to keep and in case you should survive me I wish you would give my daughter Florence ten thousand pounds. She is the only one of my surviving children who has ever shown any graditude [sic] to me. (Signed) Richard Croker.

Croker's other surviving children, Richard, Ethel, and Howard, unsuccessfully challenged the will in a celebrated probate lawsuit in the Court of King's Bench in Ireland. They claimed that their father in 1919 was of unsound mind and unduly influenced by his wife, and that the 1914 marriage was void as she was already married to one Guy R. Marone. A jury rejected all these allegations. The widow and children had related lawsuits in the United States.

Party political offices
Preceded by John Kelly	Tammany Hall; 1886–1902	Succeeded by Lewis Nixon
