= William Jay (colonel) =

American lawyer and Civil War officer (1841–1915)

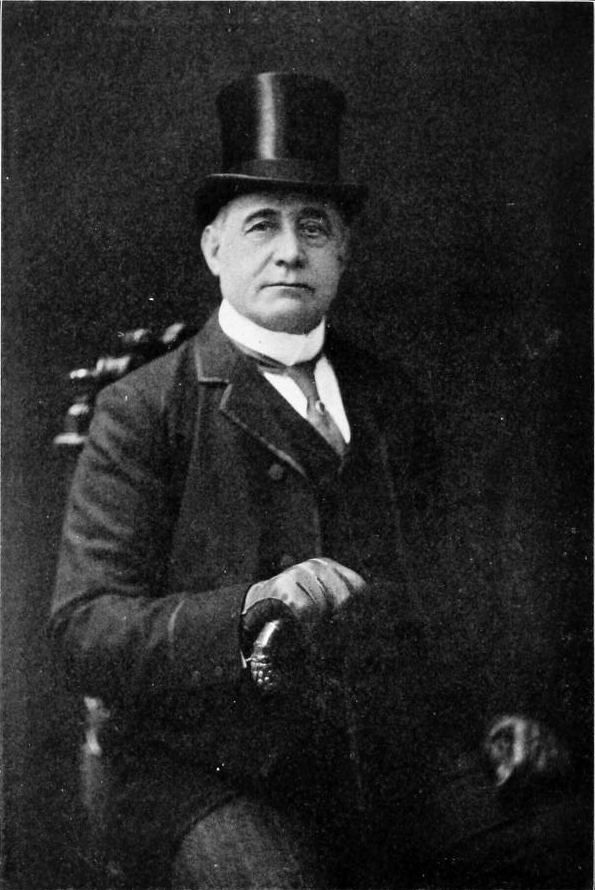

40th President of the Saint Nicholas Society of the City of New York
- In office 1908–1909
- Preceded by: Austen George Fox
- Succeeded by: Charles Augustus Schermerhorn

Personal details
- Born: February 12, 1841 Manhattan, New York, U.S.
- Died: March 28, 1915 (aged 74) White Sulfur Springs, West Virginia, U.S.
- Spouse: Lucie Oelrichs (m. 1878)
- Relations: William Jay (grandfather)
- Children: 3
- Parent(s): John Jay; Eleanor Kingsland Field Jay
- Education: Columbia College; Columbia Law School

William Jay (February 12, 1841 – March 28, 1915) was an American soldier and a lawyer. He served in the Union Army as a lieutenant colonel during the American Civil War. He served as the 40th President of the Saint Nicholas Society of the City of New York.

== Early life ==
Jay was born on February 12, 1841. He was the only son born to John Jay (1817–1894), a lawyer and diplomat, and Eleanor Kingsland (née Field) Jay (1819–1909). He was the brother of Eleanor (née Jay) Chapman, wife of Henry Grafton Chapman Jr. (the president of the New York Stock Exchange, son of abolitionist Maria Weston Chapman, and father of John Jay Chapman); John S. Jay, who died young; Augusta (née Jay) Robinson, wife of Edmund Randolph Robinson (son of prominent civil engineer Moncure Robinson); and Mary (née Jay) Schieffelin, wife of William Henry Schieffelin (son of author Samuel Schieffelin).

His paternal grandparents were Judge William Jay and Augusta (née McVickar) Jay. He was the great-grandson of Founding Father John Jay, the 1st Chief Justice of the United States. His maternal grandparents were Eleanor and Hickson Woolman Field (uncle to Benjamin Hazard Field). His grandfather was a prominent merchant in New York City.

Jay entered Columbia College, graduating in 1859.

== Career ==
Jay, who reportedly inherited his father's anti-slavery views, entered the United States Army at the beginning of the U.S. Civil War and served throughout the conflict, earning the rank of brevet Lieutenant Colonel and serving on the staff of General George Meade, Commander of the Army of the Potomac. Jay fought in the Battles of Gettysburg, Mine Run, Chancellorsville, and Appomattox.

After the War ended, Jay returned to Columbia where he entered the law school, graduating in 1868. Upon passing the bar exam, he entered into a partnership with Flamen B. Chandler known as Jay & Chandler and located at 48 Wall Street. Chandler was formerly the partner of Edgar S. Van Winkle, who in turn had been partners with Daniel Webster. Jay focused his extensive practice on important trusts and estates as well as railroad an industrial matters. He was also attorney for James Gordon Bennett Jr., publisher of the New York Herald.

Jay also served as the vice president of the New York Herald, president of the New York Cab Company and the Valley Farms Company. He was a director of the Commercial Cable Company and the New York Mortgage and Security Company.

=== Society and sporting interests ===
A noted horseman, he was the first president and one of the founders (along with his friend DeLancey Astor Kane) of The Coaching Club in 1876, the pioneer coaching club, serving until 1896. He was also one of the earliest members of the Westminster Polo Club and serving as president of the Meadow Brook Hunt Club in Long Island.

He was a member of the City Club, the Century Club, the Knickerbocker Club, the Sons of the Revolution, the New-York Historical Society, the American Geographical Society, the Metropolitan Museum of Art, the Society of the Army of the Potomac, and former president of The Huguenot Society of America. Jay also served as the 40th President of the Saint Nicholas Society of the City of New York.

== Personal life ==
In June 1878, Jay was married to Lucie Oelrichs (1854–1931). Lucie was the daughter of Henry Ferdinand Oelrichs, a leading New York merchant, and Julia Matilda (née May) Oelrichs, and the sister of Hermann Oelrichs and Charles May Oelrichs. Together, they resided at 22 East 72nd Street and the old family estate, known as Bedford House in Katonah, New York. William and Lucie were the parents of:

- Julia Jay (1879–1896), a twin who died aged 17.
- Eleanor Jay (1882–1953), who married Arthur Iselin (1878–1952), grandson of Adrian Georg Iselin, in 1904.
- Dorothy Jay (1887–1889), who died in infancy of diphtheria.

Jay died of heart disease on March 28, 1915, at the Greenbrier Hotel in White Sulfur Springs, West Virginia. After a funeral at Trinity Church, Jay was buried in the Jay Family vault at Saint Matthew's Episcopal Churchyard in Bedford, New York. His estate was valued between $2,000,000 and $10,000,000 at his death.

=== Descendants ===
Through his daughter Eleanor, he was the grandfather of Dorothy Iselin Paschal (1905–1981), the wife of Guy Sherman Paschal; and William Jay Iselin (1908–1951), the father of John Jay Iselin; Arthur Iselin Jr.; and Eleanor Iselin, who married Thomas Frothingham Mason (grand-nephew of Edward Sandford Martin, founder of Life magazine) in 1932.
