= William Dennistoun Murphy =

American historian

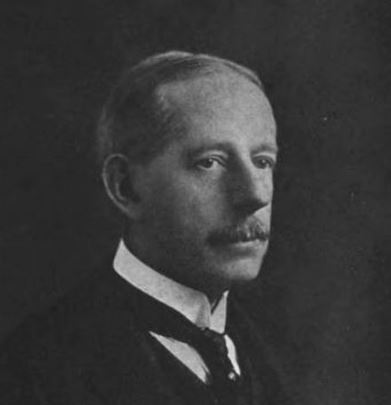

47th president of the Saint Nicholas Society of the City of New York
- In office 1918–1919
- Preceded by: De Lancey Nicoll
- Succeeded by: Alfred Wagstaff Jr.

Personal details
- Born: January 4, 1859; New York City, New York, U.S.
- Died: August 23, 1938 (aged 79); Nyack, New York, U.S.
- Spouse: Rosalie Hart (m. 1883)
- Education: Columbia Grammar School

William Dennistoun Murphy Jr. (January 4, 1859 – August 23, 1935) was an American real estate manager.

== Early life ==
Murphy was born on January 4, 1859, in New York City. He was the son of William Dennistoun Murphy (1796–1877) and Ann Letitia (née Goodlieff) Murphy (1813–1885). His older sister was Elizabeth Anzolette "Lizzie" Murphy, the wife of Eugene Hiram Paddock.

His paternal grandparents were John S. Murphy and Lydia (née Cornish) Murphy.

He was educated by Anthon at Columbia Grammar School before attending Dolbear's Commercial College.

== Career ==
Constituent member of the Real Estate Exchange and Auction Room served as chairman of the committee on Taxation. He worked as an independent operator, executor, and manager of several estates.

Murphy was actively interested in Republican politics one of the earliest supporters of Theodore Roosevelt, and was a prominent campaign speaker who served on local and state conventions.

He was a member of the New York Chamber of Commerce, the American Institute of Royal Photographic Society of Great Britain, the Baptist Social Union (of which he served as president), the Society of Colonial Wars, the Navy League of the United States, and was an honorary member of the 11th Army Corps Association.

On January 16, 1888, he was elected a member of the Saint Nicholas Society of the City of New York, an organization in New York City of men descended from early inhabitants of the State of New York. Beginning in 1918, he served two terms as the Society's 47th President, succeeding former New York County District Attorney De Lancey Nicoll.

== Personal life ==
In January 1883, Murphy was married to Rosalie Hart (1858–1947) in Philadelphia. Together, they William and Rosalie lived at 40 East 49th Street and were the parents of two children, only one of whom survived to adulthood:

- Rosalie Louise Murphy (1883–1885), who died in infancy.
- William Deacon Murphy (b. 1887), who attended Columbia Law School and became a lawyer.

Murphy traveled extensively throughout America and Europe and was known for his after dinner speaking as well as his lectures on art and photographic topics. He was a member of the New-York Historical Society, The Union League Club, and was an amateur photographer, being a member of the Camera Club (serving as president of the Club for five years), which was created by wealthy gentlemen photography enthusiasts who sought refuge from the mass popularization of the medium in the 1880s.

Murphy died on August 23, 1935, at Nyack, New York. After a service at the Church of Heavenly Rest in Manhattan, he was buried at Green-Wood Cemetery in Brooklyn.
