= List of presidents of the Saint Nicholas Society of the City of New York =

The Saint Nicholas Society of the City of New York, founded in 1835, is a charitable organization of men who are descended from early inhabitants of the State of New York.

== Governance ==
The Society is led by a President, four Vice Presidents, Secretary, Treasurer, Historian, Genealogist, Assistant Genealogist, Chaplains, and Physicians.

== List of presidents ==
Portrait	No.	Name	Start date	End date	Comments
	1	Peter Gerard Stuyvesant	1835	1836	
	2	Gulian Crommelin Verplanck	1837	1841	
	3	Egbert Benson	1842	1843	
	4	James R. Manley	1844	1845	
	5	Samuel Jones	1846	1847	
	6	John Alsop King	1848	1849	
	7	James de Peyster Ogden	1850	1851	
	8	Ogden Hoffman	1852	1853	
	9	Frederic De Peyster	1854	1855	
	10	James de Peyster Ogden	1856	1857	
	11	Hamilton Fish	1860	1861	
	12	James Jacobus Roosevelt	1862	1862	
	13	John Van Buren	1863	1863	
	14	James Jacobus Roosevelt	1864	1864	
	15	Augustus Schell	1865	1866	
	16	Charles Roome	1867	1867	
	17	James William Beekman	1868	1869	
	18	Benjamin Hazard Field	1870	1870	
	19	Richard Edwards Mount Jr.	1871	1872	
	20	James Monroe McLean	1873	1874	
	21	Augustus Rodney Macdonough	1875	1876	
	22	William Montgomery Vermilye	1877	1878	
	23	Robert George Remsen	1879	1879	
	24	Edward Floyd DeLancey	1880	1881	
	25	Abraham Riker Lawrence	1882	1883	
	26	Nathaniel Platt Bailey	1884	1884	
	27	Cornelius Vanderbilt II	1885	1886	
	28	Carlisle Norwood Jr.	1887	1887	
	29	John Cruger Mills	1888	1888	
	30	Edward Schell	1889	1889	
	31	James William Beekman Jr.	1890	1891	
	32	Frederic James de Peyster	1892	1893	
	33	Chauncey Mitchell Depew	1894	1895	
	34	Edward King	1896	1897	
	35	Stiles Franklin Stanton	1898	1899	
	36	Frederic de Peyster Foster	1900	1901	
	37	Stuyvesant Fish	1902	1903	
	38	George Gosman DeWitt	1904	1905	
	39	Austen George Fox	1906	1907	
	40	William Jay	1908	1909	
	41	Charles Augustus Schermerhorn	1910	1911	
	42	John Thomas Lockman	1912	1912	
	43	Walter Lispenard Suydam	1913	1913	
	44	Charles Bradford Isham	1914	1914	
	45	Vernon Mansfield Davis	1915	1915	
	46	De Lancey Nicoll	1916	1917	
	47	William Dennistoun Murphy	1918	1919	
	48	Alfred Wagstaff Jr.	1920	1921	
	49	Howard Duffield	1922	1923	
