= Endorsements in the 1920 Republican Party presidential primaries =

This is a list of endorsements for declared candidates in the Republican primaries for the 1920 United States presidential election.

== Warren Harding ==
List of Warren Harding endorsements

U.S. executive branch officials

Current

U.S. senators

Current
Former

U.S. representatives

Current

- Nicholas Longworth, U.S. Representative from OH-1 (1915-1931)
- Ambrose Stephens, U.S. Representative from OH-2 (1919-1927)
- Charles Thompson, U.S. Representative from OH-5 (1919-1931)
- Charles Kearns, U.S. Representative from OH-6 (1915-1931)
- Simeon Fess, U.S. Representative from OH-7 (1913-1923)
- R. Clint Cole, U.S. Representative from OH-8 (1919-1925)
- Israel Foster, U.S. Representative from OH-10 (1919-1925)
- Edwin Ricketts, U.S. Representative from OH-11 (1919-1923)
- James Begg, U.S. Representative from OH-13 (1919-1929)
- C. Ellis Moore, U.S. Representative from OH-15 (1919-1933)
- Roscoe McCulloch, U.S. Representative from OH-16 (1915-1921)
- B. Frank Murphy, U.S. Representative from OH-18 (1919-1933)
- John Cooper, U.S. Representative from OH-19 (1915-1937)
- Henry Emerson, U.S. Representative from OH-22 (1915-1921)

Former

- Beman Dawes, U.S. Representative from OH-15 (1905-1909)

Governors

Current
Former

- Frank Willis, Governor of Ohio (1915-1917)

Statewide officials

State legislators

Local officials

Party officials

Individuals

- Harry Daugherty, politician
- Thomas Edison, inventor
- Douglas Fairbanks, actor
- Henry Ford, industrialist
- Lillian Gish, actress
- Al Jolson, singer
- Mary Pickford, actress
- Lillian Russell, actress
- Pearl White, actress

Organizations

Newspapers

== Leonard Wood ==
List of Leonard Wood endorsements

U.S. executive branch officials

- Franklin MacVeagh, U.S. Secretary of the Treasury (1909–1913)
- Herbert Satterlee, U.S. Assistant Secretary of the Navy (1908–1909)
- John Griggs, U.S. Attorney General (1898–1901)
- Charles Bonaparte, U.S. Attorney General (1906–1909)
- Henry Stimson, U.S. Secretary of War (1911-1913)
- James Garfield, U.S. Secretary of the Interior (1907-1909)
- Frank Hitchcock, U.S. Postmaster General (1909-1913)

U.S. senators

Current

- George Moses, U.S. Senator from New Hampshire (1918-1933)

Former

- Elihu Root, U.S. Senator from New York (1909-1915)

U.S. representatives

Current

- Willfred Lufkin, U.S. Representative from MA-6 (1917-1921)
- Norman Gould, U.S. Representative from NY-36 (1915-1923)

Former

- Thomas Miller, U.S. Representative from DE-AL (1915-1917)
- Frank Guernsey, U.S. Representative from ME-4 (1908-1917)

Governors

Current

- Oliver Shoup, Governor of Colorado (1919-1923)
- Henry Allen, Governor of Kansas (1919-1923)
- Carl Milliken, Governor of Maine (1917-1921)
- Joseph Burnquist, Governor of Minnesota (1915-1921)
- John Bartlett, Governor of New Hampshire (1919-1921)
- Peter Norbeck, Governor of South Dakota (1917-1921)

Former

- Walter Stubbs, Governor of Kansas (1909-1913)
- William Cobb, Governor of Maine (1905-1909)
- Edward Stokes, Governor of New Jersey (1905-1908)
- William Runyon, Governor of New Jersey (1919-1920)
- George Curry, Governor of New Mexico (1907-1910)
- Horace White, Governor of New York (1910)

Statewide officials

- William Read, Treasurer of New Jersey (1916-1928)
- William Loeb Jr., Collector of the Port of New York (1909-1913)
- Fred M. Ackereson, Judge of the New York Court of Claims

State legislators

Current

- Arthur McKinley, Indiana State Senator
- A. H. Beardsley, Indiana State Senator
- Claude A. Smith, Indiana State Representative

Former

- Austen Colgate, New Jersey State Senator
- William Llewellyn, New Mexico State Representative (1912)

Local officials

- Charles A. Bookwalter, Mayor of Indianapolis, Indiana (1906-1910)
- William F. Hodges, Mayor of Gary, Indiana (1906-1910)

Party officials

- Allen B. Jaynes, Republican National Committeeman from Arizona
- John T. King, Republican National Committeeman from Connecticut
- Fred M. Stanley, Republican National Committeeman from Kansas
- Fred W. Estabrook, Republican National Committeeman from New Hampshire
- James J. McGraw, Republican National Committeeman from Oklahoma
- William Flinn, Republican State Committeeman from Pennsylvania (1912) (Progressive)

Individuals

- William Procter, Head of Procter & Gamble (1907-1930)
- George Fearon, lawyer
- Fred Hammond, lawyer
- Ferdinand Peck, businessman and philanthropist
- Frederic René Coudert Jr., soldier (Democratic)
- Charles Schwab, steel magnate
- Frank Knox, newspaper editor and publisher
- Billy Sunday, evangelist
- Theodore Roosevelt Jr., businessman and soldier
- Irving Putnam, book publisher
- Alice Hall Chittenden, anti-suffragist
- Julian Street, author
- Albert Bushnell Hart, historian, writer, and editor
- Irving Kirkwood, editor of The Kansas City Star
- Guy Murchie Sr., lawyer and soldier
- Howard Duffield, minister
- Daniel Willard, railroad executive
- William Henderson, musical critic and scholar
- Robert Chambers, artist and fiction writer
- Booth Tarkington, novelist and dramatist
- Dr. Alexander Lambert, physician
- Walter Camp, American football player, coach, and sports writer
- Burr McIntosh, lecturer, photographer, film studio owner, silent film actor, author, publisher
- Robert Bacon, banker and military officer
- Harriet Vittum, social reformer
- Elbert Gary, lawyer, county judge and business executive
- Charles Schwab, steel magnate

Organizations

Newspapers

- Chicago Unionist
- Buffalo Journal
- Labor News

== Frank Lowden ==
List of Frank Lowden endorsements

U.S. executive branch officials

Current

U.S. senators

Current

- Medill McCormick, U.S. Senator from Illinois (1919-1925)
- Lawrence Sherman, U.S. Senator from Illinois (1913-1921)

Former

U.S. representatives

Current

- William Mason, U.S. Representative from IL-AL Seat A (1917-1921)
- Richard Yates Jr., U.S. Representative from IL-AL Seat B (1919-1933)
- Martin Madden, U.S. Representative from IL-1 (1905-1928)
- James Robert Mann, U.S. Representative from IL-2 (1897-1922)
- William Wilson, U.S. Representative from IL-3 (1915-1921)
- Niels Juul, U.S. Representative from IL-7 (1917-1921)
- Frederick Britten, U.S. Representative from IL-9 (1913-1935)
- Carl Chindblom, U.S. Representative from IL-10 (1919-1933)
- Ira Copley, U.S. Representative from IL-11 (1911-1923)
- Charles Fuller, U.S. Representative from IL-12 (1915-1926)
- John McKenzie, U.S. Representative from IL-13 (1911-1925)
- William Graham, U.S. Representative from IL-14 (1917-1924)
- Edward John King, U.S. Representative from IL-15 (1915-1929)
- Clifford Ireland, U.S. Representative from IL-16 (1917-1923)
- Frank Smith, U.S. Representative from IL-17 (1919-1921)
- Joseph Gurney Cannon, U.S. Representative from IL-18 (1915-1923)
- William McKinley, U.S. Representative from IL-19 (1915-1921)
- Loren Wheeler, U.S. Representative from IL-21 (1915-1923)
- William Rodenberg, U.S. Representative from IL-22 (1915-1923)
- Edwin Brooks, U.S. Representative from IL-23 (1919-1923)
- Thomas Williams, U.S. Representative from IL-24 (1915-1929)
- Edward Denison, U.S. Representative from IL-25 (1915-1931)

Former

Governors

Current
Former

Statewide officials

- Louis Emmerson, Illinois Secretary of State (1917-1929)
- Fred Sterling, Illinois State Treasurer (1919-1921)

State legislators

Local officials

Party officials

Individuals

- Roy West, lawyer

Organizations

Newspapers

== Hiram Johnson ==
List of Hiram Johnson endorsements

U.S. executive branch officials

Current

U.S. senators

Current

- William Borah, U.S. Senator from Idaho (1907-1940)
- William Kenyon, U.S. Senator from Iowa (1911-1922)
- George Norris, U.S. Senator from Nebraska (1913-1943)
- Charles McNary, U.S. Senator from Oregon (1918-1944)

Former

U.S. representatives

Current

- Louis Cramton, U.S. Representative from MI-7 (1913-1931)
- Thomas Schall, U.S. Representative from MN-10 (1915-1925)

Former

Governors

Current
Former

- Frank Byrne, Governor of South Dakota (1913-1917)

Statewide officials

- William Bennett, New York State Senator (1915-1916)
- George Thompson, New York State Senator (1913-1920)

State legislators

Local officials

Party officials

Individuals

- Angus McSween, correspondent for The North American
- Herbert Fleishhacker, businessman, civic leader and philanthropist
- John Neylan, lawyer and journalist
- Samuel Shortridge, politician
- Chester Rowell, editor of the Fresno Morning Republican

Organizations

Newspapers

== William Sproul ==
List of William Sproul endorsements

U.S. executive branch officials

Current
Former

U.S. senators

Current
Former

U.S. representatives

Current
Former

Governors

Current
Former

Statewide officials

State legislators

Current

- Edwin T. Vare, Pennsylvania State Senator

Former

Local officials

Party officials
Individuals

Organizations

Newspapers

== Nicholas Butler ==
List of Nicholas Butler endorsements

U.S. executive branch officials

Current

U.S. senators

Current
Former

U.S. representatives

Current
Former

Governors

Current
Former

Statewide officials

- Frederick Gilkyson, Adjutants General of the New Jersey Army National Guard

State legislators

- Edwin T. Coman, Washington State Senator (1918-1922)

Local officials

- John R. Davies, Justice of the New York City Municipal Court

Party officials

Individuals

Organizations

Newspapers

== Miles Poindexter ==
List of Miles Poindexter endorsements

U.S. executive branch officials

Current

U.S. senators

Current
Former

U.S. representatives

Current
Former

- James Bryan, U.S. Representative from WA-AL Seat A (1913-1915)

Governors

Current
Former

Statewide officials

State legislators

Local officials

Party officials

Individuals

Organizations

Newspapers

== Herbert Hoover ==
List of Herbert Hoover endorsements

U.S. executive branch officials

Current

U.S. senators

Current
Former

U.S. representatives

Current
Former

Governors

Current
Former

Statewide officials

State legislators

Current
Former

Local officials

Party officials

- William Flinn, Republican State Committeeman from Pennsylvania (1912) (Progressive)

Individuals

- Julius Barnes, industrialist and government official
- Edgar Rickard, mining engineer
- Frank Goodnow, President of Johns Hopkins University
- Mark Requa, mining engineer and petroleum conservationist

Organizations

Newspapers
