= John Cruger Mills =

American author and doctor (1829–1889)

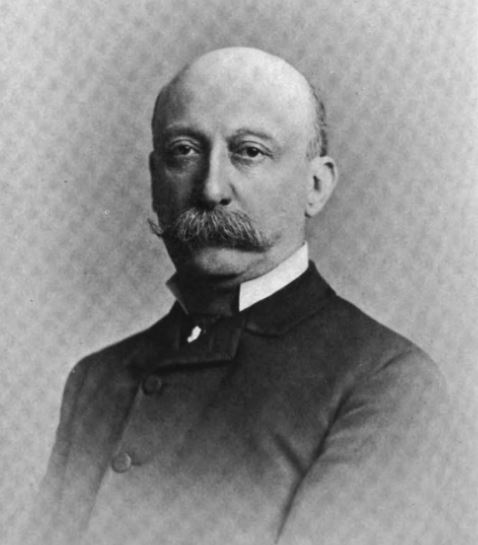

29th President of the Saint Nicholas Society of the City of New York
- In office 1888–1888
- Preceded by: Carlisle Norwood Jr.
- Succeeded by: Edward Schell

Personal details
- Born: July 31, 1829 New York City, U.S.
- Died: August 4, 1889 (aged 60) Saratoga Springs, New York, U.S.
- Spouse: Harriet Bininger Sands

John Cruger Mills (July 31, 1829 – August 4, 1889) was an American author and director.

== Early life ==
Mills was born on July 31, 1829, in New York City. He was the son of Mary (née Cruger) Mills (b. 1806) and Sylvester H. Mills (d. 1851).

His maternal grandparents were Martha (née Ramsay) Cruger and John Cruger, a direct descendant of Henry Cruger (who was elected to both the Parliament of Great Britain and the New York State Senate), and John Cruger (the 38th mayor of New York City) and his wife, Maria (née Cuyler) Cruger (a sister of Johannes Cuyler).

== Career ==
In 1854, he edited The Shaksperean Oracle. Mills was a member of Tammany Hall and served as a director of Citizens' Savings Bank.

On November 28, 1864, he was elected a member of the Saint Nicholas Society of the City of New York, a charitable organization in New York City of men who are descended from early inhabitants of the State of New York. In 1888, he succeeded Carlisle Norwood Jr. to become the 29th president of the society. He was also a member of the Union Club and the Downtown Club.

== Personal life ==
Mills was married to Harriet Bininger Sands (1827–1898), the daughter of Nathaniel Sands.

Mills died of brain trouble on August 4, 1889, in Saratoga Springs, New York. He was buried at Woodlawn Cemetery in the Bronx. After a short illness, his widow died on December 20, 1898, at her residence, 45 Fifth Avenue.
