= Augustus R. Macdonough =

American lawyer, editor and railroad executive

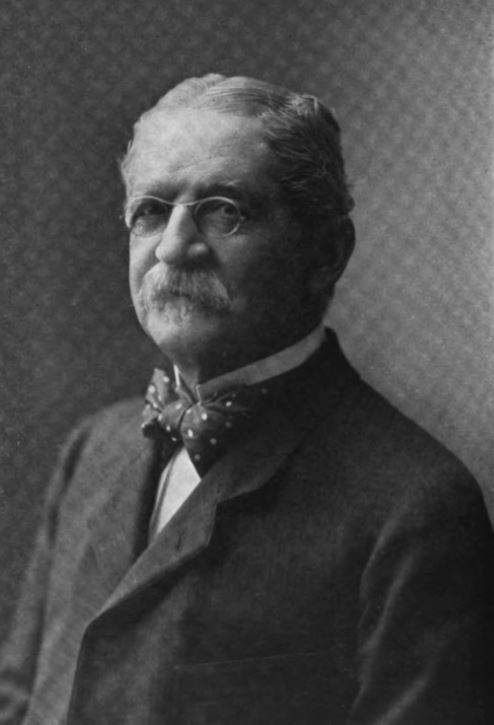

21st President of the Saint Nicholas Society of the City of New York
- In office 1875–1876
- Preceded by: James Monroe McLean
- Succeeded by: William Montgomery Vermilye

Personal details
- Born: Augustus Rodney Macdonough; November 20, 1820 Middletown, Connecticut, U.S.
- Died: July 21, 1907 (aged 86) New York City, New York, U.S.
- Spouse: Frances Brenton McVickar (m. 1846; died 1846)
- Parent(s): Thomas Macdonough; Lucy Anne Shaler Macdonough
- Education: Yale University; Harvard Law School
- Known for: Secretary of the Erie Railroad

Augustus Rodney Macdonough (November 20, 1820 – July 21, 1907) was an American lawyer, newspaper editor, and Secretary of the Erie Railroad for twenty-five years.

== Early life ==
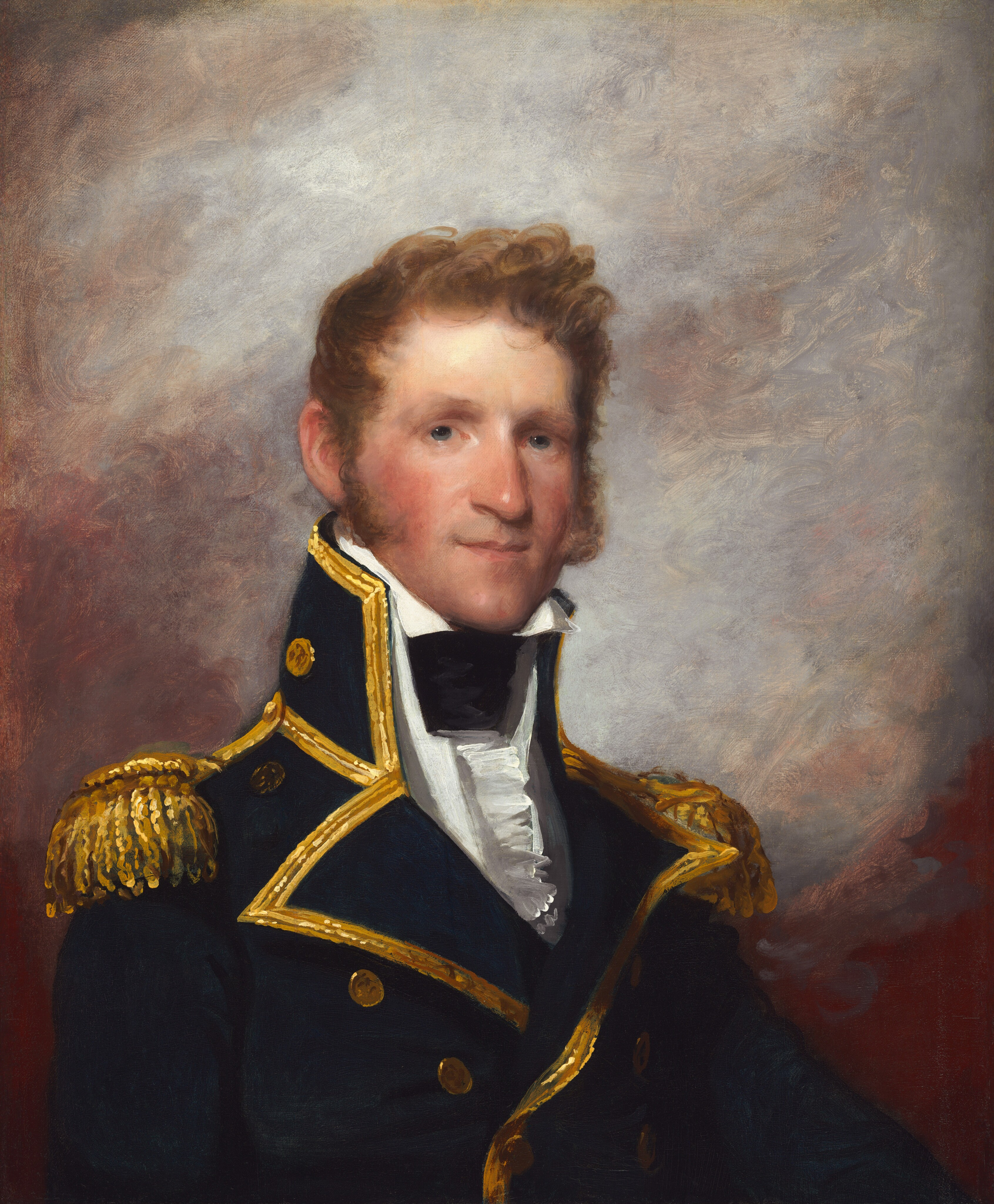
Portrait of his father, Commander Thomas Macdonough, by Gilbert Stuart.

Macdonough was born on November 20, 1820, at Middletown in Middlesex County, Connecticut, and was named after his father's friend, Caesar Augustus Rodney. (Note: Caesar Augustus Rodney was a lawyer from Wilmington who was a U.S. Representative, U.S. Senator, U.S. Attorney General, and U.S. Minister to Argentina.) He was the seventh of ten children born to Commander Thomas Macdonough (1783–1825) and Lucy Anne (née Shaler) Macdonough, who were wed on December 12, 1812. His father was known for his role in the Barbary War and the War of 1812 where he was commanded the United States Navy, and was hailed as the hero of the Battle of Lake Champlain. Among his siblings was Thomas, who died young; Dr. James E. F., who died unmarried; Mary, who died young; Charles Shaler and William, twins; Thomas; Frances, who died young; and Charlotte.

His paternal grandfather was Thomas Macdonough Sr., a Revolutionary War officer who lived near Middletown, Delaware. Her maternal grandparents were Nathaniel Mould Shaler and Lucretia Ann (née Denning) Shaler (herself the daughter of U.S. Representative William Denning and sister-in-law of William Alexander Duer).

Macdonough was educated in Utica, New York, before attending Yale University, where he graduated in 1839. He was a student of law at Harvard Law School in 1842.

== Career ==
After being admitted to the bar, he practiced law in St. Louis, Missouri, from 1842 to 1848. Shortly before his wife died, they moved to New York City where he continued to practice law until 1873. MacDonough was recording secretary of the New York City Bar Association from 1870 to 1874. After leaving the bar, he served on the board of the New York, Lake Erie and Western Railroad Company for twenty-five years including as Secretary after its reorganization under president Hugh J. Jewett and serving until 1896.

Beginning with his election at the age of thirty-one on November 6, 1852, Macdonough was a member of the Century Association in New York for fifty-five years. In 1875, he became the 22nd President of the Saint Nicholas Society of the City of New York, a charitable organization in New York City of men who are descended from early inhabitants of the State of New York.

== Personal life ==
On June 10, 1846, Macdonough was married to Frances Brenton McVickar, who died less than seven months later on December 6, 1846.

Macdonough was also interested in literature and was considered a "master of classical and modern languages." He was also an accomplished author and poet, who wrote, A Magdalen of the Dresden Gallery, and edited a daily newspaper titled The Spirit of the Fair, which ran from April 5, 1864, to April 23, 1864.

By 1853, he owned the painting of his father by Gilbert Stuart (c. 1815 – c. 1818), from his brother Charles Shaler MacDonough, which he lent it to the Washington Exhibition in New York. After his death, Augustus bequeathed the painting to his nephew, Rodney MacDonough, who left it to his children and was eventually owned by Andrew W. Mellon and is today part of the National Gallery of Art in Washington, D.C.

Macdonough died on July 21, 1907, at his home, 353 West 57th Street in New York City. After a funeral at the Indian Hill Chapel conducted by Rev. H. B. Vanderbogart of the Berkeley Divinity School, he was buried at Indian Hill Cemetery in Middletown.
