= Egbert Benson (New York politician) =

American landowner (1789–1866)

3rd President of the Saint Nicholas Society of the City of New York
- In office 1842–1844
- Preceded by: Gulian Crommelin Verplanck
- Succeeded by: James R. Manley

Personal details
- Born: September 1, 1789 Brooklyn, New York, U.S.
- Died: February 25, 1866 (aged 76) New York, New York, U.S.
- Spouse: Maria Cowenhoven (m. 1820–1866)
- Relations: Egbert Benson (uncle); Leffert Lefferts (brother-in-law)
- Parent(s): Robert Benson; Dinah Couwenhoven Benson
- Education: Columbia College

Egbert Benson (September 1, 1789 – February 25, 1866) was an American politician and prominent landowner in Brooklyn.

== Early life ==
Benson was born in New York on September 1, 1789. He was the son of Dinah (née Couwenhoven) Benson and Lieutenant Colonel Robert Benson (1739–1823), Clerk of the New York State Senate. His siblings included Robert Benson; Maria Benson, the wife of Leffert Lefferts; Jane Benson, the wife of Dr. Richard Kissam Hoffman.

His uncle, and namesake, was one of the Founding Fathers of the United States, Egbert Benson, a U.S. Representative who served as the Chief Judge of the United States Circuit Court for the Second Circuit. His paternal grandparents were Robert Benson and Tryntje "Catharina" (née Van Borsum) Benson.

Benson attended Columbia College, graduating in 1807.

== Career ==
From 1835 to 1841, and again in 1845 and 1846, Benson was a member of the Board of Aldermen, serving as that bodies president from 1836 to 1838. For a short period, he also served as acting Mayor.

In 1842, he was chosen as the 4th President of the Saint Nicholas Society of the City of New York.

== Personal life ==
On May 17, 1820, Benson was married to his cousin, Maria Cowenhoven (1803–1867), a daughter of John N. Cowenhoven and Susan (née Martense) Cowenhoven. Maria was a granddaughter of Judge Nicholas Cowenhoven, who had bought more than 200 acres in New Utrecht, Brooklyn (most of which Benson later owned), including what is known today as the Vechte–Cortelyou House. Together, they lived at 36 East 22nd Street and were the parents of eight children, including:

- Susan Benson (b. 1821)
- Robert Benson (1823–1883).
- Egbert Benson (1824–1843)
- George Martense Benson (1826–1867), who married Margaret J. Voorhees, daughter of Peter Voorhees (descendants of Coert van Voorhees), in 1856.
- Maria Elizabeth Benson (1830–1832), who died young.
- Henry Benson (1834–1844), who died young.
- Richard Hoffman Benson (1837–1889), who married Sarah Vanderpoel, daughter of Abraham B Vanderpoel.

Benson died in New York on February 25, 1866. After a funeral at the South Reformed Dutch Church in New York City, he was buried at New Utrecht Cemetery in New Utrecht (today known as Bensonhurst, New York).
