= Howard Duffield =

American historian

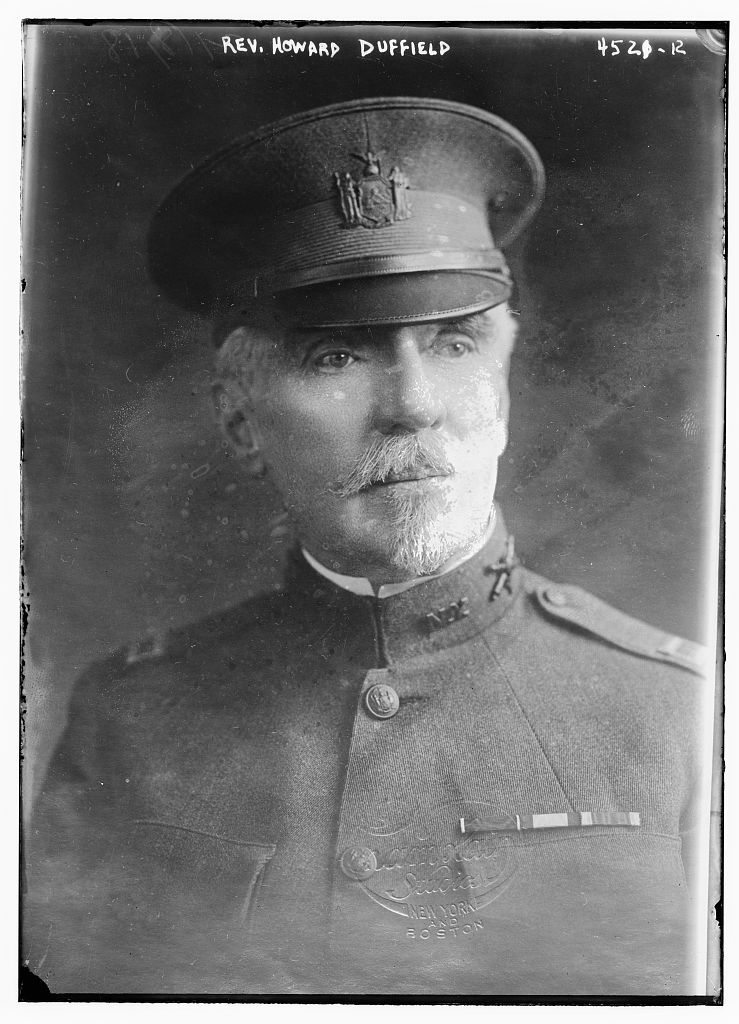
- Photograph of Duffield, c. 1915 – c. 1920

49th President of the Saint Nicholas Society of the City of New York
- In office 1922–1923
- Preceded by: Alfred Wagstaff Jr.

Personal details
- Born: George Howard Duffield; April 9, 1854 Princeton, New Jersey, U.S.
- Died: January 5, 1941 (aged 86) New York City, New York, U.S.
- Spouse: Catherine Nash Greenleaf (m. 1877–1936)
- Parent(s): John Thomas Duffield; Sarah Elizabeth Green Duffield
- Relatives: William Henry Green (uncle)
- Education: Princeton University; Princeton Theological Seminary

George Howard Duffield (April 9, 1854 — January 5, 1941) was a prominent American minister in New York City.

== Early life ==
Duffield was born on April 8, 1854, in Princeton, New Jersey. He was the son of Dr. John Thomas Duffield (1823—1901), a professor of Mathematics at Princeton, and Sarah Elizabeth (née Green) Duffield. Among his siblings was Edward Dickinson Duffield (acting president of Princeton University); Helen Duffield; John Fletcher Duffield; and Henry Green Duffield.

His maternal grandparents were George Smith Green and Sarah Stewart (née Kennedy) Green and his uncle was Rev. Dr. William Henry Green, a scholar of the Hebrew language. Through his mother's family, he was in the seventh generation from Jonathan Dickinson, the first president of the College of New Jersey (today known as Princeton University).

Duffield graduated from Princeton University in 1873, where he received the Junior Orator Medal, and the Princeton Theological Seminary in 1877. In November 1888, he received an honorary Doctor of Divinity from Princeton.

== Career ==
Duffield was a Presbyterian minister, first at Leacock Presbyterian Church in Leacock Township, Pennsylvania, then the Presbyterian Church of Beverly, New Jersey, followed by the Westminster Church in Detroit, and finally in 1891 the Old First Presbyterian Church in Manhattan (founded in 1716), at 11th Street and Fifth Avenue, which was merged with the Madison Square Presbyterian Church in 1918. Duffield "believed in the importance of the preached word and embraced the notion of an outdoor pulpit, allowing him in the summers to preach to crowd's on Old First's lawn." In 1916, which was also his twenty-fifth year in the pulpit, he published A Bird's Eye View of the Twelve Months' Work at the Old First Church: Reports of the Boards, Societies and Clubs of the Old First Presbyterian Church in the City of New York.

Duffield was elected a member of the Saint Nicholas Society of the City of New York, an organization in New York City of men descended from early inhabitants of the State of New York. Beginning in 1922, he served two terms as the Society's 49th President, succeeding Alfred Wagstaff Jr.

== Personal life ==
In May 1877, Duffield was married to Catherine Nash Greenleaf (1852—1936), a daughter of Thomas Greenleaf and Eleanor (née Leal) Greenleaf. Both Catherine and her brother James Leal Greenleaf, a prominent landscape architect, were Mayflower descendants. Together, they lived at 36 Washington Square West and were the parents of:

- George Greenleaf Duffield, who died in infancy.
- Howard Leal Duffield (1879–1884), who died young.
- Eleanor Van Dyck Duffield (1880–1939)
- Douglas Greenleaf Duffield (1882–1884), a twin who died in infancy.
- Stuart Kennedy Duffield (1882–1944), a twin.
- Winifred Duffield (b. 1887)

Duffield died at his apartment in the Hotel Holley at 36 Washington Square West, on January 5, 1941. He was buried at the Princeton Cemetery in Princeton, New Jersey.
