= James Monroe McLean =

American insurance executive and banker

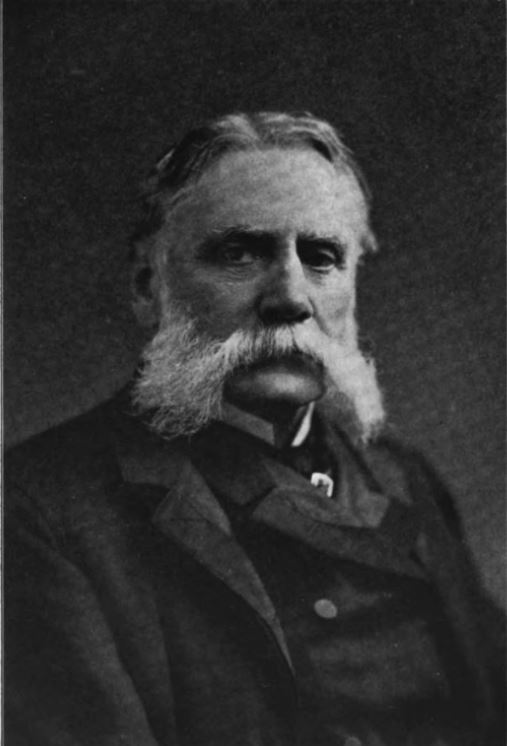

20th President of the Saint Nicholas Society of the City of New York
- In office 1873–1874
- Preceded by: Richard Edwards Mount Jr.
- Succeeded by: Augustus Rodney Macdonough

Personal details
- Born: December 8, 1818 New York City, New York, U.S.
- Died: May 13, 1890 (aged 71) New York City, New York, U.S.
- Spouse: Louisa Theresa Williams (m. 1840; died 1857)
- Children: 2

James Monroe McLean (December 8, 1818 – May 13, 1890) was an American insurance executive and banker.

== Early life ==
McLean was born in New York City on December 8, 1818. He was a son of Cornelius McLean (1787–1853) and Hannah (née Hammond) McLean (d. 1839), who married in 1807. His younger brother was George Washington McLean, who served as Major in command of the Old Guard.

His paternal grandparents were Elizabeth (née Swaim) McLean and Charles McLean, a descendant of the Clan Maclean of the Isle of Mull in Scotland. His maternal grandfather was Lt. Col. James Hammond, a prominent member of the First Regiment of Westchester County of the New York Militia, during the Revolutionary War.

== Career ==
After a private school education, he began his career with the Guardian Fire Insurance Company, founded by John Jacob Astor and Robert Lenox (father of James Lenox). In 1847, McLean began working for the Citizens Fire Insurance Company, later serving as Secretary and President for nearly forty years.

Beginning in 1860, McLean was elected and served as president of the New York Board of Fire Underwriters for four years. In this role, he was a "prominent factor in creating harmony among local fire insurance companies, and in establishing the present Fire Department." Upon the formation of the National Board of Fire Underwriters in 1866, he served as its first president and was reelected to a second term.

McLean also served as president, and long-time director, of the Manhattan Life Insurance Company (following the resignation of Henry Stokes), an original director and co-founder of the Manhattan Savings Bank, an original director of the National City Bank (predecessor bank of Citibank), and vice-president of the Union Trust Company.

In addition to his corporate work, McLean served as president of the New York City Board of Education for four years, was a trustee of the New York and Brooklyn Bridge, and served as president of the Institute for the Blind. In 1873, he became the 20th President of the Saint Nicholas Society of the City of New York, a charitable organization in New York City of men who are descended from early inhabitants of the State of New York.

== Personal life ==
In 1840, McLean was married to Louisa Theresa Williams (d. 1857). Together, they were the parents of:

- George Hammond McLean (1849–1913), a founder of the Lambs Club who married Harriet Amelia "Minnie" Dater, a daughter of Henry Dater.
- Cornelius McLean (b. 1841), who married Rebecca Hyslop.

McLean died of pneumonia in New York City on May 13, 1890. After a funeral held at his residence, he was buried at Woodlawn Cemetery in the Bronx. His family owned McLean Island on the Long Island Sound near Stamford, Connecticut.

=== Descendants ===
Through his son George, he was the grandfather of James Clarence Hammond McLean (1879–1956) and Alan Dater McLean (1889–1946), who married Florence Sims Wyeth in 1913. Florence was the only daughter of Dr. John Allan Wyeth and sister of Marion Sims Wyeth and John Allan Wyeth Jr.
