= Carlisle Norwood Jr. =

American lawyer

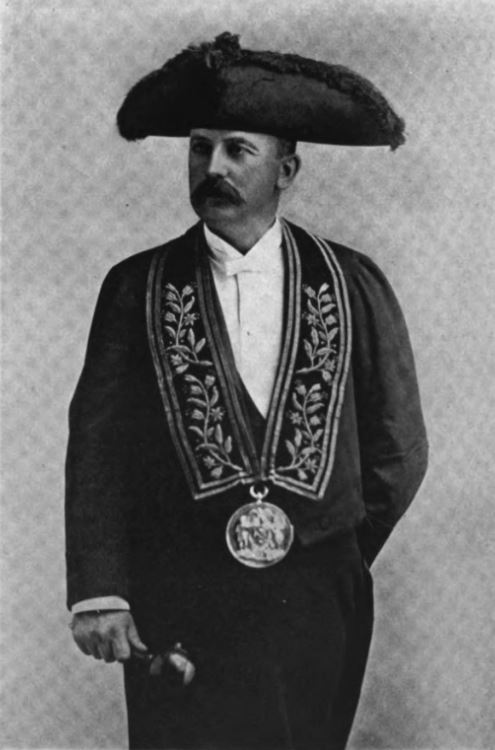

28th President of the Saint Nicholas Society of the City of New York
- In office 1887–1887
- Preceded by: Cornelius Vanderbilt II
- Succeeded by: John Cruger Mills

Personal details
- Born: March 5, 1846 New York City, New York, U.S.
- Died: November 19, 1936 (aged 90) New York City, New York, U.S.
- Spouse(s): Ethel Josephine Hanbury (m. 1871; died 1918) Ollie E. Seaman (m. 1918)
- Parent(s): Carlisle Norwood; Louisa Josephine Willcocks Norwood
- Education: Mt. Pleasant Military Academy

Carlisle Norwood Jr. (March 5, 1846 – November 19, 1936) was an American lawyer.

== Early life ==
Norwood was born on March 5, 1846, in Manhattan, New York. He was the son of Carlisle Norwood (1812–1892) and Louisa Josephine (née Willcocks) Norwood (1816–1891) who married in 1841. His father was president of the Lorillard Fire Insurance Company and was a Trustee of the Bleecker Street Bank and the Manhattan Life Insurance Company. Among his siblings were Margaret Morris Norwood, Louisa Norwood (wife of Lewis Bayard Smith), Kate Norwood, and Lewis Morris Norwood.

His paternal grandparents were Rebecca (née Ogilvie) Norwood and the merchant Andrew Sickles Norwood, a close friend of Gilbert du Motier, Marquis de Lafayette, who was one of the originators and owners of the second line of packet ships between New York and Le Havre. His maternal grandparents were Lewis Willcocks and Margaret (née Morris) Willcocks, a daughter of Andrew Morris and a direct descendant of Lewis Morris, an early Colonial Governor of New Jersey. His maternal aunt, Margaret (née Willcocks) Cecilia Mel de Fontenay, was the wife of John Mel de Fontenay.

Norwood attended Quanckenbos Collegiate School, a large collegiate school in New York, and the Mt. Pleasant Military Academy in Ossining, New York.

== Career ==
Norwood was admitted to the bar in New York on April 30, 1867, at the age of twenty-one, practicing for fifty-four years until his retirement in 1921, and was known as a jury lawyer and "expert on cross-examination." Throughout his many years in practice, he was partners with various attorneys, including Marshall S. Marden, Edwin Coggeshall for fifteen years (later president of the Lawyers Title and Guaranty Company), and Charles H. Dilly for ten years. In 1909, Norwood became partners with Thomas Leo Walsh under the firm of Norwood & Walsh, which continued after his retirement.

In 1887, he succeeded Cornelius Vanderbilt II to become the 28th President of the Saint Nicholas Society of the City of New York, a charitable organization in New York City of men who are descended from early inhabitants of the State of New York. He was also a member of The Metropolitan Club, the Riding and Driving Club, the Downtown Association and The Union League Club.

== Personal life ==
In 1871, Norwood was married to Ethel Josephine Hanbury (1850–1918) in New York City. Together, Ethel and Carlisle were the parents of:

- Eugenie Norwood, who married Theodore Cox, a divorced New York lawyer, in 1904.
- Josephine Hanbury Norwood (1872–c. 1935), who married Joel Rathbone in 1894.
- Carlisle Norwood III (1873–1954)
- Louise Norwood (b. 1875), who married Howard Slade (d. 1927), a broker with Hornickell, Slade & Wright.
- Erskine Norwood (1883–1883), who died in infancy.
- Eugene Norwood (1886–1972)

After the death of his first wife, Norwood remarried to Ollie E. Seaman in 1918, who also predeceased him, dying in 1929. After her death, he resided, with his son Carlisle, at the Prince George Hotel on 28th Street and Fifth Avenue.

Norwood died at the New York Hospital on November 19, 1936. He was buried at New York City Marble Cemetery.

=== Descendants ===
Through his daughter Josephine, he was the grandfather of the soldier Norwood Rathbone (b. 1895), who married Elizabeth Livingston Hall, daughter of Edward L. Hall and a first cousin of Eleanor Roosevelt, in 1922.
