= James R. Manley =

American physician and professor

4th President of the Saint Nicholas Society of the City of New York
- In office 1844–1845
- Preceded by: Egbert Benson
- Succeeded by: Samuel Jones

Personal details
- Born: April 5, 1782 Philadelphia, Pennsylvania
- Died: November 21, 1851 (aged 69) New York City, New York, U.S.
- Spouse: Elizabeth Post (m. 1804)
- Children: Emma Catherine Embury
- Education: Columbia College; Columbia University College of Physicians and Surgeons

James R. Manley (April 5, 1782 – November 21, 1851) was an American medical doctor and professor of obstetrics who was prominent in New York City.

== Early life ==
Manley was born in Philadelphia, Pennsylvania on April 5, 1782. He was the son of Robert and Catharine Manley. His father, a native of Maryland, who was a Captain in the Continental Army known for his "zeal and active exertions in the cause of the Revolution." His mother was a native of New York who was "a daughter of one of the old Dutch burghers." His elder brother, John Manley, was a midshipman under Commodore Joshua Barney in the Continental Navy.

At the age of 13, Manley entered Columbia College and graduated in 1799.

== Career ==
After studying medicine with Dr. John R. B. Rogers (father of Dr. J. Kearney Rogers), he received his Doctor of Medicine from Columbia in 1803 and began practicing physician in New York City. Dr. Manley treated many prominent men of times, including author Thomas Paine on his deathbed in 1809. In 1828, he was appointed "Resident Physician" of New York and held the office for twelve years under various governors. In 1839, following the resignation of Dr. Edward Delafield in 1838, Manley served as professor of obstetrics and the diseases of women and children at the College of Physicians and Surgeons. On November 6, 1839, he gave an introductory address on to the medical students in medicine of the College of Physicians and Surgeons of the University of the State of New York. From 1847 until his death in 1851, he was Consulting Physician and president of the Medical Board of Bellevue Hospital.

"During a long professional life Dr. M. received many evidences of distinction. In 1818 and 19 when the yellow fever prevailed to a fearful extent at the quarantine among the passengers from Europe, he assisted the health officer Dr. Dewitt who fell a victim to its ravages. When the deputy, Dr. Harrison was lying ill with the same disease, the board of health solicited Dr. M. to take charge of the sick at quarantine which he did; searlessly faced the fatal pestilence and continued in charge for two months and until the post of danger had become a place of safety. In 1828 Gov. Clinton was intending to nominate him to the Senate as Health Officer, but after the Governor's sudden decease the nomination was found, in his writing, on his table ready to be sent to the Senate the next day. Dr. Manley had warned the Governor a day or two before his death of his liability to an attack of apoplexy and advised him to discontinue for a time his severe application to the duties of his office, and all other mental exertions, but the warning came too late the mandate had gone forth the thread was breaking at the time the warning was pronounced."

He served as president of the New York State Medical Society in 1826. On July 11, 1828, he gave an eulogium address on De Witt Clinton, the recently deceased governor of New York at the request of a joint committee of the Medical Society and College of Physicians and Surgeons, in the hall of Columbia College. In 1849, he served as the vice-president of the New York Academy of Medicine.

In 1844, he was chosen as the 4th President of the Saint Nicholas Society of the City of New York.

== Personal life ==
In 1804, Dr. Manley was married to Elizabeth "Betsy" Post, the daughter of Col. Anthony Post, "one of the old and highly respectable Dutch residents of New-York," who had a prominent country seat at Bloomingdale. After their marriage, they moved to Greenwich Village, and in 1841, he lived at 19 White Street and in 1844, he resided at 74 Second Avenue. Together, they were the parents of three children, one unmarried daughter predeceased him, including:

- James Manley, also a doctor.
- Emma Catharine Manley (1806–1863), a poet and novelist who married Daniel Embury (1795–1864), president of the Atlantic Bank in Brooklyn, in 1828.

Dr. Manley died, aged 70, on November 21, 1851. Through his daughter Emma, he was the grandfather of Daniel Embury Jr. (1835–1869), Philip Augustus Embury (1836–1861) (who was murdered in Fishkill, New York in 1861), and James William Embury, and one daughter Anna K. Sheldon.
