= Stiles Franklin Stanton =

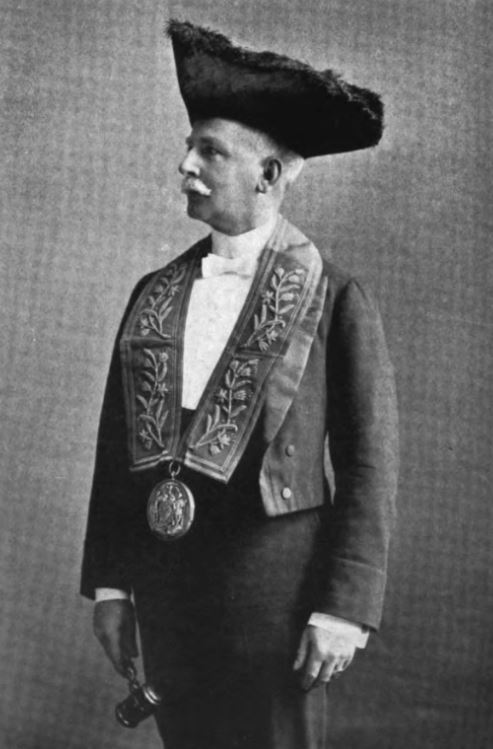

35th President of the Saint Nicholas Society of the City of New York
- In office 1898–1899
- Preceded by: Edward King
- Succeeded by: Frederic de Peyster Foster

Personal details
- Born: April 2, 1846 New York City, New York, U.S.
- Died: June 15, 1907 (aged 61) New York City, New York, U.S.
- Relations: William Preble Hall (brother-in-law)
- Parent(s): Samuel Billings Stanton; Lydia Gardinier Conrad Stanton

Stiles Franklin Stanton (April 2, 1846 – June 15, 1907) was an American broker on Wall Street who served as president of the Saint Nicholas Society of the City of New York.

== Early life ==
Stanton was born in New York City on April 2, 1846. He was the son of Samuel Billings Stanton (1809–1875) and Lydia Gardinier (née Conrad) Stanton (1824–1892). Among his siblings was Katherine Conrad Stanton, the wife of General William Preble Hall, and Mary Billings Stanton, the wife of Samuel William Richardson.

His paternal grandfather was Capt. Samuel Stanton and Mary "Polly" (née Noyes) Stanton. His maternal grandparents were Henry Conrad and Blandina (née Tappan) Conrad and his paternal uncle was Peter Tappan Conrad.

Stanton was educated at the College of the City of New York.

== Career ==
As a young man, Stanton went to Wall Street, became a broker, and was a member of the New York Stock Exchange for thirty years until his retirement around 1897.

He was a member of the Sons of the Revolution in the State of New York. On March 1, 1875, he was elected a member of the Saint Nicholas Society, an organization in New York City of men descended from early inhabitants of the State of New York. After being an officer of the Society for several years, from 1898 to 1898, he served as the 35th president of the organization. Stanton was a member of the Downtown Club and the Union Club of the City of New York and was actively interested in the Samaritan Home for the Aged, a manager of the New York Infant Asylum and a trustee of the New York Dispensary.

== Personal life ==
Stanton, who never married, died at his residence, 145 East 36th Street in Manhattan, on June 15, 1907. After a funeral at the Brick Presbyterian Church in New York, he was buried at Evergreen Cemetery in Stonington in New London County, Connecticut.
