= Charles Roome =

American soldier, engineer, and businessman

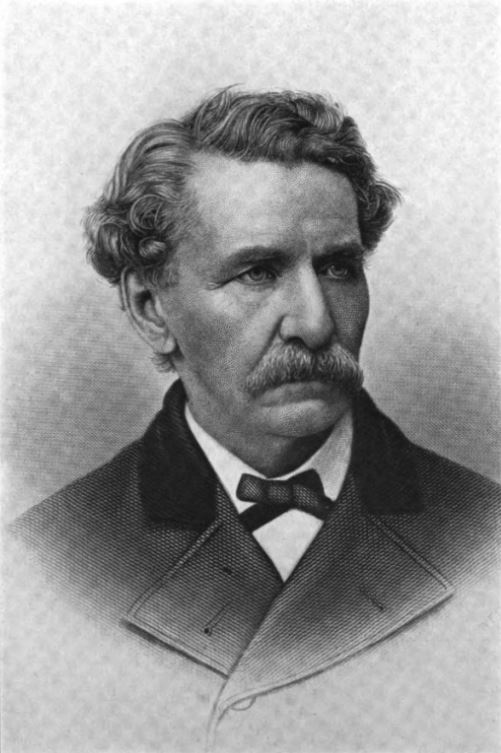

16th President of the Saint Nicholas Society of the City of New York
- In office 1867–1867
- Preceded by: Augustus Schell
- Succeeded by: James William Beekman

Personal details
- Born: August 4, 1812 New York City, New York, U.S.
- Died: June 28, 1890 (aged 77) New York City, New York, U.S.
- Spouses: Anna Catherine Wheeler (m. 1836; died 1855) Mary Marvin Wells (m. 1857)
- Children: 5
- Parent(s): Jenima Lewis Roome; Nicholas Roome

Charles Roome (August 4, 1812 – June 28, 1890) was an American soldier, engineer, and businessman.

== Early life ==
Roome was born on August 4, 1812, in New York City. He was the eleventh of twenty children born to Jemima (née Lewis) Roome (1797–1854) and Nicholas Roome (1775–1824), a wealthy merchant who served as Superintendent of the "Old State Prison" in New York City.

His paternal grandparents were Rachel (née De Groot) Roome and Peter Roome, a descendant of William Jansen Roome, a New Amsterdam settler. His maternal grandparents were Rachel (née Van Benschoten) Lewis and Thomas Lewis, who served during the Revolutionary War in the 3rd Regiment of the Line under Col. Clinton in the invasion of Canada and as quartermaster under Col. Henry Ludington.

== Career ==
After a Normal School education, Roome began in the mercantile business. In 1838, he began working in the engineering staff at the Manhattan Gas Light Company, becoming Engineer-in-Chief in 1842 and president in January 1854, succeeding Henry Young.

At the outbreak of the U.S. Civil War, Roome was a Captain of Company D in the 7th New York State Militia. He then helped organize the 37th New York Volunteer Infantry Regiment of the Union Army and was appointed Colonel in command in 1861. He led the 37th New York for the entire war and for "faithful and meritorious service", he was brevetted Brigadier General of the U.S. Volunteers by President Andrew Johnson on March 13, 1865.

After the war, Roome again served as the president of the Manhattan Gas Light Company until 1884, when he became president of the new organization, the Consolidated Gas Company of New York, of which he was also a director. He served as president until his retirement in 1886.

In 1867, he became the 16th President of the Saint Nicholas Society of the City of New York. In 1879, he was Grand Master of the Grand Lodge of New York. Roome, a Knights Templar, was "exalted a Royal Arch Mason in Jerusalem Chapter No. 8, Royal Arch Masons in May of 1866 and served as High Priest in 1882 and 1883." He also served as Royal Arch Grand Master from 1886 to 1889.

== Personal life ==
Roome was twice married. In 1836, he married his first wife, Anna Catherine Wheeler, the daughter of Hezekiah Wheeler. Together, they were the parents of three children, including:

- Emilie Frances Roome (1838–1866), who married Theodore Weld Parmele (1833–1893), grandson of Judge Jonas Platt, in 1870. After her death, Theodore remarried to Mary Platt, his cousin and the daughter of Zephaniah Platt.
- Anna Catherine Roome, who married Louis V. Sutherland in 1867.
- Frederick Roome, who died in infancy.

After the death of his first wife in 1855, he remarried to Mary Marvin Wells (1823–1904), the daughter of Ann Maria Olcott and Richard Isaac Wells, on June 2, 1857. Mary and Charles were the parents of two more children, including:

- Claudius Monell Roome (1860–1920), a Columbia University graduate and Reverend. He married Mary Flocton Crocker, daughter of Eugene Crocker.
- William Harris Roome (b. 1861), a Columbia University graduate and lawyer. He married Louise George.

Roome died of bronchitis and pneumonia at his home, 29 West 52nd Street in New York on June 28, 1890. After a funeral service at St. Thomas Episcopal Church, he was buried at Green-Wood Cemetery in Brooklyn.

=== Descendants ===
Through his daughter Emily, he was the grandfather of Charles Roome Parmele and Helen Livingston Parmele, who married siblings, Alice Butler and J. Holmes Butler.
