= Charles Augustus Schermerhorn =

American real estate investor and insurance executive

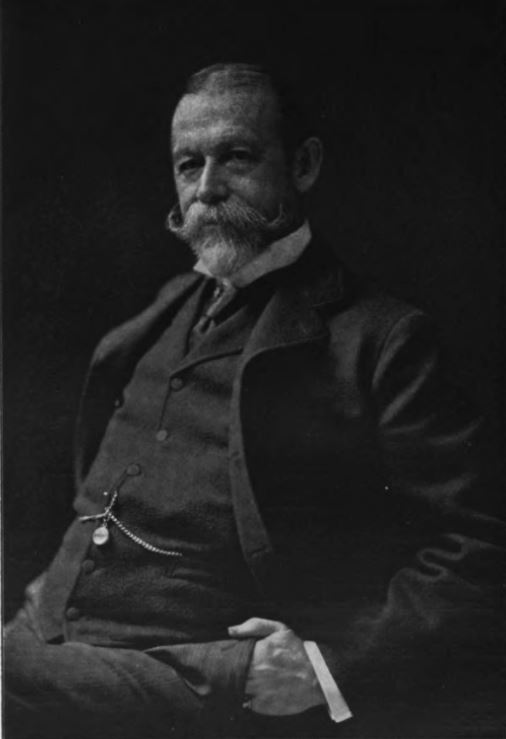

41st President of the Saint Nicholas Society of the City of New York
- In office 1910–1911
- Preceded by: William Jay
- Succeeded by: John Thomas Lockman

Personal details
- Born: January 1, 1839; Manhattan, New York, U.S.
- Died: October 2, 1914 (aged 75); Manhattan, New York, U.S.
- Spouse: Louise Schermerhorn (m. 1880)
- Relations: Abraham Schermerhorn (grand-uncle)
- Children: E. Constance Schermerhorn
- Parent(s): George S. Schermerhorn; Maria Grim Schermerhorn

Charles Augustus Schermerhorn (January 1, 1839 – October 2, 1914) was an American real estate investor and insurance executive.

== Early life ==
Schermerhorn was born on January 1, 1839. He was the son of George Stevens Schermerhorn Sr. (1807–1885) and Maria Isabella (née Grim Schermerhorn) (1808–1890). Among his siblings was Maria Isabella Schermerhorn, George Stevens Schermerhorn Jr. (who married Julia M. Gilbert), and Edward Eugene Schermerhorn. His father was a merchant and who was associated in the ship chandlery business with his uncle Horatio.

His paternal grandparents were Rebecca Hodgden (née Stevens) Schermerhorn (a daughter of General Ebenezer Stevens) and John Peter Schermerhorn, a merchant. His grandfather and grand-uncle, Abraham Schermerhorn, were both sons of Peter Schermerhorn. His maternal grandfather was Philip Grim.

== Career ==
From 1862 to 1863, he served in the 7th Regiment of the New York Militia.

He was involved in managing his family estate, including real estate investments and insurance. His office was in the Marbridge Building on the east side of Herald Square at the corner of 34th Street and Broadway. Schermerhorn was a member of many prominent societies, a vestryman of Trinity Church and a trustee of St. Luke's. He was also a member of the General Society of the War of 1812, Post Lafayette Grand Army of the Republic, the Society of Colonial Wars, the Holland Society, the Church Club and a member of the 7th Regiment Veteran Association.

He served as secretary and the 41st President of the Saint Nicholas Society of the City of New York.

== Personal life ==
On June 3, 1880, Schermerhorn was married to his cousin, Louise Schermerhorn (1849–1924), in Trinity Church in Manhattan. Louise was the daughter of Dr. John Peter Schermerhorn and Louise (née Williamson) Schermerhorn. Together, they were the parents of:

- Elizabeth Constance Schermerhorn (1886–1981), who married J. Harper Skillin, a son of Edward and Dallas Hewlett Skillin, in 1933.

Schermerhorn died at his home, 1219 Madison Avenue in New York City, on October 2, 1914.
