= Frederic de Peyster Foster =

American lawyer and philanthropist (1849–1929)

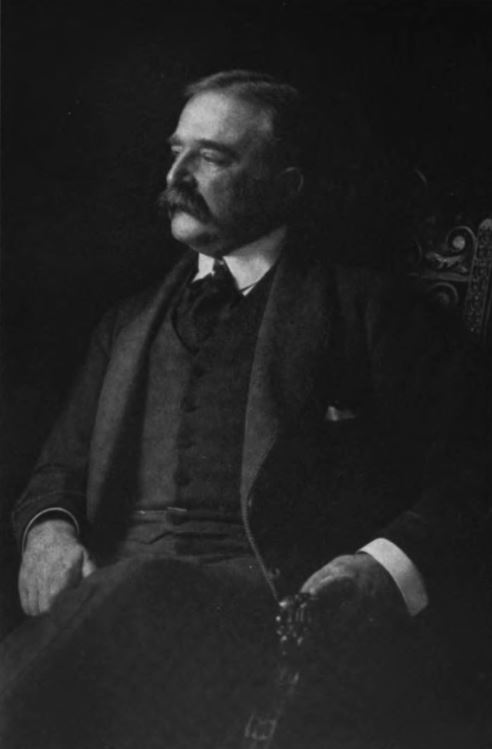

36th President of the Saint Nicholas Society of the City of New York
- In office 1900–1907
- Preceded by: Stiles Franklin Stanton
- Succeeded by: Stuyvesant Fish

Personal details
- Born: February 20, 1849 Manhattan, New York, U.S.
- Died: May 25, 1929 (aged 80) Tuxedo Park, New York, U.S.
- Resting place: St. Mary's-in-Tuxedo Episcopal Church Cemetery, Tuxedo Park, New York, U.S.
- Spouse: Julia Marshall Talbot (m. 1893)
- Children: 1
- Education: Columbia University; Columbia Law School

Frederic de Peyster Foster (February 20, 1849 – May 25, 1929) was a prominent American lawyer and philanthropist.

== Early life ==
Foster was born in Manhattan on February 20, 1849. He was the eldest surviving son of Frederic Giraud Foster (1809–1879) and Emily (née Hone) Foster (1818–1875) who married in 1844. Among his siblings was Clara Foster (wife of Richard Delafield), Giraud Foster (who accumulated a large fortune from coal and shipping), Marie Antoinette Foster (sister-in-law of William Watts Sherman), Emily Hone Foster (wife of Charles de Rham), and Albert Edward Foster. His father was a successful merchant with Foster & Giraud, later Andrew Foster & Sons.

His paternal grandparents were Ann (née Giraud) Foster and Andrew Foster, one of New York's foremost merchants. His maternal grandparents were John Hone Jr. and Maria Antoinette (née Kane) Hone (a direct descendant of Gerardus Beekman and Wilhelmus Beekman). After his grandfather's death in 1829, his grandmother remarried to Frederic de Peyster, his namesake, in 1839.

Foster attended Columbia University, earning an A.B. degree in 1868. Following his graduation from Columbia, he studied law in Paris from 1869 to 1870. He returned to the United States and obtained an A.M. degree from Columbia in 1871, and an LL.B. degree from Columbia Law School in 1872.

== Career ==
After being admitted to the bar in New York, Foster began practicing law in 1872, with an office at 44 Wall Street in Lower Manhattan. He later went into partnership with his brother-in-law, George Herbert Carey, under the name Carey & Foster. He was a trustee of White Deer Lands in Carson County, Texas, a company created after the foreclosure of the Francklyn Land and Cattle Company. Along with Cornelius C. Cuyler, he hired George Tyng to manage the lands (who hired Timothy Dwight Hobart). He also served as a trustee of the Central Hanover Bank & Trust Company.

He was elected a member of the Saint Nicholas Society of the City of New York, an organization in New York City of men descended from early inhabitants of the State of New York, and, in 1900, served two terms as the Society's 42nd President. He also served as a chairman of the Board of Trustees of the New York Society Library in 1907 (and Treasurer in 1899).

== Personal life ==
In 1893, Foster was married to Julia Marshall Talbot (1849–1937). They lived at 721 Fifth Avenue, were listed on the Social Register, and together, were the parents of one son: Richmond Talbot Foster, who died in 1932.

Foster died on May 25, 1929, in Tuxedo Park, New York, where he maintained a home. He was buried at St. Mary's-in-Tuxedo Church Cemetery in Tuxedo Park. His wife died in September 1937.
