= Richard Edwards Mount Jr. =

American lawyer, writer and clubman

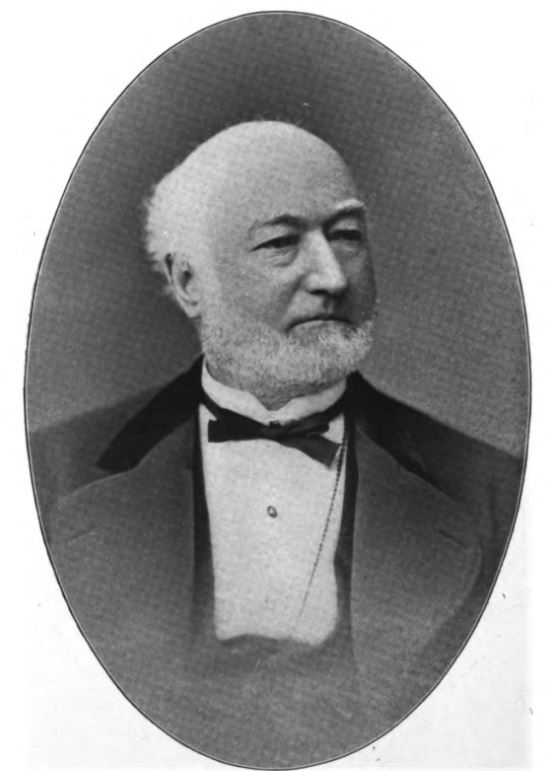

19th President of the Saint Nicholas Society of the City of New York
- In office 1871–1872
- Preceded by: Benjamin Hazard Field
- Succeeded by: James Monroe McLean

Personal details
- Born: September 3, 1814 New York City, New York, U.S.
- Died: March 31, 1880 (aged 65) New York City, New York, U.S.
- Parent(s): Richard Edwards Mount; Maria Branson Mount
- Education: Columbia College; Columbia Law School

Richard Edwards Mount Jr. (September 3, 1814 – March 31, 1880) was an American lawyer, writer and clubman.

== Early life ==
Mount was born in New York City on September 3, 1814. He was the eldest son of Richard Edwards Mount (1786–1872) and Maria (née Branson) Mount (1792–1873), who married in 1813. Among his younger siblings was Henry Ritter Mount and Charlotte Anne Mount. His maternal grandparents were Capt. Ware and Mary Branson. His paternal grandparents were Joseph Mount and Mary (née Edwards) Mount. His father was "a wealthy citizen well known in the commercial circles of the metropolis for his business energy and probity."

In his early youth, he was known as "one of the men about town, the intimate companion of Halleck, Willis, and the elder Wallack, and gentlemen of their class."

== Career ==
Mount attended Columbia College, graduating with an A.B. degree in 1834 (alongside James William Beekman and Isaac C. Delaplaine) and an A.M. degree in 1837.

After graduating from Columbia, Mount passed the bar and began practicing law after entering the law office founded by James Alexander, the 4th New Jersey Attorney General (who also served as attorney general for the Province of New York and was the father of William Alexander, Lord Stirling). Reportedly, Mount earned a fortune from practicing law, retiring after his father's death (after inheriting an "ample fortune") and four years before his own death in 1876.

In 1871, he became the 19th President of the Saint Nicholas Society of the City of New York, a charitable organization in New York City of men who are descended from early inhabitants of the State of New York. Mount also served as Assistant Secretary of the organization from 1851 to 1857, Secretary from 1859 to 1864, Fourth Vice-president from 1865 to 1866, Third Vice-president in 1867, Second Vice-president from 1868 to 1869, and First Vice-president in 1870.

== Personal life ==
Mount "was never happier than when poring over the old Latin poets. He was deeply interested in musical and dramatic affairs" and contributed to various papers on social and other topics. He was a member of the Old Shakespeare Club, the Century Club (serving as treasurer), the University Club, the Union Club (serving as treasurer), the New York Society Library (also serving as treasurer), and was a frequenter of the Café Français ("the head-quarters of the wit and talent of the metropolis") and a contributor to The Knickerbocker. According to his obituary in The New York Times, Mount was:

"Devoted to the society of wits and bon vivants, he never married, but passed his life in the clubs and cafés and in the salons of artists and literary men. He was a fine specimen of the gentleman of the old Knickerbocker days."

Mount died of pneumonia at his residence, 4 West 21st Street in New York City (which he shared with three unmarried sisters), on March 31, 1880, three weeks after the death of his brother in Stamford, Connecticut. After a funeral at Trinity Church, he was buried at Trinity Church Cemetery in New York (near Fort Washington).
