= Mt. Pleasant Military Academy =

Former military school established in 1814

Coordinates: 41°9′31.1″N 73°51′53.3″W

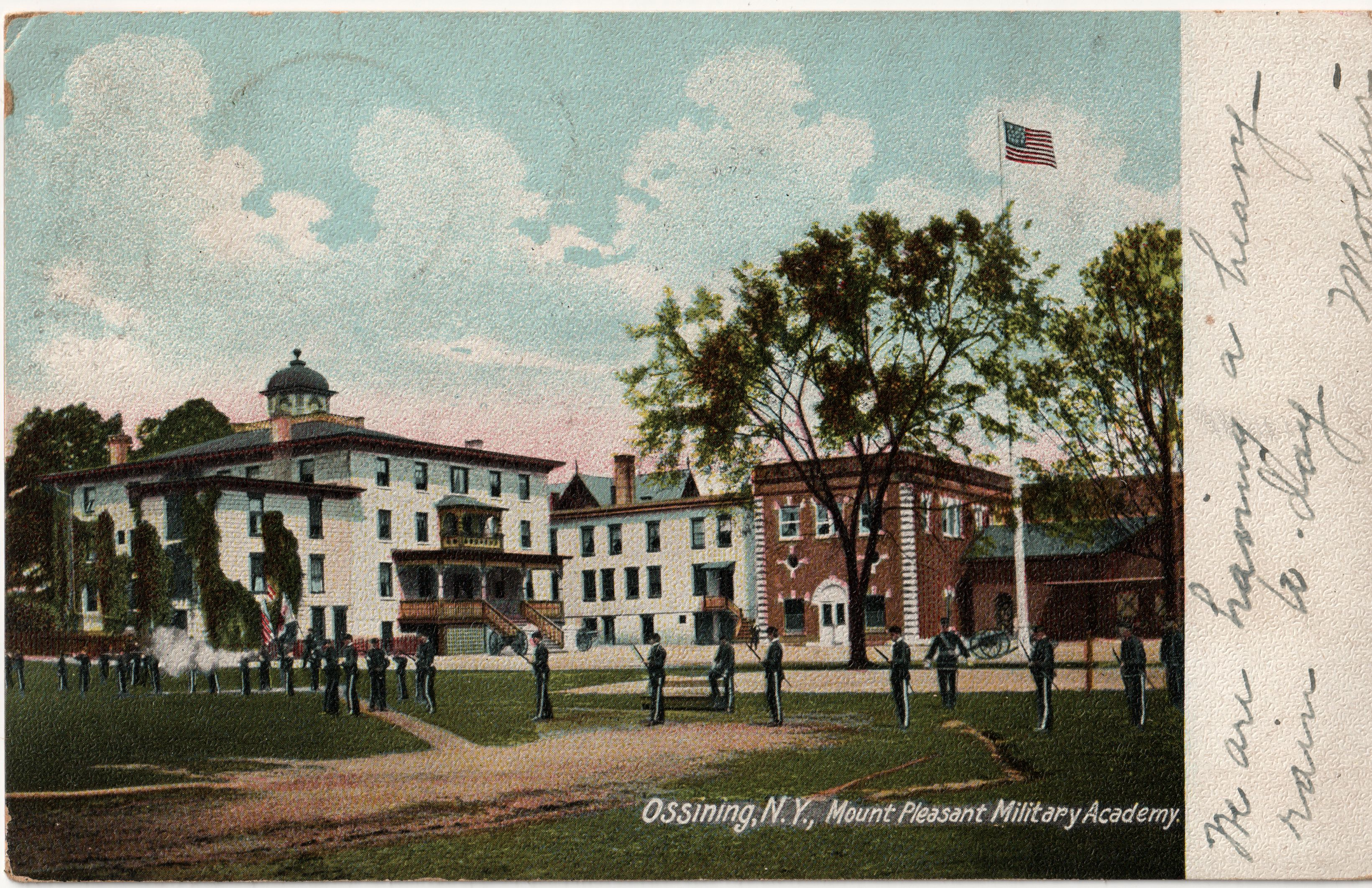
Mount Pleasant Military Academy in about 1905

Mt. Pleasant Military Academy is a former military school established in 1814 in Ossining, New York. The academy closed in 1925, its facilities later to be used as offices by William Arthur Slater, a surveyor.

== Founding ==
Money for the establishment of the school was raised through voluntary contributions from the people of Westchester County, New York, and elsewhere. The first contribution was made on November 13, 1813, and up to August, 1831, the sum of $1,083.81 had been contributed. The school opened as Mount Pleasant Academy, a coed educational institution. It became a male-only military academy in 1848 under Marlborough Churchill (1816-1899), with a curriculum modeled on that of West Point Academy. A new building was erected in 1878.

== 20th-Century ==
Mount Pleasant Hall, or Mr. Brusie's School for Young Boys, adjoined the Mount Pleasant Academy. The property was the birthplace of New York Governor J.T. Hoffman and was sold by him to the school. Boys of "good character" under thirteen were accepted here for Forms 1 through 5. In 1909 the Hall had 24 students.

As of 2020 the only surviving structure is the former library building, located at 23 State Street.

== Notable alumni ==
- John Barrymore, actor
- Willis B. Burns, businessman and politician from Syracuse, New York
- Wallace A. Downs, New York National Guard officer and businessman
- Edmond Genet, American pilot who died in 1917 while flying with the Lafayette Escadrille
- Henry W. Hubbell, class of 1860, US Army brigadier general
- Carlisle Norwood Jr., Attorney
