= John Edward Parsons =

American lawyer

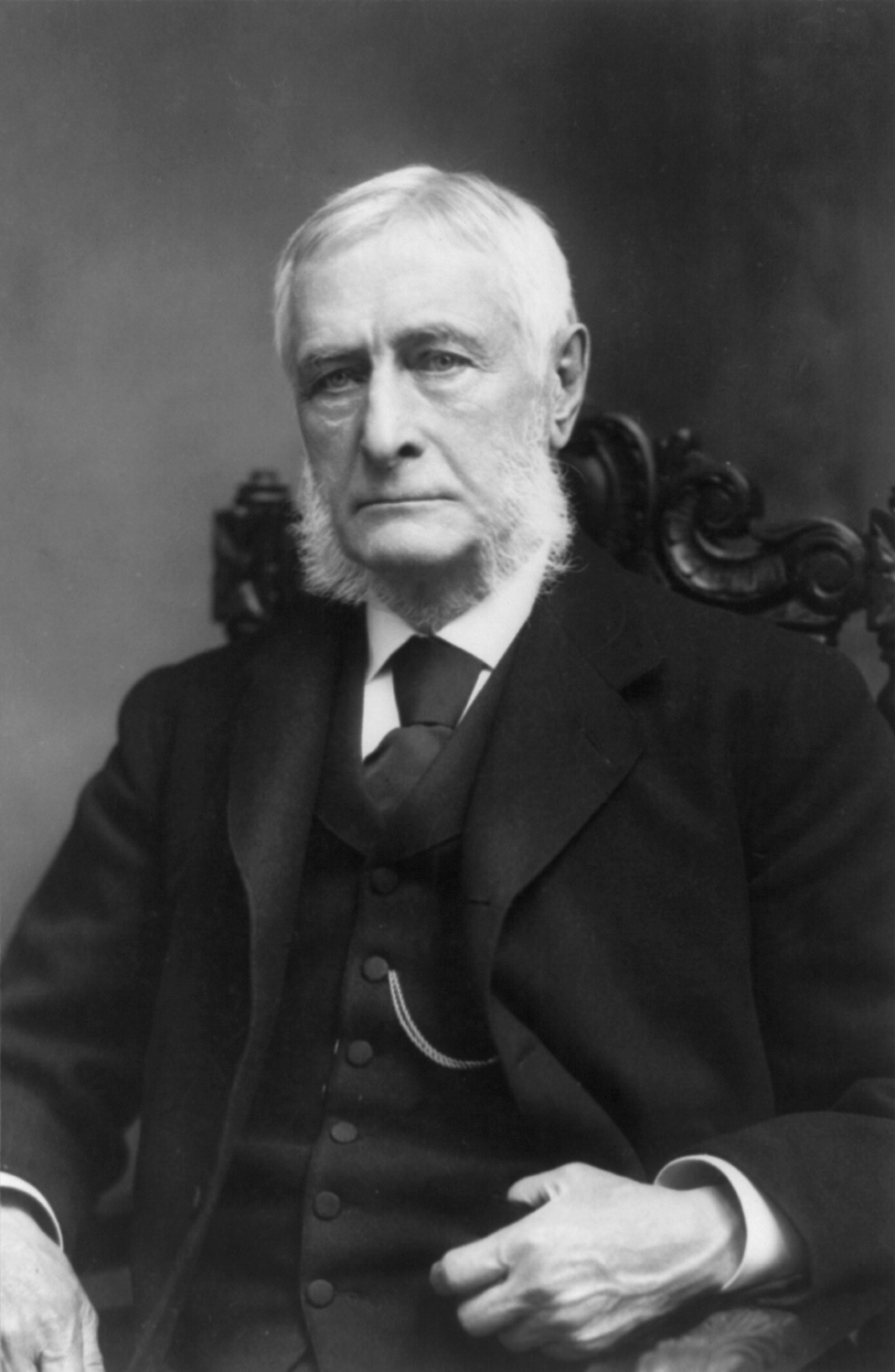
- Parsons, c. 1910

President of the New York City Bar Association
- In office 1900-1901
- Preceded by: James C. Carter
- Succeeded by: William Gardner Choate

Personal details
- Born: October 24, 1829 New York City, U.S.
- Died: February 16, 1915 (aged 85) New York City, U.S.
- Spouse(s): Mary D. McIlvaine; Florence V. C. Bishop
- Children: Herbert Parsons
- Education: New York University

John Edward Parsons (October 24, 1829 – January 16, 1915) was an American lawyer in New York City. He was president of the New York City Bar Association from 1900 to 1901 and the president of the Cooper Union from 1905 to 1915.

== Early life ==
Parsons was born in New York City in 1829 to Edward Lamb and Matilda Parsons. His father was English and his mother was descended from a prominent Wallingford, Connecticut family.

He was educated at New York University, where he earned a B.A. in 1848 and an M.A. in 1851. He also received an honorary M.A. from Yale Law School. and was admitted to the bar in 1851 or 1852.

== Career ==
Parsons began his legal career as the New York County Assistant District Attorney, where he managed many of the city's prosecutions. This would be the only public position he would hold in his career. He was a founding member, and later president, of the New York City Bar Association and played an important role in the Bar's prosecution of corrupt judges Albert Cardozo, John McCunn, D.P. Ingraham, and George Barnard. Later in his career, he started several practices, ultimately founding the firm Parsons, Closson & McIlvaine in 1902.

His largest client was the American Sugar Refining Company, the precursor to the Domino Sugar company. In United States v. E. C. Knight Co., Parsons successfully defended American Sugar Refining from an anti-trust suit by the United States government, preserving its over $90 million in assets. In 1900, Parsons – who had said about trusts "I believe in trusts. They are economic necessities calculated to benefit the public" – was indicted by a Federal Grand Jury in Washington, D.C. for restraint of trade in trying to monopolize the sugar industry. The case did not go to trial until 1912, and a jury could not reach a unanimous decision.

=== Social life and philanthropy ===
Parsons was a member of the board of a number of New York cultural institutions, including the American Museum of Natural History and the Metropolitan Museum of Art. He served as a member of the Council of New York University, appointed in 1867, and for several years president of the NYU Alumni Association.

He served as the third President of Cooper Union from 1905 to 1915.

Parsons was also a member of a number of gentlemen's clubs, including the University Club of New York, the Century Club, the Players Club and the Metropolitan Club, among others.

== Personal life ==
He was married twice, first to Mary Dumesnil McIlvaine (1834–1896), daughter of Bowes Reed McIlvaine and granddaughter of Joseph McIlvaine, U.S. Senator from New Jersey. The Reverend Charles Pettit McIlvaine, Bishop of the Episcopal Diocese of Ohio, was an uncle. His children by his first wife included:

- Edith Parsons (1865–1942), who married David Percy Morgan, the treasurer of American Sugar Refining Company.
- Herbert Parsons (1869–1925), a New York politician who married Elsie Worthington Clews (1875–1941), a daughter of financier and author Henry Clews.

After her death, he was married to Florence Van Corltandt (née Field) Bishop (1851–1922). Florence, the widow of David Wolfe Bishop, was the daughter of Benjamin Hazard Field, a merchant philanthropist, and the mother of David Wolfe Bishop Jr. and Cortlandt F. Bishop, the pioneer aviator.

Parsons had a summer estate called "Stoneover" in Lenox, Massachusetts, and was a member of both the Brick Presbyterian Church in New York and the Protestant Episcopal Church in Lenox,

Parsons died at his residence in New York City, 30 East 36th Street, on January 16, 1915. His will gave all his money to his wife and children, and decried what he called "posthumous charity."

Academic offices
Preceded by Edward Cooper	President of Cooper Union; 1905 — 1914	Succeeded by Robert Fulton Cutting
