= Emma Catherine Embury =

American author and poet

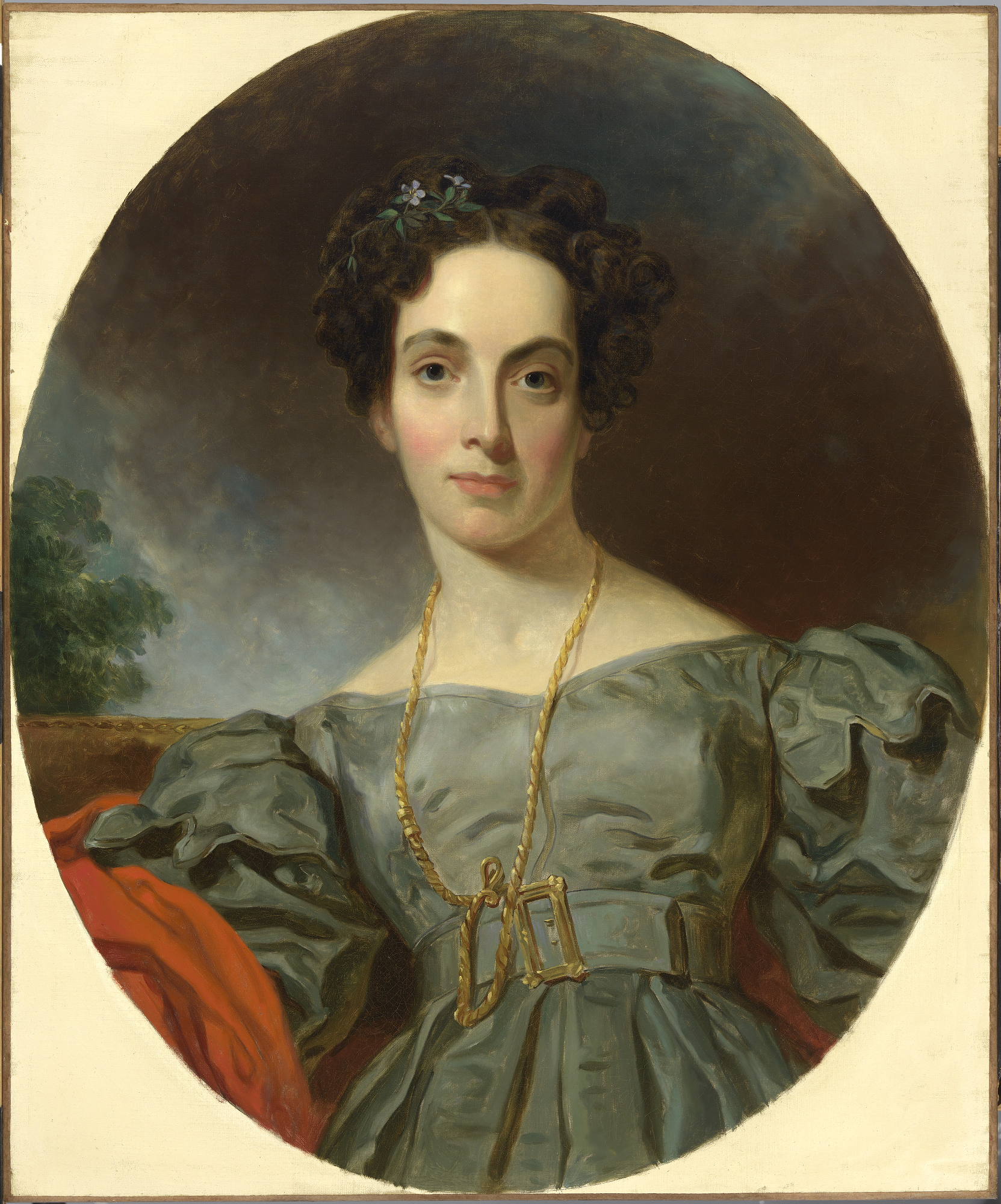
- Portrait by Henry Inman
- Born: Emma Catherine Manley; February 25, 1806; New York City, New York, U.S.
- Died: February 10, 1863 (aged 56); Brooklyn, New York, U.S.
- Occupations: author, poet
- Spouse: Daniel Embury (m. 1828)
- Writing career
- Pen name: Ianthe

Emma Catherine Embury (née Manley; February 25, 1806 – February 10, 1863) was an American writer and poet. Under the pen name of "Ianthe", she contributed to the periodicals of the day, and may be considered among the pioneers of female literature in the United States. Her many poems and tales were afterwards collected and published in book form. Among these volumes are The Blind Girl and Other Tales, Glimpses of Home Life, Pictures of Early Life, Nature's Gems, or American Wild Flowers (1845), and The Waldorf Family, a fairy tale of Brittany, partly a translation and partly original (1848).

== Early years ==
She was born Emma Catherine Manley in New York City on February 25, 1806. She was the eldest child of Dr. James R. Manley, an eminent physician of New York, and Elizabeth Post.

As a child she was precocious, and learned to read almost intuitively. Early on, she developed a talent for compositions, and her juvenile productions are remarkable for their graceful and flowing rhythm.

== Career ==
She became a regular contributor of juvenile verse and stories to the New York Mirror by the age of twenty. Many of her early writings were printed under the pseudonym "Ianthe".

On May 10, 1828, she married Daniel Embury, a mathematically-inclined Brooklyn banker. He husband appreciated fully the peculiar talents of his wife, and in every way encouraged their development. In her married life, she was singularly happy, and together, they drew around them a charmed circle of friends. In 1828, Embury published her first collection of poems, Guido, a Tale: Sketches from History and Other Poems, and in 1830, she published her first book of prose, Pictures of Early Life. For a time, she was one of two "lady editors" for Graham's Magazine in Philadelphia, along with Ann S. Stephens. During the 1830s and 1840s, she served as a host or guest at literary salons in New York City in the circle including Anne Lynch Botta and Frances Sargent Osgood.

It was an oft repeated remark of Embury, "Unless she read, she could not write," and her earlier poems had similarities with the poets she loved the best. Later, her originality asserted itself. The peculiar melodiousness of her verse rendered her one of the most graceful of songwriters, while the impassioned earnestness of her nature, her scorn of injustice, her quick sympathy with the oppressed, found expression in her poems, and ran a thread throughout them. In prose writing she confined herself, almost entirely to magazine writing. Her stories were extremely popular. They were easily written, contained a moral, and were fitted with wit and fancy.

As a conversationalist, Embury was rarely excelled. Her reading was extensive and varied, her memory retentive, her adaptation rapid, and her language forcible and graceful. She was the centre of a large circle, which numbered among its members many of the brightest names in literature. The head of a well ordered household, a tender and devoted wife and mother, an active and sympathizing friend, she passed many years in a constant discharge of her varied duties. Beginning in the late 1840s, she was stricken down by an illness from which she never recovered, and for the last few years of her life, she became an invalid, totally withdrawn from the world. She died in Brooklyn on February 10, 1863.

== Critical response ==
Embury was praised in her lifetime for writing works emphasizing domesticity and feminine virtue with moral messages appropriate for children. A critic for The United States Democratic Review, for example, wrote that her book Pictures of Early Life was "highly interesting and instructive; and of a character which should place it in the hands of youth, as well to instruct as to interest and amuse".

== Selected works ==
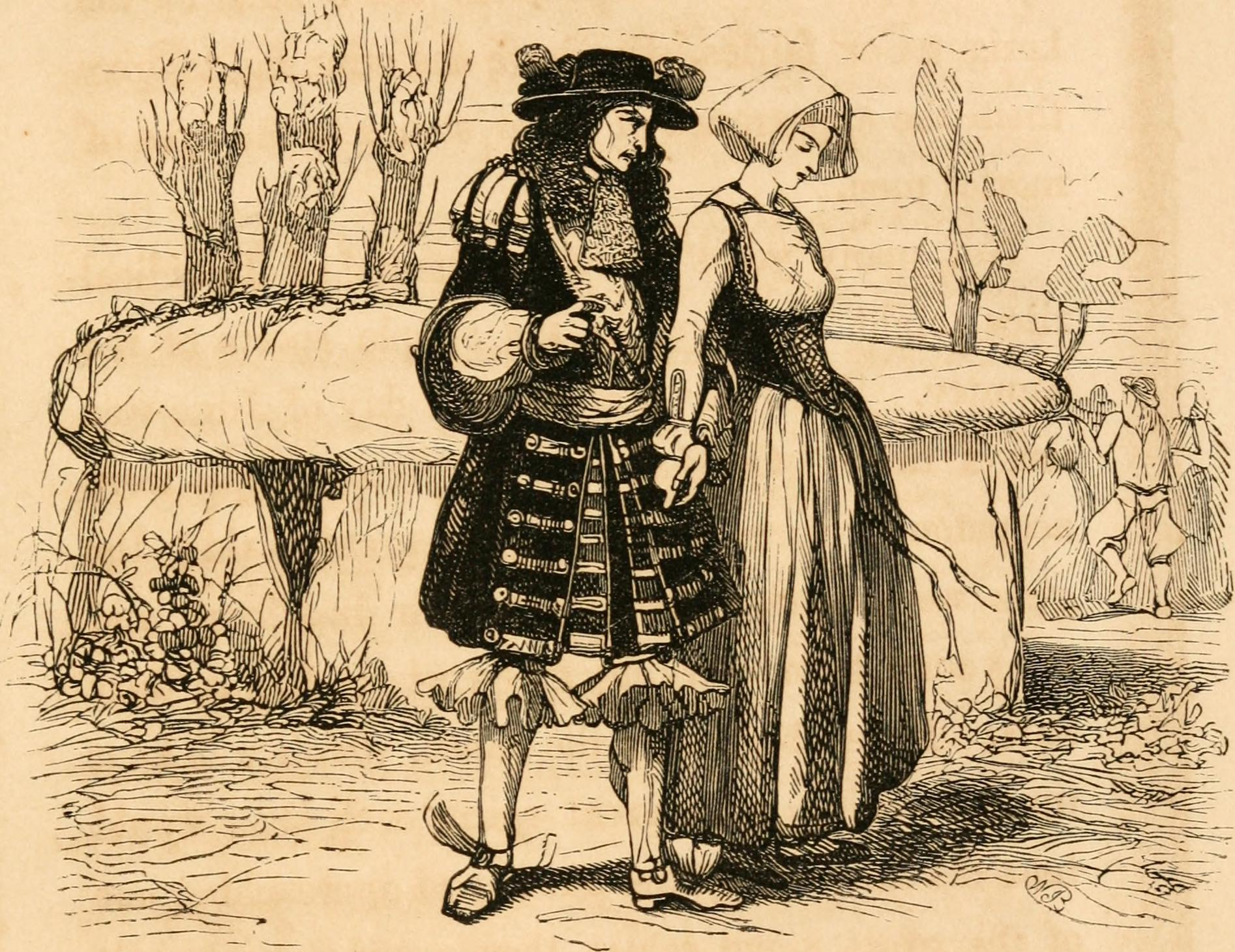
The Waldorf family; or, Grandfather's legends (1848)

- Guido: A Tale (1828)
- Love's Token Flowers (1846)
- Pictures of Early Life (1830)
- Constance Latimer: or, The Blind Girl (1838)
- American Wild Flowers in Their Native Haunts (1845)
- Glimpses of Home Life: or, Causes and Consequences (1848)
- The Waldorf Family: or, Grandfather's Legends (1848)

Other works published posthumously:

- The Greek Slave: A Story (1864)
- Poems of Emma C. Embury (1869)
- Prose Writings of Emma C. Embury (1893)
