= Giraud Foster =

American businessman and socialite (1850–1945)

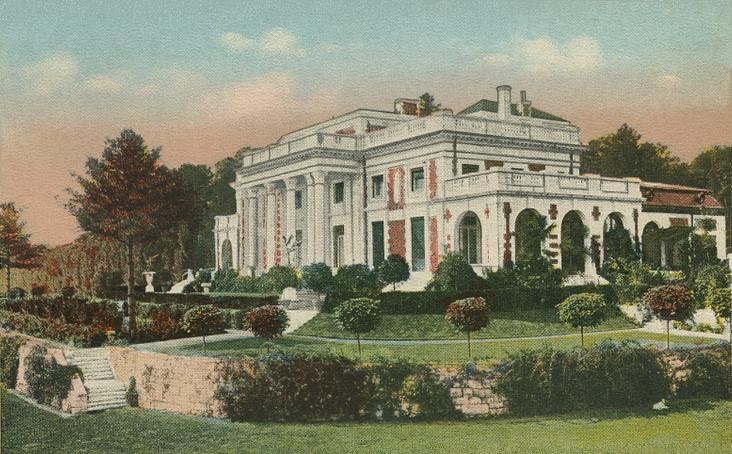
Foster's home Bellefontaine in 1912.

Giraud Foster (8 November 1850 – 22 September 1945) was a businessman and socialite notable during America's Gilded Age. An avid bridge player, equestrian and sailor, Foster accumulated a large fortune from coal and shipping.

== Early life ==
Foster was born on 8 November 1850 in New York City. He was a younger son of Frederic Giraud Foster (1809–1879) and Emily (née Hone) Foster (1818–1875) who married in 1844. Among his siblings were Frederic de Peyster Foster (a prominent lawyer and philanthropist), Clara Foster (wife of Richard Delafield), Marie Antoinette Foster (sister-in-law of William Watts Sherman), Emily Hone Foster (wife of Charles de Rham), and Albert Edward Foster. His father was a successful merchant with Foster & Giraud, later Andrew Foster & Sons.

His paternal grandparents were Ann (née Giraud) Foster and Andrew Foster, one of New York's foremost merchants. His maternal grandparents were John Hone Jr. and Maria Antoinette (née Kane) Hone (a direct descendant of Gerardus Beekman and Wilhelmus Beekman). After his grandfather's death in 1829, his grandmother remarried to Frederic de Peyster, his namesake, in 1839.

== Career ==
The Foster family had had a successful business in the clipper ship era, and he accumulated a large fortune from coal.

=== Social life ===
The Fosters were socially eminent public figures and entertained on a large scale. Foster was a member of the Knickerbocker Club, the Sons of the Revolution, and President of the Mahkeenac Boat Club and Canada's Restigouche Salmon Fishing Club. He was also a devout Christian and warden of Lenox's Trinity Episcopal Church. From 1915 until his death in 1945, he was president of the Lenox Club. He also served as president of the Wahkeenac Boat Club.

== Personal life ==
In 1893, he married Jean Van Nest (1860–1932), who could also trace her family back to the early settlers of New York. She was a daughter of Abraham Rynier Van Nest and Mary (née Thompson) Van Nest. The couple had one child, a son:

- Giraud Van Nest "Boy" Foster (1904–1980), who married Valerie Vernam, a daughter of Clarence Cottier Vernam, in 1926. They divorced and he married Suzanne Holloway Boyle, in 1946. They too divorced and he married Elizabeth (née Thorndike) Duncan, a daughter of Alden Augustus Thorndike who was the former wife of Stuart Duncan, in 1965.

Jean Foster died at Orange Grove, their winter home, in 1932. Foster died at Bellefontaine in 1945, leaving an estate valued at $527,551.65.

=== Bellefontaine ===
For the greater part of his long life, Foster resided at Bellefontaine, the classical 18th century-style mansion which he and his wife built, as a holiday 'cottage', between 1896 and 1898, at Lenox, Massachusetts.

While the Fosters spent their summers at Bellefontaine, they also had a winter home, Orange Grove, Aiken County, South Carolina. After his wife's death there in 1932, Foster sold the house three years later. During the Fosters' tenure, Bellefontaine became known as one of the great mansions of the gilded age. Designed by the eminent New York architectural firm of Carrere and Hastings, the house was built around an inner courtyard in a simple classic style; its principal facade dominated by a large portico. The design is reputed to be based on that of Ange-Jacques Gabriel's Petit Trianon at Versailles. While there are similarities between the two buildings, the dominating portico with a low upper floor above it, more closely resembles Gabriel's Pavilion de Louveciennes, while the rear facade shares many architectural similarities with the Chateau de Voisins also at Louveciennes.

The house was sold, in 1947, together with all its furnishings and 182 acres of land for $80,000. Shortly afterwards a fire gutted its interiors. The interior was rebuilt but not to anywhere near its elegant days of yore. After that, Bellefontaine was again sold to the Sacred Heart Priests and Brothers. The building was used as a minor seminary for boys interested in the priesthood. It was named Immaculate Heart of Mary Seminary. The S.C.J.s built a new attached wing which housed classrooms, rev rooms, a gymnasium, refectory, and a chapel. It was used as a seminary from 1961 until its close in 1978. It was sold to another developer but nothing was done to the beautiful residence. Again it was sold in the early 80s. The new owners demolished the newer buildings and also restored the beautiful sunken garden that Giraud had loved so much. The exterior of the building was restored and the interior was again rebuilt to suit the many clients of Canyon Ranch, which is an elite health spa.
