= Cortlandt F. Bishop =

American pioneer aviator, balloonist, autoist, book collector and traveler

Cortlandt Field Bishop
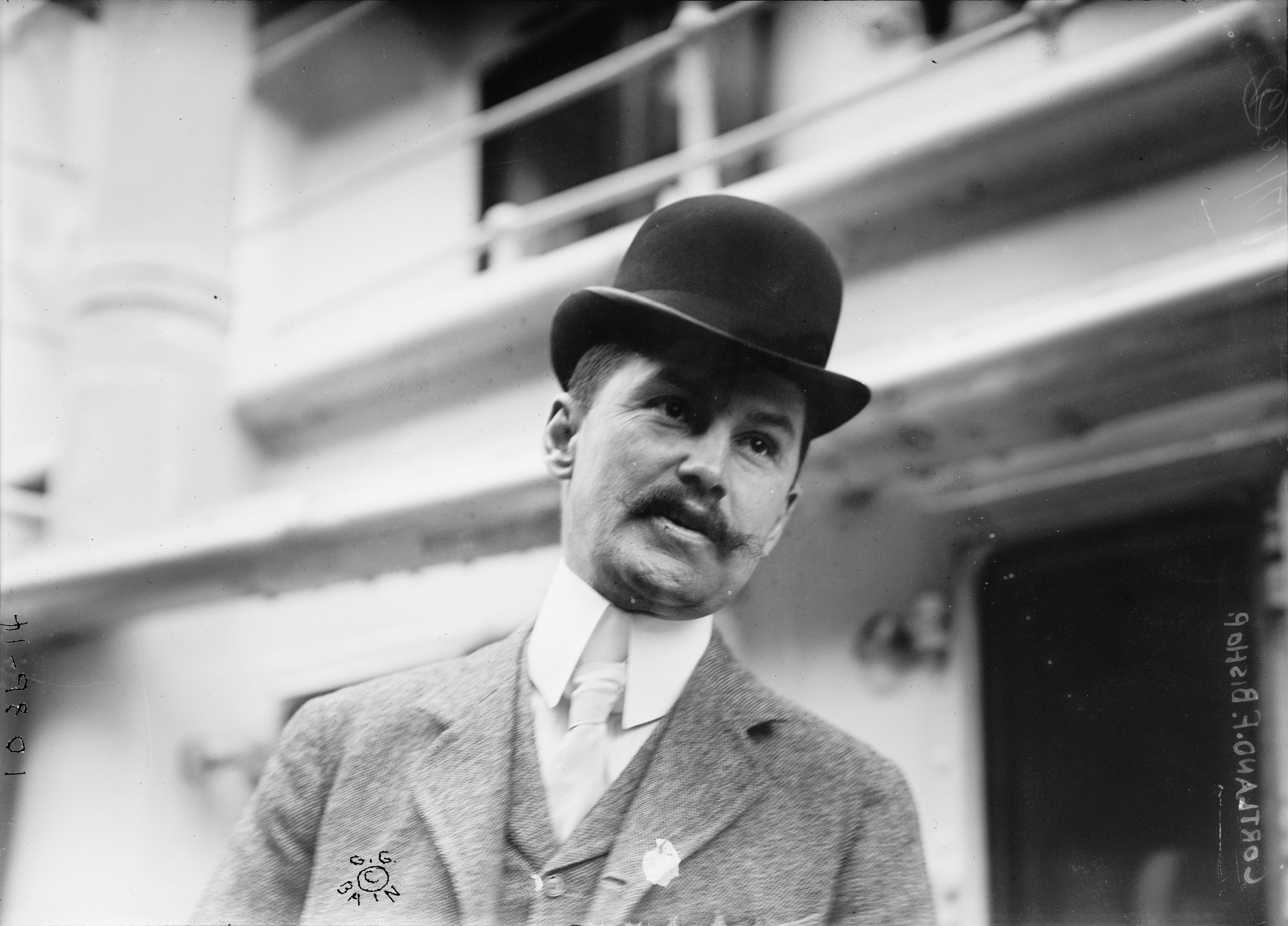
- Cortlandt F. Bishop circa 1900.
- Born: November 24, 1870; New York City
- Died: March 30, 1935 (aged 64); Lenox, Massachusetts
- Education: Columbia University
- Occupations: Aviator, book collector
- Spouse: Amy Bend (m. 1899–1935)
- Children: Beatrice Bishop Berle
- Parent(s): David Wolfe Bishop; Florence Van Corltandt Field
- Relatives: Benjamin Hazard Field (grandfather)

Cortlandt Field Bishop (November 24, 1870 – March 30, 1935) was an American pioneer aviator, balloonist, autoist, book collector, and traveler.

== Early life ==
He was born on November 24, 1870, to David Wolfe Bishop (1833–1900) and Florence Van Corltandt Field (1851–1922). His younger brother was David Wolfe Bishop Jr. His father inherited the greater part of the wealth of Catharine Lorillard Wolfe.

His maternal grandparents were Benjamin Hazard Field and Catharine Van Cortlandt de Peyster. His paternal grandparents were Japhet Bishop and Harriet Matilda Wolfe. After his father's death, his mother married John Edward Parsons, a distinguished lawyer in New York.

He earned an A.B. from Columbia University in 1891, an A.M. in 1892, a Ph.D. in 1893, and an LL.B. in 1894.

== Career ==
In 1893, he published a book on American colonial voting practices.

In July 1902, he gave automobile lessons to the Cottagers of Lenox and Pittsfield, Massachusetts, in response to criticism of the use of automobile. In 1903, Cortlandt and his brother, David, were hurt in an automobile accident where they collided with a carriage while David was driving. Cortlandt was bruised and sustained a bad wound on his cheek while David was battered and bruised, while the car suffered only minor damage.

In 1909, as president of the Aero Club of America, Bishop offered a $250 prize to the first four persons who could fly one kilometer. During the International Aviation Meet in 1910, Bishop, Charles K. Hamilton, and Anthony J. Drexel, Jr. were all separately arrested for speeding in Jamaica, Queens.

In 1911, Bishop and his wife took an extensive automobile trip around Europe, traveling to the Tripolitan frontier, 480 kilometers from Tunis.

=== American Art Association ===
In 1923, Bishop bought America's premier auction house, American Art Association, from Thomas Kirby and installed Maj. Hiram Haney Parke and Otto Bernet as vice presidents and then proceeded to run his business from all over the world. In 1929, The Association merged with the Anderson Galleries (formerly Anderson Auction Company) to form the American Art Association-Anderson Galleries, Inc. In August 1938, the firm was bought from Bishop's estate by Parke-Bernet Galleries, which had been formed a year earlier by Bishop's former auctioneers. In 1964, Sotheby's purchased Parke-Bernet, then the largest auctioneer of fine art in the United States.

=== Real estate ===
In 1903, he purchased land and the 1879 row house that occupied it at 15 East 67th Street in New York City for $235,000. He and his wife then hired noted architect, Ernest Flagg, who had designed the Singer Building and the Corcoran Gallery, to design their townhouse, which was built in 1904.

In 1907, after the death of Matilda W. White (née Bishop), his aunt and the widow of Joseph Moss White who some said was deranged, Bishop was named trustee of her estate, valued at $3,546,558. Through the will of his aunt, he was conveyed certain real estate properties which he managed under Cortlandt Bishop, Inc. In 1925, the company leased, from the estate of Frederick Heimsoth, the plot at the southwest corner of 56th Street and Sixth Avenue, giving him the entire block front from 55th to 56th on Sixth Avenue, upon which he planned to build a 15-story apartment building, which was completed in 1928.

In 1922, after the death of his mother, Bishop razed his parents home, Interlaken, in Lenox and built Ananda Hall, which was torn down in 1940.

In 1929, Bishop sold two five-story tenement buildings at 986 and 988 Sixth Avenue to Herrman Friedman, president of Sofmar Realty Corporation, that had been owned by the Bishop family for over 40 years. In 1933, Bishop gave himself, as surviving trustee, a $225,000 mortgage through Cortlandt Bishop, Inc. on 1305 6th Avenue. He also owned a three-story residence on East 35th Street which was bought in 1939 and torn down, together with 31-33 East Street, so a new Georgian structure could be built.

== Personal life ==
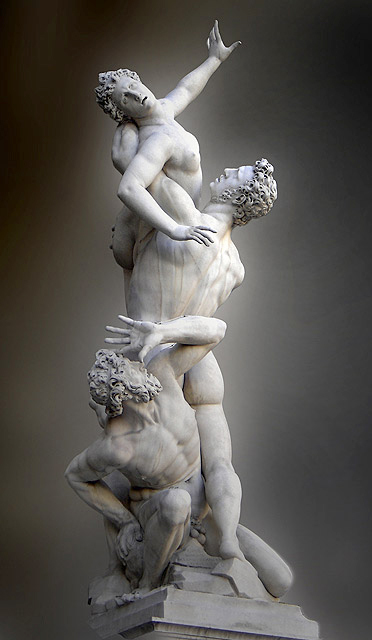
The Rape of the Sabine Women (1574–82), Florence

In 1899, Bishop married Amy Bend (1870-1957), sister of Beatrice Bend (1874-1941), who married Henry Prather Fletcher, both daughters of George H. Bend, a member of the New York Stock Exchange who had gone bankrupt. She was introduced into society in 1889 and was a close friend of Emily Vanderbilt Sloane. Amy was rumored to have been close to marrying John Jacob Astor IV, and later became engaged to A. Lanfear Norrie, which was announced at a grand ball on April 23, 1893, but which Amy broke off less than a month later. The broken engagement was followed by a brief courtship with William Kissam Vanderbilt, who at the time, was old enough to be her father. After their marriage, Cortlandt and Amy had one child:

- Beatrice Bishop Berle (1902–1993), an author and prominent doctor who married Adolf A. Berle, Jr. (1895–1971), a diplomat. After his death, she married Dr. André Frédéric Cournand (1895–1988), a physician who was awarded the Nobel Prize for medicine in 1956.

He died on March 30, 1935, in Lenox, Massachusetts. In his will, he left half of his fortune to his wife and half to his mistress with the stipulation that the two, whom had never before met, must live together in harmony until one of them died. After his death, the Bishop's New York townhouse was sold Anna Erickson, widow of the chairman of McCann-Erickson in 1936 and, today, is the home of the Regency Whist Club. His estate was valued at $2,847,201 with a net value of $499,392, which accounted for debts, mortgages, administrative expenses and a $515,000 payment to his daughter in settlement of an action she brought for an accounting of Bishop's trusteeship of a fund in which she had an interest. His principal beneficiary was his widow and a friend, Edith Nixon. Bishop was found to have improperly handled the estate of Matilda W. White, his aunt, who left an estate of $3,546,558.

=== Legacy ===
In November 1935, his auction house, American Art Association-Anderson Galleries, sold his paintings and furniture for $276,145. The sale included two Hoppner portraits, a half-length portrait of Miss Rich, a young woman in a white gown, and the painter's study of the 2nd Earl of Chichester, painted about 1795. It also included a portrait of Lady Cholmondeley by Sir Joshua Reynolds, six Aubusson tapestries, Giovanni Da Bologna's Rape of a Sabine, a sculptured marble bas-relief of the Virgin and Child by Bernardo Rossellino, a Chippendale carved walnut scroll-top chest, among others.

In 1938 and 1939, Bishop's extensive stamp and book collection was sold.

In 1940, the auction sale of furnishings of Ananda Hall, Bishop's Lenox estate took place, which resulted in the sale of six Chippendale carved mahogany side chairs, an Oushak medallion, a Louis XVI gold and enamel snuff box with miniature, a Spanish ten-doblas gold coin from 1398, a Venetian gold sixty-ducats coin, a World's Colombian Exposition gold medal of 1892, and a Hepplewhite inlaid mahogany sideboard.

== In popular culture ==
- Bishop features prominently in, The Elegant Auctioneers by Wesley Towner, Hill & Wang, ISBN 0809041715, (1970), a novel about how Bishop bought America's premier auction house, American Art Association, in 1923.
