= James M. Halsey =

James Mitchell Halsey (May 22, 1825 – March 22, 1899) was an American farmer, merchant, and politician from Bridgehampton, New York.

== Life ==
Halsey was born on May 22, 1825, in Bridgehampton, New York, the son of Judge Hugh Halsey and Phebe Mitchell. He was a descendant of Thomas Halsey. His father Hugh was judge of the county court and New York State Surveyor General.

Halsey received a common school education. He initially worked as a farmer, but in around 1862 he entered the mercantile business. He held several town offices and spent four years working in the New York Custom House. In 1867, he was elected to the New York State Assembly as a Democrat, representing Suffolk County. He served in the Assembly in 1868.

At one point, Halsey was in a partnership with Benjamin G. Eldredge under the firm name Halsey & Eldredge. The partnership was dissolved in 1870. He served as Supervisor of Southampton from 1878 to 1880. In 1886, he was appointed Postmaster of Bridgehampton.

In 1857, Halsey married Mary A. Wright, daughter of Dr. Levi D. Wright. Their children were Katherine P., Levi Wright, and Hugh.

Halsey died at home from apoplexy on March 22, 1899. He went out of the house that day to do some small duties, but when he was gone for too long his daughter searched for him and found him unconscious outside. He died shortly after he was brought home. He was buried in the old Bridgehampton Cemetery.

New York State Assembly
Preceded by Alfred Wagstaff Jr.	New York State Assembly; Suffolk County; 1868	Succeeded by William A. Conant
