= Benjamin Hazard Field =

American merchant and philanthropist (1814–1893)

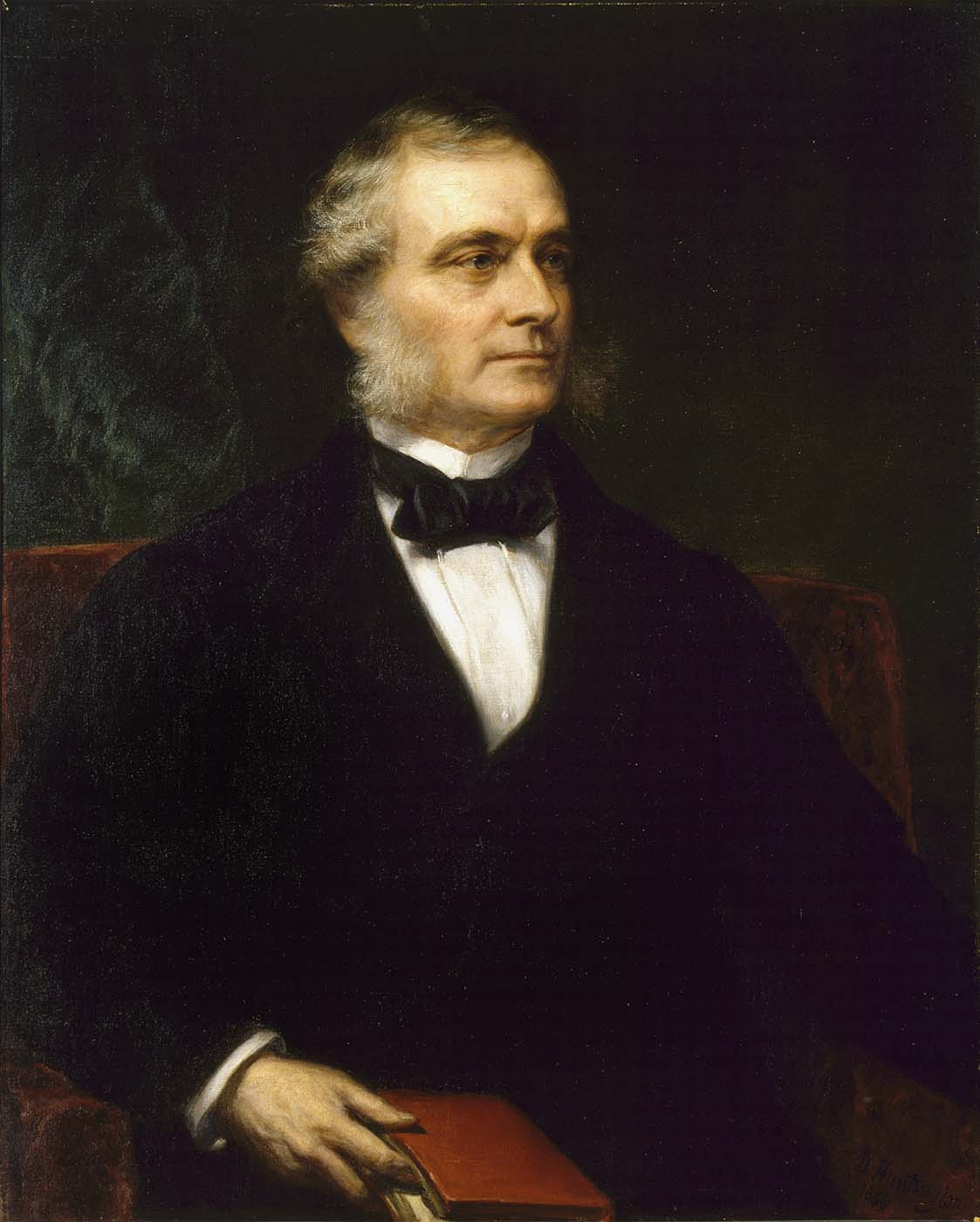
- Field, by Daniel Huntington, 1875

18th President of the Saint Nicholas Society of the City of New York
- In office 1870–1870
- Preceded by: James William Beekman
- Succeeded by: Richard Edwards Mount Jr.

Personal details
- Born: May 5, 1814 Yorktown, New York, U.S.
- Died: March 17, 1893 (aged 78) New York City, New York, U.S.
- Spouse: Catherine Matilda Van Cortlandt de Peyster (m. 1838; died 1886)
- Relations: Cortlandt F. Bishop (grandson)
- Children: 2
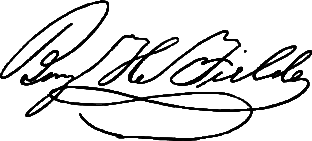
- Signature

Benjamin Hazard Field (May 2, 1814 – March 17, 1893) was an American merchant philanthropist.

== Early life ==
Field was born on May 2, 1814, at the Field home in Yorktown in Westchester County. He was one of three sons born to Hazard Field (1764–1845) and his second wife, Mary (née Bailey) Field (1780–1832), who married in 1806. His father was previously married to Frances "Fanny" Wright June.

His paternal grandparents were John Field and Lydia (née Hazard) Field, who had sixteen children, of which his father Hazard was the oldest.

== Career ==
After schooling in Westchester and at North Salem Academy, he moved to New York and entered the mercantile business of his uncle, Hickson W. Field (grandfather of Princess di Triggiano Brancaccio, lady in waiting to the Queen of Italy), at 170-176 John Street. At the age of 18, Field became a partner in 1832. After his uncle retired in 1838, Field assumed control of the entire business, rapidly gaining "both fortune and fame." Field eventually retired from the business, which his son Cortlandt joined in 1861, and renamed Cortlandt de P. Field & Co. in 1865. He fully retired from business in 1875.

In 1863, Field became vice-president of the New York Eye and Ear Infirmary, later serving as president in 1884. He was a founder of the New York Free Circulating Library and became involved with the New York Dispensary, the Roosevelt Hospital, the New York Institute for the Instruction of the Deaf and Dumb, and the Home for Incurables in the Bronx which Field helped found in 1866, serving as its first president. He was largely responsible for the Farragut Monument in Madison Square Park (an outdoor bronze sculpture of David Farragut by sculptor Augustus Saint-Gaudens on an exedra designed by architect Stanford White).

In 1870, he became the 16th President of the Saint Nicholas Society of the City of New York. Field was a member of the New-York Historical Society, serving as its treasurer, vice president, and president beginning in 1885.

== Personal life ==
On January 19, 1838, Field was married to Catherine Matilda Van Cortlandt de Peyster (1818–1886). Catherine was the daughter of Frederic de Peyster and Anne (née Beekman) de Peyster. She was the aunt of author and philanthropist John Watts de Peyster (through her brother Frederic de Peyster) and Frederic James de Peyster (through her brother James Ferguson De Peyster). Together, they lived on the northern edge of Madison Square Park at 21 East 26th Street and were the parents of:

- Cortlandt de Peyster Field (1839–1918), who married Virginia Hamersley (d. 1920), sister of J. Hooker Hamersley.
- Florence Van Cortlandt Field (1851–1922), who married David Wolfe Bishop (1833–1900), the inheritor of Catharine Lorillard Wolfe's wealth. After Bishop's death, she remarried to married John Edward Parsons, a distinguished lawyer in New York.

Field died on March 17, 1893, in New York City. After a funeral at Grace Church, he was buried at Green-Wood Cemetery in Brooklyn.

=== Descendants ===
Through his daughter Florence, he was the grandfather of Cortlandt Field Bishop, a pioneer aviator, balloonist, book collector, and traveler. and David Wolfe Bishop Jr.
