= James de Peyster Ogden =

American Businessman

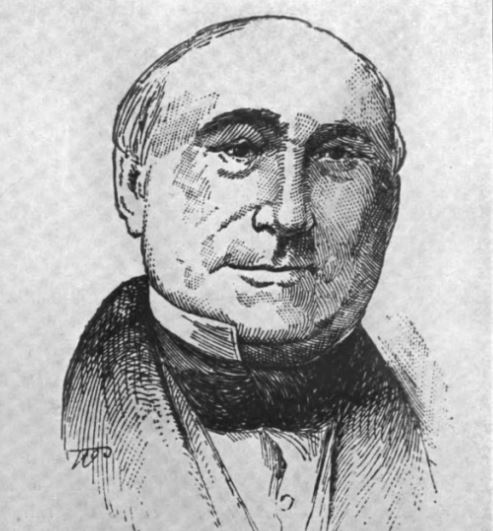

President of the Saint Nicholas Society of the City of New York
- In office 1856–1857
- Preceded by: Frederic De Peyster
- Succeeded by: Gulian Crommelin Verplanck
- In office 1850–1851
- Preceded by: John Alsop King
- Succeeded by: Ogden Hoffman

President of the New York Chamber of Commerce
- In office 1842–1845
- Preceded by: Isaac Carow
- Succeeded by: James Gore King

Personal details
- Born: August 26, 1790 New York City, U.S.
- Died: April 7, 1870 (aged 79) New York City, U.S.
- Spouse: Lavinia Beckwith
- Children: 3
- Parent(s): Jacob Ogden Jr. Mary Reade de Peyster

James de Peyster Ogden (August 26, 1790 – April 7, 1870) was an American merchant and businessman.

== Early life ==
Ogden was born in New York City on August 26, 1790, a scion of two well-known New York families. He was the only child of Dr. Jacob Ogden Jr. (1762–1802) and Mary Reade (née de Peyster) Ogden (1765–1790), who married in 1789. His mother died a few months after his birth and his father, who was a friend of George Washington had studied medicine alongside David Hosack when both were students of Samuel Bard.

== Career ==
Orphaned at age 11, he was adopted by a de Peyster aunt, who died shortly thereafter, and then he went to live with his uncle, Frederick de Peyster. Ogden then began his business career as a clerk with Van Horne and Clarkson, a mercantile firm in New York City, and then spent several years in Liverpool, England as an agent for LeRoy, Bayard and Company, another mercantile firm. During the administration of President Andrew Jackson, he held the post of U.S. consul for Liverpool.

Ogden served as the first president of the Atlantic Dock Company, chartered by New York State on May 6, 1840. The company developed the Brooklyn harbor by erecting a docks, warehouses, and a basin for deep water ships which today is known as Red Hook and South Brooklyn.

In 1845, he began his three year tenure as the first president of Nautilus Insurance Company (today known as New York Life), which had also been chartered in 1840. The company sold life, fire, and marine insurance, as well as insuring the lives of slaves for their owners (although the company voted to end the sale of insurance policies on slaves in 1848).

Reportedly, he "deeply deplored the Civil War, and his sympathies were very strong with the South; yet he recognized the duty of opposing secession and exerted all his powers against it."

He was a member and president of the Saint Nicholas Society of the City of New York, an organization of men who are descended from early inhabitants of the State of New York, serving from 1850 to 1851, and again from 1856 to 1857. He was also a founding member of the New York Chamber of Commerce, of which he served as president of from 1842 to 1845.

== Personal life ==
Ogden was married to Lavinia Beckwith. Together, they were the parents of three children, two sons and a daughter, namely Charles Richard Ogden (1840–1882), who married Bessie A. Jerome (d. 1918); James Ogden; and Mary Elizabeth Ogden, who married George Hyatt.

Ogden died on April 7, 1870. His funeral was held at Trinity Church and he was buried at Green-Wood Cemetery in Brooklyn, New York.
