= Alfred Wagstaff Jr. =

American politician (1844–1921)

Alfred Wagstaff
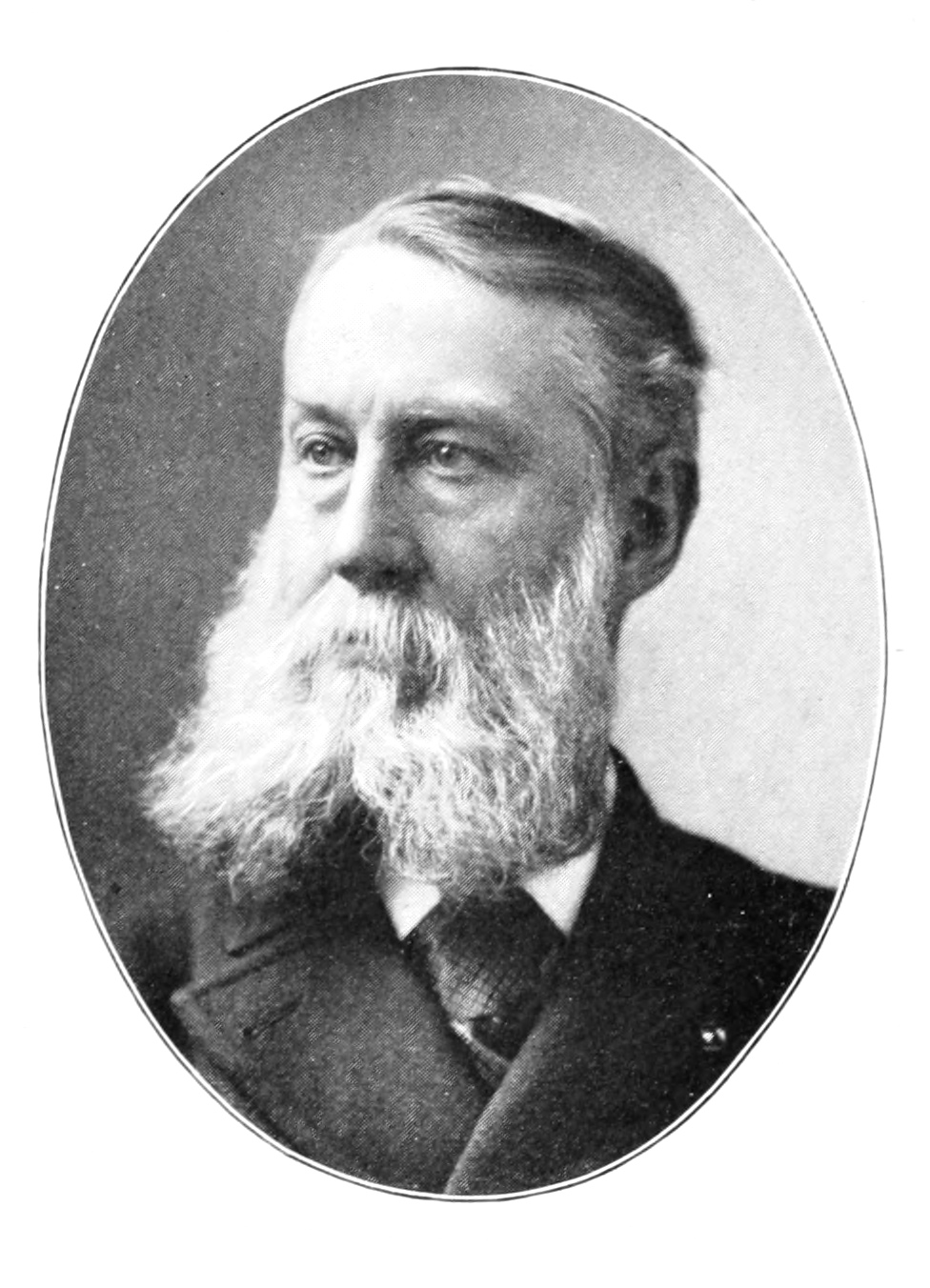

President of the American Society for the Prevention of Cruelty to Animals
- In office 1906–1921
- Preceded by: John Peter Haines

Member of the New York State Senate from the 5th District
- In office January 1, 1877 – December 31, 1879
- Preceded by: James W. Booth
- Succeeded by: Edward Hogan

Member of the New York State Assembly
- In office January 1, 1874 – December 31, 1874
- Preceded by: George W. Clarke
- Succeeded by: Frederick W. Seward
- In office January 1, 1867 – December 31, 1867
- Preceded by: James H. Tuthill; Richard A. Udall
- Succeeded by: James M. Halsey

Personal details
- Born: March 21, 1844 New York City, US
- Died: November 2, 1921 (aged 77) Babylon, New York, US
- Party: Republican; Liberal Republican; Democratic
- Spouse: Mary A. Barnard (m. 1880)
- Relations: Sam Wagstaff (grandson); Henry A. DuBois (cousin)
- Children: 5
- Parent(s): Alfred Wagstaff Sr. Sarah Platt DuBois Wagstaff
- Education: Columbia Law School (1866)

Alfred Wagstaff Jr. (March 21, 1844 – October 2, 1921) was an American lawyer and politician from New York. He was president of the American Society for the Prevention of Cruelty to Animals from 1906 until his death in 1921.

== Early life ==
Wagstaff was born on March 21, 1844, at 27 Waverly Place in New York City. He was the son of Sarah Platt (née DuBois) Wagstaff and Dr. Alfred Wagstaff Sr., a physician in New York City, who "was the largest landowner on Long Island until the Vanderbilts."

His paternal grandfather was David Wagstaff, an English immigrant who made a fortune as a notable merchant. His maternal grandparents were Cornelius DuBois and Sarah Platt (née Ogden) DuBois. Through his maternal grandmother, he was descended from Robert Ogden, a lawyer who worked in New Jersey and New York, and served as quartermaster during the Revolutionary War. Among his extended DuBois family were cousins, Eugene Floyd DuBois and Dr. Henry Augustus DuBois (grandson of Peter Augustus Jay), and uncle Cornelius DuBois, who married Mary Ann Delafield DuBois (a niece of Richard Delafield and cousin of Dr. Francis Delafield).

== Career ==
In 1863, then only 19 years old, he was commissioned as a colonel of the 16th Reg. of the New York National Guard. Wagstaff served during the New York Draft Riots in Brooklyn. In 1864, his regiment was transferred to the Union Army and stationed at Staten Island. In November 1864, he was commissioned a first lieutenant of the 91st New York Veteran Volunteers, and was detailed to the staff of Gen. William Walton Morris.

In February 1865, he was promoted to major, served as chief of staff of General Samuel W. Crawford with the Army of the Potomac until the end of the war, and was brevetted as a lieutenant colonel.

=== Legal and political career ===
After graduating LL.B. from Columbia Law School in 1866, Wagstaff was admitted to the bar, practiced in New York City, and resided in West Islip. He joined the New York City Bar Association. He became a member of the law firm of Gardiner, Ward & Wagstaff, which later was known as North, Ward & Wagstaff.

From 1867 to 1869, he was Colonel and A.D.C. on the staff of Reuben Fenton, the Governor of New York.

In 1867, he was elected as a Republican member of the New York State Assembly, representing Suffolk County, serving in the 90th New York State Legislature. He was a delegate to the 1868 Republican National Convention. In 1872, he joined the Liberal Republican Party, and supported Horace Greeley for president.

Afterwards Wagstaff became a Democratic and in 1874, was again elected a member of the State Assembly, however, this time he represented the 7th district, New York Co., serving in the 97th New York State Legislature. From January 1, 1877, to December 31, 1879, he was a member of the New York State Senate, representing the 5th District, sitting in the 100th, 101st and 102nd New York State Legislatures.

From 1896 until his death, he was the Clerk of the Appellate Division of the Supreme Court, First Judicial Department.

From 1906 until his death, he served as the president of the American Society for the Prevention of Cruelty to Animals. In 1920, he began his two term service as the 48th President of the Saint Nicholas Society of the City of New York, a charitable organization in New York City of men who are descended from early inhabitants of the State of New York. Wagstaff also served as Fourth Vice-president in 1914, Third Vice-president in 1915, Second Vice-president from 1916 to 1917, First Vice-president from 1918 to 1919.

== Personal life ==
On March 30, 1880, he married Mary Anderson Barnard (1860–1938). Mary was the daughter of Fannie (née Anderson) Barnard and George Gardner Barnard, the former Recorder of New York City. Together, they were the parents of five children, including:

- Alfred Wagstaff III (1881–1930), who married Blanche LeRoy Shoemaker (1886–1967), sister of Henry W. Shoemaker, in 1907. They divorced and she remarried to Donald Carr.
- David Wagstaff (1882–1951), a Harvard graduate who was a member of Dominick & Dominick and who married Isabelle Tilford (1887–1956), daughter of Henry Morgan Tilford.
- Samuel Jones Wagstaff (1885–1975), who married Pauline Leroy French (1886–1964), daughter of Amos Tuck French, in 1908. They divorced in 1920, and in December 1920, he married Polish émigré Olga May (née Piorkowska) Thomas and in March 1921, she married Donald Oliver MacRae. They also divorced, and in 1933 he married Cornelia Scranton (1896–1976), a daughter of Walter Scranton (president of the Lackawanna Steel Company) and niece of William Walker Scranton.
- George Barnard Wagstaff (b. 1886), who married Mary Cutting Cumnock, sister of Arthur Cumnock in 1914. They divorced and he remarried to Dorothy Frothingham, a daughter of Charles F. Frothingham. They also divorced and he remarried to Lilian Hyde Feitner (widow of Quentin Field Feitner) in 1940.
- Margaret Barnard Wagstaff, who married Harold Edgar Logan. She later married Arthur Perkins.

Wagstaff died on October 2, 1921, at his home, "Tahlulah", in Babylon, New York, at age 77 from "a combination of ailments due to his age".

=== Descendants ===
Through his son Samuel, he was the grandfather of Samuel Jones Wagstaff Jr., a prominent art curator and collector who was in a fifteen-year relationship with photographer Robert Mapplethorpe.

New York State Assembly
Preceded by James H. Tuthill (1st D.); Richard A. Udall (2nd D.)	New York State Assembly; Suffolk County; 1867	Succeeded by James M. Halsey
Preceded by George W. Clarke	New York State Assembly; New York County, 7th District; 1874	Succeeded by Frederick W. Seward
New York State Senate
Preceded by James W. Booth	New York State Senate; 5th District; 1877–1879	Succeeded by Edward Hogan
