= Saint Nicholas Society of the City of New York =

American organization

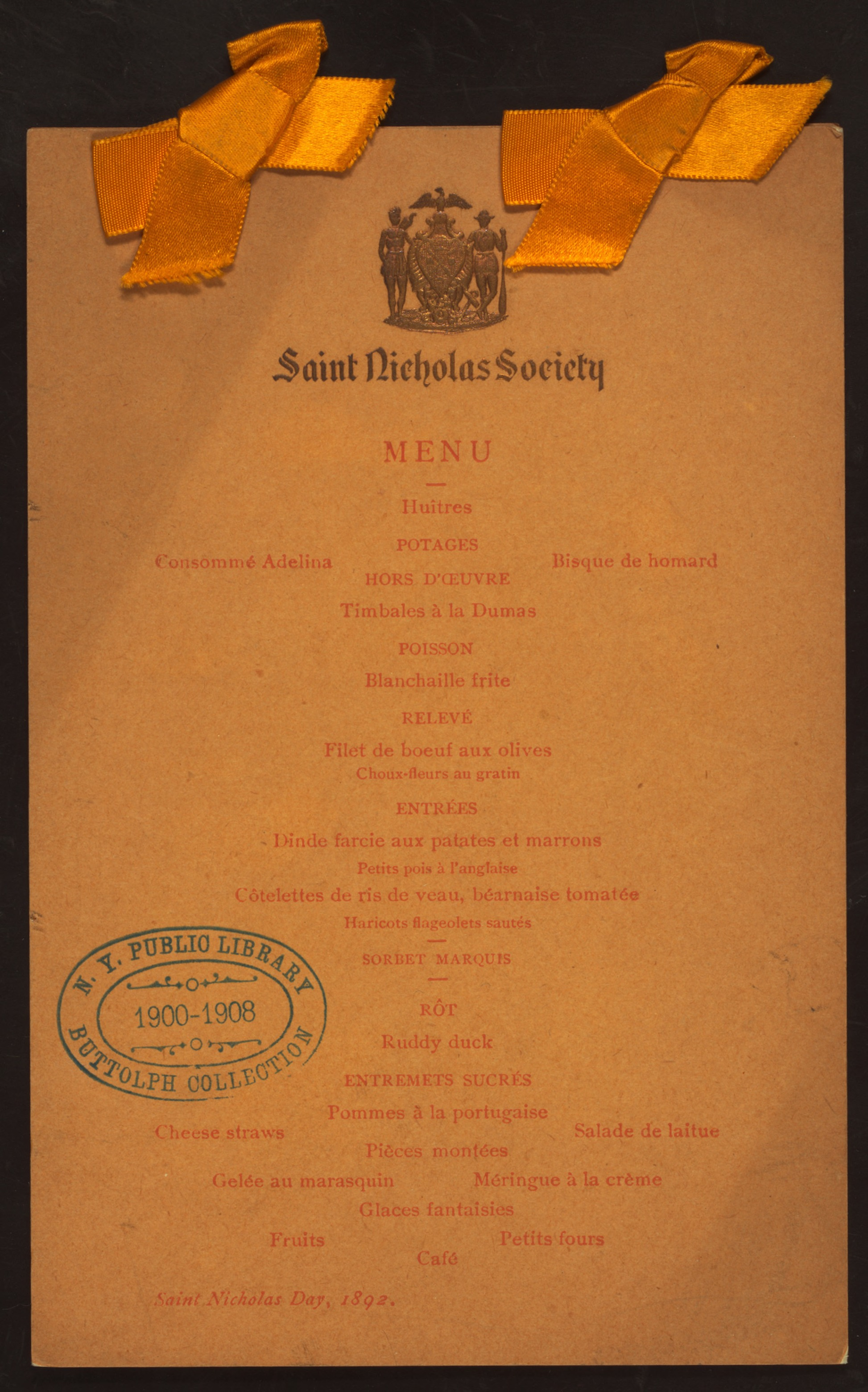
- Saint Nicholas Day event held in 1892 by the Saint Nicholas Day Society in 1892
- Formation: 1835
- Type: Charity
- Tax ID no.: on file
- Headquarters: 150 East 55th Street
- Location: New York City
- Website: www.saintnicholassociety.org

The Saint Nicholas Society of the City of New York is a charitable organization in New York City of men who are descended from early inhabitants of the State of New York. Thomas S Johnson is the current president. The organization preserves historical and genealogical records of English-ruled New York and Dutch-ruled New Amsterdam. The society has helped preserve the oldest historically landmarked buildings in New York City. The Society is financing the digitization of its colonial historical archives to be made publicly available at the New-York Historical Society.

== History ==
Washington Irving, with the financial backing of John Jacob Astor and other prominent New Yorkers, organized the society in 1835 for historical and social purposes, holding its first meeting at Washington Hall.

The group continues to hold regular dinners and meetings and to pay for newspaper announcements when one of their members dies. The annual dinner is usually addressed by notable speakers, with reports of speeches appearing in The New York Times. The Society has held a spring dinner every year since 1848.

Notable speakers over the years include Mark Twain, Theodore Roosevelt, Henry Kissinger, John D. Rockefeller Jr., Mayor Fiorello LaGuardia, Mayor John Lindsay, Brooke Astor, David Rockefeller and Governor Thomas Kean.

In 1900, Mark Twain was an honored guest, he said "I find great improvement of the City of New York, some say it has improved because I have been away, Others and I agree with them, say it has improved because I have come back!" In 1852, Senator and Secretary of State Daniel Webster said, "Gentlemen, I deem it a great good fortune to pass a few minutes with you", "I am happy to be here", "I have raised my voice and swung my hat for forty years for Orange Boven."

The Paas Ball includes a presentation of Debutantes. The St Nicholas Society is part of a committee of organizations and governments planning to celebrate the 400th Anniversary of New Amsterdam settlement and the founding of the City that became New York.

== Governance ==
The Society has several officers including president, four vice presidents, secretary, treasurer, historian, genealogist, assistant genealogist, chaplains, and physicians. Members are appointed to a Board of Managers annually, and have three members for each Class or year who serve between a one and a five-year term.

== Membership ==
Members are men descended from men who lived in the State of New York prior to 1785.

The colors of the society are orange and blue, symbolic of the Dutch settlement of New York.

== Notable members, speakers and award winners ==
Speakers and award winners – Governors, Mayors, Presidents, Authors, and Philanthropists.

- Mark Twain, author
- Daniel Webster, U.S. Senator and Secretary of State
- Theodore Roosevelt, President of the United States
- Henry Kissinger, U.S. Secretary of State
- John D. Rockefeller Jr., philanthropist
- Fiorello LaGuardia, mayor of New York City
- John Lindsay, mayor of New York City
- Brooke Astor, philanthropist
- William S. Paley, founder of CBS
- Walter Cronkite, broadcaster
- Tom Wolfe, author
- David Rockefeller, philanthropist
- Thomas Watson Jr., philanthropist
- Thomas Kean, governor
- Steven Ujifusa, historian
- David McCollough, author 2020
- Julian Fellowes, author, actor, producer, British Lord, screenwriter. 2022.

Society members, past and present, include:

- John Jacob Astor, was also instrumental in the founding of the society
- Richmond P. Davis, US Army major general
- Chauncey Depew, United States Senator
- Hamilton Fish, Secretary of State
- Washington Irving, writer and founder of the Saint Nicholas Society of the City of New York
- George Goelet Kip
- Pierre Lorillard IV
- Theodore Roosevelt, President of the United States
- William Watts Sherman, banker and socialite
- Peter Gerard Stuyvesant, first president was the 2nd largest landowner in NYC. He owned the 60 acre Bowery family Stuyvesant farm which he developed into residential housing from Houston Street to 23rd Street
- Cornelius Vanderbilt II, president of the Society, owner of the New York Central Railroad and The Breakers
- George Roe Van De Water
- David Van Nostrand

Medal of Merit Winners by Year

- 1937 The Hon. Robert Moses
- 1938 The Hon. Thomas Dewey
- 1939 Archer Milton Huntington
- 1940 Senator Winthrop Aldrich
- 1941 William Church Osborn
- 1942 Col. Arthur McDermott
- 1943 General Hugh Drum
- 1944 The Hon. Lee Smith
- 1945 Mayor Fiorello Laguardia
- 1946 The Hon. Herbert L. Satterlee
- 1947 John D. Rockefeller Jr.
- 1948 The Hon. George McAnemy
- 1949 Judge Learned Hand
- 1950 Fairfield Osborn
- 1951 The Hon. Frank Hogan
- 1952 Howard Cullman
- 1953 Frederick Ecker
- 1954 Alfred Sloan
- 1955 Clarence Michalis
- 1956 David Rockefeller
- 1957 Hon Myron Taylor
- 1958 Jerimiah Milbank
- 1959 Robert Dowling
- 1960 Cleveland E. Dodge Jr
- 1961 Lee Wood
- 1962 Hon Edward Lumbard
- 1963 James Rorimer
- 1964 Michael Murphy
- 1965 Whitney North Seymour
- 1966 Reginald Townsend
- 1967 James McNaughton Hester
- 1968 Mayor John Lindsay
- 1969 Hoyt Ammidon
- 1970 Hon Bernard Botein
- 1971 Helen Hayes
- 1972 The Rev. Horace Donegan
- 1973 Joseph Papp
- 1974 The Hon. Francis Plimpton
- 1975 Secretary Treasury Douglas Dillon
- 1976 Dr William McGill
- 1977 John DeButts
- 1978 Thomas Murphy
- 1979 Walter Hoving
- 1980 Vincent Sardi Jr
- 1981 The Rev. Norman Vincent Peale
- 1982 Dr Henry Kissinger
- 1983 Maestro James Levine
- 1984 Hon Jeane Kirkpatrick
- 1985 Washington Irving (posthumous)
- 1986 Douglas Fairbanks Jr.
- 1987 Brooke Astor
- 1988 Thomas Watson Jr.
- 1989 Hugh Bullock
- 1990 The Rev. David Read
- 1991 Daniel Davison
- 1992 The Rev. Hugh Hildesley
- 1993 Walter Cronkite
- 1995 John Elliott Jr
- 1996 Kenneth Jackson
- 1997 The Rev. Thomas Pike
- 1998 Henry Luce III
- 1999 Schuler Chapin
- 2000 Henry Stern
- 2002 Eleanor Thomas Elliott
- 2003 William F Baker
- 2004 Vartan Gregorian
- 2005 Mirian Heiskell
- 2006 Hon William Vanden Heuvel
- 2007 E L Doctorow
- 2008 Hope Preminger
- 2009 John L Loeb Jr.
- 2010 The Rev. James Cooper
- 2012 The Hon. Thomas Kean
- 2013 Phillipe de Montebello
- 2014 Gregory Long
- 2015 Dr Barbaralee Diamonstein-Spielvogel
- 2016 Dr Louise Mirrer
- 2017 Casey Kemper
- 2018 Adele Chatfield-Taylor
- 2019 Ian Wardropper
- 2021 Colin Powell
- 2022 Henry Louis Gates
