= Haut-Brion =

Haut-Brion is a name found in several Bordeaux wine producers in the Graves district, including:

- Château Haut-Brion, a premier cru selection of the 1855 classification then named simply Haut-Brion
- Château Laville Haut-Brion, a grand cru of the Graves classification
- Château La Mission Haut-Brion, a grand cru of the Graves classification
- Château La Tour Haut-Brion, formerly a grand cru, now discontinued
- Château Les Carmes Haut-Brion, an unclassed Pessac-Léognan estate
- Château Larrivet-Haut-Brion, an unclassed Pessac-Léognan estate
