= Joan Dillon =

- Princess Charles of Luxembourg; Dowager Duchess of Mouchy; Dowager Princess de Poix
- Born: 31 January 1935 (age 91); New York City, New York, U.S.
- Spouse: James Brady Moseley (m. 1953; ann. 1963) Prince Charles of Luxembourg (m. 1967; died 1977) Philippe de Noailles, 8th Duke of Mouchy (m. 1978; died 2011)
- Issue: Joan Moseley; Princess Charlotte, Mrs. Cunningham; Prince Robert of Luxembourg
- Father: C. Douglas Dillon
- Mother: Phyllis Chess Ellsworth

Joan de Noailles, Dowager Duchess of Mouchy (née Joan Douglas Dillon, later Princess Charles of Luxembourg; born 31 January 1935) is an American-born and French duchess, the first commoner to marry into the reigning dynasty of Luxembourg, and is the former president of French Bordeaux wine company Domaine Clarence Dillon.

== Biography ==
Joan Dillon is the daughter of U.S. Treasury Secretary C. Douglas Dillon and his wife, Phyllis Chess Ellsworth. She came to live in Paris, France, with her family when her father was appointed American Ambassador in the 1950s. She initially found work with the Paris Review.

After her marriage to Prince Charles of Luxembourg she discovered an interest in wine and the family interest in Haut-Brion. From 1975 to 2008, Joan Dillon held the presidency of Domaine Clarence Dillon.

Her third husband, Philippe de Noailles, 8th Duke of Mouchy, was general manager. Under their direction the company bought Château La Mission Haut-Brion, Château Laville Haut-Brion and Château La Tour Haut-Brion in 1983.

In 2008, Prince Robert of Luxembourg, her son by her marriage to Prince Charles of Luxembourg, became president of Domaine Clarence Dillon. Wine Enthusiast Magazine describes Dillon as "a larger-than-life lady, with an indefinable, cultured, mid-Atlantic accent."

== Family ==
Joan Douglas Dillon was married three times:

- Dillon married firstly in Paris, France, on 1 August 1953 James Brady Moseley, great-grandson of industrialist Anthony N. Brady, grandnephew of philanthropist Nicholas Frederic Brady and first cousin of U.S. Treasury Secretary Nicholas F. Brady. She converted to Catholicism accordingly. The couple divorced in Washoe County, Nevada, US, on 12 December 1955; the marriage was annulled in Rome, Italy, on 22 June 1963. They had a daughter, Joan Dillon Moseley Bryan Frost (born 1954).
- Dillon married secondly on 1 March 1967 Prince Charles, brother of Grand Duke Jean of Luxembourg, at the Catholic Church of St. Edward the Confessor in Sutton Park, Surrey, UK. The marriage was the first authorized of a Luxembourgeois prince to a commoner – authorized by Grand Ducal decree issued 16 February 1967. She was styled "Her Royal Highness Princess Joan of Luxembourg". Prince Charles died in Imbarcati, Province of Pistoia, Italy, on 26 July 1977. They had two children:
  - Princess Charlotte of Luxembourg (born 15 September 1967, New York City). She married on 26 June 1993 Marc Victor Cunningham (born 24 September 1965, Harrogate)
  - Prince Robert of Luxembourg (born 14 August 1968, Fischbach Castle, Luxembourg)
- Dillon married thirdly on 3 August 1978 Philippe de Noailles, 8th Duke of Mouchy (1922–2011), son of Henri de Noailles, 7th Duke of Mouchy (1890–1947) in Islesboro, Maine. The marriage was without issue.
