= Prince Robert of Luxembourg =

Luxembourgish prince (born 1968)

Prince Robert
- Born: 14 August 1968 (age 58); Fischbach Castle, Luxembourg
- Spouse: Julie Ongaro (m. 1994)
- Issue: Princess Charlotte of Nassau; Prince Alexandre of Nassau; Prince Frederik of Nassau
Names
- Robert Louis François Marie
- House: Nassau-Weilburg (official); Bourbon-Parma (agnatic)
- Father: Prince Charles of Luxembourg
- Mother: Joan Dillon

Prince Robert of Luxembourg, Prince of Bourbon-Parma, Prince of Nassau (Robert Louis François Marie; born 14 August 1968) is a member of the Grand Ducal Family of Luxembourg. He is a paternal first cousin of Grand Duke Henri of Luxembourg.

He is currently the president of Domaine Clarence Dillon, the French wine company founded by his maternal great-grandfather, Clarence Dillon. As of October 2025, Prince Robert is 15th in the line of succession to the Luxembourgish throne.

== Early life and family ==
Born on 14 August 1968 at Fischbach Castle, Luxembourg, he is the second child and only son of Prince Charles of Luxembourg, second son of Charlotte, Grand Duchess of Luxembourg, and Prince Felix of Bourbon-Parma, and his American-born wife, Joan Douglas Dillon, second daughter of politician and diplomat C. Douglas Dillon. He has one older half-sister from his mother's previous marriage and one older sister, Princess Charlotte (born 15 September 1967). Robert and his sister were raised at Fischbach Castle, which was then the home of his paternal grandparents. Their mother is a Catholic convert, having done so in 1953.

Robert was educated first at a primary school in Belair before attending Worth School, a Catholic boarding school near Worth, West Sussex, United Kingdom. He studied philosophy and psychology at Georgetown University but left university before graduating to travel through the Middle East and North Africa, India, Nepal, and South America.

On 29 January 1994, Robert married Julie Elizabeth Houston Ongaro in Boston, Massachusetts. She is the daughter of urologist and Harvard professor Dr. Theodore Ongaro and wife Katherine Houston. They have three children:

- Princess Charlotte Katherine Justine Marie of Nassau (born 20 March 1995), who married Nicolas Frederic Shakarchi (born 1997), son of Marwan Mahmoud Shakarchi and Tatiana Frick, civilly, in Gstaad on 11 February 2025, and, religiously, at Santa Maria dello Spasimo on 24 May 2025.
- Prince Alexandre Théodore Charles Marie of Nassau (born 18 April 1997)
- Prince Frederik Henri Douglas Marie of Nassau (18 March 2002 – 1 March 2025)

As their marriage was non-dynastically approved, his wife was initially known only as "Julie de Nassau" and their children initially bore the titles "Count/Countess of Nassau". On 27 November 2004, Grand Duke Henri issued an Arrêté grand-ducal upgrading his wife and their issue to the titles of "Prince/Princess of Nassau" with the style of Royal Highness.

Robert's youngest son Frederik died in Paris on 1 March 2025 from POLG congenital mitochondrial disease. He had been diagnosed with the disease when he was 14.

== Career ==
In 1992, Robert and his future wife wrote a screenplay based on Don Juan. This caught the eye of Steven Spielberg and Creative Artists Agency. He left screenwriting to join the family wine business.

In 1993, Robert joined the board of directors of Domaine Clarence Dillon, the French wine company founded by his maternal great-grandfather, Clarence Dillon, which owns some of the most worldwide prestigious estates including Château Haut-Brion, Château La Mission Haut-Brion and Château Quintus. In 2002, he became general manager. He succeeded his mother, the Duchess of Mouchy and Poix, as president in 2008.

As president, Robert has overseen the creation of one of the largest Saint-Émilion estates and the opening of Restaurant Le Clarence, a two Michelin star restaurant in the 8th arrondissement of Paris, in 2015. In 2018, Robert and Domaine Clarence Dillon joined the Primum Familiae Vini, an association of family-owned wineries with membership limited to twelve families.

== Honours ==
- Knight Grand Cross of the Order of Adolphe of Nassau (since birth; 14 August 1968)

Prince Robert of Luxembourg House of Luxembourg-Nassau Born: 14 August 1968
Lines of succession
| Preceded by Prince Jean of Nassau | Succession to the Luxembourger throne 15th in line | Succeeded by Prince Alexandre of Nassau |
