= Château Les Carmes Haut-Brion =

Bordeaux wine estate in Graves, France

Château les Carmes Haut-Brion
- Location: 20 rue des Carmes, Bordeaux, France
- Appellation: Pessac-Léognan
- Key people: Jean de Pontac, Léon Colin, Patrice Pichet
- Acres cultivated: 86
- Cases/yr: 30000 bottles
- Known for: Château les Carmes Haut-Brion, Le C des Carmes Haut-Brion
- Varietals: cabernet franc, cabernet sauvignon, merlot, petit verdot
- Website: les-carmes-haut-brion.com

Château Les Carmes Haut-Brion is a Bordeaux wine estate located in the AOC Pessac-Léognan within the region of Graves.

In addition to producing a red grand vin named Château Les Carmes Haut-Brion, the estate produces the red second wine Le Clos des Carmes.

== History ==
The property shares its origins with châteaux Haut-Brion, La Mission Haut-Brion, Laville Haut-Brion and La Tour Haut-Brion, in once being part of the Haut-Brion estate that belonged to Jean de Pontac. Reportedly at age 101, De Pontac donated land holding a water mill and vineyards to the Carmelite order, who tended the property from 1584 until the French Revolution. During this period the estate took the name Les Carmes Haut-Brion.

After the Revolution, it was confiscated and sold at auction to Léon Colin, whose descendant lineage maintained ownership of the estate into the 21st century with the Chantecaille-Furt family. In November 2010, Didier Chantecaille-Furt and his daughter Penelope sold Les Carmes Haut-Brion to real estate executive Patrice Pichet for €18m, reported to be a "record price".

The estate employs Stéphane Derenoncourt as consultant oenologist. Thierry Rustmann, former co-owner of Château Talbot, took over the running of the estate following the sale.

== Production ==
The estate has 4.7 hectares (12 acres) under vine, with a grape variety distribution of 50% Merlot, 40% Cabernet Franc and 10% Cabernet Sauvignon.

The annual production of the red grand vin Chateau Les Carmes Haut-Brion is approximately 1,800 cases (160 hL), and of the second wine Le Clos des Carmes there is a production of 200 cases (18 hL).
