= Woltner =

Woltner may refer to:

- The Woltner family, owners and managers of Château La Mission Haut-Brion, 1919–1983
- Chateau Woltner, a California winery, 1980–2000
