= Cheryl D. Miller =

American graphic designer (born 1952)

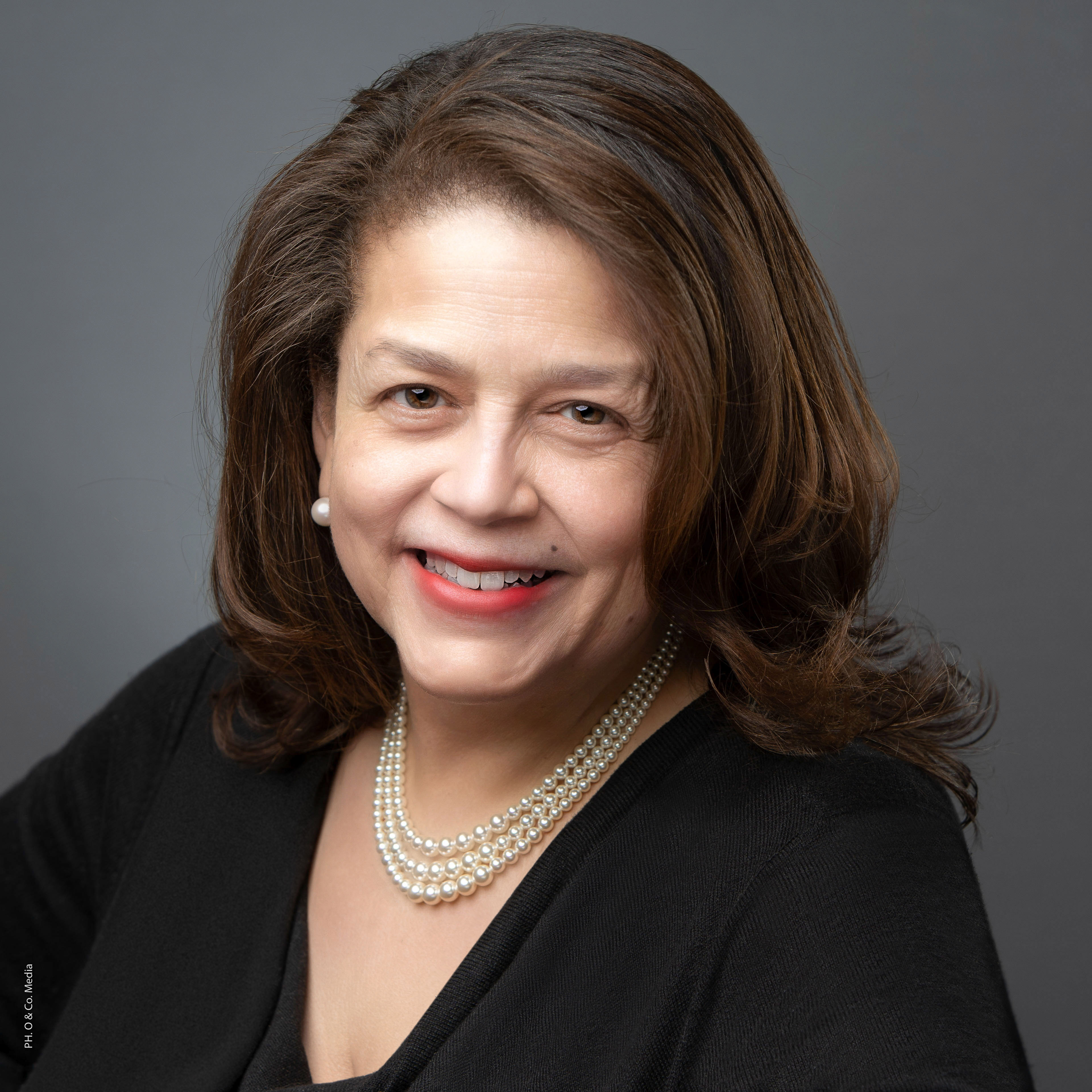
- Cheryl D. Miller in 2021
- Born: Cheryl D. Holmes; 1952 (age 73–74); Washington, D.C., United States
- Other name: CD Holmes Miller
- Education: Maryland Institute College of Art (BFA); Pratt Institute (MS); Union Theological Seminary (MDiv)
- Occupations: Writer theologian; graphic designer; decolonizing historian; decolonial artists
- Known for: Decolonization of graphic design
- Notable work: Transcending the Problems of the Black Designer to Success in the Marketplace (1985); Black Designers Missing in Action (1987) "Black Designers: Forward in Action, Pt. 1-4" (2020); HERE: Where the Black Designers Are (2024); Decolonizing Graphic Design from a Black Perspective (2025)
- Awards: AIGA Medalist "Expanding Access" 2021; Cooper Hewitt "Design Visionary" 2021; Honorary IBM Design Scholar “Eminent Luminary” 2021; The One Club Hall of Fame Inductee 2022; Steve Heller Prize for Cultural Commentary 2025
- Website: www.cdholmesmiller.com

Cheryl D. Holmes Miller (born 1952) is an American graphic designer, Christian minister, writer, artist, theologian, and decolonizing historian. She is known for her contributions to racial and gender equality in the graphic design field, and establishing one of the first black-women-owned design firms in New York City in 1984.

== Early life and education ==
Miller is of African-American and Philippine American ancestry. Her paternal family is from Washington, D.C., and her maternal family is Filipino Creole from the U.S. Virgin Islands. Miller's grandmother was an indigenous Danish West Indian and Ghanaian. Her great-great-grandmother is of Ghanaian descent from St. Johns. Her Philippine grandfather was part of the U.S. Filipino navy as a steward's cook during World War I in 1917. Her grandparents met and married at the USO. Her mother, a Filipino-Creole, came to the United States to attend Howard University. Her maternal Afro-Caribbean Saint-Tomian cousin Larry was installed as a chief of their tribe. Her paternal grandfather was white, and American Indian with Patriotic daughters of American Revolution DNA.

Miller graduated from Calvin Coolidge High School. She attended the Rhode Island School of Design, but when Miller's father died in her second year, she transferred to Maryland Institute College of Art (MICA), where she lived closer to her mother. She earned her BFA degree from MICA.

In 1985, she received a Master of Science degree in visual communications at the Pratt Institute. As a thesis project, she was asked to make a contribution to the field of graphic design but instead of a visual design project, she wrote "Transcending the Problems of the Black Designer to Success in the Marketplace" as her thesis, exploring design, sociology and history to give a portrait of African American job prospects.

Miller was awarded a Doctor of Humane Letters from the Vermont College of Fine Arts in February 2021; and a Doctor of Fine Arts in May 2022 from Maryland Institute College of Art; Doctor of Fine Arts in June 2022 from the Rhode Island School of Design; and an honorary Doctorate in Fine Arts in May 2023 from Pratt Institute.

== Career ==
After finishing school, Miller worked in broadcast design where she created on-air sets and graphics. During this time she created the logo and identity for BET. After 10 years in broadcasting, she moved to New York City and attended Pratt Institute, then graduated from Union Theological Seminary.

Miller was pivotally involved in the launch and early work of AIGA's DEI efforts in the 1990s. "The first AIGA Minority Task Force was established in1989 to help end the marginalization of people of color..." It was composed of Miller, John Morning, and six other professionals. The group created and ran the April 5, 1991 symposium: "Why Is Graphic Design 93% White?" Miller's contributions and work advanced advocacy efforts for minority designers, raising "awareness in the design community of the problems that minority designers were having in gaining jobs and experience." Caroline Warner Hightower was the AIGA executive director who collaborated with designers like Miller on AIGA's early DEI efforts.

=== Writing ===
In 1987, Print Magazine published an article on Miller's thesis titled "Black Designers Missing in Action." The thesis and article started a movement to research and promote more diverse designers and for the industry to develop a discourse on the role of diversity in the practice. In 1990, by Step-by-Step magazine published "Embracing Cultural Diversity in Design". In 2013 she wrote a memoir, Black Coral: A Daughter's Apology to her Asian Island Mother.

In 2016, the magazine published a follow-up to the 1987 article. The article spurred Stanford University design scholar Michael Grant and the library's special collection director, Regina Roberts, to archive the thesis and catalog of Miller's design work in the Cheryl D. Miller Collection the university. Miller's research found that post-Civil War, the Typographic Union of white printers shut out black and women artisans from the industry to further their own business goals.

Miller's articles are the cornerstone of AIGA's Diversity and Inclusion Taskforce. She is regarded as a trade writer to the graphic design industry. Her influence is seen in the way contemporary graphic designers critically engage with the discipline, on the direction of the field and creators who make up its community, and her thesis is highlighted as crucial text that paved the way for Black designers. Her writing encourages designers and critics to examine the design cannon to discover diverse voices and work which shaped the design industry today. She contends its important due to design's role in social history, and by not documenting or understanding all of the industry's practitioners, our society has a weaker understanding of humanity.

In 2020, Miller began additional work decolonizing the history of graphic design through a curated database titled The History of Black Graphic Design, a curated database constructed with the support of Stanford University librarians.

Published on Medium in 2020 as part of Future of Design in Higher Education after watching Miller present at IIT Institute of Design, Eugene Korsunskiy writes about their experience listening to Miller share her views about contemporary graphic design elements that symbolize racism and oppression.

"I would like to retire the Paul Rand look. I would like to retire mid-century Helvetica. I want to retire flush left. I want to retire rag right. I want to retire white space. I want to retire the Swiss grid… It is the look of my oppressor… a mid-century era when it wasn't easy to enter the NY marketplace as a Black designer. When I see that look, the only thing it says to me is, "You cannot enter. You don't belong. You're not good enough."

Miller's second book publication, HERE: Where the Black Designers Are, was released in October 2024. It is a historical memoir of a life in advocacy and her journey to answer the question: "Where are the Black designers?" This work integrates historical investigation and an urgent call for justice and recognition for Black designers. It "contributes to the decolonization of graphic design's historical canon by claiming and reclaiming Black contributions to the field." The book concludes with an excerpt from Miller's commencement speech to the RISD class of 2022. In her own words: "Be better than the history I've traveled through and make your history far more inclusive and welcoming for everyone to encounter."

=== Design ===
In 1984, Miller moved to New York City with her husband and, until 2000, ran her own design studio, Cheryl D. Miller Design Inc. Some of the clients included BET, Chase, Time Inc., and American Express. Her personal work was acquired by Stanford University Libraries. She is further collected at The Poster House, New York, and The Design Museum, The Hague. In 1992, Miller was commissioned by NASA to create the poster for Dr. Mae Jeminson, America's first African-American woman astronaut.

Available on YouTube, Miller reflects on her long career as a designer. She showcases pieces from her portfolio that are now part of Stanford University's Special Collections and Archives.

On April 3, 2021, Miller was an expert guest on the Design Dedux podcast, where she spoke about gender and race equality in graphic design.

Miller hosted the "AIGA 2024 MARGINS" conference, featuring speakers from various industry leaders in the field of higher education.

As of 2025, Miller's contribution to the design industry, specifically her work toward mobilizing for racial equality, has been featured in Meggs' The History of Graphic Design (7th ed.).

She is further noted as a educator and advocate for diversity in the design industry by the Graphic Artists Guild. The 17th edition of the Graphic Artists Guild Handbook: Pricing & Ethical Guidelines was released in Fall 2025 and was dedicated to Dr. Miller.

=== Christian ministry ===
Miller is a Master of Divinity graduate from the Union Theological Seminary in New York City. She was ordained in the United Church of Christ and the American Baptist Churches USA and is a professional Christian minister.

== Awards and residencies ==
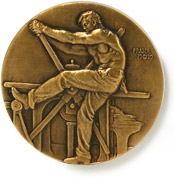
AIGA Medal awarded to Miller in 2021 for Expanding Access

In 2021, Miller was awarded an AIGA Medal, one of the highest distinctions in the design field, to designers whose influence, careers, and bodies of work represent exemplary and unique stories of dedication to craft, career growth, and the tightly woven fabric of design, technology, culture, and society. "Miller is recognized for her outsized influence within the profession to end the marginalization of BIPOC designers through her civil rights activism, industry exposé writing, research rigor, and archival vision.". Additionally, the same year, Miller was awarded Cooper Hewitt's "Design Visionary" award.

During the 2020 academic year, Miller became the Distinguished Senior Lecturer for Design and Designer in Residence at the University of Texas at Austin. She is also a faculty member at Howard University and Lesley University College of Art and Design where she teaches graphic design.

In 2021, Cheryl became Maryland Institute College of Art William O. Steinzmetz Designer in Residence Scholar. As part of this residency, Miller participated in "Voices: Black Graphic Design History," where she held conversations with three other Steinmetz D webinar lectures. In 2021, IBM announced that Miller would be the inaugural IBM Design Scholar as part of its Honorary IBM Design Scholar residency program.

Miller was awarded a Doctor of Humane Letters from the Vermont College of Fine Arts, February 2021. In May 2022, Miller was awarded a Doctor of Fine Arts from Maryland Institute College of Art. In June 2022, Miller was awarded a Doctor of Fine Arts from the Rhode Island School of Design. She received an honorary Doctorate in Fine Arts in May 2023 from Pratt Institute.

In 2021, Miller was both a Cooper Hewitt National Design Awardee as a “Design Visionary” and an Honorary IBM Design Scholar, “Eminent Luminary.” In October 2022, Miller was a The One Club Hall of Fame Inductee.

On October 11, 2025, Miller was awarded the 2025 Steve Heller Prize for Cultural Commentary. The honor recognizes her significant contributions to cultural commentary, including her body of work, and her tireless advocacy for equity and inclusion in the field of design in alignment with the prize's focus on insightful analysis of design's role in society.

== Bibliography ==
- Cheryl D Miller (May 1985). "Black Designers Missing in Action". Scribd.
- Black Coral: A Daughter's Apology to her Asian Island Mother, Aage Heritage Press, 2013. ISBN 9780989263207
- Cheryl D Miller (October 2020). "Trilogy Series Black Designers Missing in Action". PRINT.
- Cheryl D Miller (September 24, 2020). "Black Designers: Forward in Action (Part I)". PRINT. Retrieved December 12, 2024.
- Cheryl D Miller (September 24, 2020). "Black Designers: Forward in Action (Part II)". PRINT. Retrieved December 12, 2024.
- Cheryl D Miller (September 24, 2020). "Black Designers: Forward in Action (Part III)". PRINT. Retrieved December 12, 2024.
- Cheryl D Miller (September 24, 2020). "Black Designers: Forward in Action (Part IV)". PRINT. Retrieved December 12, 2024.
- Cheryl D Miller (December 2020). "From 'Black Designers: Missing in Action' to 'Forward in Action': 3 Essential Industry Articles". PRINT. Retrieved January 1, 2006.
- Cheryl D Miller "Black Artist in Graphic Communication" CA journal
- Cheryl D Holmes-Miller (June 2023). "Living History: Connecting the Threads Between Juneteenth and the Story of Black Graphic Designers" PRINT. Retrieved June 28, 2024.
- Cheryl D Holmes-Miller (October 31, 2023). "Five Essential Design Books to Decolonize Your Studio, Library, and Classroom" PRINT. Retrieved October 23, 2024.
- HERE: Where the Black Designers Are, Princeton Architectural Press, 2024. ISBN 978-1797225722
- Decolonizing Graphic Design from a Black Perspective, Kendall Hunt, 2025. ISBN 9798385112111
- Cheryl D Miller (August 18, 2025). "Ralph Lauren’s New Collection Centers the History of Black Joy and Belonging on Martha’s Vineyard." PRINT. Retrieved August 20, 2025.
- Cheryl D Miller (November 2025). "New Edition of ‘Meggs’ History of Graphic Design’ Reforms the Canon." PRINT. Retrieved November 7, 2025.

== Collections and exhibitions ==
- Maryland Institute College of Art Steinmetz Designer in Residence Exhibition, 2021
- The Cheryl D. Miller Collection at Stanford University
- MvVo Art AD Show, New York
- The Poster House Museum, New York
- The Design Museum Deldel
- The Cheryl D. Miller Collection of Black Graphic Design History at The Herb Lubalin Study Center of Design and Typography
- Mosley Gallery
- University of Maryland Eastern Shore

== Media ==
=== Podcast episodes ===
- "Revision Path: Episode 248; Cheryl D. Miller" This episode has been added to the Collection of the Smithsonian National Museum of African American History and Culture.
- "Episode 500: Dr. Cheryl D. Miller"
- "It's about Time for a History in Black Design — Part I" (Episode 6)
- "Th¡nk - Interview with Cheryl D. Miller: Slavery, Justice, and the Future of Design"
- "I Was There w/ Dr. Cheryl D. Miller - Part 1"
- "Design Education Talks Special: Cheryl D. Miller: Decolonising Graphic Design" (interview audio only)
  - "Design Education Talks Special: Cheryl D. Miller: Decolonising Graphic Design(interview audio and video)
- "We are HERE! w/ Dr. Cheryl Miller - Part 2"
- "Breaking Barriers in Design: Dr. Cheryl D. Miller on Diversity, Legacy & Decolonizing Graphic Design"

=== Lectures and presentations ===
- "The Cheryl D Miller Portfolio 2020"
- "Cheryl D. Miller: The History of "Where are the Black designers?"
- "White Default with Cheryl D. Miller"
- "Visiting Artist, Scholar, and Designer Program | Cheryl D. Miller"
- "The History of Black Women in Graphic Design"
