= National Committee for Responsive Philanthropy =

Nonprofit organization in the U.S.

The National Committee for Responsive Philanthropy (NCRP) is a progressive advocacy and watchdog group that monitors charitable spending in the United States. It was established in 1976 and is based in Washington, D.C. It advocates for a greater focus on social justice in the philanthropic sector.

== History ==
NCRP was founded in 1976 by the Donee Group, a coalition of nonprofit leaders across the nation who asserted that traditional philanthropy was falling short of addressing critical public needs. The Donee Group grew out of the Filer Commission, which was initiated by John D. Rockefeller III in 1973 to study philanthropic giving.

== Activities ==
NCRP has conducted research on the financial accountability of philanthropic foundations, philanthropic support for the agenda of the Religious Right, the effect of bank mergers on charitable giving, rural philanthropy, and the importance of general operating support for grantees.

== See also ==
- Council on Foundations
- Philanthropy Roundtable
