= C. Douglas Dillon =

American diplomat (1909–2003)

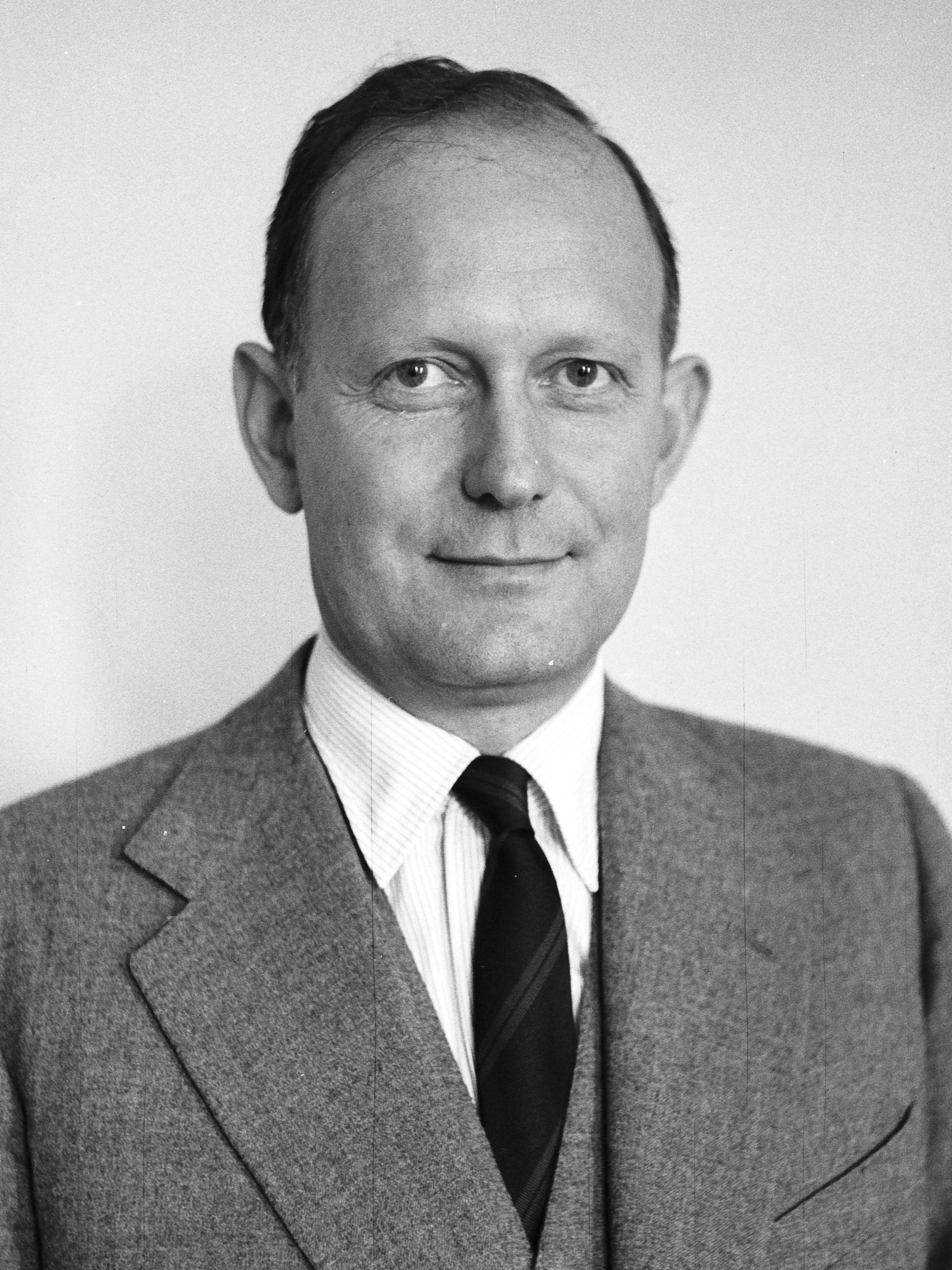
- Dillon in 1955

57th United States Secretary of the Treasury
- In office January 21, 1961 – April 1, 1965
- President: John F. Kennedy; Lyndon B. Johnson
- Preceded by: Robert B. Anderson
- Succeeded by: Henry H. Fowler

21st United States Under Secretary of State
- In office June 12, 1959 – January 4, 1961
- President: Dwight D. Eisenhower
- Preceded by: Christian Herter
- Succeeded by: Chester Bowles

2nd Under Secretary of State for Economic Affairs
- In office July 1, 1958 – June 11, 1959
- President: Dwight D. Eisenhower
- Preceded by: William L. Clayton
- Succeeded by: George Ball

United States Ambassador to France
- In office March 13, 1953 – January 28, 1957
- President: Dwight D. Eisenhower
- Preceded by: James C. Dunn
- Succeeded by: Amory Houghton

Personal details
- Born: Clarence Douglass Dillon; August 21, 1909 Geneva, Switzerland
- Died: January 10, 2003 (aged 93) New York City, New York, U.S.
- Party: Republican
- Spouses: Phyllis Chess Ellsworth (m. 1931; died 1982) Susan Sage (m. 1983)
- Children: 2, including Joan
- Parent(s): Clarence Dillon; Anne McEldin (née Douglass)
- Education: Groton School; Harvard University (BA)

Military service
- Allegiance: United States
- Branch/service: United States Navy
- Years of service: 1941-1946
- Rank: Lieutenant Commander
- Battles/wars: World War II

Clarence Douglas Dillon (born Clarence Douglass Dillon; August 21, 1909 – January 10, 2003) was an American investment banker, diplomat and Republican politician who served as the United States ambassador to France from 1953 to 1957 and as the 57th United States Secretary of the Treasury from 1961 to 1965. He was also a member of the Executive Committee of the National Security Council (ExComm) during the Cuban Missile Crisis. His conservative economic policies while Secretary of the Treasury were designed to protect the U.S. dollar.

== Early life ==
Dillon was born on August 21, 1909, in Geneva, Switzerland, to very wealthy American parents, Anne McEldin (née Douglass) and financier Clarence Dillon. Although Dillon grew up as a patrician, his paternal grandfather, Samuel Lapowski, was a poor Jewish emigrant from Poland. After leaving Poland, his grandfather settled in Texas after the American Civil War and married Dillon's Swedish-American grandmother. Dillon's father later changed his family name to Dillon, an Anglicization of "Dylion", his grandmother's maiden name. Dillon's mother was descended from the Graham family, Lairds of Tamrawer Castle at Kilsyth, Stirling, Scotland.

Dillon began his education at Pine Lodge School in Lakehurst, New Jersey. He continued at Groton School in Massachusetts, then at Harvard College, A.B. magna cum laude 1931 in American history and literature. Dillon earned a varsity letter for football his senior year.

== Career ==
In 1938, he became Vice-President and Director of the investment bank Dillon, Read & Co., a firm that bore his father's name (Clarence Dillon). After his World War II service on Guam, on Saipan, and in the Philippines, he left the United States Navy as Lieutenant Commander decorated with the Legion of Merit and Air Medal. In 1946 he became chairman of Dillon, Read; by 1952 he had doubled the firm's investments.

=== Political career ===
Dillon had been active in Republican politics since 1934. He worked for John Foster Dulles in Thomas E. Dewey's 1948 presidential campaign. In 1951 he organized the New Jersey effort to secure the 1952 Republican nomination for Dwight D. Eisenhower. He was also a major contributor to Eisenhower's general election campaign in 1952.

President Eisenhower appointed him United States Ambassador to France in 1953. Following his return he became Under Secretary of State for Economic Affairs in 1958 before becoming Under Secretary of State the following year. TIME reported that if Richard Nixon had won the presidential election of 1960 that Dillon was to be chosen as Secretary of State.

== Secretary of the Treasury ==
In 1961, John F. Kennedy, appointed Republican Dillon Treasury Secretary. Dillon remained Treasury Secretary under President Lyndon B. Johnson until 1965. According to Richard Dean Burns and Joseph M. Siracusa, Dillon's leadership of the economic policy team, exerted significant conservative influence on the overall direction of the administration. He effectively convinced the president that the nation's main economic challenge was the balance of payments deficit, leading to the adoption of a moderate approach and the dismissal of more radical liberal solutions to domestic issues. President Kennedy's choice of Dillon as Secretary of the Treasury reflected a deep concern about the balance of payments deficit and the resulting "gold drain." By choosing Dillon, a Wall Street figure with strong Republican connections and a reputation for advocating sound monetary policies, Kennedy aimed to reassure the financial community, which was apprehensive about the potential loose monetary policies of the incoming Democratic administration. According to Theodore Sorensen, the president's choice was primarily influenced by the need to maintain global confidence in the dollar and prevent a massive conversion of dollars into gold. Kennedy shared Dillon's moderately conservative economic perspectives at the time of his appointment, and Dillon enjoyed close access to the president throughout his presidency. He was one of the few political associates who socialized with Kennedy as well.

The emphasis placed by Kennedy and Dillon on addressing the balance of payments issue had a substantial impact on the administration's overall economic policy, steering it toward conservatism. The growing annual deficits in dollar payments had led to a significant accumulation of dollars in the hands of foreign banks and governments. The recurring loss of confidence in the value of the dollar prompted foreign holders to exchange their dollars for American gold, which had a fixed value relative to the dollar. This "gold drain" raised concerns within the financial community and remained a prominent issue during both the Kennedy and Johnson administrations. In an effort to stabilize the status of the dollar and halt the outflow of gold, the Kennedy administration avoided economic measures that could potentially increase inflation and undermine foreign confidence in the dollar. During the initial years of Kennedy's presidency, Dillon's success in prioritizing the payments deficit prevented more aggressive fiscal and monetary interventions in the economy or increased spending on social programs.

On tariff policy, Dillon proposed the fifth round of tariff negotiations under the General Agreement on Tariffs and Trade (GATT), conducted in Geneva 1960–1962; it came to be called the "Dillon Round" and led to substantial tariff reduction. Dillon was important in securing presidential power for reciprocal tariff reductions under the Trade Expansion Act of 1962. He also played a role in crafting the Revenue Act of 1962, which established a 7 percent investment credit to spur industrial growth. He supervised revision of depreciation rules to benefit corporate investment.

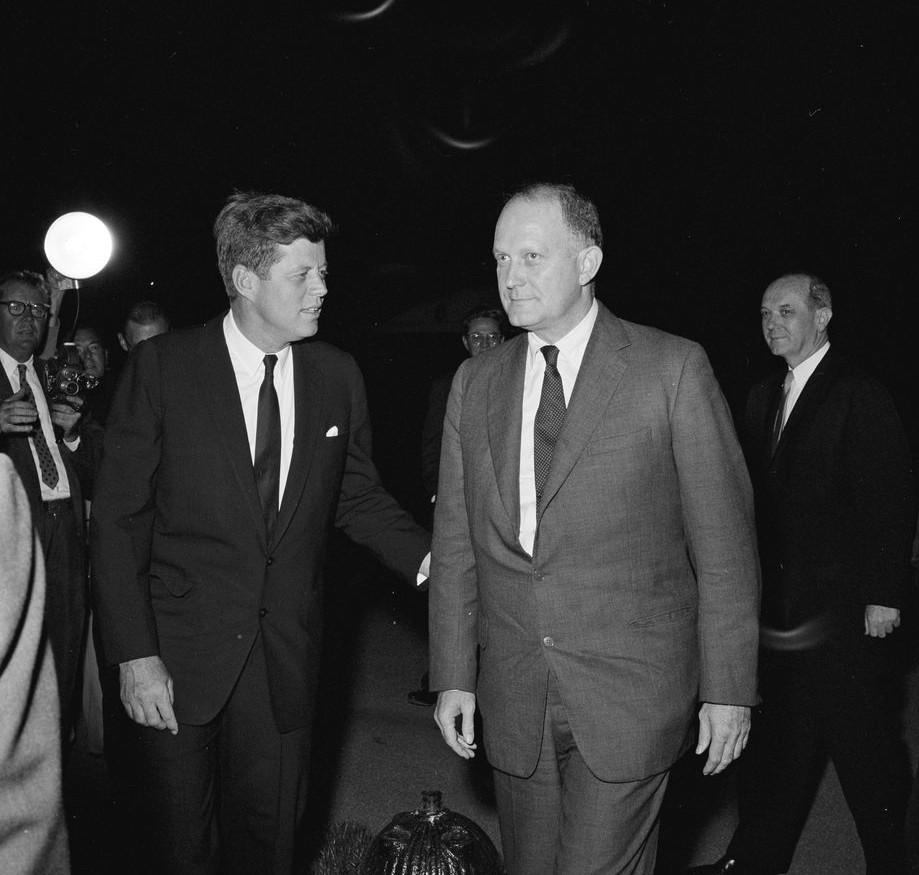
Dillon and Kennedy in August 1961. Dillon had just returned from the conference in Uruguay in which the Alliance for Progress was formalized, and where Dillon had discussions with Che Guevara.

Dillon supervised the development of a reform package. He made a case before Congress to withhold taxes on interest and dividend income. The goal was to combat widespread tax evasion. Additionally, he advocated for the closure of loopholes utilized by foreign "tax haven" corporations and businessmen who deducted entertainment expenses. Although Congress rejected most of the administration's reform program during the summer of 1962, Dillon nevertheless endorsed the final package because it included a 7 percent investment tax credit.

Kennedy also made use of Dillon's diplomatic skills. He was made the leader of the American delegation dispatched to Punta del Este, Uruguay, in August 1961 to commence the Alliance for Progress. Dillon committed the U.S. to provide $20 billion in low-interest loans over the next decade to enhance the living conditions in Latin America. He endorsed the "revolution of rising expectations" and aimed to convert it into a "revolution of rising satisfactions." Additionally, Dillon served on the National Security Council and actively participated in the intense discussions surrounding the Cuban Missile Crisis in October 1962.

== Philanthropy and Central Intelligence Agency ==
A close friend of John D. Rockefeller III, he was chairman of the Rockefeller Foundation from 1972 to 1975. He also served alongside John Rockefeller on the 1973 Commission on Private Philanthropy and Public Needs, and under Nelson Rockefeller in the Rockefeller Commission to investigate CIA activities. He served as president of Harvard Board of Overseers, chairman of the Brookings Institution, and vice chairman of the Council on Foreign Relations.

=== Metropolitan Museum of Art ===
With his first wife, Dillon collected Impressionist art. He was a longtime trustee of the Metropolitan Museum of Art, serving as its President (1970–1977) and then chairman. He built up its Chinese galleries and served as a member of the Museum's Centennial committee. He donated $20 million to the museum and led a fundraising campaign, which raised an additional $100 million.

In 2004, the Metropolitan Museum of Art exhibited The Douglas Dillon Legacy: Chinese Painting for the Metropolitan Museum, celebrating Dillon’s gifts and the establishment of The Dillon Fund in the field of Chinese art. The exhibit displayed more than 50 Chinese masterworks. The Dillon Fund supported the creation of the Douglas Dillon Galleries for Chinese Painting and Calligraphy and “endowed a departmental chairmanship in Chinese art, and a position in Chinese painting conservation, and provided funding for several important publications on the collection.”

He received the Medal of Freedom in 1989.

== Personal life ==
On March 10, 1931, Dillon married the former Phyllis Chess Ellsworth (1910–1982) (Note: Phyllis was born in South Bend, St. Joseph County, Indiana on August 3, 1910, and died in New York City, New York on June 20, 1982.) in Boston, Massachusetts. Phyllis was the daughter of John Chess Ellsworth and Alice Frances Chalifoux. The couple had two daughters:

- Phyllis Ellsworth Dillon Collins
- Joan Douglas Dillon (b. 1935), former president of French Bordeaux wine company Domaine Clarence Dillon.

In 1983, the widowed Dillon married the former Susan "Suzzie" Slater (1917–2019). She had first been married to Theodore "Ted" Sheldon Bassett (1911–1983) in 1939 (div.). In 1949 she married British entertainer Jack Buchanan (1891–1957). In 1961 she wed DeWitt Linn Sage (1905–1982), who again left her a widow.

Dillon died of natural causes on January 10, 2003, at the New York-Presbyterian Hospital in New York City at the age of 93.

=== Descendants ===
Through his daughter Joan's first marriage, he was a grandfather of Joan Dillon Moseley (b. 1954), and through his daughter Joan’s second marriage to Prince Charles of Luxembourg, he was a grandfather to Princess Charlotte (b. 1967) and Prince Robert (b. 1968) followed. After Prince Charles' death in 1977, Joan married Philippe, 8th duc de Mouchy in 1978, without further issue.

== In fiction ==
In the Brendan DuBois novel Resurrection Day (1999), the Cuban Missile Crisis erupts into a full-scale nuclear war and Washington, D.C., is destroyed. President John F. Kennedy is killed, as is Vice President Lyndon Johnson, most of the Senate and Congress, and most members of the Kennedy administration. Dillon, the Secretary of the Treasury, is eventually found to have survived the war and becomes the 36th President of the United States.

== See also ==
- List of U.S. political appointments that crossed party lines
- Rockefeller Foundation
- Metropolitan Museum of Art

Diplomatic posts
Preceded by James Clement Dunn	U.S. Ambassador to France; March 13, 1953 – January 28, 1957	Succeeded by Amory Houghton
Government offices
Preceded by William L. Clayton	Under Secretary of State for Economic Affairs; July 1, 1958 – June 11, 1959	Succeeded by George Wildman Ball
Preceded by Christian Herter	Under Secretary of State; June 12, 1959 – January 4, 1961	Succeeded by Chester Bowles
Preceded by Robert B. Anderson	U.S. Secretary of the Treasury; Served under: John F. Kennedy, Lyndon B. Johnson; January 21, 1961 – April 1, 1965	Succeeded by Henry H. Fowler
Cultural offices
Preceded by Arthur Amory Houghton Jr.	President of the Metropolitan Museum of Art; 1970-1977	Succeeded by William B. Macomber, Jr.
Non-profit organization positions
Preceded by Eugene R. Black Sr.	Chairman of the Brookings Institution; 1968 — 1975	Succeeded by Robert Roosa
Preceded by John D. Rockefeller III	Chairman of the Rockefeller Foundation; 1971 — 1975	Succeeded by Cyrus Vance
