= Ned Goodwin =

English-born Australian Master of Wine

- Born: 15 April 1969 (age 57); London
- Education: Newington College
- Occupations: Wine ambassador, educator & communicator
- Title: Master of Wine
- Children: Two

Ned Goodwin (born 15 April 1969) is an English-born Australian-raised Master of Wine. He has worked as a sommelier, educator, show judge, consultant, face of All Nippon Airways Business and First Class, TV wine show host and wine writer. In 2010 he became one of a few Masters of Wine in Asia, and was the first in Japan. He now lives in Sydney, Australia, and is the host of Langton’s TV, a Champagne Ambassador, a quality advisor for Biondi-Santi-Santi, owner of his own import company in Tokyo, educator and a member of the international jury of Australia’s Wine List of the Year Awards.

Executive Style magazine is quoted as saying that he is "ideally placed to gauge what wines work best with Japanese food". Goodwin has said that “while Japanese food and wine are not traditional brethren, an open minded yet sensitive understanding of the dominant flavours – sweet and salty – and textural delicacy, allows both the food and astutely chosen wines to sing.”

== Biography ==
Goodwin was born in London and raised in Sydney, Australia. He attended Newington College (1981–1987) before undertaking tertiary education in Tokyo and Paris. Goodwin has been a sommelier at Veritas in Manhattan, Les Juveniles in Paris and Michael's in Los Angeles. He was the host of a Japanese television show on wine, Vintage (2000) and was a guest-lecturer on wine marketing at Keio University (2002-2004). As a writer he has appeared in the New York Times, The Japan Times, Newsweek and Elle. From 2001 until November 2012 he was a wine director of the restaurant group Global Dining Japan. Goodwin currently chooses the first class and business class wines for a Japanese airline and is a brand ambassador for a Champagne house in Asia.
