= Primum Familiae Vini =

Association of family-owned wineries with a membership limited to twelve families

Primum Familiae Vini (often abbreviated PFV, Latin: "First Families of Wine") is an association of family-owned wineries with a membership limited to twelve families.

== History ==
The association was established in 1993 by Miguel Torres and Robert Drouhin (of Maison Joseph Drouhin), after they had first come up with the idea in 1990. The goal was to organise some of the best wine-producing families of the world, and to facilitate exchange between them. Requirements for membership are ownership of a winery that belongs to the top echelon of its region and enjoys a high international reputation. New members are only accepted by unanimous decision.

In February 2005, the Mondavi family (Napa Valley, California) left the association after the takeover of the family-owned business by Constellation Brands. In June 2006, the Famille Perrin joined the association.

In August 2018, Hubert de Billy (Champagne Pol Roger) was appointed the new president of the association, replacing Jean-Frederic Hugel. In October 2018, Prince Robert of Luxembourg - owner of Château Haut-Brion, Domaine Clarence Dillon and son of Prince Charles of Luxembourg - joined the PFV circle. In July 2019, Marc Perrin (Famille Perrin) was appointed president of the association.

== Description ==
The Primum Familiae Vini is an association of family-owned wineries with a membership limited to twelve families. According to its members, 85% of family businesses do not make it past the second generation, an issue that the association turned into its purpose.

Every year, all members of the association and their family members gather for an annual meeting.

== Current members ==
As of 2021, Primum Familiae Vini has twelve family members.

- Marchesi Antinori, Antinori, Tuscany, Italy
- Baron Philippe de Rothschild, Château Mouton Rothschild, Bordeaux (Pauillac), France
- Joseph Drouhin, Maison Joseph Drouhin, Burgundy (Beaune), France
- Egon Müller Scharzhof, Mosel (Saar), Germany
- Famille Hugel, Alsace, France
- Pol Roger, Champagne, France
- Famille Perrin (owners of Château de Beaucastel), Rhône (Orange), France, from 2006
- Symington Family Estates, Douro/Oporto, Portugal
- Tenuta San Guido (the producer of Sassicaia), Tuscany, Italy
- Familia Torres, Bodegas Torres, Catalonia, Spain
- Vega Sicilia, Ribera del Duero, Spain
- Domaine Clarence Dillon, Bordeaux

== Former members ==
A few members have had to leave after they no longer qualified as family-owned wineries.

- The Mondavi family (Napa Valley, California), until 2005, after the takeover of the family-owned business by Constellation Brands.
- Paul Jaboulet aîné, Rhône, France, until 2006.
- Bruno Prats, Château Cos d'Estournel, Bordeaux (Saint-Estèphe) until 1998, after selling their château.
