= Pol Roger =

Producer of champagne

Coordinates: 50.5315859°N 1.6231613°W

- Location: Vallée d'Épernay, Côte des Blancs
- Wine region: Champagne
- Cases/yr: 110,000
- Known for: Cuvée Sir Winston Churchill (prestige); Brut Vintage (second); Rosé Vintage (third) Non-vintage: Pure Brut, Brut Réserve and Rich
- Website: polroger.com

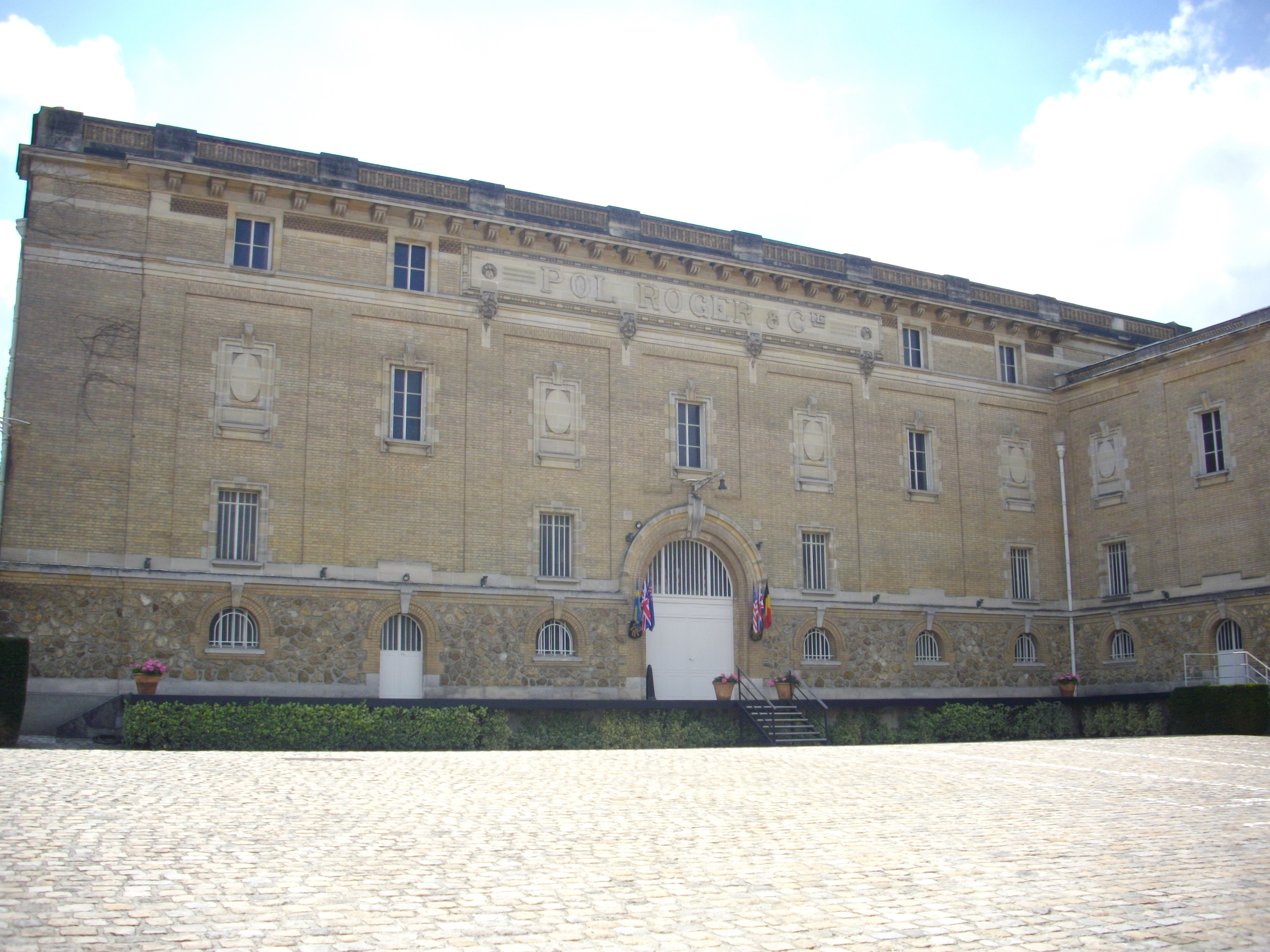
Pol-Roger in avenue de Champagne, Épernay

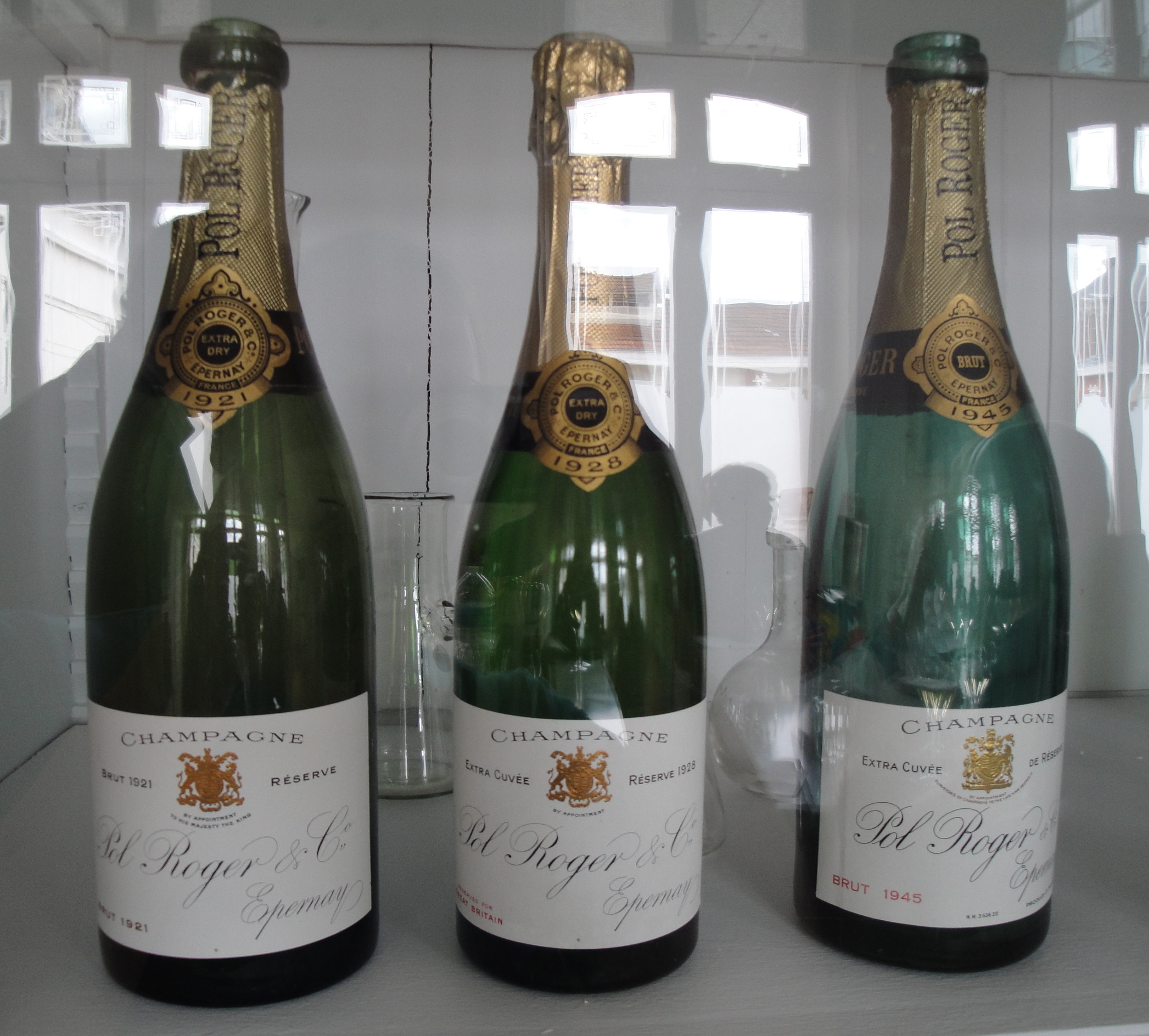
Bottles of Pol Roger champagne from 1921, 1928, and 1945

Pol Roger is a producer of champagne. The brand is still owned and run by the descendants of Pol Roger. Located in the town of Épernay in the Champagne region, the house annually produces around 110,000 cases of Champagne.

== History ==
Pol Roger was born on 24 December 1831, the son of a lawyer. Beginning as a wholesaler of wine, he started his own champagne house in 1849, with the first growths released in 1853. He received an imperial and royal warrant for the Austro-Hungarian court.

The owners of Pol Roger are members of the Primum Familiae Vini. Pol Roger held the Royal Warrant as purveyors of champagne to Queen Elizabeth II.

== Champagnes ==
The house's prestige label is the vintage Cuvée Sir Winston Churchill. Churchill was oft to repeat Napoleon's maxim on champagne: "In victory, deserve it. In defeat, need it!" They also release three non-vintage cuvées, the Pure Brut (no added sugar), Brut Réserve and Rich (sweet), as well as three other vintage wines, the Brut Vintage, Blanc de blancs and Rosé Vintage.

Pol Roger Brut Vintage is typically a blend of 40% Chardonnay and 60% Pinot noir, although this can vary.

=== Cuvée Sir Winston Churchill ===
Pol Roger had been the favourite champagne of Sir Winston Churchill since 1908, with Churchill even naming one of his racehorses "Pol Roger". After Churchill's death in 1965, Pol Roger placed a black border around the labels of Brut NV shipped to the United Kingdom. Odette Pol-Roger (née Odette Wallace (1911-2000), a granddaughter of the francophile art collector Sir Richard Wallace, 1st Baronet), whom Churchill had befriended at a party at the British Embassy in Paris in 1944, attended his funeral nearly 21 years later. In 1987, when the trees on Churchill's country retreat, Chartwell, were devastated by the Great Storm, the Pol-Roger family paid for much of the replanting.

In 1984, Pol Roger introduced the Pinot noir-dominant Cuvée Sir Winston Churchill. The first vintage of this cuvée (the one introduced in 1984) was the 1975, only released in magnum format. It has been followed by the 1979, 1982, 1985, 1986, 1988, 1990, 1993, 1995, 1996, 1998, 1999, 2000, 2002, 2004, 2006, 2008, 2009, 2012, 2013, and 2015 vintages. This cuvée is typically released around ten years after its vintage year, and its exact varietal composition is a very closely guarded secret.

Cuvée Sir Winston Churchill replaced the Pol Roger P.R. Reserve Speciale at the top of the range. Reserve Speciale was a 50% Chardonnay and 50% Pinot noir blend from 100% rated grand cru vineyards. First released with the 1971 vintage, it continued to be produced alongside Cuvee Sir Winston Churchill until the 1988 vintage, when its production was terminated as Pol Roger felt no need to have two competing prestige cuvees.

== See also ==
- List of Champagne houses
