= Domaine Clarence Dillon =

French wine company

- Company type: SAS (Société par actions simplifiée)
- Industry: Wine and Hospitality
- Founded: Paris, France (1935)
- Founder: Clarence Dillon
- Headquarters: 31 avenue Franklin D. Roosevelt 75008 Paris, France
- Key people: Prince Robert of Luxembourg (President)
- Products: Château Haut-Brion; Château La Mission Haut-Brion; Château Quintus; Clarendelle, Inspiré par Haut-Brion, Clarence Dillon Wines, Le Clarence, La Cave du Château, Big French Bottle
- Website: domaineclarencedillon.com

Domaine Clarence Dillon is a wine company run by a family that owns estates such as Château Haut-Brion (a 1855 Premier Grand Cru Classé), Château La Mission Haut-Brion (Grand Cru Classé de Graves), Château Quintus (Saint-Emilion Grand Cru) and Clarendelle. Since 2015, Domaine Clarence Dillon has also had a two-star gourmet restaurant Le Clarence and La Cave du Château, a wine shop, both in Paris.

== History ==
The company was founded on June 1, 1935, and named after its owner, the American financier Clarence Dillon, who bought Château Haut-Brion in 1935.

From 1935 to 1975, Seymour Weller, nephew of Clarence Dillon, managed the company.

From 1975 through 2008, Joan Dillon, Duchesse de Mouchy, served as president of Domaine Clarence Dillon.
Her husband, Philippe de Noailles, 8th Duke of Mouchy (1922–2011), was General Manager. Under their management, the company bought Château La Mission Haut-Brion, Château Laville Haut-Brion and Château La Tour Haut-Brion in 1983.

In 1993, Prince Robert of Luxembourg, son of the Duchesse de Mouchy and great-grandson of Clarence Dillon, joined the Board of Directors. In 2002, he became General Manager. Since 2008, Prince Robert of Luxembourg, her son by her marriage to Prince Charles of Luxembourg, is President of Domaine Clarence Dillon.

The Board of Directors of Domaine Clarence Dillon includes only descendants of Clarence Dillon, through his son C. Douglas Dillon, who had served as U.S. Secretary of the Treasury from 1961 to 1965, or his daughter Dorothy Dillon-Eweson.

In 2010, Domaine Clarence Dillon and the Dillon family became founding sponsors of La Cité du Vin in Bordeaux. This cultural center celebrating the global wine culture opened its stores in 2016, receiving close to half a million visitors annually. Prince Robert of Luxembourg is a member of the Board of Directors of La Cité du Vin Foundation and President of its Cultural Committee.

On June 24, 2011, Domaine Clarence Dillon announced the acquisition of Château Tertre Daugay, former First Growth of Saint-Emilion, now renamed Château Quintus.

In 2013, Château Quintus itself acquired the neighbouring property, Château L’Arrosée.

== Recent activities ==
On November 17, 2015, Domaine Clarence Dillon's scope of activities broadened with the creation of two new companies, both based in its headquarters, a mansion house located in the heart of Paris Golden Triangle. This residence allows visitors to discover the atmosphere of Château Haut-Brion while also discovering a gourmet cuisine awarded 2 Michelin stars, “Le Clarence”. Housed in the same building is “La Cave du Château”, a fine wine shop featuring a wide selection of wines sourced exclusively from the greatest terroirs of France. In November 2017 it created a website celebrating large format bottles: Big French Bottle.

In October 2018, Prince Robert of Luxembourg and Domaine Clarence Dillon joined Primum Familiae Vini, an international association of 12 of the world's finest wine producing families.
