= Sonal Holland =

Indian wine broadcaster, wine educator and wine judge

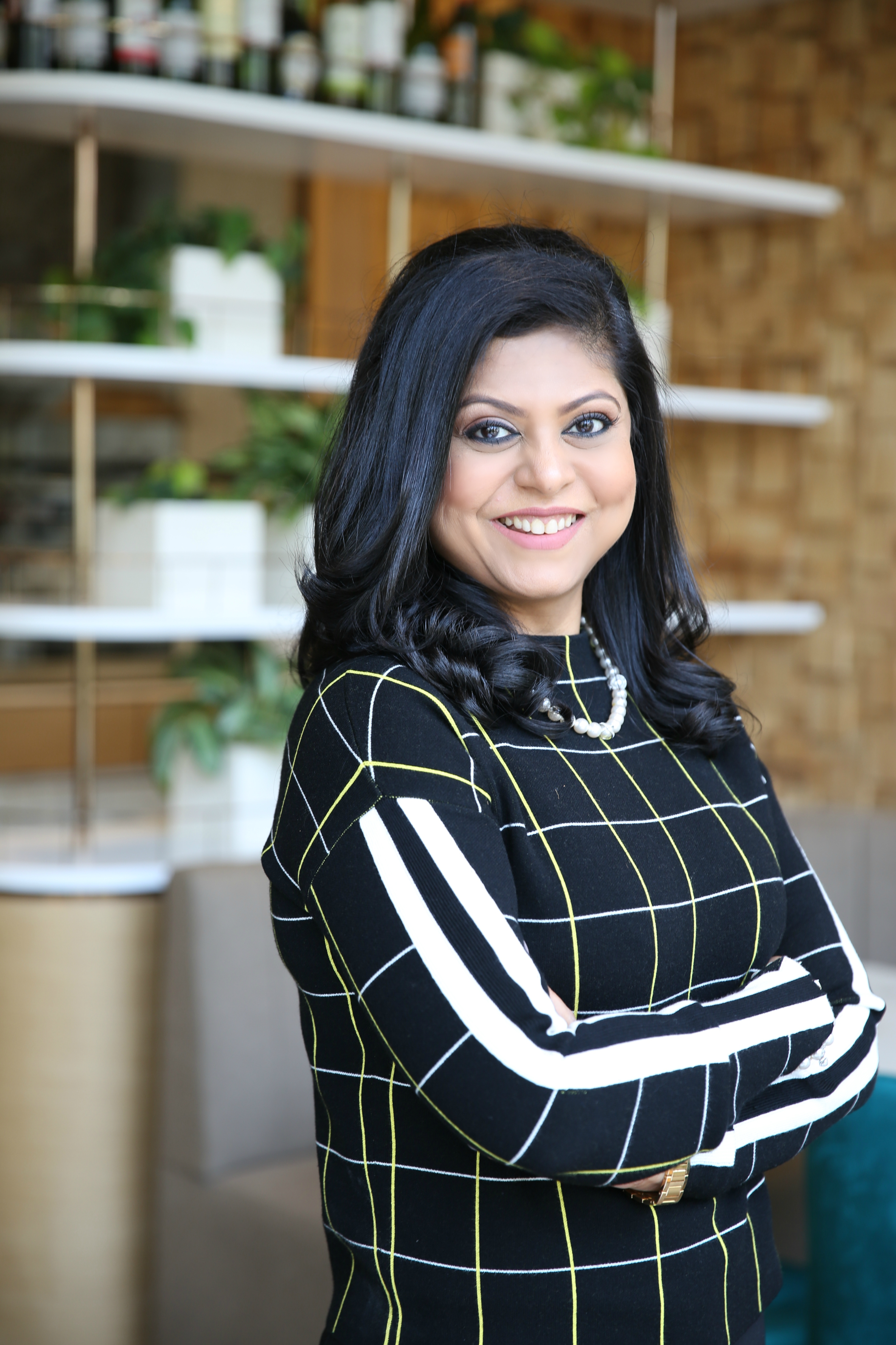
- Sonal Holland at her wine retail store in Mumbai in 2019
- Born: Sonal Chandole
- Occupations: Educator; Consultant; Entrepreneur for Wine, Saké and Spirits
- Known for: Sonal Holland Wine Academy, India Wine Awards, SoHo Wine Club, SoHo Wine Consultants
- Title: Founder Educator at Sonal Holland Wine Academy; Chairperson of India Wine Awards; Founder Director of SoHo Wine Club
- Website: sonalholland.com

Sonal Holland (née Chandole) is the first recipient of the Master of Wine title in India. She is a certified wine educator specialising in saké and shochu. Holland is also a consultant, retailer, broadcaster, and the founder of India Wine Awards, an Indian wine competition.

== Education ==
In 2016, Holland was named Master of Wine (MW) by the London-based Institute of Masters of Wine. Holland's dissertation was on "awareness, attitude and usage of wine among SEC A urban Indian wine consumers". Holland holds a master's degree in Business Administration from the University of Mumbai and a diploma in Hotel Management from the IHM Mumbai.

In February 2020, Holland received an advanced certification in Saké and Shochu from the Japan Saké and Shochu Makers Association.

== Career ==
Holland worked as the Divisional Head of Wine & Beverage for ITC Hotels.

In 2009, Holland founded the Sonal Holland Wine Academy, which provides wine education in association with the London-based WSET.

In 2017, Holland created the India Wine Awards, which recognizes excellence in wine and wine programs in the country.

In 2019, Holland entered the retail wine market with Vine2Wine.

She has judged several international competitions, including the 2018 Decanter Asia Wine Awards, Concours Mondial du Bruxelles, and the Hong Kong International Wine & Spirit Competition.

Her wine columns have been in such publications as Vogue, Mid-Day, and LuxeBook.

== Awards ==
- Top 50 Most Powerful Women in Indian Luxury for five consecutive years—2015, 2016 and 2017, 2018 and 2019 by luxury business magazine Luxebook
- In 2018, Sonal was honored with the 'Wine Personality of the Year' award by India's leading Food Bloggers Association of India (FBAI).
- In early 2019, she was honored and awarded at the Rotary International District Conference for her unique achievement as India's only Master of Wine.
- Named in the top 100 most powerful people in Indian luxury in 2020.
- Innovative Woman of Substance Award in 2019 at the India Leadership Conclave.
