= Egon Müller IV =

German winemaker

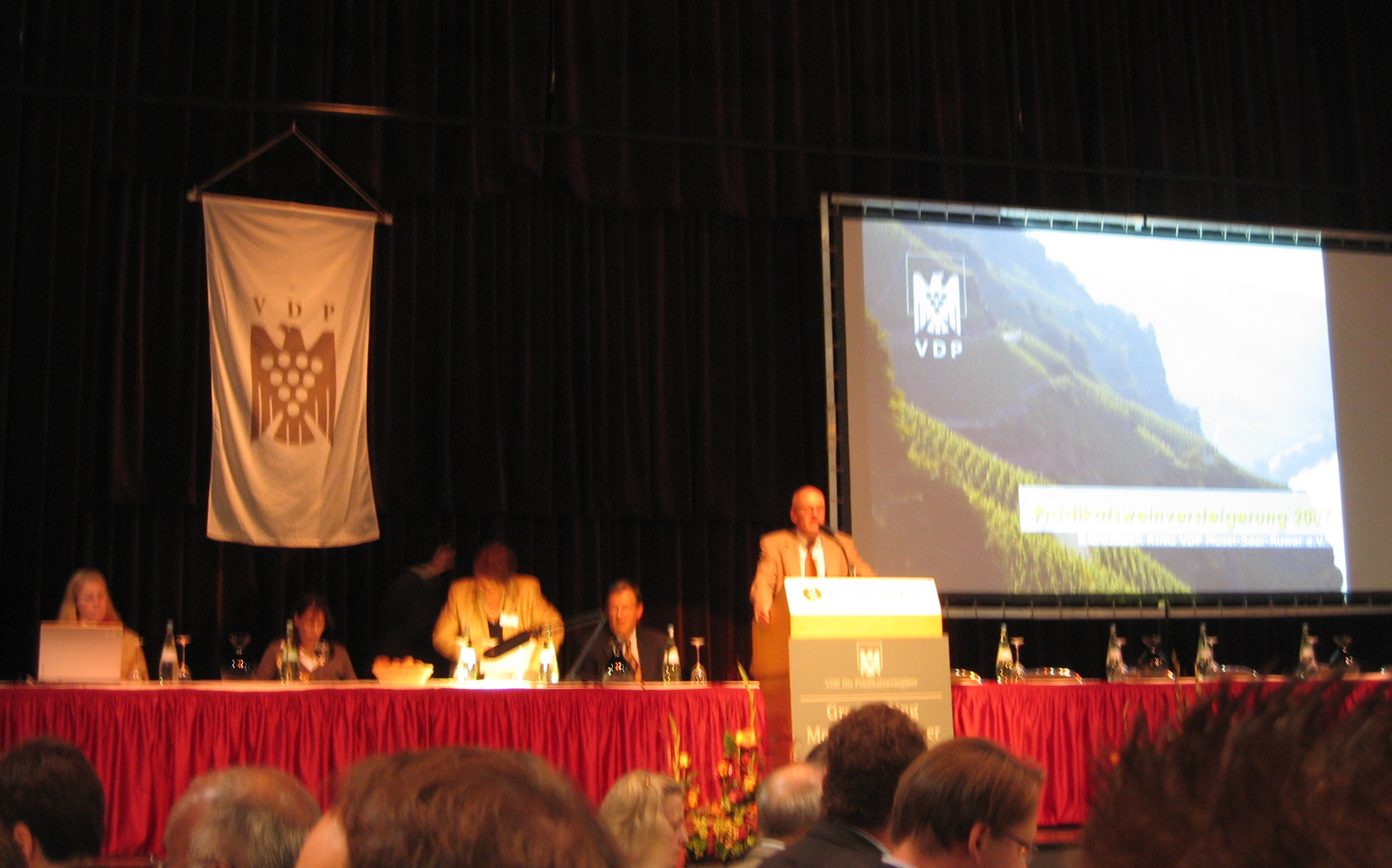
Egon Müller IV inaugurating sale at auction of the VDP Grosser Ring at the Europahalle in Trier

Egon Müller IV (born 20 August 1959), is a German winemaker and owner of the wine producer Weingut Egon Müller, Scharzhof, located just outside Wiltingen.

== Biography ==
Egon Müller IV is the sixth generation to manage the family winery. He is also the fourth one to be named Egon Müller (thus the IVth). He is a former student of the University of applied sciences Geisenheim.

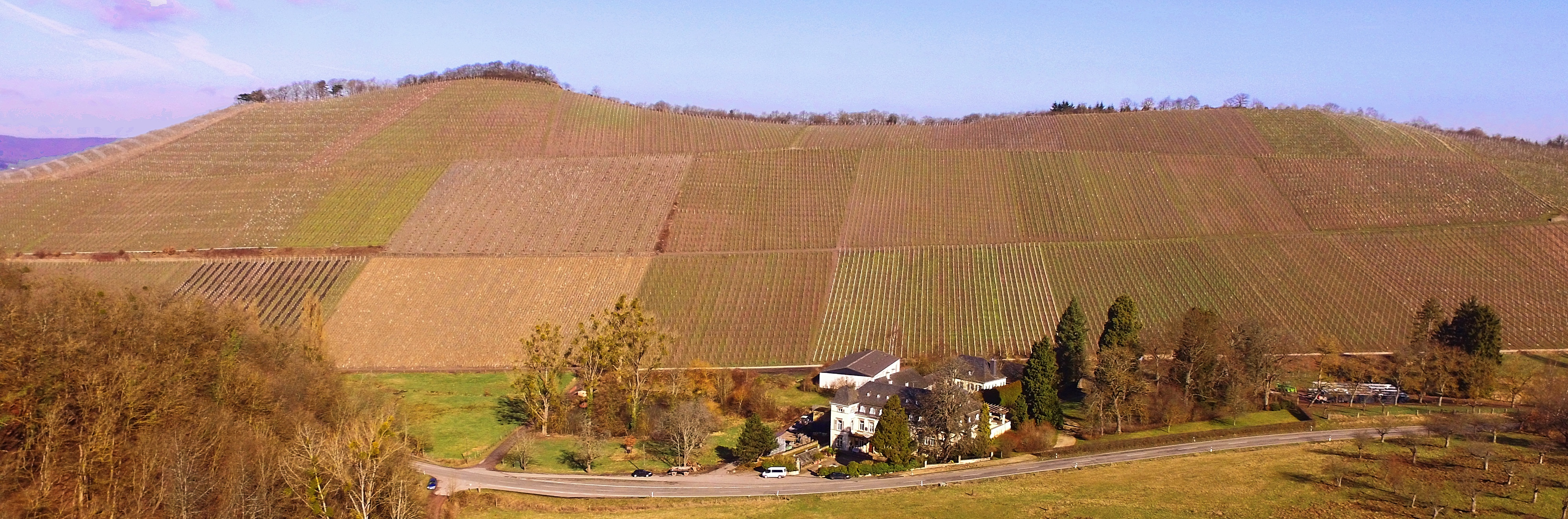
Vineyard Scharzhofberg and Scharzhof buildings.

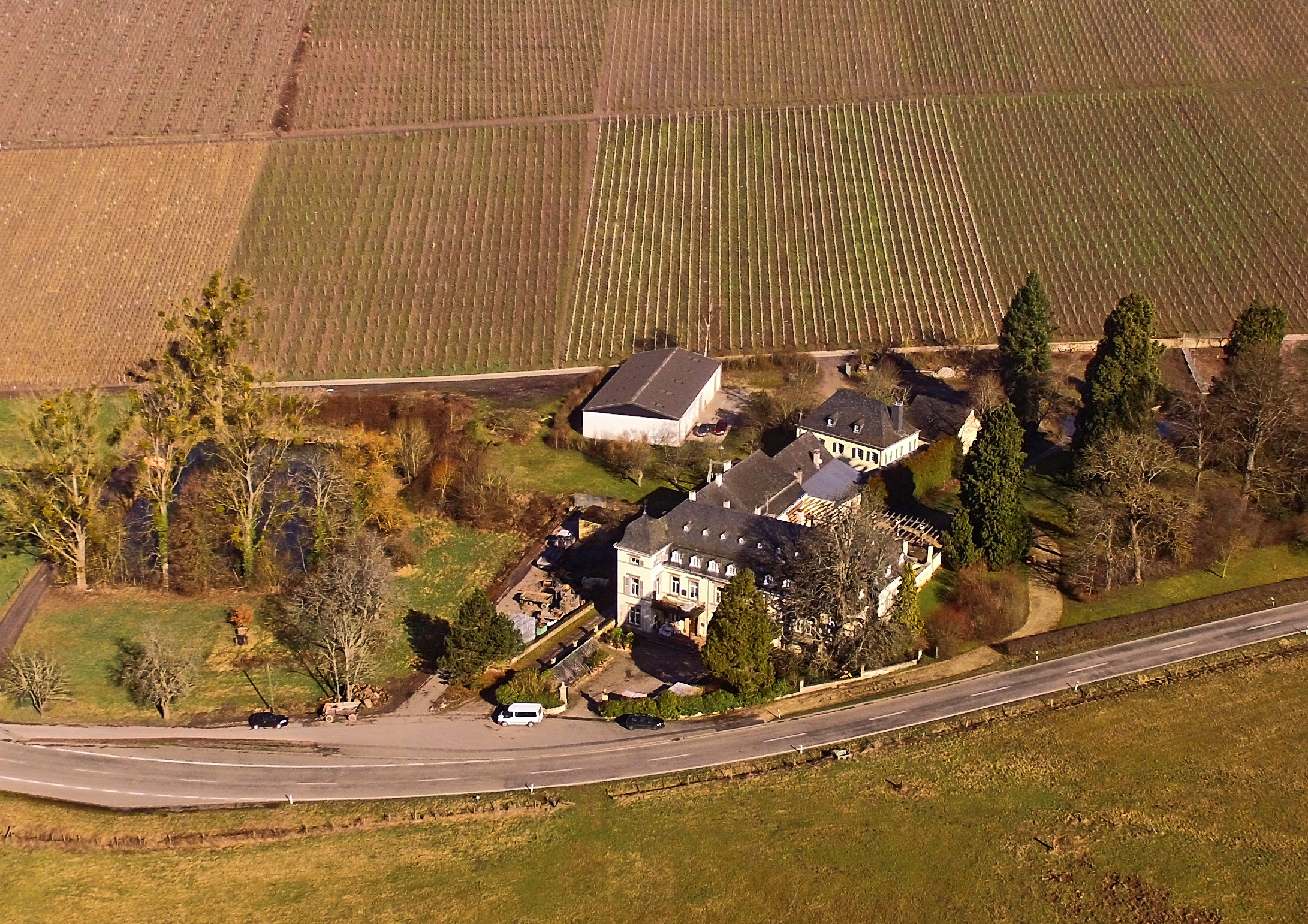
The Egon Muller winery at the foot of Wiltinger Scharzhofberg

Egon III extended the winery in 1954 by purchasing half of the Weingut "Le Gallais" (The other half still belongs to the descendants of the Le Gallais family). This winery with 2.5 hectares (6.2 acres) vines in Wiltingen, comprising the single vineyards "Kupp" and "braune Kupp" hailed originally from the Metz family. Egon Müller purchased one half and took the part of Madame Rochon de Pons at rent. With 35 hl/ha annual bottle production, he is among the wine producers of the Mosel region, more specifically the Saar district, and known for his Rieslings. According to Wine-Searcher, the winery's white wine ranks as the most expensive white wine in the world, with an average price of $13,670 per bottle. Egon Müller IV officially became the manager of the family wine estate in 1991, and became the sole manager after his father Egon III died in 2001.

Along with Miroslav Petrech, Egon Müller IV produces the Slovak Riesling label Château Belá, and the dry Australian Kanta Riesling from Adelaide Hills with Michael Andrewarta.

Weingut Egon Müller Scharzhofberg is a member of the Verband Deutscher Prädikatsweingüter (VDP) and the only German member of the Primum Familiae Vini.

== Filmography ==
- Mythos Scharzhofberg – Der teuerste Weißweinberg der Welt. (Myth Scharzhofberg - The most expensive vineyard for white wine in the world.) documentary film. Germany, 2017. 29:37 min. Script and direction: Paul Weber. Production: SWR, series: made in Südwest, broadcast: 22 November 2017 on SWR Fernsehen.

== See also ==
- List of wine personalities
