= Serena Sutcliffe =

British sommelier

Serena Sutcliffe, Master of Wine, (born 1945), is the head of Sotheby's international wine department, as well as a prominent writer on wine. She is married to fellow Master of Wine David Peppercorn. Joining the wine trade in 1971, she passed the Master of Wine examination at the first attempt and became only the second woman to hold the qualification.

== Career ==
Sutcliffe is considered one of the world's leading authorities on wine. A former chairman of the Institute of Masters of Wine, she was made a Chevalier of the Ordre des Arts et des Lettres by the French Government in 1988. She was elected to the Académie Internationale du Vin in 1993 and, in 2002, she received the New York Institute of Technology’s Professional Excellence Award. In 2006, she received the Lifetime Achievement Award from the Society of Bacchus America and was awarded the title of Chevalier of the Legion of Honour by the French Government for her seminal work in promoting and selling French wines.

== Publications ==
Sutcliffe is an internationally recognised wine writer and renowned taster and writes regularly for many international publications. Besides heading Sotheby’s worldwide wine auctions, she is also a member of Sotheby’s European Board and is a regular lecturer and broadcaster in Europe, the United States, and Asia. Her book The Wines of Burgundy appeared in its 8th edition in 2005.

== See also ==
- List of wine personalities
