= Caroline Warner Hightower =

American arts executive

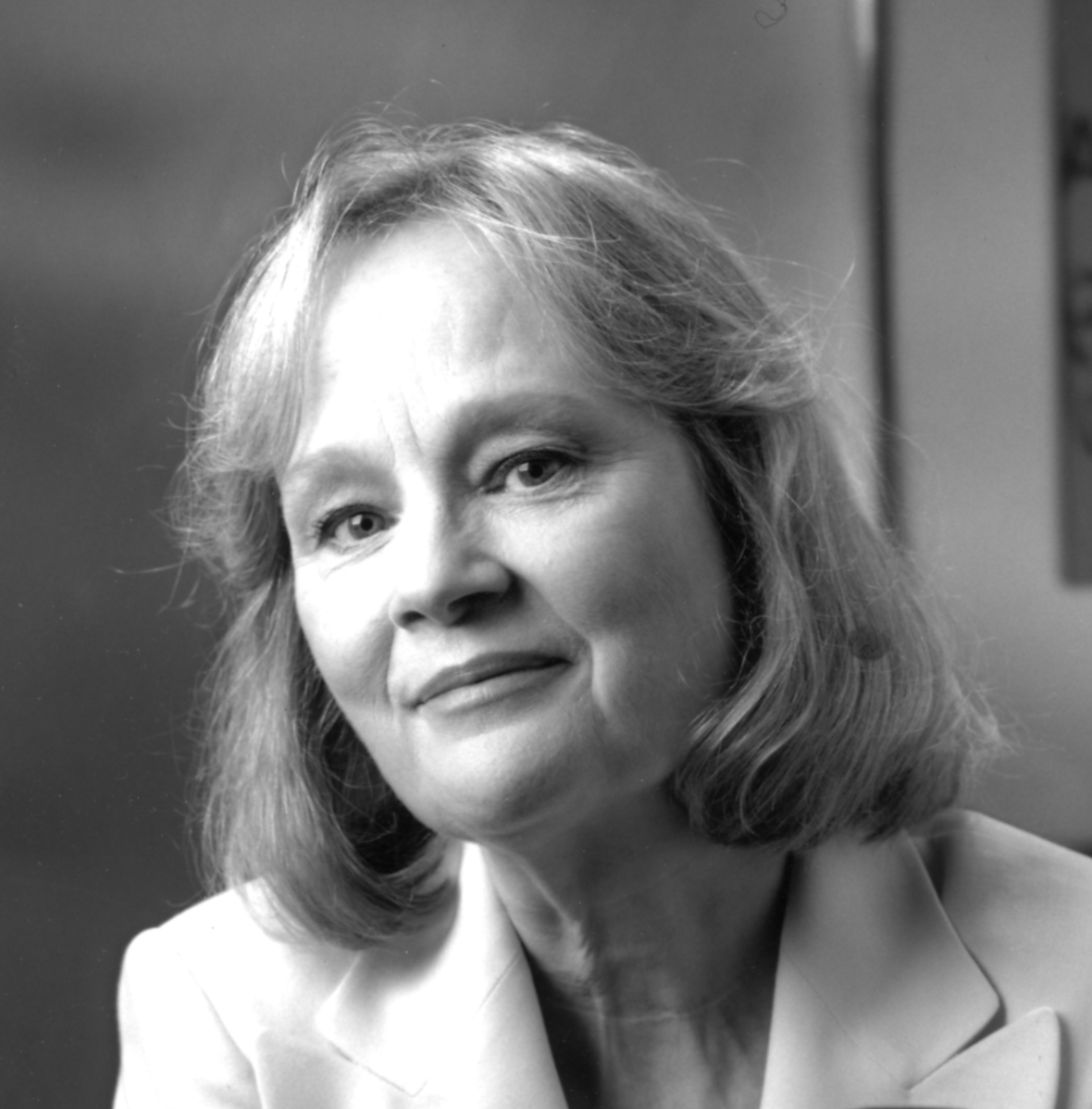
- Hightower in 1994
- Born: February 22, 1935 (age 91); Cambridge, Massachusetts
- Known for: Arts Executive
- Notable work: AIGA Journal, AIGA Library, AIGA Educational Committee, AIGA chapters
- Spouse: John Brantley Hightower. 1963; Divorced 1983
- Awards: AIGA Medalist
- Website: Aiga.org

Caroline Warner Hightower (born 1935) is an American arts executive, consultant, and former executive director of the American Institute of Graphic Arts (AIGA).

== Early life and education ==
Caroline Warner Hightower was born in Cambridge, Massachusetts where her father, Lloyd Warner, had a joint appointment at Harvard in the Department of Anthropology and the Harvard Business School. Her family moved to the Chicago when her father was appointed professor of anthropology and sociology at the University of Chicago. She attended Northwestern University, 1953; audited courses through Newnham College, Cambridge University (England) 1954; graduated from Pomona College, Claremont, CA., 1958.

== Career ==
From 1958 to 1976, Hightower worked at the University of California Press as a graphic designer, then moved to New York where she worked as an editor for McGraw Hill and The Saturday Review, and as a grant officer at Carnegie Corporation, where she was involved with the development of Sesame Street as a consultant. During this period she was also an editorial consultant to the Rockefeller Foundation, the Ford Foundation, The State University of New York and the United Nations.

Hightower was hired as executive director of the American Institute of Graphic Arts (AIGA) in 1977. Under her leadership, the organization became a nationally recognized organization for the design community. She is credited for initiating AIGA chapters in 38 cities, increasing income to $2.3 million from $215,000. She initiated programming that grew membership from 1,200 to 11,300 by introducing the AIGA journal, the annual, a national biennial design conference, the AIGA library and archives, the AIGA Education Committee, and symposiums including "Why is Graphic Design 93% White" and a subsequent national mentor program replicated by other national design organizations, and oversaw the purchase of the AIGA headquarters building at 164 Fifth Avenue in 1991.

Hightower left AIGA in 1995, working as a program development and fundraising consultant in New York. Hightower worked for institutions such as American Society of Media Photographers (1996-2000); New York University Arts Administration Program; United Way (1996-2000); The Clio Awards; The American Institute of Architects; and American Numismatic Society (2000-2002).

Hightower received the AIGA Medal in 2004. The typeface Hightower was designed by Tobias Frere Jones for the AIGA Journal in 1994.

Board Member: vice-chairman, with musician Billy Taylor, New York State Council on the Arts CAPS Program (grants to individual artists), 1974-1984; American Design Council, 1980-1994; The Innovative Design Fund, 1979-1984; Publishing Center for Cultural Resources, 1984-1989; National Kidney Cancer Association, 1991-1995.

Advisory Boards Member: Center for the Book, Library of Congress, 1978-1985; the Lubalin Center, Cooper Union, 1985-1992; Design Program, Rochester Institute of Technology, 1985-1993.

== Personal life ==
Hightower married John Brantley Hightower in November 1963, who was the former director of the New York State Council on the Arts, director of the Museum of Modern Art, president of the South Street Seaport Museum and director of the Mariners' Museum. They were divorced in 1983. She has a daughter named Amanda Brantley Hightower Redling, married to Carl Edward Redling, and a son Matthew Lloyd Hightower, and four grandchildren.

== Publications ==
- How Much Are Students Learning? Research paper for the Carnegie Commission on Education, 1973
- Private Philanthropy and Public Need: the Arts for the Filer Commission, presented to Congress; 1974
- Essay Caroline Hightower, Design Advocate by David R Brown in Graphic Design USA 16 Published by American Institute of Graphic Arts, Distributed by Watson Guptil, 1995 ISBN 0-8230-6391-7.
- Graphic Design for Non-Profit Organizations, Published by American Institute of Graphic Arts, 1980 ASIN B00IM2N9JM
- Symbol Signs: The complete study of passenger/pedestrian-oriented symbols developed by The American Institute of Graphic Arts for the U.S. Department of Transportation
- Hightower was the interviewer for the WGBH TV archival interview with AIGA medalist Paul Rand.

Graphic Design in America: A visual Language History Foreword

Published by Harry N. Abrams 1989
