= Château de Beaucastel =

French winery

Coordinates: 44.1048°N 4.8518°E

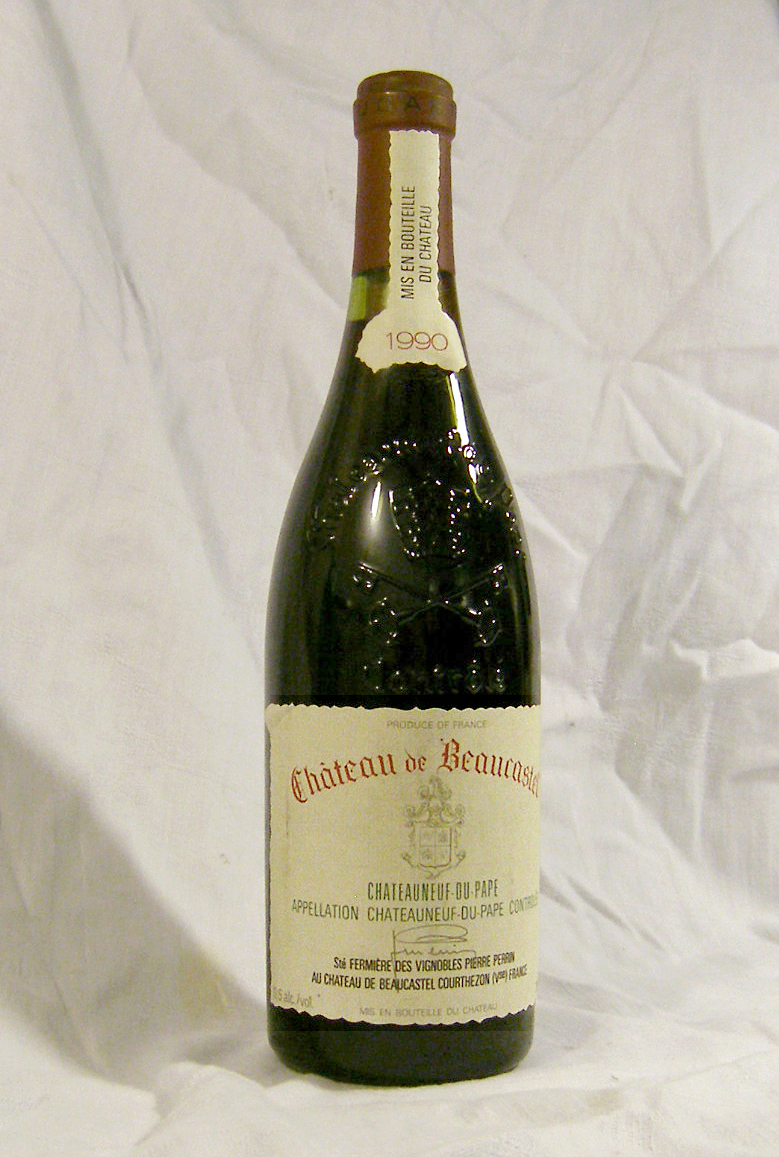
1990 Red Château de Beaucastel

Château de Beaucastel is a winery located in the southern part of the Rhône valley in France, which is primarily noted for its Châteauneuf du Pape wines produced in a long-lived style. For its red Châteauneuf du Pape, Beaucastel includes all 13 grape varieties that are traditionally part of the blend, and uses a higher-than-usual proportion of Mourvèdre. The special Vieilles Vignes cuvée of Beaucastel's white Châteauneuf du Pape is a varietal Roussanne wine, which is rare in Rhône and rarer in Châteauneuf du Pape.

Château de Beaucastel holds a total of 130 hectares (320 acres) of land, of which 100 hectares (250 acres) is planted with vineyards, three-quarters of which is within the Châteauneuf du Pape appellation.

== History ==
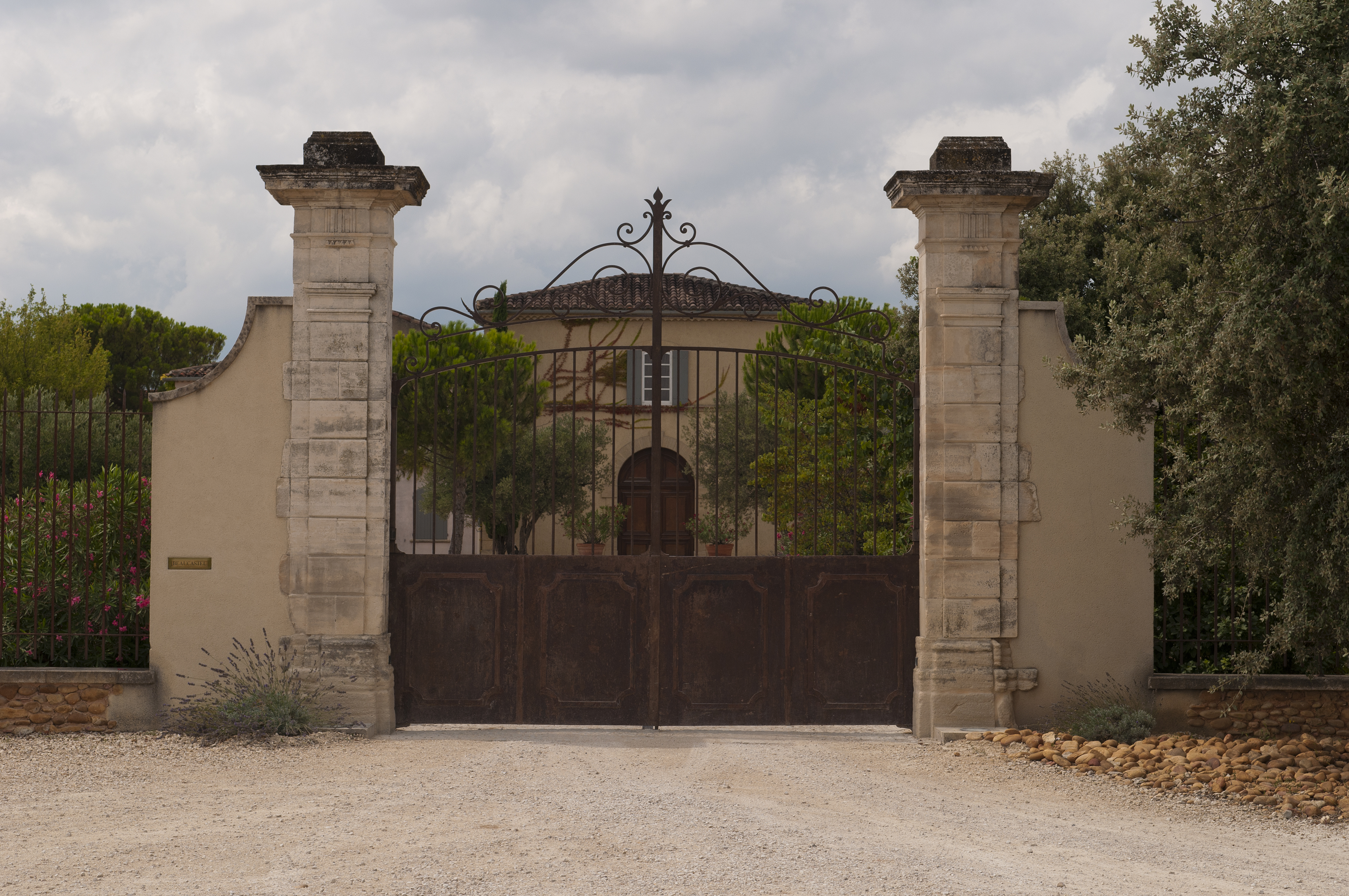
Exterior entrance to the winery

The winery takes its name from the Beaucastel family which lived in Courthézon in the middle of the 16th century. Records show a Pierre de Beaucastel buying a barn and some associated land at Coudoulet in 1549, and this land is still part of Château de Beaucastel's holdings. However, at this time it was an agricultural property. In 1792, the owner was called Etienne Gontard, and the first certain mentioning of vines on the property are from his inheritance 40 years later.

In the 19th century, when the Phylloxera epidemic struck the region, the owner of the domaine was Élie Dussaud, who decided not to replant the vineyards but rather to sell the property. In 1909, it was bought by Pierre Tramier, and the vineyards were rebuilt under his ownership. After him, his son-in-law Pierre Perrin took over, and expanded Château de Beaucastel's vineyard holdings considerably. The property has stayed in the Perrin family since. After Pierre Perrin, Beaucastel was managed by Jacques Perrin until 1978. Since then it has been managed by his sons Jean Pierre Perrin and François Perrin.

In 1990 Jean-Pierre and François Perrin, in collaboration with wine importer Robert Haas, founded Tablas Creek Vineyard within the California viticultural area of Paso Robles. In 2006, the Perrin family and Château de Beaucastel joined Primum Familiae Vini, an association of a limited number of high-end family-owned wineries.

== Vinification ==
Beaucastel generally vinifies the components for its wines in large, old barrels (foudres), with only Syrah grapes exposed to some new oak. The different grape varieties are vinified separately and later blended.

A somewhat contentious aspect of Beaucastel winemaking is that the wines often show Brettanomyces character. While in most cases, this is considered a defect, this character is typical for wines high in Mourvèdre.

== Range ==
The Château de Beaucastel range consists of six wines, of which four are Châteauneuf du Pape and two are Côtes du Rhône:

- Red Château de Beaucastel, a blend of 13 grape varieties with a significant proportion of Mourvèdre.
- White Château de Beaucastel, a blend of 80% Roussanne and 20% Grenache blanc.
- Hommage à Jacques Perrin, a special cuvée red Châteauneuf du Pape produced only in better years. 1989 was the first vintage.
- Roussanne Vieilles Vignes, a white Châteauneuf du Pape from old vine Roussanne.
- Red Coudoulet de Beaucastel, a Côtes du Rhône from vineyards just to the east of the Châteauneuf du Pape appellation border, with a high proportion of Mourvèdre.
- White Coudoulet de Beaucastel, a Côtes du Rhône from vineyards just to the east of the Châteauneuf du Pape appellation border.

== Other Perrin wines ==
The Perrin family is also running a négociant business for other southern Rhône wines, Perrin & Fils. This business is separate from Château de Beaucastel.
