= Julian Brind =

Julian Brind MW (5 November 1942 – 19 December 2010) was a British Master of Wine and director of buying wines, beers, spirits and soft drinks for the Waitrose supermarket chain. Brind was a key figure in the transformation of the British wine trade from the 1970s onwards.

== Career ==
Julian Brind was born in Scotland and educated at Strathallan School in Perthshire. After school he followed his father into the wine and spirits trade joining Brown & Pank, part of Watney Mann Breweries as a management trainee. Brind started buying wine under the direction of Don Lovell MW, who put him forward for the Vintners' Scholarship, which he was awarded in 1967. In the same year he also won the Bourse de Voyage scholarship. In 1970, Brind passed the Master of Wine exam and joined Waitrose to lead the wine buying team in 1971.

When Brind joined Waitrose in the early seventies the wine consumer in Britain was served by the traditional wine merchant selling Old World wine from prestigious European growers. Selling wine in supermarkets was in its infancy. Brind recognised that there was an opportunity to introduce the consumer to new wines from all over the world. In 1973 he was the first buyer to introduce New Zealand Sauvignon blanc to Britain. Nonetheless, Brind did not neglect the traditional European market; instigating the Vin de pays revolution from southern France. So began the interest in New World wine and a cultural shift away from the traditional wine merchant toward the supermarket.

At Waitrose, Brind continued the policy of hiring good buyers and letting them get on with it. By the early 1990s Brind had hired a team of five wine buyers, all of whom were experts in their own field, and Masters of Wine. Under his direction, the 'Waitrose list' became known for its emphasis on individual wines from individual producers. Brind insisted on limiting big brand and own-label wines. He lamented the dominance of the big brands in the market place through deep discounting and the adverse effect it had on the real wine business. For this reason Brind emphasised the need for wine specialists in each store. Thus Waitrose developed a reputation for providing interesting wines, not sold by any other supermarket. Under Brind's stewardship both Waitrose and Brind won numerous domestic and international awards.

Brind held numerous positions within the wine trade: chair of the Masters of Wine Panel of Examiners; chairman of the Institute of Masters of Wine, 1993; ombudsman to the Circle of Wine Writers, 2001; president of the Wine and Spirit Trade Association, 2002 and chairman of the Trustees of the Wine & Spirit Education Trust, 2003.

Since Brind's death several awards and scholarships have been established to commemorate his career in the wine trade. In 2011 The Wine and Spirit Education Trust established The Julian Brind Memorial Scholarship. In the same year the International Wine and Spirit Competition established the Julian Brind Memorial Award for Outstanding Achievement in the Wine Industry. The inaugural trophy was awarded to 'Julian Brind'.
