= Clarence Dillon =

American businessman (1882–1979)

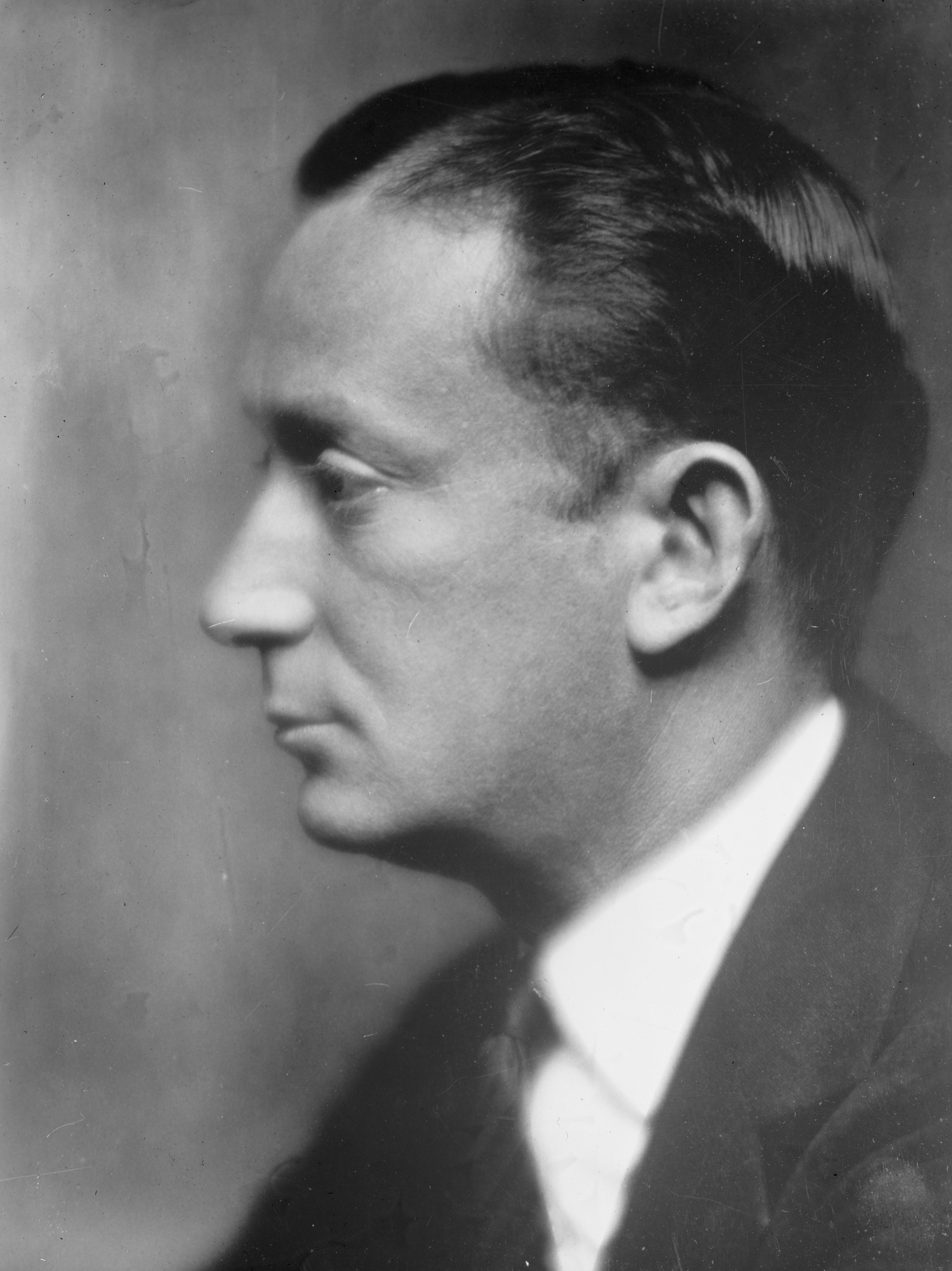
- Born: Clarence Lapowski; September 27, 1882; San Antonio, Texas, U.S.
- Died: April 14, 1979 (aged 96); Far Hills, New Jersey, U.S.
- Citizenship: United States
- Education: Worcester Academy
- Alma mater: Harvard University
- Occupation: investment banker
- Employer: Dillon, Read & Co.
- Spouse: Anne McEldin Douglass (m. 1908; died 1961)
- Children: 2, including C. Douglas

Clarence Dillon (born Clarence Lapowski; September 27, 1882 – April 14, 1979) was an American financier, and namesake of Dillon, Read & Co., an investment bank. In 1957, Fortune Magazine listed Dillon as one of the richest men in the United States, with a fortune then estimated to be from $150 to $200 million.

== Early life ==
Dillon was born Clarence Lapowski. His parents were Bertha Stenbock (1862–1951) and Samuel Lapowski (1848–1912), who emigrated to the United States. Dillon's father was a Polish Jewish immigrant, likely born at Łomża, Poland, in 1848. His paternal grandparents were Joshua Lapowski and Paulina Dylion, the daughter of Michel Dylion, a Frenchman.

In 1878, his father went to San Antonio, Texas, and married Bertha Stenbock one year later. Stenbock was born 1862 in Denver, Colorado, the daughter of Gustav Stenbock, a Swedish immigrant, who was prospecting for lead and silver in the Colorado Western Slope. In 1884, the family moved to Abilene, Texas. They became naturalized citizens in the Abilene District Court, on September 25, 1891, legally changing the family name to Dillon on September 17, 1901. Clarence's father died in San Francisco, California, on June 23, 1912, and his mother died in New York City, on January 1, 1951.

Dillon graduated from Worcester Academy, located in Worcester, Massachusetts, and one of the country's oldest day-boarding schools, and then Harvard University in 1905.

== Career ==
Dillon, Read & Co. Logo

In 1912, Dillon met William A. Read, founder of the Wall Street bond broker firm William A. Read & Company through an introduction by his Harvard classmate, William A. Phillips. Dillon joined Read's Chicago office in that year, later moving to the firm's New York office in 1914. Following Read's death in 1916, Dillon bought a majority interest in the firm and was chosen to head the company. In 1921, the company's name was changed to Dillon, Read & Co.

In 1921, Dillon focused on the beleaguered Goodyear Tire and Rubber Company which was in receivership. He succeeded in crafting a settlement with Goodyear's bankers, creditors, and stockholders as well as raising more than $100 million in funding in an extremely difficult credit market. A lawsuit by previous shareholders alleging that Dillon and his family profited while saddling Goodyear with expensive debt was settled later in 1927. In 1925, Dillon bought the Dodge Brothers Company for $146 million in cash which was the largest such transaction in industrial history at the time. After the acquisition of Dodge, Dillon merged the company with the Chrysler Corporation in 1927 resulting in Chrysler's becoming one of the "big three" in the automobile industry. Dillon also played a significant role in underwriting the expansions of Universal Pictures, Educational Pictures, and Loew's Inc. and Stanton Griffis, Paramount Pictures' chairman of the board, noted that "Clarence Dillon was certainly the greatest financier of our times."

A number of Dillon, Read & Co. partners served in senior roles in government, including Dillon and his right-hand man, James Forrestal, who served as Secretary of the Navy, and later, Secretary of Defense. During World War I, Bernard Baruch, chairman of the War Industries Board, (known as the Czar of American Industry) asked Dillon to be Assistant Chairman of the War Industries Board.

=== Hobbies ===
Dillon was a Francophile both because he had French origins and for his own personal tastes. In 1929, he purchased an apartment in Paris where he stayed a part of each year until he was well into his 80s. An oenophile as well. Dillon negotiated for months to purchase Château Haut-Brion from Bordeaux businessman André Gibert who had controlled the French wine producer since 1923. Dillon ultimately made the acquisition on May 13, 1935, for 2,300,000 francs. Dillon made Seymour Weller, who was the son of his wife's sister, president of the new company, Société Vinicole de la Gironde, (later Domaine Clarence Dillon). Weller retired as president of the company in 1975. Dillon is said to have purchased Château Haut-Brion because it was his favorite wine. However Haut-Brion is also near Bordeaux, and good riding and hunting land surrounds the estate.

Clarence purchased miniature poodle show dog Fontclair Festoon from Dody Jenkins. This dog would go on to win best-in-show at the Westminster Kennel Club in 1959. The dog was handled by Anne Rogers Clark.

== Personal life ==
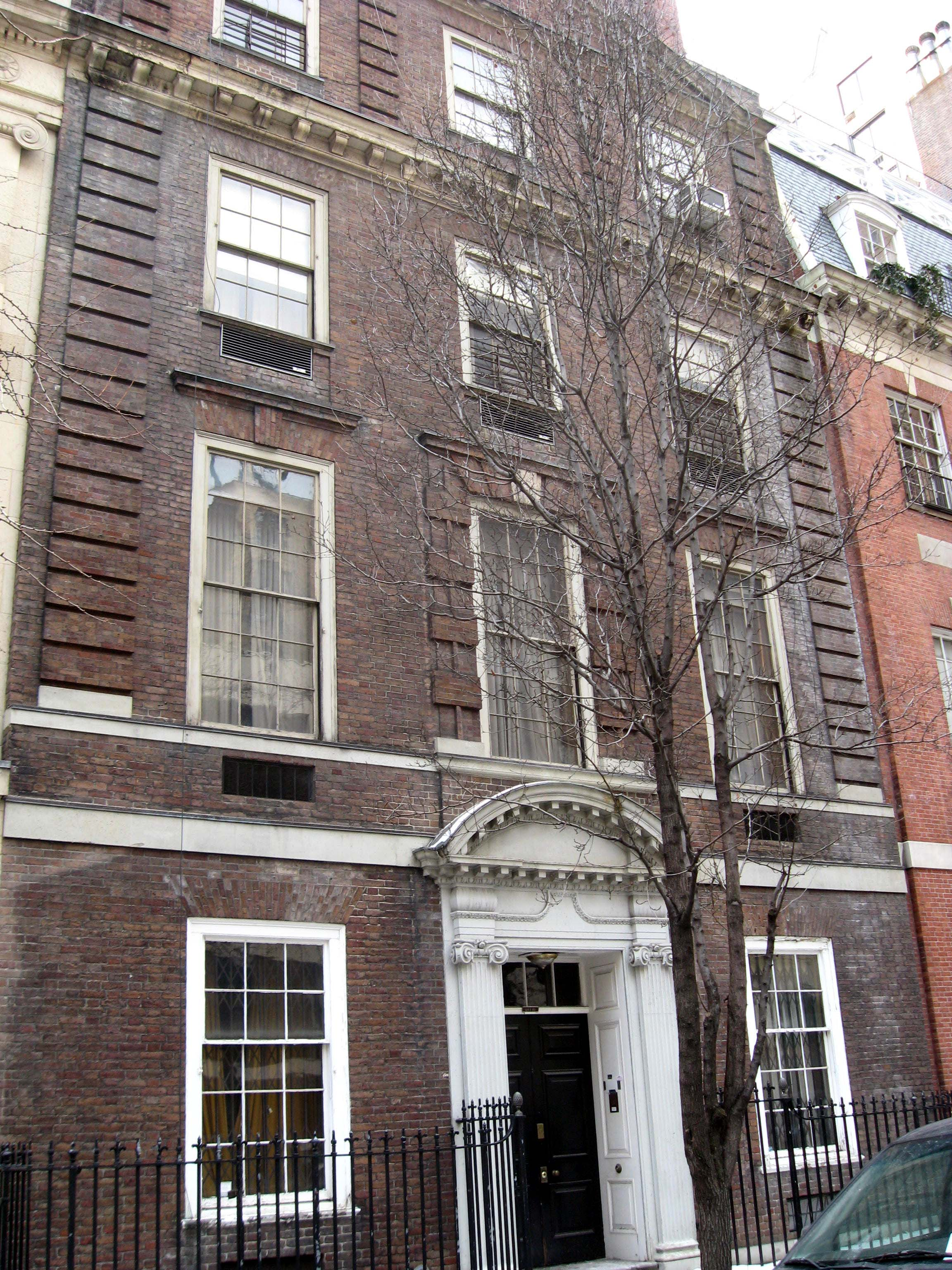
Dillon House, at 124 East 80th Street, Manhattan, built 1930

On February 4, 1908, Dillon married Anne McEldin Douglass (1881–1961) (Note: Anne was born on September 26, 1881, in Peoria, Illinois, and died on November 8, 1961, in Far Hills, New Jersey) in Milwaukee, Wisconsin. Anne was the daughter of George Douglass and his wife and second cousin Susan Virginia Dun. Together, Clarence and Anne were the parents of a son and daughter:

- Clarence Douglass Dillon (Note: The second "s" was later dropped from his middle name.) (1909–2003), who served as the U.S. Secretary of the Treasury from 1961 to 1965 and the U.S. Ambassador to France. He married Phyllis Chess Ellsworth in 1931. After her death in 1982, he married Susan Sage in 1983. They remained married until his death in 2003.
- Dorothy Anne Dillon (1913–2005), who married Philip Elsworth Allen in 1934. After their divorce, she married Dr. Sydney Shepherd Spivack (1907–1969), a sociologist, in 1965. After his death in 1969, she married Eric Eweson in 1976, who died in 1988.

Dillon died on April 14, 1979, at his home in Far Hills, New Jersey.

== Further Reference ==
- Loomis Jr., William R. (2025) The Barron of Wall Street: Clarence Dillon and the Making of the Modern Financial World (Hanover Square Press) ISBN 978-1-335-01643-0
- Geisst, Charles R. (2002) The Last Partnerships: Inside the Great Wall Street Money Dynasties (McGraw-Hill) ISBN 978-0071413176
- Perez, Robert C. and Edward F. Willett (1995) Clarence Dillon, a Wall Street enigma (Madison Press Books) ISBN 9781461713838
- Sobel, Robert (1991) The Life and Times of Dillon Read (The Penguin Group) ISBN 978-0525249597
