= David Peppercorn =

British Master of Wine, French wine importer and author (born 1931)

- Born: 1931 (age 94–95)
- Occupation: Wine writer
- Writing career
- Subject: Wine

David Peppercorn (born 1931) is a British Master of Wine, French wine importer and author, known for his books about the wines of Bordeaux and long experience in his field, having collected tasting notes since the late 1950s. He is married to fellow MW and wine writer Serena Sutcliffe. They were the first husband and wife team to both earn the qualification of Master of Wine. (Peter and Philippa Carr would later join them as the only two husband and wife MW teams.) He has three daughters (Caroline, Sarah and Fanny) by a previous marriage. Peppercorn's books include Bordeaux, The Wines of Bordeaux, The Simon & Schuster Pocket Guide to the Wines of Bordeaux, Mouton-Rothschild 1945, The Wine To End All Wars and Great Vineyards and Winemakers.

== Writings and wine philosophy ==
Frank J. Prial, wine columnist for The New York Times, called Peppercorn "one of England's foremost authorities on Bordeaux". He is a noted critic of the Bordeaux Wine Official Classification of 1855 and the vested interest in the classifications. In his writings on Bordeaux wine estates, Peppercorn regularly focuses on estates that were excluded from the 1855 classification, and maintains that omitted estate Château La Mission Haut-Brion's consistent performance over the last century justifies its classification as a Premier Cru.

== Pétrus imperial bottle controversy ==
In late 1990s, Peppercorn and his wife created controversy when they questioned the authenticity of imperial (6 liter) bottles of Château Pétrus from the 1921, 1924, 1926, 1928 and 1934 vintages that were served at collectors' wine tasting events in 1989 and 1990. The tastings were conducted from the collection of Hardy Rodenstock, a German wine collector who later was embroiled in a counterfeit wine controversy involving a bottle reported belonging to Thomas Jefferson. While Peppercorn's and Sutcliffe's concerns were never proven, and were disputed by Rodenstock, the current manager of Château Pétrus, Christian Moueix, confirmed that the estate has no records of producing imperials during those vintages.

== See also ==
- French wine
- List of wine personalities
