= Chateau Woltner =

Wine estate in Napa Valley, California, US

Coordinates: 38°34′6″N 122°27′32″W

- Location: Angwin, California, US
- Appellation: Howell Mountain AVA
- Founded: 1877

Chateau Woltner, formerly Nouveau Medoc Vineyard, was a California wine estate located near Angwin, California, in the Howell Mountain AVA within Napa Valley, which in the modern era was operational between 1980 and 2000 before its sale and merge into Ladera Vineyards.

== History ==
The estate was established in 1877 by two Frenchmen, Jean Brun and W.J. Chaix who were among the first to plant vineyards up on Howell Mountain instead of on the Napa Valley floor and were California's thirteenth registered winery, who labeled the wines as Nouveau Medoc Vineyard. The stone winery was built in 1886.

The estate was bought in 1980 by Francis and Françoise DeWavrin. Françoise DeWavrin née Woltner is the granddaughter of Fréderic Otto Woltner whose Château La Mission Haut-Brion rose in reputation under his and the management of his innovative sons Fernand and Henri. The DeWavrins ran La Mission for a number of years after the death of the Woltner brothers in 1974 until the estate was sold in 1983, and the DeWavrins concentrated on the estate renamed Chateau Woltner, producing their first vintage in 1985.

=== Sale ===
Upon the decision of Francis and Françoise DeWavrin-Woltner to retire, Chateau Woltner was sold to Pat and Anne Stotesbery, owners of Ladera Vineyards, in August 2000. The new owners declared plans to refurbish the winery and replace the Chardonnay vines with red Bordeaux grape varieties.

== Production ==
From an estate of 181 acres (73 ha), the vineyard area were dedicated to 53 acres (21 ha) planted with Chardonnay and 15 acres (6.1 ha) of Cabernet Sauvignon.

The production included three vineyard designated Chardonnays named Titus, Frederique and St. Thomas that were produced in a non-malolactic style, with the excess fruit made into a Howell Mountain Chardonnay. In 1995 the estate produced its first Cabernet-based red wine, the Private Reserve Red Howell Mountain.

The estate had an annual production of 10,000 to 12,000 cases (900 to 1,080 hL) per year.
