= Château Quintus =

- Coordinates: 44.8849°N 0.1719°W
- Wine region: Bordeaux
- Appellation: Saint-Émilion
- Formerly: Château Tertre Daugay
- Area cultivated: 15 hectares (37 acres)
- Cases/yr: 5000
- Known for: Château Quintus (Grand vin); Le Dragon de Quintus (second)
- Varietals: Merlot, Cabernet Franc
- Website: www.chateau-quintus.com

Château Quintus, is a wine estate of 15 ha located in Saint-Émilion, in the AOC of the same name. Formerly named Château Tertre Daugay, a Classified Growth of Saint-Émilion, it is the property of Quintus SAS, a subsidiary of Domaine Clarence Dillon SAS.

From the 2011 vintage, the grand vin is called Château Quintus and the second wine, Le Dragon de Quintus.

== History ==
During the summer 2011, Château Quintus was purchased by Domaine Clarence Dillon. Domaine Clarence Dillon named its new property after the Gallo-Roman tradition of naming their fifth child Quintus. For almost a century, the Bordeaux reference book Cocks and Feret mentioned the property as a First Growth of Saint-Emilion. The property also received a gold medal at the Exposition Universelle de Paris in 1867. The first known owner of Château Quintus was Pierre-Philippe Alezais, who belonged to a wealthy family in Saint-Emilion. After the French Revolution, his descendant Philippe Alezais developed the vineyard and brought the estate to the size of today. In the late 19th century, the Alezais family sold the estate to Eugène Robin, banker and also owner of chateau L'Ermitage in Libourne. In the 1930s, when Saint-Emilion was suffering from the international economic crisis, Léon Galhaud, owner of several Saint-Emilion properties, bought Château Quintus. His son, Jean-Jacques, ran into financial problems in 1967 and finally sold the estate in 1978 to Count Leo de Malet Roquefort. Quintus was run by the Malet Roquefort family for 30 years until the Dillon family bought the estate in 2011. In 2013, the Dillon family acquired Château L'Arrosée next to Château Quintus and included the vineyard in the one of Château Quintus.

== Vineyard ==
The property is located on a high promontory which is the end of the plateau of Saint-Emilion. The terroir includes various slopes, soils and orientation. It is planted with merlot and cabernet-franc. In “Les Grands vins de Gironde”, FG Dumas wrote in 1899: “One cannot imagine a more beautiful situation for an estate, or one more favourable for the production of a First Growth wine. […] Thanks to the excellent vinification practices undertaken at this estate, the wine produced here reflects great body, ripeness and an armature that exemplify the great wines of Saint-Emilion.” Since the purchase of the estate, Domaine Clarence Dillon implemented some improvements: sorting of the grapes during the harvest, in-depth research for a new style of wine during the blending process.

== Wines ==
Château Quintus is the grand vin. 2011 is the first vintage entirely produced by Domaine Clarence Dillon. It is a blend of 51% Merlot and 49% Cabernet Franc. Le Dragon of Quintus is the second wine. It is a blend of 54% Merlot and 46% Cabernet Franc. Because of its selection criteria, only 65 barrels of 2011 Château Quintus (1,625 cases) and 66 of 2011 Le Dragon de Quintus (1,650 cases) are available.

On May 15, 2011, Domaine Clarence Dillon released for the en-primeur 1,000 cases of Château Quintus and 1,000 cases of Le Dragon de Quintus.
