= Master of Wine =

One of the highest qualifications for wine knowledge

Master of Wine (MW) is a qualification (not an academic degree) issued by The Institute of Masters of Wine in the United Kingdom. The MW qualification is generally regarded in the wine industry as one of the highest standards of professional knowledge.

The Institute was founded in 1955, and the MW examinations were first arranged in 1953 by the Worshipful Company of Vintners and the Wine and Spirits Association.

== Qualification ==
Prospective students must hold an advanced wine qualification, at least Diploma level from the Wine & Spirit Education Trust, or an appropriately high level sommelier certificate, such as Advanced Sommelier from the Court of Master Sommeliers, and have a minimum of three years' professional work experience in the global wine community. Their application must be supported by reference from a Master of Wine or another senior wine trade professional. The qualification process takes at least three years to complete, involves both theory and practical work, and culminates in writing a research paper of 6,000–10,000 words.

== Membership ==
Until 1983, the examination was limited to United Kingdom wine importers, merchants and retailers. The first non-UK Master of Wine was awarded in 1988. As of March 2021, there are 416 MWs in the world, living in 31 countries. The MWs are spread across 5 continents, wherein the UK has 208 MWs, US has 45 MWs, Australia has 24 MWs and France has 16 MWs. There are 9 countries with 1 MW each on the list.

Today, members hold a range of occupations including winemakers, viticulturists, winemaking consultants, wine writers and journalists, wine educators, and wine service, restaurant and hotel management. In addition, many are involved in the purchasing, importing, distribution, sales and marketing of wine.

== Notable Masters of Wine ==
Notable Masters of Wine include:

- Tim Atkin
- Gerard Basset
- Nicolas Belfrage
- Julian Brind
- Michael Broadbent
- Clive Coates
- Mary Ewing-Mulligan
- Doug Frost
- Ned Goodwin
- Anthony Hanson
- Benjamin Lewin
- Brian McGrath
- Debra Meiburg
- Jasper Morris
- David Peppercorn
- Lisa Perrotti-Brown
- Jancis Robinson
- Arne Ronold
- Serena Sutcliffe
- Jennifer Docherty
- Sonal Holland

== See also ==
- List of wine personalities
