= Château La Tour Haut-Brion =

Château La Tour Haut-Brion was a Bordeaux wine estate from the Pessac-Léognan appellation within Graves, and was ranked as a Cru Classé for red wine in the Classification of Graves wine of 1953 and 1959. It was located in close vicinity of the city of Bordeaux, in the commune of Talence, adjoining Château La Mission Haut-Brion.

The estate's final vintage was 2005, after the owners (Domaine Clarence Dillon) decided to discontinue the label. Since then, the fruit from La Tour Haut-Brion has been used in the production of Château La Mission Haut-Brion.

== History ==
Vines were first laid into the ground by the Rostaing family in the 16th century, when the estate was called La Tour de Rostaing, or La Tour d'Esquivens, who also cultivated the vineyards of Arrejedhuys, which became La Mission Haut-Brion. At the onset of the French Revolution the estate belonged to the Saige family. Despite the execution of the estate's heir, his mother the widow Saige refused to evacuate the château, and expropriation of the estate was avoided.

Not until the 19th century did the owners at the time, the Cayrou brothers, add the name of 'Haut-Brion'. Records show that by the 1850 Féret, the full name of La Tour Haut-Brion was acknowledged.

It was acquired by Louis Uzac in 1858 who made restorations and several modernising changes, and in 1890 it was sold to Victor Coustau. After Coustau's death in 1924, the Woltner family, proprietors of neighbouring vineyards Château la Mission Haut-Brion and Château Laville Haut-Brion, ran the wine production for the widow Coustau, and after her death in 1935 she left them the estate in her will.

The brothers Fernand and Henri Woltner were known for innovative methods, and the latter was described as a "wine-making genius". In the 1953 classification of Graves, Château La Tour Haut-Brion was rated a Cru Classé, and by the mid-1960s, the estate amassed 10 acres (4.0 ha) and produced 1,000 cases annually.

Following the death of the Woltner brothers in 1974, the property was under the administration of the Dewavrins, and it was suggested by David Peppercorn that they treated the estate as a second wine for La Mission. They eventually sold their estates in 1983 to the Dillon Family, owners of Château Haut-Brion since 1935, uniting four Haut-Brion chateaux under Domaine Clarence Dillon. Then caretaker Jean Delmas decided to again treat La Tour Haut-Brion as a separate distinct cru.

=== Discontinuation ===
In April 2007 however, Domaine Clarence Dillon announced that beginning with the 2006 vintage, the grapes from the La Tour Haut-Brion vineyards would be blended into La Chapelle de La Mission Haut-Brion, the second wine of La Mission Haut-Brion, and as the vines become older, potentially used for the grand vin of La Mission. The decision effectively made 2005 the final vintage of La Tour Haut-Brion, and rendered one of Domaine Clarence Dillon's oldest estates defunct.

== Production ==
The vineyard area extended nearly 5 hectares (12 acres) with the grape variety distribution of 42% Cabernet Sauvignon, 23% Merlot, and 35% Cabernet Franc. La Tour Haut-Brion annually produced on average 2,000 to 2,500 cases (180 to 220 hL) during its final period as a distinct estate.
