= Commission on Private Philanthropy and Public Needs =

The Commission on Private Philanthropy and Public Needs, better known as the Filer Commission, was formed in 1973 to study philanthropy, the role of the private sector in American society, and then to recommend measures to increase voluntary giving. Organized as a privately supported citizen's board, the Commission came into being through the efforts of John D. Rockefeller III, Wilbur D. Mills, George P. Shultz, and William E. Simon. The selection of participants on the Commission reflected a desire for diversity of experience and opinions and included heads of religious and labor groups, former cabinet secretaries, corporate and Foreign Securities Corporation and President of Metropolitan Museum of Art.

1. Edwin D. Etherington, Former President of Wesleyan University and Trustee of Alfred P. Sloan Foundation.
2. Bayard Ewing, Tillinghast, Collins and Graham and Vice Chairman of United Way of America.
3. Frances Tarlton Farenthold, Past Chairperson of National Women's Political Caucus.
4. Max M. Fisher, Chairman of United Brands Company and Honorary Chairman of United Foundations.
5. Reverend Raymond J. Gallagher, Bishop of Lafayette-in-Indiana.
6. Earl G. Graves, Publisher of Black Enterprise and Commissioner of Boy Scouts of America.
7. Paul R. Haas, President and Chairman of Corpus Christi Oil and Gas Company and Trustee of Paul and Mary Haas Foundation.
8. Walter A. Haas Jr., Chairman of Levi Strauss and Company and Trustee of the Ford Foundation.
9. Philip M. Klutznick, Klutznick Investments and Chairman of Research and Policy Committee and Trustee of Committee for Economic Development.
10. Ralph Lazarus, Chairman of Federated Department Stores, Inc. and Former National Chairman of United Way of America.
11. Herbert E. Longenecker, President Emeritus of Tulane University and Director of United Student Aid Funds.
12. Elizabeth J. McCormack, Special Assistant to the President of Rockefeller Brothers Fund, Inc.
13. Walter J. McNerney, President of Blue Cross Association.
14. William H. Morton, Trustee of Dartmouth College.
15. John M. Musser, President and Director of General Service Foundation.
16. Jon O. Newman, Judge, U.S. District Court and Chairman of Hartford Institute of Criminal and Social Justice.
17. Graciela Olivarez, State Planning Officer and Director of Council on Foundations, Inc.
18. Alan Pifer, President of Carnegie Corporation of New York.
19. George Romney, Chairman of the National Center for Voluntary Action.
20. William Matson Roth, Regent of University of California and Chairman of San Francisco Museum of Art.
21. Althea T. L. Simmons, Director for Education Programs of the NAACP Special Contribution Fund.
22. Reverend Leon H. Sullivan, Pastor of Zion Baptist Church, Philadelphia.
23. David B. Truman, President of Mount Holyoke College.

== Findings ==
The Commission sought to gain knowledge about philanthropy and the motivations for giving in a variety of ways. An advisory panel of more than 100 specialists in the disciplines of economics, sociology, and law, together with advocates from the non-profit sector, directed the commission's research focus. In the span of two years, the Commission directed more than 86 research projects concerning philanthropy and the role of the private nonprofit sector in the United States. These studies were crucial to the discussion and debate which took place during the Commission meetings that would later lead to the formation of policy recommendations. Conducted in specific areas such as arts and culture, health, education, taxation and regulation, foreign practices, and foundations in general, the studies provided the background information necessary to make sound decisions about the role of philanthropy in both the public and private sectors. The Commission dealt with the difficult political, social, and economic issues confronting the sector during the early 1970s, particularly its fiscal problems and the growing political opposition to charitable tax deductions.

After two years of holding meeting sessions and conducting research projects, the Commission issued its findings in its final report, Giving in America: Toward a Stronger Voluntary Sector, and closed its work in 1975. The Commission focused public attention on the sector and spurred academic inquiry into the field of philanthropy, charting the course of research for the following two decades. Its work was the first major investigation of the third sector and the most comprehensive examination of philanthropy to date. From its recommendations, the Independent Sector coalition was formed and emerged as one of the nation's most powerful advocates of non-profit organizations. After the publication of the final report, the commission had completed its task. The Commission officially disbanded after the report's publication in 1975.

The findings of the commission were:

- The voluntary sector is a large and vital part of American society, more important today than ever. But the sector is undergoing economic strains that predate and are generally more severe than the troubles of the economy as a whole.
- Giving in America involves an immense amount of time and money, is the fundamental underpinning of the voluntary sector, encompasses a wide diversity of relationships between donor, donations and donee, and is not keeping pace.
- Decreasing levels of private giving, increasing costs of nonprofit activity and broadening expectations for health, education and welfare services as basic entitlements of citizenship have led to the government's becoming a principal provider of programs and revenues in many areas once dominated by private philanthropy. And government's growing role in these areas poses fundamental questions about the autonomy and basic functioning of private nonprofit organizations and institutions.
- Our society has long encouraged "charitable" nonprofit activity by excluding it from certain tax obligations. But the principal tax encouragement of giving to nonprofit organizations - the charitable deduction in personal include taxes - has been both challenged from some quarters in recent years on grounds of equity and eroded by expansion of the standard deduction.

The Commission offered several recommendations to the public, foundations, and the government. It recommended:

- That all taxpayers who take the standard deduction should also be permitted to deduct charitable contributions as an additional, itemized deduction.
- That families with incomes below $15,000 a year be allowed to deduct twice the amount of their giving, and those with incomes between $15,000 and $30,000 be allowed to deduct 150 per cent of what they contribute.
- That corporations set as a minimum goal, to be reached no later than 1980, the giving to charitable purposes of 2 per cent of pretax net income, and that further studies of means to stimulate corporate giving be pursued.
- That all larger tax-exempt charitable organizations except churches and church affiliates be required to prepare and make readily available detailed annual reports on their finances, programs and priorities.
- That larger grant-making organizations be required to hold annual public meetings to discuss their programs, priorities and contributions.
- That legal responsibility for proper expenditure of foundation grants, now imposed on both foundations and recipients, be eliminated and the recipient organization be made primarily responsible for their own expenditures.
- That tax-exempt organizations, particularly funding organizations, recognize an obligation to be responsive to changing viewpoints and emerging needs and that they take steps such as broadening their boards and staffs to insure that they are responsive.
- That all tax-exempt organizations be required to maintain "arms-length" business relationships with profit-making organizations or activities in which any principal of the exempt organization has a financial interest.
- That a system of federal regulation be established for interstate charitable solicitations and that intrastate solicitations be more effectively regulated by state governments.
- That nonprofit organizations, other than private foundations, be allowed the same freedom to attempt to influence legislation as are business corporations and trade associations, that toward this end Congress remove the current limitation on such activity by charitable groups eligible to receive tax-deductible gifts.
- That a permanent national commission on the nonprofit sector be established by Congress.

The above Findings and Recommendations were taken from the finding aid for the Commission on Private Philanthropy and Public Needs, 1964–1980, at Ruth Lilly Special Collections and Archives, IUPUI University Library, Indiana University Purdue University Indianapolis.
