= Château Laville Haut-Brion =

French white wine (1611-2010)

Coordinates: 44.8152°N 0.6053°W

Château Laville Haut-Brion was a Bordeaux dry white wine from the Pessac-Léognan appellation, which was ranked among the Crus Classés in the Classification of Graves wine of 1953. The estate is located in close vicinity of the city of Bordeaux, in the commune of Talence.

Since 2009, the fruit from Laville Haut-Brion has been used in the production of Château La Mission Haut-Brion Blanc.

== History ==
Originally acquired in 1611 by Marie de Laville, widow of Sir de Queyrac, the estate remained in the family for over a hundred years, until it was sold in 1717 to Bernard Gaussens. The winery changed ownership several times until 1931 when Leopold Bibonne sold the property to the Frédéric-Otto Woltner, owner of neighbouring estates Château La Mission Haut-Brion and Château La Tour Haut-Brion. His sons Fernand and Henri Woltner were innovative vintners and produced a dry white wine considered the best in Graves, among the reasons behind the latter's reputation as a "wine-making genius". Henri Woltner described the wine as able to be drunk after five years, but seldom at its best before ten years. Its slow-maturing characteristics have been compared to the best of white Burgundies, and the richness akin to a fine Montrachet.

In the 1953 classification of Graves, Château Laville Haut-Brion was rated a Premier Cru as the only of the classed chateaux to be exclusive producers of white wine, and by the mid-1960s, the estate amassed 4 hectares (9.9 acres) and produced 2,400 cases annually.

Following the death of the Woltner brothers in 1974, the production was managed by Françoise Woltner and Francis DeWavrin until the family eventually sold their estates in 1983 to the Dillon Family, owners of Château Haut-Brion since 1935, uniting four Haut-Brion chateaux under Domaine Clarence Dillon. Managed by Jean-Bernard Delmas the reputation of the estate was preserved, and he was succeeded by his son Jean-Philippe Delmas.

=== Discontinuation ===
In March 2010 it was announced that wine would cease to be bottled under the name Château Laville Haut-Brion, and beginning with the 2009 vintage, the wine be labelled as Château La Mission Haut-Brion Blanc.

== Production ==
During the final stage of the Laville Haut-Brion era, the vineyard area extended 3.5 hectares (8.6 acres) with a grape variety distribution of 70% Sémillon 27% Sauvignon blanc and 3% Muscadelle. Of the grand vin Château Laville Haut-Brion there was annually produced an average 1,000 cases (90 hL) of dry white wine.
