= Château La Mission Haut-Brion =

Bordeaux wine

Coordinates: 44.81539°N 0.60565°W

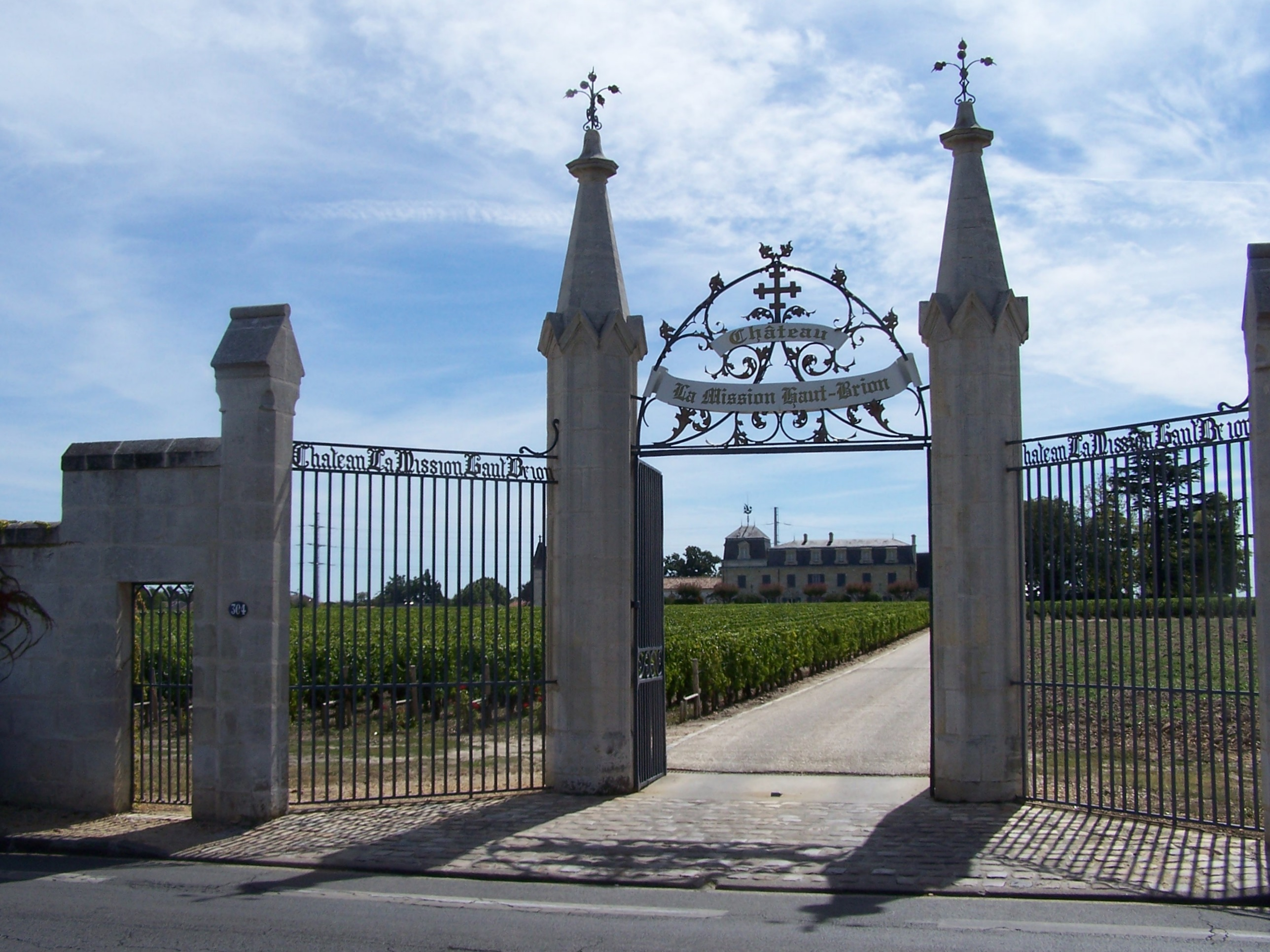
Château La Mission Haut-Brion

Château La Mission Haut-Brion 1990

Château la Mission Haut-Brion is a Bordeaux wine from the Pessac-Léognan appellation, classed among the Crus Classés in the Graves classification of 1953. La Mission Haut-Brion is the sister property of the First Growth Château Haut-Brion. The winery, located in close vicinity of the city of Bordeaux, belongs to the wine region Graves, in the commune of Talence with additional property in Pessac.

The château also produces a second wine from younger vines, La Chapelle de la Mission, since the 1991 vintage, and the dry white wine Château La Mission Haut-Brion Blanc since the 2010 merger of Château Laville Haut-Brion.

== History ==
In the early 16th century, the land belonged to the family de Rostaing, of the house of de la Tour d'Esquivens, then called Arrejedhuys, planted with vines before it was passed to the Lestonnac family in 1540. In 1650, Olive de Lestonnac bequeathed an annuity to a religious order for their works of Christian charity in the countryside around Bordeaux. Her daughter-in-law, Catherine de Mullet, was the executor of Olive's will and the annuity was settled on the Congregation for the Clergy, then transferred, in 1682, to the Lazarists Fathers. The priests cultivated grapes for nearly 130 years, until the French Revolution, leaving behind monastic foundations that were expropriated by the state. It was acquired by Martial-Victor Vaillant in November 1792 for 302,000 livres, and for nearly one hundred years it was owned by the Chiapella family.

In 1919 it was sold by Victor Coustau to Fréderic Otto Woltner. Woltner's sons, Fernand and Henri, considered innovators of viticulture, restructured the vineyards to yield better grapes. Henri Woltner who became manager of the estate in 1921, in addition to being credited as having pioneered the use of glass lined tanks in the vinification process in 1926, came to be known as a "wine-maker genius".

For many years considered the chief challenger to its historically more significant close neighbour Château Haut-Brion, La Mission Haut-Brion sold wines at high prices, but this was considered justified as they "produced some remarkable bottles". The prolific Woltners ran operations at the neighbouring Château La Tour Haut-Brion for the widow Marie Coustau since her husband's death in 1923, who upon her death in 1933 left the chateau to the Woltner family in her will, and in 1931 the Woltners had acquired the nearby Château Laville Haut-Brion where they produced a dry white wine considered one of the best in Graves.

After the death of Henri Woltner in 1974 and his brother shortly after, the estate was run by Françoise Woltner and Francis DeWavrin, daughter and son-in-law of Fernand Woltner. Though standards were maintained, family discord led to the sale of the estate, along with La Tour Haut-Brion and Laville Haut-Brion in 1983, to Domaine Clarence Dillon, owners of Château Haut-Brion since 1935 while the DeWavrins moved on to run Chateau Woltner in Howell Mountain AVA. Although the historical competition between Haut-Brion and La Mission has been absent in recent years, through the supervision of manager Jean-Bernard Delmas, and later Jean-Philippe Delmas, the original terroir of the vineyards has been upheld and La Mission has remained distinctive.

American wine critic Robert Parker awarded the maximum one hundred points for the 2000 La Mission Haut Brion, making it six occasions Parker has given the estate this score. Jancis Robinson, MW describes La Mission as "the quintessential insider's wine" while David Peppercorn, MW holds the estate's consistent performance over the last century as justification to classify La Mission as a Premier Cru, as was done to Château Mouton Rothschild in 1973. In 2009, the Liv-ex Bordeaux Classification considered Château La Mission Haut-Brion as a potential First Growth along with Château Mouton Rothschild and the four estates classified in 1855: Château Haut-Brion, Château Margaux, Château Lafite-Rothschild, and Château Latour.

=== Estate mergers ===
With an aim to simplify the number of wines produced, Domaine Clarence Dillon decided that the grapes from the La Tour Haut-Brion vineyards would be blended into La Chapelle de La Mission Haut-Brion starting with the 2006 vintage, and as the vines become older, use them for the production of the grand vin.

In March 2010, it was announced that the wine of Château Laville Haut-Brion would cease to be bottled under that label, and instead produced under the name Château La Mission Haut-Brion Blanc, beginning with the 2009 vintage.

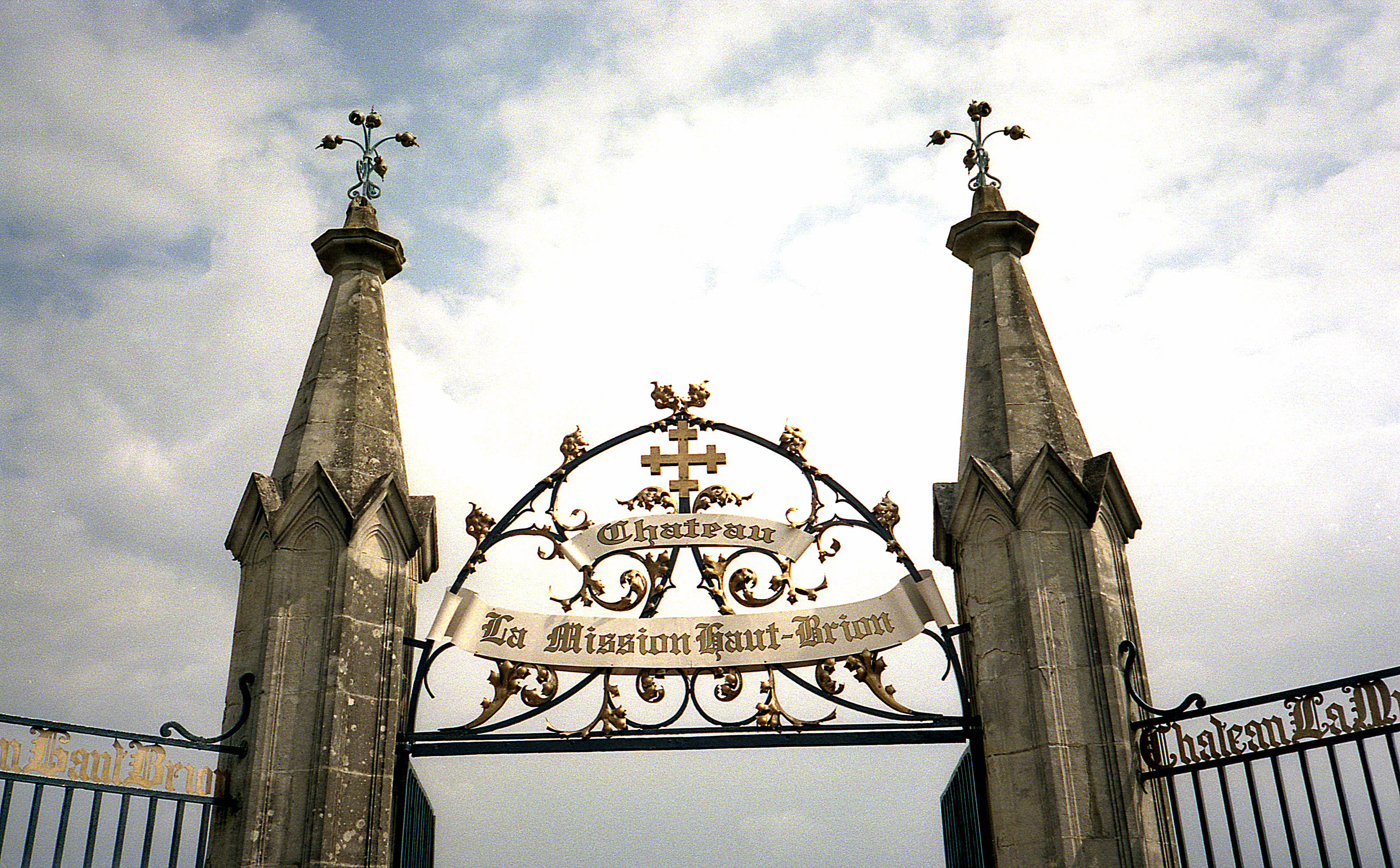
The gates of La Mission Haut-Brion.

== Production ==
Situated on stony soil, the vineyard area extends nearly 21 hectares (52 acres) between the two portions in Pessac and Léognan, with a grape variety distribution of 48% Cabernet Sauvignon, 45% Merlot, and 7% Cabernet Franc.

The estate annually produces on average 6,000 to 7,000 cases (540 to 630 hL) of its grand vin La Mission Haut-Brion. For the second wine La Chapelle de la Mission, from the vineyard's youngest vines, there is produced on average 4,000 cases (360 hL). The white Château La Mission Haut-Brion Blanc, previously the wine of Château Laville Haut-Brion, has an annual production of 500 to 700 cases (45 to 63 hL).
