= List of Pratt Institute alumni =

The Pratt Institute is a private college in Brooklyn, New York. Following is a list of some of its notable alumni.

== Academia ==
- Emery Bopp, artist and long-time chairman of the Division of Art at Bob Jones University
- Mary Godfrey, artist, first full-time African-American faculty member at Penn State University
- Thomas J.R. Hughes, professor of aerospace engineering and engineering mechanics at the University of Texas at Austin
- Susan A. Hutchinson (1873–1945), librarian of the Brooklyn Museum
- Irvin Leigh Matus, independent scholar, autodidact, author, authority on Shakespeare
- Susan L. Talbott, curator and director of the Wadsworth Atheneum and director of Smithsonian Arts at the Smithsonian Institution

== Architecture ==
- Martin L. Beck, architect
- Richard Foster, architect
- Henry Hohauser, architect
- Malcolm Holzman, architect
- Fay Kellogg, architect
- Johannes Knoops, architect
- Edward Mazria, architect
- George Ranalli, architect
- Wallace Rayfield, architect
- Mott B. Schmidt, architect
- Annabelle Selldorf, architect
- Peter L. Shelton, architect
- Edward Townsend Howes, architect and artist
- William Van Alen, architect
- Lorenzo Snow Young, architect
- Carlos Zapata, architect
- Peter Zumthor, architect

== Art ==
=== Comic ===
- Dave Berg, cartoonist known for his work in Mad
- Rich Burlew, graphic designer known for The Order of the Stick webcomic
- Bernard Chang, artist and designer best known for his work in the comic book industry
- Daniel Clowes, cartoonist and writer
- Gus Edson, cartoonist
- Jules Feiffer, Pulitzer Prize in 1986 for editorial cartooning
- Bill Griffith, cartoonist best known for his surreal daily comic strip Zippy
- Jack Kirby, comic book artist
- Marcus McLaurin, comic book writer and editor
- Mort Meskin, comic book artist
- Martin Nodell, comic creator
- Mike Roy, comic book and comic strip artist
- Samm Schwartz, Archie comics illustrator
- Gordon A. Sheehan, cartoonist
- Leonard Starr, cartoonist
- George Wilson, cover artist for Gold Key Comics

=== Fashion ===
- Jeffrey Banks, fashion designer
- Donna Chambers, jewelry designer
- Ben de Lisi, fashion designer
- Betsey Johnson, fashion designer
- Vera Maxwell, fashion designer
- Norman Norell, fashion designer
- Jeremy Scott, fashion designer
- Marie Zimmermann, jewelry designer and metalworker

=== Fine arts ===
- Marshall Arisman, painter
- Imna Arroyo, painter
- David Ascalon, sculptor
- Leigh Behnke, painter
- Aisha Tandiwe Bell, visual artist
- Trudy Benson, painter
- Willard Bond, painter
- Paul Calle, artist
- Aurore Chabot, ceramist
- Sam Chinkes, sculptor, painter
- Theresa Chromati, painter
- Lady Bird Cleveland, painter
- Margaret Miller Cooper, painter
- Victoria de Lesseps, artist
- Louis Delsarte, artist
- Jason Freeny, artist specializing in sculpture, designer toys and computer-generated imagery
- Ann Gillen, sculptor
- Félix González-Torres, conceptual artist
- Jim Hodges, artist
- Robert Leroy Hodge, artist
- Candy Jernigan, multimedia artist, graphic designer, and set designer
- Ellsworth Kelly, painter, sculptor, and printmaker
- Lili Lakich, artist
- Greer Lankton, artist
- Greg Lindquist, painter
- Kermit Love, puppet designer
- Gina Lucia, art director, artist, and designer
- Vivian Schuyler Key, painter, sculptor, printmaker, designer, and illustrator
- Philomena Marano, artist
- Soraya Marcano, visual artist
- Peter Max, artist
- Conor Mccreedy, artist
- Cheryl D. Miller, graphic designer and artist, AIGA Medalist 2021
- Sergio Rossetti Morosini, artist and writer
- Cyrilla Mozenter, artist
- Marilyn Nance, artist
- David Nyzio, sculptor
- John Pai, sculptor
- Roxy Paine, painter and sculptor
- Agnes Lawrence Pelton, painter
- Denis Peterson, painter
- Charles E. Pont, artist
- Reeva Potoff, artist and educator
- Albert John Pucci, artist
- David Ratcliff, painter
- Nicholas Reale, painter
- Edna Reindel, painter
- Willy Bo Richardson, artist
- Mario Robinson, painter
- Stefan Sagmeister, artist
- Jenny Scobel, painter
- Barbara Segal, sculptor and stone carver
- Joan Semmel, painter
- Hadieh Shafie, visual artist
- Nat Mayer Shapiro, painter
- Susan Louise Shatter, painter
- Jean Shin, sculptor
- Joseph A. Smith, artist
- Therman Statom, studio glass artist
- Susanne Suba, artist
- Eliza Swann, artist
- Swoon, graffiti artist
- Mickalene Thomas, painter
- Salman Toor, artist
- Boaz Vaadia, sculptor
- Jacob van Schalkwyk, visual artist, drawing major
- Robert Vargas, artist
- Max Weber, painter
- William T. Williams, painter
- Terry Winters, painter
- Robert Yasuda, visual artist

=== Illustration and graphic design ===
- Ken Bald, illustrator
- C. C. Beall, illustrator and painter
- Steven Belledin, fantasy illustrator and oil painter
- Rajie Cook, graphic designer
- Frances W. Delehanty, artist and illustrator
- Cat Frazier, graphic designer and blogger
- Wendy Anderson Halperin, illustrator and author
- Cheryl Hanna, painter, and children's book illustrator, also known for her work in the medium of collage
- Jeremy Jarvis, illustrator and creative director known for Magic: The Gathering
- George Lois, art director and designer known for over 92 covers for Esquire magazine
- Earl Mayan, illustrator
- Jacqui Morgan, illustrator and painter
- Kadir Nelson, illustrator, known for his covers of The New Yorker magazine
- Roberto Parada, illustrator known for creating paintings for magazines
- Paul Rand, graphic designer
- Robert Sabuda, illustrator
- Bernard Safran, painter and illustrator known for magazine covers
- Sam Savitt, illustrator and writer, official artist of U.S. Equestrian Team
- Helen Sewell, illustrator and writer
- Rob Sheridan, graphic designer
- Louis Silverstein, graphic designer
- Pamela Colman Smith, illustrator of the Rider–Waite tarot deck
- Rupert Jasen Smith, silk screen printer and artist
- Frank Verlizzo, theater poster designer and Drama Desk Award winner
- Ernest William Watson, artist, illustrator and teacher
- Kent Williams, painter and graphic novel artist
- Lance Wyman, graphic designer

=== Photography ===
- Robert King, photojournalist
- Robert Mapplethorpe, photographer
- Wendy McMurdo, photographer
- Joseph Szabo, photographer
- Barbra Walz, fashion photographer

== Business ==
- Donald Genaro, industrial designer and president of Henry Dreyfuss Associates
- Bruce Hannah, industrial designer and educator
- Charles Pollock, industrial designer who created sleek furniture
- David Sarnoff, president of conglomerate of telecommunications and media companies, including RCA and NBC
- Tony Schwartz, pioneering media theorist and advertising creator
- Fred Trump, real estate developer

== Entertainment ==
- Alexandra Amon, actress, screenwriter, and film producer
- Joseph Barbera, animator and cartoonist
- André Baruch, radio announcer and film narrator
- Guy Bolton, playwright and writer of musical comedies
- Alfred Mosher Butts, inventor of Scrabble
- Temmie Chang, video game animator, illustrator, and developer
- Shawn Christensen, filmmaker, musician, and podcaster
- Jacky Connolly, filmmaker and video artist
- Glenn Ficarra, screenwriter and director
- Harvey Fierstein, actor and playwright
- Suzanne Fiol, founder of the performance space ISSUE Project Room
- John Flansburgh, musician
- Richard Gallo, stage actor, Performance Artist, and experimental theater stage director
- Bob Giraldi, film director
- Eric Goldberg, animator, voice actor, film director, and producer
- Liz Hannah, screenwriter and producer
- Joel Haver, comedy YouTuber and animator
- Clint Houston, jazz musician
- Matt Johnson, member of the indie electronic duo Matt and Kim
- Samantha Katz, co-producer of the Created Here television show
- Owen Kline, actor and filmmaker
- Martin Landau, actor, Space: 1999; acting coach
- Lee Sang-eun, musical artist
- Daniel Lopatin, experimental electronic music producer, composer, singer, and songwriter
- Lukita Maxwell, actress
- Jeff Morrow, actor
- Alan Mruvka, film producer
- Abraham Nathanson, creator of the game Bananagrams
- Hawley Pratt, film director and animator
- James Reams, bluegrass musician
- Rob Redding, podcaster and host of the weekday syndicated Redding News Review on SiriusXM
- Robert Redford, actor and filmmaker
- John Requa, screenwriter
- Robert Riger, television director and cinematographer
- Phoebe Robinson, comedian
- Kim Schifino, member of the indie electronic duo Matt and Kim
- Robert Siegel, radio journalist
- David Silverman, animator and director
- Yoshi Sodeoka, multimedia artist and musician
- Dante Tomaselli, film director
- Chris Tsirgiotis, animator
- Deborah Van Valkenburgh, actress, Too Close for Comfort and The Warriors
- Melora Walters, actress
- Lindsey Way, member of Mindless Self Indulgence
- Robert Wilson, stage director and playwright
- Nick Zedd, filmmaker
- Kat Zhang, rapper
- Rob Zombie, rock musician and filmmaker

== Literature and journalism ==
- Gwendolyn B. Bennett, writer and journalist
- Mark Mathew Braunstein, writer
- Bryan Collier, children's book illustrator; winner of the Coretta Scott King Award and the Ezra Jack Keats New Illustrator Award
- Sarah Louise Delany, author and educator
- Tomie dePaola, writer and illustrator who created more than 260 children's books
- Pete Hamill, journalist
- Norton Juster, author of children's books
- Arnold Lobel, author of children's books, including the Frog and Toad series
- Laura Numeroff, author and illustrator of children's books
- John Peterson, writer
- Matthew Reinhart, writer and illustrator of children's pop-up books and picture books
- Michael Rosen, children's author and poet
- Sam Savitt, author and illustrator of over 130 books
- Cyndy Szekeres, children's book author and illustrator
- Emma Paddock Telford (1851–1920), cookbook, war, travel writer
- Elliot Tiber, author and professor of writing
- Carolyn F. Ulrich, librarian who created the Ulrich's Periodicals Directory

== Politics ==
- Joseph Amenowode, member of Parliament for Hohoe South and Minister for the Volta Region of Ghana
- William D. Byron, U.S. congressman
- Elizabeth Crowley, New York City Council member
- George Lincoln Rockwell (non-degreed), founder of the American Nazi Party

== Religion ==
- William Howard Hoople, co-founder of the Association of Pentecostal Churches of America; ordained minister in the Church of the Nazarene
- Mary Elizabeth Wood, librarian and missionary

== Science, technology, and engineering ==
- Joshua Davis, winner of the Prix Ars Electronica 2001 and the Golden Nica for "Net Vision / Net Excellence”
- Lloyd Espenschied, electrical engineer who invented the coaxial cable
- William Garity, inventor and audio engineer
- Donald A. Hall, aeronautical engineer and aircraft designer who designed the Spirit of St. Louis
- Irving Langmuir, recipient of the 1932 Nobel Prize in Chemistry
- John M. Pierce, teacher and amateur astronomer

== Sports ==
- Pelle Petterson, Olympic medalist for yacht racing, World Cup winner, America's Cup participant, and yacht designer
- Sarah Schkeeper, professional American football player

== Other ==
- Stephanie Buhmann, art critic, art historian, art curator
- Leo Frank, lynching victim
- Elva A. George, dietitian and director of the Bureau of Dietitian Service of the American Red Cross during World War I
- Lynne Stewart, lawyer convicted of conspiracy and providing material support to terrorists
