= List of United States post office murals in Pennsylvania =

Following is a list of United States post office murals created in Pennsylvania between 1934 and 1943.

Location	Mural title	Image	Artist	Date	Notes	NRHPlisted
Aliquippa	Western Pennsylvania		Niles Spencer	1938	oil on canvas; now in the National Museum of American Art	
Allentown	Ten panels on the area		Gifford Beal	1939	oil on canvas; ten panels	
Altoona	Pioneers of Altoona		Lorin Thompson	1938	oil on canvas	
Altoona	Growth of the Road		Lorin Thompson	1938	oil on canvas	
Altoona			Sterling Smeltzer		Created under the PWAP program; mural is missing	
Ambler	The Family-Industry and Agriculture		Harry Sternberg	1939	oil on canvas; artist painted himself and his wife and child as The Family	
Athens	General Sullivan at Tioga Point		Allen Jones	1941	oil on canvas	
Bangor	Slate Belt People		Barbara Crawford	1941		
Beaver Falls	The Armistice Letter		Eugene Higgins	1938	oil on canvas	
Belle Vernon	Men of Coal and Steel		Michael Loew	1942	oil on canvas	
Bridgeville	Smelting		Walter Carnelli	1941	fresco Mural was destroyed	
Brownsville	Showing the People in the Early Days Transferring from Stagecoach to Boat		Richard Lahey	1936	oil on canvas	
Burgettstown	View of Burgettstown		John Fulton Folinsbee	1942	oil on canvas	
California	Monongahela River		Saul Berman	1939	oil on canvas	
Canonsburg	Beatty's Barn		Peter Blume	1937	oil on canvas	
Catasauqua	Arrival of the Stage		F. Luis Mora	1936	oil on canvas	
Columbia	Columbia Bridge		Bruce Mitchell	1938	oil on canvas	
Doylestown	William Markham Purchases Bucks County Territory		Charles Child	1937	oil on canvas	
Elizabethtown	Squaw's Rest		Lee Gatch	1942	oil on canvas	
Farrell	Myths of Vulcan and Juno		Virginia Hargraves Wood (Riggs)	1939	Painted over in 1966	
Freeland	Freeland		John Fulton Folinsbee	1938	oil on canvas; "This mural depicts a view of Freeland from Butler Terrace. Familiar buildings of the town may be seen at the left. In the central section are the mine and large breaker. In the right foreground is the Drifton State Bank, a landmark of the vicinity." — John Folinsbee	
Honesdale	Canal Boat		Walter Gardner	1937	oil on canvas	
Honesdale	Clearing the Wilderness		Walter Gardner	1937	oil on canvas	
Honesdale	Coal		Walter Gardner	1937	oil on canvas	
Honesdale	Gravity Railroad		Walter Gardner	1937	oil on canvas	
Honesdale	Visit by Washington Irving		Walter Gardner	1937	oil on canvas	
Jeannette	The Battle of Bushy Run		T. Frank Olson, designer (d. 1935)	1938	oil on canvas	
Jeannette	The Battle of Bushy Run		Robert Lepper	1938	oil on canvas	
Jeannette	The Battle of Bushy Run		Alexander J. Kostellow	1938	oil on canvas	
Jeannette	Glass Industry		T. Frank Olson, designer (d. 1935)	1938	oil on canvas	
Jeannette	Glass Industry		Robert Lepper	1938	oil on canvas	
Jeannette	Glass Industry		Alexander J. Kostellow	1938	oil on canvas	
Jenkintown	General Washington's Troops on the Old York Road		Hershel Levit	1942	tempera Stored in Jenkintown H.S.	
Kutztown	Rural Route Number One		Judson Smith	1937	oil on canvas	
Manheim	The First Orchestra in America		Theresa Bernstein	1938	oil on canvas	
Masontown	General LaFayette is Welcomed at Friendship Hill by Mr. and Mrs. Albert Gallatin on May 27, 1925		Harry Leith-Riss	1941		
Mercer	Clearing the Land		Lorin Thompson		oil on canvas Winner of the 48-State Mural Competition	
Morrisville	Canal Era		Yngve Soderberg	1939		
Mount Union	The Union of the Mountains		Paul Rohland	1937	oil on canvas	
Muncy	Rachel Silverthorne's Ride		John W. Beauchamp	1938	oil on canvas	
Nazerath	Cement Industry		Ryah Ludins	1938	oil on canvas	
Norristown	Local Industry		Paul Mays	1936	oil on canvas	
Norristown	U.S. Mail		Paul Mays	1936	oil on canvas	
Custom House and Appraisers Stores, Philadelphia	Customs and Court Activities and Various Court Activities		George Harding	1938	Thirty-one panels	
Kingsessing Branch, Philadelphia	Philadelphia Waterways with Ben Franklin Bridge		Moses Soyer	1939	oil on canvas	
Kingsessing Branch, Philadelphia	Philadelphia Waterways with Ben Franklin Bridge		Raphael Soyer	1939	oil on canvas	
Kingsessing Branch, Philadelphia	View of Downtown Philadelphia Skyline		Moses Soyer	1939	oil on canvas	
Kingsessing Branch, Philadelphia	View of Downtown Philadelphia Skyline		Raphael Soyer	1939	oil on canvas	
North Philadelphia Branch, Philadelphia	Mail Delivery		George Harding	1939	tempera	
North Philadelphia Branch, Philadelphia	City		George Harding	1939	tempera	
North Philadelphia Branch, Philadelphia	Country		George Harding	1939	tempera	
North Philadelphia Branch, Philadelphia	Northern Coast		George Harding	1939	tempera	
North Philadelphia Branch, Philadelphia	Office		George Harding	1939	tempera	
North Philadelphia Branch, Philadelphia	Home		George Harding	1939	tempera	
North Philadelphia Branch, Philadelphia	Tropics		George Harding	1939	tempera	
North Philadelphia Branch, Philadelphia	History of Mail Transportation by Water		George Harding	1939	tempera	
Philadelphia; Southwark Branch, Philadelphia	Iron Plantation near Southwark-1800		Robert Larter	1938	oil on canvas	
Philadelphia; Southwark Branch, Philadelphia	Shopyards at Southwark-1800		Robert Larter	1938	oil on canvas	
Spring Garden Branch, Philadelphia	Streets of Philadelphia		Walter Gardner	1938	oil on canvas	
Post Office and Court House, Pittsburgh	Steel Industry		Howard Cook	1936	fresco	
Post Office and Court House, Pittsburgh	Modern Justice		Kindred McLeary	1937	Mural was painted over	
Post Office and Court House, Pittsburgh	Pittsburgh Panorama		Stuyvesant Van Veen	1937	oil on canvas	
Squirrel Hill Post Office, Pittsburgh	History of Squirrel Hill		Alan Thompson	1942	oil on canvas	
Plymouth	Meal Time with the Early Coal Miners		Jared French	1938	oil on canvas	
Quakertown	Quaker Settlers		Bertram Goodman	1938	oil on canvas	
Renovo	Locomotive Repair Operation		Harold Lehman	1943	oil on canvas	
Roaring Spring	Mountain Landscape		Elizabeth Shannon Phillips	1942	oil on canvas	
Scottdale	Local Life and Industries		Herry Scheuch	1937	oil on canvas Three panels	
West Scranton Branch, Scranton	Nature's Storehouse		Herman Maril	1941	oil on canvas	
Sellersville	Carrying the Mail		Harry Sternberg	1937	tempera	
Selinsgrove	Susquehanna Trail		George Rickey	1939	tempera	
Somerset	Somerset-Farm Scene		Alexander Kostellow	1941	oil on canvas	
Tunkhannock	Defenders of the Wyoming Country-1778		Ethel Ashton	1941	oil on canvas	
Vandergrift	Railroad Postal Service		Fred Hogg	1939	oil on canvas	
Wayne	Anthony Wayne		Alfred Crimi	1941	oil on canvas	
Wilkes Barre	Anthracite Coal		George Harding	1941	tempera	
