= Martin Beck (disambiguation) =

Martin Beck is a fictional police detective, created by Maj Sjöwall and Per Wahlöö.

Martin Beck may also refer to:

== People ==
- Martin Beck (ice hockey) (born 1933), German ice hockey player
- Martin Beck (vaudeville) (1867–1940), American vaudeville mogul
- Louise Heims Beck (1889–1978), or Mrs. Martin Beck, American vaudeville performer, theatre manager, co-founder of the American Theatre Wing, and wife of the vaudeville mogul
- Martin Beck (painter) (born 1962), contemporary American artist
- Martin L. Beck, American architect, artist, and professor of architecture
- Martin Beck (artist) (born 1963), American artist, exhibition designer and professor of art and design methodology

== Other ==
- Martin Beck Theatre, a Broadway theatre in New York City
