= Alexander Kostellow =

Iranian-born American industrial designer (1897-1954)

- الکساندر کوستلو
- Born: Alexander Jusserand Kostellow c. 1897; Isfahan, Qajar Iran (now Iran)
- Died: September 1, 1954 (aged 56-57)
- Education: University of Berlin, Art Students League of New York, New York School of Fine and Applied Arts, National Academy of Design
- Occupations: Industrial designer, teacher, academic administrator, muralist, painter, advertising
- Employer(s): Carnegie Mellon University, Pratt Institute
- Spouse: Rowena Reed Kostellow (m. 1921–1954; his death)
- Children: 1

Alexander Jusserand Kostellow (Persian: الکساندر کوستلو; c. 1897 – September 1, 1954) was an Iranian-born American industrial designer and educator. He is best known for his work developing the industrial design academic programs of the Carnegie Institute of Technology and Pratt Institute. Kostellow also worked as a WPA-era muralist, painter, and in advertising.

== Early life and career ==
Alexander Jusserand Kostellow was born around 1897, in Isfahan, Qajar Iran (now Iran). He left Persia in the early 1900s, to study art in Paris and Germany.

He graduated from the University of Berlin with degrees in philosophy and psychology. When World War II broke out, Kostellow refused to join the German Nazi army, and fled the country through Holland. He arrived in the United States in 1916, first landing in Boston, where he evaded immigration officials, before moving to New York City. Kostellow worked in construction upon arriving in New York, before taking a job as an inspector and chemist at a construction company in New Castle, Delaware. Although he attempted to join the U.S. Army, recruiters deemed his construction work too important for the war effort; in his spare time, he designed war posters. His colleagues noted his artistic talents and encouraged him to study art. Kostellow returned to New York, working for an advertising agency while he studied at the Art Students League of New York, the New York School of Fine and Applied Arts (now Parsons School of Design), and the National Academy of Design.

In the early 1920s, Kostellow studied at the Kansas City Art Institute, where he met Rowena Reed. They married on September 26, 1921.

== Painting and mural career ==
In 1922, Kostellow taught briefly at the Kansas City Art Institute, before the couple returned to New York City, where he continued to study, teach, and create art. He became a noted painter and muralist, and in 1929 moved to Pittsburgh to teach painting at the Carnegie Technical Institute. While teaching at Carnegie, he continued to paint, exhibiting his work in the Museum of Modern Art and the 1934 Whitney Biennial. In 1933, his work was awarded a prize from the Associated Artists of Pittsburgh.

He painted United States post office murals through the Treasury Section of Fine Arts (TSFA), including The Battle of Bushy Run (1938) with T. Frank Olson (1890–1935) and Robert Lepper, and Glass Industry (1938), both are oil on canvas in Jeannette, Pennsylvania; and the Somerset-Farm Scene (1941), oil on canvas in Somerset, Pennsylvania.

== Industrial design career ==
Although Kostellow had been hired as a painting instructor at Carnegie, he had been heavily influenced by his time in construction and engineering, as well as Peter Behrens, whom he had studied under in Europe. These influences led him to focus his energies on the emerging academic field of industrial design. Various institutions had begun developing curricula for engineers and designers, with pioneers such as Donald Dohner, Kem Weber, and Viktor Schreckengost teaching courses at Pratt Institute, the Chicago Art Institute, the University of Cincinnati, and the Art Center School. Dohner, a graphic artist and Carnegie administrator, enlisted Kostellow and together they designed and implemented the first degree-granting program in industrial design in the United States in 1934.

In 1938, both Kostellow and Reed followed Dohner to Pratt Institute, where he had been invited to organize a similar industrial design program. The trio developed a program that would be noted internationally for its influence and modernity; Arthur Pulos described their contributions as "Alexander Kostellow representing the philosophical, Rowena Reed Kostellow the aesthetic, and Dohner the practical–they laid the triangular foundation for Pratt's program in industrial design." The department, formally established in 1934, attracted designers such as Robert Kolli, Ivan Rigby, and Eva Zeisel. Kostellow also played an instrumental role in developing the Foundation Year curriculum at Pratt, which introduced first-year students to basic elements and principles of visual design. In 1939, he helped organize the First American Congress for Aesthetics alongside Felix Gatz and Max Schoen, where the American Society for Aesthetics was founded.

Along with John Vassos, Kostellow worked to formalize the industrial design program at Pratt and beyond in the early 1940s; he served on the education committee of the American Designers' Institute, which produced a template for four-year industrial design degrees in 1944. Upon Dohner's departure from Pratt in 1944, Kostellow became a full professor as well as the head of the Industrial Design Program. He taught courses in auto design, which were influenced by shape and color abstraction theory and the modernist Bauhaus movement, but ultimately prepared students for practical design careers.

In 1952, Kostellow established the Experimental Design Laboratory at Pratt, creating opportunities for students to work with major companies and corporations on various projects, including Monsanto Chemicals, Reynolds Metals, Sears and Roebuck, and Shell Oil. The lab helped to establish Pratt as a leading design school, as students were prepared for practical production work.

== Death ==
In the summer of 1954, Kostellow and Reed traveled to Detroit to work on a kitchen design project with General Motors, to be exhibited at the annual Motorama. While there, Kostellow suffered a heart attack and died on September 1, 1954. Following the death of her husband, Reed took over the position of chair of Pratt's Industrial Design department, where she would remain until 1966.
