= Heidi Becker =

Heidi Becker may refer to:

- Heidi Becker (b. 1940) Playboy Playmate of the Month, June 1961
- Heidi Becker-Ramlow (1954–1987), diver for East Germany in the 1972 and 1976 Olympics
- Heidi N. Becker, American planetary scientist and expert on Jupiter
