= Charter High School of the Arts =

Public school in Van Nuys, California, U.S.

Charter High School of the Arts Multimedia & Performing

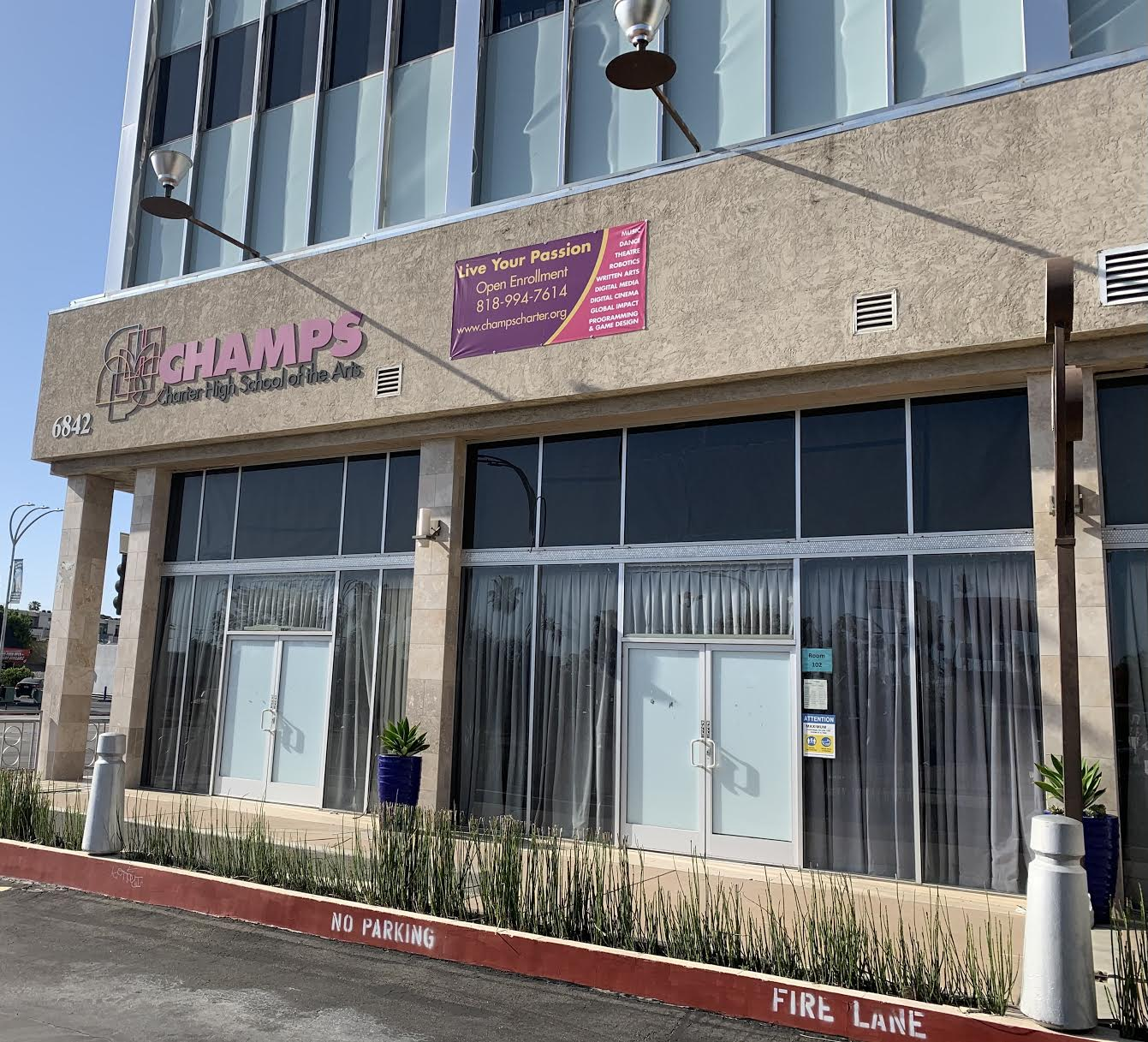

Location
- 6842 Van Nuys Boulevard; Van Nuys, California 91405; United States; 34°11′42″N 118°26′54″W

Information
- Type: Public, charter
- Established: 2005
- School district: Los Angeles Unified School District
- Principal: Jay San Agustin
- Grades: 9–12
- Enrollment: 876
- Nickname: Panthers
- Accreditation: Western Association of Schools and Colleges
- Newspaper: The Paw Print
- Website: School website

Charter High of the Arts Multimedia and Performing (or CHAMPS) is a public charter high school in Van Nuys, Los Angeles, California.

The school was founded in 2005 by Norman Isaacs, a former principal of Robert A. Millikan Middle School Performing Arts Magnet in Sherman Oaks. Isaacs sought to create a high school where students could study digital media, visual, and performing arts.

CHAMPS and the Los Angeles County High School for the Arts are the only public high schools that admit students from anywhere in Los Angeles County. Students who want to enroll in a specific academy (dance, music, drama, media arts, or robotics) must audition to get in. Enrolled students may change academies with the approval of the department chairs and counselors.
