= Heidi N. Becker =

American planetary scientist

Heidi N. Becker is an American planetary scientist who studies Jupiter as radiation monitoring investigation lead for NASA's Juno space mission. She works at NASA's Jet Propulsion Laboratory.

Becker came to science late; she was a dance and theater student at the Los Angeles County High School for the Arts and the New York University Tisch School of the Arts, and graduated from NYU with a Bachelor of Fine Arts in 1990. After working in theater in New York, she became interested in science through hospital volunteer work, and returned to college in her mid-20s, initially in New York and then transferring to California State Polytechnic University, Pomona. She joined the Jet Propulsion Lab while still working towards a second bachelor's degree in physics at Cal Poly Pomona. She completed her degree in 2001, and became a full-time researcher at JPL.

Becker's research on Jupiter has involved taking close-up images of Jupiter's moon Ganymede, discovering lightning unexpectedly high in Jupiter's atmosphere, finding a possible explanation for the lightning through antifreeze-like interactions between water and ammonia, and studying ammonia-water hailstorms as a mechanism for ammonia depletion from the upper atmosphere.

In 2024, the Juno space mission, working in collaboration with scientists from the Technical University of Denmark, produced the first complete radiation map of Jupiter.

In 2025, Becker's research on Jupiter continued, investigating the volcanic moon, Io, through channelized thermal emission. Recent discoveries in that investigation include the highest resolution images of Io's surface to date, which depict a river of lava and possible sulfur dioxide gas jets.
