= A. G. Visser =

Afrikaans poet

Andries Gerhardus Visser
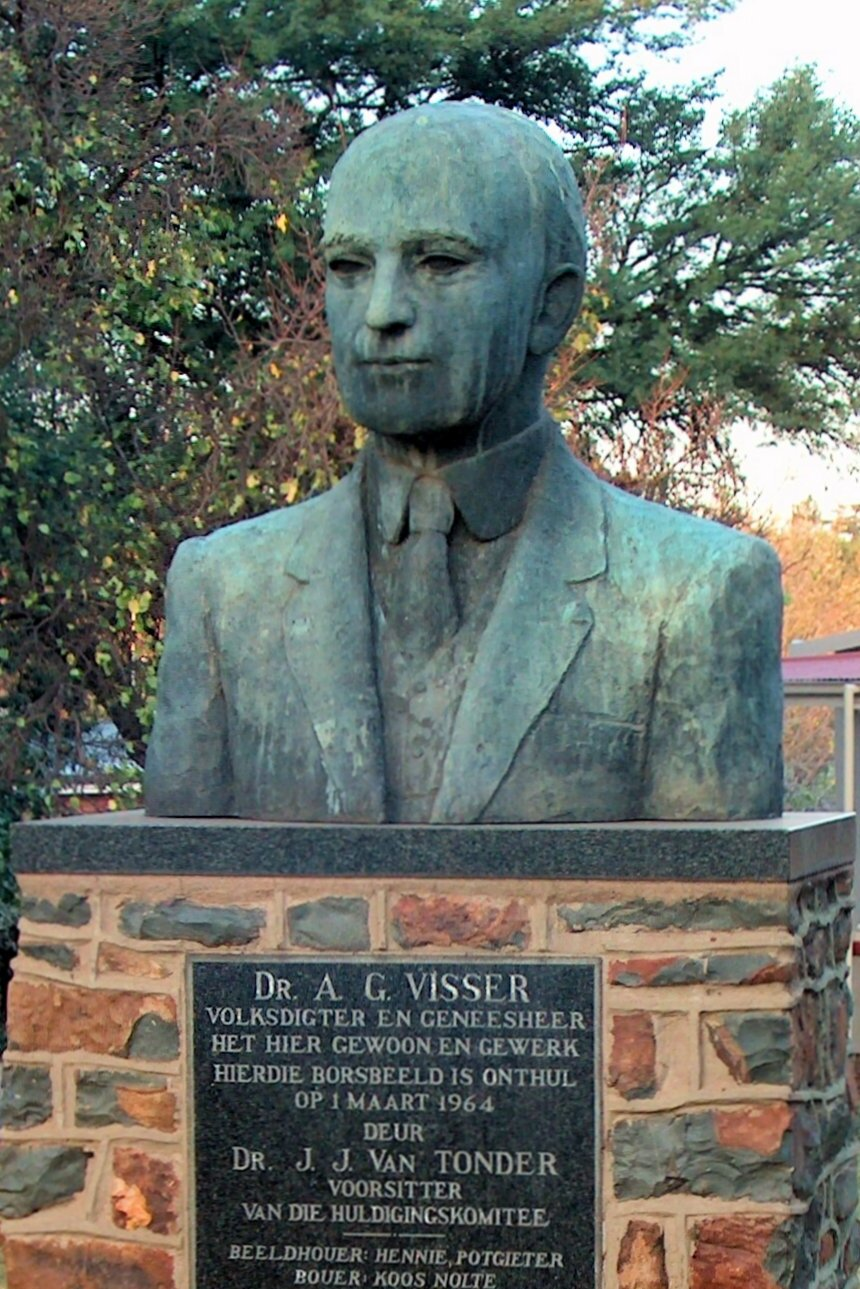
- Born: 1 March 1879; Fraserburg district, Cape Colony
- Died: 10 June 1929 (aged 50)
- Occupations: Physician, poet
- Relatives: Jacob van Schalkwyk, great-grandson

Andries Gerhardus Visser (1 March 1878 – 10 June 1929) was a well-known early Afrikaans poet. He was popularly known as the "Singer of the Suikerbosrand".

== Biography ==
Visser was born on the farm Zaaifontein in the Fraserburg district of Cape Colony. An intense drought drove his parents from their farm in Carnarvon and he was born in a tent in the farmyard, under the shadow of a pear tree. He attended school in Dal Josafat at the same time as two other notable writers, Totius and D. F. Malherbe.

He received teacher's training at Normal College in Cape Town, then studied medicine in Edinburgh, Scotland, from 1901 to 1906. He worked as a medical doctor in Carnarvon (1906–1909), Steytlerville (1909–1916) and Heidelberg (1916–1929). He became close friends with the poet Eugene Marais while in Heidelberg. He was a South African Freemason. He married twice; in 1913 with Lettie Conradie, who died in 1920, and again in 1927 with Marie de Villiers. He died on 10 June 1929.

== Literary career ==
Visser was already published at eighteen in Ons Kleintji. His work is not regarded as part of the Eerste Taalbeweging, rather as the part of the poetry from the period until 1930.

He twice won the prestigious Hertzog Prize for literature, for both his first and second anthologies.

His verse is notably simple and musical, making use of traditional verse forms such as the rondeel, intertextual references and techniques such as the switching of idioms, epigrams and spellings.

== Bibliography ==
- Gedigte. (J. L. Van Schaik, 1925).
- Rose van herinnering en ander gedigte. (J. L. van Schaik, 1927).
- Die purper iris, en ander nagelate gedigte. (Nasionale Pers, 1930).
- Uit ons prille jeug. (Nasionale Pers, 1948).
- Bloemlesing uit die gedigte. (Van Schaik, 1955).
- Kinderkeur. (Van Schaik, 1967).
- Roos en lanset: ’n keuse uit A. G. Visser. (Van Schaik, 1978).
- Versamelde gedigte. (Tafelberg, 1981).

== Bibliography about him ==
- A. G Visser, digter en sanger. (Nienaber, P. J. Uitgewer Afrikaanse persboekhandel, 1950).
- Sanger van die suikerbosrand; die lewensverhaal van A. G. Visser. (Langenhoven, P. H. Uitgewer Voortrekkerpers,1950).
- A. G. Visser in woord en beeld. (Venter, E. A. 1978. Selfgepubliseer, 1978).
- Geskiedenis van die Afrikaanse literatuur. I. (Kannemeyer, J. C. Uitgewer Academica,1978).
- A. G. Visser – 'n vertolkingsdimensie. (Schutte, Paul. Uitgewer P.U. vir C.H.O., 1979).
- Perspektief en profiel, II. (Venter, Leona. A. G. Visser. In: Van Coller, H. P. (ed.). 1999. Uitgewer J. L. van Schaik, 1999).
