= Ernando Recendez =

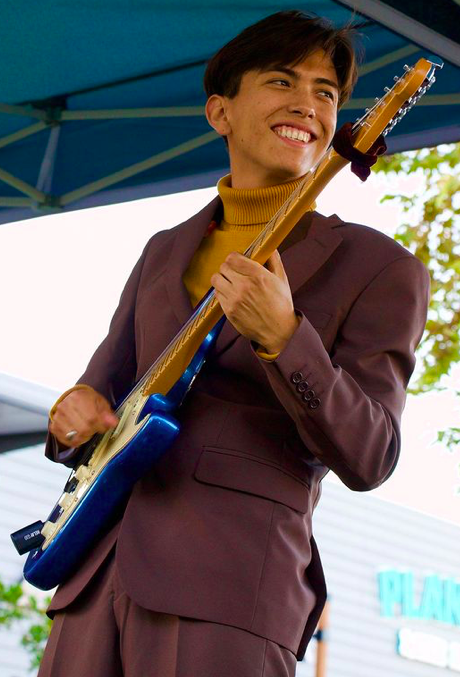

Background information
- Born: October 22, 1999 (age 25); Pico Rivera, California
- Genres: Pop, R&B, Funk
- Occupation(s): Singer-songwriter, musician
- Instrument(s): Vocal, piano, guitar, bass, drums, ukulele
- Years active: 2017–present
- Website: ernandorecendez.com

Ernando Recendez (born October 22, 1999), is an artist, singer, musician, and entertainer. Ernando has an eclectic music style ranging from Top 40, Rock, R&B, Classic Hits, and more; and has broken down age, ethnic, geographic, and cultural boundaries.

== Early life ==
Born and raised in Pico Rivera, California, Ernando Recendez grew up around music as his parents met when his dad auditioned for his mom's band. Ernando grew up listening to his parents' band perform throughout various local festivals. At the age of 7, Ernando performed She Will Be Loved by Maroon 5 at a local church carnival as it would be his first time on stage. His influences include diverse musicians such as The Beatles, Rex Orange County, and Justin Bieber. He self-taught himself instruments such as piano, recorder, guitar, saxophone, ukulele, bass, drums, all while trying to complete junior high school. Ernando auditioned for the Los Angeles County High School for the Arts (LACHSA) where he got accepted as a classical vocalist. During Ernando's 4 years of high school, he experimented with different genres of music like classical, jazz, as well as musical theatre. Ernando got accepted to the Berklee College of Music as well as the San Francisco Conservatory of Music. After moving to San Francisco, he quickly dropped out and moved back home to take care of his mom who was diagnosed with stage 3 breast cancer.

== Music career ==
In 2017, Ernando recorded and produced his first official project, the Nocturnal, which would be his first EP. Ernando gained a better grasp of live performance during his time with his former bands, HO3 and Zoopocket, all while trying to feature his original music. He then went on to release singles such as Ladybug, and No Way.

In 2020, Ernando would then start his own group that included his dad and brother called Ernando and the Nandos. He wrote and released his latest single, LAX, which features the first appearance of the Nandos in action.

In 2021, Ernando went on to write, record, and produced his first debut album, The Nandos. Currently Ernando performs every weekend at public and private events throughout Southern California.

== Discography ==
=== Albums ===
The Nandos (2021)

=== Eps ===
Nocturnal (2017)

=== Singles ===
Jen (2017)

Ladybug (2019)

no way (2019)

LAX (2020)

What's Your Name? (2021)
