= John Pai =

American sculptor

- Born: 1937 (age 88–89); Seoul, South Korea
- Education: Pratt Institute
- Known for: Sculpture
- Awards: Rowena Reed Award

John Pai (Korean: 죤배; born October 4, 1937) is an American sculptor and Pratt Institute professor emeritus. Pai works primarily with welded metal, often creating freestanding sculptures with grid-like and curved natural shapes. After completing his Bachelor in Industrial Design (1962) and Master of Fine Arts in Sculpture at Pratt (1964), Pai began teaching at his alma mater in 1965 as the youngest ever professor appointed by the school. Retiring from teaching in 2000, Pai shifted to focusing on his artistic practice full-time. He now works and lives in Fairfield, Connecticut.

Pai was born in Seoul, South Korea, and spent part of his childhood in Ilsan and Seoul (where he began his training in visual art) before moving to the US in 1949, and spending much of his adolescence in Wheeling, West Virginia. He continued his training at the Oglebay Institute, where he had his first solo show at the age of 15, and with the Famous Artists School's correspondence courses. He received a full scholarship to attend Pratt, and studied industrial design, as well as sculpture later in his MFA program. While in Pratt he expanded his scope of study to include physics, biology, and chemistry, as well as dance and music. As a professor, he encouraged his students to also pursue interdisciplinary research to inform their artistic practices. In New York, Pai became well-acquainted with the Korean diasporic art scene, regularly inviting artists and musicians over to his and his wife's house in Brooklyn.

Pai has regularly exhibited domestically and abroad, and the first monograph of his work titled John Pai: Liquid Steel, and written by critic John Yau, was published in 2023.

== Early life ==
Pai's mother was Choi Soonoak. Choi was born in Russia in 1902 after her family fled to the country following the assassination of Empress Myeongseong in 1895 by the Japanese. Choi's family ran a successful tea business and later sent Choi to Korea as a teen to continue her studies. It was there that she met Pai's father. Pai's father Pai Minsoo (배민수) was a well-known reverend and activist who was part of the Korean independence movement during the period of Japanese colonial rule. Pai Minsoo's father was also a famous commander in the resistance movement, and was executed by the Japanese military. When Pai was born, his father was imprisoned by the Japanese for his activist work.

Pai has two siblings, a brother named Pai Young, and sister Pai Youngai (Mary Pai).

While in prison, Pai's father met an American missionary who convinced him to study at the McCormick Theological Seminary in Chicago, and helped facilitate his release. As a result, Pai's father went to the US in 1938, and Pai was unable to meet his father until he was eight and his father returned in 1945 working with the U.S. Army. While Pai's father was away, in an effort to avoid continued surveillance and searches by the police, Choi moved the rest of the family to a remote farm in Ilsan. When Pai's father returned at the end of World War II, he moved the family to Seoul. Choi sent Pai at the age of 8 to study with an artist in the city after recognizing that he was interested in drawing and painting.

In December 1948, the Pai family took the USS General H. F. Hodges from Incheon to the US. They went to Wheeling, West Virginia to stay with Pai's father's college friend Arthur Pritchard, but en route they stopped in Toledo where their host, Reverend Kenneth Cutler, suggested that Pai's father give his two younger children American names. Pai's father decided on John and Mary. In Wheeling, the Pais were the only Asian residents in the city. In 1948, Pai's father went back to Korea, and in 1957, Pai's mother also returned to Korea to join her husband. Pai stayed in Wheeling for another three years staying with a friend's family, and then moved to New Jersey to live with his brother and his brother's wife who were completing doctoral programs at Rutgers.

== Education ==
Determined to continue Pai's art education once they moved to the US, Choi enrolled Pai in the Oglebay Institute Saturday Morning Art Program in 1950. Pai studied with the director of the institute, Harry C. Holbert. Holbert organized a solo exhibition of Pai's work when Pai was only 15 years old in 1952.

Despite being rejected the first time due to his age, the Pai was accepted by the Famous Artists School in Connecticut as a teen.

After trying to choose between studying art and architecture, Pai applied to Pratt and received a full four-year scholarship. He moved to New York with his sister at the age of 21 in 1958. The young Pai was able to explore New York's many museums, and attend numerous dance performances and concerts. While at Pratt, he studied with designer Rowena Reed Kostellow. As an undergraduate, he also participated in the design and production of the Hawaii Pavilion at the World's Fair in 1964 through his teacher William Katavolos. Pai graduated with a Bachelor in Industrial Design (1962) and Master of Fine Arts in Sculpture (1964) at Pratt Institute.

== Work ==
=== Teaching (1965-2000) ===
Pai began teaching at his alma mater in 1965 as the youngest professor to ever be appointed at the school, and was appointed head of the sculpture department after his professor Calvin Albert recommended him for the position. In 1971, Pai became the director of the Division of Fine Arts at Pratt. Soon after, he introduced courses on phenomenology and bionics into the curriculum. Pai also sought to expand the scope of study for students by inviting speakers like theorist Rudolf Arnheim, architect Paolo Soleri, composer Hall Overton, cellist James Kreger, and documentarian Bud Greenspan. Pai's students include artist Arlan Huang.

Pai worked at Pratt as a teacher and administrator leading the school's art and sculpture programs for almost four decades. He shifted solely to teaching in 1974, and then left Pratt in 2000 to focus on his sculptural work full-time.

=== Artistic community ===
While they lived in New York, Pai and his wife regularly hosted parties for other diasporic Korean artists, musicians, and writers. Attendees included artists Nam June Paik, Kim Whanki, and Kim Tschang-yeul, and musicians Hwang Byungki and Kun-woo Paik. Kim Whanki's widow Kim Hyang-an later helped Pai find a gallery in Korea, and organize a show of Whanki's and Pai's work at FIAC (Foire Internationale d’Art Contemporain) in Paris in 1980.

=== Influences ===
==== Artists and movements ====
Pai has cited artists like Theodore Roszak and Roman Vishniac, and scholarly writing on African art as influences. While at Pratt, Pai worked as sculptor Roszak's studio assistant. Pai reached out to Roszak after seeing his work at the "New images of Man" show at the Museum of Modern Art (MoMA).

Art historian Kim Yisoon claims that while Pai met other Korean artists living in New York, his work does not seem to have been influenced by other diasporic Korean artists in the city.

Los Angeles County Museum of Art (LACMA) curator Virginia Moon considers his early work to be influenced by Art Informel, and credits the movement for leading Pai to welding while at Pratt.

In contrast, critic John Yau, argues that Pai was never associated with either a Korean or American artistic style or movement.

==== Science ====
Yau, who curated a group show of Pai's work in 2011 at Tina Kim Gallery, has stated that Pai is influenced by other fields of study, including science (especially physics and biology), and architecture. While at Pratt, Pai befriended the entire science department, and became close friends with physicist Burt Frabricand. During the mid-60s, Pai began focusing on modules as the organizing units of his sculptures in reference to the basic components of natural life. In an interview, Pai has stated the need for him to understand both the physics and chemistry of nature, as well as ideas around symbiosis for his work. He began reading Guy Murchie's writing in the 70s when he was making works like Involution (1974) and Covolution (1976).

==== Sports, dance, and music ====
Pai studied music as a child (playing the piano, saxophone, clarinet, and cello), participated in team sports as a teen, and developed a strong interest in modern dance and ballet while in New York. Pai even tried to take a class with a former Martha Graham student. He has cited both sports and dance as related to his artistic practice since he conceives of his sculptures beginning with a dot or line moving through space, and thinks about music as time in space.

==== Asian philosophy ====
Curator Jeffrey Wechsler claims that Pai has turned away from abstract art in the US and Europe, as well as Cubism, to move towards ideas around nature in philosophical traditions like Confucianism, Daoism, and Buddhism.

=== Artistic process ===
When discussing his work, Pai places significant emphasis on process in shaping his sculptures rather than a preconceived idea of what a piece should look like. He has outlined the need to be attentive to the natural movements and structures of materials, and role of the artist as less a maker, and more of a participant in its construction. He has described welding as a process to be akin to painting: "Flame makes a droplet of molten metal. The wire makes a line. I can go from point to line to plane to mass. Steel gives structural range while heat gives plasticity." This careful consideration of the liquidity and flexibility of metal is what has allowed him to distinguish his use of metal from other sculptors like David Smith.

Pai created his first sculpture in 1963, but did not consider himself a sculptor until he received his first commission for an outdoor piece. He made Passage (1997) for Kingsborough Community College.

== Critical reception ==
Vivien Raynor, reviewing a group show of Korean art in 1986, draws a connection between Pai and early Giacometti.

John Yau praises Pai's sculptures as continually changing despite their solidity and simplicity.

Mark Jenkins considers Pai's "minimalist" sculptures to fall under the category of mainstream international contemporary art even though he is not as well known as other contemporaneous sculptors.

Critic Will Heinrich describes Pai's work in "The Unseen Professors" as "border[ing] between math and craft."

== Selected exhibitions ==
=== Solo exhibitions ===
==== 2013 ====
- "John Pai: In Memory's Lair," Gallery Hyundai, Seoul

==== 2006 ====
- "Convergence and Divergence: A Decade in Line, 1996-2006," Gallery Hyundai, Seoul

==== 2003 ====
- "John Pai: Metaphors of Space," Rodin Gallery (Samsung Plateau Art Space), Seoul

==== 1997 ====
- Sigma Gallery, New York

==== 1993 ====
- "John Pai: Sculpture, 1983-1993," Gallery Hyundai, Seoul

==== 1988 ====
- Souyunyi Gallery, New York

==== 1982 ====
- Won Gallery, Seoul
- Whanki Foundation, New York

==== 1964 ====
- Pratt Institute, New York

=== Group exhibitions ===
==== 2022 ====
- "The Space Between: The Modern in Korean Art," Los Angeles County Museum of Art, Los Angeles

==== 2011 ====
- "The Unseen Professors: Leo Amino, Minoru Niizuma, John Pai," Tina Kim Gallery, New York

==== 2010 ====
- "Floating Hours: Moon Is the Oldest Clock," National Museum of Modern and Contemporary Art, Deoksugung, Seoul

==== 2009 ====
- "The Great Hands," Gallery Hyundai, Seoul

==== 2007 ====
- "Poetry in Motion," Gallery Hyundai, Seoul

==== 2003 ====
- "Dreams and Reality: Korean American Contemporary Art," Smithsonian, Washington D.C.

==== 2001 ====
- "Whanki Museum Retrospective 1975-2001," Whanki Museum, Seoul

==== 1981 ====
- "Korean Drawing Now," Brooklyn Museum, Brooklyn

==== 1970 ====
- "Asian Traditions/Modern Expressions: Asian American Artists and Abstraction, 1945-1970," Jane Voorhees Zimmerli Art Museum, New Brunswick

==== 1967 ====
- "Made with Paper," Museum of Contemporary Crafts, New York

== Awards ==
- Rowena Reed Award, 2021

== Collections ==
Pai's worked has been collected by the following institutions:

- The Alternative Museum, New York
- Busan Museum of Art, Busan
- Leeum, Samsung Museum of Art, Seoul
- National Museum of Modern and Contemporary Art, Seoul
- Pratt Institute, New york
- Seoul Institute of the Arts, Ansan
- Seoul Museum of Art, Seoul
- Shinsegae Gallery, Seoul
- Walker Hill Art Museum, Seoul
- Whanki Museum, Seoul
- Wooyang Museum of Contemporary Art, Gyeongju

== Personal life ==
Pai's wife is Eunsook Pai (née Lee). The couple married in the mid-60s and lived in Clinton Hill. They have two children, Liana Pai and Ian Pai. They now live in Connecticut.
