= Gina Lucia =

Gina Lucia is an American art director, artist, designer, and educator. She has been published in the U.S., Brazil and Spain and has exhibited her work in galleries in New York City, Los Angeles, CA and in Jersey City, New Jersey.

== Biography ==
Lucia earned a Bachelor of Arts degree in Studio Arts from Montclair State University and a graduate degree in Communication Design from Pratt Institute. She is a freelance art director, and has taught Graphic Design I and II at Montclair State University, and at the NYU School of Continuing and Professional Studies. She has been published in the U.S., Brazil and Barcelona, Spain and has exhibited her work in such galleries as the PPOW Gallery in New York City, Broadway Gallery in New York City, A.I.R Gallery and Interstate Gallery in Brooklyn, Solas Gallery in New York City, Las Laguna Art Gallery in Laguna Beach, California and The Mary Benson Gallery in Jersey City, New Jersey. Her artworks have been published by Rockport Publishers in a book entitled "1,000 Music Graphics." Lucia is a former member of the artist collective LaOla.

Lucia has received numerous awards and accolades from Graphic Design USA, The Art Director's Club of New Jersey and NJIABC. She has been a contributing artist to the “Global Inheritance Recycling Project” at the Coachella Valley Music and Arts Festival in Indio, CA and exhibited her environmentally conscious art in the Trashed group art exhibit at the POVevolving Gallery in Los Angeles.

Lucia wrote, illustrated and self published 2 books: a children’s book entitled, “Serenity Meow" and a typography book entitled, "The Fundamentals of Typography."

== Artistic style ==
Lucia's mixed media collage work fuses commercial and fine art techniques. Hand drawn sketches are combined with found objects, photography, hand-rendered typography and presented in a thought-provoking photomontage. Inspired by music, Surrealism and the Freudian concept of free association, personal experiences and heartbreak, everyday encounters with objects people and places, the current social and political climate, her collages are spontaneous juxtapositions of unlikely things. She incorporates elements of pop culture; viscera; nature; animals; insects; and other eclectic ephemera into her work. The harmonious commingling of both digital technology and fine art techniques has allowed her to redefine and refine her art.

== Publications ==
- NY Arts Magazine, New York, NY 2011

https://issuu.com/abrahamlubelski/docs/aahab_april_2011_spring

- p. 146, Basic Identity, Index Book 2010, Barcelona, Spain
- p. 142 Graphic Design USA American Graphic Design Award and Publication in 2010 Design Annual, 2010
- p. 0448, 0449 pp. 124, Rockport Publishers/1,000 Music Graphics, 2008
- p. 12, The Black Book/RAW, 2008
- www.zupi.com.br, Zupi, Zupi Revista, Brazil 2006

https://pixelshow.co/revista-de-arte-e-criatividade-zupi

- pp. 80 & 98, Graphic Design USA/2005 Inhouse Design Awards, 2005
- 2015 GD USA Design Award – Eye Level Cover Designs
- 2013 GD USA Design Award – Lucero Branding
- 2013 Published in GD USA for Lucero Branding
- 2012 Published in GD USA for OP Campaign Design
- 2012 Published in GD USA for BONGO Website Design
- 2012 GD USA 2x’s Award – BONGO and OP
- 2012 GD USA Web Design Award OP Website
- 2010 GD USA Design Award – Derek Loves Shopping
- 2010 Published in GD USA for Derek Loves Shopping
- 2010 Published Index Book, “Basic Identity” Barcelona, Spain – Bangz
- 2008 Published 2x’s in 1,000 Music Graphics Rockport Publishers
- 2008 GD USA Design Award – 53 Kustom
- 2008 Published in Black Book RAW
- 2008 Zupi.com.br – Published, Sao Paulo, Brazil
- 2005 Art Director’s Club of NJ – Certificate of Excellence Award
- 2005 GD USA Inhouse Design Award – News@Cendant
- 2005 Published 2x’s in GD USA Design Annual – News@Cendant
- 2004 The NJIABC – IRIS Award of Merit Recipient
