= Los Angeles County High School for the Arts =

Location
- 5151 State University Drive; Los Angeles, California 90032; United States; 34.064212°N 118.169535°W

Information
- Type: Public secondary
- Established: 1985
- Founder: Caroline Leonetti Ahmanson
- School district: Los Angeles County Office of Education
- Principal: Tina Vartanian
- Teaching staff: 80.72 (on an FTE basis)
- Grades: 9–12
- Enrollment: 542 (2018–19)
- Student to teacher ratio: 6.71
- Website: www.lachsa.net

Los Angeles County High School for the Arts (LACHSA, /ˈlɒksə/) is a visual and performing arts high school located on the campus of California State University, Los Angeles in Los Angeles, California, United States.

It is a public school, operated by the Los Angeles County Office of Education.

== History ==
The school was founded by philanthropist Caroline Leonetti Ahmanson in 1985.

== Overview ==
LACHSA is a public and tuition-free school, offering both college preparatory courses and conservatory style training. Though it shares facilities with Cal State LA, the two schools' activities are usually separate. It is operated by the Los Angeles County Office of Education.

The school specializes in preparing students for careers in the arts. It is one of two arts high schools in Los Angeles that allows students from any district within Los Angeles County to attend, the other being Charter High School of the Arts in Van Nuys. Acceptance into the school is based on an audition process for the approximately 130 spots available for incoming students, about 90% of whom are freshmen.

The school has five departments, Dance, Music (Vocals and Instrumental), Theatre, Visual Arts, and Cinematic Arts (Film). Specializations in Musical Theatre, Opera, Technical Theatre, and Commercial Music are also offered.

In 2012, Academy Award nominee Scott Hamilton Kennedy made an award-winning documentary about LACHSA called Fame High.

In late March 2013, LACHSA officially moved many of its classes to a more permanent building on the edge of Cal State LA's campus. It has three stories, the third floor being a black box theater, where most performances from the school take place.

== Demographics ==
In 2018–19 LACHSA had 542 students enrolled in grades nine through twelve, with a student-teacher ratio of 6.7:1.

Demographics of student body
Ethnic Breakdown	2021	2020	2019
Hispanic	25%	26%	25%
Black	10%	9%	9.6%
Asian	13%	13%	13%
Native Hawaiian or other Pacific Islander	0.2%	0%	0.2%
Native American	0.4%	0.2%	N/A
White	35%	33%	35%
Multiracial	17%	19%	17.8%
Female	62%	61%	62%
Male	38%	39%	38%

== Academic recognition ==
- LACHSA received a GreatSchools Rating of 9 out of 10.
- LACHSA was listed as the #1 arts high school in the nation in 2023

=== U.S. News 2021 Rankings ===
- 102 in Los Angeles metropolitan area High Schools
- 227 in California High Schools
- 1,498 in National Rankings

=== U.S. News 2020 Rankings ===
- 3 in Los Angeles County Office of Education High Schools
- 128 in Los Angeles metropolitan area High Schools
- 279 in California High Schools
- 2,030 in National Rankings

=== U.S. News 2019 Rankings ===
- 165 in Los Angeles metropolitan area High Schools
- 356 in California High Schools
- 2,315 in National Rankings

== Notable alumni ==
- Ai, singer
- Anthony Anderson, television actor
- Jon B., singer/songwriter
- Ariela Barer, actress and filmmaker
- Libe Barer, actress
- Corbin Bleu, actor
- Angel Blue, opera singer
- Phoebe Bridgers, singer/songwriter
- Daniel Brummel, bassist
- Monica Calhoun, actress
- Sadie Calvano, television actress
- Ako Castuera, sculptor, storyboard artist
- Gerald Clayton, jazz pianist and composer
- Zoey Deutch, actress
- Clea DuVall, actress
- Jenna Elfman, actor
- Maya Erskine, actor and writer
- Michael Fitzpatrick, singer and songwriter
- Dillon Francis, music producer
- Angelica Garcia, singer/songwriter
- Eva Gardner, bassist, singer/ songwriter
- Drew Garrett, actor
- Spencer Grammer, television actress
- Josh Groban, singer/songwriter, actor on Broadway
- Alana Haim, singer
- Danielle Haim, singer
- Este Haim, singer
- Beth Hart, singer
- The Hound, singer
- Taran Killam, television actor
- Thomas Kotcheff, composer
- Josefina Lopez, playwright
- Victor Ma, Chinese-American singer
- Rhiannon McGavin, poet
- Belissa Escobedo, actress
- Rashaan Nall, actor
- Ryan Scott Oliver, musical theatre composer and lyricist
- Elizabeth Olsen, actor
- Gretchen Parlato, jazz singer and composer
- Christina Quarles, painter
- Ernando Recendez, singer/songwriter
- Kara Royster, television actress
- Sasami, singer
- Marla Sokoloff, actress and musician
- Tammy Townsend, actress and singer
- Robert Vargas, artist
- McKenzie Westmore, television actress
- Kehinde Wiley, painter
- Finn Wittrock, television actor
- Eloise Wong, bassist of The Linda Lindas
- Charm La'Donna, Choreographer and Creative Director
- Jae Stephens, singer/songwriter
