= Lorin Thompson =

American painter

Lorin Thompson, Lorin Hartwell Jr Thompson, (1911–1997), was a male muralist, artist, and creator and illustrator of the character Ranger Rick for the National Wildlife Federation's children's magazine, Ranger Rick.

== Muralist ==
The United States post office in Altoona, Pennsylvania contains two oil on canvas Treasury Relief Art Project commissioned murals by Pittsburgh artist Lorin Thompson Jr. painted in 1938 titled Pioneers of Altoona and Growth of the Road. The first mural "Pioneers of Altoona", depicts the early settlers establishing an early railroad track. The second mural depicts the growth of a community amongst the now cleared wilderness of Altoona. The mural contains various images of daily life such as people shopping and children attending school. Another commissioned piece was the oil on canvas mural, Clearing the Land for the post office in Mercer, Pennsylvania. This mural depicts farmhands working to clear trees from a new farm field. The Murals in Altoona reference the historic ties the town has with the railroad. while the mural in Mercer references the many farms that surround Mercer.

Another mural was for the Pascagoula, Mississippi post office, titled Legend of the Singing River and completed in 1939. Thompson drew inspiration from a local folktale about a tribe of Native Americans who chose to enter the river and eventually drown as an alternative to facing the wrath of an enemy tribe. The mural was restored in the 1960s as the building became the Pascagoula Public Library. The building was damaged by Hurricane Katrina in 2005 and the mural was placed in storage. In 2010, it was re-installed at the new Pascagoula post office. The first Murals Thompson painted were the two in the Altoona post office completed in 1938. Following this project was the completion of the Legend of Singing River in 1939, with his last mural "Clearing the land" in Mercer being completed in 1940. Thompson's murals center around subjects of daily life, local history, agriculture, industry, and folklore. these are themes common within murals produced the artists commissioned to paint them. These were suggested topics in the guidelines issued by the Treasury Section of Fine Art's who commissioned Thompson to paint these murals. The idea of choosing one of these suggested topics was to make the art resonate with the local population who would view it every time they entered the building which housed the mural.

== Exhibits ==
His drawings, lithographs, etchings and paintings have been exhibited at

- Chicago Art Institute, (Chicago, IL)
- Corcoran Gallery of Art, (Washington, DC)
- National Gallery, (Washington, DC)
- Whitney Museum, (New York City),
- Carnegie Museum, (Pittsburgh, PA)

== Ranger Rick ==
He created and illustrated Ranger Rick for the National Wildlife Federation's children's magazine Ranger Rick.
