= Sam Savitt =

American painter (1917–2000)

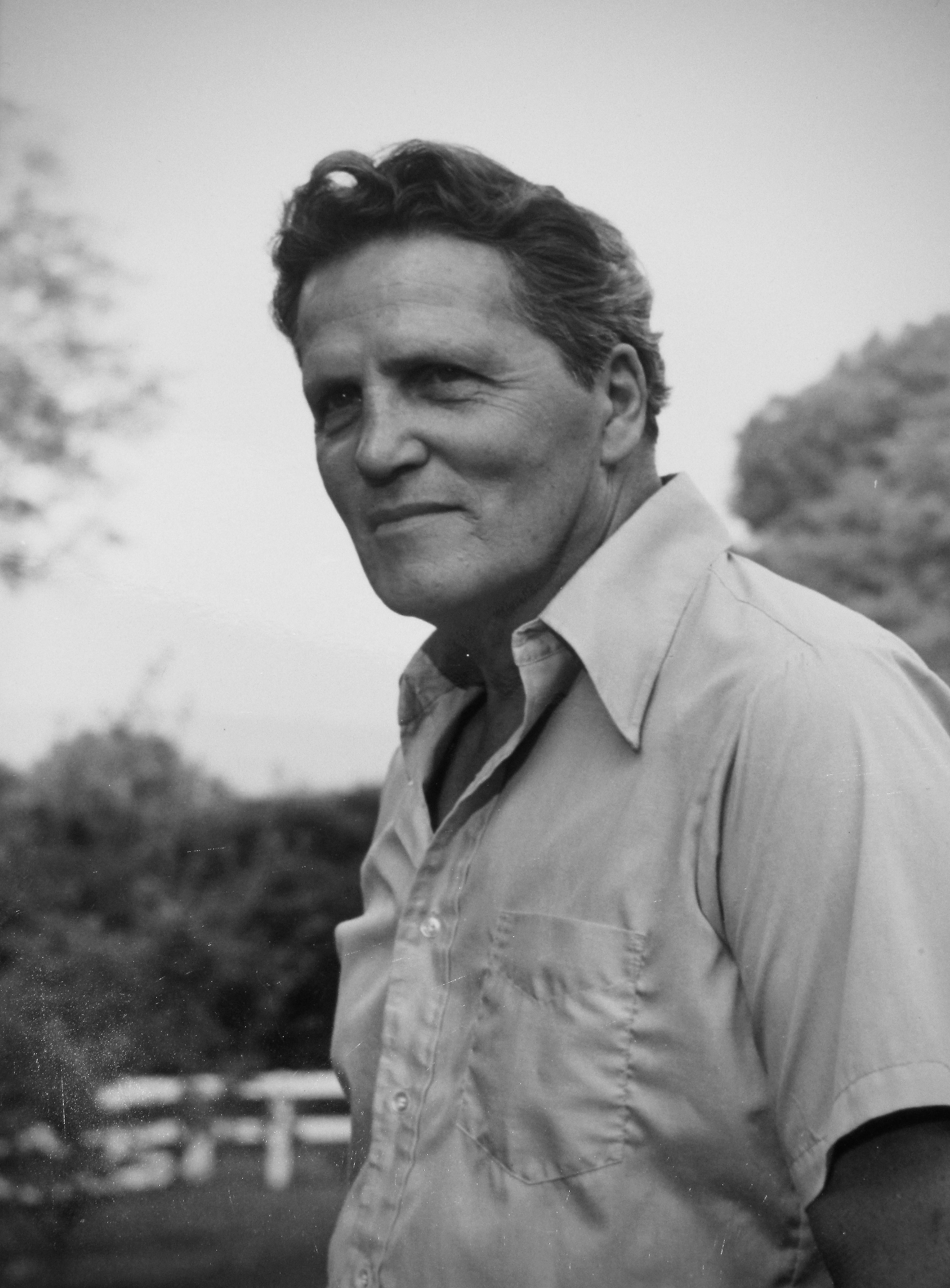
- Born: March 22, 1917; Wilkes-Barre, Pennsylvania, U.S.
- Died: December 25, 2000 (aged 83); North Salem, New York, U.S.
- Education: Pratt Institute
- Occupations: Artist and author
- Spouse: Bette (m. 1946)
- Children: Vicki, Roger
- Website: www.samsavittart.com/about

Sam Savitt (March 22, 1917 – December 25, 2000) was an equine artist, author, and teacher, as well as an illustrator of over 130 books, in addition to 16 that he wrote. He was designated the official illustrator of the United States Equestrian Team in 1958, and was a founding member of the American Academy of Equine Art in 1980. He created several horse charts that are considered authoritative works and have been used by the Smithsonian Institution. He was also a member of the Society of Illustrators and the Society of Animal Artists.

== Early life ==
Sam Savitt was born in Wilkes-Barre, Pennsylvania in 1917. He graduated from Pratt Institute in 1939, and was a veteran of the Second World War's Asia and Pacific theater, where he held the rank of First Lieutenant. He was further educated at the New School, in sculpting, as well as the Art Students League of New York in visual arts. Savitt was also an active equestrian, and relocated to North Salem, New York in 1956.

== Career ==
The New York Times said of his 1956 book Step-a-Bit: The Story of a Foal, that Savitt's drawings had "great charm and spontaneity". That year Savitt was named the official artist of the United States Equestrian Team. Then his book Midnight, Champion Bucking Horse won the Boys Club of America junior book award in 1958. In 1950, he illustrated the seminal book on English equestrianism, Learning to Ride, Hunt, and Show by Gordon Wright.

His paintings have been used in the posters for races like the Kentucky Derby and the National Horse Show. His work went to galleries and commercial accounts, and he painted portraits of people such as William Randolph Hearst Jr. and Raymond Firestone with their horses. It was at times considered a mark of greatness for a race horse to have been illustrated and published by Savitt. He has also created paintings of horses participating in competitive polo. In addition, his subjects included fox hunting, rodeo, steeple-chasing and show jumping. His 1981 book Draw Horses with Sam Savitt is considered to be a seminal book in equine portraiture. He also did portraits of dogs.

As a writer he wrote sixteen books and co-authored three. In addition, he illustrated more than 130 books by other authors. He worked as a cover artist for Dell Publishing Co. Inc. (later Gold Key) designed and produced by Western Publishing and Lithography Co. His comic book illustrations included Gene Autry's Champion, Roy Rogers' Trigger and The Lone Ranger's Hi-Yo Silver, as well as The Cisco Kid, and Ben-Hur. His work appeared in magazines that included Equus, The Chronicle of the Horse, Equine Images, Arizona Highways, Boys’ Life, Western Horseman and Sports Illustrated.

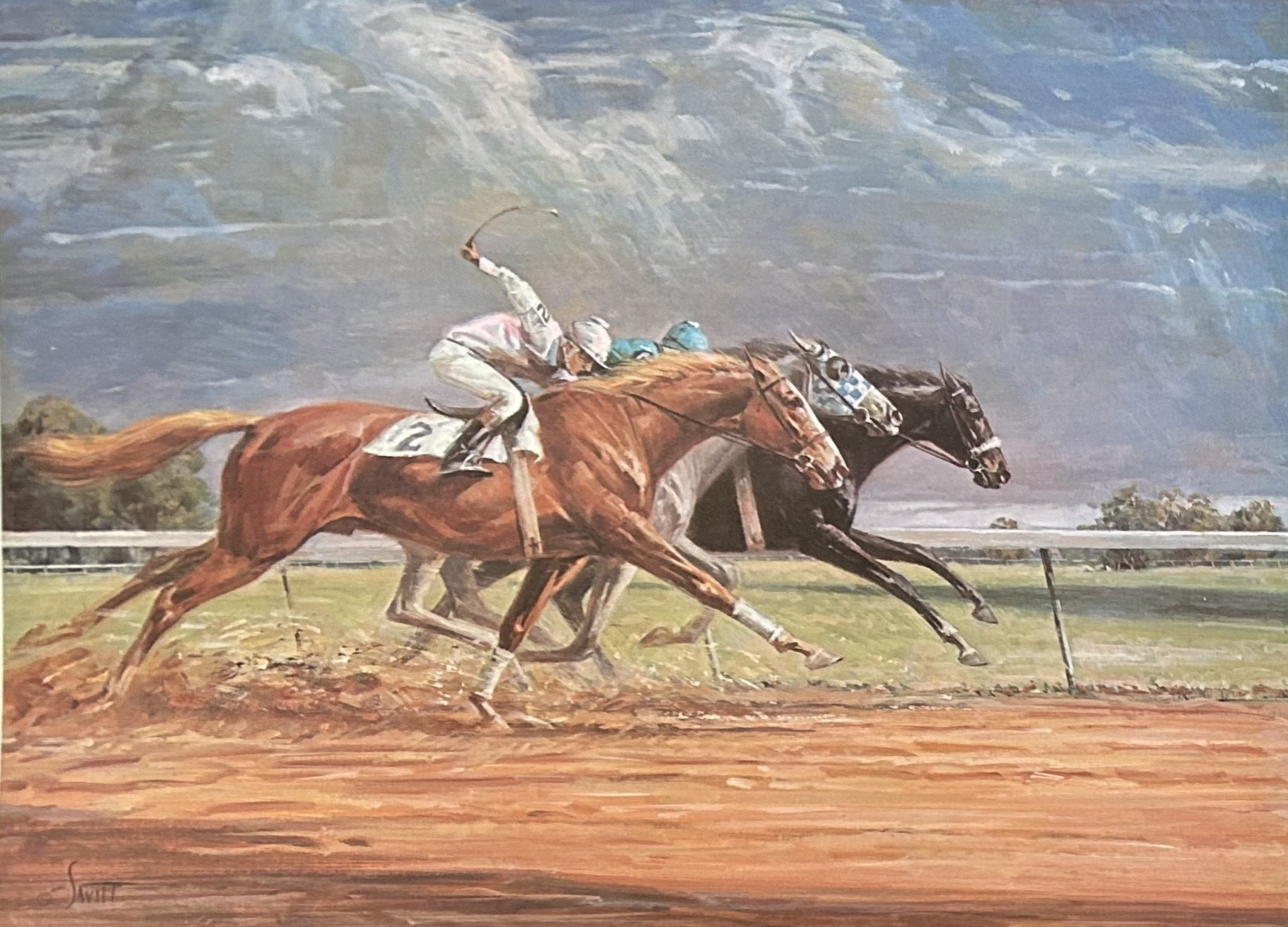
Savitt created this painting called "Last Race of the Day" in 1988.

In 1998 Savitt was awarded the Lifetime Achievement Award from the North American Horseman's Association. The association had previously awarded him the title of Equine Artist of Distinction. Equus Magazine included him in their list of the world's most influential horsemen of the 20th century. Savitt is the cofounder of the American Academy of Equine Art, with Henry Koehler, Marilyn Newmark, and June Harrah. With his wife, Bette, he opened Black Horse Press in 1963, which sold his charts and reproductions of his pieces. His works have been used as the illustrative basis of home furnishings and décor by various companies.

== Later life and death ==
Savitt died at the age of 83, in 2000.

== List of works ==
=== Author ===
- Step-A-Bit; the Story of a Foal (1956)
- Midnight, Champion Bucking Horse (1957)
- There was a Horse (1961)
- Around the World with Horses (1962)
- Rodeo: Cowboys, Bulls, and Broncos (1963)
- Vicki and the Black Horse (1964)
- A Day at the LBJ Ranch (1965)
- America's Horses (1966)
- The Equestrian Olympic Sketchbook (1969)
- True Horse Stories (1970)
- Ups and Downs; A first guide to riding and horse care (1973) (co-author: Suzanne Wilding)
- Wild Horse Running (1973)
- How to take care of your horse until the vet comes (1975) (co-author: Herb Marlin)
- Vicki and the Brown Mare (1976)
- Great Horses of the United States Equestrian Team (1977) (co-author: William Steinkraus)
- The Dingle Ridge Fox and Other Stories (1978)
- Draw Horses with Sam Savitt (1981)
- One Horse, One Hundred Miles, One Day: the story of the Tevis Cup endurance ride (1981)
- A Horse to Remember (1984)

=== Illustrator (selected) ===
- Shasta and Gimmery by Olaf Baker (1958)
- Lad: A Dog by Albert Payson Terhune (1959 40th anniversary edition)
- Pets at the White House by Carl Carmer (1959)
- A Saddlebag of Tales; a collection of stories by members of Western Writers of America (1959)
- Fury and the Mustangs by Albert G. Miller (1960)
- The Top Hand of Lone Tree Ranch by Anne Davis (1960)
- Horse in Her Heart by Patsey Gray (1960)
- Horseback Riding (A Sports Illustrated book) (1960)
- Alcatraz, the Wild Stallion by Max Brand (1961)
- Born to Race by Blanche Chenery Perrin (1962)
- Dinny and Dreamdust by Doris McFerran Townsent (1962)
- Fawn in the Forest by Jim Kjelgaard (1962)
- The Pony that Didn't Grow by Elizabeth Harrover Johnson (1963)
- Show Ring Rogue by Patsey Gray (1963)
- Two Dogs and a Horse by Jim Kjelgaard (1964)
- Wild Horse Tamer by Glenn Balch (1964)
- The Big Book of Favorite Horse Stories by P.C. Braun, ed. (1965)
- Big Jump for Robin by Suzanne Wilding (1965)
- Christy Finds a Rider by Elizabeth Harrover Johnson (1965)
- Dave and his Dog, Mulligan by Jim Kjelgaard (1966)
- About Horses by Luther Dexter (1968)
- The Golden Book of Horses by George McMillan (1968)
- Ride, Gaucho by Bruce Grant (1969)
- Sky Rocket; the story of a little bay horse by Margaret Cabell Self (1970)
- Wild Animal Rescue! by Bryan O'Donoghue (1971)
- How to Bring Up Your Pet Dog; choosing, understanding, training, protecting, enjoying by Kurt Unkelbach (1972)
- Hundred Horse Farm by Blanche Chenery Perrin (1973)
- Summer Pony by Jean Slaughter Doty (1973)
- A Boy and a Pig, but Mostly Horses by Sherman Kent (1974)
- The Gallant Gray Trotter by John T. Foster (1974)
- Backyard Pony: selecting and owning a horse by Frederick L. Devereux (1975)
- How to Take Care of your Horse Until the Vet Comes: a horse health and first aid guide by Herb Marlin (1975)
- Horse Tales by Suzanne Wilding, ed. (1976)
- The Tale of the Horse by Walter L. Field (1977)
- Pluto: Brave Lipizzaner Stallion by Anne Colver (1978)
- Springfellow by Robert Kraus (1978)
- How to Teach an Old Dog New Tricks: retraining the secondhand dog by Kurt Unkelbach (1979)
- My Mane Catches the Wind, poems about horses (1979)
- Hiboy: Young Devil Horse by Justin F. Denzel (1980)
- The Horses of San Simeon by Austine McDonnell Hearst (1985)
