= Max Schoen =

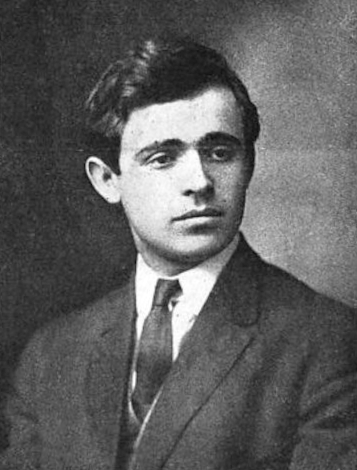
- In Musical Advance, August 1923
- Born: February 11, 1888; Austro-Hungarian Empire
- Died: May 27, 1959 (aged 71); Pittsburgh, Pennsylvania, US
- Education: City College of New York; University of Iowa
- Occupation(s): Music educator, psychologist, scholar

Max Schoen (February 11, 1888 – May 27, 1959) was an American music educator, psychologist and scholar.

== Life ==
Max Schoen was born in the Austro-Hungarian Empire on February 11, 1888. He came to the United States in 1900, and was naturalized as a US citizen in 1918. He gained his BA from the City College of New York in 1911 and a PhD from the University of Iowa in 1921. He taught at Carnegie Institute of Technology from 1922 until 1947, retiring as Professor and Head of the Department of Psychology and Education. After retirement he held visiting lectureships at Coe College, Iowa and Fisk University in Nashville.

He died in Pittsburgh on May 27, 1959.

== Works ==
- (ed.) The Effects of Music. A series of essays, London: Kegan Paul & Co., 1927. The International Library of Psychology, Philosophy and Scientific Method
- The beautiful in music, London: K. Paul, Trench, Trubner & Co., 1928
- Human nature: a first book in psychology, New York & London: Harper & Brothers, 1930
- Art and beauty, New York: The Macmillan Company, 1932
- The psychology of music: a survey for teacher and musician, New York: Ronald Press, 1940
- (with Laurance F. Schaffer and B. von Haller Gilmer) Psychology, New York: Harper, 1940
- Bibliography of experimental studies on the psychology of music to 1936, 1940/1941
- (ed.) The enjoyment of the arts, New York: Philosophical Library, 1944
- Human nature in the making, Kingswood: Worlds Work, 1947
- (with H. G. Schrickel and Van Meter Ames) Understanding the world: an introduction to philosophy, New York & London: Harper & Bros, 1947
- (ed. with Dorothy M. Schullian) Music and medicine, New York: H. Schumann, 1948
- The man Jesus was, New York: A. A. Knopf, 1950
- (ed.) The effects of music: a series of essays, Freeport, N.Y.: Books for Libraries Press, 1968
