= Jacqui Morgan =

American illustrator and painter

Jacqui Morgan, (February 22, 1939 – July 3, 2013) born Jacquelynn Morganstern in New York, was an American illustrator, educator and watercolour painter. She became influential during the 1960s and 1970s with the youthful and psychedelic style of her illustrations. She was one of the first female commercial illustrator/designers in the United States. Her 1967 poster for the New York City club Electric Circus is considered a milestone of 20th century graphic design.

== Biography ==
She studied at Pratt Institute, graduating with a BFA, and Hunter College, City University of New York, where she earned an MA degree. Morgan originally worked in textile design. She travelled to Europe, and returned to the United States after a year. She began working as a free-lance illustrator in New York City in 1963.

== Career ==
In 1967, Morgan produced a poster for the New York City nightclub Electric Circus, which was part of the counter-culture scene in the East Village neighborhood in Manhattan. Electric Circus was frequented by Andy Warhol, The Velvet Underground, and was the home of the Exploding Plastic Inevitable. Morgan, working in concentrated watercolor, ink, and coloured pencil, had developed a style she would describe as "anthropomorphic double-images". Surreal juxtapositions, bright rainbow-like colour patterns, nude figures, and curved lines are characteristic of her works. She produced a poster for Electric Circus that became influential in the graphic design world, and Morgan became in high demand as an illustrator.

Following the poster for Electric Circus, Morgan worked on commissions for clients as diverse as financial services firms and the United Nations. She created illustrations for newspaper and magazine advertising, posters, calendars, magazine covers, record album covers, books, book covers, and billboards. Morgan created the iconic poster for Year of the Woman 1971. Other iconic posters include the 1973 poster for the American Optometric Association, Purina, The Joy of Seeing which was copied on several occasions for clothing and a book cover. Billboards include Celanese, Thai Air, 7up, Swedish Tanning Secret, Exxon, and Ritz Disco. Calendars include those done for Nissan, has also done several Broadway show posters including Wine Spectator and Wines of Spain.

Morgan became a prominent female illustrator/designer at a time when they were a rarity. For several years she was one of only three full-time female illustrators in the United States, along with Barbara Nessim and Lorraine Fox. In recent decades, she has produced a number of works in an exaggerated hyper realism using color to push volume and depth with her focus on figurative works done from life.

With a partner, she launched a line of clothing, including T-shirts, jackets, and dresses incorporating silk-screen and airbrush designs under the name "Mag Jac". Morgan taught at the Fashion Institute of Technology in New York City. Her watercolor classes drew students from a wide variety of backgrounds and ages. Her last personal work was painting the nude from life.

Morgan also worked as a watercolour artist. In 1986, she published the book Watercolour for Illustration. She has also published Jacqui Morgan's Journey (2007); MOSTLY NUDE: Watercolors from Life (2010); and ALMOST NUDE: Watercolors from Life (2011).

== Death ==
She died July 3, 2013, in her Queens, New York residence.
