= Susan L. Talbott =

American curator (born 1949)

Susan Lubowsky Talbott (born 1949) is an American curator and former director of the Wadsworth Atheneum.

== Education ==
Talbott graduated from Pratt Institute and Harvard University's Art Museum Directors' Program.

== Career ==
Before coming to the Atheneum, Talbott was director of Smithsonian Arts at the Smithsonian Institution for three years. From 1998 to 2005, she was CEO of the Des Moines Art Center.

Roberta Smith, art critic for The New York Times, gave Talbott "much of the credit" for making the key decisions in the widely admired renovation the Atheneum completed in 2015. She is credited not merely with finding funders for the museum's complete renovation, but also with growing the endowment.

Talbott announced her intention to retire in the fall of 2015.
