= David Nyzio =

American sculptor

Adventures in Articulation I by David Nyzio, 1994, algae on paper and steel, Honolulu Museum of Art

David Nyzio (born 1958) is an American artist whose work bridges the gap between art and science.

He was born in Massachusetts, received a BFA from Southeastern Massachusetts University (North Dartmouth, Massachusetts) in 1982 and received an MFA from Pratt Institute (Brooklyn, New York) in 1986. The artist lives and works in Brooklyn, New York.

Nyzio is best known for his use of plants, especially the blue-green algae cyanobacteria Oscillatoria. Adventures in Articulation I, in the collection of the Honolulu Museum of Art, is a self-portrait rendered in algae. To create this work, the artist suspended a glass negative over a tank of water containing algae and a sheet of paper. An overhead light caused the algae to grow on the paper only where the light could pass through the negative.
