= Robert Vargas =

American muralist and portrait artist

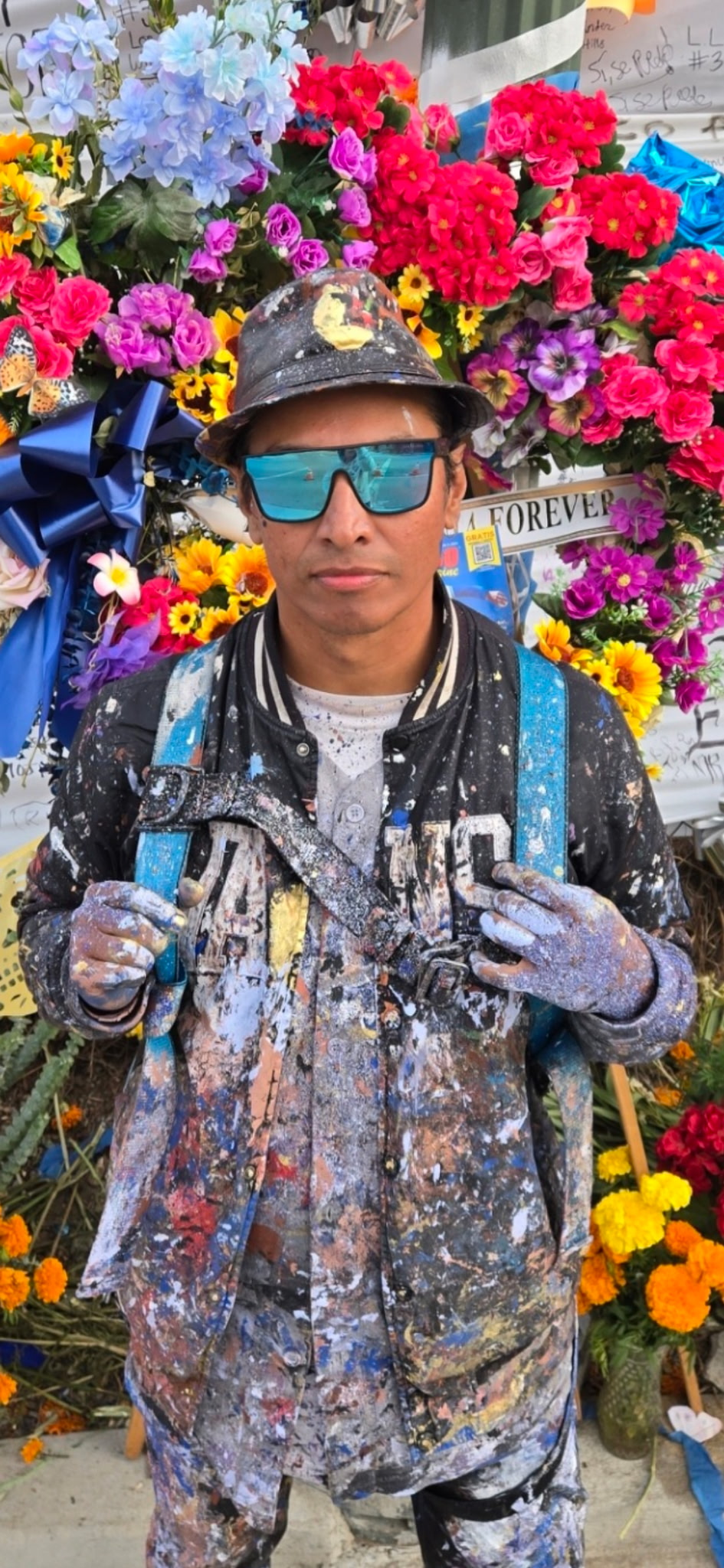
- Vargas at work, Los Angeles, November 2024
- Born: Boyle Heights, Los Angeles, California, U.S.
- Education: Los Angeles County High School for the Arts, Pratt Institute
- Known for: Mural, portrait art
- Awards: Honorary doctorate, Art Center College of Design (2024)

Robert Vargas is an American contemporary artist based in Los Angeles, known for large-scale freehand murals and mixed-media portrait work. His murals and portraits appear on prominent buildings across downtown Los Angeles and in cities in Europe, the Middle East, and Asia. Raised in Boyle Heights, Vargas studied at the Los Angeles County High School for the Arts and later at Pratt Institute in Brooklyn, New York.

Coverage of Angelus, a 14-story mural near Pershing Square, has described Vargas as painting the work freehand without grids or projections. He is also known for Our Lady of DTLA. In 2024, he completed LA Rising, a 150-foot Shohei Ohtani mural on the Miyako Hotel in Little Tokyo, and later that year painted large public tributes to pitcher Fernando Valenzuela in Boyle Heights and at Dodger Stadium.

== Early life and education ==
Vargas was raised in Boyle Heights. He began painting murals at the age of ten.

At age 16, his work was featured in murals at the Autry Museum of the American West, and at 17, he was commissioned to paint a mural at the Edmund D. Edelman Children's Court. Vargas attended the Los Angeles County High School for the Arts (LACHSA) and later studied at the Pratt Institute in Brooklyn, New York.

== Career ==
Vargas has created murals in Los Angeles neighborhoods including Boyle Heights, Little Tokyo, and downtown Los Angeles, and has also completed projects internationally. His work often foregrounds local residents, Indigenous histories, and cultural icons.

In 2013, he completed Our Lady of DTLA at 6th and Spring Streets in downtown Los Angeles. In 2017, Vargas began work on Angelus, a 14-story mural near Pershing Square.

In 2019, Vargas held his solo exhibition Från Själen at the VIDA Museum in Örebro, Sweden. The same year, he collaborated with NBC Peacock in developing visual content that highlighted Chicano and Mexican American cultural themes for the platform's brand identity and promotional materials. In 2019, Vargas painted a mural of Mötley Crüe on the façade of the Whisky a Go Go in West Hollywood to coincide with the release of the Netflix biopic The Dirt. In 2021, he created Long Live the King, a 17-foot-tall mural honoring Eddie Van Halen on the exterior wall of Guitar Center on the Sunset Strip.

In March 2024, Vargas completed LA Rising, a large-scale mural of baseball player Shohei Ohtani on the Miyako Hotel in Little Tokyo. Following the death of Fernando Valenzuela in 2024, Vargas painted memorial murals honoring the pitcher in Boyle Heights and at Dodger Stadium.

Vargas has also painted major murals for organizations engaged in food justice and health care, including Project Angel Food, the AIDS Healthcare Foundation's Food for Health program, St. Jude Children's Research Hospital, and Children's Hospital Los Angeles. Actor and activist Edward James Olmos has praised Vargas's work, saying that he "brings a deep humanity to everything he does, anywhere in the world."

== Philanthropy and community work ==
Vargas has contributed artwork and participated in fundraising initiatives for organizations focused on food access and health equity. He has worked with Project Angel Food, a Los Angeles-based nonprofit that delivers medically tailored meals to individuals facing serious illnesses. He has also supported the AIDS Healthcare Foundation's Food for Health program, which addresses food insecurity for people living with HIV/AIDS.

Following the Eaton Fire, Vargas assisted with recovery efforts by creating art to support displaced families and participating in community relief activities in the affected Los Angeles County areas. He has supported St. Jude Children's Research Hospital and Children's Hospital Los Angeles through art donations and participation in charity events.

== Honors ==
In 2021, the Los Angeles City Council proclaimed September 8 as Robert Vargas Day in the City of Los Angeles. In 2022, the City Council designated an intersection in Boyle Heights as Robert Vargas Square in recognition of his contributions to Los Angeles art.

In 2024, Vargas received an honorary Doctor of Humane Letters from Art Center College of Design and delivered the commencement address at the college's spring graduation. That same year, he received the Excellence in the Arts Award from the Mexican American Legal Defense and Educational Fund (MALDEF).

In 2026, the Los Angeles County Board of Supervisors proclaimed January 24 as Robert Vargas Day in Los Angeles County.
