= Sam Chinkes =

American artist and designer (1922–2019)

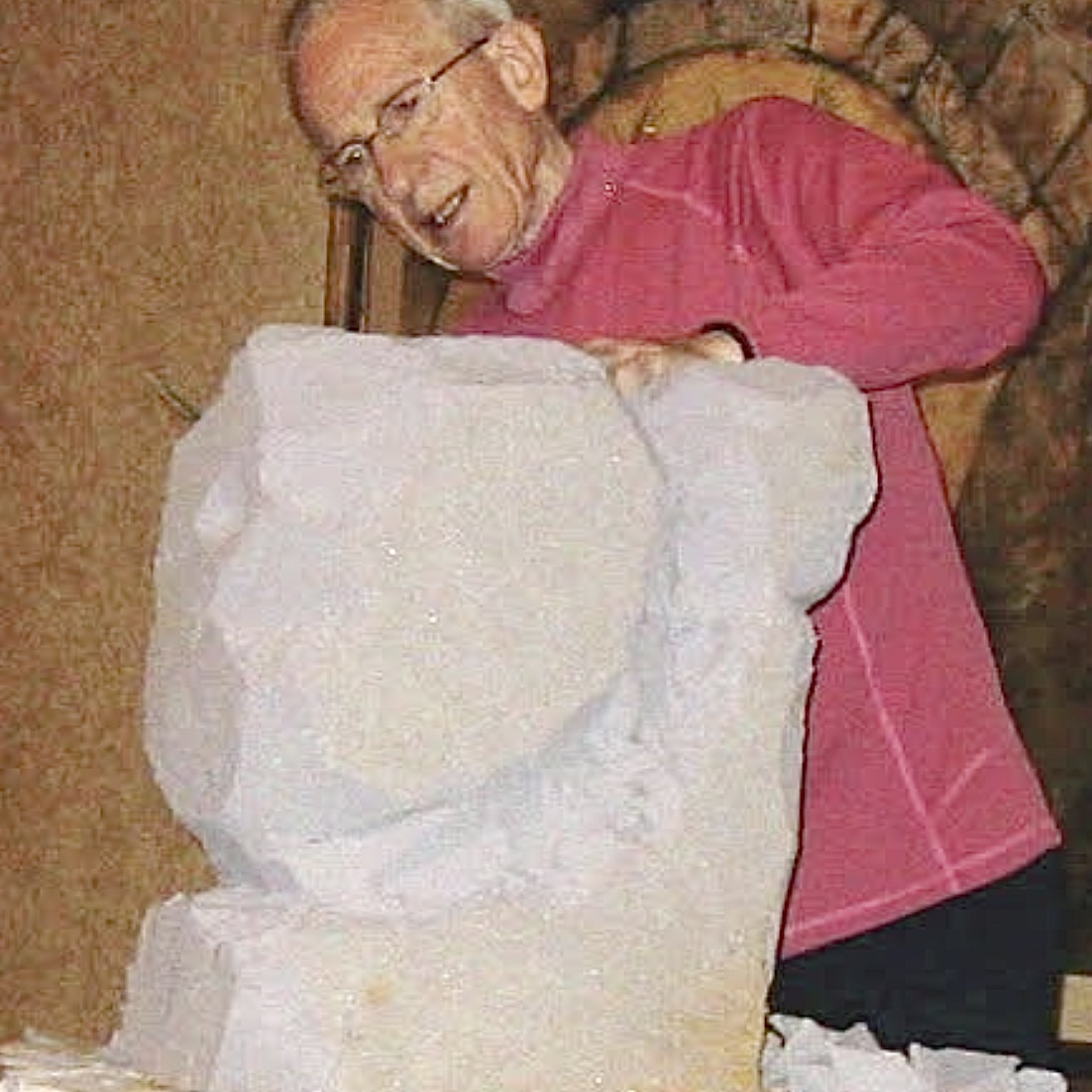
- Sam Chinkes at work, 2003
- Born: September 1, 1922; Brooklyn, New York, U.S.
- Died: April 10, 2019 (aged 96); Las Vegas, Nevada, U.S.
- Occupations: Artist, designer

Sam Chinkes (September 1, 1922 – April 10, 2019) was an American artist and designer known for his abstract sculptures, photography, and packaging design.

== Early life and education ==
Chinkes was born in New York to Anna Chinkes and Max Chinkes, the owner of a camera store. Sam Chinkes worked at the store when he was a teenager. He began to draw the "first time he picked up a pencil."

He served in the United States Army during World War II. He produced a series of paintings and photographs depicting his experiences while stationed in Greenland.

Following his discharge, Chinkes attended the Veterans Art Center and studied industrial design at Pratt Institute and the Art Students League of New York, where he studied under Reginald Marsh. He attended a summer program with Marsh's students, including Roy Lichtenstein.

== Career ==
=== Advertising and design ===
In 1960, Chinkes founded Sound Advertising, an advertising and public relations agency specializing in packaging design. He was featured in trade and business publications including Modern Packaging, Modern Plastics, Chief Executive Magazine, Candy and Confectionery, and Playthings Magazine. He was a judge for local, national, and regional contests for Mattel.

=== Art and sculpture ===
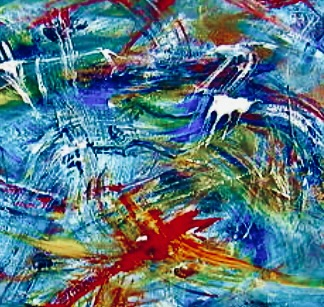
Blues and Others, 2010

Chinkes initially worked with plaster as a sculptor before he transitioned to foam blocks, which he shaped using metal files, in the 1990s. He referred to his sculptures as "spontaneous foam sculptures". They were meant to be touched. His sculptures and paintings were exhibited at institutions including the Nevada Museum of Art, the Nevada Institute of Contemporary Art and the Gobel-Lowden Veterans Museum, where his World War II Self Portrait was prominently featured.

== Personal life ==
Chinkes, who regularly attended UFC matches, was known in the mixed martial arts community as one of the sport's oldest fans. He was profiled on The Ultimate Fighter in 2010; he was 88 at the time.

In addition to creating sculptures that the visually impaired could touch, he read for the blind through a radio reading service. In a 2000 interview with the Las Vegas Review-Journal, he said he hoped to establish a permanent gallery for the visually impaired. He often wrote tongue-in-cheek letters to the editor on subjects including education, the arts, taxes, bureaucracy, and public works.
