= Martin Beck (painter) =

American painter

- Born: 1962 (age 63–64); Niagara Falls, New York
- Education: University at Buffalo; Carnegie Mellon University
- Notable work: A Man For Our Time

Martin Beck (born 1962) is an American painter who live and works in Lexington, Kentucky.

== Early life ==
Beck's "social conscience grew up with him about 20 blocks from the famous suburban Love Canal eco-disaster in Niagara Falls, New York." Beck received a BFA from State University of New York at Buffalo in 1986 and an MFA from Carnegie Mellon University in 1992.

== Career ==
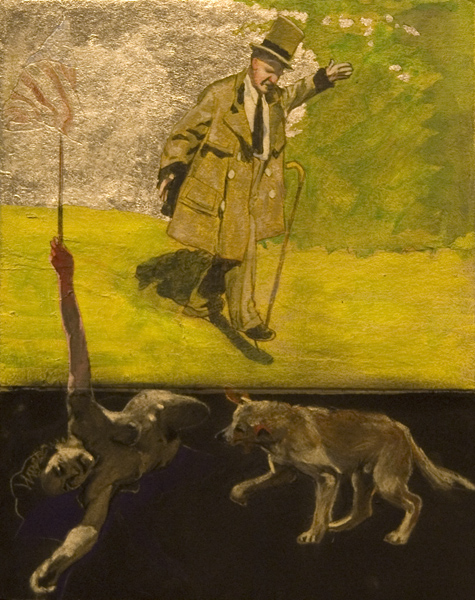
A Man For Our Time, 2008

Martin Beck is a noted artist who received two New Jersey State Council on the Arts Fellowships, (1994, 2000). He is featured on the Discover Jersey Arts Artists Gallery. Beck's exhibitions have been reviewed in ArtPapers, The New York Times, The Sunday Star Ledger and has also been featured in American Artist, (July 1999). Beck's work can be found in private collections primarily in New York, NY, Pittsburgh, PA and Santa Monica, CA. His portrait commissions include corporate clients such as Carnegie Mellon University Highlands Circle, and private clients.

== Solo exhibitions ==
- M.S. Rezny Studio Gallery, Recent Work, 2/19/2019 – 3/30/2019. Lexington, KY
- Mill and Max Gallery, Figure Drawing: Two Views, 9/9/2016– 10/16/2016. Lexington, KY
- Lexington Art League, Fourth Friday: A Figure Study. 1/22/2016 - 2/5/2016. Lexington, KY
- Chamot Gallery, Modern Romance. 3/15/2001 - 4/29/2001. Jersey City, NJ.
- Discover Jersey Arts, Discover Jersey Arts Online Showcase. 2/1/2001 - 3/1/2001. Trenton, NJ.
- Consolidated Arts at Historic Downtown S.I.D. Office Gallery, Black Drawings and Other Works. 9/25/2000 - 12/14/2000. Jersey City, NJ.
- Mercer County Community College, Modern Romance. 1/9/1999 - 2/11/1999. Trenton, NJ.
- Jersey City Museum, White. 3/11/1998 - 5/30/1998. Jersey City, NJ.
- David J. Brodsky Gallery, Recent Work. 9/26/1995 - 10/27/1995. Princeton, NJ.
- Birke Gallery, Recent Work. 9/1/1995 - 9/21/1995. Huntington, WV.
- The Contemporary Arts Center, Recent Work. 6/7/1995 - 8/6/1995. Cincinnati, OH.
- Hewlitt Gallery, MFA Thesis Exhibition. 4/22/1992 - 7/29/1992. Pittsburgh, PA.
- Carson Street Gallery, Recent Work. 4/14/1992 - 4/20/1992. Pittsburgh, PA.

== Group exhibitions ==
- Moon Gallery, Berry College, Blot, 10/17/2018– 12/15/2018. Mt. Berry, GA
- Larkin Arts, National Juried Show, 10/5/2018 – 10/27/2018. Harrisonburg, VA
- Lexington Art League, The League: Members Exhibition, 9/14 /2018– 10/14/2018. Lexington, KY
- Dutchess County Art Association/Barrett Art Center, New Directions 2018, 10/6/2018 – 11/17/2018. Poughkeepsie, NY
- Healdsburg Center for the Arts, Figure Study- Hidden Story, 9/8/2018 - 10/21/2018. Healdsburg, CA
- ARC Gallery, Pride and Prejudice, 6/20/2018 – 7/14/2018. Chicago, IL
- Verum Ultimum Art Gallery, 5th Annual Living Mark Exhibition, 6/30/2018 – 7/30/2018. Portland, OR
- The Arts Council of Southeast Missouri, Art and Fear, 6/1/2018 – 7/28/2018. Cape Girardeau, MO
- Studio Montclair Gallery, ViewPoints 2018, 6/2/2018 – 8/16/2018. Montclair, NJ
- Purdue University Galleries, Drawing Resurfaced II, 11/13/2017-12/15/2017. West Lafayette, IN. Catalogue
- George Segal Gallery, Art Connections 13, 11/19/2017-12/15/2017. Montclair, NJ
- Verum Ultimum Art Gallery, Chasing Ghosts II: Art that Pierces the Veil through remembrance, legacy, and beyond, 10/28/2017 – 11/17/2017. Portland, OR
- Reece Museum, FL3TCH3R Exhibit: Social and Politically Engaged Art, 10/9/2017 – 12/15/2017. Johnson City, TN. Catalogue
- Manifest Gallery, Nude, 8/18/2017 – 9/15/2017. Cincinnati, OH
- TAG Gallery, CA Open 2017, 8/9/2017 – 8/26/2017. Los Angeles, CA. Catalogue
- Lexington Art League, Demographically Speaking,1/27/2017 – 2/18/2017. Lexington, KY
- Zephyr Gallery, Drawn to Bodies, 9/2/2016– 10/22/2016. Louisville, KY
- Palette Gallery, Bodies, 8/3/2016 – 8/28/2016. Asbury Park, NJ
- The Santa Monica Museum of Art, Incognito 2009, 5/2/2009. Santa Monica, CA.
- MMMart, medana.art pomlad 2009. 4/18/2009 - 4/25/2009. Medana, Slovenia.
- University Art Gallery, Department of Studio Arts Faculty Exhibition. 10/1/2008 - 11/21/2008. Pittsburgh, PA.
- The Santa Monica Museum of Art, Incognito 2008. 5/3/2008. Santa Monica, CA.
- The Santa Monica Museum of Art, Incognito 2007. 4/28/2007. Santa Monica, CA.
- Regina Gouger Miller Gallery, Carnegie Mellon, 100% Centennial. 1/20/2006 - 3/5/2006. Pittsburgh, PA.
- The Santa Monica Museum of Art, incognito 2005. 12/10/2005. Santa Monica, CA.
- Allegheny College Penelec - Bowman - Megahan Art Galleries, 8-Hour Drawings . 9/6/2005 - 10/4/2005. Meadville, PA.
- Artists Image Resource, The War Room. 10/15/2004 - 10/17/2004. Pittsburgh, PA.
- Hunterdon Museum of Art, New Jersey State Council on the Arts Fellowship Exhibition 1999 & 2000. 12/3/2000 - 1/28/2001. Clinton, NJ. catalogue
- Concept Gallery, 30 Curators. 2/10/2000 - 4/8/2000. Pittsburgh, PA.
- City Without Walls, 18th Annual Metro Show. 1999. Newark, NJ.
- Museo de Art Moderno de la Republica Dominica, La Linea Dibujos Contemporaneous. 7/1/1998 - 8/30/1998. Santo Domingo, Dominican Republic. catalog
- Side Street Projects, Splice. 9/20/1997 - 12/15/1997. Santa Monica, CA. Catalog
- Bridge Cafe, In the Shadow of the Brooklyn Bridge. 9/26/1996 - 10/30/1996. New York, NY.
- MMC, Figure and Symbol. 9/10/1996 - 10/12/1996. New York, NY.
- Gallery 313, Sick Again. 6/28/1996 - 7/19/1996. New York, NY.
- Anderson Gallery, X-Sightings. 5/17/1996 - 7/17/1996. Buffalo, NY.
- Noyes Museum, 1994 - 1995 Fellowship Exhibition. 1/21/1996 - 3/24/1996. Oceanville, NJ. Catalogue
- Kunsthälle Hamburg, The Young Riders. 2/1/1994 - 3/1/1994. Hamburg, Germany.
- The Contemporary Arts Center, The Figure as Fiction. 12/3/1993 - 1/23/1994. Cincinnati, OH. Catalogue
- Pittsburgh Center for the Arts, Group A. 7/24/1992 - 8/16/1992. Pittsburgh, PA.
- Pittsburgh Center for the Arts, Art Beyond. 3/23/1991 - 4/21/1991. Pittsburgh, PA.
