= Barbara Segal =

American sculptor and stone carver

- Education: Pratt Institute
- Known for: Stone Carving, Public Art
- Website: http://www.barbarasegal.com/

Barbara Segal is a sculptor and stone carver based in Yonkers, New York.

== Early life and education ==
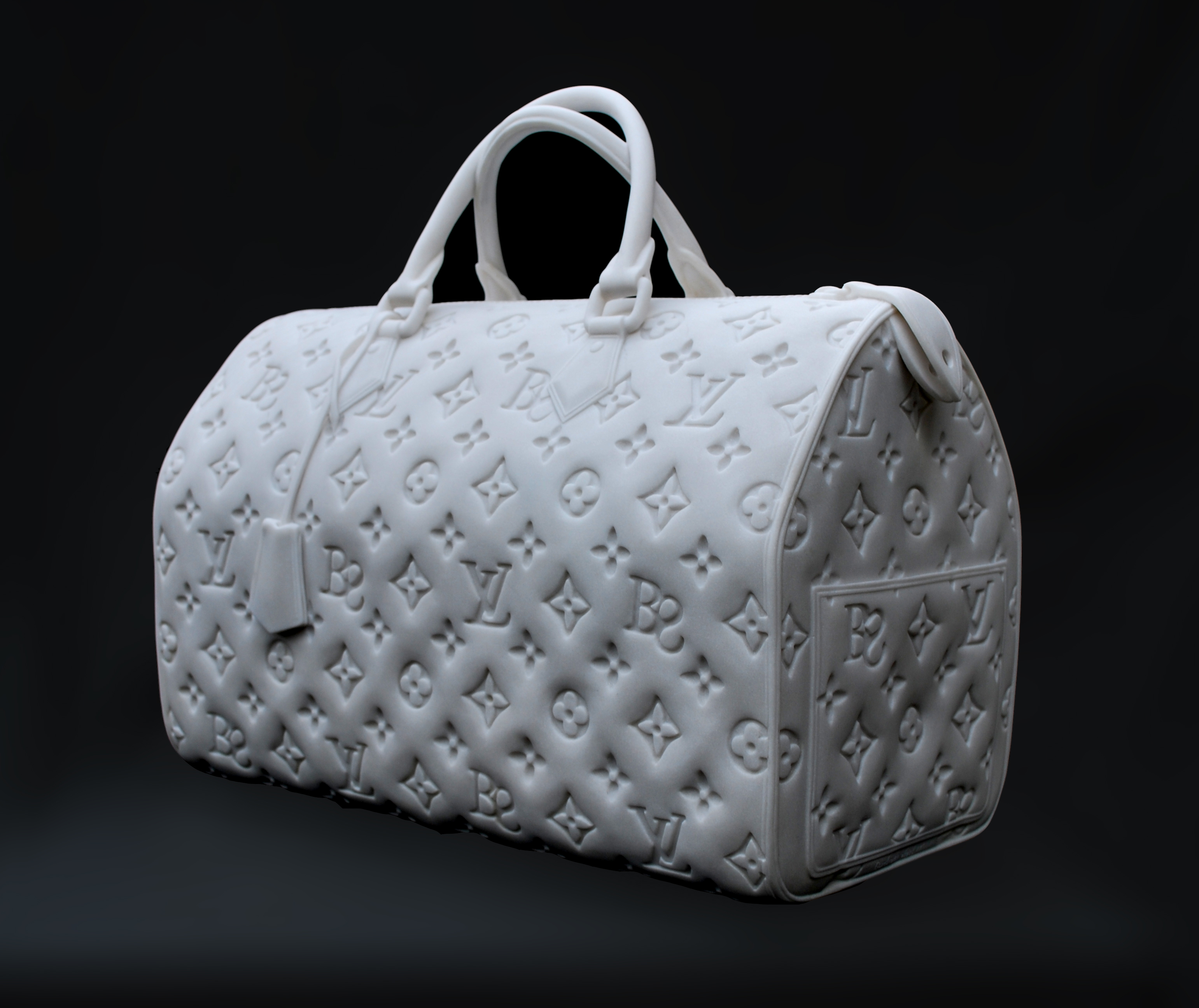
"Lvbs" 2017, White Greek Marble

Segal studied at Pratt Institute in New York City in the early 1970s and spent two years at the L'Ècole des Beaux-Arts in Paris. She worked in fine marble studios in Italy such as Tommasi Fonderia and SGF Studio Scultura, and with Jacques Lipshitz, Augustin Cárdenas, and Max Bill. She returned to New York in the late 70's and made product models for Avon Cosmetics in the 1980s.

== Work and career ==
Barbara Segal creates sculptures carved from stone such as marble, onyx, and calcite. She uses traditional carving tools such as chisels and stone cutters and acquires material from stone quarries all over the globe. Her work was inspired by the textures and patterns of the Renaissance and Baroque sculptures she saw while studying in France and Italy. In her TedX talk, she speaks on being inspired by cathedrals and the fact that she could see the hand of the artist in these architecture works. She re-recreates pop and fashion icons such as a Louis Vuitton handbag and a Chanel gift bag in stone. Her work explores society's fascination with status symbols and the impact they have on culture. By turning these cultural objects into 100-pound sculptures made from stone, Segal transforms them into the semblance of a historic relic. One of her larger pieces is a 3 foot tall Chanel bag that weighs 2,000 pounds.

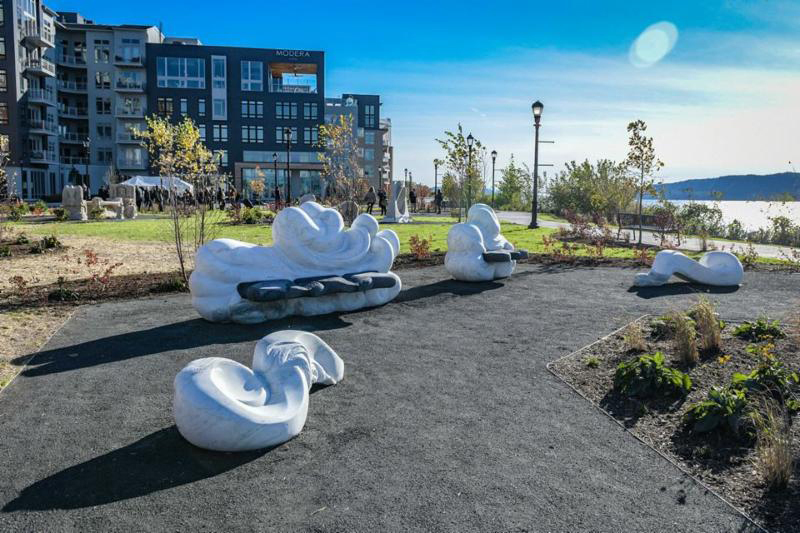
Cloud Living Room, at Yonkers Sculpture Meadow on the Hudson River, 2003

She has held solo exhibitions at The Neuberger Museum of Art, the Hudson River Museum, and Vassar College.

Segal teaches Sculpture at New York Academy of Art and at the School of Visual Arts in New York City. She also teaches workshops at her art studio in New York.

=== Public art ===
Segal worked alongside a group of artists to create the Yonkers Sculpture Meadow in 2003. Heading the project, her works for the Sculpture Meadow include functional furniture carved from stone titled Cloud Couch and Cloud Loveseat. Other artworks in the Sculpture Meadow include Susan Abraham's 'River Bedroom, Lou Lalli's Fish Loveseat, and Paul Greco's Meditation Circle. On organizing this project, Segal states "If you're going to make art in public places, it's not a bad idea to make it functional. This way we're giving the community something it needs anyway.''

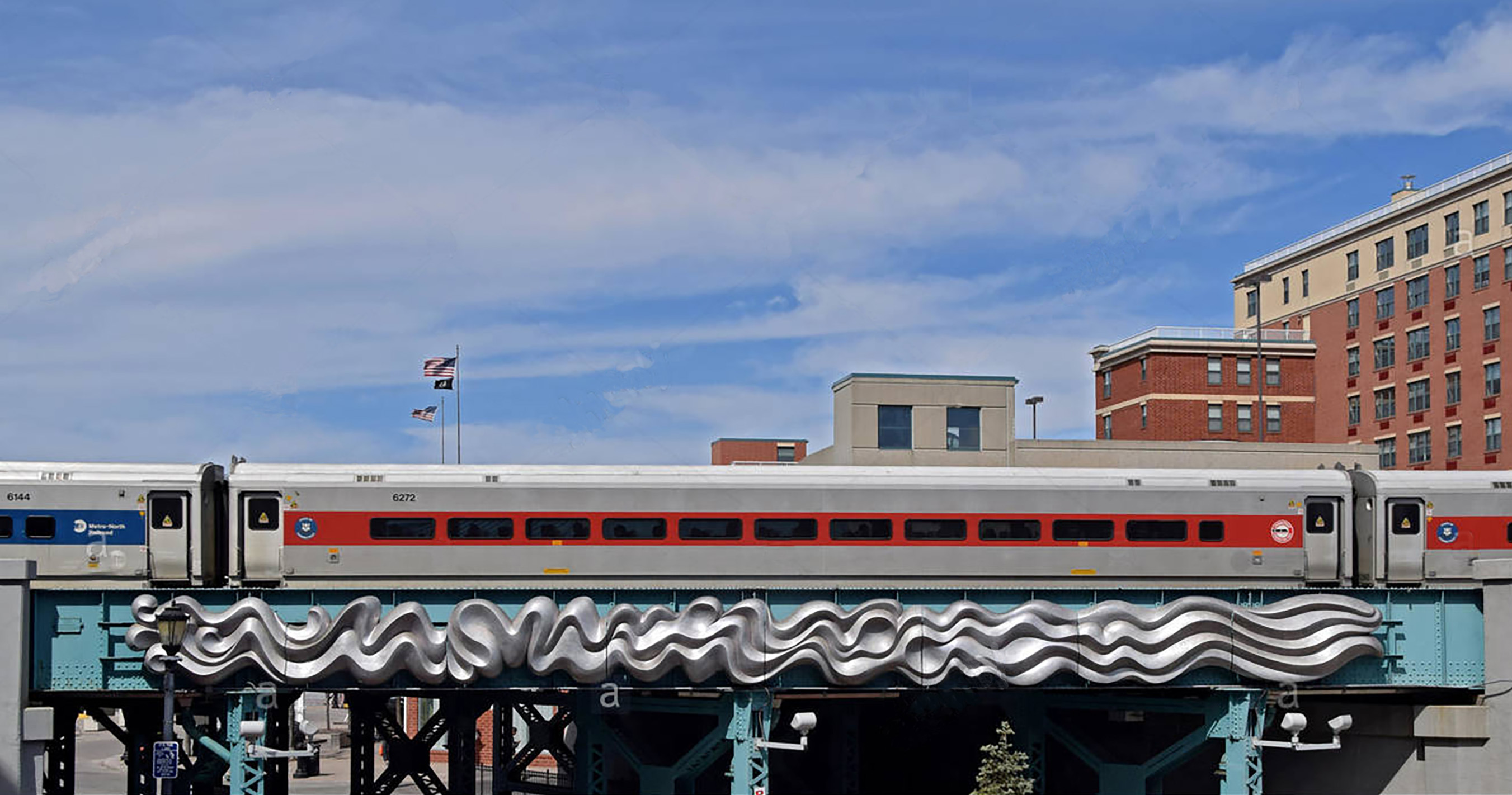
Muhheakantuck, the River that Flows Both Ways" 2005, Cast Aluminum, East Side of Yonkers Aqueduct

In 2005, she created a sculpture 72 feet long and 4 1/2 feet wide made of two cast aluminum reliefs called Muhheakantuck (The River that Flows Two Ways) that were installed on the bridge at Yonkers Station. The title, Muhheakantuck , is the name for the Hudson River used by the indigenous peoples that lived in this region before European settlement. The sculptures are abstract representations of the Hudson River. Segal has spoken on her interests in "unearthing that history and telling us its story through sculpture".

=== Social practice ===
Segal founded a Yonkers-based non-profit arts organization called Art on Main Street and was the executive director. This organization brought art to downtown Yonkers and was involved in the revitalization of the waterfront in the city. Segal founded Yonkers Arts in 2007 with a mission of community development and promoting the arts in Yonkers.

== Awards ==
She was awarded a Housing and Urban Development grant in 1995, a Mayoral Citation in 2007, an America for the Arts Award in 2008, a Yonkers Visionary Award in 2015, a New York State Assembly and Senate citations in 2015.

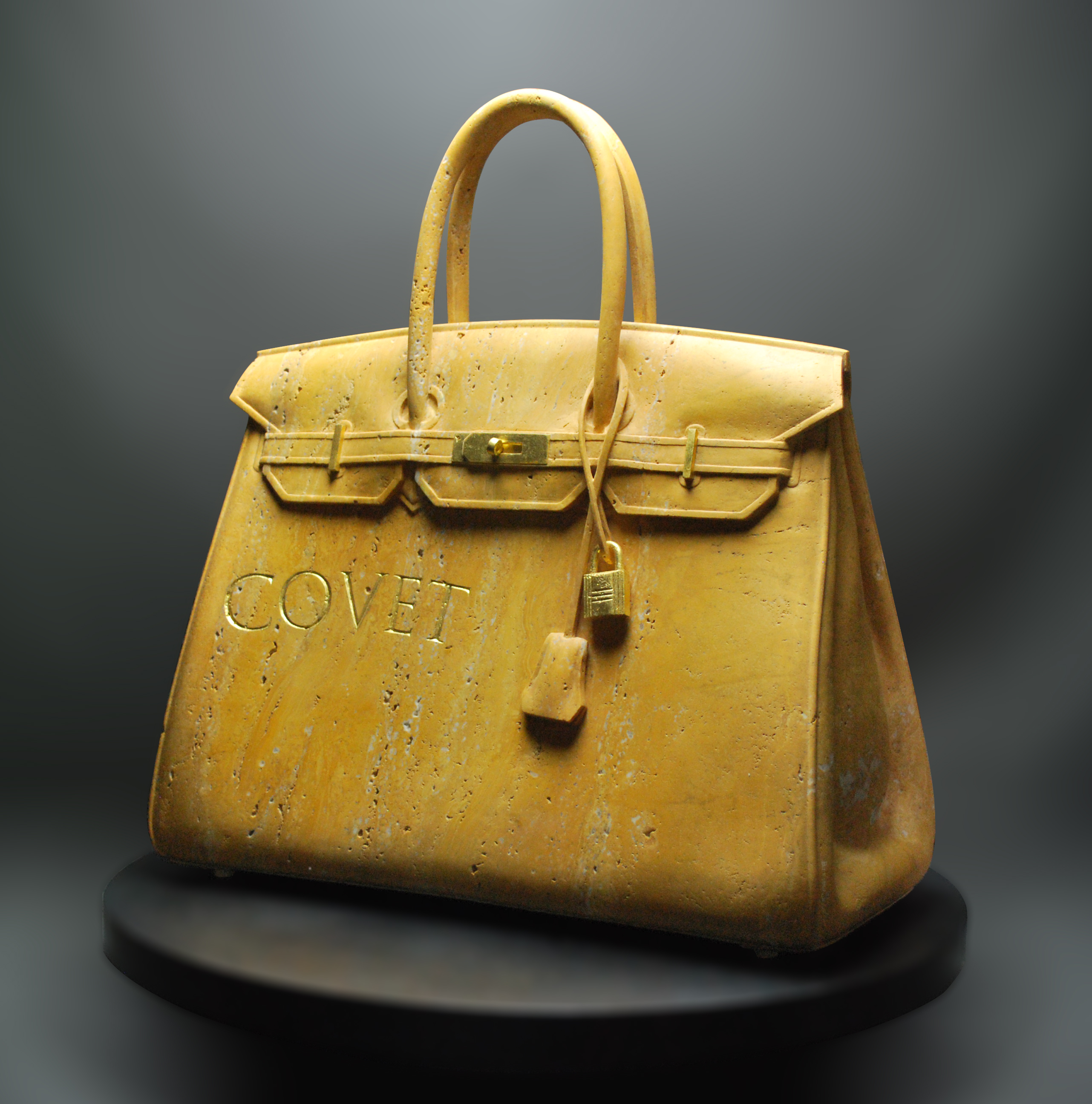
"Thou shalt not Covet" 2019, Yellow Travertine Marble and Gold Leaf

== Collections ==
Segal's work is in the collection at the MTA Arts for Transit, New York City Department of Parks and Recreation, the White House, the Neuberger Museum of Art and the private collections of Leslie Wexler and Malcolm Forbes.
