= Yngve Edward Soderberg =

American artist

- Born: December 21, 1896; Chicago, Illinois
- Died: August 6, 1972 (aged 75); Mystic, Connecticut, U.S.
- Education: School of the Art Institute of Chicago
- Known for: Painting, etcher

Yngve Edward Soderberg (December 21, 1896 – August 6, 1972) was an American artist whose career was centered on Mystic, Connecticut. He is credited with being a painter, etcher, writer, teacher, designer, and lithographer. He is best known for his etchings, America's Cup paintings and maritime watercolors.

== Early life ==
Soderberg was born in Chicago, Illinois to Swedish immigrants Berlin and Gust Soderberg. He was one of three children born. By age of twelve, Soderberg had already shown interest in drawing. He studied at the School of the Art Institute of Chicago and the Art Students League of New York. With a scholarship from the Art Institute of Chicago, he headed west for a summer of vagabonding in Yellowstone and British Columbia. In British Columbia, he sailed with fisherman, sailing small boats, building his own boats, and sailing in the big wind ships. His year at the Art Student's League in New York brought him the Kendall prize. In Chicago, Soderberg made money for his school and living expenses through architectural drawings and other forms of commercial art. He illustrated for articles in the Chicago Tribune and New York Herald-Tribune. When formal schooling was over, He travelled to Paris, Corsica, Normandy, and Brittany, and ultimately to Sweden with his sister.

== Connecticut ==
Upon returning from Europe, he headed to Mason's Island, off Mystic, Connecticut to spend the summer painting. It was a major turning point as it was here that he was to find the field art and sense of place which made him unique, for that time, among etchers. He ultimately built a cabin there with steam heat and a north-lighted studio. Previously, no one had made etchings of small sailboats. But Mason's Island proved to be a perfect subjects for his etchings. His front yard was full of boats. At first he focused on etchings, but later concentrated on watercolors. By 1930, Soderberg was painting America's Cup Defenders. His watercolors were regularly used for magazines including The Sportsman, Yachting, Town and Country, and The Spur. His watercolors were featured on the cover of The Sportsman Magazine four times including July 1933, May 1934, August 1934, and February 1935. He painted every America's Cup Race from 1930 and in 1937 sailed on the Endeavor II. His work was also part of the art competitions at the 1932 Summer Olympics and the 1936 Summer Olympics.

== Depression and WWII ==
In 1934 he married Nancy Horn, a summer resident of Mason's Island from Paterson, New Jersey, and an accomplished sailor. During the Depression years he became a Works Progress Administration artist. His WPA mural, "Canal Era" painted in 1939, is located in the Morrisville, Pennsylvania Post Office. He worked for the Electric Boat Company during WWII where he painted morale posters for shipyard workers. Some posters were as large as eighteen feet high and depicted the cycle of events in building a submarine. While staying in Hyannisport, Massachusetts with a friend, he made a watercolor of a Wyanno Class boat with the number 94 on her and the name Victura on the stern. She was being sailed by John F. Kennedy. The future President bought the painting. "The picture is extremely good, "John F. Kennedy wrote. By all accounts he survived the Depression by adapting, but clearly it was the sailboats and water that inspired him most. One critic of the time-period wrote, "His work grows in depth and strength every year. Nowhere can be found a line that is not expressing the artist's theme clearly and concisely."

== Later years ==
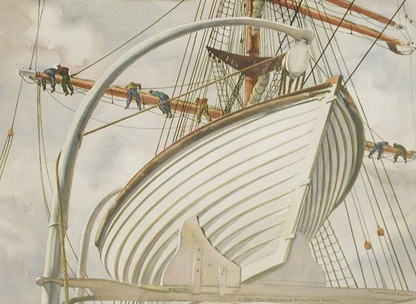
Life Boat, watercolor on paper, 50.8 cm x 91.44 cm, Collection of the Mattatuck Museum, Waterbury, CT.

At the end of World War II, Soderberg was invited to board the Danish cadet ship Danmark, which was interned in the Thames River at New London, Connecticut. He joined the Danmark as a guest artist and as a result painted one of his most critically acclaimed watercolors, Life Boat. At the annual Connecticut Water Color Society show in Hartford, Connecticut, Life Boat was called "the most dramatic picture in the show." At the First Annual Print Exhibition at the Brooklyn Museum, Life Boat won the Henry B. Shoppe prize.The painting is now held by the Mattatuck Museum in Waterbury Connecticut. In the following two years, Soderberg was also a guest artist aboard the US Coast Guard Training Ship Eagle. He made two summer cruises with landings in Bermuda, the Virgin Islands, Puerto Rico and Nassau. In 1950, he began a 17-year career teaching at the New London High School, but his summers were free for vagabonding again. In 1952, he traveled to Price Edward Island, Cape Breton and the coast of Maine, which became subjects for many of his watercolors. In 1954, the American Swedish Historical Foundation held an exhibition of his work. In 1958, Soderberg first authored his book Drawing Boats and Ships, 1958, which is still in publication today. In 1962, a large three-panel mural of the training bark Eagle was dedicated at the United States Coast Guard Academy. The Coast Guard acquired other works by Soderberg. He continued to remain active painting and illustrating throughout his career and in 1966 illustrated Stormalong Goes a Whaling.

Soderberg died in 1972 at the age of 75 in Mystic, Connecticut.

== Museum holdings ==
- Asheville Art Museum, Asheville NC
- Cummer Museum of Art, Jascksonville FL
- Denver Art Museum, Denver CO
- Herbert F. Johnson Museum of Art, Ithaca, NY
- Lyman Allen Museum, New London CT
- Mattatuck Museum, Waterbury CT
- Mystic Seaport Museum, Mystic CT
- Nelson-Atkins Museum of Art, Kansas City MO
- Portsmouth Abbey School, Portsmouth RI
- The Smithsonian Institution, Washington DC
- United States Post Office, Morrisville PA
- United States Coast Guard Academy, New London CT

== Exhibitions ==
- Art Institute of Chicago, 1930
- American International College, 1934, 1937
- National Academy of Design, 1935
- Chicago Society of Etchers, 1936
- Kennedy Gallery, NY
- Society of American Graphic Artists, 1945
- Grand Central Art Galleries, 1948 (solo), 1953 (solo)
- American-Swedish Museum, Philadelphia, 1954 (solo)
- Lyman Allyn Museum 1955 (solo), 1973
- Macbeth Gallery, 1929–1930
- Mystic, CT, 1959–60
- Meriden, CT, 1961
- Mystic Museum of Art, 2019

== Member ==
- Mystic Art Association: President 1951 – 1952.
- Society of American Graphic Artists
- Chicago Society of Etchers
- Society of American Etchers

== Bibliography ==
- Arts Magazine, Art Digest Inc, 1947
- Brewington, Dorothy E.R. Dictionary of marine artists, Peabody Museum of Salem, 1982. ISBN 978-0-913372-24-1
- Danielson, Robert Ely. The Sportsman Magazine, Concord, N.H., Sportsman Pub. Co., Incorporated, July 1933. LCCN 30-024003
- Danielson, Robert Ely. The Sportsman Magazine, Concord, N.H., Sportsman Pub. Co., Incorporated, May 1934. LCCN 30-024003
- Danielson, Robert Ely. The Sportsman Magazine, Concord, N.H., Sportsman Pub. Co., Incorporated, August 1934. LCCN 30-024003
- Danielson, Robert Ely. The Sportsman Magazine, Concord, N.H., Sportsman Pub. Co., Incorporated, February 1935. LCCN 30-024003
- Falk, Peter H. Who was who in American Art 1564–1975: 400 years of artists in America, Volume 3, Sound View Press, 1999. ISBN 0-9320-8757-4
- Fought, Leigh. A History of Mystic Connecticut, The History Press, 2007. ISBN 1-5962-9221-0
- King, Noelle Warden. Mystic as Muse: 100 Years of Inspiration, Mystic Connecticut: Mystic Arts Center, 2013. ISBN 978-0-615-80120-9
- Soderberg, Yngve Edward. Y.E. Soderberg. New York City: Grand Central Art Galleries, 1948
- Soderberg, Yngve Edward. Drawing boats & ships, New York : Pitman Pub. Corp., 1959. ISBN 0-4864-6033-9
- Steers, B. Macdonald (1966), Stormalong goes a-whaling; fabulous stories about Stormalong, the Paul Bunyan of the sea, Pequot Press, ISBN 1-2997-6184-4, LCCN 66022116
- Steers, B. Macdonald (1973). Yngve Edward Soderberg, December 21, 1896 – August 6, 1972: a retrospective exhibition of the development of an artist]. New London, Connecticut: Lyman Allyn Museum.
