= Jacob van Schalkwyk =

South African visual artist and writer (born 1979)

- Born: 20 September 1979 (age 46); Pretoria, South Africa
- Education: Pratt Institute
- Occupations: Visual artist; writer
- Relatives: A. G. Visser (great-grandfather)
- Website: jacobvanschalkwyk.com

Jacob van Schalkwyk (born 20 September 1979) is a South African visual artist and writer.

== Biography ==
Van Schalkwyk grew up in Pretoria, South Africa before moving to New York City to attend the Pratt Institute of Art and Design, where he majored in drawing. While obtaining his Bachelor of Fine Arts degree he was the recipient of the Pratt Circle Award for Academic Achievement in 2003 and editor of The Prattler. Van Schalkwyk returned to South Africa in 2008 and now lives in Sea Point, Cape Town.

== Art ==
Van Schalkwyk's work is rooted in abstraction, incorporating themes and ideas from mathematics as compositional tools. He is concerned with material and technique, born from a love of paper. Van Schalkwyk uses lithographic ink as a medium for painting and drawing. His works on paper conflate the distinction between printmaking, drawing, painting and low-relief sculpture.

Van Schalkwyk's work was represented by GALLERY AOP in Johannesburg from 2011 - 2016. A limited edition of 100 monographs Drawings 2011-2013 (ISBN 978-0-620-58954-3) was published by the gallery. In 2016, David Krut Projects took over the representation of his work. Van Schalkwyk's practise spans drawing, painting, printmaking, film and video, sculpture and installation.

Installation view of DOLCEFARNIENTE at David Krut Projects Cape Town.

Jacob van Schalkwyk, Waltz, 2016, 4 Plate sugarlift aquatint in various colours, Edition of 12, 66 x 54cm, Printed at the David Krut Workshop

=== Exhibitions ===
- 2017 DOLCEFARNIENTE, David Krut Projects, Johannesburg and Cape Town
- 2017 Atmosphere, David Krut Projects, New York City
- 2016 SUNSETS, David Krut Projects, Cape Town
- 2016 Open Dialog Box, Cape Town
- 2015 Drawing a Group Show, GUS Gallery, Stellenbosch
- 2011 2015 GALLERY AOP, FNB Joburg Art Fair, Johannesburg
- 2014, 2015 GALLERY AOP, Cape Town Art Fair, Cape Town
- 2014, 2015 Edinburgh International Fashion Festival, Scotland
- 2014 Topoi, Tropi, Apotropos, GALLERY AOP, Johannesburg
- 2013 Constraints, GALLERY AOP, Johannesburg
- 2013 Back to The Future, SMAC Gallery, Stellenbosch
- 2013 6+1...14+1; 1st, 2nd, Blank Projects, Cape Town
- 2012 FUN AND GAMES..., GALLERY AOP, Johannesburg
- 2012 When Form Becomes Attitude, Blank Projects, Cape Town
- 2012 Blank Projects, SUPERMARKET Art Fair, Stockholm, Sweden
- 2011 Bait al-Hikma, GALLERY AOP, Johannesburg
- 2010 Drawing Links, GALLERY AOP, Johannesburg
- 2002 SAIDA DE EMÉRGENCIA, Graduate exhibition, Pratt Institute, New York

=== Collections ===
Jacob van Schalkwyk has been included in private and corporate collections in South Africa, the United States and Europe.

- South African Reserve Bank Collection
- Telkom SA Collection
- Landstinget Dalarna Collection, Sweden
- Spier Art Collection
- Nando's Contemporary African Art Collection

== Writing ==
The Alibi Club, his debut novel detailing his time in Fort Greene, Brooklyn was published by Umuzi, a division of Penguin-Random House in 2014 in both Afrikaans and English. It was nominated for the Sunday Times Literary Award, the UJ Fiction Prize and SATI Award for Outstanding Translation.

=== Book reviews ===
- The Alibi Club by Karin Schimke.
- Hard-earned Swagger and Confidence at the Launch of Jaco van Schalkwyk's The Alibi Club by Books Live Sunday Times.

== Music ==
After graduating from the Pratt Institute of Art and Design, Van Schalkwyk collaborated with Carl Hancock Rux on his third studio album Good Bread Alley, and opera-oratorio MYCENAEAN before returning to South Africa. In South Africa he formed the Afrikaans art-punk duo Jaco+Z-dog with artist Zander Blom from 2009 to 2011. He performed as a guest vocalist on The Buckfever Underground's 2012 album Verkeerdevlei.

== Film ==
Van Schalkwyk participated in a number of short films by artist Michael Macgarry.

== Poetry ==
Van Schalkwyk is the great-grandson of A.G. Visser. Both he and Visser have had poetry published in Ons Kleintji.
