= Rowena Reed Kostellow =

American industrial designer

Rowena Reed Kostellow (July 6, 1900 – September 17, 1988) was an American industrial designer and professor. Alongside her husband, Alexander Kostellow, and other designers and artists, she co-founded the first industrial design education course at Pratt Institute.

== Early life and education ==
Rowena Reed was born in Kansas City, Missouri, on July 6, 1900, as a child of three born to a physician and housewife. She pursued a Bachelor of Arts degree in journalism from the University of Missouri and later studied sculpture at the Kansas City Art Institute.

== Career ==
After marrying Alexander Kostellow, they moved to New York City where she studied sculpting under the direction of Alexander Archipenko. She spent one year in Europe learning sculpting and painting before returning to North America. In 1929, the duo moved to Pittsburgh to teach at the Carnegie Institute of Technology, where they co-founded the institute's first industrial design education course.

By 1938, Reed and her husband were invited to the Pratt Institute by designer Donald Dohner to co-found Pratt's first industrial design department. Her husband stated that their teaching approach on industrial design "drew on modern scientific methods that supported self-expression as well as design for industry". As a result of her accomplishments in industrial design, she was named program chair in 1962, a position she held until 1966.

Reed Kostellow died on September 17, 1988, at the age of 88.
