= Martin L. Beck =

American architect

Martin L. Beck was an architect, artist, and professor of architecture.

== Biography ==
- Undergraduate work at Royal Institute of Technology, Budapest, Hungary
- Pratt Institute, Brooklyn, New York, 1922–23
- Graduate College, School of Architecture, Princeton University (1927–28), as winner of scholarship award in national competition.

== Academic career ==
He was appointed to the Princeton University faculty as assistant professor of architecture in 1928, and through 1942 taught courses in Architectural Design, Theory and Elements of Construction, Descriptive Geometry, Mechanical Drawing, etc. He was also appointed Lecturer in Education 1966, New York University, for Course and seminars in "School Plant Planning, Maintenance and Operation". He simultaneously carried on a professional practice.
