= Robert Lepper =

American artist and academic (1906–1991)

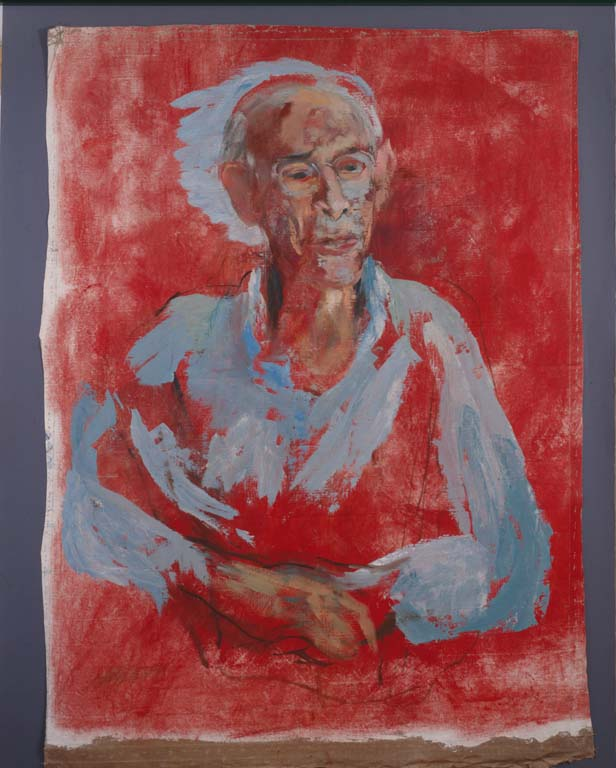
- Richard Rappaport, Robert L. Lepper, 1987
- Born: 1906
- Died: 1991 (aged 84–85)
- Known for: Sculptor, muralist, educator
- Movement: Industrial design and art
- Awards: 1989 Industrial Designers Society of America's (IDSA) Education Award

Robert Lepper (1906–1991) was an American artist and art professor at Carnegie Institute of Technology, now Carnegie Mellon University, who developed the country's first industrial design degree program. Lepper's work in industrial design, his fascination with the impact of technology on society and its potential role for artmaking formed the background for his class "Individual and Social Analysis", a two semester class focusing on community and personal memory as factors in artistic expression, which with his theoretical dialogues with his most promising students outside the classroom fostered the intellectual environment from which such diverse artists as Andy Warhol, Philip Pearlstein, Mel Bochner, and Jonathan Borofsky would later build their art practices.

== Early life and education ==
Robert Lepper was born September 10, 1906, in Aspinwall, Pennsylvania. His parents were Elizabeth L. and Charles W. Lepper, a purchasing agent for a gas company. Charles' parents were both born in Germany. Robert had an older brother, Charles.

He attended Carnegie Institute of Technology (CIT), graduating in 1927. From graduation until 1928, he went to Europe and explored contemporary art. He then was an artist for the Pittsburgh Sun-Telegraph and lived with his parents.

== Career ==
=== Carnegie Institute of Technology ===
Lepper taught art from beginning in 1930 and helped to establish one of the country's first industrial design degree program at Carnegie Institute of Technology in 1934. He defined visual perception elements: area, line, space, volume, color, value and texture - and then the equivalents in industrial design, published in the 1938 "The Elements of Visual Perception, linking art elements to manufacturing processes" article.

He taught a class entitled "Individual and Social Analysis," in which he encouraged students to look at ordinary items from their daily lives as potential works of art. One of his students was Andy Warhol, then Andrew Warhola, who drew upon his meals at home and made Campbell's Soup Cans. Other notable students include Warhol's friend Philip Pearlstein, illustrator Leonard Kessler, editorial cartoonist Jimmy Margulies, conceptual artist Mel Bochner and Joyce Kozloff, who developed an interest in public art when working on Lepper's Oakland Project in which students went out into the Oakland neighborhood and made paintings or drawings of the infrastructure, buildings and people. The project was written about in Richard Rappaport's 1989 paper Robert Lepper, Carnegie Tech, and the Oakland Project. The Oakland Project was the first semester of the Individual and Social Analysis course he started in 1947; The Retrospective was the second semester class for the program.

One of his students, Mark Mentzer, is currently a professor at the CMU School of Design. He is one of the oldest professors currently teaching at Carnegie Mellon.

=== Artist ===
Lepper created sculptures and murals, many of which reflect his interest in industrial objects. He developed the combination of powdered pigments and acrylic resin, or plastic, for artwork.

In 1932, he made Crankshaft. He made several murals under the Federal Arts Project (1935–1943) of the Works Progress Administration, including post offices in Grayling, Michigan, and Caldwell, Ohio. He made the "highly acclaimed" mural of area industries for the Mining Industries Building (also known as the new Mineral Industries Building) at West Virginia University between 1940 and 1942.

The main entrance of the Graduate School of Industrial Administration (GSIA) at Carnegie Mellon University has a sandblasted, bas-relief industrial mural made by Lepper in 1952. Robert Lepper made a number of public works: sculpture for the 1964 New York World's Fair. In the latter part of the 1960s he worked on his Transit Vehicle Design project to create more comfortable, angled passenger seats.

=== Awards ===
- 1961 - Craftsmanship Award, Pennsylvania Society of Architects of the American Institute of Architects
- 1975 - Respect and Admiration Award, Carnegie Mellon University
- 1989 - Industrial Designers Society of America's (IDSA) Education Award, in recognition of his "significant and distinguished contributions" in industrial design education.

== Personal life ==
Lepper married Helen Jewett of Pittsburgh on September 6, 1933, in Damariscotta, Maine, where she was born. They lived in Pittsburgh and had a daughter, Susan, born about 1935.

He died February 7, 1991, when he was living in Pittsburgh.

== Posthumous recognition ==
In 2002, The Andy Warhol Museum held the "Robert Lepper, Artist & Teacher" exhibit, which exhibited works from Lepper's estate and Carnegie Mellon. Some were shown for the first time. River Creature is a model of a 60-foot-tall, fire-breathing dragon proposed work of art, to "humorously" reflect Pittsburgh's industrial history. Carnegie established the Robert Lepper Distinguished Lecture series in his honor.

In 1994, Norbert Nathanson and Dale Stein, both former students of Lepper, produced a video documentary An Affectionate Memoir, Robert L. Lepper. The documentary was narrated by Lepper's daughter, Susan Lepper, and may be found in the Lepper Archives, Hunt Library of Carnegie Mellon University, Pittsburgh, PA.
