= Vermilye =

Vermilye is a surname. Notable people with the surname include:

- Claudius Vermilye (1928–2018), American priest and child pornographer
- Edward Vermilye Huntington (1874–1952), American mathematician
- William Montgomery Vermilye (1801–1878), American banker
- W. R. Vermilye (1810–1876), American banker
