= W. R. Vermilye =

American banker

President of the New York Stock Exchange
- In office 1861–1862
- Preceded by: William H. Neilson
- Succeeded by: Abraham B. Baylis

Personal details
- Born: Washington Romeyn Vermilye; September 29, 1810 New York City, New York, U.S.
- Died: December 23, 1876 (aged 66) Englewood, New Jersey, U.S.
- Party: Republican
- Spouse: Elizabeth Dwight Lathrop (m. 1833; died 1874)
- Relations: William Montgomery Vermilye (brother)
- Children: 6
- Parent(s): William W. Vermilye; Mary Montgomery Vermilye

Military service
- Allegiance: United States of America; Union
- Branch/service: United States Army; Union Army
- Rank: Colonel
- Unit: 7th New York Militia

Col. Washington Romeyn Vermilye (September 29, 1810 – December 23, 1876) was an American banker who served as president of the New York Stock Exchange.

== Early life ==
Vermilye was born in Harlem in New York City on September 29, 1810. He was a son of Mary (née Montgomery) Vermilye (1782–1847), who was of Irish Montgomery lineage, and William W. Vermilye (1780–1849), a venerated elder in the Presbyterian Church. Among his siblings were bankers William Montgomery Vermilye and Jacob Dykeman Vermilye (husband of Mary Cornelia Lathrop), and prominent clergyman, the Rev. Drs. Thomas E. Vermilye and Robert G. Vermilye.

Vermilye, who was of Huguenot ancestry, was "a descendant of one of the oldest families of New-York, the original founder of the family, Mr. John Vermilye, having immigrated to this country from England in 1690."

== Career ==
On November 8, 1830, Vermilye began his association with the Seventh Regiment (formerly the 27th Artillery) of the National Guard. In 1832, he was elected first lieutenant, followed by captain in 1833, major in 1840, lieutenant colonel in 1843, and lastly, promoted to colonel in November 1845. After years of service in the regiment he continued his interest, being colonel of the veterans, and was actively involved in the building of new armory.

Vermilye was a Republican in politics and was involved as one of the commissioners of the New York Public School System. In 1863, W.R. and his brother William declined, along with President Abraham Lincoln, Robert B. Roosevelt, John J. Astor Jr. and Nathaniel Sands, to endorse John Adams Dix for mayor of New York City. In 1873, he wrote to President Ulysses S. Grant regarding the suspension of General Thomas B. Van Buren from his position as U.S. Commissioner to the Vienna Exhibition.

=== Banking career ===
In 1849, along with his eldest brother William Montgomery Vermilye and George Carpenter, he founded the firm of Carpenter & Vermilye, which became one of the most prominent banking houses in New York City and was known for selling war bonds during the U.S. Civil War. After Carpenter's retirement in 1858, the firm was renamed Vermilye & Co. His brother retired in 1868. (Note: In 1905, Carpenter & Vermilye was renamed after its principal partner, William A. Read. In 1921, the firm was again renamed as Dillon, Read & Co. to include partner Clarence Dillon. In 1991, it was acquired by Barings Bank and, in 1997, it was acquired by Swiss Bank Corporation, which was in turn acquired by UBS in 1998.) After his death, his son took over his interest in W.R. Vermilye & Co.

A member of the New York Stock Exchange and its board of governors, he served as president of the Exchange from 1861 to 1862 during the Civil War.

== Personal life ==
On October 2, 1833, Vermilye was married to Elizabeth Dwight Lathrop (1812–1874) in West Springfield, Massachusetts. Elizabeth was a daughter of Mary (née McCrackan) Lathrop and U.S. Representative Samuel Lathrop. Elizabeth's sister, Mary Lathrop, was married to Rev. William Buell Sprague and both were granddaughters of the Rev. Joseph Lathrop, one of the most distinguished clergymen the country. Together, W.R. and Elizabeth were the parents of six children, including:

- Mary Elizabeth Vermilye (1834–1836), who died young.
- Washington Romeyn Vermilye Jr. (1837–1909), a banker and civil engineer who married Hattie Amelye Comstock in 1861.
- Samuel Lathrop Vermilye (b. 1839), who died young.
- George Smith Vermilye (b. 1841), who died young.
- Emily Augusta Vermilye (1846–1921), who married Elbert Adrain Brinckerhoff, president of Merchants' National Bank and a Mayor of Englewood.
- Arthur Montgomery Vermilye (1849–1853), who died young.

He was a member of the board of managers of the American Bible Society, the Presbyterian Board of Foreign Missions, and a director of the Lenox Hospital, among other benevolent associations.

In 1868, after living in New York City for most of his life, he moved to Englewood, New Jersey. He died unexpectedly, after a short and painful illness, at his home in Englewood on December 23, 1876. He was buried at Woodlawn Cemetery, Bronx alongside his wife, who had died in St. Augustine, Florida on April 11, 1874. Woodlawn was near Kingsbridge, where the Vermilye family had an extensive farm and mansion since the early settlement of New York. In his will, he left significant funds to charities and created trusts for the benefit of his siblings and their children. He also set aside $200,000 "for the continuation of the banking business of Vermilye & Co., on Nassau street." His son, who became a special partner in the banking house, inherited his house and grounds in Englewood, and the remainder of his property, valued at $1,000,000, was to be equally divided between his surviving son and daughter.
