= Gay Neck, the Story of a Pigeon =

1927 children's novel by Dhan Gopal Mukerji

Gay-Neck, the Story of a Pigeon
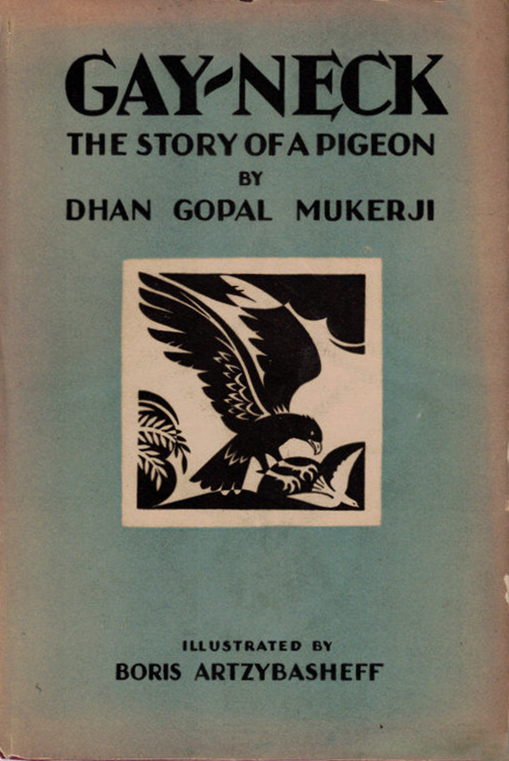
- Author: Dhan Gopal Mukerji
- Illustrator: Boris Artzybasheff
- Language: English
- Genre: Children's novel
- Publisher: E. P. Dutton
- Publication date: 1927
- Publication place: United States
- Media type: Print (hardback and paperback)
- Pages: 191 pp

Gay-Neck, the Story of a Pigeon is a 1927 children's novel by Dhan Gopal Mukerji that won the Newbery Medal for excellence in American children's literature in 1928. It deals with the life of Gay-Neck, a prized Indian pigeon. Mukerji wrote that "the message implicit in the book is that man and winged animals are brothers." He stated that much of the book is based on his boyhood experiences with a flock of forty pigeons and their leader, as the boy in the book is Mukerji himself. He did have to draw from the experiences of others for some parts of the book, such as those who trained messenger pigeons in the war. The book offers an insight into the life of a boy of high caste during the early 1900s and also into the training of pigeons. Several chapters are told from Gay-Neck's perspective, with the pigeon speaking in first person. Elizabeth Seeger writes in a biographical note about Mukerji that, "Gay-Neck was written in Brittany, where every afternoon he read to the children gathered about him on the beach the chapter he had written in the morning." In an article in the children's literature journal The Lion and the Unicorn, Meena G. Khorana calls the novel one of the few children's novels from Western or Indian authors to explore the Himalayas in a meaningful way (rather than simply using them as a setting), and notes the way Mukerji recalls their "grandeur and spiritual power".

== Plot ==
Gay-Neck, or Chitra-Griva, is born to a young owner in India. Gay-Neck's parents teach him how to fly, but he soon loses his father in a storm and his mother to a hawk. His master and Ghond the hunter take him out into the wilderness, but he becomes so scared by the hawks that he flees and ends up in a lamasery where the Buddhist monks are able to cure him of his fear. When his young master returns home he finds Gay-Neck waiting for him. But Gay-Neck decides to go on other long journeys, much to the boy's consternation. Then, during World War I, Gay-Neck and Ghond end up journeying to Europe where Gay-Neck serves as a messenger pigeon. He is chased by German machine-eagles (planes) and is severely traumatized when one of his fellow messenger pigeons is shot down. Gay-Neck and Ghond barely survive, and Gay-Neck is unable to fly. Ghond, Gay-Neck, and his master return to the lamasery near Singalila, where Ghond and Gay-Neck need to be cleansed of the hate and fear of the war. After that, Ghond succeeds in hunting down a buffalo that killed a villager, but feels remorse for having to kill the buffalo. Gay-Neck disappears once more, but when the other two return home, they find, to their joy, that Gay-Neck had already flown there ahead of them.

Awards
Preceded by Smoky the Cowhorse	Newbery Medal recipient 1928	Succeeded by The Trumpeter of Krakow
