= Society of Patriarchs =

Gentlemen's club

Society of Patriarchs was a society founded in 1872 in New York City by Ward McAllister that are known for hosting the Patriarch Balls, the "epitome of conspicuous display and upper-class ritual and etiquette" during the Gilded Age.

== History ==
Ward McAllister, the self-appointed arbiter who is best known today for revealing the names of New York society's The Four Hundred to The New York Times in 1892, and three others, including Robert George Remsen, founded the "Society of Patriarchs" in 1872 and served as its president until his death in 1895. According to McAllister:

"The object we had in view was to make these balls thoroughly representative; to embrace the old colonial New-Yorkers, our adopted citizens, and men whose ability and integrity had worn the esteem of the community, who formed an important element in society. We wanted the money power, but not in any way to be controlled by it. Patriarchs were chosen solely for their fitness, on each of them promising to invite to each ball only such people as would do credit to the ball."

The Society was initially a group of 25 gentlemen from New York Society who funded the balls. The group of 25 were "representative men of worth, respectability, and responsibility," and included William Collins Whitney (the Secretary of the Navy under President Grover Cleveland) and James Powell Kernochan, William Watts Sherman, and George G. Haven.

In the 1880s, the list was increased from twenty-five to fifty, at which time Charles Lanier, August Belmont, Buchanan Winthrop, William R. Travers, Cornelius Vanderbilt II and J. Pierpont Morgan became members.

The Society, which lasted for approximately twenty-five years, was disbanded on April 9, 1897, two years after McAllister's death, reportedly due to a lack of interest. The increase in the number of private ballrooms and desire for less structured entertainment led many of the younger generation to resist the Patriarchs and their balls, which came to be known as the "Dowager's balls."

=== Patriarch's Ball ===
Beginning with the winter 1885-1886 social season in New York, the Patriarchs began throwing a ball each year, known as the Patriarchs Ball, which was modeled on the Almack's Ball of the British aristocracy. Each member of the Society was entitled to invite nine people, four ladies and five gentlemen, to the ball, thereby making invitations difficult to obtain and subsequently establishing the invitees as deemed fit for society.

The first Patriarchs Ball was held on December 13, 1881, at Delmonico's, with 375 guests and Col. DeLancey Astor Kane led the first cotillion. The Ball received significant press coverage, as did all subsequent balls.

The Ball generally started late in the evening, around ten o'clock, and after guests arrived, they were divided by sex to separate dressing rooms before entering the ballroom for dancing until dinner was served, after midnight, which was usually French cuisine.

International guests, generally European aristocrats, were often invited to the Balls. In 1890, the Duke and Duchess of Marlborough, the Hon. Henry G. Edwardes (a British diplomat), Count Arco Valley, Baron Jean Rarignon, the Viscomte de Richmont, the Marquise de Talleyrand-Périgord, Baron Speck von Sternburg, and the Marquise de Choiseul, among others.

=== Legacy ===
The Patriarchs Ball inspired similar balls, including the Assembly Ball (thrown by fifty prominent society women who were largely the wives of the fifty Patriarchs) and the Ihpetonga Ball, which was considered "the most important social event of the season in Brooklyn."
