= Boris Chaliapin =

Russian artist (1904–1979)

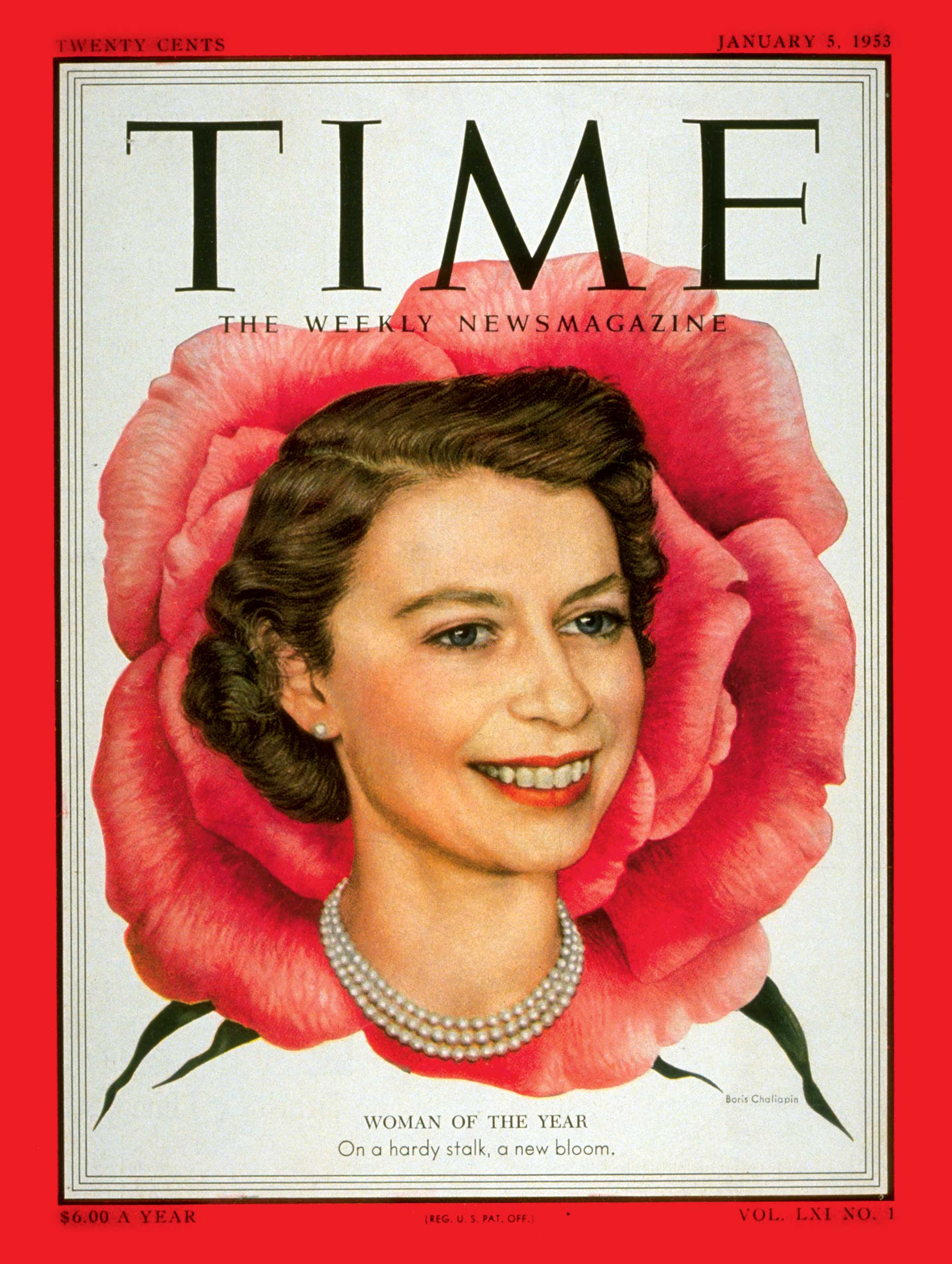
Chaliapin's Time cover, showing Queen Elizabeth II on January 5, 1953

Boris Chaliapin (Russian: Борис Фёдорович Шаля́пин; September 22, 1904 – May 18, 1979) was an artist for Time magazine, for which he illustrated more than 400 covers, from 1942 (Jawaharlal Nehru) to 1970 (Richard Nixon).

== Background ==
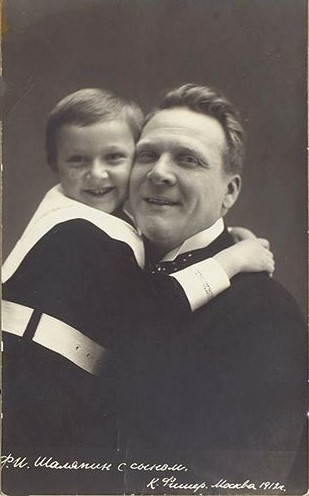
Boris Chaliapin as child with his father Feodor Chaliapin (1912)

Boris Chaliapin was born on September 22, 1904. His father was Russian opera singer Feodor Chaliapin and mother Iola Chaliapin-Tornagi. He was the third of six children; one sibling was The Name of the Rose film star Feodor Chaliapin, Jr. He spent his childhood in Moscow. In 1919 he studied in Petrograd in the academic workshop of V.I. Shukhaev, in 1920–1923 - in Moscow in the 1st and 2nd GSHM with D.N. Kardovsky, A.E. Arkhipova and F.I. Zakharov, in 1923-1925 - at the sculptural faculty of the VHUTEMAS and in the workshop of S. T. Konenkov at Krasnaya Presnya. In 1923, Chaliapin spent about three months in Paris and then returned in the summer of 1925 to Paris and stayed. His father bought a workshop for him in Montmartre. He continued his studies at the F. Kolarossi Academy under S. Guerin, in the workshops of K. A. Korovin and P. K. Stepanov.

== Career ==
In 1927, during the tour of F.I. Chaliapin in London's Covent Garden, he opened the first exhibition of ten works in the lobby of the theater: a portrait of Lydia's sister, drawings on Russian themes: In the Tea Room, Gypsies at the Fair, Merchant, Stepan Razin, Pugachev, etc. In the future, his exhibitions in theaters and concert halls often accompanied father's performances around the world. Participated in exhibitions of Russian art in the Paris galleries d'Alignan (1931), La Renaissance (1932), the Yteb hall (1935), in Boulogne-Billancourt (1935) and in Prague (1935).

Chaliapin was a cover artist at Time for some three decades. He belongs to a group of illustrators during the golden age of Time covers, including Boris Artzybasheff, Robert Vickrey, James Ormsbee Chapin and Bernard Safran.

== Death ==
Chaliapin is interred at Ferncliff Cemetery and Mausoleum, Hartsdale, Westchester County, New York.

== Exhibitions ==
Solo:

- 2013 "Mr Time", National Portrait Gallery, Washington, D.C.
