= Vera Bock =

American artist (1905–2006)

- Born: 4 April 1905; Saint Petersburg, Russian Empire
- Died: 2006; Zurich, Switzerland
- Occupation: Artist
- Known for: Book illustrations

Vera Bock (4 April 1905 – 2006) was a Russian-born artist who spent most of her career in the United States. She is known for her book illustrations and for the posters she made for the Works Progress Administration during the Great Depression.

== Life ==
Vera Bock was born in Saint Petersburg, Russian Empire, on 4 April 1905. Her father was an American banker and her mother was a Russian concert pianist. During the Russian Revolution her family fled to the United States by way of Siberia, China and Japan. They reached San Francisco in 1917.

Bock later studied in Switzerland and England. She was trained in painting and drawing, and spent a year in England studying woodcutting, manuscript illumination, printing and photogravure.

Bock may be best known for her children’s book illustrations. Her first book illustrations were published in 1929 in Waldemar Bonsels’s The Adventures of Maya the Bee and Ella Young's The Tangle-Coated Horse and Other Tales. The latter book was reviewed for the Newbery Medal in 1930, and was retroactively given Honor Book status in 1938. The Kerlan Collection of Children's Literature at the University of Minnesota holds many of Bock's illustrations.

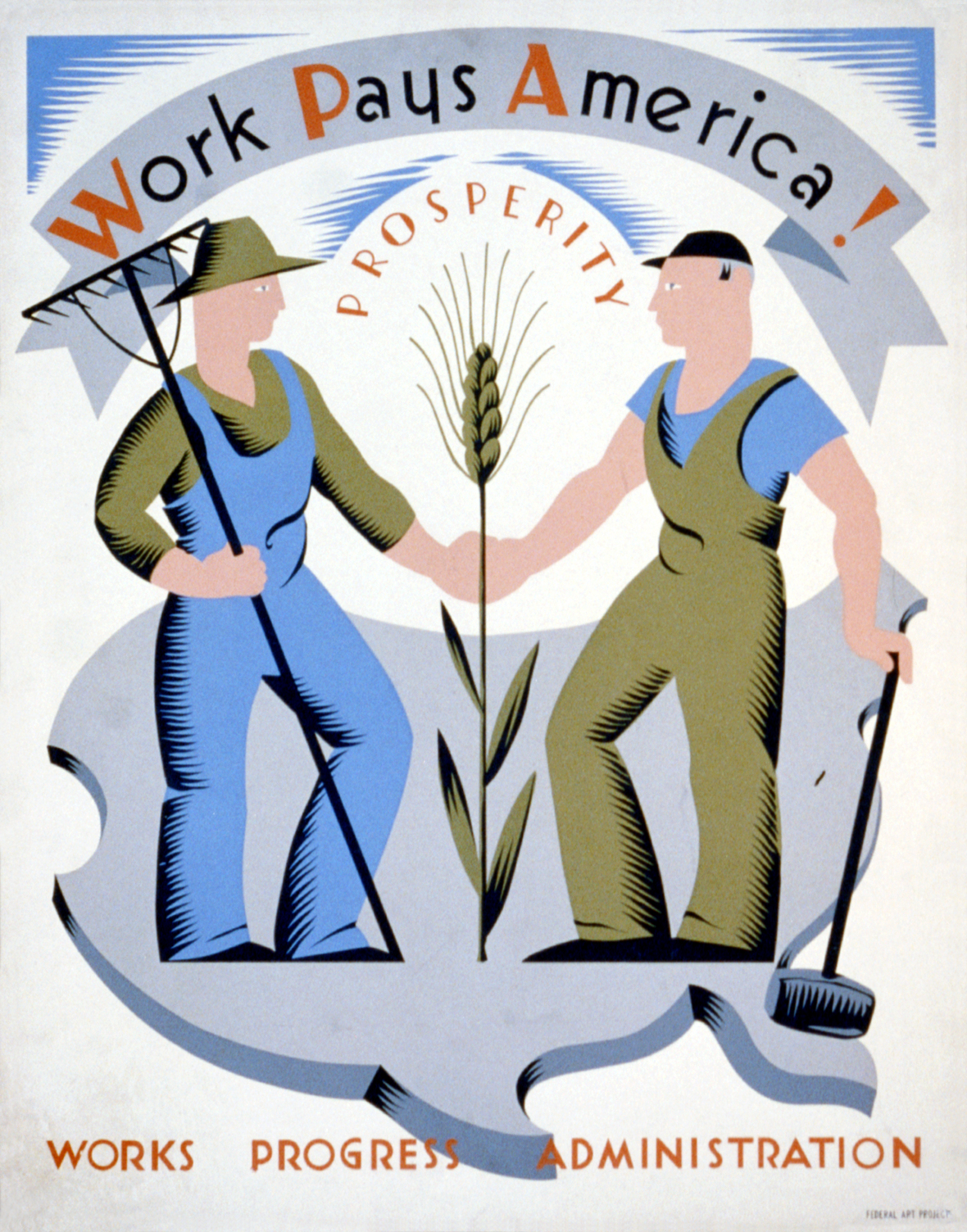
Poster by Vera Bock for the Works Progress Administration

Bock designed posters for the Federal Art Project of the Works Progress Administration during the Great Depression. She worked for the New York City poster division from 1936 to 1939. Bock's bold Art Deco posters advertised art exhibitions and theater performances, and encouraged activities like travel, exercise, community events, educational programs, writing letters, and saving trees. Her silkscreen posters have a distinctive appearance similar to woodblocks, dominated by strong solid forms that often show a Germanic influence. She made a series of posters, History of Civic Services, which are reminiscent of the forms she often used in children's books.

During the 1940s Bock worked as an illustrator for Life and Coronet. Her work was shown in exhibitions at the New York Public Library (1942), Art Directors Club of New York (1946), Pierpont Morgan Library (International Exhibition of Illustrated Books, 1946), and New York Public Library (Ten Years of American Illustration, 1951).

Bock retired to Lincolnville, Maine. She married George Kaestlin late in her life and moved to Switzerland. While living there, she worked with a non-profit restoring damaged buildings in Florence, Italy. Bock retired to Zurich, Switzerland. Vera Bock Kaestlin died in 2006.

== Publications ==
- Ella Young (1929), The Tangle-Coated Horse and Other Tales, Illustrated by Vera Bock
- Waldemar Bonsels (1929), The Adventures of Maya the Bee, Illustrated by Vera Bock
- Oscar Wilde (1935), Oscar Wilde fairy tales, Illustrated by Vera Bock, Mount Vernon, NY: Peter Pauper Press
- Katharine Gibson (1936), The Oak Tree House, Illustrated by Vera Bock
- Selskar Gunn (1937), The Doings of Dinkie (A children's tale), Illustrated by Vera Bock
- Little Magic Horse, Illustrated by Vera Bock, 1942
- M. Ilin; E. Segal (1944), A Ring and A Riddle, Illustrated by Vera Bock
- Andrew Lang (1946), Arabian Nights, Illustrated by Vera Bock
- Critical History of Children's Literature, Illustrated by Vera Bock, 1953

== Sources ==
- "A Ring and a Riddle", 50 Watts, September 2010
- Duxbury, Kathleen (Winter 2017), "Reports on New/Old Calendar" (PDF), New Deal, National New Deal Preservation Association
- Marter, Joan M. (2011), "Bock, Vera", The Grove Encyclopedia of American Art, Oxford University Press, ISBN 978-0-19-533579-8
- "Vera Bock", Britannica Kids: Students
- Vera Bock Papers, Minneapolis: Elmer L. Andersen Library
- "WPA Artist Vera Bock, Lincolnville artist, at the Farnsworth", Penobscot Bay Pilot, 11 July 2017
