= Bernard Safran =

American painter (1924–1995)

- Self portrait, 1974
- Born: June 3, 1924; New York City, United States
- Died: October 14, 1995 (aged 71); Moncton, New Brunswick, Canada
- Occupation: Painter
- Known for: Time magazine cover portraits

Bernard Safran (June 3, 1924 – October 14, 1995) was an American painter known for his realistic portraits and scenes of everyday life in New York and in rural Canada. He created many portraits for Time magazine covers, with subjects that included Elizabeth II, Pope John XXIII, Dwight D. Eisenhower, John F. Kennedy, Lyndon B. Johnson and Richard Nixon.

== Career ==
=== Early years ===
Safran was born in 1924 in New York City. His parents were emigrants from Russia. At an early age Safran showed artistic abilities. He studied at the High School of Music & Art in New York, and later at the Pratt Institute. During World War II (1939–45) Safran joined the United States Army Corps of Engineers and served in China, Burma and India.

=== Illustrator ===
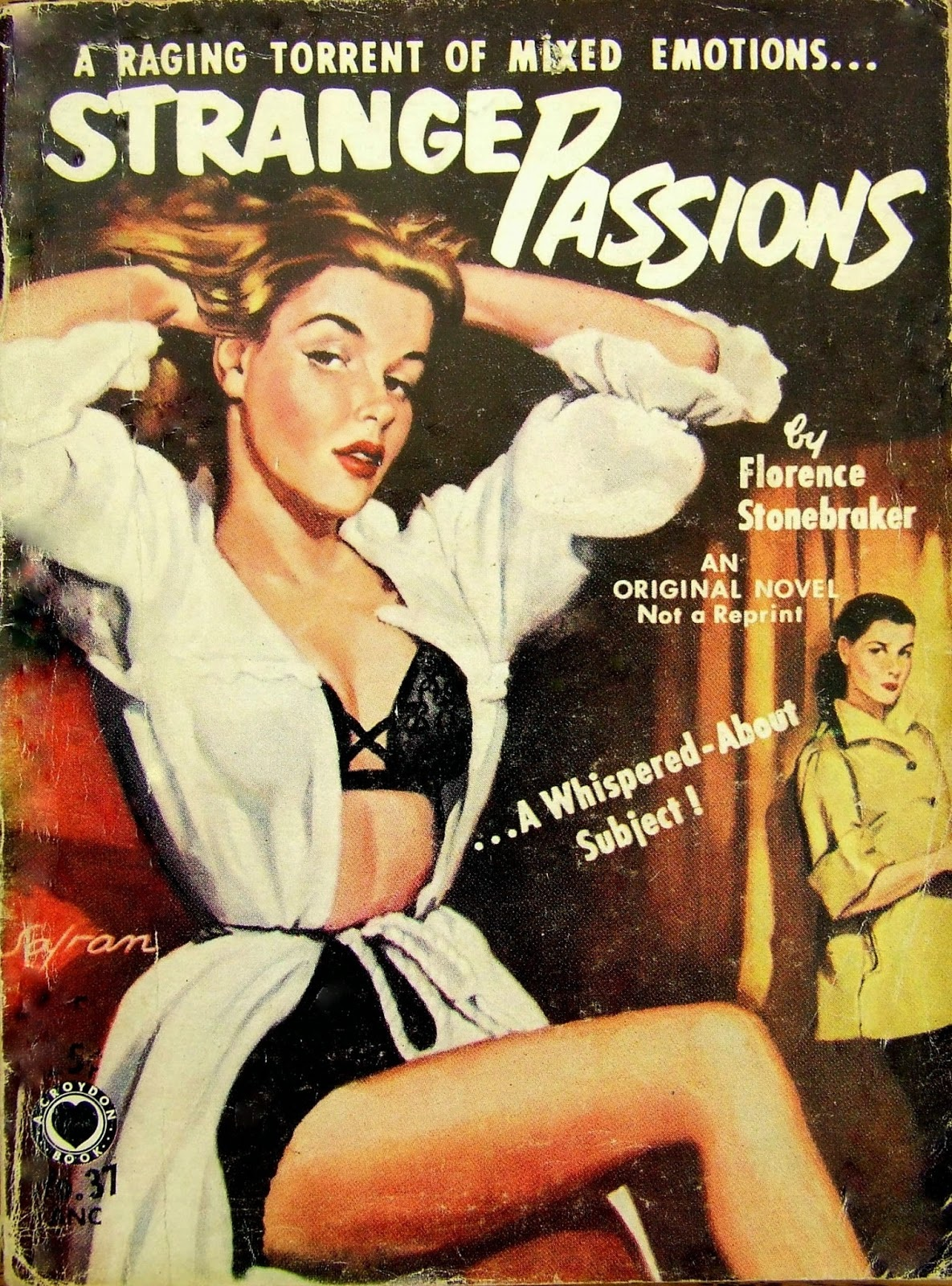
1953 paperback novel cover

After the war, in 1946 Safran start to work as a freelance book jacket illustrator for western and mystery novels. A sample title is Nightclub Sinner by Harry Whittington (New York, 1954). Wayward Girl, A Shocking Expose of Youth Gone Wild by Doug Duperroult (1954) is another example. He also illustrated magazine articles, such as Stand by for Danger in the April 1954 issue of Boys' Life, one of many stories he illustrated for that magazine. The work paid reasonably well, but he became dissatisfied with it and decided to become a serious artist. He spent six months in the mid-1950s studying and copying work at the Metropolitan Museum of Art by old masters such as Peter Paul Rubens, Diego Velázquez and Rembrandt.

Safran worked as an illustrator for Time from 1957 to 1966. Other illustrators of Time covers during this period, which has been called the golden age of Time covers, included Boris Artzybasheff, Robert Vickrey, James Ormsbee Chapin and Boris Chaliapin. Safran's covers included works such as Kenya's Tom Mboya, in which he showed a dreamy-eyed Mboya dressed in coat and tie in front of a white settler on one side and a native African on the other, with Mount Kenya in the background. His illustration of President Eisenhower shows Eisenhower in front of a diagram depicting ties between Washington, London, Paris and Bonn, representing the military–industrial complex. He depicted Cuba's Che Guevara for the August 8, 1960, edition and [Pope] John XXIII for the January 4, 1963, edition.

=== Fine artist ===
After he had left Time Magazine, Saffran spent almost twenty years painting over forty genre scenes of everyday life in Manhattan, typically portraying the strength of ordinary people living in decaying urban settings. His subjects included the poor, prostitutes, working people and old people. He also took many casual photographs of public life in the city.

In 1964 Safran made a painting of Medea, a modern interpretation of the tragic Greek infanticide from the play of that name by Euripides. A well-dressed middle-class housewife stares at the viewer, with one arm around each of her two sons. The boys gaze up at their mother. The powerful painting conveys a sense of sadness and menace through Medea's expression alone, with no obvious clues such as a weapon. The model for the mother was a close friend of the family, and the boys were neighborhood children. The painting was first shown at the Fitzgerald Gallery in New York City in 1966, part of a show of works by Safran on themes from mythology and the Bible.

In 1973 Safran moved with his family to a farmhouse outside of Sackville, New Brunswick, Canada. For the next 20 years he created paintings of working life in rural Canada. Safran died of a heart attack on October 14, 1995, at his home in Moncton, New Brunswick, Canada. He was survived by his wife, Adele, two daughters and four grandchildren.

== Works ==
Safran's work was exhibited in New York and Washington galleries.

=== Time magazine covers ===
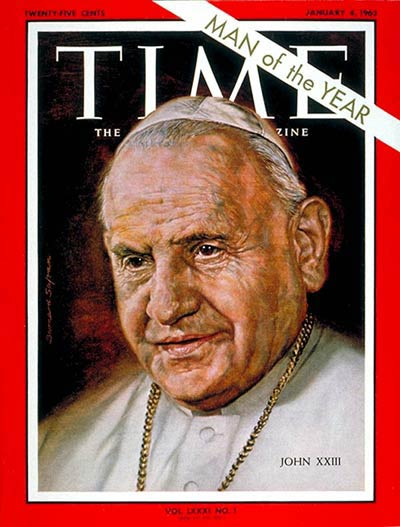
Pope John XXIII (January 4, 1963)

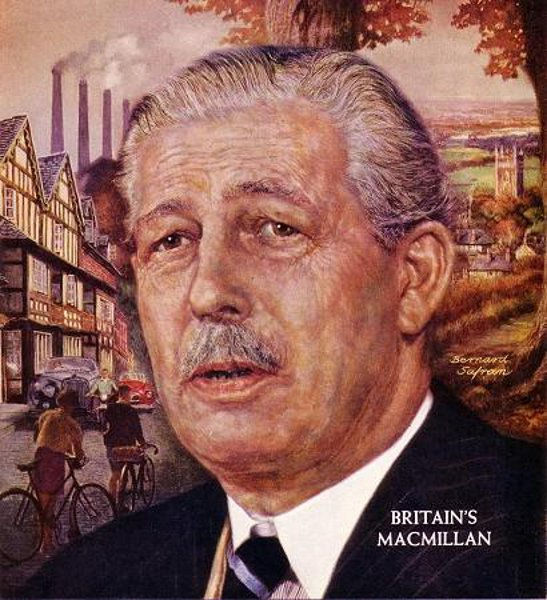
Harold Macmillan (1959)

Portraits that were published as Time magazine covers included:

- Charles DeGaulle (July 1, 1966)
- Fidel Castro (October 8, 1965)
- Henry Fowler (September 10, 1965)
- Norton Simon (June 4, 1965)
- Fernando Belaunde Terry of Peru (March 12, 1965)
- Evsei Liberman of the USSR (February 12, 1965)
- Jack Straus (January 8, 1965)
- "Buddhism" (December 11, 1964)
- Harold Wilson (B&W only) (October 23, 1964)
- Anne-Marie, Princess of Denmark (July 3, 1964)
- Barry Goldwater (June 12, 1964)
- Lee Iacocca (April 17, 1964)
- Julius Nyerere of Tanzania (March 13, 1964)
- Governor John Connally (January 17, 1964)
- Archaeologist Nelson Glueck (December 13, 1963)
- Lyndon Johnson (November 29, 1963)
- Archbishop of Canterbury (August 16, 1963)
- Conrad Hilton (July 19, 1963)
- Bobby Kennedy (June 21, 1963)
- Richard Burton, Actor (April 26, 1963)
- Pope John XXIII (January 4, 1963)
- Everett Dirksen, Senator (September 14, 1962)
- Harry Byrd, Senator (August 17, 1962)
- Blas Roca of Cuba (April 27, 1962)
- Tennessee Williams (March 9, 1962)
- Visser 't Hooft (December 8, 1961)
- John Enders, Virologist (November 17, 1961)
- Jean Monnet (October 6, 1961)
- Donald Russell (August 11, 1961)
- Leonard Larson, A.M.A. President (July 7, 1961)
- Clint & John Murchison (June 16, 1961)
- Cuban Rebel Leader Jose Cardona (April 28, 1961)
- Savang Vatthana, King of Laos (March 17, 1961)
- Ancel Keyes, Physiologist (January 13, 1961)
- Franz Joseph Strauss of Germany (December 19, 1960)
- Richard Nixon (October 31, 1960)
- Henry Cabot Lodge (September 26, 1960)
- The Shah of Iran (September 12, 1960)
- Dag Hammarskjold (background only) (August 22, 1960)
- Che Guevara of Cuba (August 8, 1960)
- The Kennedys (July 11, 1960)
- Caryl Chessman on Death Row (March 21, 1960)
- Tom Mboya of Kenya (March 7, 1960)
- Dwight Eisenhower (January 4, 1960)
- Harold MacMillan of Great Britain (October 19, 1959)
- Nikita Khrushchev (September 28, 1959)
- Queen Elizabeth II (June 29, 1959)
- Abdul Kassem of Iraq (April 13, 1959)
- House Leaders (February 2, 1959)
- Mao Tse-Tung (December 1, 1958)
- Amos Alonzo Stagg, Football Coach (October 20, 1958)
- Jack Paar (August 18, 1958)
- Munoz Marin of Puerto Rico (June 23, 1958)
- "Beauty" (June 16, 1958)
- Achmad Sukarno of Indonesia (March 10, 1958)
- Adnan Menderes of Turkey (February 3, 1958)
- Ludwig Erhard of Germany (October 28, 1957)
- Mohammed V of Morocco (April 22, 1957)

=== Unpublished Time covers ===
Unpublished portraits for Time magazine covers included:

- King Hussein of Jordan
- The Aga Khan
- Adam Clayton Powell
- Hendrik Verwoerd of South Africa
- Patrice Lumumba of the Congo
- Adolf Eichmann
- Ferhat Abbas of Algeria
- Sarit Thanarat of Thailand
- Ahmed Ben Bella of Algeria
- Sir Alec Douglas-Home of Great Britain
- Deng Xiaoping (Teng Hsiao-p'ing)
- Muhammed Ayub Khan of Pakistan
- Maurice Duplessis of Canada
- Luthor Hodges
- Sir Frank Packer of Australia

== Sources ==
- "Bernard Safran", askART
- "Bernard Safran, Artist, 71", New York Times, October 17, 1995
- Editors of TIME Magazine (15 October 2013), Inside the Red Border: A History of Our World Told Through the Pages of TIME, Time Home Entertainment, ISBN 978-1-61893-909-8
- Kasten, Len (16 February 2017), Alien World Order: The Reptilian Plan to Divide and Conquer the Human Race, Inner Traditions / Bear & Co, ISBN 978-1-59143-240-1
- Lauriola, Rosanna (17 September 2015), "The 'Fatal' Power of Love: Medea", Brill's Companion to the Reception of Euripides, BRILL, ISBN 978-90-04-29981-8
- Lovisi, Gary (16 July 2009), Dames, Dolls and Delinquents: A Collector's Guide to Sexy Pulp Fiction Paperbacks, Krause Publications, ISBN 978-0-89689-968-1
- Malyon, Elizabeth, "Bernard Safran", Safran-arts
- Maraniss, David (19 June 2012), Barack Obama: The Story, Simon and Schuster, ISBN 978-1-4391-6753-3
- "Medea", Safran Arts
- Mygatt, E.D. (April 1954), "Stand by for Danger", Boys' Life, Boy Scouts of America, Inc., ISSN 0006-8608
- Stephens, C. P. (1992), A Checklist of Harry Whittington, Ultramarine Publishing, ISBN 978-0-89366-235-6
- Waters, Charles H. Jr. (November 1991), "Anatomy of a Cover", Annual Review of Jazz Studies 5, 1991, Scarecrow Press, ISBN 978-0-8108-2478-2
