= Robert George Remsen =

American physician and clubman

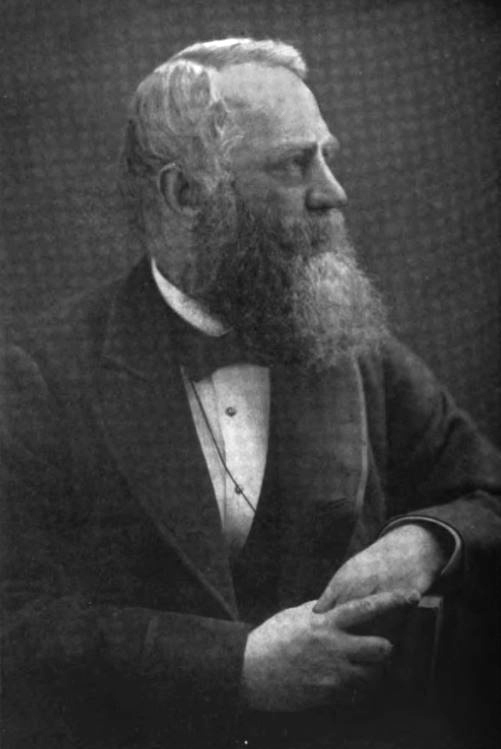

23rd President of the Saint Nicholas Society of the City of New York
- In office 1879–1879
- Preceded by: William Montgomery Vermilye
- Succeeded by: Edward Floyd DeLancey

Personal details
- Born: March 21, 1821 Manhattan, New York, U.S.
- Died: January 18, 1896 (aged 74) Manhattan, New York, U.S.
- Spouse: Margaret Delprat (m. 1856)
- Relations: Anna Remsen Webb (niece)
- Children: 4
- Parent(s): Henry Remsen; Eliza de Peyster Remsen
- Education: Princeton University; Columbia University College of Physicians and Surgeons

Robert George Remsen (March 25, 1821 – January 18, 1896) was an American physician who was prominent in New York society.

== Early life ==
Remsen was born on March 25, 1821, at the old Remsen homestead on Cherry Hill, near Catherine Street, in Manhattan. He was the son of Hendrick "Henry" Remsen III (1762–1843), the former private secretary of Thomas Jefferson, and Elizabeth "Eliza" (née de Peyster) Remsen (1787–1826), who married in 1808. Among his siblings was William Remsen (who married Jane Suydam); Henry Rutgers Remsen (who married Elizabeth Waldron Phoenix); Catharine Ann Remsen; and Elizabeth Remsen.

His maternal grandparents were Catherine (née Bancker) de Peyster and Abraham B. de Peyster, a direct descendant of the 23rd Mayor of New York City Johannes de Peyster. (Note: Remsen's grandfather, Abraham B. de Peyster (1763–1801), was the son of William de Peyster Jr., and Elizabeth (née Brasher) de Peyster. Remsen's great-aunt (Abraham's sister), was Elizabeth de Peyster was the second wife of painter Charles Willson Peale.) His paternal grandparents were Hendrick "Henry" Remsen and Cornelia (née Dickinson) Remsen. His paternal grandfather was the namesake of Remsen, New York, the original proprietor of the township and the inheritor of the Remsenburgh patent, which embraced some 48,000 acres (190 km^{2}) in Oneida and Herkimer counties and was granted in 1766 (later re-granted by the Legislature in 1787) to Remsen and four other New York merchants. Remsen, a New York City merchant and owner of Henry Remsen Jr. & Co., was the descendant of some of the earliest Dutch settlers of New Amsterdam, and was a member of the Committee of One Hundred and represented the city in the Provincial Congress from 1776 to 1777. Remsen descended from the early Dutch family for whom Remsen Street in Brooklyn was named.

Through his older brother, Henry Rutgers Remsen, he was an uncle of Anna Remsen Webb, the wife of Union Army General Alexander S. Webb; and through his brother William Remsen, he was an uncle of Charles Remsen, the husband of Lillian Livingston Jones.

Remsen graduated from Princeton University, with an A.B. degree in 1842 and an A.M. degree in 1845. He later graduated from the Columbia University College of Physicians and Surgeons with a M.D. degree in 1845.

== Career ==
While Remsen was educated as a physician, he did not practice during his later years, instead, "preferring the leisure which ample means gave him for more congenial pursuits in the direction of large corporations, in club association and free intercourse with a large circle of friends."

In business, Remsen was a director, and former vice-president, of the Manhattan Savings Institution, a director of the Knickerbocker Trust Company, the Union Trust company and the Third Avenue Railroad.

=== Society life ===
Remsen served as a governor of the Union Club, a member of the New York Yacht Club and the South Side Sportsmen's Club. Remsen, along with Ward McAllister, was one of four founders of the Patriarchs in 1872, serving as president and credited as the originator of their ball. At the time of his death, he was the last surviving founder.

On May 5, 1877, at age forty-six, he was elected to the Century Association in New York. In 1879, he became the 23rd President of the Saint Nicholas Society of the City of New York, a charitable organization in New York City of men who are descended from early inhabitants of the State of New York. He was elected to the Society on September 12, 1848, and later elected a Steward in 1865.

== Personal life ==
Around 1856, Remsen was married to Margaret Delprat (d. 1920), the daughter of Sophia (née Steuart) Delprat and John Charles Delprat. Together, Margaret and Robert were the parents of four daughters:

- Margaret Sophia "Maizie" Remsen (d. 1946), who did not marry.
- Georgiana Delprat Remsen (1859–1933), who married Charles Betts Hillhouse (1856–1937).
- Frances "Fannie" Remsen (d. 1934), who married Winfield Hoyt Scott, a grandson of Gen. Winfield Scott, in 1897.
- Caroline Remsen (1867–1934), who married Robert Albert McKim, nephew of architect Charles Follen McKim, at Grace Church in March 1889.

After an illness of several days from erysipelas, Remsen died at his home, 87 Fifth Avenue in Manhattan, on January 18, 1896. He was buried in the family vault at Green Wood Cemetery in Brooklyn, and in his will, he funded the Remsen Graduate Scholarship at New York University, and donated $10,000 for the construction of a church near his country home along the shore. After his death, his widow moved uptown to 3 East 80th Street.

=== Descendants ===
Through his daughter Caroline, he was the grandfather of Robert Remsen McKim (d. 1938), who married Helen Stagg in 1920; Katherine McKim, who married Frank C. L. Dettman; Caroline Remsen McKim (1903–1936), who married Claude Claire Vickrey, who courted Wallis Warfield (who was better known later in life as the Duchess of Windsor) at his graduating ball from the U.S. Naval Academy, and were the parents of painter Robert Remsen Vickrey (1926–2011). Caroline and Claude later divorced and she remarried to Caleb van Heusen Whitbeck III, in 1929.
