= Boris Artzybasheff =

Russian and American artist (1899–1965)

Boris Mikhailovich Artzybasheff
- Борис Михайлович Арцыбашев
- Born: 25 May 1899; Kharkov, Kharkov Governorate, Russian Empire
- Died: 16 July 1965 (aged 66); Lyme, Connecticut, United States
- Occupation: Illustrator

Boris Mikhailovich Artzybasheff (Russian: Бори́с Миха́йлович Арцыба́шев, 25 May 1899; Kharkov, Kharkov Governorate, Russian Empire – 16 July 1965) was a Russian and American illustrator notable for his strongly worked and often surreal designs.

== Life and career ==
Artzybasheff was born in Kharkov, son of the author Mikhail Artsybashev. He is said to have fought as a White Russian. During 1919 he arrived in New York City, where he worked in an engraving shop.

His earliest work appeared in 1922 as illustrations for Verotchka's Tales and The Undertaker's Garland. A number of other book illustrations followed during the 1920s. Dhan Gopal Mukerji's Gay Neck, the Story of a Pigeon, with his illustrations, was awarded the Newbery Medal in 1928. His book Seven Simeons was a Caldecott Honor Book in 1938. Over the course of his career, he illustrated some 50 books, several of which he wrote, most notably As I See.

During his lifetime, however, Artzybasheff was probably known best for his magazine art. He illustrated the major American magazines Life, Fortune, and Time.) He painted 219 Time covers from 1942 to 1966, including portraits of Dmitri Shostakovich (20 July 1942), Louis Armstrong (21 February 1949) and Dave Brubeck (8 November 1954). Other illustrators of Time covers during this period, which has been called the golden age of Time covers, included Robert Vickrey, James Ormsbee Chapin, Bernard Safran and Boris Chaliapin.

During World War II, he also served an expert advisor to the U.S. Department of State, Psychological Warfare Branch.

After 1940, he devoted himself to commercial art, including advertisements for Xerox, Shell Oil, Pan Am, Casco Power Tools, Alcoa Steamship lines, Parke-Davis, Avco Manufacturing, Scotch Tape, Wickwire Spencer Steel Company, Vultee Aircraft, World Airways, and Parker Pens.

His graphic style is striking. In commercial work he explored grotesque experiments in anthropomorphism, where toiling machines displayed distinctly human attributes. Conversely, his portrait of Buckminster Fuller's head in the form of his geodesic dome was featured on the cover of the 10 January 1964 issue of TIME magazine and a 37-cent American commemorative stamp issued on 12 July 2004. In his personal work, he explored the depiction of vivid and extreme ranges of human psychology and emotion.

His papers are collected at Syracuse University.

== Selected illustrations ==
- Verotchka's Tales, by Dmitry Mamin-Sibiryak (E. P. Dutton, 1922), OCLC 1544259 — Illustrations at Wikimedia
- The Undertaker's Garland, by John Peale Bishop and Edmund Wilson (A. A. Knopf, 1922), OCLC 1416575 — Illustrations at Wikimedia
- Feats on the Fiord, by Harriet Martineau, 1802–1876 (Macmillan Children's Classics, 1924)
- The Wonder Smith and His Son, by Ella Young (1927)
- Gay Neck, the Story of a Pigeon, by Dhan Gopal Mukerji (1927)
- Orpheus: Myths of the World, by Padraic Colum (1930)
- The Coloured Dome, by Francis Stuart (1933)
- Son of the Sword, by Youel B. Mirza (1934), OCLC 28535329
- All Things Are Possible: An Apocryphal Novel, by Lewis Browne, dust jacket (1935)
- The Circus of Dr. Lao, by Charles G. Finney (1935)
- I, the Tiger, by Manuel Komroff, dust jacket (1935)
- Seven Simeons: a Russian Tale, written by Artzybasheff (1937)
- Nansen, by Anne Gertrude Hall (1940)
- Land of Unreason, by Fletcher Pratt and L. Sprague de Camp (1942)
- The Tree of Life: Selections from the Literature of the World's Religions, by Ruth Smith (1942)
- The Little Sister, by Raymond Chandler, dust jacket (1949)
- The Simple Art of Murder, by Raymond Chandler, dust jacket (1950)

As the illustrator of Seven Simeons, which he also wrote, Artzybasheff was one of two runners-up for the Caldecott Medal in 1938, when the American Library Association inaugurated its award for children's picture books. Mukerji won the 1928 Newbery Medal for Gay Neck; Young and Hall were among the runners-up for that annual ALA award, which recognizes the "most distinguished contribution to children's literature". Finney won one of the inaugural, 1935 National Book Awards for The Circus of Dr. Lao.
