= Ella Young =

Irish-American writer

- Photo portrait, 1930
- Born: 26 December 1867; Fenagh, County Antrim, Ireland
- Died: 23 July 1956 (aged 88); Oceano, California, U.S.
- Education: Royal University of Ireland; Trinity College Dublin
- Occupations: Poet; folklorist; teacher
- Writing career
- Period: Modernist
- Subject: Celtic mythology
- Notable works: Celtic Wonder-Tales: The Wonder-Smith and His Son; The Tangle-Coated Horse
- Movement: Irish Literary Revival

Ella Young (26 December 1867 – 23 July 1956) was an Irish poet and Celtic mythologist active in the Gaelic and Celtic Revival literary movement of the late 19th and early 20th century. Born in Ireland, Young was an author of poetry and children's books. She emigrated from Ireland to the United States in 1925 as a temporary visitor and lived in California. For five years she gave speaking tours on Celtic mythology at American universities, and in 1931 she was involved in a publicized immigration controversy when she attempted to become a citizen.

Young held a chair in Irish Myth and Lore at the University of California, Berkeley for seven years. At Berkeley she was known for her colorful and lively persona, giving lectures while wearing the purple robes of a Druid, expounding on legendary creatures such as fairies and elves, and praising the benefits of talking to trees. Her encyclopedic knowledge and enthusiasm for the subject of Celtic mythology attracted and influenced many of her friends and won her a wide audience among writers and artists in California, including poets Robinson Jeffers and Elsa Gidlow, philosopher Alan Watts, photographer Ansel Adams, and composer Harry Partch, who set several of her poems to music.

Later in life she served as the "godmother" and inspiration for the Dunites, a group of artists living in the dunes of San Luis Obispo County. She retired to the town of Oceano, where she died at the age of 88.

== Early life and work in Ireland ==
Born in Fenagh, Cullybackey, County Antrim, she grew up in Dublin in a Protestant family and attended the Royal University. Contrary to some sources, she is not related to the scholar Rose Maud Young. She later received her master's degree at Trinity College, Dublin. Her interest in Theosophy led her to become an early member of the Hermetic Society, the Dublin branch of the Theosophical Society, where she met writer Kenneth Morris. Her acquaintance with "Æ" (George William Russell) resulted in becoming one of his select group of protégés known as the "singing birds". Russell had been her near neighbour, growing up on Grosvenor Square. Young's nationalist sentiments and her friendship with Patrick Pearse gave her a supporting role in the Easter Rising; as a member of Cumann na mBan, she smuggled rifles and other supplies in support of Republican forces. Young's first volume of verse, titled simply Poems, was published in 1906, and her first work of Irish folklore, The Coming of Lugh, was published in 1909. Her close friend, Irish revolutionary and actor, Maud Gonne illustrated both Lugh and Young's first story collection, Celtic Wonder-Tales (1910). Although she continued to write poetry, she became known best for her telling of traditional Irish legends. She also had a series of fairy experiences, which she recounted in the press.

== Emigration to the United States ==
Young first came to the United States in the 1920s to visit friends, traveling to Connecticut to meet Mary Colum (Molly) and her husband, Irish poet Padraic Colum. Celtic studies scholar William Whittingham Lyman Jr. left the University of California, Berkeley, in 1922 and Young was hired to fill the post in 1924. She immigrated to the United States in 1925; according to Kevin Starr she "had been briefly detained at Ellis Island as a probable mental case when the authorities learned that she believed in the existence of fairies, elves, and pixies". At the time, people suspected to have a mental illness were denied admission to the United States.

While based in California, Young began speaking at various universities in 1925, lecturing first at Columbia University and then at Smith College, Vassar College, and Mills College. According to Norm Hammond,

Wherever she went, she was received enthusiastically, especially by the young people of America. They loved this white-haired lady with the eyes of a seer that appeared to be lighted from within. She spoke with a melodious voice; when she spoke everyone listened. She had a thin, wispy quality that made her appear as the apparition of the very spirits she described. Indeed, her skin had an almost translucent quality.

Young lived in Sausalito in the mid-1920s. She was the James D. Phelan Lecturer in Irish Myth and Lore at the University of California, Berkeley, for approximately a decade.

As of 1931 she had not received legal immigration status; Charles Erskine Scott Wood advised her to go to Victoria, British Columbia, in order to restart the process toward American citizenship. Her application for re-entry to the U.S. was declined for months on the grounds that she might become a "public charge".

In 1926 Ella Young lectured at Carmel-by-the-Sea, California. She was hosted for a fortnight by the famous artist John O'Shea and socialized with the poet Robinson Jeffers and with the "radical Socialists" Sinclair Lewis, Ella Winter, Upton Sinclair, and Lincoln Steffens. Two years later in The Carmelite she published her somber poem memorializing the suicide of local artist Ira Remsen. In 1934 Young penned an enigmatic review of O'Shea's exhibition of charcoals at San Francisco's prestigious Palace of the Legion of Honor. O'Shea's celebrated portrait of Young was exhibited in 1940 and 1945 at the Carmel Art Association. Young believed that Point Lobos near Carmel was the psychic center of the Pacific Coast and "when the force of Lobos is released, a great thing will happen in America—but Lobos is not ready to make friends yet."

== Later life ==
In 1928 Young's book The Wonder-Smith and His Son, illustrated by Boris Artzybasheff, became a Newbery Honor Book (runner-up). During the 1920s she occasionally visited Halcyon, California, a Theosophical colony near San Luis Obispo. While living in a cabin behind John Varian's house there, Young finished writing The Tangle-Coated Horse and Other Tales, a 1930 Newbery Honor Book. In Halcyon her eclectic circle of friends included Ansel Adams, whom she had first met in 1928 or 1929, in San Francisco through their mutual friend Albert M. Bender. She traveled with Adams and his wife Virginia to Santa Fe, New Mexico, in 1929, spending time with friends, visiting artists at the Taos art colony, and staying with Mabel Dodge Luhan. In Taos, Young also visited with Georgia O'Keeffe. A photograph of Young and Virginia Adams appears in Ansel Adams's autobiography. Adams recalls that Young and fellow writer Mary Hunter Austin did not get along very well together but that conservationist Dorothy Erskine was one of Young's good friends.

In 1932 The Unicorn with Silver Shoes was released, illustrated by Robert Lawson. Young published her autobiography, Flowering Dusk: Things Remembered Accurately and Inaccurately in 1945. Later, she found particular affinity in the California Redwoods After battling cancer, Young was found dead in her Oceano home on 23 July 1956. She was cremated, and in October her ashes were scattered in a redwood grove. A grave marker is located in the Santa Maria Cemetery District, Santa Maria, California. Young left the bulk of her estate to the Save the Redwoods League.

== Legacy ==
Writers John Matthews and Denise Sallee released an annotated anthology of Young's work in 2012, At the Gates of Dawn: A Collection of Writings by Ella Young. Writer Rose Murphy released a biography of Young in 2008. The South County Historical Society of San Luis Obispo County, California, is active in the research and preservation of the history of the Dunites and Ella Young. An archive of her papers is currently held by the Charles E. Young Research Library Department of Special Collections at the University of California, Los Angeles.

== Selected publications ==
=== Poetry ===
- Poems (1906)
- The Rose of Heaven: Poems (1920)
- The Weird of Fionavar (1922)
- To the Little Princess: An Epistle (1930)
- Marzilian, and Other Poems (1938)
- Seed of the Pomegranate, and Other Poems (1949)
- Smoke of Myrrh, and Other Poems (1950)

=== Fiction ===
- The Coming of Lugh: A Celtic Wonder-Tale, illustrated by Maud Gonne (1909)
- Celtic Wonder-Tales, illus. Gonne (1910)
- The Wonder-Smith and His Son: A Tale from the Golden Childhood of the World, illus. Boris Artzybasheff (1927)
- The Tangle-Coated Horse and Other Tales: Episodes from the Fionn Saga, illus. Vera Bock (1929)
- The Unicorn with Silver Shoes, illus. Robert Lawson (1932)
- Celtic Wonder Tales and Other Stories, illus. Artzybasheff and Gonne (Edinburgh: Floris Books, 1988) – selected from the four collections

According to John Clute, the so-called tales are "based on Irish material" whereas The Unicorn is "an original tale, though resembling both [Kenneth] Morris and James Stephens in its telling of the trip of an Irish hero to the Afterlife". One library catalogue summary of the 1988 selection, perhaps by its publisher Floris Books, implies that "Young's classic re-telling of Celtic stories" comprises all four earlier collections. According to Ruth Berman, The Unicorn is "her original fantasy". As of 1999 it was long out-of-print but Celtic Wonder Tales, The Wonder-Smith and His Son, and The Tangle-Coated Horse were republished in 1991 by Floris Books and Anthroposophic Press.

=== Nonfiction ===
- Flowering Dusk: Things Remembered Accurately and Inaccurately (1945), OCLC 820545

Flowering Dusk was republished with permission of the Ella Young Literary Estate in 2025 in a limited edition of 300 by Holythorn Press.

== See also ==
- Fairies in Theosophy
- List of Irish writers
- Walter Evans-Wentz
