= Social season =

Annual period when the social elite holds social events

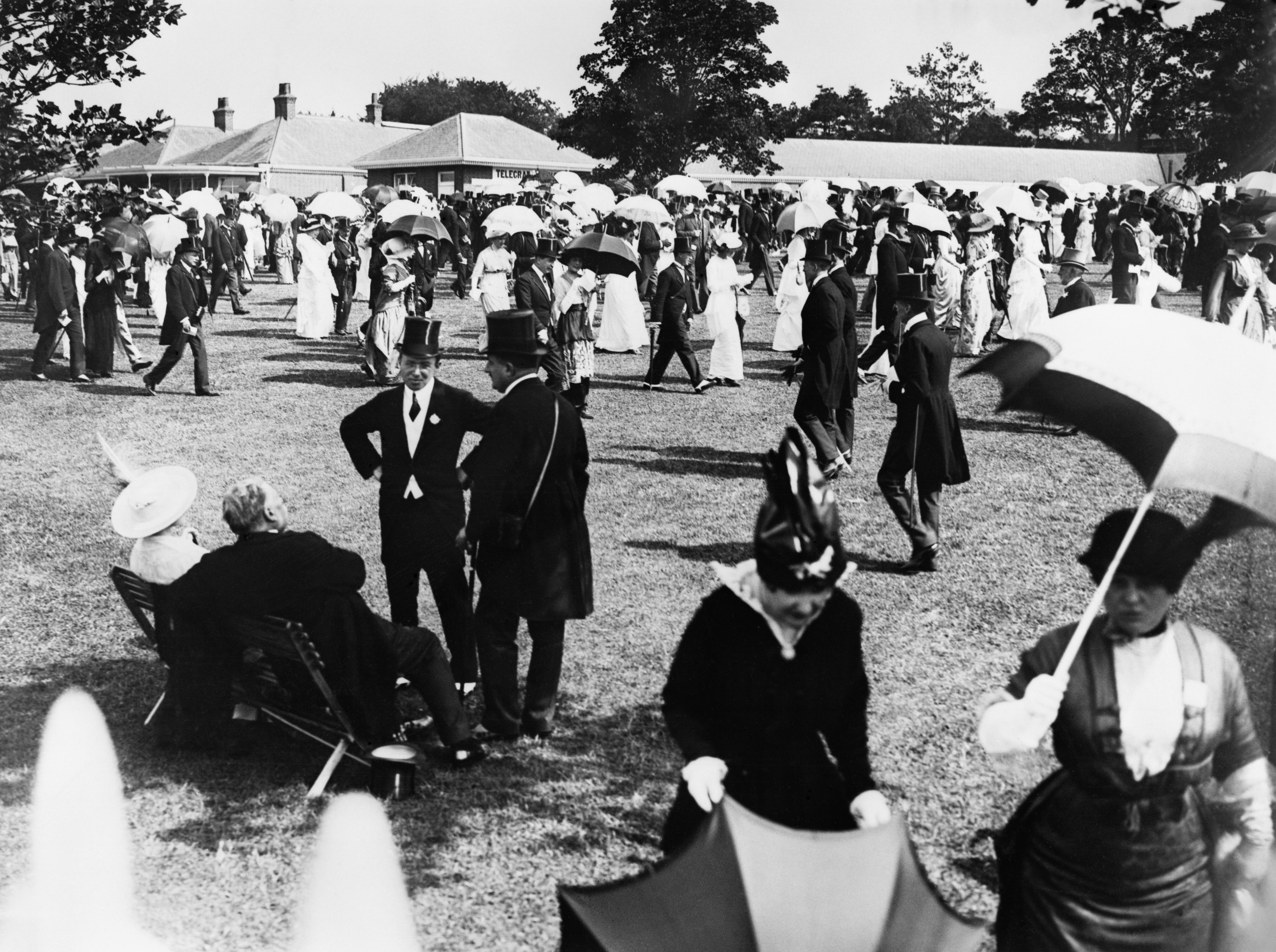
Racegoers attending Royal Ascot in England before the First World War.

The social season, or Season, refers to the traditional annual period in the spring and summer when it is customary for members of the social elite to hold balls, dinner parties and charity events. Until the First World War, it was also the appropriate time to reside in the city (generally meaning London in Great Britain and Dublin in Ireland) rather than in the country in order to attend such events.

In modern times in the United Kingdom, "The Season" is known to encompass various prestigious but mostly accessible events that take place during the spring and summer.

Traditionally the "Scottish social season" would follow the "London social season" and take place in the Scottish Highlands. There was a social season, or some semblance of one, in British colonies, including British India, British Hong Kong, British Shanghai, British Australia, British New Zealand and British Egypt. Despite being republics with no official aristocracies, the United States and France had social seasons in the 19th century. The Dublin social season began to decline after the formation of the Irish Free State and no longer occurs today.

== Social season in the United Kingdom ==
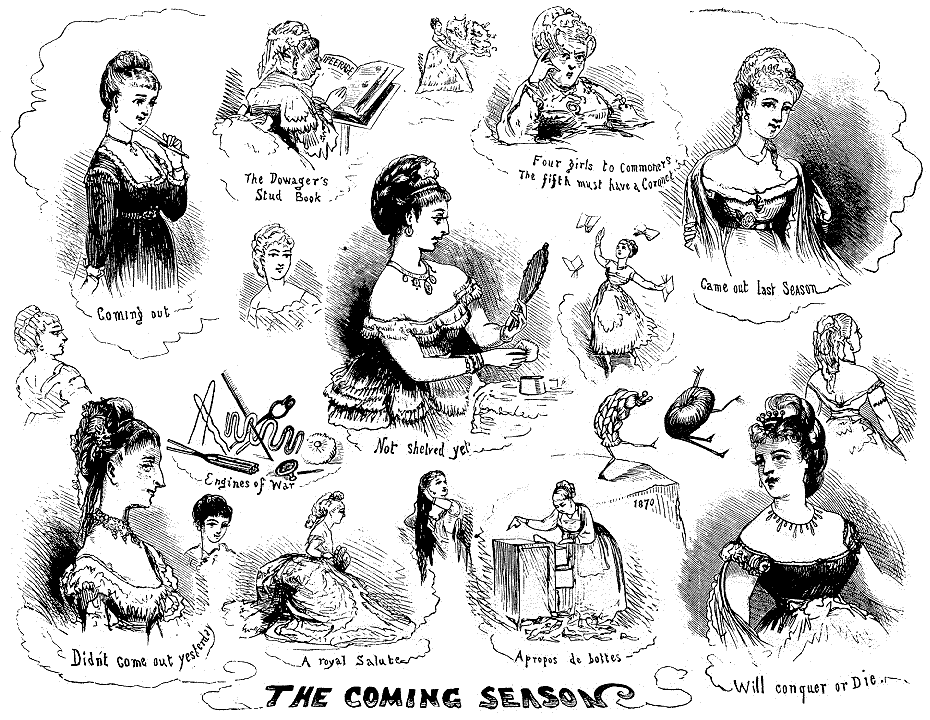
1870 cartoon satirising the coming of the London season.

=== The London social season ===
The London social season evolved in the 17th and 18th centuries, and in its traditional form it peaked in the 19th century. In this era the British elite was dominated by families of the nobility and landed gentry, who generally regarded their country house as their main home, but spent several months of the year in the capital to socialise and to engage in politics. The most exclusive events were held at the townhouses of leading members of the aristocracy. Exclusive public venues such as Almack's played a secondary role. The Season coincided with the sitting of parliament; it began some time after Christmas and ran until midsummer, roughly late June. Some sources say it began at Parliament's Easter session break.

The social season played a role in the political life of the country: the members of the two Houses of Parliament were almost all participants in the season, as all Peers sitting in the House of Lords were by definition nobility, and many if not most Members of the House of Commons were gentry. But the Season also provided an opportunity for the children of marriageable age of the nobility and gentry to be launched into society. Debutantes were formally introduced into society by presentation to the monarch at royal court during the Court Drawing Rooms and Queen Charlotte's Ball until the practice was abolished by Queen Elizabeth II in 1958 – reportedly at Prince Philip, Duke of Edinburgh's insistence. Queen Charlotte's Ball ceased to function in 1976, but has been relaunched since, by former debutante Jennie Hallam-Peel, without the monarch's involvement, and with more limited uptake; debutantes instead curtsy to "Queen Charlotte's Birthday Cake".

The traditional Season went into decline after the First World War, when many aristocratic families gave up their London townhouses. From then on, more society events took place at public venues, making it harder to maintain social exclusivity. The opulent coming-out party held for the 17 year-old Lady Sarah Consuelo Spencer-Churchill on 7 July 1939 at Blenheim Palace in Oxfordshire, less than two months before World War Two was declared, has been styled by some as "the last season ever". Socialite Henry (Chips) Channon noted in his diary: "I have seen much, travelled far and am accustomed to splendour, but there has never been anything like tonight".

The traditional end of the London Season is the Glorious Twelfth of August, which marks the beginning of the shooting season. Society would retire to the country to shoot birds during the autumn and hunt foxes during the winter before coming back to London again with the spring. For some time there was also the "Harrogate Season", where members of the upper classes would stop at Harrogate Spa to take in the waters on their way from London up to their shooting estates in the north.

=== Present day ===
In its modern form the British Season emerged following the decline of the traditional aristocratic social season after the First World War. While sometimes still referred to traditionally as the London Social Season (especially in regard to events hosted in London), it is seen as more open than formerly; some of the events now regarded as included within it take place in other parts of the country, away from central London. Western dress codes still apply to certain events, especially those in which the monarch maintains an official role. Increasingly, many of the events now constituting the season are hosted or sponsored by large companies.

Below is a list of events widely considered to form part of the modern social season.

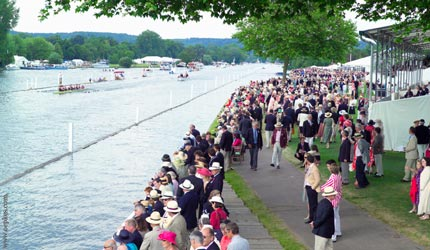
Henley Royal Regatta, 2008

=== Arts ===
- Glyndebourne Opera Festival
- The Proms
- Royal Academy Summer Exhibition
- West End theatre

=== Horticulture ===
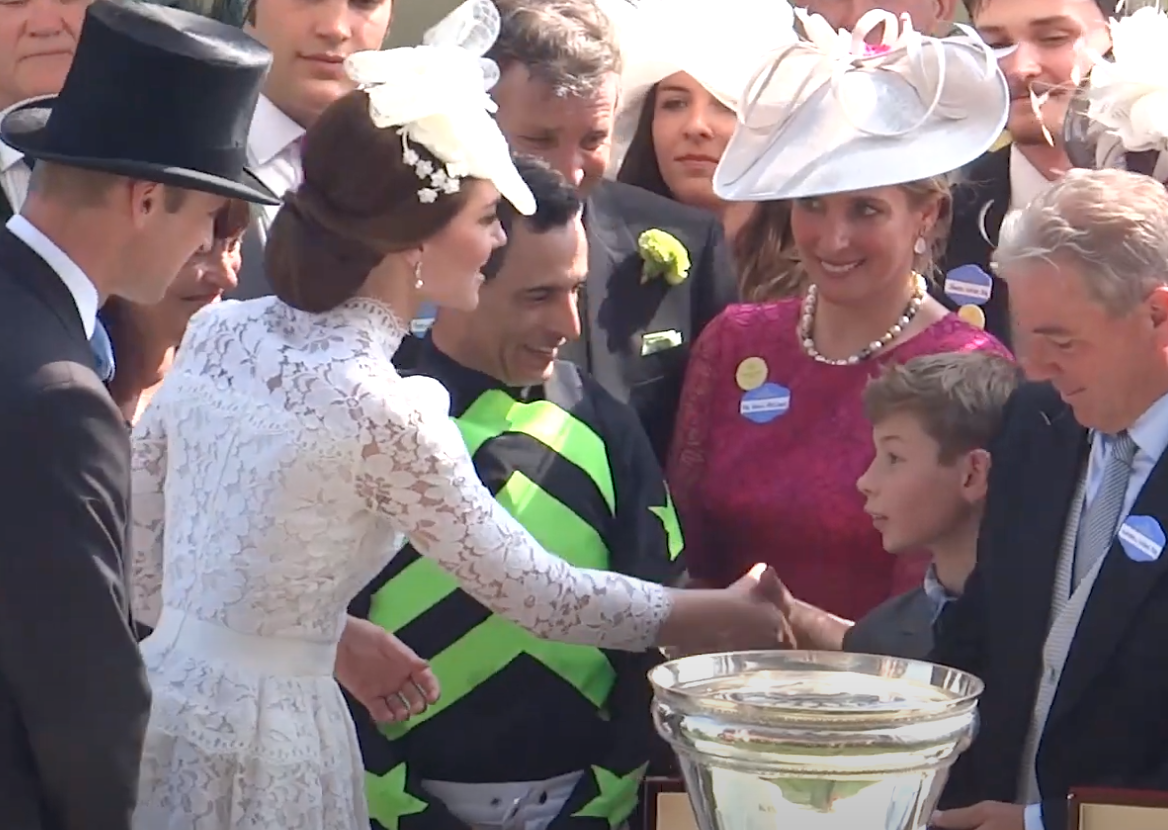
- Royal Ascot, 2017
  Chelsea Flower Show

=== Equestrianism ===
- Royal Ascot
- Cheltenham Gold Cup
- Badminton Horse Trials
- Grand National
- Royal Windsor Horse Show
- Epsom Derby
- Glorious Goodwood
- Cartier Queen's Cup
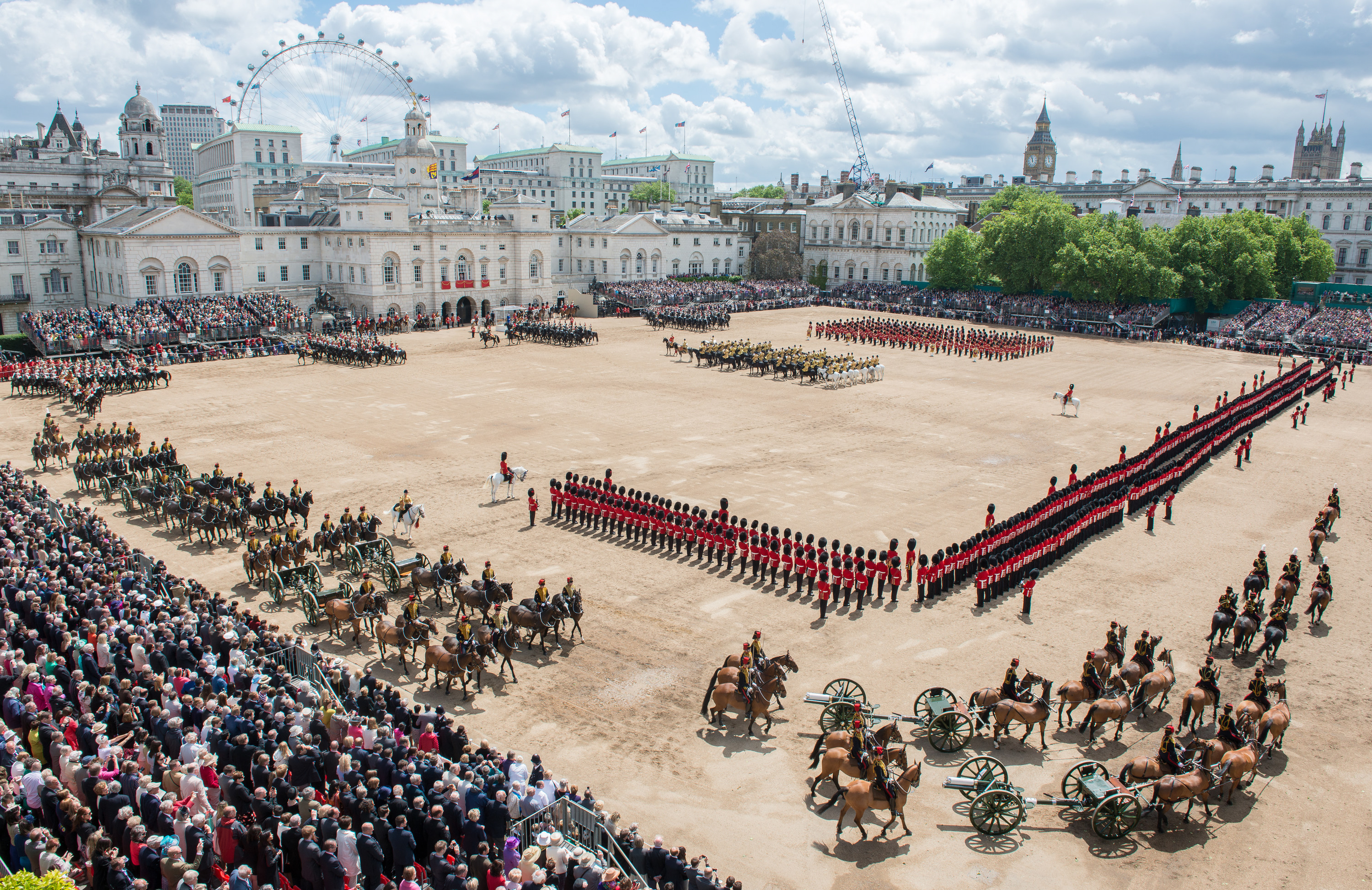
  Trooping the Colour, 2013

=== The Crown ===
- Trooping the Colour
- Garter Service of the Order of the Garter
- Royal Edinburgh Military Tattoo
- Royal Garden Parties at Buckingham Palace and Holyrood Palace

=== Sport ===
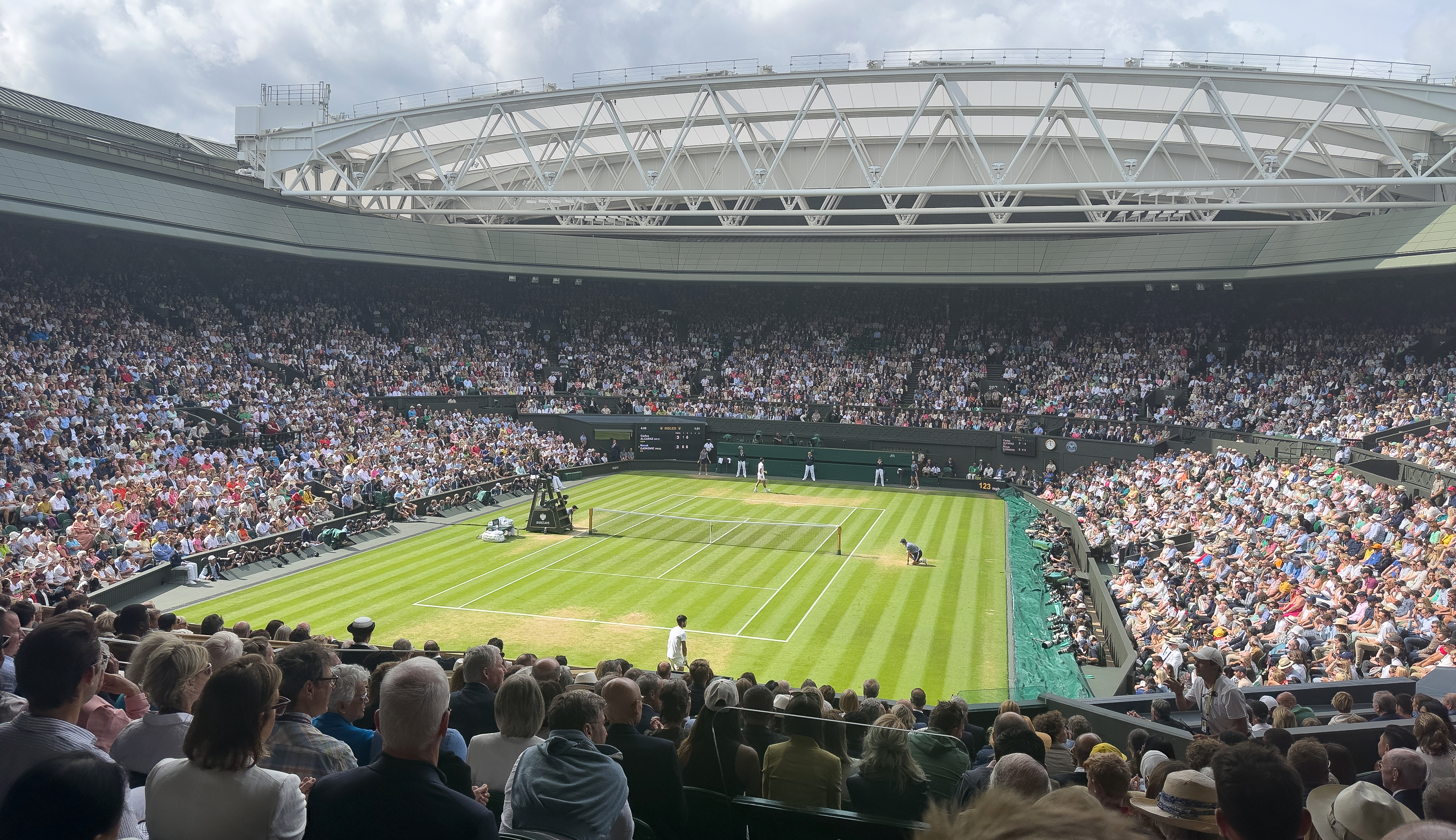
Wimbledon Championships, 2023

- Boat Race
- Henley Royal Regatta
- Guards Polo Club
- The Championships, Wimbledon
- Cowes Week
- Imperial Meeting
- Lord's Test cricket match
- British Grand Prix

The organisers of most events attempt to avoid date clashes, so it is generally possible to visit all of them in the same year.

==== Dress codes ====
Many events of the season have traditional expectations with regard to Western dress codes.

- At Royal Ascot, for example, hats are compulsory in most enclosures, and to be admitted to the Royal Enclosure for the first time one must either be a guest of a member or be sponsored for membership by two members who have attended for at least six years as a member. This continues to maintain a socially exclusive character for the Royal Enclosure. Gentlemen are required to wear either black or grey morning dress with waistcoat and a top hat. A gentleman must remove his top hat within a restaurant, a private box, a private club or that facility's terrace, balcony or garden. Hats may also be removed within any enclosed external seating area within the Royal Enclosure Garden. Ladies must not show bare midriffs or shoulders and must wear hats. In the Queen Anne Enclosure (formerly known as the Grandstand), gentlemen are required to wear lounge suits with ties and ladies must wear a hat.
- At Henley Royal Regatta, in the Stewards' Enclosure gentlemen must wear a lounge jacket and tie. Rowing club colours on a blazer or cap are encouraged, as is the wearing of boaters. A lady's skirt hem must reach below the knee and is checked before entry by the Stewards' Officers. Both ladies and gentlemen will be turned away if they fail to comply with the dress code, regardless of their prestige in rowing or elsewhere. Hats are encouraged but not required for ladies. When a student protested being denied entry to the Stewards' Enclosure for failing to meet the dress code, saying she had worn the dress "in the Royal Enclosure at Ascot and nobody said anything", a spokesman defended the dress code, saying "The intention is to maintain the atmosphere of an English Garden party of the Edwardian period by wearing a more traditional dress." Members must display their enamel badges at all times.
- At polo matches, it is usual for gentlemen to wear a blazer and always white trousers. Ladies should wear flat shoes, as the tradition of "treading in the divots" (pressing back into place the clods of turf thrown up by the horses' hooves) precludes wearing heels. The famous Club House at Guards Polo Club in Windsor Great Park is for the use of club members only, who wear individually made gold and enamel badges. Members' guests are given special gold-embossed tags.

=== Scottish social season ===
Following the London season, most of the high society participants would traditionally travel to the Scottish Highlands for the Scottish season, which would last around ten weeks. There, they would rent hunting grounds from Scottish lords in genteel poverty to hunt. They would also host parties at country estates which involved partridge shooting and hunting. The climax was the Hunt Ball, a semi-private event with attendees consisting both of invitees from high society and ticket purchasers. The Scottish season was more relaxed than the London one due to the Highlands tradition of hospitality to all.

=== Irish social season ===
The Irish Social Season was a period of aristocratic entertainment and social functions that stretched from January to St. Patrick's Day of a given year. During this period, the major and minor nobility left their country residences and lived in Georgian mansions in places like Rutland Square (now Parnell Square), Mountjoy Square, Merrion Square and Fitzwilliam Square in Dublin. Those with less financial means lived in (or in some cases rented) smaller properties in streets nearby.

The focal point of the Social Season was the move of the Lord Lieutenant of Ireland (the King's representative) from his 'out of season' residence, the Viceregal Lodge (now Áras an Uachtaráin, the residence of the President of Ireland) to live in state in the Viceregal Apartments in Dublin Castle, where he and his wife hosted a series of levées, drawing rooms, banquets and balls in the Castle.

The period of the social season also coincided with the parliamentary sessions of the Irish House of Lords, which many of the peers in Dublin would be attending. However, the Irish Parliament was abolished with the Act of Union, which merged the Kingdoms of Great Britain and Ireland in 1801.

With the abolition of the lord lieutenancy in 1922, the emergence of a new nationalist state (the Irish Free State) the same year, and the economic and social downturn that resulted from World War I, the Social Season dwindled and then died. Most of the aristocratic homes in Merrion Square and Fitzwilliam Square were sold and are now used as corporate offices.

Among the Irish peers who would reside in Dublin during the 'Social Season' were

- The Duke of Leinster, Ireland's senior peer
- The Marquess of Slane
- The Duke of Ormonde
- Viscount Powerscourt
- The Earl of Fingall
- The Earl of Headfort

=== Other British colonies ===
In British territories, high society and the social season revolved around the Government House, with an invitation to an event there often being no less exclusive than one to a court ball in London.

In British Australia and British New Zealand, there existed a high society. However, the high society's membership was very fluid and its members were way less formal in etiquette.

In British India, the cold season, from October to April, involved the presentation of the "fishing fleet" (debutantes), peaked at Christmas and concluded with the Viceroy's Ball in April. During the hot season, which lasted until October, female members would relocate to the hills to escape the heat, leaving their men to work. Membership in high society was synonymous with membership in the exclusive local club almost every English settlement had.

In British Shanghai and British Hong Kong, high society was less formal than India though more formal than Australia and New Zealand. In Hong Kong, high society would build houses on the Peak, which they would live in during the summer to combat the heat, although frequent mist made the situation little better. In Shanghai, the hot season was brutal while the cold season's weather was good. It was considered more luxurious and cosmopolitan than Hong Kong, and some described it as a rival to the best cities in Europe.

In British Egypt, there was a social season in Cairo during the colder months, November to April. Cairo was described as "a sort of Oriental Paris or sub-tropic London — with here and there pronounced suggestions of Atlantic City, Newport, and Longacre [Times] Square" per Burton Holmes. The main hotel was Shepherd's, and activities including visiting the pyramids, sailing in the Nile River, sporting events, gymkhanas, concerts, balls, and visiting the Khedive (later Sultan and then King) of Egypt's court.

== American social season ==
During the Gilded Age, the American social season was divided in two. One portion occurred in New York City during the winter, and one occurred in Newport, Rhode Island during the summer.

=== New York season ===
The New York season lasted from mid-November until the start of Lent. It opened with the start of the opera season at the Academy of Music and later the Metropolitan Opera House. The boxes were zealously guarded by the elite and were typically obtained through inheritance. Attending the opera at the grand opening and on Friday nights thereafter was the staple of the season. Caroline Astor would be treated like royalty by season participants. She would typically leave after the first act and leaving before her would be improper.

Other major events included the National Horse Show in November, presentation of debutantes at the Patriarchs' Ball in December and Mrs. Astor's annual ball in January. Throughout the winter there was an abundance of parties, including balls, receptions, and dinner parties. The season closed with the February Charity Ball and Lent was occupied with less glamorous events and preparation for the Newport season.

=== Newport season ===
Newport was the location of the summer season due to its exclusivity, typically lasting 8–10 weeks, terminating around Labor Day. The town was initially a resort town that attracted planters before the American Civil War. However, it quickly transformed into a retreat for the New York City elite, because they acquired the land, demolished old structures and erected great mansions in their place. The lack of hotels and the exorbitant fees for the beach changing room kept the masses out. Because Newport was so exclusive, it was considered the place to test whether someone was accepted by the Four Hundred.

=== Decline ===
In the 1890s, the society dispersed into small cliques and each clique gathered at a different location in the American Northeast for a lesser summer season. These events were less exclusive and the high society houses rarely rivaled the ones at Newport. During the decline, the "autumn season" emerged with participants engaging in outdoor activities such as hunting, riding, and indoor activities such as card games and amateur theater. Some "winter seasons" involved winter sports, such as skiing, tobogganing, and sledding, most notably the one at the Lake Placid Club. Others involved escaping the snow to Palm Beach and Daytona Beach.

By the turn of the 20th century, members of the Four Hundred de-emphasized their native "social seasons" and typically mingled with European elites in Europe for the summer in European seasons, such as the London and Paris seasons.

=== Washington season ===
There was a social season in Washington, DC in the late 18th century and 19th century. The Congressional Season began in December, or earlier if Congress began its session earlier, and ended in June when prominent members would take their summer vacations. The Official or Fashionable Season began on New Year's Day with general receptions at the White House and by the Cabinet officials and ended at the beginning of Lent. The Congressional Season is when entertainments and amusements peaked.

There were two types of receptions. Afternoon receptions were open to any reputable person dressed for the occasion while evening receptions typically required an invitation. Due to the transient nature of the city stemming from most of its elite being elected and appointed officials, many new money figures were able to establish themselves into high society there, such as Mary Leiter and Evalyn Walsh McLean.

== French social season ==
The high society of France in the 19th century was called le gratin ('upper crust') and consisted of those with old money, especially through aristocratic lineage and new money, consisting of wealthy industrialists, well-bred members of the Bourse and a few titled Jewish families, such as the Rothschilds. The little season lasted from December to Easter and consisted of bals blancs ('white balls', debutante balls), dinners, musical concerts, horse races, and the opera.

The Grande Saison ('Grand Season'), that lasted from mid-April to June, would open with the Concourse Hippiques, a horse show held in the Palais de l’Industrie on the Champs-Élysées. At the beginning of May, the Paris Salon would open, where patrons would check out artists' sculptures, paintings and decorative art. The Grand Season would conclude with the French Grand Prix, which had a large attendance. Fashion was paramount throughout the season, with ladies and mannequins displaying the latest fashions. After the Grand Prix, French high society would close their Paris homes and locate to the country for the summer and fall.

== Russian Social Season ==
During the 19th and early 20th century, the Social Season of St. Petersburg lasted from early January to Lent. The Nicholas Ball, an Imperial Ball hosted by the Tsar, was the first event of the season, usually held on January 10 or 11.

"The lives of the aristocracy were carefully scheduled to allow for the maximum pleasure with the minimum of effort. Women usually rose late; in winter, when balls carried on into the early morning, it was often not until noon; 'they appear,' noted one British visitor, 'to wish to exclude the light of day as far as possible'"

"The season could be exhausting. One winter, seventeen-year-old Anna Vyrubova attended twenty-two balls, in addition to countless teas, receptions, and dinners...There were fêtes indoors and out, and fashionable people scarcely saw the daylight for weeks at a time during the six hours of the winter’s sunshine..At Bals blancs, reserved for debutantes, young ladies appeared in white gowns and were accompanied by ever-watchful chaperones. Dancing was confined to quadrilles and waltzes; anything else was considered 'slightly unrefined,"

"The ballet was such an intrinsic part of life in society that entire weeks during the season were planned around its performances at the blue and gold Mariinsky Theater, where the stalls and boxes were permanently booked and handed down from father to son through subscription."

== In popular culture ==
- A London season features in Jane Austen's Sense and Sensibility and is often a key plot device in Regency romance novels.
- The 1927 novel Lucia in London by E. F. Benson is set during the London season in the 1920s.
- The 1938 novel Death in a White Tie by Ngaio Marsh is set during the London season.
- Eliza Doolittle's first public tryout and debut into high society in My Fair Lady, the musical film version of George Bernard Shaw's play Pygmalion, uses the idea of Ascot Racecourse as a setting.
- The novel The Leopard by Giuseppe Tomasi di Lampedusa, and the 1963 film of the same name by Luchino Visconti, portray the Palermitan season during the Risorgimento.
- The events of Julian Fellowes's novel Past Imperfect take place during the 1968 season in London.
- In the 2003 film What a Girl Wants, Lord Henry Dashwood invites his new-found daughter Daphne to attend the London Season.
- The 2009 young-adult novel The Season by Sarah MacLean portrays a young woman entering her first London Season.
- Vincente Minnelli's The Reluctant Debutante
- In the British period drama Downton Abbey the outspoken youngest daughter of the fictional Earl of Grantham, Lady Sybil, is presented as a debutante at court in London during her first season. The family are also portrayed to move to London for the duration of the season, returning to their country seat at the end of it. The show's 2013 Christmas Special (set in the summer of 1923) focuses on cousin Lady Rose McClare's debutante ball and presentation at court.
- Oscar Wilde's novel The Picture of Dorian Gray; and his plays Lady Windermere's Fan, An Ideal Husband and The Importance of Being Earnest.
- In Michel Faber's The Crimson Petal and the White, the Season is part of the plot.
- The Malory-Anderson Family Saga series of historical romance novels by Johanna Lindsey is set primarily in London, the first one opening in 1817. Throughout the series, one Season or another and the balls thrown during them, are mentioned in dialogue and are sometimes central to the plot lines themselves.
- Honoré de Balzac's novel The Muse of the Department contains a description of the London Season:

London is the capital of shops and of speculation, the government is made there. The aristocracy inscribes itself there only during sixty days, it there takes its orders, it inspects the government kitchen, it passes in review its daughters to marry, and equipages to sell, it says good-day and goes away promptly ; - it is so little amusing that it supports itself only for the few days called the season.

- Most of the Regency Romance novels by Georgette Heyer feature the London Season.
- The Royal Ascot racecourse was used as a filming location in the James Bond film A View to a Kill (1985), in which Bond was beginning his mission to defeat the villainous Max Zorin, whose horse was racing there.
- The events depicted in the Netflix period drama series Bridgerton take place during the London Season. Julia Quinn's Bridgerton novels, on which the Netflix series is based, also primarily take place in London during the Season.
- The London Season is an important part of the board game John Company.
- The London Season is the setting of the second arc in the manga and anime series Black Butler.
