= Anna Gertrude Hall =

American author and librarian

- Hall in 1913
- Born: West Bloomfield, New York, US
- Occupations: Writer, Librarian
- Writing career
- Genres: Children's, Tween, Young Adult

Anna Gertrude Hall (1882–1967) was a well known children and young adult author and librarian. Honored with a Newbery Medal honor in 1941 for her novel, Nansen.

== Early life and education ==
Anna Gertrude Hall was born in West Bloomfield, New York to Myron Edwin and Anna (Sterling) Hall on February 9, 1882. She received an A.B in 1906 from Leland Stanford Junior University and worked as an assistant in the library. She also earned a B.L.S in 1916 from New York State Library School.

== Career ==
During her career, Anna Gertrude Hall worked with many libraries and various organizations all over the country. Hall worked at Stanford University, first as a library assistant and then as a librarian and cataloger between the years of 1906 and 1914. From there, she went on to work at the Endicott Free Library as a librarian from 1915 to 1918. In 1918, the Endicott Free Library moved from the Mattoon Hotel Building to the former residence of Harlow E. Bundy, becoming the Ideal Home Library where Hall was the first librarian. From 1918 to 1921, Hall worked in Albany, NY with the New York State Department of Education as a library organizer. After her time with the New York State Department of Education, she moved to the Pacific Northwest and worked as a librarian in a county library located in Pendleton, OR from 1923 to 1927 and then a public library in Longview, WA from 1929 to 1932. According to the 1940 Census, Hall had moved back in with her parents in Davis, CA. Finally, from 1948 to 1962, Hall worked in the Palo Alto Medical Clinic.

== Work with the American Library Association ==
In 1938 she published The Library Trustee with the American Library Association (ALA) which was a handbook for helping library trustees understand their roles and responsibilities which was reviewed as being "indispensable" and "a practical reference book."

According to the Publisher's Note in the publication, Hall was chosen for this project based on the fact that she had worked within the public library system as a librarian for many years, as well as her experience with the New York State Department of Education.

Proceeding, this work was a shorter manual for library trustees titled The Trustee and His Library, published in 1927 by the ALA. While The Trustee and His Library worked as a more temporary guide for trustees, it lacked the extensive information needed for the subject area. The Library Trustee took the questions that weren't answered in the previous work and submitted to active trustees in the library field for their opinions on the matter. Their answers were then given to Hall to put the new manuscript, which would become The Library Trustee, together.

== Works ==
Hall was also the author of nonfiction children's books, most known for her illustrated biography about scientist and explorer, Fridtjof Nansen, which won the Newbery Medal honors in 1941.

- Nansen (1941)
- The Library Trustee (1938)
- Cyrus Holt and the Civil War (1964)

== Awards ==
- Newbery Medal, 1941 (Honor)

== Death ==
Anna died on February 6, 1967 in Santa Clara, California.
