= The Tangle-Coated Horse and Other Tales =

The Tangle-Coated Horse and Other Tales: Episodes from the Fionn Saga
- First edition (publ. David McKay Co.)
- Author: Ella Young
- Illustrator: Vera Bock
- Language: English
- Genre: Children's literature / Mythology
- Publisher: Longmans, Green and Co.
- Publication date: 1929
- Publication place: United States
- Pages: 185

The Tangle-Coated Horse and Other Tales: Episodes from the Fionn Saga is a 1929 children's mythology collection written by Ella Young and illustrated by Vera Bock. It is a collection of fourteen Irish legends from the Fenian Cycle about the hero Fionn mac Cumhaill and his band of warriors, the Fianna. The book was a Newbery Honor recipient in 1930.

== See also ==
- The High Deeds of Finn MacCool, a 1967 children's novel retelling the stories of Fionn mac Cumhaill and the Fenian Cycle
