= John P. Costas (business) =

American banker (born 1957)

- Born: January 27, 1957 (age 69)
- Education: Tuck School of Business (1981); University of Delaware (1979)
- Occupations: Investment banker, Hedge funds
- Employers: Costas Holdings LLC.; PrinceRidge Group; Dillon Read Capital Management (2005-07); UBS (1996-2005); CSFB (1981-96)

John P. Costas (born January 27, 1957) is an American businessman, banker, and trader. He is the former chairman and CEO of UBS Investment Bank, where he oversaw the growth of the Swiss bank's investment banking franchise globally from 2000 to 2005. From 2005 through 2007, Costas was the chairman and CEO of Dillon Read Capital Management, a UBS proprietary trading unit and alternatives management company. Prior to UBS Costas was co-head of Global Fixed Income at CS First Boston and founded GovTrade in 1992, an electronic bond trading platform.

Costas founded boutique securities firm the PrinceRidge Group in 2009, and retired from it in August 2012. He now is the managing member of Costas Family Holdings, a private investment firm.

== Career ==
=== Early career ===
Costas graduated from the University of Delaware in 1979 with a degree in political science, and received his MBA from the Tuck School of Business at Dartmouth College in 1981 with a concentration in finance.

FIRST BOSTON/CREDIT SUISSE_Costas began his career in 1981 as a fixed income sales person at First Boston Corporation, later Credit Suisse First Boston. Having joined as an trainee, Costas rose through the ranks and eventually became Co-Global Head of Fixed Income and a member of the Investment Bank's executive committee. John also founded GOVTRADE, which later became the foundation for Tradeweb in 1992. He executed the first electronic trade ever done on the treasury market with broker Mabon...a 25 million dollar 2 year note trade. Tradeweb was originally led by Jim Toffey, the employee Costas first assigned to manage Govetrade day to day. Today, (2026) Tradeweb is the market leader in electronic bond trading.

=== UBS Investment Bank ===
In 1996, Costas left Credit Suisse First Boston to join the Union Bank of Switzerland as head of North American fixed income. A year later, Costas was named head of Global Fixed Income Trading at Union Bank of Switzerland, a position he held first at Warburg Dillon Read (later UBS Warburg then UBS Investment Bank) after the bank's merger with Swiss Bank Corporation created UBS in 1998.

In December 2001, Costas was appointed CEO of UBS's investment banking division, at the time known as UBS Warburg. Costas' mandate was to turn UBS Warburg into a major Wall Street investment banking firm in the U.S. and compete with the largest bulge bracket American firms.

As UBS had already tried to build a business through takeovers, Costas shifted the growth strategy from acquiring entire firms toward hiring individual investment bankers or teams of bankers from rival firms. Costas had followed a similar approach in building out the UBS fixed Income business, hiring over 500 sales and trading personnel and increasing revenues from $300 million in 1998 to over $3 billion by 2001. SBC had built up its investment banking operations through the £860 million ($1.6 billion) acquisition of S.G. Warburg in 1995 and the $600 million purchase of Dillon, Read & Co. in 1997. Costas hired more than 30 senior U.S. bankers from 2001 through 2004 to jump start the growth of the bank as UBS was looking to UBS take business from incumbent U.S. firms in their own market. It was estimated that UBS spent as much as $600 million to $700 million hiring top bankers in the U.S. during this three-year period.

Costas pulled off a major coup by recruiting former Drexel Burnham Lambert investment banker, Ken Moelis. The hire of Moelis drew focus on UBS's efforts to increase its presence in investment banking. Moelis joined UBS from Donaldson Lufkin & Jenrette in 2001, shortly after that firm had been acquired by Credit Suisse First Boston. In his six years at UBS, Moelis ultimately assumed the role of Costas' lieutenant as president of UBS Investment Bank and was credited, along with Costas, with the build-out of UBS's investment banking operation in the United States. Among the bank's other major recruits during this period were Olivier Sarkozy, Morgan LeConey, Guy Phillips, Ben Lorello, David Tcholakian, and Jeff McDermott. From 2002 to 2004, when Costas took over as Chief Executive of the global investment bank, pretax profits surged 47 percent, to $3.6 billion.

=== Dillon Read Capital Management ===
In 2005, Costas was succeeded as CEO of UBS Investment Bank by Huw Jenkins, the former head of the Equities division.

Costas was offered the opportunity to start a new hedge fund within UBS. The hedge fund, named Dillon Read Capital Management, recruited a team of 120 trading and support professionals that were formerly involved in the proprietary trading businesses within the Investment Bank.

Dillon Read Capital Management, after having posted profits of $1.2 billion annually in both 2005 and 2006 (30% annual returns), was closed in May 2007 after losing 3% in the UBS proprietary accounts in that year's first quarter created friction within UBS (the outside fund was profitable throughout the period). Costas has said that Dillon Read's hedge fund, which was capped at $1.1 billion, delivered a six-month net return of 16% after fees.

=== PrinceRidge ===
Costas' next venture was a start-up securities firm, The PrinceRidge Group LLC, which he founded with former DRCM executive Michael Hutchins. Costas launched PrinceRidge with $25 million in working capital and 50 employees in 2009. PrinceRidge grew to over 90 employees by August 2010. The firm's main lines of business are structured and credit sales and trading. PrinceRidge also employs approximately 25 investment bankers providing advisory and capital raising services to over 200 middle market clients. Lastly, PrinceRidge provides secondary market-making support to over 500 fixed income securities via a proprietary electronic trading platform. By March 2010 it had $11 billion in assets under management.

On April 19, 2011, PrinceRidge Holdings LP announced a merger with Institutional Financial Markets Inc. (IFMI), in which IFMI invested $45 million in PrinceRidge Holdings LP in return for a majority ownership stake. IFMI also contributed over 60 sales, trading, and banking professionals to the new PrinceRidge. Costas sold his interest in the company to IFMI and retired from PrinceRidge in August 2012.

== Costas Family Office ==
Today he manages the Costas Family Office with varied investment interests and 12 employees.

== Team Secret ==
In March 2019, Team Secret (a global ESPORTS team) announced the hiring of Costas as Vice Chairman of Strategy and Finance. Team Secret experienced explosive growth during the 2017-2019 period, and is now a top 10 global Esports brand.

== Charitable work ==
Costas is a national board member of A Better Chance, which is focused on supporting the higher education of minority students. He has also established the Costas Family Foundation with a similar mandate of supporting education for disadvantaged youth primarily in the United States.
