= The Wonder Smith and His Son =

1927 book

The Wonder-Smith and His Son: A Tale from the Golden Childhood of the World
- Author: Ella Young
- Illustrator: Boris Artzybasheff
- Language: English
- Genre: Irish mythology
- Publisher: Longmans, Green, and Co.
- Publication date: February 1927
- Publication place: United States
- Pages: 190

The Wonder-Smith and His Son: A Tale from the Golden Childhood of the World is a 1927 children's mythology collection written by Ella Young and illustrated by Boris Artzybasheff. It is a collection of fourteen stories about Gubbaun Saor, the legendary Irish smith and architect. The book was a Newbery Honor recipient in 1928.

== Included stories ==
- How the Gunnaun Saur Got His Trade
- How the Gubbaun Proved Himself
- How the Gubbaun Saor Got His Son
- How the Gubbaun Tried His Hand at Match-making
- How the Son of the Gubbaun Met With Good Luck
- How the Gubbaun Saor Welcomed Home His Daughter
- How the Gubbaun Quarreled With Aunya, and What Came of It
- How the Son of the Gubbaun Saor Talked with Lords from a Strange Country
- The Building of Balor’s Dune
- How the Djinn Out of Balor’s Country Brought a Message to Aunya
- The Embassy of Balor's Son
- The Gubbaun Saor's Feast
- How the Gubbaun Saor Went Into the Country of the Ever-Young
- The Great Piast
