= Dhan Gopal Mukerji =

American novelist

- ধন গোপাল মুখোপাধ্যায়
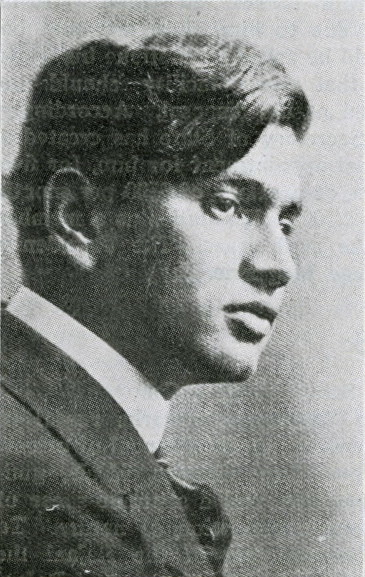
- Mukerji, c. 1916
- Born: 6 July 1890; Calcutta, Bengal Presidency, British India (now Kolkata, West Bengal, India)
- Died: 14 July 1936 (aged 46); New York City, New York State, USA
- Education: Stanford University
- Spouse: Ethel Ray Dugan
- Children: 1

Signature
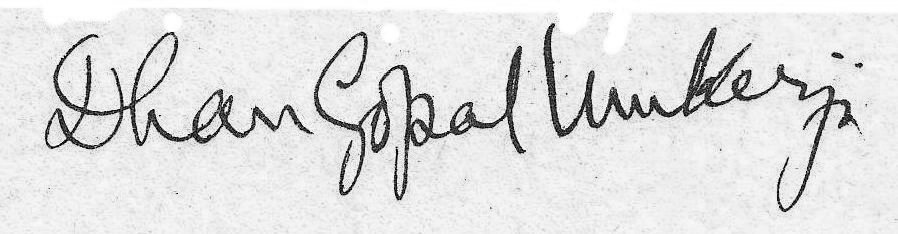

Dhan Gopal Mukerji (Bengali: ধন গোপাল মুখোপাধ্যায়; Dhan Gōpāl Mukhōpādhyāy) (6 July 1890 – 14 July 1936) was the first successful Indian man of letters in the United States and won a Newbery Medal in 1928. He studied at Duff School (now known as Scottish Church Collegiate School), and at Duff College, both within the University of Calcutta in India, at the University of Tokyo in Japan and at the University of California, Berkeley and Stanford University in the US.

== Biography ==
=== Early life in India ===
Dhan Gopal Mukerji was born in a Bengali Brahmin family on 6 July 1890, in a village near Calcutta on the edge of a jungle called Kajangal. His father was a lawyer who gave up his practice due to ill health and studied music instead, while also officiating as priest at the village temple. Dhan Gopal describes his childhood and adolescence in the first part ('Caste') of his autobiography, Caste and Outcast (1923). Caste details Dhan Gopal's induction into the Brahminical tradition of his ancestors, and his experiences of wandering for a year as an ascetic, as was the custom for boys in strict priestly households. However, disillusioned with the traditional role and impatient of the backward-looking element in strict Hindu society, he left the ascetic life to study at the University of Calcutta. Here, in the circle of his brother Jadugopal Mukherjee's friends, he came in contact with the ideas of the Bengal resistance. Jadu Gopal was subsequently jailed without trial from 1923 to 1927. Dhan Gopal later wrote a memoir about Jadu Gopal, titled My Brother's Face.

Dhan Gopal's family sent him to Japan to study industrial machinery and textiles in 1910. He became deeply disillusioned by the assembly line method of production and proclivity towards sheer efficiency which he viewed as dehumanizing, degrading and debasing. He was particularly shocked by how assembly line workers who had suffered serious accidents were quickly replaced by other workers, without consideration by the factory owners or employers for either their medical recovery, health benefits or adequate compensation. After a short stay in Japan, he boarded a ship for San Francisco.

=== In the San Francisco Bay Area ===
Barely out of his teens, Dhan Gopal had absorbed enough revolutionary ideology from his peers to have been well on the way to following in his brother's footsteps, and may not have left India entirely willingly. Dhan Gopal took his ideology with him to America where he fell in with a number of dirt-poor 'anarchists' like himself. His experiences among them, in San Francisco and New York, are detailed in 'Outcast', the second section of his autobiography.

In 1910, he enrolled at University of California, Berkeley but transferred to Stanford University, where he eventually received his A.B. degree in philosophy in 1914. In the San Francisco Bay Area, he looked about for a way to support himself and pay for his college education, and soon lit upon writing. Around 1916 he wrote Sandhya, Songs of Twilight and Rajani or Songs of the Night, two books of poems, and Laila Majnu, a musical play in three acts, all published by Paul Elder and Company of San Francisco.

He married Ethel Ray Dugan, an American artist and educator, and in 1918 they had a son, also called Dhan "Dan" Gopal Jr.

=== In New York City ===
In the 1920s, Mukerji moved to New York City and began his most prolific period of writing, published mainly by E.P. Dutton. Of his many children's books, Kari the Elephant was the first to see publication, in 1922, followed by Hari, the Jungle Lad two years later and Gay Neck, the Story of a Pigeon in 1927. Gay was the most successful; Mukerji won the 1928 Newbery Medal from the American Library Association recognising it as the year's best American children's book. The story features a carrier pigeon, Gay-Neck: his training and care in the flock owned by the narrator, his drafting as a messenger for the Indian army in France during World War I, and his return to India where he and his handler deal with the wounds and memories of war in the seclusion of a lamasery. One theme is "man and winged animals as brothers". Mukerji's other children's books include Ghond, the Hunter (1928), The Chief of the Herd (1929), Hindu Fables for Little Children (1929), Rama, the Hero of India (1930, produced for the children of Dalton School where his wife taught), The Master Monkey (1932), and Fierce-Face, the Story of a Tiger (1936). All these children's books were published by Dutton with professional illustrations, most in about 200 pages. Many of his works were reworkings of stories he had heard as a child. Others were inspired by his own experiences in India as a child among the jungles of Bengal, or as a yogi in various holy places.

Among Mukerji's writings for adults are A Son of Mother India Answers (1928) (partly in response to Katherine Mayo's Mother India), Devotional Passages from the Hindu Bible and Visit India with Me (1929), Disillusioned India (1930) and My Brother's Face (1932). The Face of Silence (1926) is about the nineteenth-century saint and visionary Ramakrishna Paramhansa and is said to have deeply influenced Romain Rolland.

The details of his later life are hazy, but there is some evidence to believe that relations with his wife entered a difficult phase at the end of his life. In spite of his many friends he felt isolated and marginalised in America, as he could do very little, beyond raising funds and entertaining visiting celebrities, to further the cause of the Indian independence movement. The choices he had made in life prevented him from ever returning permanently to India. The unhappiness of his final years drove him further into spirituality, fuelled his interest in the spiritual heritage of his motherland and gave urgency to his desire to interpret and explain India to the West.

== Death and legacy ==
On 14 July 1936, his wife discovered Mukerji had hanged himself in his New York City apartment. No note was left.

Dhan Gopal Mukerji is probably the first popular Indian writer in English. He pre-dates G. V. Desani and Mulk Raj Anand by some ten or twenty years. Krupabai Satthianadhan, the woman who wrote the novels Kamala and Saguna in the late nineteenth century, was certainly an accomplished writer, but her works did not reach a mass audience until she was rediscovered in the twentieth century. Scattered writings in English by Indians are encountered throughout the nineteenth century, such as the famous Rajmohan's Wife, Bankim Chandra Chatterjee's first novel, written in English after the manner of Scott. There was also notable work by figures such as Roquia Sakhawat Hussain, writer of Sultana's Dream (1905), the first science fiction piece in English by an Indian, comparable to Charlotte Perkins Gilman's Herland. But usually these are byproducts of Indian language work, and Dhan Gopal Mukerji is the first to write seriously and consistently in English.

This was not by choice, but was a product of his unfortunate situation. Dhan Gopal never lost the sense of mission which he shared with his brother, and throughout his life strove to complete the task he had set himself: to emancipate India from foreign rule and win for her culture and philosophy the respect he felt it deserved. In America he associated with fellow exiles like M.N. Roy, the founder of the Communist Party of India, to whom he is said to have suggested the adoption of the pseudonym 'Manabendra'.

Forbidden the more satisfying outlet of activism, he poured his feelings into his writing. Consequently, his language is magical and persuasive, and his observation of animals and their ways is accurate and unsentimental. In his work the Gond hunter and the Brahmin child are equals in their travels in the jungle, and Dhan Gopal Mukerji never (unlike Kipling) anthropomorphises the animals or draws a facile moral from them. Although he was acutely conscious of his high caste, he saw it more as a responsibility than a privilege, and neither patronised nor denigrated the so-called lower castes and communities. He was, however, less sound on the subject of women. He writes movingly of child prostitutes in America in the 1910s and 1920s, especially of their plight during the Great Depression, but he also romanticises the life of Rangini, a 'tawaif' (courtesan) encountered in Caste and Outcast. He also praises his mother's and sisters' strict asceticism, all the more so since his mother is at that time a widow, performing all the hard penances prescribed to Hindu widows of her caste.

== Selected works ==
- Sandhya, or Songs of Twilight. San Francisco, California: Paul Elder and Co. 1917.
- Rajani, or Songs of the Night (Elder, 1922)
- Laila Majnu (Elder, 1922)
- Kari The Elephant. J. E. Allen (illustrator). New York City, New York: E. P. Dutton. 1922. 8106610966.
- Caste and Outcaste (autobiography). London, England: E. P. Dutton. 1923. OCLC 315064372.
- Hari: the Jungle Lad. Morgan Stinemetz (illustrator). New York City, New York: E.P. Dutton. 1924. OCLC 1374320.
- My Brother's Face (Dutton, 1924)
- The Face of Silence (Dutton, 1926)
- Gay Neck: The Story of a Pigeon. Boris Artzybasheff (illustrator). New York City, New York: Dutton. 1927. OCLC 731405316.
- Ghond, the Hunter (Dutton, 1928), illus. Boris Artzybasheff
- A Son of Mother India Answers (Dutton, 1928)
- The Chief of the Herd (Dutton, 1929), illus. Mahlon Blaine
- Devotional Passages from the Hindu Bible (Dutton, 1929)
- Hindu Fables for Little Children (Dutton, 1929), illus. Kurt Wiese
- Visit India With Me (Dutton, 1929)
- Disillusioned India (Dutton, 1930)
- Rama: The Hero of India (Dutton, 1930), illus. Edgar Parin D'Aulaire
- The Song of God: Translation of the Bhagavad-Gita (Dutton, 1931)
- The Master Monkey (Dutton, 1932), illus. Florence Weber
- Fierce-face, the Story of a Tiger (Dutton, 1936), illus. Dorothy P. Lathrop

Awards
Preceded by Will James	Newbery Medal winner 1928	Succeeded by Eric P. Kelly
