= William Montgomery Vermilye =

American banker

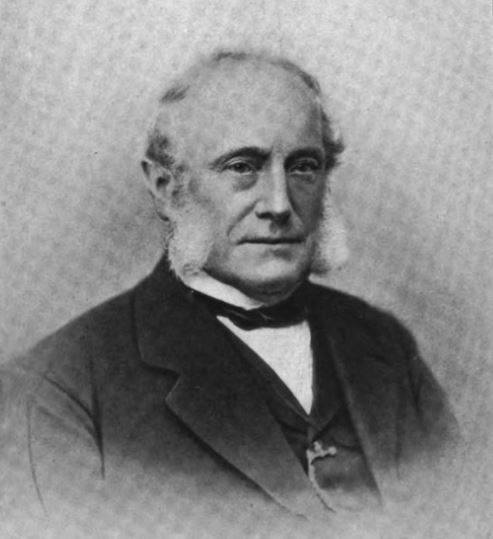

22nd President of the Saint Nicholas Society of the City of New York
- In office 1877–1878
- Preceded by: Augustus Rodney Macdonough
- Succeeded by: Robert George Remsen

Personal details
- Born: September 30, 1801 New York City, New York, U.S.
- Died: June 18, 1878 (aged 76) New York City, New York, U.S.
- Spouse: Hester Anthony De Reimer (m. 1827)
- Relations: W. R. Vermilye (brother)
- Children: 10
- Parent(s): William W. Vermilye; Mary Montgomery Vermilye

William Montgomery Vermilye (September 30, 1801 – June 18, 1878) was an American banker and philanthropist.

== Early life ==
Vermilye was born in New York City on September 30, 1801. He was the eldest child born to Mary (née Montgomery) Vermilye (1782–1847), who was of Irish Montgomery lineage, and William W. Vermilye (1780–1849), a venerated elder in the Presbyterian Church. Among his siblings were the Rev. Dr. Thomas E. Vermilye and Rev. Dr. Robert G. Vermilye and Col. Washington Romeyn Vermilye, who married Elizabeth Dwight Lathrop, daughter of U.S. Representative Samuel Lathrop.

Vermilye, who was of Huguenot ancestry, was "a descendant of one of the oldest families of New-York, the original founder of the family, Mr. John Vermilye, having immigrated to this country from England in 1690."

== Career ==
After a common school education in New York, he entered business at the age of eighteen in the office of the Commercial Advertiser which his father was proprietor. He left the Advertiser and joined the Commercial Bank, staying until the Spring of 1830 when the Merchants' Exchange Bank was organized and Vermilye was the first cashier, staying in that role until 1840, when he became cashier of the Manhattan Banking Association. In 1846, he became treasurer of the Ohio Life and Trust Company after the resignation of Newton Perkins, holding this position until 1849.

In 1849, Vermilye, along with his brother Col. Washington Romeyn Vermilye and George Carpenter, founded the firm of Carpenter & Vermilye, which became one of the most prominent banking houses in New York City and was known for selling war bonds during the U.S. Civil War. After Carpenter's retirement in 1858, the firm was renamed Vermilye & Co. Ten years later in 1868, Vermilye himself retired. (Note: In 1905, Carpenter & Vermilye was renamed after its principal partner, William A. Read. In 1921, the firm was again renamed as Dillon, Read & Co. to include partner Clarence Dillon. In 1991, it was acquired by Barings Bank and, in 1997, it was acquired by Swiss Bank Corporation, which was in turn acquired by UBS in 1998.) While active in business, he was a trustee of the Mutual Life Insurance Company and served as vice-president and acting president of the Mechanics Banking Association. In 1863, he declined, along with Abraham Lincoln, Robert B. Roosevelt, John J. Astor Jr. and Nathaniel Sands, to endorse John Adams Dix for mayor of New York City.

In 1868, along with James Lenox, he was also a founder of the Presbyterian Hospital in New York City. In addition, he was an incorporator of the New York Society for the Prevention of Cruelty to Children in 1875 with Elbridge Thomas Gerry, serving as a director for two years. In 1877, he became the 22nd President of the Saint Nicholas Society of the City of New York, a charitable organization in New York City of men who are descended from early inhabitants of the State of New York.

== Personal life ==
On April 4, 1827, Vermilye was married to Hester Anthony De Reimer (1810–1894). Hester was the youngest daughter of Hester (née Anthony) De Reimer and Samuel Babbington De Reimer, a Roosevelt family descendant through his paternal grandmother. (Note: Samuel Babbington De Reimer (1768–1815) was the grandson of Catherine (née Roosevelt) De Reimer (1711–1741), a granddaughter of Nicholas Roosevelt (1658–1742).) Together, William and Hester were the parents of:

- William Edward Vermilye (1828–1888), who married Julia E. Murdock (1832–1928).
- Thomas Edward Vermily (1828–1828), who died in infancy.
- Mary Anthony Vermilye (1830–1913), who married Charles A. Davison, Esq. (1824–1900) in 1850.
- Louise Maria Vermilye (1832–1902), who married lawyer John Ebenezer Burrill (1822–1893) in 1853.
- Robert Montgomery Vermilye (1835–1878), who married Amanda Conover (1840–1874) in 1862. After her death, he married Anna Hunter (1844–1913) in 1876.
- Lewis Forman Vermilye (1838–1851), who died aged 13.
- Emily Augusta Vermilye (1840–1845), who died young.
- Frederick L. Vermilye (1842–1845), who died young.
- Elizabeth Perkins Vermilye (1844–1846), who died young.
- Charles Augustus Vermilye (1848–1907), who lived in Englewood, New Jersey.

Vermilye died of Bright's disease of the kidneys at his home, 39 West 31st Street in New York City, on June 18, 1878. After a funeral at his residence, he was buried at Woodlawn Cemetery in the Bronx.
