= James Ormsbee Chapin =

American painter (1887–1975)

James Ormsbee Chapin (9 July 1887 – 12 July 1975) was an American painter and illustrator. He was the father of jazz musician Jim Chapin and grandfather of folk singer Harry Chapin.

== Life ==
Chapin was born in West Orange, New Jersey, to James A. Chapin and Delia S. Ryder. He studied at Cooper Union, the Art Students League of New York, and abroad at the Royal Academy of Antwerp, Belgium. Early in his career he won the Temple Gold Medal of the Pennsylvania Academy of the Fine Arts for his portrayals of the Marvin Family. Chapin executed numerous portraits of well-known public figures; at least five of his portraits were commissioned by TIME as cover art. Other illustrators of Time covers during the period from 1942 to 1966, which has been called the golden age of Time covers, included Boris Artzybasheff, Robert Vickrey, Bernard Safran and Boris Chaliapin.

Chapin's works have been acquired by many private collectors and for the permanent collections of the many institutions such as The Pennsylvania Academy of Fine Arts (where he taught portraiture), The Phillips Collection, The Art Institute of Chicago, The Newark Museum, Amherst College, The Dallas Museum of Art, Texas; The Asheville Art Museum, The Currier Gallery of Art, The Five College Museums Collections, The Harvard Art Museums, and The Indianapolis Museum of Art.

Chapin had a significant impact on the early history of Regionalists Thomas Hart Benton, John Steuart Curry, and Grant Wood with his 1920's series of portraits of the Marvin family. His work was also part of the painting event in the art competition at the 1932 Summer Olympics.

Chapin married Abby Beal Forbes in New York in 1918. They had one son, James Forbes Chapin, who became a celebrated jazz drummer and was the father of singer-songwriter Harry Chapin. Chapin and Forbes later divorced. While teaching in California in the late 1930s, Chapin met Mary Fischer; they married in 1941. Largely due to his opposition to United States foreign policy in Southeast Asia, he moved to Canada in 1969, and died in Toronto in 1975.

== Legacy ==
The James Ormsbee Chapin Papers, which contain correspondence, sketches, articles, reproductions, and proofs, were donated to the Delaware Art Museum in 1994.

== Sources ==
- Chapin, James. "The Seven Ages of a Physician: A Series of Seven Paintings" Ciba Pharmaceutical Products, Inc, 1943.
- Eldredge, Charles C. "Tales from the Easel: American Narrative Paintings from Southeastern Museums, circa 1800-1950" University of Georgia Press, 2004.
