= Robert Vickrey =

American artist (1926–2011)

- Born: Robert Remsen Vickrey; August 26, 1926; New York City, New York, U.S.
- Died: April 17, 2011 (aged 84); Naples, Florida, U.S.
- Education: Reginald Marsh; Kenneth Hayes Miller
- Known for: Tempera painting
- Notable work: Admiral Benbow, Early Snow
- Movement: Surrealism
- Website: robertvickrey.com

Robert Remsen Vickrey (August 26, 1926 – April 17, 2011) was an American artist and author based in Massachusetts who specialized in the ancient medium of egg tempera. His paintings are surreal dreamlike visions of sunset shadows of bicycles, nuns in front of mural-painted brick walls, and children playing.

== Early life ==
Vickrey was born in Manhattan on August 26, 1926. He was the son of Claude Claire Vickrey and Caroline Remsen McKim (1903–1936), the granddaughter of Robert George Remsen through whom he was descended from many of New York's oldest families. Vickrey's father, while at his graduating ball from the U.S. Naval Academy, courted Wallis Warfield (who was better known later in life as the Duchess of Windsor). His parents later divorced and his mother remarried to Caleb van Heusen Whitbeck III, in 1929, with whom she had another son, Caleb Whitbeck.

Vickrey graduated from the Pomfret School, then studied at Wesleyan University before receiving a Bachelor of Arts degree from Yale University in 1947, followed by a year in New York studying with Reginald Marsh and Kenneth Hayes Miller at the Art Students League. He returned to the Yale School of Fine Arts, receiving a Bachelor of Fine Arts degree in 1950.

== Career ==
He was one of the illustrators of Time covers during the period from 1942 to 1966, which has been called the golden age of Time covers. His portrait of J.D. Salinger, from a 1961 Time cover, was hung at the National Gallery of Art following the writer's death in 2010. Other cover artists during this period included Boris Artzybasheff, James Ormsbee Chapin, Bernard Safran and Boris Chaliapin.

His work with tempera has aligned him with fellow tempera artists Andrew Wyeth, Jared French and Paul Cadmus, who also "attempted to combine Surrealism with Realism, the amalgam being termed Magic Realism."

In 1960, he exhibited his paintings at the Midtown Galleries at 17 East 57th Street. In 1982, a retrospective exhibition of his work was held at the Museum of Art, Science and Industry in Bridgeport, Connecticut.

In the 1970s, he wrote two books: New Techniques in Egg Tempera (1973), with Diane Cochrane, and Robert Vickrey: Artist at Work (1979).

=== Legacy and honors ===
His works are in the collections of the Metropolitan Museum of Art, the Whitney Museum of American Art, the Brooklyn Museum in New York, the Corcoran Gallery of Art, and The Museum of Modern Art, in Rio de Janeiro.

Vickrey received the Gerard Manley Hopkins Award for Excellence in the Arts from Fairfield University and the Regina A. Quick Center for the Arts in March 2009, where a retrospective exhibition of Vickrey's paintings from 1951-2007 was held at the Thomas J. Walsh Art Gallery. The award and exhibition coincided with the publication of "Robert Vickrey: The Magic of Realism," written by Dr. Philip Eliasoph, a Fairfield University professor of art history.

== Personal life ==
Vickrey was married to Marjorie, with whom he had two son and two daughters, Scott Vickrey, Elizabeth Nicole (née Vickrey) McMartin, Wendy Caroline Vickrey, and Sean Vickrey. After Marjorie's death in 1997, he married Beverly Bowen Rumage.

Vickrey died at his home in Naples, Florida, on April 17, 2011, at the age of 84.

== Gallery ==
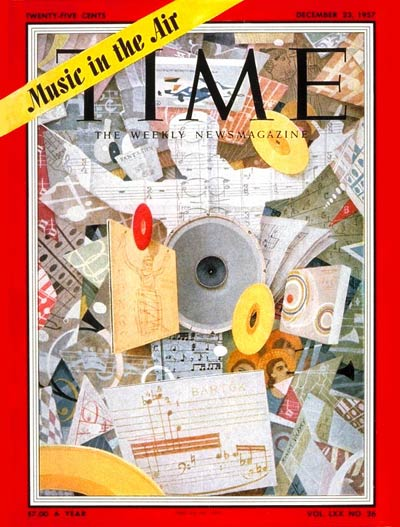
Vickrey's 1957 Time cover.

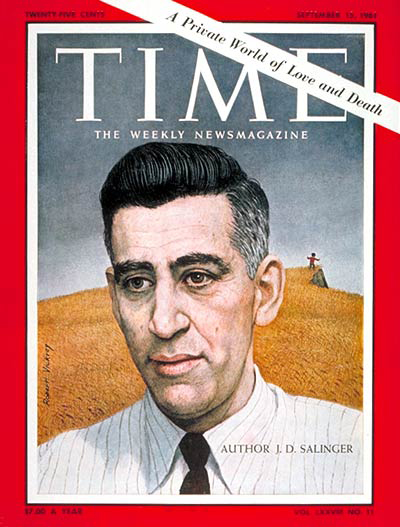
Vickrey's 1961 Time cover of J.D. Salinger.

== See also ==
- Andrew Wyeth
- Egg Tempera
