= Kenneth Morris (author) =

Welsh author and theosophist

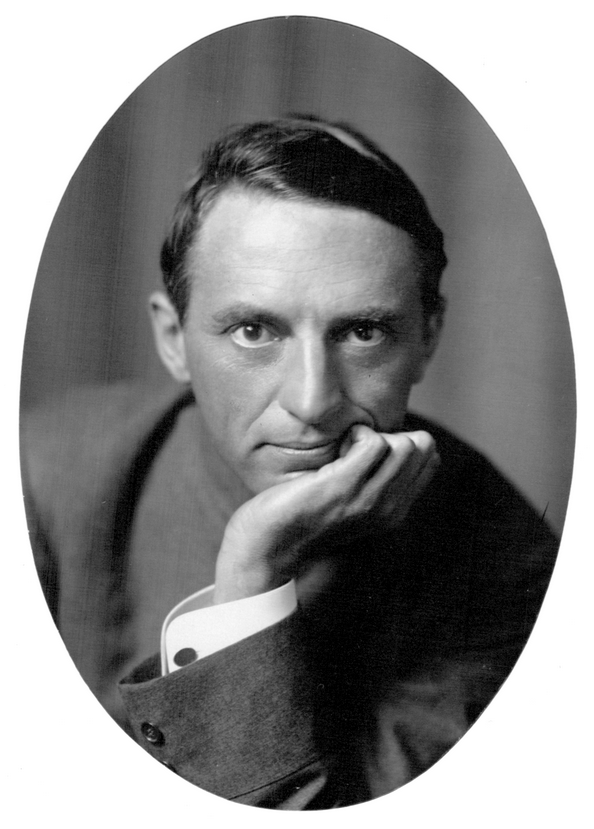
- Kenneth Morris, 1920s.
- Born: 31 July 1879
- Died: 21 April 1937 (aged 57)
- Occupation: Writer

Kenneth Vennor Morris (31 July 1879 – 21 April 1937), sometimes using the Welsh form of his name Cenydd Morus, was a Welsh author and theosophist. Born in South Wales, he relocated to London with his family as a child, and was educated at Christ's Hospital. In 1896, he lived in Dublin for a while. Here Morris met W. B. Yeats and Ella Young, and became friends with George William Russell. From 1908 to 1930, Morris lived in California as a staffperson of the Theosophical Society headquarters at Point Loma. Here Morris worked with Katherine Tingley to promote the teachings of Theosophy. The last seven years of his life were spent back in his native Wales, during which time he founded seven Welsh theosophical lodges.

Morris wrote short fantasy stories, poems and articles for Theosophical magazines. These stories were based on various world mythologies, including Welsh, Norse, Chinese and Aztec. Some of these stories were gathered in the collection The Secret Mountain and Other Tales (1926).

Morris was a friend of the writer Talbot Mundy, and the two writers often commentated on each other's work in the magazine The Theosophical Path.

== Reception ==
According to Ursula K. Le Guin, Morris is one of the three master prose stylists of fantasy of the 20th century, together with E. R. Eddison and J. R. R. Tolkien.

Fantasy historian Darrell Schweitzer has described Kenneth Morris as "one of the finest stylists ever to write fantastic fiction and also one of the least known."

== Works ==
- The Fates of the Princes of Dyfed (1914) As Cenydd Morus.
- The Crest-Wave of Evolution (1919-1921)
- The Secret Mountain and Other Tales (1926)
- Book of the Three Dragons (1930)
- The Chalchiuhite Dragon: A Tale of Toltec Times (1992)
- The Dragon Path: Collected Tales of Kenneth Morris (1995)
