= Nansen (biography) =

1940 children's biography of Fridtjof Nansen written by Anna Gertrude Hall

- First edition
- Author: Anna Gertrude Hall
- Illustrator: Boris Artzybasheff
- Language: English
- Genre: Children's literature
- Publication date: 1940
- Publication place: United States

Nansen is a 1940 children's biography of Norwegian polar explorer Fridtjof Nansen written by Anna Gertrude Hall and illustrated by Boris Artzybasheff. It was a Newbery Honor recipient in 1941.
