= Abraham B. Baylis =

American businessperson

President of the New York Stock Exchange
- In office 1862–1863
- Preceded by: W. R. Vermilye
- Succeeded by: Henry G. Stebbins

Personal details
- Born: Abraham Burtis Baylis; November 5, 1811 Queens, New York, U.S.
- Died: July 15, 1882 (aged 70) Brooklyn, New York, U.S.
- Spouse: Deborah McDonald (m. 1840)
- Children: 4
- Occupation: Businessperson, banker

Abraham Burtis Baylis Sr. (November 5, 1811 – July 15, 1882) was an American businessperson who served as president of the New York Stock Exchange during the U.S. Civil War.

== Early life ==
Baylis was born in Queens on November 5, 1811, and spent his entire life on Long Island. He was a son of Mary (née Burtis) Baylis (1778–1861) and Thomas Balyis (1769–1821) of Springfield. Among his siblings from his parents marriage was Thomas Baylis and Mary Elizabeth Baylis. Before his parents marriage, his mother was married to William Ludlum, who died in 1802, and his father was married to Elizabeth Nostrand, who died in 1804. Both of his parents had several children from their first marriages. His paternal grandparents were Daniel Baylis and Catherine (née Ludlam) Baylis and his maternal grandparents were Abraham Burtis and Jane (née Everett) Burtis.

As a young man, he came to Brooklyn and became involved in the hardware trade. In 1839, he became a clerk in the banking house of his brother-in-law, J. B. Cochran.

== Career ==
In 1841, Baylis became a member of the New York Stock Exchange and later served as one of the governors of the Exchange. He also served as the first president of the Stock Exchange Building Company (which owned the block in which the Exchange formerly held its sessions) and during the Civil War, he served as president of the Exchange. He was a trustee of the Union Ferry Company, the Brooklyn City Railway, the Brooklyn Trust Company, the Mechanics Bank, the Brooklyn Savings Bank and the Mechanics Insurance Company. According to his obituary in The New York Times:

"The influence of Abram B. Baylis in the Stock Exchange was as great as that ever exercised by any other one member. Many of the measures which have brought prosperity and strength to that institution were the result of his thought and labors."

He was a trusted insider and close business associate of Cornelius Vanderbilt, and served as a director of the Harlem Railroad Company, the Chicago and Northwestern Railroad Company and the Wabash Railroad Company. His office was located at 44 Exchange Place. At the time of his death, he was "one of the oldest and best known men of Wall-street." He was succeeded in business by his sons under the firm name Abraham B. Baylis & Company, later known as A. B. Baylis Jr. & Co.

Baylis was active in public service in Brooklyn and regularly provided his counsel for various municipal affairs. In 1851, he served as a member of the Board of Aldermen representing the 10th Ward of the Borough. In addition, he was a member of the school board for a quarter of a century. He was a member of the original Park Commission. He also serve as a trustee of Packer Collegiate Institute, the Brooklyn Library, and a member of the Long Island Historical Society.

== Personal life ==
In 1840, Baylis was married to Deborah McDonald (1809–1894) of Bedford, New York where Baylis had a summer home. Abraham and Deborah were the parents of two sons and two daughters, including:

- Ellen McDonald Baylis (1843–1916), who married Samuel D. Craig.
- Abraham Burtis Baylis Jr. (1845–1896), who largely became his successor. He married Agnes Harvard Marvin in 1873, a daughter of Charles R. Marvin of Brooklyn.
- Mary Baylis (1847–1916), a twin who did not marry.
- William Baylis (1847–1919), who married Adelaide Eliza Brooks.

Baylis, a member of the Second Presbyterian Church for many years, died at his residence, 76 Remsen Street in Brooklyn, on July 15, 1882. After his death, he was buried at Green-Wood Cemetery in Brooklyn.
