= Seven Simeons =

1937 picture book

- Title page for Seven Simeons: A Russian Tale (1937)
- Author: Boris Artzybasheff
- Publisher: Viking Books
- Publication date: 1937
- Pages: unpaged
- Awards: Caldecott Honor

Seven Simeons: A Russian Tale is a 1937 picture book by Boris Artzybasheff. The story is a Russian fairy tale of seven brothers who work together to find a wife for the King. The book was a recipient of a 1938 Caldecott Honor for its illustrations.
