= Dillon, Read & Co. =

Former investment bank in New York City

- Trade name: Dillon Read
- Industry: Investment banking
- Founded: 1832; 194 years ago New York City, New York, U.S.
- Defunct: 1997
- Successor: UBS

Dillon, Read & Co. was an investment bank based in New York City. In 1991, it was acquired by Barings Bank and, in 1997, it was acquired by Swiss Bank Corporation, which was in turn acquired by UBS in 1998.

== History ==
=== Carpenter & Vermilye ===
Dillon Read traces its roots to 1832 with the founding of the Wall Street brokerage firm Carpenter & Vermilye by Col. Washington Romeyn Vermilye, George Carpenter, and William Montgomery Vermilye. The firm was notable for selling war bonds during the U.S. Civil War.

=== Dillon, Read & Co. ===
In 1905, it was renamed after its principal partner, William A. Read. In 1921, it was renamed as Dillon, Read & Co. to include partner Clarence Dillon. The firm underwrote bonds issued by New York City and underwrote stocks and bonds of railroads and other companies. In 1921, the firm managed the rescue of faltering Goodyear Tire & Rubber Company. In 1925, it engineered the buyout of Dodge Brothers and the sale of the company to Chrysler in 1928. In the 1930, it underwrote foreign bonds and arranged financing for the petroleum industry. In 1937, it underwrote the bonds used to finance the Triborough Bridge.

After WWI, they were the largest lender to Germany for reconstruction and reaped great profits, whose funds were used to found the IG Farben company and Vereinigte Stahlwerke during the interwar period.

C. Douglas Dillon, the son of Dillon Read co-founder Clarence Dillon, was chairman of the company before serving as U.S. Secretary of the Treasury under John F. Kennedy and as U.S. Undersecretary of State and U.S. Ambassador to France under Dwight Eisenhower.

Nicholas F. Brady was chairman from 1970 to 1982, before serving as a United States Senator from New Jersey and as U.S. Secretary of the Treasury under Ronald Reagan and George H. W. Bush. Mehdi Ali, was CEO from 1994 until the company's bankruptcy in 1995.

In July 1986, the company was sold by its 35 partners to The Travelers Companies for $157.5 million, which was initiated when the Bechtel family cashed out its 30% holding in February, forcing the partnership to sell to Travelers to increase their pool of capital which had been depleted by $25 million.

The corporate office was located at 535 Madison Ave in New York City. The downtown office was located at 120 Wall street in New York City.

=== Barings and Swiss Bank ===
In 1991, the company was sold to Barings for $122 million. Barings went bankrupt and in 1995, management bought back the firm.

In 1997, the company was sold to Swiss Bank Corporation in 1997 and merged with S. G. Warburg & Co., to become Warburg Dillon Read.

In 1998, it became part of UBS when Swiss Bank Corporation merged with Union Bank of Switzerland to become UBS.

=== Dillon Read Capital Management ===
In June 2005, UBS established Dillon Read Capital Management (DRCM), led by former UBS Investment Bank head John P. Costas.

On May 3, 2007, UBS announced the closure of Dillon Read Capital Management. After profits of $1.2 billion in 2006, the division lost 150 million Swiss Francs in the first quarter of 2007, primarily due to bets on the sub-prime mortgage industry in the United States. The assets under management were transferred into UBS's main asset management business. The division had raised $1.2 billion in assets under management.

In her 2008 book, UBS: les dessous d'un scandale, Myret Zaki asserted that had UBS listened to Dillon Read Management, UBS could have limited its losses from the subprime mortgage crisis to $500 million instead of $40 billion.
