= Sands Ring Homestead Museum =

Historic house in New York, United States

- Sands-Ring Homestead
- U.S. National Register of Historic Places
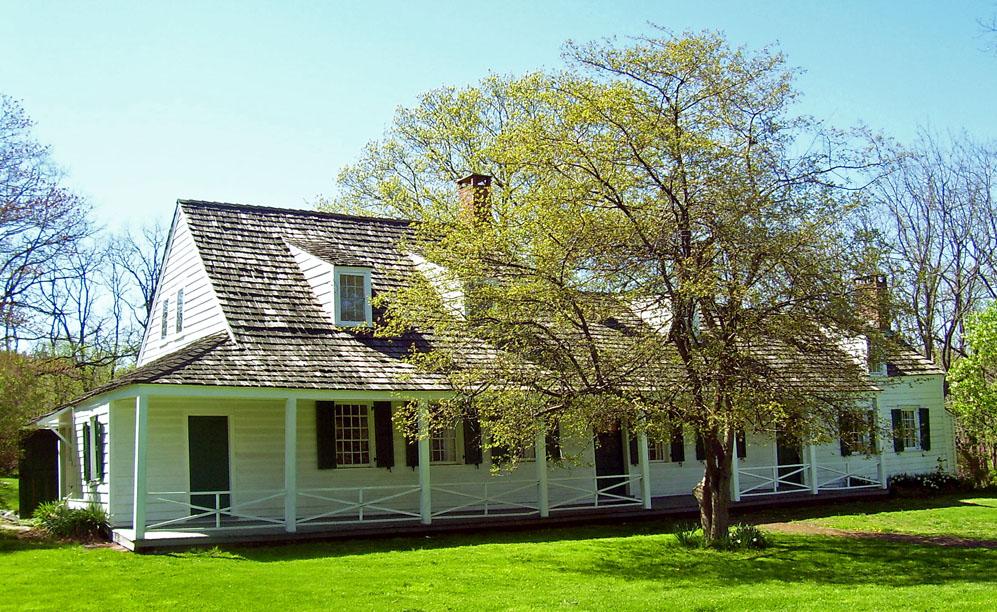
- The house in 2007

- Location within New York Location within the United States
- Location: Main St., Cornwall, NY
- Nearest city: Newburgh
- Coordinates: 41°26′27″N 74°01′45″W
- Area: 3 acres (1.2 ha)
- Built: c. 1760
- MPS: Cornwall MPS
- NRHP reference No.: 96000150
- Added to NRHP: March 8, 1996

The Sands Ring Homestead Museum is a historic house located on Main Street in the Town of Cornwall, in Orange County, New York. It was built in 1760 by Nathaniel Sands for his cousin Comfort Sands. Comfort's wife, however, did not want to leave her home on Long Island, so Nathaniel and his family moved in. In 1777, Nathaniel gave the house as a wedding present to his son David and his bride Clementine Hallock. David, a member of the Society of Friends, opened the house to the Quaker community as a meetinghouse until the Quaker Meeting House located at 60 Quaker Avenue opened in 1790. His son David established a store on the site. It was one of the first meeting places of the Cornwall Quakers. Today it is used as museum featuring Colonial-era activities.

It has been a Registered Historic Place since 1996.
