= 99th New York State Legislature =

New York state legislative session

←	98th	100th	→
- The Old State Capitol (1879)

Overview
- Legislative body: New York State Legislature
- Jurisdiction: New York, United States
- Term: January 1 – December 31, 1876

Senate
- Members: 32
- President: Lt. Gov. William Dorsheimer (D)
- Temporary President: William H. Robertson (R)
- Party control: Republican (20-12)

Assembly
- Members: 128
- Speaker: James W. Husted (R)
- Party control: Republican (72-56)

Sessions
- 1st: January 4 – May 3, 1876

The 99th New York State Legislature, consisting of the New York State Senate and the New York State Assembly, met from January 4 to May 3, 1876, during the second year of Samuel J. Tilden's governorship, in Albany.

== Background ==
Under the provisions of the New York Constitution of 1846, 32 Senators and 128 assemblymen were elected in single-seat districts; senators for a two-year term, assemblymen for a one-year term. The senatorial districts were made up of entire counties, except New York County (five districts) and Kings County (two districts). The Assembly districts were made up of entire towns, or city wards, forming a contiguous area, all within the same county.

At this time there were two major political parties: the Republican Party and the Democratic Party. The Prohibition Party also nominated a ticket.

== Elections ==
The 1875 New York state election was held on November 2. All seven statewide elective offices up for election were carried by the Democrats. The approximate party strength at this election, as expressed by the vote for Secretary of State, was: Democratic 390,000; Republican 375,000; and Prohibition 11,000.

== Sessions ==
The Legislature met for the regular session at the Old State Capitol in Albany on January 4, 1876; and adjourned on May 3.

James W. Husted (R) was elected Speaker against Richard U. Sherman (D).

William H. Robertson (R) was re-elected President pro tempore of the State Senate.

== State Senate ==
=== Districts ===
- 1st District: Queens, Richmond and Suffolk counties
- 2nd District: 1st, 2nd, 3rd, 4th, 5th, 7th, 11th, 13th, 15th, 19th and 20th wards of the City of Brooklyn
- 3rd District: 6th, 8th, 9th, 10th, 12th, 14th, 16th, 17th and 18th wards of the City of Brooklyn; and all towns in Kings County
- 4th District: 1st, 2nd, 3rd, 4th, 5th, 6th, 7th, 13th and 14th wards of New York City
- 5th District: 8th, 9th, 15th and 16th wards of New York City
- 6th District: 10th, 11th and 17th wards of New York City
- 7th District: 18th, 20th and 21st wards of New York City
- 8th District: 12th, 19th and 22nd wards of New York City
- 9th District: Putnam, Rockland and Westchester counties
- 10th District: Orange and Sullivan counties
- 11th District: Columbia and Dutchess counties
- 12th District: Rensselaer and Washington counties
- 13th District: Albany County
- 14th District: Greene and Ulster counties
- 15th District: Fulton, Hamilton, Montgomery, Saratoga and Schenectady counties
- 16th District: Clinton, Essex and Warren counties
- 17th District: Franklin and St. Lawrence counties
- 18th District: Jefferson and Lewis counties
- 19th District: Oneida County
- 20th District: Herkimer and Otsego counties
- 21st District: Madison and Oswego counties
- 22nd District: Onondaga and Cortland counties
- 23rd District: Chenango, Delaware and Schoharie counties
- 24th District: Broome, Tompkins and Tioga counties
- 25th District: Cayuga and Wayne counties
- 26th District: Ontario, Seneca and Yates counties
- 27th District: Chemung, Schuyler and Steuben counties
- 28th District: Monroe County
- 29th District: Genesee, Niagara and Orleans counties
- 30th District: Allegany, Livingston and Wyoming counties
- 31st District: Erie County
- 32nd District: Cattaraugus and Chautauqua counties
Note: There are now 62 counties in the State of New York. The counties which are not mentioned in this list had not yet been established, or sufficiently organized, the area being included in one or more of the abovementioned counties.

=== Senators ===
The asterisk (*) denotes members of the previous Legislature who continued in office as members of this Legislature. L. Bradford Prince, John R. Kennaday, Stephen H. Hammond and Commodore P. Vedder changed from the Assembly to the Senate.

Note: For brevity, the chairmanships omit the words "...the Committee on (the)..."

District	Senator	Party	Notes
1st	L. Bradford Prince*	Republican	Chairman of Privileges and Elections
2nd	John R. Kennaday*	Democrat	
3rd	John C. Jacobs*	Democrat	unsuccessfully contested by James Cavanagh (R)
4th	John Morrissey	Anti-Tam. Dem.	
5th	James W. Booth*	Republican	Chairman of Literature; died on September 14, 1876
6th	Caspar A. Baaden	Republican	Chairman of Public Expenditures
7th	James W. Gerard	Democrat	unsuccessfully contested by William Laimbeer Jr. (R)
8th	Francis M. Bixby	Anti-Tam. Dem.	
9th	William H. Robertson*	Republican	re-elected President pro tempore; Chairman of Judiciary
10th	Daniel B. St. John	Democrat	
11th	B. Platt Carpenter	Republican	Chairman of Retrenchment; and of Villages
12th	Thomas Coleman	Republican	Chairman of Banks; of Public Buildings; and of Grievances
13th	Hamilton Harris	Republican	Chairman of Finance; and of Joint Library
14th	Augustus Schoonmaker Jr.	Democrat	
15th	Webster Wagner*	Republican	Chairman of Public Printing
16th	Franklin W. Tobey*	Republican	Chairman of Insurance
17th	Darius A. Moore	Republican	Chairman of Claims; and of Agriculture
18th	James F. Starbuck	Democrat	
19th	Theodore S. Sayre	Republican	Chairman of Roads and Bridges; and of Salt
20th	David P. Loomis	Democrat	
21st	Benjamin Doolittle	Republican	Chairman of Manufactures
22nd	Dennis McCarthy	Republican	Chairman of Charitable and Religious Societies
23rd	William C. Lamont	Democrat	
24th	John H. Selkreg*	Republican	Chairman of Railroads; and of Poor Laws
25th	William B. Woodin*	Republican	Chairman of Cities; of Engrossed Bills; and of Rules
26th	Stephen H. Hammond*	Democrat	
27th	George B. Bradley*	Democrat	
28th	William N. Emerson	Republican	Chairman of Erection and Division of Towns and Counties; and of Public Health
29th	Dan H. Cole*	Republican	Chairman of Canals
30th	Abijah J. Wellman*	Republican	Chairman of Militia; and of State Prisons
31st	Sherman S. Rogers	Republican	took his seat on January 11; Chairman of Commerce and Navigation; resigned September 5, 1876 to run for Lieutenant Governor of New York
32nd	Commodore P. Vedder*	Republican	unsuccessfully contested by Judson W. Breed; Chairman of Indian Affairs; and of Internal Affairs of Towns and Counties

=== Employees ===
- Clerk: Henry A. Glidden
- Sergeant-at-Arms: John W. Corning
- Assistant Sergeant-at-Arms: James L. Hart
- Doorkeeper: Frederick M. Burton
- First Assistant Doorkeeper: Webster Howard
- Stenographer: Hudson C. Tanner
- Janitor and Keeper of the Senate Chamber: George A. Johnson
- Assistant Janitor and Keeper of the Senate Chamber: Robert McIntyre
- Assistant Postmaster: Henry L. Griswold, from January 6
- Chaplain: Ebenezer Halley

== State Assembly ==
=== Assemblymen ===
The asterisk (*) denotes members of the previous Legislature who continued as members of this Legislature.

District		Assemblymen	Party	Notes
Albany	1st	Peter Slingerland*	Republican	
Albany	2nd	Thomas D. Coleman	Democrat	
Albany	3rd	William J. Maher	Democrat	
Albany	4th	Alfred LeRoy	Republican	
Allegany		Sumner Baldwin	Republican	
Broome		Rodney A. Ford	Democrat	
Cattaraugus	1st	Harrison Cheney	Republican	
Cattaraugus	2nd	Edgar Shannon	Republican	
Cayuga	1st	George I. Post	Republican	
Cayuga	2nd	John S. Brown	Republican	
Chautauqua	1st	William H. Whitney	Democrat	
Chautauqua	2nd	Theodore A. Case	Republican	
Chemung		Edmund Miller	Democrat	
Chenango		Isaac Plumb	Republican	
Clinton		Shepard P. Bowen*	Republican	
Columbia	1st	George H. Power	Republican	
Columbia	2nd	John T. Hogeboom	Republican	
Cortland		Judson C. Nelson	Democrat	
Delaware	1st	George D. Wheeler	Republican	
Delaware	2nd	Isaac H. Maynard	Democrat	
Dutchess	1st	Thomas Hammond	Republican	
Dutchess	2nd	DeWitt Webb	Republican	
Erie	1st	Daniel Cruice	Republican	
Erie	2nd	William W. Lawson*	Republican	
Erie	3rd	Edward Gallagher*	Republican	
Erie	4th	Charles F. Tabor	Democrat	
Erie	5th	Bertrand Chaffee	Democrat	
Essex		William E. Calkins*	Republican	
Franklin		John I. Gilbert	Republican	
Fulton and Hamilton		John J. Hanson	Democrat	
Genesee		Newton H. Green*	Republican	
Greene		Burton G. Morss	Democrat	
Herkimer		Myron A. McKee	Republican	
Jefferson	1st	Lotus Ingalls	Republican	
Jefferson	2nd	Lansing Becker	Democrat	
Kings	1st	Daniel Bradley*	Democrat	
Kings	2nd	Jonathan Ogden	Republican	
Kings	3rd	Michael J. Coffey*	Democrat	
Kings	4th	Tunis V. P. Talmage*	Democrat	
Kings	5th	Albion P. Higgins	Republican	
Kings	6th	Jacob Worth*	Republican	
Kings	7th	Charles L. Lyon	Democrat	
Kings	8th	Adrian M. Suydam	Republican	
Kings	9th	John McGroarty*	Democrat	
Lewis		Alexander H. Crosby	Democrat	
Livingston		James Faulkner Jr.*	Democrat	
Madison	1st	Morris N. Campbell	Republican	
Madison	2nd	Fred C. Fiske	Republican	
Monroe	1st	Willard Hodges	Republican	
Monroe	2nd	James S. Graham	Republican	
Monroe	3rd	Heman Glass	Republican	
Montgomery		George M. Voorhees	Democrat	
New York	1st	Nicholas Muller*	Democrat	on November 7, 1876, elected to the 45th U.S. Congress
New York	2nd	Felix Murphy	Anti-Tam. Dem.	
New York	3rd	James J. Slevin	Democrat	
New York	4th	John Galvin	Democrat	
New York	5th	George W. Betts	Republican	
New York	6th	Matthew Patten	Democrat	
New York	7th	Isaac Israel Hayes	Republican	
New York	8th	Frederick Gugel Jr.	Republican	
New York	9th	Andrew J. Campbell	Republican	
New York	10th	Joseph Hoffman Jr.	Republican	
New York	11th	Charles A. Peabody Jr.	Republican	
New York	12th	Archibald Watts	Republican	
New York	13th	Robert H. Strahan	Republican	previously a member from Orange Co.
New York	14th	P. J. Carty	Anti-Tam. Dem.	
New York	15th	M. P. Killian	Democrat	
New York	16th	George Y. Whitson	Anti-Tam. Dem.	
New York	17th	William T. Graff	Republican	
New York	18th	Stephen J. O'Hare	Democrat	
New York	19th	James T. King	Democrat	
New York	20th	I. A. Englehart	Republican	
New York	21st	Joseph P. Fallon	Democrat	
Niagara	1st	Amos A. Bissell	Democrat	
Niagara	2nd	Jonas W. Brown	Republican	
Oneida	1st	Richard U. Sherman*	Democrat	
Oneida	2nd	Sylvester Gridley	Republican	
Oneida	3rd	James H. Flanagan	Democrat	
Oneida	4th	Walter Ballou	Democrat	
Onondaga	1st	Allen Munroe	Republican	
Onondaga	2nd	Carroll E. Smith	Republican	
Onondaga	3rd	C. Fred Herbst	Republican	
Ontario	1st	Seth Stanley	Democrat	
Ontario	2nd	Hiram Maxfield	Democrat	
Orange	1st	Thomas W. Bradley	Republican	
Orange	2nd	John H. Reeve	Democrat	
Orleans		Joseph Drake Billings	Republican	
Oswego	1st	George B. Sloan	Republican	elected Speaker pro tempore
Oswego	2nd	Thomas W. Green	Republican	
Oswego	3rd	John Preston	Republican	
Otsego	1st	James S. Davenport	Democrat	
Otsego	2nd	George Scramling	Democrat	
Putnam		Hamilton Fish II	Republican	
Queens	1st	Townsend D. Cock	Democrat	
Queens	2nd	Alvan T. Payne	Democrat	
Rensselaer	1st	William V. Cleary*	Democrat	
Rensselaer	2nd	William F. Taylor*	Republican	
Rensselaer	3rd	Thomas B. Simmons	Republican	
Richmond		Kneeland S. Townsend	Republican	
Rockland		George W. Weiant	Democrat	
St. Lawrence	1st	David McFalls	Republican	
St. Lawrence	2nd	A. Barton Hepburn*	Republican	
St. Lawrence	3rd	Lewis C. Lang	Republican	
Saratoga	1st	George West*	Republican	
Saratoga	2nd	Isaac Noyes Jr.	Republican	
Schenectady		Emmett O'Neill	Republican	
Schoharie		John M. Roscoe*	Democrat	
Schuyler		William Gulick	Republican	
Seneca		Lewis Post	Democrat	
Steuben	1st	William B. Ruggles	Democrat	
Steuben	2nd	Jerry E. B. Santee	Republican	
Suffolk		Samuel B. Gardiner	Democrat	
Sullivan		Adolphus E. Wenzel*	Democrat	
Tioga		Eugene B. Gere	Republican	
Tompkins		Samuel D. Halliday	Democrat	
Ulster	1st	Thomas Hamilton	Democrat	
Ulster	2nd	Jacob D. Wurts*	Democrat	
Ulster	3rd	Davis Winne	Democrat	
Warren		Robert Waddell	Republican	
Washington	1st	Townsend J. Potter	Republican	
Washington	2nd	Henry G. Burleigh	Republican	
Wayne	1st	Emory W. Gurnee	Democrat	
Wayne	2nd	Allen S. Russell*	Republican	
Westchester	1st	George H. Forster	Republican	
Westchester	2nd	Charles M. Schieffelin*	Democrat	
Westchester	3rd	James W. Husted*	Republican	elected Speaker
Wyoming		Arthur Clark	Republican	
Yates		John Southerland	Democrat	

=== Employees ===
- Clerk: Edward M. Johnson
- Sergeant-at-Arms: George A. Goss
- Doorkeeper: Eugene L. Demers
- Stenographer: Worden E. Payne

== Sources ==
- Civil List and Constitutional History of the Colony and State of New York compiled by Edgar Albert Werner (1884; see pg. 276 for Senate districts; pg. 291 for senators; pg. 298–304 for Assembly districts; and pg. 375f for assemblymen)
- Tribune Almanac for 1876
- Journal of the Senate (99th Session) (1876)
- ASSEMBLY CAUCUSES in NYT on January 4, 1876
- THE LEGISLATURE in Corning Journal on January 6, 1876
- THE COUNTY TICKET in NYT on October 30, 1875 [gives sketches of the Republican Assembly nominees in NYC]
