= 100th New York State Legislature =

New York state legislative session

←	99th	101st	→
- The Old State Capitol (1879)

Overview
- Legislative body: New York State Legislature
- Jurisdiction: New York, United States
- Term: January 1 – December 31, 1877

Senate
- Members: 32
- President: Lt. Gov. William Dorsheimer (D)
- Temporary President: William H. Robertson (R)
- Party control: Republican (19-13)

Assembly
- Members: 128
- Speaker: George B. Sloan (R)
- Party control: Republican (71-57)

Sessions
- 1st: January 2 – May 24, 1877

The 100th New York State Legislature, consisting of the New York State Senate and the New York State Assembly, met from January 2 to May 24, 1877, during the first year of Lucius Robinson's governorship, in Albany.

== Background ==
Under the provisions of the New York Constitution of 1846, 32 Senators and 128 assemblymen were elected in single-seat districts; senators for a two-year term, assemblymen for a one-year term. The senatorial districts were made up of entire counties, except New York County (five districts) and Kings County (two districts). The Assembly districts were made up of entire towns, or city wards, forming a contiguous area, all within the same county.

At this time there were two major political parties: the Republican Party and the Democratic Party. The Prohibition Party and the Greenback Party also nominated tickets.

== Elections ==
The 1876 New York state election was held on November 7. The Democratic incumbent State Comptroller Lucius Robinson was elected Governor, and his running mate William Dorsheimer was re-elected Lieutenant Governor. The other three statewide elective offices up for election were also carried by the Democrats. The approximate party strength at this election, as expressed by the vote for Governor, was: Democratic 520,000; Republican 489,000; Prohibition 3,400; and Greenback 1,400.

== Sessions ==
The Legislature met for the regular session at the Old State Capitol in Albany on January 2, 1877; and adjourned on May 24.

George B. Sloan (R) was elected Speaker with 69 votes against 57 for Luke F. Cozans (D).

On April 3, the Legislature re-elected Superintendent of Public Instruction Neil Gilmour to a term of three years.

The Senate met for a special session at Saratoga Springs and adjourned on August 18.

On August 17, Superintendent of the New York State Banking Department DeWitt C. Ellis was removed from office.

== State Senate ==
=== Districts ===
- 1st District: Queens, Richmond and Suffolk counties
- 2nd District: 1st, 2nd, 3rd, 4th, 5th, 7th, 11th, 13th, 15th, 19th and 20th wards of the City of Brooklyn
- 3rd District: 6th, 8th, 9th, 10th, 12th, 14th, 16th, 17th and 18th wards of the City of Brooklyn; and all towns in Kings County
- 4th District: 1st, 2nd, 3rd, 4th, 5th, 6th, 7th, 13th and 14th wards of New York City
- 5th District: 8th, 9th, 15th and 16th wards of New York City
- 6th District: 10th, 11th and 17th wards of New York City
- 7th District: 18th, 20th and 21st wards of New York City
- 8th District: 12th, 19th and 22nd wards of New York City
- 9th District: Putnam, Rockland and Westchester counties
- 10th District: Orange and Sullivan counties
- 11th District: Columbia and Dutchess counties
- 12th District: Rensselaer and Washington counties
- 13th District: Albany County
- 14th District: Greene and Ulster counties
- 15th District: Fulton, Hamilton, Montgomery, Saratoga and Schenectady counties
- 16th District: Clinton, Essex and Warren counties
- 17th District: Franklin and St. Lawrence counties
- 18th District: Jefferson and Lewis counties
- 19th District: Oneida County
- 20th District: Herkimer and Otsego counties
- 21st District: Madison and Oswego counties
- 22nd District: Onondaga and Cortland counties
- 23rd District: Chenango, Delaware and Schoharie counties
- 24th District: Broome, Tompkins and Tioga counties
- 25th District: Cayuga and Wayne counties
- 26th District: Ontario, Seneca and Yates counties
- 27th District: Chemung, Schuyler and Steuben counties
- 28th District: Monroe County
- 29th District: Genesee, Niagara and Orleans counties
- 30th District: Allegany, Livingston and Wyoming counties
- 31st District: Erie County
- 32nd District: Cattaraugus and Chautauqua counties

Note: There are now 62 counties in the State of New York. The counties which are not mentioned in this list had not yet been established, or sufficiently organized, the area being included in one or more of the abovementioned counties.

=== Members ===
The asterisk (*) denotes members of the previous Legislature who continued in office as members of this Legislature.

District	Senator	Party	Notes
1st	L. Bradford Prince*	Republican	
2nd	John R. Kennaday*	Democrat	
3rd	John C. Jacobs*	Democrat	
4th	John Morrissey*	Anti-Tam. Dem.	
5th	Alfred Wagstaff Jr.	Democrat	elected to fill vacancy, in place of James W. Booth
6th	Caspar A. Baaden*	Republican	
7th	James W. Gerard Jr.*	Democrat	
8th	Francis M. Bixby*	Anti-Tam. Dem.	
9th	William H. Robertson*	Republican	President pro tempore
10th	Daniel B. St. John*	Democrat	
11th	B. Platt Carpenter*	Republican	
12th	Thomas Coleman*	Republican	
13th	Hamilton Harris*	Republican	
14th	Augustus Schoonmaker Jr.*	Democrat	on November 6, 1877, elected New York Attorney General
15th	Webster Wagner*	Republican	
16th	Franklin W. Tobey*	Republican	
17th	Darius A. Moore*	Republican	
18th	James F. Starbuck*	Democrat	
19th	Theodore S. Sayre*	Republican	
20th	David P. Loomis*	Democrat	
21st	Benjamin Doolittle*	Republican	
22nd	Dennis McCarthy*	Republican	
23rd	William C. Lamont*	Democrat	
24th	John H. Selkreg*	Republican	
25th	William B. Woodin*	Republican	
26th	Stephen H. Hammond*	Democrat	
27th	George B. Bradley*	Democrat	
28th	William N. Emerson*	Republican	
29th	Dan H. Cole*	Republican	
30th	Abijah J. Wellman*	Republican	
31st	E. Carleton Sprague	Republican	elected to fill vacancy, in place of Sherman S. Rogers
32nd	Commodore P. Vedder*	Republican	

=== Employees ===
- Clerk: Henry A. Glidden
- Sergeant-at-Arms: John W. Corning
- Assistant Sergeant-at-Arms: James L. Hart
- Doorkeeper: Frederick M. Burton
- First Assistant Doorkeeper: Webster Howard
- Stenographer: Hudson C. Tanner
- Janitor and Keeper of the Senate Chamber: George A. Johnson
- Assistant Janitor and Keeper of the Senate Chamber: Robert McIntyre
- Assistant Postmaster: Henry L. Griswold
- Chaplain: Ebenezer Halley

== State Assembly ==
=== Assemblymen ===
The asterisk (*) denotes members of the previous Legislature who continued as members of this Legislature.

Party affiliations follow the vote for Speaker.

District		Assemblymen	Party	Notes
Albany	1st	John Sager	Democrat	
Albany	2nd	Jonathan R. Herrick	Democrat	
Albany	3rd	William J. Maher*	Democrat	
Albany	4th	Edward Curran	Democrat	contested; seat vacated on February 27
Albany	4th	Waters W. Braman	Republican	seated on February 27
Allegany		Sumner Baldwin*	Republican	
Broome		Edwin C. Moody	Republican	
Cattaraugus	1st	Thomas J. King	Republican	
Cattaraugus	2nd	Edgar Shannon*	Republican	
Cayuga	1st	George I. Post*	Republican	
Cayuga	2nd	John S. Brown*	Republican	
Chautauqua	1st	Sherman Williams	Republican	
Chautauqua	2nd	Theodore A. Case*	Republican	
Chemung		Hosea H. Rockwell	Democrat	
Chenango		J. Hudson Skillman	Republican	
Clinton		Shepard P. Bowen*	Republican	
Columbia	1st	Jacob H. Proper	Democrat	
Columbia	2nd	John T. Hogeboom*	Republican	
Cortland		Deloss McGraw	Republican	
Delaware	1st	William J. Welsh	Republican	
Delaware	2nd	Isaac H. Maynard*	Democrat	
Dutchess	1st	Thomas Hammond*	Republican	
Dutchess	2nd	DeWitt Webb*	Republican	
Erie	1st	John L. Crowley	Democrat	
Erie	2nd	John G. Langner	Democrat	
Erie	3rd	Edward Gallagher*	Republican	
Erie	4th	Charles F. Tabor*	Democrat	
Erie	5th	Charles A. Orr	Republican	
Essex		Benjamin D. Clapp	Republican	
Franklin		John I. Gilbert*	Republican	
Fulton and Hamilton		George W. Fay	Republican	
Genesee		Eli Taylor	Republican	
Greene		Oscar T. Humphrey	Democrat	
Herkimer		Myron A. McKee*	Republican	
Jefferson	1st	Charles R. Skinner	Republican	
Jefferson	2nd	Henry Spicer	Republican	
Kings	1st	Daniel Bradley*	Ind. Dem.	
Kings	2nd	Richard Marvin	Republican	
Kings	3rd	John Shanley	Democrat	
Kings	4th	James G. Tighe	Democrat	
Kings	5th	William W. Stephenson	Republican	
Kings	6th	John A. Dillmeier	Democrat	
Kings	7th	Charles L. Lyon*	Democrat	
Kings	8th	Adrian M. Suydam*	Republican	
Kings	9th	John McGroarty*	Democrat	
Lewis		William W. Rice	Democrat	
Livingston		Jonathan B. Morey	Republican	
Madison	1st	Albert N. Sheldon	Republican	
Madison	2nd	Merchant Billington	Republican	
Monroe	1st	Willard Hodges*	Republican	
Monroe	2nd	James S. Graham*	Republican	
Monroe	3rd	Washington L. Rockwell	Democrat	
Montgomery		Edward Wemple	Democrat	
New York	1st	James Healey	Democrat	death announced January 23
New York	1st	John F. Berrigan	Democrat	elected to fill vacancy, seated on February 27
New York	2nd	Thomas F. Grady	Democrat	
New York	3rd	William H. Rooney	Democrat	
New York	4th	John Galvin*	Democrat	
New York	5th	Peter Mitchell	Democrat	
New York	6th	Michael Healy	Democrat	
New York	7th	Isaac Israel Hayes*	Republican	
New York	8th	Martin Nachtmann	Democrat	
New York	9th	William H. Corsa	Republican	
New York	10th	Christopher Flecke	Democrat	
New York	11th	Elliot C. Cowdin	Republican	
New York	12th	Maurice F. Holahan	Democrat	
New York	13th	Robert H. Strahan*	Republican	
New York	14th	Luke F. Cozans	Democrat	
New York	15th	James G. Dimond	Democrat	
New York	16th	Francis B. Spinola	Democrat	
New York	17th	James E. Coulter	Democrat	
New York	18th	Stephen J. O'Hare*	Democrat	
New York	19th	Thomas C. E. Ecclesine	Democrat	
New York	20th	Joseph I. Stein	Democrat	
New York	21st	J. C. Julius Langbein	Republican	
Niagara	1st	Amos A. Bissell*	Democrat	
Niagara	2nd	Sherburne B. Piper	Democrat	
Oneida	1st	James Corbett	Republican	
Oneida	2nd	Everett Case	Republican	
Oneida	3rd	Benjamin D. Stone	Democrat	
Oneida	4th	J. Robert Moore	Republican	
Onondaga	1st	Thomas G. Alvord	Republican	
Onondaga	2nd	Carroll E. Smith*	Republican	
Onondaga	3rd	C. Fred Herbst*	Republican	
Ontario	1st	Dwight B. Backenstose	Republican	
Ontario	2nd	Amasa T. Winch	Republican	
Orange	1st	James G. Graham	Republican	
Orange	2nd	Stewart Terry Durland	Democrat	died on January 17 of pneumonia at the home of his brother, former Assemblyman Daniel T. Durland, in Middletown, NY. His brother Daniel then died three days later of heart disease.
Orange	2nd	John V. D. Benedict	Democrat	elected to fill vacancy, seated on February 27
Orleans		Joseph Drake Billings*	Republican	
Oswego	1st	George B. Sloan*	Republican	elected Speaker
Oswego	2nd	George M. Case	Republican	
Oswego	3rd	DeWitt C. Peck	Republican	
Otsego	1st	James S. Davenport*	Democrat	
Otsego	2nd	Simeon R. Barnes	Republican	
Putnam		Hamilton Fish II*	Republican	
Queens	1st	Elbert Floyd-Jones	Democrat	
Queens	2nd	George E. Bulmer	Democrat	
Rensselaer	1st	John H. Burns	Democrat	
Rensselaer	2nd	John J. Filkin	Republican	
Rensselaer	3rd	William H. Sliter	Democrat	
Richmond		Samuel R. Brick	Democrat	
Rockland		George W. Weiant*	Democrat	
St. Lawrence	1st	David McFalls*	Republican	
St. Lawrence	2nd	A. Barton Hepburn*	Republican	
St. Lawrence	3rd	Lewis C. Lang*	Republican	
Saratoga	1st	George W. Neilson	Democrat	
Saratoga	2nd	Isaac Noyes Jr.*	Republican	
Schenectady		Walter T. L. Sanders	Democrat	
Schoharie		James H. Brown	Democrat	
Schuyler		William Gulick*	Republican	
Seneca		Albert L. Childs	Democrat	
Steuben	1st	William B. Ruggles*	Democrat	
Steuben	2nd	Jerry E. B. Santee*	Republican	
Suffolk		Francis Brill	Democrat	
Sullivan		Thornton A. Niven	Democrat	
Tioga		Eugene B. Gere*	Republican	
Tompkins		Silas R. Wickes	Republican	
Ulster	1st	Thomas Hamilton*	Democrat	
Ulster	2nd	Nathan Keator	Republican	
Ulster	3rd	Isaac W. Longyear	Democrat	
Warren		Robert Waddell*	Republican	
Washington	1st	Townsend J. Potter*	Republican	
Washington	2nd	Isaac V. Baker Jr.	Republican	
Wayne	1st	Jackson Valentine	Republican	
Wayne	2nd	Jeremiah Thistlethwaite	Republican	
Westchester	1st	Ambrose H. Purdy	Democrat	
Westchester	2nd	William F. Moller	Democrat	
Westchester	3rd	James W. Husted*	Republican	
Wyoming		Arthur Clark*	Republican	
Yates		Mason L. Baldwin	Republican	

=== Employees ===
- Clerk: Edward M. Johnson
- Sergeant-at-Arms: George A. Goss
- Doorkeeper: Eugene L. Demers
- Assistant Doorkeeper: Francis Strickland
- Assistant Doorkeeper: Michael Maher
- Stenographer: Worden E. Payne
- Superintendent of Documents: DeWitt Griffin

== Sources ==
- Civil List and Constitutional History of the Colony and State of New York compiled by Edgar Albert Werner (1884; see pg. 276 for Senate districts; pg. 291 for senators; pg. 298–304 for Assembly districts; and pg. 376f for assemblymen)
- OUR STATE GOVERNMENT in Newark Union on November 18, 1876
- MR. SPEAKER SLOAN in NYT on January 2, 1877
- The Legislature in The Madison Observer on January 10, 1877
- Journal of the Assembly (100th Session) (1877)
