= John McGroarty =

John McGroarty may refer to:

- John S. McGroarty, poet, columnist and politician from California
- John McGroarty (New York politician)
