= List of Omega Psi Phi members =

Omega Psi Phi is an historically African Amercan college fraternity that was founded on November 17, 1911, at Howard University. Following is a list of some of the notable memeber of Omega Psi Phi. commonly referred to as Omegas or Ques. The list includes initiated and honorary members of the fraternity.

== Arts ==
Name	Original chapter	Notability	Ref.
Count Basie	Xi Phi (Honorary)	Famous American Jazz Bandleader	
Sterling Allen Brown	Gamma	Poet, author, writer, and professor emeritus at Howard University	
Roland Hayes	Gamma (Honorary)	Internationally known tenor and orator.	
Langston Hughes	Beta	Poet	
Benjamin Mays	Gamma	Presidential advisor, author, mentor to MLK	
Max Roach	Grand Chapter (Special Intake)	Internationally known jazz drummer and improvisationalist.	

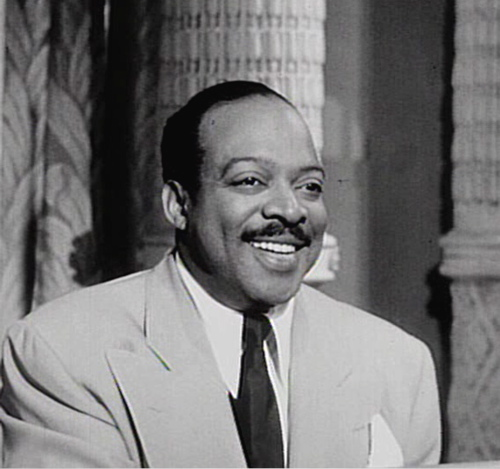
Count Basie

== Business ==
Name	Original chapter	Notability	Ref.
Earl Graves Sr.	Pi	Founder of Black Enterprise Magazine	
John Wesley Cromwell Jr.		First Black certified public accountant (CPA) in the United States	
Jesse Hill		CEO of Atlanta Life Insurance Company from 1973 to 1992	

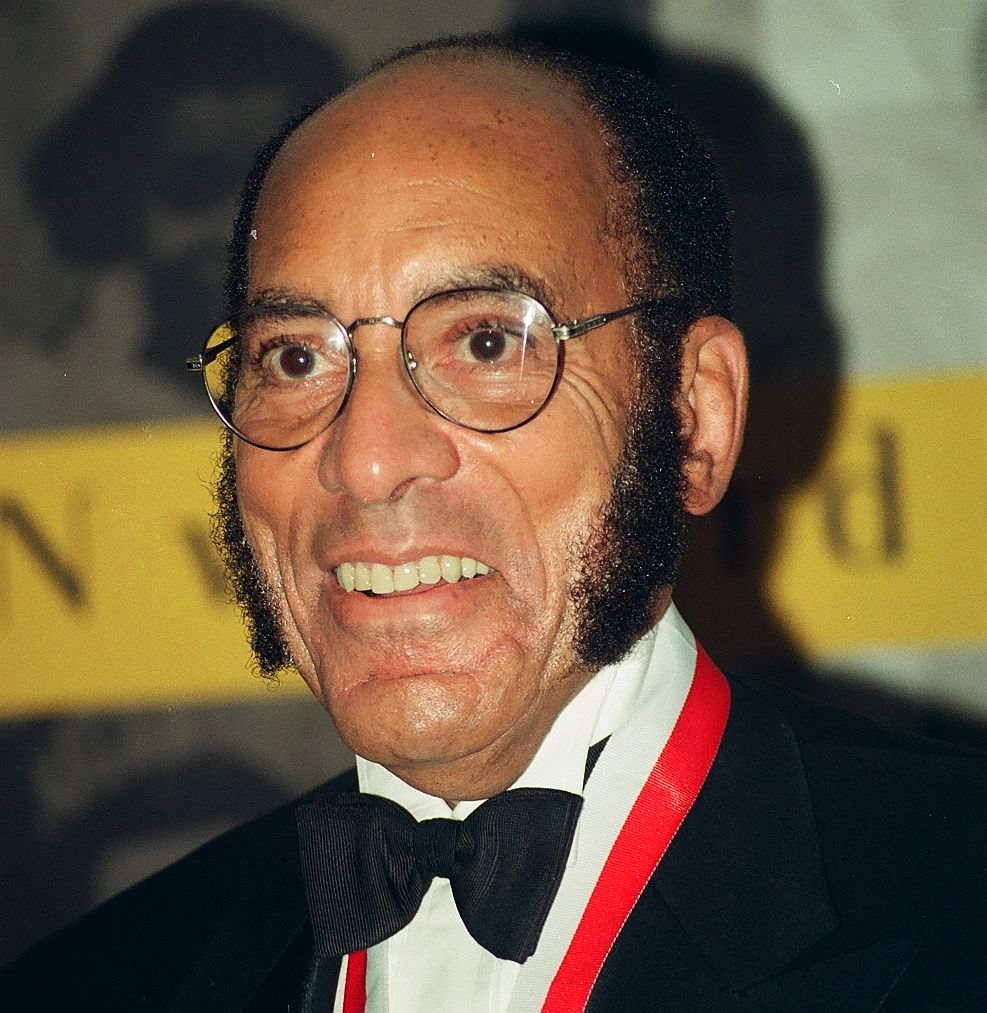
Earl Graves Sr.

== College presidents ==
Name	Original chapter	Notability	Ref.
Reginal S. Avery	Nu Psi	Coppin State University	
David Beckley		Rust College and Wiley College	
Billy C. Black	Chi Epsilon	Albany State College	
Ernest A. Boykins Jr.		former President of Mississippi Valley State University (1971–1981)	
Jerryl Briggs		current President of Mississippi Valley State University (2017–present)	
Micky L. Burnim	Phi Gamma (Charter Line 1968)	former president of Bowie State University	
Luther Burse Sr.	Psi Psi	Fort Valley State University, 1983–1991	
William B. Bynum Jr.		Jackson State University (2017–2020)	
Nathaniel Glover	Chi	Edward Waters College	
Alexander Conyers	Xi Psi	South Carolina State University, 2021–Present	
Samuel DuBois Cook	Psi	Dillard University, 1974–1997	
Lawrence A. Davis	Tau Sigma	University of Arkansas at Pine Bluff	
Walter S. Davis	Rho Psi, founder	Tennessee State University	
Albert W. Dent	Psi	Dillard University, 1941–1969	
William E. Gardner Jr.		former president of Savannah State College (1989–1991)	
William Hamilton Harris		Alabama State University	
William Jasper Hale	Rho Psi, founder	Tennessee State University	
William R. Harvey	Gamma Psi	Hampton University	
Billy C. Hawkins		Texas College, Talladega College	
James A. Hefner	Chi Omega (1965)	Tennessee State University	
Andrew Hugine Jr.	Xi Psi	former president of South Carolina State University(2003–2007), current President of Alabama Agricultural and Mechanical University (A&M University or AAMU) 2009– present	
Jimmy R Jenkins	Lambda Gamma	Livingstone College	
Samuel D. Jolley Jr.	Upsilon Sigma	Morris Brown College	
Joseph Jones	Pi Sigma	Arkansas Baptist College	
Willie D. Larkin	Iota Omega	Grambling State University	
James E. Lyons	Upsilon Epsilon	Jackson State University	
Roderick McDavis	Sigma Psi (Charter Member)	Ohio University	
Walter E. Massey	Psi	President of the School of the Art Institute of Chicago, 2010–2016; ninth president of Morehouse College, 1995–2007	
Benjamin Mays	Gamma	Sixth president of Morehouse College, 1940–1967	
Eddie N. Moore	Nu	Virginia State University	
James Nabrit Jr.	Psi	Dean of Howard University School of Law, 1958–1960; Second Black president of Howard University, 1960–1965, 1968–1969	
Ivory V. Nelson		Central Washington University, Lincoln University, PA	
John A. Peoples	Upsilon Epsilon (Chapter Charter Member Fall 1948)	Jackson State University	
Nathaniel Pollard Jr.	Eta Sigma	Bowie State University	
Oscar Prater		Fort Valley State College	
Luns Richardson	Epsilon Epsilon Charter member	Morris College (President)	
John M. Rudley	Omega Epsilon	Texas Southern University (President 2008–2016, President Emeritus 2016–Present)	
Robert L. Satcher		Saint Paul's College	
Thomas H Scheer	Theta Phi	Kaplan College Jacksonville	
Albert Sloan		Miles College	
William W. Sutton	Theta Sigma	Mississippi Valley State University, 1988–1998	
H. Patrick Swygert	Alpha	Howard University	
Henry N. Tisdale	Lambda Sigma	Claflin University	

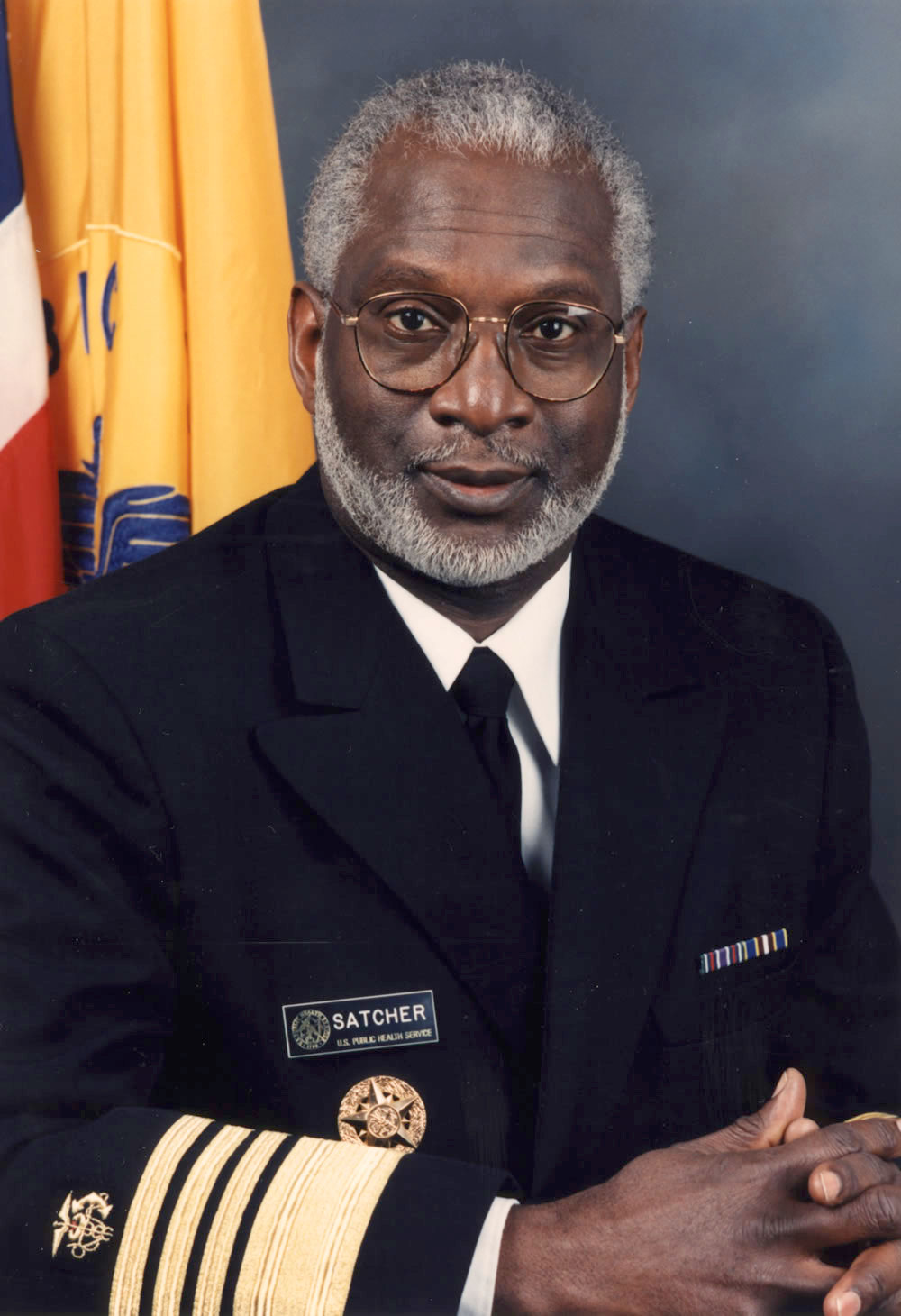
David Satcher

== Entertainment ==
Name	Original chapter	Notability	Ref.
A.J. Calloway	Tau Chi	Television Personality	
Bill Cosby	Beta Alpha Alpha	Comedian, actor	
Steve Harvey	Special Intake (Tau Tau)	Comedian and radio host	
James DuBose	Lamda Eta at Wake Forest University	Entertainment Executive and Television and Film Producer	
LaRoyce Hawkins	Pi Beta	Actor; mainly known for role on Chicago P.D.	
Jesse J. Holland	Eta Zeta	Author, television personality	
Terrence J	Mu Psi	Television Personality	
Lil' JJ	Alpha Delta Pi	Comedian, actor	
Tom Joyner	Lambda Epsilon	radio host	
Wanya Morris	Special Intake (Tau Tau)	member of R&B group Boyz II Men	
Rickey Smiley	Psi Rho	Comedian	
Doug Stewart	Xi Psi	Sports Radio/TV Personality (The 2 Live Stews)	
Ryan Stewart	Delta Kappa	Sports Radio/TV Personality (The 2 Live Stews)	
Joe Torry	Eta Sigma	Comedian	
Will Downing		Singer, songwriter	
Harry Lennix	Theta Kappa Kappa	Actor "The Blacklist"	
Shomari Love	Rho Lambda Lambda	Actor, Producer	

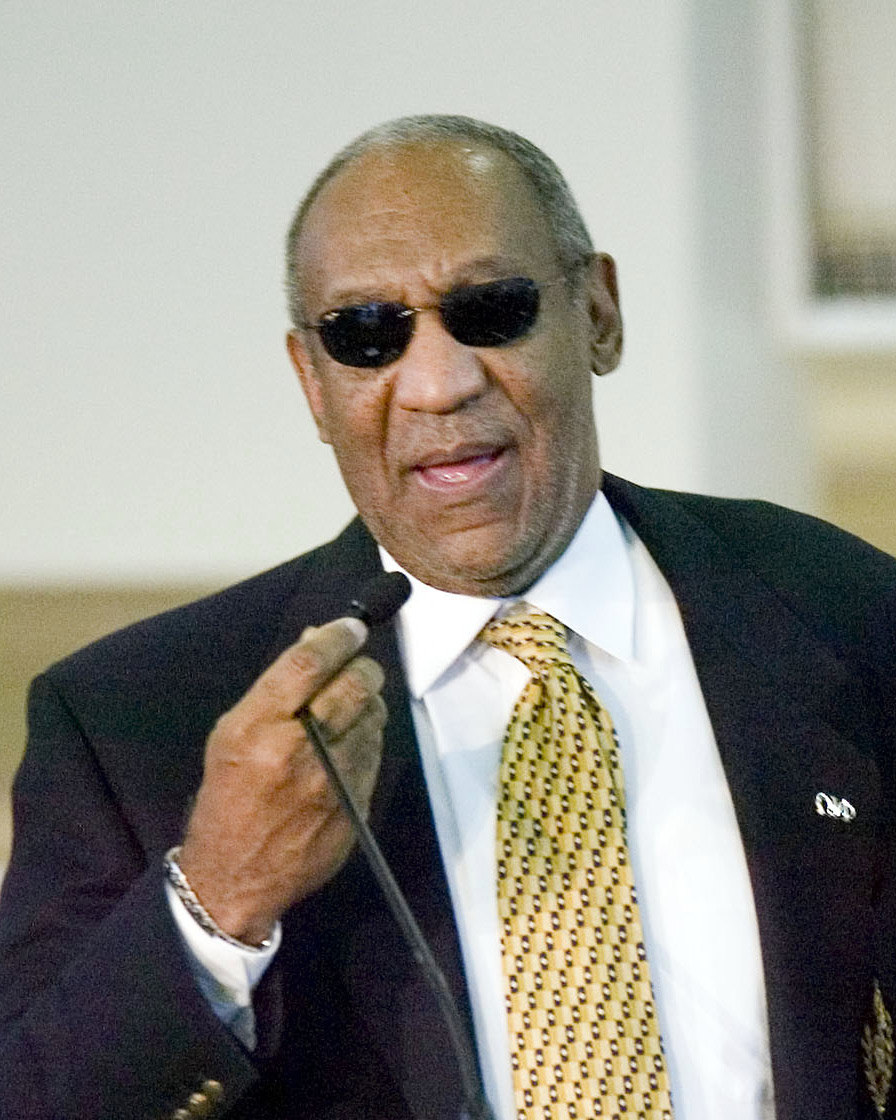
Bill Cosby

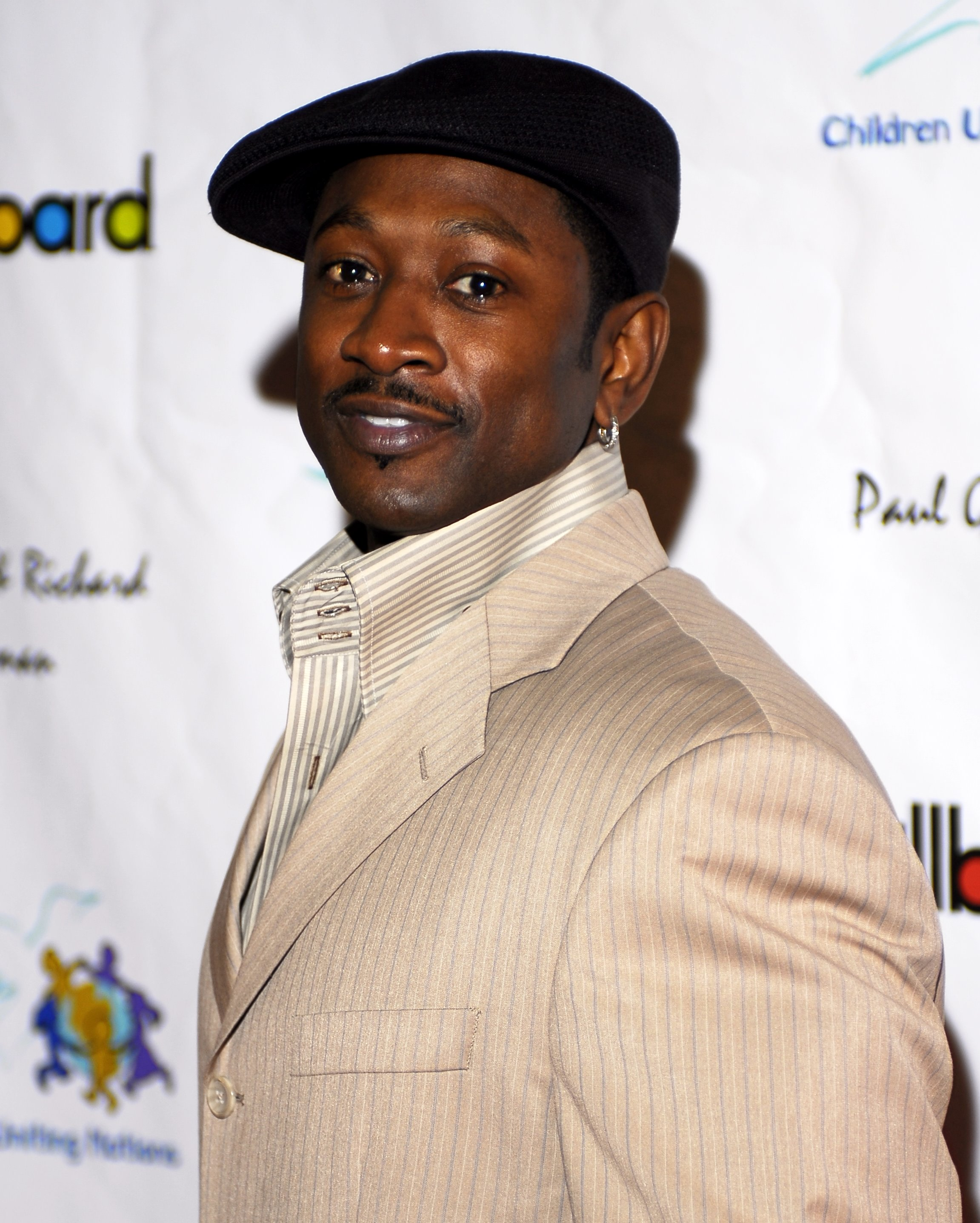
Joe Torry

== Military ==
Name	Original chapter	Notability	Ref.
Charles F. Bolden Jr.	Gamma Nu (1983)	USMC Major General, Astronaut; Current NASA Administrator	
Frederick D. Gregory	Alpha Omega	US Air Force Colonel, Astronaut, Former NASA Deputy Administrator	
Robert Henry Lawrence Jr.	Xi Epsilon	Major US Air Force, Fighter Pilot, Test Pilot, First Black Astronaut	
Roscoe Robinson Jr.	Upsilon Omega	First Black Four Star General – U.S. Army & 1st Black representative on the NATO Military Committee	
William E. Ward	Phi Nu	First Commander of US Africa Command	
Charles Young	Honorary Member (March 12, 1912)	Third Black West Point Graduate, Col. US Army, Buffalo Soldier	
Matthew A. Zimmerman	Theta Rho	First African American Chief of Chaplains – U.S. Army	

== Politics ==
Name	Original chapter	Notability	Ref.
Clifford Alexander Jr.		First African American Secretary of the Army	
Kam Buckner	Pi Psi	Illinois State Representative, Candidate for Mayor of Chicago, Illinois	
John Burton	Sigma Rho	First African-American mayor of Ypsilanti, Michigan	
Neil A. Butler	Beta Pi	First African-American mayor of Gainesville, Florida, since the Reconstruction era	
Jim Clyburn	Xi Psi	Congressman from South Carolina's 6th congressional district	
John P. Davis		Lawyer, Publisher, Civil rights activist	
Oliver Gilbert		Former Mayor of Miami Gardens, Commissioner of Miami-Dade County	
Roger Gregory	Upsilon Nu	Judge, United States Court of Appeals for the Fourth Circuit	
Nathan Hare	Phi Psi	The first coordinator of a black studies program; Founding publisher of The Black Scholar	
Peter C. Harvey	Pi	The first black to serve as the Attorney General of New Jersey	
William H. Hastie	Alpha Psi	First Governor of the U.S. Virgin Islands	
Benjamin Hooks	Epsilon Phi (1942)	Executive Director of NAACP, Civil Rights Activist, Minister	
Cliff Hayes Jr.	Pi Gamma	State Delegate representing 77th House District of Virginia Commonwealth of Virginia	
Jesse Jackson Jr.	Nu Pi Graduate Chapter Joliet, IL	Representative from Illinois	
Jesse Jackson	Pi Psi	Founder of the Rainbow/PUSH Coalition, Civil Rights Activist, Democratic Presidential Nominee, Minister	
Hank Johnson	Kappa Alpha Alpha	Representative from Georgia	
Rushern L. Baker III	Alpha	County Executive of Prince George's County	
Vernon Jordan Jr.	Zeta Phi		
Ronald N. Langston		National Director of the Minority Business Development Agency	
Clarence Lightner	Tau Psi	First popularly elected Mayor of Raleigh, North Carolina, and the first African American elected mayor of a metropolitan Southern city.	
Kendrick Meek	Upsilon Psi	Representative from Florida	
Kweisi Mfume	Grand Chapter (Special Intake)	Former President/CEO of NAACP, Congressman	
Michael R. Morgan	Omega Zeta (QZ)	Associate Justice -North Carolina Supreme Court	
Khalid Abdul Muhammad	Theta Sigma	National Representative for the Nation of Islam & National Chairman of the New Black Panther Party	
Adrian Perkins	Phi Nu	Mayor of Shreveport, Louisiana	
Graham T. Perry	Psi	Assistant Attorney General for the State of Illinois, candidate for municipal judge in Chicago	
Bayard Rustin	Upsilon	Leader in social movements for civil rights, socialism, pacifism and non-violence, and gay rights.	
David Satcher	Psi	Surgeon General of the United States	
Carl E. Stewart	Theta Sigma	Chief Judge, United States Fifth Circuit Court of Appeals	
Teddy B. Taylor	Gamma Pi	American diplomat	
Walter Washington	Alpha	First Home-Rule Mayor of the District of Columbia	
Robert C. Weaver	Eta	first United States Secretary of Housing and Urban Development (HUD)	
Togo West	Kappa Psi	Secretary of the Army and Secretary of Veterans Affairs	
James E. White	Prairie View Agricultural and Mechanical University	Republican member of the Texas House of Representatives from Tyler County	
Lawrence Douglas Wilder	Zeta	Governor of Virginia	
Roy Wilkins	Xi	President NAACP	
Benjie E. Wimberly	Nu Psi	Speaker pro tempore of the New Jersey General Assembly	

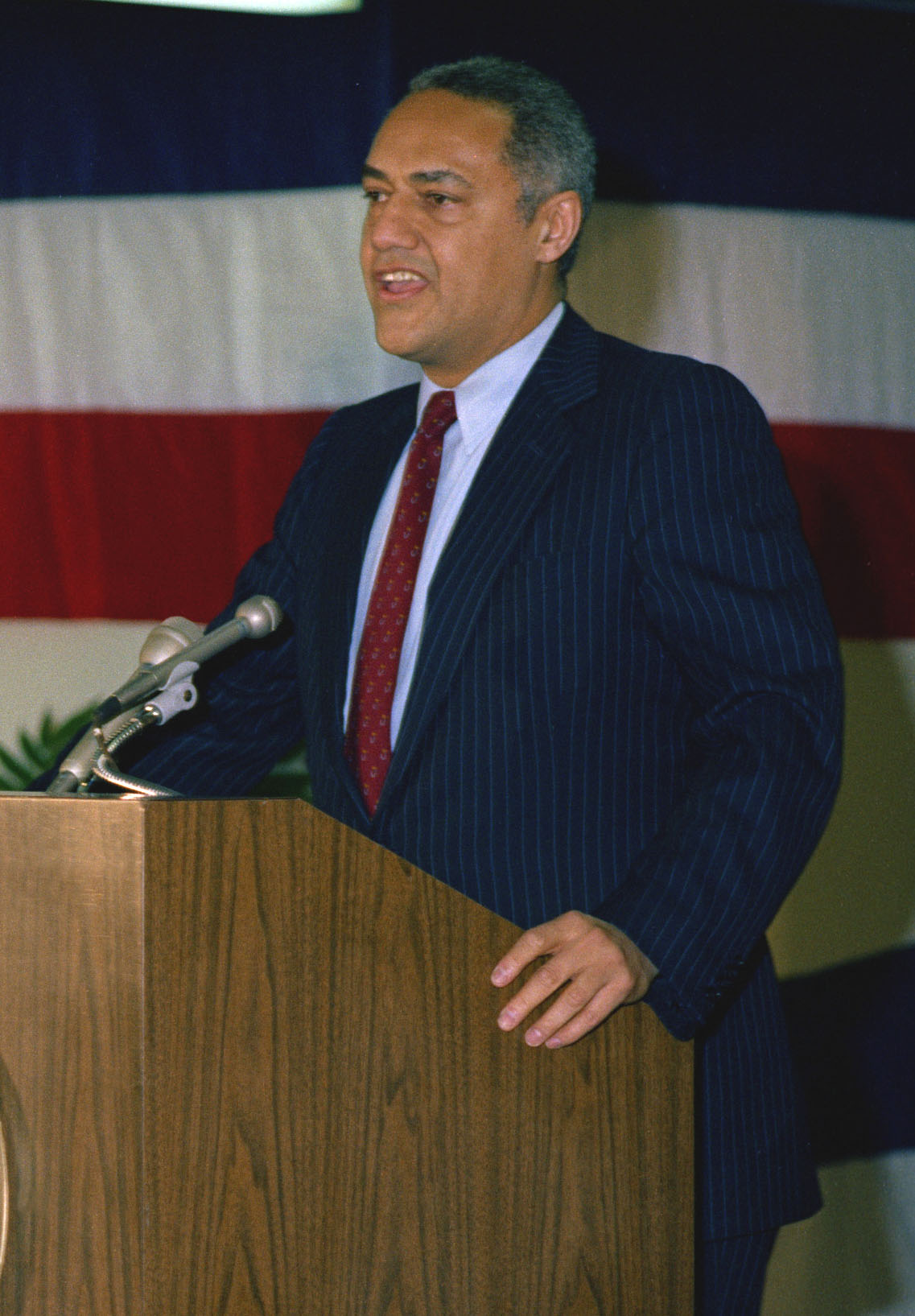
Clifford Alexander

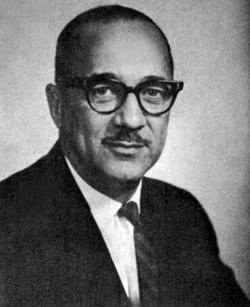
William Hastie

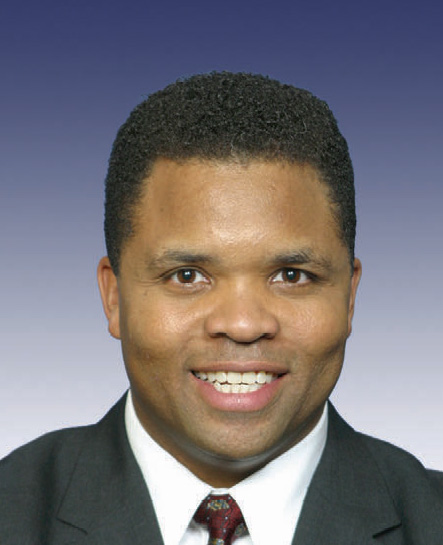
Jesse Jackson Jr.

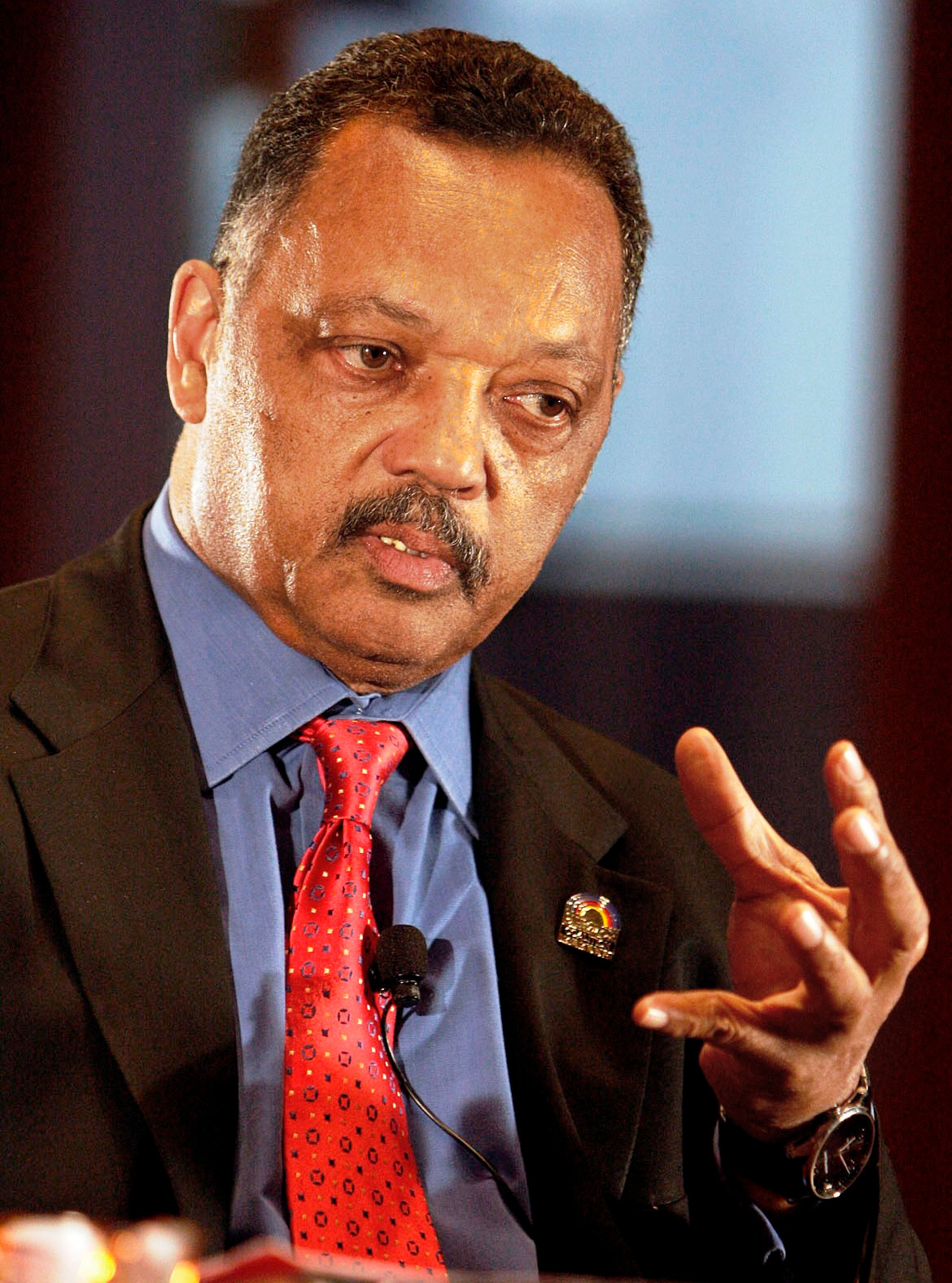
Jesse Jackson, Sr.

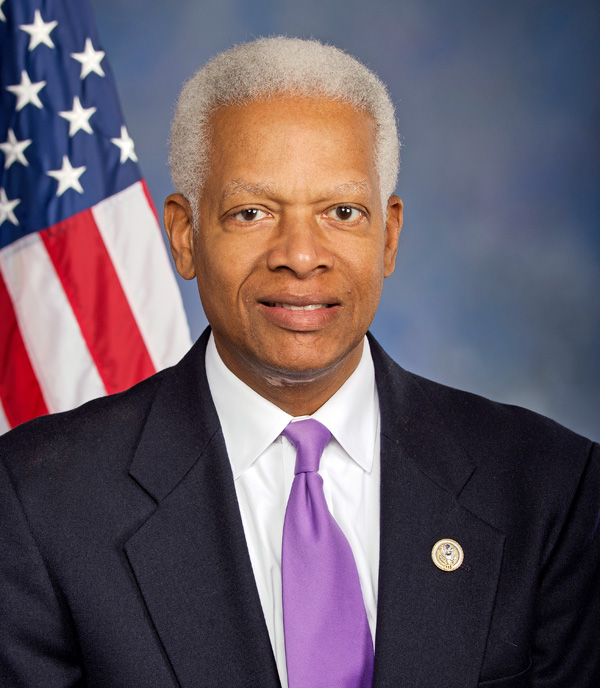
Hank Johnson

== Science ==
Name	Original chapter	Notability	Ref.
Charles Bolden	Gamma Nu	12th Administrator of the National Aeronautics and Space Administration (NASA) and 1st African American to lead NASA's Discovery joint space venture with the Soviets.	
William Montague Cobb	Gamma	As the first African American to earn a Ph.D. in anthropology, President of the NAACP from 1976 to 1982. Founder of Kappa Psi Chapter	
Charles R. Drew	Alpha Psi	Responsible for the single most important significant medical event with the creation of blood/plasma separation. This process has saved millions of lives in times of peace and war.	
Ernest Melville DuPorte	Sigma	Entomologist. In group of 13 members that were first international members of the fraternity, in newly established Sigma chapter at McGill University in Montreal, Quebec, Canada. (The chapter later moved to Michigan State University.)	
John Hopps	Psi	Nuclear engineer at Massachusetts Institute of Technology, Deputy Undersecretary of Defense under George W. Bush	
Percy Lavon Julian	Sigma Omega	American research chemist and a pioneer in the chemical synthesis of medicinal drugs from plants	
Ernest Everett Just	Founder	Founder. Was a pioneering African-American biologist, academic and science writer	
Ronald McNair	Mu Psi (1969)	Astronaut (perished in the Space Shuttle Challenger disaster in 1986); Laser Physicist; member of the Baháʼí Faith	
Joseph Hoffman Jr.		Medical doctor from Charleston, South Carolina	

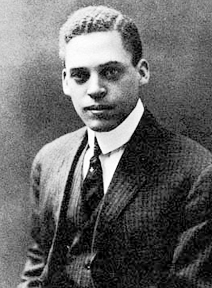
Ernest Just

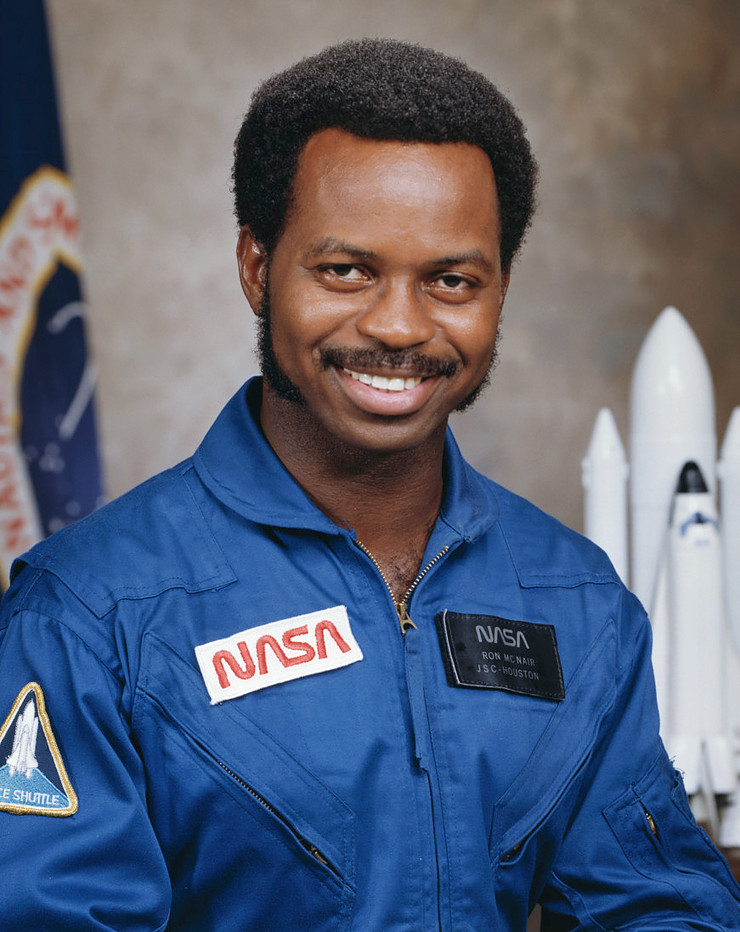
Ronald McNair

== Sports ==
Name	Original chapter	Notability	Ref.
Herb Adderley	Sigma	Professional football player with the Green Bay Packers, Pro Football Hall of Fame.	
Anthony Adams	Nu	Professional Football Player Chicago Bears Defensive Tackle	
Mark Anderson	Beta Eta	Professional Football Player Buffalo Bills Defensive End	
Ottis Anderson	Eta Pi	Professional Football Player New York Giants Running Back	
Jordan Babineaux	Delta Eta	professional football player Seattle Seahawks	
Jerry Ball		professional football player Oakland Raiders	
Joe Black		Professional Baseball player Brooklyn Dodgers Pitcher	
Thaddeus Bullard	Omicron Zeta	Former University of Florida and professional football player, current WWE wrestler known as Titus O'Neil	
Brian Carpenter	Phi	professional football player – Washington Redskins, New York Giants, Buffalo Bills	
Vince Carter	Omicron Omicron	professional basketball player	
Quinton Coples	Psi Delta	professional football player – New York Jets	
Keion Crossen	Theta Lambda	professional football player and Super Bowl champion	
Nakobe Dean	Beta Zeta	professional football player Philadelphia Eagles	
Tony Delk	Rho Lambda	professional basketball player	
Mark Duper	Theta Delta	former professional football player	
Billy Joe Dupree	Sigma	Football Player Dallas Cowboys 1st Round Pick 1973	
Irving Fryar	Tau Kappa	professional football player New England Patriots	
Rhadi Ferguson	Alpha	For Judo USA Champion and 2004 Olympian	
Clarence Gaines		coached most basketball games in college history	
Alex Gordon	Psi Theta	professional football player	
Ken Hamlin	Gamma Eta	professional football player	
Ramon Harewood	Psi	professional football player Baltimore Ravens	
James Hasty	Chi Alpha Alpha	professional football player – Kansas City Chiefs	
Madre Hill	Pi Omicron	professional football player Oakland Raiders	
DeHart Hubbard	Phi	1924 Summer Olympics–first African American to win an individual Olympic Gold medal for the United States.	
Billy Hunter	Grand Chapter (Special Intake)	Former professional football player for the Washington Redskins and Miami Dolphins; Executive Director of the National Basketball Players Association	
Jalen Hurts	Alpha Tau	professional football player	
Keith Jackson	Pi Delta	professional football player	
Malcolm Jenkins	Iota Psi	professional football player, Thorpe Award Recipient.	
Charles Johnson	Eta Nu	former Major League Baseball catcher, first-ever first-round draft pick of the Florida Marlins, World Series Champion, 4X Golden Glove Award, 2x AllStar.	
Brad Jones	Chi Phi	professional football player – Green Bay Packers	
Ed "Too Tall" Jones	Rho Psi	former professional football player, 1st HBCU player to be taken # 1.	
Sean Jones	Nu Phi	Former Professional Football Player Houston Oilers, Green Bay Packers Defensive End	
Jacoby Jones	Kappa Sigma	professional football player Baltimore Ravens	
Michael Jordan	Omicron Alpha	Hall of Fame former professional basketball player. Owner of the Charlotte Hornets	
David Justice	Eta Omega	former MLB player	
Vonta Leach	Upsilon Zeta	professional football player Baltimore Ravens	
Ray Lewis	Grand Chapter (Honorary)	professional football player Baltimore Ravens	
Robert Mathis	Nu Epsilon	Indianapolis Colts defensive end	
Cedric Maxwell	Epsilon Zeta	former professional basketball player	
Corey Mays	Rho Gamma Gamma	professional football player	
Alonzo Mourning		former professional basketball player	
Steve McNair	Eta	former professional football player	
Shaquille O'Neal	Grand Chapter (Special Intake)	Hall of Fame professional basketball player. Minority owner of the Sacramento Kings.	
Akwasi Owusu-Ansah	Gamma Mu	professional football player Dallas Cowboys #27	
Jabrill Peppers	Phi	professional football player New York Giants #21	
Michael Reid	Epsilon Theta	professional football player Atlanta Falcons #95	
Chester Rogers	Gamma Gamma	professional Football player currently with the Indianapolis Colts	
John Salley	Nu Omega	former professional basketball player; television host	
Bo Scott	Iota Psi	professional football player	
Jerome Singleton	Psi	Gold medalist at 2008 Summer Paralympics, current world 100M champion and world's fastest amputee	
Matt Snell	Iota Psi	professional football player and 1964 AFL Rookie of the Year	
Anthony Smith		Professional football player Oakland Raiders and convicted serial killer	
Stephen A. Smith	Grand Chapter (Honorary)	Former collegiate basketball player, Sports Reporter, Columnist, Radio Host, Television Personality	
Ovince St. Preux	Iota Beta	professional UFC Fighter	
J.T. Thomas	Nu Zeta	professional football player – Jacksonville Jaguars	
Terrence Trammell	Zeta Zeta	Olympic Silver medalist in Hurdles	
Mo Vaughn	Kappa Eta	former professional baseball player	
LeRoy T. Walker		U.S. Olympic Coach (Sprinters)	
Charlie Ward	Mu Beta Beta	former professional basketball player	
Tim Watson	Lambda Phi	former professional football player	
Chuck Wiley	Phi Kappa Kappa	former professional football player	
Steven Wilks	Psi Mu	defensive backs coach, currently with the San Diego Chargers	
Corliss Williamson	Gamma Eta	professional basketball player	
George Wilson	Gamma Eta	professional football player – Buffalo Bills	
Wesley Woodyard	Rho Lambda	professional football player – Denver Broncos	
Rayfield Wright	Upsilon Sigma	professional football player – Dallas Cowboys Hall of Fame	
Teddy Williams	Alpha Delta Lambda (University of Texas at San Antonio- UTSA)	professional football player – Dallas Cowboys	
Bryce Deadmon	Nu Delta Delta (Texas A&M University)	2x Olympic Medalist and Olympic gold medalist	

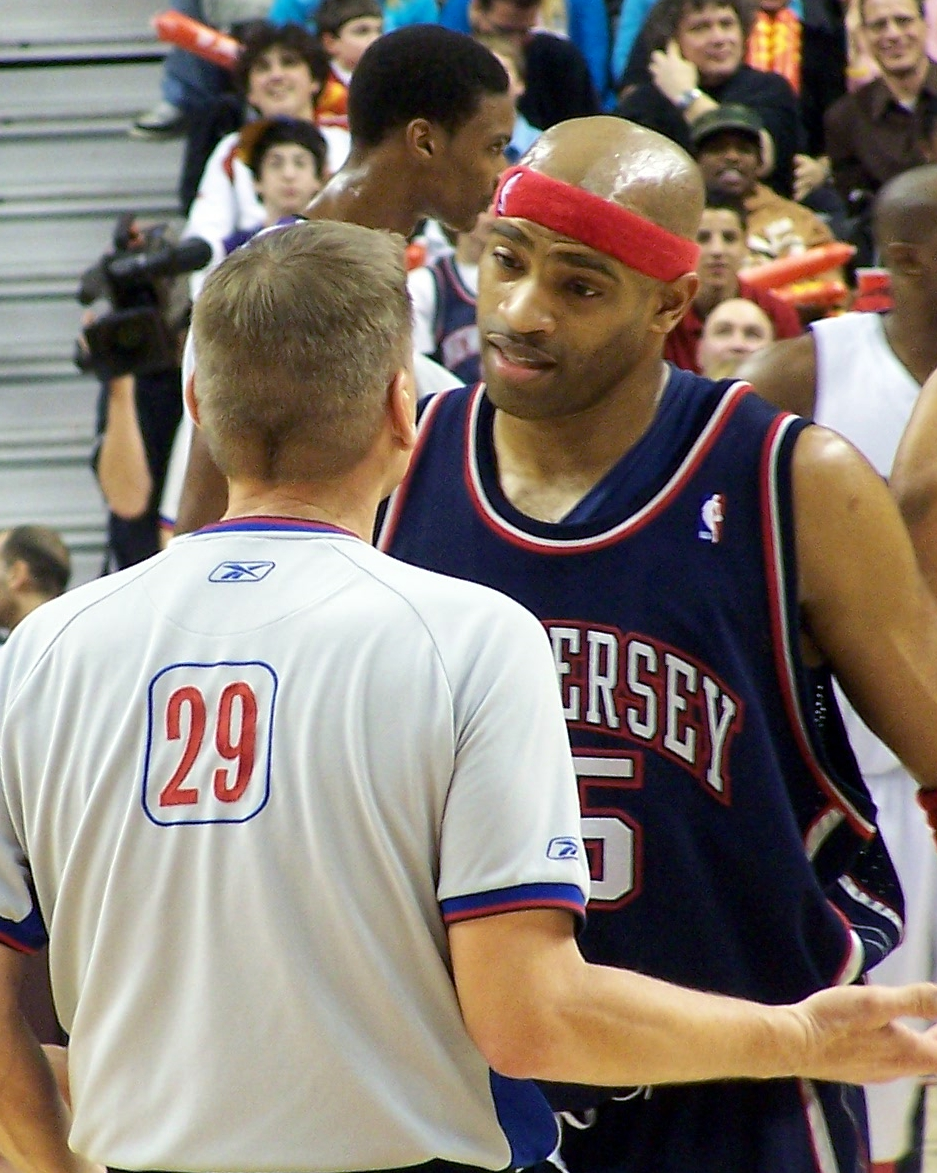
Vince Carter

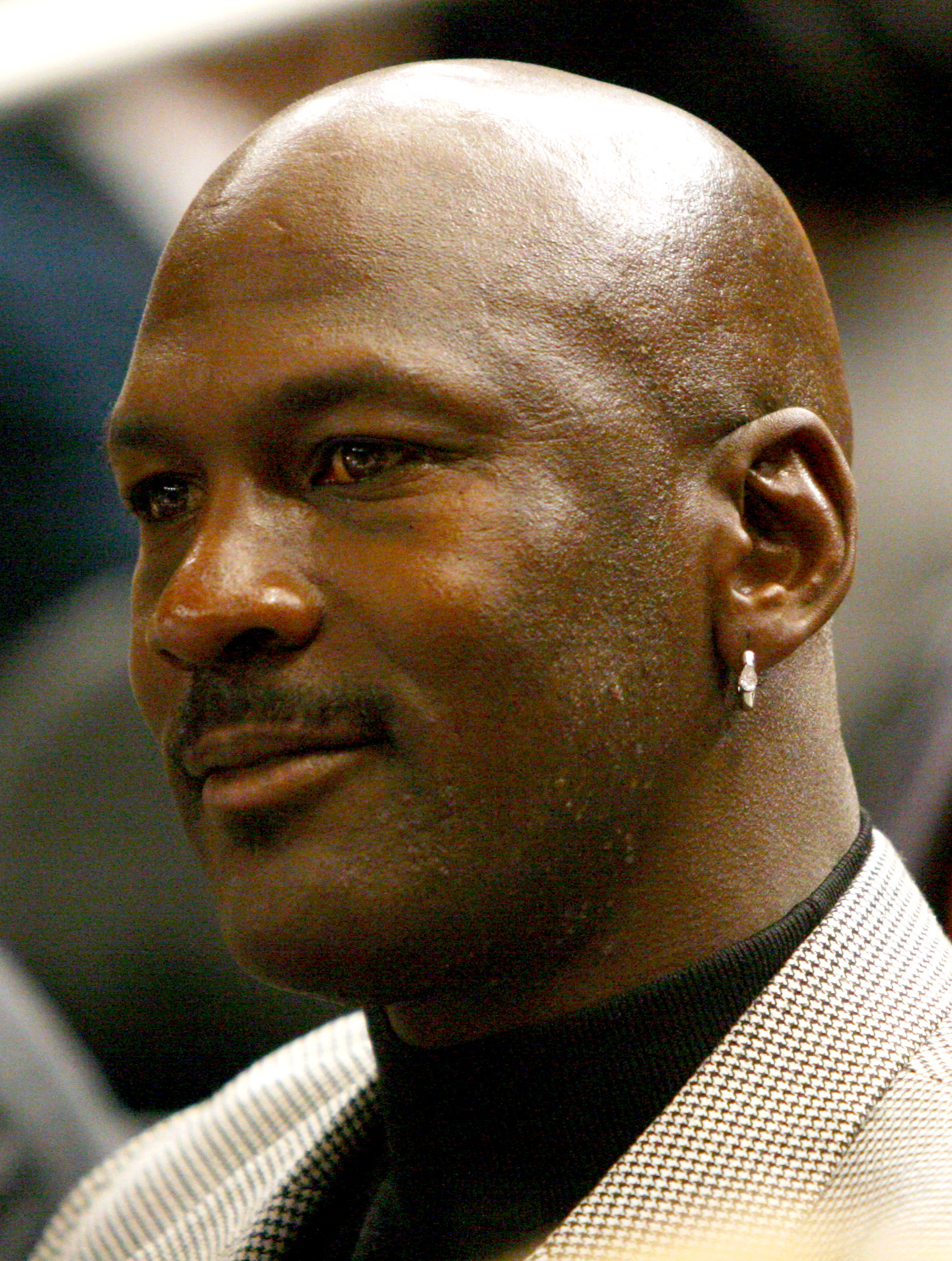
Michael Jordan

Jerry Porter

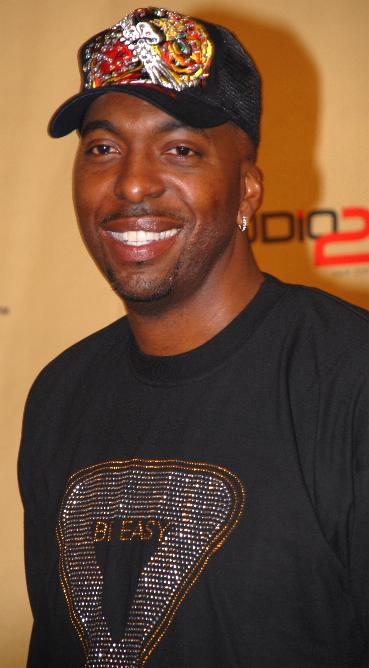
John Salley

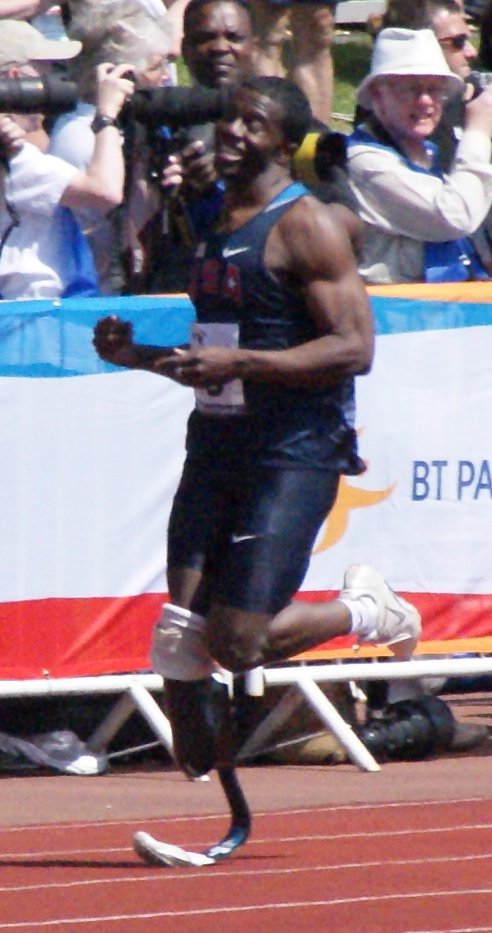
Jerome Singleton
