= John T. Hogeboom =

American politician

John T. Hogeboom (January 31, 1816 – February 11, 1886) was an American lawyer, farmer, and politician from New York.

== Life ==
Hogeboom was born on January 31, 1816, in Ghent, New York, the son of Tobias L. Hogeboom. He was a descendant of John Howland of the Mayflower.

Hogeboom attended Kinderhook Academy and was a pupil at Amos Eaton's school. He graduated from Rensselaer Polytechnic Institute in 1833, and began studying law with Wilcoxson & Bramhall in Kinderhook. He completed his law studies with McKay & Bramhall in Buffalo, and when he was admitted to the bar in 1837 he formed a partnership and practiced law with them. He then moved to Nassau in 1840 and practiced law there. At that point he became active in politics, and after addressing 60 open-air mass-meetings in the 1844 campaign his voice was ruined. He then decided to leave his law practice and to work as a farmer in Ghent.

Despite his retirement to a farm, Hogeboom remained politically active, especially in regards to slavery. His father was an advocate for abolishing slavery in the state of New York, even though he was a slave owner himself. Following his father's example, he became a vocal opponent of the institution. Initially a Democrat, he was a member of the Barnburners faction and one of 100 New York Democrats to protest the nomination of James Buchanan and the national Democratic platform.

Following the 1846 New York Constitutional Convention, Hogeboom served as county judge for two terms. He was unanimously nominated for a third term, but he refused as by then he believed he would soon leave the Democratic Party. He joined the Republican Party upon its formation but declined a nomination from them to Congress. He was nominated and elected to the New York State Assembly by them, serving in the Assembly in 1857 representing the Columbia County 2nd District. In the 1857 New York state election, he was the Republican candidate for New York State Treasurer, but he lost the election to Isaac V. Vanderpoel. He was a delegate to the 1860 Republican National Convention. In 1875, he was elected back to the Assembly, again representing the Columbia County 2nd District, and served in the Assembly in 1876 and 1877. He also served as United States appraiser and general appraiser for the Port of New York for 12 years.

In 1842, Hogeboom married Sarah McClellan of Nassau. They had five children.

Hogeboom died at home on February 11, 1886. He was buried in Ghent Union Cemetery.

New York State Assembly
Preceded by Adam A. Hoysradt	New York State Assembly; Columbia County, 2nd District; 1857	Succeeded by Lorenzo Gile
Preceded by Alonzo H. Farrar	New York State Assembly; Columbia County, 2nd District; 1876–1877	Succeeded by Samuel Wilbor
