= DeWitt Griffin =

American politician (1836–1902)

DeWitt Griffin (March 27, 1836 – April 7, 1902) was an American lawyer and politician from New York.

== Life ==
Griffin was born in Middletown, New York on March 27, 1836. He was the son of Matthew Griffin and Clarissa Dodge.

Griffin attended the Albany Normal School, followed by the Albany Law School. He was admitted to the bar in 1857, at which point he began practicing law in his native village, Griffin's Corner.

Griffin was Justice of the Peace for Middletown for three terms and Postmaster of Griffin's Corner from 1879 to 1885. He was Assistant Sergeant-at-Arms in the New York State Assembly in 1874 and its Superintendent of Documents in 1877. In 1892, he was elected to the New York State Assembly as a Republican, representing Delaware County. He served in the Assembly in 1893. In the Assembly, he proposed amendments to highway, game, and banking laws.

Griffin was a member of the Methodist Church. In 1861, he married Mary Stone. Mary died in 1870, and their only child, Aurelia, died as an infant shortly afterwards. Griffin later married Viola Sharp of Shandaken. Their children were Clinton, Matthew, and Warner.

Griffin died at home from stomach cancer on April 7, 1902. He was buried in Margaretville Cemetery in Margaretville.

New York State Assembly
Preceded by James R. Cowan	New York State Assembly; Delaware County; 1893	Succeeded by Wesley Gould
