= DeWitt Webb =

American politician (1840–1917)

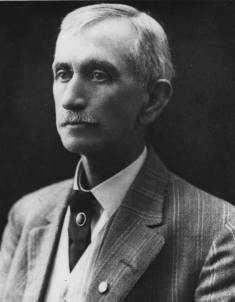
- Born: December 19, 1840; Clinton, New York
- Died: April 12, 1917 (aged 76); St. Augustine, Florida
- Known for: St. Augustine Monster
- Scientific career
- Fields: Medicine; Natural history
- Workplaces: Florida State Legislature; Mayor (St. Augustine); Flagler Hospital; State School for the Deaf and Blind; Fort Marion; St. Augustine Historical Society and Institute of Science

DeWitt Webb (December 19, 1840 Clinton, Oneida County, New York – April 12, 1917 St. Augustine, Florida) was a physician, politician, and naturalist. He was the founder, and for 34 years President, of the St. Augustine Historical Society and Institute of Natural Science.

== Life ==
Webb practiced medicine in Salt Point, New York. He was president of the New York State Assembly (Dutchess Co., 2nd D.) in 1876 and 1877.

Webb moved to St. Augustine in 1880. He was a member of the St. Augustine Free Public Library Association. Professionally, Webb was a practicing doctor at Flagler Hospital and was assistant doctor at the State School for the Deaf and Blind. He was also the Acting Assistant Surgeon and Medical Officer at Fort Marion at the time when Native Americans lived there during the 1880s. Webb was a member of the Florida State Legislature and Mayor of St. Augustine in 1911 and 1912.

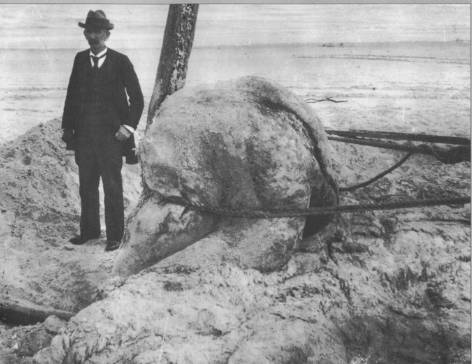
Webb beside the "St. Augustine Monster"

Webb is probably best known for his involvement in the documenting of the St. Augustine Monster of 1896. He was the only person of an academic background to examine the specimen in situ.

New York State Assembly
Preceded by Benjamin S. Broas	New York State Assembly; Dutchess County, 2nd District; 1876–1877	Succeeded by Peter Hulme
