= Abijah J. Wellman =

American politician

Abijah Joslyn Wellman (May 6, 1836 in Friendship, Allegany County, New York – June 8, 1889 in Friendship, Allegany Co., NY) was an American merchant, banker and politician from New York. He was Supervisor of the town of Friendship from 1866 to 1872, Chairman of the Board of Supervisors of Allegany County for three years, and a member of the New York State Senate from 1874 to 1877.

== Early life and education ==
Wellman was born on 6 May 1836, the son of Jonas Wellmast MD and Keziah (Joslyn) Wellman. He attended Oberlin College from 1854 to 1855.

== Career and military service ==
Wellman became a merchant, and later a banker.

At the beginning of the American Civil War, in September 1861, he was appointed as captain of the 85th New York Volunteers and later promoted to major. In February 1862, he was promoted to lieutenant colonel. He fought in the Battle of Seven Pines and was severely wounded in the chest.

From 1864 on, he also engaged in the lumber trade.

He was Supervisor of the town of Friendship from 1866 to 1872; Chairman of the Board of Supervisors of Allegany County for three years, a delegate to the 1872 Republican National Convention, and a member of the New York State Senate (30th D.) from 1874 to 1877, sitting in the 97th, 98th, 99th and 100th New York State Legislatures.

He was also Cashier of the First National Bank of Friendship for nearly 25 years.

== Personal life and death ==
In 1863, Wellman married Kate Miner (1842–1926), and they had five children. Wellman died at his home in Friendship on 8 June 1889 after suffering for a long time from sequels of his war wound. He was buried at the Mount Hope Cemetery.

== Sources ==
- Wellman genealogy at Gen Forum

New York State Senate
Preceded by James Wood	New York State Senate; 30th District; 1874–1877	Succeeded by James H. Loomis
