= William Gulick =

American politician (1814–1904)

William Gulick (December 7, 1814 – March 15, 1904) was an American physician and politician from Watkins Glen, New York.

== Life ==
Gulick was born on December 7, 1814, in Ovid, New York, the son of Samuel Gulick and Ann Sayre.

Gulick attended common schools, Ovid Academy, and Homer Academy. After spending a year teaching school, he studied medicine under Dr. E. J. Busvine of Ovid and Dr. Lewis Post of Lodi. He then studied at the College of Physicians and Surgeons in Fairfield. In 1838, he received a medical license and began working in Tyrone. In 1865, he moved to Watkins Glen and carried out a general practice there for the rest of his life. He received an M.D. from the State University of New York in 1878.

Gulick was a Democrat until 1861 and the start of the American Civil War, when he became a Republican. He was school commissioner in 1855 and town supervisor of Tyrone in 1863. In 1875, he was elected to the New York State Assembly as a Republican, representing Schuyler County. He served in the Assembly in 1876 and 1877.

In 1837, Gulick married Louisa Couch, daughter of Aaron Couch. They had two daughters, Anah and Anna E. Anah died before her father, and Anna was a music and painting teacher who published some of her musical compositions.

Gulick died on March 15, 1904.

New York State Assembly
Preceded by William H. Fish (New York)	New York State Assembly; Schuyler County; 1876–1877	Succeeded by Abram V. Mekeel
