= John R. Kennaday =

American politician

John Robert Kennaday (September 12, 1830 – 1884) was an American lawyer and politician from New York.

== Life ==
He was the son of Rev. John Kennaday DD (1800–1863). He graduated from Dickinson College. Then he studied law, was admitted to the bar, practiced in New York City and resided in Brooklyn. He married Anna Martin (died 1884).

He was a member of the New York State Assembly (Kings Co., 2nd D.) in 1875.

He was a member of the New York State Senate (2nd D.) in 1876 and 1877.

== Sources ==
- Life Sketches of Government Officers and Members of the Legislature of the State of New York in 1875 by W. H. McElroy and Alexander McBride (pg. 216ff)
- DIED; ANNA MARTIN KENNADAY (his daughter), in NYT on December 1, 1865
- DIED; ANNA M. KENNADAY (his wife) in NYT on March 15, 1884
- PAUL KENNADAY DIED AT AGE OF 56 (his son), in NYT on May 5, 1929 (subscription required)

New York State Assembly
Preceded by John J. Allen	New York State Assembly; Kings County, 2nd District; 1875	Succeeded by Jonathan Ogden
New York State Senate
Preceded by John W. Coe	New York State Senate; 2nd District; 1876–1877	Succeeded by James F. Pierce
