= Darius A. Moore =

American politician (1833–1905)

Darius Alonzo Moore (April 13, 1833 – June 26, 1905) was an American merchant and politician from New York.

== Life ==
He was born in canton, New York, the son of John W. Moore (born 1800) and Almira (Farr) Moore (born 1811). He attended Gouverneur Wesleyan Seminary. Then he became a merchant. On July 17, 1856, he married Emily Beebe (1834–1908), and they had several children.

He was Clerk of the Town of De Kalb until 1865; and Supervisor of the Town of De Kalb from 1867 to 1875.

He was a member of the New York State Assembly (St. Lawrence Co., 1st D.) in 1872 and 1873.

He was a member of the New York State Senate (17th D.) in 1876 and 1877.

He was buried at the Bayside Cemetery in Potsdam, New York.

== Sources ==
- Life Sketches of Executive Officers and Members of the Legislature of the State of New York by William H. McElroy & Alexander McBride (1873; pg. 257f)
- History of De Kalb, NY transcribed from Our County and Its People: A Memorial Record of St. Lawrence County, New York by Gates Curtis (1894)
- Moore genealogy at RootsWeb

New York State Assembly
Preceded by George M. Gleason	New York State Assembly; St. Lawrence County, 1st District; 1872–1873	Succeeded by Seth G. Pope
New York State Senate
Preceded by Wells S. Dickinson	New York State Senate; 17th District; 1876–1877	Succeeded by Dolphus S. Lynde
