= Lewis C. Lang =

American politician

Lewis C. Lang (March 29, 1843 – December 9, 1893) was an American lawyer and politician from New York.

== Life ==
Lang was born in Potsdam, New York on March 29, 1843. He attended the St. Lawrence Academy (today the State University of New York at Potsdam) in 1860-1861 and Lawrenceville Academy in 1863.

After teaching for several years, Lang studied law under John R. Brinckerhoff of Norfolk and practiced law with him. He later moved to Brasher Falls, where he established a substantial law practice and lived for the rest of his life. He represented the town as a town supervisor. He helped organize a school in Brasher and Winthrop and served on the board of education.

In 1875, Lang was elected to the New York State Assembly as a Republican, representing the St. Lawrence County 3rd District. He served in the Assembly in 1876, 1877, and 1892. While in the Assembly, he proposed a constitutional amendment that would cut off pensions for New York Supreme Court and Court of Appeals judges. He also served as district attorney of St. Lawrence County from 1882 to 1887.

In 1865, he married Elizabeth Bailey of Massena. They had one daughter, Jessie, who married Dr. C. C. Kellum. Elizabeth died in 1888. In 1889, he married Nora O'Brien of Norfolk.

Lang died of complications from rheumatism and Bright's disease on December 9, 1893. He was buried in Fairview Cemetery in Brasher Falls.

New York State Assembly
| Preceded by Jonah Sanford | New York State Assembly; St. Lawrence County, 3rd District; 1876-1877 | Succeeded by Rufus S. Palmer |
| Preceded by William Bradford | New York State Assembly; St. Lawrence County, 3rd District; 1892 | Succeeded by District Abolished |
