= Thomas Coleman (New York politician) =

American politician

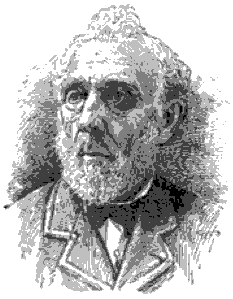
- Born: June 16, 1808; Barnstable, Massachusetts
- Died: August 29, 1894 (aged 86); Troy, New York
- Spouse: Catherine Jane Lewis (m. 1839)
- Parent: Nathaniel Coleman

Thomas Coleman (June 16, 1808 – August 29, 1894) was an American merchant, banker and politician from New York.

== Life ==
He was born on June 16, 1808, in Barnstable, Massachusetts, the son of Nathaniel Coleman (c.1781–1848).

He attended the common schools, and in 1824 became a store clerk in New Bedford. In 1827, he moved to Troy, New York, and became a merchant. In January 1839, he married Catherine Jane Lewis. In 1852, he became a director of the Bank of Troy, and later was President of the First National Bank of Troy. He also engaged in the lumber trade.

He entered politics as a National Republican, became a Whig in 1834, then joined the Know Nothings, and later became a Republican. In 1857, he was elected as Alderman (3rd Ward) of Troy, and was re-elected for many terms.

He was a member of the New York State Assembly (Rensselaer Co., 1st D.) in 1859 and 1860. In 1865, he was appointed to the Board of Commissioners of the Capital Police District. He was a presidential elector in 1872, voting for Ulysses S. Grant and Henry Wilson.

He was a member of the New York State Senate (12th D.) in 1876 and 1877.

He died on August 29, 1894, in Troy, New York, from "infirmities attendant upon old age" at age 86.

== Sources ==
- Documents of the Assembly (1870; Report of the Police Board)

New York State Assembly
Preceded by Jason C. Osgood	New York State Assembly; Rensselaer County, 1st District; 1859–1860	Succeeded by Charles J. Saxe
New York State Senate
Preceded by Roswell A. Parmenter	New York State Senate; 12th District; 1876–1877	Succeeded by Charles Hughes
