= Caspar A. Baaden =

American politician

Caspar Anton Lucas Baaden (July 26, 1833 in Bonn, Prussia – July 1918) was an American politician from New York.

== Life ==
He came from Prussia to the United States and was naturalized in 1867.

He was a flour-dealer on Broome Street in New York City.

He was a member of the New York State Senate (6th D.) in 1876 and 1877.

He died in July 1918, and was buried at the Green-Wood Cemetery in Brooklyn.

== Sources ==
- Naturalization Records
- REPUBLICAN CONVENTIONS in NYT on October 20, 1875
- Journal of the Senate (99th Session) (pg. 3)

New York State Senate
Preceded by Jacob A. Gross	New York State Senate; 6th District; 1876–1877	Succeeded by Louis S. Goebel
