= Theodore A. Case =

American politician

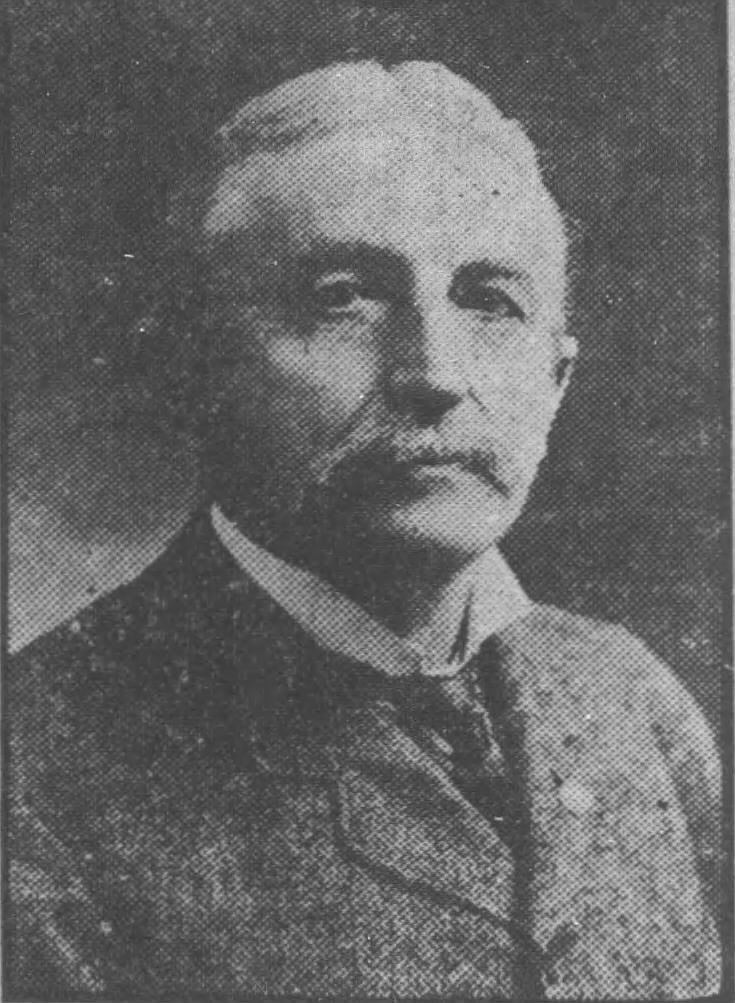

Member of the New York State Assembly from Chautauqua County's 2nd District
- In office 1876–1877
- Preceded by: Obed Edson
- Succeeded by: Temple A. Parker

Personal details
- Born: June 14, 1841 Ellington, New York, U.S.
- Died: October 23, 1923 (aged 82)
- Party: Republican
- Occupation: Lawyer, banker, politician

Military service
- Branch/service: Union Army
- Years of service: 1862–1865
- Unit: Company G, 9th New York Cavalry Regiment
- Battles/wars: American Civil War

Theodore A. Case (June 14, 1841 – October 23, 1923) was an American lawyer, banker and politician who served in the New York State Assembly for two terms from 1876 to 1877.

== Life ==
Case was born on June 14, 1841, in Ellington, New York, the son of Salmon T. and Sarah (Ayers) Case. While studying law, he enlisted in Company G of the 9th New York Cavalry Regiment during the American Civil War in 1862. He was wounded in battle on May 30, 1864 after being shot in the leg. After the war, he returned to studying law and passed the bar exam in 1867. He later became a banker in Ellington for 18 years.

Case served as the town supervisor for Ellington for 19 years, beginning in 1874, and was chairman of the Chautauqua County Board of Supervisors.

In 1876, Case successfully ran for state Assembly, representing Chautauqua County's second district. He won reelection in 1877.

On June 5, 1906, Case announced his intention to once again for state Assembly. He withdrew from consideration later that month to instead run for State Senate. At the Republican Senatorial Convention in Jamestown on July 7, Case lost the nomination to Albert T. Fancher 67-52.

New York State Assembly
Preceded by Obed Edson	New York State Assembly; Chautauqua County, 2nd District; 1876-1877	Succeeded by Temple A. Parker
