= William C. Lamont =

American politician

William C. Lamont (born November 25, 1827 Charlotteville, Schoharie County, New York) was an American lawyer and politician from New York.

== Life ==
He was the son of David William Lamont (1805–1855) and Jane (Colegrove) Lamont. He attended Jefferson and Schoharie academies. Then he studied law, was admitted to the bar in 1853, and practiced in Charlotteville. In 1852, he married Eliza Becker.

He was a member of the New York State Assembly (Schoharie Co.) in 1859. Afterwards he removed to Richmondville. There, he was Judge of Schoharie County from 1864 to 1871. Afterwards he removed to Cobleskill.

He was a member of the New York State Senate (23rd D.) in 1876 and 1877. He was again Judge of Schoharie County from 1888 to 1893.

== Sources ==
- Biographical Sketches of the State Officers and Members of the Legislature of the State of New York in 1859 by William D. Murphy (pg. 174f)
- Courts and Lawyers of New York: A History, 1609-1925 by Alden Chester & Edwin Melvin Williams (Vol. I; pg. 1080)

New York State Assembly
Preceded by John H. Salisbury	New York State Assembly; Schoharie County; 1859	Succeeded by John W. Couchman
New York State Senate
Preceded by James G. Thompson	New York State Senate; 23rd District; 1876–1877	Succeeded by Nathaniel C. Marvin
