= Eugene L. Demers =

American politician

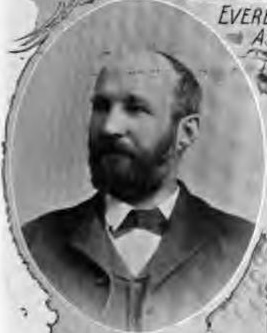
Eugene L. Demers (1897)

Eugene L. Demers (August 1842 – April 26, 1912) was an American politician from New York.

== Life ==
He was born on August 19 or 24, 1842, in Troy, Rensselaer County, New York, the son of David Demers and Jane A. Demers. He attended the common schools, and became a printer working for the Troy Times. On August 27, 1862, he enlisted as a private in the 125th New York Volunteer Infantry Regiment. He lost a leg in the Battle of Gettysburg and was subsequently discharged, and later ran a grocery store in Lansingburgh. He married Margaret Cowley, and they had two daughters.

He entered politics as a Republican, and was at times a trustee of the Village of Lansingburgh, and Supervisor of the Town of Lansingburgh.

He was Doorkeeper of the New York State Assembly in 1872, 1873, 1874, 1876 and 1877; a member of the State Assembly (Rensselaer Co., 2nd D.) in 1885 and 1886; Second Assistant Doorkeeper of the State Assembly in 1897; and an assistant doorkeeper of the State Assembly in 1900.

He died on April 26, 1912, at his home in Lansingburgh.

New York State Assembly
Preceded by Sylvanus D. Locke	New York State Assembly; Rensselaer County, 2nd District; 1885–1886	Succeeded by J. Irving Baucus
