= Stephen H. Hammond =

American politician

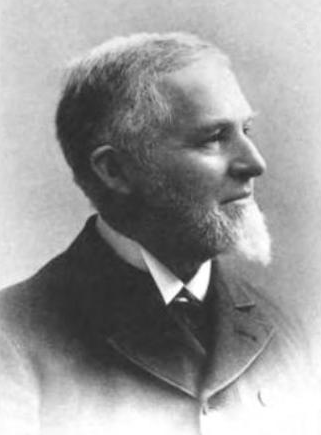

Member of the New York State Senate
- In office 1876–1877

Member of the New York State Assembly
- In office 1874–1875

Personal details
- Born: November 24, 1828 Groton, New York, US
- Died: March 9, 1910 (aged 81) Geneva, New York, US
- Party: Democratic
- Spouse: Lucy Wadsworth Langdon (m. 1856)
- Children: 1
- Education: Geneva College
- Occupation: Lawyer, politician

Stephen Hallett Hammond (November 24, 1828 – March 9, 1910) was an American lawyer and politician from New York.

== Life ==
Stephen H. Hammond was born in Groton, New York on November 24, 1828, the son of Clark Hammond. He attended the common schools and Ithaca Academy. He graduated from Geneva College in 1854. While in college, he also studied law, and was admitted to the bar. In 1856, he married Lucy Wadsworth Langdon (1835–1895), and they had one daughter.

While his uncle Elbridge G. Spaulding was state treasurer from 1854 to 1855, Hammond did some work for the Treasury. In 1856, he was appointed Deputy New York Attorney General and held the post for 16 years.

He was a member of the New York State Assembly (Ontario Co., 1st D.) in 1874 and 1875, and was chairman of the Committee on Ways and Means in 1875.

He was a member of the New York State Senate (26th D.) in 1876 and 1877.

Later he was Chairman of the Board of Managers of the Willard Asylum for the Chronic Insane.

He died in Geneva, New York on March 9, 1910.

New York State Assembly
Preceded by Ambrose L. Van Dusen	New York State Assembly; Ontario County, 1st District; 1874–1875	Succeeded by Seth Stanley
New York State Senate
Preceded by William Johnson	New York State Senate; 26th District; 1876–1877	Succeeded by Edwin Hicks
