= Titus O'Neil =

American wrestler & arena football player (born 1977)

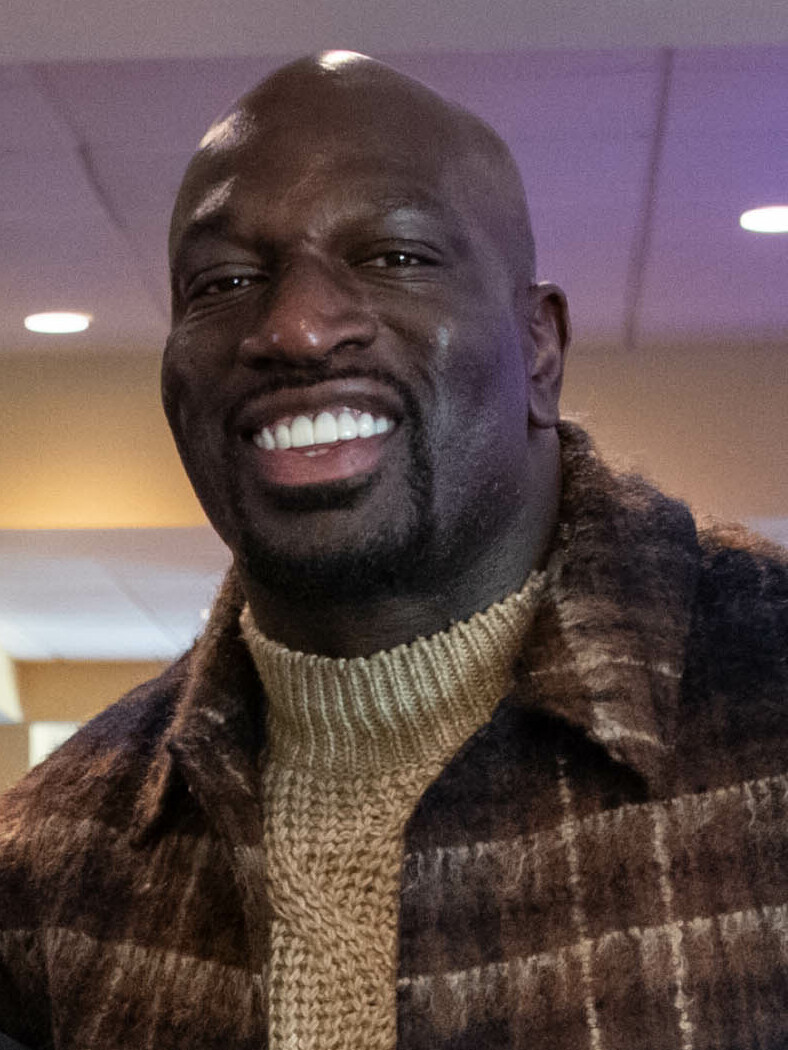
- O'Neil in 2022

Personal information
- Born: Thaddeus Michael Bullard; April 29, 1977 (age 49) Boynton Beach, Florida, U.S.
- Education: University of Florida
- Children: 3

Professional wrestling career
- Ring name(s): Rufus Patterson; Titus O'Neil
- Billed height: 6 ft 6 in (198 cm)
- Billed weight: 270 lb (122 kg)
- Billed from: Live Oak, Florida
- Trained by: Florida Championship Wrestling
- Debut: November 12, 2009
- Retired: September 22, 2026
- Football career

Profile
- Position: Defensive end

Personal information
- Listed height: 6 ft 4 in (1.93 m)
- Listed weight: 270 lb (122 kg)

Career information
- High school: Suwannee (Live Oak, Florida)
- College: Florida
- NFL draft: 2001: undrafted

Career history
- Carolina Cobras (2003); Las Vegas Gladiators (2004–2005); Tampa Bay Storm (2006); Utah Blaze (2007)

Awards and highlights
- National champion (1996)
- Stats at ArenaFan.com

Thaddeus Michael Bullard (born April 29, 1977) is an American retired professional wrestler and former arena football player. He is signed to WWE, where he works as the Global Ambassador. Described by the company as "one of the most philanthropic superstars in WWE history," Bullard is the recipient of the WWE Hall of Fame Warrior Award.

Bullard played college football for the University of Florida, and thereafter played in the Arena Football League (AFL). His career as a professional wrestler began under the ring name Titus O'Neil in WWE's developmental territory Florida Championship Wrestling (FCW), before being moved to NXT, where he was part of the second season and fifth season, NXT Redemption. In WWE, he is a former one-time WWE Tag Team Champion as part of The Prime Time Players with Darren Young and a former one-time WWE 24/7 Champion, being the inaugural holder of the latter title. In 2021, Bullard was inducted into the WWE Hall of Fame as a recipient of the Warrior Award, honoring his charitable work – especially in his hometown of Tampa, Florida. In the summer of 2021, a public school in Tampa was also named after Bullard honoring his charitable work and contributions to and for the Hillsborough County public school system.

== Early life ==
Thaddeus Michael Bullard was born on April 29, 1977 in Boynton Beach, Florida, to Daria Bullard when she was 12 years old. His mother Daria was molested and raped by her mother's boyfriend at 11 years old, and as a result she became pregnant with Thaddeus. He grew up in Live Oak, Florida, where he resided at the Florida Sheriff's Youth Ranches, and attended Suwannee High School. He was a standout player for the Suwannee Bulldogs high school football, and was recognized by USA Today and Parade magazine as a high school All-American as a senior in 1995.

== Football career ==
Bullard accepted an athletic scholarship to attend the University of Florida in Gainesville, Florida, and played for coach Steve Spurrier's Florida Gators football team from 1997 to 2000. He redshirted during the Gators' 1996 national championship season. Bullard lettered the next four seasons, playing in 44 regular season games with three starts. He was elected student body vice president in April 2000, and graduated in August 2000. While he was an undergraduate, he was initiated as a brother of Omega Psi Phi. After college, Bullard played in the Arena Football League from 2003 to 2007 with the Carolina Cobras, Las Vegas Gladiators, Tampa Bay Storm, and Utah Blaze.

== Professional wrestling career ==
=== World Wrestling Entertainment/WWE ===
==== Developmental territories (2009–2012) ====
Bullard signed a developmental deal with WWE in 2009 and began training with their development territory, Florida Championship Wrestling. He made his television debut on the January 16, 2010, episode of FCW's show on Bright House Sports Network as Titus O'Neil in a tag team match with Skip Sheffield, losing to the team of Vance Archer and Alex Riley. On December 3, O'Neil teamed with Damien Sandow to win the FCW Florida Tag Team Championship after defeating Xavier Woods and Mason Ryan in a match for the vacant championship. The pair lost the championship to Seth Rollins and Richie Steamboat on March 25, 2011.

O'Neil competed in the second season of WWE NXT, with Zack Ryder as his mentor. He debuted on June 8, teaming with Ryder to lose to John Morrison and Eli Cottonwood. During and after the bout the two argued. The following week the two made up. Two weeks later, O'Neil was the first person eliminated from the second season of NXT, and gave a farewell speech before leaving the arena. O'Neil returned for the season finale on August 31, joining the other eliminated rookies in attacking the winner, Kaval.

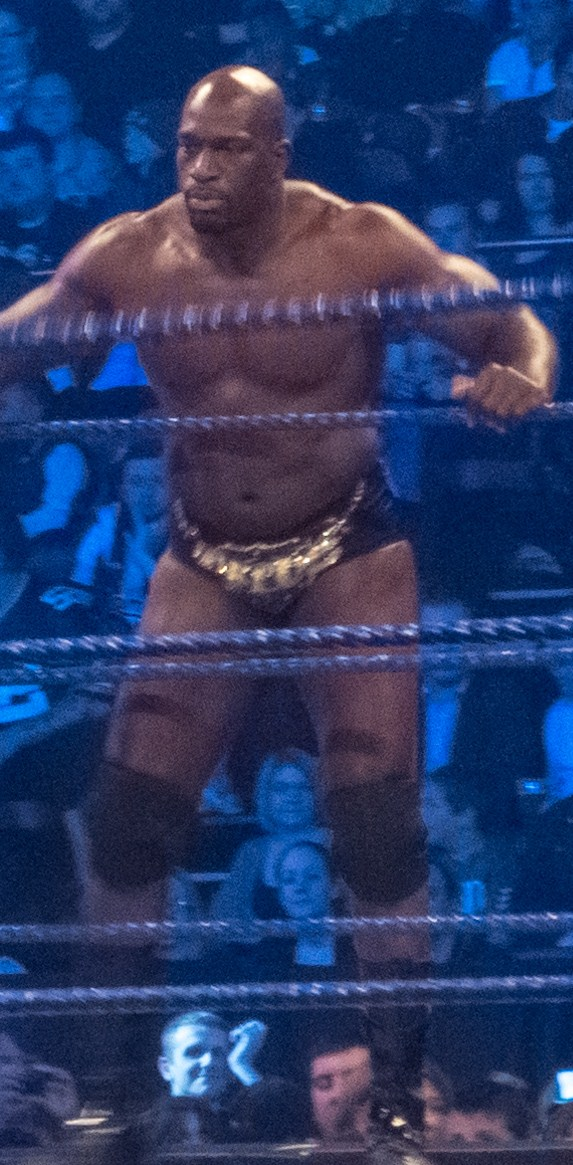
O'Neil in April 2012

In March 2011, O'Neil was selected as one of the six former NXT contestants to return to the show in its fifth season, NXT Redemption, being mentored by Hornswoggle. In the season premiere, O'Neil defeated Lucky Cannon in the main event. The two also feuded with Darren Young and his pro, Hornswoggle's old nemesis, Chavo Guerrerro. Following Lucky Cannon's elimination on the May 14, 2011, episode of NXT Redemption, O'Neil lead the fans in a rendition of Na Na Hey Hey Kiss Him Goodbye, as a tribute to the recently retired Edge. On the June 21 episode of NXT Redemption, O'Neil's pro from season two, Zack Ryder, returned for one night only to face and defeat O'Neil. On the July 12, 2011, episode of NXT, he faced off against Darren Young and Derrick Bateman in a triple threat elimination match, which saw him lose to Bateman. 8 days later, O'Neil teamed up with NXT host Matt Striker in a winning effort against Darren Young and Derrick Bateman after Young was pinned by O'Neil.

On the September 8 episode of WWE Superstars, O'Neil teamed with Percy Watson in a losing effort against Curt Hawkins and Tyler Reks. O'Neil and Watson defeated Derrick Bateman and Tyson Kidd, as well as Bateman and JTG, but lost to Darren Young and JTG.

On the November 16, 2011, episode of NXT, O'Neil was assaulted by a returning Darren Young. Young was then able to get the better of O'Neil twice in tag team matches. The conclusion to O'Neil's feud with Young came when O'Neil defeated Young in a no disqualifications match on the January 18 episode of NXT. O'Neil then turned heel after the match, verbally ripping on the audience, his former pro Hornswoggle, and NXT itself.

O'Neil later urged his friend Percy Watson to also turn his back on the fans on the January 25, 2012, episode of NXT. When Watson refused, O'Neil shoved him and a match between the two was booked, leading to O'Neil defeating Watson. O'Neil continued to attack Watson after the match, leading to Alex Riley saving Watson. O'Neil then formed an alliance with former enemy Darren Young, and the duo teamed up to defeat Watson and Riley on the February 1 and 29 episodes of NXT. O'Neil also faced and defeated Riley on the February 22 episode of NXT. On the March 7 episode of NXT, O'Neil faced Watson, which would result in a loss for O'Neil. O'Neil and Young then moved on to feud with The Usos.

==== The Prime Time Players (2012–2014) ====
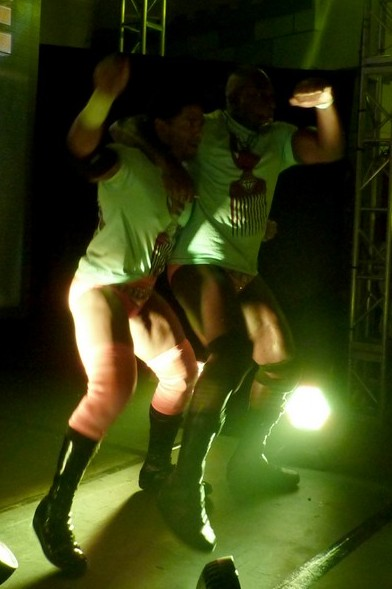
The Prime Time Players in 2013

On the April 18 episode of NXT, it was announced that O'Neil, along with Darren Young, had been moved to the main roster. The team made their debut on the April 20 episode of SmackDown with a victory over The Usos. They began a winning streak before their streak was ended on the May 18 episode of SmackDown by WWE Tag Team Champions Kofi Kingston and R-Truth.

At the No Way Out pay-per-view, O'Neil and Young won a fatal-four-way tag team match to become #1 contenders for the WWE Tag Team Championship after A.W. turned on his clients Primo & Epico. On the July 16 episode of Raw, O'Neil and Young unsuccessfully challenged Kofi Kingston and R-Truth for the WWE Tag Team Championship. On the August 10 episode of SmackDown, they defeated Primo & Epico in a #1 contenders match by disqualification when A.W. provoked Kingston and R-Truth, who were on commentary, into interfering in the match. That same day, A.W. was released from his contract. Despite losing A.W, the Prime Time Players received a title shot at SummerSlam, but were again defeated by Kingston and R-Truth. On the September 7 episode of SmackDown, The Prime Time Players defeated Primo and Epico and The Usos in a triple threat tag team match to earn another shot at the title. On Raw three days later, the Prime Time Players lost their title shot to the team of Kane and Daniel Bryan. At Survivor Series, O'Neil took part in a 10-man elimination tag team match, but was eliminated by Tyson Kidd.

At the 2013 Royal Rumble, O'Neil entered the Royal Rumble match at number 7 but was eliminated by Sheamus. On the March 18 episode of Raw, O'Neil played a new character called Rufus "Pancake" Patterson, his "uncle", accompanying Darren Young in his match against John Cena, in which Young was defeated.

On the August 19, 2013, episode of Raw, the Prime Time Players turned face in a winning effort against The Real Americans (Antonio Cesaro and Jack Swagger), a week after O'Neil's tag-team partner Darren Young's (legitimate) coming out, which received mainstream media coverage. On the Night of Champions pre-show, O'Neil and Young won a tag team turmoil upon entering last, for the opportunity to face The Shield for the WWE Tag Team Championship but lost to Seth Rollins and Roman Reigns on the pay-per-view. Furthering their face turn, the duo were amongst those who saved Daniel Bryan from being injured by Randy Orton. The Prime Time Players would be forced into a 3 on 1 handicap gauntlet match against The Shield as ordered by the COO, Triple H, the same as Dolph Ziggler, Kofi Kingston and Rob Van Dam.

==== Slater-Gator (2014–2015) ====
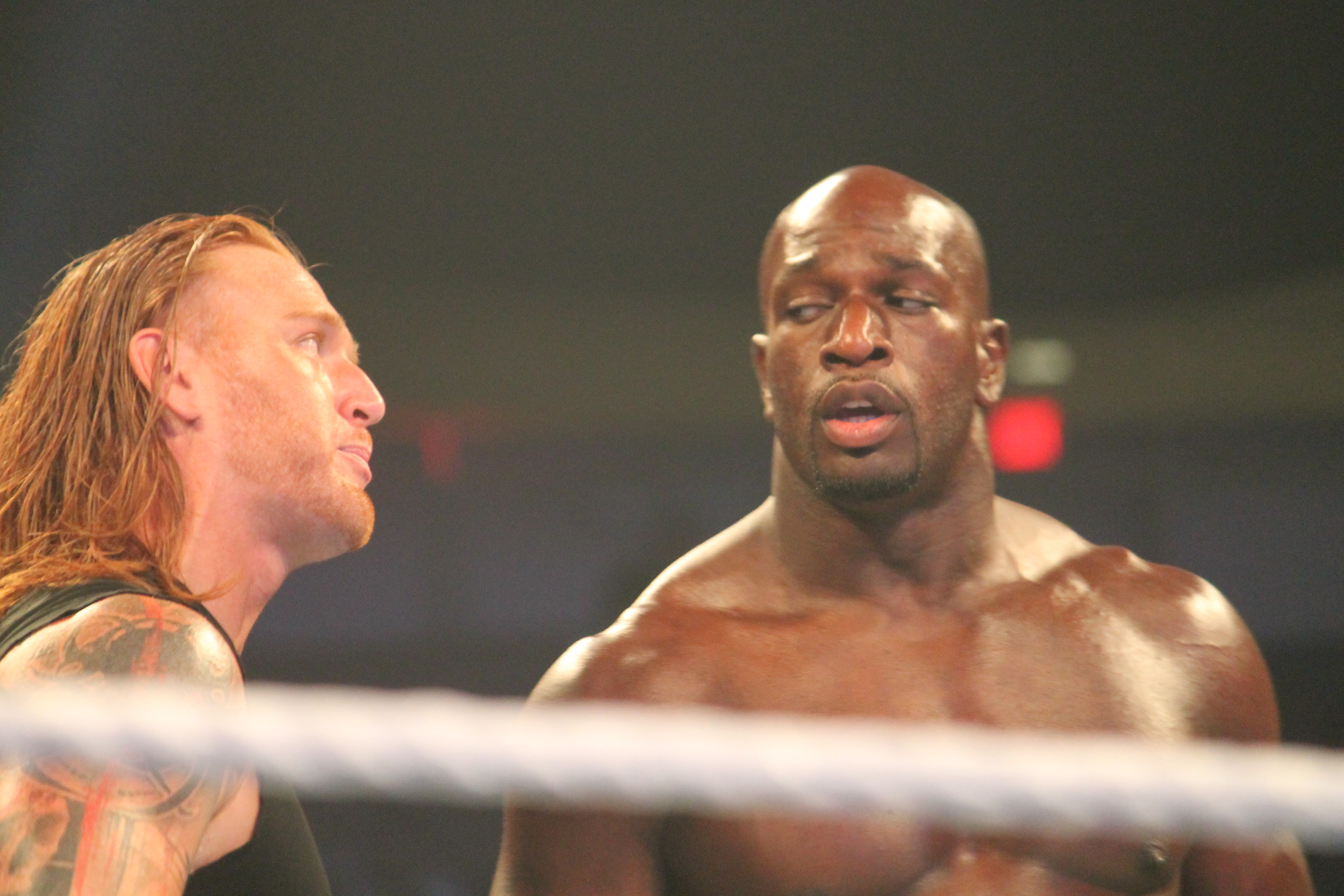
"Slater-Gator" (O'Neil (right) and Slater (left)) in 2014

On the January 31, 2014, episode of SmackDown, O'Neil allowed Curtis Axel to pin Young during a tag-team match. After the match, O'Neil attacked Young to turn heel and disbanded the Prime Time Players. O'Neil defeated Young at Elimination Chamber. O'Neil lost a rematch to Young on the February 26 episode of Main Event. Following this loss, O'Neil began a losing streak to the likes of Big Show, Sheamus and Dolph Ziggler. From mid-April to mid-June, O'Neil commonly appeared on Superstars, where he suffered many losses to Kofi Kingston and Big E. He was also unsuccessful in winning four battle royals: the André the Giant Memorial Battle Royal at WrestleMania XXX, a battle royal for the WWE United States Championship in May, a Money in the Bank qualifying battle royal in June and a battle royal for the WWE Intercontinental Championship at Battleground.

In July, O'Neil formed a tag team with Heath Slater, later known as Slater-Gator. In July and August, they wrestled on Main Event and Superstars. Despite wins over the likes of Zack Ryder and Sin Cara and Gold and Stardust, they suffered losses to El Torito and Hornswoggle and Big E and Kofi Kingston. In September, Slater-Gator lost multiple matches to Adam Rose and to the team of Rose and The Bunny. O'Neil entered the Royal Rumble, being eliminated by Dean Ambrose and eventual winner Roman Reigns in 4 seconds.

==== The Prime Time Players reunion (2015–2016) ====
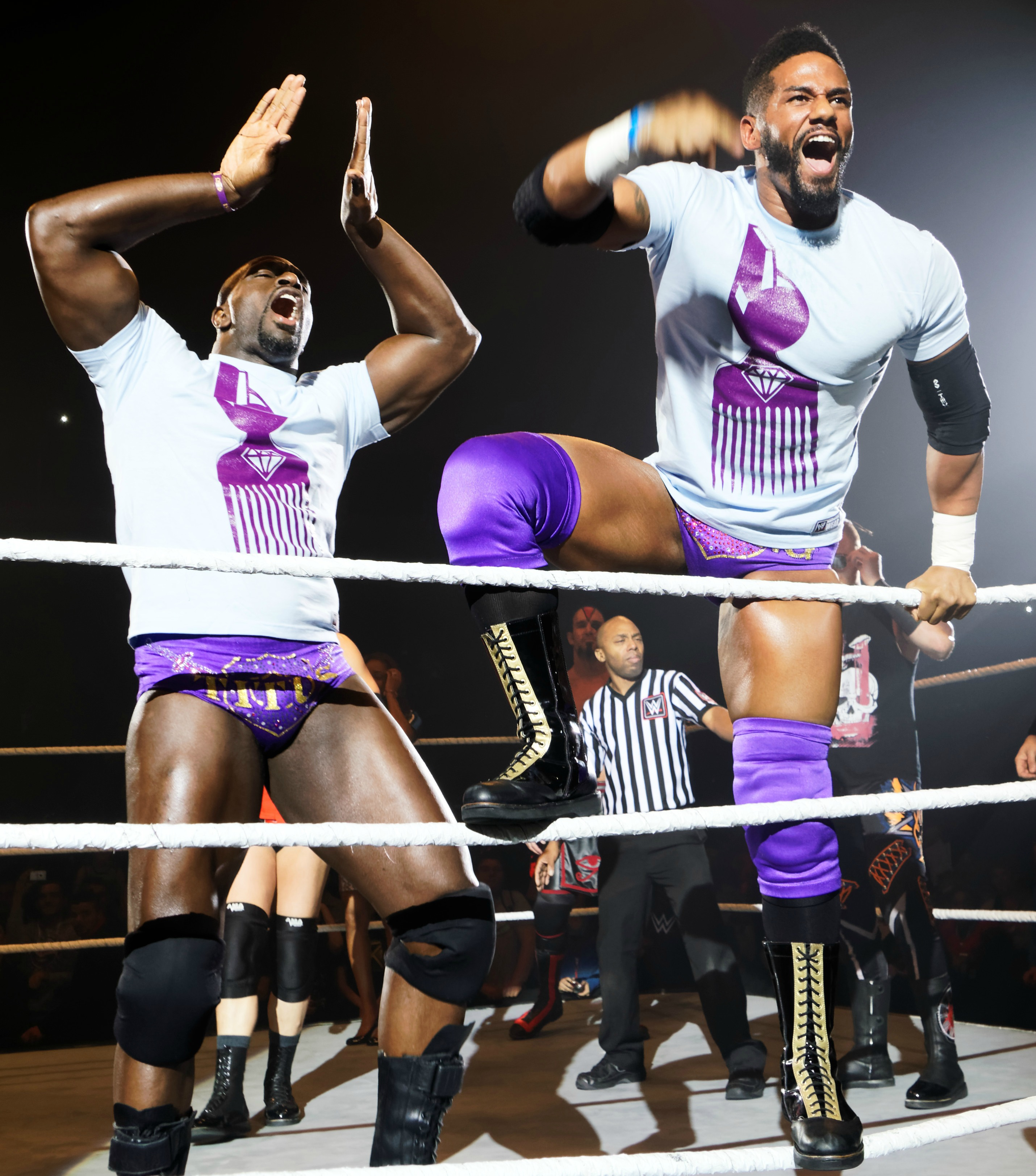
The Prime Time Players during a house show in 2015

On the February 16 episode of Raw, O'Neil turned face by saving his former tag team partner Darren Young from an attack from The Ascension, disbanding Slater-Gator. To acknowledge this breakup, Slater announced on social media that he is going to 'focus on himself'. Then on the February 23 episode of Raw, The Prime Time Players officially reunited to battle The Ascension, with Young picking up the victory. O'Neil participated in the 2nd Annual André the Giant Memorial Battle Royal at WrestleMania 31, before being eliminated by Ryback. At Elimination Chamber, the Prime Time Players participated in the first ever tag team Elimination Chamber match for the WWE Tag Team Championship, however they were the last team to be eliminated by the winners and defending champions The New Day (Big E, Kofi Kingston and Xavier Woods). At Money in the Bank, O'Neil and Young defeated The New Day to win the Tag Team Championship, their first titles in WWE. They later defeated The New Day in a rematch at Battleground. The Prime Time Players dropped the WWE Tag Team Championships back to The New Day at SummerSlam in a fatal–four-way match, also involving The Lucha Dragons and Los Matadores. O'Neil and Young would invoke their championship rematch clause for the September 14 episode of Raw, which they ended up losing against New Day.

On the November 9 episode of Raw, O'Neil would enter the 16-man tournament to crown the new WWE World Heavyweight Champion, losing to Kevin Owens in the first round. On the Survivor Series kick-off show, O'Neil participated in a five-on-five elimination tag team match, teaming with The Dudley Boyz, Neville and Goldust to defeat Stardust, The Ascension, The Miz and Bo Dallas. On the February 8, 2016, episode of Raw, O'Neil had what was described as a "playful, physical" altercation with Vince McMahon as the show was going off the air while the two were on stage during Daniel Bryan's retirement celebration. The following day, O'Neil was suspended for unprofessional conduct relating to the incident, with the suspension reportedly lasting up to 90 days. It was later confirmed that he would be suspended for 60 days.

On the May 2 episode of Raw, O'Neil returned from suspension, participating in a battle royal to determine the #1 contender to the WWE United States Championship. On the May 26 episode of SmackDown, O'Neil entered a feud with United States Champion Rusev. This set up a match between O'Neil and Rusev for the United States Championship at Money in the Bank, which he lost. After the match, Rusev taunted and disrespected O'Neil's children. The following night on Raw, a rematch was scheduled but O'Neil attacked Rusev before the match began. On the July 4 episode of Raw, O'Neil lost in another title match to Rusev, ending the feud.

==== Titus Worldwide (2016–2018) ====
On July 19 at the 2016 WWE draft, O'Neil was drafted to Raw. On the August 1 episode of Raw, O'Neil started a slow heel turn when he questioned his former tag team partner Darren Young on his motives on being "great again". Later that night, he defeated Young by pinning him while grabbing Young's tights. Afterwards, O'Neil got into a backstage altercation with Young's manager Bob Backlund, ending in Young coming to Backlund's defense by attacking O'Neil. The week after on Raw, Young defeated O'Neil by pinning him while grabbing O'Neil's tights, mimicking the way O'Neil defeated him. On the August 15 episode of Raw, O'Neil and Young reconciled and were placed in a match against The Shining Stars. During the match, O'Neil attacked Young with a Clash of the Titus, cementing O'Neil's heel turn. Starting from September 2016, he began a losing streak whilst debuting a new gimmick known as "The Titus Brand". On the October 31 episode of Raw, O'Neil competed in a battle royal to determine who would join Team Raw at the upcoming Survivor Series pay-per-view against Team SmackDown, but was eliminated by Sami Zayn.

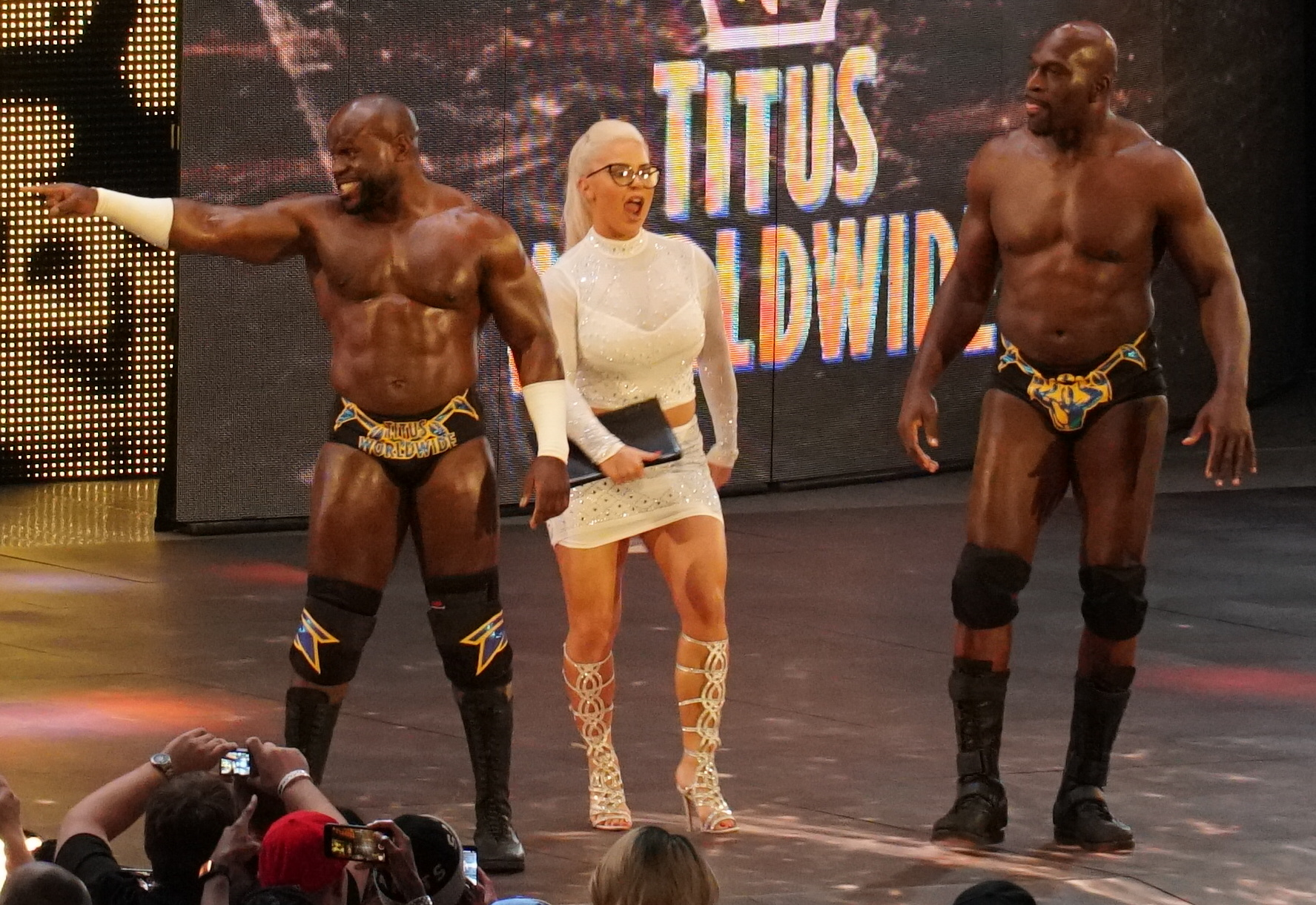
O'Neil (right) along with his fellow Titus Worldwide partners Apollo Crews and Dana Brooke in April 2018

In April 2017, Apollo Crews caught the attention of O'Neil's new "Titus Brand" after being drafted to Raw and recruited him on the brand. He later recruited cruiserweight Akira Tozawa to his brand, which he renamed to "Titus Worldwide" and turned him face in the process. After Dana Brooke challenged Asuka to a match on the November 27, 2017, episode on Raw, in which she lost, O'Neil recruited Brooke to join the brand. Brooke made her first official appearance with the team on the January 1, 2018, episode of Raw accompanying Crews along with O'Neil in a match against Bray Wyatt, in which he was defeated and at this point Tozawa quietly left the team. On the January 8, 2018, episode of Raw, O'Neil and Crews defeated Cesaro and Sheamus in an upset win. On the January 29 episode of Raw, Crews and O'Neil competed in a match against Cesaro and Sheamus for their Tag Team Championships, in which they were unsuccessful at capturing the titles. On February 25 at Elimination Chamber, they competed in another match for the Raw Tag Team Championships, in a losing effort. On Raw the next night, Cesaro and Sheamus defeated Titus Worldwide in a 2 out of 3 falls match to retain the title, winning 2–0 to end the feud.

O'Neil later participated in the André the Giant Memorial Battle Royal at the WrestleMania 34 kickoff show, but he was unsuccessful in both matches. He was also part of the 50-man Greatest Royal Rumble event in which he was eliminated by Braun Strowman. While running to the ring to participate in this match, he famously tripped and slid underneath the ring, which led to several internet memes and reactions from fellow wrestlers. A couple of days later on Raw during a match between Baron Corbin and No Way Jose, O'Neil would try to amend for that mistake, but as he entered the ring, he slipped and fell from the apron. On the September 3 episode of Raw, Dana Brooke parted ways with Titus Worldwide after a mid-match coaching backfired, causing Brooke and Ember Moon to lose to Bayley and Sasha Banks. On the October 15 episode of Raw, Crews, without O'Neil, returned as a singles competitor, thus disbanding Titus Worldwide. On the November 2 episode of Main Event, O'Neil returned to singles competition, defeating Mojo Rawley.

==== Global Ambassador (2019–present) ====
O'Neil entered the 2019 men's Royal Rumble match at No. 11, but lasted a mere five seconds before being eliminated by Curt Hawkins. He then competed in the André the Giant Memorial Battle Royal at WrestleMania 35, eliminating Heath Slater before being eliminated by Mustafa Ali moments later. On the May 20 episode of Raw, O'Neil became the inaugural holder of the WWE 24/7 Championship. However, his reign ended in less than a minute when Robert Roode pinned him. On the May 4, 2020 episode of Raw, O'Neil competed in a Last Chance Gauntlet match to earn a spot in the men's Money in the Bank ladder match at Money in the Bank; he opened the competition against Bobby Lashley, who ultimately eliminated him. On the October 19 episode of Raw, O'Neil attempted to join The Hurt Business, only to be rejected and assaulted. Three weeks later, in his final match in WWE, he challenged Lashley - a member of The Hurt Business - for the United States Championship; O'Neil lost in just over one minute.

O'Neil co-hosted WrestleMania 37 alongside Hulk Hogan, and on April 6, 2021, O’Neil was the recipient of the Warrior Award. O'Neil appeared at WrestleMania 39 and commentated alongside Michael Cole and Corey Graves during the men's WrestleMania Showcase tag team match on Night One, and the WWE Intercontinental Championship match on Night Two. On September 22, 2026, his profile was moved to the alumni section of WWE's website, signaling that his in-ring career is over.

== Charity work ==
Bullard is heavily involved in charity work with various nonprofit groups in the Tampa Bay region. He has helped more than 245 student athletes across the Tampa Bay area get into college, lead corporate volunteers in reading books to children in after-school programs, used his story to inspire employees from all types of companies to volunteer, and taken part in United Way's Walking School Bus program in at-risk neighborhoods by escorting children to school on foot to make sure they get there on time and can gain access to a healthy breakfast. Bullard hosts an annual Joy of Giving event, where he hands out toys to more than 1,000 children. He also visits children with cancer in the hospital.

Bullard became the 261st Lightning Community Hero at a home game in 2012. Through that evening's game, in total, the Lightning Foundation had granted $13.2 million to more than 300 different non-profits in the Greater Tampa Bay area. In 2017, the founders announced that the Community Hero program will give away another $10 million over the next five seasons.

In honor of all of his charitable work, Bullard was inducted into the WWE Hall of Fame as part of the class of 2020 as a recipient of the Warrior Award. In the summer of 2021, a school in Tampa was named after him in his honor.

In April 2026, Bullard was named National Spokesperson for AMIkids.

== Other media ==
Bullard, as Titus O'Neil, made his video game debut as a playable character in WWE 2K14 and has since appeared in WWE 2K15, WWE 2K16, WWE 2K17, WWE 2K18, WWE 2K19, WWE 2K20, WWE 2K22, and WWE 2K23.

== Personal life ==
Bullard was married and has two sons named Thaddeus Jr. ("TJ") and Titus, and a daughter named Leah. He resides in Tampa, Florida, and is a devout Christian. He won the 2015 MEGA Dad Award for "Celebrity Dad of the Year". He is a good friend of Dave Bautista, who defended Bullard during his suspension from WWE in early 2016. His sons TJ Bullard and Titus Bullard both currently play football for his alma mater The University of Florida.

== Championships and accomplishments ==
- Florida Championship Wrestling
  - FCW Florida Tag Team Championship (1 time) – with Damien Sandow
- George Tragos/Lou Thesz Professional Wrestling Hall of Fame
  - Frank Gotch Award 2027
- Pro Wrestling Illustrated
  - Ranked No. 82 of the top 500 singles wrestlers in the PWI 500 in 2013
- Rolling Stone
  - Most Deserved Push (2015) As a member of The Prime Time Players
- Wrestling Observer Newsletter
  - Shad Gaspard/Jon Huber Memorial Award (2021)
  - Worst Feud of the Year (2016) vs. Darren Young
- WWE
  - WWE 24/7 Championship (1 time, inaugural)
  - WWE Tag Team Championship (1 time) – with Darren Young
  - WWE Year-End Award for Funniest Moment of the Year (2018) – Tripping over at Greatest Royal Rumble
  - WWE Hall of Fame (Class of 2020 – Warrior Award)
- Other awards
  - Boys & Girls Clubs of America Alumni Hall of Fame (class of 2015)
  - Horatio Alger Award (2026)
  - Sports Club of Tampa Hall of Fame (class of 2024)

== See also ==
- Florida Gators football, 1990–99
- List of Omega Psi Phi brothers
- List of University of Florida alumni
- List of gridiron football players who became professional wrestlers
