= John McGroarty (New York politician) =

American politician

John McGroarty (February 14, 1838 – December 23, 1911) was an American real estate dealer, politician, and saloonkeeper from New York.

== Life ==
McGroarty was born on February 14, 1838, in Brooklyn, New York.

After attending public school, McGroarty initially worked as a hatter. He later began working in the real estate business and became successful.

McGroarty was Alderman of the 9th Ward of Brooklyn from 1868 to 1874. In 1873, he was elected to the New York State Assembly as a Democrat over Republican John Oakey, representing the Kings County 9th District (Wards 9 and 21 of Brooklyn and the towns of Flatbush, Flatlands, Gravesend, New Lots, and New Utrecht). He served in the Assembly in 1874, 1875, 1876, and 1877.

In 1878, McGroarty was appointed Harbor Master. He held the post for two years, until Governor Alonzo B. Cornell appointed a Republican successor. In 1890, Governor David B. Hill appointed him Port Warden of the Harbor of New York. He held that office until 1895. He was in the saloon business for around twenty-six years, beginning in around 1884 when he purchased a saloon on Montague Street. The saloon was a popular gathering place for local politicians and proved successful. When the saloon burned down with the neighboring Brooklyn Academy of Music, he opened a new saloon on Court Street and ran it for six years. The saloon and his eyesight began to decline, and by 1910, rendered totally blind by cataracts, he closed the saloon.

McGroarty was a member of the Church of St. Joseph. His children were Jennie (wife of Dr. Edward J. Megarr), Alice, Margaret, and John C. (named after McGroarty's friend Senator John C. Jacobs).

McGroarty died at his daughter Jennie's home after a protracted illness from kidney trouble on December 23, 1911.

New York State Assembly
Preceded by John C. Jacobs	New York State Assembly; Kings County, 9th District; 1874–1877	Succeeded by John H. Bergen
