= James W. Booth =

American politician (1822–1876)

- Born: September 9, 1822; New York City, US
- Died: September 14, 1876 (aged 54); Nyack, New York, US

James Wadsworth Booth (September 9, 1822 New York City – September 14, 1876 Nyack, New York) was an American politician from New York.

== Life ==
Booth attended schools in New York City, and became a dyer and manufacturer of cotton goods.

He was a member of the Board of Fire Commissioners in 1865, but resigned after three months. In 1873, he was elected by the State Legislature as a Regent of the University of the State of New York.

He was a member of the New York State Senate (5th D.) from 1874 until his death, sitting in the 97th, 98th and 99th New York State Legislatures.

Booth died from heart disease at the house of his brother-in-law in Nyack, New York, on September 14, 1876, at age 54.

== Sources ==
- The Fire Commissioners Sworn In in NYT on May 4, 1865
- The Fire Department in NYT on September 5, 1865
- NOMINATION OF REGENT OF THE UNIVERSITY in NYT on May 14, 1873

New York State Senate
Preceded by Erastus C. Benedict	New York State Senate; 5th District; 1874–1876	Succeeded by Alfred Wagstaff Jr.
