= Joseph Hoffman Jr. =

- Born: November 1, 1898; Charleston, South Carolina
- Died: 1988 (aged 89–90)
- Burial place: Friendly Union Cemetery, Charleston, South Carolina
- Education: Howard University; Meharry Medical College (MD)
- Occupation: Medical doctor
- Organizations: Knights of Peter Claver; Omega Psi Phi
- Spouse: Ellen Cecilia Wiley (m. 1937)

Joseph "Irvine" Hoffman Jr. (November 1, 1898 – August, 1988) was an African American physician who practiced in the Charleston, South Carolina area for over 50 years.

== Early life and career ==
Hoffman was born in 1898 to Daisy Madeleine Horsey and Joseph Hoffman Sr., a butcher who owned a grocery store in Charleston, South Carolina.

Hoffman attended primary school at St. Peters Catholic School, and attended high school the Avery Normal Institute. After graduating from Avery, he pursued a college education at Howard University and Meharry Medical College, where he studied to become a physician.

After graduating with his M.D. from Merharry, Hoffman completed his residency at Freedman's Hospital in Washington. After his residency, he returned to Charleston and started his own practice on Calhoun St. in 1929. He later also practiced in an office on John's Island, as well as practicing as a school physician at Simonton and Burke High Schools.

According to Nora Hoffman-Davis, Hoffman had a largely lower-class client base. He frequently had non-traditional doctor-patient relationships due to his acceptance of spiritual beliefs and alternative medicine, as well as accepting crops and farm animals as payment.

== Personal life ==
=== Family life ===
Hoffman married Ellen Cecilia Wiley, a music teacher at the Avery Institute, through Helen Cox, in 1937. Him and his wife conceived a son and a daughter, Nora Hoffman-Davis and Joseph Hoffman III. Joseph Hoffman III also pursued his education at Howard University, and is a practicing orthopedic surgeon in Atlanta, Georgia.

=== Activism and community involvement ===
In their free time, Hoffman and Wiley dedicated themselves to their community and were active in civic groups. Hoffman was a member of the Omega Psi Phi Fraternity, and the Knights of Peter Claver at St. Patrick's Church, later co-founding the Athenians Men's Club and serving as a member of the Owls Whist Club. They often provided shelter and space for community and church members.

In 1963, Hoffman returned to Washington, D.C. to attend Martin Luther King Jr.'s "I Have a Dream" speech during the March on Washington. Later, in 1969, he posted bond to support student activists who went on strike at MUSC hospitals.
