= Willard Hodges =

American politician

Willard Hodges (May 25, 1820- July 5, 1889) was an American politician.

Hodges, the youngest son of Erastus and Laura (Loomis) Hodges, was born in Torrington, Connecticut, May 25, 1820. His father, a prosperous merchant in Torrington, also cultivated a farm; and there the son acquired a taste for farming which determined his future life. In 1841 he entered Williams College, and two years later removed to Yale College. He remained in Torrington after graduation in 1845, a consequence of the poor health of his father, who died in 1847. On August 28, 1848, he was married to Jane A., youngest daughter of Gurdon Bradley, of Fairfield, Herkimer County, N. Y., and in 1849 he bought a farm near Rochester, N. Y., where he resided until his death. In accordance with his early plans, farming was his main business, and he exerted himself vigorously for the improvement of agriculture in the vicinity. He was President of the County Agricultural Society in 1856 and 1857. He was elected as a Republican to the lower house of the New York State Legislature in 1875, and again in 1876, but declined a further nomination. He took an active part otherwise in public affairs, and was a frequent contributor to the press.

After being disabled by a disease of the heart from active life for a year or more, he died at his residence in Rochester, July 5, 1889, in his 70th year.

His children were two sons and four daughters; the elder son died in childhood, and the younger graduated from Yale in 1877.

New York State Assembly
Preceded by Richard D. Cole	New York State Assembly; Monroe County, 1st District; 1876-1877	Succeeded by Albert C. Hobbie
