= Durey =

Durey is a surname. Notable people with the surname include:

- Louis Durey (1888–1979), French composer
- Cyrus Durey (1864–1933), American politician from New York
- Michael Durey, biographer of James T. Callender
- Lincoln Durey, creator of EmperorLinux
