= 98th New York State Legislature =

New York state legislative session

←	97th	99th	→
- The Old State Capitol (1879)

Overview
- Legislative body: New York State Legislature
- Jurisdiction: New York, United States
- Term: January 1 – December 31, 1875

Senate
- Members: 32
- President: Lt. Gov. William Dorsheimer (D)
- Temporary President: William H. Robertson (R)
- Party control: Republican (18-12-2)

Assembly
- Members: 128
- Speaker: Jeremiah McGuire (D)
- Party control: Democratic (75-53)

Sessions
- 1st: January 5 – May 22, 1875

The 98th New York State Legislature, consisting of the New York State Senate and the New York State Assembly, met from January 5 to May 22, 1875, during the first year of Samuel J. Tilden's governorship, in Albany.

== Background ==
Under the provisions of the New York Constitution of 1846, 32 Senators and 128 assemblymen were elected in single-seat districts; senators for a two-year term, assemblymen for a one-year term. The senatorial districts were made up of entire counties, except New York County (five districts) and Kings County (two districts). The Assembly districts were made up of entire towns, or city wards, forming a contiguous area, all within the same county.

At this time there were two major political parties: the Republican Party and the Democratic Party. The Prohibition Party appeared at this time, nominating Ex-Governor Myron H. Clark — who had urged the Legislature to enact Prohibition in New York in 1853, but the law was declared unconstitutional by the New York Court of Appeals — for Governor.

== Elections ==
The 1874 New York state election was held on November 3. Democrats Samuel J. Tilden and William Dorsheimer were elected Governor and Lieutenant Governor, defeating the incumbent Republicans John A. Dix and John C. Robinson. The other three statewide elective offices up for election were also carried by the Democrats. The approximate party strength at this election, as expressed by the vote for Governor, was: Democratic 416,000; Republican 366,000; and Prohibition 12,000.

== Sessions ==
The Legislature met for the regular session at the Old State Capitol in Albany on January 5, 1875; and adjourned on May 22.

Jeremiah McGuire (D) was elected Speaker.

On January 20, the Legislature elected Francis Kernan (D) to succeed U.S. Senator Reuben E. Fenton (R) for a six-year term, beginning on March 4, 1875.

== State Senate ==
=== Districts ===
- 1st District: Queens, Richmond and Suffolk counties
- 2nd District: 1st, 2nd, 3rd, 4th, 5th, 7th, 11th, 13th, 15th, 19th and 20th wards of the City of Brooklyn
- 3rd District: 6th, 8th, 9th, 10th, 12th, 14th, 16th, 17th and 18th wards of the City of Brooklyn; and all towns in Kings County
- 4th District: 1st, 2nd, 3rd, 4th, 5th, 6th, 7th, 13th and 14th wards of New York City
- 5th District: 8th, 9th, 15th and 16th wards of New York City
- 6th District: 10th, 11th and 17th wards of New York City
- 7th District: 18th, 20th and 21st wards of New York City
- 8th District: 12th, 19th and 22nd wards of New York City
- 9th District: Putnam, Rockland and Westchester counties
- 10th District: Orange and Sullivan counties
- 11th District: Columbia and Dutchess counties
- 12th District: Rensselaer and Washington counties
- 13th District: Albany County
- 14th District: Greene and Ulster counties
- 15th District: Fulton, Hamilton, Montgomery, Saratoga and Schenectady counties
- 16th District: Clinton, Essex and Warren counties
- 17th District: Franklin and St. Lawrence counties
- 18th District: Jefferson and Lewis counties
- 19th District: Oneida County
- 20th District: Herkimer and Otsego counties
- 21st District: Madison and Oswego counties
- 22nd District: Onondaga and Cortland counties
- 23rd District: Chenango, Delaware and Schoharie counties
- 24th District: Broome, Tompkins and Tioga counties
- 25th District: Cayuga and Wayne counties
- 26th District: Ontario, Seneca and Yates counties
- 27th District: Chemung, Schuyler and Steuben counties
- 28th District: Monroe County
- 29th District: Genesee, Niagara and Orleans counties
- 30th District: Allegany, Livingston and Wyoming counties
- 31st District: Erie County
- 32nd District: Cattaraugus and Chautauqua counties
Note: There are now 62 counties in the State of New York. The counties which are not mentioned in this list had not yet been established, or sufficiently organized, the area being included in one or more of the abovementioned counties.

=== Members ===
The asterisk (*) denotes members of the previous Legislature who continued in office as members of this Legislature.

District	Senator	Party	Notes
1st	John A. King*	Republican	
2nd	John W. Coe*	Lib. Rep./Dem.	
3rd	John C. Jacobs*	Democrat	
4th	John Fox*	Democrat	
5th	James W. Booth*	Republican	
6th	Jacob A. Gross*	Democrat	
7th	Thomas A. Ledwith*	Democrat	
8th	Hugh H. Moore*	Democrat	unsuccessfully contested by Walter S. Pinckney (R)
9th	William H. Robertson*	Republican	President pro tempore
10th	Edward M. Madden*	Republican	
11th	Benjamin Ray*	Democrat	
12th	Roswell A. Parmenter*	Democrat	
13th	Jesse C. Dayton*	Democrat	
14th	Henry C. Connelly*	Republican	
15th	Webster Wagner*	Republican	
16th	Franklin W. Tobey*	Republican	
17th	Wells S. Dickinson*	Republican	
18th	Andrew C. Middleton	Ind./Lib. Rep./Dem.	
19th	Samuel S. Lowery*	Republican	
20th	Archibald C. McGowan*	Republican	
21st	Charles Kellogg*	Republican	
22nd	Daniel P. Wood*	Republican	
23rd	James G. Thompson*	Republican	
24th	John H. Selkreg*	Republican	
25th	William B. Woodin*	Republican	
26th	William Johnson*	Democrat	died on October 10, 1875
27th	George B. Bradley*	Democrat	
28th	Jarvis Lord*	Democrat	
29th	Dan H. Cole*	Republican	
30th	Abijah J. Wellman*	Republican	
31st	Albert P. Laning	Democrat	elected to fill vacancy, in place of John Ganson
32nd	Albert G. Dow*	Republican	

=== Employees ===
- Clerk: Henry A. Glidden
- Sergeant-at-Arms: Daniel K. Schram
- Doorkeeper: Frederick M. Burton

== State Assembly ==
=== Assemblymen ===
The asterisk (*) denotes members of the previous Legislature who continued as members of this Legislature.

District		Assemblymen	Party	Notes
Albany	1st	Peter Slingerland	Republican	
Albany	2nd	Leopold C. G. Kshinka*	Democrat	
Albany	3rd	Francis W. Vosburgh	Democrat	
Albany	4th	Waters W. Braman*	Republican	
Allegany		Orrin T. Stacy*	Republican	
Broome		George Sherwood*	Republican	
Cattaraugus	1st	Commodore P. Vedder*	Republican	
Cattaraugus	2nd	Samuel Scudder	Lib. Rep./Dem.	
Cayuga	1st	Charles S. Beardsley	Democrat	
Cayuga	2nd	Erastus H. Hussey*	Republican	
Chautauqua	1st	Otis D. Hinckley	Republican	
Chautauqua	2nd	Obed Edson	Democrat	
Chemung		Jeremiah McGuire	Democrat	elected Speaker
Chenango		Daniel M. Holmes	Democrat	
Clinton		Shepard P. Bowen	Republican	
Columbia	1st	Henry Lawrence*	Democrat	
Columbia	2nd	Alonzo H. Farrar*	Republican	
Cortland		Daniel E. Whitmore	Republican	
Delaware	1st	Warren G. Willis	Republican	
Delaware	2nd	George G. Decker	Republican	
Dutchess	1st	James Mackin*	Democrat	
Dutchess	2nd	Benjamin S. Broas	Democrat	
Erie	1st	Patrick Hanrahan*	Democrat	
Erie	2nd	William W. Lawson	Republican	
Erie	3rd	Edward Gallagher	Republican	
Erie	4th	Harry B. Ransom	Democrat	
Erie	5th	William Alfred Johnson	Republican	
Essex		William E. Calkins	Republican	
Franklin		John P. Badger*	Republican	
Fulton and Hamilton		George W. Fay	Republican	
Genesee		Newton H. Green	Republican	
Greene		Benjamin F. Barkley	Democrat	
Herkimer		Warner Miller*	Republican	
Jefferson	1st	John F. Peck	Republican	
Jefferson	2nd	George E. Yost	Republican	
Kings	1st	Daniel Bradley	Ind. Dem.	
Kings	2nd	John R. Kennaday	Democrat	
Kings	3rd	Michael J. Coffey*	Democrat	
Kings	4th	Tunis V. P. Talmage	Democrat	
Kings	5th	John H. Burtis	Republican	
Kings	6th	Jacob Worth*	Republican	
Kings	7th	vacant	Democrat	Assemblyman-elect Stephen J. Colahan died on December 10, 1874
Kings	7th	Michael O'Keefe	Democrat	elected to fill vacancy
Kings	8th	Bernard Silverman	Democrat	
Kings	9th	John McGroarty*	Democrat	
Lewis		James A. Merwin	Democrat	
Livingston		James Faulkner Jr.	Democrat	
Madison	1st	D. Gerry Wellington	Republican	
Madison	2nd	George Berry	Democrat	
Monroe	1st	Richard D. Cole	Democrat	
Monroe	2nd	George Taylor*	Democrat	
Monroe	3rd	Josiah Rich	Democrat	
Montgomery		Martin Schenck	Democrat	
New York	1st	Nicholas Muller	Democrat	
New York	2nd	William P. Kirk*	Democrat	
New York	3rd	John C. Brogan	Democrat	
New York	4th	Charles Reilly	Democrat	
New York	5th	Warren C. Bennett*	Democrat	
New York	6th	Timothy J. Campbell	Democrat	
New York	7th	Frederick W. Seward	Republican	
New York	8th	George A. Stauf	Democrat	
New York	9th	William H. Gedney	Republican	
New York	10th	Louis C. Waehner*	Democrat	
New York	11th	Knox McAfee*	Republican	
New York	12th	John Keenan	Democrat	
New York	13th	A. Nelson Beach	Democrat	
New York	14th	James Daly*	Democrat	
New York	15th	Thomas Costigan	Democrat	
New York	16th	John T. McGowan	Democrat	
New York	17th	Leo C. Dessar	Democrat	
New York	18th	Thomas Cooper Campbell	Democrat	
New York	19th	Germain Hauschel	Democrat	
New York	20th	Jacob Hess	Republican	
New York	21st	John W. Smith	Democrat	
Niagara	1st	Artemas W. Comstock*	Republican	
Niagara	2nd	Orville C. Bordwell*	Republican	
Oneida	1st	Richard U. Sherman	Lib. Rep./Dem.	
Oneida	2nd	Silas T. Ives	Democrat	
Oneida	3rd	Edward Lewis	Democrat	
Oneida	4th	Harrison Lillybridge	Republican	
Onondaga	1st	Thomas G. Alvord*	Republican	
Onondaga	2nd	George Barrow*	Republican	
Onondaga	3rd	Charles Tremain	Republican	
Ontario	1st	Stephen H. Hammond*	Democrat	
Ontario	2nd	Cyrillo S. Lincoln*	Republican	
Orange	1st	James W. Miller	Democrat	
Orange	2nd	Joseph D. Friend	Democrat	
Orleans		John N. Wetherbee	Republican	died on March 22, 1875
Oswego	1st	Alanson S. Page	Democrat	
Oswego	2nd	Willard Johnson*	Democrat	
Oswego	3rd	Henry J. Daggett	Republican	
Otsego	1st	William H. Ely*	Democrat	
Otsego	2nd	James E. Cooke	Democrat	
Putnam		William H. Christopher	Democrat	
Queens	1st	L. Bradford Prince*	Republican	
Queens	2nd	James M. Oakley*	Democrat	
Rensselaer	1st	William V. Cleary*	Democrat	
Rensselaer	2nd	William F. Taylor	Republican	
Rensselaer	3rd	Jacob M. Witbeck*	Democrat	
Richmond		Stephen D. Stephens Jr.*	Democrat	
Rockland		James C. Brown	Democrat	
St. Lawrence	1st	Seth G. Pope*	Republican	
St. Lawrence	2nd	A. Barton Hepburn	Republican	
St. Lawrence	3rd	Jonah Sanford*	Republican	
Saratoga	1st	George West*	Republican	
Saratoga	2nd	Nathaniel M. Houghton	Republican	
Schenectady		Samuel T. Benedict	Democrat	
Schoharie		John M. Roscoe	Democrat	
Schuyler		William H. Fish	Democrat	
Seneca		William Hogan	Democrat	
Steuben	1st	Stephen D. Shattuck*	Democrat	
Steuben	2nd	Lucius C. Pierson	Democrat	
Suffolk		Nathan D. Petty*	Republican	
Sullivan		Adolphus E. Wenzel	Democrat	
Tioga		James Bishop	Republican	
Tompkins		George W. Schuyler	Lib. Rep./Dem.	
Ulster	1st	John Fream	Democrat	
Ulster	2nd	Jacob D. Wurts	Democrat	
Ulster	3rd	Charles H. Krack	Democrat	
Warren		Stephen Griffin	Democrat	
Washington	1st	Alexander B. Law*	Republican	
Washington	2nd	Emerson E. Davis*	Democrat	
Wayne	1st	William H. Clark	Republican	
Wayne	2nd	Allen S. Russell	Republican	
Westchester	1st	Dennis R. Shiel	Democrat	
Westchester	2nd	Charles M. Schieffelin	Democrat	
Westchester	3rd	James W. Husted*	Republican	
Wyoming		Samuel W. Tewksbury*	Republican	
Yates		Hanford Struble	Republican	

=== Employees ===
- Clerk: Hiram Calkins
- Sergeant-at-Arms: Edward A. Brown
- Doorkeeper: George W. Irish
- Stenographer: Spencer C. Rodgers

== Sources ==
- Civil List and Constitutional History of the Colony and State of New York compiled by Edgar Albert Werner (1884; see pg. 276 for Senate districts; pg. 290 for senators; pg. 298–304 for Assembly districts; and pg. 375 for assemblymen)
- Assemblymen Elected in Albany Evening Times on November 6, 1874
- Life Sketches of Government Officers and Members of the Legislature of the State of New York in 1875 by W. H. McElroy and Alexander McBride [e-book]
