= Senator Doolittle (disambiguation) =

James Rood Doolittle (1815–1897) was a U.S. Senator from Wisconsin from 1857 to 1869. Senator Doolittle may also refer to:

- Benjamin Doolittle (1825–1895), New York State Senate
- John Doolittle (born 1950), California State Senate
