= James Donahue =

James Donahue may refer to:

- James Donahue (athlete), American pentathlete
- James Paul Donahue Jr., heir to the Woolworth estate and New York City socialite
- James F. Donahue, American merchant and politician from New York
- Jim Donahue, American Major League Baseball player
