= Hugh Moore =

Hugh Moore may refer to:

- Hugh Moore (businessman) (1887–1972), founder of the Dixie Cup Company
- Hugh Moore (police officer) (1929–1993), corrupt former commander of the City of London Police
- Hugh H. Moore (1844–?), New York politician
