= John Coe =

John Coe may refer to:

- Jonas Coe (1805–1864), American-born naval commander
- John D. Coe (1755–1824), American farmer and politician from New York
- John W. Coe (1839–1890), American politician from New York
