= Senator Middleton =

Senator Middleton may refer to:

- Andrew C. Middleton (1824–1909), New York State Senate
- Clyde Middleton (1928–2019), Kentucky State Senate
- Henry Middleton (governor) (1770–1846), South Carolina State Senate
- Henry Middleton (1717–1784), South Carolina State Senate
- Mayes Middleton (born 1981), Texas State Senate
- Thomas M. Middleton (born 1945), Maryland State Senate
