= Harmon S. Conger =

19th-century American politician (1816–1882)

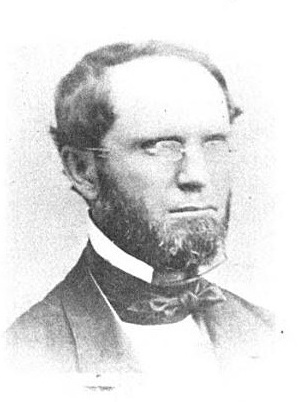

Wisconsin Circuit Judge for the 12th Circuit
- In office 1870 – October 22, 1882
- Preceded by: New circuit established
- Succeeded by: John R. Bennett

Member of the U.S. House of Representatives from New York's 25th district
- In office March 4, 1847 – March 3, 1851
- Preceded by: George O. Rathbun
- Succeeded by: Thomas Y. Howe Jr.

Personal details
- Born: April 9, 1816 Freetown, New York, U.S.
- Died: October 22, 1882 (aged 66) Janesville, Wisconsin, U.S.
- Party: Whig; Republican

Harmon Sweatland Conger (April 9, 1816 – October 22, 1882) was an American lawyer, partisan newspaper publisher, Whig politician, and Wisconsin pioneer. He served two terms in the U.S. House of Representatives, representing New York's 25th congressional district from 1847 to 1851. He subsequently served as a Wisconsin circuit court judge in southern Wisconsin from 1870 until his death in 1882.

== Life and career ==
Born in Freetown, New York, Conger attended the local academy at Cortland in 1833. He studied law with Horatio Ballard, was admitted to the bar in 1844 and commenced practice in Cortland, New York.

Conger was also editor and owner of a newspaper, the Cortland County Whig, from 1840 to 1845.

He was elected as a Whig to the Thirtieth and Thirty-first Congresses, serving from March 4, 1847 to March 3, 1851. After his term in Congress, Conger resumed the practice of law in Cortland.

He moved to Janesville, Wisconsin, in 1855 and continued the practice of law. By now a Republican, Conger was elected Judge of the Wisconsin Circuit Court in 1870. He was reelected in 1876 and served until his death.

== Death and burial ==
Conger died in Janesville October 22, 1882. He was interred in Oak Hill Cemetery.

== Electoral history ==
New York's 25th congressional district election, 1846
Party	Candidate	Votes	%
Whig	Harmon Conger	6,253	47.73
Democratic	William Shankland	6,036	46.08
Liberty	John S. Boyd	811	6.19
Total votes		13,100	100.00
Whig gain from Democratic			

New York's 25th congressional district election, 1848
Party	Candidate	Votes	%
Whig	Harmon Conger (incumbent)	6,732	46.88
Free Soil	Horatio Ballard	5,747	40.02
Democratic	Frederick Hyde	1,870	13.02
Liberty	Samuel R. Ward	10	0.07
Total votes		14,359	100.00
Whig hold			

U.S. House of Representatives
Preceded by George O. Rathbun	Member of the U.S. House of Representatives from New York's 25th congressional district 1847–1851	Succeeded by Thomas Y. Howe, Jr.
