= Edgar L. Ryder =

American journalist, lawyer, and politician (1860 – 1936)

Edgar Lee Ryder (February 13, 1860 – June 7, 1936) was an American journalist, lawyer, and politician from New York.

== Life ==
Ryder was born on February 13, 1860, in Ossining, New York, the son of dry goods merchant William E. Ryder and Josephine Urmy.

Ryder attended public school and went to a military academy prior to attending Columbia College. He was a classmate of Nicholas Murray Butler and graduated from Columbia in 1882. He then moved to Minnesota and worked as a newspaper reporter in Minneapolis, St. Paul, and Duluth. In 1885, he co-founded the Northwest Trade, a commercial publication, in Minneapolis. He served as the paper's publisher until 1889, when he sold out to his partner and returned to Ossining. He then began studying law and was admitted to the bar in 1891. He would practice law in Ossining and White Plains as a trial lawyer until his death.

In 1892, Ryder was elected to the New York State Assembly as a Democrat, representing the Westchester County 3rd District. He served in the Assembly in 1893 and 1894. While in the Assembly, he submitted bills related to the employment of State prison convicts, appropriations for the enlargement of Sing Sing, and permitting the employment of Christian Scientists as physicians. In the 1902 New York state election, he ran for Governor on an Independent-Democratic ticket, and while he lost his candidacy helped get Republican candidate Benjamin B. Odell elected Governor. He later became a supporter of the single tax theory and spoke throughout the state on behalf of the Henry George program.

Ryder was a Unitarian. He was a member of the Freemasons and the Titans Society. In 1896, he married Sarah Aileen Sullivan of Haverstraw. Their daughter was Geraldine Van Cortlandt, who married Robert McBryde Purvis.

Ryder died in the Medical Arts Center in New York City following an operation on June 7, 1936. He was buried in the family plot in the Dale Cemetery.

New York State Assembly
Preceded by James W. Husted	New York State Assembly; Westchester County, 3rd District; 1893–1894	Succeeded by James W. Husted
