= William H. Brand =

American politician

William H. Brand (April 20, 1824 Leonardsville, Madison County, New York – 1891) was an American merchant and politician from New York.

== Life ==
He attended the district schools and the Oneida Institute. Then he taught school, became a clerk in a country store, and later opened his own business.

He was a member of the New York State Assembly (Madison Co., 1st D.) in 1862 and 1863; Supervisor of the Town of Brookfield from 1867 to 1869; and a member of the New York State Senate (21st D.) in 1870 and 1871.

He was buried at the Seventh Day Baptist Cemetery in Leonardsville.

== Sources ==
- The New York Civil List compiled by Franklin Benjamin Hough, Stephen C. Hutchins and Edgar Albert Werner (1870; pg. 444, 496 and 498)
- Life Sketches of Executive Officers, and Members of the Legislature of the State of New York, Vol. III by H. H. Boone & Theodore P. Cook (1870; pg. 64ff)

New York State Assembly
Preceded by Orrin B. Lord	New York State Assembly; Madison County, 1st District; 1862–1863	Succeeded by John W. Lippitt
New York State Senate
Preceded by Abner C. Mattoon	New York State Senate; 21st District; 1870–1871	Succeeded by William Foster
