= Bernard Silverman (politician) =

American politician

Bernard Silverman (August 30, 1838 – May 13, 1898) was an American politician from New York.

== Life ==
Silverman was born on August 30, 1838, in New York City, New York. His parents were German immigrants from Bavaria who immigrated to America a year before he was born.

Silverman attended public school and the Brooklyn City Institute. He worked as a bookkeeper after reaching his majority. He also worked as a woolen merchant in Manhattan at one point.

Silverman was active with the Democratic Party since 1859, initially in New York City and later in Brooklyn. In 1874, he was elected to the New York State Assembly as a Democrat, representing the Kings County 8th District (Wards 15, 17, and 18 of Brooklyn). He served in the Assembly in 1875.

Silverman later worked as a clerk in the Ewen Street Police Court in Williamsburg under Justice Watson. He was retained under Justices Laimbeer and Lemon.

Silverman was a Master of the Mount Neboh Lodge of the Freemasons and was a member of the Royal Arch Masonry. His wife died two years before him. He had three sons (two of whom worked in Chicago, Illinois) and a daughter, Dr. Hattie Ticehurst.

Silverman died at home after a brief illness from a complication of diseases on May 13, 1898. He was buried in Salem Fields Cemetery.

New York State Assembly
Preceded by George C. Bennett	New York State Assembly; Kings County, 8th District; 1875	Succeeded by Adrian M. Suydam
