= James W. Husted (speaker) =

American politician (1833–1892)

James William Husted I
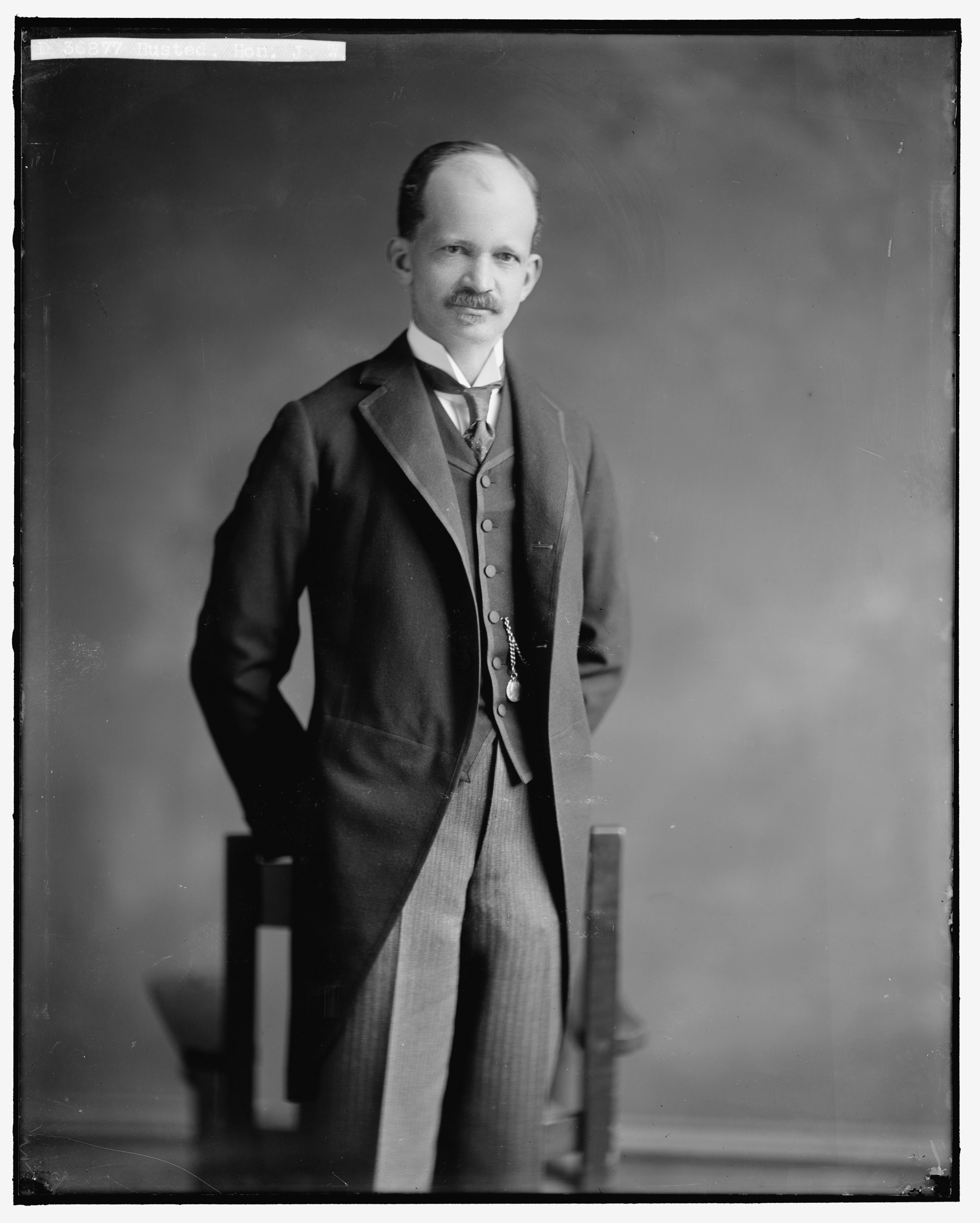
- Born: October 31, 1833; Bedford, New York
- Died: September 25, 1892 (aged 58); Peekskill, New York
- Education: Yale College (1854)
- Occupations: Lawyer, politician
- Children: James William Husted II

Signature
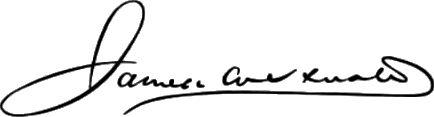

James William Husted (October 31, 1833 – September 25, 1892) was an American lawyer and politician, elected six times as Speaker of the New York State Assembly during his 22 years of service there. During his political career, he became known as the "Bald Eagle of Westchester".

== Biography ==
He was educated at Bedford Academy, and graduated from Yale College in 1854. Then he studied law with Edward Wells at Peekskill, New York and was admitted to the bar in 1857. He had become a member of the Know Nothing party, and in 1855, he was chosen Town Superintendent of Public Schools in Peekskill. In 1858, he was elected School Commissioner of Westchester County on the Know Nothing ticket. After the majority of the Know Nothings amalgamated with the Democratic Party in 1859, Husted published a vigorous protest against this "betrayal of the principles upon which the Know Nothing Party was founded", and joined the Republican Party. Before running for office, Husted served in several political appointee positions, being appointed a Deputy Superintendent of the State Insurance Department in 1860, a Harbormaster of New York in 1862, and later a Deputy Collector of the port.

== Marriage and family ==
Husted married and had the following children: Thomas D. Husted, James William Husted, Jr., Helen S. Husted and Hattie Husted. The younger James became a politician like his father, eventually elected to four successive terms as a US Congressman from New York.

== Political career ==
He was a member of the New York State Assembly (Westchester Co., 3rd D.) in 1869, 1870, 1871, 1872, 1873, 1874, 1875, 1876, 1877 and 1878. He was a member of the State Assembly (Rockland Co.) in 1879 and 1880. He was again a member of the State Assembly (Westchester Co., 3rd D.) in 1881, 1884, 1885, 1886, 1887, 1888, 1889, 1890, 1891 and 1892. He was elected six times Speaker: in 1874, 1876, 1878, 1886, 1887 and 1890, a record at the time. He was Minority Leader in 1892.

In March 1873, Governor John Adams Dix appointed him Major-General of the Fifth Division of the National Guard. Prior to this appointment, Husted had been Judge Advocate on the staff of the Seventh Brigade of the State Militia. He commanded the division for several years, and after that, was commonly referred to as General Husted.

In 1874, as Junior Grand Warden, Husted performed the Masonic burial rite at the interment of New York City Police Commissioner Henry Smith in Amsterdam, New York, after Methodist services had taken place. It was a major public funeral, with numerous Masons and members of the New York State legislature. In 1876, he became Grand Master of the Masonic Grand Lodge of New York.

His long political career, military service and Masonic and other associations enabled him to build many successful business interests. His resulting wealth enabled him to build a "family mansion" in Peekskill.

In 1881, Husted ran for New York State Treasurer but was defeated by Democrat Robert A. Maxwell; he was the only Republican who was not elected that year.

In June 1892, he was a delegate to the Republican National Convention at Minneapolis. Husted returned from the convention already ill and died on September 25, 1892, of heart disease and kidney disease. He was buried at the Hillside Cemetery in Peekskill, New York.

New York State Assembly
Preceded by Henry C. Nelson	New York State Assembly; Westchester County, 3rd District; 1869–1878	Succeeded by David W. Travis
Preceded by James M. Nelson	New York State Assembly; Rockland County; 1879–1880	Succeeded by John Cleary
Preceded by David W. Travis	New York State Assembly; Westchester County, 3rd District; 1881	Succeeded by George W. Robertson
Preceded by John Hoag	New York State Assembly; Westchester County, 3rd District; 1884–1892	Succeeded by Edgar L. Ryder
Political offices
Preceded by Alonzo B. Cornell	Speaker of the New York State Assembly; 1874	Succeeded by Jeremiah McGuire
Preceded by Jeremiah McGuire	Speaker of the New York State Assembly; 1876	Succeeded by George B. Sloan
Preceded by George B. Sloan	Speaker of the New York State Assembly; 1878	Succeeded by Thomas G. Alvord
Preceded by George Z. Erwin	Speaker of the New York State Assembly; 1886–1887	Succeeded by Fremont Cole
Preceded by Fremont Cole	Speaker of the New York State Assembly; 1890	Succeeded by William F. Sheehan
Preceded by Milo M. Acker	Minority Leader in the New York State Assembly; 1892	Succeeded by George R. Malby
Masonic offices
Preceded by Ellwood E. Thorne	Grand Master of the Grand Lodge of New York; 1876	Succeeded by Joseph J. Couch
