= Benjamin I. Taylor =

American politician

Benjamin Taylor
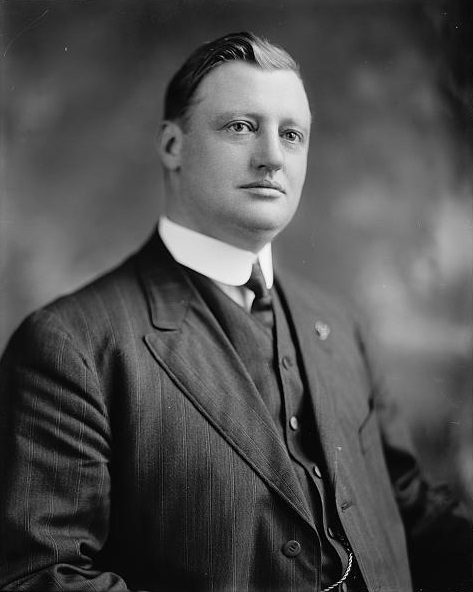

Member of the U.S. House of Representatives from New York's 25th district
- In office March 4, 1913 – March 3, 1915
- Preceded by: Theron Akin
- Succeeded by: James W. Husted

Personal details
- Born: Benjamin Irving Taylor; December 21, 1877 New York City, U.S.
- Died: September 5, 1946 (aged 68) Harrison, New York, U.S.
- Resting place: Kensico Cemetery, Valhalla, New York, U.S.
- Party: Democratic

Benjamin Irving Taylor (December 21, 1877 – September 5, 1946) was an American lawyer and politician who served one term as a U.S. representative from New York from 1913 to 1915.

== Biography ==
Born in New York City, Taylor attended public schools and graduated from high school in New Rochelle, New York. He earned a degree from Columbia Law School in New York City in 1899. He was admitted to the bar the same year and commenced practice in Port Chester, New York.

=== Political career ===
Taylor served as supervisor of Harrison, New York, from 1905 to 1913. He was elected as a Democrat to the Sixty-third Congress (March 4, 1913 – March 3, 1915). He was an unsuccessful candidate for reelection in 1914 to the Sixty-fourth Congress.

=== Later career and death ===
After leaving Congress, Taylor resumed the practice of law in Port Chester, New York.

Taylor was again elected supervisor of Harrison in 1921, and served in that capacity, with the exception of two years, until December 1945.

He died in Harrison, New York, September 5, 1946, and was interred in Kensico Cemetery, Valhalla, New York.

== Sources ==
- United States Congress. "Benjamin I. Taylor (id: T000066)". Biographical Directory of the United States Congress.

U.S. House of Representatives
Preceded by Theron Akin	Member of the U.S. House of Representatives from New York's 25th congressional district March 4, 1913 – March 3, 1915	Succeeded by James W. Husted
