= John J. Allen (New York politician) =

American lawyer and politician

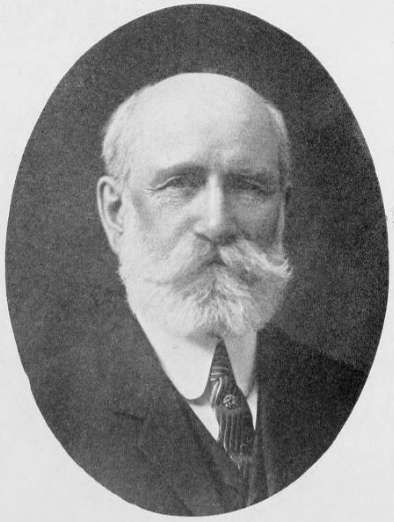

Member of the New York State Assembly
- In office 1874
- Constituency: Kings County, 2nd District

Personal details
- Born: John Johnson Allen; August 4, 1842 Utica, New York, US
- Died: January 20, 1926 (aged 83) Brooklyn, New York, US
- Resting place: Lakeview Cemetery
- Party: Republican
- Spouse: Louisa A. Shaler (m. 1870)
- Children: 3
- Education: University of Vermont; Columbia Law School
- Occupation: Lawyer, politician

John Johnson Allen (August 4, 1842 – January 20, 1926) was an American lawyer and politician from New York.

== Life ==
Allen was born on August 4, 1842, in Utica, New York, the son of Joseph and Eliza R. (Johnson) Allen. His father was chief engineer of the Erie Canal and consulting engineer of the Erie Railroad and the Chicago and North Western Railroad. His maternal grandfather, John Johnson, was Surveyor-General of Vermont. He was a descendant of Samuel Allen and Myles Standish.

Allen moved to Vermont with his parents when he was young. He attended the City Academy in Burlington, and when he was sixteen he entered the University of Vermont. He graduated from there with honors in 1862. He then began studying law, and while studying he accepted a position on the staff of the Provost Marshal in New York City. In the bureau's last year, he was in charge of the Fourth Provost District. After the bureau was abolished, he resumed his law studies and entered Columbia Law School, graduating from there with honors in 1866. Shortly after his graduation, he was appointed Assistant United States Attorney for the Eastern District of New York under Benjamin D. Silliman. He continued to hold the position under Silliman's successor Benjamin F. Tracy. He resigned in March 1873, after which he began practicing law in Brooklyn.

In 1873, Allen was elected to the New York State Assembly as a Republican, representing the Kings County 2nd District (Wards 3, 4, and 11 of Brooklyn). He served in the Assembly in 1874. In 1874, the United States Circuit Court appointed him U.S. Chief Supervisor of Elections for the Eastern District of New York, which included Long Island and Staten Island. He served in that position until 1894. He was also a United States commissioner from 1874 to 1899, and a master in chancery for over 25 years. He was a director of different corporations, and had a summer homestead in Burlington owned by his family for over a century.

In 1920, the University of Vermont gave Allen an honorary LL.D. along with Massachusetts Governor Calvin Coolidge. He was president of the Vermont Society of Brooklyn and the Brooklyn Republican Club. He was a member of Phi Beta Kappa, Sigma Phi, the New England Society of New York, the National Geographic Society, the Union League Club. He was also deputy governor of the General Society of Colonial Wars. In 1870, he married Louisa A. Shaler of Pittsburgh, Pennsylvania. They had three daughters.

Allen died of pneumonia at his home at 129 Columbia Heights on January 20, 1926. He was buried in the family plot in Lakeview Cemetery in Burlington, Vermont.

New York State Assembly
Preceded by David C. Van Cott	New York State Assembly; Kings County, 2nd District; 1874	Succeeded by John R. Kennaday
