= John H. Burtis =

American businessman and politician

John Henry Burtis (September 5, 1832 – January 29, 1903) was an American businessman and politician from New York.

== Life ==
Burtis was born on September 5, 1832, in Hoosick Falls, New York. He moved to Washington County when he was five. He was the son of John Burtis, a sieve manufacturer and justice of the peace, and Eliza Lee.

Burtis attended Cambridge Academy. In 1854, he graduated from Union College, where he was a member of Phi Beta Kappa. He then studied law, then theology, at Princeton Seminary. From 1858 to 1864, he was the associate secretary of missions for the American Sunday School Union. He also spent a few years teaching, serving as principal of Cambridge Academy for two years. He wanted to have a professional career, but a partial paralysis of an eye prevented this.

In 1864, shortly after his marriage, Burtis moved to Brooklyn. He worked in real estate. He was an early advocate of rapid transit and Brooklyn, and was an organizer and president of the Brooklyn Elevated Silent Safety Railroad Company. He quickly became connected with public charities in the city.

Initially a Democrat, he became a Republican in 1861 in response to the American Civil War. In 1874, he was elected to the New York State Assembly, representing the Kings County 5th District. He served in the Assembly in 1875. He was re-elected to the Assembly in 1893, and served in 1894. While in the Assembly, he introduced a bill that allowed Manhattan and Brooklyn voters to vote on the consolidation of Greater New York. In 1897, Brooklyn mayor Frederick W. Wurster appointed him Commissioner of Charities.

In 1864, Burtis married Mary Gardiner Thomson, the daughter of James B. Thomson, a well-known mathematician who wrote Thomson's Arithmetics and Thompson's Mathematical Series. Their children were Mary L., John H. Jr., Grace L., and Charles. He was a member of the Congregational church. He was a Deputy Grand Master in the Freemasons and a Shriner. He was a vice-president of the Brooklyn Union League Club and president of the Aurora Grata Club.

Burtis died at home on January 29, 1903. He was buried in Green-Wood Cemetery.

New York State Assembly
Preceded by Eugene D. Berri	New York State Assembly; Kings County, 5th District; 1875	Succeeded by Albion P. Higgins
Preceded by Hubert G. Taylor	New York State Assembly; Kings County, 5th District; 1894	Succeeded by John H. Read
