= Jacob A. Gross =

American politician

Jacob A. Gross (1842 – October 8, 1887) was an American lawyer and politician from New York.

== Life ==
Born in New York City, he was the son of Martin Gross. He attended private schools in New York City. Then, he studied law at Columbia Law School, graduating LL.B. in 1864, and LL.M. in 1865, and practiced law in New York City.

He was a member of the New York State Senate (6th D.) in 1874 and 1875.

Gross never married. A moderate smoker, he died of cancer of the throat at the age of 45, following an unsuccessful operation.
