= Daniel F. Tiemann =

American politician

Daniel Fawcett Tiemann
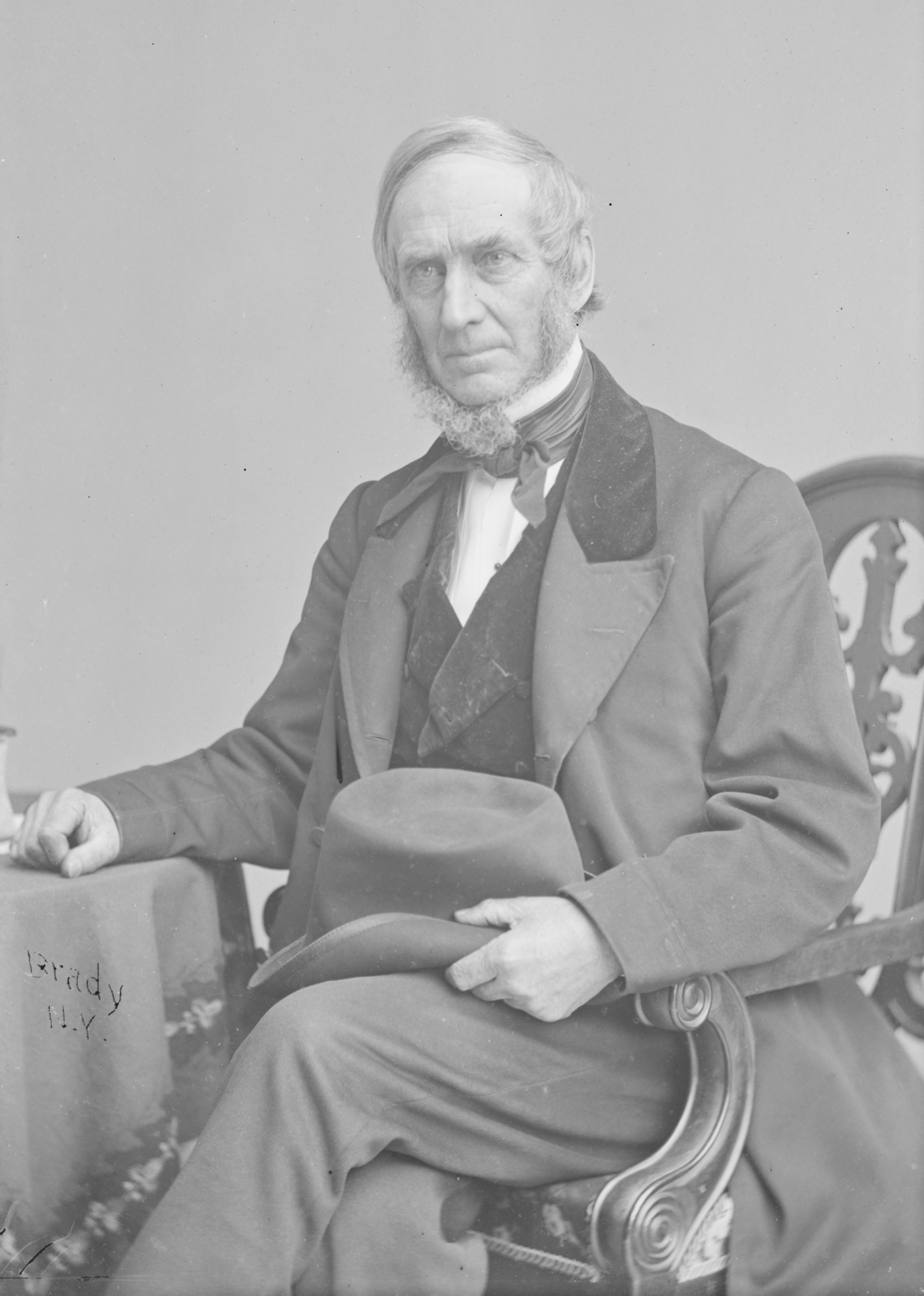

Member of the New York Senate from the 8th district
- In office January 1, 1872 – December 31, 1873
- Preceded by: Henry W. Genet
- Succeeded by: Hugh H. Moore

75th Mayor of New York City
- In office January 1, 1858 – December 31, 1859
- Preceded by: Fernando Wood
- Succeeded by: Fernando Wood

Personal details
- Born: January 9, 1805 New York City, U.S.
- Died: June 29, 1899 (aged 94) New York City, U.S.

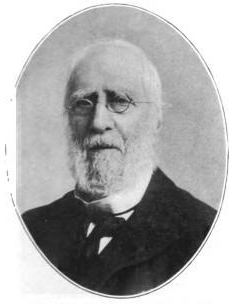

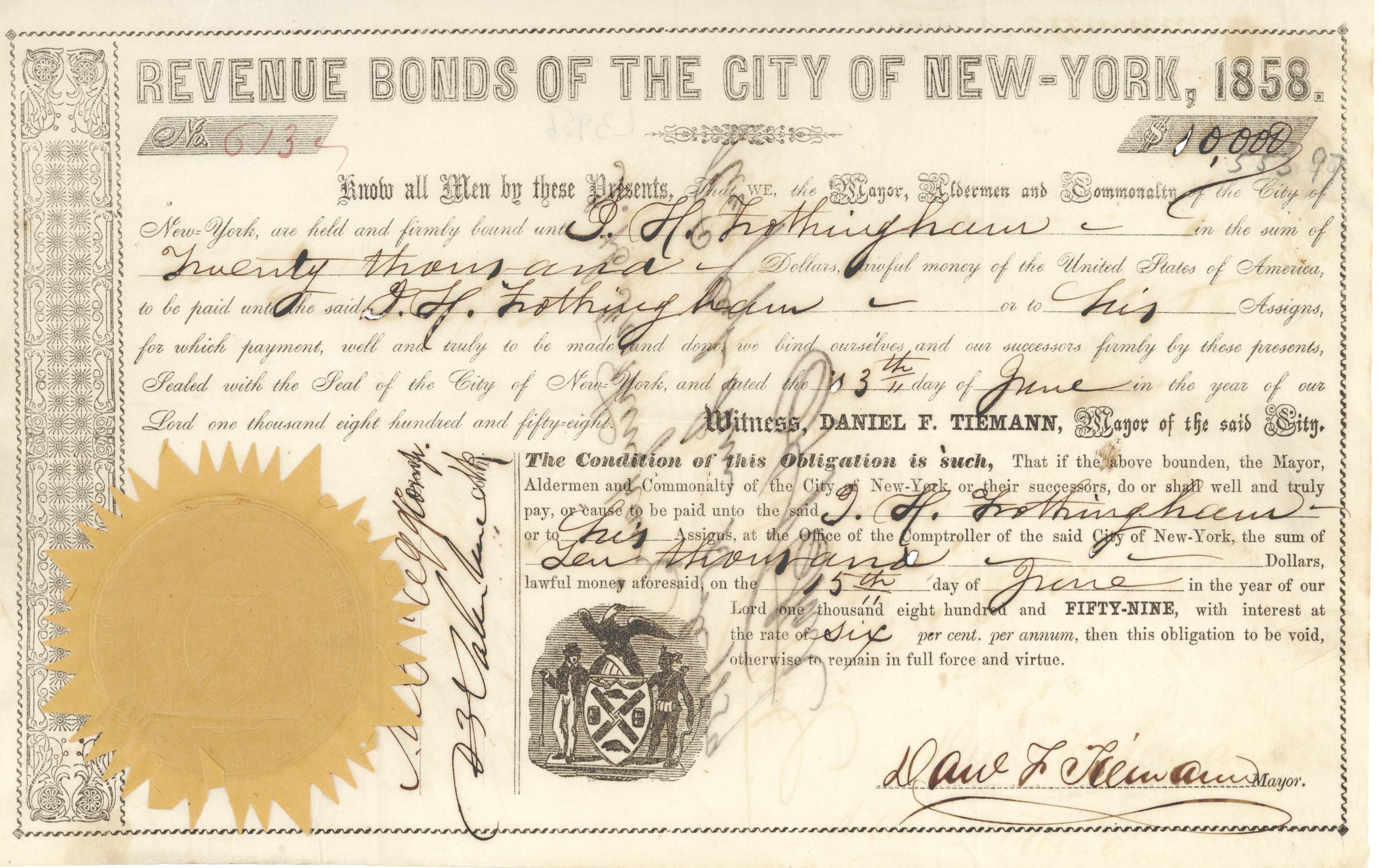
Revenue Bond of the City of New York, issued 3. June 1858, signed by mayor Daniel F. Tiemann

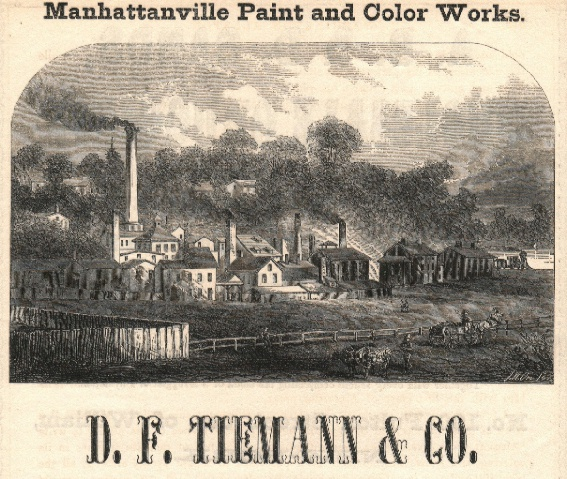

Daniel Fawcett Tiemann (January 9, 1805 – June 29, 1899) was Mayor of New York City from 1858 to 1860. He was a founding trustee of the Cooper Union for the Advancement of Science and Art.

== Life ==
Tiemann was an industrialist, who lived in Manhattanville where he owned D. F. Tiemann & Company Paint & Color Works, which manufactured pigments and paints. This business had been started originally in 1804 by his father, I. Anthony Tiemann, with his brother, Julius William Tiemann, and Nicholas Stippel. His father retired from the business in 1839. The Tiemann laboratory and factory was originally located on 23rd Street and Fourth Avenue in New York City, near Madison Square Park, later relocating uptown to Manhattanville in 1832.

He was educated in a private seminary and at age thirteen began an apprenticeship in the drugstore of H. M. Schiefflin & Co., on Pearl Street, until 1824, when he joined his father's company. He became a partner in the company in 1826.

In December 1857, Democrat Fernando Wood, the mayor of New York, was removed from office by the New York State Legislature, and an election was held to replace him. Fed up with the corruption of Wood's administration, members of the Democratic Party's inner circle, powerful merchants such as August Belmont, John A. Dix, William Havemeyer, and John van Buren left the party and joined with reformers such as Peter Cooper, Republicans and Know-Nothings to create a fusion Independent Party called the "People's Party". They nominated Tiemann as their candidate, while Wood ran on the Democratic ticket. Tiemann won the election with 51.4% of the vote, against Wood's 48.6%. He served for one term.

Tiemann was a member of the New York State Senate (8th District) in 1872 and 1873.

His younger brother, Julius William Tiemann, was one of the founding partners in the D. F. Tiemann company, and father of Hermann Newell Tiemann (1863–1957), who was a commercial photographer in New York City.

D. F. Tiemann was nephew-in-law of Peter Cooper, the American industrialist and inventor. In 1826, he had married Martha Clowes, Cooper's niece, and they had three sons and three daughters.

== Legacy ==
Tiemann Place, near 125th Street and Broadway in the New York City borough of Manhattan, and Tiemann Avenue, which extends from Pelham Parkway North to East 222nd Street in the northeastern part of the borough of the Bronx, are named for him.

== See also ==
- List of people from Harlem

Political offices
Preceded by Fernando Wood	Mayor of New York City; 1858–1860	Succeeded by Fernando Wood
New York State Senate
Preceded by Henry W. Genet	New York State Senate; 8th District; 1872–1873	Succeeded by Hugh H. Moore
