= William C. Hazelton =

American politician (1835–1898)

Member of the New York State Assembly from the Seneca County district
- In office January 1, 1874 – December 31, 1874
- Preceded by: William W. Van Demark
- Succeeded by: William Hogan

Personal details
- Born: September 1, 1835 Ulysses, New York, U.S.
- Died: March 2, 1898 (aged 62)
- Party: Democratic
- Spouse: Sarah Pratt (m. 1876)
- Children: 3
- Parent(s): Elijah Hazelton; Mary Ann Clark
- Profession: Politician, lawyer, judge

William C. Hazelton (September 1, 1835 – March 2, 1898) was an American lawyer, politician, and judge from New York.

== Life ==
Hazelton was born on September 1, 1835, in Ulysses, New York, the son of farmer Elijah Hazelton and Mary Ann Clark.

In 1842, Hazelton moved Covert with his parents. When he was 20, he began studying in the law office of Dana, Beers & Howard in Ithaca. He was admitted to the bar in 1858. He then spent the next four years working as a clerk in the law office of H. A. Dowe. In 1862, he was elected District Attorney of Seneca County. He was re-elected to the office in 1868 and 1880.

Hazelton served a term as justice of the peace for Ovid, where he practiced law. In 1873, he was elected to the New York State Assembly as a Democrat, representing Seneca County. He served in the Assembly in 1874. He was County Judge and Surrogate for six years.

In 1876, Hazelton married Sarah Pratt. Their children were Laura, Emma, and Charles P.

Hazelton died on March 2, 1898.

New York State Assembly
Preceded by William W. Van Demark	New York State Assembly; Seneca County; 1874	Succeeded by William Hogan
