= Hubert G. Taylor =

American real estate broker and banker

Hubert G. Taylor (July 9, 1847 – July 8, 1928) was an American banker, real estate agent, and politician from New York. During his teenage years, he organized the Brooklyn Gray Cadets to fight in the American Civil War. During his adulthood, he worked in banking, the cottonseed oil industry, real estate, and held positions such as county treasurer, treasurer of Brooklyn, and president of the Kings County Savings Bank. He also served in the New York State Assembly in 1893.

== Life ==
Taylor was born in Brooklyn, New York, on July 9, 1847. He attended the Polytechnic Institute. His father, William Taylor, was a trustee of the Brooklyn Bridge in 1870.

In 1862, while still a student in the Polytechnic Institute, Taylor organized the Brooklyn Gray Cadets to fight in the American Civil War. Sometimes called the Polytechnic Cadets, the cadet company was fully uniformed and equipped with 150 muskets. Inspired by the United States Zouave Cadets, they drilled according to the zouave manual. The Cadets later grew into the 47th New York National Guard Regiment.

Congressman Martin Kalbfleisch offered Taylor an appointment as a cadet to West Point. Instead, he decided to leave for California. In January 1863, at the age of fifteen, he sailed from New York on the clipper Snow Squall. After escaping a Confederate privateer off the coast of South America, the clipper was wrecked by rocks while trying to cross the Straits of Magellan. The crew abandoned the ship and made their way to the Falkland Islands. From there, Taylor was able to reach San Francisco via a British ship, with only 75 cents in his pocket. After explaining what happened to Messers Dibble and Hyde, to whom the Snow Squall was consigned, they gave him a package with $100. He then went to Sacramento, where a friend of his got him a job as a bookkeeper.

While in Sacramento, he befriended Edward B. Patridge, and the two of them became inspired to acquire a fortune in China. They boarded the ship Rival that brought them both to Hong Kong. Although they both had letters of recommendation from prominent California businessmen, they were unsuccessful in finding any employment. They returned to the Rival, still in port, and took the ship to Ireland. When the ship landed in Cork, Taylor discovered the American Consul received letters from his parents asking to arrange for him to be sent home. He declined an offer from the captain of the Rival to stay as second officer and agreed to return home, under the condition Patridge come with him.

Three weeks after he returned to Brooklyn, Taylor went to work in the First National Bank of Brooklyn, eventually becoming a teller. He resigned from the bank in 1869 for health reasons, and moved to Vicksburg, Mississippi, where he partook in the cotton seed oil business and partially owned the largest oil mill and steam cotton gunnery in the state, along with a line of freight streamers. After a fire destroyed his property in 1874, he returned to New York. A year later, he moved to West Virginia and collected royalties on the oil and coal produced there. In 1876, he spent eight months in Florida, purchased around 200 acres of land, and returned to New York for good.

In 1878, Taylor was appointed chief clerk under Brooklyn District Attorney Isaac S. Catlin. He worked as chief clerk for six years, after which he became receiving teller for the Manufacturers National Bank. He then entered the real estate business under the firm Taylor & Fox on Broadway.

In 1892, Taylor was elected to the New York State Assembly as a Republican, representing the Kings County 5th District. He served in the Assembly in 1893. He then returned to the Manufacturers National Bank as a receiving teller. In 1894, he was elected county treasurer. While serving as county treasurer, he was also treasurer of Brooklyn, treasurer of the board of education, a member of the board of estimate, and a member of the Thirteenth Regiment Commission. In 1902, he became president of the Kings County Savings Bank. He was also a director of the First National Bank of Brooklyn and treasurer and director of the Kings Highway Association.

Taylor died at home from heart disease on July 8, 1928. He was buried in Green-Wood Cemetery.

New York State Assembly
Preceded by John Kelly (Brooklyn politician)	New York State Assembly; Kings County, 5th District; 1893	Succeeded by John H. Burtis
