= Jeremiah McGuire =

American politician (1823–1889)

Jeremiah McGuire (1823 in Isle of Man – October 25, 1889 in Elmira, Chemung County, New York) was an American lawyer and politician.

He came to the United States in 1830. He worked for some time on a farm in Hector, Schuyler County, New York before he started to study the law with H. B. Jackson in Havana, Schuyler County, New York.

As a Democrat, he was a member of the New York State Assembly in 1873 (Schuyler Co.); and in 1875 (Chemung Co.); and was elected Speaker in 1875. He ran for Congress in 1886, but was beaten by T. S. Flood.

== Sources ==
- Obit in NYT October 26, 1889

New York State Assembly
Preceded by Harmon L. Gregory	New York State Assembly; Schuyler County; 1873	Succeeded by John B. Hoag
Preceded by Edmund Miller	New York State Assembly; Chemung County; 1875	Succeeded by Edmund Miller
Political offices
Preceded by James W. Husted	Speaker of the New York State Assembly; 1875	Succeeded by James W. Husted
