= Frank Abbott (politician) =

American politician (1828–1893)

Personal details
- Born: February 9, 1828 New Haven, Connecticut, U.S.
- Died: April 20, 1893 (aged 65) Bridgeport, Connecticut, U.S.

Frank Abbott (1828–1893) was an American politician from Orange County, New York. He was a member of the New York State Assembly, New York State Senate, and was the Mayor of Port Jervis, New York

== Life ==
Abbott was born on February 9, 1828, in New Haven, Connecticut. He attended the common schools, and became a machinist and railroad engineer. During the American Civil War he was connected with the operations of the Union Army railroad transportation. Later he was Master Mechanic of the Erie Railroad shops at Port Jervis, New York. He was the first Secretary and Treasurer of the Locomotive Engineers' Mutual Life Insurance Association, established in 1868.

He was a member of the New York State Assembly (Orange Co., 2nd D.) in 1872, elected as a Republican; and in 1873, elected as a Liberal Republican with Democratic endorsement.

He was a member of the New York State Senate (8th D.) in 1874. His election was contested by Republican Edward M. Madden, and Abbott's seat was vacated on February 4.

He was Mayor of Port Jervis, New York from 1874 to 1876. He died on April 20, 1893, in Bridgeport, Connecticut.

== Sources ==
- Locomotive Engineers Journal (1869; pg. 32)
- Life Sketches of Executive Officers and Members of the Legislature of the State of New York by William H. McElroy & Alexander McBride (1873, pg. 134f) [e-book]
- The Ice Georges in NYT on March 3, 1875
- The Damage To The Erie Company's Proprerty in NYT on March 18, 1875
- The Spring Elections in NYT on April 7, 1875

New York State Assembly
Preceded by Isaac V. Montanye	New York State Assembly; Orange County, 2nd District; 1872–1873	Succeeded by Charles B. Wood
New York State Senate
Preceded by Edward M. Madden	New York State Senate; 10th District; 1874	Succeeded by Edward M. Madden
