= Thomas Y. Howe Jr. =

American politician (1801–1860)

Member of the U.S. House of Representatives from New York's 25th district
- In office March 4, 1851 – March 3, 1853
- Preceded by: Harmon S. Conger
- Succeeded by: Edwin B. Morgan

Personal details
- Born: Thomas Yardley Howe Jr. 1801 Auburn, New York, U.S.
- Died: July 15, 1860 (aged 58–59) Auburn, New York, U.S.
- Resting place: Fort Hill Cemetery, Auburn, New York, U.S.
- Party: Democratic

Thomas Yardley Howe Jr. (1801 – July 15, 1860) was an American lawyer and politician who served one term as a U.S. Representative from New York from 1851 to 1853.

== Early life and education ==
Born in Auburn, New York, Howe completed preparatory studies, studied law, was admitted to the bar, and practiced in Auburn.

== Business career ==
Howe was also involved in several businesses, including treasurer and a member of the board of directors for the Auburn and Syracuse Railroad, president of the Lake Ontario, Auburn and New York Railroad, editor of the Cayuga New Era newspaper, and trustee of the Auburn Savings Bank.

== Political career ==
A Democrat, Howe served on the board of inspectors for the Auburn State Prison from 1834 to 1838. He was elected Surrogate Judge of Cayuga County and served from March 18, 1836, to April 14, 1840.

=== Congress ===
Howe was elected to represent New York's 25th District in the Thirty-second Congress, and he served from March 4, 1851 to March 3, 1853. He did not run for reelection.

=== Later political career ===
Eschewing a re-election campaign for Congress, he ran instead for Mayor of Auburn. He was elected and served a one-year term, March 1853 to March 1854.

== Death ==
Howe died in Auburn on July 15, 1860, and was buried at Fort Hill Cemetery in Auburn. Howe was one of the donors of the land for the cemetery, had been an incorporator of the Fort Hill Cemetery Association, and was secretary of the association's first board of trustees.

== Name ==
His last name is sometimes spelled "How", which is how it appears on his gravestone.

== See also ==
- List of mayors of Auburn, New York

U.S. House of Representatives
Preceded by Harmon S. Conger	Member of the U.S. House of Representatives from New York's 25th congressional district 1851–1853	Succeeded by Edwin B. Morgan
