= Theron Akin =

American politician

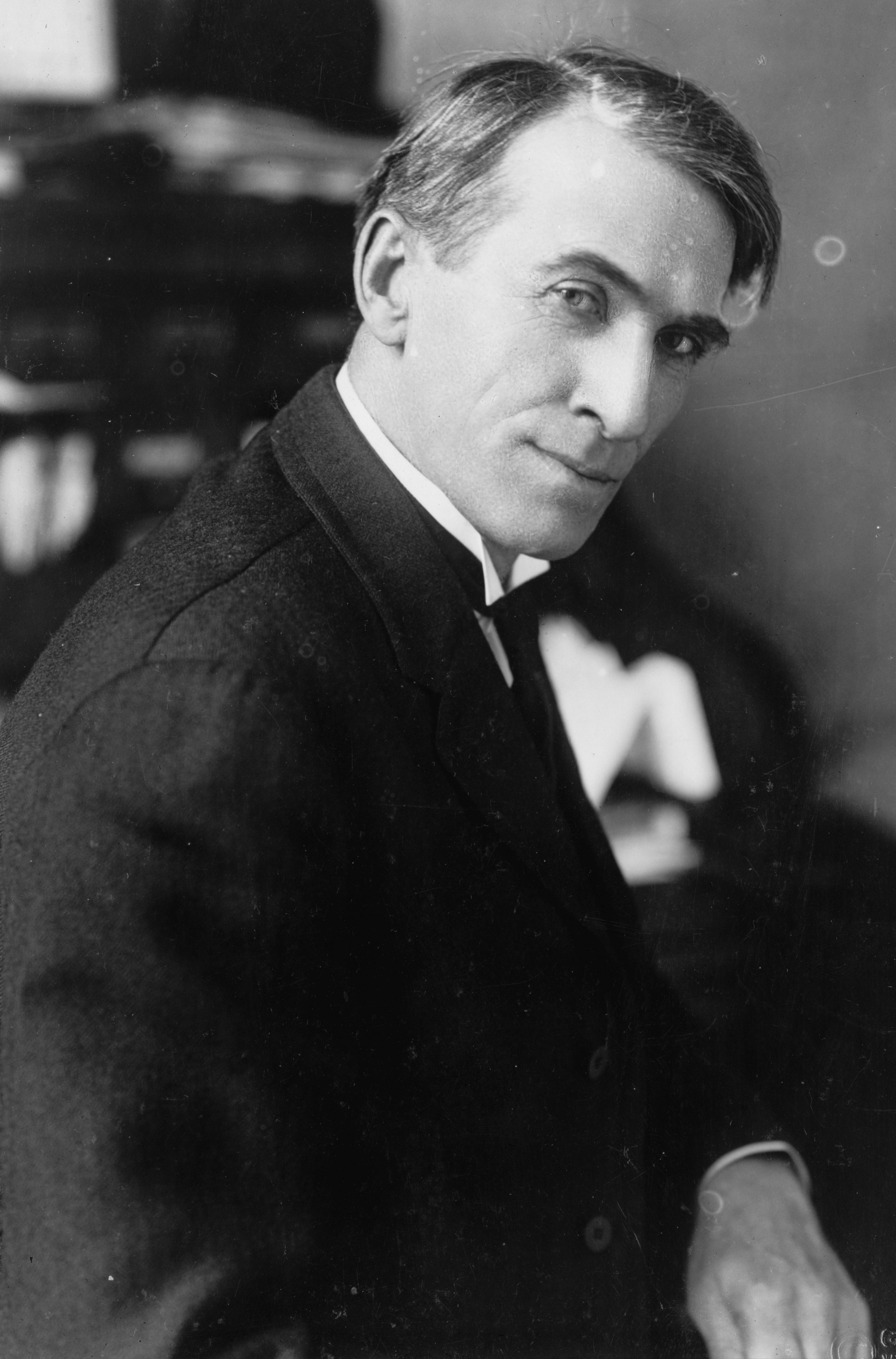
- Akin in 1912

Member of the U.S. House of Representatives from New York's 25th district
- In office March 4, 1911 – March 3, 1913
- Preceded by: Cyrus Durey
- Succeeded by: Benjamin I. Taylor

Personal details
- Born: May 23, 1855 Johnstown, New York, U.S.
- Died: March 26, 1933 (aged 77) Amsterdam, New York, U.S.
- Party: Progressive; Republican
- Spouses: Carrie Bell Akin; Mary Sanford Akin; Jennie Akin; Jane Bornt Akin
- Children: 3
- Education: New York Dental College
- Profession: Farmer, dentist, politician

Theron Akin (May 23, 1855 – March 26, 1933) was an American politician who served one term as a U.S. representative from New York from 1911 to 1913.

== Biography ==
Born in Johnstown, New York, on May 23, 1855, Akin was the son of Ethan and Susan (St. John) Akin, and attended the common schools of Amsterdam, New York, and also was privately tutored at home. At the age of 20, he was a member of Billy Rice's minstrel troupe. He later engaged in agricultural pursuits, and graduated from the New York Dental College and practiced for twelve years in Amsterdam, New York. He married Carrie Bell on September 24, 1874, and they had two children, Harry and Florence. He married Mary Sanford on December 16, 1880, and they had one child, David. In 1904 he married Jennie and in 1920 he married Jane Bornt.

== Career ==
Akin moved to Akin (later Fort Johnson), New York, and engaged in agricultural pursuits in Montgomery County. The village of Akin changed its name because of residents' disapproval of Theron Akin. He served as president of the village of Fort Johnson, New York.

=== Congress ===
Elected as a Progressive Republican to the Sixty-second Congress as a U. S. Representative of the twenty-fifth district of New York, Akin served from March 4, 1911, to March 3, 1913. He was an unsuccessful candidate for renomination on the Progressive ticket in 1912 and resumed agricultural pursuits. He was again an unsuccessful candidate for election to the Sixty-fourth Congress on the Progressive ticket in 1914.

Akin served as Mayor of Amsterdam, New York, from 1920 to 1924. He resumed his former pursuits, and was an unsuccessful candidate for the Republican and Democratic mayoralty nomination in 1927.

== Death ==
Akin died, from a stroke of paralysis, in Amsterdam, New York, on March 26, 1933. He is interred at Pine Grove Cemetery, Tribes Hill, New York.

U.S. House of Representatives
Preceded by Cyrus Durey	Member of the U.S. House of Representatives from New York's 25th congressional district March 4, 1910 – March 3, 1912	Succeeded by Benjamin I. Taylor
