= George O. Rathbun =

American politician

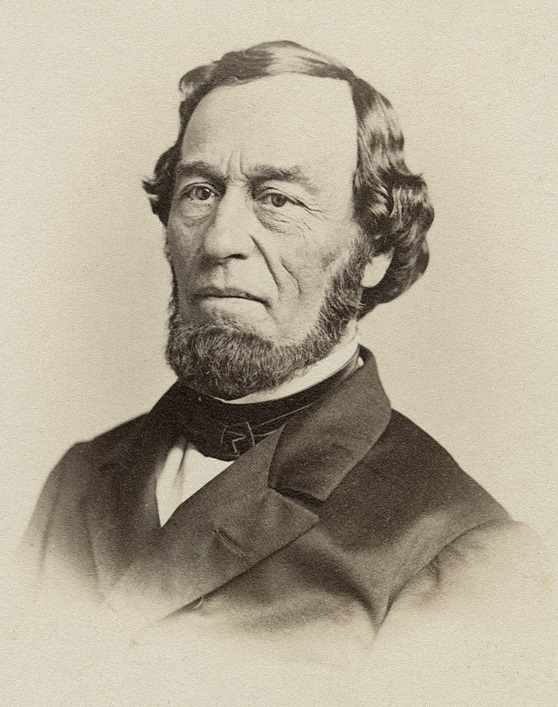

Chair of the House Judiciary Committee
- In office March 4, 1845 – March 3, 1847
- Preceded by: Romulus M. Saunders
- Succeeded by: Joseph R. Ingersoll

Chair of the House Revolutionary Pensions Committee
- In office 1843–1844
- Preceded by: John Taliaferro
- Succeeded by: David L. Seymour

Member of the U.S. House of Representatives from New York's 25th district
- In office March 4, 1843 – March 3, 1847
- Preceded by: John Maynard
- Succeeded by: Harmon S. Conger

Clerk of Supervisors of Cayuga County, New York
- In office 1837–1841

Personal details
- Born: October 16, 1802 Scipio, New York
- Died: January 4, 1870 (aged 67) Auburn, New York
- Resting place: Fort Hill Cemetery in Auburn, New York
- Party: Democratic
- Spouse: Eliza Treat Gould (m. 1823)
- Parent(s): Edward Rathbun; Anna Fuller Rathbun
- Education: Hamilton College
- Profession: Attorney

George Oscar Rathbun (October 16, 1802 – January 4, 1870) was an American lawyer and politician who served two terms as a U.S. representative from New York from 1843 to 1847.

== Biography ==
Born in Scipioville, near Auburn, New York, the son of Edward and Anna Fuller Rathbun. He attended the Auburn schools, studied law, was admitted to the bar and commenced practice in Auburn. He married Eliza Treat Gould on October 16, 1823.

A Democrat, he served as Clerk of the Cayuga County Board of Supervisors and was Auburn's Postmaster from 1837 to 1841.

=== Congress ===
Rathbun was elected to the Twenty-eighth and Twenty-ninth Congresses, serving from March 4, 1843, to March 3, 1847.

During his first term, he was Chairman of the Committee on Revolutionary Pensions, and in his second he was Chairman of the Judiciary Committee.

On April 23, 1844, Rathbun was involved in a physical confrontation on the House floor with former Speaker John White. White, a Whig, was delivering a speech in defense of Senator Henry Clay, the Whig nominee for President in that year's presidential election, and objected to a ruling from the Speaker denying him time to conclude his remarks. When Rathbun told White to be quiet, White confronted him and their disagreement lead to a fistfight between the two with dozens of their colleagues rushing to break it up. During the disturbance, an unknown visitor fired a pistol into the crowd, wounding a police officer. Both Rathbun and White subsequently apologized for their actions.

=== Later career ===
Rathbun opposed slavery and later became involved with the Barnburners. He became a Republican when that party was founded in the 1850s.

He continued to practice law and was a Delegate to the 1867 New York constitutional convention.

== Death and burial ==
Rathbun died in Auburn, New York on January 4, 1870. He was interred in Auburn's Fort Hill Cemetery.

== Sources ==
U.S. House of Representatives
Preceded by John Maynard	Member of the U.S. House of Representatives from New York's 25th congressional district March 4, 1843 – March 3, 1847	Succeeded by Harmon S. Conger
