= John W. Lippitt =

American politician

John W. Lippitt (April 21, 1822 in Adams, Berkshire County, Massachusetts – May 15, 1896 in Solsville, Madison County, New York) was an American politician from New York.

== Life ==
The family removed to a farm near the hamlet of Solsville. He attended the common schools and Stockbridge Academy.

He was Supervisor of the Town of Madison for many terms, beginning in 1861; and Chairman of the Board of Supervisors of Madison County for more than twelve years.

He was a member of the New York State Assembly (Madison Co., 1st D.) in 1864 and 1872; and of the New York State Senate (21st D.) in 1878 and 1879.

He was buried at the Indian Opening Cemetery in Madison.

== Sources ==
- Civil List and Constitutional History of the Colony and State of New York compiled by Edgar Albert Werner (1884; pg. 291, 366 and 373)
- The State Government for 1879 by Charles G. Shanks (Weed, Parsons & Co, Albany NY, 1879; pg. 62)
- John W. Lippitt at Oswego County Government
- Cemetery transcriptions

New York State Assembly
Preceded by William H. Brand	New York State Assembly; Madison County, 1st District; 1864	Succeeded by Alfred A. Brown
Preceded by David L. Fisk	New York State Assembly; Madison County, 1st District; 1872	Succeeded by Edward C. Philpot
New York State Senate
Preceded by Benjamin Doolittle	New York State Senate; 21st District; 1878–1879	Succeeded by Bradley Winslow
