= Charles Kellogg (state senator) =

American politician

Charles Kellogg (December 4, 1839, in Minden, Montgomery County, New York – 1903) was an American politician from New York.

== Life ==
He was the son of Assemblyman Daniel F. Kellogg (1807–1864) and Emily Dunham Kellogg (1814–1882). He attended Yates Polytechnic Institute. He graduated from Albany Law School in 1863, and practiced law in Chittenango. He married Ann Elizabeth Moody (1841–1922), and they had several children.

He was a member of the New York State Senate (21st D.) in 1874 and 1875.

He was buried at the Oakwood Cemetery in Chittenango.

== Sources ==
- Life Sketches of Government Officers and Members of the Legislature of the State of New York in 1875 by W. H. McElroy and Alexander McBride (pg. 67f) [e-book]
- Oakwood Cemetery transcriptions

New York State Senate
Preceded by William Foster	New York State Senate; 21st District; 1874–1875	Succeeded by Benjamin Doolittle
