= James W. Husted (representative) =

American politician

James William Husted
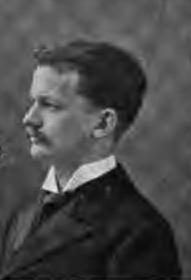
- Husted in 1897

Member of the U.S. House of Representatives from New York's 25th district
- In office March 4, 1915 – March 3, 1923
- Preceded by: Benjamin I. Taylor
- Succeeded by: J. Mayhew Wainwright

Member of the New York State Assembly for the 3rd Westchester District
- In office 1895–1897
- Preceded by: Edgar L. Ryder
- Succeeded by: John Gibney

Personal details
- Born: March 16, 1870 Peekskill, New York, U.S.
- Died: January 2, 1925 (aged 54) New York City, New York, U.S.
- Party: Republican
- Parent: James W. Husted (father)
- Education: New York Law School

James William Husted (March 16, 1870 – January 2, 1925) was a politician elected to four succeeding terms as a U.S. representative (1915–1923) from New York. He was an attorney who served in local offices, as well as president of the Peekskill Bank.

== Early life and education ==
Husted was born into a political family in Peekskill, New York, the son of James W. Husted and his wife. His father was then a member of the New York State Assembly, and several times in later years was elected Speaker of the Assembly. The junior Husted attended private schools, the Peekskill Military Academy, and Cutler's School, New York City. He graduated from Phillips Academy, Andover, Massachusetts. He graduated in 1888 from Yale University in 1892, where he was a member of Skull and Bones, and in 1894 from the New York Law School.

== Marriage and family ==
Husted first married Louise Wetmore Spaulding. They had six children: James William, Jr., John G.W., Pricilla, David, Ellery, and Robert. After Louise's death, he married Bertha Frances Harricks.

== Career ==
Husted was admitted to the bar in 1894, and commenced practice in Peekskill. He soon entered politics, and was a member of the New York State Assembly (Westchester Co., 3rd D.) in 1895, 1896 and 1897. In 1897, he moved to the growing city of White Plains and continued the practice of law.

In 1902, Husted returned to Peekskill and practiced law. He was elected president of the village of Peekskill in 1903 and 1904. He served as member and treasurer of the board of park commissioners from 1909 to 1920.

In 1912, he was an unsuccessful candidate for election to the Sixty-third Congress. Husted was elected as a Republican to the Sixty-fourth and to the three succeeding Congresses (March 4, 1915 – March 3, 1923).

Declining to run for office in 1922, Husted returned to the practice of law in Peekskill. He also engaged in banking and served as president of the Peekskill Bank.

He died of heart disease in New York City on January 2, 1925.

New York State Assembly
Preceded by Edgar L. Ryder	New York State Assembly; Westchester County, 3rd District; 1895–1897	Succeeded by John Gibney
U.S. House of Representatives
Preceded by Benjamin I. Taylor	Member of the U.S. House of Representatives from New York's 25th congressional district 1915–1923	Succeeded by J. Mayhew Wainwright
