= Daniel Bradley (politician) =

Irish-American politician

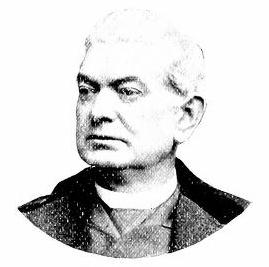
Daniel Bradley (1894)

Daniel Bradley (March 17, 1833 – February 23, 1908) was an American politician from New York.

== Biography ==
Bradley was born in Derry, Ireland where he attended a parochial school, later immigrating to the United States in 1850. He settled in Brooklyn, and became a tobacconist, and later a dealer in stoves and tinware. During the American Civil War, he was a captain in the 14th Regiment of the New York National Guard. After the war, he also engaged in the real estate and insurance business.

Bradley was elected to the New York State Assembly on a combined Democratic and Independent ticket in 1874. Bradley was a ‘Soft Shell,’ against slavery and in the more liberal wing of the Democratic Party. His election opened a rift in the King's County Democratic Party in Brooklyn, and He was placed on one of two rival Democratic committees, with ‘Hard Shell’ John J. Vanderbilt on the other. At the time, the Brooklyn Eagle commented that “The contrast between the two men could hardly have been more manifest.”

Bradley was twice re-elected and became known as a fighter against graft and corruption. He earned the nickname “Honest Dan” for his personal incorruptibility.

In 1893, he was elected to the New York State Senate as a “Reform” Democrat, in another contentious election. His opponent, William Van Slooten, was a member of New York's powerful Hugh McLaughlin machine, but was otherwise relatively unknown. Bradley used “Who is Van Slooten?” as his campaign slogan. He was sworn into the Senate in 1894 as that body's youngest man, although he was then about sixty.

One of Bradley's first bills in the Senate was a proposal to establish fixed salaries for Senators. Prior to this, State Senators had taken graft from contractors and other special interest groups. Bradley's bill was designed to stop this.

In 1894, Daniel Bradley was active in the investigations of the Lexow Committee, which heard some 57,666 pages of testimony and served over 3,000 subpoenas.

Bradley was a devout Catholic as a member of the Church of the Assumption in Brooklyn. He was active in the Catholic Benevolent Legion, helping to establish new branches, and was a member of the Board of Managers of the Catholic Orphan Society. He and his wife, Julia Duane, had three daughters and two sons. Catherine married Thomas E. Murray, an Albany inventor and businessman. They raised eight children in Brooklyn.

He died at the home of his son-in-law, Thomas E. Murray Jr., at 783 St. Mark's Avenue in Brooklyn, after "suffering with grip for four weeks".

== Membership ==
- Member of the New York State Assembly (Kings Co., 1st District) in 1875, 1876 and 1877, elected for the sessions of 1875 and 1877 as an Independent Democrat, and for 1876 as a Democrat.
- Member of the New York State Senate (5th District) in 1894 and 1895
- Member of the Lexow Committee of the New York State Senate, which was instrumental in the fall of Tammany Hall

== Sources ==
- The New York Red Book compiled by Edgar L. Murlin (published by James B. Lyon, Albany NY, 1897; pg. 404 and 496f)
- Life Sketches of Government Officers and Members of the Legislature of the State of New York in 1875 by W. H. McElroy and Alexander McBride (pg. 143)
- Sketches of the members of the Legislature in The Evening Journal Almanac (1895; pg. 48)
- EX-SENATOR BRADLEY DIES in NYT on February 24, 1908
- Bark Charlotte Harrison Passenger List listing Daniel Bradley as Passenger #197, arriving 15 July 1850

New York State Assembly
Preceded by James F. Donahue	New York State Assembly; Kings County, 1st District; 1875–1877	Succeeded by John M. Clancy
New York State Senate
Preceded by William L. Brown	New York State Senate; 5th District; 1894–1895	Succeeded by Michael J. Coffey
