= New York's 25th congressional district =

U.S. House district for New York

Coordinates: 43°19′49″N 77°43′52″W

- Interactive map of district boundaries since January 3, 2025
- Representative: Joe Morelle; D–Irondequoit
- Distribution: 95.52% urban; 4.48% rural
- Population (2025): 768,067
- Median household income: $77,513
- Ethnicity: 67.1% White; 14.5% Black; 9.5% Hispanic; 4.2% Asian; 4.1% Two or more races; 0.6% other
- Cook PVI: D+10

New York's 25th congressional district is a congressional district for the United States House of Representatives. It is currently represented by Democrat Joseph Morelle. Since 2023, the district has been located within Monroe County and part of Ontario County, centered on the city of Rochester.

Former representative Louise Slaughter, who had represented Rochester in Congress since 1987, died while in office in March 2018, leaving the seat vacant until that year’s general election. State Assemblymember Joseph Morelle (Democrat) faced James Maxwell (Republican, Conservative, Reform), in the general election, which Morelle won handily. Morelle went on to win reelection in 2020, 2022, and 2024.

== Recent election results from statewide races ==
Year	Office	Results
2008	President	Obama 58% - 41%
2012	President	Obama 59% - 41%
2016	President	Clinton 54% - 40%
2016	Senate	Schumer 67% - 31%
2018	Senate	Gillibrand 62% - 38%
2018	Governor	Cuomo 51% - 43%
2018	Attorney General	James 55% - 42%
2020	President	Biden 59% - 38%
2022	Senate	Schumer 57% - 43%
2022	Governor	Hochul 54% - 46%
2022	Attorney General	James 54% - 46%
2022	Comptroller	DiNapoli 57% - 43%
2024	President	Harris 59% - 40%
2024	Senate	Gillibrand 60% - 40%

== History ==
Historically, most of this district was located in Upstate New York. In the 1960s, the 25th district was a Westchester/Rockland seat, covering areas now in the 17th and 18th districts. In the 1970s it was the lower Hudson Valley district and congruent to the present 19th district. Onondaga County was split between the 32nd district (which included rural counties east of Syracuse now in the 23rd and 24th districts) and the 33rd district (which included the Finger Lakes counties in the 24th and 29th districts).

In the 1980s, the district was centered in the Utica area (now the 24th district), and the Syracuse area was entirely in the 27th district. From 2003 to 2013, it stretched from Syracuse to the northeastern suburbs of Rochester. The district comprised Onondaga and Wayne counties, the northernmost portion of Cayuga County, and the towns of Irondequoit, Penfield, and Webster in Monroe County. The district included 100 miles of Lake Ontario shoreline, the easternmost Finger Lakes, and significant portions of the Erie Canal.

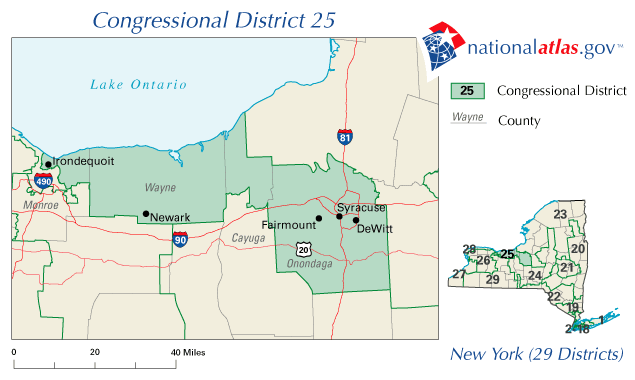
2003–2013

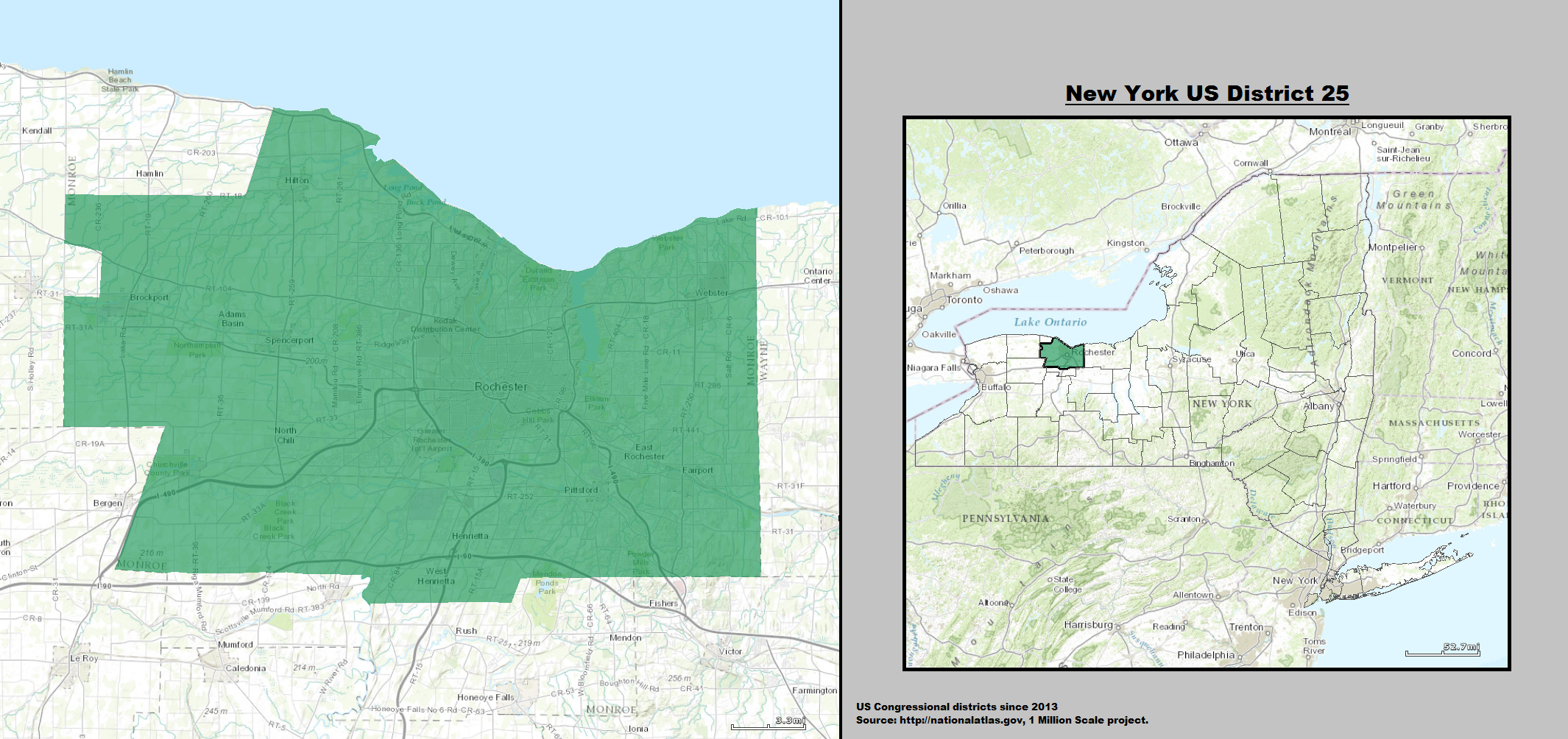
2013–2023

== Counties, towns, and cities ==
For the 119th and successive Congresses (based on the districts drawn following the New York Court of Appeals' December 2023 decision in Hoffman v New York State Ind. Redistricting. Commn.), the district contains all or portions of the following counties, towns, and cities.

Monroe County (21)

All 21 towns and cities

Ontario County (2)

East Bloomfield (part; also 24th; includes part of Bloomfield), Victor

== List of members representing the district ==
Member	Party	Years	Cong ress	Electoral history	Location
District established March 4, 1823
Samuel Lawrence (Johnsons Settlement)	Democratic-Republican	March 4, 1823 – March 3, 1825	18th	Elected in 1822. [data missing]	1823–1833; Tioga and Tompkins counties
Charles Humphrey (Ithaca)	Anti-Jacksonian	March 4, 1825 – March 3, 1827	19th	Elected in 1824. [data missing]	1823–1833; Tioga and Tompkins counties
David Woodcock (Ithaca)	Anti-Jacksonian	March 4, 1827 – March 3, 1829	20th	Elected in 1826. [data missing]	1823–1833; Tioga and Tompkins counties
Thomas Maxwell (Elmira)	Jacksonian	March 4, 1829 – March 3, 1831	21st	Elected in 1828. [data missing]	1823–1833; Tioga and Tompkins counties
Gamaliel H. Barstow (Nichols)	Anti-Masonic	March 4, 1831 – March 3, 1833	22nd	Elected in 1830. [data missing]	1823–1833; Tioga and Tompkins counties
Samuel Clark (Waterloo)	Jacksonian	March 4, 1833 – March 3, 1835	23rd	Elected in 1832 [data missing]	1833–1843 [data missing]
Graham H. Chapin (Lyons)	Jacksonian	March 4, 1835 – March 3, 1837	24th	Elected in 1834. [data missing]	1833–1843 [data missing]
Samuel Birdsall (Waterloo)	Democratic	March 4, 1837 – March 3, 1839	25th	Elected in 1836. [data missing]	1833–1843 [data missing]
Theron R. Strong (Palmyra)	Democratic	March 4, 1839 – March 3, 1841	26th	Elected in 1838. [data missing]	1833–1843 [data missing]
John Maynard (Seneca Falls)	Whig	March 4, 1841 – March 3, 1843	27th	Elected in 1840. [data missing]	1833–1843 [data missing]
George O. Rathbun (Auburn)	Democratic	March 4, 1843 – March 3, 1847	28th 29th	Elected in 1842. Re-elected in 1844. [data missing]	1843–1853 [data missing]
Harmon S. Conger (Cortland)	Whig	March 4, 1847 – March 3, 1851	30th 31st	Elected in 1846. Re-elected in 1848. [data missing]	1843–1853 [data missing]
Thomas Y. Howe Jr. (Auburn)	Democratic	March 4, 1851 – March 3, 1853	32nd	Elected in 1850. [data missing]	1843–1853 [data missing]
Edwin B. Morgan (Aurora)	Whig	March 4, 1853 – March 3, 1855	33rd 34th 35th	Elected in 1852. [data missing]	1853–1863 [data missing]
Edwin B. Morgan (Aurora)	Opposition	March 4, 1855 – March 3, 1857	33rd 34th 35th	Re-elected in 1854. [data missing]	1853–1863 [data missing]
Edwin B. Morgan (Aurora)	Republican	March 4, 1857 – March 3, 1859	33rd 34th 35th	Re-elected in 1856. [data missing]	1853–1863 [data missing]
Martin Butterfield (Palmyra)	Republican	March 4, 1859 – March 3, 1861	36th	Elected in 1858. [data missing]	1853–1863 [data missing]
Theodore M. Pomeroy (Auburn)	Republican	March 4, 1861 – March 3, 1863	37th	Elected in 1860. Redistricted to the 24th district.	1853–1863 [data missing]
Daniel Morris (Penn Yan)	Republican	March 4, 1863 – March 3, 1867	38th 39th	Elected in 1862. Re-elected in 1864. [data missing]	1863–1873 [data missing]
William H. Kelsey (Geneseo)	Republican	March 4, 1867 – March 3, 1871	40th 41st	Elected in 1866. Re-elected in 1868. [data missing]	1863–1873 [data missing]
William H. Lamport (Canandaigua)	Republican	March 4, 1871 – March 3, 1873	42nd	Elected in 1870. Redistricted to the 26th district.	1863–1873 [data missing]
Clinton D. MacDougall (Auburn)	Republican	March 4, 1873 – March 3, 1875	43rd	Elected in 1872. Redistricted to the 26th district.	1873–1883 [data missing]
Elias W. Leavenworth (Syracuse)	Republican	March 4, 1875 – March 3, 1877	44th	Elected in 1874. [data missing]	1873–1883 [data missing]
Frank Hiscock (Syracuse)	Republican	March 4, 1877 – March 3, 1887	45th 46th 47th 48th 49th	Elected in 1876. Re-elected in 1878. Re-elected in 1880. Re-elected in 1882. Re-elected in 1884. Re-elected in 1886. Resigned when elected U.S. senator.	1873–1883 [data missing]
Frank Hiscock (Syracuse)	Republican	March 4, 1877 – March 3, 1887	45th 46th 47th 48th 49th	Elected in 1876. Re-elected in 1878. Re-elected in 1880. Re-elected in 1882. Re-elected in 1884. Re-elected in 1886. Resigned when elected U.S. senator.	1883–1893 [data missing]
Vacant		March 3, 1887 – November 8, 1887	50th		1883–1893 [data missing]
James J. Belden (Syracuse)	Republican	November 8, 1887 – March 3, 1893	50th 51st 52nd	Elected to finish Hiscock's term. Re-elected in 1888. Re-elected in 1890. Redistricted to the 27th district.	1883–1893 [data missing]
James S. Sherman (Utica)	Republican	March 4, 1893 – March 3, 1903	53rd 54th 55th 56th 57th	Elected in 1892. Re-elected in 1894. Re-elected in 1896. Re-elected in 1898. Re-elected in 1900. Redistricted to the 27th district.	1893–1903 [data missing]
Lucius N. Littauer (Gloversville)	Republican	March 4, 1903 – March 3, 1907	58th 59th	Redistricted from the 22nd district and re-elected in 1902. Re-elected in 1904. [data missing]	1903–1913 [data missing]
Cyrus Durey (Johnstown)	Republican	March 4, 1907 – March 3, 1911	60th 61st	Elected in 1906. Re-elected in 1908. [data missing]	1903–1913 [data missing]
Theron Akin (Akin)	Progressive Republican	March 4, 1911 – March 3, 1913	62nd	Elected in 1910. [data missing]	1903–1913 [data missing]
Benjamin I. Taylor (Harrison)	Democratic	March 4, 1913 – March 3, 1915	63rd	Elected in 1912. [data missing]	1913–1923 [data missing]
James W. Husted (Peekskill)	Republican	March 4, 1915 – March 3, 1923	64th 65th 66th 67th	Elected in 1914. Re-elected in 1916. Re-elected in 1918. Re-elected in 1920. [data missing]	1913–1923 [data missing]
J. Mayhew Wainwright (Rye)	Republican	March 4, 1923 – March 3, 1931	68th 69th 70th 71st	Elected in 1922. Re-elected in 1924. Re-elected in 1926. Re-elected in 1928. [data missing]	1923–1933 [data missing]
Charles D. Millard (Tarrytown)	Republican	March 4, 1931 – September 29, 1937	72nd 73rd 74th 75th	Elected in 1930. Re-elected in 1932. Re-elected in 1934. Re-elected in 1936. Resigned when elected surrogate of Westchester County	1923–1933 [data missing]
Charles D. Millard (Tarrytown)	Republican	March 4, 1931 – September 29, 1937	72nd 73rd 74th 75th	Elected in 1930. Re-elected in 1932. Re-elected in 1934. Re-elected in 1936. Resigned when elected surrogate of Westchester County	1933–1943 [data missing]
Vacant		September 29, 1937 – November 2, 1937	75th		1933–1943 [data missing]
Ralph A. Gamble (Larchmont)	Republican	November 2, 1937 – January 3, 1945	75th 76th 77th 78th	Elected to finish Millard's term Re-elected in 1938. Re-elected in 1940. Re-elected in 1942. Redistricted to the 28th district.	1933–1943 [data missing]
Ralph A. Gamble (Larchmont)	Republican	November 2, 1937 – January 3, 1945	75th 76th 77th 78th	Elected to finish Millard's term Re-elected in 1938. Re-elected in 1940. Re-elected in 1942. Redistricted to the 28th district.	1943–1953 [data missing]
Charles A. Buckley (New York)	Democratic	January 3, 1945 – January 3, 1953	79th 80th 81st 82nd	Redistricted from the 23rd district and re-elected in 1944. Re-elected in 1946. Re-elected in 1948. Re-elected in 1950. Redistricted to the 24th district.	1943–1953 [data missing]
Paul A. Fino (New York)	Republican	January 3, 1953 – January 3, 1963	83rd 84th 85th 86th 87th	Elected in 1952. Re-elected in 1954. Re-elected in 1956. Re-elected in 1958. Re-elected in 1960. Redistricted to the 24th district.	1953–1963 [data missing]
Robert R. Barry (Yonkers)	Republican	January 3, 1963 – January 3, 1965	88th	Redistricted from the 27th district and re-elected in 1962. [data missing]	1963–1973 [data missing]
Richard Ottinger (Pleasantville)	Democratic	January 3, 1965 – January 3, 1971	89th 90th 91st	Elected in 1964. Re-elected in 1966. Re-elected in 1968. Retired to run for U.S. Senator.	1963–1973 [data missing]
Peter A. Peyser (Irvington)	Republican	January 3, 1971 – January 3, 1973	92nd	Elected in 1970. Redistricted to the 23rd district.	1963–1973 [data missing]
Hamilton Fish IV (Millbrook)	Republican	January 3, 1973 – January 3, 1983	93rd 94th 95th 96th 97th	Redistricted from the 28th district and re-elected in 1972. Re-elected in 1974. Re-elected in 1976. Re-elected in 1978. Re-elected in 1980. Redistricted to the 21st district.	1973–1983 [data missing]
Sherwood Boehlert (New Hartford)	Republican	January 3, 1983 – January 3, 1993	98th 99th 100th 101st 102nd	Elected in 1982. Re-elected in 1984. Re-elected in 1986. Re-elected in 1988. Re-elected in 1990. Redistricted to the 23rd district.	1983–1993 [data missing]
James T. Walsh (Syracuse)	Republican	January 3, 1993 – January 3, 2009	103rd 104th 105th 106th 107th 108th 109th 110th	Redistricted from the 27th district and re-elected in 1992. Re-elected in 1994. Re-elected in 1996. Re-elected in 1998. Re-elected in 2000. Re-elected in 2002. Re-elected in 2004. Re-elected in 2006. Retired.	1993–2003 [data missing]
James T. Walsh (Syracuse)	Republican	January 3, 1993 – January 3, 2009	103rd 104th 105th 106th 107th 108th 109th 110th	Redistricted from the 27th district and re-elected in 1992. Re-elected in 1994. Re-elected in 1996. Re-elected in 1998. Re-elected in 2000. Re-elected in 2002. Re-elected in 2004. Re-elected in 2006. Retired.	2003–2013
Dan Maffei (DeWitt)	Democratic	January 3, 2009 – January 3, 2011	111th	Elected in 2008. Lost re-election.	2003–2013
Ann Marie Buerkle (Syracuse)	Republican	January 3, 2011 – January 3, 2013	112th	Elected in 2010. Redistricted to the 24th district and lost re-election there.	2003–2013
Louise Slaughter (Fairport)	Democratic	January 3, 2013 – March 16, 2018	113th 114th 115th	Redistricted from the 28th district and re-elected in 2012. Re-elected in 2014. Re-elected in 2016. Died.	2013–2023
Vacant		March 16, 2018 – November 13, 2018	115th		2013–2023
Joe Morelle (Irondequoit)	Democratic	November 13, 2018 – present	115th 116th 117th 118th 119th	Elected to finish Slaughter's term. Re-elected in 2018. Re-elected in 2020. Re-elected in 2022. Re-elected in 2024. Re-elected in 2026.	2013–2023
Joe Morelle (Irondequoit)	Democratic	November 13, 2018 – present	115th 116th 117th 118th 119th	Elected to finish Slaughter's term. Re-elected in 2018. Re-elected in 2020. Re-elected in 2022. Re-elected in 2024. Re-elected in 2026.	2023–2025
Joe Morelle (Irondequoit)	Democratic	November 13, 2018 – present	115th 116th 117th 118th 119th	Elected to finish Slaughter's term. Re-elected in 2018. Re-elected in 2020. Re-elected in 2022. Re-elected in 2024. Re-elected in 2026.	2025–present

== Election results ==
In New York State electoral politics, the state allows Electoral fusion, with numerous minor parties at various points on the political spectrum that typically endorse either the Republican or Democratic candidate for an office. Hence the state electoral results contain both the party votes, and the final candidate votes (Listed as "Recap").

1996 election
Party	Candidate	Votes	%	±%
Republican	James T. Walsh (incumbent)	126,691	55.1	
Democratic	Marty Mack	103,199	44.9	
Majority		23,492	10.2	
Turnout		229,890	100	

1998 election
Party	Candidate	Votes	%	±%
Republican	James T. Walsh (incumbent)	121,204	69.4	+14.3
Democratic	Yvonne Rothenberg	53,461	30.6	−14.3
Majority		67,743	38.8	+28.6
Turnout		174,665	100	−24.0

2000 election
Party	Candidate	Votes	%	±%
Republican	James T. Walsh (incumbent)	151,880	69.0	−0.4
Democratic	Francis J. Gavin	64,533	29.3	−1.3
Green	Howie Hawkins	3,830	1.7	+1.7
Majority		87,347	39.7	+0.9
Turnout		220,243	100	+26.1

2002 election
Party	Candidate	Votes	%	±%
Republican	James T. Walsh (incumbent)	144,610	72.3	+3.3
Democratic	Stephanie Aldersley	53,290	26.6	−2.7
Working Families	Francis J. Gavin	2,131	1.1	+1.1
Majority		91,320	45.7	+6.0
Turnout		200,031	100	−9.2

2004 election
Party	Candidate	Votes	%	±%
Republican	James T. Walsh (incumbent)	189,063	90.4	+18.1
Peace and Justice	Howie Hawkins	20,106	9.6	+9.6
Majority		168,957	80.8	+35.1
Turnout		209,169	100	+4.6

2006 election
Party	Candidate	Votes	%	±%
Republican	James T. Walsh (incumbent)	110,525	50.8	−39.6
Democratic	Dan Maffei	107,108	49.2	+49.2
Majority		3,417	1.6	−79.2
Turnout		217,633	100	+4.0

2008 election
Party	Candidate	Votes	%	±%
Democratic	Dan Maffei	157,375	54.8	+5.6
Republican	Dale Sweetland	120,217	41.9	−8.9
Green	Howie Hawkins	9,483	3.3	+3.3
Majority		37,158	12.9	+11.3
Turnout		287,075	100	+31.9

2010 election
Party	Candidate	Votes	%	±%
Republican	Ann Marie Buerkle	104,374	50.1	+8.2
Democratic	Dan Maffei (incumbent)	103,807	49.9	−4.9
Turnout		208,181	100	−27.5

2012 election
Party	Candidate	Votes	%	±%
Democratic	Louise Slaughter	168,761		
Working Families	Louise Slaughter	11,049		
Total	Louise Slaughter (incumbent)	179,810	57.4	
Republican	Maggie Brooks	109,292		
Conservative	Maggie Brooks	18,543		
Independence	Maggie Brooks	5,554		
Total	Maggie Brooks	133,389	42.6	
None	Blank/Void/Scattered	9,561	0	
Total votes		313,199	100.00	
Democratic hold				

2014 election
Party	Candidate	Votes	%	±%
Democratic	Louise M. Slaughter	87,264	44.41	
Working Families	Louise M. Slaughter	9,539	4.85	
Total	Louise M. Slaughter (Incumbent)	96,803	49.26	
Republican	Mark W. Assini	75,990	38.67	
Conservative	Mark W. Assini	19,942	10.15	
Total	Mark W. Assini	95,932	48.82	
None	Blank/Void/Write-In	3,781	1.92	
Total votes		196,516	100	

2016 election
Party	Candidate	Votes	%	±%
Democratic	Louise Slaughter	168,660	50.14%	
Working Families	Louise Slaughter	10,195	3.03%	
Women's Equality	Louise Slaughter	4,095	1.22%	
Total	Louise Slaughter (incumbent)	182,950	54.39%	
Republican	Mark Assini	113,840	33.84%	
Conservative	Mark Assini	20,883	6.21%	
Independence	Mark Assini	6,856	2.04%	
Reform	Mark Assini	1,071	0.32%	
Total	Mark Assini	142,650	42.41%	
None	Blank/Void/Scattering	10,786	3.21%	
Total votes		336,386	100.00%	
Democratic hold				

New York's 25th congressional district, 2018
Party	Candidate	Votes	%
Democratic	Joseph Morelle	147,979	54.8
Working Families	Joseph Morelle	4,575	1.7
Independence	Joseph Morelle	4,585	1.7
Women's Equality	Joseph Morelle	2,105	0.8
Total	Joseph Morelle	149,993	59.0
Republican	Jim Maxwell	91,342	33.8
Conservative	Jim Maxwell	17,781	6.6
Reform	Jim Maxwell	1,613	0.6
Total	Jim Maxwell	105,925	41.0
Total votes		269,980	100.0
Democratic hold			

New York's 25th congressional district, 2020
Party	Candidate	Votes	%
Democratic	Joseph Morelle	187,503	53.9
Working Families	Joseph Morelle	14,584	4.2
Independence	Joseph Morelle	4,309	1.2
Total	Joseph Morelle (incumbent)	206,396	59.3
Republican	George Mitris	115,940	33.4
Conservative	George Mitris	20,258	5.8
Total	George Mitris	136,198	39.2
Libertarian	Kevin Wilson	5,325	1.5
Total votes		347,919	100.0
Democratic hold			

2024 New York's 25th congressional district election
Party	Candidate	Votes	%
Democratic	Joseph Morelle	200,507	55.6
Working Families	Joseph Morelle	18,668	5.2
Total	Joseph Morelle (incumbent)	219,175	60.8
Republican	Gregg Sadwick	141,195	39.2
Total votes		360,370	100.0
Democratic hold			

== See also ==
- List of United States congressional districts
- New York's congressional delegations
- New York's congressional districts
