= Lucius Littauer =

American politician, businessman, and football coach

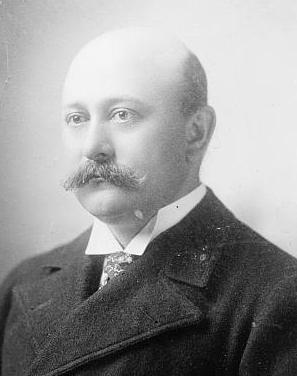
- Littauer in 1914

Member of the U.S. House of Representatives from New York
- In office March 4, 1897 – March 3, 1903
- Preceded by: Newton Martin Curtis
- Succeeded by: Cyrus Durey
- Constituency: 22nd district (1897–1903); 25th district (1903–1907)

Personal details
- Born: January 20, 1859 Gloversville, New York, U.S.
- Died: March 2, 1944 (aged 85) New Rochelle, New York, U.S.
- Party: Republican
- Education: Harvard University

Lucius Nathan Littauer (January 20, 1859 – March 2, 1944) was an American politician, businessman, and college football coach. He served in the United States House of Representatives from New York for five terms between 1897 and 1907. Littauer graduated from Harvard University in 1878 and was the school's first head football coach, guiding the Crimson to a record of 6–1–1 in 1881.

In 1936, Littauer's donation of $2 million helped found Harvard's Graduate School of Public Administration, which was later renamed the Harvard Kennedy School in honor of former U.S. President John F. Kennedy and is routinely ranked as the world's top graduate school for public policy, social policy, international affairs, and government.

== Biography ==
Littauer was born January 20, 1859, to a Lithuanian-Jewish family ("Litauer" being German for "Lithuanian") in Gloversville, New York. He moved with his parents to New York City in 1865.

=== Education ===
After attending the Charlier Institute for boys and young gentlemen in New York City, Littauer attended and graduated from Harvard University in 1878, and later coached the Harvard Crimson football team in 1881.

== Career ==
Returning to Gloversville, Littauer entered his father's glove making business and went on to become an officer and director of many commercial and financial institutions.

Littauer was elected as a Republican to the Fifty-fifth and to the four succeeding Congresses (March 4, 1897 – March 3, 1907). He chose not to stand for reelection in 1906, returning instead to his glovemaking business. Littauer served as delegate to the Republican National Conventions in 1900, 1904, 1908, and 1928, and was Regent of the University of the State of New York from 1912 to 1914.

On February 4, 1914, Littauer and his brother William were convicted of smuggling and conspiracy to defraud after admitting to having imported valuable jewels from Venice worth in excess of $40,000 without paying the necessary duty. Federal District Court Judge Edwin S. Thomas sentenced Littauer to six months in jail, though the sentence was suspended. In his decision, Thomas stressed that Littauer's high standing served to aggravate the crime: "For an ex-congressman so far to forget his oath taken five times and knowing so well the provisions of the law he helped to frame seems to be incomprehensible."

Littauer retired in 1927 and devoted his energies to education, medical research, and philanthropic work, including an endowment for the chair of Harry Austryn Wolfson, the first chair of Jewish studies at Harvard or any American university.

In 1936, Littauer donated $2 million to help found Harvard's Graduate School of Public Administration, which is known today as Harvard Kennedy School at Harvard University. One of the buildings on Harvard Kennedy School's main campus is named in his honor.

He also offered to build a hospital in memory of his father, Nathan Littauer. This act of generosity stirred the citizens of the community to contribute another $10,000, and on May 30, 1894, the original Nathan Littauer Hospital was opened.

Littauer died at his country home near New Rochelle, New York, on March 2, 1944, and was interred in the Jewish Cemetery in New Rochelle.

== Head coaching record ==
Year	Team	Overall	Conference	Standing	Bowl/playoffs
Harvard Crimson (Independent) (1881)
1881	Harvard	6–1–1			
Harvard:		6–1–1			
Total:		6–1–1			

== See also ==
- List of Jewish members of the United States Congress

U.S. House of Representatives
Preceded by N. Martin Curtis	Member of the U.S. House of Representatives from New York's 22nd congressional district March 4, 1897 – March 3, 1903	Succeeded by William Henry Draper
Preceded by James S. Sherman	Member of the U.S. House of Representatives from New York's 25th congressional district March 4, 1903 – March 3, 1907	Succeeded by Cyrus Durey
