= 97th New York State Legislature =

New York state legislative session

←	96th	98th	→
- The Old State Capitol (1879)

Overview
- Legislative body: New York State Legislature
- Jurisdiction: New York, United States
- Term: January 1 – December 31, 1874

Senate
- Members: 32
- President: Lt. Gov. John C. Robinson (R)
- Temporary President: William H. Robertson (R)
- Party control: Republican (18-12-2)

Assembly
- Members: 128
- Speaker: James W. Husted (R)
- Party control: Republican (71-53-3)

Sessions
- 1st: January 6 – April 30, 1874

The 97th New York State Legislature, consisting of the New York State Senate and the New York State Assembly, met from January 6 to April 30, 1874, during the second year of John A. Dix's governorship, in Albany.

== Background ==
Under the provisions of the New York Constitution of 1846, 32 Senators and 128 assemblymen were elected in single-seat districts; senators for a two-year term, assemblymen for a one-year term. The senatorial districts were made up of entire counties, except New York County (five districts) and Kings County (two districts). The Assembly districts were made up of entire towns, or city wards, forming a contiguous area, all within the same county.

At this time there were two major political parties: the Republican Party and the Democratic Party. The Liberal Republican Party also nominated a ticket.

== Elections ==
The 1873 New York state election was held on November 4. The statewide elective offices up for election were carried by five Democrats and two Republicans, all of which had been nominated also on the Liberal Republican ticket.

== Sessions ==
The Legislature met for the regular session at the Old State Capitol in Albany on January 6, 1874; and adjourned on April 30.

James W. Husted (R) was elected Speaker against Smith M. Weed (D).

On April 7, the Legislature elected Neil Gilmour as Superintendent of Public Instructions, with 87 votes against 51 for Abram B. Weaver, to succeed Weaver for a term of three years.

== State Senate ==
=== Districts ===
- 1st District: Queens, Richmond and Suffolk counties
- 2nd District: 1st, 2nd, 3rd, 4th, 5th, 7th, 11th, 13th, 15th, 19th and 20th wards of the City of Brooklyn
- 3rd District: 6th, 8th, 9th, 10th, 12th, 14th, 16th, 17th and 18th wards of the City of Brooklyn; and all towns in Kings County
- 4th District: 1st, 2nd, 3rd, 4th, 5th, 6th, 7th, 13th and 14th wards of New York City
- 5th District: 8th, 9th, 15th and 16th wards of New York City
- 6th District: 10th, 11th and 17th wards of New York City
- 7th District: 18th, 20th and 21st wards of New York City
- 8th District: 12th, 19th and 22nd wards of New York City
- 9th District: Putnam, Rockland and Westchester counties
- 10th District: Orange and Sullivan counties
- 11th District: Columbia and Dutchess counties
- 12th District: Rensselaer and Washington counties
- 13th District: Albany County
- 14th District: Greene and Ulster counties
- 15th District: Fulton, Hamilton, Montgomery, Saratoga and Schenectady counties
- 16th District: Clinton, Essex and Warren counties
- 17th District: Franklin and St. Lawrence counties
- 18th District: Jefferson and Lewis counties
- 19th District: Oneida County
- 20th District: Herkimer and Otsego counties
- 21st District: Madison and Oswego counties
- 22nd District: Onondaga and Cortland counties
- 23rd District: Chenango, Delaware and Schoharie counties
- 24th District: Broome, Tompkins and Tioga counties
- 25th District: Cayuga and Wayne counties
- 26th District: Ontario, Seneca and Yates counties
- 27th District: Chemung, Schuyler and Steuben counties
- 28th District: Monroe County
- 29th District: Genesee, Niagara and Orleans counties
- 30th District: Allegany, Livingston and Wyoming counties
- 31st District: Erie County
- 32nd District: Cattaraugus and Chautauqua counties
Note: There are now 62 counties in the State of New York. The counties which are not mentioned in this list had not yet been established, or sufficiently organized, the area being included in one or more of the abovementioned counties.

=== Members ===
The asterisk (*) denotes members of the previous Legislature who continued in office as members of this Legislature. John C. Jacobs, Frank Abbott, Benjamin Ray and Franklin W. Tobey changed from the Assembly to the Senate.

District	Senator	Party	Notes
1st	John A. King	Republican	
2nd	John W. Coe	Lib. Rep./Dem.	
3rd	John C. Jacobs*	Democrat	
4th	John Fox	Democrat	
5th	James W. Booth	Republican	
6th	Jacob A. Gross	Democrat	
7th	Thomas A. Ledwith	Democrat	
8th	Hugh H. Moore	Democrat	contested by Walter S. Pinckney (R), decision postponed to the next session
9th	William H. Robertson*	Republican	re-elected; elected president pro tempore
10th	Frank Abbott	Lib. Rep./Dem.	contested; seat vacated on February 4
10th	Edward M. Madden	Republican	seated on February 5
11th	Benjamin Ray*	Democrat	
12th	Roswell A. Parmenter	Democrat	
13th	Jesse C. Dayton	Democrat	
14th	Henry C. Connelly	Republican	
15th	Webster Wagner*	Republican	re-elected
16th	Franklin W. Tobey*	Republican	
17th	Wells S. Dickinson*	Republican	re-elected
18th	Andrew C. Middleton	Ind./Lib. Rep./Dem.	
19th	Samuel S. Lowery*	Republican	re-elected
20th	Archibald C. McGowan*	Republican	re-elected
21st	Charles Kellogg	Republican	
22nd	Daniel P. Wood*	Republican	re-elected
23rd	James G. Thompson	Republican	contested by William Yeomans Jr.
24th	John H. Selkreg	Republican	
25th	William B. Woodin*	Republican	re-elected
26th	William Johnson*	Democrat	re-elected
27th	George B. Bradley	Democrat	
28th	Jarvis Lord*	Democrat	re-elected
29th	Dan H. Cole	Republican	
30th	Abijah J. Wellman	Republican	
31st	John Ganson	Democrat	died on September 28, 1874
32nd	Albert G. Dow	Republican	

=== Employees ===
- Clerk: Henry A. Glidden
- Sergeant-at-Arms: Daniel K. Schram
- Doorkeeper: Frederick M. Burton

== State Assembly ==
=== Assemblymen ===
The asterisk (*) denotes members of the previous Legislature who continued as members of this Legislature.

District		Assemblymen	Party	Notes
Albany	1st	Frederick Schifferdecker	Republican	
Albany	2nd	Leopold C. G. Kshinka	Democrat	
Albany	3rd	Terrence J. Quinn	Democrat	
Albany	4th	Waters W. Braman	Republican	
Allegany		Orrin T. Stacy	Republican	
Broome		George Sherwood	Republican	
Cattaraugus	1st	Commodore P. Vedder*	Republican	
Cattaraugus	2nd	John Manley*	Republican	
Cayuga	1st	Leonard F. Hardy*	Republican	
Cayuga	2nd	Erastus H. Hussey	Republican	
Chautauqua	1st	Francis B. Brewer*	Republican	
Chautauqua	2nd	John D. Hiller*	Republican	
Chemung		Edmund Miller	Democrat	
Chenango		Harris H. Beecher	Republican	
Clinton		Smith M. Weed*	Democrat	
Columbia	1st	Henry Lawrence	Democrat	
Columbia	2nd	Alonzo H. Farrar	Republican	
Cortland		George W. Phillips*	Republican	
Delaware	1st	Benjamin J. Bassett	Republican	
Delaware	2nd	Matthew Griffin*	Republican	
Dutchess	1st	James Mackin*	Democrat	
Dutchess	2nd	Harvey G. Eastman	Republican	
Erie	1st	Patrick Hanrahan	Democrat	
Erie	2nd	Joseph W. Smith	Democrat	
Erie	3rd	Franklin A. Alberger*	Republican	
Erie	4th	John Nice*	Republican	
Erie	5th	Robert B. Foote*	Republican	
Essex		Gardiner Pope	Democrat	
Franklin		John P. Badger*	Republican	
Fulton and Hamilton		John Sunderlin	Republican	
Genesee		Elbert Townsend*	Republican	
Greene		Augustus Hill*	Democrat	
Herkimer		Warner Miller	Republican	
Jefferson	1st	Elam Persons*	Republican	
Jefferson	2nd	Hugh Smith	Republican	
Kings	1st	James F. Donahue*	Democrat	
Kings	2nd	John J. Allen	Republican	
Kings	3rd	Michael J. Coffey	Democrat	
Kings	4th	Theodore N. Melvin	Democrat	
Kings	5th	Eugene D. Berri	Republican	
Kings	6th	Jacob Worth*	Republican	
Kings	7th	Stephen J. Colahan	Democrat	
Kings	8th	George C. Bennett	Republican	
Kings	9th	John McGroarty	Democrat	
Lewis		John Herrick	Democrat	
Livingston		Jonathan B. Morey	Republican	
Madison	1st	Edward C. Philpot*	Republican	
Madison	2nd	Henry W. Carpenter	Republican	
Monroe	1st	George A. Goss*	Republican	
Monroe	2nd	George Taylor	Democrat	
Monroe	3rd	Leonard Burritt*	Republican	
Montgomery		Martin L. Stover	Republican	
New York	1st	James Healey*	Democrat	
New York	2nd	William P. Kirk	Democrat	
New York	3rd	James Hayes*	Democrat	
New York	4th	James Ryan*	Democrat	
New York	5th	Austin Leake	Republican	
New York	6th	Matthew Patten	Democrat	
New York	7th	Alfred Wagstaff Jr.	Democrat	
New York	8th	George Scherman	Rep./Apollo H.	
New York	9th	George B. Deane Jr.	Republican	
New York	10th	Louis C. Waehner	Democrat	
New York	11th	Knox McAfee	Republican	
New York	12th	Francis Murray	Democrat	
New York	13th	Charles S. Spencer	Republican	
New York	14th	James Daly	Democrat	
New York	15th	Joseph Blumenthal*	Democrat	
New York	16th	Peter Woods*	Democrat	
New York	17th	Andrew Blessing*	Democrat	
New York	18th	Bernard Biglin*	Republican	
New York	19th	Thomas O'Callaghan	Democrat	
New York	20th	John D. Coughlin	Democrat	
New York	21st	vacant		Assemblyman-elect Henry W. Genet (D) forfeited his seat
New York	21st	James E. Sullivan		elected to fill vacancy
Niagara	1st	Artemas W. Comstock	Republican	
Niagara	2nd	Orville C. Bordwell	Republican	
Oneida	1st	George W. Chadwick	Republican	
Oneida	2nd	Arthur F. Brown	Republican	
Oneida	3rd	John J. Parry	Republican	
Oneida	4th	Griffith O. Jones	Republican	
Onondaga	1st	Thomas G. Alvord	Independent	
Onondaga	2nd	George Barrow	Republican	
Onondaga	3rd	Charles Simon	Democrat	
Ontario	1st	Stephen H. Hammond	Democrat	
Ontario	2nd	Cyrillo S. Lincoln*	Republican	
Orange	1st	Augustus Denniston*	Republican	
Orange	2nd	Charles B. Wood	Democrat	
Orleans		Elisha S. Whalen*	Republican	
Oswego	1st	George B. Sloan	Republican	
Oswego	2nd	Willard Johnson*	Democrat	
Oswego	3rd	J. Lyman Bulkley*	Republican	
Otsego	1st	William H. Ely	Democrat	
Otsego	2nd	Henry Thorp	Lib. Rep./Dem.	
Putnam		Hamilton Fish II	Republican	
Queens	1st	L. Bradford Prince*	Republican	
Queens	2nd	James M. Oakley*	Democrat	
Rensselaer	1st	William V. Cleary*	Democrat	
Rensselaer	2nd	Robert Dickson	Republican	
Rensselaer	3rd	Jacob M. Witbeck	Democrat	
Richmond		Stephen D. Stephens Jr.	Democrat	
Rockland		William R. Knapp	Democrat	
St. Lawrence	1st	Seth G. Pope	Republican	
St. Lawrence	2nd	Dolphus S. Lynde*	Republican	
St. Lawrence	3rd	Jonah Sanford	Republican	
Saratoga	1st	George West*	Republican	
Saratoga	2nd	George S. Batcheller*	Republican	
Schenectady		Daniel P. McQueen*	Republican	
Schoharie		John B. Hoag	Democrat	
Schuyler		Harmon L. Gregory	Republican	
Seneca		William C. Hazelton	Democrat	
Steuben	1st	Stephen D. Shattuck	Democrat	
Steuben	2nd	Charles F. Houghton	Republican	
Suffolk		Nathan D. Petty	Republican	
Sullivan		George M. Beebe*	Democrat	on November 3, 1874, elected to the 44th U.S. Congress
Tioga		Jerome B. Landfield*	Republican	
Tompkins		William L. Bostwick	Republican	
Ulster	1st	Robert A. Snyder	Republican	
Ulster	2nd	Hector Abeel	Democrat	
Ulster	3rd	John D. Winfield	Democrat	
Warren		Austin W. Holden	Democrat	
Washington	1st	Alexander B. Law	Republican	
Washington	2nd	Emerson E. Davis	Democrat	
Wayne	1st	Emory W. Gurnee	Democrat	
Wayne	2nd	Henry M. Clark	Ind. Rep.	
Westchester	1st	William Cauldwell	Democrat	
Westchester	2nd	Amherst Wight Jr.*	Republican	
Westchester	3rd	James W. Husted*	Republican	elected Speaker
Wyoming		Samuel W. Tewksbury	Republican	
Yates		George W. Spencer	Democrat	

=== Employees ===
- Clerk: John O'Donnell
- Sergeant-at-Arms: Frederick C. Fiske
- Assistant Sergeant-at-Arms: DeWitt Griffin
- Doorkeeper: Eugene L. Demers
- Assistant Doorkeeper: James Hogan
- Assistant Doorkeeper: Michael Maher
- Stenographer: Worden E. Payne

== Sources ==
- Civil List and Constitutional History of the Colony and State of New York compiled by Edgar Albert Werner (1884; see pg. 276 for Senate districts; pg. 290 for senators; pg. 298–304 for Assembly districts; and pg. 374f for assemblymen)
- Journal of the Senate (97th Session) (1874)
- REPUBLICAN ASSEMBLY CAUCUSES in NYT on January 6, 1874
- THE STATE GOVERNMENT in The Newtown Register on January 15, 1874
- Life Sketches of Government Officers and Members of the Legislature of the State of New York in 1874 by W. H. McElroy and Alexander McBride
