= Henry J. Daggett =

American politician (1826–1910)

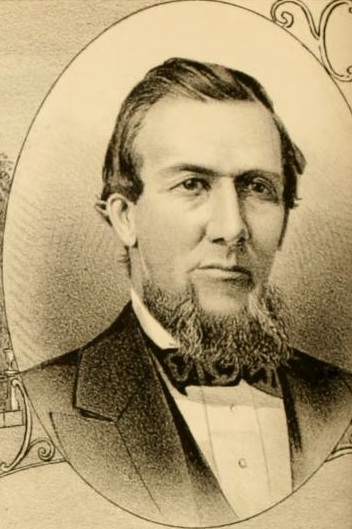
Henry J. Daggett (1877)

Henry J. Daggett (August 16, 1826 – October 27, 1910) was an American politician from New York.

== Life ==
He was born on August 16, 1826, in Boston, Massachusetts, the son of Henry Daggett (died 1870) and Mary Daggett (died 1871). In 1838, the family moved to Oswego County, New York, first to Oswego, and about 1842 to New Haven. He attended the public schools, and worked on the family farm. About 1845, he joined the merchant marine on Lake Ontario, and after four years was licensed as a master mariner. He then commanded sailing vessels mostly used for the grain trade until 1863. Afterwards he engaged in grain and dairy farming, flour milling, the lumber trade and the forwarding business. He married Frances L. Holly (c.1831–1899).

Daggett was Supervisor of the Town of New Haven from 1872 to 1876, a member of the New York State Assembly (Oswego Co., 3rd D.) in 1875, and Chairman of the Board of Supervisors of Oswego County in 1876.

He died on October 27, 1910; and was buried at the New Haven Cemetery.

== Sources ==
New York State Assembly
Preceded by J. Lyman Bulkley	New York State Assembly; Oswego County, 3rd District; 1875	Succeeded by John Preston
