= William Foster (New York state senator) =

American politician

William Foster (December 27, 1813 Lenham, Kent, England – July 26, 1893 Syracuse, Onondaga County, New York) was an American politician from New York.

== Life ==
He attended schools in Maidstone and Herstmonceux. In 1830, he emigrated to the United States, and became a clerk in a tannery near Oneida Lake. In 1837, he married Mary Cramp (1812–1883), and they had nine children. The couple removed to Ottawa, Illinois, and engaged in farming.

In 1839, he settled in Cleveland, New York and became again a bookkeeper in a tannery, and after the death of the owner, purchased the tannery. In 1851, he became a partner in the Union Glass Company which manufactured window glass. In 1867, he became a director of the New York and Oswego Midland Railroad.

He entered politics as a Whig, then became an Abolitionist, and joined the Republican Party upon its foundation. He was at times President of the Village of Cleveland; and Supervisor of the Town of Constantia. He was a member of the New York State Senate (21st D.) in 1872 and 1873.

He died at the home of his daughter Ellen (1838–1897) in Syracuse, and was buried at the Riverside Cemetery in Oswego.

== Sources ==
- Life Sketches of Executive Officers and Members of the Legislature of the State of New York by William H. McElroy & Alexander McBride (1873; pg. 67f) [e-book]
- Bio transcribed from The Landmarks of Oswego County, NY (1895), at RootsWeb
- Extensive bio, at Rice University

New York State Senate
Preceded by William H. Brand	New York State Senate; 21st District; 1872–1873	Succeeded by Charles Kellogg
