= John I. Gilbert =

American politician

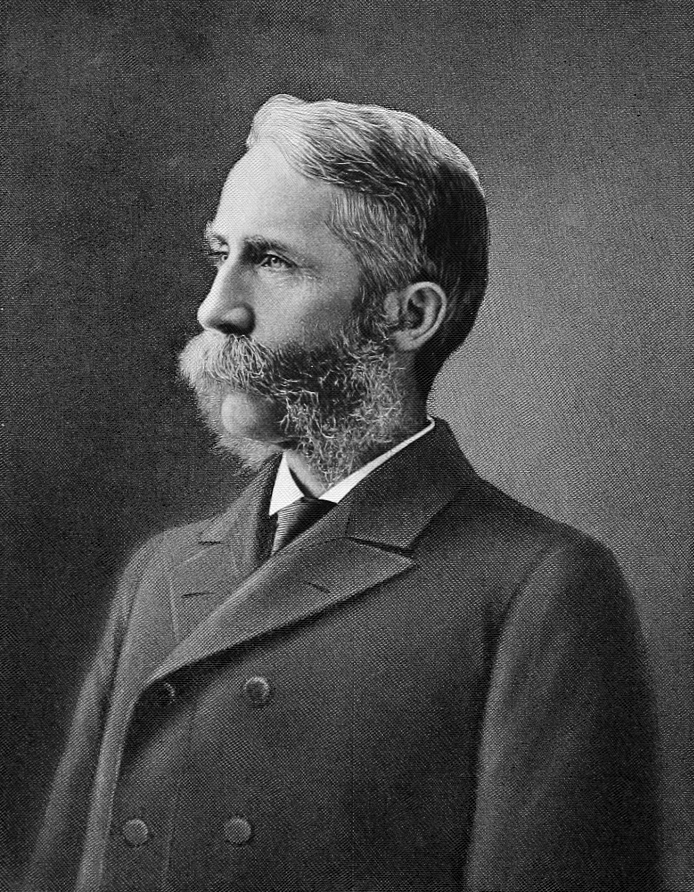

Member of the New York State Senate
- In office 1884–1885
- Constituency: Franklin County

Member of the New York State Assembly
- In office 1876–1878
- Constituency: 20th District

Personal details
- Born: John Ingersoll Gilbert; October 11, 1837 Pittsford, Vermont, US
- Died: December 19, 1904 (aged 67) Malone, New York, US
- Party: Republican
- Education: University of Vermont

John Ingersoll Gilbert (October 11, 1837 – December 19, 1904) was an American politician from New York.

== Life ==
John I. Gilbert was born in Pittsford, Vermont on October 11, 1837. He attended Castleton Seminary, North Granville Academy, and Barre Academy, and graduated from the University of Vermont in 1859. Then he taught school. He was Principal of the Royalton Academy for two years, and of the Franklin Academy in Malone for six years. He also studied law, was admitted to the bar, and practiced in Malone.

Gilbert was a member of the New York State Assembly (Franklin Co.) in 1876, 1877 and 1878.

He was a member of the New York State Senate (20th D.) in 1884 and 1885. He was a delegate to the 1884 Republican National Convention.

At the New York state election, 1889 he ran for Secretary of State of New York, but was defeated by Democrat Frank Rice. Gilbert was a delegate to the New York State Constitutional Convention of 1894.

He died at his home in Malone on December 19, 1904.

New York State Assembly
Preceded by John P. Badger	New York State Assembly; Franklin County; 1876–1878	Succeeded by William D. Brennan
New York State Senate
Preceded by Dolphus S. Lynde	New York State Senate; 20th District; 1884–1885	Succeeded by Charles L. Knapp
