= John P. Badger =

American lawyer and politician

John Peaslee Badger (August 3, 1834 – February 23, 1912) was an American lawyer and politician from New York.

== Life ==
Badger was born on August 3, 1834, in Ossipee, New Hampshire, the son of William P. C. Badger. He moved to New York with his parents when he was an infant.

Badger initially learned the carpenter. He then worked as a lumberman, merchant, and starch manufacturer. When he was around thirty-five, he began taking an interest in politics and became the recognized leader of the Republican Party in the town of Burke. Originally a Democratic stronghold, he helped establish Republican dominance in the town. He began studying law when he was thirty-six, graduating from Albany Law School in November 1871. He was admitted to the bar shortly afterwards and practiced law in the county. He practiced law at different points with Judge Taylor, Leslie C. Wead, John I. Gilbert, Frederick D. Kilburn, William P. Cantwell, his son William, and his brother-in-law Josiah Idle. He also formed a firm with Thomas and John N. Cantwell under the firm name Badger & Cantwell. A few years before his death, he formed a partnership with his son John Jr. under the firm name Badger & Son.

Badger was originally a member of the American Party, voting for Millard Fillmore for president. He became a Republican after the former party disintegrated. He was elected town supervisor in 1870 and 1872. In 1872, he was elected to the New York State Assembly as a Republican, representing Franklin County. He served in the Assembly in 1873, 1874, and 1875. He then moved to Malone, where he lived for the rest of his life. In 1877, he was elected district attorney of Franklin County, an office he held for six years.

Badger was president of the Alice Hyde Hospital Association, president of the board of trustees of the Northern New York Institution for Deaf Mutes, and a director of the Farmers National Bank. He was a member of the Freemasons. He belonged to the village's First Baptist Church. In 1855, he married Emily Elizabeth Phelps of Chateaugay. Their children were William P., John P. Jr., and Mary Matilda. Both of the sons were lawyers.

Badger died at home on February 23, 1912.

New York State Assembly
Preceded by James H. Pierce	New York State Assembly; Franklin County; 1873–1875	Succeeded by John I. Gilbert
