= George C. Bennett (New York politician) =

Newspaper printer and politician

George C. Bennett (September 24, 1824 – January 3, 1885) was an English-American newspaper printer and politician.

== Life ==
Bennett was born on September 24, 1824, in London, England. He immigrated to America in 1836, when he was twelve.

Bennett initially worked as a cabinet maker for three years. Not finding the labor to his liking, he spent a year working as a farmer with his uncle in Morris County, New Jersey. In the spring of 1841, he began working for John W. Oliver in New York City and began learning the printing trade in the printing firm Sackett & Sargent. He then began working with Joseph Snowden in a New York City office, followed by working successively in several New York City printing offices.

In December 1846 Bennett moved to Williamsburg, Brooklyn. In January 1847, he began publishing a daily newspaper called the Morning Post with two other printers and writer Isaac Anderson Smith. He ended up a proprietor of the paper along with Thomas A. Devyr and Joseph Taylor. After a year with the paper, he and Aaron Smith started the Williamsburgh Daily Times in 1848. When Williamsburgh was consolidated with Brooklyn in 1854, the paper was renamed to reflect the consolidation. Smith retired from the paper after three years, and Bennett ran the paper alone until he formed a new partnership with Bernard Peters in 1868. He left the Times in 1875, with George H. Fisher becoming his successor in the paper.

Bennett was originally a Free Soil Whig, but he joined the Republican Party when it was founded. In 1871, he was elected to the New York State Assembly as a Republican over Democrat Joseph Droll, representing the Kings County 8th District (Wards 15, 17, and 18 of Brooklyn). He served in the Assembly in 1872 and 1874. In 1872, dissatisfied with the party's local management and being a long-time admirer of Horace Greeley, he endorsed the Liberal Republican Party. He returned to the Republican Party after the former party failed and many of its member joined the Democrats.

In the 1874 United States House of Representatives election Bennett unsuccessfully ran in New York's 4th congressional district, losing to Archibald M. Bliss. He became a member of the board of education in 1870. In 1877 he was appointed Commissioner of City Works. As Commissioner he was indicted for malfeasance in office, with him and John W. Flaherty being charged with defrauding the city out of $50,000 by giving sinecure positions. They were both found guilty and each fined 250 dollars. He then retired from that office and public life, devoting his time to improving the Evergreens Cemetery as president of its board of trustees. He was a delegate to the 1884 Republican National Convention.

Bennett was married to Sarah Ann. Their seven children included Charles Goodwin.

Bennett died at home from Bright's disease on January 3, 1885. He was buried in the Cemetery of the Evergreens.

New York State Assembly
| Preceded by Samuel F. Conselyea | New York State Assembly; Kings County, 8th District; 1872 | Succeeded by Adrian M. Suydam |
| Preceded by Adrian M. Suydam | New York State Assembly; Kings County, 2nd District; 1874 | Succeeded by Bernard Silverman |
