= Edward M. Madden =

American politician (1818–1885)

Personal details
- Born: February 1, 1818 Crawford, New York, U.S.
- Died: July 17, 1885 (aged 67) Middletown, New York, U.S.
- Party: Republican
- Other political affiliations: Democratic (before 1854)

Edward Millspaugh Madden (February 1, 1818 – July 17, 1885) was an American merchant, manufacturer and politician from New York.

== Life ==
Edward Millspaugh Madden was born on February 1, 1818, in Crawford, New York to Cornelius Madden and Susannah Millspaugh

At age nine, he began to work in a cotton factory at Walden. He then worked at a tin shop, and in a hardware store, became a retail merchant, and eventually opened a saw factory in Middletown. In 1843, he married Eudocia M. Robinson (died 1877).

He entered politics as a Democrat, and was a delegate to the 1852 Democratic state convention. He joined the Republican Party upon its foundation. He was a member of the New York State Senate (9th D.) in 1856 and 1857; and a delegate to the 1864 Republican National Convention.

He was again a member of the State Senate (10th D.) in 1872 and 1873. In 1874, Madden contested the election of Frank Abbott to the State Senate, was seated in the 97th New York State Legislature on February 5, and sat also in the State Senate in 1875. He was a delegate to the 1876 Republican National Convention.

He was again a member of the State Senate (13th D.) in 1880 and 1881; and was Chairman of the 1882 Republican state convention.

He died on July 17, 1885, in his residence at Middletown, New York, at the age of 67 years old.

New York State Senate
Preceded by John D. Watkins	New York State Senate; 9th District; 1856–1857	Succeeded by Osmer B. Wheeler
Preceded by William M. Graham	New York State Senate; 10th District; 1872–1873	Succeeded by Frank Abbott
Preceded by Frank Abbott	New York State Senate; 10th District; 1874–1875	Succeeded by Daniel B. St. John
Preceded by Hamilton Harris	New York State Senate; 13th District; 1880–1881	Succeeded by James Mackin
