= Hugh H. Moore =

American politician

Hugh H. Moore (born June 4, 1844 County Limerick, Ireland; died after 1920) was an American politician from New York.

== Life ==
The family emigrated first to Canada, then to the United States, and settled in New York City. He attended a church school in Canada, and the common schools in New York City. Then he became a house-painter, and later a contractor. During the American Civil War he fought with the 133rd New York Volunteers, accompanying his brother without having enlisted. In May 1868, he married Anna L. McGuire.

He was a member of the New York State Senate (8th D.) in 1874 and 1875. He did not attend almost the whole session of 1874, due to illness.

In March 1912, he was appointed as Clerk of the Municipal Court in the 8th District, retiring from that office in December 1920.

== Sources ==
- Life Sketches of Government Officers and Members of the Legislature of the State of New York in 1875 by W. H. McElroy and Alexander McBride (pg. 91f) [e-book]

New York State Senate
Preceded by Daniel F. Tiemann	New York State Senate; 8th District; 1874–1875	Succeeded by Francis M. Bixby
