= Cyrus Durey =

American politician

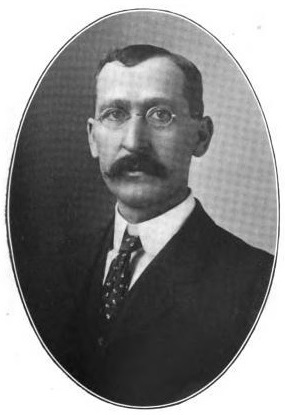

Member of the U.S. House of Representatives from New York's 25th district
- In office March 4, 1907 – March 3, 1911
- Preceded by: Lucius N. Littauer
- Succeeded by: Theron Akin

Personal details
- Born: May 16, 1864 Caroga, New York
- Died: January 4, 1933 (aged 68) Albany, New York
- Resting place: North Bush Cemetery, Johnstown, New York
- Party: Democratic
- Education: Johnstown Academy in New York
- Profession: Businessman

Cyrus Durey (May 16, 1864 – January 4, 1933) was an American businessman and politician who served two terms as a U.S. representative from New York from 1907 to 1911.

== Biography ==
Born in Caroga, New York, Durey attended the common schools and Johnstown Academy. He was supervisor's clerk. Supervisor of Caroga in 1889 and 1890. He engaged in the lumber and real-estate business.

=== Political career ===
He was appointed postmaster of Johnstown on August 19, 1898, and served until February 28, 1907. He served as member of the Republican State committee in 1904–1906.

==== Congress ====
Durey was elected as a Republican to the Sixtieth and Sixty-first Congresses (March 4, 1907 – March 3, 1911). He was an unsuccessful candidate for reelection in 1910 to the Sixty-second Congress.

=== Later career and death ===
After leaving Congress, he was appointed on March 20, 1911, collector of internal revenue, fourteenth district of New York, and served until September 30, 1914. He served as delegate to the Republican National Conventions in 1912 and 1920.

He was again appointed collector of internal revenue on September 30, 1921, and served until his death at Albany, New York, January 4, 1933. He was interred in North Bush Cemetery, near Johnstown, New York.

U.S. House of Representatives
| Preceded by Lucius N. Littauer | Member of the U.S. House of Representatives from New York's 25th congressional district March 4, 1907 – March 3, 1911 | Succeeded by Theron Akin |
