= Stephen J. Colahan =

American lawyer and politician

New York State Assembly
- In office 1873–1874

Personal details
- Born: December 25, 1841 New York City, New York, USA
- Died: December 10, 1874 (aged 32) Williamsburg, Brooklyn, New York, USA
- Party: Democratic Party
- Children: 2
- Education: St. John's College; New York University School of Law

Stephen J. Colahan (December 25, 1841 – December 10, 1874) was an American lawyer and politician from New York.

== Early life and education ==
Colahan was born on December 25, 1841, in New York City, New York, the son of J. H. and Mary Colahan. The son of a judge, Colahan attended St. John's College in Fordham and New York University School of Law, graduating from the latter in 1862. After his graduation, he married and went on a European tour. His observations from the tour were published in a series of letters to leading newspapers.

== Career ==
In 1863 and 1864, he held an official position with the War Department in Washington, D.C. He then began to practice law, forming a four-year partnership with Philip S. Crooke. Colahan was elected to the 1867 New York State Constitutional Convention, its youngest member. In the convention, he made a speech against a clause to prohibit the sale of intoxicating alcohol that was republished in pamphlet form. He also attempted to insert a clause that would require the creation of a State Board to inquire into qualifications to practice medicine and distribute drugs. The clause was left to the Legislature, but it attracted public interest that lead the State Medical Board to unanimously adopt a series of complimentary resolutions and H. J. Raymond of The New York Times (and other journalists) to support and endorse the clause.

In 1871, Colahan became clerk of the Brooklyn City Court. He was a delegate to the 1872 Democratic National Convention. In the 1872 United States House of Representatives election, he unsuccessfully ran in New York's 4th congressional district, losing to his law partner Crooke. In 1873, he was elected to the New York State Assembly as a Democrat, representing the Kings County 7th District (Wards 13 and 14 of Brooklyn). He served in the Assembly in 1874. He was re-elected to the office in November 1874, a month before his death.

== Personal life ==
Colahan died at home in Williamsburg from diabetes on December 10, 1874. Two days before his death, he called a panel of 1,000 potential jurors for the Beecher-Tilton trial, only to leave after a short time due to feeling unwell. He had a wife and two children. Sylvester Malone delivered the eulogy at his funeral. He was buried in Calvary Cemetery.

New York State Assembly
Preceded by Frederick Cocheu	New York State Assembly; Kings County, 7th District; 1874	Succeeded by Michael O'Keefe
