= James F. Donahue =

Member of the New York State Assembly

James Francis Donahue (December 25, 1843 – July 20, 1881) was an American merchant and politician from New York.

== Life ==
Donahue was born on December 25, 1843, in Brooklyn, New York, the son of Timothy and Mary Donahue. His parents were Irish immigrants from Corry.

In February 1862, during the American Civil War, Donahue enlisted and was mustered in as a private in Company B of the 84th New York Volunteer Infantry. He deserted in June 1863.

Donahue worked in various occupations since boyhood, including as a hatter, a candlemaker, and a ship-caulker. By the 1870s, he was a successful merchant.

In 1872, Donahue was elected to the New York State Assembly as a Democrat, representing the Kings County 1st District (Wards 1, 2, and 5 of Brooklyn). He served in the Assembly in 1873 and 1874.

Donahue died at home on July 20, 1881.

New York State Assembly
| Preceded by David C. Aitken | New York State Assembly; Kings County, 1st District; 1873–1874 | Succeeded by Daniel Bradley |
