= Benjamin Doolittle =

American politician

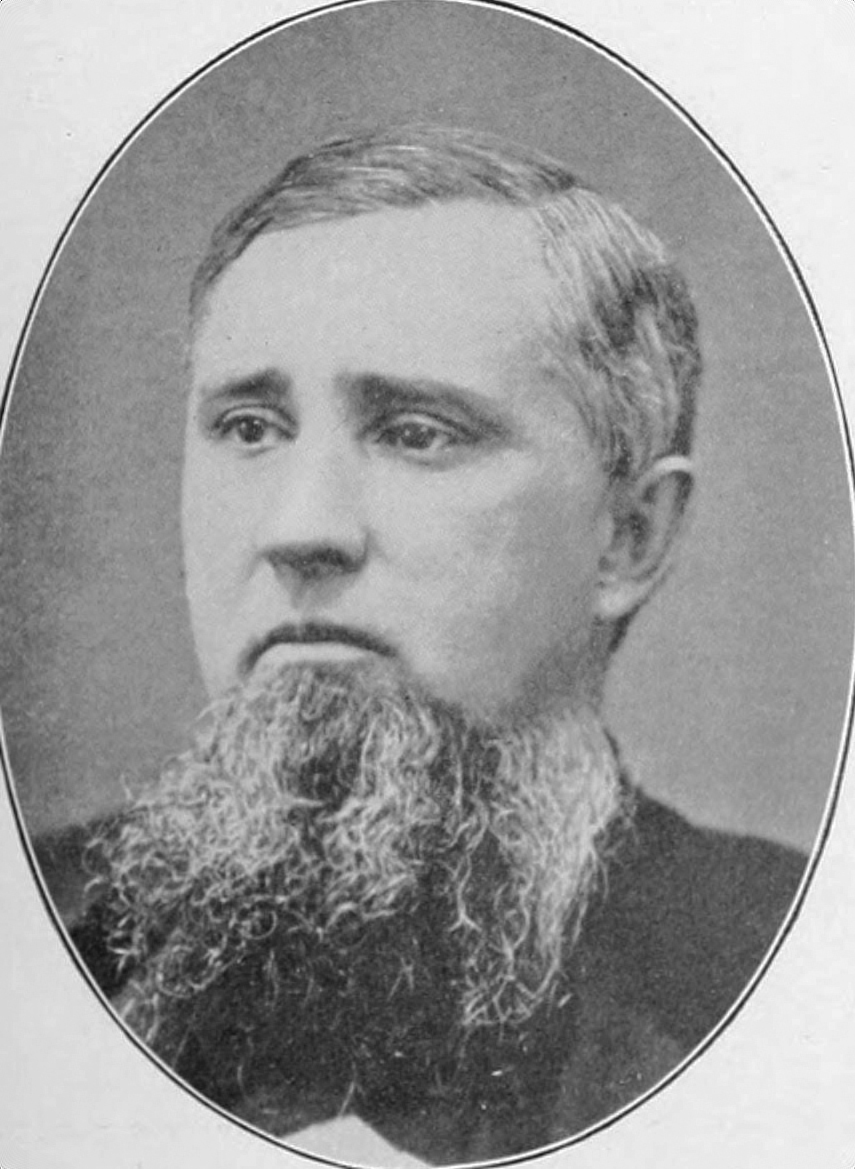
Benjamin Doolittle

Benjamin Doolittle (December 29, 1825 in Lenox, Madison County, New York – February 6, 1895 in Oswego, New York) was an American politician from New York.

== Life ==
He was the son of Francis W. Doolittle and Olive (Lee) Doolittle. In 1847, he removed to Oswego and became a merchant and manufacturer. In 1849, he married Susan Hitchcock (died 1852). On September 20, 1852, he married Laura J. Mayer Rowe (died 1858), and they had three children. On March 23, 1859, he married Roxy Wilcox, and they had six children.

He was a member of the New York State Assembly (Oswego Co., 1st D.) in 1869; and Mayor of Oswego, New York in 1874.

He was a member of the New York State Senate (21st D.) in 1876 and 1877.

== Sources ==
- Benjamin Doolittle at Oswego County Governments
- OBITUARY NOTES; Ex-Senator and ex-Assemblyman Benjamin Doolittle... in NYT on February 7, 1895

New York State Assembly
Preceded by John A. Place	New York State Assembly; Oswego County, 1st District; 1869	Succeeded by DeWitt C. Littlejohn
New York State Senate
Preceded by Charles Kellogg	New York State Senate; 21st District; 1876–1877	Succeeded by John W. Lippitt
