= Andrew C. Middleton =

American politician

Andrew C. Middleton (April 5, 1824 Rutland, Jefferson County, New York – 1909) was an American politician from New York.

== Life ==
He was the son of Samuel Middleton (1796–1873) and Seraph Middleton (1802–1883). He attended the common schools, and then worked on his father's farm and taught school.

He was Superintendent Common Schools of the Town of Rutland from 1849 to 1851; and Supervisor of the Town of Rutland from 1858 to 1860, and in 1868.

He was a member of the New York State Senate (18th D.) in 1874 and 1875, nominated on a reform ticket by a convention of farmers and endorsed by the Liberal Republicans and the Democrats.

He was buried at the Brookside Cemetery in Watertown.

New York State Senate
Preceded by Norris Winslow	New York State Senate; 18th District; 1874–1875	Succeeded by James F. Starbuck
