= John W. Coe =

American politician

- Born: May 20, 1840; New York City, U.S.
- Died: December 17, 1889 (aged 49); Brooklyn, Kings County, New York
- Occupation: Politician
- Relatives: Descendants of Robert Coe

John William Coe (May 20, 1840 – December 17, 1889) was an American politician from New York.

== Life ==
John William Coe was born in New York City on May 26, 1839. He received a good common school education, and then turned his attention to mercantile pursuits. On June 20, 1858, he married Eliza A. Ramapo. On February 11, 1860, he married Elizabeth A. Jackson, and they had four children. In the 1870s, he was engaged in business as a carriage manufacturer in Brooklyn.

For many years Coe was prominent in the public affairs of Brooklyn. Under his direction many public improvements were carried out, among them Newtown Creek, Jamaica Turnpike, and Eastern Parkway. He was the chief factor in securing the charter for the construction of the Brooklyn Bridge.

He was for many years an active Republican, but joined the Liberal Republican Party in 1872, and was a delegate to the Liberal Republican National Convention in Cincinnati which nominated Horace Greeley for President.

In 1870, Coe he was elected a member of the Board of Supervisors, and proved such a popular representative, that, in 1872, the Liberal Republicans returned him to the Board from a strong Republican district. His second term as Supervisor was signalized by a most stubborn contest for the Chairmanship of the Board. After a five-month campaign, Coe was elected to that office.

In the fall of 1873, the Liberal Republicans placed him in nomination for the New York State Senate. The action of the convention was endorsed by the Democrats, and the result was his election over the incumbent John C. Perry.

Coe's political position in the 97th New York State Legislature was a particularly independent one, having been nominated by a distinctively Liberal Republican convention, and endorsed by the Democrats. He made no pledges whatever to the latter, and, in refusing to do so, told them that they had simply to choose between him and his Republican opponent. As a consequence, party ties sat very loosely upon him, and he was left free to follow an unbiased judgment in considering all questions brought before the Senate.

He came to the Legislature with the reputation of having materially assisted in unearthing the labyrinth of frauds in the jail of Kings County, through which the public was swindled out of thousands of dollars annually. He announced his entrance into the Senate by casting his vote in favor of awarding the contested seat of the 10th District to Edward M. Madden. His speech, in explanation of his action, proved him to be a clear and cogent speaker. Coe was a member of the Committees on Cities and Public Health.

== Death ==
He died on January 17, 1890, in Brooklyn, Kings County, New York.

== Sources ==
New York State Senate
Preceded by John C. Perry	New York State Senate; 2nd District; 1874–1875	Succeeded by John R. Kennaday
