= 1861 New York City mayoral election =

- December 3, 1861
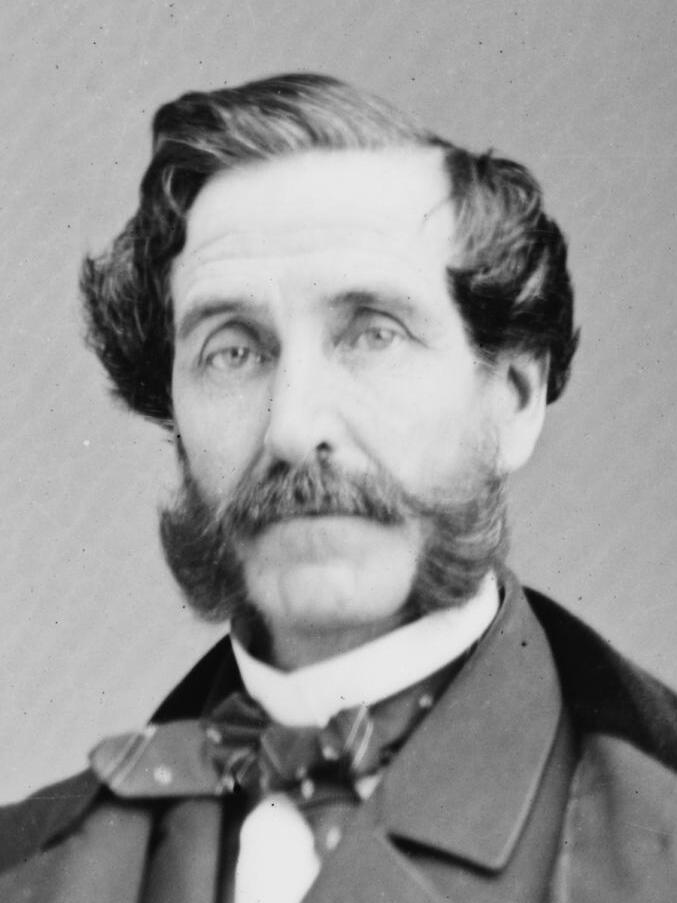

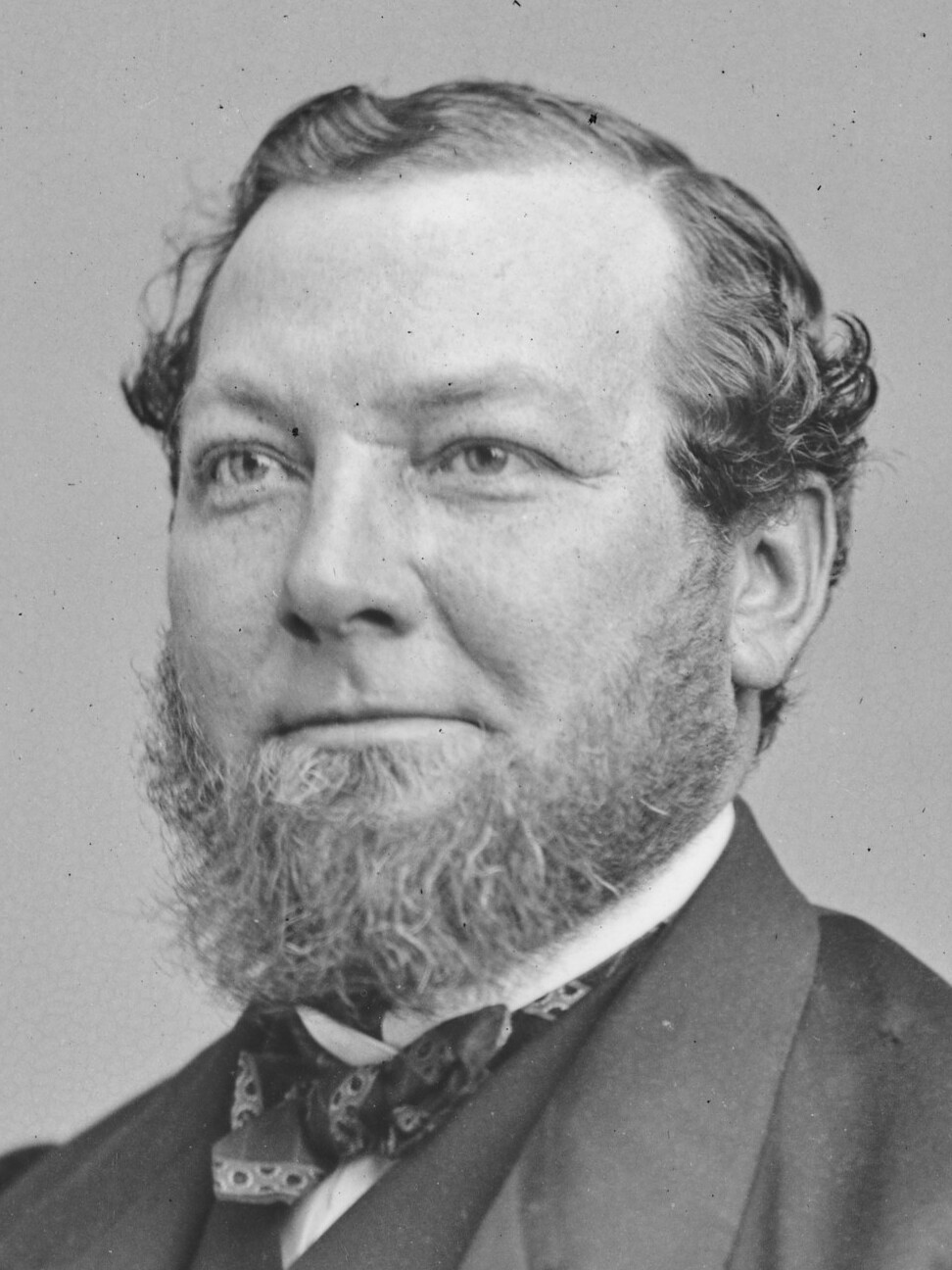

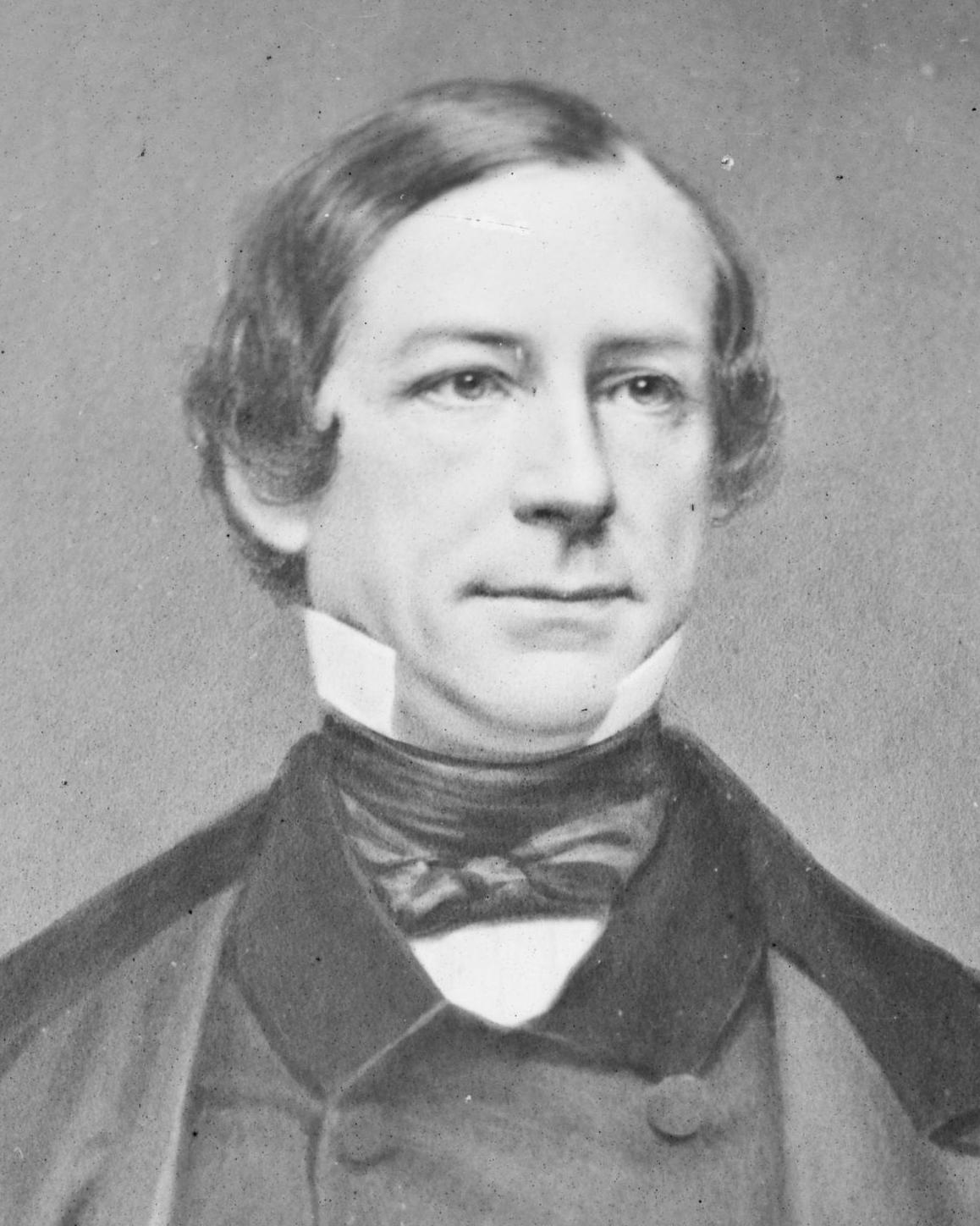
Nominee	George Opdyke	C. Godfrey Gunther	Fernando Wood
Party	Republican	Democratic	Independent Democratic
Alliance	People's Union	Tammany Hall	Mozart Hall
Popular vote	25,380	24,767	24,167
Percentage	34.2%	33.3%	32.5%
- Ward results Opdyke: 30–40% 40–50% 50–60% Gunther: 30–40% 40–50% 50–60% Wood: 30–40% 40–50% 50–60%
Mayor before election
Fernando Wood
Democratic
Elected mayor
George Opdyke
Republican

An election for Mayor of New York City was held on December 3, 1861.

Incumbent mayor Fernando Wood ran for re-election to a second consecutive term in office. In a close three-way race, Wood finished third behind Republican George Opdyke and Democratic nominee C. Godfrey Gunther. Opdyke was the first Republican elected mayor of New York City.

== Background ==
Following his defeat in the 1857 election by an alliance of Republicans, Know-Nothings, and former Tammany Hall supporters, Fernando Wood was declared politically dead. However, he purchased the New York Daily News, and, after an unsuccessful attempt to gain control of Tammany Hall, founded his own political society, known as Mozart Hall. In 1859, he defeated William Frederick Havemeyer and Republican nominee George Opdyke to return to office for a third non-consecutive term.

== General election ==
=== Candidates ===
- C. Godfrey Gunther, fur merchant (Tammany Hall)
- George Opdyke, banker, former Assemblyman, and candidate for mayor in 1859 (Republican)
- Fernando Wood, incumbent mayor since 1860 (Mozart Hall)

=== Results ===
1861 New York City mayoral election
Party	Candidate	Votes	%	±%
Republican	George Opdyke	25,380	34.15%	▲6.79
Democratic	C. Godfrey Gunther	24,767	33.33%	▼1.06
Independent Democratic	Fernando Wood (incumbent)	24,167	32.52%	▼5.73
Total votes		74,314	100.00%	

=== Results by ward ===
Results by wards
Ward	Opdyke Republican		Gunther Democratic		Wood Independent Democratic		Total
Ward	Votes	%	Votes	%	Votes	%	Total
1	409	27.30%	505	33.71%	584	38.99%	1,498
2	211	50.36%	96	22.91%	112	26.73%	419
3	165	32.74%	138	27.38%	201	39.88%	504
4	261	12.02%	871	40.12%	1,039	47.86%	2,171
5	799	38.54%	675	32.56%	599	28.90%	2,073
6	255	9.00%	1,717	60.63%	860	30.37%	2,832
7	1,018	27.39%	1,060	28.52%	1,639	44.09%	3,717
8	1,082	32.59%	1,227	36.96%	1,011	30.45%	3,320
9	2,407	49.49%	1,386	28.49%	1,071	22.02%	4,864
10	867	32.97%	1,107	42.09%	656	24.94%	2,630
11	1,349	24.89%	2,152	39.71%	1,918	35.40%	5,419
12	822	29.10%	1,456	51.54%	547	19.36%	2,825
13	984	32.01%	1,038	33.77%	1,052	34.22%	3,074
14	378	14.77%	832	32.50%	1,350	52.73%	2,560
15	1,525	56.02%	562	20.65%	635	23.33%	2,722
16	2,145	50.14%	851	19.89%	1,282	29.97%	4,278
17	2,035	30.95%	2,521	38.34%	2,019	30.71%	6,575
18	1,940	39.17%	1,253	25.30%	1,760	35.53%	4,953
19	1,161	29.56%	1,235	31.45%	1,531	38.99%	3,927
20	2,085	38.75%	1,689	31.39%	1,607	29.86%	5,381
21	2,031	46.22%	1,080	24.58%	1,283	29.20%	4,394
22	1,451	34.73%	1,316	31.50%	1,411	33.77%	4,178
Totals	25,380	34.15%	24,767	33.33%	24,167	32.52%	74,314
