= 1863 New York City mayoral election =

- December 1, 1863
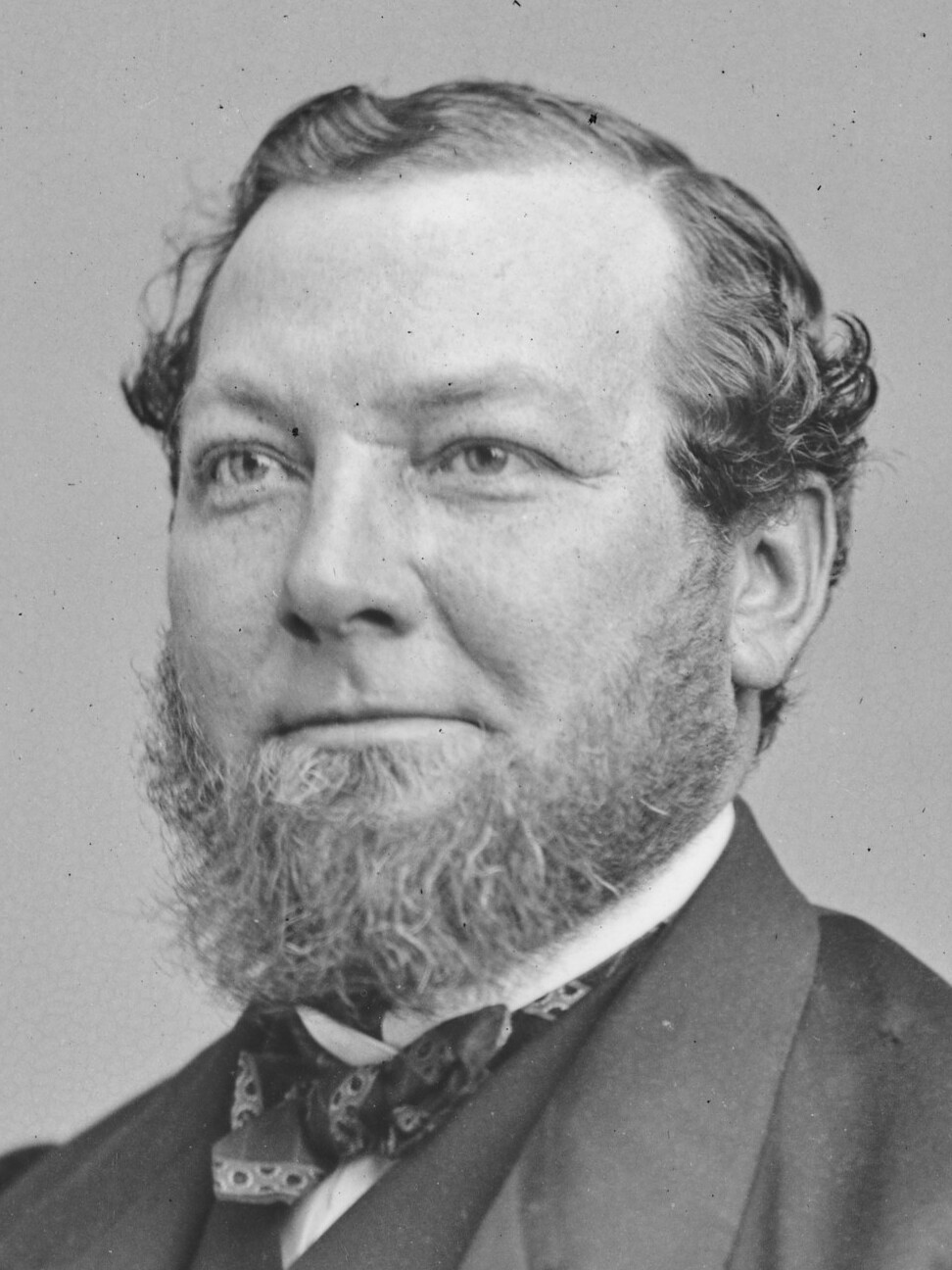

Nominee	C. Godfrey Gunther	Francis I. A. Boole	Orison Blunt
Party	Independent Democratic	Democratic	National Union
Alliance	McKeon Democracy	Tammany Hall; Mozart Hall
Popular vote	29,121	22,597	19,383
Percentage	40.96%	31.78%	27.26%
Mayor before election
George Opdyke
Republican
Elected mayor
C. Godfrey Gunther
Democratic

The 1863 New York City mayoral election took place on December 1st, 1863, to elect the 78th Mayor of New York City.

C. Godfrey Gunther, a fur merchant and former candidate for mayor in 1861, beat fellow Democrat Francis I. A. Boole and Union candidate Orison Blunt.

== Background ==
After his assistance in both suppressing the July 1863 New York City draft riots and enacting conscription throughout the city, Republican Mayor George Opdyke's re-election prospects were effectively dead. So damaged was his political reputation that he wasn't even re-nominated.

The Republicans and Unionists, now at a serious political disadvantage, nominated Orison Blunt, a gun-maker and member of the Board of Aldermen.

Tammany Hall meanwhile nominated Francis I. A. Boole, a War Democrat and rather corrupt city official notable for heading the street cleaning department. Gustavus Myers dubbed he was, "considered as nauseating a type of the politician as Tammany could bring forth." Mozart Hall decided to back his nomination, however he received little if any support from them, with its founder former Mayor Fernando Wood having refused to speak at the meeting called to ratify his nomination.

With the machine-Democrats nominating such a weak candidate and at a time where popularity for the Civil War was at an all-time low, rebels from both parties, as well as former Wood supporters (mostly European minorities) split to form a temporary coalition of working class Irish and Germans. After strong backing from the city's German newspapers, C. Godfrey Gunther, a German himself and a Copperhead Democrat, emerged as a third-party candidate.

== General election ==
=== Candidates ===
- C. Godfrey Gunther, fur merchant and Tammany Hall candidate for mayor in 1861.
- Francis I. A. Boole, City Inspector, member of the Board of Aldermen from the 11th ward (Lower East Side area), and brother of Rev. William H. Boole.
- Orison Blunt, gun-maker, member of the Board of Aldermen from the 15th ward (Greenwich Village area), and independent candidate for New York's 6th congressional district in 1862.

=== Results ===
1863 New York City Mayoral Election
Party	Candidate	Votes	%
Independent Democratic	C. Godfrey Gunther	29,121	40.96%
Democratic	Francis I. A. Boole	22,597	31.78%
National Union	Orison Blunt	19,383	27.26%
Total votes		71,101	100.00%
Democratic gain from Republican			

=== Analysis ===
The result was widely considered an upset for Boole. Ward results showed that in the 17th, 18th, and 21st wards (the Midtown area), where the Draft Riots had concentrated, there was a huge loss of support for Tammany Hall, likely due to Boole's simpathy for the Union and support of Black suffrage.

In the aftermath, Boole soon lost favor with the public and was legislated out of office. Reportedly after that he then became insane and ill-minded, being transferred to the Bloomingdale Insane Asylum, then the Lunatic Asylum at Utica, where he would remain until his death in September 1869.
