= Jacob Westervelt (sheriff) =

Sheriff of New York County, 1831-1834

Jacob Westervelt (July 27, 1794 – May 10, 1881) was the Sheriff of New York County from 1831 to 1834. He was president of Lafayette Bank of New York City.

== Biography ==
He was born on July 27, 1794, in Schraalenburgh, New Jersey, to William Westervelt.

He married Elizabeth Westervelt, the sister of John Jacob V.B. Westervelt, in Schraalenburgh, New Jersey, on March 21, 1812. He moved to New York City (880, Pacific street) immediately after his marriage. In the 1840s he purchased a farm in Upper Nyack, New York, which was subsequently sold. Jacob Westervelt and his wife had nine daughters and two sons: Isabella, Eliza, Margaret, James M., William, Maria, Gertrude, Rachel, Lavinia, Sarah Jane and Caroline Westervelt.

He was active in the grocery trade before he was elected Sheriff of New York County, an office he held from 1831 to 1834. After retiring from the Shrievalty, he became the president of Lafayette Bank of New York City for a short time. In his younger years he took an active part in the politics of the day, becoming a member of the Tammany Society. During the years 1837 and 1838 he was Assistant Alderman of the 9th Ward. For a certain period he was connected with the New York Custom House, and later became a City Weigher. While a resident of Brooklyn he was on the staff of the Department of City Works in that municipality, but during his latter days he retired from general business.

He died on May 10, 1881, in Brooklyn, New York.

== Other Jacob Westervelts ==
Jacob Westervelt (1794–1881) is often confused with his brother-in-law John Jacob V.B. Westervelt (1805–1866), who was a Deputy Sheriff under him, and subsequently High Sheriff of New York City himself too (1846–1849), as well as Assistant Alderman from the 16th Ward (1844–1846). Another namesake is Jacob Aaron Westervelt (1800–1879), the shipbuilder, Alderman from the 13th Ward and later Mayor of New York City (1853–1855).

A Sheriff, Jacob Westervelt was involved in the New York City Police Riot of 1857, known then as the Great Police Riot. It was a conflict which occurred between the New York Municipal and Metropolitan Police on June 16, 1857. Arising over Mayor Fernando Wood's appointment of Charles Devlin over Daniel Conover for the position of city street commissioner, amid rumors that Devlin purchased the office for $50,000 from Wood himself, Municipal police battled Metropolitan officers attempting to arrest Mayor Wood. During the battle, Conover and his attorney visited Sheriff Jacob Westervelt to request that he serve the warrants. Westervelt was advised by his own representatives, who agreed that it was his legal responsibility to do so. He left with the two men for City Hall. Upon his arrival, Wood again refused to leave his office.

Jay Westervelt (Jacob James Westervelt), a contemporary 21st century New York biologist/professional snowboarder, is a namesake descendant of Jacob Westervelt.
