= New normal =

Settled state following a crisis

A new normal is a state to which an economy, society, etc. settles following a crisis, when this differs from the situation that prevailed prior to the start of the crisis (the "old normal"). The term has been employed retroactively in relation to World War I, World War II, the September 11 attacks, the Great Recession, the COVID-19 pandemic and other events.

== Usage history ==
=== World War I ===
In 1918, Henry A. Wise Wood posted a dilemma,

To consider the problems before us we must divide our epoch into three periods, that of war, that of transition, that of the new normal, which undoubtedly will supersede the old. The questions before us, therefore, are, broadly, two: How shall we pass from war to the new normal with the least jar, in the shortest time? In what respect should the new normal be shaped to differ from the old?

=== Dot-com bubble ===
The phrase was extensively used by Roger McNamee in his 2003 interview to Fast Company while describing the new normal in technology development in regards to business and finance after the dot-com bubble bust,

Forget about the Next Big Thing, the next thing has started. It’s called the New Normal, and 2003 will be the first full year of it. The New Normal isn’t where you wait for the next boom. It’s about the rest of your life. ... There was so much urgency that every standard — for due diligence, leadership, recruiting, and investment — was relaxed. The New Normal is about real life — and real time. Getting things right the first time is more important than getting things done quickly.

=== 2005 avian influenza ===
The phrase was used in 2005 by Peter M. Sandman and Jody Lanard in relation to methods of manipulation of attitudes of the public towards avian influenza. They explained that the initial, typically temporary, fearfulness of a novel risk such as a flu pandemic is something to be guided, that this initial period is a "teachable moment" and offers the opportunity of establishing a "new normal".

=== 2008 financial crisis ===
The phrase was used in the context of cautioning the belief of economists and policy makers that industrial economies would revert to their most recent means after the 2008 financial crisis.

The 29 January 2009 edition of the Philadelphia City Paper quoted Paul Glover referring to the need for "new normals" in community development, when introducing his cover story "Prepare for the Best".

The 2010 Per Jacobsson lecture delivered by Mohamed A. El-Erian at the International Monetary Fund, was titled "Navigating the New Normal in Industrial Countries". In the lecture El-Erian stated that "Our use of the term was an attempt to move the discussion beyond the notion that the crisis was a mere flesh wound...instead the crisis cut to the bone. It was the inevitable result of an extraordinary, multiyear period which was anything but normal". El-Erian's lecture cites a 18 May 2008 Bloomberg News article written by journalists Rich Miller and Matthew Benjamin for first using the term: "Post-Subprime Economy Means Subpar Growth as New Normal in U.S."

The phrase has subsequently been used by ABC News, BBC News, the New York Times, and formed part of a question by Candy Crowley, the moderator of the Second U.S. presidential debate of 2012.

=== 2012 China's economic slowdown ===
Since 2012, China's economy has shown a marked slowdown, with growth rates declining from double digit levels (before the 2008 financial crisis) to around 7% in 2014. In 2014, a statement by Xi Jinping, General Secretary of the Chinese Communist Party, indicated that China was entering a 'new normal' (Chinese: 新常态). This term was subsequently popularised by the press and came to refer to expectations of 7% growth rates in China for the foreseeable future. It was indicative of the Chinese government's anticipation of moderate but perhaps more stable economic growth in the medium-to-long term.

=== COVID-19 pandemic ===
During the earlier parts of the COVID-19 pandemic, the term new normal was used to refer to changes in human behavior during the pandemic or speculated changes after the pandemic.

In May 2020, physicians at the University of Kansas Health System predicted that daily life for most people would change during the pandemic after the lifting of lockdowns. This would include limiting person-to-person contact, like handshakes and hugs, as well as maintaining distance from others, known as social distancing. They predicted things would change again after vaccines became available.

In Europe, the term "new normal", first conceptualized in 2018 by Austrian philosopher and political scholar Paul Sailer-Wlasits, has become a popular buzzword in contemporary politics. Initially introduced in the German-speaking world, Paul Sailer-Wlasits associated the term with various phenomena, including political populism and the 45th U.S. administration under Donald Trump, which he critically dubbed the "new global normal". Since then, the phrase has gained traction among politicians in Austria, Germany, and Spain.

In Austria, Chancellor Sebastian Kurz incorporated the term into his rhetoric typically based on a few catchy buzzwords from mid-April 2020, establishing it as a new political buzzword. The Austrian media reacted critically to this, questioning whether this was intended to convey a permanent erosion of civil liberties.

== Criticism ==
Some commentators objected of overuse and misuse of the phrase by the media while describing atypical situations or behaviors, which turned it into a cliché. Sociological research has also shown this terminology does not adequately capture societal shifts that occur during times of major disruption, such as the COVID-19 pandemic.

== In popular culture ==
- Robert A. Heinlein used the phrase in his 1966 novel The Moon Is a Harsh Mistress, with a character telling lunar colonists:
  Citizens, requests may reach you through your comrade neighbors. I hope you will comply willingly; it will speed the day when I can bow out and life can get back to normal — a new normal, free of the Authority, free of guards, free of troops stationed on us, free of passports and searches and arbitrary arrests.
- The New Normal is an American sitcom that aired on NBC from September 10, 2012, to April 2, 2013.
- A dramedy produced by Nigerian filmmaker Teniola Olatoni Ojigbede in 2020.
- In Marvel's Spider-Man 2, Mary Jane Watson starts a podcast called “The New Normal”.

== See also ==
- Return to normalcy, also concerned with trying to emerge from abnormal periods
