= Ida Wood =

American socialite and recluse (1838–1932)

- Born: Ellen Walsh; 14 January 1838; Oldham, England
- Died: 12 March 1932 (aged 94); New York City, U.S.
- Other name: Ida Ellen Mayfield Wood
- Occupation: Socialite
- Spouse: Benjamin Wood (m. 1867; died 1900)

Ida Mayfield Wood (born Ellen Walsh; 14 January 1838 – 12 March 1932) was a British-American socialite who was the third wife of politician and newspaper publisher Benjamin Wood. She is best known for spending the majority of her later life as a recluse in a New York City hotel suite with her two sisters.

== Biography ==
Wood was born Ellen Walsh in Oldham, in the historic county of Lancashire, on January 14, 1838, the daughter of Ann Crawford and Thomas Walsh. Her father, an Irish peddler who emigrated to the U.S. and settled in Massachusetts, died in San Francisco in 1864. Wood later changed her name to Ida E. Mayfield, claiming her father was Louisiana sugar planter Henry Mayfield, and moved to New York City in 1857 at the age of 19.

She made plans to marry 37-year-old Benjamin Wood, a married politician and businessman who co-owned the New York Daily News (not the current newspaper of that name). She boldly propositioned him in a letter on May 28, 1857 and soon became his mistress. After Wood's second wife died, they married in 1867 when she was 29.

Benjamin was a three-time member of Congress and two-time member of the New York State Senate. As his wife, Ida Wood gained entry into New York high society; in 1860, she met Abraham Lincoln and danced with the Prince of Wales and future King of the United Kingdom Edward VII. Her brother-in-law was Fernando Wood, twice mayor of New York City and, like his brother, a three-time member of Congress.

Benjamin was a gambler, once even wagering the Daily News in a card game which he won. Ida, on the other hand, was very careful with money. She convinced her husband to split all of his winnings with her, while he was responsible for his losses. By the time he died in 1900, she had already acquired essentially all of his wealth this way. Wood herself edited and published the newspaper for a time, but sold it in 1901 for a sum between $250,000 and $300,000 (equivalent to between $9.7 million and $11.6 million in 2025).

In 1907, Wood closed her bank account, taking out nearly $1 million (equivalent to $24.5 million in 2024). She then took a two-room suite at the Herald Square Hotel, 19 W. 31st Street, rooms 551-552, where she joined her sister Mary E. Mayfield and her supposed daughter Emma (1857–1928; eventually revealed to be another sister) in becoming recluses. They had little contact with anyone, even hotel employees, for decades. Maids were not permitted inside to clean the rooms. Emma died in a hospital at the age of 71. When Mary became very ill on May 5, 1931, Wood was finally forced to summon help. This intrusion turned out badly for Wood, as Mary died and people became aware of the squalor in which Wood lived. They also discovered how rich she was. In the midst of the Great Depression, Wood's relatives and their lawyers battled to gain control of her wealth. She was declared incompetent in September 1931 and moved one floor down to two other rooms despite her objections. Hundreds of thousands of dollars in cash and other valuables were found in her suite and in trunks stored in the hotel basement. More than $3,000 (equivalent to $64,000 in 2025) a month was spent on her care and protection.

Wood died of bronchial pneumonia at the age of 94 on March 12, 1932, and 1,103 claimants then squabbled over her estate. Neither the Woods nor Mayfields who came forward to claim her fortune received any of it. Her estate was finally split between 10 authenticated relatives in England, Ireland, and the U.S. The truth about her past emerged six months after her death, as told by lawyer Edward T. Corcoran and later confirmed by New York Public Administrator counsel Joseph A. Cox.
