= 1857 New York City mayoral election =

- December 1, 1857
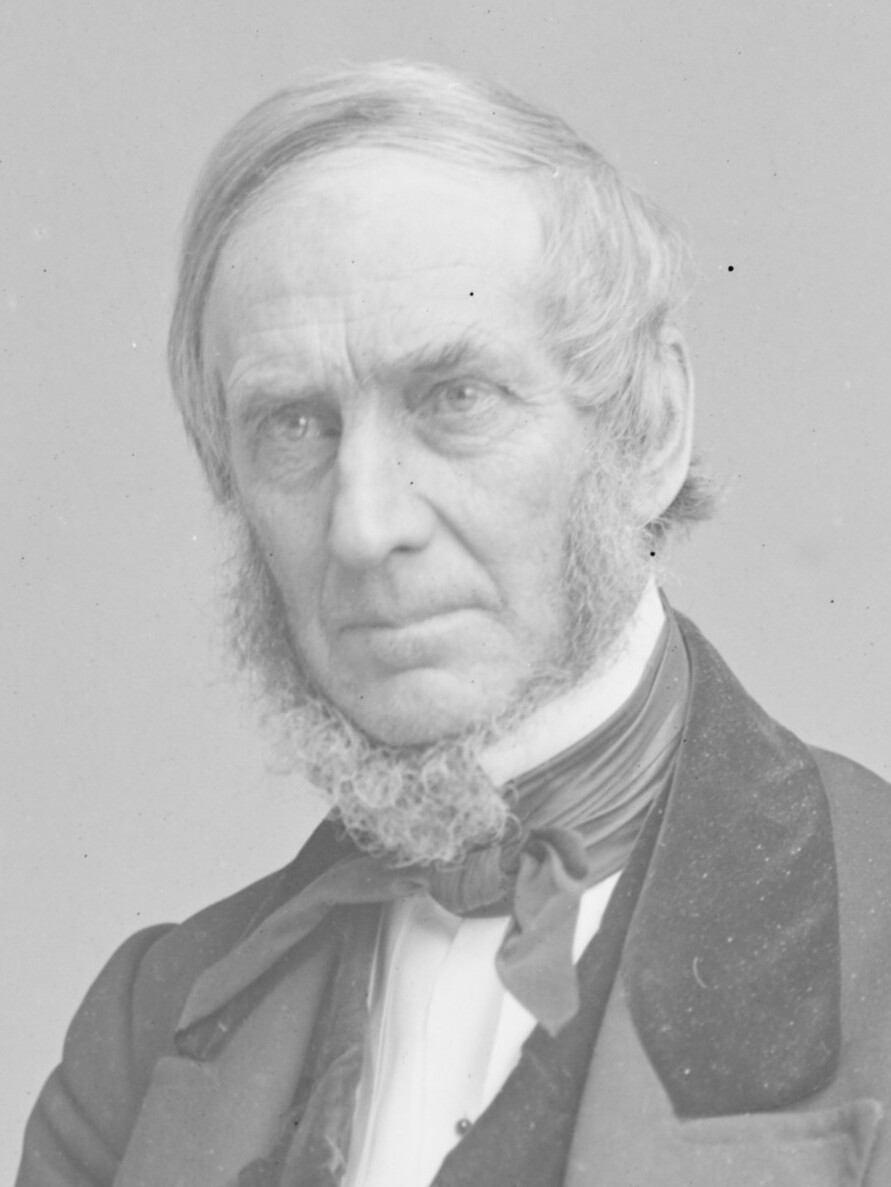

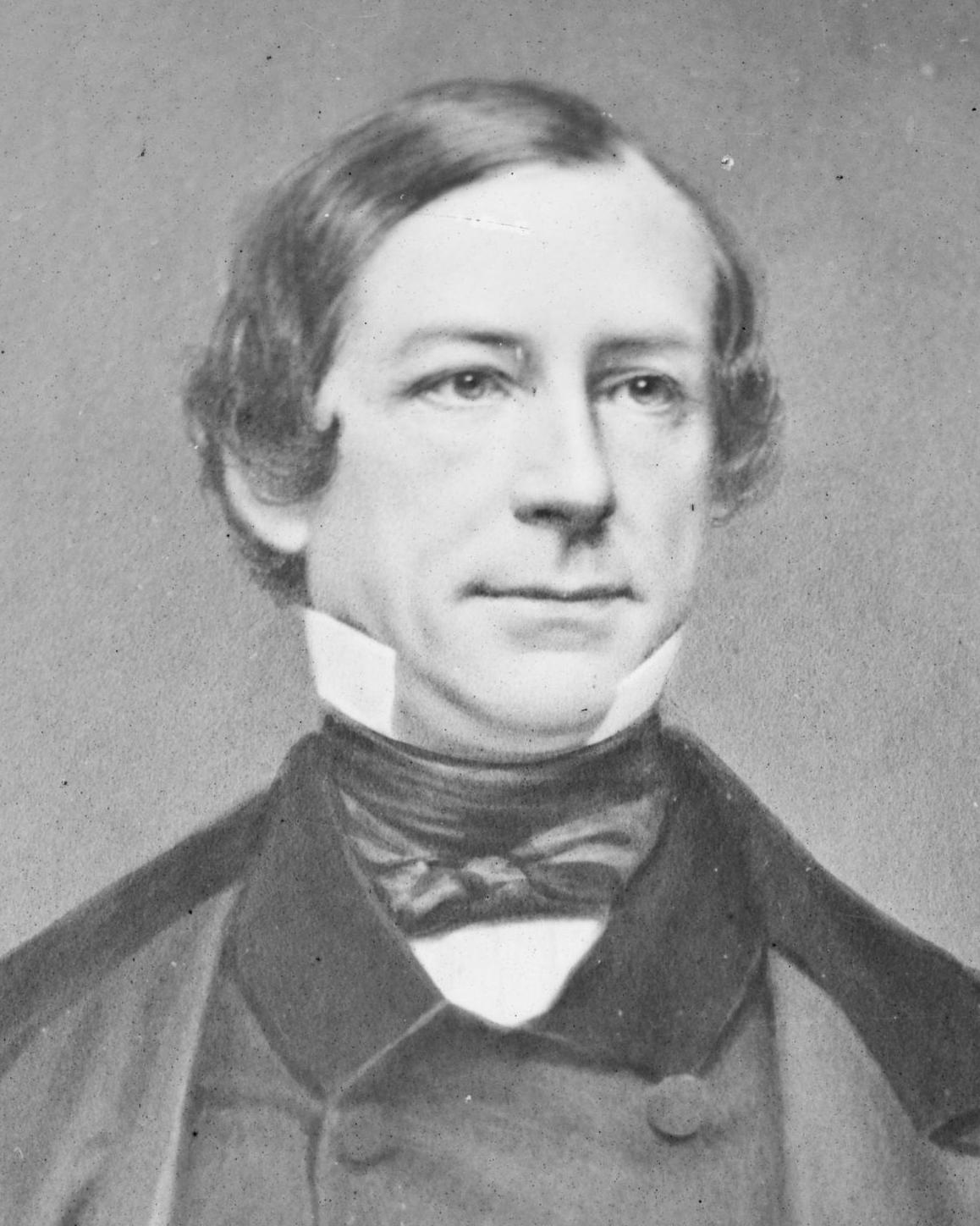
Nominee	Daniel F. Tiemann	Fernando Wood
Party	People's	Democratic
Alliance	Parties: Republican; Know Nothing; Tammany Hall
Popular vote	43,216	40,889
Percentage	51.4%	48.6%
Mayor before election
Fernando Wood
Democratic
Elected mayor
Daniel F. Tiemann
People's

An election for Mayor of New York City was held on December 1, 1857.

Fernando Wood ran for re-election to a third term in office. His second term in office had marked by conflict with the Republican state legislature and the leadership of Tammany Hall. As a result, the state legislature voted to revise the city charter to shorten his current term to one year and hold an election for a new two-year term. Opponents of Wood, including Republicans, Know-Nothings, reformist Democrats and former Free Soil Democrats united behind Daniel F. Tiemann, who won a majority of the vote to unseat Wood.

The campaign was framed by Wood's conflict with the legislature over the new charter, as well as the legislature's dissolution of the municipal police, which had been controlled by Wood, and establishment of a new metropolitan police force. Wood orchestrated his own arrest on June 16, heightening the conflict between his "Municipals" and the state-backed "Metropolitans". After the New York Court of Appeals ruled in favor of the Metropolitans, Wood supporters instead turned to street violence, touching off the Dead Rabbits riot in July.

== Background ==
During his first term in office, Wood sought to strengthen the power of the mayoralty and sought conflict with the state government in Albany. Using a populist approach, he instituted public health reforms and took a moderate or selective approach on prosecuting vice. In his second term, the legislature struck back, reforming the municipal charter of New York City to limit his power and dissolving the municipal police force, through which Wood intimidated and silenced political opposition.

=== Municipal Charter of 1857 ===
While Wood was focused on intra-party politics, the Republican legislature at Albany had begun efforts to destroy his mayoralty. Wood attempted to strike preemptively by sending the legislature a proposed charter revision, with Common Council support, that gave the mayor true executive power, including the right to appoint a cabinet subject to the consent of the council and for-cause removal by the mayor. Most Council prerogatives would be ceded to the mayor and the council would be reduced in numbers and elected on a staggered basis. The proposal was rejected, and the legislature conducted hearings into Wood's control of the police department.

On April 15, the legislature presented Governor John Alsop King with a series of reform bills, including the Municipal Charter of 1857. The new charter consolidated five independent agencies into three executive departments (Street, City Inspector, and Croton Aqueduct), each headed by a mayoral appointee with aldermanic approval. Similar appointment methods were mandated for ten mayoral clerks, the city chamberlain, two health commissioners, the superintendent, and the Harlem Bridge keeper. However, the Charter specified that none of the new powers would be granted until the current term ended and Wood's appointment powers would be suspended until the end of his term, and the new Charter provided for popular election of many key city administrators, removing them from the mayor's political control. Separately, the legislature established unprecedented state commissions, appointed by the governor, to oversee the Harlem Bridge, construction of Central Park and a new city hall, and oversight of harbor pilots, wharves, and piers. Most importantly, the legislature ordered a new mayoral election for a new two-year term, truncating Wood's term to one year and separating mayoral elections from state and national elections, a practice which denied Wood (or any other Democrat) coattails effects from the Democratic president nominees who routinely carried the city.

=== Metropolitan Police Act and police riots ===
Also on April 15, the state legislature passed the Metropolitan Police Act, dissolving Wood's existing police force and replacing it with a metropolitan unit for New York, Richmond, Queens, and Kings Counties. The new unit was overseen by a five-man board appointed by the state, three members of which came from New York County. Governor King appointed no Democratic commissioners. The Metropolitan Police Act set the ground for the eventual 1898 consolidation of modern New York City and effectively ended any prospects for home rule for Manhattan, giving the state direct power over law and order within the city and tying that authority to the wants and needs of the neighboring counties.

Determined to fight back, Wood staked his ground on defiance of the Police Act. He informed U.S. Attorney Thomas Sedgwick of his intent to take "offensive action" and sponsored a Council resolution declaring it unconstitutional and appropriating $10,000 for a legal challenge. While the challenge was pending, two rival police forces, Wood's Municipals and the state Metropolitans, roamed the streets. Officers were forced to choose sides, afraid they would be eventually fired if the took the losing side.

The temporary suspension of appointment powers under the 1857 charter became an issue in June, when Street Commissioner Joseph S. Taylor's death created a vacancy. Wood and Governor King both appointed competing men to the role. On June 16, King's appointee arrived at city hall to take office, and Wood had municipal police physically remove him. He returned with writs and warrants backed by the Metropolitans calling for Wood's arrest. When the Metropolitans attempted to serve Wood, his Municipals created a protective shield around the building and unruly crowds harassed them. Amid cries of "Fernandy Wood" and "Down with the Black Republicans!", the Metropolitans were subject to clubbings and street skirmishes. Recorder James Smith called in the Seventh Regiment of the New York Militia, at which time Wood orchestrated his own arrest by the sheriff for contempt of court. His case was then dismissed by Judge Murray Hoffman on the grounds that Wood was a "law-abiding and order-loving citizen."

On July 2, the New York Court of Appeals ordered the Municipals to desist in a majority opinion written by Chief Justice Hiram Denio. Wood accepted the judgment and took his seat on the Metropolitan Board, leading some Municipals to sue him for lost wages. The city descended into anarchy, with the Wood-aligned gang Dead Rabbits touching off a riot against the Metropolitans and Bowery Boys that caused extensive property damage, though no deaths.

== Democratic nomination ==
=== Background ===
Following his failed bid for governor and his re-election as mayor in 1856, Wood fell from grace with president-elect James Buchanan and lost his grip on the powerful Tammany Hall machine.

Unbeknownst to Wood, Henry Wikoff had informed Buchanan that Wood had been trading on Buchanan's favor. Despite three trips to Washington in five months and an unsuccessful visit to Buchanan's home in Lancaster, Pennsylvania, his preferred choice for Collector of the Port of New York was passed over for Augustus Schell, a critic of Wood. Wood's only ally among the federal appointments was Thomas Sedgwick as U.S. Attorney.

After his re-election, Wood had nearly dictatorial control of the regular Democratic organization but faced organized opposition within the Tammany Society itself. While Wood was away from the city lobbying the administration, his opponents in Tammany filled the society with anti-Wood appointees and officers. Opposition to Wood came from a broad spectrum of the party and included his former ally Daniel Sickles, future Tammany boss William M. Tweed, and future reformist governor Samuel J. Tilden. When Wood attempted to install a successor as Grand Sachem of the Tammany Society, a majority of the council authorized an investigation into his tactics. A second General Committee was formed and Wood's committee was barred from the Tammany building. Wood responded by bribing the building's lessee to allow him to hold meetings. The council of Sachems now dissolved both committees and called for a new election based on a new "district association" system, instead of the traditional ward primary. When Wood sponsored a ticket to oust the existing sachems, his forces were locked out of the reorganization meeting. A new General Committee under Edward Cooper was organized.

=== Candidates ===
- Charles Godfrey Gunther, fur merchant
- Fernando Wood, incumbent mayor since 1855

=== Campaign ===
Wood's campaign for re-nomination was buoyed by Buchanan, who demanded that the city Democrats unify ahead of the 1857 elections. A single nominating convention was held, with Wood's delegation winning a credentials contest in order to split the delegation. Wood personally wrote the platform, praising immigration, the Dred Scott v. Sanford decision, Buchanan's efforts against "slavery agitation in Kansas," and home rule for the city. The platform criticized prohibition as an invasion of private rights and denounced Republican efforts for equal manhood suffrage for blacks.

=== Results ===
Wood won re-nomination for a fourth consecutive election with 95 of 106 votes on the first ballot against Charles Godfrey Gunther.

== General election ==
=== Candidates ===
- Daniel F. Tiemann, paint industrialist and Cooper Union trustee (People's)
- Fernando Wood, incumbent mayor since 1855 (Democratic)

==== Declined ====
- William Frederick Havemayer, former mayor

=== Campaign ===
Wood maintained party unity through the general election, but his campaign was complicated by the Panic of 1857, which sent economic gridlock through the city. In early October, unemployment was estimated at 30,000, increasing at a rate of 1,000 per day. Wood departed from his traditional economic liberalism to avoid class conflict, proposing massive public works programs to feed and fund the poor.

In the November state elections, Democrats won a sweeping victory. It proved a double-edged sword for Wood, satisfying Buchanan and freeing Tammany critics to abandon the Democratic ticket in the December municipal campaign. On November 15, Tammany Hall held a fusion meeting with Republicans and Know-Nothings, which resulted in a non-partisan ten-man nominating committee composed of commercial leaders. Among those supporting the ticket were Democrats August Belmont, John A. Dix, William Frederick Havemeyer, and John Van Buren and reformer Peter Cooper. After failing to recruit Havemeyer, the committee nominated Democrat Daniel F. Tiemann on a "People's Party" ticket.

Wood ran his campaign as a partisan Democrat, challenging Tiemann as a covert Republican and Know-Nothing.

=== Results ===
Amid record turnout, Tiemann defeated Wood by 2,317 votes, 51.4% to 48.6%. Wood's support among immigrants and ethnics, particularly Germans, decreased marginally. Tiemann carried all six West Side wards by a substantial majority of 65.6%.

1857 New York City mayoral election
Party	Candidate	Votes	%
People's	Daniel F. Tiemann	43,216	51.38%
Democratic	Fernando Wood (incumbent)	40,889	48.62%
Total votes		84,105	100.00%

=== Results by ward ===
Results by ward
Ward	Tiemann People's		Wood Democratic		Total
Ward	Votes	%	Votes	%	Votes
1	547	30.01%	1,276	69.99%	1,823
2	438	65.47%	231	34.53%	669
3	464	53.39%	405	46.61%	869
4	525	19.91%	2,112	80.09%	2,637
5	1,713	55.94%	1,349	44.06%	3,062
6	495	17.09%	2,401	82.91%	2,896
7	2,250	49.21%	2,322	50.79%	4,572
8	2,555	57.73%	1,871	42.27%	4,426
9	4,618	72.02%	1,794	27.98%	6,412
10	1,773	52.15%	1,627	47.85%	3,400
11	2,244	40.70%	3,269	59.30%	5,513
12	1,179	57.07%	887	42.93%	2,066
13	1,679	48.26%	1,800	51.74%	3,479
14	922	28.12%	2,357	71.88%	3,279
15	2,929	76.84%	883	23.16%	3,812
16	3,409	61.56%	2,129	38.44%	5,538
17	3,199	45.94%	3,765	54.06%	6,964
18	3,312	57.42%	2,456	42.58%	5,768
19	1,202	47.60%	1,323	52.40%	2,525
20	3,389	54.46%	2,834	45.54%	6,223
21	2,633	59.83%	1,768	40.17%	4,401
22	1,741	46.18%	2,029	53.82%	3,770
Totals	43,216	51.38%	40,888	48.62%	84,104
