= Jacob Westervelt =

Jacob Westervelt may refer to:

- Jacob Aaron Westervelt (1800–1879), shipbuilder and New York City Mayor
- Jacob Westervelt (sheriff) (1794–1881), High Sheriff of New York City and Assistant Alderman
- Jacob A. Westervelt (pilot boat), 19th-century New York pilot boat
