= Charles Devlin =

American contractor and civil servant (1805–1881)

- Born: c. 1805; Ireland
- Died: February 1, 1881 (aged 76); Manhattan, New York, United States
- Resting place: Calvery Cemetery
- Occupations: Contractor, bondsman and civil servant
- Known for: Prominent New York contractor and bondsman during the mid-to late 19th century; involved in a dispute with Daniel D. Conover over the position of NYC street commissioner resulting in the Police Riot of 1857.
- Political party: Democrat
- Children: 5

Charles Devlin (c. 1805 – February 1, 1881) was an American contractor, bondsman and civil servant. He was the largest and one of the most successful city works contractors in New York City during the mid to late 19th century and was the bondsman of several prominent New Yorkers, including Boss Tweed and Henry W. Genet. His controversial appointment as city street commissioner over Daniel D. Conover resulted in the Police Riot of 1857.

== Biography ==
Charles Devlin was born in Ireland and migrated to the United States at age 27. Shortly after his arrival in New York City, he worked as a journeyman baker in Frankfort Street and later started a successful bakery in the same area. During the 1840s, he contained contracts on the Hudson River Railroad and spent two years building several sections of railway track. It was after this enterprise that he became employed by the city as a contractor for the City Works department. He received several major contracts for Central Park, however the majority of his work concerned grading, paving, and general street improvements.

Devlin took a brief foray into local politics, running against Robert McGinnis for a seat on the Board of Aldermen. His appointment by Mayor Fernando Wood as city street commissioner over Daniel D. Conover, who had been originally appointed by Governor John King, caused considerable controversy. Claims were made that Devlin had purchased the position from Wood for $50,000, and when Conover was thrown out of New York City Hall, attempts to serve two warrants for Wood's arrest resulted in the Police Riot of 1857.

Devlin amassed a large personal fortune through this business and, at his height, was believed to be the largest contractor engaged in city works. He also became a noted bondsman, providing bail for such figures as Boss Tweed and Henry W. Genet, the latter bringing him to national attention during his criminal trial in 1872–73. He lost most of his wealth endorsing notes for many of his friends and declared bankruptcy in 1879. Devlin died from pneumonia at his East Fifty-Seventh Street home on the afternoon of February 1, 1881, and was buried in the family vault at Calvary Cemetery. He was survived by his wife, three daughters and two sons; his daughter Isabella was the wife of lawyer Henry A. Brann, and Fanny was married to industrialist and real estate mogul William F. Croft. Devlin left an estate consisting of 75 city lots.
