= Francis A. Thomas =

American politician (1826–1899)

Francis A. Thomas (1826 – September 28, 1899) was a prominent physician and Republican politician in New York City's 19th ward.

Born in Lewis County, New York, Thomas graduated from the Columbia College of Physicians and Surgeons in 1853. In 1854, he was appointed as house physician for Blackwell's Island, serving for one year.

Thomas was a prominent Republican, helping to found the Sons of Freedom during the Civil War. The Sons of Freedom later merged into the Union League Club.

Elected in 1865, Thomas served as a councilman from the Seventh District from 1866 to 1867. In 1868, Thomas ran on the Republican ticket for the United States House of Representatives against Democrat Fernando Wood, losing in a close and bitterly contested election.^{a} He subsequently was made Police Surgeon, and held that office for ten years.

On September 26, 1899, Thomas was struck by a Lexington Avenue cable car while crossing 85th Street near his home and died two days later at Presbyterian Hospital.

== Notes ==
- ^aHowever, in "Fernando Wood: A Political Biography", Jerome Mushkat characterizes Thomas as a "token candidate", which seems to be borne out by Wood winning with 57.6% of the vote to Thomas's 35.7%.
