= Isaac Vanderbeck Fowler =

American politician

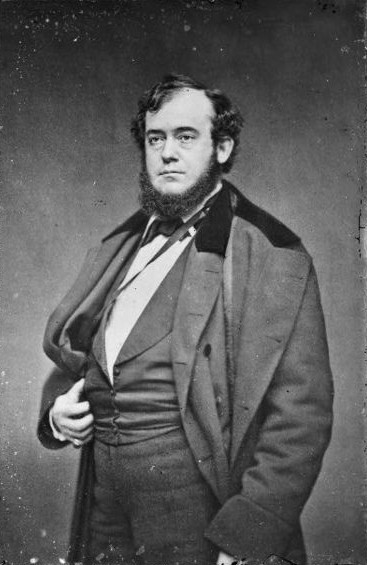
- Isaac Fowler

Postmaster of New York City
- In office April 1, 1853 – May 10, 1860
- Appointed by: Franklin Pierce

Personal details
- Born: August 20, 1818
- Died: September 29, 1869 (aged 51) Chicago, Illinois, USA
- Party: Democratic Party

Isaac Vanderbeck Fowler (August 20, 1818 – September 29, 1869) was an American politician. He was thrice the Grand Sachem of the Tammany Society, better known as Tammany Hall, from 1848 to 1850, 1857–1858, and 1858–1859, the last term shared with William M. "Boss" Tweed. He was appointed Postmaster of New York City by President Franklin Pierce on April 1, 1853, and was also a delegate from New York to the 1860 Democratic National Convention.

== Biography ==
Fowler was an unusual leader of the Tammany Society as he was a college graduate. He also moved in the better social circles, and convinced a number of rich young men to join the organization.

Fowler had long lived beyond his means, and on May 10, 1860, was removed from his office as Postmaster and a warrant was issued for his arrest, accusing him of embezzling $155,554. Fowler, who had also produced the $2,500 to buy off the Republican Peter P. Voorhis on city's Board of Supervisors, was staying at a hotel when the warrant for his arrest was issued. The responsibility for Fowler's arrest was given to Isaiah Rynders, another Tammany operative who was serving as a United States marshal at the time. Rynders made enough ruckus upon entering the hotel where Fowler was staying that Fowler was able to escape to Mexico.

Fowler eluded capture and traveled to Mexico and Cuba. On July 5, 1866, the District Attorney filed a nolle prosequi, saying that he no longer intended to prosecute Fowler for his misdeeds. Some time after that, Fowler returned to the United States.

Fowler died on September 29, 1869, in Chicago, Illinois, and was at the time planning to return to New York City.

Party political offices
Preceded by Robert H. Morris	Grand Sachem of Tammany Hall; 1848-1850	Succeeded by Fernando Wood
Preceded by Fernando Wood	Grand Sachem of Tammany Hall; 1857-1858	Succeeded by Fernando Wood
Preceded by Fernando Wood	Grand Sachem of Tammany Hall (with William M. Tweed); 1858-1859	Succeeded by William M. Tweed and Richard B. Connolly
