= Henry A. Wise Wood =

American inventor

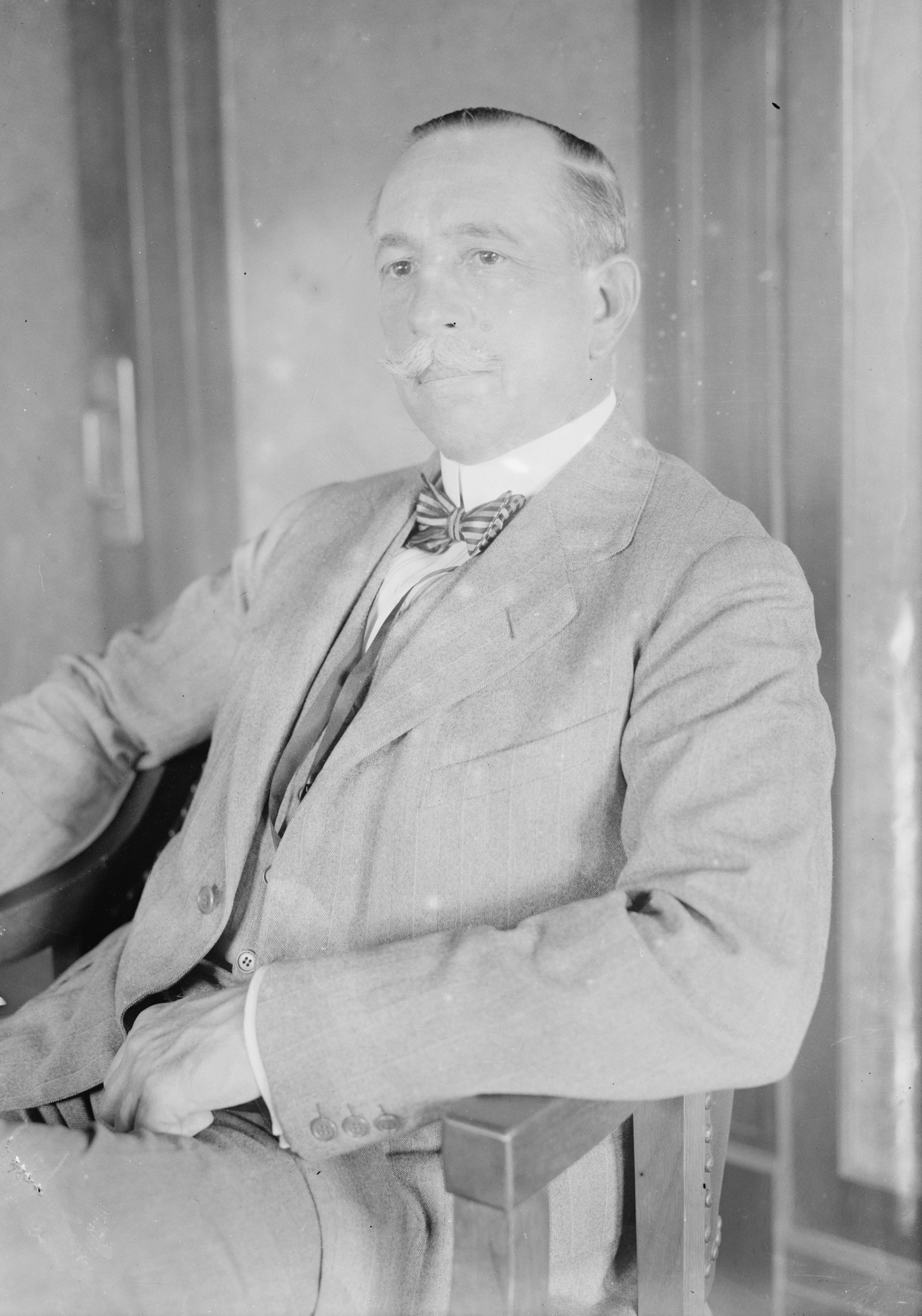
Henry Alexander Wise Wood circa 1915

Henry Alexander Wise Wood (March 1, 1866 – April 9, 1939) was an American inventor of a high-speed newspaper press and member of the Naval Consulting Board. His father Fernando Wood was mayor of New York City and a Democratic Party member of Congress, and his uncle Benjamin Wood was also a Democratic member of Congress. He married Elizabeth Ogden. In 1915 he joined the Naval Consulting Board. He died on April 9, 1939.
