= Daniel Conover =

American public servant, political activist, and industrialist

Daniel D. Conover
- Born: 1822; New Jersey, United States
- Died: August 15, 1896 (aged 74); Bay Shore, New York
- Resting place: Oakwood Cemetery
- Occupations: Public servant, political activist and industrialist
- Known for: Industrialist whose land development transformed Long Island into a popular summer vacation spot for New York high society; his appointment as NYC street commissioner was the cause of the Police Riot of 1857.
- Spouse: Catherine Eliza Whitlock
- Children: Augustus W. Conover; Catherine Conover

Daniel Denice Conover (1822 – August 15, 1896) was an American public servant, political activist and industrialist. He was the first to invest in land development in Long Island and, through his efforts, was partly responsible for transforming the southern coastline, then known as the Great South Bay, as a popular summer resort for many prominent New York and Brooklyn families throughout the mid-to late 19th century.

His appointment as street commissioner of New York City by Governor John King in 1857, which was instead turned over to Charles Devlin by Mayor Fernando Wood, resulted in the Police Riot of 1857.

== Biography ==
Born in 1822, Daniel Conover became involved in local New York politics as a young man. He soon became a well-known political activist, being a member of several prominent clubs, and was involved in both municipal and national elections. He was also an outspoken supporter of the New York City Volunteer Fire Department and was closely associated with department for decades. In 1853, he was the foreman of Amity Hose which was reportedly "a company not only noted for its elegant carriage, but for the character and prominence of its members in the community". He was a member of the Common Council and, through his influence, he successfully introduced the resolution to purchase the fire department's first steam engine. He was also a presidential elector for John C. Frémont during the United States presidential election of 1856.

In 1857, he was appointed street commissioner by Governor John King. On the day he was to assume his office however, Conover was informed that Mayor Fernando Wood had instead given the position to Charles Devlin and had Conover thrown out of the building by Municipal police. Conover immediately obtained two arrest warrants for Mayor Wood, one charging him with inciting a riot and another for assault, and returned to New York City Hall with 50 Metropolitan officers. The resulting confrontation between the Municipal and Metropolitan police resulted in the Police Riot of 1857.

Following this incident, Conover became a prominent industrialist especially in New York's growing street railway systems. He was one of the projectors for the Boulevard Line, the granting of a charter for which precipitated a contest in the Board of Aldermen, as well as the Thirty-Fourth Street line. He later became president of the Fulton Street, Wall Street & Cortland Street Ferries Railroad Company and the Twenty-Eighth & Twenty-Ninth Street Railroad Company.

Settling in Bay Ridge, New York during his later years, Conover was responsible for developing real estate in the area surrounding Bay Ridge and Islip, New York. He first visited Bay Ridge in 1856 when the Olympic Club, of which he was a member, relocated there. He began buying up cheap undeveloped property, among these a sizable property on Saxton Avenue where he built a Victorian style cottage for his wife and children, and constructed homes which rented out for $100 to $1,000 a month. These cottages were based along Saxton Avenue, Awixa Avenue and Main Street and, although considered a highly risky investment, the area eventually became popular vacation spot for many prominent New York and Brooklyn families during the mid- to late 19th century.

He also expended his projects to further develop the area and attract affluent residents. Among these included the dredging of nearby creeks allowing the navigation of larger boats. Using a steam shovel, he was able to deepen and widen the channels of Awixa Creek, Champlin’s Creek and Orowoc Creek. The east end of Awixa Creek was cut off, dredged from its mouth northward toward South Country Road, and a freshwater lake was built. A road which would have connected Awixa Avenue to Saxton Avenue over the lake was also planned but never completed. Other changes included the channel of Champlin’s Creek being widened 90 feet while Orowoc Creek was dredged and the surrounding area filled for additional land.

Conover's experience in public transportation aided him in improving roads and highways in Long Island which were described as "of full width, flat surfaces, and composed of clam shells and in equal parts" that would "stand all seasons". While his designs were superior over the existing dirt roads, little was done to improve general road conditions despite complaints from local residents. One of his roads, the South Country Road, was one of the earliest modern public highways in Long Island and eventually became Moffitt Boulevard, located north of the Long Island Rail Road line. Islip in particular benefited greatly from Conover's land development and encouraged others to invest in the area as well. One of Conover's properties, Orowoc Pond, held a fishing expedition in 1899 which hosted former president Grover Cleveland.

Conover remained in Bay Ridge until his death on August 15, 1896, and was buried in Oakwood Cemetery. His historic Saxton Avenue residence was bought from the Conover family by Franklyn and Edna Hutton in 1912, and then by Philip B. Weld in 1921 and finally H. Cecil Sharp in 1929. Sharp purchased additional property surrounding the home during the next few years and, in 1933, the house was removed in order for Sharp to build a new house. The barn and windmill however, remain on the property up to the present day.
