= Benjamin Wood (American politician) =

American politician (1820–1900)

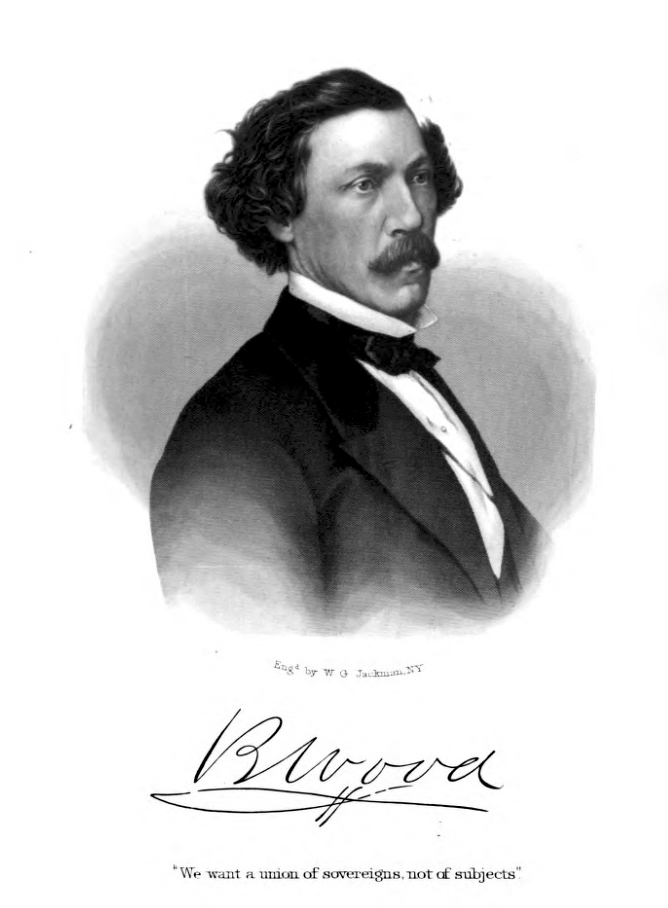
Benjamin Wood, Congressman from New York

Benjamin Wood (October 13, 1820 – February 21, 1900) was an American politician and publishing entrepreneur from the state of New York during the American Civil War.

== Life and career ==
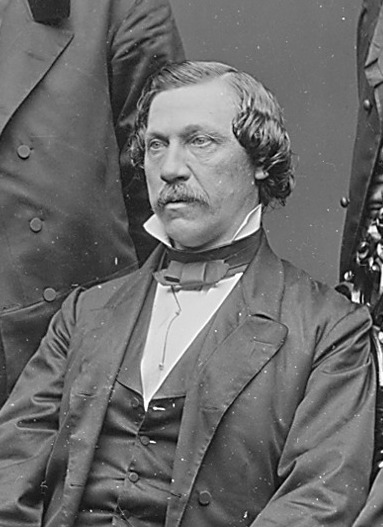
Wood during the Civil War

Wood, the son of Benjamin and Rebecca (Lehman) Wood, was born in Shelbyville, Kentucky, on October 13, 1820, and was the brother of U.S. congressional representative and New York City mayor Fernando Wood. The Wood family moved from Kentucky to New York City, and Benjamin Wood was educated in New York City. He entered the mercantile and shipping business, and in 1860, he purchased the New York Daily News (not to be confused with the current New York Daily News, which was founded in 1919), of which he was the editor and publisher until he died in 1900.

In 1861, the federal government effectively shut down the paper by suspending its delivery via the postal service as being sympathetic with the Confederacy. During the interval, he wrote a novel, Fort Lafayette or, Love and Secession (1862).

Wood was able to re-open the paper 18 months later. In the period from 1863 to 1865 the paper printed personal columns and the War Department alleged that they were used by Confederate spies for coded communications. The managing editor William McKellar was arrested and brought before a congressional investigative committee. After that Benjamin Wood was regarded as a traitor by many northern citizens.

Wood was elected as a Democrat to the 37th and 38th United States Congresses (March 4, 1861 – March 3, 1865) He was a member of the New York State Senate (4th D.) in 1866 and 1867 and elected to the 47th United States Congress (March 4, 1881 – March 3, 1883). He was a presidential elector in 1884.

== Death and personal life ==
Wood died in New York City on February 21, 1900, and was interred at Calvary Cemetery in Queens. It was estimated that he left to his wife, Ida Mayfield Wood, around $2 million.

His wife Ida became a recluse and miser, who resided at New York City's Herald Square Hotel for 24 years, refusing contact with the outside world, and was the subject of a famous court case after her death in 1932, when her true identity of Ellen Walsh came to light.

U.S. House of Representatives
Preceded by Daniel Sickles	Member of the U.S. House of Representatives from New York's 3rd congressional district 1861–1863	Succeeded by Moses F. Odell
Preceded by James Kerrigan	Member of the U.S. House of Representatives from New York's 4th congressional district 1863–1865	Succeeded by Morgan Jones
Preceded by Nicholas Muller	Member of the U.S. House of Representatives from New York's 5th congressional district 1881–1883	Succeeded by Nicholas Muller
New York State Senate
Preceded by Christian B. Woodruff	Member of the New York State Senate from the 4th district 1866–1867	Succeeded by William M. Tweed
