= New York Daily News (19th century) =

Defunct daily newspaper of New York City (1855–1906)

- Type: Daily newspaper
- Publisher: Benjamin Wood (1860–1900)
- Founded: 1855
- Ceased publication: 1906; 120 years ago
- Headquarters: 19 Chatham St., New York City
- OCLC number: 9481787

The New York Daily News was a daily New York City newspaper from 1855 to 1906, unrelated to the present-day Daily News founded in 1919. Founded in 1855, it flourished under the stewardship of Benjamin Wood, becoming one of the highest circulation papers in the United States. It was notable for its racist and pro-Confederate views. The paper faltered after Wood's death in 1900 and folded in December 1906.

== History ==
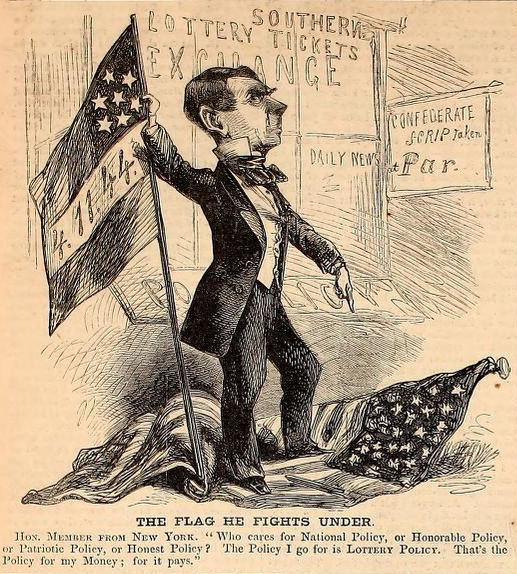
Benjamin Wood portrayed in the August 31, 1861, issue of Harper's Weekly, refusing to fly the American flag at his paper and stomping on it, instead flying a Confederate flag with 4-11-44 on it, slang for the lottery; Wood owned a southern lottery.

The paper was founded by Gideon J. Tucker in 1855, but he edited it only until 1857. Between 1857 and 1860, it was owned by W. Drake Parsons, 102 Nassau Street. Fernando Wood then bought the paper and put in his brother as editor; Benjamin soon after bought the majority interest. The paper reportedly soon became the country's highest-circulation daily paper.

Under Wood, the paper was pro-Southern/Confederate and defended slavery and the right to secede. It supported Stephen A. Douglas in the 1860 presidential election, decrying that if Lincoln won, "we shall find negroes among us thicker than blackberries swarming everywhere," in accord with its plainly racist viewpoint.

After the Confederates fired at Fort Sumter, Wood refused a mob's demand that he fly the American flag at the paper's building.

In August 1861, the U.S. government effectively shut down the paper (by suspending its delivery via the postal service) as being sympathetic with an enemy of the United States (in this case, the Confederacy during the American Civil War). Wood was able to reopen the paper 18 months later, in May 1863.

In the 1870s, it is likely that only three newspapers in the United States had a circulation of over 100,000, all in New York: The Sun, New York Herald, and New York Daily News.

Benjamin Wood continued as editor of the paper until his death in February 1900. Gambling problems caused Wood to declare bankruptcy in 1879, and he sold 43% of his ownership to publisher William L. Brown, who then worked with Wood until Wood's death.

His widow, Ida Mayfield Wood, who later became a famous recluse confining herself to the Herald Square Hotel, briefly ran the paper. She sold it in 1901 to Frank Munsey for about $340,000. Munsey changed the paper from an afternoon to morning publication and tried to broaden its appeal but sold it in 1904 as circulation dropped. Managing editor Thomas C. Quinn took over the reins but was unable to stop the paper's decline, and publication ceased on December 13, 1906.

== German edition ==
Like other New York publishers, Wood created a German-language edition of his paper titled New-Yorker Tages-Nachrichten in 1870 and a Sunday edition titled Sonntags-Nachrichten in 1872.
