= New York City Police riot =

1857 conflict between police forces in front of New York City Hall, New York, USA

Coordinates: 40.712°N 74.006°W

New York City Police riot of 1857
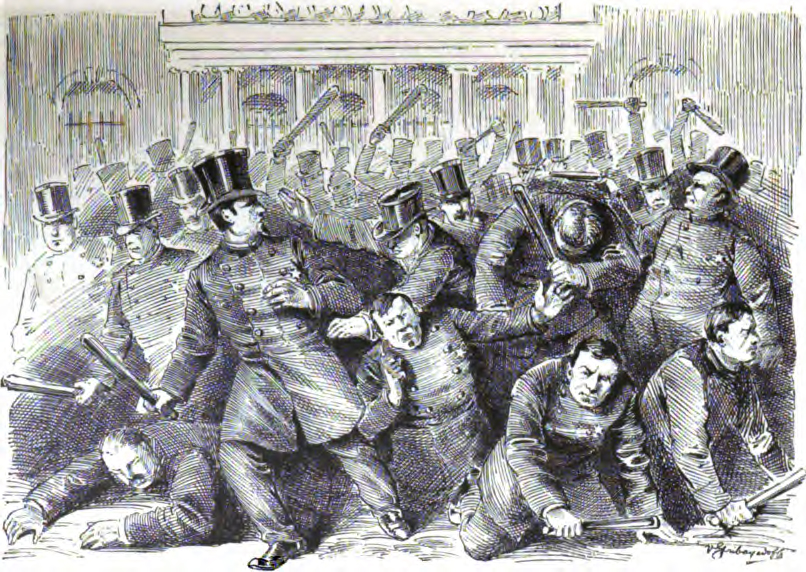
- New York City Municipal and Metropolitan policemen riot and fight each other in front of New York City Hall in 1857
Date	June 16, 1857
Location	New York City, New York, United States
Result	Riot crushed

Casualties and losses
- 53 injured

The New York City Police Riot of 1857, known at the time as the Great Police Riot, was a conflict which occurred in front of New York City Hall between the recently dissolved New York Municipal Police and the newly-formed Metropolitan Police on June 16, 1857. Arising over New York City mayor Fernando Wood's appointment of Charles Devlin over Daniel Conover for the position of city street commissioner, amid rumors that Devlin purchased the office for $50,000 from Wood, Municipal police battled Metropolitan officers attempting to arrest Mayor Wood.

Two arrest warrants had been issued against the mayor following an altercation between him and Conover when arriving at City Hall to assume his office. The situation was resolved only with the intervention of the New York State Militia under Major General Charles W. Sandford.

== Background ==
Massive police corruption, under Mayor Fernando Wood, prompted the New York State Legislature to relieve him of control over the city's police. Several related bills were passed during the spring of 1857; the most important of these abolished the Municipal Police and Police Board that had been formed under an act of 1853. The bill replaced them with a Metropolitan Police District that would fall under the jurisdiction of Manhattan, Brooklyn, Staten Island and the other boroughs of present-day New York City. This new police force was to be controlled by five commissioners appointed by the Governor of New York: Simeon Draper, James Bowen, James W. Nye, Jacob Cholwell and James S. T. Stranahan. The head of the commission was Frederick Augustus Tallmadge, noted reformer and Recorder of New York City during the Astor Place Riots of 1849, who accepted the position of Superintendent of Police after several others had declined.

The new commission ordered Mayor Wood to disband the Municipal police and turn over its property to the Metropolitans. Wood refused, however, even after the State Supreme Court upheld, in May 1857, the law establishing the commission. Wood called upon the Municipals to support him; when this was put to a vote, 15 police captains and 800 patrolmen under Police Superintendent George Washington Matsell chose to support the mayor. The remaining members, among them Captain George W. Walling, chose to comply with the state law and joined the Metropolitans. While the Metropolitans were setting up their new headquarters on White Street, Mayor Wood quickly filled the Municipal positions left vacant.

== Events ==
In June 1857, after the sudden death of Street Commissioner Joseph S. Taylor, Mayor Wood and Governor John King argued over a successor, and Daniel D. Conover was eventually selected. Arriving at New York City Hall to assume the office on June 16, Conover was informed that Mayor Wood had instead appointed Charles Devlin to the position. Wood had Conover forcibly removed from the building by Municipal police officers, and Conover obtained two warrants for the arrest of the mayor. One was for inciting a riot and the other was for "violence against Conover's person". (It was widely speculated afterward that Wood had received $50,000 from Devlin ($1.4m in 2014) to secure the position.)

Captain George Walling of the Metropolitans was assigned to carry out one of the warrants. He arrived at City Hall by himself and was allowed to speak with Mayor Wood in his private office. Learning the purpose of his visit, Wood refused to accompany Walling, who then attempted to take him out of the building by force. Over 300 Municipal officers were stationed at City Hall, and Walling was stopped and thrown out into the street. He attempted several times to re-enter, arguing with Captain Abraham Ackerman, until the arrival of Captains Jacob Sebring and Coroner Perry, leading fifty Metropolitans, to serve the second warrant.

The Municipals charged out of the building, and for over a half-hour, the rival forces fought on the steps and in the corridors of City Hall. The Metropolitans were eventually forced from the building in a disorganized retreat. During the riot, 53 men were injured, including one officer from the Seventeenth Precinct, Patrolman Crofut, whose injuries resulted in his becoming an invalid. The wounded Metropolitans were brought to the office of Recorder James M. Smith and treated, while Mayor Wood and his supporters celebrated their victory in his private office.

During the fight, Conover and his attorney visited Sheriff Jacob Westervelt to request that he serve the warrants. Westervelt was advised by his representatives that it was his legal responsibility to do so, and he left with two men for City Hall. Upon his arrival, Wood again refused to leave his office. Soon after, members of the Metropolitan Police Board met with Major General Charles W. Sandford, who was about to leave with the Seventh Regiment for Boston. Sandford agreed to assist, and he led the regiment to City Hall. His men surrounded the building, and he entered City Hall to confront Mayor Wood. Realizing his situation, Wood agreed to submit and was placed under arrest.

== Aftermath ==
Within an hour of his arrest, Wood was released on bail. He was apparently never brought to trial, as records seem to indicate, and civil courts later supported that the governor had no legal right to interfere in mayoral appointments of city officials. Several months following the riot, policemen who had been injured at City Hall sued Mayor Wood and received $250 each. Wood ignored the ruling, and the officers were later paid, including legal bills, by the city.

Tensions remained high between the Municipal and Metropolitan police, especially during the next several months, and their feud continued throughout the summer. It was a common occurrence for Municipal officers to interfere in arrests by Metropolitan patrolmen. Criminals were often either released by Municipal officers or, when brought to a precinct, let go upon their own recognizance. This rivalry encouraged the criminal underworld to go on a crime spree and was partially responsible for the Dead Rabbits Riot in July 1857. By the fall of 1857, the Court of Appeals ruled in favor of the Supreme Court's decision and Mayor Wood quietly agreed to disband the Municipal police force.

== See also ==
- Boston Police Strike, 1919
- Dead Rabbits Riot of 1857
- History of the New York City Police Department
- List of incidents of civil unrest in New York City
- List of incidents of civil unrest in the United States
- Patrolmen's Benevolent Association Riot, 1992
- Tammany Hall
