= George Opdyke =

American politician (1805–1880)

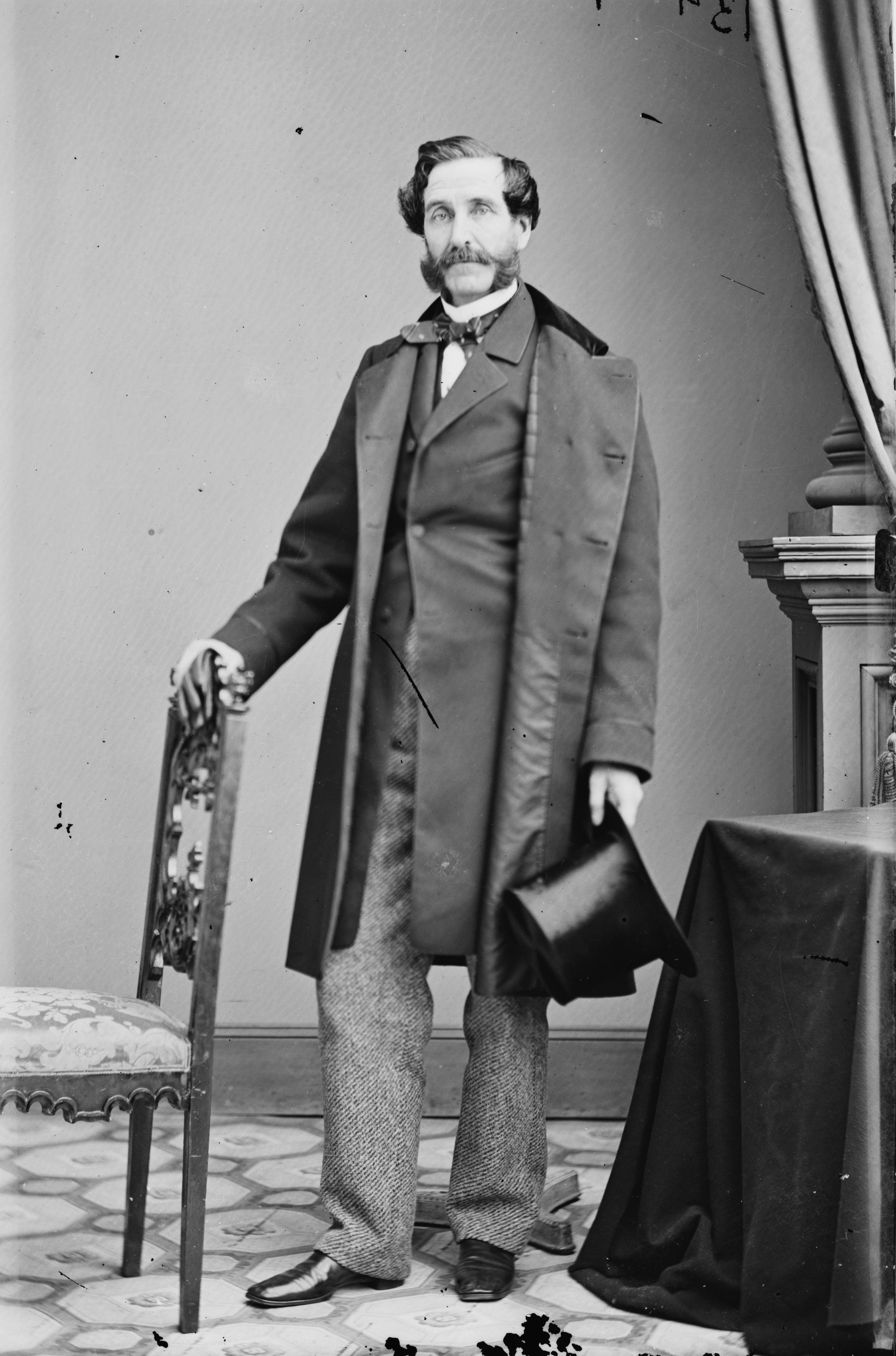
- Opdyke, 1855–1865

77th Mayor of New York City
- In office 1862–1864
- Preceded by: Fernando Wood
- Succeeded by: Charles Godfrey Gunther

Member of the New York State Assembly for New York County, 14th District
- In office 1859
- Preceded by: Dunham J. Crain
- Succeeded by: Theodore B. Voorhees

Personal details
- Born: December 7, 1805 Kingwood Township, New Jersey, U.S.
- Died: June 12, 1880 (aged 74) New York City, U.S.
- Resting place: Mount Pleasant Cemetery
- Party: Republican
- Other political affiliations: Democratic (before 1848); Free Soil (1848–1854)
- Spouse: Elizabeth Hall Stryker
- Children: 5
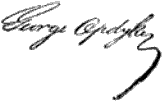
- Signature

George Opdyke (December 7, 1805 – June 12, 1880) was an entrepreneur and the 77th mayor of New York City serving from 1862 to 1864 during the American Civil War. The New York City draft riots occurred during his tenure.

== Early life ==
Opdyke was born on December 7, 1805, in Kingwood Township in Hunterdon County, New Jersey. He was the sixth of nine children born to George Opdyke (1773–1851) and Mary E. (née Stout) Opdyke (1773–1834).

At sixteen years old, after attending the district school when he could and working on the family farm, he became a teacher in one of the neighboring school districts, teaching in Hunterdon County for two years.

== Career ==
During the 1820s, after his two-year stint as a teacher in New Jersey, Opdyke began his business career by traveling West to Cleveland, Ohio, where he opened a successful clothing store. He later transferred his business to New Orleans, Louisiana, staying there until 1832.

After giving up his business in New Orleans, he moved to New York and established himself as an importer of woolen goods. His company eventually became the largest clothing manufacturing and merchandiser in the area. In 1868, he gave up the clothing business and turned to banking, becoming well known and prominent as a banker in New York.

After serving as mayor of New York, he served as the first president of the Fourth National Bank of New York.

=== Political career ===
Until 1848, Opdyke was a Democrat, although he "took no conspicuous part in the affairs of that party." He left the party to become a delegate to the Buffalo Free Soil Party convention in 1848, and served on its committee on resolutions, as well as standing as a candidate for the U.S. Congress on the Free Soil ticket in New Jersey. When the Free Soil party merged with the Republican Party, he joined with it on its anti-slavery platform. In 1856, he was an unsuccessful candidate for the New York State Assembly.

In 1859, he was a member of the New York State Assembly (New York Co., 14th D.), and was a member of the Committee on Banks and chairman of the Committee on Insurance. He was also a delegate to the 1860 Republican National Convention, where he played a role in the nomination of Abraham Lincoln. With John Adams Dix and Richard Milford Blatchford, he formed the Union Defense Committee, empowered by President Abraham Lincoln to spend public money during the initial raising and equipping of the Union Army.

In 1861, he was elected to a two-year term as mayor of New York City over incumbent mayor Fernando Wood of the Mozart Hall faction of the Democracy and William Frederick Havemeyer of the Tammany Hall wing. As mayor, Opdyke recruited and equipped troops for the war and responded to draft riots of July 1863. His term in office ended in 1863, and he was succeeded by Democrat Charles Godfrey Gunther, who had also been Opdyke's opponent in 1861.

== Personal life ==
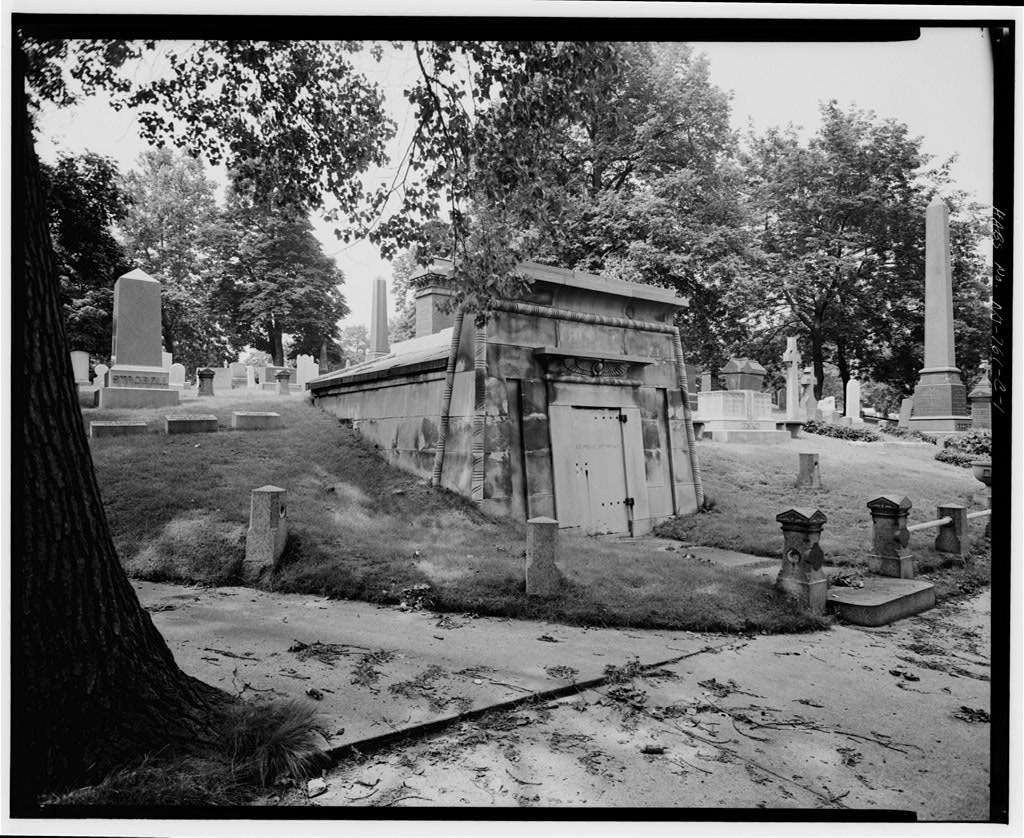
Opdyke's tomb

Opdyke was married to Elizabeth Hall Stryker (1805–1891), a daughter of Peter Stryker and Kezia (née Davis) Stryker. Together, they were the parents of:

- Mary Elizabeth Opdyke (1834–1907), who married George W. Farlee.
- William Stryker Opdyke (1836–1922), who married Margaret Elizabeth Post (1834–1911) in 1863.
- Charles Wilson Opdyke (1838–1907), who married Jane Wandling Creveling (1843–1871).
- Henry Beach Opdyke (1841–1919), who married Marian Blagden Whiton (1848–1903).
- Samuel T. Opdyke (1846–1851), who died young.

Opdyke died at his home, 1 East 47th Street in New York City on June 12, 1880. He was buried in the Mount Pleasant Cemetery in Newark, New Jersey.

=== Descendants ===
Through his daughter Mary, he was a grandfather of Lilian Gray Farlee (1859–1894), who married Dr. Charles Loomis Dana, a physician, professor of nervous and mental disease at Cornell Medical College, in 1882.

New York State Assembly
Preceded by Dunham J. Crain	New York State Assembly; New York County, 14th District; 1859	Succeeded by Theodore B. Voorhees
Political offices
Preceded by Fernando Wood	Mayor of New York City; 1862–1863	Succeeded by Charles Godfrey Gunther
