= Charles Godfrey Gunther =

American politician

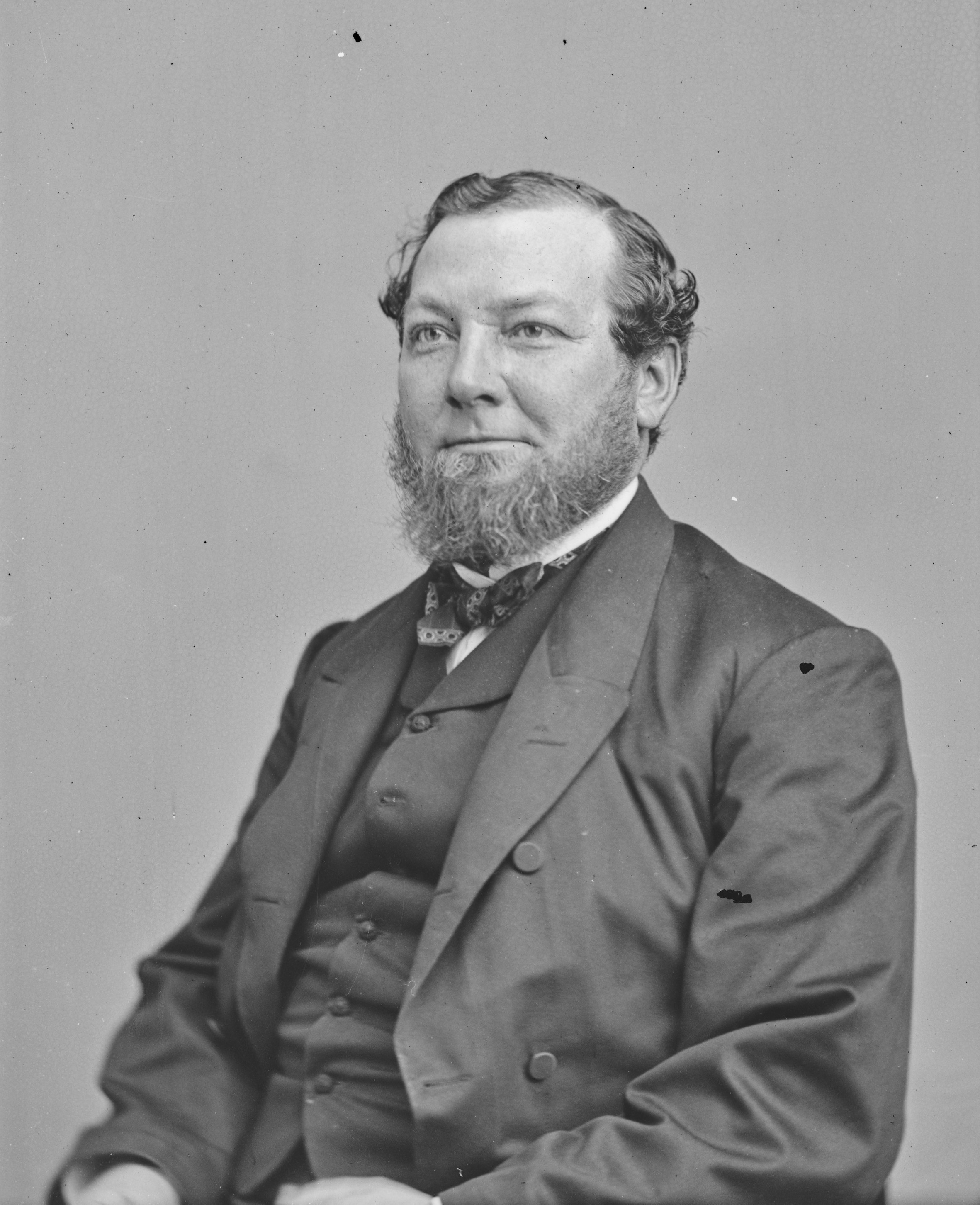
- Photo of Gunther by Mathew Brady

78th Mayor of New York City
- In office 1864–1866
- Preceded by: George Opdyke
- Succeeded by: John T. Hoffman

Personal details
- Born: April 7, 1822 New York City, New York, U.S.
- Died: January 22, 1885 (aged 62) New York City, New York, U.S.
- Resting place: Green-Wood Cemetery
- Party: Democratic

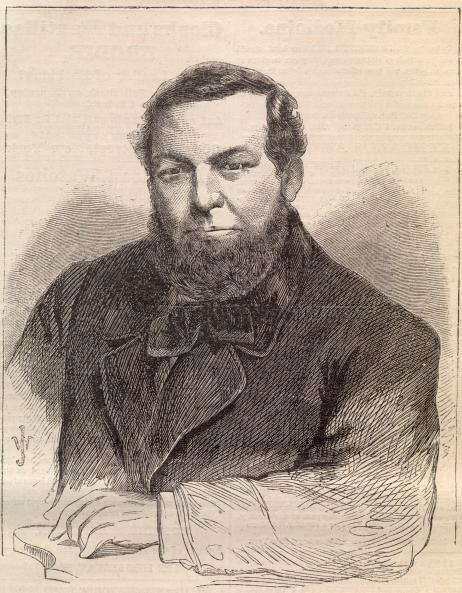
Charles Godfrey Gunther

Charles Godfrey Gunther (April 7, 1822 – January 22, 1885) was mayor of New York City from 1864 until 1866.

== Early life ==
Gunther was born in New York on April 7, 1822, (Note: At least once source gives his birthdate as February 7, 1822.) into a family of recent immigrants from Germany. His father, Christian G. Gunther, was a wealthy fur merchant, and Gunther would eventually join the family business.

Gunther was also a volunteer firefighter for many years.

== Political career ==
Gunther was active in Tammany Hall politics since his teenage years.

In 1861 he ran for mayor as a Democrat, but lost to Republican George Opdyke in an election fraught with Civil War complications. In 1863 Gunther ran again and was elected, serving his two-year term from 1864 until 1866.

== Later life ==
After leaving politics, Gunther became a railroad executive, working in that capacity until his death in New York on January 22, 1885.

He was buried in Brooklyn's Green-Wood Cemetery.

== See also ==
- German Americans

== Notes ==
Political offices
Preceded by George Opdyke	Mayor of New York City; 1864–1866	Succeeded by John T. Hoffman
