= Fernando Wood =

American politician (1812–1881)

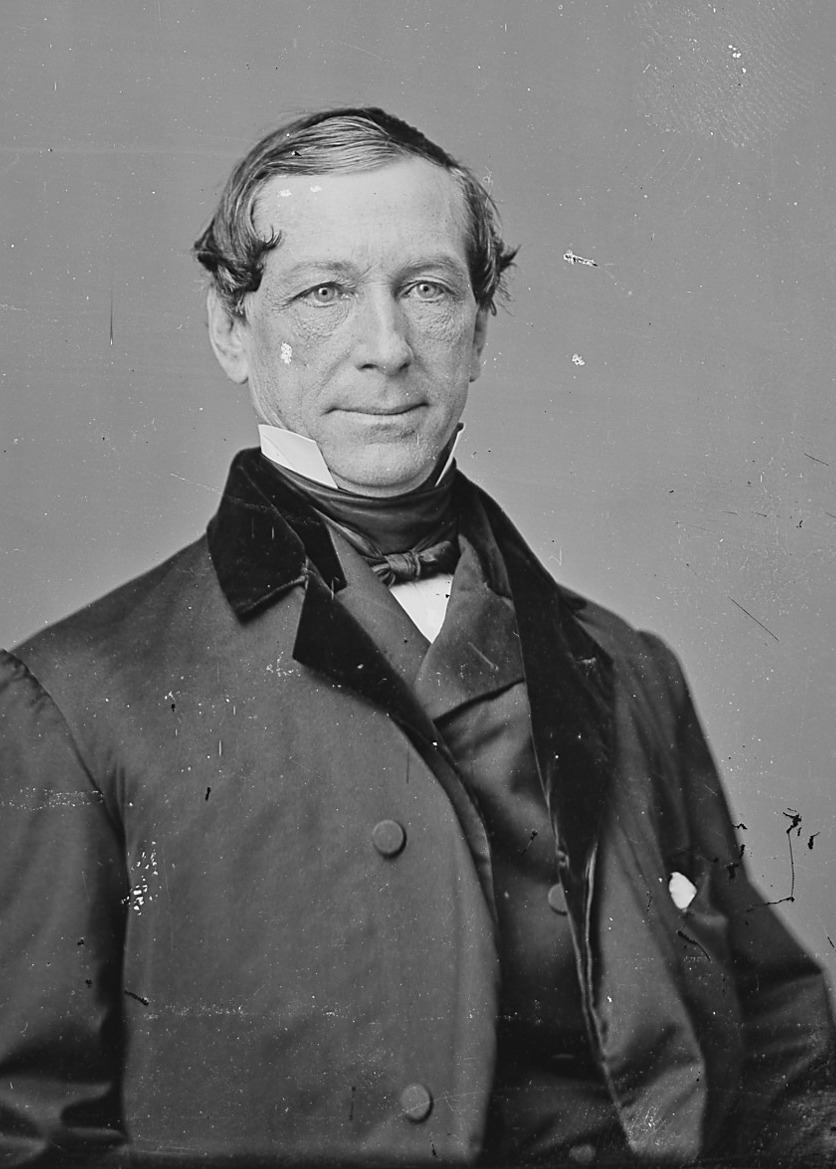
- Portrait by Mathew Brady, c. 1860

74th and 76th Mayor of New York City
- In office January 1, 1860 – December 31, 1861
- Preceded by: Daniel F. Tiemann
- Succeeded by: George Opdyke
- In office January 1, 1855 – December 31, 1857
- Preceded by: Jacob Aaron Westervelt
- Succeeded by: Daniel F. Tiemann

Member of the U.S. House of Representatives from New York
- In office March 4, 1867 – February 13, 1881
- Preceded by: William A. Darling
- Succeeded by: John Hardy
- Constituency: 9th district (1875–1881); 10th district (1873–1875); 9th district (1867–1873)
- In office March 4, 1863 – March 3, 1865
- Preceded by: William Wall
- Succeeded by: Nelson Taylor
- Constituency: 5th district
- In office March 4, 1841 – March 3, 1843
- Preceded by: Edward Curtis
- Succeeded by: Jonas P. Phoenix
- Constituency: 3rd district (Seat B)

Personal details
- Born: June 14, 1812 Philadelphia, Pennsylvania, U.S.
- Died: February 13, 1881 (aged 68) Hot Springs, Arkansas, U.S.
- Party: Democratic
- Spouses: Anna Taylor (m. 1831; div. 1839) Ann Dole Richardson (m. 1841; died 1859) Alice Fenner Mills (m. 1860)
- Children: 16, including Henry
- Relatives: Benjamin Wood (brother)
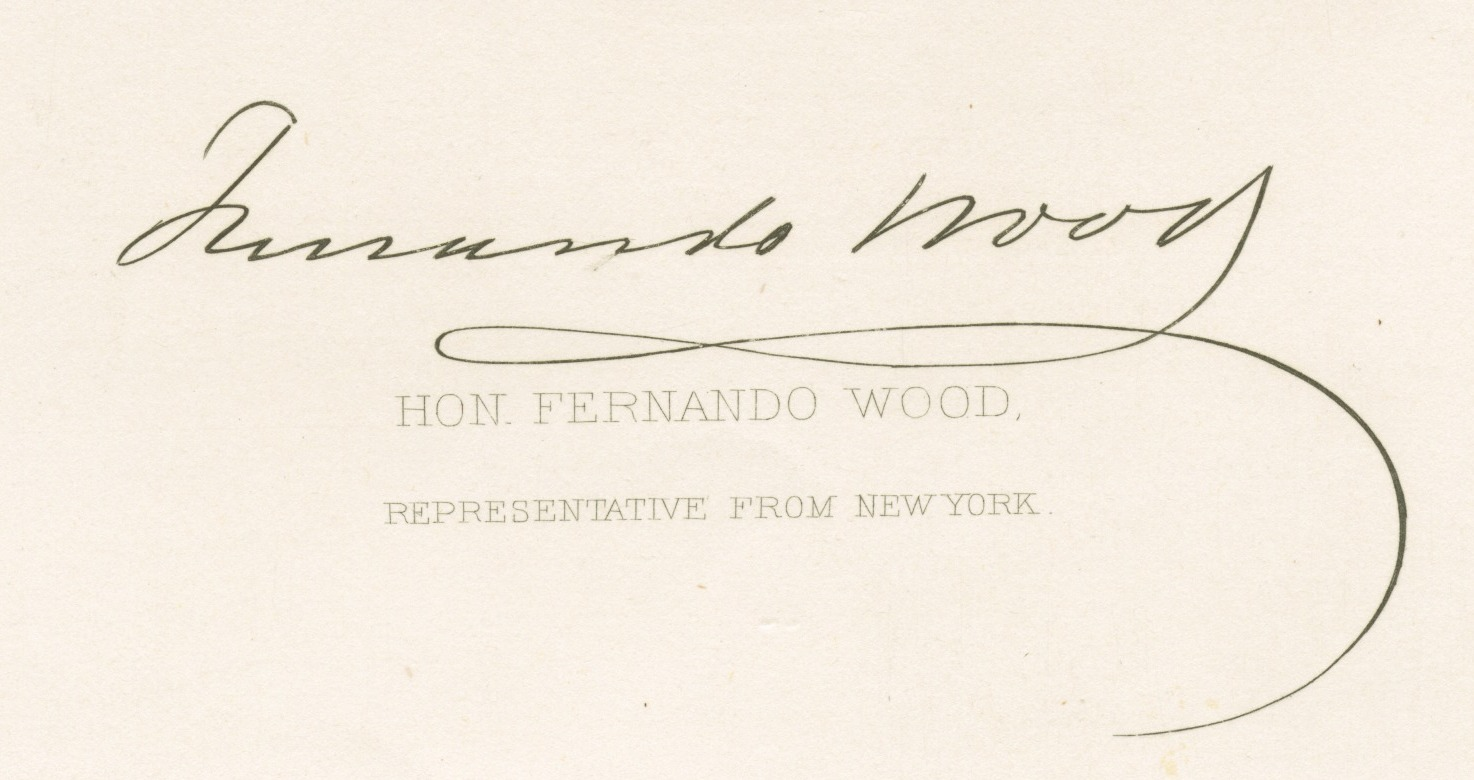
- Signature

Fernando Wood (June 14, 1812 – February 13, 1881) was an American Democratic Party politician, merchant, and real estate investor who served as the 74th and 76th mayor of New York City. (Note: Through most of Wood's life, the city of New York was coterminous with the island of Manhattan. The western portion of the modern-day Bronx was added in 1877. Queens, Brooklyn, and Staten Island were not consolidated into the city until after Wood's death in 1881.) He also represented the city for several terms in the United States House of Representatives.

After rapidly rising through Tammany Hall, Wood served a single term in the U.S. House before returning to private life and building a fortune in real estate speculation and maritime shipping.

He was elected mayor for the first time in 1854 and served three non-consecutive terms. His mayoralty was marked by an almost dictatorial vision of the office and political corruption in the city's appointed offices, including the New York City police force. His political appointments and his advocacy for unilateral reform of the city charter to strengthen his power and grant the city home rule brought him into direct conflict with the Republican state legislature, leading to a charter revision that prematurely ended his second term in office and resulted in his arrest. He returned to the mayor's office for a final term in 1860.

After leaving the mayor's office, Wood was elected to several more terms in the House of Representatives, where he served for sixteen years. In his final two terms in that office, he served as chairman of the powerful House Committee on Ways and Means.

Throughout his career, Wood expressed political sympathies for the Southern United States, including during the American Civil War. He was a member of the Copperhead faction, which opposed the war and called for an immediate peace settlement with the Confederacy. He once suggested to the New York City Council that the city should declare itself an independent city-state, as the "Free City of Tri-insula," in order to continue its profitable cotton trade with the Confederacy. In the House, he was a vocal opponent of President Abraham Lincoln and one of the main opponents of the Thirteenth Amendment, which abolished slavery in the United States.

== Early life ==
Fernando Wood was born in Philadelphia on June 14, 1812. His Spanish forename was chosen by his mother, who found it in The Three Spaniards, an English gothic novel written by George Walker.

His father, Benjamin Wood, was a speculator in dry goods who was bankrupted by the Panic of 1819. His mother, Rebecca (née Lehman) Wood, was the daughter of a recent German immigrant from Hamburg who had been wounded at the Battle of Yorktown.

Fernando had six siblings: four brothers and two sisters. His brother, named Benjamin Wood after their father, also served in the U.S. Congress. Throughout Fernando Wood's career, Benjamin was his sole trusted ally. As a partner in Wood, Eddy & Company, Benjamin owned and operated southern lotteries in New York City, a lucrative quasi-legal industry that his brother protected as mayor. Benjamin later also managed the affairs of Mozart Hall, the Democratic faction founded in 1859 by Fernando after the brothers lost control of Tammany Hall.

During Fernando's childhood, his father moved the family frequently: from Philadelphia to Shelbyville, Kentucky; New Orleans; Havana, Cuba; Charleston, South Carolina; and finally New York City, where he opened a tobacconist store in 1821. The business failed by 1829 and Benjamin Wood left for Charleston, where he died two years later, impoverished and alone.

=== Early business ===
In New York, Fernando enrolled in a private academy run by James Shea of Columbia College. He was educated in grammar, rhetoric, and mathematics. He left school in 1825 at age 13, as his father's business declined, in order to provide for his family. For six years, he worked throughout the Eastern United States in a variety of low-paying jobs, including as a stage actor. In 1831, he married his first wife, Anna W. Taylor, the 16-year old daughter of a Philadelphia merchant.

In 1832, Wood returned to New York City to live with his mother at 140 Greene Street. He struggled in business, often working nights at his wife's wine and tobacconist store on Pearl Street. In 1835, Wood started a ship chandler firm with Francis Secor and Joseph Scoville, but the business failed during the Panic of 1837. He soon opened a bar using his wife's dowry, which he was forced to close because business was so poor. In later years, after parting ways politically, Scoville accused Wood of overcharging drunken bar patrons.

== Rise through Tammany Hall ==
Despite his business failures, Wood was successful in politics. He joined the nascent Jacksonian Democratic Party, possibly influenced by his hatred of the Second Bank of the United States, which he blamed for his father's ruin. In 1836, party leaders elevated him to membership in the fraternal-political Tammany Society, the first rung on the New York Democratic ladder.

Tammany Hall was split between moderates, including Wood, and a breakaway faction of radicals known as Locofocos. When the Locofocos formed an independent Equal Rights Party, Wood remained in the Tammany organization, gaining promotion into the organization's Young Men's Committee and becoming its organizing force. However, following the Panic of 1837 and a Locofoco food riot, Wood worked to advance radical anti-bank politics within the Young Men's Committee. Wood's move was politically prescient; in September 1837, President Martin Van Buren, a Tammany Hall ally, signaled approval of Locofocoism. At a meeting later that month, the general Tammany organization voted in favor of Wood's motion to oust the Bank Democrats from the organization. Wood received a host of organization promotions.

== U.S. Representative (1841–43) ==
=== 1840 election ===
In October 1840, Wood's rise culminated with a nomination for the United States House of Representatives at just 28 years old. At this time, New York City elected its four members of the House on a single ticket. Wood campaigned on Anglophobic themes to appeal to Irish voters in the city, suggesting that "British stockjobbers" funded the Whig campaign in gold. He engaged in a war of words with New York American editor Charles King, who revealed that Wood had been found liable for $2,143.90 in overdraft fees after he fraudulently withdrew from his bank on the basis of a bookkeeping error.

In response, Wood published the statements of two of the referees in his case, a letter from the bank's Whig attorney, and a letter from his own attorney, which Wood combined to argue the bank had maligned him to help the Whig Party.

Wood and his Democratic running mates unseated the incumbent Whig ticket, though Wood received the fewest votes and only won his seat by 886 votes. The bank scandal remained a sore spot for Wood for years.

=== 27th Congress ===
In Congress, Wood served on the Public Buildings and Grounds Committee. He sought out the mentorship of Henry Clay, who had become estranged from the Whigs over his break with President John Tyler, and Southern Democrats like John C. Calhoun, Henry A. Wise, and James K. Polk. Wood's voting record was markedly pro-Southern and pro-slavery, more so than any other New York congressman.

On economic issues, Wood was an orthodox Democrat, favoring hard money, deflation, and free trade. However, he supported federal funding in New York, including appropriations for harbor improvements, fortifications, and the Brooklyn Navy Yard. Wood was also a staunch backer of federal subsidies for Samuel F.B. Morse's experimental telegraph. He was a vocal opponent of protectionist tariffs proposed by House Ways and Means chairman Millard Fillmore.

Wood also lobbied the U.S. State Department for protections for Irish political prisoners, some of whom were naturalized Americans, whom the British forcibly resettled on Tasmania.

==== 1842 election ====
Wood expected to run for re-election in 1842, but the New York City district was split into four separate districts by a congressional mandate.

Wood lived in the new fifth district, also home to popular incumbent John McKeon. To avoid facing McKeon in a primary, Wood relocated to a strong Whig district, the sixth, where instead he faced incumbent James I. Roosevelt and former Congressman Ely Moore for the Democratic nomination. After Roosevelt withdrew, Wood won a one-vote plurality in the primary, but fell short of the required majority. Moore withdrew in favor of McKeon, who had lost the nomination in his original district. McKeon won, and Wood covertly undermined him in the general election, invoking McKeon's Irish heritage and suggesting McKeon was a secret abolitionist. McKeon lost to Whig Hamilton Fish.

== Return to business ==
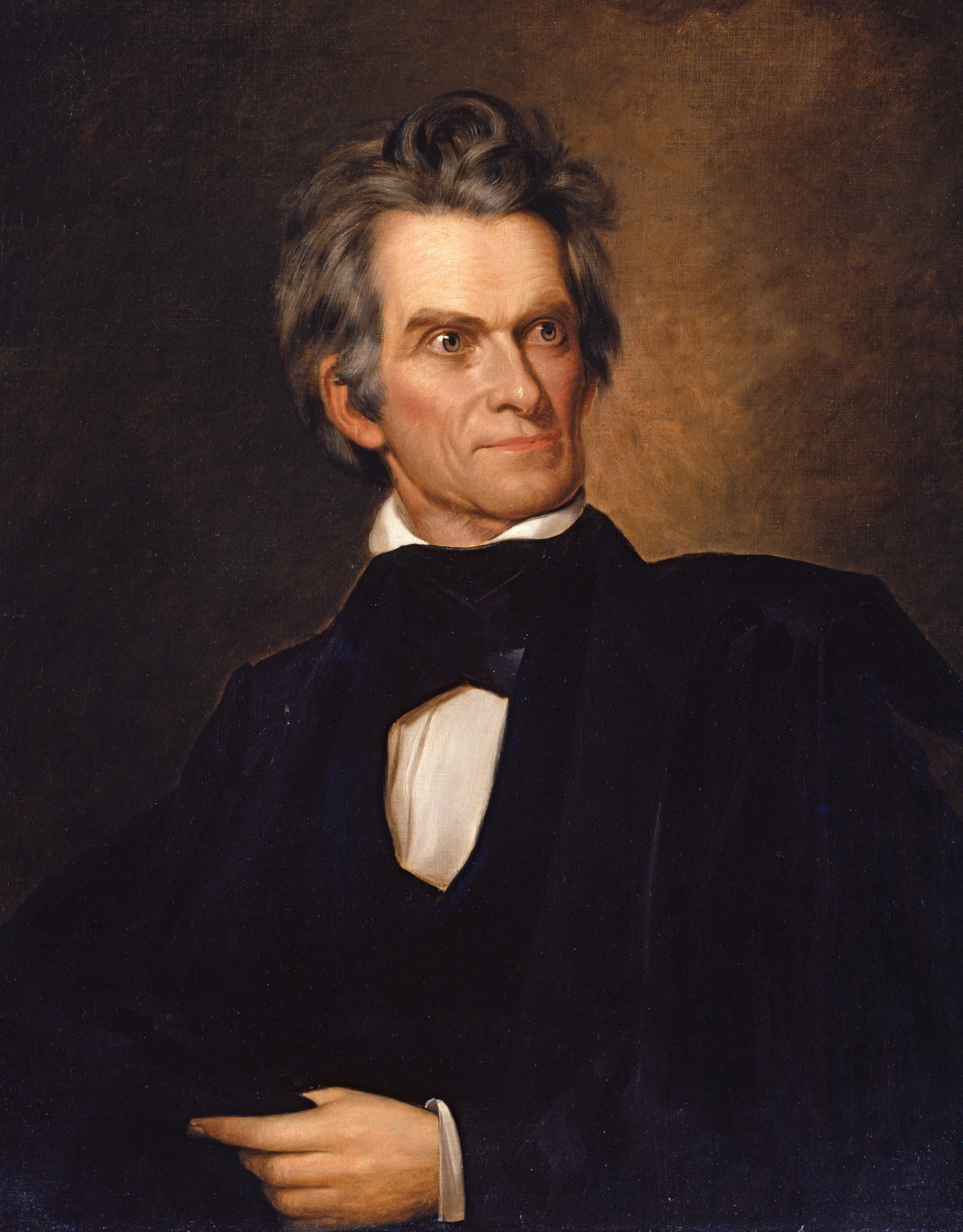
Wood's career and Southern sympathies were nurtured by Senator and later Secretary of State John C. Calhoun.

In need of funds and expecting his first child, Wood left politics after 1842 to reopen his ship chandler firm on the East River, announcing to his friends that he was "entirely out of politics."

To accrue necessary capital, Wood begged Henry A. Wise for a patronage appointment as the State Department's local despatch agent, despite previously having tried to abolish the role when he was a congressman. Though Secretary of State Abel Upshur refused, he was soon killed in an accident aboard the USS Princeton and succeeded by John C. Calhoun, who granted Wood the appointment on May 8, 1844.

With his government job as a subsidy and political power base, Wood expanded his business and rented a new home in upper Manhattan with three servants. Except for his efforts on behalf of presidential nominee James K. Polk and in defense of his own patronage position, he remained largely outside politics.

=== 1844 presidential election ===
In advance of the 1844 Democratic National Convention, which was expected to be a showdown between Calhoun and Martin Van Buren, Wood acted as a double agent on behalf of Van Buren. Calhoun supporters, seeking to peel Tammany away from Van Buren, invited Wood to strategy meetings and sought his advice on courting New York delegates. However, Wood covertly passed this information to Van Buren. Though Calhoun never found Wood out, the affair left Van Buren suspicious of Wood's character and the former President's son, John Van Buren, became Wood's political rival for the next two decades.

After the nomination went to dark horse James K. Polk, Wood renewed their friendship and launched into a campaign for Polk in New York City, New Jersey, and the Southern Tier. Wood used his political connections to Polk to save his patronage job under new Secretary of State James Buchanan.

=== Real estate ===
Wood massively expanded his wealth by entering the real estate market, at first by accident. In 1848, using his second wife's modest fortune, he took out a $4,000 (~$116,998 in 2024) mortgage on a 150 acre plot on Bloomingdale Road. As New York's population boomed and development hastened, real estate values skyrocketed. Along with subsequent purchases from the same estate, Wood accumulated a property worth over $650,000. Using this property as security, he engaged in a series of successful purchases in nearly every ward of Manhattan. William Tweed later said of Wood, "I never yet went to get a corner lot that I didn't find Wood had got in ahead of me." During his time as mayor, Fernando Wood sat on the Sinking Fund Commission that oversaw the first inventory of city-owned land in nearly twenty years. He oversaw the auction of these city lands in successive waves during his tenure in office, which gave him an advantage in purchasing. Wood also intervened periodically into land sales associated with street openings, a fiscal and legal process.

In 1852, Wood expanded his holdings to San Francisco. By 1855, his growing fortune was estimated at $200,000; in 1861, $500,000. Wood himself reported personal holdings of $1,200,000 at the 1860 census ($43,000,000 in 2025 dollars).

=== Gold Rush and Cater affair ===
In October 1848, in the early stages of the California Gold Rush, Wood and four other partners chartered a barque, the John C. Cater, to sell goods and equipment in San Francisco. The goods were sold at inflated prices, and the Cater maintained a profitable trade transporting passengers and lumber between Oregon and San Francisco.

It was later discovered that Wood defrauded his brother-in-law, Edward E. Marvine, in order to obtain the necessary start-up capital for the Cater. Wood presented his brother-in-law with a fraudulent letter, purportedly from a "Thomas O'Larkin" in Monterey, California, suggesting the venture. Marvine was convinced by this letter and convinced three more investors to join. Marvine later sued Wood for $20,000 in fraud. In 1851, Wood was indicted by a grand jury, but the judges quashed the charges because the statute of limitations expired a day before the court was to rule on the matter. Wood was accused, without substantiation, of bribing the Whig district attorney with $700 to delay the charges until the statute of limitations expired. In 1855, the New York Supreme Court ordered Wood to pay Marvine $8,000 and the other partners $5,635.40. Wood filed an appeal that dragged on for another six years.

During the case, Wood maintained his innocence and brought a libel suit against the New York Sun for prematurely printing details of Marvine's deposition.

== Mayor of New York City ==
In the words of biographer Jerome Mushkat, Mayor Wood was "a unique figure, New York's first modern mayor, a city builder, and the prototype for later municipal leaders, a man who anticipated much of what became the urban Progressive Movement." His mayoralty was marked by his push for home rule and charter reform, as well as accusations of corruption in city government by his opponents.

Wood was the first New York City mayor linked to Tammany Hall.

=== 1850 campaign ===
Wood was nominated for Mayor of New York City for the first time in 1850 with the support of "Soft Shell Democrats" who supported the 1849 state Democratic platform, which called for protection of slavery where it existed but recognized Congress's right to prevent its extension to new American territories. He was defeated by Ambrose C. Kingsland in a landslide for the Whig Party.

=== 1854 campaign ===
Wood began organizing his political return in November 1853, courting both the Soft and Hard factions in opposition to Free Soil Democrats, who opposed any extension of slavery whatsoever. He also sought influence in the secretive new Know-Nothing nativist movement, despite his base of support in the city's immigrant communities.

Wood was easily nominated for a second time, though a faction of Hard Democrats nominated Wilson J. Hunt. Wood's campaign was nearly upended by his Know-Nothing involvement, but he survived the accusations to win with just 33.6% of the vote.

=== First term (1855–56) ===
In his first two-year term, Wood sought to strengthen the office of mayor and establish "one-man rule" in advance of proposals to unilaterally modernize the city's economy, improve its public works, and reduce wealth inequality.

He was very popular in New York and throughout the country, and gained the nickname "the Model Mayor."

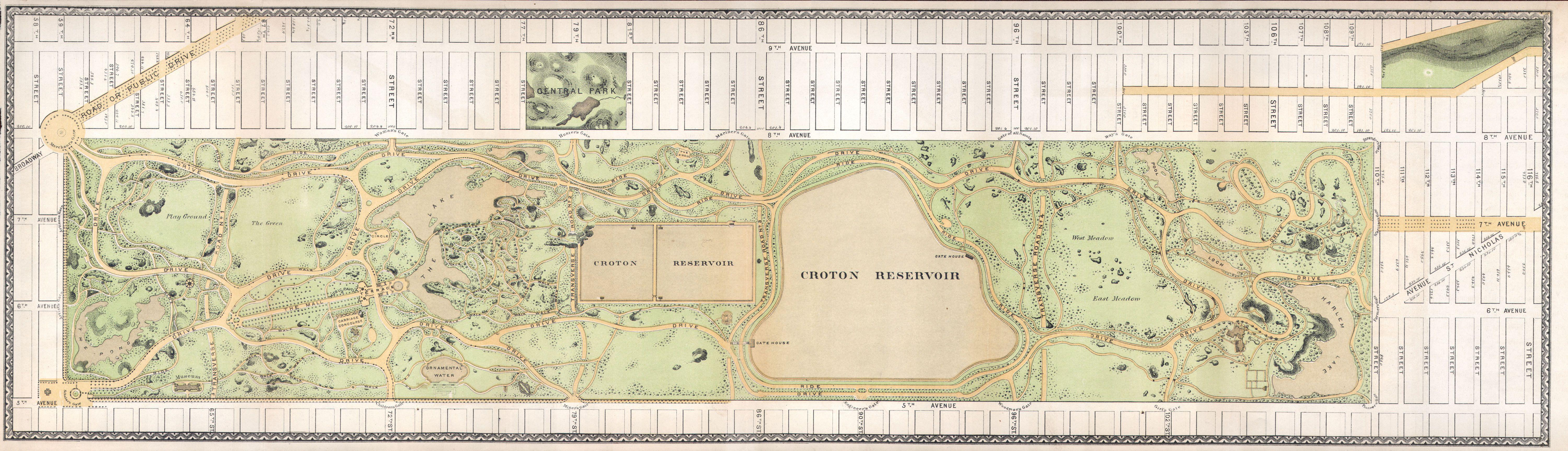
During his first term in office, Wood oversaw construction of the planned Central Park, depicted here as it stood in 1868.

However, his attempts at reform were quickly overshadowed by failure to answer accusations of corruption in his handling of the police force. His political base was eroded entirely in the 1855 elections, leaving Wood on the defensive for the remainder of his term. Nonetheless, his vision for the mayoralty as a powerful central executive and his campaign for greater home rule for New York City came to define the city's politics for generations.

He embarked on several large spending programs, including modernizing the city's wharfs by replacing wooden structures with stone, new safety features for the city's railways, construction of the already-planned Central Park, and expansion of the city's grid plan. Attempts to crack down on vice were largely abandoned for political and practical reasons.

=== 1856 gubernatorial campaign and re-election ===
Wood was an early supporter of James Buchanan for the 1856 Democratic nomination and attempted to parlay this support into a nomination on Buchanan's ticket for Governor of New York. However, an expected endorsement by Buchanan never materialized and Wood was seen as too extreme by state leaders. Both the Hard and Soft factions unified on the candidacy of Amasa J. Parker, who ultimately lost the election.

Instead, Wood stood for re-election as mayor on a platform of charter reform, in defiance of a one-term tradition. The general election campaign was marked by personal attacks and street violence committed by the various political gangs in the city. On election day, Wood furloughed or relieved many police officers of duty, allowing his own gang, the Dead Rabbits, to menace voters and steal ballot boxes. He won the race with 44.6% of the vote, though he trailed Buchanan by a wide margin due to fractures in the city party. Despite his evident abuse of police powers and encouragement of violence, a grand jury declined to indict Wood on the grounds that such practices were common in the city's history and at the time.

=== Second term (1857) ===
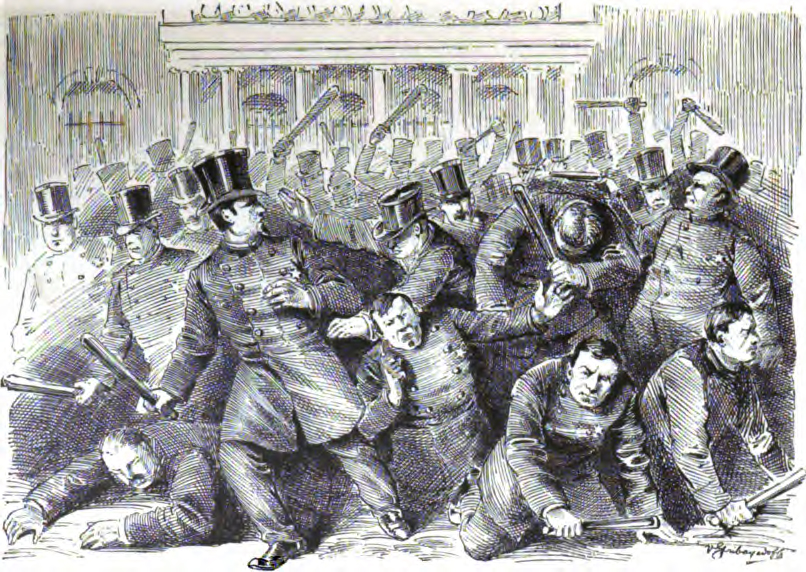
Wood's second term in office was marred by the Great Police riot in June 1857.

In Wood's second term, his control over Tammany Hall unraveled and his handling of the police force boiled over in the New York City Police riot and Dead Rabbits riot.

In April, the Republican legislature passed a new City Charter which truncated Wood's current term to one year, a Police Reform Act dissolving Wood's Municipal police in favor of a Metropolitan state unit, and an Excise Act implementing restrictive liquor licensing throughout the state. Wood committed himself to resisting the Police Reform Act and maintaining his own Municipal police, culminating in a police riot and Wood's orchestrated arrest on June 16.

=== 1857 election ===
In the December 1857 election, Tammany joined with Republicans and Know-Nothings in endorsing Daniel F. Tiemann over Wood. The economic devastation of the Panic of 1857 dominated the campaign, and Wood pursued public works programs to provide jobs and food for the city's poor citizens.

Wood was denied a third successive term by a narrow margin of 3,000 votes.

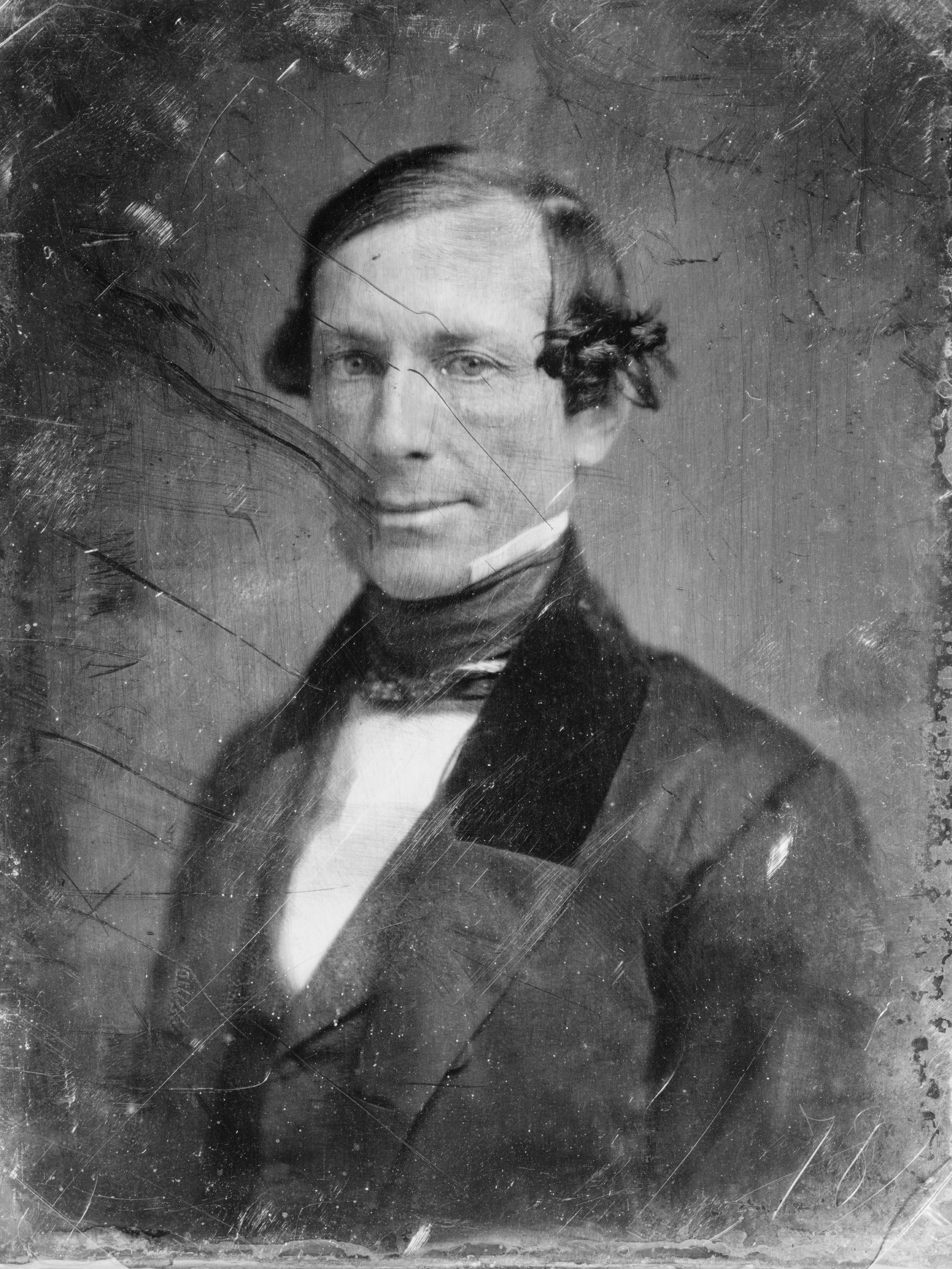
Portrait by Matthew Brady

=== Return to mayoralty and support for Confederacy ===
Wood served a third mayoral term in 1860 and 1861. Wood was one of many New York City Democrats sympathetic to the Confederacy, called 'Copperheads' by the staunch Unionists. In 1860, at a meeting to choose New York's delegates to the Democratic convention in Charleston, S.C., Wood outlined his case against the abolitionist cause and the "Black Republicans" who supported it. He was of the opinion that "until we have provided and cared for the oppressed laboring man in our own midst, we should not extend our sympathy to the laboring men of other States." In January 1861, Wood suggested to the New York City Council that New York secede and declare itself a free city in order to continue its profitable cotton trade with the Confederacy.

Wood's Democratic machine was concerned with maintaining the revenues that maintained the patronage, which depended on Southern cotton. Wood's suggestion was greeted with derision by the Common Council. Tammany Hall was highly factionalized until after the Civil War. Wood and his faction cocreated and he headed his own organization named Mozart Hall. New York City commercial interests wanted to retain their relations with the South, but within the framework of the Constitution.

== Return to U.S. House ==
Subsequent to serving his third mayoral term, Wood served again in the House of Representatives from 1863 to 1865, then again from 1867 until his death in Hot Springs, Arkansas on February 13, 1881.

Wood unsuccessfully sought the New York City mayoral again in 1867 as an independent candidate backed by Mozart Hall political forces.

=== Civil War and Reconstruction ===
Wood was one of the main opponents of the Thirteenth Amendment to the United States Constitution which abolished slavery and was critical in blocking the measure in the House when it first came up for a vote in June 1864. Wood attacked anti-slavery War Democrats as having "a white man's face on the body of a negro," and supported state-level Democratic Party platforms that advocated constitutional amendments protecting slavery. He argued that the amendment "strikes at property" and took the power of regulating slavery away from the states, where it rightfully belonged.

On January 15, 1868, Wood was censured for the use of unparliamentary language. During debate on the floor of the House of Representatives, Wood called a piece of legislation "A monstrosity, a measure the most infamous of the many infamous acts of this infamous Congress." An uproar immediately followed this utterance, and Wood was not permitted to continue. This was followed by a motion by Henry L. Dawes to censure Wood, which passed by a vote of 114-39.

Notwithstanding his censure, Wood still managed to defeat Dr. Francis Thomas, the Republican candidate, by a narrow margin in the election of that year.

Wood served as chairman for the Committee on Ways and Means in both the 45th and 46th Congress (1877–1881).

== Personal life ==
=== Personality and appearance ===
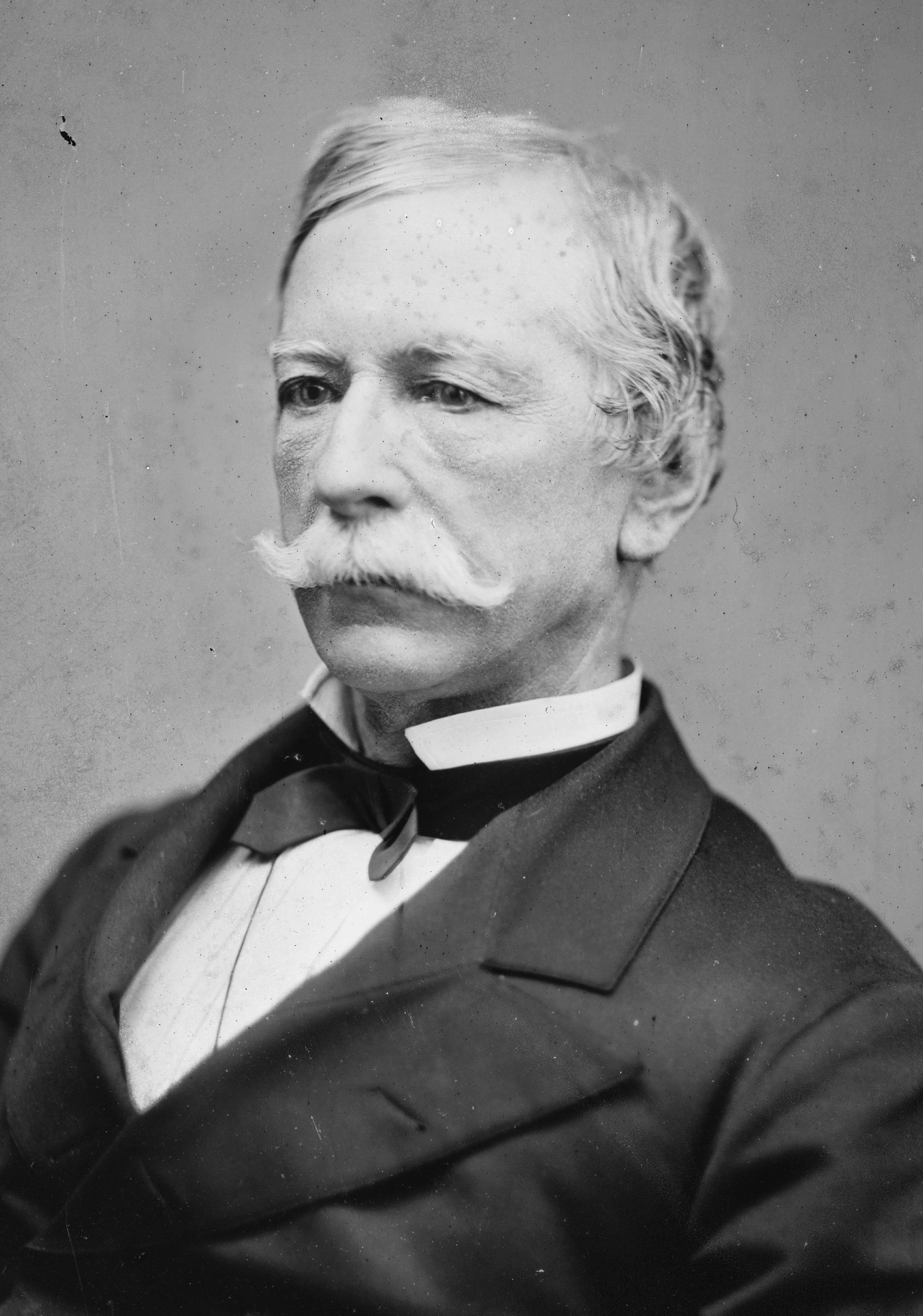
Wood later in life

Wood was slightly over six feet, making him tall for his time. Contemporaries described him as "strikingly handsome," but he dressed plainly and showed little emotion. Wood's biographer Jerome Mushkat describes him as a totally self-reliant man of "soaring ambition" and "an almost dictatorial obsession to control men and events."

=== Marriages and family ===
Wood's brother Benjamin Wood purchased the New York Daily News (not to be confused with the current New York Daily News, which was founded in 1919), supported Stephen A. Douglas, and was elected to Congress, where he made a name as an opponent of pursuing the American Civil War.

Wood was married three times and had 16 children, seven from his second marriage to Anna Richardson and nine from his third marriage to Alice Mills. Among his children with Mills were Henry Alexander Wise Wood.

His first marriage (1831–39) to Anna Taylor of Philadelphia ended in divorce upon Wood's discovery of her frequent adultery. Their marriage was childless and a court decreed that Anna could not marry again during Wood's lifetime. He never spoke of her again, but a political enemy later claimed she had become an alcoholic prostitute.

In 1841 he married Anna Dole Richardson, who died in 1859. Anna was a direct descendant of William Penn through her mother, and her father, Judge Joseph L. Richardson, was well-connected with upstate politicians including President Van Buren, Silas Wright, and William C. Bouck. During his second marriage, having built a second fortune, Wood and his wife joined the Protestant Episcopal Church.

In 1860 he married Alice Fenner Mills, the 16-year-old daughter of retired Republican financier and railroad executive C. Drake Mills.

=== Ancestry ===
The Wood family traces its lineage in America to around 1670, when Henry Wood, a carpenter and Quaker, migrated from Wales to Newport, Rhode Island. He later moved his family to West Jersey, where he established a homestead along the Delaware River.

Fernando Wood's grandfather Henry Wood was born in 1758 and served in the American Revolution as a captain. He was wounded at the battles of Germantown and Yorktown.

Little is known about Wood's maternal line.

== Death and legacy ==
Wood died in Hot Springs, Arkansas on February 13, 1881. He was buried in the Trinity Church Cemetery and Mausoleum, in New York, N.Y.

In Martin Scorsese's Gangs of New York, Wood is portrayed by Christian Burgess.

In Steven Spielberg's Lincoln, Wood is portrayed by Lee Pace as a leading opponent of the president and of the Thirteenth Amendment.

== See also ==
- List of members of the United States Congress who died in office (1790–1899)
- List of United States representatives expelled, censured, or reprimanded

== Notes ==
U.S. House of Representatives
Preceded by Moses H. Grinnell; Edward Curtis; James Monroe; Ogden Hoffman	Member of the U.S. House of Representatives from New York's 3rd congressional district Seat B 1841–1843 with Charles G. Ferris, James I. Roosevelt, and John McKeon	Succeeded by Jonas P. Phoenix
Preceded by William Wall	Member of the U.S. House of Representatives from New York's 5th congressional district 1863–1865	Succeeded by Nelson Taylor
Preceded by William A. Darling	Member of the U.S. House of Representatives from New York's 9th congressional district 1867–1873	Succeeded by David B. Mellish
Preceded by Clarkson Potter	Member of the U.S. House of Representatives from New York's 10th congressional district 1873–1875	Succeeded by Abram S. Hewitt
Preceded by Richard Schell	Member of the U.S. House of Representatives from New York's 9th congressional district 1875–1881	Succeeded by John Hardy
Preceded by William Ralls Morrison	Chair of the House Ways and Means Committee; 1877–1881	Succeeded by John Tucker
Party political offices
Preceded by Isaac V. Fowler	Grand Sachem of Tammany Hall; 1850–1856	Succeeded by Isaac V. Fowler
Preceded by Isaac V. Fowler	Grand Sachem of Tammany Hall; 1855–1857	Succeeded by Isaac V. Fowler; William Tweed
Political offices
Preceded by Jacob Aaron Westervelt	Mayor of New York City; 1855–1857	Succeeded by Daniel F. Tiemann
Preceded by Daniel F. Tiemann	Mayor of New York City; 1860–1861	Succeeded by George Opdyke
