= Consolidated National Bank =

Former New York City bank

- Industry: Banking
- Predecessors: None
- Founded: July 1, 1902 (organized); September 22, 1902 (open for business)
- Founders: Mortimer H. Wagar
- Defunct: March 7, 1909 (merged into National Reserve Bank)
- Fate: Merged
- Successors: National Reserve Bank of the City of New York
- Headquarters: Manhattan, New York City, United States
- Key people: Mortimer Wagar
- Services: Banking, etc.

Consolidated National Bank of New York was a bank operating in New York City. Also referred to in the press as Consolidated National Bank, the institution was organized on July 1, 1902, with capital of $1 million. Wrote The New York Times, the bank was "founded with the idea of cornering the business of the Consolidated Exchange and its brokers." The bank opened for business at 57 Broadway on September 22, 1902, and a year later the bank took out a five-year lease at the Exchange Court Building. In 1906, the Consolidated Stock Exchange withdrew its deposits with the Consolidated National Bank. In 1909, the bank voted to acquire the assets of Oriental Bank and merge them with Consolidated, creating the National Reserve Bank. The Consolidated name was operative for a short time afterwards.

== History ==
=== 1902: Formation ===
On February 11, 1902, The New York Times reported that around $600,000 had been subscribed to the capitalization of the Consolidated National Bank, with organization by founding president Mortimer H. Wagar. Wagar had been president of the Consolidated Stock and Petroleum Exchange, or the Consolidated Stock Exchange of New York, from which he retired around 1902 to join the Consolidated National Bank. Also by February 11, 1902, a lease for portions of two floors in the Pinkerton Building at 57 Broadway had been arranged for the institution, with three months estimated until the start of the bank's opening.

The Consolidated National Bank was organized on July 1, 1902. With fourteen members on the bank's board of directors, the officers were headquartered at 51 Broadway, with capital of $1 million. In late August 1902, the bank elected three new directors. On September 12, 1902, The New York Times reported that the organization of the Consolidated National Bank of New York had been completed with the filing of papers with the Controller of the Currency, with the first directors meeting held the subsequent week. The office was stated to be set for 37 Broadway in Manhattan. The bank opened at No. 57 Broadway on Monday, September 22, 1902, with capital of $1,000,000 and a surplus of $1,000,000. Willis S. Paine was founding president.

=== 1902-1905: Early profits ===
On October 23, 1902, the bank received the first amount of the cash it ordered, equating to $20,000 in the form of new five-dollar bank notes with Benjamin Harrison. The remainder of the $250,000 in bank notes ordered by the bank was delivered in tens and twenty dollar bills. The New York Times reported it as a "new national banknote," writing that "the back of the note is green and not brown, as is the case with the notes of most other banks." At close of business day on November 25, 1902, the bank had profits of $1,012,995, and deposits of $2,607,946. It also had loans of 2,529,810. Total resources equated to $4,930,742. Then situated at 57 Broadway, in September 1903, the bank took out a five-year lease on around 2,500 square feet of ground floor at the Exchange Court Building, which was located at the corner of Broadway and Exchange Place.

It was reported on April 16, 1904, that Consolidated National Bank, with Willis Paine still as president, would begin clearing through the Fourth National Bank. By November 16, 1904 Willis S. Paine served as president, with Mortimer H. Wagar as vice president.

On January 8, 1905, the bank's president Willis S. Paine published a full-page op-ed in The New York Times arguing for frequent examinations of bank finances. The annual directors meeting was held in January 1905, with several directors resigning or voted out. Stock for the bank was originally issued at $200, and by September 20, 1905, was selling around $175, and had paid no dividends. President Paine, when asked about the bank's ability to make money, stated "none of the banks has been making money. With money at 2.5 per cent, or 3 per cent., there is no chance to make money. The trust companies perhaps have been making money recently, but the banks have not." Willis S. Paine resigned the presidency of the Consolidated National Bank of New York City around November 1905, with announced plans to travel the world.

=== 1905-1907: Change in leadership ===
The day before November 1, 1905, the board elected O.F. Thomas as new president, replacing Willis S. Paine after Paine's resignation. At the time, The New York Times reported that the bank "has not been doing well in the matter of earnings, and Mr. Thomas, it was said had been brought into the bank's management in the belief that he would be instrumental in building up its business." At the time, the bank's original organizer, M.H. Wagar, stated that the original business model of catering to Consolidated Exchange depositors had not worked well overall, and that, as reported by the Times, "the institution from this time on was to be regarded as seeking a general business without any special reference to the interests of the Consolidated Exchange."

On February 9, 1906, the Consolidated Stock Exchange withdrew its deposits with the Consolidated National Bank and moved them to the National Bank of North America. Wrote the Times the next day, "the Consolidated National Bank was founded with the idea of cornering the business of the Consolidated Exchange and its brokers, but since the bank passed into Mr. E.R. THomas's control after another of the Exchange officers have withdrawn from its Directorate." By July 1907, the bank's shares were selling on the open market for $180 each. E.R. Thomas sold his interest in the Consolidated National Bank in October 1907, also resigning from his positions. On December 14, 1907, the Times reported that Consolidated National Bank was in the works to acquire the National Bank of North America. The deal was vetoed on December 17, 1907, by National's president. According to the Times, the proposal had been "the purpose of the Consolidated National Bank's Directors to effect a reduction of the capital of their bank, which, with its surplus, is very much more than the present requirements of the business done, thereby returning to the stockholders a large amount of cash per share. This cash was to be used in acquiring stock in the National Bank of North America."

=== 1909: National Reserve Bank ===
On February 2, 1909, Consolidated ratified a plan to acquire the Oriental Bank "by allowing its shareholders to subscribe to the shares of a new institution at $150 a share." The Oriental Bank had closed the year prior, but had paid its depositors in full. The new institution, to be named the National Reserve Bank, combined aspects of both banks. A special meeting was called for February 18 for final ratification by stockholders. On February 18, 1909, the bank stockholders voted to enact the merger proposed by the directors, to take over the assets of Oriental Bank and merge them with Consolidated, creating the National Reserve Bank of the City of New York. The plan increased capital of the bank from $1,000,000 to $1,200,000. At the same meeting, 23 directors were elected to the new board, including E. A. Fisher and Mortimer H. Wagar. The bank planned to keep the Consolidated name operative until March 1, 1909. On March 2, 1909, Will-tarn O. Allison (W.O. Allison), president of Consolidated National Bank, was voted president of the new National Reserve Bank entity formed by Consolidated's absorption of Oriental Bank's assets. Thomas J. Lewis and R. W. Jones Jr. were elected vice presidents, and George W. Adams, cashier. With the merger of the reorganized Oriental Bank with the Consolidated National Bank of New York, capital was increased from $1,000,000 to $2,000,000. The National Reserve Bank of the City of New York formally opened its doors for business on March 8, 1909, at "the old banking quarters of the Oriental Bank" at 182 Broadway, corner of John Street in Manhattan, until new facilities at the City Investing Building could be completed at 165 Broadway. In late April 1909, the National Reserve Bank, formerly named Consolidated National Bank, opened for business in the City Investing Building.

== Directors ==
When the Consolidated National Bank was organized on July 1, 1902, the fourteen directors included Jonathan B. Currey, Mortimer H. Wagar, George S. Hart, Willis S. Paine, R. A. Chesebrough, Chalence Whitman, Edward G. Burgess, Oscar L. Richard, O.D. Ashlay, George Crocker, John W. Griggs, J. Temple Gwathmey, Henry C. Brewster, and Perry Belmont. In late August 1902, the bank elected Amzi L. Barber, Lyman G. Bloomingdale of Bloomingdale Brothers, and James G. Newcomb as directors. The first directors meeting was held in late September 1902.

On April 16, 1904, with Willis Paine still as president, four new directors were added. It was reported on April 16, 1904, that new directors were added to Consolidated including Alonzo Burbank, Thomas F. Manville, William T. Brown, and Charles H. Patterson. Early directors as of November 16, 1904 included Wagar, Chas H. Patterson, O.W. Richard. Willis S. Paine served as president, with Mortimer H. Wagar as vice president. John W. Griggs retired as a director around November 1905. On October 31, 1905, board vacancies were filled by E.R. Thomas, O.F. Thomas, Robert Maclay, and George B. Hays, all who were selected by E.R. Thomas. Four vacancies remained on the board, after the retirement of Willis S. Paine, O. M. Farrand, and J. W. Griggs.

== See also ==
- List of banks in the Americas
- List of bank mergers in the United States
- Mutual Alliance Trust Company
- Consolidated Stock Exchange
