= Senator Laning =

Senator Laning may refer to:

- Albert P. Laning (1817–1880), New York State Senate
- J. Ford Laning (1853–1941), Ohio State Senate
