= Everglades Club =

Social club in Palm Beach, Florida, US

Coordinates: 26°42′1.23″N 80°2′28.3″W

The Everglades Club
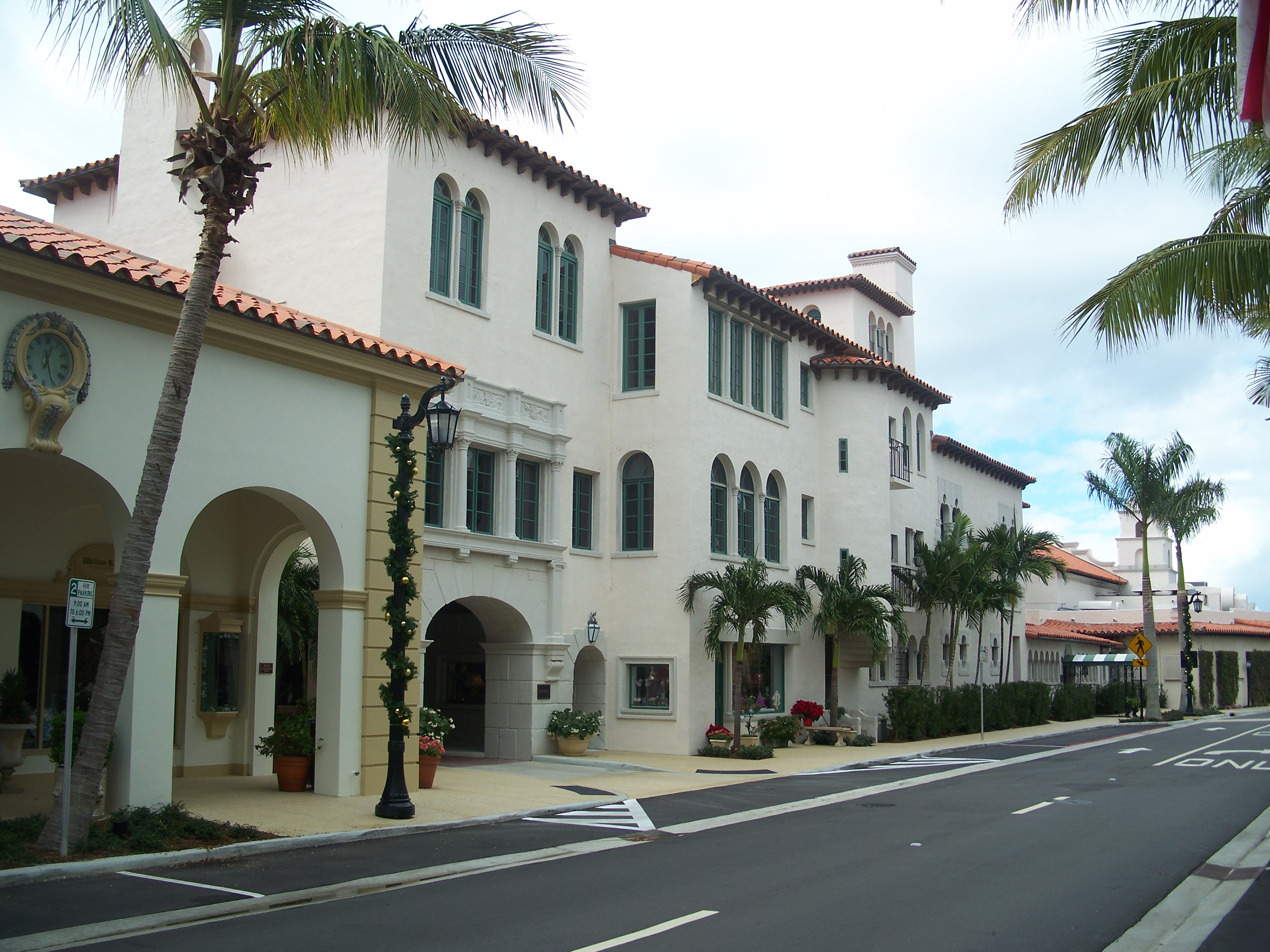
- Formation: January 25, 1919
- Purpose: social club, golf club
- Location(s): 356 Worth Avenue; Palm Beach, Florida
- Members: Not publicly available
- Key people: Paris Singer, Addison Mizner
- Website: None

The Everglades Club is a social club in Palm Beach, Florida. When its construction began in July 1918, it was to be called the Touchstone Convalescent Club, and it was intended to be a hospital for the wounded of World War I. When the war ended a few months later, and it changed into a private club.

== History ==
Paris Singer and his good friend, the architect Addison Mizner, were visiting Palm Beach in the spring of 1918. Singer decided to build a hospital with Mizner as the architect. Singer had already built three hospitals in France for the wounded. It was during World War I when only war-related buildings could be built. Construction began in July. (The site at the west end of Worth Avenue formerly contained Alligator Joe's, a tourist attraction.) By November 1918 seven residential villas and a medical center had been built on the north side of Worth Avenue, across from the main building. Singer purchased laboratory and surgical equipment and fittings for an operating room. Singer sent out as many as 300,000 invitations to eligible Army and Navy officers, who had to be screened and had to be able to pay their own room and board.

However, World War I had ended, and most former soldiers wanted to go home. The hospital was reinvisioned as a private club; the medical equipment was donated to a hospital in West Palm Beach. There was a main building, eight separate villas, tennis courts, a parking garage across the street, and a yacht basin. The club opened on 25 January 1919. Paris Singer was the President of the club and he decided who could become a member. For its second season in 1920, Mizner supervised the construction of a nine-hole golf course and the landscaping of the club's 60 acres. He also built Via Mizner, an addition on Worth Avenue with eleven apartments and sixteen shops.

Mizner's design for the Everglades Club was widely considered to be the biggest success of his career." It helped establish a new architectural style for Florida. In the club's first season Mizner received four architectural commissions. He went on to become America's foremost society architect of his era.

Singer began his club with twenty-five charter members. Two years later, the membership was closed at 500 members. Eliza Osgood Vanderbilt Webb (1860–1936) was one of its earliest female members. Businessman Jack C. Massey was a member.

An additional nine holes were added to the golf course in 1930.

=== 21st century ===
By 1999, the club's initiation fees were reportedly around $35,000.

As of 2022, the club deliberately does not have a website. Cellphones are prohibited on the property.

In 2023, Connecticut College president Katherine Bergeron's decision to host a fundraiser at the Everglades Club was met with protests by the college's students. The school's dean of equity and inclusion also resigned after he objected to the school's plans.

== Membership policies ==
The club has been criticized for alleged discrimination against Jewish and Black people; however, the club's founder Paris Singer was Jewish and a portrait of him hangs in the building.

One 2009 article reports anecdotes of alleged discrimination including that Sammy Davis Jr. was turned away at the door and that socialite C.Z. Guest stated that she and her husband were temporarily suspended from the club after they brought Estée Lauder (who is Jewish) and her husband to a party there. The same report cites a then-member as stating the club had many Jewish members, and that one's religion was not an actively discussed issue at the club.

As of 2014, there has never been an African-American member. According to 2009 president William Panill, no African-American has ever applied. The Club now has Jewish members, but how many is unknown because, according to Panill, "we don't ask." Panill admitted in 2009 that he receives inquiries about whether a member can bring a Jewish guest.

"And I know that people have called me on the phone when I—in the first years, and said I have so and so guest in my house, he's the president of some big university, he's Jewish, can I bring him to the Everglades Club? I say absolutely, no problem at all. Anybody you have in your home or anybody that's a friend of yours, bring them. And they brought them and there had been no incident of any complaining, or, and no letters issued, or no. I have many friends that are Jewish people that come to the club and they are welcome there, and there's no problem with it."

== Famous members ==
- Willis S. Paine (1848–1927)
- Eliza Osgood Vanderbilt Webb (1860–1936)
- Clarence H. Geist (1866–1938)
- Clarence Dietsch (1881–1961)
- Owen Ray Skelton (1886–1969)
- Gurnee Munn (1887–1960)
- Audrey Emery (1904–1971)
- Jack C. Massey (1904–1990)
- Paul Miller (1906–1991)
- Guilford Dudley (1907–2002)
- Alfonso Fanjul Sr. (1909–1980)
- John L. Hanigan (1914–1996)
- Adolphus Busch Orthwein (1917–2013)
- William Johnston Armfield (1934–2016)
