= John Ganson =

American politician (1818–1874)

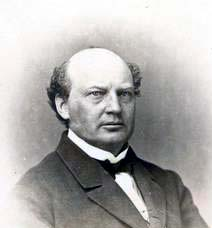
- Born: January 1, 1818; Le Roy, New York
- Died: September 28, 1874 (aged 56)
- Education: Le Roy Academy; Harvard University (1839)
- Occupations: Politician, lawyer
- Known for: U.S. Representative from New York from 1863 to 1865

John Ganson (January 1, 1818 – September 28, 1874) was an American lawyer and politician who served one term as a U.S. representative from New York from 1863 to 1865.

== Biography ==
Born in Le Roy, New York, Ganson attended the public schools and Le Roy Academy. He graduated from Harvard University in 1839 and subsequently studied law. He was admitted to the New York bar in 1846 and commenced practice in Canandaigua, New York. He moved to Buffalo the same year.

=== Political career ===
Ganson was a member of the New York State Senate (31st d.) in 1862 and 1863. He was then elected as a Democrat to the 38th United States Congress, holding office from March 4, 1863, to March 3, 1865. He was one of 14 House Democrats to vote in favor of the Thirteenth Amendment to the United States Constitution.

After leaving Congress, Ganson resumed the practice of law in Buffalo. Following the war, he was a director of a local railroad. He served as delegate to the 1864 Democratic National Convention.

Ganson was again a member of the State Senate in 1874.

=== Death ===
He died in Buffalo on September 28, 1874, and was buried at the Forest Lawn Cemetery.

== Sources ==
- United States Congress. "John Ganson (id: G000042)". Biographical Directory of the United States Congress.

New York State Senate
Preceded by Erastus S. Prosser	New York State Senate; 31st district 1862–1863	Succeeded by James M. Humphrey
Preceded by Loran L. Lewis	New York State Senate; 31st district 1874	Succeeded by Albert P. Laning
U.S. House of Representatives
Preceded by Augustus Frank	Member of the U.S. House of Representatives from New York's 30th congressional district 1863–1865	Succeeded by James M. Humphrey
