= Charles B. Benedict =

American politician (1828–1901)

Charles Brewster Benedict
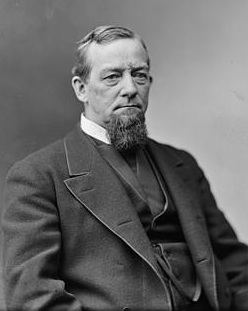

Member of the U.S. House of Representatives from New York's 31st district
- In office March 4, 1877 – March 3, 1879
- Preceded by: George G. Hoskins
- Succeeded by: Richard Crowley

Personal details
- Born: February 7, 1828 Attica, New York, U.S.
- Died: October 3, 1901 (aged 73) Attica, New York, U.S.
- Citizenship: United States
- Party: Democratic
- Spouse: Sophronia B. Matteson Benedict
- Children: Lewis Benedict; Helen Benedict; Frances S. Benedict; Clara Benedict; Charles Brewster Benedict
- Education: Oberlin College
- Profession: teacher; farmer; Attorney; politician; banker

Charles Brewster Benedict (February 7, 1828 – October 3, 1901) was an American lawyer and politician who served one term as a U.S. representative from New York from 1877 to 1879.

== Biography ==
Born in Attica, Wyoming County, New York, Benedict was the son of Thomas and Sarah Brewster Benedict. He attended the public schools and Oberlin College, Oberlin, Ohio. He married Sophronia B. Matteson on August 6, 1853 in Darien, New York, and they had five children, Lewis, Helen, Frances, Clara, and Charles.

== Career ==
Benedict taught school as well as engaged in agricultural pursuits. He studied law, and was admitted to the bar in 1856. He commenced practice in Attica, New York, and was the Justice of the Peace from 1854 to 1860. He organized and was president of the Attica National Bank, also Bank of Attica and the First National bank of Moorhead, Minnesota. His land holdings in Minnesota and North Dakota were very extensive.

A member of the board of supervisors of Wyoming County from 1869 to 1871 and from 1873 to 1875, Benedict served a part of the time as chairman. He served as member of the Democratic State committee in 1875.

Benedict was elected as a Democrat to the Forty-fifth Congress (March 4, 1877 – March 3, 1879). He was not a candidate for renomination in 1878, and resumed banking in Attica, New York.

== Death ==
Benecict died in Attica, Wyoming County, New York, on October 3, 1901 (age 73 years, 238 days). He is interred at Forest Hill Cemetery, Attica, New York.

U.S. House of Representatives
| Preceded by George G. Hoskins | Member of the U.S. House of Representatives from New York's 31st congressional district 1877–1879 | Succeeded by Richard Crowley |
