= Richard Crowley =

American politician

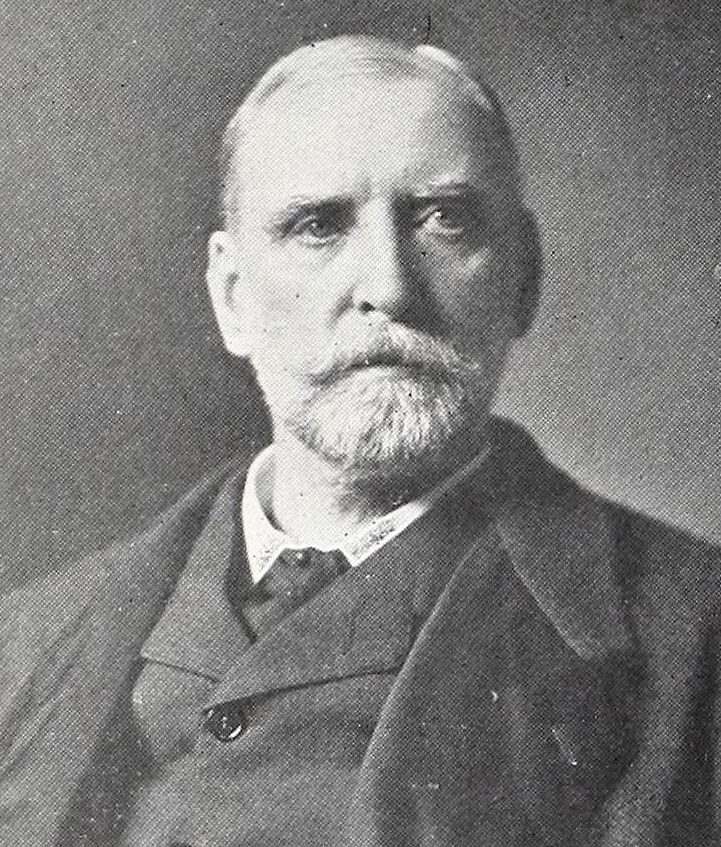
- From 1902's Souvenir History of Niagara County, New York

Chairman of the United States House Committee on Claims
- In office 1881–1883

Member of the U.S. House of Representatives from New York's 31st district
- In office March 4, 1879 – March 3, 1883
- Preceded by: Charles B. Benedict
- Succeeded by: Robert S. Stevens

United States Attorney for the Northern District of New York
- In office March 23, 1871 – March 3, 1879

New York State Senate (29th Dist.)
- In office 1866–1869

Personal details
- Born: December 14, 1836 Pendleton, New York, US
- Died: July 22, 1908 (aged 71) Olcott, New York, US
- Party: Republican

Richard Crowley (December 14, 1836 – July 22, 1908) was a United States representative from New York. He was born in Pendleton, New York. He attended the public schools and Lockport Union School. Later, he studied law, was admitted to the bar in 1860, and commenced practice in Lockport.

Crowley was City Attorney of Lockport from 1865 to 1866. He was admitted to practice before the Supreme Court of the United States in 1865, and was a member of the New York State Senate (29th D.) in 1866, 1867, 1868 and 1869. He was appointed by President Ulysses S. Grant as United States Attorney for the Northern District of New York on March 23, 1871 and was reappointed March 3, 1875, and served in that capacity until March 3, 1879.

Crowley was elected as a Republican to the 46th and 47th United States Congresses, holding office from March 4, 1879, to March 3, 1883. While in Congress, he was Chairman of the Committee on Claims (47th Congress). After leaving Congress, he resumed the practice of law in Lockport. He was appointed by Governor Levi P. Morton in 1896 as counsel for the State of New York in American Civil War claims cases, in which capacity he was serving at the time of his death at Olcott Beach, New York in 1908. He was buried in Lockport's Glenwood Cemetery.

New York State Senate
Preceded by Dan H. Cole	New York State Senate; 29th District; 1866–1869	Succeeded by George Bowen
U.S. House of Representatives
Preceded by Charles B. Benedict	Member of the U.S. House of Representatives from New York's 31st congressional district 1879–1883	Succeeded by Robert S. Stevens
