= Almanzor Hutchinson =

American politician

Almanzor Hutchinson (January 17, 1811 – June 12, 1893) was an American farmer and politician from New York.

== Life ==
Hutchinson was born in Remsen, Oneida County, New York, in 1811. In 1816, the family removed to a farm in Gaines, then in Genesee County, since 1824 in Orleans County, New York. In 1845, he married Mary G. Short (1821–1903), and they had several children.

He was a member of the New York State Assembly (Orleans Co.) in 1857, 1858 and 1859; and of the New York State Senate (29th D.) in 1862 and 1863.

He died at the age of 82 and was buried at the Mount Albion Cemetery in Albion.

== Sources ==
- The New York Civil List compiled by Franklin Benjamin Hough, Stephen C. Hutchins and Edgar Albert Werner (1870; pg. 443, 485, 487 and 489)
- Biographical Sketches of the State Officers and the Members of the Legislature of the State of New York in 1862 and '63 by William D. Murphy (1863; pg. 79ff)
- Mount Albion Cemetery records

New York State Assembly
Preceded by Dan H. Cole	New York State Assembly; Orleans County; 1857–1859	Succeeded by Abel Stilson
New York State Senate
Preceded by Peter P. Murphy	New York State Senate; 29th District; 1862–1863	Succeeded by Dan H. Cole
