= New York's 30th congressional district =

Former congressional district

- Obsolete district
- Created: 1820
- Eliminated: 2000
- Years active: 1823-2003

New York’s 30th congressional district was a congressional district for the United States House of Representatives in New York. It was eliminated as a result of the 2000 U.S. census. It was last represented by Jack Quinn who was redistricted into the 27th district.

The 30th congressional district is also referred to in the NBC television series Heroes, as the fictional district represented by Nathan Petrelli.

== Voting ==
Election results from presidential races
Year	Office	Results
1992	President	Clinton 45–26%
1996	President	Clinton 57–29%

== Past components ==
1993–2003:

Parts of Erie

1983–1993:

All of Genesee
Parts of Livingston, Monroe, Ontario

1973–1983:

All of Clinton, Franklin, Jefferson, Lewis, St. Lawrence
Parts of Essex, Oswego

1971–1973:

All of Rensselaer, Saratoga, Warren, Washington
Parts of Albany, Essex

1969–1971:

All of Essex, Fulton, Hamilton, Rensselaer, Saratoga, Warren, Washington

1963–1969:

All of Clinton, Essex, Fulton, Hamilton, Saratoga, Warren, Washington
Parts of Rensselaer

1953–1963:

All of Albany
Parts of Rensselaer

1945–1953:

All of Columbia, Dutchess, Greene, Schoharie, Ulster

1913–1945:

All of Fulton, Hamilton, Montgomery, Schenectady

1903–1913:

All of Broome, Chenango, Cortland, Tioga, Tompkins

1893–1903:

All of Genesee, Livingston, Niagara, Orleans, Wyoming

== List of members representing the district ==
Member	Party	Years	Cong ress	Electoral history
District established March 4, 1823
Albert H. Tracy (Buffalo)	D-R	March 4, 1823 – March 3, 1825	18th	Redistricted from the 22nd district and re-elected in 1822. Retired.
Daniel G. Garnsey (Fredonia)	Anti-Jacksonian	March 4, 1825 – March 3, 1829	19th 20th	Elected in 1824. Re-elected in 1826. Lost re-election as an independent supported by the Anti-Masonic Party.
Ebenezer F. Norton (Buffalo)	Jacksonian	March 4, 1829 – March 3, 1831	21st	Elected in 1828. [data missing]
Bates Cooke (Lewiston)	Anti-Masonic	March 4, 1831 – March 3, 1833	22nd	Elected in 1830. [data missing]
Philo C. Fuller (Geneseo)	Anti-Masonic	March 4, 1833 – March 3, 1835	23rd 24th	Elected in 1832. [data missing]
Philo C. Fuller (Geneseo)	Anti-Jacksonian	March 4, 1835 – September 2, 1836	23rd 24th	Re-elected in 1834. Resigned.
Vacant		September 3, 1836 – November 8, 1836	24th	[data missing]
John Young (Geneseo)	Whig	November 9, 1836 – March 3, 1837	24th	Elected to finish Fuller's term. [data missing]
Luther C. Peck (Pike)	Whig	March 4, 1837 – March 3, 1841	25th 26th	Elected in 1836. Re-elected in 1838. [data missing]
John Young (Geneseo)	Whig	March 4, 1841 – March 3, 1843	27th	Elected in 1840. [data missing]
William Spring Hubbell (Bath)	Democratic	March 4, 1843 – March 3, 1845	28th	Elected in 1842. [data missing]
Martin Grover (Angelica)	Democratic	March 4, 1845 – March 3, 1847	29th	Elected in 1844. [data missing]
David Rumsey (Bath)	Whig	March 4, 1847 – March 3, 1851	30th 31st	Elected in 1846. Re-elected in 1848. [data missing]
Reuben Robie (Bath)	Democratic	March 4, 1851 – March 3, 1853	32nd	Elected in 1850. [data missing]
Benjamin Pringle (Batavia)	Whig	March 4, 1853 – March 3, 1855	33rd 34th	Elected in 1852. [data missing]
Benjamin Pringle (Batavia)	Opposition	March 4, 1855 – March 3, 1857	33rd 34th	Re-elected in 1854. [data missing]
Judson W. Sherman (Angelica)	Republican	March 4, 1857 – March 3, 1859	35th	Elected in 1856. [data missing]
Augustus Frank (Warsaw)	Republican	March 4, 1859 – March 3, 1863	36th 37th	Elected in 1858. Re-elected in 1860. Redistricted to the 29th district.
John Ganson (Buffalo)	Democratic	March 4, 1863 – March 3, 1865	38th	Elected in 1862. [data missing]
James M. Humphrey (Buffalo)	Democratic	March 4, 1865 – March 3, 1869	39th 40th	Elected in 1864. Re-elected in 1866. [data missing]
David S. Bennett (Buffalo)	Republican	March 4, 1869 – March 3, 1871	41st	Elected in 1868. [data missing]
William Williams (Buffalo)	Democratic	March 4, 1871 – March 3, 1873	42nd	Elected in 1870. [data missing]
George G. Hoskins (Attica)	Republican	March 4, 1873 – March 3, 1875	43rd	Elected in 1872. Redistricted to the 31st district.
John M. Davy (Rochester)	Republican	March 4, 1875 – March 3, 1877	44th	Elected in 1874. [data missing]
Elizur K. Hart (Albion)	Democratic	March 4, 1877 – March 3, 1879	45th	Elected in 1876. [data missing]
John Van Voorhis (Rochester)	Republican	March 4, 1879 – March 3, 1883	46th 47th	Elected in 1878. Re-elected in 1880. [data missing]
Halbert S. Greenleaf (Rochester)	Democratic	March 4, 1883 – March 3, 1885	48th	Elected in 1882. [data missing]
Charles S. Baker (Rochester)	Republican	March 4, 1885 – March 3, 1891	49th 50th 51st	Elected in 1884. Re-elected in 1886. Re-elected in 1888. [data missing]
Halbert S. Greenleaf (Rochester)	Democratic	March 4, 1891 – March 3, 1893	52nd	Elected in 1890. [data missing]
James Wolcott Wadsworth (Geneseo)	Republican	March 4, 1893 – March 3, 1903	53rd 54th 55th 56th 57th	Redistricted from the 31st district and re-elected in 1892. Re-elected in 1894. Re-elected in 1896. Re-elected in 1898. Re-elected in 1900. Redistricted to the 34th district.
John W. Dwight (Dryden)	Republican	March 4, 1903 – March 3, 1913	58th 59th 60th 61st 62nd	Redistricted from the 26th district and re-elected in 1902. Re-elected in 1904. Re-elected in 1906. Re-elected in 1908. Re-elected in 1910. [data missing]
Samuel Wallin (Amsterdam)	Republican	March 4, 1913 – March 3, 1915	63rd	Elected in 1912. [data missing]
William B. Charles (Amsterdam)	Republican	March 4, 1915 – March 3, 1917	64th	Elected in 1914. [data missing]
George R. Lunn (Schenectady)	Democratic	March 4, 1917 – March 3, 1919	65th	Elected in 1916. [data missing]
Frank Crowther (Schenectady)	Republican	March 4, 1919 – January 3, 1943	66th 67th 68th 69th 70th 71st 72nd 73rd 74th 75th 76th 77th	Elected in 1918. Re-elected in 1920. Re-elected in 1922. Re-elected in 1924. Re-elected in 1926. Re-elected in 1928. Re-elected in 1930. Re-elected in 1932. Re-elected in 1934. Re-elected in 1936. Re-elected in 1938. Re-elected in 1940. [data missing]
Bernard W. Kearney (Gloversville)	Republican	January 3, 1943 – January 3, 1945	78th	Elected in 1942. Redistricted to the 31st district.
Jay LeFevre (New Paltz)	Republican	January 3, 1945 – January 3, 1951	79th 80th 81st	Redistricted from the 27th district and re-elected in 1944. Re-elected in 1946. Re-elected in 1948. [data missing]
J. Ernest Wharton (Richmondville)	Republican	January 3, 1951 – January 3, 1953	82nd	Elected in 1950. Redistricted to the 29th district.
Leo W. O'Brien (Albany)	Democratic	January 3, 1953 – January 3, 1963	83rd 84th 85th 86th 87th	Redistricted from the 32nd district and re-elected in 1952. Re-elected in 1954. Re-elected in 1956. Re-elected in 1958. Re-elected in 1960. Redistricted to the 29th district.
Carleton J. King (Saratoga Springs)	Republican	January 3, 1963 – January 3, 1973	88th 89th 90th 91st 92nd	Redistricted from the 31st district and re-elected in 1962. Re-elected in 1964. Re-elected in 1966. Re-elected in 1968. Re-elected in 1970. Redistricted to the 29th district.
Robert C. McEwen (Ogdensburg)	Republican	January 3, 1973 – January 3, 1981	93rd 94th 95th 96th	Redistricted from the 31st district and re-elected in 1972. Re-elected in 1974. Re-elected in 1976. Re-elected in 1978. [data missing]
David O'Brien Martin (Canton)	Republican	January 3, 1981 – January 3, 1983	97th	Elected in 1980. Redistricted to the 26th district.
Barber B. Conable Jr. (Alexander)	Republican	January 3, 1983 – January 3, 1985	98th	Redistricted from the 35th district and re-elected in 1982. [data missing]
Fred J. Eckert (Rochester)	Republican	January 3, 1985 – January 3, 1987	99th	Elected in 1984. [data missing]
Louise Slaughter (Fairport)	Democratic	January 3, 1987 – January 3, 1993	100th 101st 102nd	Elected in 1986. Re-elected in 1988. Re-elected in 1990. Redistricted to the 28th district.
Jack Quinn (Hamburg)	Republican	January 3, 1993 – January 3, 2003	103rd 104th 105th 106th 107th	Elected in 1992. Re-elected in 1994. Re-elected in 1996. Re-elected in 1998. Re-elected in 2000. Redistricted to the 27th district.
District dissolved January 3, 2003

== Election results ==
Note that in New York State electoral politics there are numerous minor parties at various points on the political spectrum. Certain parties will invariably endorse either the Republican or Democratic candidate for every office, hence the state electoral results contain both the party votes, and the final candidate votes (Listed as "Recap").

1996 US House election: District 30
Party	Candidate	Votes	%	±%
Republican	Jack Quinn (incumbent)	121,369	54.8%	
Democratic	Francis J. Pordum	100,040	45.2%	
Majority		21,329	9.6%	
Turnout		221,409	100%	

1998 US House election: District 30
Party	Candidate	Votes	%	±%
Republican	Jack Quinn (incumbent)	116,093	67.8%	+13.0%
Democratic	Crystal Peoples	55,199	32.2%	−13.0%
Majority		60,894	35.5%	+25.9%
Turnout		171,292	100%	−22.6%

2000 US House election: District 30
Party	Candidate	Votes	%	±%
Republican	Jack Quinn (incumbent)	138,452	67.1%	−0.7%
Democratic	John Fee	67,819	32.9%	+0.7%
Majority		70,633	34.2%	−1.3%
Turnout		206,271	100%	+20.4%
