= Henry C. Brewster =

American politician

Henry Colvin Brewster
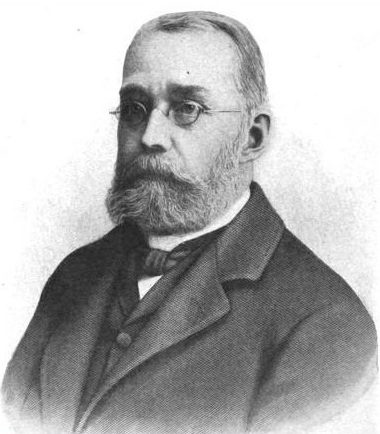

Member of the U.S. House of Representatives from New York's 31st district
- In office March 4, 1895 – March 3, 1899
- Preceded by: John Van Voorhis
- Succeeded by: James M. E. O'Grady

Personal details
- Born: September 7, 1845 Rochester, New York, U.S.
- Died: January 29, 1928 (aged 82) Canandaigua, New York, U.S.
- Party: Republican
- Spouse: Alice Elizabeth Chapin Brewster
- Children: William Colvin Brewster, Editha Colvin Brewster
- Profession: Banker, politician
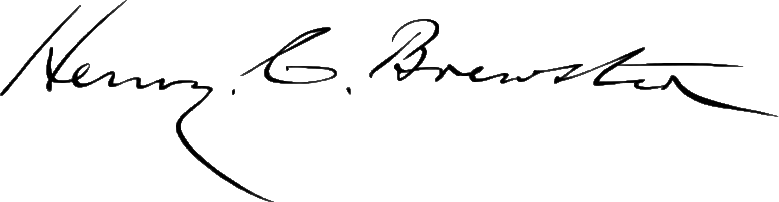
- Signature

Henry Colvin Brewster (September 7, 1845 – January 29, 1928) was an American politician and a U.S. Representative from New York.

== Early life ==
Born in Rochester, New York, Brewster was the son of Simon Latham and Editha Chloe Colvin Brewster. He attended the public schools, and married Alice Elizabeth Chapin on October 5, 1876.

== Career ==
A clerk in the Traders' National Bank in 1863, Brewster was employed as cashier from 1868 to 1894, then president from 1907 to 1917, and chairman of the board from 1917 to 1923.

Brewster served as vice president of the New York State League of Republican Clubs; president of the Monroe County League; and as president of the Rochester Chamber of Commerce in 1893 and 1902. He was one of the organizers of the New York State Bankers' Association, and served as vice president in 1894 and president in 1899.

Elected as a Republican to the Fifty-fourth and Fifty-fifth Congresses, Brewster was United States Representative for the thirty-first district of New York from March 4, 1895 to March 3, 1899. He served as chairman of the Committee on Alcoholic Liquor Traffic during the Fifty-fifth Congress. He was not a candidate for renomination in 1898.

Brewster was vice president of the National League of Republican Clubs in 1897, then resumed banking and other business activities. He served as delegate to the Republican National Convention in 1900, and retired in 1923.

When the Consolidated National Bank of New York was organized on July 1, 1902, the fourteen directors included individuals such as Brewster, John W. Griggs, George Crocker, Mortimer H. Wagar, and Perry Belmont.

== Death ==
Died in Canandaigua, New York, on January 29, 1928 (age 82 years, 144 days). He was interred in Mount Hope Cemetery, Rochester, New York.

== Notes ==
U.S. House of Representatives
Preceded by John Van Voorhis	Member of the U.S. House of Representatives from New York's 31st congressional district March 4, 1895 - March 3, 1899	Succeeded by James M. E. O'Grady
