= Perry Belmont House =

Historic house in Washington, D.C., United States

- U.S. National Register of Historic Places
- U.S. Historic district – Contributing property
- D.C. Inventory of Historic Sites
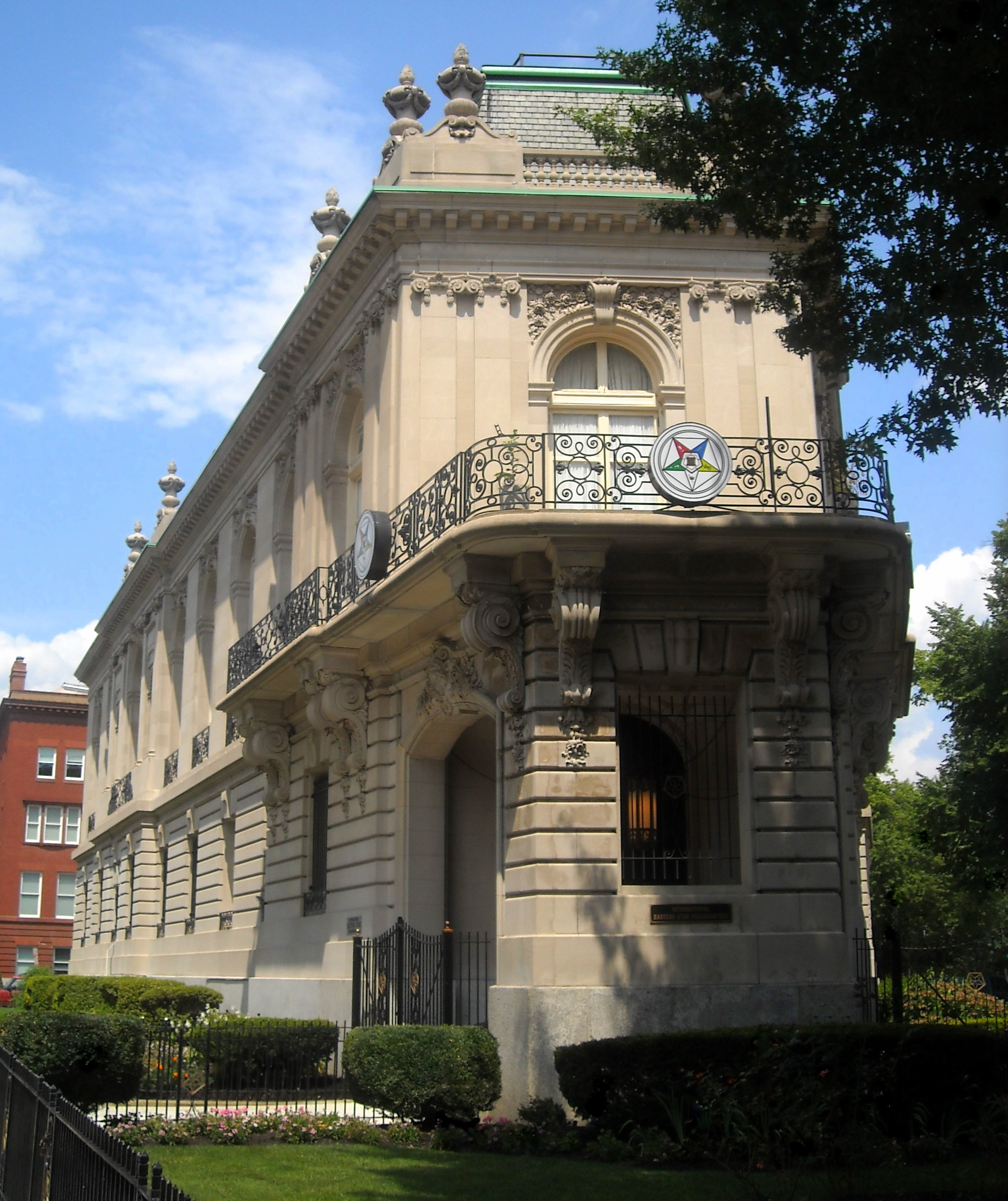
- Perry Belmont House in 2009

- Location within Washington, D.C. Location within the United States
- Location: 1618 New Hampshire Avenue, NW; Washington, D.C.
- Coordinates: 38°54′44″N 77°2′30″W
- Built: 1909
- Architect: Ernest-Paul Sanson
- Architectural style: Beaux-Arts
- Part of: Dupont Circle Historic District (ID78003056)
- NRHP reference No.: 73002074

Significant dates
- Added to NRHP: May 8, 1973
- Designated CP: July 21, 1978
- Designated DCIHS: November 8, 1964

The Perry Belmont House, or the Order of the Eastern Star International Headquarters, is the headquarters for the General Grand Chapter of the Order of the Eastern Star, one of several organizations affiliated with Freemasonry. The building is located at 1618 New Hampshire Avenue, Northwest in the Dupont Circle neighborhood of Washington, D.C.

The house takes the form of a free-standing pavilion in the French style, with a single story articulated with slender Ionic pilasters over a channel-rusticated basement. A balustrade with stone urns masks a discreet Mansard attic story. In the interiors, wrought-iron fixtures from France, wood from Germany, and marble from Italy are used.

The Belmont House is a designated contributing property in the Dupont Circle Historic District and was listed on the National Register of Historic Places on May 8, 1973. In 2009, the property value of the Belmont House was $7,475,100 (equivalent to $11.22 million in 2025).

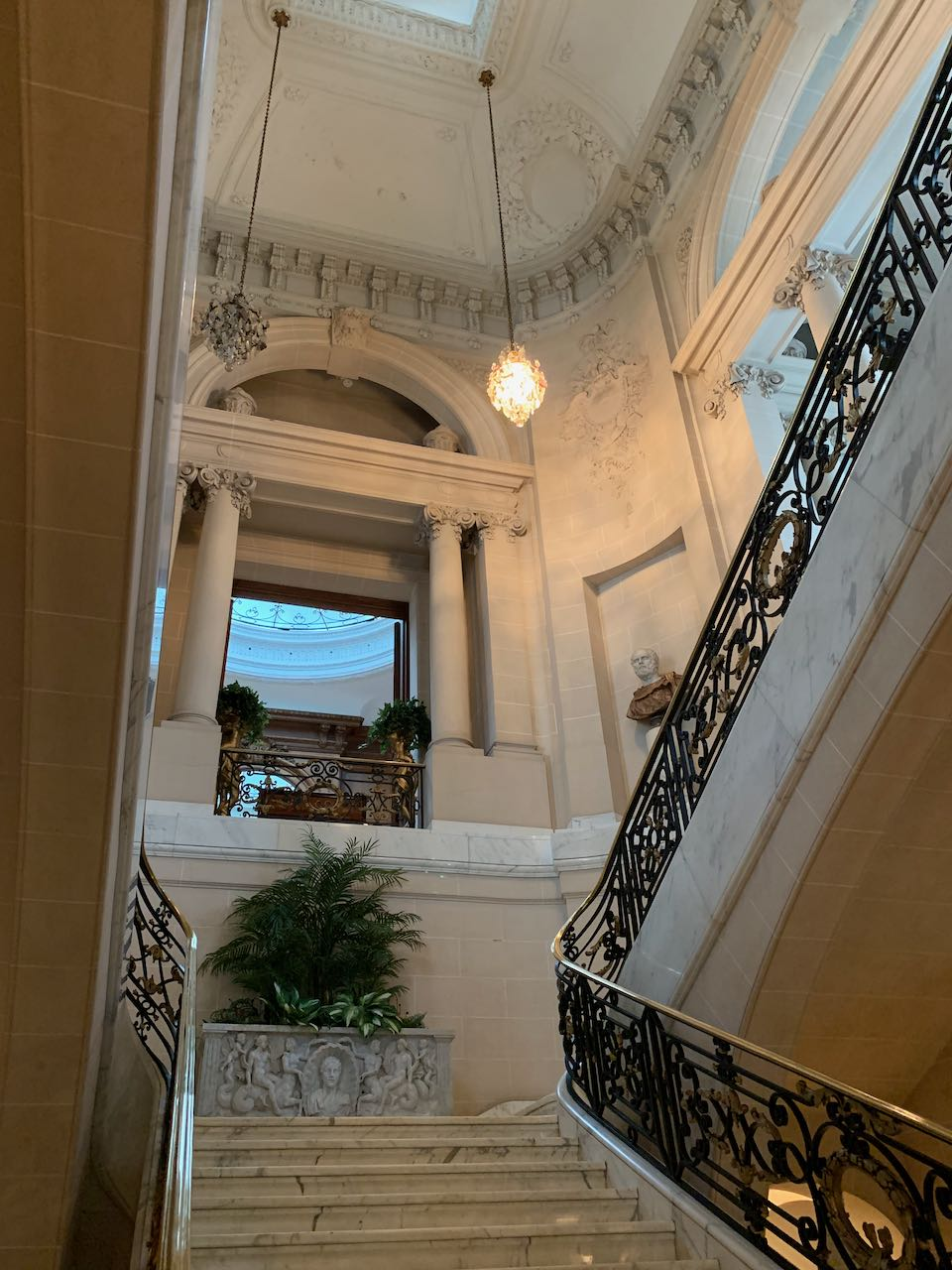
The grand stairway of the Perry Belmont House, leading to the main public rooms of the house.

== History ==
Perry Belmont, a politician, commissioned the French architect, Ernest-Paul Sanson, to design for him and his wife, the current Louis XVI Beaux-Arts mansion. Horace Trumbauer, an associate architect from Philadelphia, was in charge of the carrying out construction, which lasted from 1907 to 1909. The trapezoidal plot of land was purchased in 1906 for $90,000 (equivalent to $3.11 million in 2025), and construction cost $1.5 million (equivalent to $53.75 million in 2025).

During the Belmonts' time in D.C., Mr. and Mrs. Belmont would host lavish parties for the Washington elite. And in 1919, Edward, Prince of Wales, was a guest of the Belmonts (at President Woodrow Wilson's request); there, he conferred medals upon American soldiers whom the United Kingdom wished to honor for their service in World War I.

Beginning in the 1920's, the Belmonts increasingly spent time away from Washington, and the house was mothballed for nearly a decade. Perry Belmont then sold the building to the General Grand Chapter of the Order of the Eastern Star in 1935 for $100,000 (equivalent to $2.35 million in 2025), on the condition that the Right Worthy Grand Secretary would live in the building.

== Current usage ==
Since being acquired by General Grand Chapter, some of the space has been adaptively reused as offices for their Headquarters. However, most of the building's interior has been kept intact from Belmont's time; public tours can be made by appointment. Some items from the Belmont era, as well as furnishings acquired by General Grand Chapter, are on display. In the State Dining Room, five ceiling paintings depict the five heroines of the Order. There are 37 oil paintings and several Tiffany vases in the house. The Japanese fourfold teakwood screen was a gift from the Emperor of Japan to Perry Belmont.

== See also ==
- History of Washington, D.C.
- National Register of Historic Places listings in Washington, D.C.
