= William Williams (New York politician) =

American politician

Member of the U.S. House of Representatives from New York
- In office March 4, 1871 – March 3, 1873
- Preceded by: David S. Bennett
- Succeeded by: George Gilbert Hoskins
- Constituency: 30th district (1871–73)

Personal details
- Born: September 6, 1815 Bolton, Connecticut, U.S.
- Died: September 10, 1876 (aged 61) Buffalo, New York, U.S.
- Resting place: Forest Lawn Cemetery
- Party: Democratic Party
- Spouse: Lovisa Kirkland Stedman (m. 1838)
- Children: 3
- Profession: Banker; politician; railroad executive

William Williams (September 6, 1815 – September 10, 1876) was a U.S. representative from New York, member of the New York State Assembly, railroad executive, and banker.

== Early life ==
William Williams was born in Bolton, Connecticut, on September 6, 1815, to Sarah and Samuel Williams. He grew up and attended local schools in Bolton. At the age of 17, he moved to Georgia to work in a commercial business, but returned to Bolton after falling ill.

== Career ==
=== Banking career ===
He worked at a bank in Norwich, Connecticut, before moving to Windham where he served as a clerk in his uncle's bank, Bank of Windham. In 1838, he moved to Sandusky, Ohio, and worked as a cashier at the Bank of Sandusky. He and his wife then moved to Buffalo, New York, in 1839, where he was made a partner of a banking business owned by his uncle, George C. White, and started a branch called White and Williams (later renamed White's Bank of Buffalo). He remained as a clerk there for 12 years. In 1856, Williams and some friends founded the Clinton Bank of Buffalo.

=== Railroad executive and soldier ===
Williams was a financier, director, and president of the State Line Railroad Company, a railroad from Buffalo, New York to Erie, Pennsylvania, in the 1850s.

During the Civil War, he served under Millard Fillmore's command in the Union Continentals, a corps of home guards over the age of 45 from Upstate New York.

After the Civil War, in 1869, Williams while president of the Buffalo and Erie Railroad, helped organize its consolidation into the Lake Shore and Michigan Southern Railway. He was elected as the first vice president of the new corporation. He also served as the director of the Michigan Southern Railway, and in 1873, was elected director of the Buffalo, New York and Philadelphia Railroad Company.

=== Political and civic career ===
In 1841, Williams was elected Treasurer of Buffalo. He was elected to the Buffalo Common Council in 1845.

He was a member of the New York State Assembly in 1866 (Erie Co., 1st D.), and 1867 (Erie Co., 2nd D.).

Williams was elected as a Democrat to the Forty-second Congress (March 4, 1871 – March 3, 1873). He accepted the nomination on condition that Grover Cleveland, a lawyer in his personal attorney's office, was nominated as sheriff for Erie County, New York. He was an unsuccessful candidate for reelection in 1872 to the Forty-third Congress.

=== Later life ===
In 1874, he withdrew from public life and business due to his deteriorating health. He suffered financial losses during the Panic of 1873.

== Personal life ==
Williams met Lovisa Kirkland Stedman while living in Windham, Connecticut. They married on October 9, 1838. They had three children:

- Catherine Stedman Williams (1839–1841), who died young.
- Griffin Stedman Williams (1841–1911), who married Mary Pearce Harrison, a daughter of banker James Cooke Harrison and granddaughter of lawyer Jonas Harrison, in 1871.
- Charles Gordon Williams (1847–1895), who married Georgiana Metcalfe, daughter of George Metcalfe, in 1874.

He lived in retirement until his death at his home in Buffalo, New York, on September 10, 1876. He was interred in Forest Lawn Cemetery.

New York State Assembly
| Preceded by Walter W. Stanard | New York State Assembly; Erie County, 1st District; 1866 | Succeeded by Charles W. Hinson |
| Preceded by John L. C. Lewett | New York State Assembly; Erie County, 2nd District; 1867 | Succeeded by Richard Flach |
U.S. House of Representatives
| Preceded by David S. Bennett | Member of the U.S. House of Representatives from New York's 30th congressional district 1871–1873 | Succeeded by George G. Hoskins |
