= George Gilbert Hoskins =

American politician (1824–1893)

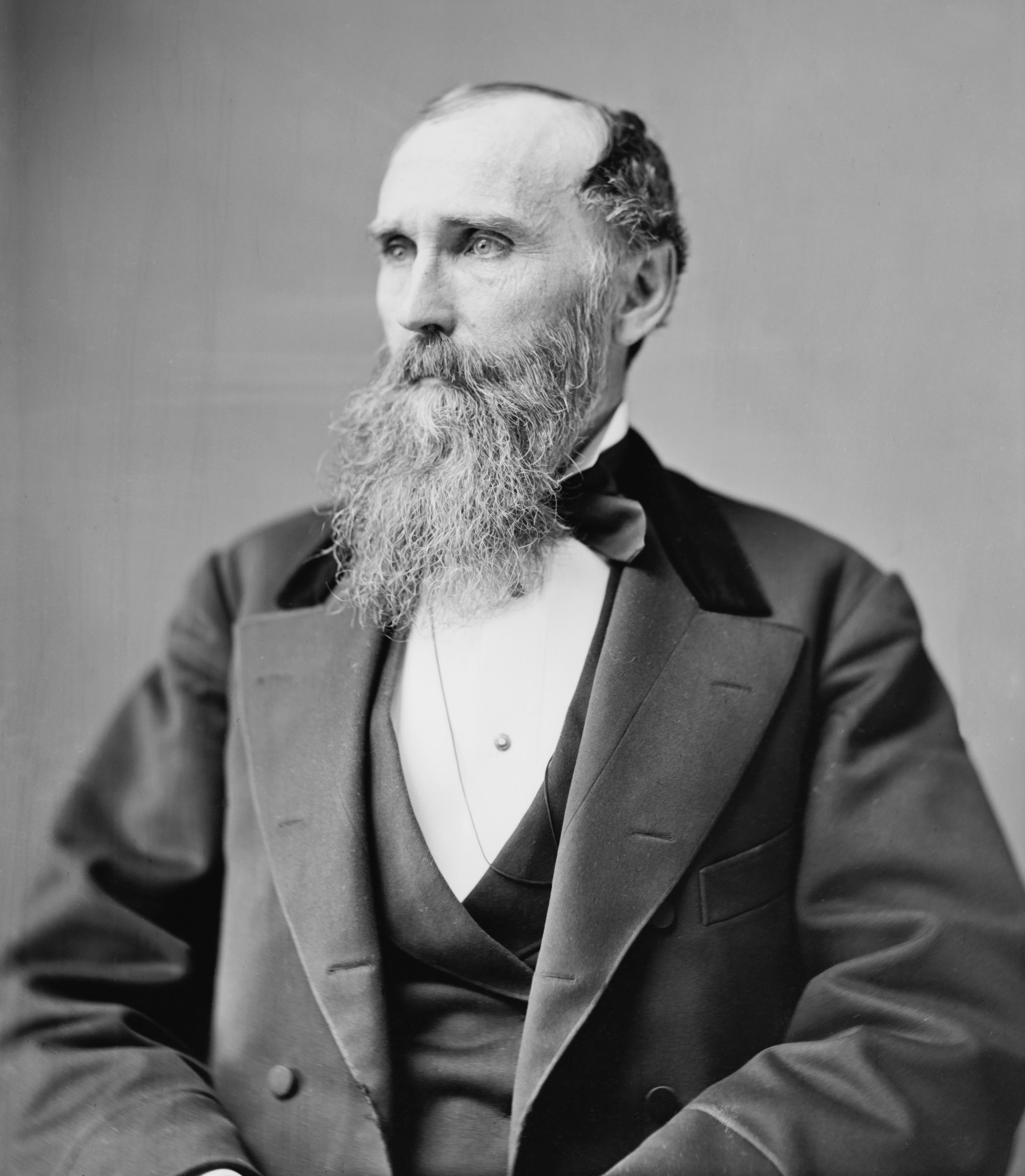
- Hoskins, 1865–1880

Member of the U.S. House of Representatives from New York
- In office March 4, 1873 – March 3, 1877
- Preceded by: William Williams
- Succeeded by: Charles B. Benedict
- Constituency: 30th district (1873–75); 31st district (1875–77)

Lieutenant Governor of New York
- In office January 1, 1880 – December 31, 1882
- Governor: Alonzo B. Cornell
- Preceded by: William Dorsheimer
- Succeeded by: David B. Hill

Member of the New York State Assembly from the Wyoming district
- In office January 1, 1865 – December 31, 1866
- Preceded by: Byron Healy
- Succeeded by: William Bristol
- In office January 1, 1860 – December 31, 1860
- Preceded by: Elias C. Holt
- Succeeded by: John J. Doolittle

Personal details
- Born: December 24, 1824 Bennington, New York, US
- Died: June 12, 1893 (aged 68) Attica, New York, US
- Resting place: Forest Hill Cemetery
- Party: Republican
- Spouse: Lois A. Hollenbeck Hoskins
- Profession: Merchant; Politician

George Gilbert Hoskins (December 24, 1824 – June 12, 1893) was an American politician who served as the lieutenant governor of New York and a United States representative for New York.

== Early life ==
Hoskins was born in Bennington, Wyoming County, New York. Raised on a farm, he attended the common schools and an academy, and at the age of seventeen, he began teaching school. When he was twenty-two, he engaged successfully in mercantile pursuits.

== Career ==
For a number of years he was town clerk of Bennington and justice of the peace, and was a member of the New York State Assembly (Wyoming Co.) in 1860, 1865 and 1866; Hoskins was Speaker in 1865. He was Postmaster of Bennington, NY, from 1849 to 1853 and from 1861 to 1866. In 1867, he moved to Attica, New York, where he was commissioner of public accounts from 1868 to 1870. On May 1, 1871, he was appointed as Collector of Internal Revenue for the 29th District of New York.

A Republican, Hoskins served as United States Representative from March 4, 1873, to March 3, 1875, for the 30th District of New York; and from March 4, 1875, to March 3, 1877, for the 31st District of New York. He was Lieutenant Governor of New York from 1880 to 1882, elected at the New York state election, 1879.

== Death ==
Hoskins died in Attica, New York, on June 12, 1893, at age 68. He is interred at the Forest Hill Cemetery in Attica, New York.

== Family life ==
In 1846 Hoskins married Lois A. Hollenbeck.

Political offices
Preceded by Thomas G. Alvord	Speaker of the New York State Assembly; 1865	Succeeded by Lyman Tremain
Preceded by William Dorsheimer	Lieutenant Governor of New York; 1880–1882	Succeeded by David B. Hill
U.S. House of Representatives
Preceded by William Williams	Member of the U.S. House of Representatives from New York's 30th congressional district 1873–1875	Succeeded by John M. Davy
Preceded by Lyman K. Bass	Member of the U.S. House of Representatives from New York's 31st congressional district 1875–1877	Succeeded by Charles B. Benedict
