= John M. Davy =

American politician

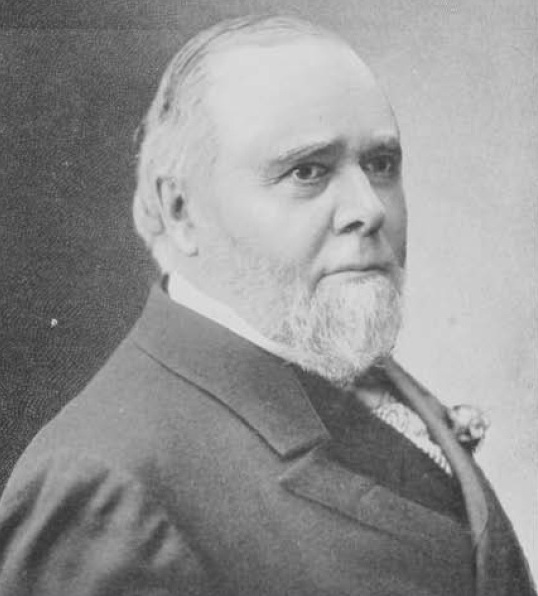

Justice for the New York Supreme Court
- In office 1889–1905

Member of the U.S. House of Representatives from New York's 30th district
- In office March 4, 1875 – March 3, 1877
- Preceded by: George Gilbert Hoskins
- Succeeded by: Elizur K. Hart

Collector of Customs for the Port of Genesee
- In office 1872–1875

District attorney for Monroe County
- In office 1868–1872

Personal details
- Born: June 29, 1835 Bytown, Upper Canada (now Ottawa, Ontario)
- Died: April 21, 1909 (aged 73) Atlantic City, New Jersey, US
- Party: Republican

Military service
- Allegiance: United States
- Branch/service: United States Army; Union Army
- Years of service: 1862–1863
- Rank: first lieutenant
- Unit: Company G, One Hundred and Eighth Regiment, Volunteer Infantry
- Battles/wars: American Civil War

John Madison Davy (June 29, 1835 – April 21, 1909) was a U.S. Representative from New York.

Born in Bytown in Upper Canada (now known as Ottawa, Ontario), Davy moved to New York with his parents, who settled near Rochester, Monroe County, in 1835. He attended the common schools and the Monroe Academy, East Henrietta, New York. He served in the Union Army during the Civil War as a first lieutenant in Company G, One Hundred and Eighth Regiment, Volunteer Infantry, in 1862 and 1863. He studied law in Rochester. He was admitted to the bar in 1863 and commenced practice in Rochester, New York. He served as district attorney of Monroe County 1868-1872. He served as collector of customs for the port of Genesee from 1872 until his resignation in 1875.

Davy was elected as a Republican to the Forty-fourth Congress (March 4, 1875 – March 3, 1877). He was an unsuccessful candidate for reelection in 1876 to the Forty-fifth Congress. He resumed the practice of law.

Davy was elected justice of the supreme court of New York and served from January 1, 1889, until his retirement in 1905. He again resumed the practice of law. He died in Atlantic City, New Jersey, April 21, 1909. He was interred in Mount Hope Cemetery, Rochester, New York.

U.S. House of Representatives
Preceded by George G. Hoskins	Member of the U.S. House of Representatives from New York's 30th congressional district 1875–1877	Succeeded by Elizur K. Hart
