= Dan H. Cole =

American politician

Dan Hyde Cole (June 16, 1811 Auburn, Cayuga County, New York – November 8, 1881) was an American lawyer and politician from New York.

== Life ==
He was the son of Dr. Joseph Cole and Sarah (Hyde) Cole. In 1830, he removed to Albion. There he studied law with his brother A. Hyde Cole (1798–1859), was admitted to the bar in 1832, and practiced in partnership with his brother. On May 4, 1836, he married Frances M. Elliott (1817–1893), and they had three children.

He was Surrogate of Orleans County from 1840 to 1844; Clerk of Orleans County from 1849 to 1854; and Judge and Surrogate of the Orleans County Court in 1855.

He was a member of the New York State Assembly (Orleans Co.) in 1856.

He was a member of the New York State Senate (29th D.) in 1864 and 1865.

He was again a member of the State Senate from 1874 to 1877, sitting in the 97th, 98th, 99th and 100th New York State Legislatures.

He was buried at the Mount Albion Cemetery in Albion.

== Sources ==
- The New York Civil List compiled by Franklin Benjamin Hough, Stephen C. Hutchins and Edgar Albert Werner (1870; pg. 266, 435, 443, 483, 546)
- Bio transcribed from Landmarks of Orleans County, New York, by Isaac C. Signor (Syracuse, NY, 1894), at On-line Biographies
- Mount Albion Cemetery records transcribed at RootsWeb

New York State Assembly
Preceded by Elisha S. Whalen	New York State Assembly; Orleans County; 1856	Succeeded by Almanzor Hutchinson
New York State Senate
Preceded by Almanzor Hutchinson	New York State Senate; 29th District; 1864–1865	Succeeded by Richard Crowley
Preceded by George Bowen	New York State Senate; 29th District; 1874–1877	Succeeded by Lewis S. Payne
