= James M. Humphrey =

American politician

James Humphrey
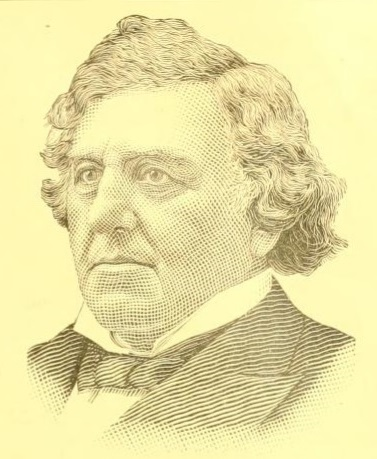

Member of the U.S. House of Representatives from New York's 30th district
- In office March 4, 1865 – March 3, 1869
- Preceded by: John Ganson
- Succeeded by: David S. Bennett

Personal details
- Born: James Morgan Humphrey; September 21, 1819 Holland, New York, United States
- Died: February 9, 1899 (aged 79) Buffalo, New York, United States
- Resting place: Forest Lawn Cemetery, Buffalo, New York
- Party: Democratic
- Occupation: Lawyer, judge, politician

James Morgan Humphrey (September 21, 1819 – February 9, 1899) was an American lawyer and politician who served two terms as a U.S. representative from New York from 1865 to 1869.

== Early life and education ==
Born in Holland, New York, Humphrey attended the common schools. Then he studied law, was admitted to the New York bar in 1847, and commenced practice in East Aurora.

== Political career ==
He was District Attorney of Erie County from January 1, 1857, to December 31, 1859, and a member of the New York State Senate (31st d.) in 1864 and 1865.

=== Congress ===
Humphrey was elected as a Democrat to the 39th and 40th congresses, holding office from March 4, 1865, to March 3, 1869.

== Later career and death ==
He was appointed to the Superior court of Buffalo, New York, in 1871 and served until January 1, 1873. Afterwards he resumed the practice of law until 1894, when he retired.

He died in Buffalo, New York, on February 9, 1899, and was buried at the Forest Lawn Cemetery.

== Sources ==
- United States Congress. "James M. Humphrey (id: H000955)". Biographical Directory of the United States Congress.

New York State Senate
Preceded by John Ganson	New York State Senate; 31st district 1864–1865	Succeeded by David S. Bennett
U.S. House of Representatives
Preceded by John Ganson	Member of the U.S. House of Representatives from New York's 30th congressional district 1865–1869	Succeeded by David S. Bennett
