= Elizur K. Hart =

American politician

E. Kirke Hart
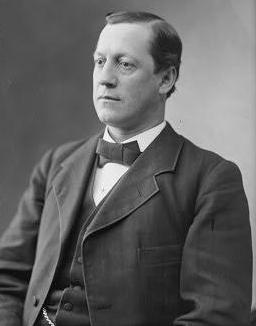
- Elizur Kirke Hart, Congressman from New York

Member of the U.S. House of Representatives from New York's 30th district
- In office March 4, 1877 - March 4, 1879
- Preceded by: John M. Davy
- Succeeded by: John Van Voorhis

Member of the New York State Assembly from the Orleans district
- In office January 2, 1872 - May 14, 1872
- Preceded by: John Berry
- Succeeded by: Elisha S. Whalen

Personal details
- Born: April 8, 1841 Albion, New York, U.S.
- Died: February 18, 1893 (aged 51) Albion, New York, U.S.
- Party: Republican (1872); Democrat (1873-1893)
- Spouse: Louisa E. Sanderson
- Children: Charles Elizur Hart; Emma Brown Hart; Loraine Field Hart; Mary Ann Hart; Elizur Kirke Hart, Jr. Louise Sanderson Hart
- Profession: Banker, politician

Elizur Kirke Hart (April 8, 1841 – February 18, 1893) was an American banker and politician who served one term as a U.S. representative from New York from 1877 to 1879.

== Biography ==
Born in Albion, New York, to Elizur Hart and Loraine Field, Hart attended the Albion Academy. Hart's father was a prominent member of the community, establishing the Orleans County Bank in 1860 with a capital of $100,000. Elizur K. Hart was first employed as a bookkeeper until the bank was reorganized as the Orleans County National Bank in 1865. He was then promoted to teller and eventually cashier upon the death of his father in 1870. Following the death of Joseph Cornell in 1890, Elizur assumed the position of bank president, serving in that capacity until his death in 1893.

He served as member of the 95th New York State Legislature (1872) as a Republican. During the presidential campaign of Horace Greeley, Hart found himself attracted to liberal ideas and became associated with the Democratic Party.

=== Tenure in Congress ===
Hart was elected as a Democrat to the Forty-fifth Congress (March 4, 1877 – March 3, 1879), but did not seek reelection in 1878.

=== Later career ===
Upon his return to Albion, Hart served as a member of the Village of Albion Board of Trustees (1879 - 1886), a member of the Albion Board of Education, and one of the first trustees of the Albion Library Association. Founder and president of the Rochester (New York) Post-Express in 1882, he was a principal stockholder in that company until 1892.

Hart was responsible for securing Albion as the location of the Western House of Refuge, serving as president of the institution's board of directors. He was also selected as the treasurer of the Albion Electric Light Company, established in 1890 and responsible for bringing electric street lights to the Village of Albion.

As a philanthropist, Hart was a charter member of the Orleans County Monument Association, which was responsible for raising the funds to erect the Soldiers and Sailors Monument at Mount Albion Cemetery.

Hart purchased Hemlock Island in the Thousand Islands from Charles and John Walton for $100 on July 31, 1871. Renaming the island "Hart Island," he constructed an 80-room cottage, 84 feet long and 74 feet wide at a cost of $12,000. Eventually the island was sold to George C. Boldt, who relocated the cottage to Wellesley Island, renamed the island "Heart Island," and constructed Boldt Castle upon the site.

=== Death ===
He died in Albion, New York, February 18, 1893 and was interred in Mount Albion Cemetery.

New York State Assembly
Preceded by John Berry	New York State Assembly; Orleans County; 1872	Succeeded by Elisha S. Whalen
U.S. House of Representatives
Preceded by John M. Davy	Member of the U.S. House of Representatives from New York's 30th congressional district 1877–1879	Succeeded by John Van Voorhis
