= George Crocker (businessman) =

American businessman (1856–1909)

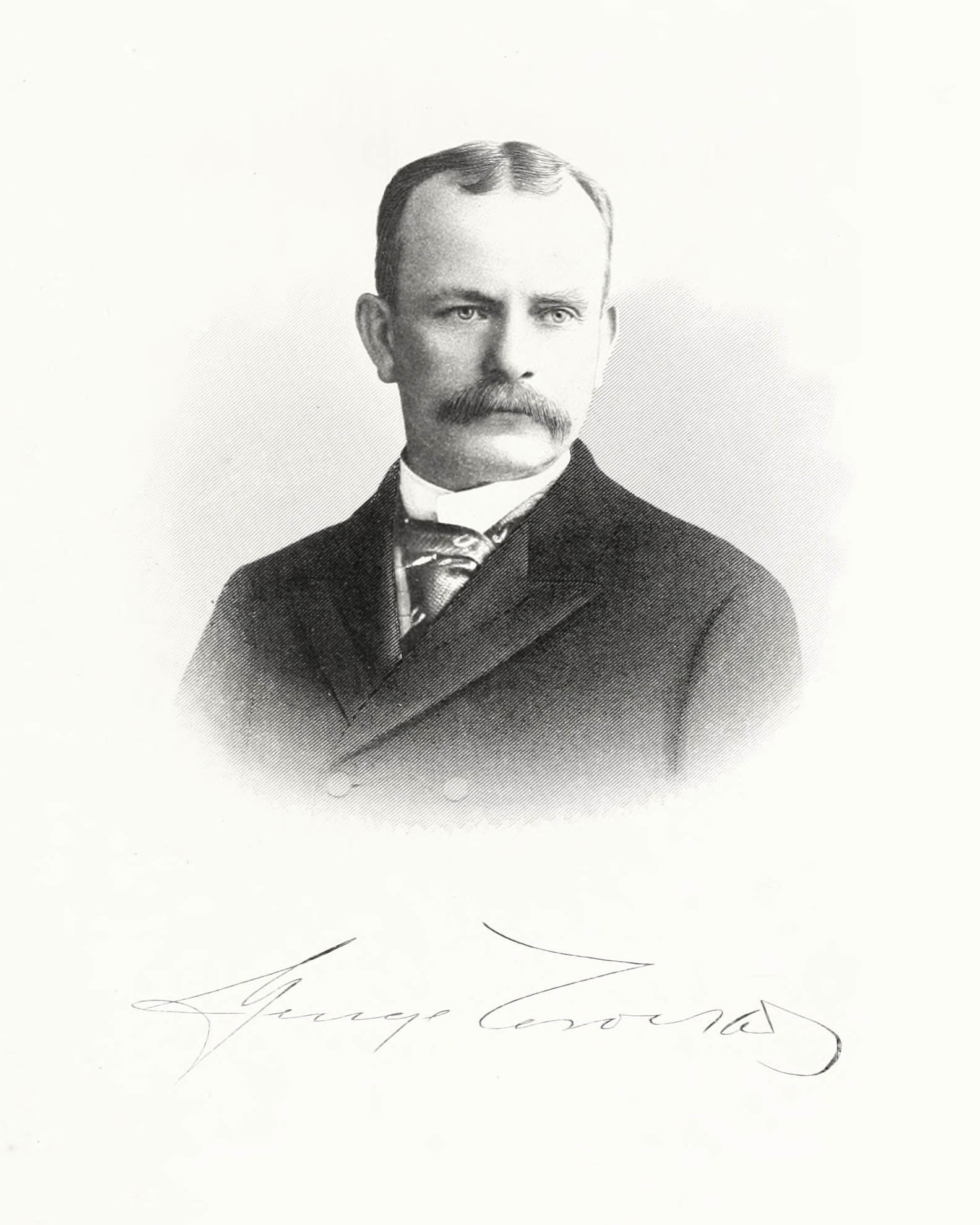
- Crocker in 1904
- Born: February 10, 1856; Sacramento, California, US
- Died: December 4, 1909 (aged 53); New York City, US
- Resting place: Mountain View Cemetery, Oakland, California, US
- Occupation: Businessman
- Spouse: Emma Rutherford
- Parent: Charles Crocker
- Relatives: William H. Crocker (brother); Charles F. Crocker (brother)

George Crocker (February 10, 1856 – December 4, 1909) was an American businessman and a member of the wealthy Crocker family. A member of Tuller & Co., he was also a director of several corporations, including Trust Company of America. He was second vice president of the Southern Pacific Railroad. In 1909, Crocker was valued between $10 million to $20 million. The 75-room, three-story Crocker Mansion was built in 1907 for Crocker in Mahwah, New Jersey, and is one of New Jersey's historical landmarks.

== Early life ==
He was born on February 10, 1856, in Sacramento, California, the second of four children of the railway magnate Charles Crocker. His three siblings were William Henry Crocker, Harriet Crocker Alexander, and Charles Frederick Crocker.

Following his father's death in 1888, an estate was left of $30,000,000. George was willed $6 million on the condition that, "after the space of five years continuously he shall abstain from the use of spirituous, vinous, and malt liquors to the extent that he shall not during this period have been intoxicated." Crocker continued his life in San Francisco as "one of the most reckless young men about town when reckless young men thereabouts were common" for three more years. He then began his probation and entered a sanatorium.

== Career ==
Three years after his father's death, Crocker notified his brothers, who were the trustees of his share, that his abstinence had begun. After his time at a sanitorium, Crocker purchased a 375 acre ranch near Promontory, Utah, that was not profitable. He worked on the ranch until his probation was completed, turning it into a successful concern. He then came into his inheritance. After applying for bonds in his name through the courts in September 1898, on October 27, 1898, he was awarded $500,000 for five years of total abstinence from intoxicants. After he returned from Europe on his honeymoon, his brothers turned over $6 million to him.

Afterwards, he opened an office in New York City after moving there. He went into business, with his main endeavor involving the operations and expansion of businesses his father had invested in, including land, railroad, banks, coal, gas, iron, sugar, and chemical companies. He was successful as a businessperson, and was listed in Who's Who in America. A member of Tuller & Co. and Tailer and Company, banking houses, he was also a director of several corporations, including Trust Company of America. At Southern Pacific Railroad, he was second vice president. When the Consolidated National Bank was organized in New York City on July 1, 1902, the fourteen directors included Crocker, Mortimer Wagar, John W. Griggs, Henry C. Brewster, and Perry Belmont.

Following his 1906 expedition that failed to reach the North Pole, Robert E. Peary reported in his book that he had sighted distant land from the heights of the northwestern coast of Ellesmere Island. He named it Crocker Land after San Francisco banker George Crocker, one of his financial backers. It is now known that Peary's report was a hoax, as he wrote in his diary at the time that no land was visible. At the time, an expedition (Crocker Land Expedition) was organized, and ultimately failed. In 1909, Crocker was valued between $10 million to $20 million.

== Club memberships ==
George was active in sports in New York. He was involved in clubs such as the New York Athletic Club, the Midday, City, Metropolitan, and the Tuxedo Union League,.

== Personal life and death ==
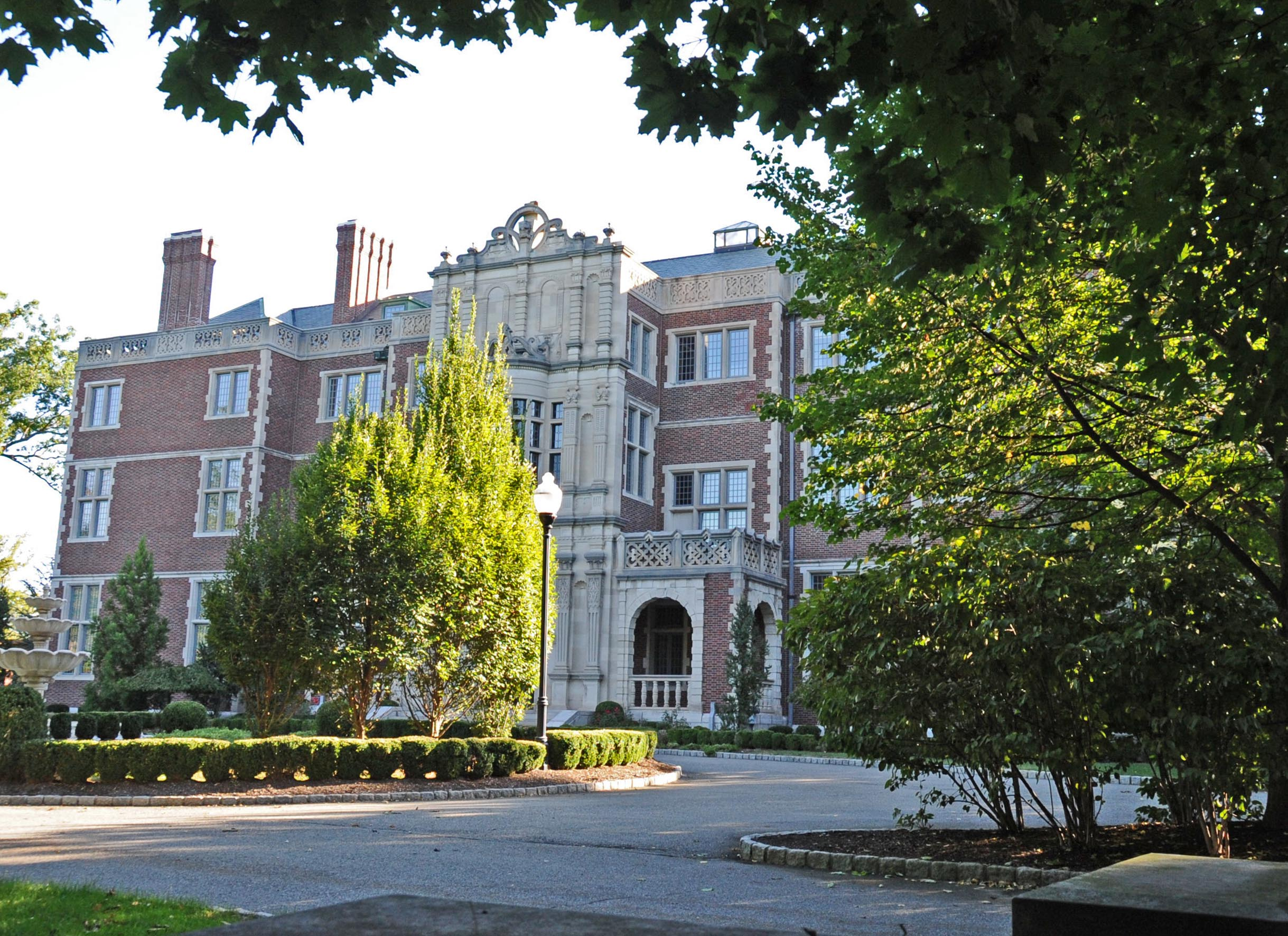
George Crocker built the 75-room Crocker Mansion from 1901 to 1907 in New Jersey. In 1997 the mansion was placed on the National Register of Historic Places.

Shortly after moving to New York City, in 1894 he married Emma Rutherford, a widow from California with three grown children. They afterwards set out on a wedding trip to Europe. Mrs. Crocker became known as a hostess in New York, holding lavish events at their villa in Newport and their 1 East 64th Street townhouse in New York. In 1901, the couple began working on the construction of a new mansion in New Jersey, after purchasing the Darling estate. Utilizing the old Darling home as his own during the building process, he commissioned the architect James Brite to build a 75-room, 45,000 square feet house modeled on Bramshill House, a Jacobean mansion in England. The estimated cost was $2,000,000 ($70 million when adjusted for current inflation).

His wife Emma was a member of the St. Thomas Episcopal Church in Manhattan. She died from stomach cancer in July 1904 in Newport. In her memory, he provided $10,000 for the construction of a church in Ramsey, New Jersey, the Protestant Episcopal Mission of St. John. After completing plans for the church, in March 1905 he sailed for Europe on the White Star liner Cedric for a six weeks trip. Until June 1906, George Crocker worked on building the small church dedicated to his wife.

In 1907 he learned that he had stomach cancer as well. On June 24, 1908, Dr. Sam Lambert operated on Crocker, realizing in the process survival was improbable. On July 4, 1909, Crocker arranged for a large fireworks displays with rockets and some 20,000 firecrackers in the Ramapo hills. He returned from Ramsey to New York in September 1909. In November 1909, the Times reported that Crocker had but weeks to live and was in intense pain, and that his brother William had hurried home from Europe. He had a second operation with William T. Bull for the hopes of obtaining pain relief, and died on December 4, 1909 at his home at 1 East Sixty-fourth Street with family members. He was about 54 years old. With the funeral at St. Thomas's Episcopal Church at 5th Avenue and 53rd Street, he was buried with his wife and parents at the Mountain View Cemetery, Oakland, California.

Crocker's Darlington and New York City houses as well as parts of his art collection were sold after his death. Darlington was sold to the banker Emerson McMillin, who lived in the estate until his death in 1922. The George Crocker Special Research Fund at Columbia University for cancer research received the monies earned from the sale of the houses.

== See also ==
- Crocker National Bank
- List of largest houses in the United States
- 834 Fifth Avenue
