= Elisha S. Whalen =

American politician

Elisha Stone Whalen (March 24, 1817 – September 7, 1889) was an American businessman and politician from New York.

== Life ==
Whalen was born on March 24, 1817, in Milton, New York, the son of Abel Whalen Jr. and Rebecca Van Ostrand.

When Whalen was 13, he began working as a clerk in a country store in Rock City Falls for two years. He then worked as a clerk in West Milton. In 1836, he moved to western New York and spent the winter with his father's family in Monroe County. In 1837, he moved to Medina and secured a job in a prominent firm. Within two months, he was promoted to bookkeeper and confidential clerk. He then became active in business, working in merchandising, merchant, milling, and produce dealing from 1841 until his retirement for health reasons in 1872. He was a director of the Union Bank of Medina and an original director of the Niagara River and New York Air Line Railroad. He also worked in the produce and commission business with A. M. Ives.

Whalen was initially a Democrat. He served as town supervisor from 1851 to 1852 and again from 1871 to 1872, serving as chairman of the board in 1872. In 1854, he was elected to the New York State Assembly as a member of the American Party in a special election to replace the deceased Alexis Ward. He served in the Assembly in 1855. He then joined the Republican Party and was a Presidential elector for Abraham Lincoln in the 1860 presidential election. In 1872, he was elected back to the New York State Assembly as a Republican, representing Orleans County. He served in the Assembly in 1873 and 1874.

Whalen was a member, trustee, and district steward of the Methodist Episcopal Church. In 1844, he married Catharine Groff. They had a daughter, Ida.

Whalen died at home on September 7, 1889. He was buried in Boxwood Cemetery in Medina.

New York State Assembly
Preceded by Jeremiah Freeman	New York State Assembly; Orleans County; 1855	Succeeded by Dan H. Cole
Preceded by Elizur K. Hart	New York State Assembly; Orleans County; 1873–1874	Succeeded by John N. Wetherbee
