= David S. Bennett =

American politician

David Smith Bennett
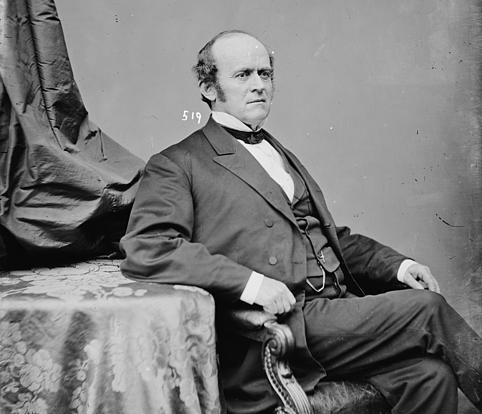

Member of the U.S. House of Representatives from New York's 30th district
- In office March 4, 1869 – March 3, 1871
- Preceded by: James M. Humphrey
- Succeeded by: William Williams

Member of the New York Senate from the 32nd district
- In office January 1, 1866 – December 31, 1867
- Preceded by: James M. Humphrey
- Succeeded by: Asher P. Nichols

Personal details
- Born: May 3, 1811 Camillus, New York, United States
- Died: November 6, 1894 (aged 83) Buffalo, New York, United States
- Party: Republican
- Spouse: Harriet Amanda Benham Bennett
- Profession: Farmer; Grain elevator operator; Politician

David Smith Bennett (May 3, 1811 – November 6, 1894) was an American politician and a U.S. representative from New York.

== Biography ==
Born on a farm near Camillus, New York, Bennett was the son of James B. and Sarah Olmstead Bennett and attended the common schools and the local academy in Onondaga. He married Harriet Amanda Benham.

== Career ==
Bennett engaged in agricultural pursuits and later moved to Syracuse. From there he extended his business to New York City. In 1853, Bennett moved to Buffalo, where he built and operated several grain elevators.

A member of the New York State Senate, Bennett was State Senator for the (31st District) in the 89th New York State Legislature in 1866 and the 90th New York State Legislature in 1867.

As a Republican, Bennett was elected to the forty-first United States Congress, as a U. S. Representative for the thirtieth district of New York, holding office from March 4, 1869, to March 3, 1871.

After declining to run for renomination in 1870, Bennett resumed his former business pursuits in Buffalo, New York.

== Death ==
Bennett died in Buffalo, Erie County, New York, on November 6, 1894 (age 83 years, 187 days). He is interred at Oakwood Cemetery, Syracuse, New York.

New York State Senate
| Preceded by James M. Humphrey | New York State Senate; 32nd District; 1866–1867 | Succeeded by Asher P. Nichols |
U.S. House of Representatives
| Preceded by James M. Humphrey | Member of the U.S. House of Representatives from New York's 30th congressional district March 4, 1869 – March 3, 1871 | Succeeded by William Williams |
