= John Van Voorhis =

American politician

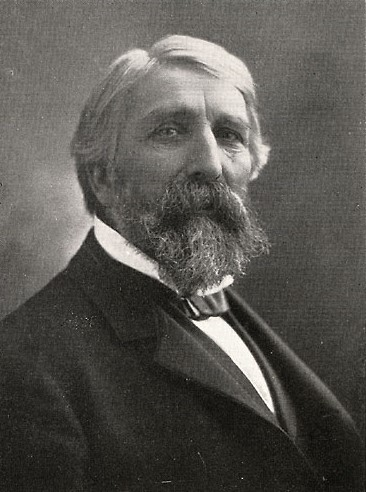
- Van Voorhis c. 1903

Member of the U.S. House of Representatives from New York
- In office March 4, 1879 – March 3, 1883
- Preceded by: Elizur K. Hart
- Succeeded by: Halbert S. Greenleaf
- Constituency: 30th district
- In office March 4, 1893 – March 3, 1895
- Preceded by: James Wolcott Wadsworth
- Succeeded by: Henry C. Brewster
- Constituency: 31st district

Personal details
- Born: October 22, 1826 Decatur, New York, U.S.
- Died: October 20, 1905 (aged 78) Rochester, New York, U.S.
- Spouse: Frances Artistine Galusha
- Children: Eugene; Charles; Arthur; Norman; Louise; Marguerite
- Parent: John Van Voorhis
- Relatives: John Van Voorhis (grandson, through son, Eugene)
- Occupation: Lawyer and politician
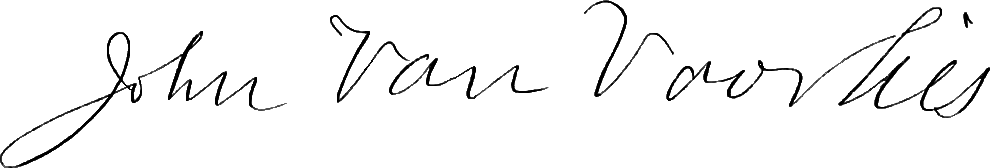
- Signature

John Van Voorhis (October 22, 1826 – October 20, 1905) was an American lawyer and politician from New York.

== Early life ==
Van Voorhis was born in 1826 in Decatur, New York. His family moved several times before settling in the town of Mendon. He studied law, was admitted to the bar in December 1851, and commenced practice in Elmira, New York in the spring of 1853. He soon chose to relocate to Rochester, New York and opened his own practice on July 4, 1854, where he was eventually joined by his brother Quincy and sons Eugene and Charles.

== Career ==
Van Voorhis was a member of the Board of Education in 1857 and was City Attorney of Rochester in 1859. He was appointed Collector of Internal Revenue for the 28th District of New York and held that office from September 1, 1862, to March 31, 1863. He was a delegate to the 1864 Republican National Convention.

In 1873, Van Voorhis joined the legal defense of Susan B. Anthony during her trial for voting in the 1872 elections, working alongside Henry Selden. Other notable clients of his included Martha Matilda Harper, who opened her first salon with his help in 1888, and Frederick Douglass. Van Voorhis was an honorary pall-bearer at Douglass' funeral in 1895 and contributed to a monument erected in his honor in 1899.

Van Voorhis was elected as a Republican to the 46th and 47th United States Congresses, holding office from March 4, 1879, to March 3, 1883. He was Chairman of the Committee on Mines and Mining (47th Congress). During his time in Congress, he urged the construction of a federal building in Rochester. His efforts were successful and the Rochester federal building (today the city hall) was built. In between terms he resumed the practice of law in Rochester. He was again elected to the 53rd United States Congress, holding office from March 4, 1893, to March 3, 1895. In 1895, Van Voorhis made a strong defense of the Seneca Nation against a claim that the defunct Ogden Land Company held title over the Allegany and Cattaraugus Reservations, and opposed a provision for Congress to pay the company's shareholders $300,000 for the land. The version of the bill containing the provision was defeated in the House, and the Senecas prevailed in retaining their land.

After leaving Congress, he again resumed the practice of law.

== Personal life ==
Van Voorhis married Frances Artistine Galusha, a Rochester native, in 1854. Through his son Eugene, a lawyer in Rochester, NY, his grandson was Judge John Van Voorhis, of the New York Court of Appeals. The Judge's son was also named Eugene, (Hotchkiss 1951, Yale '55, Yale Law ‘58).

He was buried at the Mount Hope Cemetery, Rochester.

== See also ==
- Henry Clay Van Voorhis
- Charles Henry Voorhis

U.S. House of Representatives
Preceded by Elizur K. Hart	Member of the U.S. House of Representatives from New York's 30th congressional district 1879 - 1883	Succeeded by Halbert S. Greenleaf
Preceded by James Wolcott Wadsworth	Member of the U.S. House of Representatives from New York's 31st congressional district 1893 - 1895	Succeeded by Henry C. Brewster
