= Perry Belmont =

American politician and diplomat

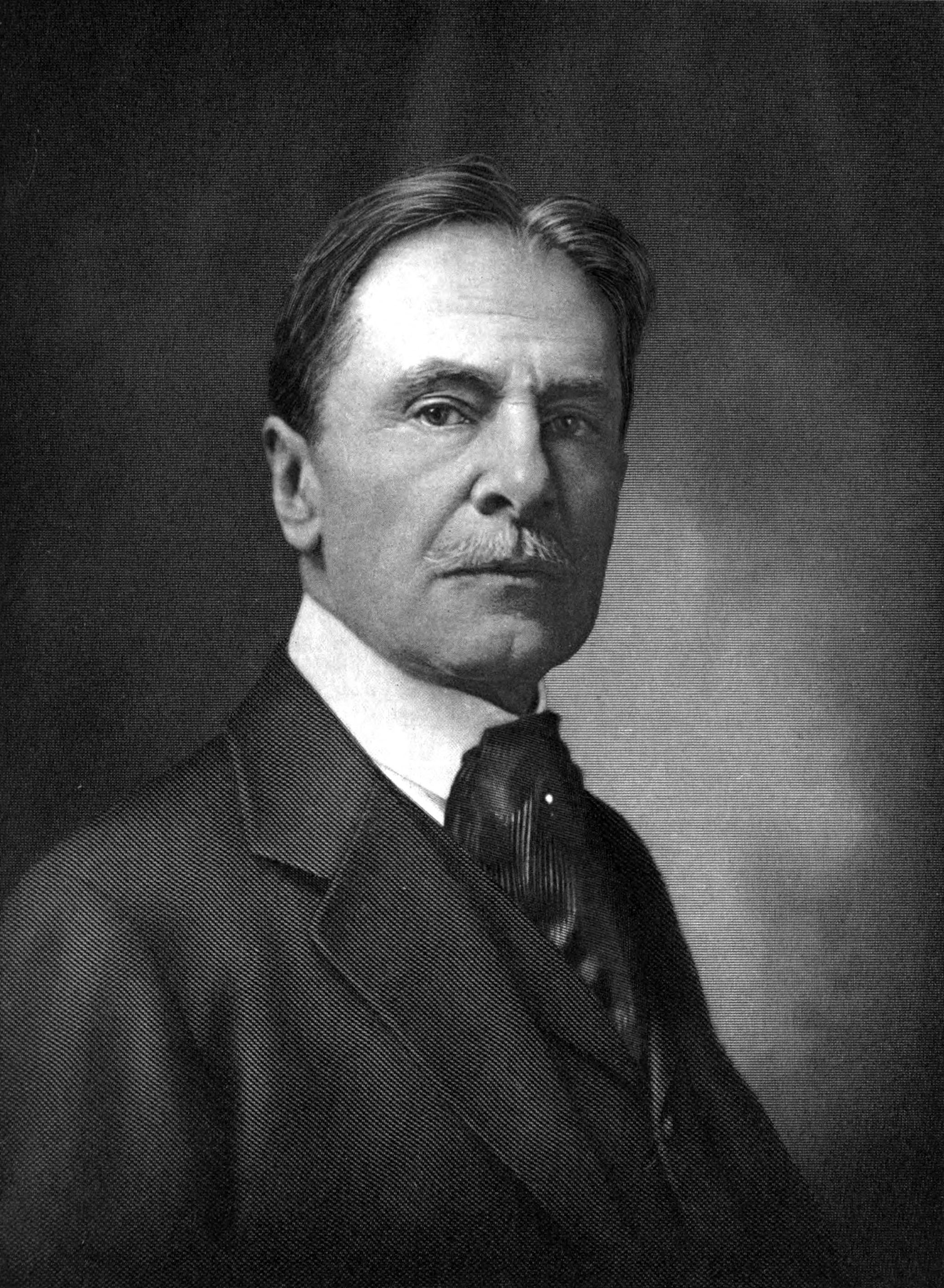
- Belmont c. 1918

Member of the U.S. House of Representatives from New York's 1st district
- In office March 4, 1881 – December 1, 1888
- Preceded by: James W. Covert
- Succeeded by: James W. Covert

26th United States Envoy Extraordinary and Minister Plenipotentiary to Spain
- In office November 17, 1888 – May 1, 1889
- President: Grover Cleveland; Benjamin Harrison
- Preceded by: Jabez L.M. Curry
- Succeeded by: Thomas W. Palmer

Personal details
- Born: December 28, 1851 New York City, New York, U.S.
- Died: May 25, 1947 (aged 95) Newport, Rhode Island, U.S.
- Resting place: Island Cemetery, Newport, Rhode Island
- Party: Democratic
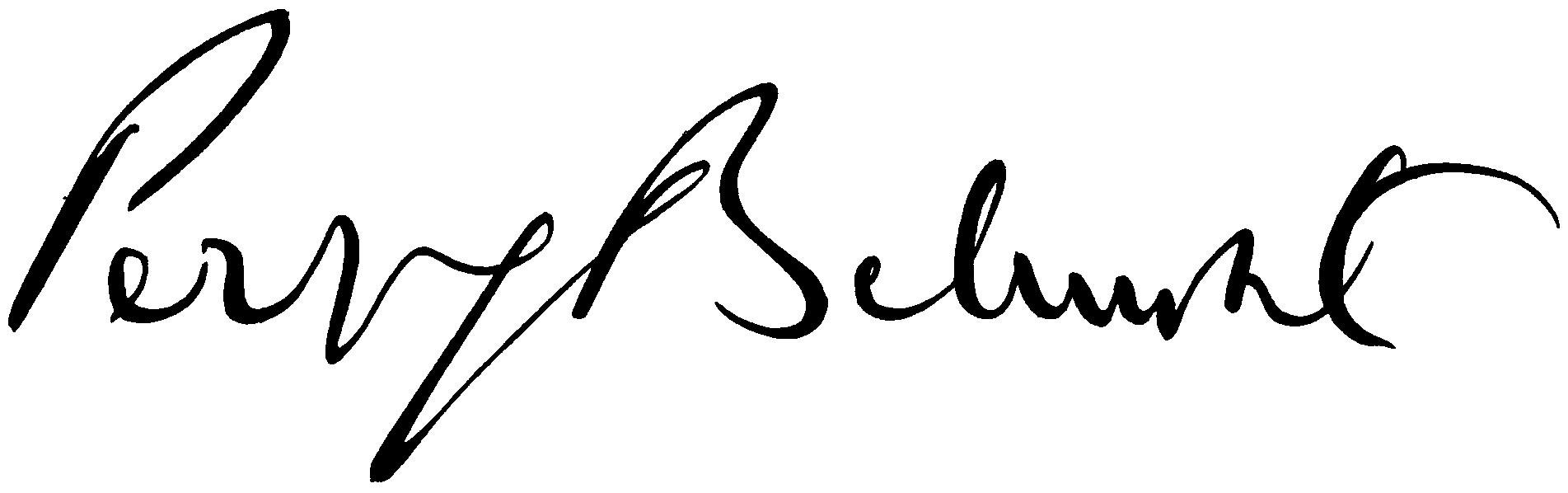
- Signature

Military service
- Allegiance: United States of America
- Branch/service: United States Army
- Rank: Major
- Unit: First Division, Second Army Corps, United States Volunteers
- Battles/wars: Spanish–American War

Perry Belmont (December 28, 1851 – May 25, 1947) was an American politician and diplomat. He served four terms in the U.S. House of Representatives from 1881 to 1888.

== Early life and education ==
Belmont was born on December 28, 1851, in New York City, the son of Caroline Slidell (née Perry) and financier August Belmont. His maternal grandfather was Commodore Matthew C. Perry. His brothers were Oliver Hazard Perry Belmont and August Belmont Jr.

He attended Everest Military Academy in Hamden, Connecticut; and graduated from Harvard College in 1872; attended the law school in the University of Berlin; and graduated from the Columbia Law School in 1876. He was admitted to the bar that same year.

=== Ancestry and memberships ===
Through his mother, he was a descendant of Captain Christopher Raymond Perry who had served as a privateer during the American Revolution and was also the father of Commodore Oliver Hazard Perry and Commodore Matthew C. Perry. By virtue of his descent from Captain Perry, Belmont became a member of the Rhode Island Society of the Sons of the Revolution. In 1929 he was elected as an honorary member of the Rhode Island Society of the Cincinnati. He was also a member of the Veteran Corps of Artillery.

== Career ==
Belmont practiced law in New York City for five years. Partnered with him in the law firm, Vinton, Belmont & Frelinghuysen, were his cousin, the writer Arthur Dudley Vinton, and George Frelinghuysen, future president of the Ballantine Brewing Company. He and his brother, August Belmont Jr., were also founding members of The Jockey Club.

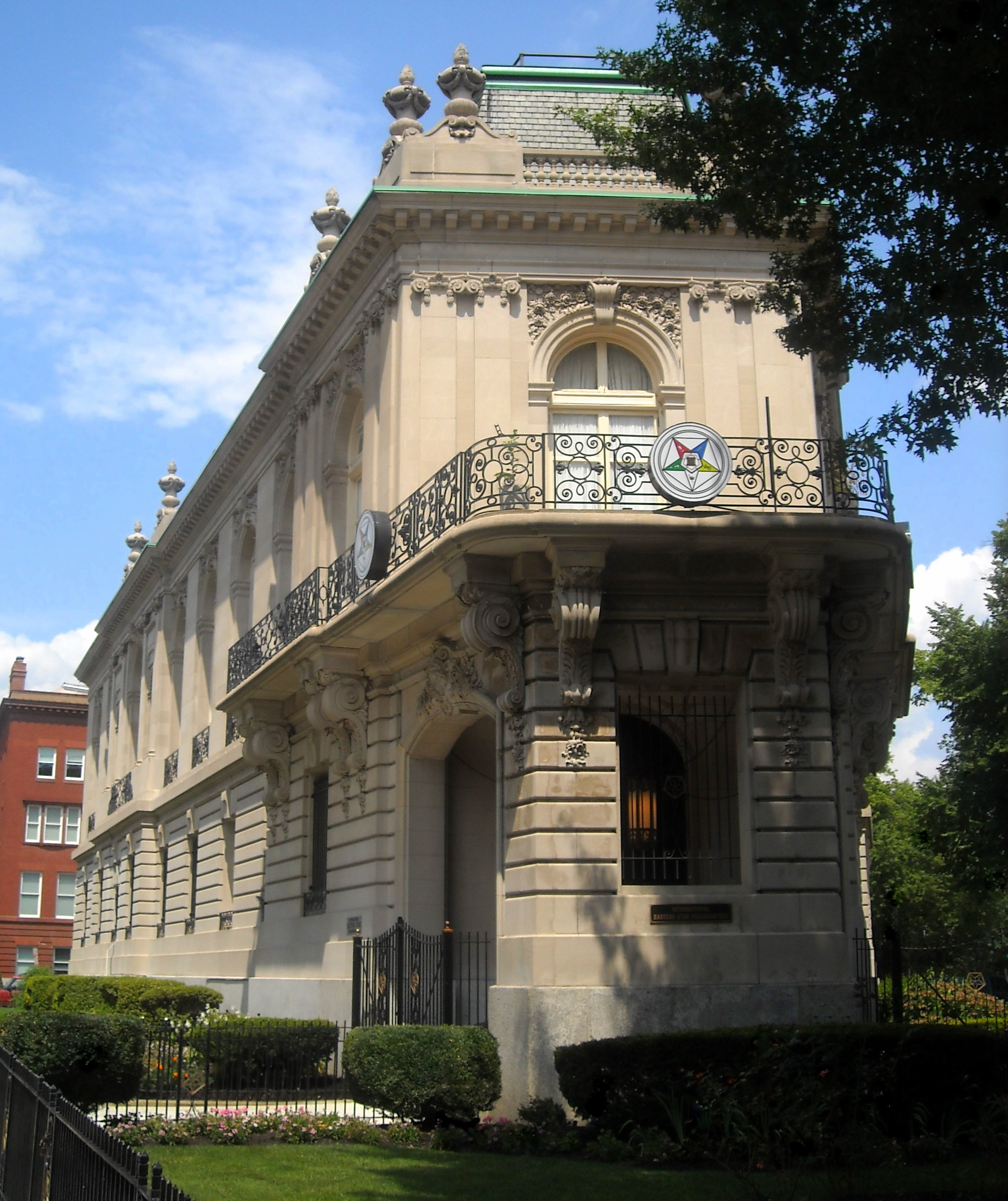
Belmont's former residence in Washington, D.C.

=== Congress ===
Elected as a Democrat to the 47th Congress and reelected to the next three Congresses, Belmont served as the U.S. representative for the first district of New York from March 4, 1881, until his resignation on December 1, 1888.

During his first term, he was a member of the committee on foreign affairs; noted for his cross-examination of James G. Blaine, the former secretary of state. The cross-examination concerned Blaine's relations with a syndicate of American capitalists interested in the development of certain guano deposits in Peru. An attempt was made to show that Blaine's efforts toward mediation between Chile and Peru were from interested motives. Belmont served from 1885 to 1887 as chairman of the committee on foreign affairs.

=== Later career ===
He was appointed United States Minister to Spain in November 1888 and served until May 1889.

On October 6, 1890, Belmont was invested as a Commander of the French Legion of Honor.

In 1902 he became a member of the Rhode Island Society of the Sons of the Revolution and served as its president from 1944 to 1945.

When the Consolidated National Bank of New York was organized on July 1, 1902, the fourteen directors included individuals such as Belmont, John W. Griggs, Henry C. Brewster, George Crocker, and Mortimer H. Wagar.

In 1906, Belmont became "permanent president" of the National Publicity Bill Organization, which fought for campaign finance disclosure.

=== Military service ===
In 1898, during the Spanish–American War, Belmont served for six weeks in the Army as an Inspector General of the First Division, Second Army Corps, United States Volunteers, with the rank of major.

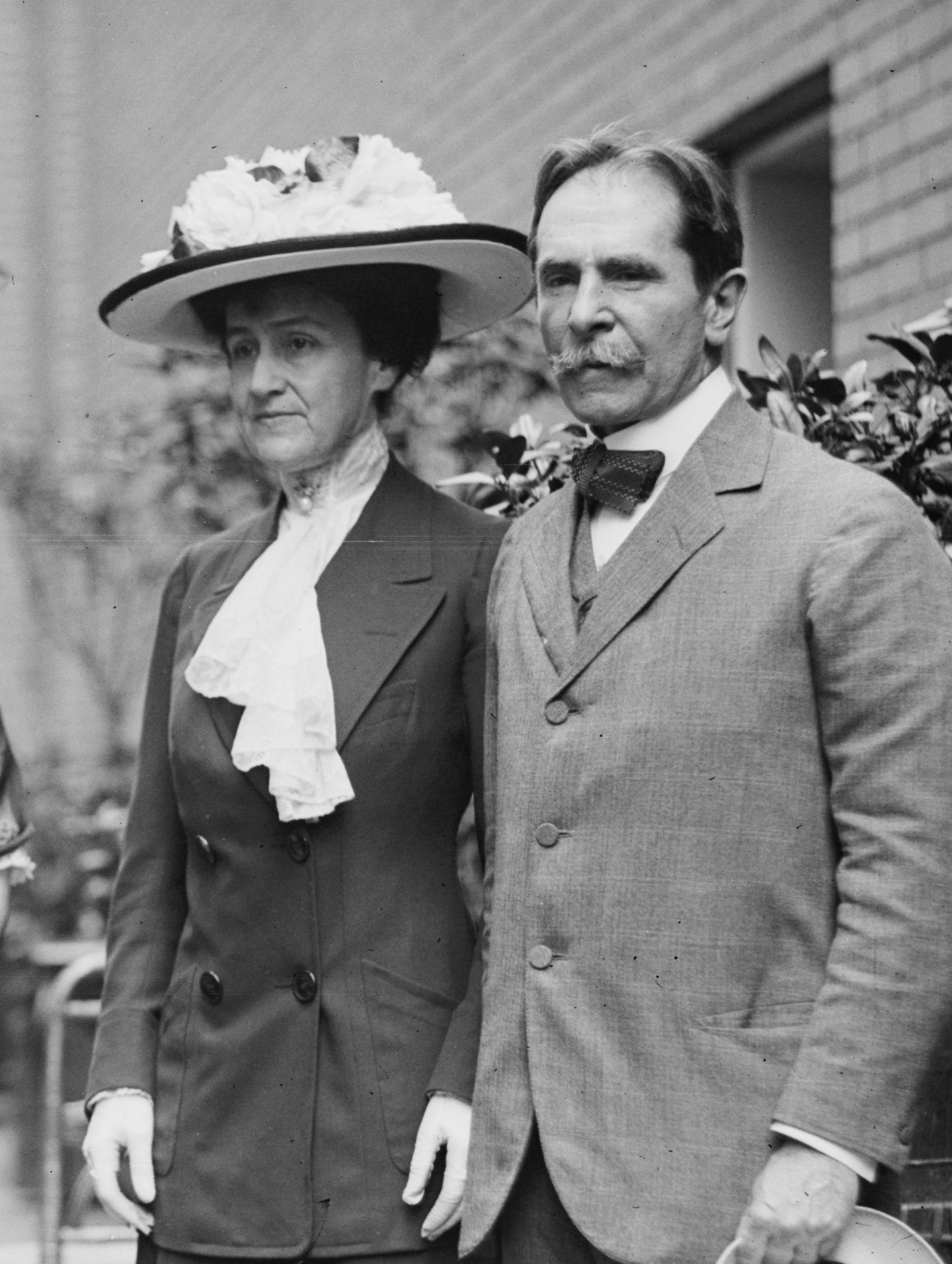
Belmont with his wife, the former Jessie Ann Robbins c. 1910–1915

During the First World War, despite being 65 years old, Belmont was commissioned as a captain in the U.S. Army Quartermaster Corps on May 5, 1917. He was assigned to the Remount Division in Washington, D.C., and was discharged on May 21, 1920.

== Personal life ==
In 1899, after 17 years of marriage, Jessie Ann Robbins (1858–1935) divorced Henry T. Sloane (son of William Sloane, the founder of W. & J. Sloane) to marry Perry Belmont. The marriage occurred only five hours after the divorce was decreed and, at the time, was considered scandalous.

=== Death and burial ===
Belmont died in Newport, Rhode Island, on May 25, 1947 (age 95 years, 148 days). He is interred along with his parents and his brother August Belmont Jr. in the Belmont family plot in the Island Cemetery in Newport. His former home in Washington, D.C., became the International Temple for the Order of the Eastern Star.

== Military awards ==
- Spanish War Service Medal
- World War I Victory Medal

== See also ==
- List of members of the American Legion
- Perry Family

U.S. House of Representatives
| Preceded by James W. Covert | Member of the U.S. House of Representatives from New York's 1st congressional district March 4, 1881 – December 1, 1888 | Succeeded by James W. Covert |
Diplomatic posts
| Preceded by Jabez L. M. Curry | U.S. Minister to Spain; 1888-1889 | Succeeded by Thomas W. Palmer |
