= 52 Broadway =

Office skyscraper in Manhattan, New York

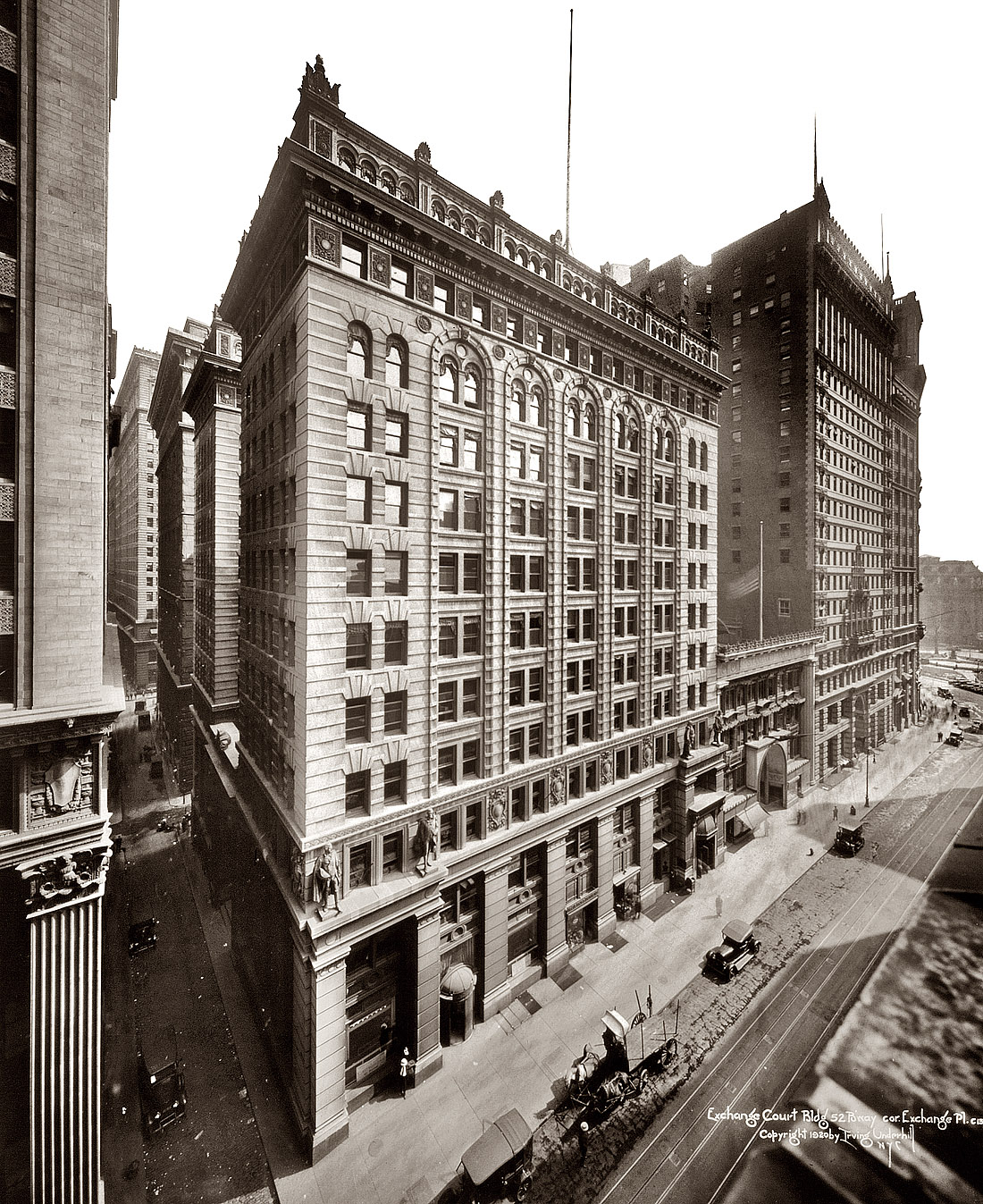
- The building in 1920
- Interactive map of the 52 Broadway area
- Former names: Exchange Court Building, Chemical Bank Building

General information
- Type: Office
- Location: 52-56 Broadway, Financial District, Manhattan, New York City, New York, United States
- Coordinates: 40°42′23″N 74°0′44″W
- Completed: 1898
- Renovated: 1982

Height
- Height: 221.51 feet (67.52 m)

Technical details
- Floor count: 20

Design and construction
- Architecture firm: Clinton and Russell

Renovating team
- Renovating firm: Emery Roth & Sons

52 Broadway, formerly known as the Exchange Court Building or Chemical Bank Building, is a high-rise building on Broadway and Exchange Place in the Financial District of Lower Manhattan, New York City. The building was erected in 1898 as a 12-story building designed by architects Clinton and Russell, but it was gutted and stripped of its entire facade in 1980-1982 by Emery Roth & Sons. It is now 221.5 feet (67.5 m) high with 20 floors.

== Tenants ==
In September 1903, the Consolidated National Bank took out a five-year lease on around 2,500 square feet of ground floor at the Exchange Court Building, which was located at the corner of Broadway and Exchange Place.

The naval architectural firm Gielow & Orr had their headquarters in the building in the early 20th century. The United Federation of Teachers currently has its headquarters in the building.

Investor Benjamin Graham rented an office at 52 Wall Street, as did the investing firm Tweedy, Browne which was closely associated with Graham and used similar investing theories.
