= Mortimer Wagar =

American banker and businessperson

Mortimer H. Wagar
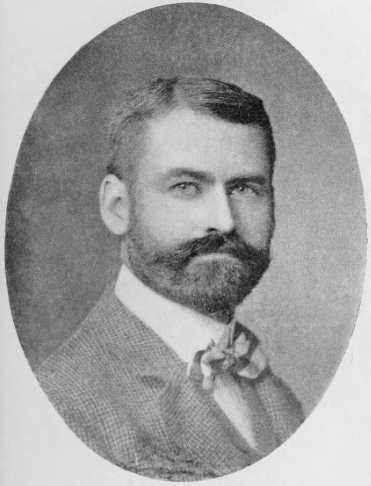
- Born: 1857; Ohio, United States
- Died: December 23, 1926 (aged 68–69); Manhattan, New York City, United States
- Occupations: Banker, businessman
- Years active: 1875–1926

Mortimer Hartwell Wagar (1857 – December 23, 1926) was an American banker and businessperson. Wagar was a member of the Consolidated Exchange for 33 years. He was president from 1900 until 1903. He retired from the exchange in June 1923, at which point he was vice president. He also helped organize the Clearing House of the Consolidated Exchange, where he was president.

== Biography ==
=== Early life and career ===
Mortimer Hartwell Wagar was born in 1857 in Toledo, Ohio. At age fourteen he started his first job as an office boy, and gradually he worked through positions at a grain and transportation business. At age 18, he was admitted to partnership by his employer, and Wagar joined the Toledo Board of Trade. He left Toledo in 1878 to vacation in Europe, and upon returning to New York, he joined the Produce Exchange. He resigned in 1885 to "engage in business on his own account," and he founded the grain brokerage firm Wagar, Martin & Co. The firm joined the Consolidated Exchange in 1890. In January 1897, he dissolved the grain broker firm Wagar and Moore, with Wagar taking the side of the business focused on the Consolidated Stock Exchange. By early June 1900, Wagar was a member of the Consolidated Stock Exchange, the Chicago Board of Trade, and the New York Produce Exchange, where he maintained an affiliation until his death.

=== Leadership at Consolidated Exchange ===
At the annual election for the presidency of the Consolidated Stock and Petroleum Exchange on June 11, 1900, Wagar defeated Charles G. Wilson, who had held the role for fifteen years. According to The New York Times, "the contest was the most closely fought in the history of the Exchange, the total number of votes cast being 793. The largest vote ever polled in a previous election was 628." Wagar polled 504 votes to 287, winning the election with "a large majority of the members" supporting him. One of his first orders of business was working towards the extermination of bucket shops. Wagar was reelected the president of Consolidated in 1901 as the nominee on both the regular and independent tickets. He was elected again the following year to succeed himself. Samuel Armstrong Nelson wrote in 1909 that Wagar's "three years of work as head of the institution were marked by great activity and progressive results of a character that advanced the Exchange's interest in almost every department." He was president of the Consolidated Exchange from 1900 until 1903. He also helped organize the Clearing House of the Consolidated Exchange, where he was president.

When he retired as president of the exchange in 1903 to join the Consolidated National Bank, he remained vice president for two years upon the exchange's request. By 1904, bucketshops had become a point of contention among the voting members of the Consolidated Stock and Petroleum Exchange. Wagar was strongly against their use, in opposition to the Exchange's governors. The annual election for officers that year was held on June 13, 1904. Wagar was again elected vice president. He retired from the exchange in June 1923, and was replaced as vice president of the Consolidated Exchange by Laurence Tweedy.

=== Banking positions ===
When the Consolidated National Bank was organized on July 1, 1902, the fourteen directors included Wagar, George Crocker, John W. Griggs, Henry C. Brewster, and Perry Belmont. Early directors as of November 16, 1904 of the Consolidated National Bank included Wagar, with Wagar as vice president.

On February 18, 1909, Wagar was named a director of the newly formed National Reserve Bank of the City of New York.

== Death and family ==
Mortimer Hartwell Wager died suddenly on December 23, 1926, at his residence at 430 West 119th Street, from heart disease. He was sixty-nine years old.

== See also ==
- Consolidated National Bank
- Consolidated Stock Exchange of New York
