= National Reserve Bank =

- Company type: Private company
- Industry: Financial services
- Predecessors: Consolidated National Bank and Oriental Bank
- Founded: March 8, 1909; 116 years ago in New York City, New York, United States
- Defunct: January 27, 1914
- Fate: Acquired by Mutual Alliance Trust Company on January 27, 1914
- Headquarters: Manhattan, New York City, United States
- Services: Banking

The National Reserve Bank of the City of New York was a New York City bank in that was formed from a merger of Consolidated National Bank and Oriental Bank in 1909 and operated until acquired by the Mutual Alliance Trust Company in 1914.

Deposits of the National Bank Reserve Bank were about $4,352,561 on January 13, 1914 and the bank had "a large number of country bank accounts, chiefly in the West and Southwest," handling a large degree of cotton exchange business.

On January 27, 1914, the National Reserve Bank was taken over by the Mutual Alliance Trust Company, operating for a time as the Reserve Branch of the trust company.

== History ==
=== 1909: Formation ===
On February 2, 1909, Consolidated National Bank ratified a plan to acquire the Oriental Bank "by allowing its shareholders to subscribe to the shares of a new institution at $150 a share." The Oriental Bank had closed the year prior, but had paid its depositors in full. The new institution, to be named the National Reserve Bank, combined aspects of both banks. A special meeting was called for February 18 for final ratification by stockholders. On February 18, 1909, the bank stockholders voted to enact the merger proposed by the directors, to take over the assets of Oriental Bank and merge them with Consolidated, creating the National Reserve Bank of the City of New York. The plan increased capital of the bank from $1,000,000 to $1,200,000. At the same meeting, 23 directors were elected to the new board, including E. A. Fisher and Mortimer H. Wagar. The bank planned to keep the Consolidated name operative until March 1, 1909. On March 2, 1909, Will-tarn O. Allison (W.O. Allison), president of Consolidated National Bank, was voted president of the new National Reserve Bank entity formed by Consolidated's absorption of Oriental Bank's assets. Thomas J. Lewis and R. W. Jones Jr. were elected vice presidents, and George W. Adams, cashier. With the merger of the reorganized Oriental Bank with the Consolidated National Bank of New York, capital was increased from $1,000,000 to $2,000,000. The National Reserve Bank of the City of New York formally opened its doors for business on March 8, 1909, at "the old banking quarters of the Oriental Bank" at 182 Broadway, corner of John Street in Manhattan, until new facilities at the City Investing Building could be completed at 165 Broadway. In late April 1909, the National Reserve Bank, formerly named Consolidated National Bank, opened for business in the City Investing Building.

=== 1914: Acquisition ===
Deposits of the National Bank Reserve were about $4,352,561 on January 13, 1914. On January 27, 1914, the National Reserve Bank was taken over by the Mutual Alliance Trust Company, which was based at 35 Wall Street. The two companies had previously been affiliated and had shared directors. At the time of the merge, the New York Times wrote that "both institutions have a large number of country bank accounts, chiefly in the West and Southwest, and handle much cotton exchange business." When the National Reserve was liquidated, its stockholders received the value "of the assets exceeding the amount of the deposits and a substantial payment for the good will of the institution." Deposits of the merged institutions came to about $12,000,000. For a time, the office of the National Bank Reserve at 165 was continued as the Reserve Branch of the trust company.

== Directors ==
On February 18, 1909, directors were elected to the board of the newly formed National Reserve Bank of the City of New York, resulting in a board totaling Wagar, Nelson G. Ayres, Charles K. Beekman, Samuel Bettle, Eugene Britton, R. W. Jones Jr., George E. Keeney, Ludwig Nissen, William O. Allison, James G. Newcomb, E. A. Fisher, E.R. Chapman, E. Burton Hart, George V. Hagerty, Thomas J. Lewis, A. M. Probst, Robert E. Dowling, George L. Gillon, Harry J. Schnell, H. Louderbough, J.H. Parker, Thomas N. Jones, and Erskine Hewitt. On March 2, 1909, Hewitt was elected chairman.

== See also ==
- List of bank mergers
