= Mutual Alliance Trust Company =

- Industry: Financial
- Genre: Trust company
- Founded: 1902; 124 years ago in New York City, United States
- Defunct: January 14, 1915; 111 years ago
- Fate: Liquidated by Chatham-Phenix National and Alliance Trust
- Successors: Chatham-Phenix National and Alliance Trust
- Headquarters: Manhattan, New York City

The Mutual Alliance Trust Company was a trust company formed in New York City in 1902, with founders such as Cornelius Vanderbilt III and William Rockefeller.

On January 14, 1915, the company was acquired by Chatham-Phenix National and Alliance Trust in New York.

== History ==
=== Formation ===
At the end of April 1902, H. M. Humphreys resigned from his positions as superintendent of the Coffee Exchange to become vice president of the newly formed Mutual Alliance Trust Company. On May 1, 1902, the New York Times reported the details of the newly formed Mutual Alliance Trust Company. It was organized by Cornelius Vanderbilt, William Rockefeller, and "a dozen more well-known men" with $1,000,000 in capital. Its initial place of business was an office at Orchard and Grand Streets in New York City. Kalman Haas was founding president, and Henry M. Humphrey vice president. It opened for business on the Tuesday after June 29, 1902, as a general trust company on the east side of Manhattan. There were 13 directors upon its founding.

=== Acquisition of National Reserve Bank ===
On January 27, 1914, the National Reserve Bank was taken over by the Mutual Alliance Trust Company, which was then based at 35 Wall Street. The two companies had previously been affiliated and had shared directors. Deposits of the merged institutions was about $12,000,000. The National Reserve was liquidated, and its stockholders received the value "of the assets exceeding the amount of the deposits and a substantial payment for the good will of the institution." James H. Parker was appointed president of the combined institution. Those of the National Bank Reserve were about $4,352,561 on January 13, 1914. At the time of the merge, the New York Times wrote that "both institutions have a large number of country bank accounts, chiefly in the West and Southwest, and handle much cotton exchange business." For a time, the office of the National Bank Reserve at 165 was continued as the Reserve Branch of the trust company.

=== Liquidation ===
In January 1915, there were negotiations for Chatham and Phenix National to buy and liquidate the Mutual Alliance Trust Company in its entirety. The merger was completed on January 14, 1915.

== Directors ==
When it opened for business on the Tuesday after June 29, 1902, there were 13 directors, including:

- Kalman Haas
- Henry H. Rogers (H. H. Rogers)
- Eugene G. Kremer
- James N. Jarvie (James M. Jarvis)
- Cornelius Vanderbilt
- Isidor Straus
- Richard A. McCurdy
- Louis Stern
- Martin Erdmann
- Percival Kuhne
- Emanuel Lehman
- William Rockefeller
- Frederic Cromwell

== See also ==
- List of bank mergers in the United States
