= Willis S. Paine =

American lawyer (1848–1927)

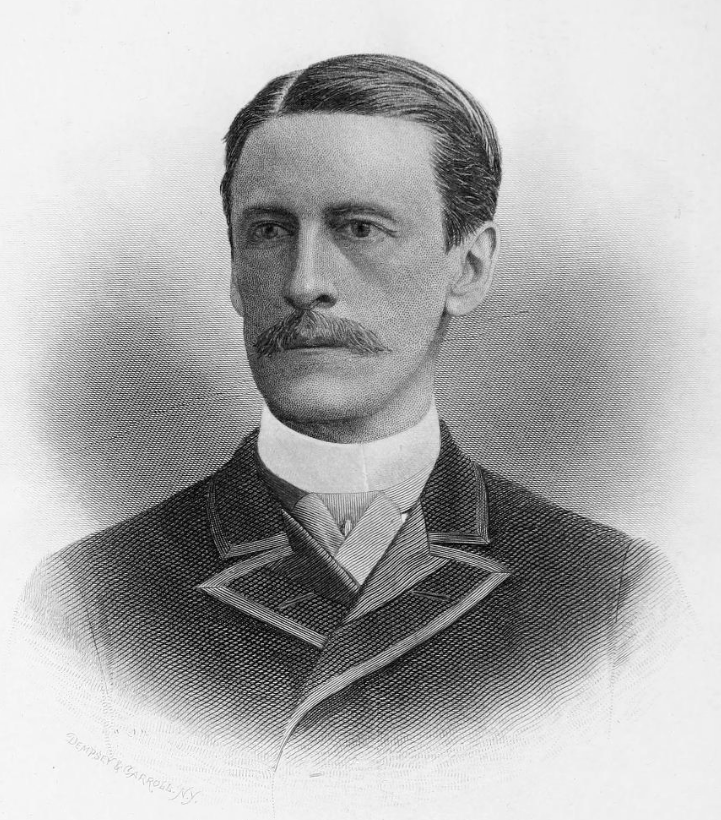
- Born: Willis Seaver Paine; January 1, 1848; Rochester, New York
- Died: April 13, 1927 (aged 79); New York, New York
- Burial place: Woodlawn Cemetery
- Occupations: Lawyer, banker
- Spouse: Virginia Brown (m. 1900)

Willis Seaver Paine (January 1, 1848 – April 13, 1927) was an American lawyer and banker from New York.

== Life ==
Paine was born on January 1, 1848, in Rochester, New York, the son of Robert E. Paine, a Rochester lawyer and District Attorney of Monroe County, and Abby M. Sprague.

Paine was valedictorian of his graduating class in Rochester Collegiate Institute in 1864. He was a student at Williams College, but he graduated with honors from the University of Rochester with an A.B. Prior to graduating, he began studying law in the office of Sanford E. Church, later the chief judge of the New York Court of Appeals. He moved with his father in New York City in 1868, at which point he continued his law studies under Charles A. Rapallo, also a judge on the Court of Appeals. He was admitted to the bar in 1869 and for some time practiced in Rapallo's law office.

In 1874, when the state legislature passed a law that authorized the bank superintendent to conduct annual examinations of the state's trust companies, Paine was appointed by the superintendent to be one of the three examiners. The examination caused the closing of three trust companies in New York City, which owed depositors six million dollars. The depositors were paid back in full, and the press credited Paine for the achievement. In 1876, the Bond Street Saving Bank was closed under court order and he was appointed as its receiver. He managed to pay back the full owed amount to the preferred creditors and over 86% to the general creditors. In 1880, when the state legislature passed an act to appoint commissioners to make a compilation and revision of the state's banking laws, Governor Cornell appointed him and William Dowd, president of the Bank of North America, as the commissioners. The revisions the two prepared was adopted by the legislature in 1882. In 1883, Governor Cleveland appointed him Superintendent of the New York State Banking Department. He declined Cleveland's offer to be appointed sub-treasurer in New York City.

In 1889, Paine resigned as superintendent to become president of The State Trust Company. He later resigned from the position to travel around the world. He served as president of The Trust Company of New York and the Merchants Safe Deposit Company. He was also chairman of the financial committee of the Trademan's National Bank and president of the Consolidated National Bank of New York City. He then resigned from those positions to go on a second trip around the world. After he returned, he became vice-president of the U.S. Fire Insurance Co. and trustee of the Metropolitan Savings Bank. He was an organizer of the trust company and savings bank sections of the American Bankers Association. He was a colonel on the staff of Governor Flower. Governor Whitman appointed him a member of the Mohansic Lake Reservation Commission, which Governors Smith and Miller reappointed him to.

Paine was a member of the New York State Bar Association, the New York City Bar Association, the Mayflower Society, the General Society of Colonial Wars, the Sons of the American Revolution, the Japan Society, Phi Beta Kappa, Theta Delta Chi, the Metropolitan Club, the Tuxedo Club, the National Arts Club, the Sleepy Hollow Country Club, and the Everglades Club. In 1888, he married Ruby S. Brown, who died in 1896. Ruby was the niece of Samuel J. Tilden. In 1900, he married Virginia Brown, who outlived him. He also authored books on New York state and national banking laws that were regarded as a standard and went through seven editions.

Paine died in the Plaza Hotel on April 13, 1927. He was buried in Woodlawn Cemetery.
