= Albert P. Laning =

American politician

Albert Pierce Laning (October 13, 1817 in Burlington, Otsego County, New York – September 4, 1880 in Buffalo, Erie County, New York) was an American lawyer and politician from New York.

== Life ==
He attended the common schools; and Oneida Conference Seminary in Cazenovia from 1838 to 1839. Then he studied law in Hammondsport, was admitted to the bar in 1841, and practiced law first in Hammondsport, then in Allegany County. In 1841, he married Esther Nancy Pulling (1821–1908), and their only daughter was Helen A. Laning (1842–1930). In 1856, the family removed to Buffalo.

He was a member of the New York State Democratic Committee from 1854 to 1858. He was a member of the New York State Assembly (Erie Co., 1st D.) in 1858, and was Chairman of the Committee of Ways and Means. He was a delegate to the 1864 and 1876 Democratic National Conventions, and an alternate delegate to the 1868 and 1872 Democratic National Conventions. He was a member of the New York State Senate (31st D.) in 1875. In 1875, he ran for Mayor of Buffalo, but was defeated by Republican Philip Becker.

He was buried at the Forest Lawn Cemetery, Buffalo.

== Sources ==
- Life Sketches of Government Officers and Members of the Legislature of the State of New York in 1875 by W. H. McElroy and Alexander McBride (pg. 72f) [e-book]
- The New York Civil List compiled by Franklin Benjamin Hough, Stephen C. Hutchins and Edgar Albert Werner (1870; pg. 486)
- THE LATE A. P. LANING in NYT on September 7, 1880

New York State Assembly
Preceded by Augustus J. Tiffany	New York State Assembly; Erie County, 1st District; 1858	Succeeded by Daniel Bowen
New York State Senate
Preceded by John Ganson	New York State Senate; 31st District; 1875	Succeeded by ?
