= Charles Frederick Crocker =

American rail executive (1854–1897)

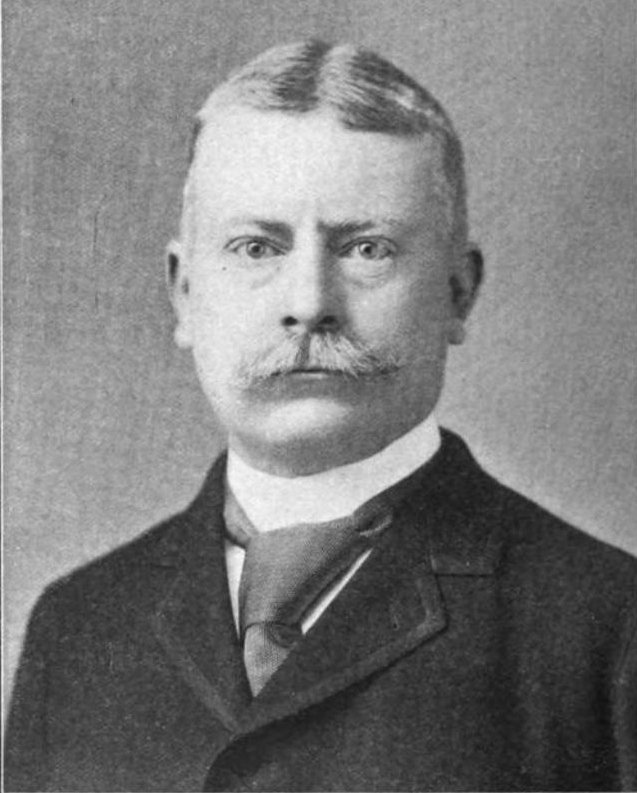
- Born: December 26, 1854; Sacramento, California, U.S.
- Died: July 17, 1897 (aged 42); San Mateo, California, U.S.
- Occupation: Railroad leader
- Spouse: Jennie Mills Easton (1858–1887)
- Children: Mary Crocker (1881–1905); Charles Templeton Crocker (1884–1948); Jennie Adeline Crocker (1887–1974)

Charles Frederick Crocker (December 26, 1854 – July 17, 1897) was vice president of the Southern Pacific Railroad Company and a member of the wealthy Crocker family.

== Biography ==
He was born in Sacramento, California, on December 26, 1854, the eldest son of Mary Ann and Charles Crocker. He was educated in Sacramento public schools, graduated from Oakland Military Academy in 1872 and attended the Brooklyn Polytechnic School (1875), but did not graduate as a result of poor eyesight.

After taking a trip to Japan, Crocker entered the family railroad business at the age of 22 as a clerk in the Fourth and Townsend Streets office of Southern Pacific. When George C. Perkins was elected governor in 1879, he appointed Crocker as a colonel in the National Guard. By 1888, Crocker was president of the San Joaquin and Sierra Nevada Railroad.

Crocker purchased the 'Uplands' estate (then part of San Mateo and later incorporated into Hillsborough) from William Henry Howard in 1894. Crocker died at 'Uplands' on July 17, 1897, from complications of Bright's disease following a brief, acute paralysis. His wife, the former Jennie Marine Easton, had died during the birth of their third child.

== Legacy ==
Crocker was survived by three children: Mary Crocker (who would later marry the congressman Francis Burton Harrison), Charles Templeton Crocker (who became a noted scientist), and Jennie Adeline Crocker.

Crocker was notably active in public affairs, serving as one of the Regents of the University of California (appointed in 1888 by Governor Waterman), as president of the California Academy of Sciences, and as a trustee of Stanford University.

== Family members ==
Crocker's brothers were banker and investor William H. Crocker, president of the Crocker Bank and George Crocker, second vice-president of the Southern Pacific Railroad. His cousin was the mystic, princess and author Aimée Crocker. His uncle Edwin B. Crocker built Sacramento's Crocker Art Museum.

=== Family tree ===
Crocker family tree

Nancy Crocker; 1792–1854	Isaac Crocker; 1781–1856
Mary Norton; 1821–47	Edwin B. Crocker; 1818–75	Margaret Rhodes; 1822–1901	Mary Ann Deming; 1827–89	Charles Crocker; 1822–88	Clarke Crocker (Note: Married to Julia A Kimball (1830–1901)); 1827–90	Henry Smith Crocker (Note: Married to Clara Ellen Swinerton (1845–1910)) (Note: At least one son, Charles Henry (1865–1935)) (Note: a San Francisco publisher of maps and Crocker-Langley San Francisco city directories and a railroad investor); 1832–1904
Mary Norton Crocker; 1846–1923	[two marriages]	Edwin Clark Crocker; 1856–56	Nellie Margaret Crocker; 1856–79	Aimée Isabella Crocker; 1864–1941	[five marriages]	Henry J. Crocker (Note: Married to Mary Virginia Ives (1863–1929)) (Note: Multiple siblings (not shown)); 1861–1912
Kate Eugenie Crocker; 1854–74	James O.B. Gunn; 1846–1923	Jennie Louise Crocker; 1860–1939	Jacob Sloat Fassett; 1853–1924
[multiple children] (Note: Including actress Kate McComb (1871–1959), from Mary Crocker's first marriage to Charles L. Scudder.)	[multiple children]	[multiple children]
Emily Elizabeth Crocker; 1853–53	Emma Hanchett; 1855–1904	George Crocker; 1856–1909	Harriet Valentine Crocker; 1859–1935	Charles Beatty Alexander (Note: Uncle of Eleanor Butler Roosevelt (1888–1960)); 1849–1927
Jennie Easton (Note: Niece of Darius Ogden Mills (1825–1910)); 1858–87	Charles Frederick Crocker; 1854–97	Francis Crocker; 1858–62	Ethel Sperry; 1861–1934	William Henry Crocker
Mary Crocker; 1881–1905	Francis Burton Harrison; 1873–1957	Harriet Crocker Alexander; 1888–1972	Winthrop W. Aldrich; 1885–1974	[multiple children]
Helene Irwin (Note: Daughter of William G. Irwin (1843–1914)); 1887–1966	Charles Templeton Crocker; 1884–1948	Janetta Alexander; 1890–1973	Arnold Whitridge; 1892–1989	Harry Crocker; 1893–1958
Malcolm Whitman; 1877–1932	Jennie Adeline Crocker; 1887–1974	Robert Henderson; 1877–1940	Mary Crocker Alexander; 1895–1986	Sheldon Whitehouse; 1883–1965
[multiple children]	[multiple children]	[one child]	[multiple children]	[multiple children]	[multiple children] (Note: Including Ambassador Charles S. Whitehouse (1921–2001), father of US Senator Sheldon Whitehouse (1955–); and Sylvia Whitehouse (1930–), wife of Ambassador Robert O. Blake (1921–2015) and mother of Ambassador Robert O. Blake Jr. (1957–).)

Notes

Sources
- "Crocker Family Tree". San Mateo County Historical Association.
