= Aimée Crocker =

American writer (1864–1941)

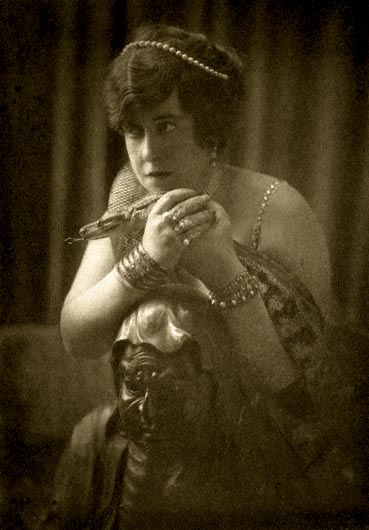
- Crocker circa 1890
- Born: Amy Isabella Crocker; December 5, 1864; Sacramento, California, U.S.
- Died: February 7, 1941 (aged 76); New York City, U.S.
- Resting place: Sacramento Historic City Cemetery
- Other name: Princess Aimée Isabella Crocker Ashe Gillig Gouraud Miskinoff Galitzine
- Spouses: Richard Porter Ashe (m. 1882; div. 1887) Henry Mansfield Gillig (m. 1889; div. 1900) Jackson Gouraud (m. 1901; died 1910) Prince Alexander Miskinoff (m. 1914; div. 1916) Prince Mstislav Galitzine, Count Ostermann (m. 1925; div. 1927)
- Children: 5
- Parent(s): Edwin B. Crocker; Margaret Rhodes
- Relatives: Jennie Louise Crocker Fassett (sister); Charles Crocker (uncle); Charles Frederick Crocker (cousin); George Crocker (cousin); William Henry Crocker (cousin); Henry J. Crocker (cousin); Templeton Crocker (cousin); Harry Crocker (cousin); Bradford Dillman (cousin)

Aimée Isabella Crocker (December 5, 1864 – February 7, 1941) was an American mystic, bohemian, author, and member of the wealthy Crocker family. She was known for her cultural exploration of the Far East, for her extravagant parties in San Francisco, New York and Paris, and her collections of husbands and lovers, adopted children, Buddhas, pearls, tattoos, and snakes.

== Early life and family ==
Crocker was born Amy Isabella Crocker on December 5, 1864, in Sacramento, California, to Judge Edwin B. Crocker and his second wife Margaret (née Rhodes). Crocker was the sixth child in a family of four girls, two boys, and a half sister. Three of the children died young. She was the younger sister of Jennie Louise Crocker Fassett, who was the wife of NY Congressman Jacob Sloat Fassett. Crocker's father was the chief legal counsel for the Central Pacific Railroad and was one of its principal investors along with Mark Hopkins, Collis Huntington, Leland Stanford and brother Charles Crocker, also known as The Big Four. Together they built the western portion of the world's first transcontinental railroad. Edwin served briefly as Chief Justice of California. Crocker's mother Margaret is also known for founding Sacramento's Crocker Art Museum, the longest continuously operating art museum in the West with, for a time, the largest private collection in the country.

Crocker was the first cousin of William Henry Crocker, humanitarian and president of three West Coast institutions: the Crocker Bank (once the fourteenth largest bank in the nation), the University of California Board of Regents, and the California Academy of Sciences. When much of the city of San Francisco was destroyed by the fire from the 1906 earthquake, William Crocker and his bank were major forces in financing reconstruction. William's wife Ethel was one of the leading California patrons of French Impressionist art.

Crocker's grandson Gerald Russell was a naturalist, an adventurer and a cryptozoologist who headed several very well publicized expeditions including the Percy Sladen Expedition to Africa, where in the high forests of the British Cameroons, he reportedly encountered a large unclassified animal Mokèlé-mbèmbé, and the Ruth Harkness Asiatic Expedition to Tibet, where he captured the first live giant panda. Russell also led two expeditions in the Himalayas in search of a yeti—the Daily Mail Expedition of 1954 and the Slick Johnson Snowman Expedition of 1958.

In 1875, the ten-year-old Crocker inherited $10 million (approximately $293,182,000 today) when her father "E.B." died. In 1880, her mother Margaret decided to send the boy-crazy Amy to a finishing school in Dresden, Germany. There she was presented at court and had her first love affair and engagement with Prince Alexander of Saxe Weimar. Crocker broke off the engagement and quickly had a brief entanglement with a Spanish bullfighter.

In 1883, Crocker made headlines when she was traveling to Los Angeles on her honeymoon with first husband Porter Ashe. The train carrying the eloping couple broke loose at the summit of a hill in Tehachapi, killing twenty-one people and seriously injuring another twelve. Ashe, whose forefathers had given their name to Asheville, North Carolina and whose uncle was the great Civil War Admiral David Farragut, was credited with pulling people to safety. The New York Times reported that Ashe "exhibited a great deal of cool heroism at the burning of the cars. After drawing his wife and her maid through the window of the sleeper, he rescued ex-California Governor John G. Downey from between broken timbers, and saved his life."

Not long after the birth of their daughter, Alma, Crocker and Ashe's marriage collapsed. Ashe plunged into a score of speculations, none of which proved successful. He spent a small fortune on horse racing studs, and then sold off many of them to settle gambling debts. His friendship with actress Lillie Langtry was the source of much gossip. The breakup of Crocker's first marriage became a national scandal after Porter and his brother, Sidney, kidnapped Alma in Los Angeles, while Crocker and her mother attended a wedding. Charges and counter charges made daily news during the custody battle. Courthouse proceedings attracted a crowd of hundreds. In spite of Ashe's reputation as a notorious gambler, his kidnapping charge and a weapons charge, he was awarded sole custody of Alma. Crocker was considered the more unsettled of the pair. The child was later adopted by Crocker's mother who changed her name to Gladys.

=== Family tree ===
Crocker family tree

Nancy Crocker; 1792–1854	Isaac Crocker; 1781–1856
Mary Norton; 1821–47	Edwin B. Crocker; 1818–75	Margaret Rhodes; 1822–1901	Mary Ann Deming; 1827–89	Charles Crocker; 1822–88	Clarke Crocker (Note: Married to Julia A Kimball (1830–1901)); 1827–90	Henry Smith Crocker (Note: Married to Clara Ellen Swinerton (1845–1910)) (Note: At least one son, Charles Henry (1865–1935)) (Note: a San Francisco publisher of maps and Crocker-Langley San Francisco city directories and a railroad investor); 1832–1904
Mary Norton Crocker; 1846–1923	[two marriages]	Edwin Clark Crocker; 1856–56	Nellie Margaret Crocker; 1856–79	Aimée Isabella Crocker; 1864–1941	[five marriages]	Henry J. Crocker (Note: Married to Mary Virginia Ives (1863–1929)) (Note: Multiple siblings (not shown)); 1861–1912
Kate Eugenie Crocker; 1854–74	James O.B. Gunn; 1846–1923	Jennie Louise Crocker; 1860–1939	Jacob Sloat Fassett; 1853–1924
[multiple children] (Note: Including actress Kate McComb (1871–1959), from Mary Crocker's first marriage to Charles L. Scudder.)	[multiple children]	[multiple children]
Emily Elizabeth Crocker; 1853–53	Emma Hanchett; 1855–1904	George Crocker; 1856–1909	Harriet Valentine Crocker; 1859–1935	Charles Beatty Alexander (Note: Uncle of Eleanor Butler Roosevelt (1888–1960)); 1849–1927
Jennie Easton (Note: Niece of Darius Ogden Mills (1825–1910)); 1858–87	Charles Frederick Crocker; 1854–97	Francis Crocker; 1858–62	Ethel Sperry; 1861–1934	William Henry Crocker
Mary Crocker; 1881–1905	Francis Burton Harrison; 1873–1957	Harriet Crocker Alexander; 1888–1972	Winthrop W. Aldrich; 1885–1974	[multiple children]
Helene Irwin (Note: Daughter of William G. Irwin (1843–1914)); 1887–1966	Charles Templeton Crocker; 1884–1948	Janetta Alexander; 1890–1973	Arnold Whitridge; 1892–1989	Harry Crocker; 1893–1958
Malcolm Whitman; 1877–1932	Jennie Adeline Crocker; 1887–1974	Robert Henderson; 1877–1940	Mary Crocker Alexander; 1895–1986	Sheldon Whitehouse; 1883–1965
[multiple children]	[multiple children]	[one child]	[multiple children]	[multiple children]	[multiple children] (Note: Including Ambassador Charles S. Whitehouse (1921–2001), father of US Senator Sheldon Whitehouse (1955–); and Sylvia Whitehouse (1930–), wife of Ambassador Robert O. Blake (1921–2015) and mother of Ambassador Robert O. Blake Jr. (1957–).)

Notes

Sources
- "Crocker Family Tree". San Mateo County Historical Association.

== Life in the Far East ==
After the public humiliation of losing her child to her ex-husband, Crocker decided to accept an invitation that she had received years earlier by King Kalākaua to tour Hawaii, then known as the Sandwich Islands. Kalākaua was so enamored of Crocker that he gave her one of his islands and an official title: Princess Palaikalani—Bliss of Heaven. She found an occasional traveling companion in her second husband, Henry Mansfield Gillig, whom she married in 1889. Gillig was a Navy commodore, a prestidigitator, and a respected amateur opera singer who cultivated his voice under the Polish master Jean de Reszke.

Crocker's 1936 autobiography, And I'd Do It Again, chronicles many adventures the heiress had while touring the Far East, sometimes with Gillig and sometimes traveling alone including: an escape from headhunters in Borneo, a poisoning in Hong Kong; a murder attempt by knife-throwing servants in Shanghai; three weeks in the harem of Bhurlana (She claimed to be the first English-speaking woman who had ever seen the inside of a harem); a search for Kaivalya (Liberation) at the cave of the Great Yogin Bhojaveda in Poona; and two bizarre sensual experiences, one with an Indian boa constrictor, and another with a Chinese violin in "the House of the Ivory Panels." After touring off and on in "the Orient" for over six years she began appearing at social events in San Francisco and New York sporting tattoos, wearing snakes around her neck at parties and declaring her love for the Buddha. Crocker also wrote about her Far East adventures in a book of short stories published in 1910, Moon Madness and Other Fantasies, which her publisher called "arabesques" and she described as "memoirs in fiction form."

During her marriage to Gillig, Crocker had several affairs with powerful Asian men, which were chronicled in her memoirs. She had a three-year affair with literary genius and columnist Edgar Saltus, an internationally known figure of the Decadent movement. Saltus wrote books about Honoré de Balzac and the philosophy of Arthur Schopenhauer. He wrote two well received historical novels about the debauchery of the Roman emperors and the Russian czars. Saltus also wrote a tome about the history of atheism. He later became a theosophist.

== Life in New York ==
Crocker met her third husband, songwriter Jackson Gouraud, at a Buddhist colony that she organized (said to be the first in Manhattan). Gouraud wrote the ragtime melodies "Keep Your Eye on Your Friend, Mr. Johnson", "She's a 'Spectable Married Colored Lady", "I'se Workin'—I'se Hustlin", "He's My Soft Shell Crab on Toast", and "My Jetney Queen". He set the town singing with the broadly comic number-one hit of his song writing career, "Waldorf-Hyphen-Astoria." Marrying a showman was controversial at the time to her family and peers as Jackson was considered an "upper servant" at best and beneath the dignity of New York high society. Jackson's father, George Edward Gouraud, was himself an internationally known figure who acted as an agent for Thomas Edison in Europe. He helped found the Edison Telephone Company of London, and a number of European companies using Edison's technology.

Crocker and Gouraud adopted three children, Reginald, Yvonne and Dolores (she would later adopt another daughter, Yolanda), and acquired numerous bulldogs. The couple lived in Oriental-themed homes in Manhattan and on Long Island. They also had tattoos of each other's initials inscribed inside coiling snakes. Crocker then reunited with her daughter, Gladys, who went on to marry Gouraud's brother, Powers, making her daughter (who was already legally her sister) a sister-in-law.

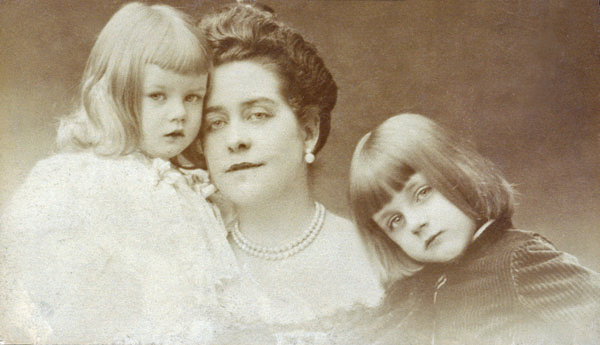
Aimée with children Yvonne and Reginald (circa 1905) photo courtesy of Crocker Art Museum

The couple became well known Broadway "First Nighters" attending all of the opening nights of the biggest plays at the grandest theaters. Crocker befriended all of the popular performers of the era including Anna Held, David Belasco, John Drew, and the Barrymore family. Her good friend, Italian tenor Enrico Caruso, often visited and sometimes performed at her New York homes. Crocker would eventually be invited to play herself on Broadway at the grand opening of the Folies Bergère Theater in Rennold Wolf's vaudeville "profane satire" piece Hell, with music by Irving Berlin. Another Aimée Crocker-inspired character would turn up in a modern society comedy "The Lassoo", by Victor Mapes, a few years later at the Lyceum. Broadway legend George M. Cohan wrote a comedy "Broadway Jones", and a musical "Billie", with an Aimée Crocker character.

The Gourauds made headlines in the early 1900s when their lavish mansion on Long Island Sound burned to the ground, and when, on another occasion, several of Crocker's prize winning French bulldogs were poisoned. The power couple was known to go on "slumming" tours through the dregs of lower New York City with good friend and self-proclaimed mayor of Chinatown Chuck Connors, who Crocker claimed silently ruled the underworld.

Around this time, Crocker began hosting lavish parties that shocked and embarrassed New York's conservative upper crust. She threw a Robinson Crusoe-themed party in Parisian treetops in 1905. At a country circus party at the Hippodrome, then the largest theater in New York, she appeared as a dairy maid and arrived on the back of an elephant. Her co-host that evening was the legendary scallywag/carnival barker Wilson Mizner, who would later become a co-owner of the Brown Derby restaurants in Los Angeles. Crocker knew the Mizner family from her San Francisco days and was linked romantically in print to Wilson's brother Lansing. Another memorable appearance was as Madame de Pompadour, Louis XV's mistress, in a costume party in Paris, and yet another gala that she hosted where her pet boa constrictor, Kaa, was the guest of honor.

One of Crocker's most widely publicized events was "The Dance of All Nations." The evening's program included a "Salome" dance, the Vienna Viggle, and a performer named Dogmeena, who wore coconut oil and a red sash to perform La Danse des Igorrotes. Crocker performed La Madrileña, an Argentine tango that was banned by the Catholic Church at the time, with a dance partner while wearing a large pearl costume. Later in the program, she performed La Danse de Cobra with a twelve-foot snake wrapped around her neck, telling hesitant guests that the animal was gentle.

Because of her frenetic and lascivious lifestyle, Crocker was shunned by much of New York society including some members of her extended family. The public, however, was mesmerized by her. The Philadelphia Inquirer named her "The Most Fascinating Woman of Her Age" and "The Queen of Bohemia." The Bohemian set in New York worshiped her. They were spellbound by the adventurous stories of the well-traveled heiress. They were impressed by her bevy of young male admirers. They were inspired by the guest lists at her gatherings, which were brimming with both illustrious and infamous merrymakers. She sometimes co-hosted events with Bohemian artist friend Edmund Russell, a well-known "Delsartean" lifestyle coach, an actor, an apostle of Madame Helena Blavatsky, and Aimée Crocker's portrait painter.

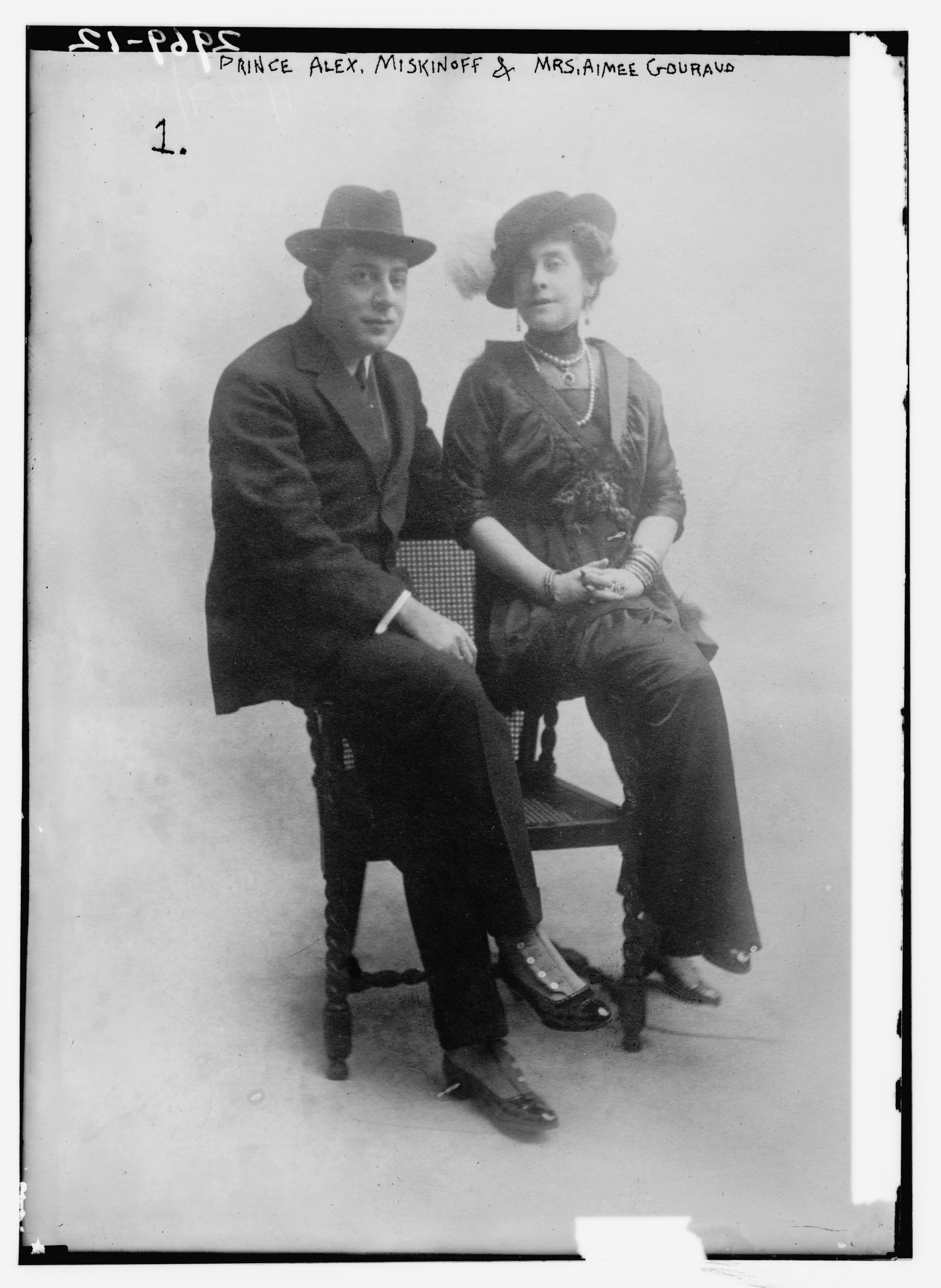
Crocker and Alexander Miskinoff in 1914

== Later years ==
In 1910, Gouraud died of an acute attack of tonsillitis. The devastated heiress was hospitalized in Paris. Later that year, a publicity tour for her first book catapulted her into the spotlight. For the next 20 years she was America's most eccentric personality whose every move made headlines. She changed the spelling of her name from "Amy" to "Aimée" for the book and moved her children to an estate in Paris dubbed "The House of Fantasy". Crocker would live in Paris off and on for the next 27 years, throwing sensational and neurotic parties and housing young artists and exiled Russian nobles. She briefly lived in an artist colony at Hôtel Biron whose other residents included Henri Matisse, Auguste Rodin, Jean Cocteau and Isadora Duncan.

After Gouraud's death, Crocker was romantically linked to many high-profile men, including: Eduardo García-Mansilla, the great Argentinean musician, composer and diplomat, with whom she wrote a song, Mon Amour; operatic baritone Genia D'Agarioff, credited with being the first to sing in the Russian language in London and Paris; composer, performer, designer, director, and arranger Melville Ellis; Jacques Lebaudy, the self-proclaimed "Emperor of the Sahara"; and legendary French actor Édouard de Max, "The Most Beautiful Man in Paris."

Another notable suitor during this period was famous ceremonial magician, occultist, Tantra master and hedonist Aleister Crowley, who wrote about their memorable decade-long affair in graphic detail in his journals. He proposed marriage to Crocker nearly every time he saw her or wrote to her.

Though she kept the name Gouraud for the rest of her life, Crocker went on to marry and divorce two more times, both to Russian princes decades younger than herself. Her fourth husband, Alexander Miskinoff, caused a stir on two continents when he was accused of having an extramarital affair with Crocker's then 15-year-old adopted daughter, Yvonne. Aimée would marry her fifth and final husband, Prince Mstislav Galitzine, when she was 61 and he was 26. When asked by a friend who lost count of her marriages whether Mstislav was her fifth or sixth husband, she said, "The prince is my twelfth husband if I include in my matrimonial list seven Oriental husbands, not registered under the laws of the Occident."

== Death ==
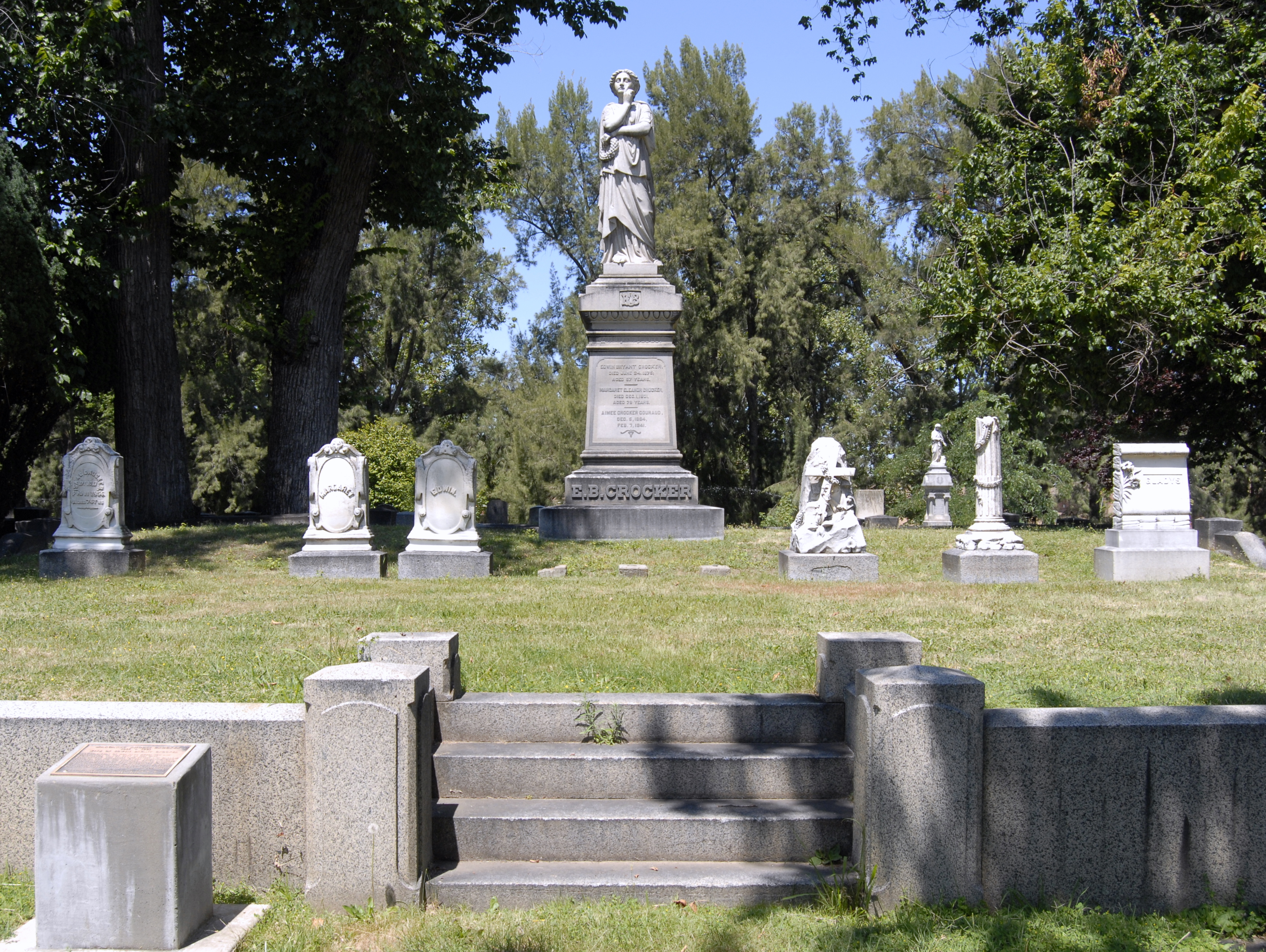
Crocker Family Gravesite

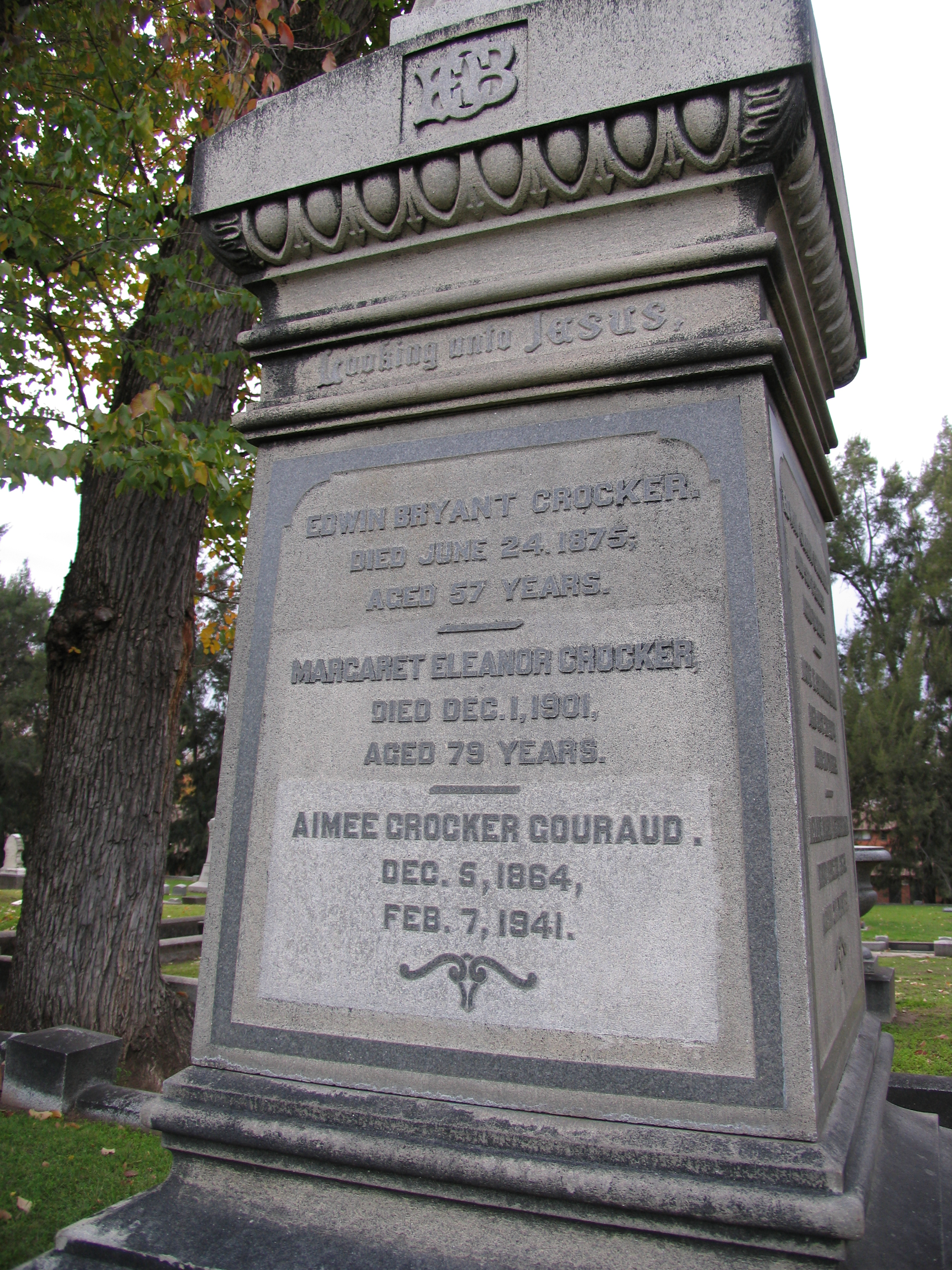
Aimée Crocker Gouraud grave

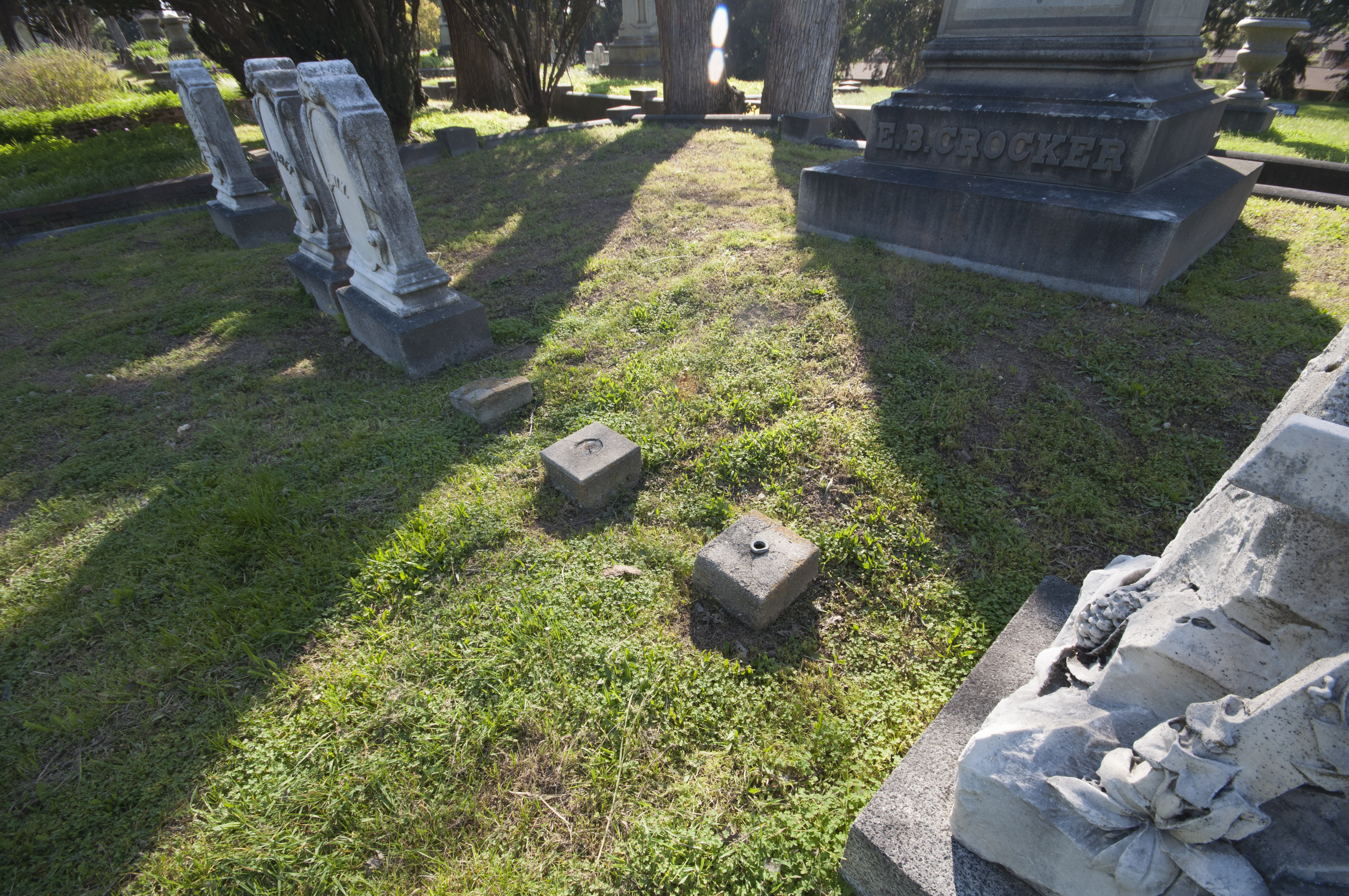
Crocker's urn as well as those of her husband Jackson Gouraud and her daughter Yolanda were stolen. Her daughter's urn was recovered and is in storage.

Crocker died on February 7, 1941. She was interred in the Crocker family plot along with her third husband, Jackson, and two of her daughters in the Sacramento Historic City Cemetery. The brass urns holding both her ashes and the ashes of her third husband, Jackson Gouraud, were stolen.
