= Crocker family =

Biography of Crocker family

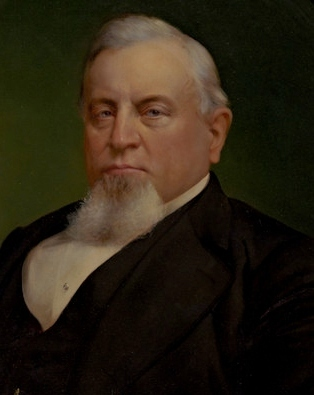
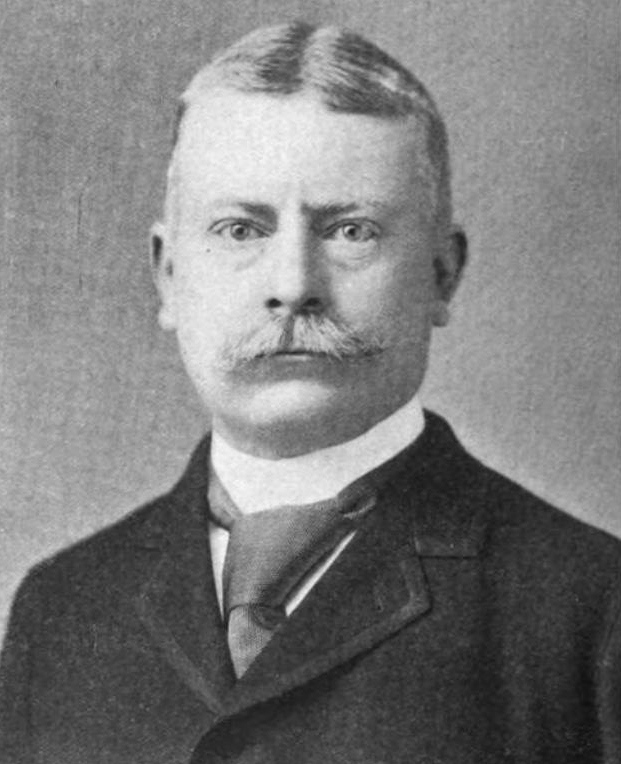
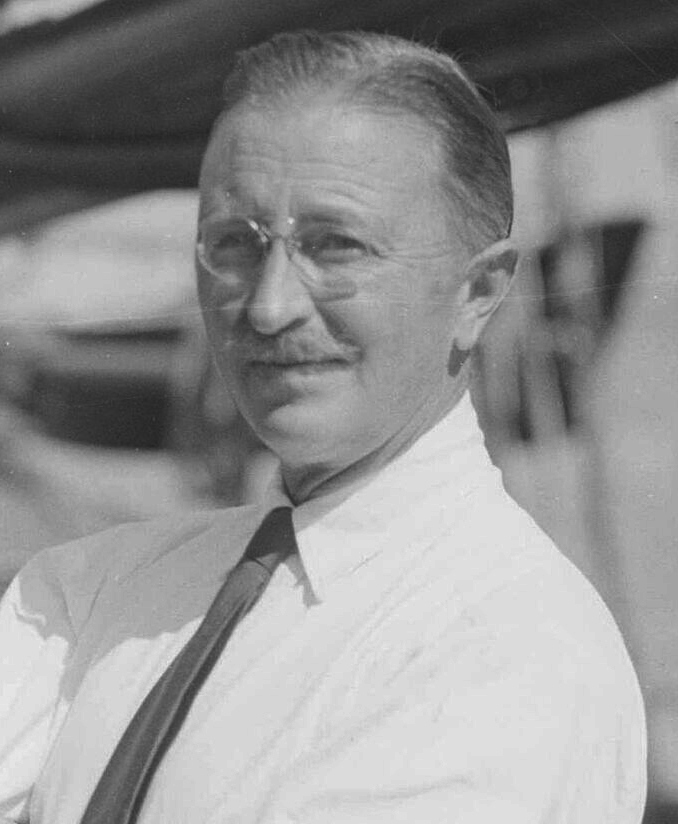
- Charles Crocker Charles Frederick Crocker Templeton Crocker
- Current region: California, U.S.
- Origin: England
- Founder: William Crocker
- Connected families: Fassett family
- Estate: Crocker-McMillin Mansion

The Crocker family was a wealthy American family based in California. Its fortune was primarily built in the railroad industry under Charles Crocker. In addition to his large holdings in railroads, Charles also invested extensively in real estate, hotels and banks. Following his death in 1888, Crocker left his family an inheritance estimated to be worth between $20-40 million at the time.

== History ==
=== Charles Crocker ===
The Crocker family's fortune was originally earned by Charles Crocker, an industrialist in the late 19th century. During the 1860s, Crocker joined a team of wealthy investors (i.e. the "Big Four") in overseeing the construction of the Central Pacific Railroad which was successfully completed in 1869. Later, in 1879, Crocker purchased control of the Southern Pacific Railroad. By 1884, he oversaw the merger of both railroads, thereby giving rise to one of the largest railway systems in the Western United States.

Notwithstanding his extensive railroad empire, Charles Crocker's holdings were not limited to railways. In 1886, he took part in the incorporation of the Crocker Woolworth National Bank, a financial institution which ultimately grew to become the 14th-largest bank in the United States. Crocker also owned large stakes in the Del Monte Hotel and real estate.

At the time of Charles Crocker's death in 1888, his estate is estimated to have been worth between $20-40 million. According to Business Insider, this amount would be equivalent to at least $400 million in 2012.

== Members ==
- William Crocker (b.1615)
  - John Crocker (1637-1711)
    - James Crocker (1699-1785)
      - Levi Crocker (b.1728)
        - Isaac Crocker (1781–1856)
          - Edwin Bryant Crocker (1818–1875)
            - Mary Norton Crocker (1846-1923)
            - Kate Eugenie Crocker (1854–74)
            - Nellie Margaret Crocker (1856–79)
            - Jennie Louise Crocker (1860–1939)
            - Aimée Isabella Crocker (1864–1941)
          - Charles Crocker (1822-1888)
            - Charles Frederick Crocker (1854-1897)
              - Mary Crocker (1881–1905)
              - Charles Templeton Crocker (1884–1948)
              - Jennie Adeline Crocker (1887–1974)
            - George Crocker (1856-1909)
            - Francis Crocker (1858-1862)
            - Harriet Valentine Crocker (1859-1935)
              - Harriet Crocker Alexander (1888–1972)
              - Janetta Alexander (1890–1973)
              - Mary Crocker Alexander (1895–1986)
          - Clarke Crocker (1827-1890)
            - Henry J. Crocker (1861–1912)
              - Henry Joseph Crocker II (1893-1958)
          - Henry Smith Crocker (January 31, 1832 - July 18, 1904), a San Francisco publisher of maps and city directories, and a railroad investor

== Businesses ==
The following is a list of businesses in which the Crocker family have held a controlling or otherwise significant interest.

- Central Pacific Railroad
- Crocker Land Company
- Crocker National Bank
- Gila Valley, Globe and Northern Railway
- Hotel Del Monte
- Oregon and California Railroad
- San Antonio and Aransas Pass Railway
- San Joaquin and Sierra Nevada Railroad
- Santa Rosa and Carquinez Railroad
- Southern Pacific Railroad
- St. Francis Hotel
- Texas and New Orleans Railroad
- Wells Fargo (1852–1998)
- The West Side Flume & Lumber Company

== Other Sources ==
- Henderson, Alan (21 October 2010). "Crocker Family Tree Banner, 2010". San Mateo County Historical Association.
