= William Henry Crocker =

American banker

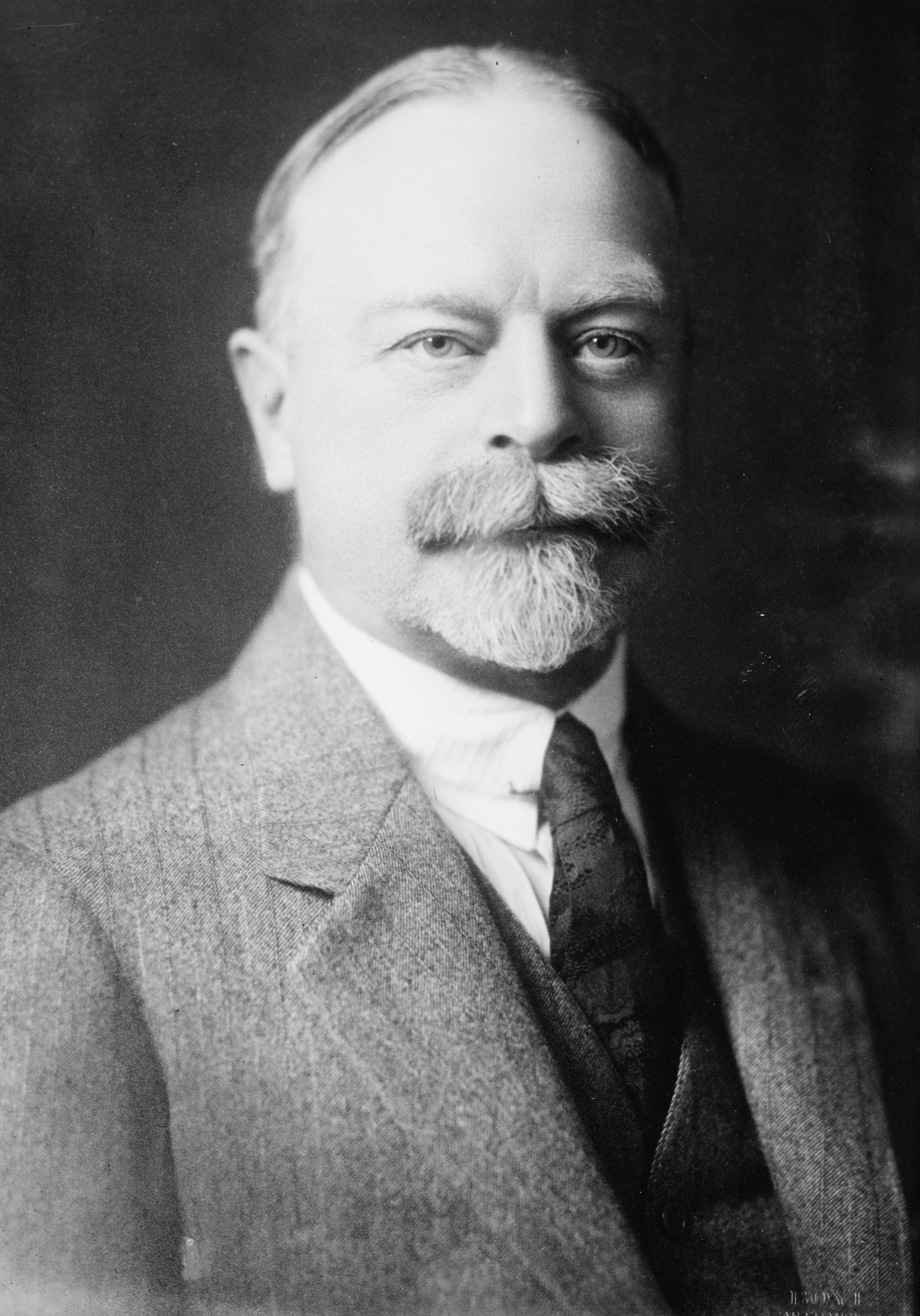
William H. Crocker

William Henry Crocker I (January 13, 1861 – September 25, 1937) was a member of the wealthy Crocker family and a prominent member of the Republican Party. Over the course of his business career, he became the president of Crocker National Bank.

== Early life ==
Crocker was born on January 19, 1861, in Sacramento, California. His father, Charles Crocker (1822-1888), one of the "Big Four" railroad magnates, was the builder of the Central Pacific Railroad.

His uncle, Edwin B. Crocker, a wealthy California lawyer and later California Supreme Court justice, and his wife, Margaret Crocker (née Norton) founded the oldest still operating museum of the Western United States in Sacramento, the Crocker Art Museum.

His nephew, Harry Crocker, was a movie star in the 1920s and, at one time, the personal assistant of Charlie Chaplin.

His cousin, Aimée Crocker, was an heiress, writer and world traveler known for her unconventional public life in the late 19th and early 20th centuries.

His cousin, Henry J. Crocker, was a prominent San Franciscan businessman and one of the Committee of Fifty, who got into a well documented public feud with William, eventually leading to a court ruling against him in his claim of having been defrauded by his own cousin.

William attended Phillips Academy, Andover and Yale University, where he was a brother of the Delta Kappa Epsilon fraternity (Phi chapter).

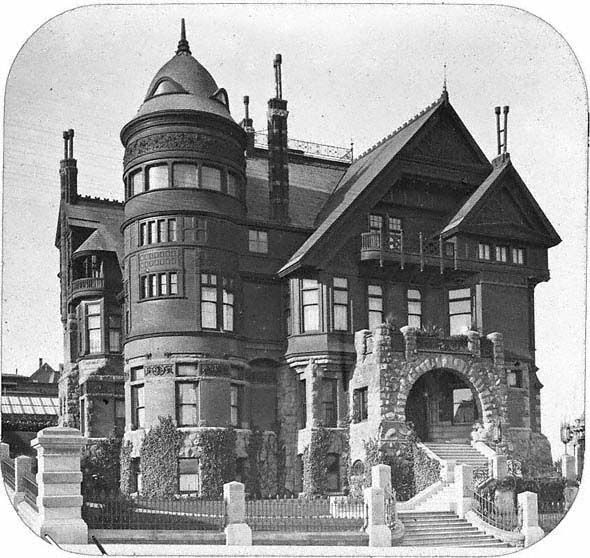
William H. Crocker's Queen Anne style mansion (1888), formerly at 1150 California Street, now the site of the Choir of Grace Cathedral

== Career ==
Crocker was president of Crocker National Bank. When much of the city of San Francisco was destroyed by the fire from the 1906 earthquake, Crocker and his bank were major forces in financing reconstruction.

Crocker also was a director of the Sperry Flour Co., the company of his wife's family owning a chain of flour mills across the US, a truly global conglomerate, with branches as far away as Hong-Kong and Norway.^{,}^{,}^{,}

=== Philanthropy ===
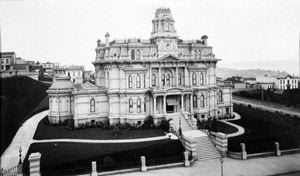
Charles Crocker's Second Empire-Italian Villa style mansion (1877), formerly at the N.W. corner of California & Taylor, San Francisco, now the site of Grace Cathedral

Following the 1906 earthquake and fire, which destroyed both William Henry Crocker’s mansion and his father Charles Crocker’s adjacent Nob Hill residence, Crocker donated the family’s 2.6-acre (11,000 m^{2}) Nob Hill block to the Episcopal Diocese in 1907 for Grace Cathedral.^{,}

He was a member of the University of California Board of Regents for nearly thirty years and funded the Lawrence Radiation Laboratory's million-volt x-ray tube at the UC hospital and the "medical" Crocker cyclotron used for neutron therapy at Berkeley. In 1936, Crocker contributed $75,000 toward the building of a laboratory for Ernest O. Lawrence at the University of California, Berkeley, which was subsequently named "Crocker Radiation Laboratory" in his honor. This laboratory became home to the Berkeley 60" cyclotron. In the 1960s, parts of this cyclotron were moved to the University of California, Davis, where they were the basis for the Crocker Nuclear Laboratory, which inherited its name from the original.

Crocker also chaired the Panama–Pacific Exposition Committee and SE Community Chest, and was a key member of the committee that built the San Francisco Opera House and Veterans Building. Crocker was the founder of Crocker Middle School located in Hillsborough, California. The Sacramento, California, home of Crocker's uncle, Edwin B. Crocker, was converted into the Crocker Art Museum, which was the first art museum to open in the West.

=== Art collection ===
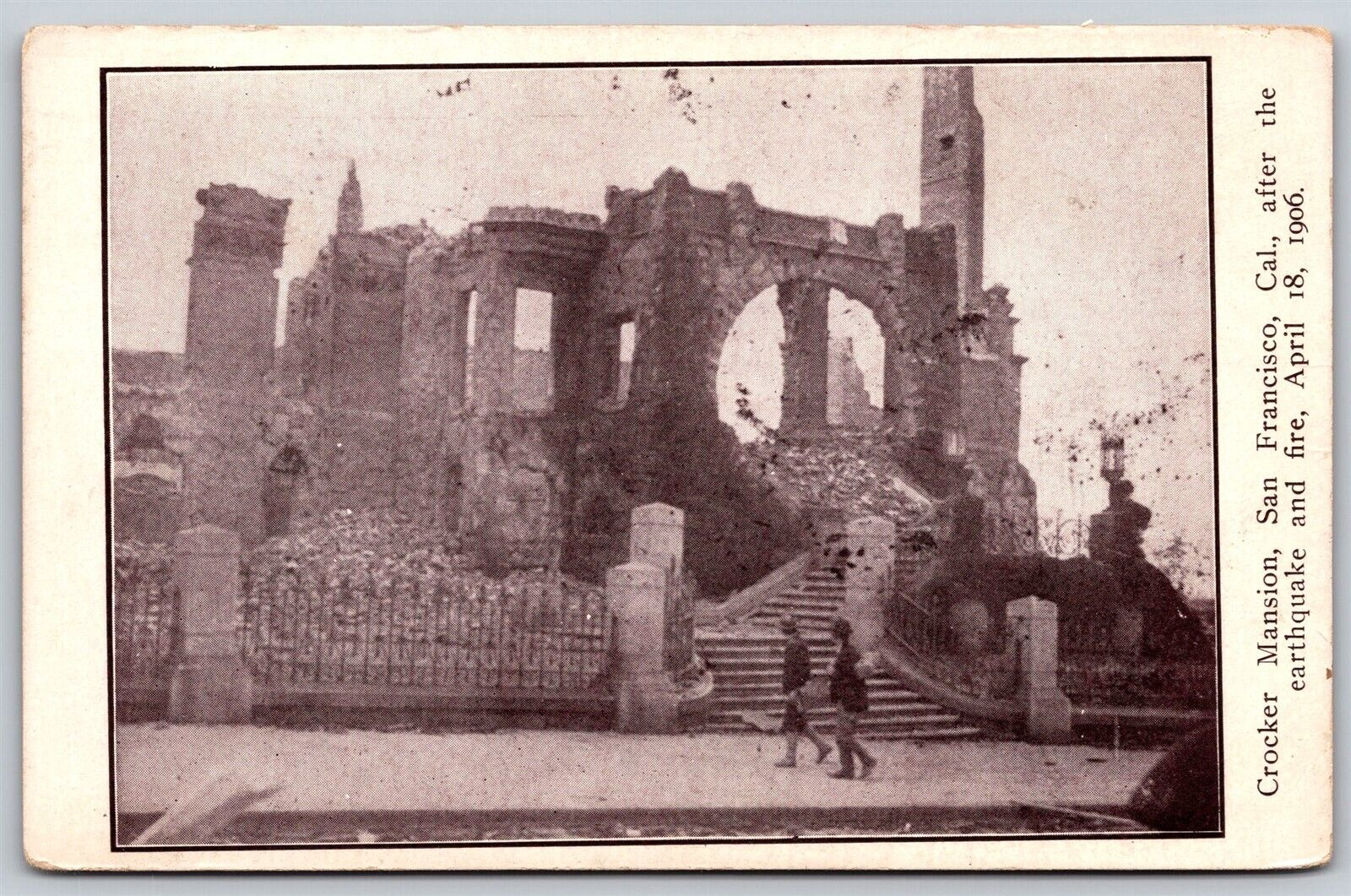
Postcard showing the Crocker Mansion destruction after San Francisco earthquake and Great Fire in 1906

During his lifetime William H. Crocker and his wife Ethel amassed a considerable collection of works of art.^{,}

One of the impressionist works they had acquired in 1894 was a painting by Claude Monet from his famous Haystacks series, "Meule, soir d'hiver", from 1899-1890 (W1217a) which was lost to eternity during the Great Fire following the 1906 earthquake in San Francisco, as was most of the rest of their collection.

Surviving items of Ethel's Egyptian and Byzantine textile collection were on loan to the San Francisco Museum of Art until 1953, when the collection was shipped to Dumbarton Oaks, Washington, D.C.^{,}

=== Philately ===
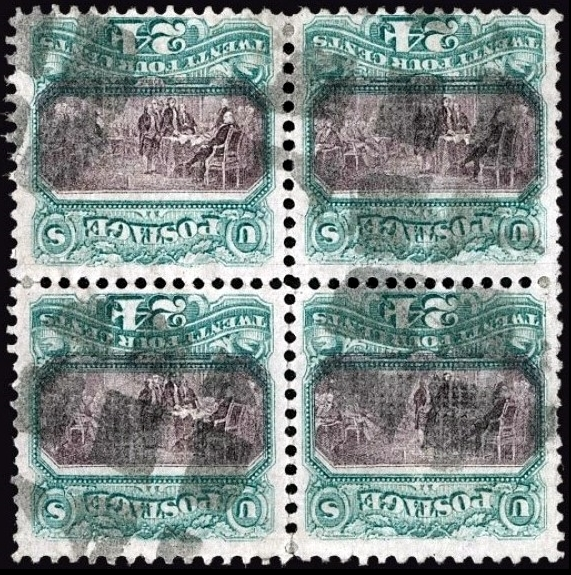
The block of four of the 1869 24c United States stamps with inverted centre owned by Crocker (shown inverted)

As his cousin, Henry J. Crocker, William H. Crocker was a noted philatelist and the owner of the unique block of four of the 1869 24c United States stamps with inverted centre formerly the property of William Thorne.

The stamp collection survived because it was on tour abroad at the time.

== Personal life ==
Crocker was married to Ethel Sperry (1861–1934), who become treasurer of the Woman's Belgian Relief Fund in San Francisco and State Chair for The Woman's Section of the Commission for Relief in Belgium (CRB), while William chaired the men's committee of the Belgian Relief Fund in San Francisco, who were to send the first "State Ship", the SS Camino, with food aid, on December 5, 1914, over to the port of Rotterdam, the Netherlands, which remained neutral during WWI. She was also the leading patron of French Impressionist art in California at that time.

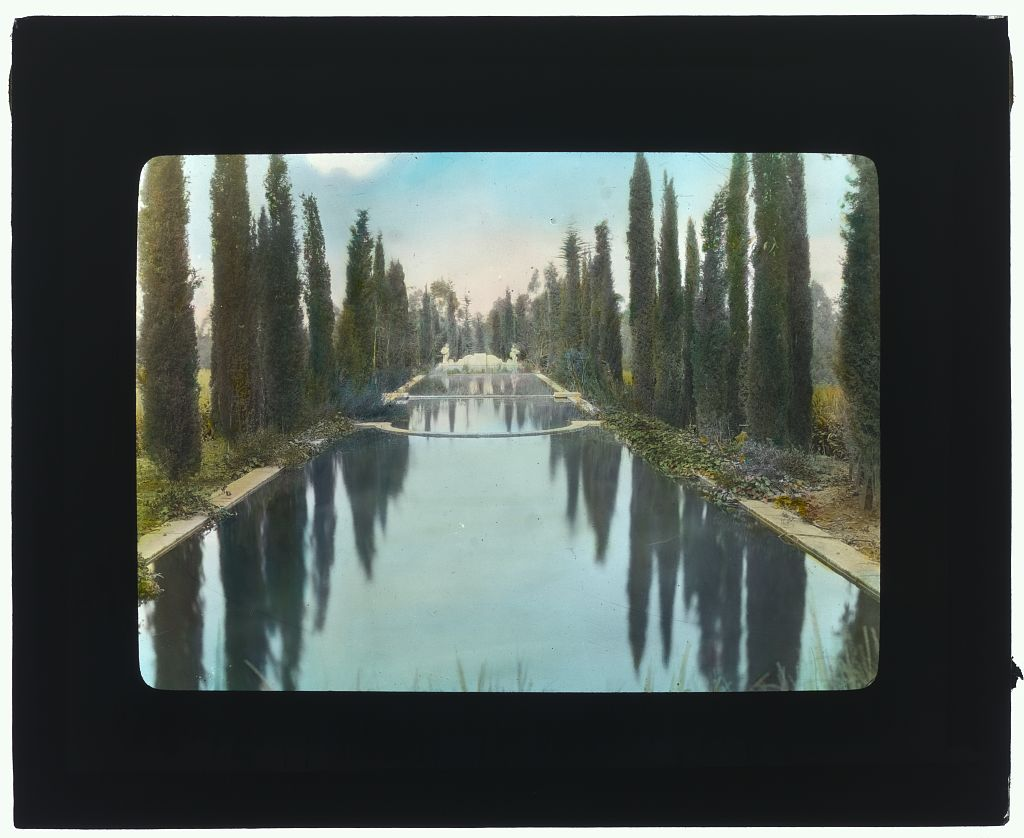
"New Place" (1910), William Henry Crocker house, 80 New Place Road, Hillsborough, California - hand-tinted slides by Frances Benjamin Johnston, digitized and added to the Library of Congress's online database

After the 1906 earthquake destroyed their San Francisco home, Crocker relocated the family to a new home in Hillsborough, California in 1910.^{,} The grand estate was aptly named "New Place", now part of the Burlingame Country Club clubhouse.^{,} The buildings were designed by Lewis P. Hobart, the lavish gardens by Bruce Potter. Some of the fragile original lantern slides on glass of the property by Frances Benjamin Johnston, an artist of the era, have survived to this day.

=== Children ===
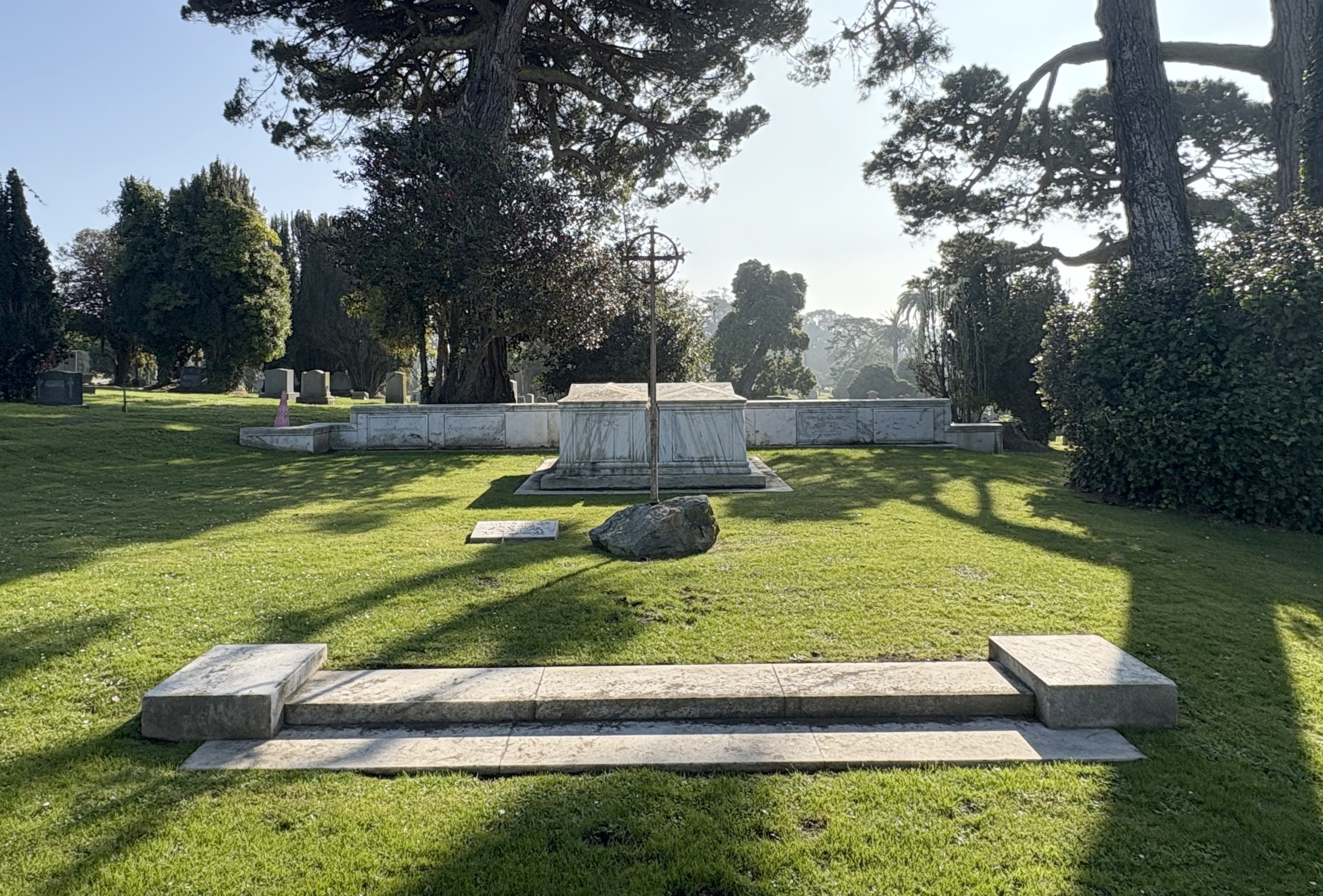
Crocker family plot at Cypress Lawn Memorial Park

Together, William and Ethel were the parents of four children:

- Ethel Mary Crocker (1891–1964), who married French (former) Count André de Limur in 1918, who gave William and Ethel their first grand-daughter.
- William Willard Crocker (1893–1964), who married Ruth Hobart, daughter of playboy Walter Hobart and granddaughter of the Comstock silver millionaire Walter S. Hobart, in 1923. They divorced in 1948 and he married Gertrude (née Hopkins) Parrott, former wife of William G. Parrott. After her death in 1958, he married Elizabeth (née Fullerton) Coleman, former wife of George L. Coleman, in 1960. After his death, she married Alexander Montagu, 10th Duke of Manchester.
- Helen Crocker (1897–1966), who married Henry Potter Russell, a son of Charles Howland Russell who was previously married to Ethel Borden Harriman.
- Charles Crocker (1904–1961), who married Virginia Bennett in 1926. They divorced and he married Marguerite Brokaw, a daughter of Howard Crosby Brokaw, in 1938. After his death, she married Charles Norton Adams.

William Crocker died on September 25, 1937, at his home in Hillsborough, California, and was buried at Cypress Lawn Memorial Park in Colma.

=== Legacy ===
The public middle school in Hillsborough, California, is named after him, Crocker Middle School.
