= Charles Crocker =

American railroad executive

- Portrait by I. W. Taber c. 1884
- Born: September 16, 1822; Troy, New York, U.S.
- Died: August 14, 1888 (aged 65); Monterey, California, U.S.
- Political party: Republican
- Spouse: Mary Ann Deming (m. 1852; died 1887)
- Children: 6, including Charles, George, William
- Relatives: Edwin B. Crocker (brother); Henry J. Crocker (nephew); Harry Crocker (grand-nephew)

Charles Crocker (September 16, 1822 – August 14, 1888) was an American railroad executive and founding patriarch of the Crocker business dynasty. He was a member of the "Big Four" who famously oversaw construction of the Central Pacific Railroad and purchased control of the Southern Pacific Railroad.

== Early years ==
Crocker was born in Troy, New York, on September 16, 1822. He was the son of Eliza (née Wright) and Isaac Crocker, a modest family. They joined the nineteenth-century migration west and moved to Indiana when he was 14, where they had a farm. Crocker soon became independent, working on several farms, a sawmill, and at an iron forge.

At the age of 23, in 1845, he founded a small, independent iron forge of his own. He used money saved from his earnings to invest later in the new railroad business after moving to California, which had become a boom state since the Gold Rush. His older brother Edwin B. Crocker had become an attorney by the time Crocker was investing in railroads.

== Founding a railroad ==
Portrait by Silas Selleck c. 1865

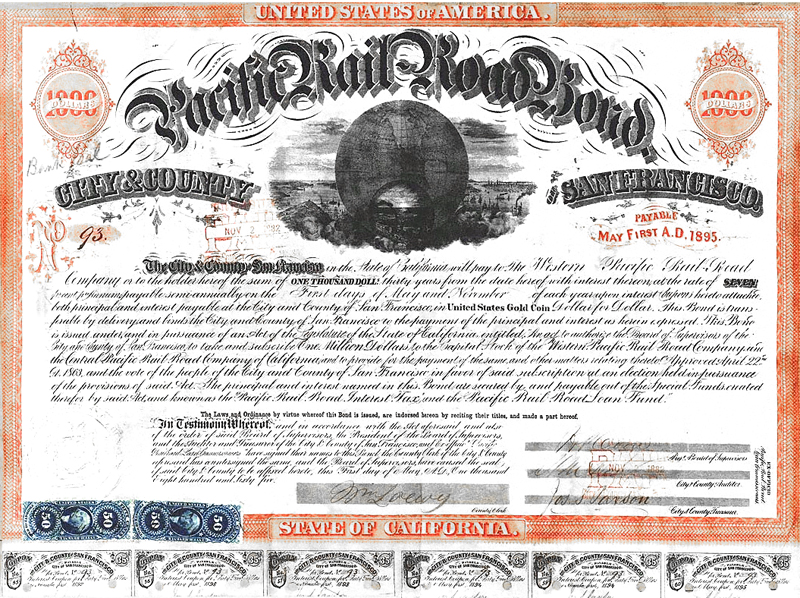
Pacific Railroad Bond, City and County of San Francisco, 1865

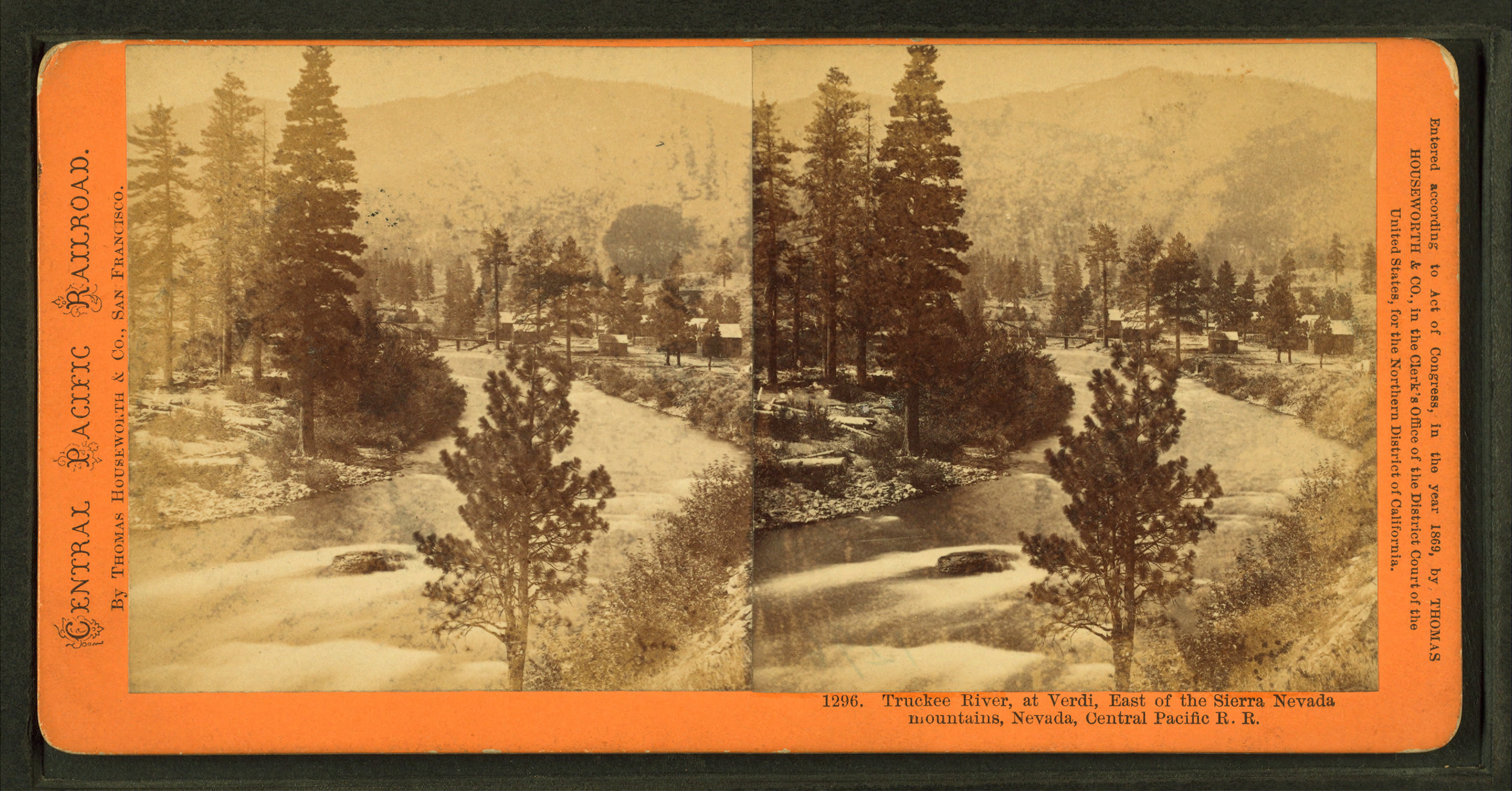
The Truckee River at Verdi, Nevada. When the Central Pacific Railroad reached the site in 1868, Charles Crocker pulled a slip of paper from a hat and read the name of Giuseppe Verdi; so, the town was named after the Italian opera composer.

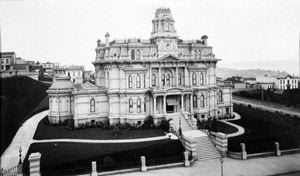
Charles Crocker's Second Empire-Italian Villa style mansion (1877), formerly at the N.W. corner of California & Taylor, on Nob Hill, San Francisco, now the site of Grace Cathedral.

In 1861, after hearing an intriguing presentation by Theodore Judah, he was one of the four principal investors, along with Mark Hopkins, Collis Huntington and Leland Stanford (also known as The Big Four), who formed the Central Pacific Railroad, which constructed the western portion of the First transcontinental railroad in North America. His position with the company was that of construction supervisor and president of Charles Crocker & Co., a Central Pacific subsidiary founded expressly for the purpose of building the railroad.

Crocker bought train plows to plow the tracks of snow through the mountains, but they derailed due to ice on the tracks. He had more than 40 miles (65 km) of snow sheds built to cover the tracks in the Sierra Nevada mountains, to prevent the tracks from getting covered with snow in the winter. This project cost over $2 million.

In 1864, Charles asked his older brother, Edwin B. Crocker, to serve as legal counsel for the Central Pacific Railroad.

While the Central Pacific was still under construction in 1868, Crocker and his three associates acquired control of the Southern Pacific Railroad. It built the westernmost portion of the second transcontinental railroad. Deming, New Mexico, is named after his wife, Mary Ann Deming Crocker. A silver spike was driven at Deming in 1881 to commemorate the meeting of the Southern Pacific with the Atchison, Topeka and Santa Fe railroads, completing the construction of the second transcontinental railroad in the United States. On September 5, 1876, at the Lang Southern Pacific Station, a California Historic Landmark, Crocker hammered a golden spike into a railroad tie, the ceremonial spike was driven to celebrate the completion of San Joaquin Valley rail line. The completion of the line connected the City of Los Angeles with San Francisco and First transcontinental railroad line.

=== Banking ===
Crocker was briefly the controlling shareholder of Wells Fargo in 1869 and served as president. After he sold down, he was replaced by John J. Valentine, Sr. Crocker also acquired controlling interest for his son William in Woolworth National Bank, which was renamed Crocker-Anglo Bank.

In 1963, Crocker-Anglo Bank merged with Los Angeles' Citizens National Bank, to become Crocker-Citizens Bank and later, Crocker National Bank. The San Francisco-based bank no longer exists, as it was acquired by Wells Fargo in 1986.

== Nob Hill and the 40 foot tall spite fence ==
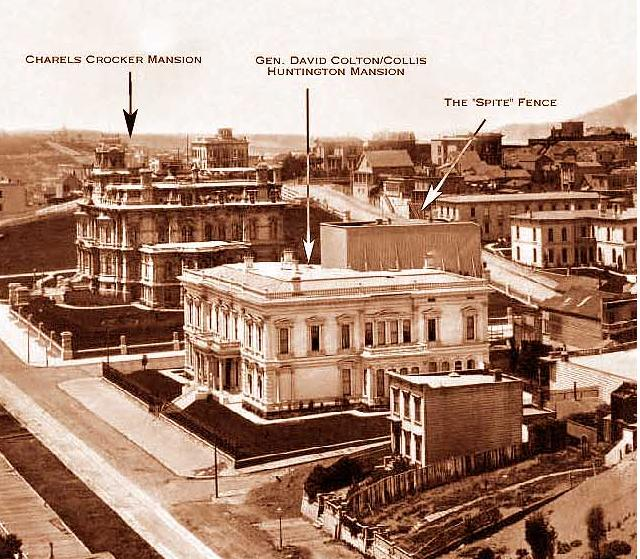
Nob Hill Spite fence

Crocker built a mansion on Nob Hill, San Francisco. When his attempts to buy Nicholas Yung's adjacent property were rebuffed, he built a 40-foot spite fence around three sides of the neighbor's property. Legal challenges to the fence were unavailing. The feud lasted many years, and the fence was only removed after the death of Mrs. Yung, and the sale of the property by Yung's heirs to Crocker's family. Spite fences were thereafter made illegal in San Francisco. The mansion was destroyed in the 1906 San Francisco earthquake. Though the disaster rendered the infamous dispute and its resolution moot, Crocker's family donated the entire block of land to charity, in support of the Episcopal Diocese of California. In 1910, in the same plot where the fence stood, the cornerstone was laid for Grace Cathedral.

== Personal life ==
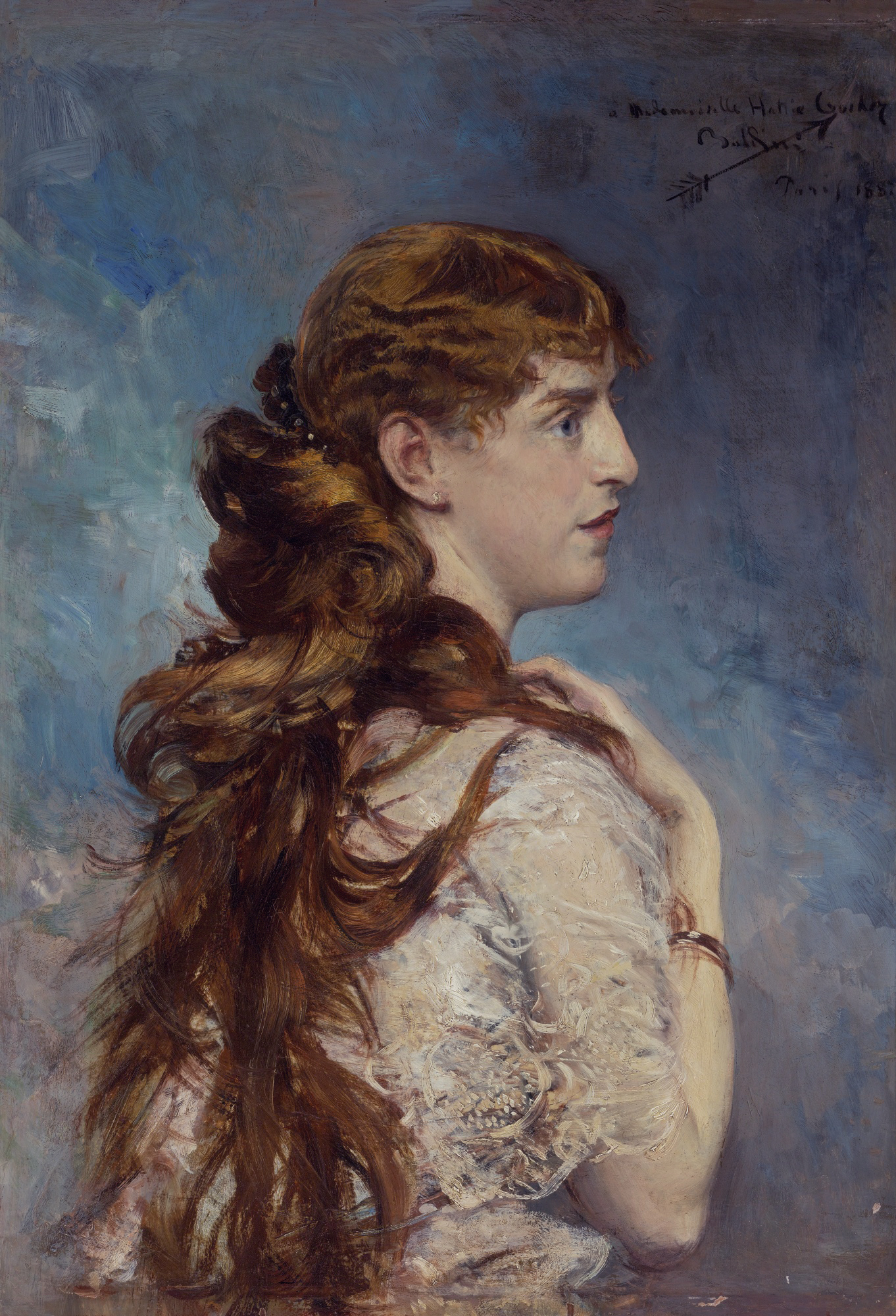
Painting of Crocker's daughter, Harriet, by Giovanni Boldini, 1887

In 1852, Crocker was married to Mary Ann Deming. Mary was the daughter of John Jay Deming and Emily (née Reed) Deming. Together, they had six children, four of whom survived to adulthood:

- Charles Frederick Crocker (1854–1897), who married Jennie Ella Easton (1858–1887).
- George Crocker (1856–1909), who married Emma Hanchett (1855–1904).
- Harriet Valentine Crocker (1859–1935), who married Charles Beatty Alexander (1849–1927).
- William Henry Crocker (1861–1937), who married Ethel Sperry (1861–1934).

Crocker was seriously injured in a New York City carriage accident in 1886, never fully recovered, and died two years later on August 14, 1888. He was buried in a mausoleum located on "Millionaire's Row" at Mountain View Cemetery in Oakland, California. The massive granite structure was designed by the New York architect A. Page Brown, who later designed the San Francisco Ferry Building. Crocker's estate has been valued at between $300 million and $400 million at the time of his death in 1888.

During his lifetime Charles Crocker amassed a considerable collection of works of art.

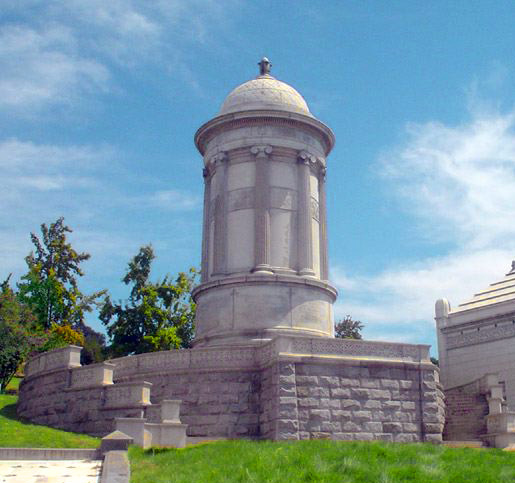
Crocker's tomb in Mountain View Cemetery

=== Honors ===
Mount Crocker is named in his honor. It is located in California's Sierra Nevada mountains.

The SS Charles Crocker, a Liberty Ship built in World War II, was named for him.

== See also ==
- Crocker family
- List of people associated with the California Gold Rush
