= Mstislav Galitzine =

Russian prince

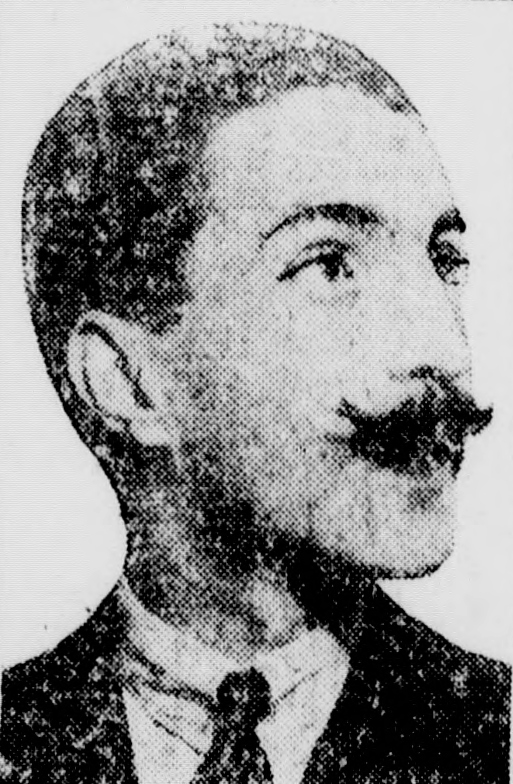
Prince Galatzine (Galitzine), 5th husband of Aimée Crocker

Mstislav Galitzine, Count Osterman (21 January 1899-28 February 1966), was a Russian prince belonging to the House of Golitsyn.

== Life ==
Mstislav Galitzine was born in Kyiv as the son of Alexander Mstislavovich Golitsyn and Anastasia Aleksandrovna Komovskaya.

Mstislav Alexandrovich studied mathematics, engineering, economics, and was fond of politics. He joined Alexander Kolchak after the October Revolution but it is unclear if completed his education at the Page Corps; the sources disagree. From Siberia, he fled to Harbin (China) and from there to Paris, where he founded an anti-Bolshevik club. He became a member of the monarchist party "Action Française". He was friendly with the author Dmitry Merezhkovsky, his wife, the poet Zinaida Gippius and Ivan Lebedeff.

On 22 September 1925, he married the California mystic, author and heiress Aimée Crocker. She was 61 and it was her fifth marriage. She offered him $250 a month if he would marry her in exchange for the right to call herself a princess. Two years later they divorced. He was forced to pay all the court costs of the suit.

On 27 September 1927, Galitzine got married again in Neuilly-Plaisance to Clarisse Biot of Vieuxville. He gave lectures on psychology, esotericism (Gurdjieff and Ouspensky), astronomy, and dream interpretation. During World War II Galitzine lived in Saint-Jean-de-Luz, a seaside resort at the Bay of Biscay in the Basque province, but died in Paris.

== Family ==
His only daughter Maria (1928-1998) died without offspring. His brother was Leo Alexandrovich Galitzine (1905–1969) who escaped from Soviet Russia and came to settle in Canada by 1929 in Edson, Alberta. He and his wife, Marguerite Therese Reynaud-Carcasse, purchased 420 acres of land, mostly bordering the McLeod River. The Galitzines started an airplane charter company at Great Bear Lake. After his wife died (in Alexandria in 1934), Leo moved to Hollywood where he was acting in various films as an extra, including in The Razor's Edge and The Chocolate Soldier. He was the last member of the family to bear the Osterman surname.
