= Charles M. Fassett =

Mayor of Spokane, Washington

Charles Fassett

22nd Mayor of Spokane
- In office 1918–1920
- Preceded by: Charles Fleming
- Succeeded by: Charles Fleming
- In office 1914–1916
- Preceded by: William Hindley
- Succeeded by: Charles Fleming

Personal details
- Born: December 23, 1858 Elmira, New York, U.S.
- Died: August 11, 1923 (aged 64) Kootenai County, Idaho
- Spouse(s): Edith May Benham (m.1884–1923, his death)
- Children: 1 daughter, 1 son
- Education: Elmira Free Academy
- Occupation: Chemist, businessman

Charles Marvin Fassett (December 23, 1858 – August 10, 1923) was an American businessman and politician. He was the mayor of Spokane, Washington (1914–1916, 1918–1920), and author of works advocating the commission style of city government.

== Education and business career ==
Originally from Elmira, New York, Fassett graduated from Elmira Free Academy, influenced by teacher Joel Dorman Steele to become a chemist. After briefly working as a pharmacist in Elmira, he moved west to Nevada at Reno, then at Eureka, working as a chemist, drug store owner, and assayer. Late in 1889, he relocated north to Spokane, Washington, and opened C. M. Fassett & Co, assayers and chemists, which became one of the most prominent of such businesses in the Inland Empire.

Fassett also served as consultant to mining companies, including directing the building of the first cyanide leach gold mill in Korea in 1900. He was supported financially by his cousin, Congressman Jacob Sloat Fassett of New York, whose son Newton was partner and briefly manager of the firm when Charles Fassett became involved in local politics.

== Government service ==
During the 1880s, Fassett served a term in the Nevada State Assembly and served as chief clerk at sessions in Carson City. In Spokane, Fassett became an advocate of clean politics and governance as exemplified by the commission style of city government, a typical Progressive Era reformer. With him leading the fight to change Spokane to a commission government, he became one of the first city commissioners in the spring of 1911. He was elected mayor and served December 1914 to January 1916 and again January 1918 to January 1920.

His books on commission style government -- Assets of the Ideal City and Handbook of Municipal Government—include descriptions of his service in Spokane. After leaving office, he became a professor on municipal government at the University of Kansas in Lawrence, which was his final residence.

== Death ==
On August 10, 1923, Fassett died at age 64 of an apparent heart attack while vacationing at his summer home on the banks of Spirit Lake in Kootenai County, Idaho, not far from Spokane. He had just returned by his motorboat from delivering a eulogy for President Warren G. Harding at Spirit Lake's Tesemini club.

== Personal ==
Fassett married Edith May Benham of Reno, daughter of a Spokane pioneer, on January 1, 1884; they had a daughter and a son.
