= Ethel Sperry Crocker =

American philanthropist and arts patron (1861–1934)

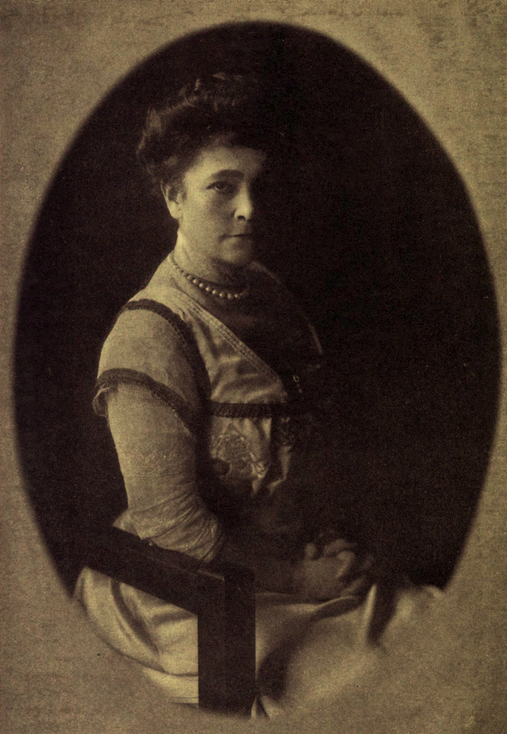
Portrait photo from Problems Women Solved (1915)

Ethel Sperry Crocker (1861–1934) was an American philanthropist and art patron. In her day, she was the leading patron of French Impressionism in California.

== Biography ==
Ethel Willard Sperry was born in Stockton, California, in 1861. Her parents were Simon Willard Sperry and Caroline Elizabeth (née Barker) Sperry, from Stockton, California, and sister to Elizabeth Helen Sperry (wife of Prince André Poniatowski).

On October 6, 1886, she married William Henry Crocker, a member of the wealthy Crocker family and a prominent member of the Republican Party. Over the course of his business career, he became the president of Crocker National Bank.

Ethel and other family members owned the Sperry Flour Company, which was heavily invested in the World War I humanitarian effort by sending its flour across the ocean to aid famine-stricken citizens of Belgium. Encouraged by Lou Henry Hoover, wife of the later President Herbert Hoover, Crocker became treasurer of the Woman's "Belgian Relief Fund" in San Francisco and State Chair for the Woman's Section of the Commission for Relief in Belgium (CRB).

On another level, Crocker was the leading patron of French Impressionist art in California at that time. In the 1890s, Crocker and California Impressionist Lucy Bacon lent William Kingston Vickery, owner of the San Francisco art gallery Vickery, Atkins & Torrey, several French Impressionist paintings. Vickery then supervised a series of these loan exhibitions in San Francisco and introduced Impressionism to California in the form of paintings by Claude Monet, Eugène Boudin, Paul Cézanne, Camille Pissarro, Pierre-Auguste Renoir, and Edgar Degas. Crocker also sponsored the studies of the Zoellner Quartet with César Thomson in Belgium.

== Personal life ==
Ethel and William were the parents of four children:

- Ethel Mary Crocker (1891–1964) married in 1918 French Count André de Limur (who became an American citizen in 1942 and joined the US Army), who gave William and Ethel their first granddaughter.
- William Willard Crocker (1893–1964) married Ruth Hobart, daughter of playboy Walter Hobart and granddaughter of the Comstock silver millionaire Walter S. Hobart, in 1923. They divorced in 1948 and he married Gertrude (née Hopkins) Parrott, former wife of William G. Parrott. After her death in 1958, he married Elizabeth (née Fullerton) Coleman, former wife of George L. Coleman, in 1960.
- Helen Crocker (1897–1966) married Henry Potter Russell, the son of Charles Howland Russell who had previously married Ethel Borden.
- Charles Crocker (1904–1961) married Virginia Bennett in 1926. They divorced and he married Marguerite Brokaw, a daughter of Howard Crosby Brokaw, in 1938.

She was a member of the Daughters of the American Revolution.

Ethel Sperry Crocker died in Hillsborough, California, on July 21, 1934.

== See also ==
- Man with a Hoe – Jean-François Millet painting, 1860–62
