= Jennie Louise Crocker Fassett =

American heiress

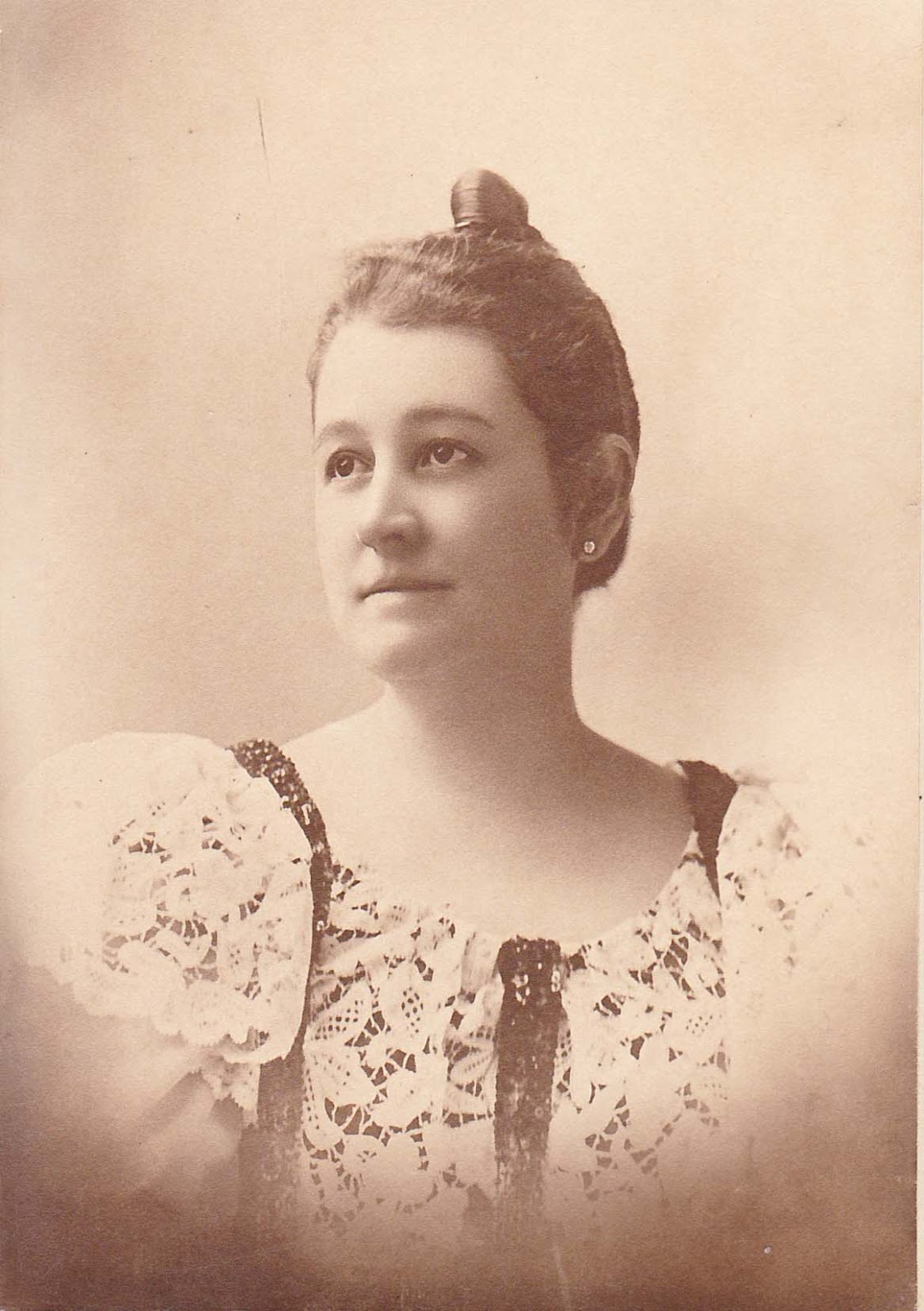
- Jennie Crocker, 1898
- Born: Jennie Louise Crocker; May 2, 1860; Sacramento, California, US
- Died: November 17, 1939 (aged 79); Katonah, New York, US
- Resting place: Woodlawn Cemetery, Elmira, New York, US
- Spouse: Jacob Sloat Fassett (m. 1879; died 1924)

Jennie Louise Crocker Fassett (1860 – 1939) was an American heiress, known for her philanthropy to the Crocker Art Museum in Sacramento, California.

== Biography ==
Born on May 2, 1860, in Sacramento, California, Fassett was the daughter of the California Supreme Court Justice Edwin B. Crocker and Margaret Rhodes Crocker. Her younger sister was the notorious Bohemian Aimée Crocker. She married lawyer and politician Jacob Sloat Fassett in 1879 and the couple moved to his hometown of Elmira, New York. They were frequent travelers and were among the first people from the west to enter the Royal Court of Korea, visiting there in 1912. She collected jade, ivory, sculpture, and ceramics from Korea.

Their children were Bryant, a physician; Newton; Truman; Jacob Sloat, Jr.; Jennie; and Margaret. She and her husband had a Queen Anne style house, designed by Robert Bickford, built for the family. After her husband's death, she had the large house, called the Strathmont mansion, renovated into separate living spaces for herself and her secretary and his wife.

She received an honorary degree from Elmira College. The Doctor of Humane Letters was awarded in 1933. She died on November 17, 1939 in Katonah, New York. She was buried at Woodlawn Cemetery in Elmira.

== Philanthropy ==
Her parents had founded the Crocker Art Museum and Fassett was a long time champion of the family's art gallery. In 1911, she contributed $10,000 so the city could purchase the Crocker house, which was then used for offices and to expand the gallery space. Fassett donated a $25,000 (equivalent to $457,800 in 2024) trust fund and her Asian art collection to the museum in 1928.

A leader in the Elmira community, she founded, led, and contributed to the Elmira Federation for Social Service, including the construction of its building. She frequently donated to causes domestically and internationally, including to Elmira College.
