= Henry J. Crocker =

American businessman (1861–1912)

Henry Joseph Crocker
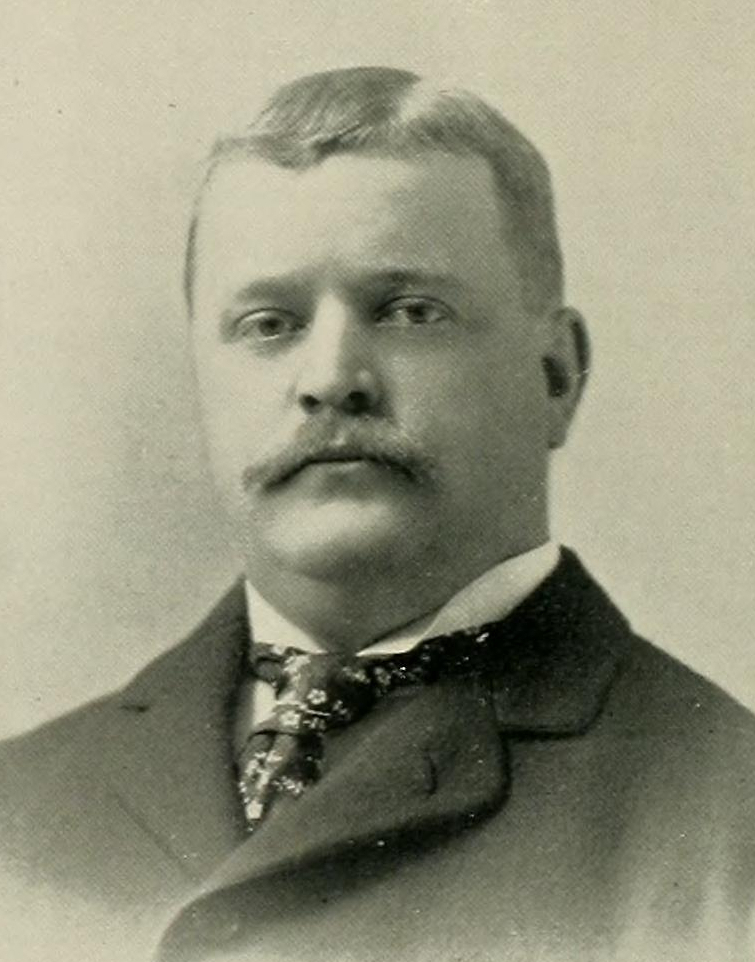
- Crocker c. 1896
- Born: 1861; Sacramento, California, US
- Died: October 11, 1912 (aged 51); San Francisco, California, US
- Occupation: Businessman
- Spouse: Mary Virginia Ives (1863–1929)
- Children: 6, including Harry Crocker

Henry J. Crocker (1861 – 11 October 1912) was a prominent San Franciscan businessman and member of the wealthy Crocker family. In addition to being a noted philatelist, he was one of the Committee of Fifty formed after the 1906 San Francisco earthquake.

== Personal life ==
Crocker was born in Sacramento in 1861 and moved to San Francisco in 1874. He was the son of Clark W. Crocker and a nephew of Charles Crocker, a railway magnate. Crocker had one brother and three sisters, one of whom (Lizzie Eldridge) married the prominent judge William Cary Van Fleet in 1887.

Crocker and his wife, Mary Virginia (née Ives, 1863–1929) were married in 1889 and had six children: four daughters (Florence, Marion, Kate, and Mary) and two sons (Harry and Clark). Florence Crocker did not survive to adulthood. Kate Crocker was a victim of the 1918 flu pandemic.

He fell ill during the summer of 1910, which he was spending at his farm in Cloverdale, but was not moved to a hospital in San Francisco in October, where he died on October 11.

== Career ==
In 1879 he started work with Sisson, Wallace & Co., beginning a successful business career that lead to directorships of numerous firms and the acquisition of great wealth. He was President of the Central Gaslight Company and a Director of the San Francisco Stockyards. He and his wife, Mary Ives Crocker, owned large estates in California including a winery.

In 1898, Crocker was one of the founders of The West Side Flume & Lumber Company.

Crocker was President of the American National Bank and the Refining and Producing Oil Company of San Francisco. Crocker sued his cousin William Henry in 1902, alleging that William and William's brother-in-law, Prince André Poniatowski, had fraudulently acquired Henry's interests in the Pacific Coast Jockey Club and the Western Turf Association. Crocker brought a separate suit against Poniatowski in October. The suit between the Crocker cousins was dismissed in November. However, in apparent retaliation, William and Poniatowski forced him out of the board of directors of the Sierra Railway Company in April 1903.

=== Politics ===
In 1903, he stood for the office of Mayor of San Francisco, but was unsuccessful. Crocker, a Republican, was selected to run in September and was leading the race in the weeks leading up to the November election. In public appearances, Crocker was greeted by adoring crowds, giving him confidence he would defeat incumbent Mayor Eugene Schmitz of the Union Labor Party. Crocker's popularity was demonstrated in the days before the election, with a parade that attracted thousands and numerous endorsements from union labor officials and local businessmen. When Schmitz was re-elected, the San Francisco Call blamed the unsuccessful campaign of Democrat Franklin K. Lane for splitting the anti-Schmitz vote.

Following the 1906 San Francisco earthquake, Crocker was named to the Committee of Fifty, a group of prominent citizens formed by Mayor Schmitz to deal with the crisis.

== Philately ==
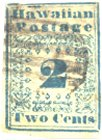
A 2c Hawaiian Missionary stamp of 1851

Crocker was one of the founders of the Pacific Philatelic Society in 1884.

He had a notable collection of the famous Hawaiian Missionary stamps, the first stamps of Hawaii. Part of Crocker's collection was destroyed in the 1906 earthquake but important Missionary stamps were saved as they were on display in Britain at the time. Crocker was named a Fellow of the Royal Philatelic Society of London by King Edward VII in 1907.

Crocker was entered on the Roll of Distinguished Philatelists in 1921 as one of the "Fathers of Philately".

== Other interests ==
Crocker was an equestrian, he was one of the founders of the Pacific Jockey Club and was credited with restoring the fortunes of the San Francisco Olympic Club, of which he was elected president in 1891. His club memberships were numerous including The Family, the Pacific Union Club and others. He was a Free Mason and described as a "Knight Templar" and a Native Son. A section of a stained glass window is dedicated to his memory at the Grace Cathedral in San Francisco.

== Publications ==
- Hawaiian Numerals a Compilation of Unofficial Data Relating to the Type-Set Stamps of the Kingdom of Hawaii. San Francisco: Henry J. Crocker, 1909.
