= Jacob Sloat Fassett =

American politician (1853–1924)

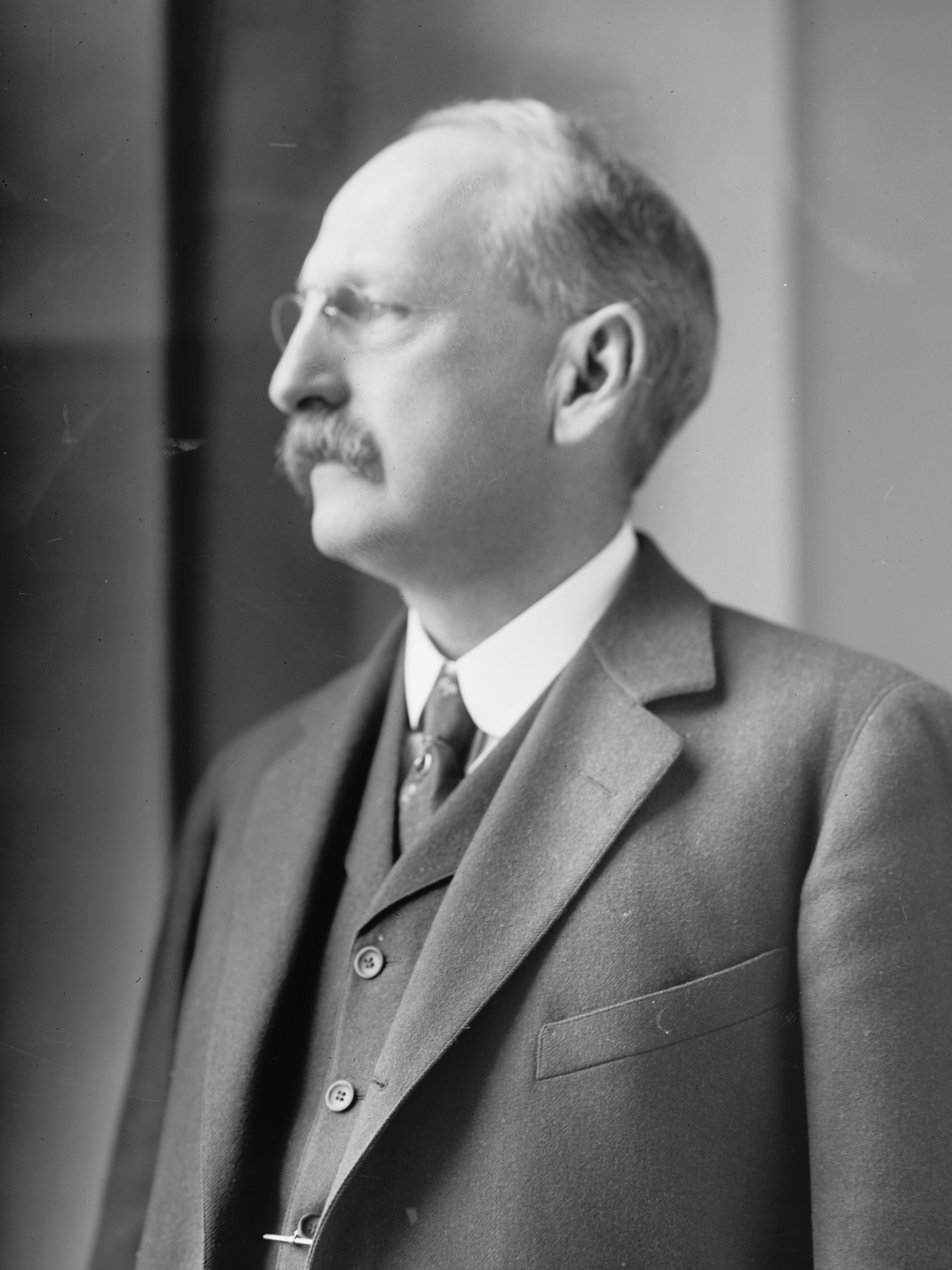
- Fassett, 1905–1924

Member of the U.S. House of Representatives from New York's 33rd district
- In office March 4, 1905 – March 3, 1911
- Preceded by: Charles W. Gillet
- Succeeded by: Edwin S. Underhill

Member of the New York Senate from the 27th district
- In office January 1, 1884 – December 31, 1891
- Preceded by: Sumner Baldwin
- Succeeded by: Charles E. Walker

Personal details
- Born: November 13, 1853 Elmira, New York, United States
- Died: April 21, 1924 (aged 70) Vancouver, British Columbia, Canada
- Party: Republican Party
- Spouse: Jennie Louise Crocker Fassett
- Education: University of Rochester

Jacob Sloat Fassett (November 13, 1853 – April 21, 1924) was a businessman, lawyer, and member of the United States House of Representatives from New York.

== Early life ==
He was born on November 13, 1853, in Elmira, New York, the son of Newton Pomeroy Fassett and Martha Ellen (Sloat) Fassett. He attended the public schools of Elmira and graduated from the University of Rochester in 1875. He studied law at his father's firm, Smith, Robertson & Fassett, was admitted to the bar in 1878 and commenced practice in Elmira. He was District Attorney of Chemung County in 1878 and 1879. On February 13, 1879, he married in Sacramento, California, Jennie Louise Crocker (1860–1939), the daughter of Judge Edwin B. Crocker. Around this time Fassett became the proprietor of the Elmira Daily Advertiser. Afterwards he enrolled as a law student at Heidelberg University in Germany. He returned to Elmira in 1882 and began the practice of law.

== Political career ==
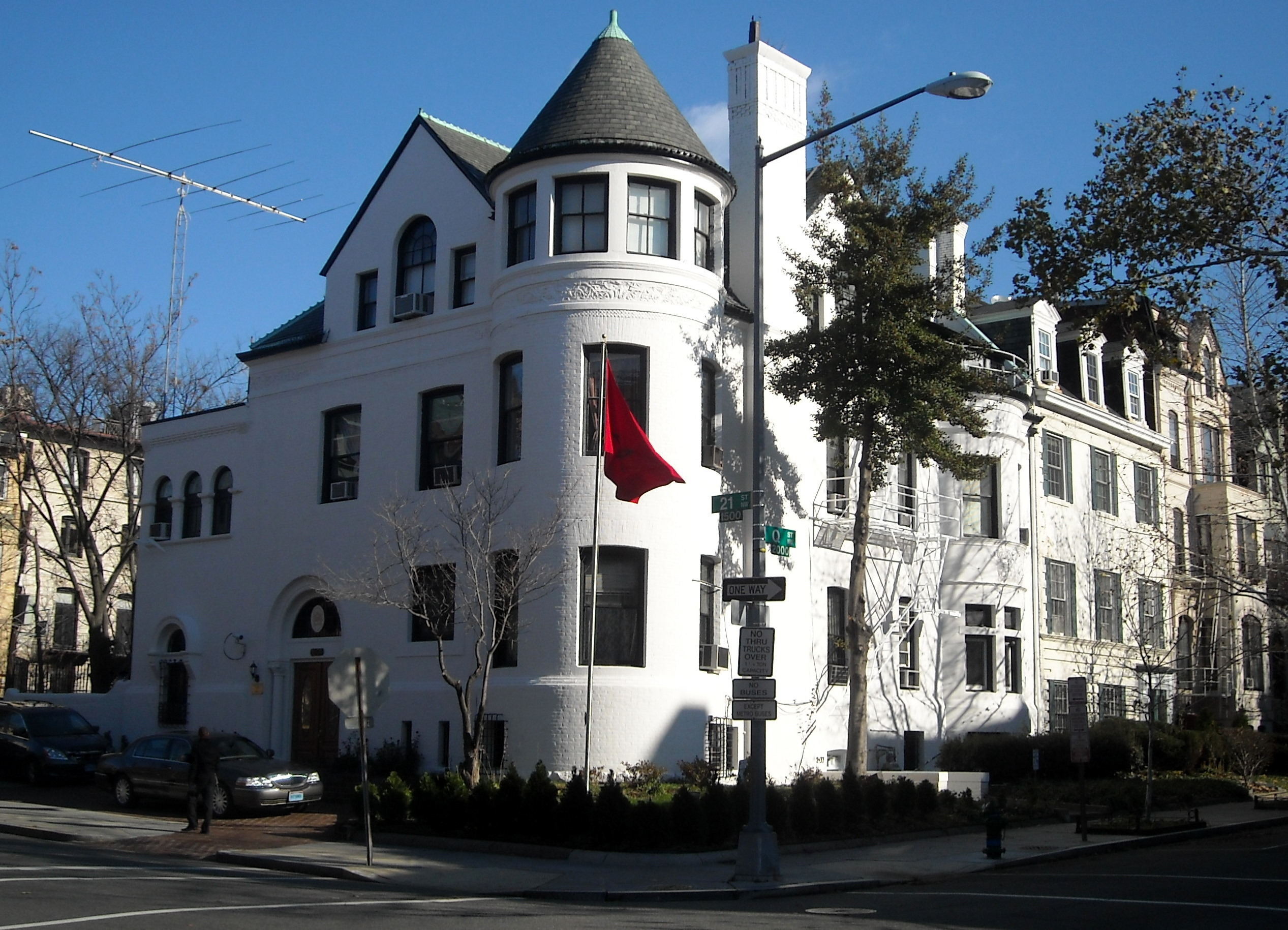
Fassett's residence in Washington, D.C., while serving in the U.S. House of Representatives

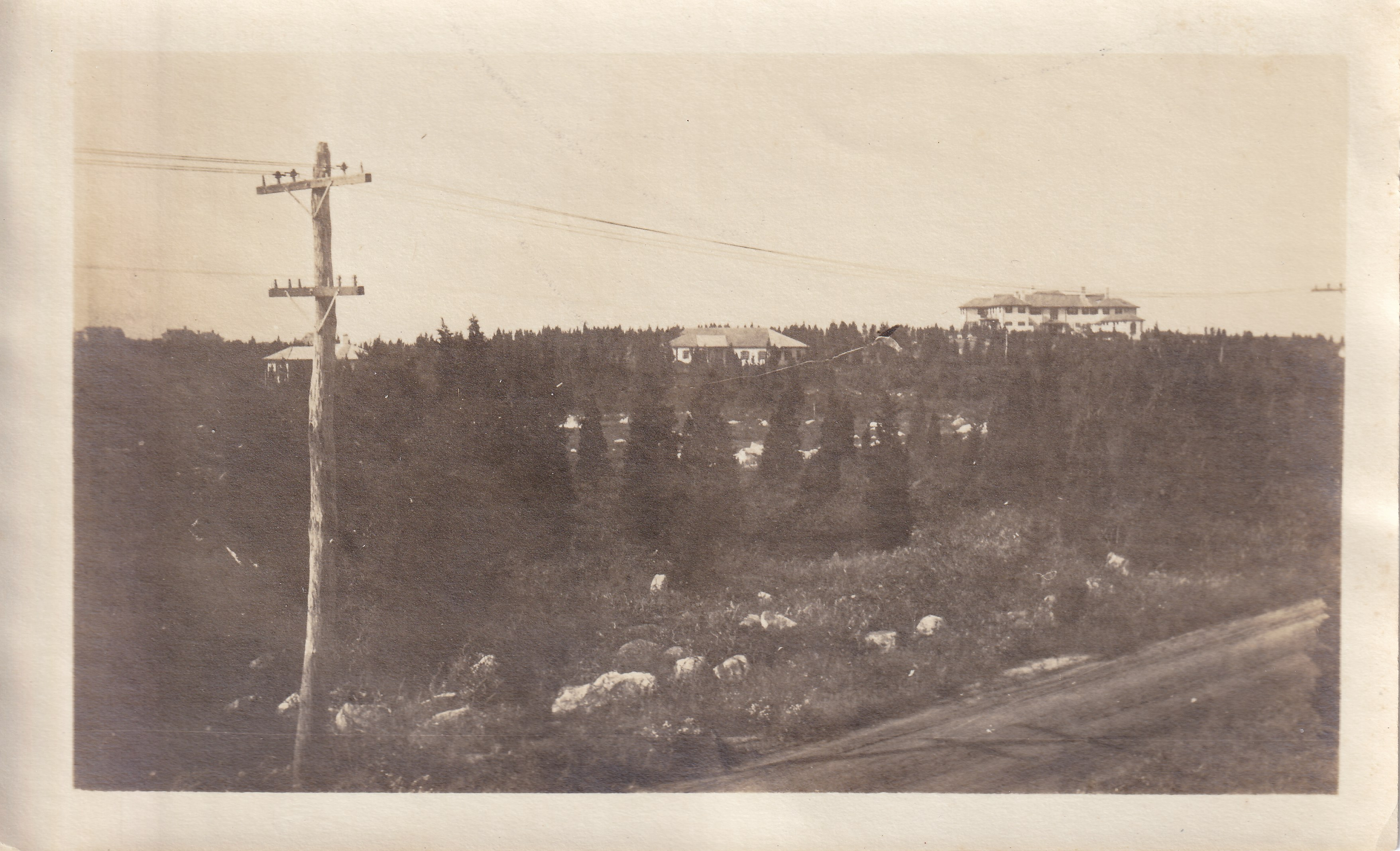
Greycourt, West Falmouth, MA, view from Wright Street and Little Island Road

Fassett was a member of the New York State Senate (27th D.) from 1884 to 1891, sitting in the 107th, 108th, 109th, 110th, 111th, 112th, 113th and 114th New York State Legislatures; and was President pro tempore from 1889 to 1891. He was a delegate to the 1880, 1892 and 1916 Republican National Conventions, and was Temporary Chairman in 1892. He was Secretary of the Republican National Committee from 1888 to 1892. President Benjamin Harrison appointed Fassett as Collector of the Port of New York, a post he held from August 1 to September 15, 1891, when he resigned to run for Governor of New York. At the 1891 New York state election, he was defeated by Democrat Roswell P. Flower.

Fassett was a delegate to the New York State Constitutional Convention of 1894. He was elected as a Republican to the 59th, 60th and 61st United States Congresses, holding office from March 4, 1905, to March 3, 1911. His last political role was as Chairman of the Republican advisory convention in 1918.

After retiring from politics, he resumed his work in the banking and lumber business in Elmira. He died on April 21, 1924, in Vancouver, British Columbia, Canada, while returning from a business trip to Japan and the Philippines. He was an investor in various mines among which was the Oriental Consolidated Mining Corporation in Korea, which was managed by his cousin, Spokane politician and metallurgist Charles M. Fassett. He was buried at the Woodlawn Cemetery in Elmira.

== Legacy ==
=== SS Jacob Sloat Fassett ===
In World War II, the United States Liberty ship SS Jacob Sloat Fassett was named in his honor.

=== Fassett, Quebec ===
The village of Fassett, Quebec, in Canada is named after him.

=== Fassett's Point ===
Located in Falmouth, Massachusetts, this 40-acre (160,000 m^{2}) portion of land on the north side of West Falmouth Harbor is divided into two portions: 12 acres (49,000 m^{2}) which comprise "Little Island" and the other 28 acres (110,000 m^{2}) are known as "Greycourt." It was here on the 28 acres (110,000 m^{2}) of Greycourt at the end of Little Island Road in Falmouth, Massachusetts, where Jacob and his wife Jennie Crocker Fassett built a large summer estate in 1916 - 1918. (The Fassetts had been spending their summers in Gloucester at Cape Ann but sold their estate there in 1916 for $225,000 in what was called "One of the largest real estate deals ever recorded on Cape Ann"). After his death and then that of his wife in 1939, the estate was put up for sale for $35,000. By 1941 it had still not sold and their children had the estate destroyed and the land divided. Some of his descendants still live on the land of this great estate.

=== Fassett Elementary School ===
Elementary School in Elmira, New York.

=== Fassett Commons ===
In 1916, Mr. and Mrs. Jacob Fassett donated $30,000 to Elmira College for the construction of a dining hall. It became the main dining hall in 1917. It is connected to the north arm of Cowles Hall. Jacob Fassett favored the name Crocker Hall, opposing the choice of Fassett Commons. When construction costs grew beyond expectations, the Fassetts donated an additional $10,000. Faculty members of the art department have their offices in Fassett Commons, which is listed on the National Register of Historic Places.

=== Fassett Family ===
Although Jacob Sloat Fassett and Jennie Crocker had several children (one of whom was a doctor), none of them went into politics like their father. Their most famous child was Jacob Sloat Fassett Jr. (1889–1973) or better known by his stage name as Jay Fassett who starred in several Hollywood films. Jay Fassett had a son, Jacob Sloat Fassett, III (1913–2002) who, like his father Jay, graduated from Cornell and then went into the hotel business buying a 50-room hotel in upstate New York when he was just 26 years old. Jacob Sloat Fassett, III lived his remaining years on what was left of the estate in West Falmouth. The Congressman and his son Newton Crocker Fassett were partners in mining ventures with Spokane mayor Charles M. Fassett, a cousin of Jacob Sloat Fassett.

Kaffe Fassett is a well-known artist and designer living in London. He is the great-grandson of Jacob Sloat Fassett.

== Sources ==
Portions of the text on this page were adapted from the public domain Biographical Directory of the United States Congress. OCMC: Chosen Gold - TIME magazine "Chosen Gold". Time. September 11, 1939. Archived from the original on October 23, 2012.

Party political offices
| Preceded by Warner Miller | Republican nominee for Governor of New York; 1891 | Succeeded by Levi P. Morton |
New York State Senate
| Preceded by Sumner Baldwin | New York State Senate; 27th District; 1884–1891 | Succeeded by Charles E. Walker |
Political offices
| Preceded by Henry R. Low | President pro tempore of the New York State Senate; 1889–1891 | Succeeded by Jacob A. Cantor |
U.S. House of Representatives
| Preceded by Charles W. Gillet | Member of the U.S. House of Representatives from New York's 33rd congressional district 1905–1911 | Succeeded by Edwin S. Underhill |
