= Crocker National Bank =

Former United States bank

Logo of the Crocker Bank prior to its merger with Wells Fargo Bank

Crocker National Bank was an American bank headquartered in San Francisco, California. It was acquired by and merged into Wells Fargo Bank in 1986.

== History ==
The bank traces its history to the Woolworth National Bank in San Francisco. Charles Crocker, who was one of The Big Four of the Central Pacific Railroad and the head of construction for the western half of America's first transcontinental railroad, acquired a controlling interest in Woolworth for his son William Henry Crocker. The bank was renamed Crocker Woolworth National Bank, later Crocker National Bank.

In 1925, Crocker National merged with the First National Bank of San Francisco, founded by James D. Phelan, to form Crocker First National Bank.

In 1956, Crocker First National Bank merged with the Anglo California National Bank (established by Herbert Fleishhacker) to form Crocker-Anglo Bank. In 1963, Crocker-Anglo Bank merged with Los Angeles' Citizens National Bank, to become Crocker-Citizens Bank. and later, Crocker Bank.

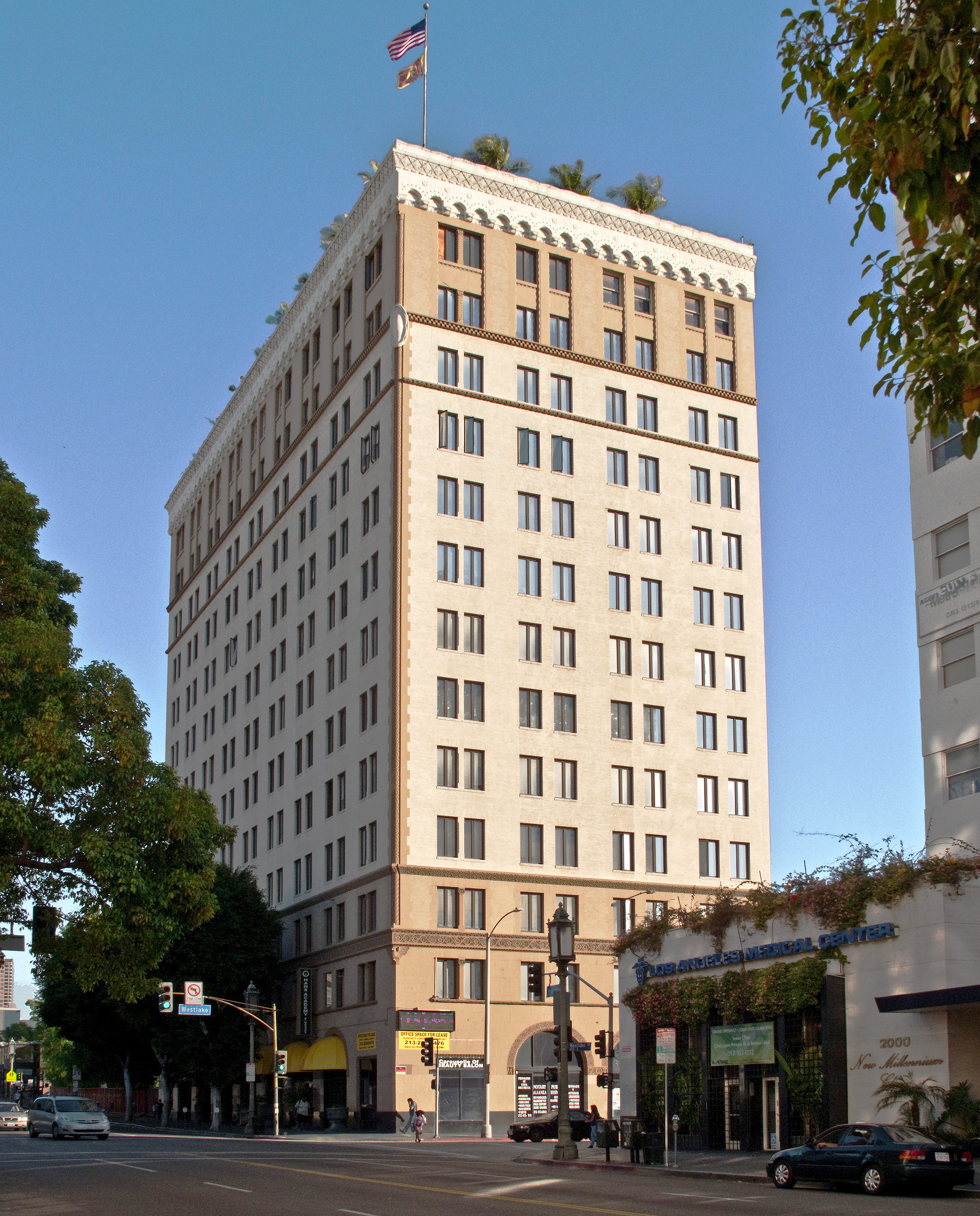
Crocker Bank building, Los Angeles

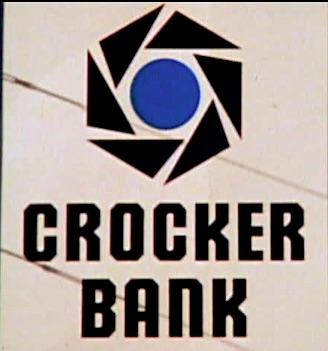
Picture of the Crocker Bank logo, as shown on a bank branch sign in the 1970s

The song "We've Only Just Begun" was originally commissioned by advertising agent Hal Riney for an advertisement for Crocker that ran in early 1970. The commercial was intended to help Crocker appeal to young people. The song, written Paul Williams (lyrics) and Roger Nichols (music) and sung by Williams, played over footage of a couple getting married and just starting out. Direct reference to the bank was left out, in part to make the song more marketable. The commercial turned out to be very popular, but it attracted customers in which the bank was not interested: young adult customers with no collateral to use for loans. The campaign was eventually suspended, and Crocker subsequently franchised it to other banks.

In the 1970s and early 1980s, Crocker cultivated a reputation for customer service and convenience, including expanded hours. As a part of its promotional campaign, the bank gave various stuffed animals to new customers, including "Sunny", a teddy bear, "Crocker" Spaniel stuffed dogs, and a set of stuffed circus animal "Crockers".

It was also one of the first California banks to offer automated teller machine service. One early television commercial showed a young businessman confidently using the machine, while speaking to it as if it were a person. He was followed by an elderly woman approaching it for the first time, and greeting it with a very uncertain "Hello."

On April 21, 1975, a Carmichael, California branch of the bank in the Sacramento area was robbed by several members of the Symbionese Liberation Army. SLA member Emily Harris accidentally fired her shotgun (as she later said in a plea deal) and killed Myrna Opsahl, a 42-year-old customer and mother of four.

Crocker National Bank was purchased by the British financial institution Midland Bank in 1981, but after a series of financial losses, it was sold to Wells Fargo Bank in 1986. Crocker's executive vice president and two-thirds of the top 70 executives lost their jobs because of the merger.

== In popular culture ==
Scott Adams worked at Crocker National Bank in San Francisco between 1979 and 1986, his first years in the business world. He drew on that and other experiences when creating the Dilbert comic strip.
