= Big Four (Central Pacific Railroad) =

Tycoons of the Central Pacific Railroad

Leland Stanford, Charles Crocker, Collis P. Huntington and Mark Hopkins in Men of California, 1900 to 1902

"The Big Four" was the name popularly given to the famous and influential businessmen, and railroad tycoons — also called robber barons — who funded the Central Pacific Railroad (C.P.R.R.), which formed the western portion through the Sierra Nevada and the Rocky Mountains of the First Transcontinental Railroad in the United States, built from the mid-continent at the Missouri River to the Pacific Ocean during the middle and late 1860s.

Composed of Leland Stanford (1824–1893), Collis Potter Huntington (1821–1900), Mark Hopkins Jr. (1813–1878), and Charles Crocker (1822–1888), the four themselves, however, personally preferred to be known as "The Associates."

They enriched themselves using tax money and land grants, while heavily influencing the state legislature from within the Republican Party (Stanford was governor of California when the first of the Pacific Railroad Acts was passed.), and through monopolizing tactics. Contemporary critics claimed they were the greatest swindlers in U.S. history.

== Membership ==
- Leland Stanford (1824–1893) – C.P.R.R. President, Stanford University founder.
- Collis Potter Huntington (1821–1900) – C.P.R.R. Vice President, for whom the city of Huntington, West Virginia was named. He is also the uncle of Henry E. Huntington (1850–1927), founder of the famous Huntington Library with its art galleries and gardens in San Marino, California.
- Mark Hopkins Jr. (1813–1878) – C.P.R.R. Treasurer
- Charles Crocker (1822–1888) – Construction Supervisor, President of Charles Crocker & Co., a C.P.R.R. subsidiary, later founder of the larger, more extensive Southern Pacific Railroad, another transcontinental link to the east, built later in 1883.

Collectively, the four and E. B. Crocker established the Sacramento Library Association for the state capital in Sacramento, California in 1857, which later established the present Sacramento Public Library.

David Hewes, an enterprising businessman, was called the "maker of San Francisco" for his work in clearing land for development. He was invited to be a part of the "Big Four" but declined due to the financial risks. Over his lifetime he gained and lost several fortunes.

In their time, the four men were sometimes referred to as nabobs or "nobs," a reference to their wealth and influence. When the four built mansions in the same neighborhood of San Francisco, the area quickly became known as Nob Hill, a name it carries today.

== In popular culture ==
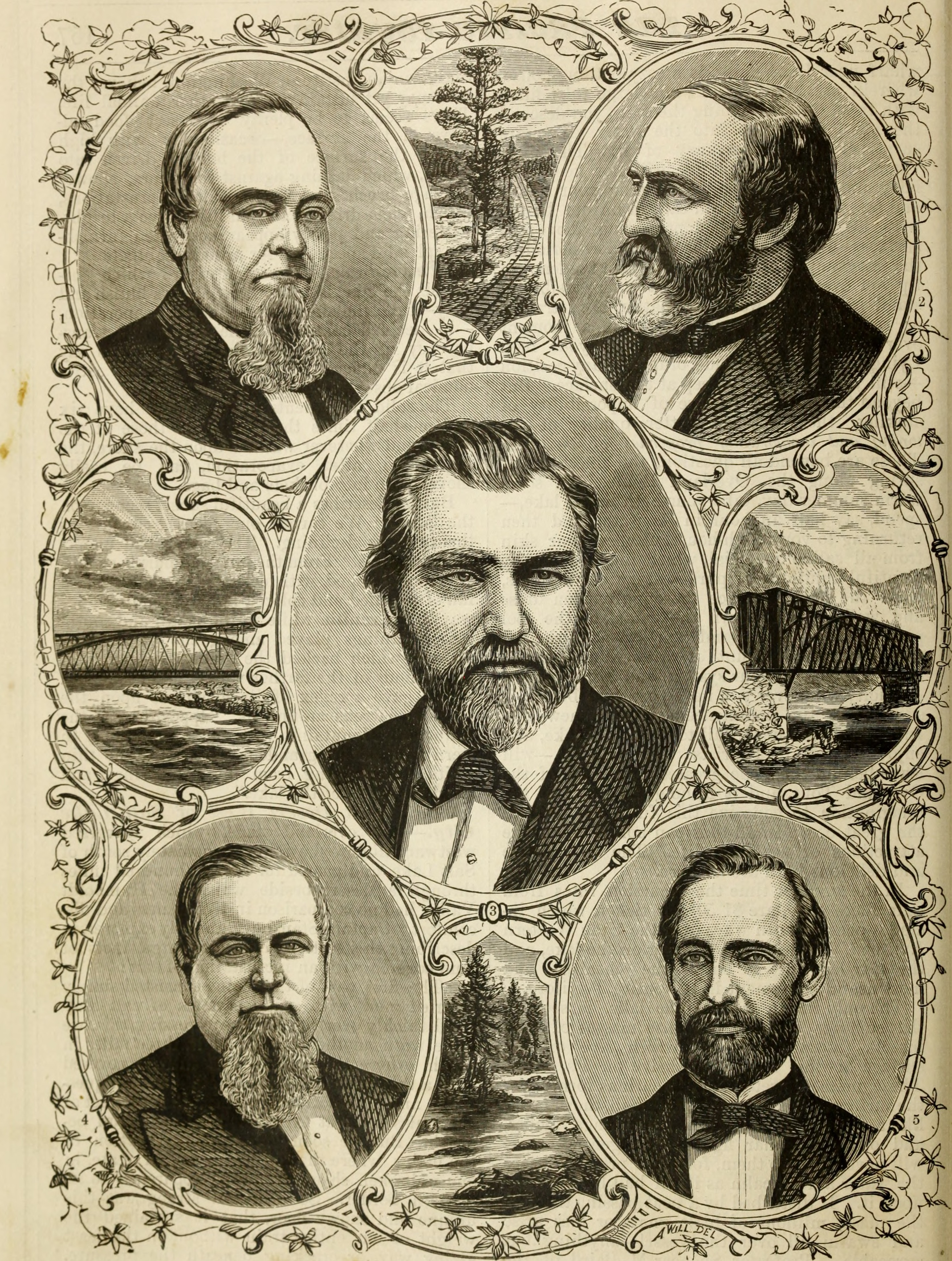
REPRESENTATIVE MEN OF THE CENTRAL PACIFIC RAILROAD: l.—E. B. Crocker. 2.—C. P. Huntington. 3.—Leland Stanford. 4.—Charles Crocker. 5.—Mark Hopkins. From 1878 "The Pacific tourist"

In Henry T. Williams' The Pacific tourist – Williams' illustrated trans-continental guide of travel, from the Atlantic to the Pacific Ocean published in 1878, the Big Four was replaced by the Five Associates or Representative Men of the Central Pacific Railroad, with Charles Crocker's older brother Judge Edwin B. Crocker (1818–1875), who served as the CPRR attorney from 1865 to 1869, added.

Ambrose Bierce lampooned the "Big Four" in his work "Black Beetles in Amber", a collection of satirical verses attacking various prominent Californians. In "The Birth of the Rail", "road agents" (bandits) Happy Hunty (Huntington), Cowboy Charley (Crocker), and Leland The Kid (Stanford), joined by minor devil Sootymug (Hopkins), give up robbing stage coaches for the much greater loot of railroad operation.
