= Edwin B. Crocker =

American judge (1818–1875)

Associate Justice of the California Supreme Court
- In office May 21, 1863 – January 2, 1864
- Appointed by: Governor Leland Stanford
- Preceded by: Stephen Johnson Field
- Succeeded by: Elections under 1862 amendment to California constitution and 1863 enabling law

Personal details
- Born: Edwin Bryant Crocker; April 26, 1818 Jamesville, New York, US
- Died: June 24, 1875 (aged 57) Sacramento, California, US
- Resting place: Sacramento Historic City Cemetery, Sacramento, California
- Spouses: Mary Norton (m. 1845; died 1847) Margaret Rhodes (m. 1852)
- Children: 7
- Occupation: Lawyer; California Supreme Court Justice
- Known for: Crocker Art Museum

Edwin Bryant Crocker (26 April 1818 – 24 June 1875) was a California Supreme Court Justice, legal counsel for the Central Pacific Railroad, and founder of the Crocker Art Museum in Sacramento, California.

== Biography ==
Crocker was born in Jamesville, New York, to Isaac and Elizabeth Crocker. He earned a degree in civil engineering at Rensselaer Institute in Troy, New York. He went on to read law in South Bend, Indiana. While there, he started a practice that earned him a reputation as an abolitionist. In June 1850, Crocker lost a civil case brought by a slave owner for helping four slaves escaping from Kentucky. In July 1850, Crocker attended the Liberty Party convention in Syracuse, New York, where he retold the story of helping the slaves. In June 1851, he spoke at the Christian Anti-Slavery State convention in Indianapolis, Indiana. In August 1852, he was named a delegate from Indiana to the Free Soil Party convention. In 1852, he and his second wife Margaret Ellen Rhodes Crocker moved to Sacramento, California.

When they arrived in Sacramento, Crocker resumed his legal career. He was also involved in politics. On March 8, 1856, he chaired the state's first meeting of the Republican Party. In 1863, Governor Leland Stanford appointed Crocker as an associate justice of the California Supreme Court, which position he held for seven months from May 21, 1863, to January 2, 1864. In 1863, elections were held for all seats on the Supreme Court due to an 1862 amendment to California constitution and 1863 enabling law, and Crocker chose to step down rather than seek election.

The next year, Crocker agreed to be legal counsel for the Central Pacific Railroad, a company run by the Big Four, which included Edwin's younger brother, Charles Crocker. As Central Pacific's attorney, Crocker was one of the Five Associates for about six years during the building of the First transcontinental railroad, culminating in the ceremony for the driving of the golden spike at Promontory, Utah, on May 10, 1869.

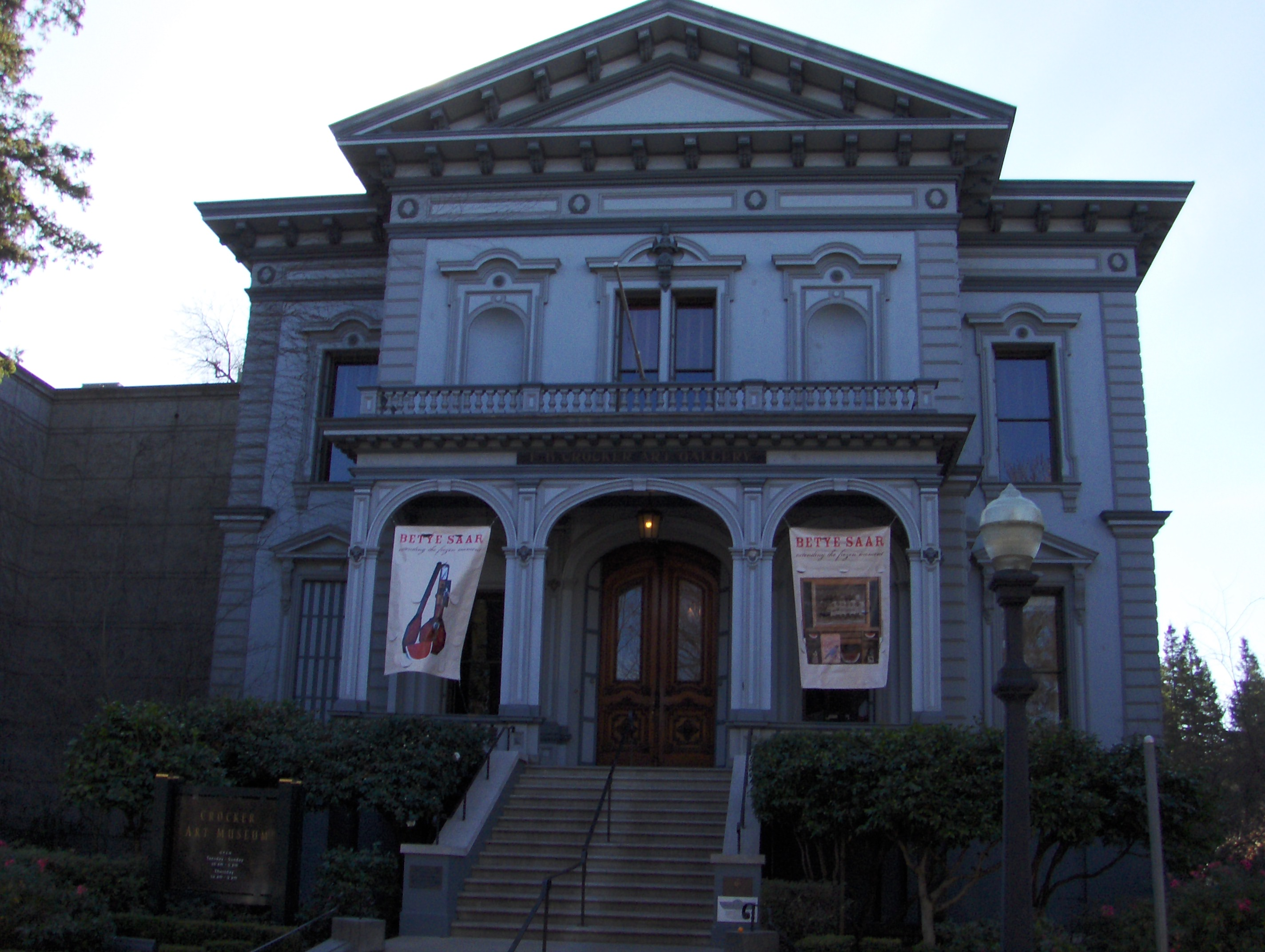
Crocker Art Museum in Sacramento, California

The stress of all of his work took a toll on Crocker. He suffered from a stroke in June 1869. He retired from his other pursuits and took up less stressful hobbies. With a net worth of a million dollars from railroad investments, Crocker and his family traveled throughout Europe and collected art. His family renovated their home to include an art gallery. Their home and the art that they had acquired would eventually become the Crocker Art Museum.

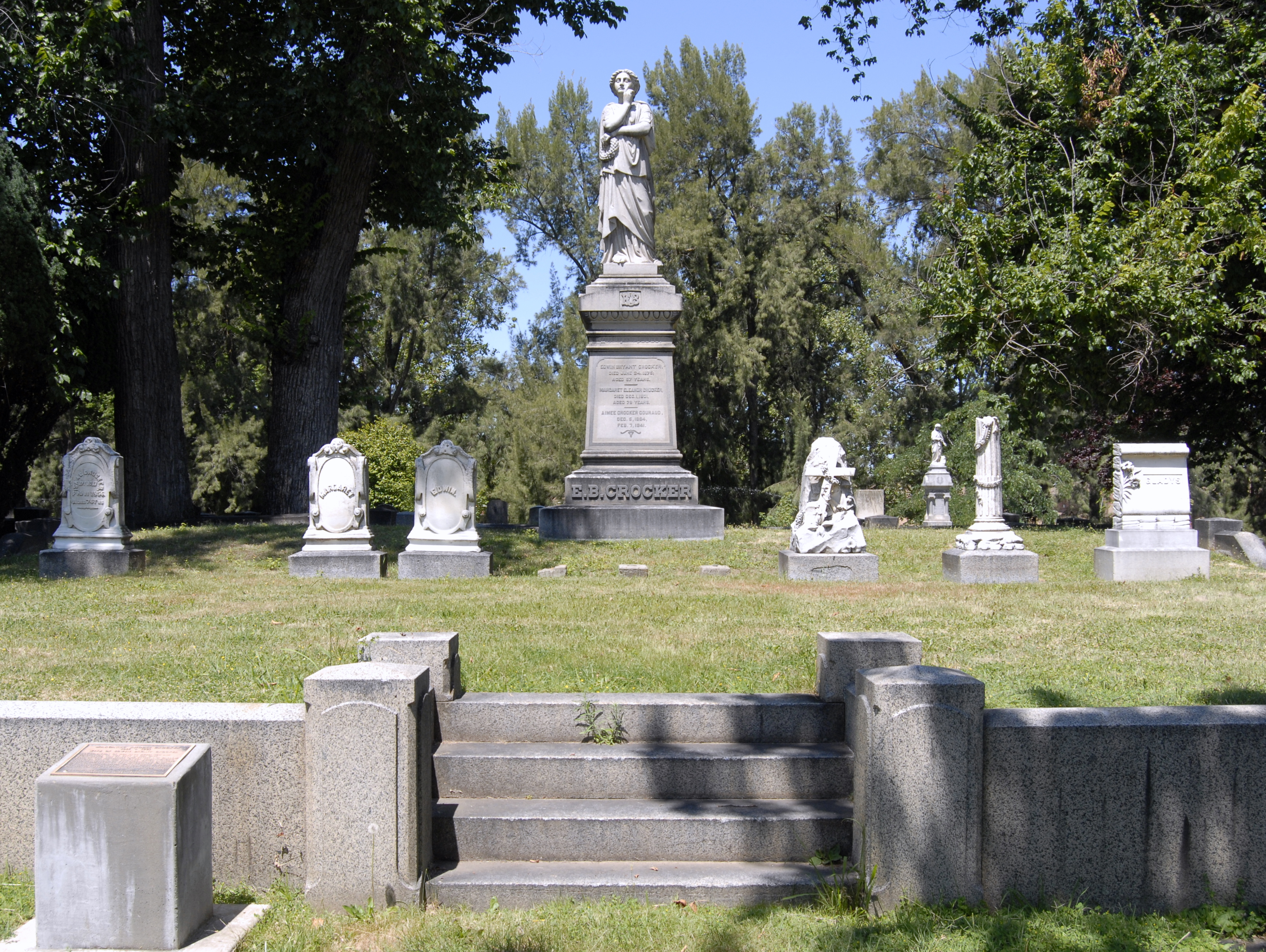
Crocker Gravesite

After his stroke, Crocker's health never fully recovered. On June 24, 1875, he died in Sacramento. He is interred in the Sacramento Historic City Cemetery in Sacramento, California.

== Personal life ==
On September 3, 1845, Crocker married Mary Norton in Mishawaka, Indiana. She died on April 12, 1847, in South Bend, Indiana. They had a daughter, also named Mary. On July 8, 1852, he remarried to Margaret Rhodes in New York in a ceremony performed by Henry Ward Beecher. They had four daughters: Aimée Crocker, Jennie Louise Crocker Fassett, Nellie Margaret and Kate Eugenie Gunn; and two sons: Edwin Clark, who died as a baby, and Elwood Bender, a relative whom they adopted.

== See also ==
- List of justices of the Supreme Court of California
- Warner Cope
- Edward Norton

Legal offices
Preceded by Stephen Johnson Field	Associate Justice of the California Supreme Court; 1863–1864	Succeeded by Elections under 1862 amendment to California constitution and 1863 enabling law
