= The Big Boodle =

1957 film by Richard Wilson

- 1957 Theatrical Poster
- Directed by: Richard Wilson
- Screenplay by: Jo Eisinger
- Based on: The Big Boodle; 1954 novel by Robert Sylvester
- Produced by: Lewis F. Blumberg
- Starring: Errol Flynn; Pedro Armendáriz; Rossana Rory; Gia Scala
- Cinematography: Lee Garmes
- Edited by: Charles L. Kimball
- Music by: Raúl Lavista
- Production company: Monteflor
- Distributed by: United Artists
- Release dates: January 25, 1957 (San Antonio, Texas); March 11, 1957 (New York City, New York)
- Running time: 84 minutes
- Country: United States
- Language: English
- Budget: a little over $600,000
- Box office: 371,394 admissions (France)

The Big Boodle is a 1957 American film noir crime film directed by Richard Wilson, and starring Errol Flynn, Pedro Armendáriz, Rossana Rory, and Gia Scala, filmed in Cuba.

The movie was also known as Night in Havana.

== Plot ==
Ned Sherwood, a blackjack dealer in a Havana casino, is given some counterfeit Cuban peso bills by a woman. He confronts the woman with the fact they are counterfeit, but she denies it and leaves.

That night, on his way home, two thugs attack, shoot and stab Ned but run off when the police are summoned. Colonel Guillermo Mastegui, Chief of the Secret Section of the Cuban National Police, interrogates Ned about the attack and accuses him of being involved in a plan to flood Cuba with worthless currency. Mastegui and a U.S. Treasury agent plan to have Ned followed in the hope that he will lead them to the head counterfeiter.

Ned loses his job and can't leave Cuba. He meets with a young woman, Anita Ferrer, who believes that he has the bills, as well as the engraving plates they were made from, and offers to buy them. Anita takes him to meet her father, who is president of the Bank of Cuba.

Señor Ferrer explains to Ned that Mastegui suspects that three million counterfeit pesos, manufactured in Chicago, are about to be laundered through the bank. Because this act would destroy confidence in the bank and in the government, Ferrer is anxious to discover who is behind the plot. Ned tells Ferrer that he knows nothing about the matter and is about to leave when Ferrer's other daughter, Josefina, returns home and Ned recognizes her as the woman who passed him the notes in the casino, but says nothing.

When "Fina" agrees to a meeting with Ned, she again denies any involvement in the counterfeiting, but offers to be seen with him in the hope of having the ringleaders show their hand.

After visiting several nightclubs, Fina admits that she took the counterfeit money from the pocket of Carlos Rubi, her sister's boyfriend.

Upon leaving a club, Ned and Fina are kidnapped by Miguel Collada, a trusted banking aide of her father, and his henchman Chuchu. Collada reveals that he is behind the scheme to substitute the counterfeit bills, which have now been chemically aged, for bundles of old, withdrawn bills that are to be burned under his supervision. He will then keep the genuine, old currency, but fears that his associate, Rubi, may have stolen the plates, which could connect him to the swindle.

To help Ned, with whom she is falling in love, Fina suggests to Collada that Rubi may have hidden the plates in El Morro Castle where Rubi, she and Anita used to play as children. Meanwhile, Anita meets with Rubi to try to extricate themselves from Collada's scheme in which they became involved in order to pay off substantial debts.

After Collada and Fina depart for El Morro, leaving Chuchu to guard Ned, Rubi comes to the house intending to kill Collada, but is shot and killed by Chuchu.

Ned escapes, alerts Mastegui, then goes with Anita to El Morro. When they catch up with Collada and Fina, Collada uses Fina as a shield during a gunfight. Anita tries to bargain with him, but is killed by Collada. Ned jumps on Collada and they fight on the castle's parapet until Collada falls, with the plates, into the sea and is eaten by sharks.

To protect Ferrer from the knowledge of Anita's wrongdoing, Mastegui declares that she has died a hero and considers the case closed. Ned and Fina walk off together.

== Cast ==
- Errol Flynn as Ned Sherwood
- Pedro Armendáriz as Col. Mastegui
- Rossana Rory as "Fina" Ferrer
- Gia Scala as Anita Ferrer
- Francisco Canero as Police doctor
- Luis Oquendo as Detective
- Charles Todd as U.S. Treasury Agent Griswold
- Enrique Cruz Alvarez as Police lt.
- Rogelio Hernández as Miguel Salcito
- Carlos Mas as Chuchu
- Jacques Aubuchon as Miguel Collada
- Guillermo Alvarez Guedes as Casino manager
- Aurora Pita as Linen shop girl
- Velia Martinez as Salcito's Secretary
- Sandro Giglio as Armando Ferrer
- Cesar Fernandez-Garriga as Errol Flynn's attacker and later knife victim
- Carlos Rivas as Carlos "Rubi" Rubin (uncredited)

== Production ==
=== Original Novel ===
The film was based on a 1954 novel by Robert Sylvester, which was reportedly based on a true incident.

The New York Times wrote that "Sylvester offers a dazzling yet believable new method of making counterfeit money, a credible private detective, an agreeable half-humorous style and much background detail on the history and atmosphere of Cuba – in all, just about enough to atone for a coincidental and episodic story and an irritating number of howlers in Spanish."

The Chicago Daily Tribune called it a "rugged slap bang adventure... at times engaging, at times superfluously vulgar."

=== Development ===
An earlier Sylvester novel Rough Sketch, had been filmed as We Were Strangers. The Cuban government, via its cultural representative in the US, Roberto Hernandez, approached Sylvester, offering facilities and possibly some financing for a movie version of The Big Boodle. Sylvester was enthusiastic, stating that "in addition to having all that colorful, authentic scenery and police clearance and cooperation – always a big help – the picture could be made inexpensively. It begins, briefly, here in New York as an American private eye heads to Cuba. From then on, the rest of the characters – and there are four main ones – are islanders."

Darcy Miller bought the film rights and announced plans to produce and direct. This fell through but a few months later it was announced film rights had been optioned by Lewis Blumberg, son of Nate Blumberg, chairman of Universal International. In February 1956 Blumberg signed a deal with United Artists. Originally he said he did not want to film in Cuba.

=== Casting ===
Errol Flynn signed to star in March 1956. He reportedly had a 25% interest in the film.

The following month, Richard Wilson agreed to direct; Wilson had first met Flynn when he and Orson Welles hired Flynn's yacht for The Lady from Shanghai.

Linda Christian discussed playing a female lead. Eventually, Rossana Rory took the part, with Gia Scala in support. Pedro Armendariz flew in from Italy to play the lead. Carlos Rivas, who had appeared in the film version of The King and I, also joined the cast. Blumberg said, "The possible added revenue far outweighs the additional salaries we may have had to face in rounding up this cast."

=== Shooting ===
Filming did eventually take place in Cuba, starting in late May 1956, mostly in Havana. The climax was shot at Morro Castle. It was one of the first American movies shot in Cuba, and used many of the cast and crew from The Sharkfighters. "We certainly couldn't complain about the Cuban cooperation," said Blumberg.

Post-production was done in Estudios Churubusco in Mexico City.

Flynn would return to Cuba to make Assault of the Cuban Rebel Girls and Cuban Story.

== Release ==
=== Critical reception ===
The Los Angeles Times called the film "a fair-to-middling screen drama ... the story gets pretty well muddled ... Director Richard Wilson manages to keep his mimes moving around briskly. As for Flynn – well, he's the same Errol, albeit a bit older."

The New York Times wrote that the film was "fairly taut during most of the route, if somewhat locquatious, director Richard Wilson has kept his principals moving at a brisk pace against an authentic background."

Filmink magazine wrote in 2019 "You wouldn’t believe the handsome, dashing Errol Flynn of the ‘30s and ‘40s had been reduced to being a croupier at a Havana casino – but you would believe the seedy Errol of the late ‘50s; his age and pain on his face tell the story of it all ... a man who’s done a lot of living, with plenty of regret."

Leslie Halliwell in Halliwell's Film Guide wrote of the film: "An undistinguished chase film with the star very tired and a long way from home".

== See also ==
- List of American films of 1957
