= Showdown (Flynn novel) =

Romantic adventure novel by Errol Flynn

- First edition
- Author: Errol Flynn
- Language: English
- Genre: Adventure novel
- Publisher: Invincible Press
- Publication date: 1946
- Publication place: Australia
- Media type: Print (Hardback & Paperback)

Showdown is a romantic adventure novel written by famous Tasmanian-born actor Errol Flynn (1909–1959). It was first published in 1946 by Invincible Press (Australia) and subsequently in the UK in 1952 and in paperback in 1961. Flynn draws on his experiences working in and around New Guinea when young to provide the background. Accounts of his sailing in New Guinea waters appear in his autobiographies, Beam Ends (1937) and My Wicked, Wicked Ways (1959).

The novel is dedicated to German-American artist John Decker, who painted Flynn's portrait, translated in the same year to Spanish as Un drama en los Mares del Sur (Renacimiento, 1946).

== Background ==
The novel was originally called One Man in His Time and then Charlie Bow Tie Proceeds.

While writing it he was also reported to be working on another book, a novel about the nephew of Montezuma fighting the Conquistadores, called Cuautenos.
