= Earl Conrad =

American historian (1906–1986)

Earl Conrad (17 December 1906 – 17 January 1986), birth name Cohen, was an American author who penned at least twenty works of biography, history, and criticism, including books in collaboration. At least one that he 'ghost' wrote was the autobiography of actor Errol Flynn, titled My Wicked, Wicked Ways.

Conrad was born to Eli and Minnie Cohen in Auburn, New York, into a Jewish family with nine siblings. He was "reared in the Judaic tradition" but chose to Anglicize his name when he began his career as a professional journalist. He wished to be a writer from a young age, and his early experience included a stint at the Auburn Advertiser-Journal. He worked as a journalist for the newspaper PM in New York City, and other papers. As the Harlem Bureau Chief for The Chicago Defender, an African American title, he investigated lynchings in the south. This work brought him into contact with Haywood Patterson. In 1950, Conrad co-wrote Patterson's memoir, Scottsboro Boy, about his experience as one of the group of nine men accused of rape in Alabama in 1931.

Conrad married Anna Alyse Abrams in 1938; the couple had one son, Michael Earl Conrad. The Conrads lived in San Francisco at least during the 1967-1972 period in an apartment near downtown, not far from Union Square. In the early 1980s, they lived in Coronado, California. Some of his papers are in the local history collection of the Cayuga Community College in Auburn. Other papers are in the collection of the University of Oregon. He died on January 17, 1986, of complications from lymphoma.

His interests as a writer included biographies of show business personalities, such as his memoir of Errol Flynn and his biography of Dorothy Dandridge; and issues related to African Americans, such as his biographies of Harriet Tubman. He wrote a fantasy novel about an African American nation being carved out of the American South, a country in the shape of Africa.

== Works ==
Non-Fiction

- Harriet Tubman: Negro Soldier and Abolitionist (International Publishers, 1942)
- Harriet Tubman (The Associated Publishers, 1943)
- Jim Crow America (Duell, Sloan, and Pearce, 1947)
- Scottsboro Boy (with Haywood Patterson) (Doubleday and Company, 1950)
- The Public School Scandal (The John Day Company, 1951)
- Horse Trader: The Story of a Real David Harum (Thomas Y. Crowell, 1953)
- My Wicked, Wicked Ways (with Errol Flynn) (G.P. Putnam, 1959)
- Billy Rose: Manhattan Primitive (World Publishing Company, 1968)
- The Invention of the Negro (Paul S. Eriksson Inc, 1969)
- Everything and Nothing: The Dorothy Dandridge Tragedy (with Dorothy Dandridge) (Abelard-Schuman, 1970)
- Errol Flynn: A Memoir (Dood, Mead, and Company, 1978)

Novels

- Rock Bottom: A Woman's Proud, Desperate Journey from Mississippi to Harlem (Doubleday and Company, 1952)
- Gulf Stream North (Second Chance Press, 1954)
- Mr. Seward for the Defense (Rinehart and Company, 1956)
- The Governor and His Lady: The Story of William Henry Seward and His Wife Frances (G.P. Putnam's Sons, 1960)
- Crane Eden (Bernard Geis Associates, 1962)
- The Premier (Doubleday and Company, 1963)
- Typoo (Paul S. Eriksson Inc, 1969)
- Club (West-Lewis Publishing Company, 1974)

Short Fiction

- The Da Vinci Machine: Tales of the Population Explosion (Fleet Press, 1968)

Poetry

- Battle New York: Mural of the Metropolis (West-Lewis Publishing Company, 1968)
- The Tumblin World of Tom MacWhorty (Coronado, 1982)
