= Kaikōura Memorial Hall =

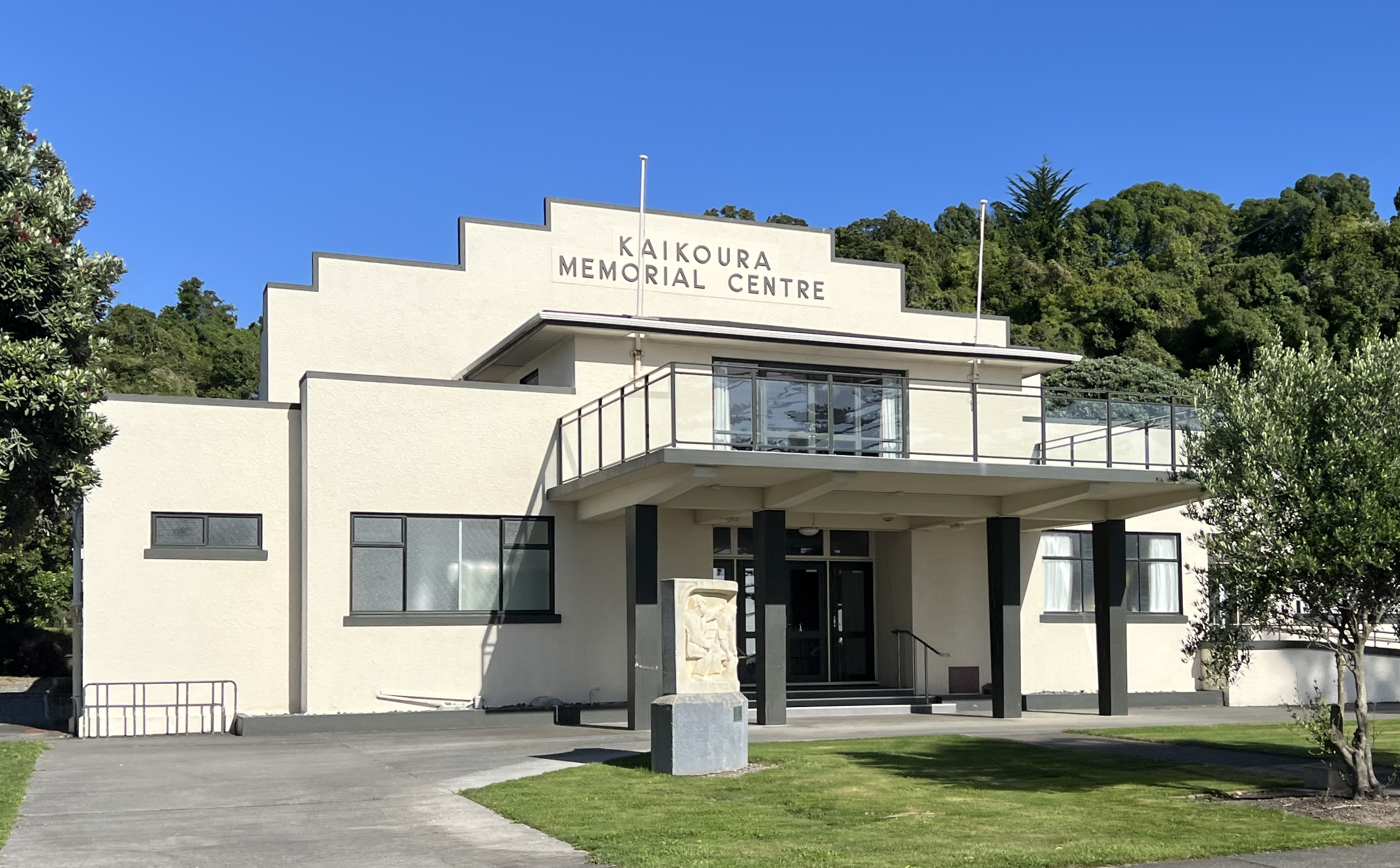
- The hall in 2026
- Interactive map of the Kaikōura Memorial Hall area
- Alternative names: Kaikōura Memorial Centre

General information
- Location: 134 Beach Road, Kaikōura, New Zealand
- Coordinates: 42.4052423°S 173.6838832°E

The Kaikōura Memorial Hall is situated in Kaikōura, on the east coast of New Zealand. It was constructed in 1955 as a memorial to fallen servicemen from World War I and World War II. The hall was damaged in the 2016 Kaikōura earthquake and was reopened in 2019 after significant upgrades and repairs, funded in part by a Lotteries Commission grant.

== History ==
The building of a war memorial for Kaikōura was first proposed in 1945, but no action was taken until May 1947, when £1000 was allocated by the Kaikōura County Council to establish the project. It was decided to build a hall both to honour fallen servicemen and to serve as a facility for community events. The decision was approved by the Marlborough Returned Services Association on condition that some rooms in the hall were allocated to the exclusive use of the association. Donations to the fund were matched first by the council and then by government, and by 1954 nearly £27,000 had been raised. A queen carnival raised more than £5000, and other donations were made by the Kaikōura Brass Band and the Plunket Society. The amount raised equated to around ten pounds for every person in the district.

In 1954 a tender for £2015 was accepted for a reinforced concrete building of around 10,000 square feet, with a main hall including a stage, a supper room, library and Plunket rooms. A forecourt was also included in the plans, to be used for activities such as basketball and rollerskating. The site chosen was adjacent to the council offices and opposite a memorial garden to World War I servicemen, and also included some land from the Māori Cemetery reserve.

== Opening ==
The hall was opened on 24 June 1955 by John McAlpine, who was Minister of Railways. The MP for the Southern Māori electorate, Eruera Tirikātene, also gave a speech. The final cost of the hall was reported to be £32,000. When opened, the hall was painted a "deep coral" outside and in the main hall, with pale blue, buff and green ceiling tonings. The honour boards inside record the names of local servicemen killed in both World War I and World War II. The opening was marked by an afternoon tea for the families of returned servicemen, a dinner, and a ball which nearly 800 people attended.

== Earthquake and renovations ==
The hall was damaged by the 2016 Kaikōura earthquake, requiring about $1.5 million of repairs. The Kaikōura District Council subsequently received a $750,000 Lotteries Environment and Heritage grant for upgrades and repairs, including accessibility improvements for wheelchair users, and replacement wall and ceiling linings to improve acoustics and allow for indoor sport uses. The hall also received a new glass balustrade. The hall was closed from the earthquake until its reopening in September 2019, although the official reopening ceremony was held in November.

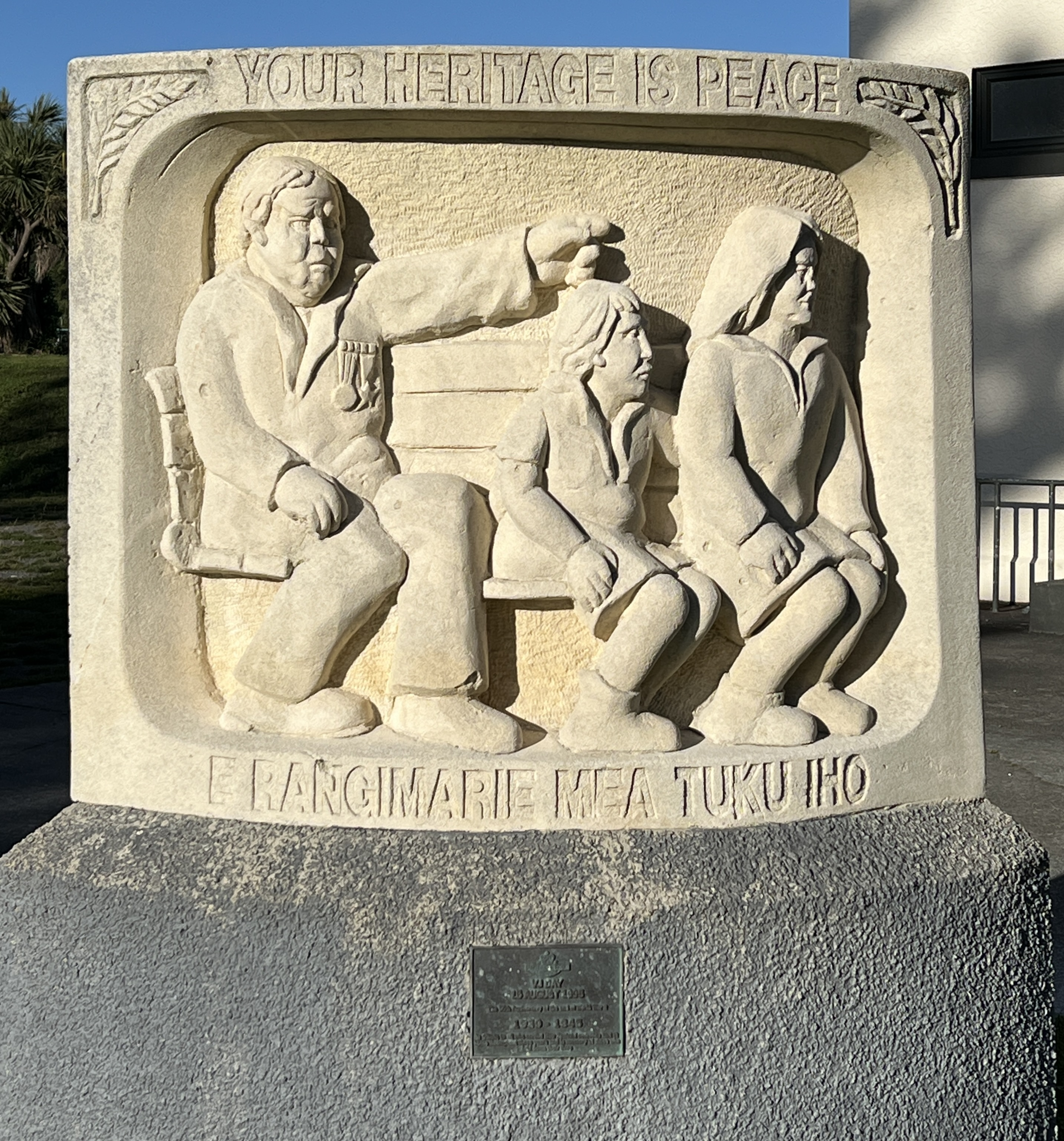
Sculpture commemorating VJ Day

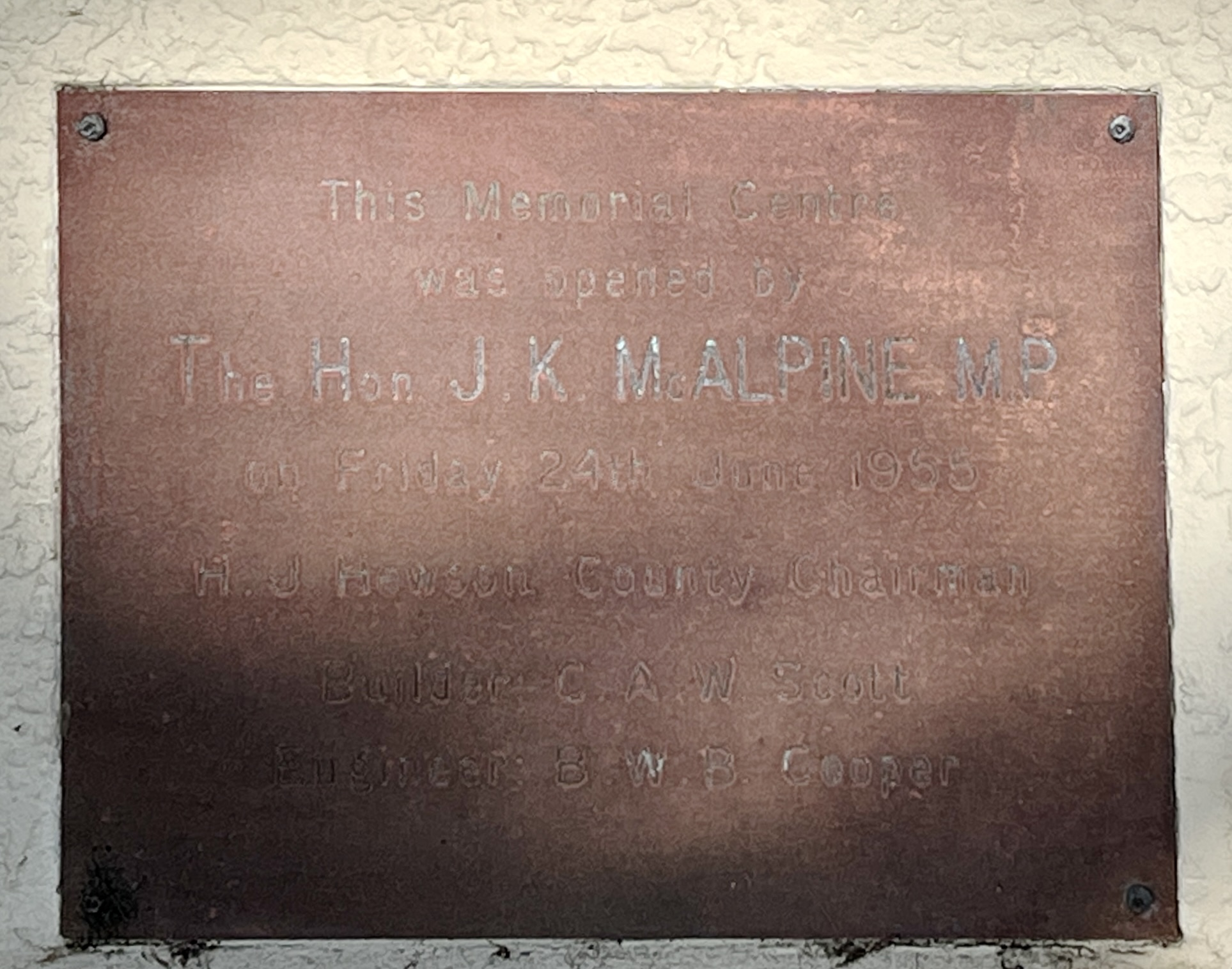
Plaque recording the opening of the centre in 1955

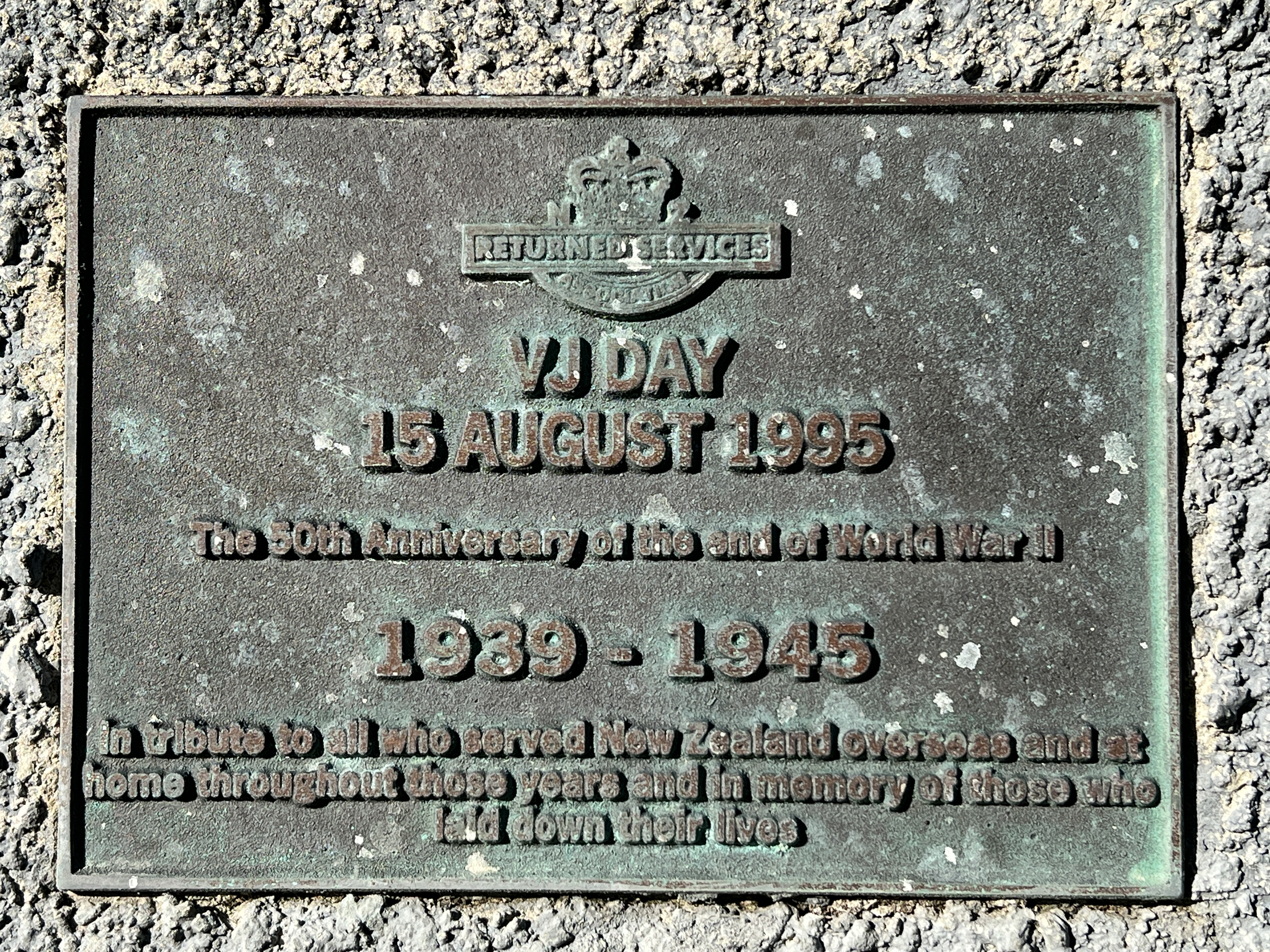
Plaque commemorating the 50th anniversary of VJ Day, in 1995
