= In Like Flynn (film) =

2018 biographical film

- Australian theatrical release poster
- Directed by: Russell Mulcahy
- Written by: Steve M. Albert; Corey Large; Marc Furmie
- Story by: Steve M. Albert
- Based on: Beam Ends by Errol Flynn
- Produced by: Corey Large; James M. Vernon
- Starring: Thomas Cocquerel; Corey Large; William Moseley; Clive Standen; Isabel Lucas; Nathalie Kelley; Grace Huang; Costas Mandylor; Vanessa Moltzen; Lochlyn Munro; Dan Fogler; Nathan Jones
- Cinematography: Peter Holland
- Edited by: Rodrigo Balart
- Music by: David Hirschfelder
- Production companies: Blue Fox Entertainment; ThreeOEight
- Distributed by: Umbrella Entertainment
- Release date: 11 October 2018 (Australia)
- Running time: 106 minutes
- Country: Australia
- Language: English
- Budget: $12 million USD

In Like Flynn is a 2018 biographical film about the exploits of Australian actor Errol Flynn. It was directed by Russell Mulcahy. The film captures aspects of Flynn's life prior to his achieving fame in the United States between the 1930s and the 1950s. The title of the film is a play on words of Errol Flynn's name and the slang phrase "In like Flynn".

== Plot ==
After retrieving a map from a dead gold prospector, Errol Flynn believes it will lead him to gold in Papua New Guinea, and convinces three men to accompany him on a voyage up the east coast of Australia. They leave Sydney on the yacht Sirocco, which Flynn had stolen from Chinese opium smugglers. During their journey, Flynn and his crew encounter a number of challenges, including the Chinese crew attempting to intercept them, desperate to reclaim the yacht and the opium they have hidden on board.

== Cast ==
- Thomas Cocquerel as Errol Flynn
- Corey Large as Rex
- William Moseley as Dook Adams
- Clive Standen as Charlie
- Callan Mulvey as Johnson
- David Wenham as Christian Travers
- David Hennessey as Rudolph
- Isabel Lucas as Rose
- Nathalie Kelley as Zaca
- Grace Huang as Achun
- Costas Mandylor as Vassilis
- Vanessa Moltzen as Nurse
- Lochlyn Munro as Ronald
- Dan Fogler as Joel Schwartz
- Nathan Jones as The Mountain
- Andy McPhee as Bar Keep
- Melanie Zanetti as Frank's Girl
- Ashlee Lollback as Olivia de Havilland
- Jon Quested as Bar Patron
- Alexandra MacDonald as Flapper
- Raoul Craemer as Michael Curtiz

== Production ==
=== Writing ===
Flynn's grandson Luke Flynn, a surfer, model and composer, wrote and optioned the script as early as 2005. He controlled the rights to the source material and was initially set to play the titular role.

=== Casting ===
William Moseley joined the cast in November 2016, playing the character Dook Adams. In June 2017, Isabel Lucas joined the cast, playing the role of Rose. In July 2017, Corey Large and Thomas Cocquerel joined the cast.

=== Filming ===
Filming for In Like Flynn began on the Gold Coast in Queensland in May 2017. Additional filming took place in Mount Tamborine, Queensland.

As an Australian production, workdays were 10 hours long rather than the U.S.-standard 12 hours. One of the producers expressed concern that the difference would negatively impact the productivity of the Hollywood crew, but cinematographer Peter Holland convinced him otherwise.

Mulcahy's desire was to "bring Flynn’s unapologetic and uninhibited desire to experience a full adventurous and spectacular life to the screen. All while revealing his deeply rooted belief in himself and an ability to survive on charisma and bravado."

== Release ==
The film was released to Australian cinemas on 11 October 2018. It was later released worldwide on 25 January 2019.

== Reception ==
On Rotten Tomatoes the film has an approval rating of 48% based on reviews from 21 critics.

== See also ==
- Cinema of Australia
