= My Wicked, Wicked Ways =

Book by Errol Flynn

- First edition
- Author: Errol Flynn; Earl Conrad
- Original title: My Wicked, Wicked Ways
- Language: English
- Genre: Autobiography
- Publisher: G. P. Putnam's Sons
- Publication date: December 1959
- Media type: Print
- Pages: 438 (US)
- ISBN: 978-1-84513-049-7

My Wicked, Wicked Ways is an autobiography written by Australian-born American actor Errol Flynn with the aid of ghostwriter Earl Conrad. It was released posthumously in 1959 and became immensely popular for its cynical tone and candid depiction of the world of filmmaking in Hollywood. My Wicked, Wicked Ways has sold over one million copies. The book has never been out of print.

== Writing process ==
The original publisher, Putnam, paid an advance of $9,000 to Flynn for the rights of his autobiography. Ghostwriter Earl Conrad was sent to Flynn's home in Jamaica to collaborate with the actor throughout the writing period. According to Beverly Aadland, Flynn's teenage girlfriend, Conrad was usually drunk and spent most of his time chasing Jamaican women. Aadland also claims that she and Flynn had difficulty removing him: "He was basically a doorstop with paid vacation". Jeffrey Meyers' introduction in the Aurum edition of My Wicked, Wicked Ways claims that Flynn dictated the book to Conrad from August to October 1958, and that he was a "literary stand in". Conrad would eventually publish his own book, Errol Flynn: A Memoir, in 1979, depicting Flynn's final year, their literary collaboration, and hearing the news of the actor's early death. My Wicked, Wicked Ways depicts major figures from the Classic Hollywood period including Jack L. Warner, John Barrymore, Bruce Cabot, Flynn's first wife Lili Damita and director Michael Curtiz. Flynn also writes of falling in love with co-star Olivia de Havilland.

== Praise ==
"This is a major autobiography in the tradition of Cellini, Casanova, and Frank Harris." – The Guardian

"Flynn set the record straight and is brutally honest in his posthumously published self-portrait. This restored version of the 1959 original contains numerous passages deleted from earlier editions for fear of lawsuits—he was equally brutal in his portrayal of many Hollywood big shots—plus eight pages of photos and a new introduction by biographer Jeffrey Meyers." – Library Journal

"A document on Hollywood life far beyond its fan magazine fascination… . [Flynn] delivers footnotes to film history that are hard to come by." – San Francisco Chronicle

"The Tasmanian-actor portrays himself not as a debonair swashbuckler but as a chronically unhappy soul whose luck, talent and high spirits vaulted him to fame, even as he remained unfulfilled until the end." – Indiana Gazette

"...the confessions of a rake, unsparing of himself or anyone else..." – Newsweek

"Incredibly absorbing… . Just as in life, Flynn spares himself nothing—and from his book emerges the same roguish charm that endeared his celluloid incarnation to millions." – Saturday Review

"Flynn writes cleverly, as he talked. He has left us a good book." – The New York Times

== TV movie ==
A TV movie adaptation called My Wicked, Wicked Ways: The Legend of Errol Flynn directed by Don Taylor and starring Duncan Regehr as Flynn was released in 1985.

== Sources ==
- Earl, Conrad (1979). Errol Flynn: A Memoir. Robert Hale Ltd. ISBN 0-396-07502-9.
