= Cuban Story =

- Directed by: Victor Pahlen
- Written by: Victor Pahlen
- Starring: Errol Flynn
- Release date: 1959
- Running time: 60 minutes
- Country: United States
- Language: English

Cuban Story: The Truth about Fidel Castro Revolution is a 1959 film documentary narrated by Errol Flynn, and the last known performance work of his career.

It was one of two films Flynn made about the Cuban Revolution during the early period when Castro was publicly denying his communist allegiance, the other being the drama-documentary Cuban Rebel Girls (1959).

In a 2009 retrospective, Patrick Humphries, presenter for the BBC production "Robin Hood and the Cuban Revolutionaries", called it "one of the key accounts of Castro's revolution" and described it as a "far more substantial piece" than Cuban Rebel Girls. Filmink called the film "surprisingly engrossing" although "technically the quality is poor."
