= The Modern Adventures of Casanova =

- Country of origin: United States
- Language(s): English
- Syndicates: Mutual Broadcasting System in cooperation with M-G-M Radio Attractions
- Starring: Errol Flynn
- Created by: Errol Flynn
- Written by: Peter Dixon; Harold Swanton
- Directed by: William Robson
- Produced by: William Robson
- Original release: 3 January 1952 – 8 January 1953
- No. of series: 2
- No. of episodes: 39

The Modern Adventures of Casanova was a 1952 Mutual radio show starring Errol Flynn. Flynn played a modern-day descendant of Casanova who actually works for Interpol. The program was written, produced, and directed by William N. Robson. Walter Schumann provided the music.

== Selected episodes ==
- Episode 1 – premiere – 3 January 1952 – set in Venice Italy
- Episode 2 – "The Phony Count" – 10 January 1952 – Casanova saves a woman from a phony count
- Episode 3 – "Family Vendetta" – 17 January 1952 – Casanova visits Venice and deals with the Marchetties, enemies of the Casanovas
- Episode 4–24 January 1952 – while skiing in Switzerland, Casanova helps play cupid for a younger couple
- Episode 5–31 January 1952
- Episode 6–7 February 1952
- Episode 7–14 February 1952 – Casanova helps on Valentine's Day
- Episode 8–21 February 1952
- Episode 9–28 February 1952
- Episode 10–6 March 1952
- Episode 11–13 March 1952
- Episode 12–20 March 1952
- Episode 13–27 March 1952 – Casanova tracks down a dope smuggling ring in Paris
- Episode 14 – "The Bride of the Rain God" – 3 April 1952 – Casanova investigates a cursed relic from the Mayan civilisation responsible for killing people
- Episode 15–10 April 1952 – Casanova investigates a pair of con artists on the French riviera
- Episode 16–17 April 1952 – Casanova smashes a gold smuggling syndicate
- Episode 17 – "The Black Dowry Pearls" – 24 April 1952 – Casanova goes to Venice to retrieve some pearls from Phillip II
- Episode 18–1 May 1952
- Episode 19–8 May 1952
- Episode 20–15 May 1952 – Casanova goes to Egypt to stop a drug smuggling ring
- Episode 21 – "The Missing Arm of Venus de Milo" – 22 May 1952 – Christopher Casanova is sent to Jamaica to recover the missing arm of the Venus de Milo.
- Episode 22–29 May 1952
- Episode 23–5 June 1952
- Episode 24–12 June 1952
- Episode 25–19 June 1952
- Episode 26–26 June 1952 – Casanova investigates the murder of a beauty in Paris
- Episode 27 – first of season two – 2 October 1952
- Episode 28 – "The Sumatra Adventure" – 9 October 1952
- Episode 29–16 October 1952
- Episode 30–23 October 1952
- Episode 31 – "The Gold Brick Swindle" – 30 October 1952 – Casanova goes to Karachi
- Episode 32–6 November 1952
- Episode 33–13 November 1952
- Episode 34–20 November 1952
- Episode 35 – "The Star of Thessaly" – 27 November 1952 – Casanova guards an old Greek millionaire who is visiting Paris with a diamond
- Episode 36–4 December 1952
- Episode 37–11 December 1952
- Episode 38
- Episode 39

== Reception ==
The critic from the Chicago Daily Tribune said that "this swashbuckling mademoiselle chaser reads a script loaded with improbable situations, double entendres and what I suppose is Riviera playboy talk."
