= In like Flynn =

Slang phrase

"In like Flynn" is a slang phrase meaning "having quickly or easily achieved a goal or gained access as desired."

== Origins ==
=== Edward J. Flynn ===
Etymologist Eric Partridge presents evidence that it refers to Edward J. Flynn (most prominent c. 1922 - 1943), a New York City political boss who became a campaign manager for the Democratic party during Franklin Delano Roosevelt's presidency. Boss Flynn's "Democratic Party machine exercised absolute political control over the Bronx.... The candidates he backed were almost automatically 'in'."

=== Other possible popularizations (1930-1942) ===
In Australia, the 1932 Ion Idriess biographical novel Flynn of the Inland about John Flynn & the Royal Flying Doctor Service, may add to the list of possible associations with the expression.

Barry Popik of the American Dialect Society and Nattalie Grebenshikoff of the Gold Coast Literary Society found an example from 1940, as well as this from the sports section of the San Francisco Examiner of 8 February 1942: “Answer these questions correctly and your name is Flynn, meaning you’re in, provided you have two left feet and the written consent of your parents”. To judge from a newspaper reference he turned up from early 1943, the phrase could by then also be shortened to I'm Flynn, meaning “I’m in”.

=== Errol Flynn ===
In November 1942, the rhyming phrase became associated with actor Errol Flynn, who was accused of statutory rape by minors Betty Hansen and Peggy Satterlee. Flynn had a reputation for womanizing, consumption of alcohol, and brawling. A group was organized to support Flynn, named the American Boys' Club for the Defense of Errol Flynn (ABCDEF); its members included William F. Buckley Jr. The trial took place in January and February 1943, and Flynn was acquitted of the charges. According to etymologist Michael Quinion, "the phrase is said to have been coined following his acquittal in February 1943." Many early sources, attesting the phrase, say it emerged as war slang during World War II.

The phrase has been widely used in Australia to refer to quick and easy sexual conquest. This usage is usually attributed to Errol Flynn's movie star good looks and irresistibly charming manner without any undertones of rape or predatory criminal behaviour.

=== In culture ===
American journalist MacKinlay Kantor used the phrase in his 1945 book Glory For Me. The same year, the phrase was copyrighted as the name of a musical composition. The phrase was used in a Billboard magazine article in 1947, stating, "...in less time than it takes to say 'Sidney Piermont,' I am in like Flynn." Piermont was a promoter who suggested that Lucille Ball and Desi Arnaz perform onstage together, which would later inspire the show I Love Lucy.

Quinion also notes that the title of the 1967 film In Like Flint is a play on the term, and that has led to a malapropism where some speakers believe that is the original phrase.
