= Queen carnival =

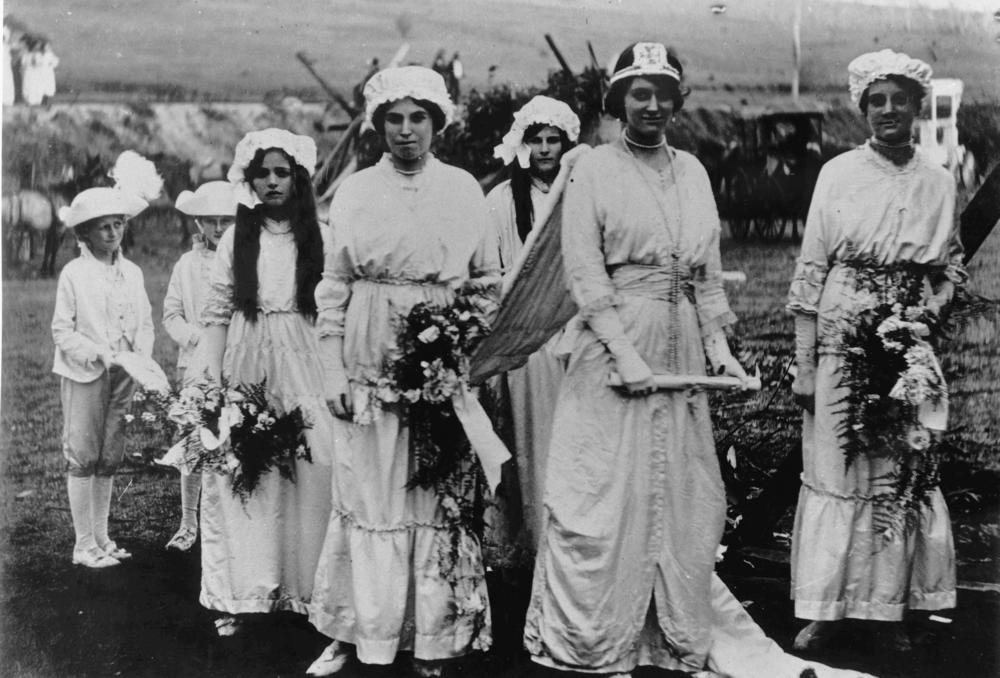
Queen carnival at Atherton in 1919

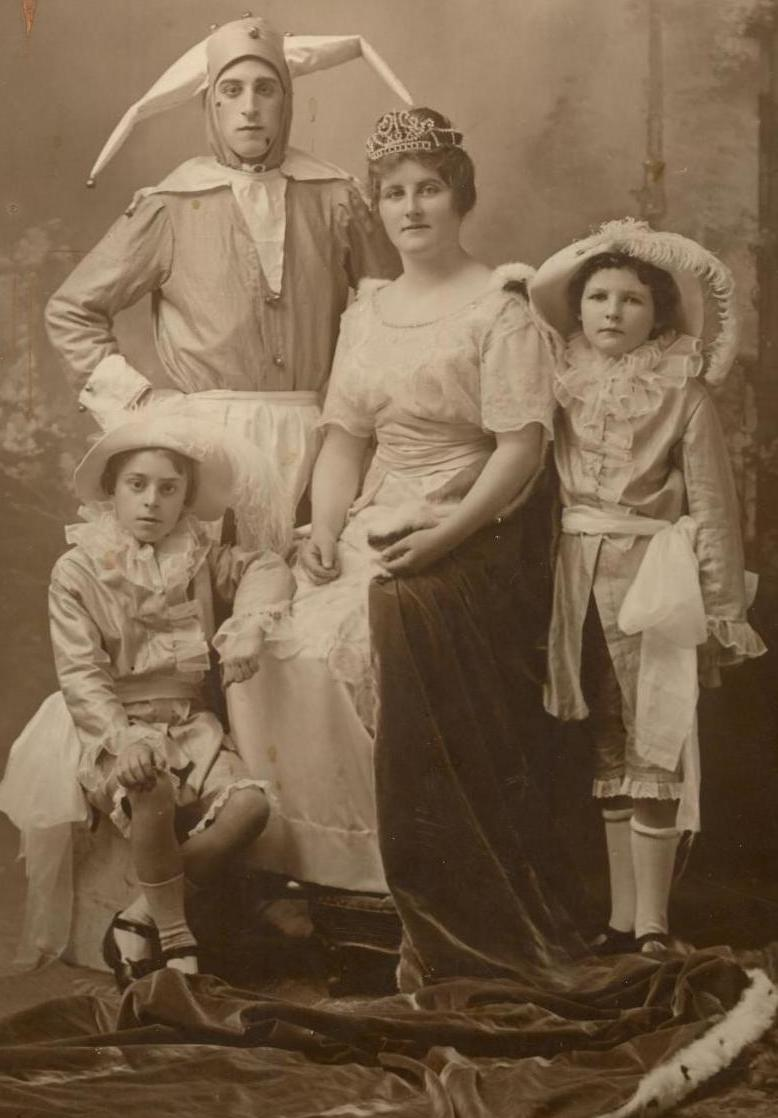
Participants in a queen carnival in Hobart, Tasmania, in 1918, including Enid Lyons as "Queen of the Public Service" and a young Errol Flynn (right) as one of her page boys.

A queen carnival was a type of fundraising event that was popular in New Zealand and Australia during the early 20th century. They were particularly common during World War I and in the years after, when they were used to raise funds for returned soldiers. The first such carnival is believed to have been held in Napier, New Zealand, in 1913. The carnivals were not always annual events, and were held in various locations throughout a year.

== 1913 Napier Mardi Gras ==
Possibly the first time the popular election of the Queen of the Carnival was used as fundraiser was at the 1913 Napier mardi gras. One report said the contest was for a "Queen of Beauty" and the public would choose from photographs of the entrants with names remaining secret. There were 13 candidates. A vote cost two pence and with 62580 votes cast, over £500 was raised.

As the Queen would reign over the revels, wit, personality, majesty and a talent for theatre would be of advantage and the election of Mrs J. A. Rosewarne proved a success, although one newspaper did think the Queen of Carnival should be unmarried. Mrs Rosewarne was also called Napier's Queen of Song and was principal soprano at a pre-festival performance of the Messiah. The mardi gras was a triumphant success and the Queen, as part of the theatre of the event, bestowed honours on a number of the Napier burghers and made the organiser of the carnival, John Hopkins, a KCMG or Knight Commander Mardi Gras.

One newspaper devoted a page to pictures of the carnival and a film was made for screening at picture theatres.

Inaugurated by the Napier Thirty Thousand Club to raise money for town beautification, the mardi gras became an annual event which John Hopkins continued to organise. The war changed priorities, and in 1914 the proceeds went to the Belgian Relief Fund and in 1915 to the Wounded Soldiers Fund. .

The carnival became a model for other queen carnivals in New Zealand and John Hopkins was approached to help with the upcoming Whanganui carnival

== William Lints ==
William Lints (aka William Lintz) was born in Aberdeen, Scotland on 14 December 1881. His parents were William and Helen Lints. The family moved first to Australia in 1882 where Lints was educated. In July 1893 the family emigrated to New Zealand and settled in Whanganui. Lints became a hairdresser and married Mabel Daisy Armstrong, the daughter of William and Sarah Armstrong, in 1902. In 1903 he became manager of the Central Hairdressing Saloon in New Plymouth. Lints established his own business, the Antiseptic Hairdressing Saloon, in Devon Street East, New Plymouth. He was also a sportsman; instructing and doing gymnastics; playing hockey and water polo; swimming; and skating. As early as 1903, in Whanganui, he became involved in organising activities for the civic organisations he belonged to.

After creating the Queen Carnival concept, which he ran along with a revue called "Fete of nations" in 1914, Lints went on to direct large patriotic musical extravaganzas from 1916 to at least 1941. These included the "Battle of Bullion Hill" in 1916, the "Silver Bullet Cannoncade" in 1917, the revue called variously "Reveille", "Our Reveille", and "Reveille 1924" which ran from 1917 to the 1930s, and a 1941 revue called "Britannia". These revues were performed throughout New Zealand using Lints' own company supplemented by local performers from a variety of disciplines including ballet, opera, bands, and theatre.

Lints died in Whanganui at 91 years of age on 9 September 1973. His wife died in 1946 aged 62.

== Origin and purpose ==
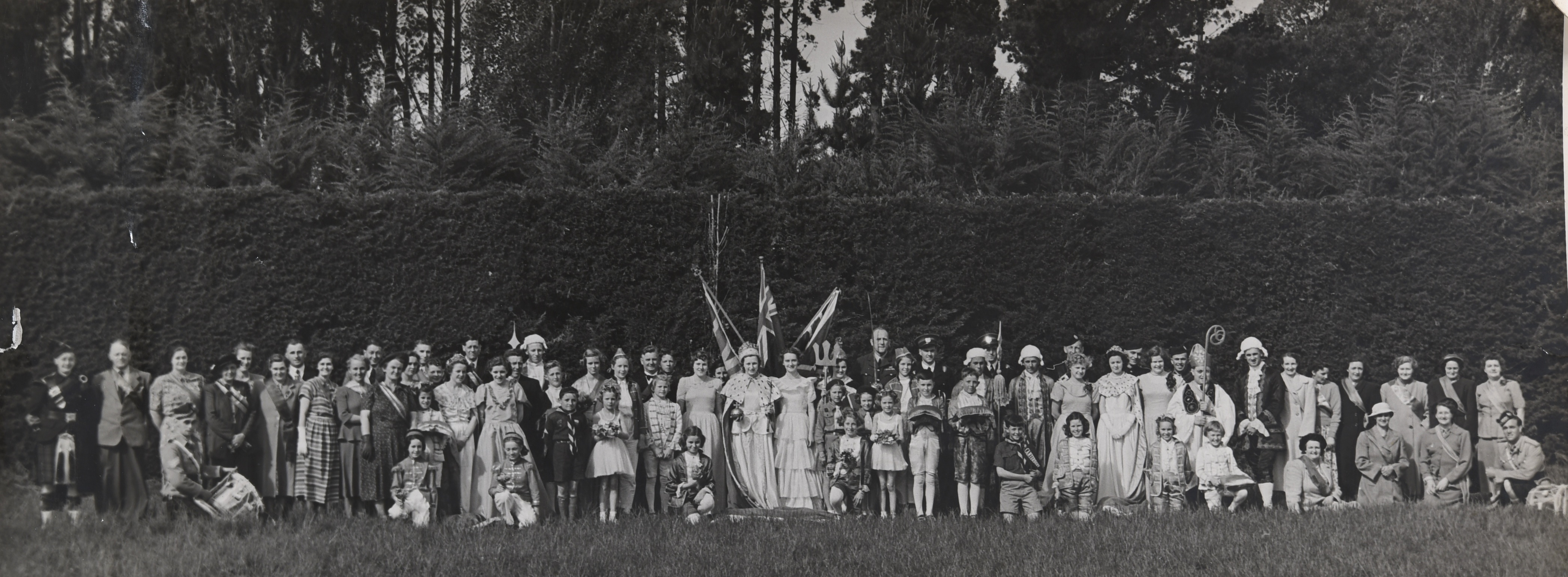
1951 Burwood School Queen Carnival

Initially the Queen Carnivals were organised by William Lints of New Plymouth to raise funds for a variety of purposes, and particularly during World War I funds for wounded soldiers returning home. During the inter-war period Queen Carnivals were held to raise funds for worthy community causes, such as sports facilities or community buildings and services. The carnivals included elements of talent shows, fancy dress, sport and the sale of local produce, with a focus on electing a queen of the carnival. Votes were cast for each candidate and the winner was pronounced queen in a coronation ceremony at the end of the carnival.

Newspaper reports in 1914 indicated that they had been held in Whanganui and New Plymouth, with Feilding and Tauranga also considering holding them. After the Auckland carnival criticism was laid at Lints over the cost of the event and the lack of money going to the event's beneficiaries. The lack of funds raised may have been Lints' initial inexperience as later events were reported as raising thousands of pounds. Certainly Lints received payment for his efforts.

In February 1915 Lints was reported as going to Bathurst and Albury in Australia to organise similar events, but was still in Nelson in March and reported as organising another in Gisborne in April. The Australian event occurred later that year. Queen Carnivals were held in various towns and cities around the country.

Lints advertised another carnival in Whanganui in October 1915 for commencement in December 1915. He followed this with a similar event in Nelson in 1916. The focus of these events had now become fund raising for returned soldiers.

It appears that even as early as 1915, individual towns and organisations were putting on their own Queen carnivals. The Queen Carnival tradition has been carried to other countries, including Fiji and Malta.

== A time line with various Queen Carnivals ==
Date	Location	Cou- ntry	Details
1910		NZ	The Kaikoura Star carried a report of a pageant and Queen Carnival to be held in March 1910, but it is not known if this went ahead.
26 December 1913	Napier, New Zealand	NZ	13 candidates for queen.
11 March 1914	Virginia Lake, Whanganui	NZ	12 candidates for queen, including a Māori lady.
27 August 1915	Dunedin	NZ	Relief of wounded soldiers
28 August 1915	Queensland	AU	Queen Carnivals associated with Queensland Patriotic Day; carnivals held in Brisbane, Beaudesert, Boonah, Croydon & Roma.
2 October 1915	Balmain, New South Wales	AU	Queen Carnival. Miss Edith Butt crowned. Total £1,250 raised in aid of local hospital, Rozelle Band & Civil Ambulance.
9 November 1915	Hobart, Tasmania	AU	Patriotic Queen Carnival. Miss Millie Jones, Queen of the Citizens crowned. Total £9,510.10 raised.
4 December 1915	Gallipoli	TR	9th Field Artillery Battery, 1st AIF, won by "Ranji Randolph"; £43 10s. 6d. raised for Tasmanian Wounded Soldiers' Fund.
1916	Auckland	NZ	Queens wharf.
1916	Albany	AU	
1917	Mepanga East	NZ	
1919	Werribee	AU	
c. 1919	Atherton	AU	
1922	Woombye	AU	
1922	Northcote	NZ	
1924	New Plymouth	NZ	Funds for Pukekura Park.
28 August 1924	Rongotea	NZ	Funds for sports grounds.
10 October 1924	Seaford, Victoria	AU	Fund-raiser for Seaford Football Club (Australian Rules), won by the Queen of Dancing Miss Lillian Edwards
1925	Gisborne	NZ	Funds to construct a swimming pool.
1925	St Andrews Parish	AU	
1926	Northland	NZ	
1926	Ballarat	AU	
1926	Ongarue	NZ	School improvement fund.
1926	Warkworth	NZ	To raise funds for a permanent Plunket nurse. Carnival ran from June with the crowning ceremony on August 6.
1929	Birkenhead	NZ	Funds for the Fire Brigade.
1931	Waitua	NZ	Funds went to building local facilities, including a swimming pool
1934	Ngaio Railway Settlement	NZ	Settle a debt of £1000 on the Church of England
1935	Christchurch	NZ	Relief of Distress
1936	Johnsonville, Wellington	NZ	Johnsonville Catholic parish, to raise funds for convent school
1940	Perth	AU	
1940	Suva	FJ	In aid of Red Cross
1941	Nelson	NZ	
1941	Wellington	NZ	Victory Queen Carnival grand finale; Queen of Hutt Valley was a Rarotongan woman, Mrs E T W Rio Love.
1941	Apia	SM	raised money for war funds
1941	Melbourne	AU	
1943	Melbourne	AU	Lord Mayor's Allies Day Appeal
1944	Vogeltown	NZ	School hall
1953	Oparure	NZ	
1954	Bondi	AU	
1955	Matapihi	NZ	Māori hostel & 1956 Matapihi Footbridge Appeal
1956	Apia	SM	Raised almost £5000 for St Mary's High School
1957	Feilding	NZ	Civic Centre
1958	Hastings	NZ	
1965	Paeroa	NZ	College Gymnasium.
1968	Taumarunui	NZ	Red Cross
1970	Upper Hutt	NZ	Community Centre
1970	Vatukoula	FJ	
1985	Northern Tasmania	AU	Football Association
2008	Nadur Gozo Island	Malta	
2008	Wauchope, New South Wales	AU	

== Popular culture ==
- Turnley, J. Bette and the Queen Carnival - ISBN 978-0-947189-70-9, Random House Australia, 1990
- Duder, T. Mercury Beach - ISBN 9780140385755, Puffin, 1997
