= Beverly Aadland =

American film actress (1942–2010)

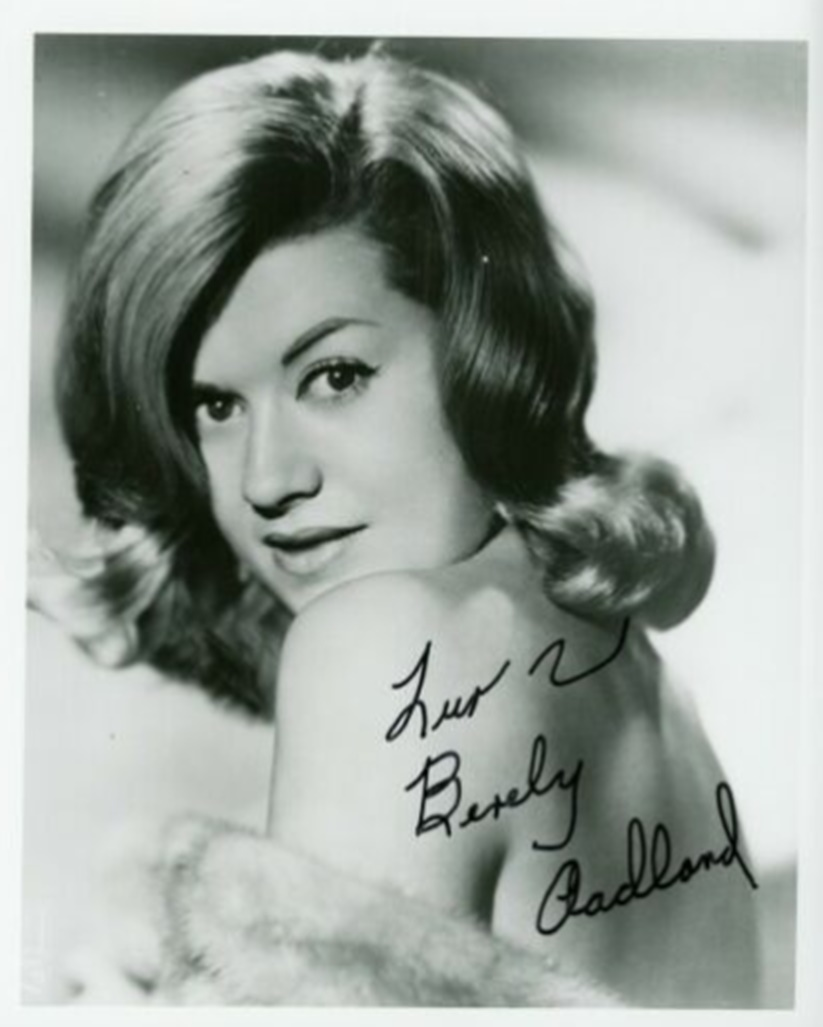
- Born: Beverly Elaine Aadland; September 16, 1942; Los Angeles, California, U.S.
- Died: January 5, 2010 (aged 67); Lancaster, California, U.S.
- Occupation: Actress
- Years active: 1951–2010
- Spouses: Maurice Jose de Leon (m. 1961; div. 1964); Joseph E. McDonald (m. 1967; div. 1969); Ronald Fisher (m. 1969)
- Children: 1

Beverly Elaine Aadland (September 16, 1942 – January 5, 2010) was an American film and television actress.

She appeared in films including South Pacific. As a teenager, she co-starred in the Errol Flynn film Cuban Rebel Girls, and had a relationship with him.

== Early years ==
Aadland was born in the Hollywood neighborhood of Los Angeles. She entered show business as a child, appearing in the film Death of a Salesman (1951).

== Biography ==
Aadland was 17 when she was with actor Errol Flynn as he died of a heart attack on October 14, 1959, in Vancouver, British Columbia at the age of 50. In 1961, Aadland's mother, Florence Aadland, alleged in the book The Big Love that actor Flynn had a relationship with her daughter starting at age 15. The book would be turned into a one-woman Broadway show starring Tracey Ullman as Florence. The memoir was reissued in 2018 by Spurl Editions. Beverly Aadland gave an account of her relationship with Flynn in People in 1988, confirming that she had had a sexual relationship with Flynn in her teens and that she was with him at the time of his death.

Her relationship with Flynn was the subject of the 2013 movie The Last of Robin Hood, in which Aadland was played by Dakota Fanning.

=== Personal life ===
In 1960, William Stanciu, her then boyfriend, died in her apartment after being shot in a struggle between the two. That event led to her being a ward of the court for the following year.

Aadland was married and divorced twice before she married Ronald Fisher in the late 1960s. The couple had a daughter.

Aadland died on January 5, 2010, at the Lancaster Community Hospital from complications of diabetes and congestive heart failure. She was 67 years old.

== Filmography ==
- Death of a Salesman (1951) as Girl (uncredited)
- You Bet Your Life (S8.E9, 1957) - Contestant, performed "All Shook Up"
- South Pacific (1958) as Nurse in Thanksgiving Show
- Too Much, Too Soon (1958) as Blonde at Studio Party (uncredited)
- The Roots of Heaven (1958) as Blonde Dancer (uncredited)
- Cuban Rebel Girls (1959) as Beverly Woods
- The Red Skelton Show (1959) as Beatnik Girl
