= Beam Ends =

1937 novel by Errol Flynn

- Author: Errol Flynn
- Language: English
- Genre: Adventure novel
- Publication date: 1937
- Media type: Print (hardback & paperback)

Beam Ends is a 1937 semi-autobiographical novel by Australian actor Errol Flynn. Upon publication, reviews positioned the book variously as fiction and non-fiction. It was understood as "a graphic account of an adventurous and almost fatal trip that [Flynn] made in a small schooner from Australia to New Guinea." Another reviewer purported that it "deals at length on [Flynn's] Sydney days, and his subsequent voyage up the east coast of Australia."

Beam Ends was Flynn's first novel, although he had written nonfiction for many years. An anonymous book reviewer in Smith's Weekly wrote:

"Beam Ends" is sufficient proof that [Flynn] would have made a very good journalist. He tells the "Sirocco" story in pithy, terse English, and his descriptions of Barrier Reef scenery and storms at sea are couched in well-turned "purple patches" that would earn a rise in salary for most newspaper descriptive writers. Nicely etched are his sketches of strange characters they met in Coffs Harbor, Brisbane, Bundaberg, Rockhampton, Mackay, Townsville and Cairns.

== Film adaptation ==
In 2018, the book was adapted by Australian director Russell Mulcahy. It was released under the title In Like Flynn.
