= Errol Flynn =

Australian and American actor (1909–1959)

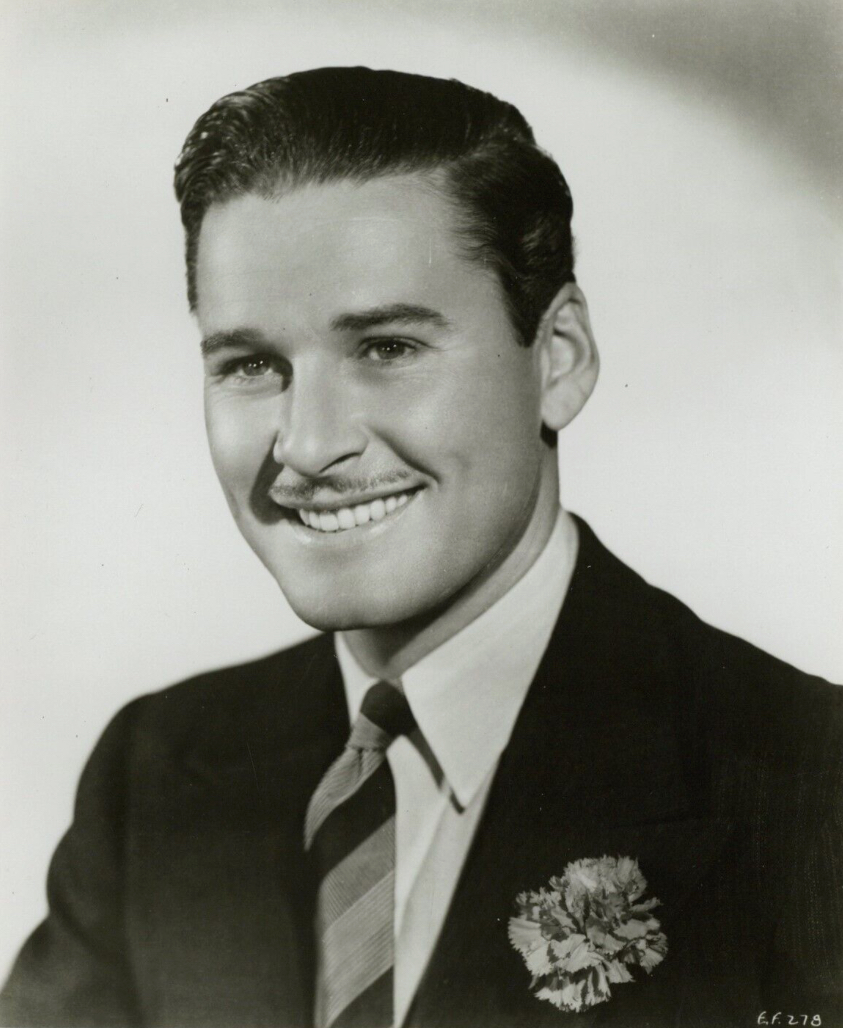
- Flynn in 1936
- Born: 20 June 1909; Battery Point, Tasmania, Australia
- Died: 14 October 1959 (aged 50); Vancouver, British Columbia, Canada
- Resting place: Forest Lawn Memorial Park, Glendale, California, US
- Citizenship: Australia (until 1942); United States (from 1942)
- Occupation: Actor
- Years active: 1932–1959
- Spouses: Lili Damita (m. 1935; div. 1942) Nora Eddington (m. 1943; div. 1949) Patrice Wymore (m. 1950)
- Children: 4, including Sean Flynn
- Father: Theodore Thomson Flynn
- Relatives: Sean Flynn (grandson)
- Awards: Hollywood Walk of Fame

Errol Leslie Thomson Flynn (20 June 1909 – 14 October 1959) was an Australian and American actor who achieved worldwide fame during the Golden Age of Hollywood. He was known for his romantic swashbuckler roles, frequent partnerships with Olivia de Havilland, and reputation for his womanising and hedonistic personal life.

Flynn's roles include Robin Hood in The Adventures of Robin Hood (1938), which was later named by the American Film Institute as the 18th-greatest hero in American film history; the lead role in Captain Blood (1935); Major Geoffrey Vickers in The Charge of the Light Brigade (1936); and as the hero in a number of Westerns such as Dodge City (1939), Santa Fe Trail, Virginia City (both 1940) and San Antonio (1945).

Flynn was posthumously awarded two stars on the Hollywood Walk of Fame for his contributions to the motion picture and television industries in 1960.

== Early life ==
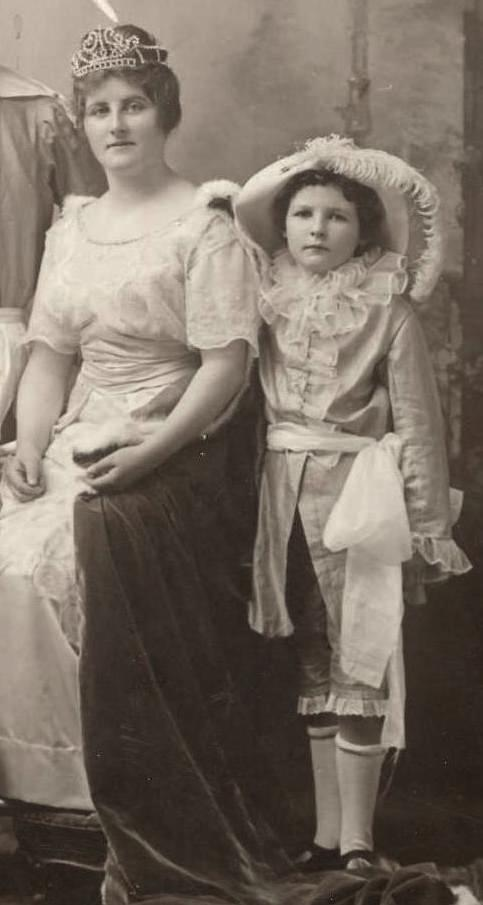
Flynn, alongside Enid Lyons, as a page boy in a queen carnival at the age of nine

Flynn at South West London College in 1923

Errol Leslie Thomson Flynn was born on 20 June 1909 at Queen Alexandra Hospital in Battery Point, Tasmania, Australia. His father, Theodore Thomson Flynn, was a lecturer (1909) and later professor (1911) of marine biology and zoology at the University of Tasmania and Queen's University of Belfast, where he served as the Chair of Zoology. His father was the first biology professor in Tasmania.

His mother was born Lily Mary Young. Shortly after marrying Theodore at St John's Church of England, Birchgrove, New South Wales, on 23 January 1909, she changed her first name to Marelle. Flynn had a younger sister, Nora Rosemary Flynn (1919–1981). Flynn described his mother's family as "seafaring folk" and this appears to be where his lifelong interest in boats and the sea originated. Both of his parents were Australian-born of Irish, English and Scottish descent. Despite Flynn's claims, the evidence indicates that he was not descended from any of the Bounty mutineers.

Flynn received his early schooling in Hobart. Future World Correspondence Chess Champion Cecil Purdy was one of his classmates. He attended The Hutchins School, Hobart College, The Friends School and Albuera Street Primary School and was expelled from each one. He made one of his first appearances as a performer in 1918, aged nine, when he served as a page boy to Enid Lyons in a queen carnival.

In her memoirs, Lyons recalled Flynn as "a dashing figure—a handsome boy of nine with a fearless, somewhat haughty expression, already showing that sang-froid for which he was later to become famous throughout the civilised world". She further noted: "Unfortunately, Errol, at the age of nine, did not yet possess that magic for extracting money from the public which so distinguished his career as an actor. Our cause gained no apparent advantage from his presence in my entourage; we gained only third place in a field of seven."

From 1923 to 1925, Flynn attended the South West London College, a private boarding school in Barnes, London. In 1926, he returned to Australia to attend Sydney Church of England Grammar School (known as "Shore"), where he was the classmate of a future Australian prime minister, John Gorton. His formal education ended with his expulsion from Shore for theft, although he later claimed it was for a sexual encounter with the school's laundress.

After being dismissed from a job as a junior clerk with a Sydney shipping company for pilfering petty cash, he went to Papua New Guinea at the age of eighteen, seeking his fortune in tobacco planting and gold mining in the Morobe Goldfield. He spent the next five years oscillating between living in New Guinea and Sydney. In January 1931, Flynn became engaged to Naomi Campbell-Dibbs, the youngest daughter of Robert and Emily Hamlyn (Brown) Campbell-Dibbs of Temora and Bowral, New South Wales. They did not marry.

== Early career ==
=== In the Wake of the Bounty (1933) ===
Australian filmmaker Charles Chauvel was making a film about the mutiny on the Bounty, In the Wake of the Bounty (1933), a combination of dramatic re-enactments of the mutiny and a documentary on present-day Pitcairn Island. Chauvel was looking for someone to play the role of Fletcher Christian. There are different stories about the way Flynn was cast. According to one, Chauvel saw his picture in an article about a yacht wreck involving Flynn. The most popular account is that he was discovered by cast member John Warwick. The film was not a strong success at the box office, but Flynn was the lead role, leading him to travel to Britain in late 1933 to pursue a career in acting. Flynn claimed to be Fletcher Christian's descendant.

=== Britain ===
Flynn got work as an extra in a film, I Adore You (1933), produced by Irving Asher for Warner Bros. He soon secured a job with the Northampton Repertory Company at the town's Royal Theatre (now part of Royal & Derngate), where he worked and received his training as a professional actor for seven months. He performed at the 1934 Malvern Festival and in Glasgow, and briefly in London's West End.

In 1934, Flynn was dismissed from Northampton Rep. after he threw a female stage manager down a stairwell. He returned to London. Asher cast him as the lead in Murder at Monte Carlo, a "quota quickie" made by Warner Brothers at their Teddington Studios in Middlesex. The movie was not widely seen (it is a lost film), but Asher was enthusiastic about Flynn's performance and cabled Warner Bros in Hollywood, recommending him for a contract. Executives agreed, and Flynn was sent to Los Angeles.

== Hollywood ==
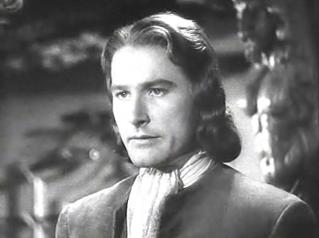

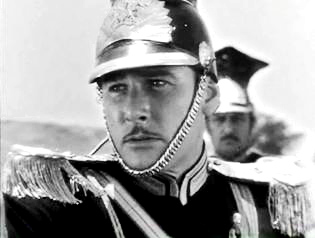
Flynn in the trailers for Captain Blood (1935) and The Charge of the Light Brigade (1936)

On the ship from London, Flynn met and eventually married Lili Damita, an actress five years his senior, whose contacts proved invaluable when Flynn arrived in Los Angeles. Warner Bros. publicity described him as an "Irish leading man of the London stage".

His first appearance was a small role in The Case of the Curious Bride (1935). Flynn had two scenes, one as a corpse and one in flashback. His next part was slightly bigger, in Don't Bet on Blondes (1935), a B-picture screwball comedy.

=== Captain Blood and stardom ===
Warner Bros. was preparing a big-budget swashbuckler, Captain Blood (1935), based on the 1922 novel by Rafael Sabatini and directed by Michael Curtiz.

The studio originally intended to cast Robert Donat, but he turned down the part, afraid that his chronic asthma would make it impossible for him to perform the strenuous role. Warners considered a number of other actors, including Leslie Howard and James Cagney, and also conducted screen tests of those they had under contract, like Flynn. The tests were impressive, and Warners finally cast Flynn in the lead, opposite 19-year-old Olivia de Havilland. The resulting film was a magnificent success for the studio and gave birth to two new Hollywood stars and an on-screen partnership that would encompass eight films over six years. The budget for Captain Blood was $1.242 million, and it made $1.357 million in the U.S. and $1.733 million overseas, meaning a huge profit for Warner Bros.

Flynn had been selected to support Fredric March in Anthony Adverse (1936), but public response to Captain Blood was so enthusiastic that Warners instead reunited him with de Havilland and Curtiz in another adventure tale, this time set during the Crimean War, The Charge of the Light Brigade (1936). The film was given a slightly larger budget than Captain Blood, at $1.33 million, and it had a much higher box-office gross, earning $1.454 million in the U.S. and $1.928 million overseas, making it Warner Bros.' No. 1 hit of 1936.

Flynn asked for a different kind of role, so when ill health made Leslie Howard drop out of the screen adaptation of Lloyd C. Douglas' inspirational novel, Flynn got the lead role in Green Light (1937), playing a doctor searching for a cure for Rocky Mountain spotted fever. The studio then put him back into another swashbuckler, replacing Patric Knowles as Miles Hendon in The Prince and the Pauper (1937). He appeared opposite Kay Francis in Another Dawn (1937), a melodrama set in a mythical British desert colony. Warners then gave Flynn his first starring role in a modern comedy, The Perfect Specimen (1937), with Joan Blondell, under the direction of Curtiz. Meanwhile, Flynn published his first book, Beam Ends (1937), an autobiographical account of his experiences sailing around Australia as a youth. He also travelled to Spain, in 1937, as a war correspondent during the Spanish Civil War, in which he sympathised with the Republicans.

=== The Adventures of Robin Hood (1938) ===
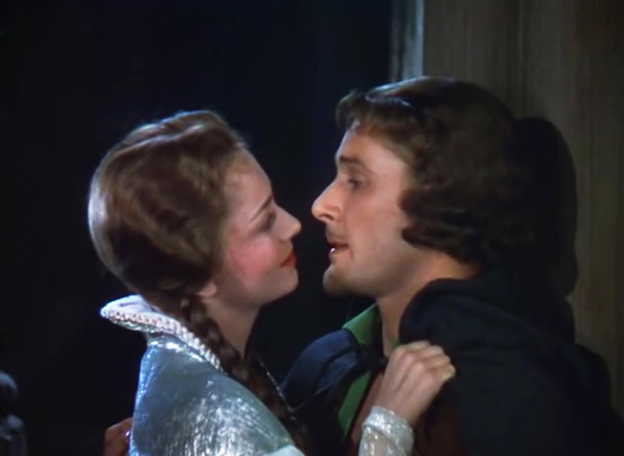
With Olivia de Havilland in The Adventures of Robin Hood (1938)

Flynn followed this with his most famous movie, The Adventures of Robin Hood (1938), playing the title role, opposite de Havilland's Marian. This movie was a global success. It was the sixth-highest movie grosser of 1938. It was also the studio's first large-budget colour film using the three-strip Technicolor process. The budget for Robin Hood was the highest ever for a Warner Bros. production up to that point—$2.47 million—but it more than made back its costs and turned a huge profit as it grossed $2.343 million in the U.S. and $2.495 million overseas.

It received lavish praise from critics and became a world favourite; in 2019, Rotten Tomatoes summarised the critical consensus: "Errol Flynn thrills as the legendary title character, and the film embodies the type of imaginative family adventure tailor-made for the silver screen". In 1995, the film was deemed "culturally, historically, or aesthetically significant" by the United States Library of Congress and selected for preservation by the National Film Registry.

In a 2005 interview, de Havilland described how, during the filming, she decided to tease Flynn, whose wife was on the set and watching closely. De Havilland said, "And so we had one kissing scene, which I looked forward to with great delight. I remember I blew every take, at least six in a row, maybe seven, maybe eight, and we had to kiss all over again. And Errol Flynn got really rather uncomfortable, and he had, if I may say so, a little trouble with his tights."

The final duel between Robin and Sir Guy of Gisbourne (Basil Rathbone) is a classic, echoing the battle on the beach in Captain Blood where Flynn also kills Rathbone's character after a long demonstration of fine swordplay, in that case choreographed by Ralph Faulkner. According to Faulkner's student, Tex Allen, "Faulkner had good material to work with. Veteran Basil Rathbone was a good fencer already, and Flynn, though new to the school of fence, was athletic and a quick learner".

The success of The Adventures of Robin Hood did little to convince the studio that their prize swashbuckler should be allowed to do other things, but Warners allowed Flynn to try a screwball comedy, Four's a Crowd (1938). Despite the presence of de Havilland and the direction of Curtiz, it was not a success. The Sisters (1938), a drama showing the lives of three sisters in the years from 1904 to 1908, including a dramatic rendering of the 1906 San Francisco earthquake, was more popular. Flynn played alcoholic sports reporter Frank Medlin, who sweeps Louise Elliott (Bette Davis) off her feet on a visit to Silver Bow, Montana. Their married life in San Francisco is difficult, and Frank sails to Singapore just hours before the catastrophe. The original ending of the film was the same as the book: Louise married a character named William Benson, but preview audiences disliked the ending, and a new one was filmed in which Frank comes to Silver Bow to find her, and they reconcile. Apparently, audiences wanted Errol Flynn to "get the girl" or vice versa. Bette Davis preferred the original ending.

Flynn had a powerful dramatic role in The Dawn Patrol (1938), a remake of a pre-code 1930 drama of the same title about Royal Flying Corps fighter pilots in World War I and the devastating burden carried by officers who must send men out to die every morning. Flynn and co-stars Basil Rathbone and David Niven led a cast that was all male and predominantly British. Director Edmund Goulding's biographer Matthew Kennedy wrote: "Everyone remembered a set filled with fraternal good cheer.... The filming of Dawn Patrol was an unusual experience for everyone connected with it, and dissipated for all time the legend that Britishers are lacking in a sense of humor.... The picture was made to the accompaniment of more ribbing than Hollywood has ever witnessed. The setting for all this horseplay was the beautiful English manners of the cutterups. The expressions of polite and pained shock on the faces of Niven, Flynn, Rathbone et al., when (women) visitors were embarrassed was the best part of the nonsense."

In 1939, Flynn and de Havilland teamed up with Curtiz for Dodge City (1939), the first Western for both of them, set after the U.S. Civil War. Flynn was worried that audiences would not accept him in Westerns, but the film was Warner's most popular film of 1939, and he went on to make a number of movies in that genre.

=== Second World War ===
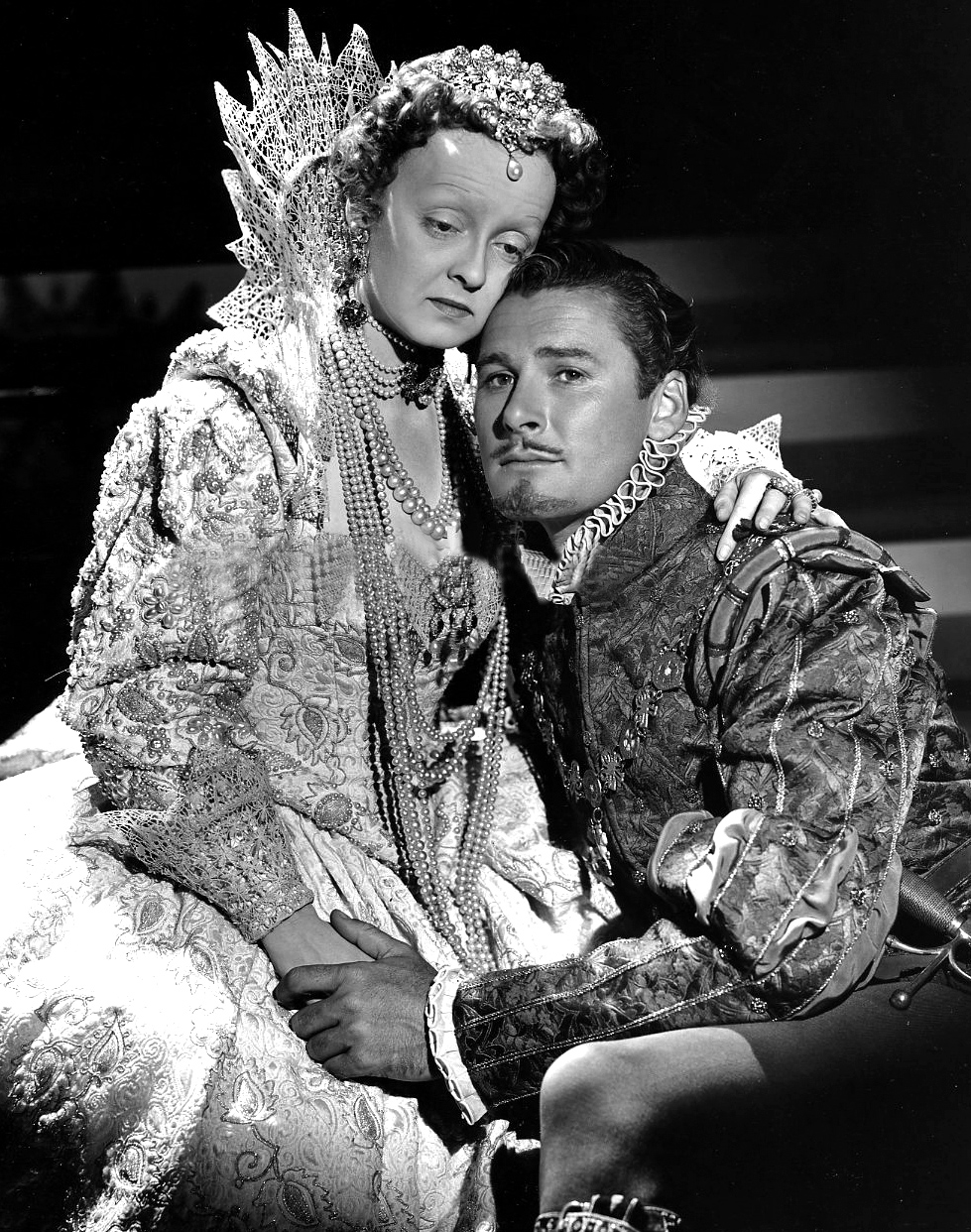
With Bette Davis in The Private Lives of Elizabeth and Essex (1939)

Flynn was reunited with Davis, Curtiz and de Havilland in The Private Lives of Elizabeth and Essex (1939), playing Robert Devereux, 2nd Earl of Essex. Flynn's relationship with Davis during filming was quarrelsome; Davis allegedly slapped him across the face far harder than necessary during one scene. Flynn attributed her anger to unrequited romantic interest, but according to others, Davis resented sharing equal billing with a man she considered incapable of playing any role beyond a dashing adventurer. "He himself openly said, 'I don't know really anything about acting,'" she told an interviewer, "and I admire his honesty because he's absolutely right." Years later, however, de Havilland said that during a private screening of Elizabeth and Essex, an astounded Davis had exclaimed, "Damn it! The man could act!"

Warners put Flynn in another Western, Virginia City (1940), set near the end of the Civil War. Flynn played Union officer Kerry Bradford. In an article for TCM, Jeremy Arnold wrote: "Ironically, the Randolph Scott role [as Captain Vance Irby, commandant of the prison camp where Bradford was a prisoner of war] was originally conceived for Flynn.... In fact, Virginia City was plagued with script, production and personnel problems all along. Shooting began without a finished script, angering Flynn, who complained unsuccessfully to the studio about it.

Flynn disliked the temperamental Curtiz and tried to have him removed from the film. Curtiz didn't like Flynn (or co-star Miriam Hopkins) either. Humphrey Bogart apparently did not care for Flynn or Randolph Scott. Making matters worse was the steady rain that fell for two of the three weeks of location shooting near Flagstaff, Arizona. Flynn detested rain and was physically unwell for quite some time because of it. As Peter Valenti has written, "Errol's frustration at the role can be easily understood: he changed from antagonist to protagonist, from Southern to Northern officer, almost as the film was being shot. [This] intensified Errol's feelings of inadequacy as a performer and his contempt for studio operation". Despite the troubles behind the scenes, the film was a huge success, making a profit of just under $1 million.

Flynn's next film had been planned since 1936: another swashbuckler taken from a Sabatini novel, The Sea Hawk (1940), but only the title was used. A reviewer observed in Time 19 August 1940, "The Sea Hawk (Warner) is 1940's lustiest assault on the double feature. It cost $1,700,000 and exhibits Errol Flynn and 3,000 other cinema actors performing every imaginable feat of spectacular derring-do, and lasts two hours and seven minutes... Produced by Warner's Hal Wallis with a splendour that would set parsimonious Queen Bess's teeth on edge, constructed of the most tried-and-true cinema materials available, The Sea Hawk is a handsome, shipshape picture. To Irish [sic] Cinemactor Errol Flynn, it gives the best swashbuckling role he has had since Captain Blood. For Hungarian Director Michael Curtiz, who took Flynn from bit-player ranks to make Captain Blood and has made nine pictures with him since, it should prove a high point in their profitable relationship." It was not, but The Sea Hawk made a profit of $977,000 on that budget of $1.7 million.

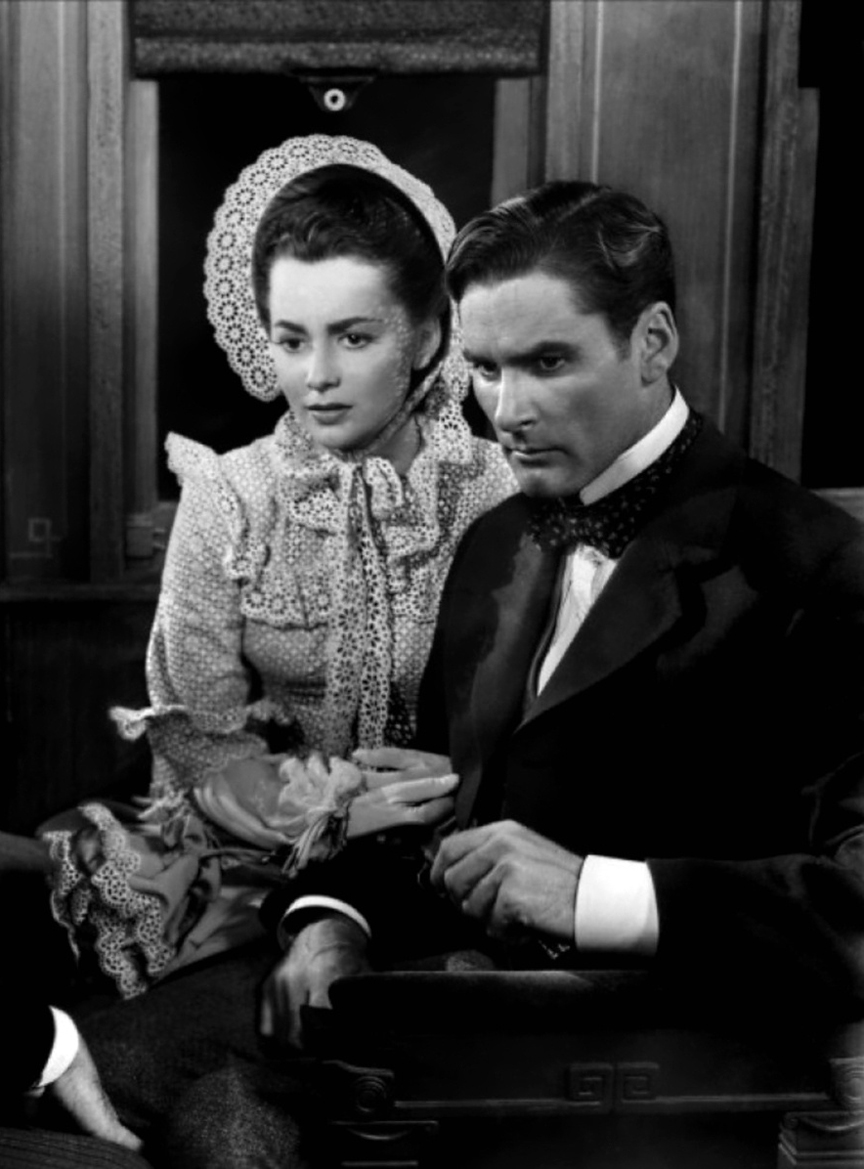
With Olivia de Havilland in Santa Fe Trail (1940)

Another financial success was the Western Santa Fe Trail (1940), with de Havilland and Ronald Reagan and directed by Curtiz, which grossed $2,147,663 in the U.S., making it Warner Brothers' second-biggest hit of 1940. At the zenith of his career, Flynn was voted the fourteenth most popular star in the U.S. and the seventh most popular in Britain according to Motion Picture Daily. According to Variety, he was the fourth-biggest star in the U.S. and the fourth-biggest box-office attraction overseas as well.

Flynn consistently ranked among Warner Bros.'s top stars. In 1937, he was the studio's No. 1 star, ahead of Paul Muni and Bette Davis. In 1938, he was No. 3, just behind Davis and Muni. In 1939, he was No. 3 again, this time behind Davis and James Cagney. In 1940 and 1941, he was Warner Bros.'s No. 1 top box-office draw. In 1942, he was No. 2, behind Cagney. In 1943, he was No. 2, behind Humphrey Bogart. Warners allowed Flynn a change of pace from a long string of period pieces in a light-hearted mystery, Footsteps in the Dark (1941). Los Angeles Times' Edwin Schallert wrote: "Errol Flynn becomes a modern for a change in a whodunit film and the excursion proves eminently worth-while... an exceptionally clever and amusing exhibit ..." The film was not a big success; far more popular was the military drama Dive Bomber (1941), his last film with Curtiz.

In later years, Footsteps in the Dark co-star Ralph Bellamy recalled Flynn at this time as "a darling. Couldn't or wouldn't take himself seriously. And he drank like there was no tomorrow. Had a bum ticker from the malaria he'd picked up in Australia. Also, a spot of TB. Tried to enlist but flunked his medical, so he drank some more. Knew he wouldn't live into old age. He really had a ball in Footsteps in the Dark. He was so glad to be out of swashbucklers".

Flynn became a naturalised American citizen on 14 August 1942. With the United States fully involved in the Second World War, he attempted to enlist in the armed services but failed the physical exam due to recurrent malaria (contracted in New Guinea), a heart murmur, various venereal diseases and latent pulmonary tuberculosis. Flynn was mocked by reporters and critics as a "draft dodger" because the studio refused to admit that their star, promoted for his physical beauty and athleticism, had been disqualified due to health problems.

Flynn started a new long-term relationship with a director when he teamed with Raoul Walsh in They Died with Their Boots On (1942), a biopic of George Armstrong Custer. De Havilland was his co-star in this, the last of eight films they made together. The movie grossed $2.55 million in the U.S. alone, making it Warner Bros.' second-biggest hit of 1942. Flynn's first World War II film was Desperate Journey (1942), directed by Walsh, in which he played an Australian for the first time. It was another big hit.

The role of Gentleman Jim Corbett in Walsh's Gentleman Jim (1942) was one of Flynn's favourites. Warner Bros. purchased the rights to make a film of Corbett's life from his widow, Vera, specifically for their handsome, athletic and charming leading man. The movie bears little resemblance to the boxer's life, but the story was a crowd-pleaser. Despite—or perhaps because of—its departure from reality, Gentleman Jim packed the theatres. According to Variety, it was the third Errol Flynn movie to gross at least $2 million for Warner Bros. in 1942.

Flynn eagerly undertook extensive boxing training for this film, working with Buster Wiles and Mushy Callahan. Callahan's remembrances were documented in Charles Higham's Errol Flynn: The Untold Story. "Errol tended to use his right fist. I had to teach him to use his left and to move very fast on his feet...Luckily, he had excellent footwork, he was dodgy, [and] he could duck faster than anybody I saw. And by the time I was through with him, he'd jab, jab, jab with his left like a veteran".

Flynn took the role seriously and was rarely doubled during the boxing sequences. In The Two Lives of Errol Flynn by Michael Freedland, Alexis Smith told of taking the star aside: "'It's so silly, working all day and then playing all night and dissipating yourself. Don't you want to live a long life?' Errol was his usually apparently unconcerned self: 'I'm only interested in this half,' he told her. 'I don't care for the future. '" Flynn collapsed on set on 15 July 1942, while filming a boxing scene with Ward Bond. Filming was shut down while he recovered; he returned a week later. In his autobiography, My Wicked, Wicked Ways, Flynn describes the episode as a mild heart attack. In September 1942, Warners announced that Flynn had signed a new contract with the studio for four films a year, one of which he would also produce.

In Edge of Darkness (1943), set in Nazi-occupied Norway, Flynn played a Norwegian resistance fighter, a role originally intended for Edward G. Robinson. Director Lewis Milestone later recalled, "Flynn kept underrating himself. If you wanted to embarrass him, all you had to do was to tell him how great he was in a scene he'd just finished playing: He'd blush like a young girl and muttering 'I'm no actor' would go away somewhere and sit down". With a box office gross of $2.3 million in the U.S., it was Warner Bros.'s eighth-biggest movie of the year. In Warners' all-star musical comedy fund-raiser for the Stage Door Canteen, Thank Your Lucky Stars (1943), Flynn sings and dances as a cockney seaman boasting to his pub mates of how he's won the war in "That's What You Jolly Well Get", the only musical number that was ever performed by Flynn on screen.

=== Statutory rape charges ===
In late 1942, two 17-year-old girls, Betty Hansen and Peggy Satterlee, separately accused Flynn of statutory rape at the Bel Air home of Flynn's friend Frederick McEvoy, and on board Flynn's yacht Sirocco, respectively. The scandal received immense press attention. Many of Flynn's fans founded organisations to publicly protest the accusation. One such group, the American Boys' Club for the Defense of Errol Flynn—ABCDEF—accumulated a substantial membership that included William F. Buckley Jr.

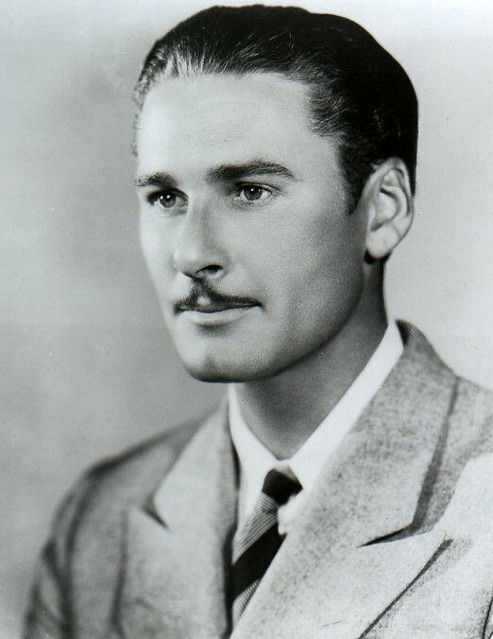
Flynn in the 1940s

The trial took place in late January and early February 1943. Satterlee testified that she had sex twice with Flynn aboard his boat when she was 15 years of age. Photographer Peter Stackpole, who joined Flynn's yacht cruise at Catalina Island on assignment for Life magazine, testified that Flynn and Satterlee spent hours together below decks, with the crew staying above, and that Satterlee was angry with Flynn and sullen afterward. Flynn denied everything, and blamed Stackpole's photography assignment for the presence of Satterlee on the yacht.

Flynn's attorney, Jerry Giesler, impugned the accusers' character and morals and accused them of numerous indiscretions, including affairs with married men and, in Satterlee's case, an abortion (which was illegal at the time). He noted that the two girls, who said they did not know each other, filed their complaints within days of each other, although the episodes allegedly took place more than a year apart. He implied that the girls had cooperated with prosecutors in hopes of avoiding prosecution themselves.

Flynn was acquitted, but the trial's widespread coverage and lurid overtones permanently damaged his carefully cultivated screen image as an idealised romantic leading player.

=== After the trial ===
Northern Pursuit (1943), also with Walsh as director, was a war film set in Canada. He then made a film for his own production company, Thomson Productions, where he had a say in the choice of vehicle, director and cast, plus a portion of the profits. Uncertain Glory (1944), a war-time drama set in France with Flynn as a criminal who redeems himself, was not a success, earning only a modest gross of $1.5 million. Thomson Productions made no more movies. Still, Flynn earned $175,000 in 1943. With Walsh he made Objective, Burma! in 1944, released in 1945, a war film set during the Burma Campaign. Although popular, it was withdrawn in Britain after protests that the role played by British troops was not given sufficient credit. A Western, San Antonio (1945), was also very popular, grossing $3.553 million in the U.S. and was Warner Bros.' third-biggest hit of the year.

=== Post-war career ===
Flynn tried comedy again with Never Say Goodbye (1946), a comedy of remarriage opposite Eleanor Parker, but it was not a success, grossing $1.77 million in the U.S. In 1946, Flynn published an adventure novel, Showdown, and earned a reported $184,000 (equivalent to $3,040,000 in 2025). Cry Wolf (1947) was a thriller with Flynn in a seemingly more villainous role. It was a moderate success at the box office. He was in a melodrama, Escape Me Never (1947), filmed in early 1946 and released in late 1947, which lost money. More popular was a Western with Walsh and Ann Sheridan, Silver River (1948). This was a hit, although its high cost meant it was not very profitable. Flynn drank so heavily on the set that he was effectively disabled after noon-hour, and a disgusted Walsh terminated their business relationship.

Warners tried returning Flynn to swashbucklers and the result was Adventures of Don Juan (1948). The film was very successful, becoming Warner Bros.' 4th-biggest hit of the year. As with some other Flynn films, it was more popular in Europe than the States, grossing $3.1 million there and $2.1 million in the U.S., with total earnings of $4.7 million on an approximate budget of $3.25 million. However, from this point on, Warner Bros. reduced the budgets of Flynn's films. In November 1947, Flynn signed a 15-year contract with Warner Bros. for $225,000 per film. His income totalled $214,000 that year, and $200,000 in 1948.

=== Later Warner films ===
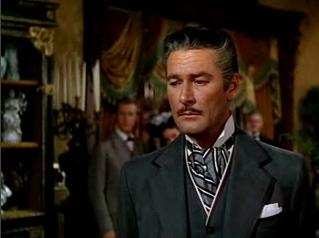
Flynn in That Forsyte Woman (1949)

After a cameo in Warner Bros.' Technicolor musical comedy It's a Great Feeling (1949), Flynn was borrowed by Metro-Goldwyn-Mayer to appear in That Forsyte Woman (1949), which made $1.855 million in the U.S. and $1.842 million abroad which was the eleventh-biggest hit of the year for MGM. He went on a three-month holiday then made two medium-budget Westerns for Warners, Montana (1950), which made $2.1 million and was Warner Bros.' fifth-biggest movie of the year, and Rocky Mountain (1950), which made $1.7 million in the U.S. and was Warner Bros.' ninth-biggest movie of the year.

He returned to MGM for Kim (1950), one of Flynn's most popular and profitable movies from this period, grossing $5.348 million ($2.896 million in the U.S. plus $2.452 million abroad, on a budget of $2.056 million) while making it MGM's fifth-biggest movie of the year by box office and eleventh biggest overall for Hollywood. It was shot partly in India. On his way home, he shot some scenes for a film he produced, Hello God (1951), directed by William Marshall; it was never released. For many years, this was considered a lost film, but in 2013, a copy was discovered in the basement of the surrogate court of New York City. Two of seven cans of the movie had deteriorated beyond hope, but five survived and were sent to the George Eastman House film archive for restoration.

Flynn wrote and co-produced his next film, the low-budget Adventures of Captain Fabian (1951), directed by Marshall and shot in France. Flynn wrote articles, novels and scripts but never had the discipline to turn writing into a full-time career. Flynn wound up suing Marshall over both movies. For Warners, he appeared in an adventure tale set in the Philippines, Mara Maru (1952). That studio released a documentary of a 1946 voyage he had taken on his yacht, Cruise of the Zaca (1952). In August 1951, he signed a one-picture deal to make a movie for Universal in exchange for a percentage of the profits: this was Against All Flags (1952), a popular swashbuckler. In 1952, he was seriously ill with hepatitis, resulting in liver damage. In England, he made another swashbuckler for Warners, The Master of Ballantrae (1953). After that, Warners ended their contract with him and their association that had lasted for 18 years and 35 films.

=== Europe ===
Flynn relocated his career to Europe, starting with a swashbuckler in Italy, Crossed Swords (1954). This inspired him to produce a similar movie in that country, The Story of William Tell (1953), directed by Jack Cardiff with himself in the title role. The movie fell apart during production, was never finished, and ruined Flynn financially. Desperate for money, he accepted an offer from Herbert Wilcox to support Anna Neagle in a British musical, Lilacs in the Spring (1954). Also shot in Britain was The Dark Avenger (1955), for Allied Artists, in which Flynn played Edward the Black Prince. Wilcox used him with Neagle again in King's Rhapsody (1955), but it was not a success, ending plans for further Wilcox-Flynn collaborations. In 1956 he presented and sometimes performed in the British-filmed television anthology series The Errol Flynn Theatre, perhaps most notably in the episode entitled "The Strange Auction". Paired not merely with his then current wife, Patrice Wymore (with whom he had appeared previously and would do so again during the course of this series), but also—in their first and only onscreen collaboration—with son Sean (product of Flynn's first marriage, to actress Lili Damita), it is precisely this performance—or, rather, one specific moment therein—to which author Thomas McNulty devotes the final paragraph of his 2004 Flynn biography.

There is a moment in The Errol Flynn Theatre that is symbolic of his life. In the episode titled "The Strange Auction," Patrice Wymore asks him: "What is it that makes you keep wandering around?" And for a moment Flynn's eyes come alive and a weary smile lights up his features. "I don't know," he says, "I've often wondered myself. Chasing some sort of lucky star, I reckon. It always seems to be just over the horizon."

=== Return to Hollywood ===
Flynn received an offer to make his first Hollywood film in five years: Istanbul (1957), for Universal, which was not well received. He made a thriller shot in Cuba, The Big Boodle (1957), then had his best role in a long time in the blockbuster Ernest Hemingway adaptation The Sun Also Rises (1957) for producer Darryl F. Zanuck, which made $3 million in the U.S. Flynn's performance in the latter was well received and led to a series of roles where he played to type, assaying drunks. Warner Bros. cast him as John Barrymore in Too Much, Too Soon (1958), and Zanuck used him again in The Roots of Heaven which made $3 million (1958). He met with Stanley Kubrick to discuss a role in Lolita, but nothing came of it.

Flynn went to Cuba in late 1958 to film the self-produced B film Cuban Rebel Girls, where he met Fidel Castro and was an enthusiastic supporter of the Cuban Revolution. He wrote a series of newspaper and magazine articles for the New York Journal American and other publications documenting his time in Cuba with Castro. Flynn was the only journalist who happened to be with Castro the night Batista fled the country, and Castro learned of his victory in the revolution. Many of these pieces were lost until 2009 when they were rediscovered in a collection at the University of Texas at Austin's Dolph Briscoe Center for American History. He appeared in a short titled Cuban Story: The Truth About Fidel Castro Revolution (1959), his last-known work.

== Personal life ==
=== Lifestyle ===
Flynn developed a reputation for his promiscuity, hard drinking, chain smoking and, for a time in the 1940s, narcotics abuse. He was addicted to alcohol, tobacco, drugs and sex. He was linked romantically with Lupe Vélez. Carole Lombard is said to have resisted his advances but invited him to her extravagant parties. He was a regular attendee of William Randolph Hearst's equally lavish affairs at Hearst Castle, though he was once asked to leave after becoming excessively intoxicated.

While Flynn acknowledged his personal attraction to Olivia de Havilland, assertions by film historians that they were romantically involved during the filming of Robin Hood were denied by de Havilland. "Yes, we did fall in love, and I believe that this is evident in the screen chemistry between us", she told an interviewer in 2009. "But his circumstances [Flynn's marriage to Damita] at the time prevented the relationship going further. I have not talked about it a great deal but the relationship was not consummated. Chemistry was there, though. It was there."

The expression "in like Flynn" is sometimes said to have been coined to refer to the supreme ease with which he reputedly seduced women, but its origin is disputed. Flynn was reportedly fond of the expression and later claimed that he wanted to call his memoir In Like Me. The publisher insisted on the title My Wicked, Wicked Ways.

Flynn had mirrors and hiding places constructed inside his mansion, including an overhead trapdoor above a guest bedroom for surreptitious viewing. Rolling Stones guitarist Ronnie Wood toured the house as a prospective buyer in the 1970s and reported, "Errol had two-way mirrors... speaker systems in the ladies' room. Not for security. Just that he was an A-1 voyeur." In March 1955, the popular Hollywood gossip magazine Confidential ran a salacious article titled "The Greatest Show in Town... Errol Flynn and His Two-Way Mirror!" In her 1966 biography, actress Hedy Lamarr wrote, "Many of the bathrooms have peepholes or ceilings with squares of opaque glass through which you can't see out but someone can see in."

Flynn had a Schnauzer dog named Arno, which was specially trained to protect him. They went together to premieres, parties, restaurants and clubs until the dog's death in 1941. On 15 June 1938, during filming, Arno bit Bette Davis on the ankle in a scene where she struck Flynn.

=== Marriages and family ===
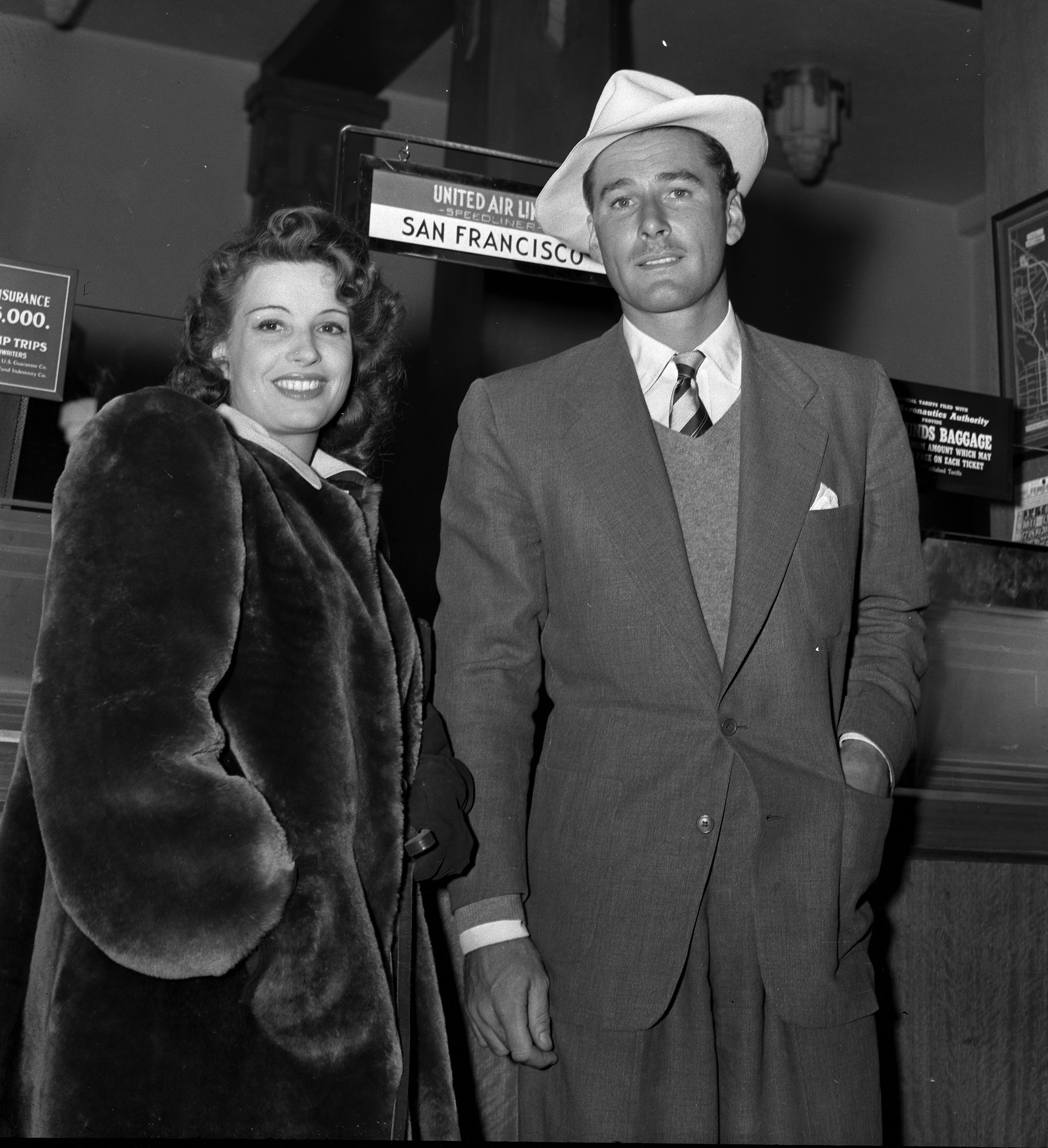
Flynn and first wife Lili Damita at Los Angeles airport in 1941

Flynn was married three times: to actress Lili Damita from 1935 until 1942 (one son, Sean Flynn, born 1941); to Nora Eddington from 1943 to 1949 (two daughters, Deirdre, born 1945, and Rory, born 1947); and to actress Patrice Wymore from 1950 until his death in 1959 (one daughter, Arnella Roma, born 1953). He is the maternal grandfather to actor Sean Flynn, (Note: Not to be confused with his son with the same name.) through his daughter Rory, who starred in the TV series Zoey 101.

After quitting Hollywood, Flynn lived with Wymore in Port Antonio, Jamaica, in the early 1950s. He was largely responsible for developing tourism in this area and, for a while, owned a hotel there. He popularised trips down rivers on bamboo rafts.

Flynn's son, Sean Flynn, was an actor and war correspondent who disappeared in Cambodia in April 1970 during the Vietnam War. Sean and a colleague, Dana Stone, were working as freelance photojournalists for Time magazine. Neither man's body has ever been found. It is generally assumed that they were killed by Khmer Rouge guerrillas in 1970 or 1971. After a decade-long search financed by his mother, Sean was officially declared dead in 1984. Sean's life is recounted in the book Inherited Risk: Errol and Sean Flynn in Hollywood and Vietnam.

== Death ==
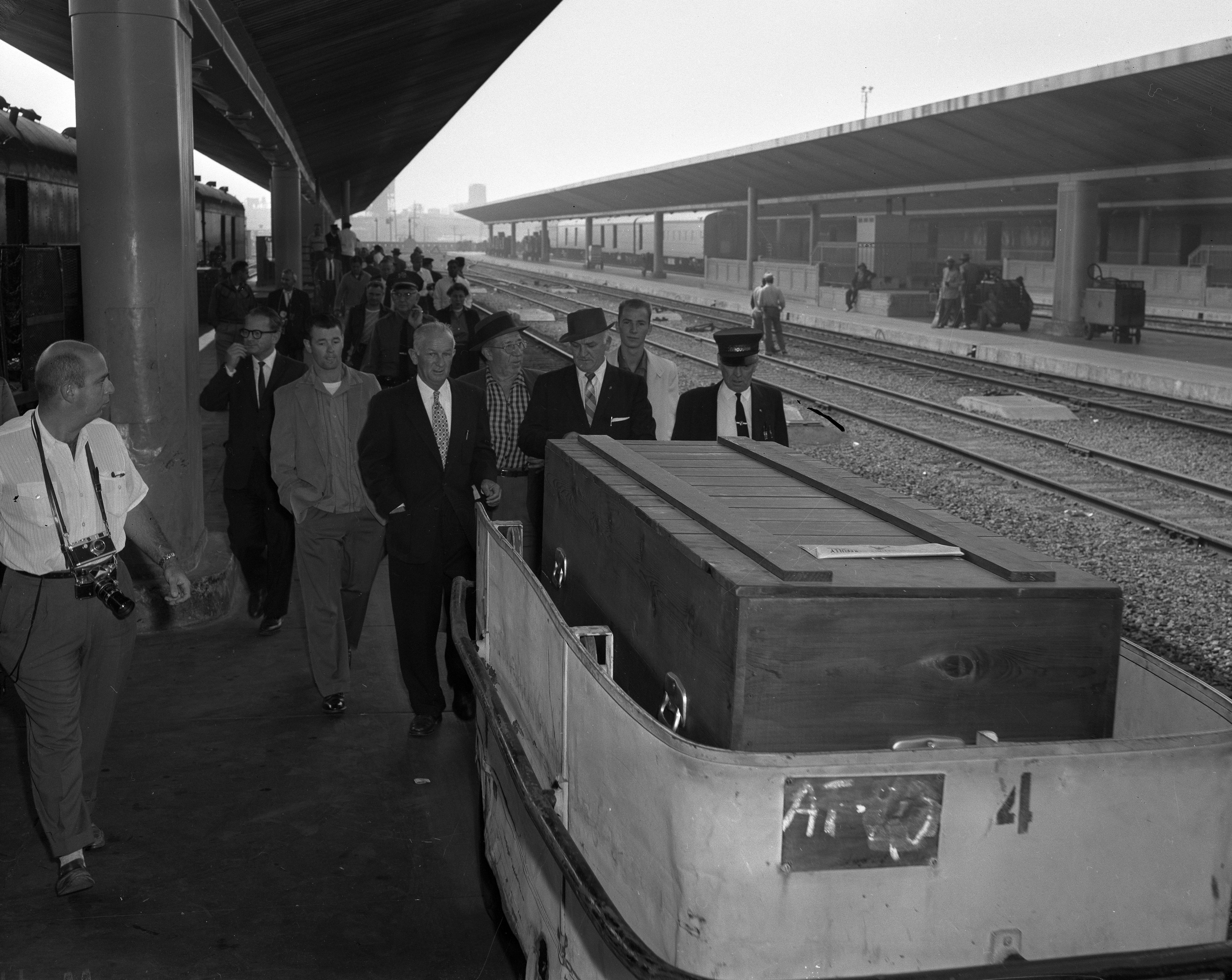
Flynn's coffin on a Union Station railway platform in Los Angeles

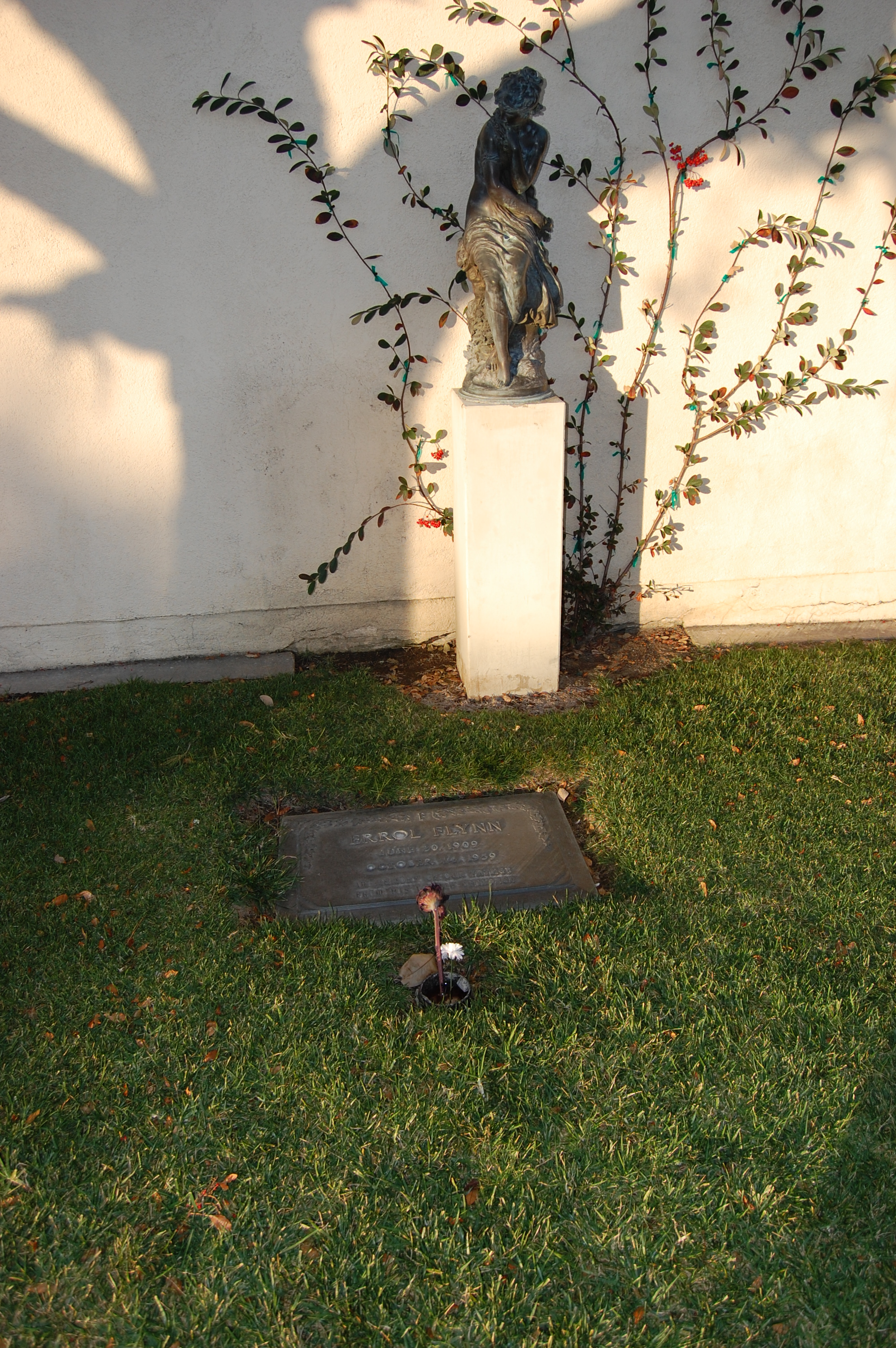
Flynn's grave marker at the Forest Lawn Memorial Park Cemetery

By 1959, Flynn's financial difficulties had become so serious that he flew on 9 October to Vancouver, British Columbia, to negotiate the lease of his yacht Zaca to the businessman George Caldough. As Caldough was driving Flynn and the 17-year-old actress Beverly Aadland, who had accompanied him on the trip, to the airport on 14 October for a Los Angeles-bound flight, Flynn began complaining of severe pain in his back and legs.

Caldough transported him to the residence of a doctor, Grant Gould, who noted that Flynn had considerable difficulty navigating the building's stairway. Gould, assuming that the pain was due to degenerative disc disease and spinal osteoarthritis, administered 50 milligrams of Demerol (pethidine) intravenously. As Flynn's discomfort diminished, he "reminisced at great length about his past experiences" to those present. He refused a drink when offered it.

Gould then performed a leg massage in the apartment's bedroom and advised Flynn to rest there before resuming his journey. Flynn responded that he felt "ever so much better." After 20 minutes Aadland checked on Flynn and discovered him unresponsive. Despite immediate emergency medical treatment from Gould and a transfer by ambulance to Vancouver General Hospital, he did not regain consciousness and was pronounced dead that evening.

The coroner's report and the death certificate noted the cause of death as a myocardial infarction (heart attack) due to coronary thrombosis and coronary atherosclerosis, with fatty degeneration of liver and partial cirrhosis of the liver significant enough to be listed as contributing factors. After his death, genital warts were reported to have been removed in previous medical treatment.

Flynn was buried at Forest Lawn Memorial Park Cemetery in Glendale, California, with six bottles of his favourite whisky.

In a 1969 interview, his daughter Deirdre said that at the time of his death more than a dozen creditors demanded payment for sums owed by Flynn years earlier. The estate had not yet been settled in 1969, and that she and her sister Rory received a "little money," proceeds from an insurance policy, and $30,000.

== Honors ==
In recognition for his contributions to the motion pictures and television industry, Flynn was awarded two stars on the Hollywood Walk of Fame in 1960. The star for motion pictures is located at 6654 Hollywood Boulevard and the star awarded for television is located at 7008 Hollywood Boulevard, Hollywood, California.

There is a street named after Flynn in San Antonio, Texas.

== Posthumous allegations ==
=== L. Ron Hubbard ===
In a 1982 interview with Penthouse magazine, Ronald DeWolf, son of the author L. Ron Hubbard, said that his father's friendship with Flynn was so strong that Hubbard's family considered Flynn an adoptive father to DeWolf. He said that Flynn and his father engaged in illegal activities together, including drug smuggling and sexual acts with underage girls, but that Flynn never joined Scientology, Hubbard's movement.

=== Spanish Civil War ===
Journalist George Seldes, who disliked Flynn intensely, wrote in his 1987 memoir that Flynn did not travel to Spain in 1937 to report on its civil war as announced or to deliver cash, medicine, supplies and food for the Republican soldiers, as promised. His purpose, according to Seldes, was to perpetrate a hoax that he triggered by sending an "apparently harmless" telegram from Madrid to Paris. The following day, American newspapers published an erroneous report that Flynn had been killed at the Spanish front. "The next day he left Spain ... . There were no ambulances, no medical supplies, no food for the Spanish Republic, and not one cent of money. The war correspondents said bitterly that it was the cruellest hoax of the time," Seldes wrote. "Flynn... had used a terrible war just to advertise one of his cheap movies."

=== Relationship with Beverly Aadland ===
In 1961, Beverly Aadland's mother, Florence, co-wrote The Big Love with Tedd Thomey, alleging that Flynn had been involved in a sexual relationship with her daughter, who was 15 when it began. The memoir was adapted in 1991 by Jay Presson Allen and her daughter Brooke Allen into a one-woman play, The Big Love, which starred Tracey Ullman as Florence Aadland in its New York premiere.

In 1996, Beverly Aadland gave an interview to Britain's Channel 4 documentary series Secret Lives corroborating the sexual relationship and claiming that the first time she and Flynn had sex, he had "forced himself" on her. She also said she loved him and wished they had more time together. "I was very lucky. He could have had any woman he wanted. Why it was me, I have no idea. Never will."

=== Charles Higham biography ===
In 1980, author Charles Higham wrote a highly controversial biography, Errol Flynn: The Untold Story, alleging that Flynn was a fascist sympathiser who spied for the Nazis before and during the Second World War and that he was bisexual and had multiple same-sex affairs. He claimed Flynn had arranged to have Dive Bomber filmed on location at the San Diego Naval Base for the benefit of Japanese military planners, who needed information on American warships and defence installations.

Higham pointed to Flynn's friendship with Hermann Erben, an Austrian doctor who had worked for the Nazis. Higham admitted that he had no evidence that Flynn was a German agent, but said he had "pieced together a mosaic that proves that he is". Flynn's friend David Niven criticised Higham for what he said were unfounded accusations.

In his autobiography, Iron Eyes Cody: My Life As A Hollywood Indian, Iron Eyes Cody also criticized Higham's book and described Flynn as "super straight". The review of the Higham book in the New York Times Book Review accused Higham of "shoddy reporting," providing no credible evidence of espionage.

Subsequent Flynn biographers are critical of Higham's allegations, and have found no evidence to corroborate them. Lincoln Hurst reported that Flynn attempted to join the OSS in 1942 and was put under surveillance by the FBI, which uncovered no subversive activities. Tony Thomas and Buster Wiles accused Higham of altering FBI documents to substantiate his claims. In 1981, Flynn's daughters, Rory and Deirdre, hired Melvin Belli to sue Higham and his publisher Doubleday for libel. The suit was dismissed on the grounds that a deceased person cannot, by definition, be libelled.

In 2000, Higham repeated his claim that Flynn had been a German agent, citing corroboration from Anne Lane, secretary to MI5 chief Sir Percy Sillitoe from 1946 to 1951 and the person responsible for maintaining Flynn's British intelligence service file. Higham acknowledged that he never saw the file itself and was unable to secure official confirmation of its existence. Higham wrote that government files that he accessed after writing his book showed evidence of Flynn's anti-Semitism and Nazi sympathies.

Writing in The Daily Beast in 2017, journalist Ron Capshaw wrote that while Flynn had called Erben "the greatest influence on his life" and had made antisemitic remarks, Capshaw concluded that it was "not likely" that Flynn had been a Nazi spy given his anti-fascism as evidenced by his support for the Republicans during the Spanish Civil War.

== Film portrayals ==
- The character of Alan Swann, portrayed by Peter O'Toole in the 1982 film My Favorite Year, was based on Flynn.
- The character of Neville Sinclair (played by Timothy Dalton) in the 1991 film The Rocketeer is based on Flynn; the character's Nazi affiliations are based on Charles Higham's uncorroborated claims in his book, Errol Flynn, the Untold Story.
- Guy Pearce portrayed the young Flynn in Flynn
- Jude Law portrayed Flynn in The Aviator
- Kevin Kline played Flynn in a film about his final days, The Last of Robin Hood, made in 2013.
- Thomas Cocquerel portrayed Flynn in his early life as an adventurer in In Like Flynn (2018).

== Other cultural references ==
- In the 1950 Warner Bros. Looney Tunes short The Scarlet Pumpernickel, the character Daffy Duck repeatedly references Errol Flynn, "Funny, that never happens to Errol Flynn."
- In the 1960 John Updike novel Rabbit, Run, the narrator jokes, "'Whodeya think's gonna come in that door? Errol Flynn?'"
- The 1965 Marvel Comics character Fandral, a companion of the Norse God Thor and a member of the Warriors Three, was based on the likeness of Flynn by co-creator Stan Lee. Actor Joshua Dallas, who played the character in Thor, based his portrayal on Flynn.
- Errol Flynn's life was the subject of the opera Flynn (1977–78) by British composer Judith Bingham. The score is titled: Music-theatre on the life and times of Errol Flynn, in three scenes, three solos, four duets, a mad song and an interlude.
- The 1981 Australian Crawl song "Errol" is a lyrical biography of the actor in which the singer admits he "would do anything just to be like him." The song appears on the album Sirocco, named after Flynn's yacht.
- Roman Polanski's 1986 film Pirates was intended to pay homage to the beloved Errol Flynn swashbucklers of his childhood.
- In 2005, a small waterfront reserve in Sandy Bay, a suburb of Flynn's hometown of Hobart, was renamed from Short Beach to the "Errol Flynn Reserve".
- The Pirate's Daughter, a 2008 novel by Margaret Cezair-Thompson, is a fictionalised account of Flynn's later life. The novel's plot plays extensively on Flynn's purported attraction to underaged girls.
- In June 2009 the Errol Flynn Society of Tasmania Inc. organised the Errol Flynn Centenary Celebration, a 10-day series of events designed to celebrate the 100th anniversary of his birth. On the actual centenary, 20 June 2009, his daughter Rory Flynn unveiled a star with his name on the footpath outside Hobart's heritage State Cinema.
- In 2009, the mega-yacht marina in the Jamaican north-eastern coastal town of Port Antonio, where Flynn once owned the 64 acre Navy Island and a 2,000 acre coconut plantation and cattle ranch he bequeathed to his widow, Patrice Wymore, underwent a name change to the Errol Flynn Marina.
- The 2010 novel Errol, Fidel and the Cuban Rebel Girls by Boyd Anderson is a fictionalised account of the last year of Flynn's life in Cuba.
- The character of Flynn Rider from Walt Disney Animation Studios' animated film Tangled (2010) was named after Flynn as an homage and was based on him and Gene Kelly.

== Bibliography ==
- Aadland, Florence. The Big Love. Los Angeles: Spurl Editions, 2018. ISBN 978-1-943679-06-5.
- Beam Ends (1937)
- Showdown (1946)
- Flynn, Errol. My Wicked, Wicked Ways: the Autobiography of Errol Flynn. Intro. by Jeffrey Meyers. New York: Cooper Square Press, 2003. Rpt. of My Wicked, Wicked Ways. New York: G.P. Putnam's sons, 1959; ISBN 978-0-8154-1250-2.
- Flynn, Errol The Quest for an Oscar by James Turiello, BearManor Media, Duncan, Oklahoma. 2012; ISBN 978-1-59393-695-2.
- Bret, David. Errol Flynn: Gentleman Hellraiser (2014) ISBN 978-1-78101-170-6.

== Select radio performances ==
Flynn appeared in numerous radio performances:

Year	Title	Venue	Dates performed
1937	Captain Blood	Lux Radio Theatre	22 February
1937	British Agent	Lux Radio Theatre	7 June
1937	These Three	Lux Radio Theatre	6 December
1938	Green Light	Lux Radio Theatre	31 January
1939	The Perfect Specimen	Lux Radio Theatre	2 January
1939	Lives of a Bengal Lancer	Lux Radio Theatre	10 April
1940	Trade Winds	Lux Radio Theatre	4 March
1941	Virginia City	Lux Radio Theatre	26 May
1941	They Died With Their Boots On	Cavalcade of America	17 November
1944	Command Performance	Armed Forces Radio Network	30 July
1946	Gentleman Jim	Theatre of Romance	5 February
1952	Kim	Lux Radio Theatre	18 February
1952	The Modern Adventures of Casanova	Mutual radio series	39 episodes

== Stage performances ==
Flynn appeared on stage in a number of performances, particularly early in his career:

- The Thirteenth Chair – Dec 1933 – Northampton Rep
- Jack and the Beanstalk – Dec 1933 – Northampton Rep
- Sweet Lavender – January 1934 – Northampton Rep
- Bulldog Drummond – January 1934 – Northampton Rep
- A Doll's House – January 1934 – Northampton Rep
- On the Spot – January 1934 – Northampton Rep
- Pygmalion – January–February 1934 – Northampton Rep
- Crime at Blossoms – February 1934 – Northampton Rep
- Yellow Sands – February 1934 – Northampton Rep
- The Grain of Mustard Seed – February 1934 – Northampton Rep
- Seven Keys to Baldpate – March 1934 – Northampton Rep
- Othello – March 1934 – Northampton Rep
- The Green Bay Tree – March 1934 – Northampton Rep
- The Fake – March 1934 – Northampton Rep
- The Farmer's Wife – March–April 1934 – Northampton Rep
- The Wind and the Rain – April 1934 – Northampton Rep
- Sheppey – April 1934 – Northampton Rep
- The Soul of Nicholas Snyders – April 1934 – Northampton Rep
- The Devil's Disciple – May 1934 – Northampton Rep
- Conflict – May 1934 – Northampton Rep
- Paddy the Next Best Thing – May 1934 – Northampton Rep
- 9:45 – May–June 1934 – Northampton Rep
- Malvern festival – July–August 1934 – appeared in A Man's House, History of Dr Faustus, Marvelous History of Saint Bernard, The Moon in Yellow River, Mutiny
- A Man's House – August – September 1934 – Glasgow, St Martin's Lane
- Master of Thornfield – February 1958 – adaptation of Jane Eyre
