= Cuban Rebel Girls =

- Film poster for Cuban Rebel Girls
- Directed by: Barry Mahon
- Written by: Errol Flynn
- Based on: story by Errol Flynn
- Produced by: Barry Mahon
- Starring: Beverly Aadland; Jackie Jackler; Marie Edmund; Errol Flynn
- Narrated by: Errol Flynn
- Cinematography: Merrill S. Brody
- Edited by: Alan Smiler
- Production company: Exploit Films Inc
- Distributed by: Joseph Brenner Associates
- Release dates: 25 December 1959 (New York); March 1960 (LA)
- Running time: 68 mins
- Country: United States
- Language: English

Cuban Rebel Girls or Assault of the Cuban Rebel Girls is a 1959 semi-dramatic documentary B movie, and the final on-screen performance of Errol Flynn. He stars with his underage girlfriend, Beverly Aadland.

The script was written and narrated by Flynn, who was sympathetic to the Cuban revolution being led by Fidel Castro in its early phase.

In his memoir Flynn called it "an interesting side venture... I spent many days with Fidel just before the Batistans quit."

== Plot ==
Errol Flynn arrives in Cuba on behalf of the Hearst Press to do a series of articles on the revolution of Fidel Castro. He notices some changes in Cuba caused by the rebellion.

He checks into a hotel and is contacted by one of Castro's agents, a female, who takes him to a beach resort. He meets a young man who offers to take Errol behind the lines to meet Castro. Flynn flies in his own plane, meets the rebels, and files several articles, including one of the Cuban Rebel Girls.

The movie then goes into the story of two American girls, Beverly and her friend, Jacqueline, whose brother Johnny (Beverly's boyfriend) is fighting for Castro in Cuba. The two girls decide to visit Cuba.

They take $50,000 raised by American friends of the revolution to be used to buy guns. They visit Key West and then fly to Cuba. They join the revolution with the soldiers of Castros army and go on rebel attacks where Beverly gets with her boyfriend, who is shot on one of the raids and left behind. After being captured the girls reunite with Johnny at the victory parade in Havana and Errol Flynn closes the film with a short speech on the bravery of the rebels.

== Cast ==
- Errol Flynn as Himself
- Beverly Aadland as Beverly Woods
- John McKay as Johnny Wilson
- Jackie Jackler as Jacqueline Dominguez
- Marie Edmund as Maria Rodriguez
- Ben Ostrowsky as Raoul 'Ben' Dominguez
- Reynerio Sanchez
- Andrés Fernández
- Esther Oliva
- Tod Scott Brody
- Allen Baron
- Clelle Mahon
- Ramon Ramierez

== Production notes ==
- Also known as Assault of the Rebel Girls.
- In opening credits: "Our thanks to the New Army of Cuba, whose help in creating this picture was invaluable."
- After making the film, Beverly Aadland got into a brawl with Flynn's second wife, Nora Eddington, at Aadland's birthday party in a night club. Nora later said this was because she took exception to Aadland referring to Flynn as "elderly".

== Release ==
Rights to the movie were bought by Joseph Brenner Associates. Brenner described the film as "an authentic and non political background drama."

=== Critical reception ===
The New York Times said "Flynn and his associates provide little that is entertaining, artistic, or informative in this largely static, jerry-built independently made adventure ... Mr Flynn cannot be blamed for giving the appearance of being very, very tired throughout these phlegmatic proceedings."

The Los Angeles Times said the:

Only interest this picture could possibly have is that is happens to be the last performance by the late Errol Flynn before the movie camera. That, and the fact that it gives the public a chance to see Beverly Aadland for the first time. Both are disappointing ... The storyline is weak and poor direction and editing merely add to the confusion. The remainder of the cast is inconsequential and their acting, if it can be called that, is on a par with the over-all production, which is uniformly bad. It is a sad ending to one of the most flamboyant actors of our times.

FilmInk magazine wrote that the film "compels interest mostly by virtue of showing Aadland in a lead role, Flynn on death's door, and the weirdness of such a pro-Castro film (even though he wasn’t a confirmed commie then) coming from a Hollywood movie star."
