= Lower Arroyo, Pasadena, California =

Californian neighborhood

Coordinates: 34.1407°N 118.1650°W

One of the many stone trails in the Lower Arroyo

The Lower Arroyo is a historic neighborhood in the southwestern quadrant of Pasadena, California, centered on the Arroyo Seco south of Brookside Park and the Colorado Street Bridge (Pasadena, California). It is bordered by Holly Street to the north, Columbia Street to the south, San Rafael Avenue to the west, and Orange Grove Boulevard to the east.

The area along the Arroyo Seco lies within the ancestral lands of the Tongva people, including the Hahamog'na, whose villages extending along the seasonal creek and nearby canyons into present-day South Pasadena. During the Spanish and Mexican periods, the surrounding lands became associated with the Mission San Gabriel, El Molino Viejo, and later Rancho San Pasqual.

In 1874, settlers associated with the Indiana Colony established an agricultural community on former rancho land east of the Arroyo Seco. Organized through the San Gabriel Orange Grove Association, the settlement formed the nucleus of Pasadena. Orange groves, orchards, and vineyards characterized much of western Pasadena during the following decade, with homes set among citrus plantings along Orange Grove Avenue, now Orange Grove Boulevard.

Residential development along the eastern edge of the Lower Arroyo began in the late nineteenth century and expanded during the early twentieth century. The area now compromising of the Lower Arroyo Seco Historic District remained sparsely settled in 1903, serving as a rural setting behind the farmhouses and mansions along South Orange Grove Boulevard. Small residential tracts were recorded between 1904 and 1913, and by 1910 the area contained a substantially greater concentration of one- and two-story homes.

During the early twentieth century, South Grand Avenue developed into one of Pasadena's prominent resident streets, with substantial estates overlooking the Arroyo Seco. Among the notable residences were the Henry Robinson House (1905) the Freeman A. Ford House (1907), and Grand View, the estate of physician and businessman Rudolph Schiffmann, known for its extensive gardens and rare plants. Schiffmann was instrumental in the preservation of the Arroyo Seco, serving as president of the Arroyo Park Association beginning in 1907. In 1909, he purchased and donated a two-and-a-half-acre wooded parcel to the City of Pasadena for public parkland, helping initiate the acquisition and preservation of the Arroyo as a public recreational landscape.

La Loma street architecture

The Arroyo's natural landscape has historically attracted artists, writers, and architects and became the center of Pasadena's Arts and Crafts movement. Houses within the Lower Arroyo Seco Historic District are typically situated further back on their lots, are made of local brick, river rock, tile and typically have sleeping porches to capture the cool, dry evenings along the canyon. Homes by Greene and Greene, Joseph Blick, and Marston, Van Pelt & Maybury can be found throughout. Residents have included Ernest A. Batchelder, Jean Mannheim, Edgar Cheesewright, Paul Sample and Charlie Kaufman.

== Landmarks ==
Lower Arroyo's most notable landmarks include the stone-lined trails and many bridges that span the Arroyo Seco. These famous bridges include: Colorado Street Bridge (Pasadena, California), La Loma Bridge, and San Rafael Bridge (Pasadena).

View of the Colorado street bridge from the Arroyo

The neighborhood also houses the headquarters of the United States 9th Circuit Court of Appeals in the former Vista Del Arroyo hotel location.

La Casita Del Arroyo is a stone community meeting house hugging the eastern edge of the Arroyo, designed by Myron Hunt in 1933.

The area at the floor of the Arroyo Seco, along both sides of the flood control channel (between Arroyo Blvd. on the east and San Rafael Ave. on the west, from the Colorado Street bridge to the South Pasadena border) is known locally as Lower Arroyo Park, and identified as such by a sign posted at the entrance near the intersection of Arroyo and Norwood Street. The City of Pasadena's website identifies it only as "Lower Arroyo Seco." The park, which covers about 150 acres, includes several miles of hiking trails.

Features of the Lower Arroyo:

Fly casting pond and clubhouse

Archery range

Multi-use trails (hiking, dog-walking, jogging)

The Aids Memorial Grove

Bird Sanctuary

== Education ==
Lower Arroyo is served by San Rafael and Cleveland Elementary Schools, Blair Middle School, and Blair High School. Mayfield Senior High School is a private school in the area.

== Transportation ==
Lower Arroyo is served by Metro Local lines 180 and 256; as well as Pasadena ARTS route 70, though none of these routes comes closer than about a mile from the Lower Arroyo.

== Government ==
Lower Arroyo, from Colorado Blvd. to the city's southern border, is contained within District 6, represented by Steve Madison. North of Colorado, the western side is in District 6 and the eastern side is in District 1, represented by Tyron Hampton.
