= San Rafael Bridge (disambiguation) =

The San Rafael Bridge is a bridge in Northern California

San Rafael Bridge may also refer to:

- San Rafael Bridge (Pasadena), in Southern California
- San Rafael Bridge (Utah), in Emery County, Utah
