= Howard Hill =

American archer (1899–1975)

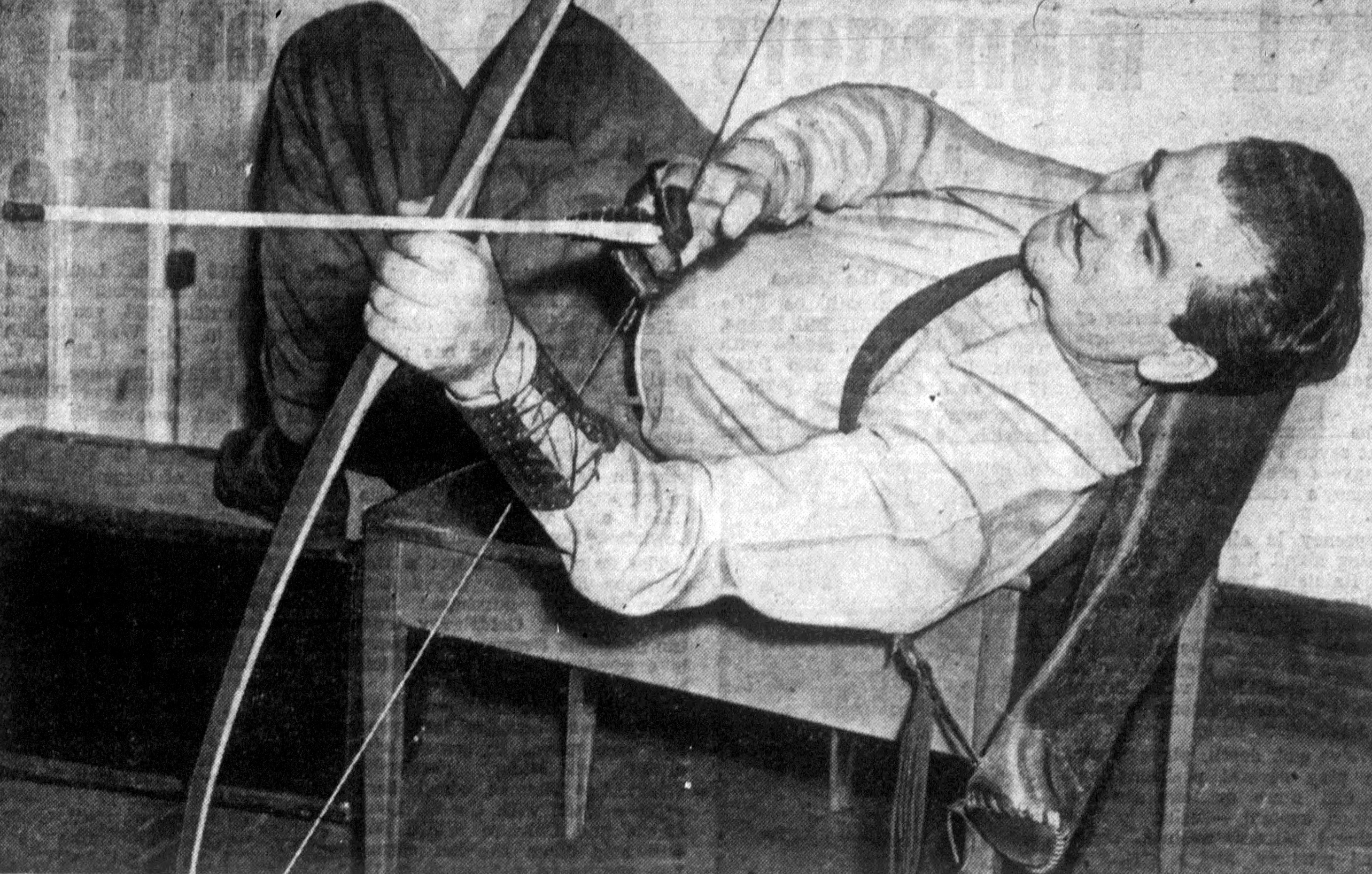
- Hill, circa 1953
- Born: November 13, 1899; Wilsonville, Alabama, U.S.
- Died: February 4, 1975 (aged 75); Birmingham, Alabama, U.S.
- Resting place: New Ashville Cemetery in Ashville, Alabama
- Occupations: Professional Archer, Actor
- Years active: 1928–1952
- Spouse(s): Elizabeth Hill (1922-his death)

Howard Hill (born Lemuel Howard Hill and later cited Howard H. Hill; November 13, 1899 – February 4, 1975) was an expert bowman who for over two decades, from the early 1930s into the 1950s, was often introduced or billed as "The World's Greatest Archer". He established the record for winning the most bow-and-arrow field tournaments in succession, a total of 196 competitions. In addition, Hill served as a supporting actor, trick-shot performer, and technical adviser on archery for Hollywood shorts and feature films. He also produced and directed documentaries and instructional films on bowhunting, and in the 1950s published two books on the subject, Hunting the Hard Way and Wild Adventure.

== Early life and career ==
Lemuel Howard Hill was born in Wilsonville, Alabama, in 1899, the youngest of Mary E. (née Crumpton) and John F. Hill's nine children. Growing up on a cotton farm, Howard learned how to use various tools, along with weapons of all types, including bows and arrows that his father made for him and his four older brothers. He began using a bow at age four and by age six he received his own homemade archery set, which he used for target practice and for hunting in the woods surrounding his family's property. Later, when Howard attended Shelby County High School in nearby Columbiana, he proved to be an exceptional athlete in a variety of other sports, including baseball, basketball, football, and golf. On September 12, 1918, during World War I, he registered for the United States military, but the war ended just two months later, so he never entered the service. On his draft card, he signed his name "Howard H. Hill", indicating that he had altered his full name, adding a middle "H" and dropping his first name Lemuel, as it is documented in the federal census of 1910.

Following his graduation from high school, Hill enrolled at age 19 at Auburn Polytechnic Institute (now Auburn University), where he continued to play baseball, football, and basketball. He completed two years of study at Auburn, paying his tuition and living costs at school with money he earned giving archery lessons during summer vacations. Later, after getting married in 1922, Hill and his wife moved to Florida. There he found employment as a machinist with a division of Hughes Tool Company, and he also played semi-pro baseball on the side. When his interest in a possible career in baseball began to ebb, he considered playing golf professionally; but he returned again to his childhood passion for archery. Hill became a regular competitor in field events for the longbow; and by 1930 he identified himself vocationally as a "manufacturer" of archery equipment or "tackle" in Opa-locka, located just north of Miami. Soon, his growing involvement working in Hollywood films as an archery expert, stuntman, and adviser prompted the Hills to move to Los Angeles, California, where by 1940 they owned a home at 12007 Saticoy Street and Howard identified his full-time occupation then as a performer or "Artist" in motion pictures.

Earlier, in 1937 for Spectrum Pictures, Hill had performed in the Western The Singing Buckaroo, portraying the character Maneeto, a Native American friend of the film's star, Fred Scott. The next year he exhibited his expertise with the bow in Follow the Arrow, a short film that includes a skeet-shooting contest between Hill and a marksman armed with a shotgun. In 1938 he also performed all the bow-and-arrow stunts for Errol Flynn's Technicolor "swashbuckler" The Adventures of Robin Hood, as well as portraying "Owain the Welshman" at the archery tournament, followed by additional stunts and trick shots for other films starring Flynn, including The Private Lives of Elizabeth and Essex, Dodge City, and Virginia City.

== Achievements and honors ==
Among his many achievements in archery, Howard Hill in 1928 set a new world record for the farthest recorded flight shot with a bow and arrow, at 391 yards (358 m). That same year, he won his 196th field archery competition in a row. Hill, though, was not only one of the most decorated archers in the modern era of target shooting, hunting, and flight archery competitions, he was also a celebrated writer and producer. During his career, he produced 23 films about archery for Warner Bros. He also produced 10 different films of his own and was a technical adviser in far more motion pictures, providing his expertise in the field. As a bowhunter himself, he killed over 2,000 animals with his longbow, including a 10,000-pound African bull elephant, becoming the first white man to kill such an animal with an arrow. To accomplish that feat he used a 41-inch-long (100 cm) arrow while pulling a 115-pound bow.

Numerous local, state, and national organizations devoted to the sport of archery have honored Hill. He was inducted into the Alabama Sports Hall of Fame in Birmingham in 1971, the Archery Hall of Fame in Springfield, Missouri, in 1972; and into the Bowhunters Hall of Fame in Squaw Valley, California, in 1975. His remarkable achievements have been highly regarded internationally as well as in the United States. In Canada, for example, Archery Toronto currently recognizes Hill as "one of the three greatest archers of the last century", the other two being, in that organization's estimation, the legendary Japanese Zen bowman Awa Kenzō and Byron Ferguson, a native of Alabama like Hill.

== Performing ==
Hill enjoyed the challenge of making remarkably difficult trick shots, such as shooting an apple or prune off the top of someone's head from a distance of 60 feet. After accomplishing that, he would perform the same bow-and-arrow stunt with an even smaller item from a greater distance. He produced several short documentaries that highlighted other difficult trick shots. Some others included hitting a small coin flipped into the air and splitting a wooden ball in half while it was rolled across the ground. He would also perform difficult shots standing on one leg or while lying on the ground and holding the bow with his feet.

Beyond Hill's ability at trick shooting and hitting stationary targets, he demonstrated skills hunting wild game, especially with his traditional longbow. Some of his hunting trips were filmed or documented, including Howard Hill vs. Lion and Howard Hill vs. Elephant. The marksmanship that Hill exhibits in just those two films exemplify why many archers consider him to be among the greatest hunters of all time.

== Partial filmography ==
=== Acting ===
Howard Hill in The Adventures of Robin Hood (1938)

==== Feature films and documentaries ====
- The Last Wilderness (1935) – Himself
- The Singing Buckaroo (1937) – Maneeto – Grant's Indian Friend
- The Adventures of Robin Hood (1938) – Elwyn the Welshman (credited as "Captain of Archers")
- San Antonio (1945) – Henchman (uncredited) (final film role)
- Tembo (1951, Documentary) – Himself
- Deep Sea Fishing (1952, Short documentary) – Himself

==== Short subjects (Warner Bros.) ====
- Sword Fishing (October 21, 1939) "Bow & Arrow Adventures"
- Wild Boar Hunt (January 21, 1940) "Bow & Arrow Adventures"
- Shark Hunting (November 9, 1940) "Bow & Arrow Adventures"
- Hunting the Hard Way (May 17, 1941) "Bow & Arrow Adventures"
- Points on Arrows (December 27, 1941) "Hollywood Novelties"
- King of the Archers (February 6, 1943) "Hollywood Novelties"
- The Man Killers (May 29, 1943) "Broadway Brevities" (20 minutes)
- Hunting the Devil Cat (December 18, 1943) "Hollywood Novelties"
- Filipino Sports Parade (June 17, 1944) Technicolor "Sports Parade"
- Outdoor Living (November 4, 1944) "Warner / Vitaphone Novelties"
- Champions of the Future (November 18, 1944) Technicolor "Sports Parade"
- Cavalcade of Archery (January 12, 1946) Technicolor "Sports Parade"
- The Lazy Hunter (October 26, 1946) Technicolor "Sports Parade"
- Battle of the Champs (January 18, 1947) Technicolor "Sports Parade"
- Art of Archery (October 6, 1951) Technicolor "Sports Parade"
- Cruise of the Zaca (December 6, 1952) "Technicolor Special" (20 minutes, filmed 1946–47)

=== Technical adviser and archery instructor ===
- Across the Wide Missouri (1951)
- The Bandit of Sherwood Forest (1946)
- Buffalo Bill (1944)
- The Adventures of Robin Hood (1938)

=== “Splitting-the-arrow” shot ===
While performing in the role of an archer in The Adventures of Robin Hood (starring Errol Flynn), Hill made perhaps the most iconic bow-and-arrow shot in American film history: Robin Hood shooting his own arrow to split a competitor's arrow already embedded in a distant target. In 2006, cast members of the Australian-American television series MythBusters were unable to replicate the end-to-end splitting of an arrow, so they concluded that Hill probably used a shaft made of bamboo, not wood, for the famous shot.

Split arrow from The Adventures of Robin Hood (1938)

Byron Ferguson, a renowned bowhunter himself and a trick-shot expert, was able to perfectly split an arrow lengthwise using a modern laminated longbow, a shot that was filmed for the television special Extreme Marksmen and broadcast on the History Channel in 2008. Byron Ferguson, however, did not split a wooden arrow but telescoped a modern aluminum arrow into another. The aluminum and carbon-fiber arrow shafts used by modern archers are more consistent and straighter than wood arrows, making for more consistent shots. That makes Hill's feat truly impressive since he used only cedar wood arrows. Hill had designed and used specially made aluminum shafts to hunt African elephants for his full-length color film Tembo (1951).

The splitting-the-arrow scene in The Adventures of Robin Hood is explained by Hollywood stuntman Buster Wiles in his 1988 book My Days With Errol Flynn. In it Wiles reveals that although Hill had split the end off of several arrows, he was unable to split the arrow exactly as scripted (from end-to-end). Finally, a specially constructed arrow with a large bladed head was used and shot at the target arrow along a concealed wire. Nevertheless, Hill's accuracy was otherwise so precise that he routinely hit extremely small targets in both live and filmed demonstrations.

== You Bet Your Life ==
On February 17, 1955, Hill appeared as a contestant on You Bet Your Life, a popular American quiz series hosted on both radio and television by comedian Groucho Marx. In that televised broadcast, Hill describes the most challenging trick shot he ever performed and also briefly discusses his experiences hunting elephants with a bow and arrow. He and his game partner then attempt to win the show's grand-prize of $1,500; but they lose, failing to answer correctly a question relating to the Battle of Hastings. Ironically, considering Hill's profession, archers played a pivotal role in that battle, which occurred in England in 1066. According to some historical accounts, the Anglo-Saxon king, Harold II, died in the fighting after being "struck in the eye" by a Norman arrow.

== Personal life and death ==
On October 31, 1922, he married Elizabeth Hodges, a native of Ashville, Alabama, who was his former high-school English teacher. They remained together for 53 years, until Howard's death at age 75 in February 1975. His gravesite is located in the Ashville Cemetery in St. Clair County, Alabama.

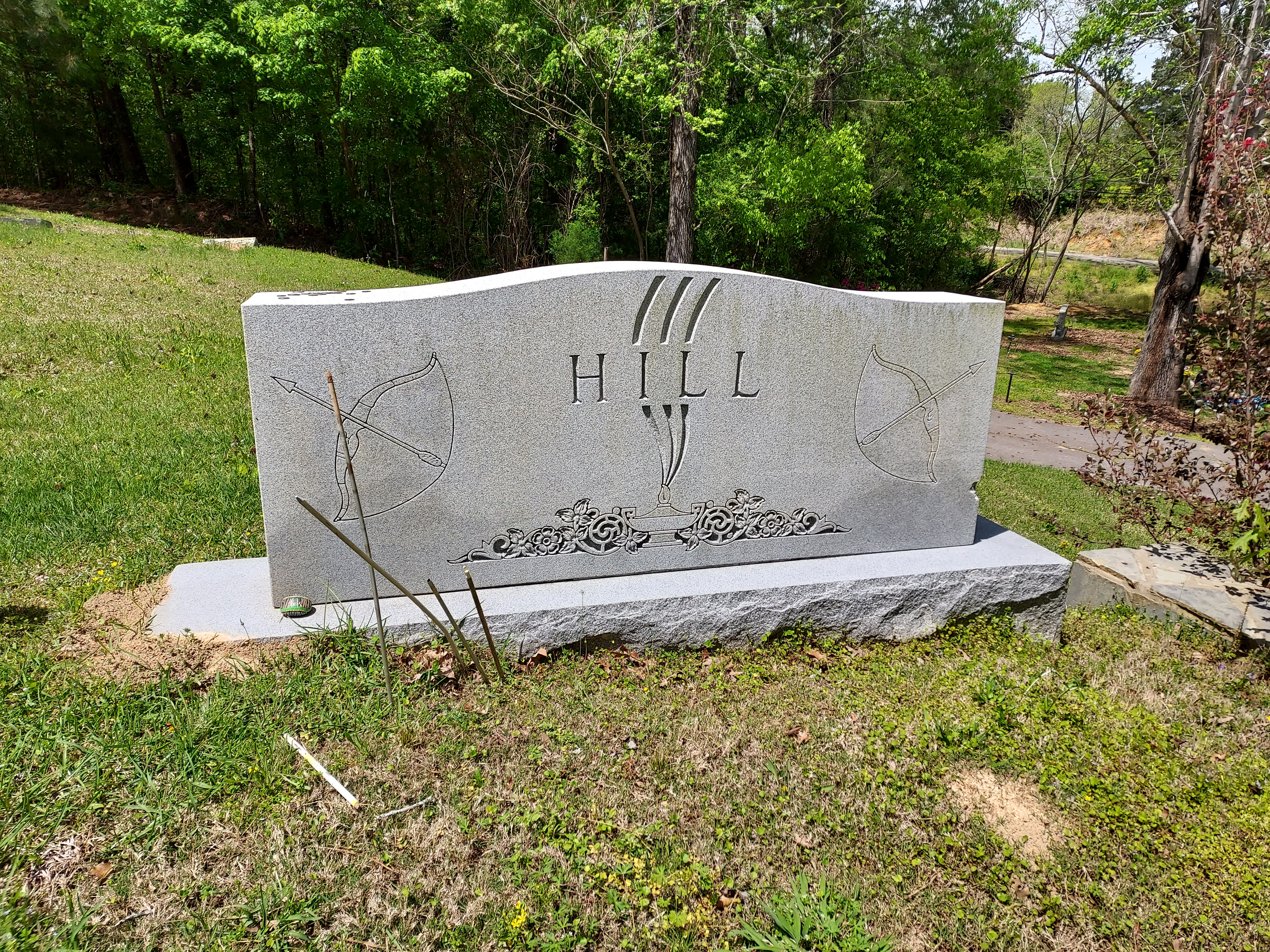
Gravesite of Howard Hill, located in Ashville, Alabama
