= Thomas Pratt (film editor) =

American film editor (1898–1973)

- Born: November 8, 1898; Santa Barbara, California, U.S.
- Died: August 4, 1973 (aged 74); Netherlands
- Occupation: Film editor

Thomas Pratt (November 8, 1898 – August 4, 1973) was an American film editor.

== Biography ==
Born in Santa Barbara, California, Pratt was active as an editor from 1928 through 1959, apparently exclusively for Warner Brothers. His films include:

== Filmography ==
- Sensation Seekers (1927)
- The Terror (1928)
- Glorious Betsy (1928)
- On Trial (1928)
- Hearts in Exile (1929)
- The Redeeming Sin (1929)
- The Gamblers (1929)
- Tiger Shark (1932)
- The Crowd Roars (1932)
- 42nd Street (1933)
- Elmer, the Great (1933)
- Wild Boys of the Road (1933)
- Lawyer Man (1933)
- Mandalay (1934)
- Murder in the Clouds (1934)
- Desirable (1934)
- Alibi Ike (1935)
- The Widow from Monte Carlo (1935)
- The Florentine Dagger (1935)
- The Golden Arrow (1936)
- The Walking Dead (1936)
- The Return of Doctor X (1939)
- Shadows on the Stairs (1941)
- The Hard Way (1943)
- Tembo (1952)
- Miss Robin Crusoe (1953)
- Loves of Three Queens (1954)
- Jet Over the Atlantic (1959)
