= The Adventures of Robin Hood =

1938 film by Michael Curtiz and William Keighley

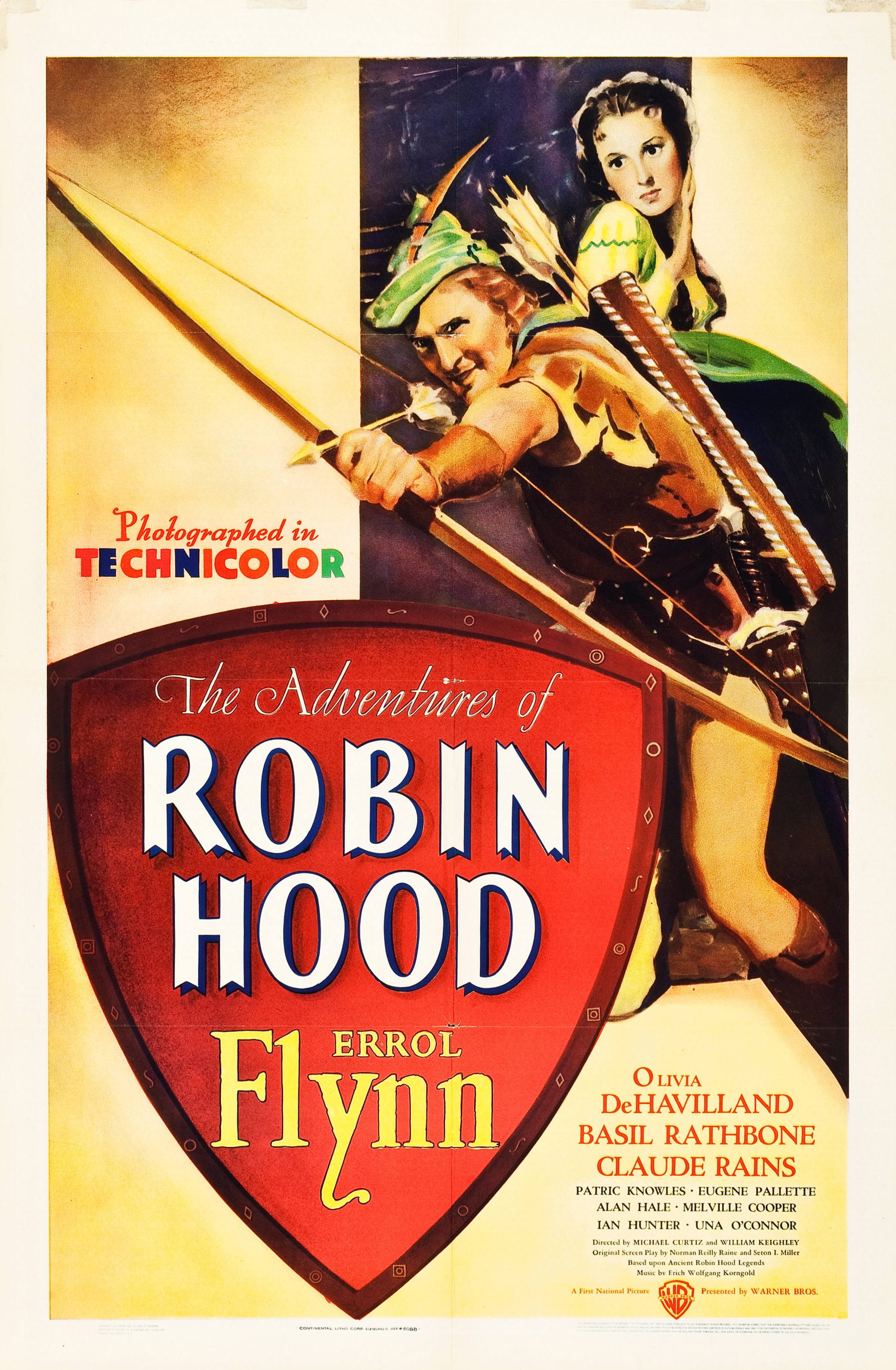
- Theatrical release poster, by Alex Raymond
- Directed by: Michael Curtiz; William Keighley
- Screenplay by: Norman Reilly Raine; Seton I. Miller
- Produced by: Hal B. Wallis; Henry Blanke
- Starring: Errol Flynn; Olivia de Havilland; Basil Rathbone; Claude Rains
- Cinematography: Tony Gaudio; Sol Polito; W. Howard Greene
- Edited by: Ralph Dawson
- Music by: Erich Wolfgang Korngold
- Color process: Technicolor
- Production company: Warner Bros. Pictures
- Distributed by: Warner Bros. Pictures
- Release dates: May 12, 1938 (limited release); May 13, 1938 (Philadelphia); May 14, 1938 (New York City)
- Running time: 102 minutes
- Country: United States
- Language: English
- Budget: $2,033,000
- Box office: $3,981,000

The Adventures of Robin Hood is a 1938 American epic swashbuckler film from Warner Bros. Pictures. It was produced by Hal B. Wallis and Henry Blanke, directed by Michael Curtiz and William Keighley, and written by Norman Reilly Raine and Seton I. Miller.

It stars Errol Flynn as the legendary Saxon knight Robin Hood, who in Richard I's absence in the Holy Land during the Crusades, fights back as the outlaw leader of a rebel guerrilla band against Prince John and the Norman lords oppressing the Saxon commoners. The cast also includes Olivia de Havilland, Basil Rathbone, Claude Rains, Patric Knowles, Eugene Pallette, and Alan Hale.

Upon its premiere on May 12, 1938, The Adventures of Robin Hood was very well received by critics. The film was a commercial success; it grossed around $4 million at the box office, making it one of the highest grossers of 1938.

At the 11th Academy Awards, the film received four nominations, winning three—Best Art Direction (Carl Jules Weyl), Best Film Editing (Ralph Dawson) and Best Original Score (Erich Wolfgang Korngold). In 1995, The Adventures of Robin Hood was deemed "culturally, historically, or aesthetically significant" by the Library of Congress and selected for preservation by the National Film Registry.

== Plot ==
Richard, the Norman King of England, is taken captive in 1191 by Duke Leopold while returning from the Third Crusade. Richard's treacherous brother Prince John, aided by fellow Norman Sir Guy of Gisbourne, names himself regent of England, increasing the Saxons' taxes under the pretense of gathering a ransom for Richard.

The Normans exploit and oppress the Saxons. Sir Robin of Locksley, a Saxon noble, opposes the brutality and rescues Much the Miller's Son from being executed for poaching, earning Gisbourne's ire. Robin later confronts Prince John at a Nottingham Castle banquet, telling the guests that he regards John declaring himself regent as treason. John orders Robin's execution, but Robin escapes and flees with Much and Will Scarlet into Sherwood Forest. John seizes Robin's lands and names him an outlaw.

Much is sent to recruit men to join their band. Robin and Will encounter John the Little on a log bridge, and after a quarterstaff contest, welcome him into their ranks. Dozens more men join Robin's band, swearing an oath to despoil the rich while aiding the poor, to fight injustice, and to show courtesy to all oppressed. They start a war against John and Gisbourne, dispatching those who abuse their power.

Robin's band encounters the rotund Friar Tuck, a renowned swordsman who joins the band and assists in capturing a company of Normans transporting a shipment of gathered taxes. In the company are Gisbourne, the cowardly Sheriff of Nottingham, and King Richard's ward Lady Marian. After their capture, the men are humiliated at a celebratory woodland banquet, with Marian given a seat of honor. Initially scornful, she comes to share Robin's views after he shows her examples of Norman brutality against the Saxons. Robin sends the convoy back to Nottingham Castle, telling them that they have Marian's presence to thank for their lives being spared.

Having noted Robin's focus on Marian during the Sherwood banquet, the sheriff suggests hosting an archery tournament, with Marian presenting a golden arrow as the prize to entrap Robin. Robin enters the tournament in disguise, is recognized by his archery skill, and is captured and sentenced to be hanged. Marian aids Robin's Men in a scheme to save him. After his escape, he scales the palace walls to thank her, and the two pledge their love for one another. Marian declines Robin's marriage proposal, remaining in the castle as a spy.

King Richard returns with several of his knights. The Bishop of the Black Canons sees through Richard's disguise and alerts John. John sends disgraced former knight Dickon Malbete to kill Richard, promising Dickon Robin's title and lands. Marian overhears and writes to Robin but is found out by Gisbourne and sentenced to death. Her nursemaid, Bess, tells Much everything. He intercepts Dickon and kills him after a fight.

Richard and his men, disguised as Norman monks, travel through Sherwood and are stopped by Robin. Assuring Robin they are on the king's business, Richard accepts Robin's offer of hospitality and his condemnation of the Holy Crusade but does not reveal his identity.

Much relays Bess' news. Robin orders his men to find and protect Richard; now certain of Robin's loyalty, Richard reveals himself. Robin coerces the Bishop of the Black Canons to allow them to join his monks in disguise so they can enter Nottingham Castle. Once inside, Richard announces his presence, and a melee erupts. Robin kills Gisbourne after a lengthy duel, frees Marian, and prompts John's men to surrender.

Returned to his throne, Richard banishes John, the Sheriff, and the Bishop from England. He restores Robin's rank, raising him to Baron of Locksley and Earl of Sherwood and Nottingham. The king also pardons Robin's men and commands Robin to take the hand of the Lady Marian in marriage.

== Cast ==
- Errol Flynn as Robin Hood
- Olivia de Havilland as Maid Marian
- Basil Rathbone as Guy of Gisbourne
- Claude Rains as Prince John
- Patric Knowles as Will Scarlet
- Eugene Pallette as Friar Tuck
- Alan Hale, Sr. as Little John
- Melville Cooper as the Sheriff of Nottingham
- Ian Hunter as King Richard the Lion-Heart
- Una O'Connor as Bess
- Herbert Mundin as Much
- Montagu Love as the Bishop of the Black Canons
- Leonard Willey as Sir Essex
- Robert Noble as Sir Ralf
- Kenneth Hunter as Sir Mortimer
- Robert Warwick as Sir Geoffrey
- Colin Kenny as Sir Baldwin
- Lester Matthews as Sir Ivor
- Harry Cording as Dickon Malbete
- Howard Hill as Captain of Archers (also Elwyn the Welshman [uncredited])
- Ivan F. Simpson as Proprietor of Kent Road Tavern

Uncredited:

- Lionel Belmore as Humility Prin (proprietor of Saracens Head Tavern)
- Charles Bennett as Peddler at Tournament
- Frank Hagney as Man-at-arms
- Holmes Herbert as Archery Referee
- Crauford Kent as Sir Norbett
- Carole Landis as Guest at Banquet
- Leonard Mudie as Town Crier
- Val Stanton as Outlaw
- Ernie Stanton as Outlaw
- Reginald Sheffield as Herald at Archery Tournament
- Trigger as Lady Marian's horse (Note: Roy Rogers admired the then-named Golden Cloud so much that he bought Trigger to use in his own films. This eventually made Trigger one of the most famous animals in show business.)

== Production ==
The Adventures of Robin Hood was produced at an estimated cost of $2 million, one of the more expensive film Warner Bros. Pictures had made up to that time. It was also the studio's third film made in the full three-strip Technicolor process, after God's Country and the Woman and Gold Is Where You Find It. The film was, in fact, planned to be shot in black and white for most of its development; the switch to Technicolor happened just three months before production started. It was an unusually extravagant production for the Warner Bros. studio, which was known in the 1930s for socially conscious crime films. Filming began on September 26, 1937, and concluded on January 14, 1938.

Producer Hal B. Wallis is generally supposed to have been the film's creative helmsman. The first draft of the script was written by Rowland Lee, but Wallis objected to its heavily archaic and fanciful dialogue (one line he cited was "Oh my lord, tarry not too long, for I fear that in her remorse she may fling herself from the window. Some harm may befall her, I know."). At Wallis's insistence, the script was heavily rewritten to modernize the dialogue, and whether any of Lee's work survives in the completed film is unclear.

The scene in which Robin Hood first meets Prince John, Guy of Gisbourne, and Maid Marian went through several iterations. Initially, the scene was to be at a jousting tournament with Robin tilting against Guy of Gisbourne, mimicking the 1922 Douglas Fairbanks production of Robin Hood, but screenwriter Norman Reilly Raine pointed out that a banquet scene would be much less expensive to produce, and so long as Technicolor was employed would look just as lavish to the average moviegoer. In another draft, instead of a deer, a slain villager was who Robin Hood brought in and dumped on Prince John's table. Wallis felt the use of a dead villager expended all the tension of the scene in "a momentary kick" and preferred the use of a deer from an earlier draft, which allowed the tension to simmer with the threat of an explosion at any moment. During the brawl where Robin escapes from the banquet hall, Basil Rathbone was trampled by an extra whose spear cut his foot badly, requiring eight stitches to close the wound.

James Cagney was originally cast as Robin Hood but walked out on his Warner Bros. contract, paving the way for the role to go to Errol Flynn. The filming was postponed three years as a result. Though Olivia de Havilland was an early frontrunner for the role of Maid Marian, for a time the studio vacillated between Anita Louise and her for the part. De Havilland was ultimately chosen because the success of Captain Blood established the pairing of Flynn and de Havilland as a safe bet to help ensure box-office success.

Location work for The Adventures of Robin Hood included Bidwell Park in Chico, California, which substituted for Sherwood Forest, although one major scene was filmed at the California locations "Lake Sherwood" and "Sherwood Forest", so named because they were the location sites for the Fairbanks production of Robin Hood. Several scenes were shot at the Warner Bros. Burbank Studios and the Warner Ranch in Calabasas. The archery tournament was filmed at the former Busch Gardens, now part of Lower Arroyo Park, in Pasadena.

Scenes which were filmed but not included in the final cut include the disguised King Richard brawling with Friar Tuck, and Robin riding off with Maid Marian; the latter would have been the concluding scene of the film and appears in the theatrical trailer despite not appearing in the film itself.

=== Stunts ===
All the arrows in the film were shot by professional archer Howard Hill. Those actors shot with arrows wore clothing padded with balsa wood on protective metal plates that prevented injury, though impact was fairly painful and the arrows lodged into the balsa wood to create the illusion of bodily penetration. Although listed as the archer captain defeated by Robin, Hill was cast as Elwyn the Welshman, an archer seen shooting at Robin in his escape from Nottingham Castle and later defeated by Robin at the archery tournament. To win, Robin splits the arrow of Philip of Arras, a captain of the guard under Gisbourne, who had struck the bullseye. Hill did in fact split one arrow with another during filming (albeit while loosing from a much closer range than that from which Robin Hood is portrayed as shooting). However, the resulting footage did not look good enough on film, so the shot was redone with some effects trickery. Stuntman Buster Wiles, a close friend of Errol Flynn's and his frequent on-set stand-in, maintained that the arrow-splitting stunt was carried out using an extra-large arrow (for the target) and that the second arrow had a wide, flat arrowhead and was loosed along a wire. This wire is briefly visible attached to the fletching of the arrow in the final film. Wiles discusses the scene in his autobiography, My Days with Errol Flynn.

Flynn performed most of his own stunts in the film; exceptions include Robin jumping onto a horse with hands tied behind his back during the hanging scene, scaling the fortress gate and coming down the other side, and a few select shots in the duel between Robin and Guy of Gisbourne.

=== Music score ===
In 1938, Erich Wolfgang Korngold was conducting opera in Austria when he was asked by Warner Bros. to return to Hollywood and compose a score for The Adventures of Robin Hood. Music historian Laurence E. MacDonald notes that many factors made the film a success, including its cast, its Technicolor photography, and fast-paced direction by Michael Curtiz, but "most of all, there is Korngold's glorious music". Also, film historian Rudy Behlmer describes Korngold's contribution to this and his other films:

Korngold's score was a splendid added dimension. His style for the Flynn swashbucklers resembled that of the creators of late 19th-century and early 20th-century German symphonic tone poems. It incorporated chromatic harmonies, lush instrumental effects, passionate climaxes—all performed in a generally romantic manner. Korngold's original and distinctive style was influenced by the Wagnerian leitmotif, the orchestral virtuosity of Richard Strauss, the delicacy and broad melodic sweep of Puccini, and the long-line development of Gustav Mahler.

In reply to Warner Bros.’ request, Korngold told studio head of production Hal B. Wallis that he was a composer of drama and the heart and felt little connection to what he perceived as "a 90% action picture." Wallis was persistent, and Korngold finally agreed to begin composing on the condition that he not have a contract and work on a week-by-week basis so that he could withdraw if he were dissatisfied with the music he composed. However, Korngold later admitted that the real reason he changed his mind was Adolf Hitler's November 1937 meeting with Austrian ministers, which convinced Korngold that the situation was no longer safe in his home country. As Korngold feared, Austria was annexed by the Nazis, and his home in Vienna was confiscated. This meant that all Jews in Austria were then at risk, so Korngold stayed in the USA until the end of World War II.

Korngold called his film scores "Opern ohne Singen", operas without singing, but otherwise approached their composition just as he would for the operatic stage. The Adventures of Robin Hood was therefore a large-scale symphonic work, and despite the studio music department's providing a team of orchestrators, including future Oscar-winner Hugo Friedhofer, to assist Korngold, the amount of work was immense, especially for the limited time he was given to compose. Erich described this dilemma to his father Julius Korngold, one of Vienna's foremost music critics, and the elder Korngold suggested that themes from his 1920 symphonic overture "Sursum Corda" ("Lift Up Your Hearts") would serve splendidly for much of the most demanding action-scene music, and Erich agreed.

It also won for Korngold his second Academy Award for Best Original Score and established the symphonic style that was later used in action films during Hollywood's Golden Age. Modern-day epics such as the Star Wars and Indiana Jones trilogies similarly included original symphonic scores. Composer John Williams has cited Korngold as his inspiration in scoring the Star Wars series. The love theme of Robin and Marian went on to become a celebrated concert piece.

== Reception ==
Contemporary reviews were highly positive. "A richly produced, bravely bedecked, romantic and colorful show, it leaps boldly to the forefront of this year's best", wrote Frank S. Nugent of The New York Times. The movie premiered at the Radio City Music Hall. "It is cinematic pageantry at its best", raved Variety. "A highly imaginative retelling of folklore in all the hues of Technicolor, deserving handsome box office returns". Film Daily called it "high class entertainment" with "excellent direction" and an "ideal choice" in the casting of Flynn. "Excellent entertainment!" wrote Harrison's Reports. "Adventure, romance, comedy, and human appeal have been skilfully blended to give satisfaction on all counts ... The duel in the closing scenes between the hero and his arch enemy is the most exciting ever filmed". John Mosher of The New Yorker called it "a rich, showy, and, for all its tussles, somewhat stolid affair", praising Flynn's performance and the action sequences but finding the "excellent collection" of supporting actors to be "somewhat buried under the medieval panoply".

Review aggregator website Rotten Tomatoes reports that 100% of critics gave the film a positive rating based on 47 reviews, with an average score of 9.4/10. The film is 13th on their list of the 100 best classic films. Rotten Tomatoes summarizes the critical consensus as, "Errol Flynn thrills as the legendary title character, and the film embodies the type of imaginative family adventure tailor-made for the silver screen". At Metacritic, which assigns a normalized rating to reviews, the film received a score of 97 out of 100, based on 5 reviews, indicating "universal acclaim".

=== Box office ===
Re-release trailer

The Adventures of Robin Hood became the sixth-highest-grossing film of the year, with just over $4 million in revenues at a time when the average ticket price was less than 25 cents.

According to Warner Bros records, the film earned $1,928,000 domestically and $2,053,000 overseas.

In 1938, The Adventures of Robin Hood was the eighth-highest-grossing film nationally in the U.S., and the highest-grossing film the same year in the southern states of Kentucky, Tennessee, West Virginia, Alabama, Mississippi, and Arkansas.

Warner Bros. was so pleased with the results that the studio cast Flynn in two more color epics before the end of the decade: Dodge City and The Private Lives of Elizabeth and Essex.

A sequel, Sir Robin of Locksley, was announced, but never developed.

=== Awards and nominations ===
Award	Category	Nominee(s)	Result
Academy Awards	Outstanding Production	Warner Bros. (Hal B. Wallis and Henry Blanke)	Nominated
Academy Awards	Best Art Direction	Carl Jules Weyl	Won
Academy Awards	Best Film Editing	Ralph Dawson	Won
Academy Awards	Best Original Score	Erich Wolfgang Korngold	Won
DVD Exclusive Awards	Best Deleted Scenes, Outtakes and Bloopers	Michael Crawford and Jeff Kurtti	Nominated
National Film Preservation Board	National Film Registry		Inducted
Online Film & Television Association Awards	Hall of Fame – Motion Picture		Inducted
Saturn Awards	Best DVD Classic Film Release		Won

Other honors:

- In 2001 the film came in at #84 on "The Best Films of All Time" as voted on Channel 4.
- In 2001 the film appeared at #100 on AFI's 100 Years... 100 Thrills list.
- In 2003 the main character, Robin Hood, appeared as the #18 Hero on AFI's 100 Years... 100 Heroes and Villains list.
- In 2005 the film appeared at #11 on AFI's 100 Years of Film Scores list.

== Legacy ==
The film's popularity inextricably linked Errol Flynn's name and image with that of Robin Hood in the public eye, even more so than those of Douglas Fairbanks, who had played the role in 1922. The film became a benchmark for later movie adaptations of Robin Hood.

This was the third film to pair Flynn and Olivia de Havilland (after Captain Blood and The Charge of the Light Brigade). They would ultimately star together in nine films, the aforementioned and Four's a Crowd (1938), The Private Lives of Elizabeth and Essex (1939), Dodge City (1939), Santa Fe Trail (1940), They Died with Their Boots On (1941) and Thank Your Lucky Stars (1943), although they shared no scenes in the last film.

Scenes and costumes worn by the characters have been imitated and spoofed endlessly. For instance, in the 1949 Bugs Bunny animated short film, Rabbit Hood, Bugs is continually told by a dim-witted Little John, "Don't you worry, never fear; Robin Hood will soon be here." When Bugs finally meets Robin at the end of the film, he is stunned to find that it is Errol Flynn, in a spliced-in clip from this film (he subsequently shakes his head and declares, "It couldn't be him!"). Other parodies were Daffy Duck and Porky Pig in Robin Hood Daffy (1958) and Goofy and Black Pete in Goof Troop episode "Goofin' Hood & His Melancholy Men" (1992).

The cat-and-mouse cartoon duo Tom and Jerry have twice taken on the Robin Hood legend, first in the 1958 short Robin Hoodwinked, which implies heavily that its events take place during the Flynn movie, and again in the 2012 animated feature Robin Hood and His Merry Mouse.

The Court Jester, a musical comedy starring Danny Kaye, is in great measure a spoof of Robin Hood. Basil Rathbone even appears as the villain and has a climactic sword fight with Kaye.

In 1982, comedian and impressionist Rich Little played all the major roles in the aptly-titled television special Rich Little's Robin Hood, portraying Groucho Marx as Robin, Carol Channing as Marian, Humphrey Bogart as Prince John, John Wayne as Little John, and many others. Many features of the Flynn film were lampooned, including the stairway sword fight between Robin and Sir Guy (Little imitating Peter Sellers as Inspector Jacques Clouseau). When the pair execute a maneuver twice, Robin asks, "Didn't we do this just now?" to which Guy replies, "Yes, but we did not get it right!"

The Zany Adventures of Robin Hood, a 1984 telefilm starring George Segal as the outlaw and Morgan Fairchild as Maid Marian, borrows heavily from the Flynn film and spoofs many sequences including the banquet which Robin Hood crashes... disguised as a woman. In one scene, a villager mistakes Robin for Ivanhoe. When Robin tells her, "I'm Robin Hood," one of the Sheriff's soldiers mutters to himself, "I thought Errol Flynn was Robin Hood." The looks of many of the characters closely match the originals, primarily the villainous triumvirate of Roddy McDowall as Prince John, Tom Baker as Sir Guy, and Neil Hallett as the Sheriff.

Most of the 1993 Mel Brooks parody Robin Hood: Men in Tights relied on this film for its aesthetics, although the plot was almost completely a riff on Robin Hood: Prince of Thieves, as well as referencing the 1973 Disney version. Mel Brooks also spoofed the Robin Hood legend in his 1975 television series When Things Were Rotten.

Actor Matthew Poretta, who played Will Scarlet in Brooks's film, went on to play Robin himself in the first two seasons of the television series The New Adventures of Robin Hood, one episode of which featured Robin and his team visiting a Robin Hood festival. One of the contestants in a Robin Hood lookalike contest was dressed to look like Flynn, prompting Robin to wonder just who the contestant was supposed to be.

A fragment of one of the film's sword fighting scenes was converted to sprites by Jordan Mechner and used for his 1989 platform game Prince of Persia.

Errol Flynn's acrobatic swordplay became a crucial touchstone for the light-saber duels choreography in Star Wars movies.

In Disney’s 2010 animated film Tangled, the appearance and personality of Flynn Rider are partly inspired by that of Errol Flynn, with his surname also being used in homage.

In 2025, The Hollywood Reporter listed The Adventures of Robin Hood as having the best stunts of 1938.

== Comic and storybook adaptations ==
Knockout Comic (weekly picture paper, Amalgamated Press, London) No 434, June 21, 1947 – No 447, September 20, 1947, 14 issues, 28pp in black-and-white and drawn by Michael Hubbard) Produced when the film was first revived after World War II, with several deviations made from the film's plot, the comic strip's storyline is generally faithful to the look and narrative of the Warner Bros.' film. However, the famous climactic duel between Robin and Sir Guy is reduced to a couple of strip panels, with Robin remaining dressed in his earlier monk's habit. The strip opens with a joust between Robin and Sir Guy, a scene which was in the original screenplay, but was never actually filmed.

== See also ==
- List of films and television series featuring Robin Hood
- List of films with a 100% rating on Rotten Tomatoes, a film review aggregator website
