= My Days with Errol Flynn =

Autobiographical book by Buster Wiles

- Author: Vernon Wiles
- Genre: Autobiography
- Publication date: 1988
- ISBN: 9780915677368

My Days With Errol Flynn is an autobiography of Vernon "Buster" Wiles that focuses predominantly on the times he spent with actor Errol Flynn in Hollywood during the late 1930s and 1940s. The book, which was first published in 1988, was co-written by Wiles and professional writer William Donati. Both men were lifelong advocates of Flynn and his legacy, taking time to denounce the actor's critics in person and in print. Wiles and Donati were especially critical of the controversial author and "celebrity biographer" Charles Higham, and My Days With Errol Flynn contains a section devoted to destroying Higham's allegations against Flynn.

== Synopsis ==
Buster Wiles was a stuntman and screen double during this period, working on a number of Flynn's most popular films, such as The Charge Of The Light Brigade (1936). In his book Wiles recounts numerous escapades he had with Flynn during Hollywood's "Golden Age", and he provides behind-the-scenes insight into the productions he made with the legendary actor. One of those scenes is an iconic one in American film history and also involves Howard Hill, who by the late 1930s was widely regarded as "The World's Greatest Archer". Wiles in the book explains how the famous "splitting-the-arrow" scene in Flynn's "swashbucker" The Adventures of Robin Hood (1938) was accomplished.

Although Wiles documented his numerous exploits with Flynn and wrote an entire book about the actor, Flynn did not include a single sentence about Buster in his own autobiography My Wicked, Wicked Ways. Similarly, Wiles makes no mention of many of Flynn's other friends including his housemate David Niven, an omission that Niven reciprocates in his own books The Moon's a Balloon and Bring On The Empty Horses.

The book also contains a number of unique pictures of Flynn's residence on Mulholland Drive shortly before its demolition in the late 1980s.

== Reviews ==
The book was positively reviewed and a paperback edition remains in print. It is popular with Flynn aficionados still and provides insight into the Star System for anyone interested in the Golden Age Of Hollywood.

== Buster Wiles ==
Vernon "Buster" Wiles was born in Missouri, raised in Tennessee, and worked in Hollywood as a stuntman and double for some twenty years. Prior to this, Buster had a semi itinerant lifestyle and worked as a newsboy, boxer and a caddy prior to his success in Hollywood. He was a lifelong sports fan, especially enjoying football and boxing. Leaving the movie business in the late 1950s, Buster settled in Beaverton, Oregon, with his wife and two daughters. He became a jockeys' agent. He worked the horse-racing tracks of the West Coast of the United States every racing season.

Having met when working on several of Flynn's vehicles, Buster and Errol Flynn became firm friends during the latter's time in Hollywood. Wiles was born in 1910 and died in 1990. Donati has published additional books and teaches literature at the university level.
