= Holly Street Bridge =

- Coordinates: 34.148746°N 118.165426°W
- Carries: 1 lane of Holly Street
- Crosses: Arroyo Seco
- Locale: Pasadena
- Official name: Holly Street Bridge
- Other name: Linda Vista Bridge
- Owner: City of Pasadena

Characteristics
- Material: Concrete
- Total length: 423 ft (129 m)
- Height: 70 ft (21 m)
- Longest span: 240 ft (73 m)

History
- Designer: W.C. Earle
- Construction cost: $100,000
- Opened: 1925

Directly north of the Colorado Street Bridge, Holly Street Bridge is the northernmost of the bridges that cross the Arroyo Seco (Los Angeles County) in Pasadena, CA. The concrete arch bridge was designed by W.C. Earle, city engineer, and replaced the 1909 Linda Vista Bridge.

== History ==
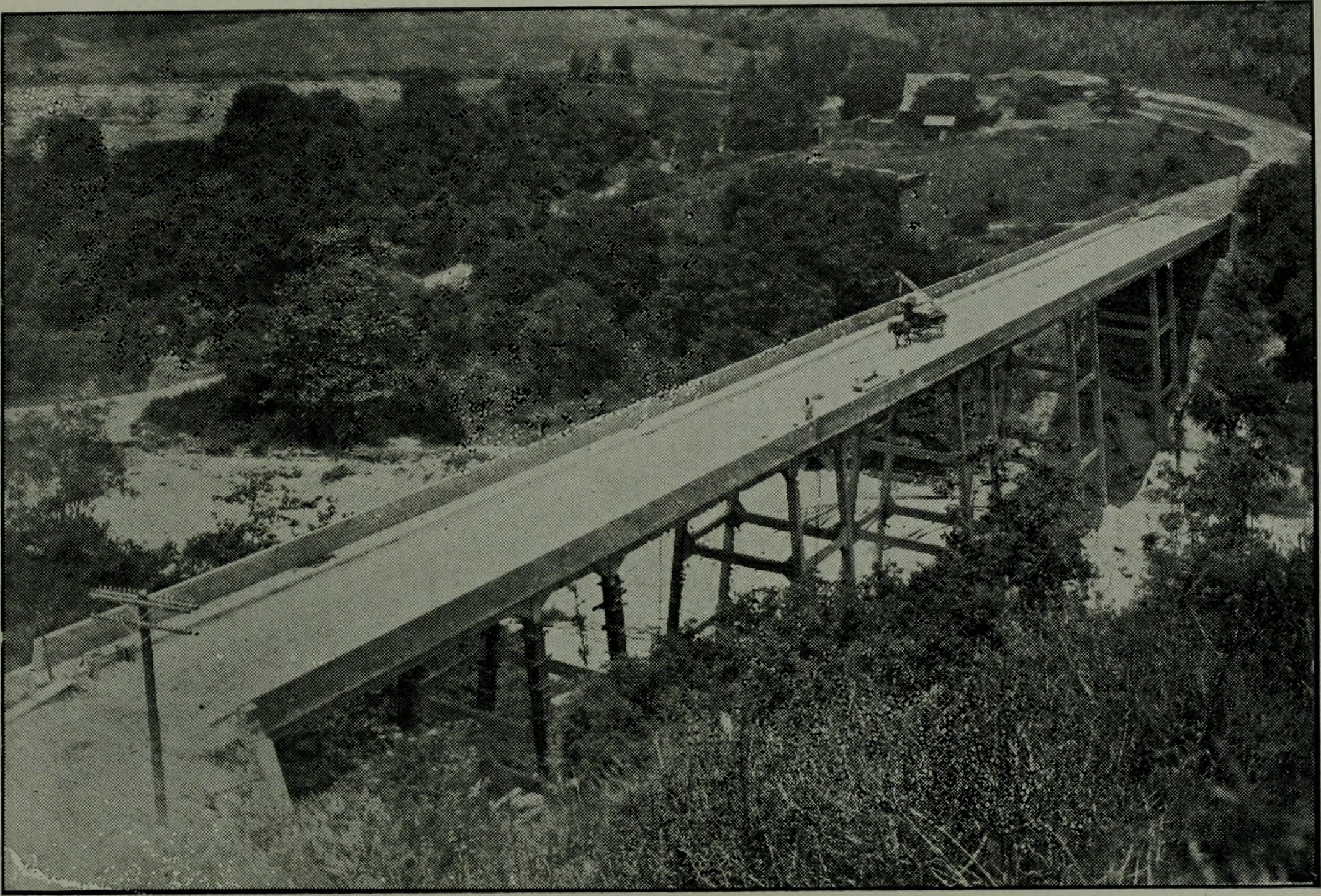
Linda Vista reinforced concrete bridge (1909).jpg

The older Linda Vista Bridge was determined to be defective even before it opened to the public. Photographer and Pasadena resident, George Wharton James noticed sags on each side and a large crack extending across the middle pier and questioned city officials about it. Ultimately, the 1909 bridge was condemned as unsafe and destroyed by California Institute of Technology students using TNT.

When the new bridge opened to the public on April 11, 1925, it was known as the Linda Vista Bridge. At the time, the bridge cost approximately $100,000 and it was believed to be the longest and highest concrete span of any bridge in the west. The engineer-in-charge of that construction was Alvin LeVan.

The bridge has been the site of some accidental injuries and fatalities over the years. The bridge has also become integrated with the surrounding community as a place for seclusion and for graffiti art.

The City of Pasadena proposed a seismic retrofit project for the Holly Street Bridge in 2019. Caltrans considers the bridge to be structurally deficient.

== Design ==
Holly Street Bridge features an open spandrel design and Neoclassical style, like the other Arroyo Seco bridges. It features an ornate concrete railing, antique lighting and a large central arch. The bridge is 423 feet long, 70 feet high, and with a central span 240 feet in length. It is listed in the National Register of Historic Places.

== Gallery ==
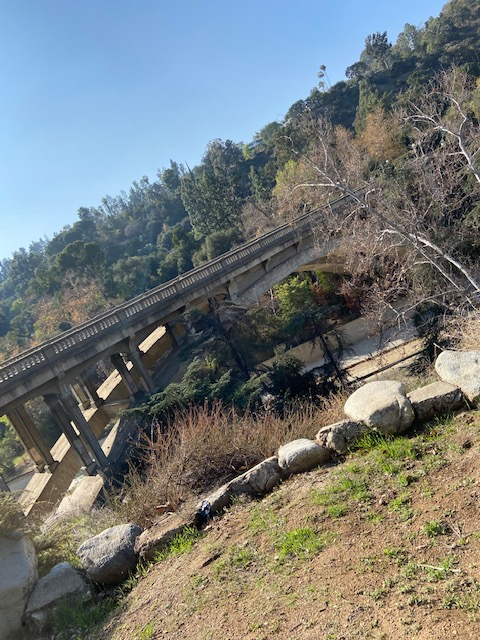
View of the Holly Street Bridge

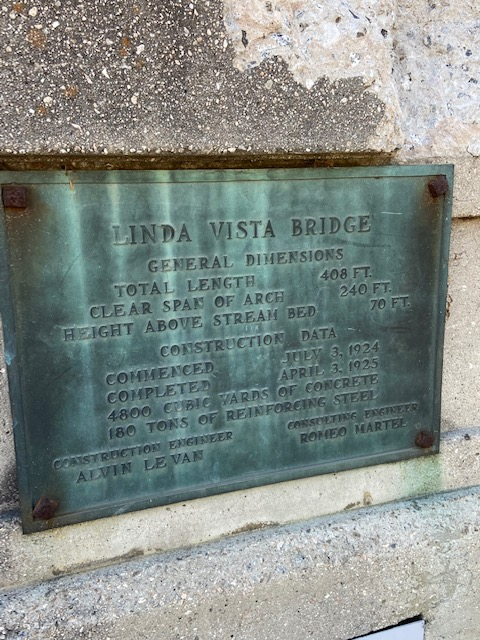
Plaque describing the Linda Vista Bridge

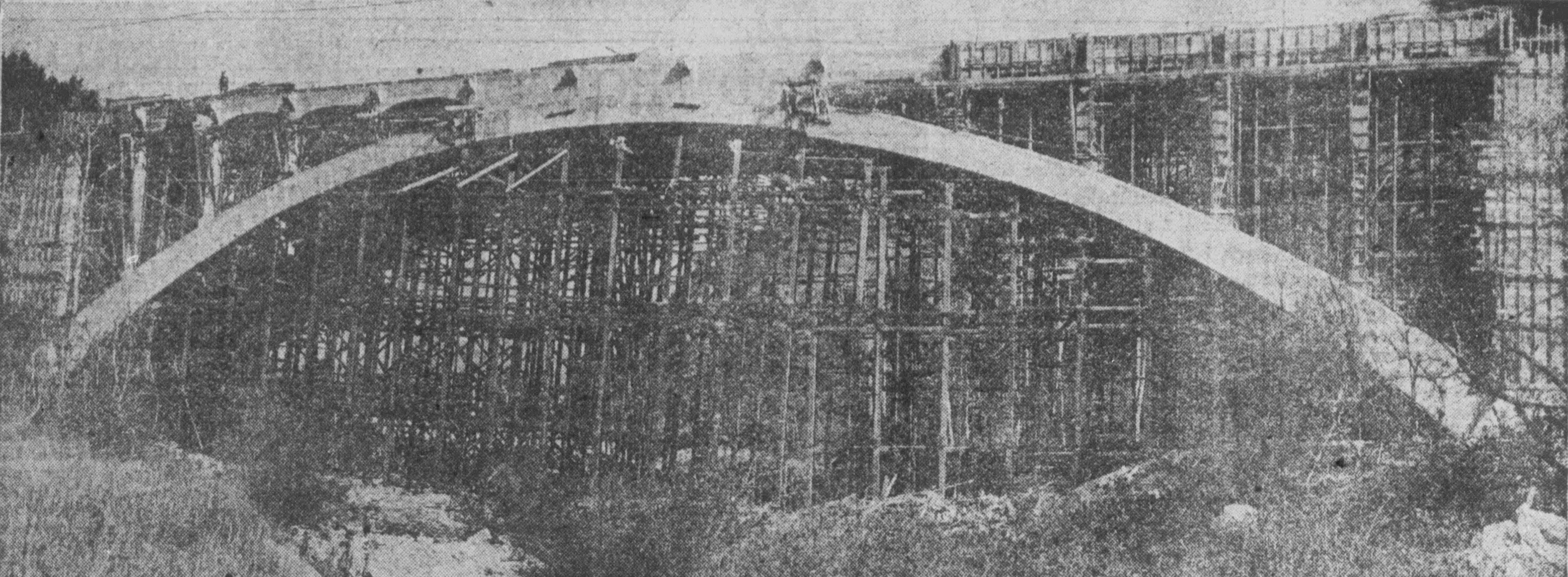
Holly Street Bridge Under Construction in 1925
