= Lower Arroyo Seco Historic District =

Historic district in California, United States

- U.S. National Register of Historic Places
- U.S. Historic district
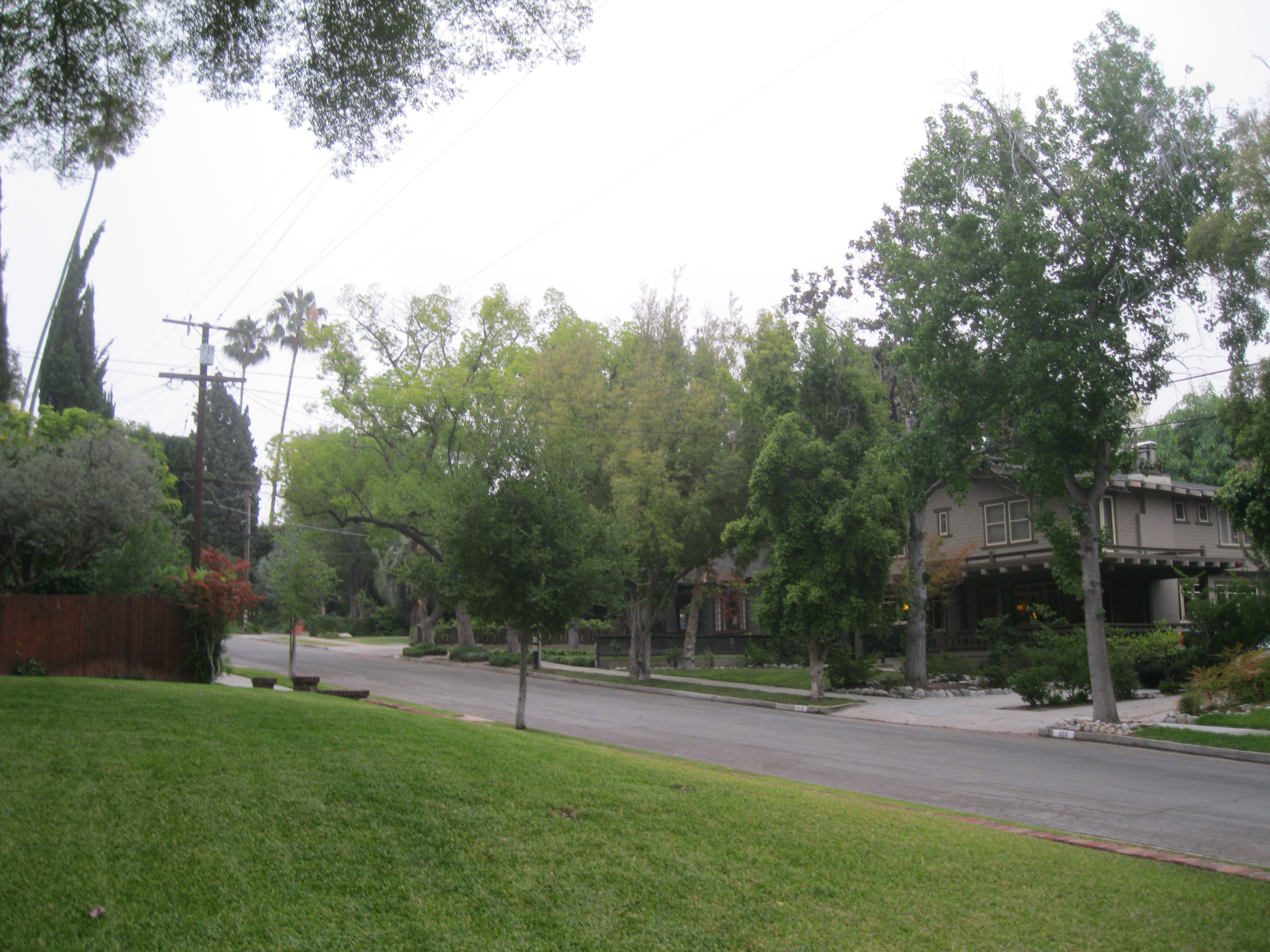
- Homes on La Loma Road in the district

- Location within the Los Angeles metropolitan area Location within California Location within the United States
- Location: Roughly Arroyo Blvd., W. California Blvd., La Loma Blvd., Pasadena, California
- Coordinates: 34.1351°N 118.16269°W
- Area: 0 acres (0 ha)
- Architectural style: American Craftsman
- MPS: Residential Architecture of Pasadena: Influence of the Arts and Crafts Movement MPS
- NRHP reference No.: 04000331
- Added to NRHP: July 12, 2005

The Lower Arroyo Seco Historic District is a residential historic district in Pasadena, California. The historic district encompasses homes located within the Lower Arroyo, Pasadena, California neighborhood along Arroyo Boulevard, California Boulevard, La Loma Road, and Grand Avenue. The district includes 78 contributing homes, the majority of which were influenced by the Arts and Crafts movement. During the early twentieth century, when most of the homes in the district were constructed, Pasadena was one of three prominent centers of American Craftsman design, along with Chicago and the San Francisco Bay Area. The district includes a variety of Craftsman designs only matched by one other area in California, a hilly neighborhood in Berkeley. Several prominent architects, including Charles K. Sumner and Henry Mather Greene, designed homes in the district. The Batchelder House, home of tile designer Ernest Batchelder, is included in the district.

The district was added to the National Register of Historic Places on July 12, 2005.

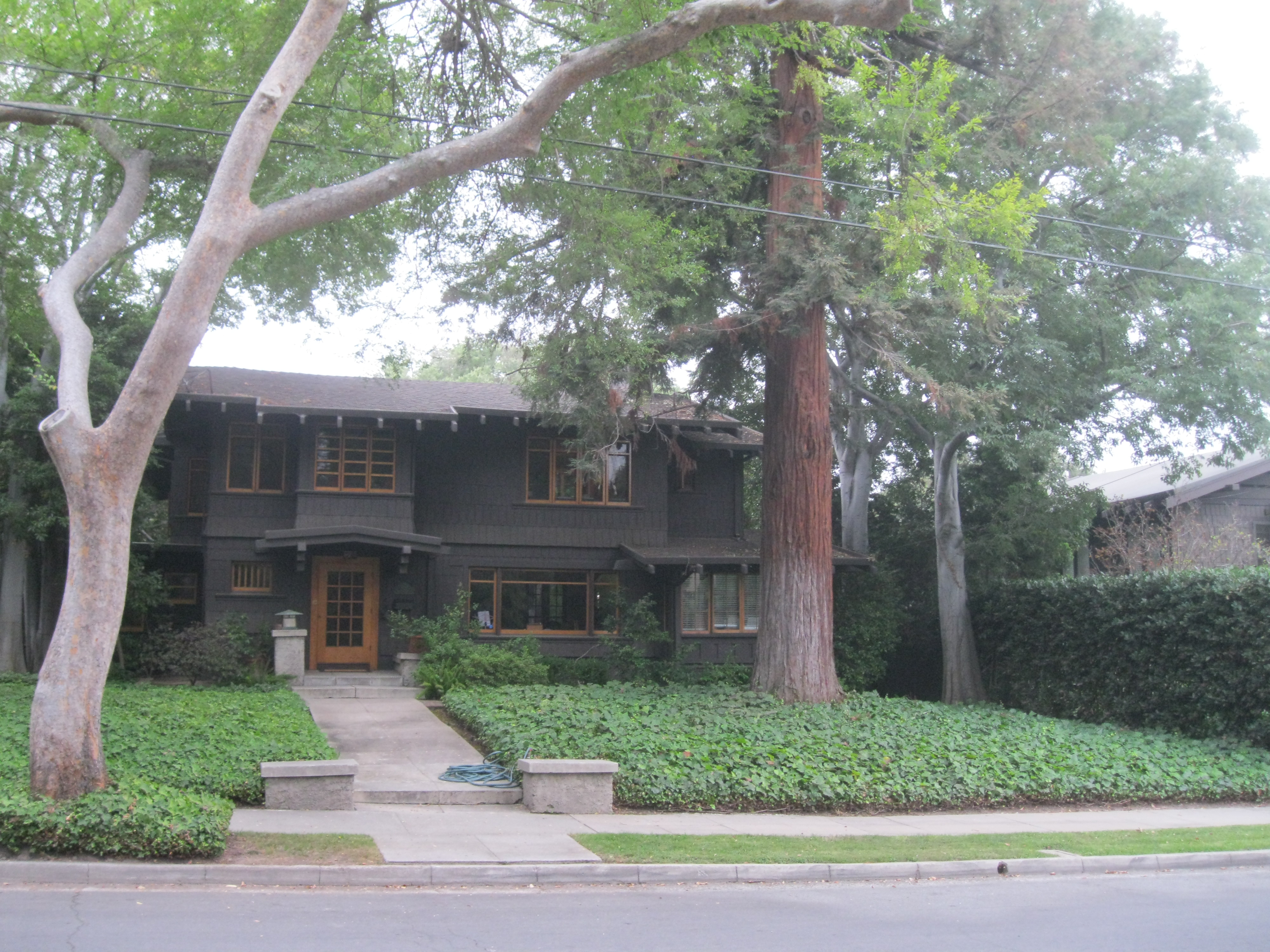
A home in the district
