= Songs from Suicide Bridge =

1984 studio album

Studio album by Eric Caboor and David Kauffman
- Released: June 1984
- Recorded: 1983
- Studio: Childhood home of Eric Caboor, Burbank, California
- Genre: Folk rock; lo-fi; slowcore
- Length: 54:07 (original); 54:48 (reissue)
- Label: Donkey Soul Music; Light in the Attic
- Producer: Eric Caboor and David Kauffman

Eric Caboor and David Kauffman chronology
Songs from Suicide Bridge (1984)	Beyond the Blue (1989)

Songs from Suicide Bridge is an album by Eric Caboor and David Kauffman, self-released on their private label Donkey Soul Music in 1984. The pair recorded the album at Caboor's childhood home in Burbank, California, from within a repurposed tool shed and using a four-track recorder. A folk-rock album, critics have highlighted its dark lyrics, slow tempo, and sparse instrumentation.

Caboor and Kauffman recorded 13 songs for the album but were forced to pare down the final selection to just 10 songs, owing to the length limitations of the LP format. Only 500 LPs were pressed, and despite shopping the album around at various mainstream and college radio stations, the album sold poorly and languished in obscurity for several decades. In 2015, Songs from Suicide Bridge was reissued by Light in the Attic Records. It has since received largely positive reviews; critics regard the album as having an ahead-of-its-time sound, prefiguring the slowcore genre by nearly a decade.

== Background and recording ==
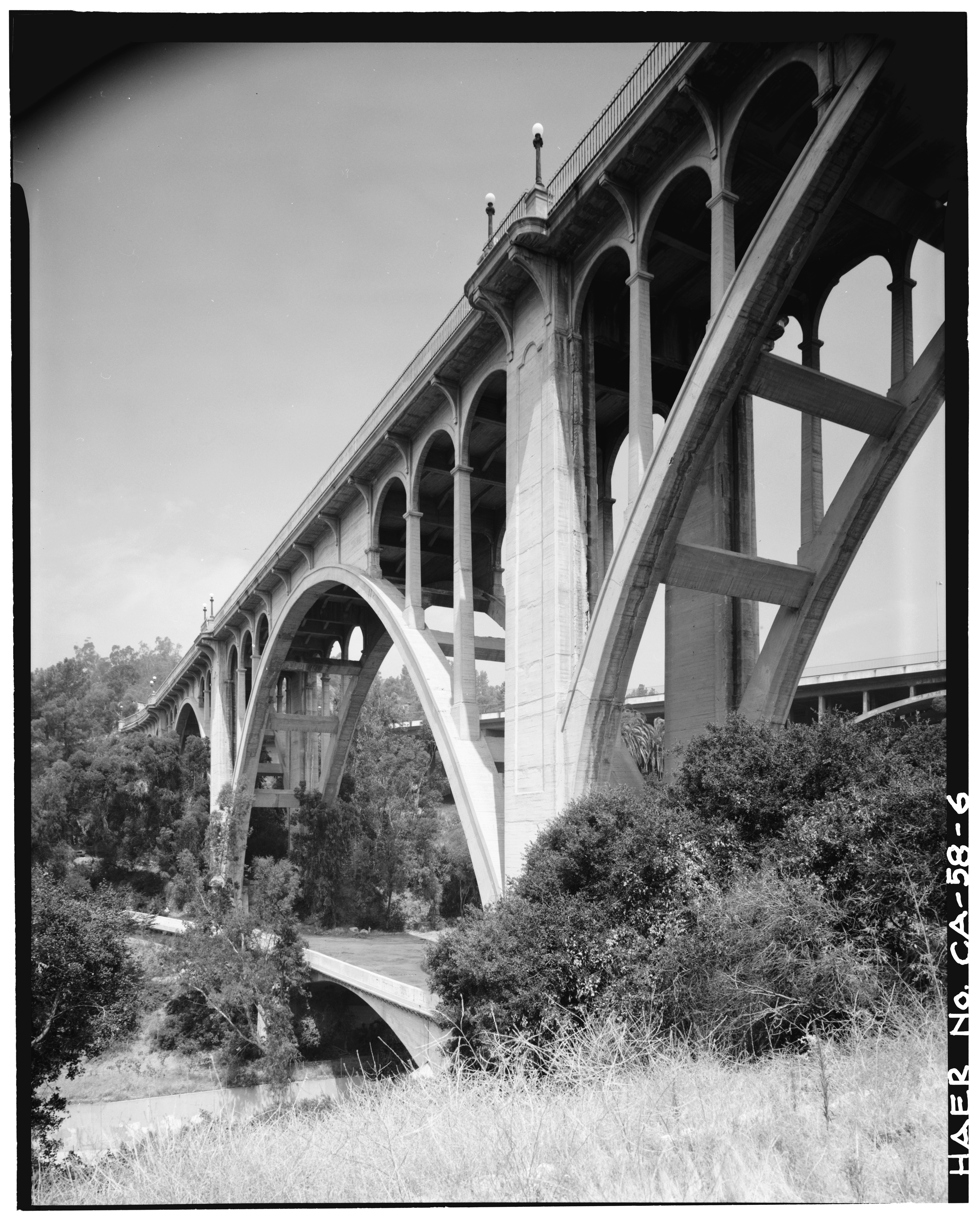
The Colorado Street "Suicide" Bridge in Pasadena, California, pictured in 1988. The bridge lends the album its name and is also featured in the cover art.

Eric Caboor and David Kauffman were both musicians in the local coffee house folk rock scene when they met at the Basement coffee shop in the Echo Park neighborhood of Los Angeles in October 1981. Caboor had lived his entire life in Los Angeles, while Kauffman had moved there from New Jersey in October 1978 to pursue a songwriting career. The latter lived in an apartment on North Sycamore Avenue and Hollywood Boulevard, working a day job as a waiter at the nearby Hamburger Hamlet across the street from Mann's Chinese Theatre. Before moving, he had majored in music education at Indiana University in the mid-1970s. Caboor, meanwhile, lived at his childhood home in Burbank, where his father had built a tool shed in the backyard that also served as rehearsal space and a makeshift recording studio for Eric. Kauffman was impressed by Caboor's songwriting skills; the two later met outside of work, where they talked of joining forces as a duo. By late 1982, they began tossing around the idea of releasing a record with songs from their repertoire.

The album is marked by pervasively depressive lyrics, slow tempo, spare instrumentation, and lo-fi production, with songs penned by both Caboor and Kauffman. According to Kauffman, him and Caboor were both naturally introverted and pensive, leading to the dark subject matter in their songs. Also cited was disillusionment with trying to break into the LA folk rock scene and the music industry at large. A major turning point in their career occurred after the duo had seen Danny O'Keefe perform at McCabe's in Santa Monica in 1983. The duo were awestruck by his virtuoso but disheartened by his then relative obscurity. Said Kauffman: "After the show, we were feeling down and talking about it, and I can still remember looking at my girlfriend for some kind of relief, and she had nothing for us. That impressed on me even more how good he was. So that was a bad night for us". Although they felt defeated by the show and performed live much less often as a result, they were still confident in their abilities as a studio act and wanted to preserve their songwriting in LP form.

The album was recorded in Caboor's roughly 180-square-foot converted tool shed, which had a four-track recorder inside. The duo recorded 13 songs for the album but were forced to pare down the final selection to just 10 songs, owing to the length limitations of the LP format. The album was recorded on a tight budget, the majority of the expense going toward pressing the initial run of 500 LPs, which cost them $3,000 in personal savings. Kauffman reflected: "[T]he thing that really saved us is that we weren't spending any money on a studio. That allowed us to do take after take after take and not have to sweat about how long it was taking".

Songs from Suicide Bridge gets its name from the Colorado Street Bridge in Pasadena, a historic arch bridge spanning the Arroyo Seco that is also a notorious suicide destination. (Note: The album was almost titled Greetings from Suicide Bridge.) The idea for this motif came from Caboor, who had known about the bridge. He had his friend Albert Dobrovitz shoot a number of black-and-white photos of the duo standing on the Colorado Street Bridge, one of which adorns the front cover. The duo named their record label Donkey Soul Music, a corruption of Donkey's Hole, itself a play on words of their original intended name of Asshole Records.

== Release ==
Songs from Suicide Bridge was released in June 1984. Of the 500 LPs pressed, several were sent out to local and remote radio stations both mainstream and college-based. Although no local radio stations expressed any interest in Songs from Suicide Bridge, the duo did find some airplay in Nova Scotia and Alaska, which Kauffman found appropriate given their desolate and cold environments. Between then and the 2000s, the album languished in obscurity. Caboor and Kauffman would continue to perform in LA nevertheless, rebranding as the Drovers in the late 1980s and releasing two more albums through Donkey Soul—Beyond the Blue (1989) and Tightrope Town (1992). Kauffman eventually returned to New Jersey in 2001 to aid his elderly father, while Caboor started a family with his wife.

Sometime in the 2000s, the album saw a limited CD reissue in South Korea. In March 2015, Light in the Attic Records announced that they were reissuing a remastered version of Songs from Suicide Bridge sourced from the master tapes, celebrating its 30th anniversary. It was released in May 2015 as a two LP set and as a CD. The reissue features extensive liner notes featuring an interview with the artists and unseen photographs of the duo.

== Reception ==
Professional ratings
Review scores
Source	Rating
The Attic	3.5/5 stars
Pitchfork	7.4/10
Record Collector	4/5 stars
Shindig!	3/5 stars
Uncut	4.5/5 stars

On its 2015 re-release, the album received praise from music critics, with some regarding it as having an ahead-of-its-time sound. Pitchfork's Stephen M. Deusner wrote that the album "doesn't sound like a product of the hedonistic '80s. Instead, it seems to predict the dire introspection of the '90s". He singled out "Angel of Mercy" as featuring a brand of brooding lyrics that would not become popular until nearly a decade after, with the rise of Nirvana and Nine Inch Nails. Matt Jarosinski of WSUM wrote that the album prefigured the slowcore genre, "with its intimate performances and lyrics sharing some resemblance to a foundational bands within the genre like Red House Painters or American Music Club". Record Collector's Paul Bowler found that the album's threadbare production "lends a welcome lo-fi ambience to the clutch of sparse, eerily beautiful vignettes of urban loneliness", writing that the album sounded "remarkably contemporary" with 2010s indie folk. The Arts Desk's Kieron Tyler wrote: "[B]arely released in 1984, [it's] as good as James Taylor at his most naked, and as evocative as Elliott Smith. The album sounds as if it could have been recorded at any point between 1967 and now".

Laura Barton of The Guardian called the album one of her favorite albums of 2015. She singled out the opening track "Kiss Another Day Goodbye" as capturing "precisely the moment when the California dream turns, and the land looks lonely and parched". Stereogum's Caitlin White wrote: "These aren't depressing songs—they're the vicious, living and breathing specters of depression itself". Alastair McKay of Uncut gave it a nearly perfect score, calling it an "extraordinary record" of "private-press loser-folk". Hugh Dellar of Shindig! wrote that the album "starts out bleak and then progresses on into the kind of stilled stark silence that almost erases its own being". Scott D. Wilkinson of The Attic wrote: "While some of the songs linger a bit too long for their own good, Songs from Suicide Bridge has a sufficient number of compelling moments to describe it as a worthwhile listening experience and an album that only could have come out of early-1980s L.A. and its environs".

== Track listing ==
=== Original 1984 LP ===
Side one
No.	Title	Writer(s)	Length
1.	"Kiss Another Day Goodbye"	David Kauffman	4:48
2.	"Neighborhood Blues"	Eric Caboor	4:00
3.	"Life Without Love"	Kauffman	5:11
4.	"Angel of Mercy"	Caboor	4:57
5.	"Life and Times on the Beach"	Kauffman	7:55

Side two
No.	Title	Writer(s)	Length
6.	"Backwoods"	Caboor	8:09
7.	"Midnight Willie"	Caboor–Kauffman	6:54
8.	"Where's the Understanding?"	Kauffman	2:09
9.	"Tinsel Town"	Kauffman	5:42
10.	"One More Day (You'll Fly Again)"	Caboor	4:22
Total length:			54:07

=== 2015 double LP reissue ===
Side one
No.	Title	Writer(s)	Length
1.	"Kiss Another Day Goodbye"	David Kauffman	4:53
2.	"Neighborhood Blues"	Eric Caboor	4:01
3.	"Life Without Love"	Kauffman	5:16

Side two
No.	Title	Writer(s)	Length
4.	"Angel of Mercy"	Caboor	5:03
5.	"Life and Times on the Beach"	Kauffman	8:02

Side three
No.	Title	Writer(s)	Length
6.	"Backwoods"	Caboor	8:14
7.	"Midnight Willie"	Caboor–Kauffman	6:54
8.	"Where's the Understanding?"	Kauffman	2:09

Side four
No.	Title	Writer(s)	Length
9.	"Tinsel Town"	Kauffman	5:42
10.	"One More Day (You'll Fly Again)"	Caboor	4:34
Total length:			54:48

== Personnel ==
From the 2015 Light in the Attic reissue liner notes:

- Eric Caboor – acoustic guitar, electric guitar, slide guitar, steel guitar, mandolin, dulcimer, vocals, production
- David Kauffman – acoustic guitar, piano, bass guitar, vocals, production
