= Sword Fishing =

- Written by: De Leon Anthony
- Produced by: Howard Hill
- Narrated by: Ronald Reagan
- Cinematography: Albert Wetzel
- Edited by: De Leon Anthony
- Release date: October 21, 1939
- Running time: 10 minutes
- Country: United States
- Language: English

Sword Fishing is a 1939 short documentary film. In 1940, it was nominated for an Academy Award for Best Live Action Short Film, One-Reel at the 12th Academy Awards. It is narrated by Ronald Reagan.

== Cast ==
- Howard Hill as himself
- Ronald Reagan as the narrator
