= The Gamblers (1929 film) =

1929 film by Michael Curtiz

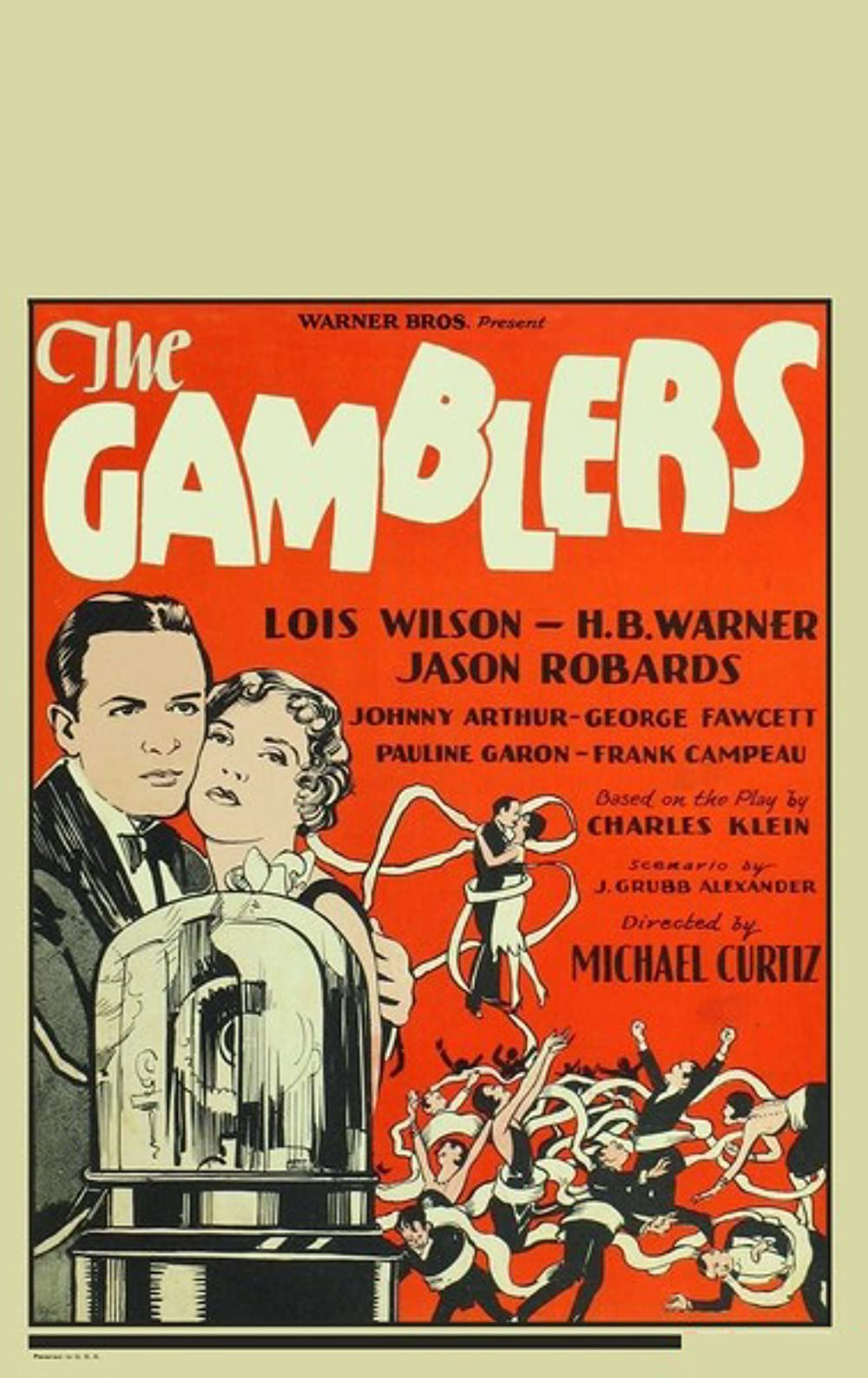
- Directed by: Michael Curtiz
- Written by: De Leon Anthony (titles)
- Screenplay by: J. Grubb Alexander (screenplay and dialogue)
- Based on: the 1910 play The Gamblers by Charles Klein
- Starring: H. B. Warner; Lois Wilson; Jason Robards Sr.
- Cinematography: William Reese
- Edited by: Thomas Pratt
- Music by: Alois Reiser
- Production company: Warner Bros. Pictures
- Distributed by: Warner Bros. Pictures
- Release date: June 29, 1929 (US)
- Running time: 71 minutes
- Country: United States
- Language: English

The Gamblers is a 1929 American sound (All-Talking) drama film directed by Michael Curtiz, and starring H. B. Warner, Lois Wilson, and Jason Robards Sr. It was produced and distributed by Warner Bros. Pictures.

== Plot ==
Carvel Emerson Jr. is a junior executive at the Emerson Trust Company, a major New York financial institution headquartered in a towering sixty-story building near the curb market. Alongside fellow partners Raymond and Tooker, Carvel engages in an unauthorized scheme to borrow five million dollars from the firm's own capital to fund speculative stock market operations. In place of legitimate collateral, they deposit unsecured personal promissory notes, including one that had been signed in blank by Carvel's father, Carvel Emerson Sr., the retired founder and current figurehead president of the firm. Emerson Sr. is unaware of the note's intended use.

The notes are placed inside the company's vault, secured with a time lock set to open at 10:00 a.m. the following morning. That evening, the conspirators receive alarming news: a federal bank examiner is scheduled to inspect the firm early the next day, before the vault can be accessed. With the incriminating documents trapped behind the time lock, the risk of exposure becomes imminent.

Later that night, Carvel discovers George Cowper, a long-trusted employee, inside the vault. Cowper explains that he mistakenly set the time lock to activate for the night rather than the following morning and had returned to ensure the vault's security. He then hands Carvel the notes, appearing to resolve the crisis.

Meanwhile, Carvel learns through his sister Isabel that Catherine, his former sweetheart, is visiting New York. He persuades her to attend a birthday party that evening in honor of his father. At the party, Catherine reveals that she is now married to James Darwin, a former college classmate of Carvel's. She explains that she could not marry Carvel once she discovered his compulsive gambling habits, though she admits she still returns his affection.

Darwin, a prosecutor in the attorney general's office, had ostensibly left on a trip to Washington. In reality, he remains in New York. Upon discovering that Catherine is at the Emerson residence, he arrives unannounced, driven by jealousy and suspicion, and forcibly takes her home.

During the same evening, Carvel and his partners—Raymond and Tooker—convene privately to discuss the firm's legal exposure. It is agreed that Carvel will take full responsibility for the illicit borrowing and claim that he acted alone. Carvel then reveals that Cowper has already retrieved the notes from the vault. However, upon examination, the men realize the returned notes are forgeries. The original documents have vanished.

Carvel confronts Cowper and forces a confession: Cowper has handed the genuine notes over to Darwin, who is planning to use them as the basis for a prosecution against the Emerson group.

That night, Carvel climbs the fire escape to Darwin's home to retrieve the evidence. Inside, he finds Catherine, alone in the parlor and dressed in a negligee, playing the piano. She discovers him moments before Darwin returns—having never gone to Washington as he claimed—and catches the two together. Though Darwin quickly learns the real purpose of Carvel's intrusion, he remains consumed by jealousy and orders Carvel's arrest.

On the day of the trial, Catherine confronts her husband in his office adjacent to the courtroom. She threatens that if he proceeds with the case, she will declare her love for Carvel publicly in court.

== Cast ==
- H. B. Warner as James Darwin
- Lois Wilson as Catherine Darwin
- Jason Robards Sr., as Carvel Emerson Jr.
- George Fawcett as Carvel Emerson Sr.
- Johnny Arthur as George Cowper
- Frank Campeau as Raymond
- Pauline Garon as Isabel Emerson
- Charles Sellon as Tooker

== Music ==
The film featured a theme song entitled "If I Came Back To You And Said I'm Sorry" which was written and composed by Will D. Cobb and Gus Edwards.

== Preservation ==
With no prints of The Gamblers located in any film archives, it is a lost film.

== See also ==
- List of early sound feature films (1926–1929)
