= William Donati =

American biographer and academic

William Donati is an American biographer and academic. He holds four university degrees in literature, including a PhD in English.

Donati gained national attention when he charged that author Charles Higham had committed literary fraud in his book Errol Flynn: The Untold Story (Doubleday 1980), which claimed that Flynn had been a spy for Germany and was involved in the bombing of Pearl Harbor. Donati investigated the controversy and accused Higham of altering a government surveillance document in the paperback version to make it appear that Flynn had been identified as a Nazi spy, as reported in the Los Angeles Times. Donati had co-authored My Days With Errol Flynn (Roundtable 1988), the autobiography of stuntman Buster Wiles, Flynn's close friend, and his research on Higham's claims appears in a section of the book. Donati and Wiles were guests on Geraldo in a segment about Errol Flynn, Cary Grant, and Richard Burton.

Donati is also the author of Ida Lupino: A Biography. The biography was recognized as a realistic account with documentation: "We have only to read on to see that so much of what led to an extraordinary career will be gnawed at by inner turmoil, alcohol and decades of being one's own worst enemy."

He also wrote Lucky Luciano: The Rise and Fall of a Mob Boss (McFarland 2010) He examined over 40,000 archival documents, and presented "Lucky's world of drugs, gambling, prostitution, and gang rival killings". The biography has a strong anti-gangster tone that criticized the underworld and praised special prosecutor Thomas E. Dewey.

Donati's most recent book is The Life and Death of Thelma Todd (McFarland 2012). Donati appeared in an episode of "Hollywood Mysteries and Scandals" in 1998 examining Todd's 1935 death, which remains one of Hollywood's most enduring unsolved mysteries. Hot Toddy by Andy Edmonds asserted the actress had been murdered by Lucky Luciano, a claim Donati disputes. Arts writer Thomas Gladysz listed it as one of the Best Film Books of 2012.

In 2014, Donati was featured in ArtScene, a Las Vegas produced PBS program. He discusses his books and writing in a segment broadcast on PBS stations around the nation.
