= San Rafael Bridge (Pasadena) =

Bridge over the Arroyo Seco in Pasadena, California

Coordinates: 34.12562°N 118.16564°W

The southernmost of the Pasadena Arroyo Seco bridges, the San Rafael Bridge was constructed in 1922 in Pasadena, California. Like the Colorado Street Bridge built in 1913 and La Loma Bridge (renamed John K. Van De Kamp Bridge in 2017) built in 1914, the San Rafael Bridge is an open-spandrel concrete arch bridge that is open to pedestrians and car traffic. It was strengthened in 1990.

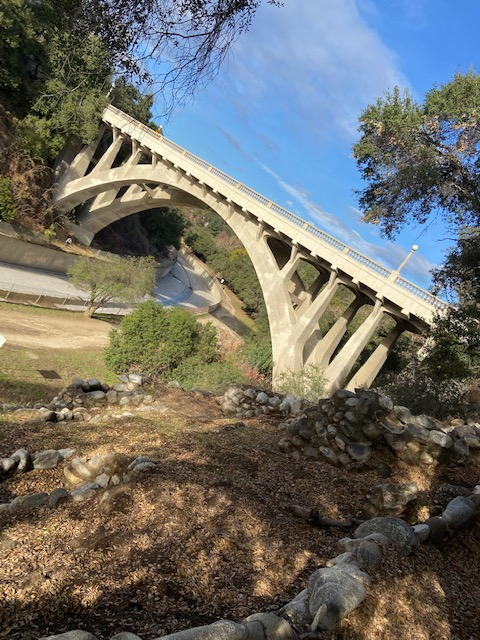
View of San Rafael Bridge in Pasadena from Arroyo

Stylistically speaking, the open spandrel area is simpler than that of the La Loma Bridge. The lights are cast iron and the balustrade has classical details. The bridge is 581 feet long, 68 feet high, and 32 feet wide. Edwin Dewey was the city engineer overseeing the project.

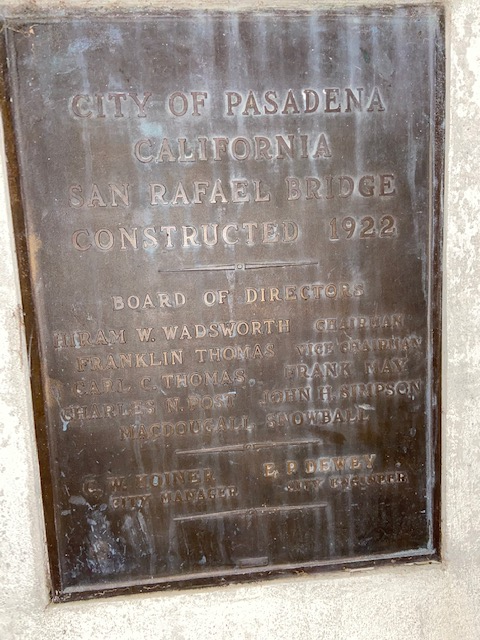
City of Pasadena San Rafael Bridge construction information

At one time, the San Rafael Bridge was called the Columbia Street Bridge. The bridge carries Laguna Road over the Arroyo to the San Rafael Heights neighborhood in Pasadena. Since the bridge carried the telephone, gas, electrical, and sewer systems, it was instrumental in the development of San Rafael Heights.

The stairs near the San Rafael Bridge are also noteworthy. The stairs once led to Busch Gardens, the personal gardens of Adolphus Busch, co-founder of Anheuser-Busch. Busch Gardens was open to the public in 1906 and closed in 1938. It was a major tourist attraction for many years.

The San Rafael Bridge is eligible for listing in the National Register of Historic Places.
