= Tembo (film) =

1951 American film directed by Howard Hill

- Directed by: Howard Hill; Carl Mikule (assistant)
- Produced by: Howard Hill; Bud McKinney; James Leicester
- Cinematography: Arthur E. Phelps
- Edited by: Thomas P. Pratt
- Music by: Claude Sweeten
- Production company: Howard Hill Productions
- Distributed by: RKO Radio Pictures
- Release dates: October 4, 1951 (Premiere-Dallas, TX); January 4, 1952 (US)
- Running time: 80 minutes
- Country: United States
- Language: English

Tembo is a 1951 American documentary film which follows the travels of hunter Howard Hill through equatorial Africa. Hill produced and directed the documentary. The expedition traveled 30,000 miles as they attempted to discover a remote tribe, called the "Leopard Men".
