= Colorado Street Bridge (Pasadena, California) =

Bridge in Pasadena, California, US

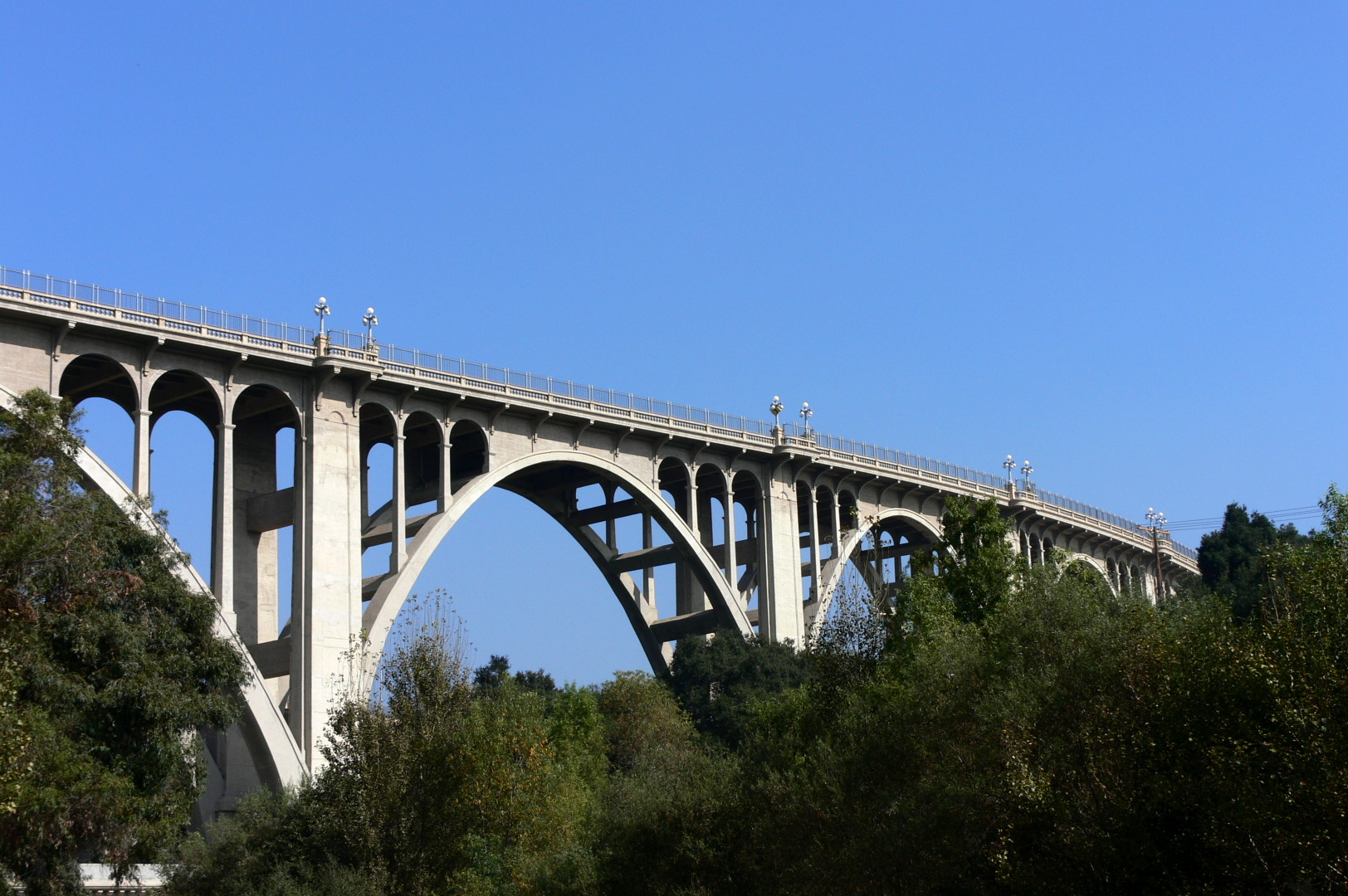
- Colorado Street Bridge seen from the Arroyo Seco below
- Coordinates: 34°08′42″N 118°09′50″W
- Carries: Colorado Boulevard
- Crosses: Arroyo Seco (Los Angeles County)
- Locale: Pasadena, CA
- Named for: State of Colorado
- Owner: City of Pasadena

Characteristics
- Design: Arch
- Material: Reinforced concrete
- Total length: 1,467.5 feet (447.3 m)
- Width: 38 feet (11.6 m)
- Height: 148.5 feet (45.3 m)
- Longest span: 233 feet (71 m)
- No. of lanes: 2

History
- Designer: Waddell & Harrington
- Constructed by: J. D. Mercerau
- Construction start: July 1912
- Construction cost: $240,000 (1913)
- Opened: December 12, 1913
- Colorado Street Bridge
- U.S. National Register of Historic Places
- California Register of Historical Resources
- Architectural style: Beaux-Arts
- NRHP reference No.: 81000156
- CRHR No.: N941

Significant dates
- Added to NRHP: February 12, 1981
- Designated CRHR: February 12, 1981

Location
- Interactive map of Colorado Street Bridge

Colorado Street Bridge is a historic concrete arch bridge spanning the Arroyo Seco in Pasadena, California. It is often called Pasadena Bridge and less commonly Suicide Bridge, the latter due to the high number of suicides that once occurred here.

== Route ==
Colorado Street Bridge carries Colorado Boulevard across the Arroyo Seco, connecting Pasadena with Eagle Rock and Glendale to the west. The bridge follows a curved path so that its footings sit on more solid ground than a straight bridge would have provided.

== History ==
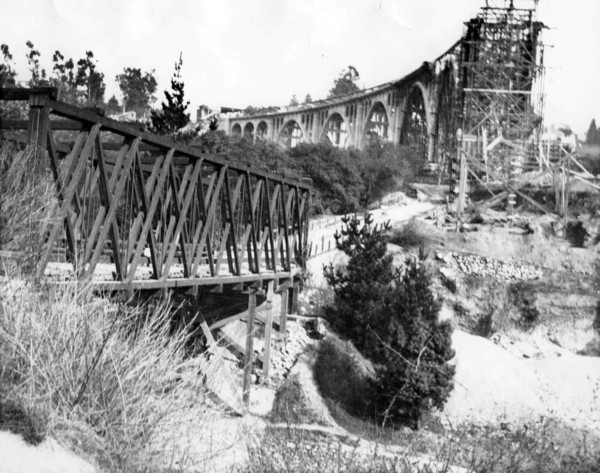
Scoville Bridge next to the partially completed Colorado Street Bridge, 1913

Colorado Street Bridge was designed by Waddell & Harrington and built for $191,000 in 1912 ($6.37 million in 2025). The bridge opened on December 13, 1913, replacing the smaller Scoville Bridge located near the bottom of the Arroyo Seco. According to myth, a construction worker who was caught in a concrete mixer during construction was poured into one of the bridge's supports.

The bridge was a part of U.S. Route 66 from c. 1936 to c. 1940.

Colorado Street Bridge was closed and renovated following the Loma Prieta earthquake in 1989; it reopened in 1993.

=== Suicide Bridge ===
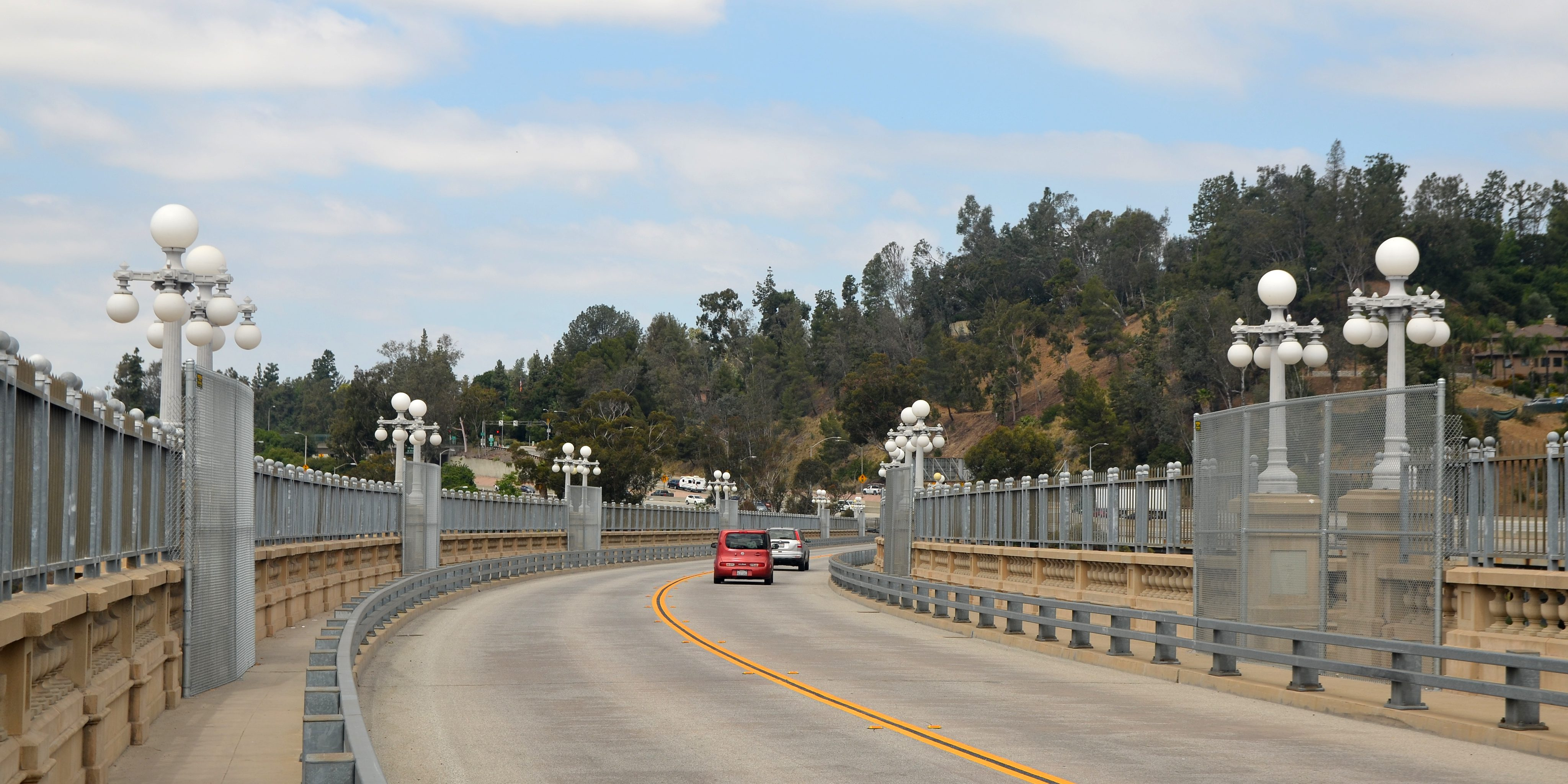
Roadway and suicide barriers

Colorado Street Bridge became known locally as "Suicide Bridge" after dozens of people used it to commit suicide in the early 20th century. By 1937, 87 people had jumped to their death from the bridge.

A 8-foot-high (2.4 m) barrier was added to the bridge during its renovation from 1989 and eventual reopening in December 1993 to deter suicides. Even so, on October 27, 2015, British-American model and reality television star Sam Sarpong used the bridge to leap to his death.

In 2016, a 10-foot-high (3.0 m) temporary chain link fence was installed on the bridge's sidewalk, blocking the seating alcoves which were believed to be the primary route taken by jumpers. In 2017, the bridge was the site of nine deaths, and an additional four occurred between January to September 2018, after which the temporary fences were extended to cover the entire bridge. The city plans to replace the temporary fencing with permanent barriers, at least 7.5 feet (2.3 m) in height.

== Architecture and design ==
The bridge spans 1,468 feet (447 m) at a maximum height of 150 feet (50 m) and features Beaux Arts arches, light standards, and railings. The bridge is listed on the National Register of Historic Places and has been designated a California Historic Civil Engineering Landmark.

== In culture ==
=== Movies and television ===
Love, Speed, and Thrills (1915), a Mack Sennett short film, includes a car chase that goes over the Colorado Street Bridge. The bridge appears in Charlie Chaplin's 1921 film The Kid, where a character is shown considering jumping from the bridge before Chaplin's character intervenes.

In the 2008 film Yes Man, the bridge was featured in a bungee jumping scene. In the 2016 film La La Land, the protagonists take an evening stroll across the bridge.

The bridge was featured in Full House's eighth season episode "Leap of Faith", where it was depicted as being in San Francisco; in ER's fourth season episode "Fathers and Sons", where it was depicted as being in San Diego; and in the Emergency! episode "To Buy or Not To Buy".

The bridge was featured in the Fear Factor stunt "Bridge Hang", which required contestants to hang from a trapeze bar hoisted over the edge of the bridge. In the episode, host Joe Rogan notes that the bridge used to be known as "Suicide Bridge." The bridge was also featured in beginning of season 21 of The Amazing Race, where contestants rappelled down the bridge to their waiting cars to start the race.

=== Music ===
The 1984 album Songs from Suicide Bridge by Eric Caboor and David Kauffman is named after this bridge. The album's black-and-white cover art features the duo standing on the bridge.

Part of the music video for the 2012 Lana Del Rey song "Summertime Sadness" was filmed on the bridge. In the video, actress Jaime King climbs over a section of the bridge and jumps off.

=== Other ===
The bridge is closed each summer for the "Celebration on the Colorado Street Bridge" festival, hosted by historic preservation group Pasadena Heritage.

== Gallery ==
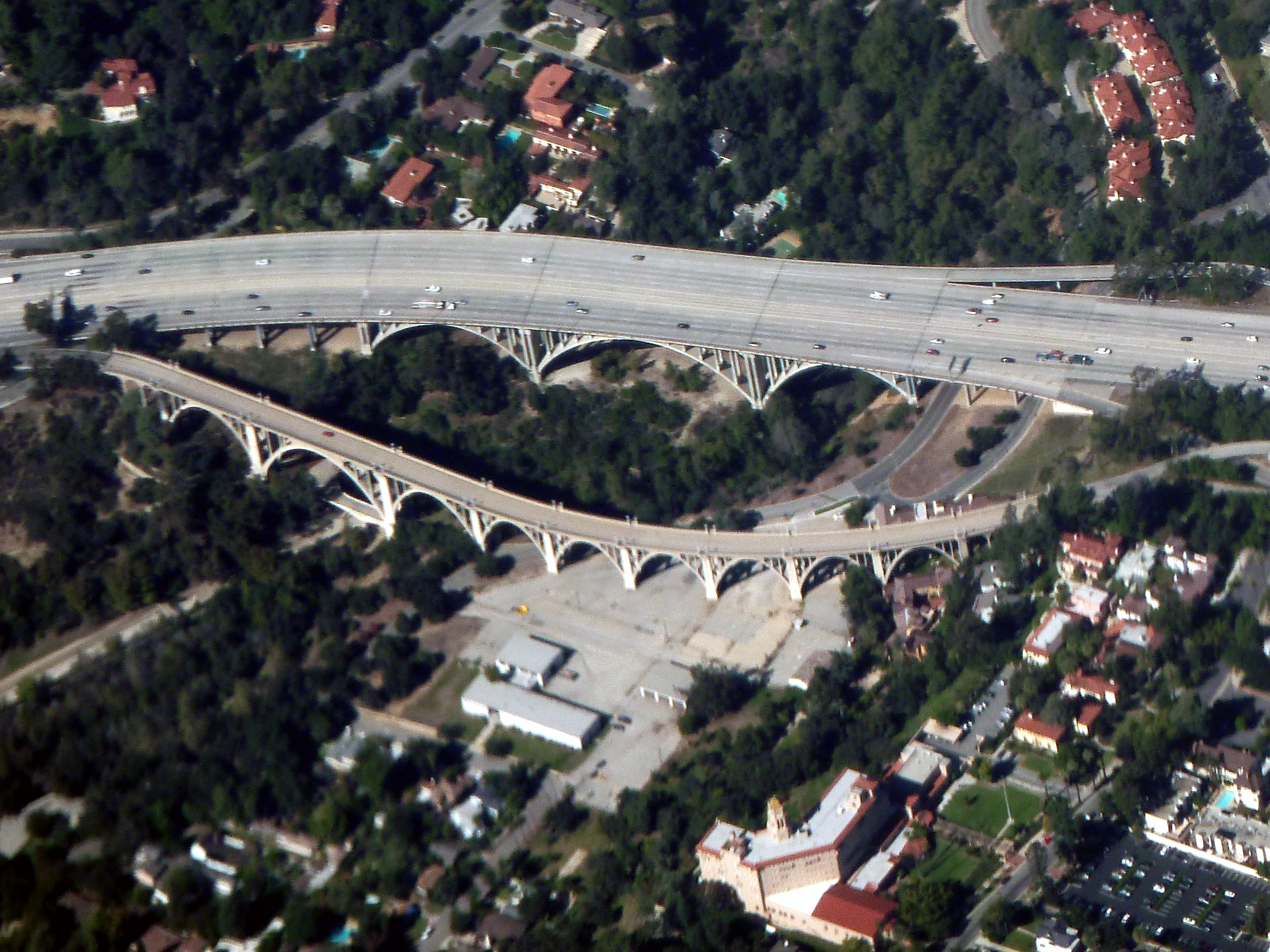
Colorado Street Bridge next to the Ventura Freeway

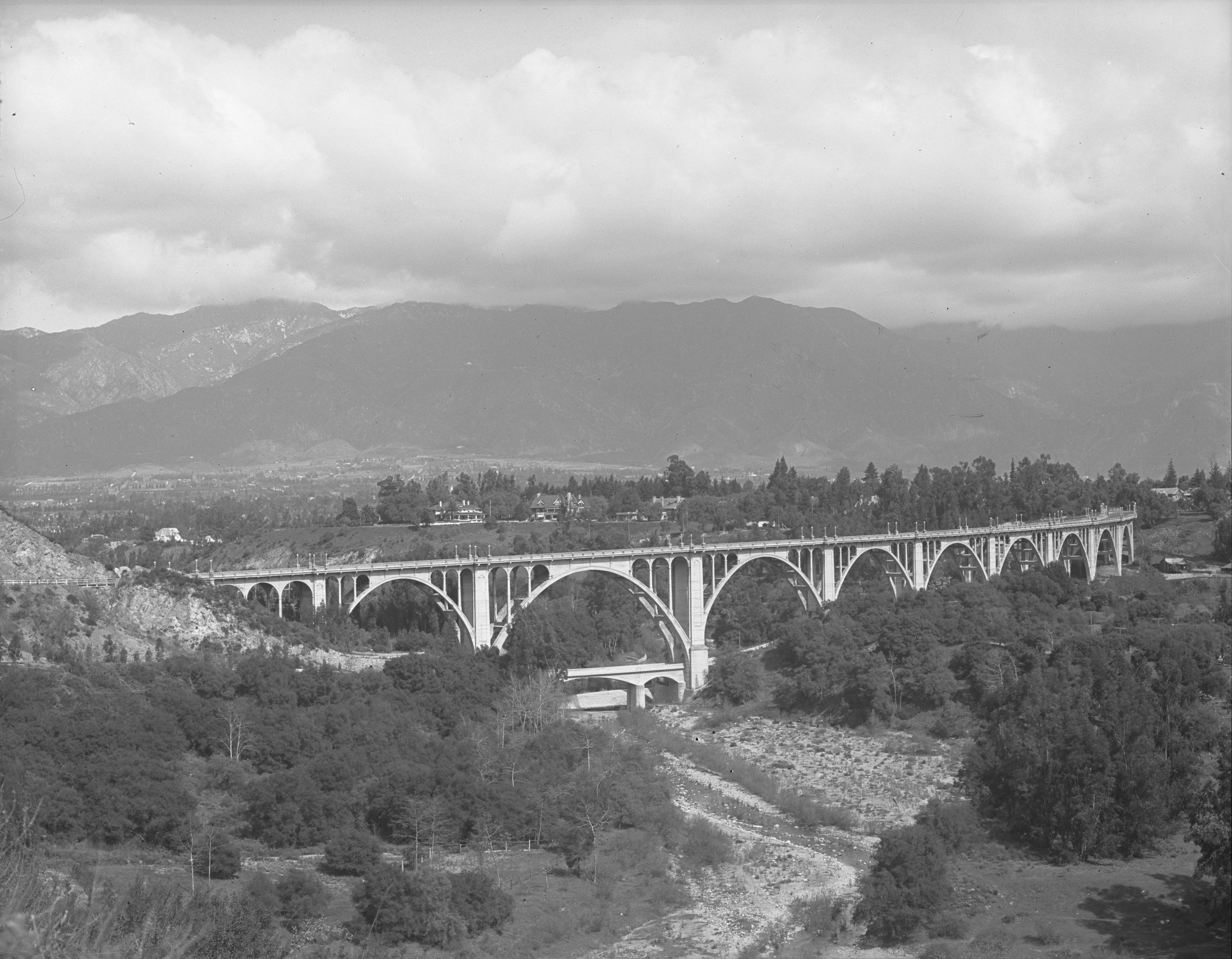
Colorado Street Bridge with the San Gabriel Mountains in the background, c. 1920

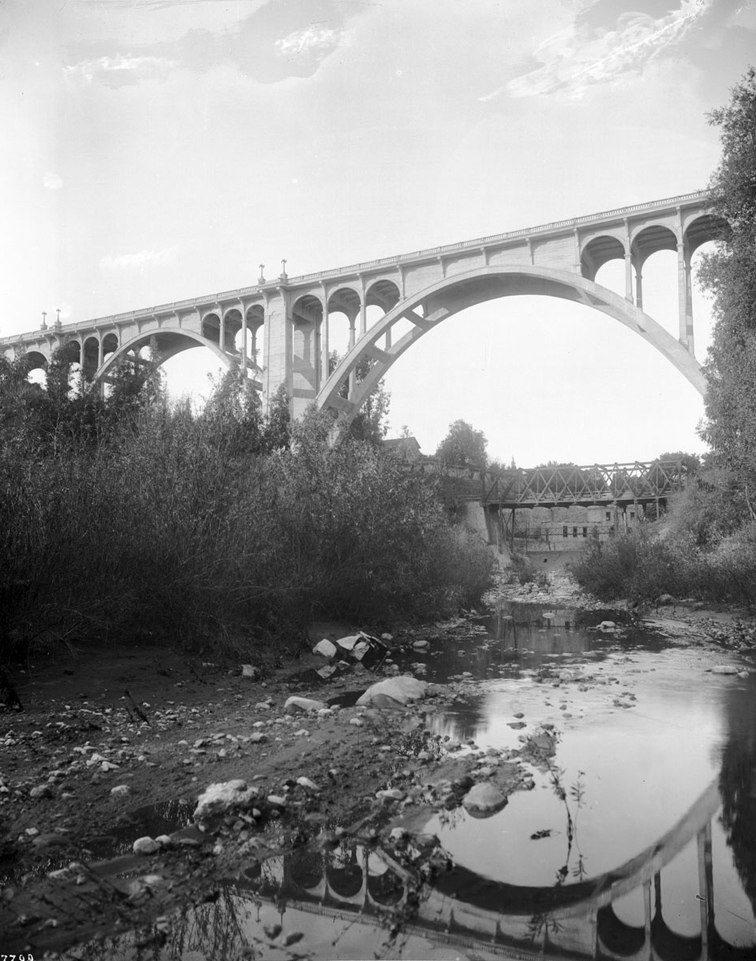
Colorado Street Bridge and Scoville Bridge, 1914

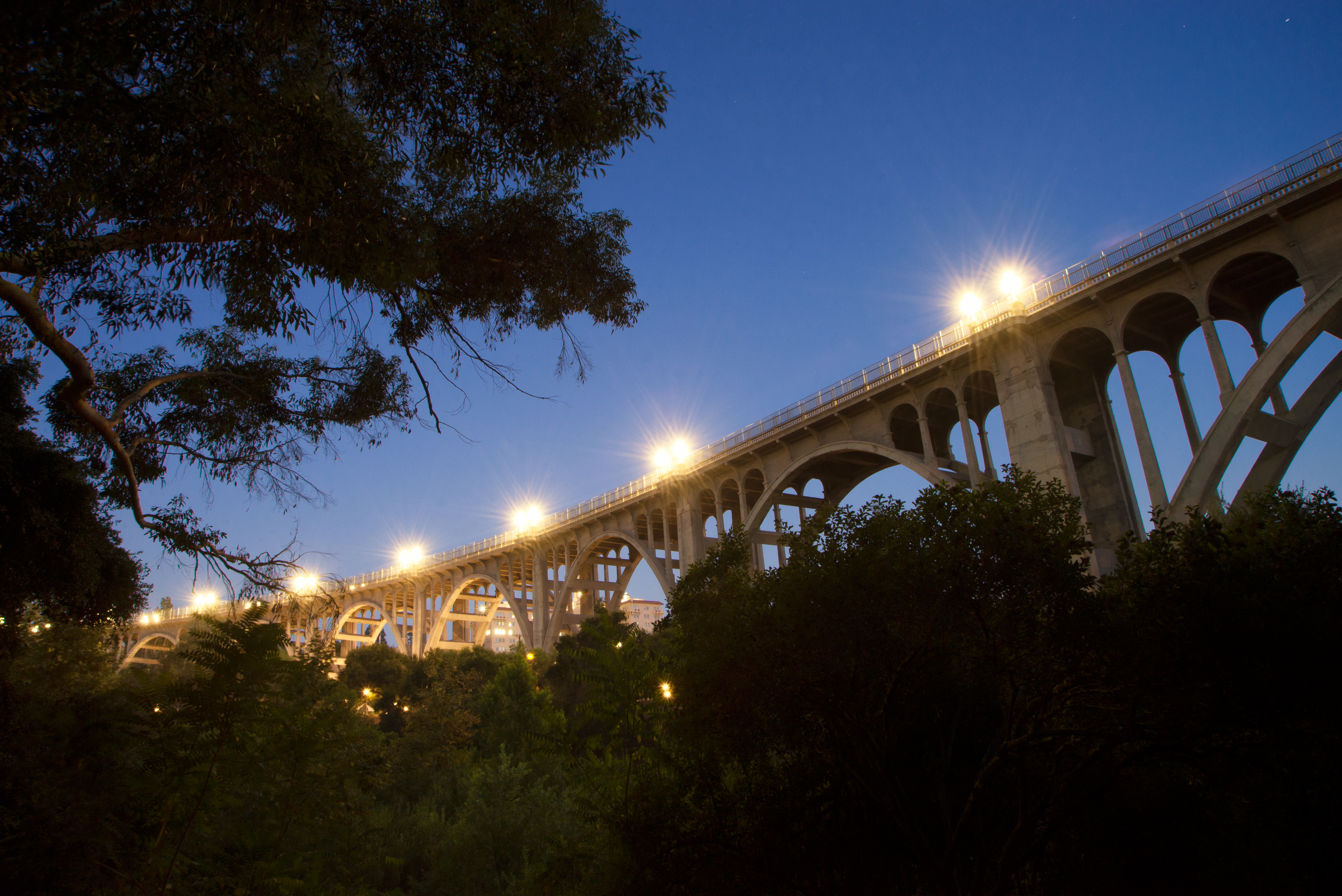
Colorado Street Bridge, 2020

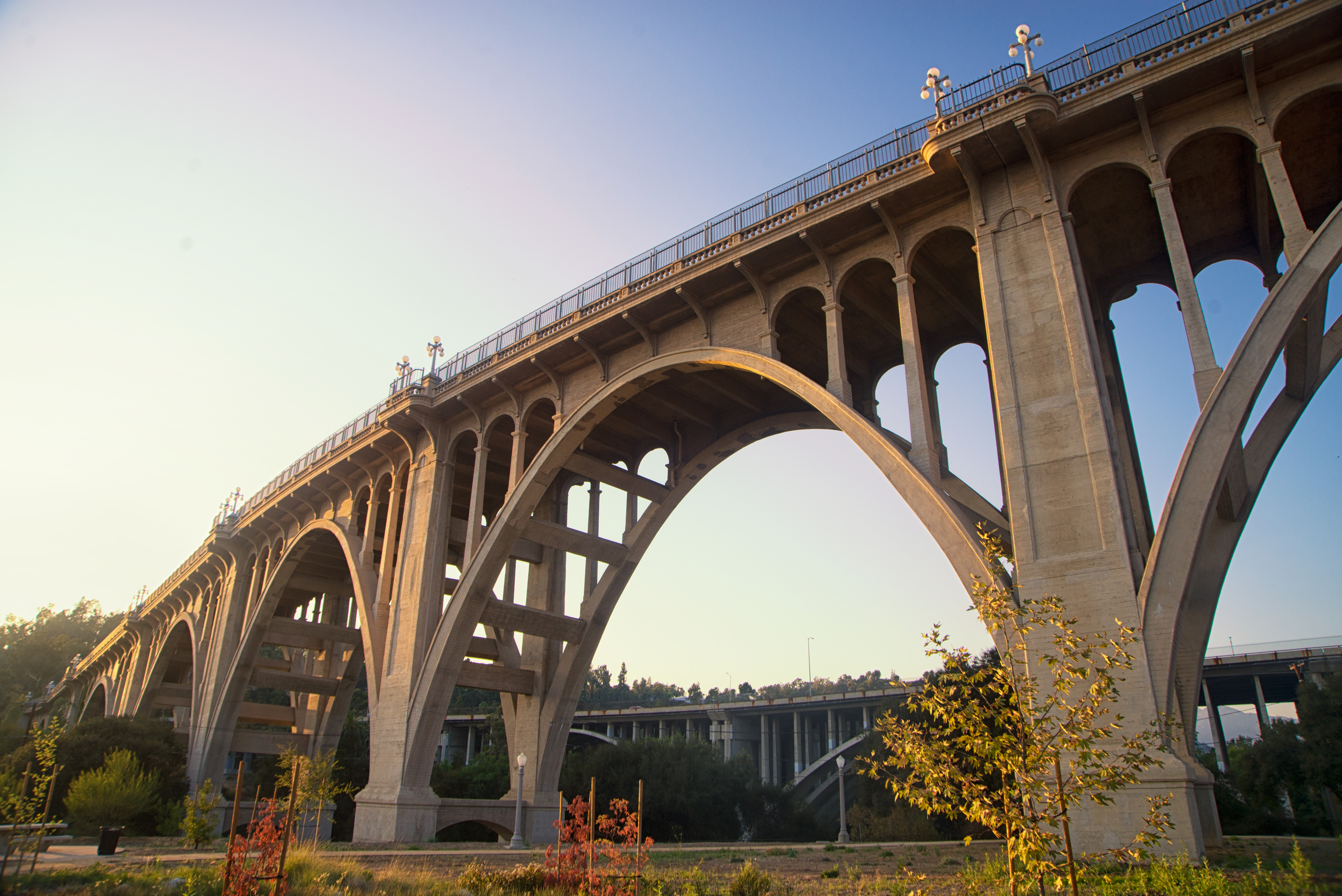
Colorado Street Bridge, 2020

== See also ==
- List of bridges documented by the Historic American Engineering Record in California
