= Errol Flynn filmography =

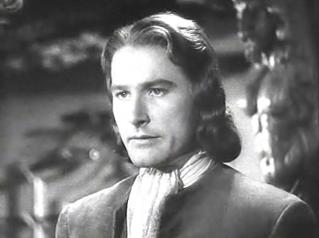
- Errol Flynn in Captain Blood (1935)
- Film: 66
- Television series: 4

The film appearances of movie actor Errol Flynn (1909–1959) are listed here, including his short films and one unfinished feature.

== Films ==
Year	Title	Director	Role	Notes
1933	In the Wake of the Bounty	Charles Chauvel	Fletcher Christian	Made in Australia; Never released theatrically in the United States, Australian Debut
1933	I Adore You	George King	Bit	Flynn had an unbilled bit part in this now lost film, English Debut
1935	Murder at Monte Carlo	Ralph Ince	Dyter	Filmed in England at Warner Bros. Teddington Studios; Never released in the United States; Now believed to be a lost film
1935	The Case of the Curious Bride	Michael Curtiz	Gregory Moxley	Flynn in a small, non-speaking role. The first of twelve films with director Michael Curtiz, Hollywood Debut
1935	Don't Bet on Blondes	Robert Florey	David Van Dusen	Flynn in a supporting role
1935	Captain Blood	Michael Curtiz	Peter Blood	Flynn's first leading role in Hollywood; Based on the novel by Rafael Sabatini; Previously filmed in 1924 with J. Warren Kerrigan in the Flynn role Flynn's first of eight films with Olivia de Havilland
1936	The Charge of the Light Brigade	Michael Curtiz	Capt. (later Major) Geoffrey Vickers	Filmed on location in Lone Pine, California
1937	Green Light	Frank Borzage	Dr. Newell Page	Flynn's first non-action lead role in Hollywood
1937	The Prince and the Pauper	William Keighley; William Dieterle (uncredited)	Miles Hendon	Based on the novel by Mark Twain
1937	Another Dawn	William Dieterle	Captain Denny Roark	
1937	The Perfect Specimen	Michael Curtiz	Gerald Beresford Wicks	Flynn's first comedy in Hollywood
1938	The Adventures of Robin Hood	Michael Curtiz; William Keighley	Sir Robin of Locksley (Robin Hood)	Technicolor
1938	Four's a Crowd	Michael Curtiz	Robert Kensington Lansford	
1938	The Sisters	Anatole Litvak	Frank Medlin	
1938	The Dawn Patrol	Edmund Goulding	Captain Courtney	Previously filmed in 1930 with Richard Barthelmess in the Flynn role
1939	Dodge City	Michael Curtiz	Wade Hatton	Technicolor; Flynn's first Western
1939	The Private Lives of Elizabeth and Essex	Michael Curtiz	Robert Devereux (Earl of Essex)	Technicolor
1940	Virginia City	Michael Curtiz	Capt. Kerry Bradford	Released in sepia tone Considered by some to be an unofficial sequel to Dodge City, however it bears no relation to that film whatsoever.
1940	The Sea Hawk	Michael Curtiz	Capt Geoffrey Thorpe	Released with sepiatone sequence
1940	Santa Fe Trail	Michael Curtiz	Jeb Stuart	Released in sepiatone
1941	Footsteps in the Dark	Lloyd Bacon	Francis Warren	
1941	Dive Bomber	Michael Curtiz	Lieutenant Douglas Lee	Technicolor; Flynn's last film with Michael Curtiz
1941	They Died with Their Boots On	Raoul Walsh	George Armstrong Custer	Flynn's first film with Raoul Walsh, Flynn's last film with Olivia de Havilland
1942	Desperate Journey	Raoul Walsh	Flight Lieutenant Terrence Forbes	The first time Flynn played an Australian on screen
1942	Gentleman Jim	Raoul Walsh	James J. Corbett	
1943	Edge of Darkness	Lewis Milestone	Gunnar Brogge	
1943	Northern Pursuit	Raoul Walsh	Steve Wagner	
1943	Thank Your Lucky Stars	David Butler	Himself	
1944	Uncertain Glory	Raoul Walsh	Jean Picard	Flynn co-produced the film
1945	Objective, Burma!	Raoul Walsh	Captain Nelson	
1945	San Antonio	David Butler; Robert Florey (uncredited); Raoul Walsh (uncredited)	Clay Hardin	Technicolor
1946	Never Say Goodbye	James V. Kern	Phil Gayley	
1947	Cry Wolf	Peter Godfrey	Mark Caldwell	Flynn's only venture into film noir
1947	Escape Me Never	Peter Godfrey	Sebastian Dubrok	Previously filmed in 1935 with Hugh Sinclair in Flynn's role
1947	The Lady from Shanghai	Orson Welles	Man in Background Outside of Cantina	Uncredited cameo
1948	Silver River	Raoul Walsh	Mike McComb	Flynn's last film with Raoul Walsh
1948	Adventures of Don Juan	Vincent Sherman	Don Juan de Marana	Technicolor
1949	That Forsyte Woman	Compton Bennett	Soames Forsyte	Technicolor; Flynn's first film outside Warner Bros. since 1935
1949	It's a Great Feeling	David Butler	Jeffrey Bushdinkle	Uncredited
1950	Montana	Ray Enright; Raoul Walsh (uncredited)	Morgan Lane	Technicolor
1950	Rocky Mountain	William Keighley	Lafe Barstow	Flynn's last western
1950	Kim	Victor Saville	Mahbub Ali, the Red Beard	Technicolor; Filmed on location in India and in Lone Pine, California
1951	Hello God	William Marshall	The Man on Anzio Beach	Never released in the United States
1951	Adventures of Captain Fabian	William Marshall; Robert Florey (uncredited)	Captain Michael Fabian	
1952	Mara Maru	Gordon Douglas	Gregory Mason	
1952	Against All Flags	George Sherman	Brian Hawke	Technicolor; Remade as The King's Pirate (1967) with Doug McClure in Flynn's role.
1953	The Master of Ballantrae	William Keighley	Jamie Durrisdeer	Technicolor; Filmed in England and in Italy (Palermo); Flynn's last film under his Warner Bros. contract
1954	Crossed Swords	Milton Krims; Vittorio Vassarotti	Renzo	Pathécolor; Filmed in Italy; Released in Europe under the title Il Maestro di Don Giovanni
1954	The Story of William Tell	Jack Cardiff	William Tell	CinemaScope; Filmed in Italy; Never completed
1955	Lilacs in the Spring	Herbert Wilcox	John Beaumont	Eastmancolor; Filmed in England; Released in the United States as Let's Make Up
1955	The Dark Avenger	Henry Levin	Prince Edward	CinemaScope; Eastman Color; Filmed in England; Released in the United States as The Warriors
1955	King's Rhapsody	Herbert Wilcox	King Richard	CinemaScope; Eastman Color; Filmed in England
1957	Istanbul	Joseph Pevney	James Brennan	CinemaScope; Technicolor; Previously filmed as Singapore (1947) with Fred MacMurray in Flynn's role.
1957	The Big Boodle	Richard Wilson	Ned Sherwood	Filmed on location in Cuba
1957	The Sun Also Rises	Henry King	Mike Campbell	CinemaScope; Deluxe color Based on the novel by Ernest Hemingway
1958	Too Much, Too Soon	Art Napoleon	John Barrymore	
1958	The Roots of Heaven	John Huston	Major Forsythe	CinemaScope; Deluxe color Filmed on location in French Equatorial Africa
1959	Cuban Rebel Girls	Barry Mahon	The American Correspondent	Filmed in Cuba; Posthumous release
1959	Cuban Story	Victor Pahlen	Himself	Filmed in Cuba; Posthumous release

== Television ==
Year	Title	Role	Notes
1956	Screen Directors' Playhouse: The Sword of Villon	François Villon	First TV appearance
1956	The Errol Flynn Theatre	Presenter 26 episodes	Filmed in England
1957	Playhouse 90	Captain Russell Bidlack	Episode: Without Incident
1959	Goodyear Theatre	Doc Boatwright	Episode: The Golden Shanty

== Short films ==
Year	Title	Role	Director	Notes
1935	A Dream Comes True	Himself	George Bilson	A behind-the-scenes look at the movie industry.
1935	Pirate Party on Catalina Isle	Himself	Alexander Van Horn	Technicolor
1938	Breakdowns of 1938	Himself		Outtakes from several movies, including The Adventures of Robin Hood
1938	For Auld Lang Syne	Himself		A short showing celebrities aiding the Will Rogers Memorial Fund
1943	Show Business at War	Himself	Louis De Rochemont	
1952	Cruise of the Zaca	Himself / narrator	Errol Flynn	Technicolor
1952	Deep Sea Fishing	Himself / narrator	Errol Flynn	Technicolor

== Unmade films ==
The following projects were announced for Errol Flynn but were not made:

- Danton (1936) based on Danton's Death and to be produced by Max Reinhardt and directed by William Dieterle
- The White Rajah (late 1930s) – based on the life of Sir James Brooke based on Flynn's own story
- The Romantic Adventure (1938) – a romantic comedy with Joan Blondell based on an original story by Jerry Wald and Maurice Leo
- The Outpost (1939) based on Caesar's Wife by Somerset Maugham starring Flynn and Geraldine Fitzgerald directed by Michael Curtiz
- Shanghai (1940) from a story by Somerset Maugham
- Jupiter Laughs (1940) from the play by A. J. Cronin
- The Life of Simón Bolívar (1939–40) – possibly with Bette Davis
- The Sea Devil (1942) – a remake of The Sea Beast which was adaptation of Moby Dick
- Ghosts Don't Leave Footprints (1941) – sequel to Footsteps in the Dark
- To the Last Man (early 1940s) – comedy with Alexis Smith
- The Devil, George and Rosie (1943) – from a story by John Collier to star Flynn, Ann Sheridan and Humphrey Bogart
- The Frontiersman (circa 1945) – an original western by Alan Le May about the beginning of a riverboat operation in the Mississippi to be produced by Flynn and Mark Hellinger with Raoul Walsh directing
- Stallion Road (1945), based on a novel, with Ida Lupino
- Target Japan (1945) with producer Jerry Wald and director Raoul Walsh about a B-29 bombing crew
- The Man Without Friends (1945) based on story by Margaret Eckhard about a man accused of the murder of his wife to be produced by Henry Blanke and adapted by Catherine Turney
- untitled adventure film "in the Frank Buck tradition" shot off the coast of Mexico produced by Flynn
- Thunder Valley (1946) – a Western written by James Webb and produced by Owen Crump
- General Crack (circa 1947) – remake of General Crack (1929) originally filmed starring John Barrymore
- Half Way House (circa 1947) – an "alpine thriller" by Frances Potter and Spencer Rice
- The Turquoise (circa 1948) with Claude Rains and Dorothy Malone based on the adventure novel by Anya Seton – set in the American southwest in the 1890s, written by Edmund North produced by William Jacobs
- The Candy Kid (1948) with producer Bill Jacobs – story of a gambler in the days of Diamond Jim Brady from a script by Borden Chase based on a magazine story by Michael MacDougall
- The Last of the Buccaneers (circa 1949) – a pirate movie based on a script by Flynn himself to be produced by Flynn, shot in technicolor with the star as a Robin Hood type pirate (not to be confused with the 1950 Paul Henreid film) – another source said this was to be about Bully Hayes and called The Last Buccaneer
- story of the female pirate Mary Burns with Greer Garson (circa 1949) (he and Garson also discussed doing a Broadway play together)
- The Man Who Cried (1950) – production with William Marshall described as a psychological thriller about the perfect crime which took place over four hours
- The Man from Sparta (1951) – movie to be shot in Italy about Spartacus
- The Bengal Tiger (1952)
- Fire Over Africa (1952)
- The Green Moss (1952) from a magazine serial by John Molloy to co-star Gordon Macrae directed by Roy del Ruth
- The Talisman from the novel by Sir Walter Scott (1953)
- Abdulla the King (1953) in the title role with Dawn Addams directed by Gregory Ratoff
- Dragonfly (1953) – proposed adventure film from producer John Champion set in the Far East with Flynn as an air force officer whose command is threatened with desertion.
- The White Witch of Rose Hall (1954) – to be made with Herbert Wilcox based on a Jamaican legend about a female plantation owner who was a witch and killed her husbands – to be produced by Barry Mahon – Flynn was still working on it in 1957, saying he wanted Bob Evans to star and Charles Marquis Warren to direct
- Lord Vanity (late 1950s) – with Robert Wagner
- Ten Days to Talara (1956) with the same director of The Big Boodle about an adventurer whose son is kidnapped
- untitled Debbie Reynolds project as her teetotal father (circa 1958)

=== Films made with other actors ===
Flynn was announced for the following movies which were made with other actors:

- Sylvia Scarlett (1935) – the part played by Brian Aherne
- Four Daughters (1937) – part played by Jeffrey Lynn
- The Adventures of Marco Polo (1938) – Flynn was wanted by original director William Wyler. The part eventually went to Gary Cooper.
- Captain Horatio Hornblower (announced in 1940) – eventually made in 1951 with Gregory Peck
- The Constant Nymph (1943) with Olivia de Havilland – part played by Charles Boyer
- Affectionately Yours (1941) – part played by Dennis Morgan
- In This Our Life (1942) – part played by George Brent
- Reap the Wild Wind (1942) – part played by John Wayne
- Mr. Skeffington (1944) – part played by Claude Rains
- Saratoga Trunk (1945) – part played by Gary Cooper
- One Last Fling (1946) – part played by Zachary Scott
- The Hucksters (1947) – part played by Clark Gable
- The Heiress (1948) – William Wyler reportedly wanted Flynn for the part played by Montgomery Clift
- Mr. Imperium (1951) with Greer Garson
- Carson City (1952) – announced for Flynn and John Wayne
- Dallas (1950) – part played by Gary Cooper
- King Solomon's Mines (1950) – Stewart Granger replaced him
- Ivanhoe (1952) – part played by Robert Taylor

== Box office rankings ==
At the height of his career, exhibitors voted Flynn among the leading stars in Britain, the US and Australia in various polls:

- 1937 – 11th (Australia)
- 1938 – 21st (US), 14th (Australia)
- 1939 – 8th (US), 7th (Britain)
- 1940 – 14th (US), 7th (Britain), 4th (territories outside Canada and US)
- 1941 – 14th (US)
- 1942 – 17th (US), 15th (internationally)
- 1943 – 17th (US)
- 1946 – 25th (US), 10th biggest Western star (Britain)
