= Templeton Crocker =

American patron and collector (1884–1948)

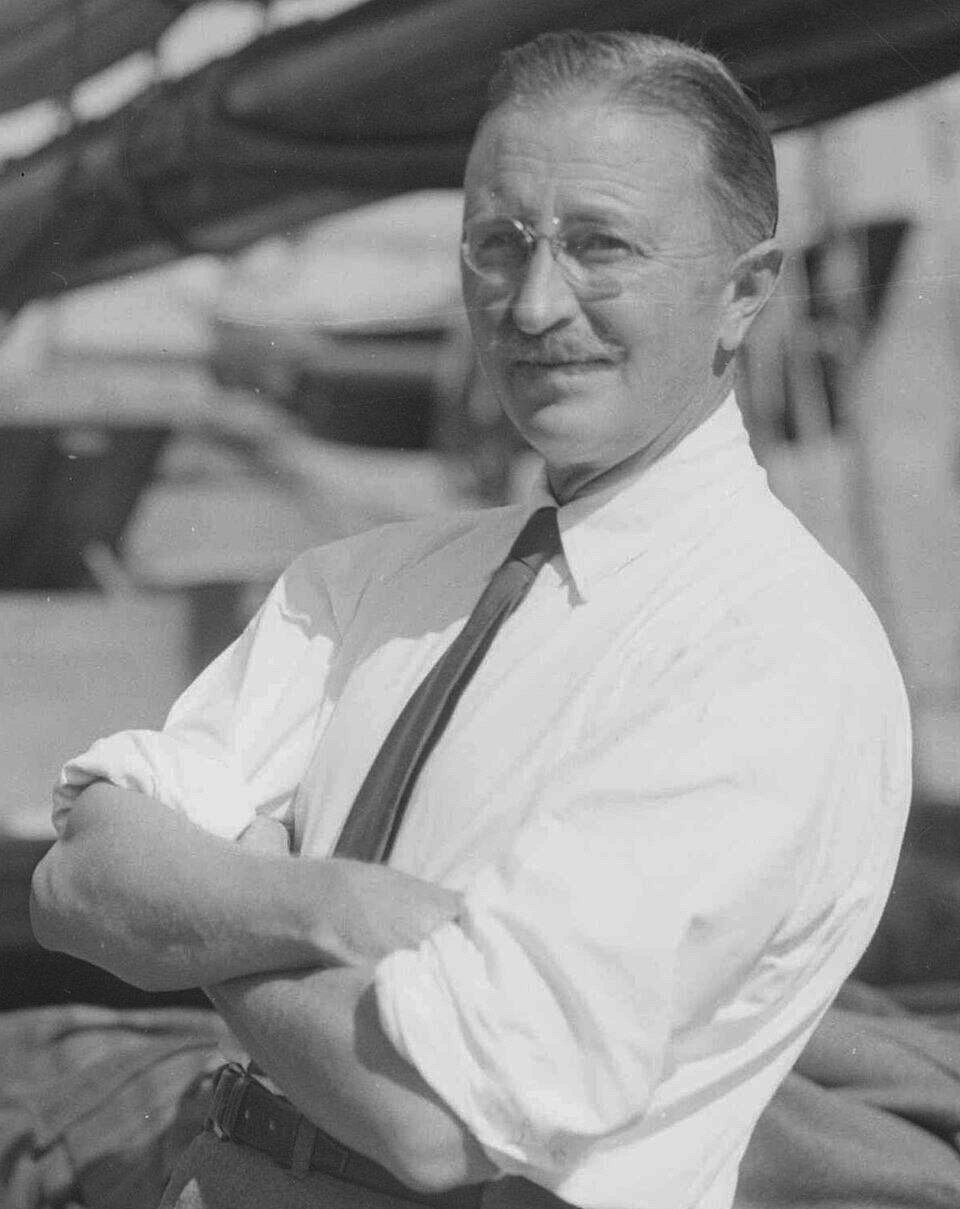
- Crocker in 1932
- Born: Charles Templeton Crocker; September 2, 1884; San Francisco, California, U.S.
- Died: December 12, 1948 (aged 64); San Francisco, California, U.S.
- Resting place: Cypress Lawn Memorial Park
- Spouse: Helene Irwin (m. 1911; div. 1927)
- Parent(s): Charles Frederick Crocker; Jennie Ella Marine Easton

Charles Templeton Crocker (September 2, 1884 – December 12, 1948) was an American philanthropist, art patron and scion of the Crocker family. He was a past president of the California Historical Society and a member of the board of directors for over twenty years. He also wrote the libretto to the first American opera that was produced in Europe; helped popularize French Art Deco in America; and funded and headed expeditions with the California Academy of Sciences and other academic institutions aboard his personal yacht Zaca. The town of Templeton is named after him.

== Life and family ==
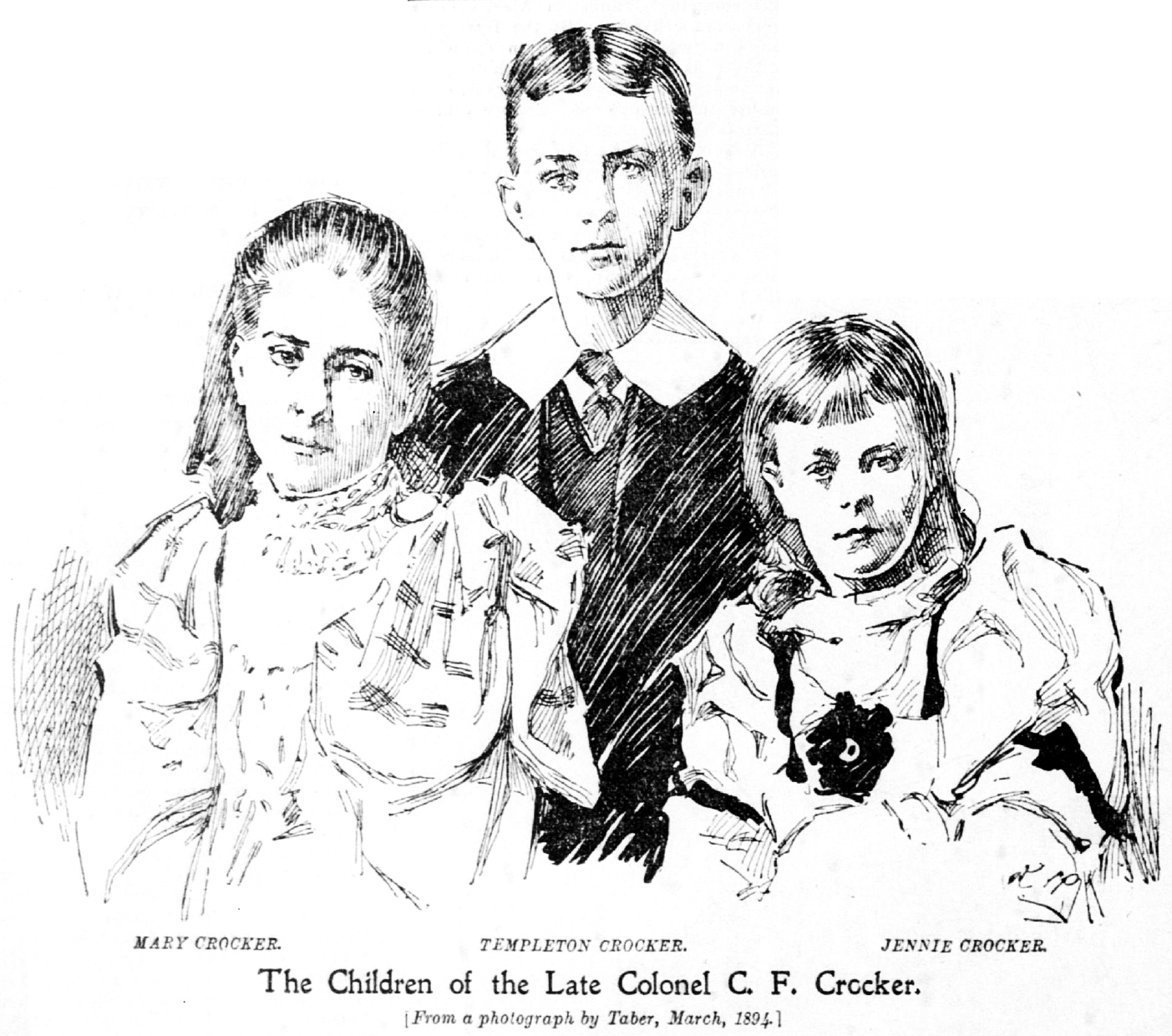
L-R: Mary, Templeton, and Jennie Crocker, 1897 illustration adapted from an 1894 photograph by I. W. Taber

Charles Templeton Crocker was born September 2, 1884, in San Francisco, California, the only son and second (of three) children born to Charles Frederick (Fred) & Jennie Crocker (née Easton); Templeton's paternal grandfather was Charles Crocker, one of the Big Four railroad magnates. Both parents died when he and his sisters were young: their mother died shortly after the birth of the youngest sister, Jennie, in 1887, and their father died in 1897. The three Crocker siblings continued to live in the family's Hillsborough estate Uplands with their maternal grandmother, Adeline Easton. Their parents had left them an $8 million fortune, which was put in trust and distributed to each in turn when they came of age; Mary, the eldest, inherited her share in 1899. Templeton survived significant injuries and illnesses when he was younger, including a grave fever when he was six, an accident involving a stair bannister a few months later, and fracturing both legs after being thrown by his horse when he was seventeen.

By the time Templeton received his $5 million share upon turning 21 years old in 1905, the siblings' collective inheritance had grown to $15 million with investments. Templeton and his younger sister Jennie received an additional $4 million inheritance in 1910 upon the death of their uncle George.

Templeton attended the Westminster School, graduating in 1903, and went on to attend Yale (graduating in 1908); Cole Porter was among his friends there. Upon his graduation, he returned to San Francisco and lived in the family's thirty-seven-room Italian villa on their 118-acre (48 ha) estate in Hillsborough. The three Crocker siblings had inherited the Uplands estate upon their father's death; following Mary's untimely death in 1905 and Jennie's purchase of the Tevis estate in 1910, the property became Templeton's sole possession.

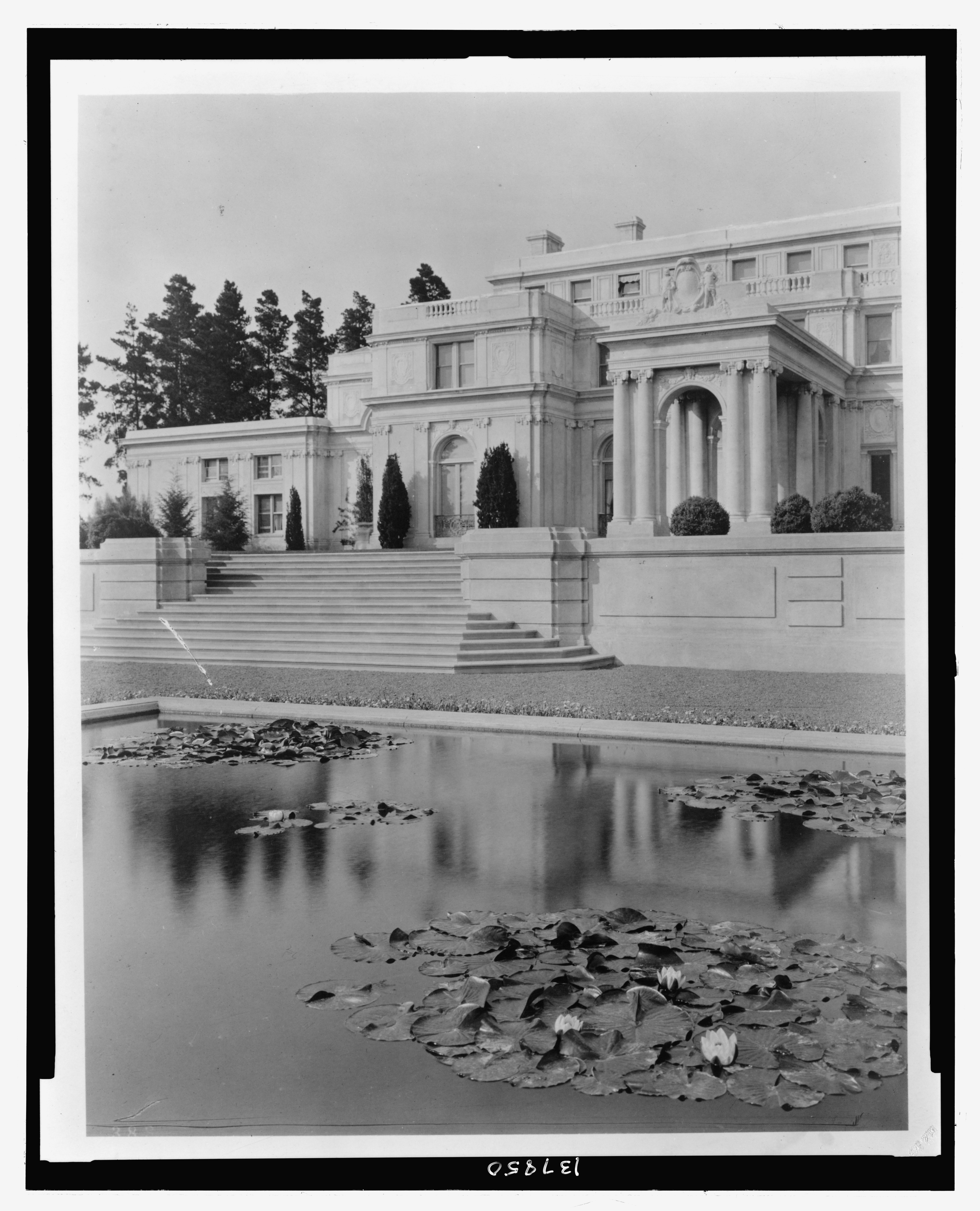
Uplands II, photographed by Frances Benjamin Johnston shortly after completion in 1917. The mansion is now the main building of the private Crystal Springs Uplands School.

Templeton married Helene Irwin, daughter of the Hawaiian sugar baron William G. Irwin, at the Irwin family home in San Francisco on February 28, 1911. At the time of their marriage, the couple's combined net worth was estimated at US$28,000,000 (equivalent to $967,500,000 in 2025). Shortly after they were married, Templeton hired noted architect Willis Polk to design a new mansion for the site as a wedding present for his wife. Work began on the new mansion, named Uplands II, in 1913 and was completed in 1917.

Outdoor scenes for the motion picture Gimme were filmed by Rupert Hughes at Uplands II in 1922; the salaries of the society women who served as extras and the rental fee for the grounds were donated to charity. Irwin and Crocker announced their intention to divorce in 1927, with Irwin alleging cruelty, long absences from home, and neglect; the divorce was finalized in 1928 and Crocker decamped to his new San Francisco apartment, selling the mansion in 1942 to Romie C. Jacks, the son of David Jacks, who popularized Monterey Jack cheese. Uplands II was temporarily rented in 1951 to a Soviet delegation, including Deputy Foreign Secretary Andrei Gromyko, who were attending the Japanese Peace Conference that year. Jennie Crocker repurchased Uplands II in 1956 for US$95,000 (equivalent to $1,130,000 in 2025) and assisted the Trustees of Crystal Springs School in acquiring it for Crystal Springs Uplands School, where it serves as the main building for the private high school. The mansion is one of three prominent examples of Beaux-Arts architecture in Hillsborough, along with Carolands and La Dolphine.

The original Uplands I was sold to C.J. Lindgren and moved to a new site approximately 350 yards (320 m) north from its original location in 1915. Reportedly, Lindgren was given the house for free, conditioned on its successful removal. It is still standing at 401 El Cerrito Avenue, near the intersection with Poett Road, albeit with significant alternations; when it was owned by George Randolph Hearst, who purchased it in 1927, he hired Julia Morgan to remodel it.

On December 12, 1948, Crocker died in his suite at the St. Francis Hotel in San Francisco after a long illness. After suffering a stroke, Crocker lived the last four years of his life at the hotel. Funeral services were held at St. Matthew's Episcopal Church in San Mateo, after which he was interred at Cypress Lawn Memorial Park.

=== Extended family ===
Templeton was the grandson of Charles Crocker, one of the four chief builders of the western portion of the Transcontinental Railroad. His uncles were banker and investor William H. Crocker, president of the Crocker Bank and George Crocker, second vice-president of the Southern Pacific Railroad.

His mother's family were also prominent citizens on the San Francisco Peninsula: his maternal grandparents, Ansel I. and Adeline Easton (née Mills) survived the sinking of the SS Central America off Cape Hatteras during their honeymoon in 1857. Adeline's brother Darius Ogden Mills, for whom the city of Millbrae is named, was once credited as California's richest citizen.

His brother-in-law, via marriage to his eldest sister Mary, was Francis Burton Harrison. The first husband of his younger sister Jennie was national tennis champion Malcolm Whitman; after their divorce, Jennie married businessman Robert Henderson. Templeton's uncle (his mother's brother) Ansel Mills Easton was married to Louise (née Adams); Louise's brother Charles Adams was the father of famed photographer Ansel Easton Adams, making Ansel Adams a cousin by marriage.

One cousin was the mystic, princess and author Aimee Crocker. His great uncle Edwin B. Crocker built Sacramento's Crocker Art Museum.

Crocker family tree

Nancy Crocker; 1792–1854	Isaac Crocker; 1781–1856
Mary Norton; 1821–47	Edwin B. Crocker; 1818–75	Margaret Rhodes; 1822–1901	Mary Ann Deming; 1827–89	Charles Crocker; 1822–88	Clarke Crocker (Note: Married to Julia A Kimball (1830–1901)); 1827–90	Henry Smith Crocker (Note: Married to Clara Ellen Swinerton (1845–1910)) (Note: At least one son, Charles Henry (1865–1935)) (Note: a San Francisco publisher of maps and Crocker-Langley San Francisco city directories and a railroad investor); 1832–1904
Mary Norton Crocker; 1846–1923	[two marriages]	Edwin Clark Crocker; 1856–56	Nellie Margaret Crocker; 1856–79	Aimée Isabella Crocker; 1864–1941	[five marriages]	Henry J. Crocker (Note: Married to Mary Virginia Ives (1863–1929)) (Note: Multiple siblings (not shown)); 1861–1912
Kate Eugenie Crocker; 1854–74	James O.B. Gunn; 1846–1923	Jennie Louise Crocker; 1860–1939	Jacob Sloat Fassett; 1853–1924
[multiple children] (Note: Including actress Kate McComb (1871–1959), from Mary Crocker's first marriage to Charles L. Scudder.)	[multiple children]	[multiple children]
Emily Elizabeth Crocker; 1853–53	Emma Hanchett; 1855–1904	George Crocker; 1856–1909	Harriet Valentine Crocker; 1859–1935	Charles Beatty Alexander (Note: Uncle of Eleanor Butler Roosevelt (1888–1960)); 1849–1927
Jennie Easton (Note: Niece of Darius Ogden Mills (1825–1910)); 1858–87	Charles Frederick Crocker; 1854–97	Francis Crocker; 1858–62	Ethel Sperry; 1861–1934	William Henry Crocker
Mary Crocker; 1881–1905	Francis Burton Harrison; 1873–1957	Harriet Crocker Alexander; 1888–1972	Winthrop W. Aldrich; 1885–1974	[multiple children]
Helene Irwin (Note: Daughter of William G. Irwin (1843–1914)); 1887–1966	Charles Templeton Crocker; 1884–1948	Janetta Alexander; 1890–1973	Arnold Whitridge; 1892–1989	Harry Crocker; 1893–1958
Malcolm Whitman; 1877–1932	Jennie Adeline Crocker; 1887–1974	Robert Henderson; 1877–1940	Mary Crocker Alexander; 1895–1986	Sheldon Whitehouse; 1883–1965
[multiple children]	[multiple children]	[one child]	[multiple children]	[multiple children]	[multiple children] (Note: Including Ambassador Charles S. Whitehouse (1921–2001), father of US Senator Sheldon Whitehouse (1955–); and Sylvia Whitehouse (1930–), wife of Ambassador Robert O. Blake (1921–2015) and mother of Ambassador Robert O. Blake Jr. (1957–).)

Notes

Sources
- "Crocker Family Tree". San Mateo County Historical Association.

== Interests ==
In 1910, when the Town of Hillsborough was considering articles of incorporation, Templeton Crocker was advanced as a candidate for its first mayor.

=== Librettist ===
A few years later, the multi-faceted multi-millionaire made history as a librettist. He wrote the lyrics for an opera entitled The Land of Happiness, a Chinese fantasy-extravaganza set to music by composer (and Southern Pacific attorney) Joseph Redding which premiered on August 4, 1917, at the Bohemian Grove. After the success of this opera, Crocker was encouraged to mount an ambitious, professional production. While visiting Bohemian Grove in 1921, the well-known soprano Mary Garden accepted the opera with the intention to produce it in Chicago, but it would take several more years to make its public debut.

After the end of World War I, Crocker and Redding visited Paris in search of talent to design and produce his opera, by then renamed to Fay-Yen-Fah. They created a partnership with Russian impresario Sergei Diaghilev, founder of the Ballets Russes. Diaghilev hired a youthful George Balanchine as choreographer. Dancers included legends Ninette de Valois and Alexadra Danilva. The brilliant dancer/painter Hubert Julian "Jay" Stowitts, aka “America’s First Ambassador of International Culture,” was employed to create authentic and sumptuous costumes and sets. The research and development phase of the project took three full years.

In February 1925, Crocker and Redding traveled to Monte Carlo where their opera had its European premiere at the Opéra de Monte Carlo. It was the first time in the history of music that a full-length opera composed by an American, on a libretto written by an American, was produced in Europe.

In mid-January 1926, Gaetano Merola, founding director of the San Francisco Opera Company, gave Fay-Yen-Fah its American debut at the Columbia Theater, which also marked the start of the 1926 opera season in San Francisco. San Francisco society appeared in large numbers, making the performance a dazzling success. Redding and Crocker received the Ribbon of the Legion of Honor from France for the opera in 1926. A music critic from the San Francisco Chronicle praised Crocker and Redding's accomplishment, calling the opera “a refreshing breeze in a hothouse of artificiality.”

Crocker brought it back to Monte Carlo in 1932 with Balanchine and Stowitts and danseuse Tamara Toumanova in the principal role. It was revived in the spring of 2009, again in Monte Carlo, for a special performance using the original costumes. Two hundred members of the Bohemian Club came to the opening.

=== California Historical Society ===
Crocker collected rare books and in 1922 refounded the California Historical Society; at the time there were few collectors of books relating to California history and he amassed what was considered "the best in private hands" by 1923. He convened a luncheon on February 13, 1922, for a small group who agreed to restart the Society, which had, until then, an intermittent history since it was first mentioned in 1852. He served as the Society's first president and provided generous financial support over its first twenty years until its membership had grown sufficiently to cover its costs. Henry R. Wagner credited Crocker's "social position and wealth" with the Society's success; in addition, he donated his entire book collection to the Society in 1940 after an off-hand suggestion.

=== Art Deco enthusiast ===
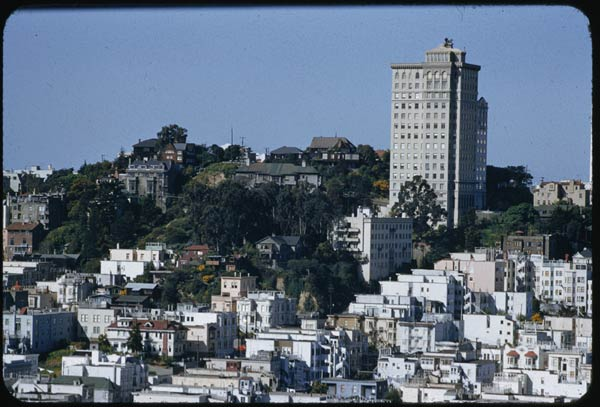
Russian Hill from Telegraph Hill in 1955; at the time, 945 Green was the tallest and most prominent building pictured. Templeton Crocker owned the penthouse apartment.

Templeton was one of the millions of fair-goers who became enamored with the geometrical motifs of Art Deco at the Paris Exposition of 1925. He would return to France a few years later to commission fashionable furnishings and objects for his penthouse apartment in the Russian Hill neighborhood of San Francisco. The prominent apartment building at 945 Green Street, which was in the Italianate style, and completed in 1928, was part of a notable "spite war"; when the 12-storey building at 947 Green had been completed a few years earlier, it spoiled the views from an older property at 973 Green, and the owners of 973 retaliated by constructing the 15-storey 945 to completely obstruct the views east from 947.

Templeton hired none other than Jean-Michel Frank, Pierre Legrain, Jean Dunand and Madame Lipska to execute the decor for his modernist apartment. French Art Deco at this level was rare in the United States at the time and rarer still in the hills of San Francisco. Crocker ordered wall reliefs, screens, furniture and accessories — some 400 objects in all. Dunand, still widely considered the most important designer of French Art Deco, was charged with finishing Crocker's bedroom, dining room, and breakfast room. The Crocker/Dunand collaboration was ground breaking.

Following his 1928 divorce, Crocker moved into a luxury apartment with longtime friend and valet-butler Thomas Thomasser. The apartment quickly became the talk of the city's social elite.Vogue Magazine declared in 1929 that it was, “perhaps the most beautiful apartment in the world.” It was the French master's most important commission in the United States and one of the earliest luxury apartments in America completed in the modern style. Templeton made a sizeable mark in art history as an early innovator in bringing the French Art Deco movement to the U.S.

After Crocker's death in 1948, the apartment was maintained as it had been during his life. Eventually, his heirs dismantled the apartment and sold off the furnishings, and when the apartment itself was sold in 1999, the decorative wall panels were removed. The breakfast room panels (by Dunand) were acquired by the jeweler Fred Leighton, who used them in his VIP salon and viewing room; they were subsequently exhibited by Maison Gerard at the Winter Antiques Show in 2013–14. Most of the bedroom furniture has since been donated to the Metropolitan Museum of Art; however, the bedroom panels are believed to be lost.

==== St. Francis Hotel ====
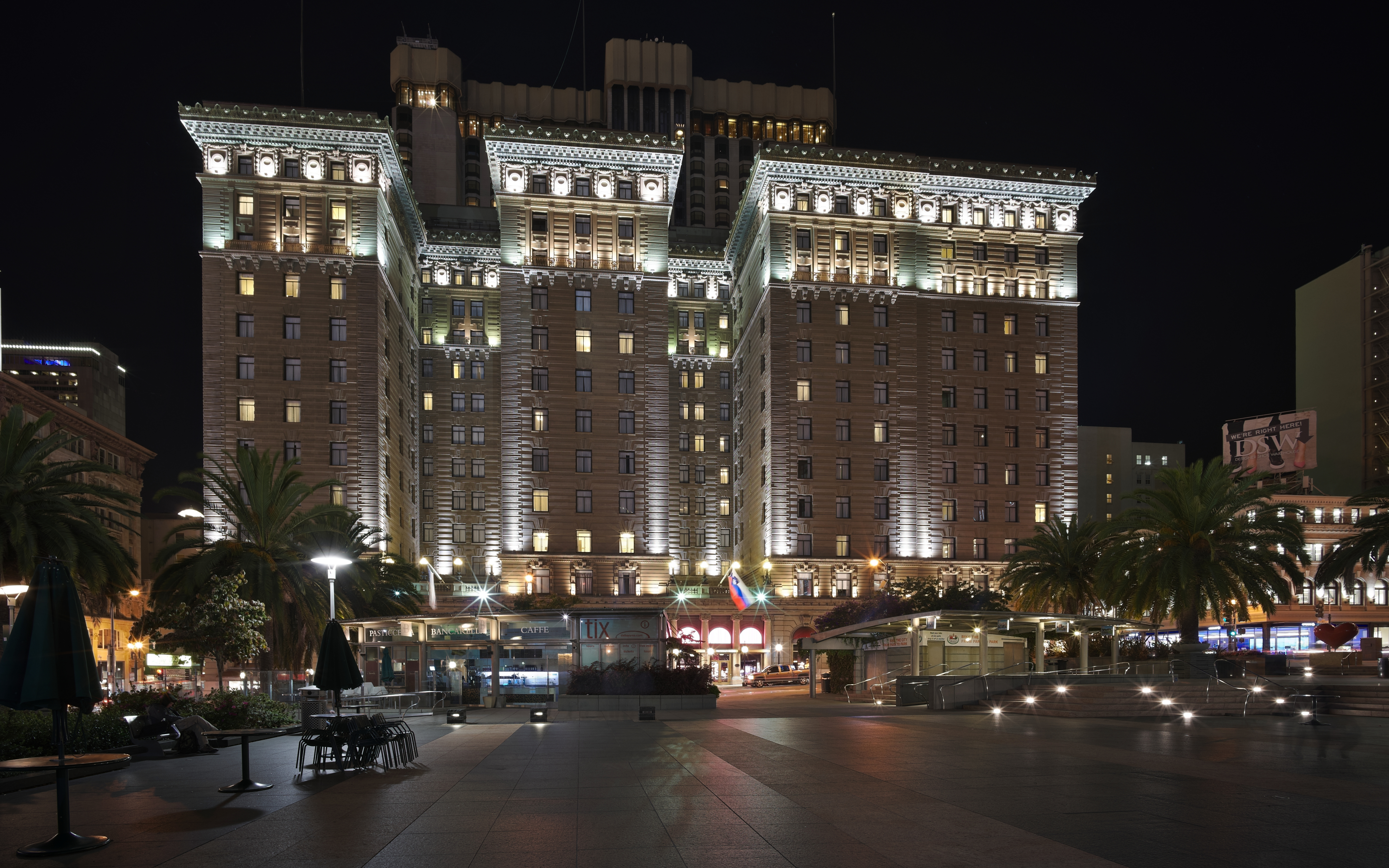
The original south wings (L) and added double-width north wing (R) of the St. Francis Hotel, photographed in 2016 overlooking Union Square

Templeton devoted himself intermittently to the management of the St. Francis Hotel on Union Square, which the Crocker family financed and built just before the Earthquake. Crocker and his sister Jennie deeded the land for the new north wing in 1912; Templeton himself was credited with redesigning the double-width north wing in 1909 after the original extension was criticized strongly.

After Dan London became the manager of the St. Francis in 1937, he, Crocker, and Crocker's nephew decided to hire brilliant San Francisco architect Timothy Pflueger to turn the existing ground-level restaurant into a sleek and curvaceous Art Deco lounge. The resulting "Patent Leather Room" was unveiled in 1939, with furniture finished in patent leather; however, the press and public dubbed it "Coffin Corner" or "The Black Hole". Ansel Adams was hired to take publicity shots. The Crockers sold their interest in the St. Francis in 1944 to a group led by Benjamin Swig and the Patent Leather Room was replaced by the "Terrace Room" in 1953.

=== Voyages aboard Zaca ===
Crocker served in the Naval Reserve, sailing on USS Idaho as an ensign in 1921; at the time he was thought to be the wealthiest man in the Navy. When he died in 1948, he held the rank of Commander in the Reserve.

After his childless marriage failed, Crocker lived an increasingly alternative, Bohemian lifestyle and indulged in numerous flights of fancy. In the late 1920s, Crocker commissioned Garland Rotch to design a two-masted, 118-foot (36 m)-long, black-hulled schooner, on the lines of the famed Bluenose. The boat was constructed by the Nunes Brothers Boatyard in Sausalito. Her galley and interior furnishings were the finest in pleasure craft equipment and she had a considerable spread of canvas. She was christened Zaca, a Native American word which means “Peace”, on April 12, 1930 by Academy Award winner Marie Dressler; one account reported the champagne bottle missed the boat and the christening ceremony was carried out after she was launched. Her maiden voyage was to Ensenada, departing on May 8, but the party was delayed for repairs to a propeller shaft.

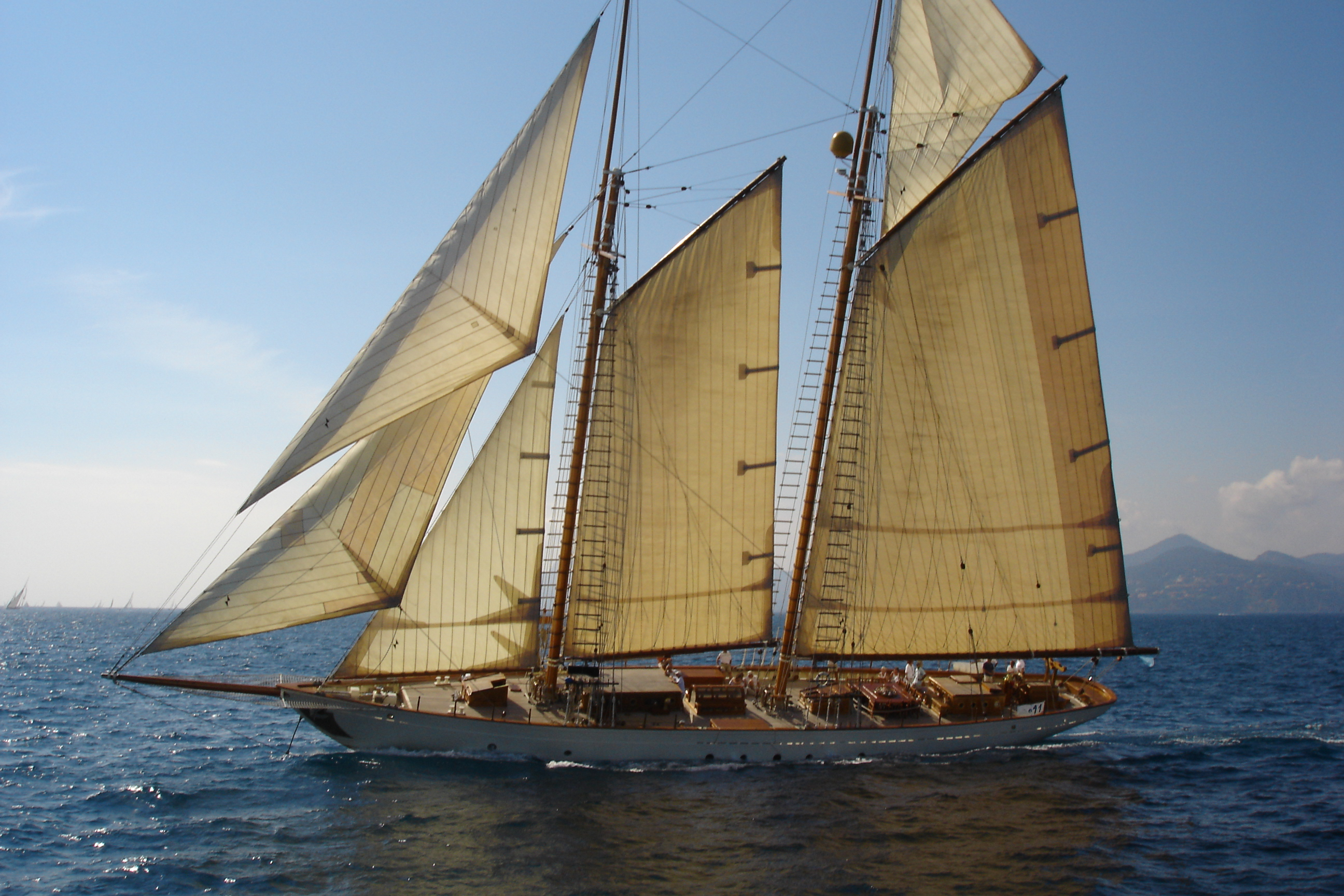
Zaca, photographed in 2006

The yacht provided Crocker with private accommodations and had sleeping capacity for 18 people. Its staterooms incorporated Art Deco design elements and used imported woods, including Alaskan cedar beams and teak and primavera panels. The yacht was equipped with two 120-horsepower (89 kW) diesel engines for auxiliary propulsion and four 5-kW electric generators. The generators powered onboard equipment, including a refrigerator and a distiller capable of producing approximately 50 US gallons (190 L; 42 imp gal) of freshwater per day. The yacht's total cost was reportedly US$300,000, consisting of $200,000 for construction and $100,000 for the interior and fittings. This amount is equivalent to approximately $5.78 million in 2025. Chief engineer Garth Basford later recalled the cost as $450,000.

==== Global circumnavigation, 1930–31 ====
Garland Rotch was Zaca's first captain. With Rotch and a crew of 8, Templeton sailed his yacht around the world covering 27,490 miles (44,240 km) and calling at 50 ports including Marquesas, Tahiti, Cook Islands, Pago Pago, Trobriands, Bali, Java, Singapore, Ceylon, Aden, Arabia, Egypt, Malta, Cannes, Teneriffe, Puerto Rico, Panama, Guatemala, Manzanillo, and Ensenada. The voyage departed on June 7, 1930, and returned to San Francisco on May 27, 1931. It was the first time a private yacht circumnavigated the globe from the West Coast. Crocker sailed smiling seas. The weather was perfect with only 43 hours of gale in the Mediterranean. “It must have been the most perfect yachting adventure that anyone ever had,” Crocker said. In 1933, Templeton wrote a narrative of his one-year journey cruising around the world in his grand yacht under the title The Cruise of the Zaca.

==== Scientific expeditions, 1931–38 ====
Scientific expeditions aboard Zaca
Dates	Destination(s)	Sponsor	Refs.
Oct 31, 1931–Nov 20, 1931	Mexico and Guadalupe Island	California Academy of Sciences	
Mar 10, 1932–Sep 1, 1932	Galápagos and Revillagigedo Islands	California Academy of Sciences	
Mar 3, 1933–Sep 1933	Western Polynesian and Melanesian Islands (including Santa Cruz, Solomons, Palmyra)	Bishop Museum	
Sep 15, 1934–Apr 16, 1935	Pacific Expedition (South Pacific and Peru, including Marquesas, Tuamotus, Galápagos, Chinchas, Easter Island, Pitcairn Island)	American Museum of Natural History	
Mar 16, 1936–May 28, 1936	Clarion Island, Cape San Lucas, Gulf of California, and Baja California Peninsula	New York Zoological Society	
Aug 18, 1936–Jan 17, 1937	Pacific Expedition (including Hawaii, Tongareva, American and British Samoa, Pago Pago, Apia)	American Museum of Natural History	
Nov 2, 1937–Apr 1938	Eastern Pacific Zaca Expedition (Guadalupe, San Benito, Cedros Islands; Pacific bays of Mexico, El Salvador, Nicaragua, Costa Rica, Panama, and Columbia)	New York Zoological Society	

After the globe spanning odyssey, the “Commodore,” as Crocker insisted on being called while at sea, ordered the yacht transformed into a floating laboratory for scientific expeditions. The yacht lost completely the appearance of a pleasure craft. Four temperature controlled tanks with running sea water were installed on her decks to bring back live fish. Six voyages in all between 1932 and 1938 transported ichthyologists, ornithologists, anthropologists, zoologists, botanists, and photographers from the California Academy of Sciences, the American Museum of Natural History, the New York Zoological Society and other academic institutions.

During an expedition to the Galápagos Islands for the California Academy of Sciences in 1932, Crocker and crew explored some of the previously untouched areas in the interior of several islands. Together they compiled collections of 400 stuffed or frozen birds, 3,000 plant specimens and 331 live fish. Artist Toshio Asaeda painted over 300 water colors of marine and terrestrial life and took over 1,400 photographs. Academy officials declared the expedition of great and permanent value to science. The perpetually tanned Templeton described the journey as “full of adventures,” and promptly offered to host a follow-up expedition that would pass through the Galápagos in 1934 on its way to Polynesia.

One species of finch not known since the time of Charles Darwin and supposed to be extinct was found to have survived on some of the islands. The birds of these islands were of exceptional interest, not only because of their many remarkable peculiarities, but because the study of them was largely responsible for the formulation of Darwin's theory of evolution.

The most important single accomplishment of the expeditions according to some was the penetration of Indefatigable (now Santa Cruz) Island and the first recorded ascent of its main volcano, accomplished on May 9, 1932. The challenge was not one of delicate mountaineering technique, as it only rose to an elevation of 2,690 feet (820 m), it was a matter of perseverance and endurance in fighting through tangles of upland rain forests, dense thickets of dark green mangroves, and a most extraordinary forest of 20–30 feet cactuses. The mountain was named after Crocker in honor of his conquest of that peak.

Crocker crisscrossed the Pacific Ocean from California to Asia and from the Arctic to Antarctica contributing much to the world of science. A new species of sea snake, found while exploring a brackish lake on Rennell Island, was named Laticauda crockeri after Templeton Crocker following his 1933 expedition to Western Polynesian and Melanesian Islands.

In 1934–1935, Crocker went on a sea borne investigatory enterprise with Harry L. Shapiro, anthropologist extraordinaire. Shapiro set out to measure mixed-race islanders, including the descendants of the HMS Bounty mutineers on Pitcairn Island. The study came to influence U.S. racial thought, adding impetus to the condemnation of racism in science.

Crocker went on two oceanic adventures along the Pacific Coast from Baja California to Columbia with William Beebe, renowned naturalist, marine biologist and world deep sea record holder. Beebe described his two expeditions on board Zaca in his books Zaca Venture (1936 expedition) and The Book of Bays (1937–38), in which he emphasized his concern for threatened habitats and his dismay at human interference with ecosystems.

Scholars accompanying Templeton determined that the Commodore was troubled with an eccentric and compulsive personality. He was indeed a complex character. Templeton grew up pampered, in an exceedingly wealthy family. He had a scenic town in California's wine county named after him at aged two. Templeton, however, suffered the loss of both parents by aged ten and thereafter struggled to feel worthy of his great fortune. The victim of intense mood swings and prone to alcoholic binges, Crocker could be both a generous and entertaining host and a demanding Captain Bligh. “It is curious,” Shapiro observed, “that so introspective a man with ultra-sensitive feelings should be so callous about inflicting torture on others.”

William Beebe, in spite of some tensions, dedicated one book to Crocker: “Not only must Mr. Crocker be given full credit for the inception and carrying out of the expedition and for the constant care that he took to see that every wish of ours was provided for, but especial thanks are due to him for his active part in capturing, sorting, labeling and preserving specimens, thousands of which passed through his hands.”

==== World War II and Errol Flynn ====
Crocker sold Zaca to the United States Navy on June 12, 1942, after World War II broke out; she was again converted, this time for military use. The refit took a week and added anti-aircraft machine guns; by June 19, she was stationed off the California coast to patrol for enemy ships and rescue downed pilots. Zaca was decommissioned on October 6, 1944, stored at Treasure Island, and stricken on November 13, 1944.

After the war, the dismasted schooner was sold to Joseph Rosenburg in June 1945 for $13,350, who sold her on to motion picture actor Errol Flynn in 1946 for US$40,000 (equivalent to $660,000 in 2025). Flynn allegedly sailed her with “full cargos of passionate women.” Zaca became the true love of his life. She is featured prominently in the 1947 Orson Welles film The Lady from Shanghai. A documentary short film, Cruise of the Zaca, which features Errol Flynn aboard his vessel, was made in 1952. Press reports referred to the storied vessel as “the sexiest yacht in the world.”

Flynn died in 1959 while arranging for the sale of Zaca in Vancouver, British Columbia to cover debts; she was abandoned in Mallorca and slowly deteriorated into a rotting hulk, passing between several disinterested owners, including Flynn's widow Patrice Wymore and Freddie Tinsley, who sailed the decrepit Zaca to Cannes in 1965. She eventually sank in 1988 while berthed in Beaulieu-sur-Mer. In 1991, she was acquired by Roberto Memmo and refloated; her structural restoration was completed in 1992 at Saint-Mandrier-sur-Mer and her interior restoration was completed in 1994 at Port Fontvieille in Monaco. Currently, she sails occasionally from her home port in Monaco.

== Taxon named in his honor ==
- The mote sculpin, Normanichthys crockeri H. W. Clark, 1937, also known as the barehead scorpionfish, is a ray-finned fish, the only member of the monotypic genus Normanichthys, family Normanichthyidae and suborder Normanichthyiodei.
