= The Golden Shanty =

The Golden Shanty may refer to:

- The Golden Shanty (short story), an 1887 short story by Edward Dyson
- The Golden Shanty (Goodyear Theatre), a 1959 episode of the TV series Goodyear Theatre, based on the short story
