= Errol Flynn (disambiguation) =

Errol Flynn (1909–1959) was a leading film actor.

Errol Flynn may also refer to:

- Errol Flynn (album), 1989 album by the Dogs D'Amour
- Errol Flynns, the Detroit street gang
- Errol Flynn Filmhouse, former name of a theatre in the Royal & Derngate theatre complex
- The Errol Flynn Theatre, anthology series presented by and starring Errol Flynn

== See also ==
- Errol Flynn filmography
- My Days with Errol Flynn, autobiographical book by Buster Wiles
- My Wicked, Wicked Ways: The Legend of Errol Flynn, 1985 American TV movie
