= Nora Eddington =

American actress and socialite (1924–2001)

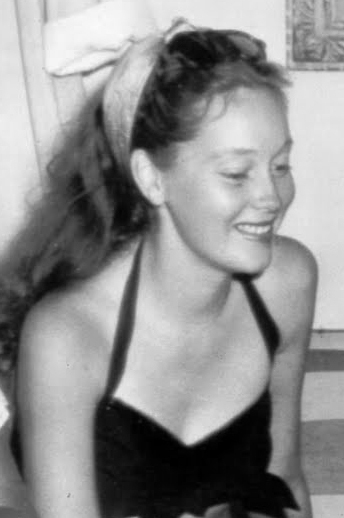
- Eddington aboard the Zaca during filming of The Lady from Shanghai, 1946
- Born: February 25, 1924; Chicago, Illinois, U.S.
- Died: April 10, 2001 (aged 77); Glendale, California, U.S.
- Resting place: Westwood Village Memorial Park Cemetery
- Occupations: Actress, socialite
- Spouses: Errol Flynn (m. 1944; div. 1949) Dick Haymes (m. 1949; div. 1953) Richard Black (m. 1964, divorced)
- Children: 3
- Relatives: Sean Flynn (grandson)

Nora Eddington (February 25, 1924 – April 10, 2001) was an American actress and socialite. She was best known as the second wife of actor Errol Flynn. Eddington appeared in several minor film roles.

== Background and early life ==
Born in Chicago, Illinois in 1924, the daughter of Jack Eddington of the Los Angeles County Sheriff's Department, Nora Eddington was nineteen when she met Errol Flynn in February 1943 – at the time, she was working at the courthouse where Flynn's notorious 1943 trial for statutory rape was taking place. Flynn was acquitted and they were married in 1944 in Mexico. Their daughter, Deirdre, was born on January 10, 1945. By the time their second daughter, Rory, was born in March 1947, their marriage was already essentially over. The couple were divorced in 1949, but parted on fairly amicable terms, with Eddington (then Eddington Flynn) given custody of the children.

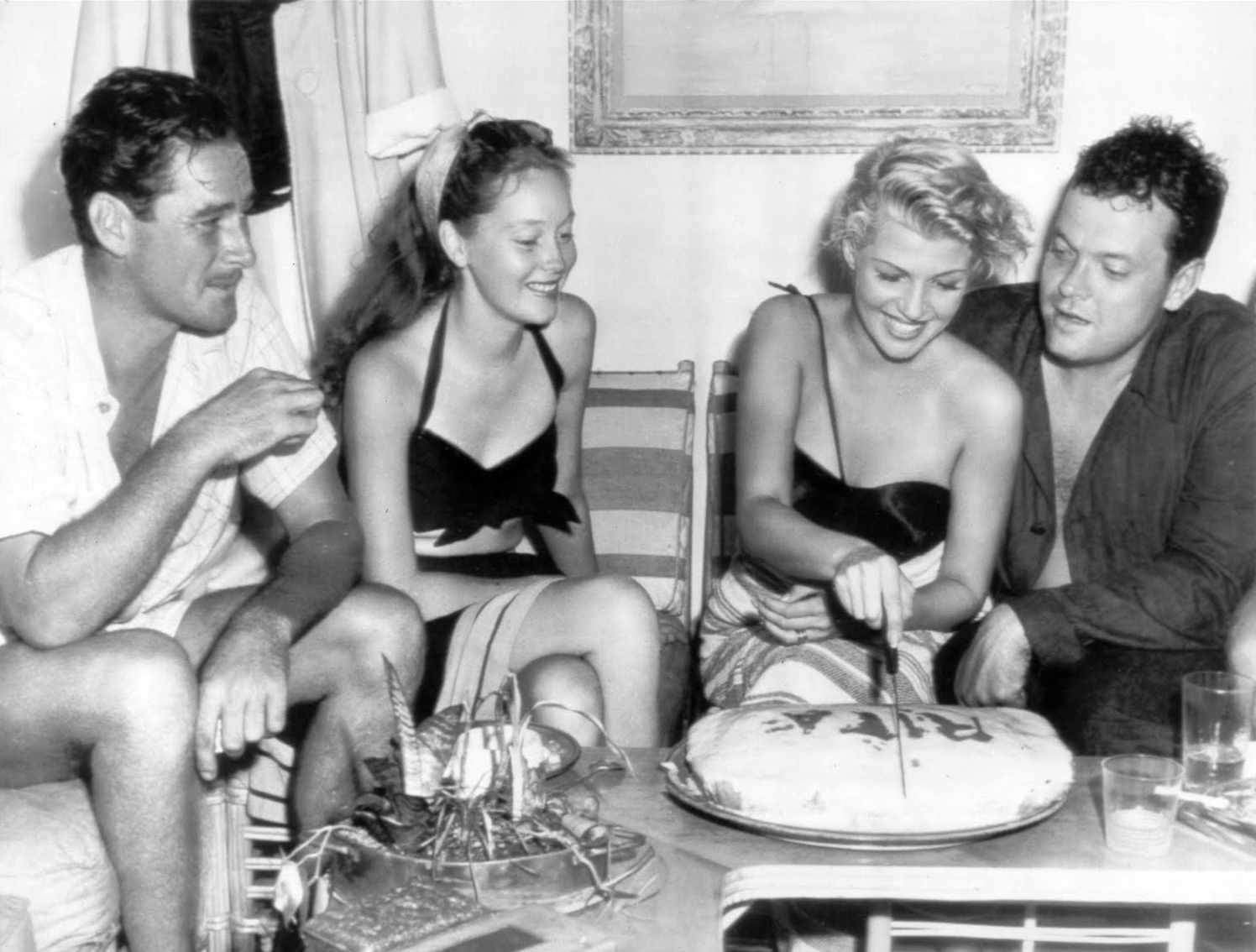
Aboard the Zaca during filming of The Lady from Shanghai, Errol Flynn, Nora Eddington, Rita Hayworth and Orson Welles celebrate Hayworth's birthday (October 1946)

Shortly after the divorce she married singer Dick Haymes, on July 17, 1949. She and Haymes had been having an affair for some time, a fact which became public knowledge by way of the gossip columns. Her marriage to Haymes, during which she suffered a miscarriage, lasted four years, a period which Haymes later characterized in an unpublished autobiography as "not a Dick Haymes marriage". After divorcing Haymes she married Richard Black, a marriage which lasted for most of the rest of her life – they had a son named Kevin, who died from leukemia at the age of 10. Richard and Nora Black divorced sometime before her death.

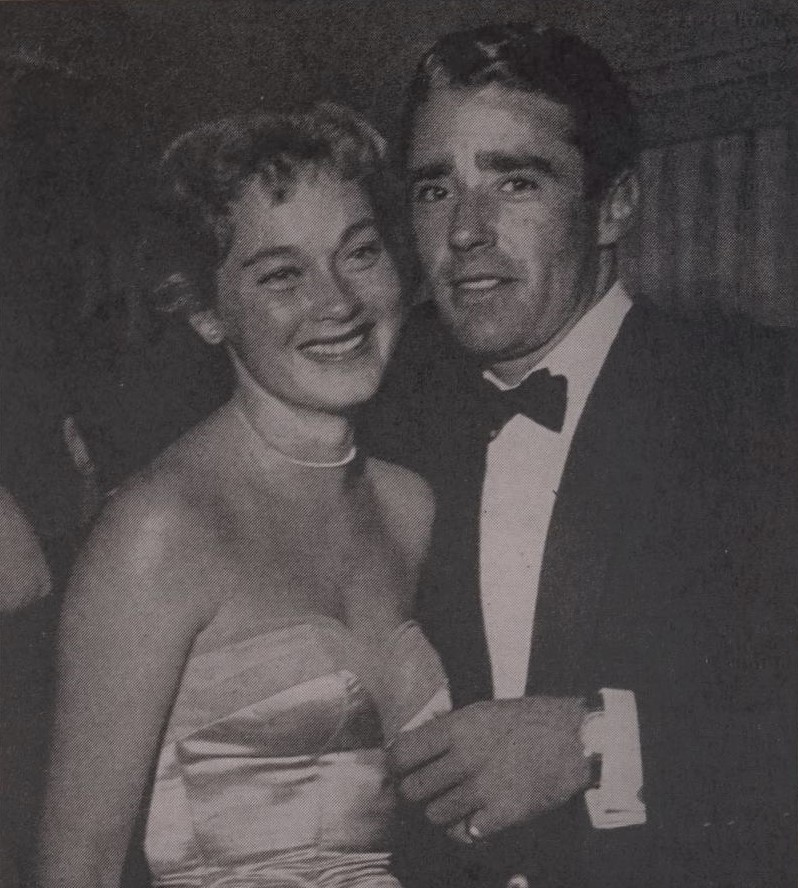
Eddington with Peter Lawford, 1949

Eddington was highly critical of Charles Higham's biography of her first husband, Errol Flynn, the Untold Story, stating to Maggie Daly of the Chicago Tribune: "I resent Higham's book because it is a fraud. He hasn't come up with a single document about Errol's supposed tie-in with the Gestapo, but continues to go around the country saying he has". Her own book about her life with Flynn, entitled Errol and Me, was published in 1960.

== Career ==
Films in which Eddington appeared included Adventures of Don Juan (1948), in which she portrayed the lady in the carriage asking for directions (uncredited) and Cruise of the Zaca (1952), playing herself.

== Death ==
Eddington died in 2001, aged 77, after a long battle with kidney disease, at Cedars Sinai Hospital, Los Angeles. She was interred in Westwood Village Memorial Park Cemetery beside her son Kevin.

== Bibliography ==
- Flynn, Errol. My Wicked, Wicked Ways: the Autobiography of Errol Flynn. Intro. by Jeffrey Meyers. New York: Cooper Square Press, 2003. Rpt. of My Wicked, Wicked Ways. New York: G.P. Putnam's sons, 1959. ISBN 0-8154-1250-9.
