= Lyle Reifsnider =

- Born: August 11, 1901; Chicago, Illinois, USA
- Died: December 9, 1980 (aged 79); Los Angeles, California, USA
- Other name: Lyle B. Reifsnider
- Occupation: Set decorator
- Years active: 1946 - 1962

Leif B. Reifsnider (August 11, 1901 – December 9, 1980) was an American set decorator who worked in Hollywood movies from 1946 to 1962. Nominated for an Academy Award for his work on the Errol Flynn swashbuckler Adventures of Don Juan in 1949, he was also responsible for the set dressings on films such as My Wild Irish Rose (1947), The Flame and the Arrow (1950) and April in Paris (1952).
