= USS Zaca (IX-73) =

Wooden-hulled, schooner-rigged yacht

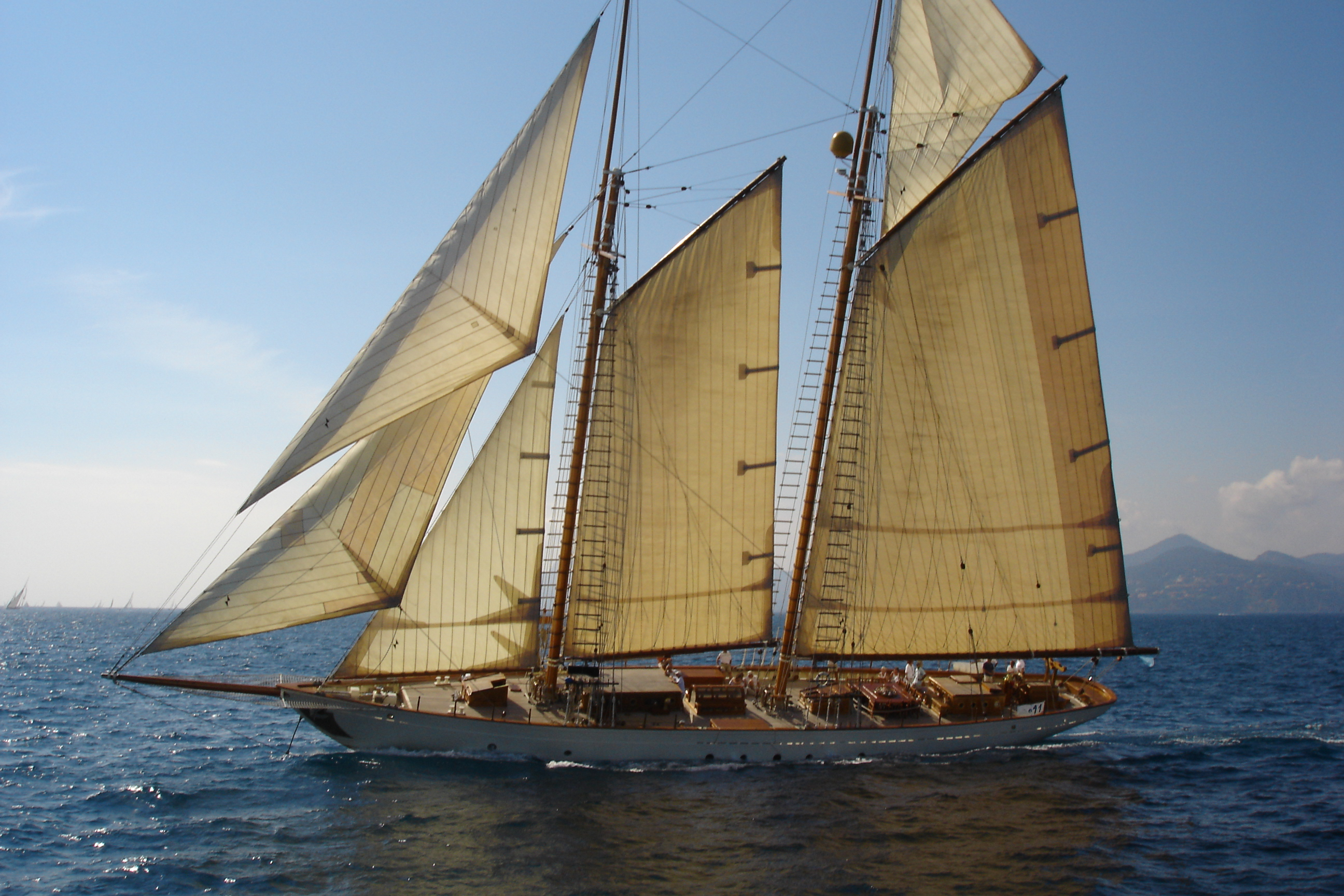
- Zaca

History

United States
- Name: Zaca
- Builder: Nunes Brothers
- Launched: 1930
- Acquired: 12 June 1942
- In service: 19 June 1942
- Out of service: 6 October 1944
- Stricken: 13 November 1944
- Identification: MMSI number: 244110530; Callsign: PE4170
- Fate: Sold

General characteristics
- Displacement: 122 tons
- Length: 118 ft (36 m)
- Beam: 23 ft 9 in (7.24 m)
- Draft: 14 ft (4.3 m)
- Speed: 9 knots
- Complement: 10

USS Zaca (IX-73) is a wooden-hulled, schooner-rigged yacht with an auxiliary engine.

== History ==
The boat was commissioned by Charles Templeton Crocker, to a design of Garland Rotch, and built by Nunes Brothers Boat and Ways Co. as a vessel for sailing around the world with all the modern conveniences of the time. When his new boat was completed in 1930 at Sausalito, California, Crocker spent the 1930s sailing the Zaca around the world on various expeditions, primarily in the name of scientific discovery and on behalf of the California Academy of Sciences, where many of his records sit now.

From Palmyra Atoll to the Galapagos, Crocker collected and documented plant and animal life with a small crew of scientists and artists, including Japanese photographer and artist Toshio Asaeda.

=== World War II ===
Due to the need for local patrol and rescue craft in the busy waters in the San Francisco area during World War II, the schooner was acquired by the US Navy from Templeton Crocker on 12 June 1942. Placed in service on 19 June 1942 and assigned to the Western Sea Frontier, Zaca was classified a miscellaneous auxiliary and designated IX-73. She was the second ship of that name to serve in the US Navy, and operated as a plane-guard ship, standing ready to rescue the crews of any planes downed nearby.

Eventually relieved by the frigates (PF's) of Escort Squadron 41, Zaca was placed out of service at Treasure Island, California on 6 October 1944; and her name was struck from the Navy list on 13 November 1944.

=== Errol Flynn ===
Turned over to the War Shipping Administration on 21 May 1945, Zaca was acquired in 1946 by Errol Flynn. Zaca is featured prominently in the 1947 Orson Welles film The Lady from Shanghai. A documentary short film Cruise of the Zaca which features Flynn and his father Theodore Thomson Flynn, an eminent marine biologist, collecting marine samples in the semi-tropics, was made in 1952. Flynn owned the yacht until his death in 1959.

=== Today ===
As of 2008, Zaca is privately owned by Roberto Memmo and berthed in Monaco. A skipper and crew of four regularly sail Zaca to ports such as Punta Ala, Gaeta, Capri, Cagliari, and throughout the Aegean Sea. The Zaca is frequently seen at prestigious sailing races in the Mediterranean. Her winter port is in Port de Fontvieille, Monaco. In 2009, the Nautical Channel dedicated a program to the entire history of the Zaca from original construction to the present entitled "In the Wake of the Zaca".
