= Cruise of the Zaca =

- Directed by: Errol Flynn
- Written by: Owen Crump
- Starring: Errol Flynn; Theodore Thomson Flynn; Howard Hill; Nora Eddington
- Narrated by: Errol Flynn
- Cinematography: Jerry Corneya
- Edited by: Rex Steele
- Music by: Howard Jackson
- Distributed by: Warner Bros.
- Release date: 6 December 1952
- Running time: 17 minutes
- Country: United States
- Language: English

Cruise of the Zaca is a short documentary on 16mm about a trip taken by Errol Flynn in 1946 on his boat the Zaca to collect specimens with his father, Professor Theodore Thomson Flynn, an eminent marine biologist. The trip was done in association with the Scripps Institution of Oceanography and took place off the east coast of Mexico and in the West Indies.

== Story ==
Errol Flynn leaves his house on Mulholland Drive by helicopter captained by Paul Mantz and goes to the Scripps Institution of Oceanography. He goes on board the Zaca and visits San Benito Island off the west coast of Baja California, home to a number of rare endemic plant and animal species, the Panama Canal and Jamaica.

== Cast ==
- Errol Flynn as Self - Narrator
- Carl L. Hubbs as Self (as Dr. Carl L. Hubbs)
- Laura Hubbs as Self
- Theodore Thomson Flynn as Self (as Thomson Flynn)
- John Decker as Self
- Howard Hill as Self
- Nora Eddington as Self (as Nora)

== Production ==
The trip started in August 1946. On board were Flynn, his father, his wife Nora, and John Decker, Howard Hill, Professor Carl Hubbs, Charles Gross and Jerry Corneya. After a month of sailing, many of the group left, including Flynn's wife and father, but Flynn pushed on through the Panama Canal to the Caribbean to Cap-Haitien. Before going through the Canal, Flynn stayed in Acapulco, where the Zaca had been hired to appear in location shooting during 1946 for The Lady from Shanghai (1948).

== Release ==
Due to Flynn's 1949 divorce from Nora, release of the film was held up until December 1952. Although shot on 16mm the film was blown up to 35mm.

In October 1951 it was announced Flynn had produced two films based on his travels, Voyage of the Zaca and Whaling in the Pacific.

=== Critical reception ===
The critic from the Los Angeles Times said "it is rather a family affair with Flynn narrating effectively enough."

Filmink called it "not a good little movie ... [but] a fascinating insight to the sailing aspect of his life."

== Deep Sea Fishing ==
Deep Sea Fishing
- Directed by: Errol Flynn
- Produced by: Howard Hill
- Starring: Errol Flynn
- Narrated by: Bob Edge
- Release date: 1952
- Running time: 10 mins
- Country: United States
- Language: English

Deep Sea Fishing was another film based on a fishing trip Flynn took with Howard Hill. It was shot in 16mm during the Cruise of the Zaca journey and involves Flynn and Hill boarding a small launch to fish for marlin and sail fish. Because of Flynn's contract with Warner Bros, which prevented his appearances of this kind, his name is never mentioned by the narrator.
