= Adventures of Don Juan =

1948 film by Vincent Sherman

- Theatrical release poster
- Directed by: Vincent Sherman
- Written by: Herbert Dalmas; George Oppenheimer; Harry Kurnitz
- Produced by: Jerry Wald
- Starring: Errol Flynn; Viveca Lindfors; Robert Douglas
- Cinematography: Elwood Bredell
- Edited by: Alan Crosland, Jr.
- Music by: Max Steiner
- Color process: Technicolor
- Production company: Warner Bros. Pictures
- Distributed by: Warner Bros. Pictures
- Release date: December 24, 1948 (New York)
- Running time: 110 minutes
- Country: United States
- Languages: English; Spanish
- Budget: $3,408,000 or $3 million
- Box office: $4,772,000

Adventures of Don Juan (Note: Also known as The Adventures of Don Juan, and released in the UK as The New Adventures of Don Juan) is a 1948 American Technicolor swashbuckling adventure romance film directed by Vincent Sherman and starring Errol Flynn and Viveca Lindfors, with Robert Douglas, Alan Hale, Ann Rutherford, and Robert Warwick. Also in the cast are Barbara Bates, Raymond Burr, and Mary Stuart. It concerns the legendary, fictional Spanish character Don Juan and his exploits.

The film was distributed by Warner Bros. Pictures and produced by Jerry Wald. The screenplay by George Oppenheimer and Harry Kurnitz, based on a story by Herbert Dalmas, has uncredited contributions by William Faulkner and Robert Florey.

== Plot ==
Late in the reign of Elizabeth I of England, Spanish noble Don Juan de Maraña is repatriated from London to Madrid, following a diplomatic scandal caused by his dalliance with the English fiancée of a Spanish nobleman. The Spanish ambassador in London, Count de Polan, an old family friend, sends a letter of recommendation to Queen Margaret of Spain.

He requests that she provide an opportunity at the Spanish court for the rehabilitation of Don Juan's reputation from the swirling gossip and scandal that have followed him around Europe in the wake of his many illicit love affairs. Accepting her old friend's suggestion, Queen Margaret thus appoints Don Juan as a fencing instructor to the Royal Spanish Academy, where he is a great success. During his time at court, he secretly falls in love with the Queen but remains a staunchly loyal subject to her and her irresponsible and weak husband, King Philip III.

Don Juan discovers a treacherous plan by the Machiavellian Duke de Lorca, who is holding the loyal Count de Polan as a secret prisoner. The Duke is plotting to depose the monarchs, usurp their power over Spain, and declare war on England. With the support of his friends at court, Don Juan heroically defends the Queen and the King against de Lorca and his henchmen, finally defeating his plan in a duel to death, saving Spain.

The queen professes her love for Don Juan, now seeing his many virtues. Despite loving her deeply, more than any other woman in his life, he says that they could never be happy or survive such scandal. Both her subjects and Spain would fare poorly under the sole rule of the king. They both have a higher duty that must be served. Since the queen is the one woman he truly loves and can never rightfully have, he asks that she allow him to leave court and to continue his life elsewhere. She painfully grants him his wish, and he leaves the palace forever to continue his journeys in Spain.

== Cast ==
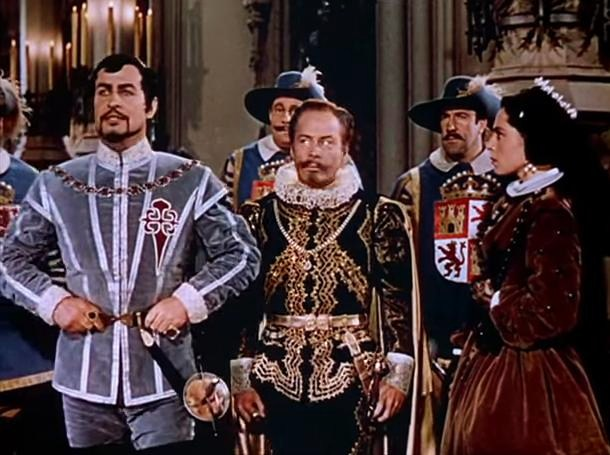
Left to right: Robert Douglas, Romney Brent and Viveca Lindfors in the film trailer.

- Errol Flynn as Don Juan de Maraña
- Viveca Lindfors as Margaret of Austria Queen of Spain
- Robert Douglas as Duke de Lorca
- Alan Hale as Leporello
- Romney Brent as King Philip III of Spain
- Ann Rutherford as Doña Elena
- Robert Warwick as Don Jose, Count de Polan
- Jerry Austin as Don Sebastian
- Douglas Kennedy as Don Rodrigo
- Jean Shepherd (Jeanne Shepherd) as Donna Carlotta
- Mary Stuart as Catherine
- Helen Westcott as Lady Diana
- Fortunio Bonanova as Don Serafino Lopez
- Aubrey Mather as Lord Chalmers
- Una O'Connor as Duenna
- Raymond Burr as Captain Alvarez
- Nora Eddington as young woman asking for direction
- Tim Huntley as Cecil (Catherine's husband)
- Leon Belasco as Don de Córdoba
- David Leonard as Innkeeper
- Barbara Bates as Micaela (Innkeeper's daughter)
- Monte Blue as Turnkey
- David Bruce as Count de Orsini
- Caren Marsh Doll as Girl at Inn (uncredited)

== Production ==
Warner Bros. Pictures had a big box office hit in the 1920s with Don Juan (1926) starring John Barrymore.

=== Proposed 1939 film ===
Errol Flynn was linked with a Don Juan project as early as the 1930s. In March 1939, Warner Bros. announced The Adventures of Don Juan, starring Flynn, would be one of 48 films made from 1939 to 1940. The studio assigned W. R. Burnett to write the picture after a John Dillinger movie he was working on was delayed. Warners stated Olivia de Havilland, Priscilla Lane, Margaret Lindsay, Ann Sheridan, and Lya Lys would appear in the film, along with five other actresses. Filming would start once Flynn had completed work on The Knight and the Lady (which became The Private Lives of Elizabeth and Essex). Franciska Gaal was screen-tested for a role. But filming was postponed again, so Flynn did The Sea Hawk (1940) instead.

With the advent of World War II, production of elaborate costume pictures dropped off due to the European market being closed, and Flynn was more commonly found in war films and Westerns.

=== Proposed 1945 film ===
The project was reactivated in 1944, with Jerry Wald attached as producer, Alan Le May as writer, and Robert Florey as director. Flynn was meant to make it after finishing San Antonio.

In January 1945 Herbert Dalmas and Harry Goldman were reportedly working on the script. (The time period of this film would change from Italy of the Borgias in the 1926 Barrymore version to 1620 Spain under Philip III.)

In March 1945 Raoul Walsh was announced as director. Claudette Colbert was sought for the female lead. The proposed cast at this time only included Flynn, Victor Francen (as the King), and Dorothy Malone from the eventual film.

The film was to have started filming in early May 1945 with a budget of $2 million. The studio set for Mexico City used in Juarez (1939) was turned into Madrid. Flynn did fencing training with Fred Cavens, and George Coulouris (the intended main villain) did extensive dieting for the role. According to studio publicity, 54 ladies were auditioned to play Juan's eight love interests and the film would use 124 different sets and over 3,700 costumes.

Filming was postponed due to difficulty in sourcing costumes (there was a general post-war shortage) and an industry strike that affected construction and painting of sets. On May 9, the decision was made to postpone the film indefinitely, and the actors were assigned to other films. Flynn was put into Don't Ever Leave Me (which became Never Say Goodbye).

=== Further development ===
In January 1946 Warners put the film back on the schedule. Martha Vickers, Dorothy Malone, Peggy Knudsen, Joan Lorring and Joan Chandler were announced for support parts. However filming continued to be delayed.

Warner Bros. were encouraged to re-activate the film again by a successful 1947 reissue of Flynn's earlier starring vehicles, The Adventures of Robin Hood (1938) and The Sea Hawk (1940).

In February 1947 Jean Negulesco was announced as director. Alexis Smith was to be his co star and filming was to take place after Flynn finished Silver River.

Negulesco later recalled the film was "the most expensive and sought-after project on the Warner lot. I had unorthodox ideas about Don Juan: I thought he should have been a victim of women rather than their victimizer. Flynn didn't agree with me at all because he still wanted to be the wonderful guy who jumps out the window pursued by the irate husband saying 'You made love to my wife' and all that."

After three months Flynn told Jack Warner he would not make the film with Negulesco. Warner told the director "Johnny I cannot make Don Juan without Errol Flynn but I can make it without you." Negulesco agreed and Warner assigned him to producer Jerry Wald for Johnny Belinda.

By September 1947 Vincent Sherman was to direct from a script by George Oppenheimer and Harry Kurnitz. Romney Brent who played the Dauphin in Joan of Lorraine was signed to play Philip III. In October Viveca Lindfors was given the female lead.

== Shooting ==
Shooting eventually began in October 1947. George Oppenheimer later wrote "From the start the picture was a misery and a trial. The director, Vincent Sherman, and I not only failed to see eye to eye, but to work cheek by jowl. Before we had finished, the film had been retitled Sherman’s March through George. In addition, Flynn, an attractive and friendly fellow off the lot, was off the lot during a large part of the shooting on a series of binges."

Errol Flynn was suffering from poor health, reportedly from a mild heart condition and recurrent bouts of hepatitis. According to film historian Tony Thomas, Flynn drank heavily during the production's shooting. Filming was frequently halted due to Flynn's physical condition and by frequent changes and replacements in production personnel. In January Flynn was hospitalised and was ill for fifteen days, causing production to halt. Flynn returned, but fell ill again and the production shut down once more.

On 6 February the production shut down a third time, for a fortnight, because of Flynn's illness. In March it was estimated that Flynn had missed 64 days of shooting.

The rising costs concerned Warner Bros. about the profitability of the film, particularly as Britain, which was expected to be a major market, recently introduced a heavy tax on Hollywood films, though the tax ended in 1948.

In the famous on-screen leap from the head of a long staircase, Flynn was doubled by stunt expert Jock Mahoney. In the silent film Don Juan (1926), Flynn's idol John Barrymore performed a similar leap without a stunt double.

At the end of the picture, the young woman in the coach asking Don Juan for directions is Flynn's wife, Nora Eddington.

During filming, in November, Flynn signed a new contract with Warner Bros. to make one film a year until 1961, of which Don Juan was to be the first.

The chase scene early in the film used recycled footage from The Adventures of Robin Hood (1938), and is then followed by a grand procession with recycled outtakes from The Private Lives of Elizabeth and Essex (1939), both starring Errol Flynn and Alan Hale.

The film is the last of 13 in which Hale and his close friend Errol Flynn appeared together. Hale died on January 22, 1950, just over a year after this film's theatrical release.

=== Music ===
The film was originally to be scored by Erich Wolfgang Korngold. However, production of the film was postponed until 1947, by which time Korngold had retired from scoring motion pictures. He was replaced by Max Steiner, who incorporated several Spanish songs into his score.

The score was adapted years later by composer Ian Fraser for the George Hamilton swashbuckling comedy film Zorro, The Gay Blade (1981). A portion was also used in two scenes in the film The Goonies (1985), although in the first scene, it accompanied a TV broadcast of an earlier film, Captain Blood (1935).

== Reception ==
=== Critical ===
Bosley Crowther of The New York Times wrote: "Warner Brothers have generously contributed a production of rare magnificence. The sets and costumes are exquisite—there is no other word ... If for no other reason than to take a look at the splash, we suggest you see this picture. It is something to remember old Hollywood by." Variety wrote that out of several recent swashbuckling films, "'Adventures of Don Juan' measures up among the best of them ... The loves and escapades of the fabulous Don Juan are particularly adapted to the screen abilities of Errol Flynn and he gives them a flair that pays off strongly."

Harrison's Reports called the film "trite both in story and treatment", but "should go over pretty well with those who enjoy colorful pageantry with plenty of glittering swordplay and exciting chases."

John McCarten of The New Yorker called it "a picture that demonstrates once again that Errol Flynn is muscular as all get out but quite innocent of any ability in the acting line."

Filmink magazine called it "a magnificent return to form for Flynn and one of the best swashbucklers ever made. "

=== Box office ===
The film was very successful in Europe, earning $2,607,000. It recorded admissions of 3,763,314 in France, making it the 7th most popular film in the country that year.

However, in the US it made only $1.9 million in 1949 and $2,165,000 overall, meaning it struggled to recoup its large budget. From this point on, Warner Bros reduced the budgets of Flynn's films.

== Awards and honors ==
The film won the Academy Award for Best Costume Design, Color (Leah Rhodes, Travilla and Marjorie Best) and was nominated for the Academy Award for Best Art Direction-Set Direction, Color (Edward Carrere, Lyle Reifsnider).

== Comic book ==
Norman Pett drew a comic book adaptation of the film in 1948.
