= Without Incident =

- Playhouse 90 episode
- Episode no.: Season 1 Episode 36
- Directed by: Charles Marquis Warren
- Written by: David Victor; Herbert Little Jnr
- Based on: story by Charles Marquis Warren
- Production code: Filmmaster Productions
- Original air date: June 6, 1957

Guest appearances
- Errol Flynn; Ann Sheridan; John Ireland; Julie London

Episode chronology
← Previous "Circle of the Day"	Next → "Clash by Night"

Without Incident is a 1957 episode of Playhouse 90 starring Errol Flynn.

== Plot ==
The captain of a U.S. Cavalry unit rescues two wives of slain traders who were being held hostage by hostile Native Americans but then is faced with a mutiny among his own men.

== Cast ==
- Errol Flynn as Captain Russell Bidlack
- Anne Sheridan as Kathy
- Julie London as Angela
- John Ireland as Sgt Turley
- Rodolfo Acosta

== Production ==
Traditionally all shows on Playhouse 90 were made by Screen Gems and done live. However, in January 1957 CBS announced that three episodes would be made by another company, Filmaster Productions, and shot on location: "Carbine Web", "Lone Woman" and "Without Incident".

In February 1957 it was announced the episode may be spun off into a TV series starring Flynn but this did not happen.

Filming begun on location in Tucson, Arizona on March 4, with studio work in Hollywood. {Another account says filming started in Hollywood on 28 February and that the budget was around $150,000.) It was one of three Filmmaster productions being shot for Playhouse 90 in Arizona, the others being Lone Woman and Carbine Web. Each took around a week to film.

"I play a wonton," said Julie London.

== Reception ==
Filmink magazine later wrote that this was "a different sort of character for" Flynn "a hated martinet who is willing to sacrifice the life of his men if it means keeping the Apaches at bay... it’s not one of his best performances, but the story is solid."
