= Theodore Thomson Flynn =

Australian zoologist (1883–1968)

Theodore Thomson Flynn MBE FLS FZS FRS MRIA
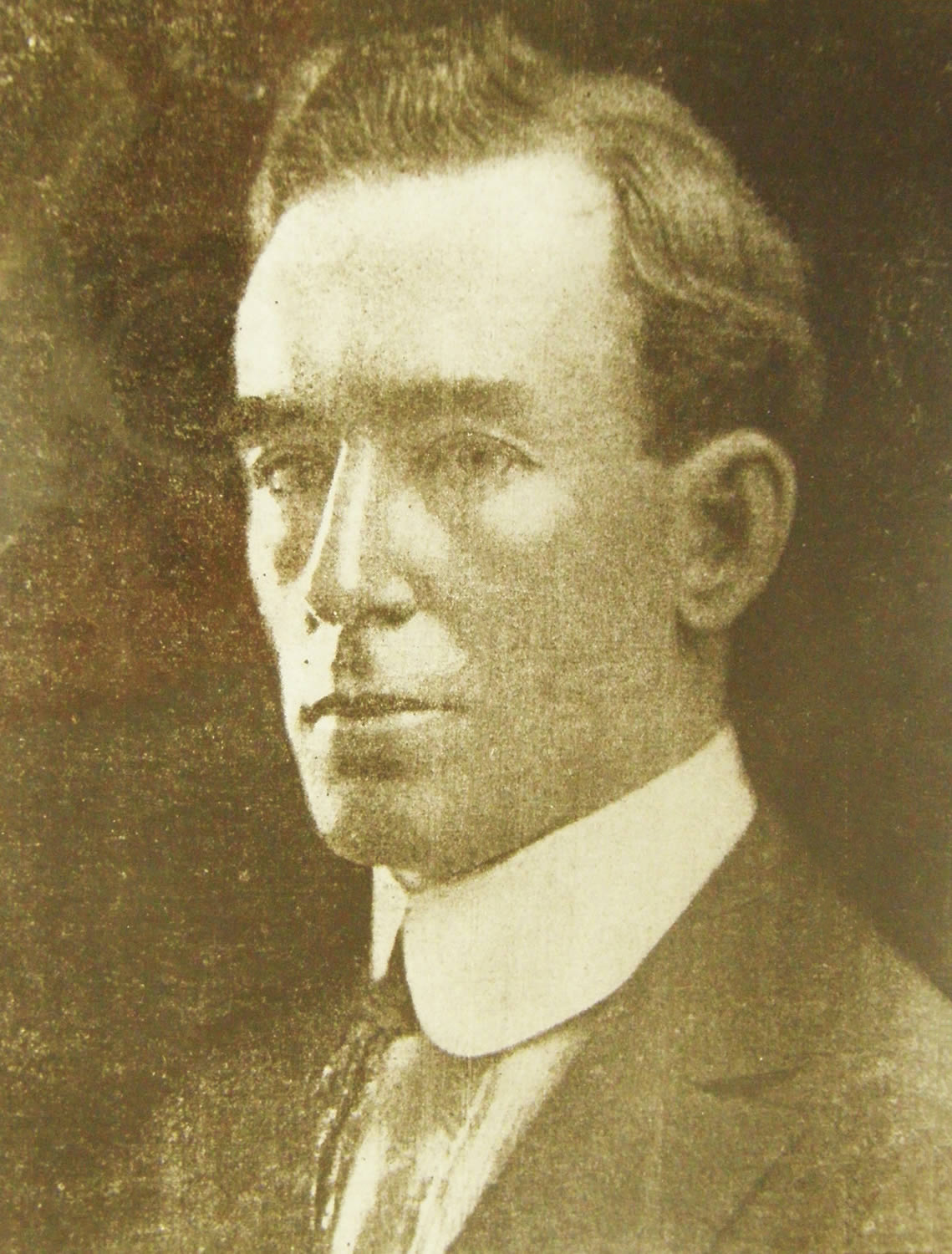
- Born: 11 October 1883; Coraki, New South Wales, Australia
- Died: 23 October 1968 (aged 85); Liss, Hampshire, England
- Spouse: Lily Mary (Marelle) Young (m. 1909)
- Children: 2, including Errol Flynn
- Relatives: Lili Damita (daughter-in-law); Sean Flynn (grandson); Sean Flynn (great-grandson)
- Scientific career
- Fields: Marine biology; Zoology

Theodore Thomson Flynn MBE FLS FZS FRS MRIA (11 October 1883 – 23 October 1968) was an Australian-British zoologist and marine biologist and a professor in both Tasmania and the United Kingdom. He was the first biology professor in Tasmania. Flynn was the father of the actor Errol Flynn.

== Biography ==
Theodore Thomson Flynn was born in Coraki, New South Wales, Australia, the son of Jessie B. (née Thomson) and John Thomas Flynn a cordial manufacturer. He was the oldest of eight children. His parents later divorced. His paternal grandparents were from Ireland. His grandfather John Flynn was from Mohill, County Leitrim, Connacht, and his grandmother Anne Connaughty was from Trim, County Meath, Leinster.

Flynn attended Fort Street High School where he was a pupil teacher. He later earned a scholarship to the Sydney Teachers' College at the University of Sydney and graduated with a Bachelor of Science (B.Sc.) in Biology in 1907. While at the University, he was a distinguished scholar, winning the John Coutts Scholarships, the Macleay Fellowship offered by the Linnean Society of NSW and the Medal for Biology in 1906. He later gained Doctor of Philosophy (D.Sc.) in 1921 for his work on marsupial embryology. Flynn began working as a chemistry and physics teacher at Newcastle High School and Maitland High School. He became a biology lecturer at the University of Tasmania in 1909, becoming the first biology professor in Tasmania. He later became a professor in 1911 and teaching there until 1930.

He married Lily Mary (Marelle) Young on 23 January 1909; they had two children together, a daughter Nora Rosemary Flynn, and a son, the film actor Errol Flynn. Flynn and his family then moved to Northern Ireland where he served as the Chair of Zoology at Queen's University of Belfast from 1931 to 1948; he also became director of the marine station at Portaferry.

After the Belfast Blitz, Flynn was the chief casualty officer for the city. On 1 January 1945, Flynn was awarded an Order of the British Empire for his service.

Flynn died at Hillbrow Nursing Home in Liss, Hampshire, England, on 23 October, 1968.

== Legacy ==
Flynn Lake, Macquarie Island was named after Flynn.
