= The Golden Shanty (Goodyear Theatre) =

- Goodyear Theatre episode
- Episode no.: Season 3 Episode 5
- Directed by: Arthur Hiller
- Written by: Jameson Brewer
- Based on: story by Edward Dyson
- Production code: Screen Gems
- Original air date: 9 November 1959

Guest appearance
- Errol Flynn

"The Golden Shandy" is a 1959 episode of the TV series Goodyear Theatre.

It marked the last filmed performance of Errol Flynn and was broadcast after he died.

== Plot ==
Traveling medicine man Doc Boatwright goes through Nugget City. The female co-owner of a saloon throws a brick of the saloon at him. Boatwright realises the brick contains gold and tries to con her out of it.

== Cast ==
- Errol Flynn as Doc Boatwright
- Patricia Barry as Adie Walker
- Peter Hansen as Mike Walker
- James McCallion as Hermise Schneider
- Fred Sherman as Clyde Murrow
- Juney Ellis as Henrietta

== Production ==
The script was based on a short story by Australian writer Edward Dyson which was first published in 1889. Dyson later turned it into a play.

In August 1959 Hedda Hopper reported that Patricia Barry turned down the chance to appear in Line Up to go to New York to make the production. "She must have wanted a trip to New York," wrote Hopper.

The production was shot in three days. Director Arthur Hiller said Flynn had a great deal of trouble remembering his lines.
