= The Lady from Shanghai =

1947 film by Orson Welles

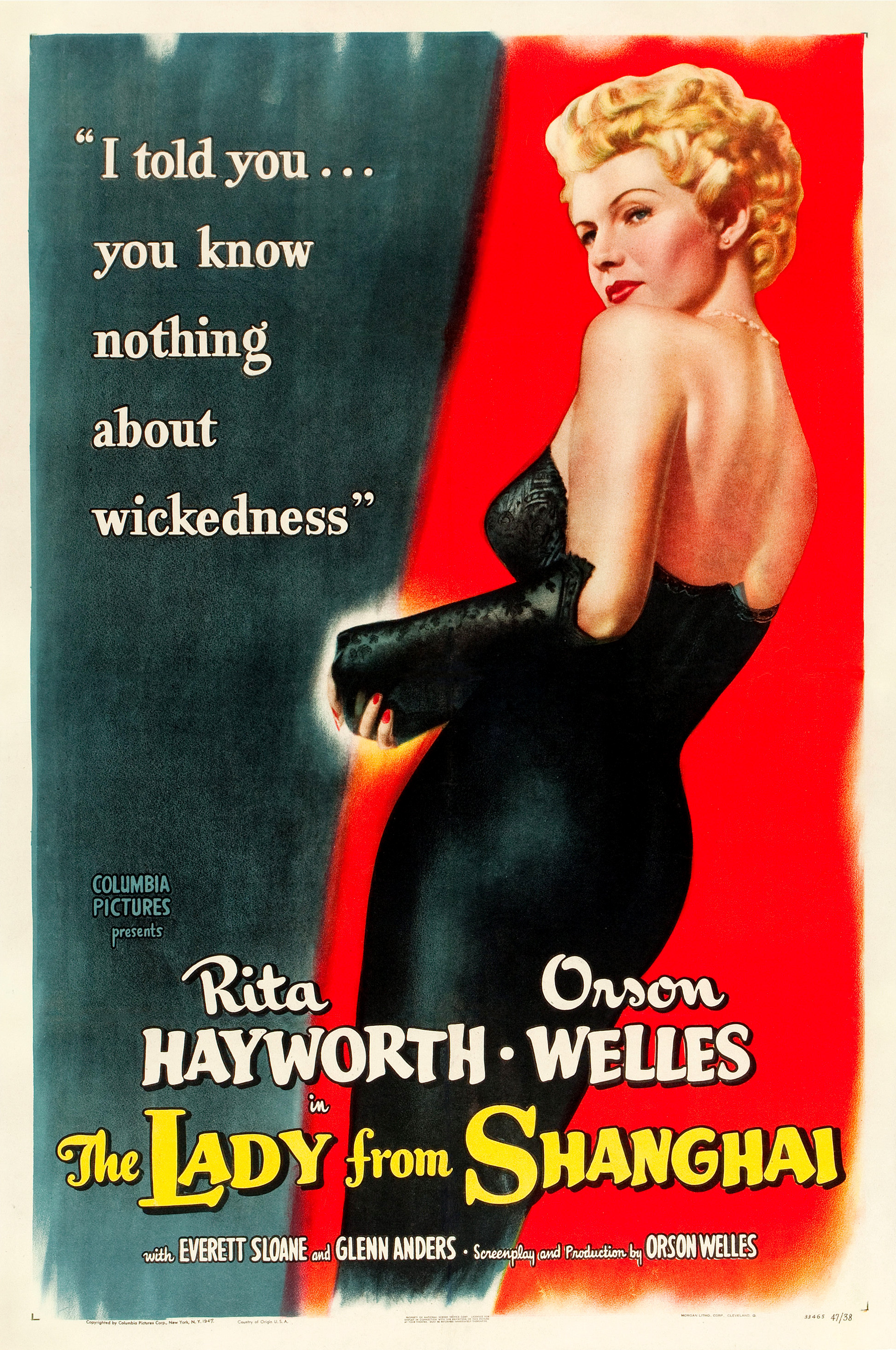
- Theatrical release poster
- Directed by: Orson Welles (Note: Uncredited)
- Screenplay by: Orson Welles; William Castle (Note: Uncredited); Charles Lederer (Note: Uncredited); Fletcher Markle (Note: Uncredited)
- Based on: If I Die Before I Wake (1938) by Raymond Sherwood King
- Produced by: Orson Welles
- Starring: Rita Hayworth; Orson Welles; Everett Sloane; Glenn Anders
- Cinematography: Charles Lawton Jr.; Rudolph Maté (Note: Uncredited); Joseph Walker (Note: Uncredited)
- Edited by: Viola Lawrence
- Music by: Heinz Roemheld
- Production company: Mercury Productions
- Distributed by: Columbia Pictures
- Release dates: December 24, 1947 (France); April 14, 1948 (United States)
- Running time: 88 minutes
- Country: United States
- Language: English
- Box office: 1,564,609 admissions (France)

The Lady from Shanghai is a 1947 American film noir produced and directed by Orson Welles and starring Rita Hayworth, Welles, Everett Sloane, and Glenn Anders. Welles's screenplay is based on the novel If I Die Before I Wake by Sherwood King.

Although the Columbia Pictures film initially received mixed reviews, it has grown in stature over the years. In 2018, the film was selected for preservation in the United States National Film Registry by the Library of Congress as being "culturally, historically, or aesthetically significant."

== Plot ==
Irish sailor Michael O'Hara rescues a woman named Elsa when hooligans waylay her horse-drawn coach in Central Park. Escorting her to her car, Michael reveals he is a seaman and learns Elsa and her husband, criminal defense attorney Arthur Bannister, are newly arrived in New York City from Shanghai. They are on their way to San Francisco via the Panama Canal. Michael, attracted to Elsa despite misgivings, agrees to sign on as an able seaman aboard Bannister's yacht.

They are joined on the boat by Bannister's partner, George Grisby, who proposes that Michael "murder" him in a plot to fake his own death. He promises Michael $5,000 and explains that since he would not be actually dead and there would be no corpse, Michael could not be convicted of murder (reflecting corpus delicti laws at the time). Michael agrees, intending to use the money to run away with Elsa. Grisby has Michael sign a confession.

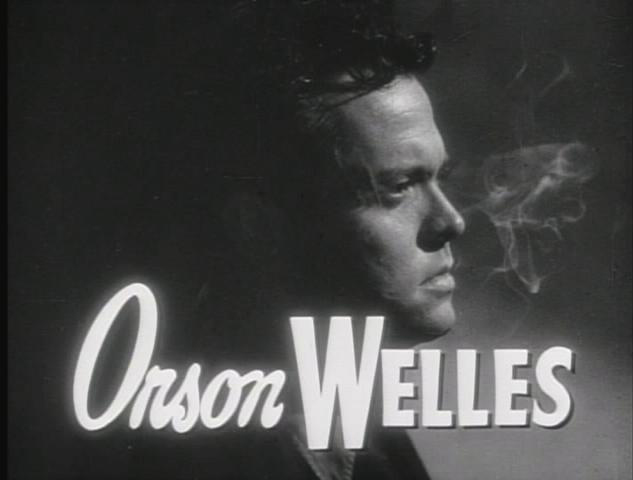
Welles as Michael O'Hara in The Lady from Shanghai (1947)

On the night of the crime, Sydney Broome, a private investigator who has been following Elsa on her husband's orders, confronts Grisby, having learned of Grisby's plan to murder Bannister, frame Michael, and escape by pretending to have also been murdered. Grisby shoots Broome and leaves him for dead. Unaware of what has happened, Michael proceeds with the night's arrangement and sees Grisby off on a motorboat before shooting a gun into the ground to draw attention to himself. A mortally wounded Broome warns Michael that he is being set up and Grisby intends to kill Bannister. Michael rushes to Bannister's office to find Bannister alive and Grisby dead. The police discover evidence implicating Michael, including his confession, and take him away.

At trial, Bannister acts as Michael's attorney. Upon learning of his wife's relationship with Michael, he ultimately takes pleasure in the suspicion that they will lose the case, while also indicates that he knows the real killer's identity. Before the verdict, Michael feigns a suicide attempt by swallowing Bannister's pain relief pills, and slips out of the building in the ensuing commotion. Elsa follows, and she and Michael hide in a Chinatown theater while they wait for Elsa's Chinese friends to arrive. Michael realizes that she killed Grisby, but passes out from the pills he took and is carried to an empty funhouse.

When Michael wakes, he deduces that Grisby and Elsa had been planning to murder Bannister, and for Grisby to appear to be the only culprit, who would then disappear using the un-provable murder ploy. Broome's involvement ruined the scheme and Elsa killed Grisby for her own protection. She had planned that with her husband and Grisby out of the way, and Michael cleared of murder, they could be happy together.

Bannister tracks Elsa down and engages in a shootout with her in a hall of mirrors. He is killed while Elsa is mortally wounded. Disillusioned and ignoring Elsa's pleas to save her life, Michael leaves with the knowledge that a letter Bannister had left behind will clear him of any crimes. He contemplates, "Maybe I'll live so long that I'll forget her. Maybe I'll die trying."

== Cast ==
- Rita Hayworth as Elsa "Rosalie" Bannister
  - Singing voice was dubbed by Anita Kert Ellis
- Orson Welles as Michael O'Hara
- Everett Sloane as Arthur Bannister
- Glenn Anders as George Grisby
- Ted de Corsia as Sidney Broome
- Erskine Sanford as judge
- Gus Schilling as "Goldie" Goldfish
- Carl Frank as District Attorney Galloway
- Louis Merrill as Jake
- Evelyn Ellis as Bessie
- Harry Shannon as cab driver
- Wong Chung as Li (uncredited)
- Errol Flynn as man in background outside of cantina (uncredited)
- Philip Morris as port steward/Officer Peters (uncredited)
- Edward Peil Sr. as guard (uncredited)

== Production ==
In the summer of 1946, Welles was directing Around the World, a musical stage adaptation of the Jules Verne novel Around the World in Eighty Days, with a comedic and ironic book by Welles, incidental music and songs by Cole Porter, and production by Mike Todd, who would later produce the successful film version with David Niven. When Todd pulled out from the lavish and expensive production, Welles financed it. When he ran out of money and urgently needed $55,000 to release costumes that were being held, he convinced Columbia Pictures president Harry Cohn to send him the money to continue the show and in exchange Welles promised to write, produce, and direct a film for Cohn for no further fee.

As Welles told it, on the spur of the moment, he suggested the film be based on a book that he happened to see in front of him during his call with Cohn, one a girl in the theatre box office was reading at the time. Welles had never read it. However, according to the daughter of William Castle, it was her father who had purchased the film adaptation rights for the novel and who then asked Welles to pitch it to Cohn, with Castle hoping to receive the directoral assignment himself. She described her father as greatly respecting Welles's talents, but feeling nonetheless disappointed at being relegated to serve merely as Welles's assistant director on the film.

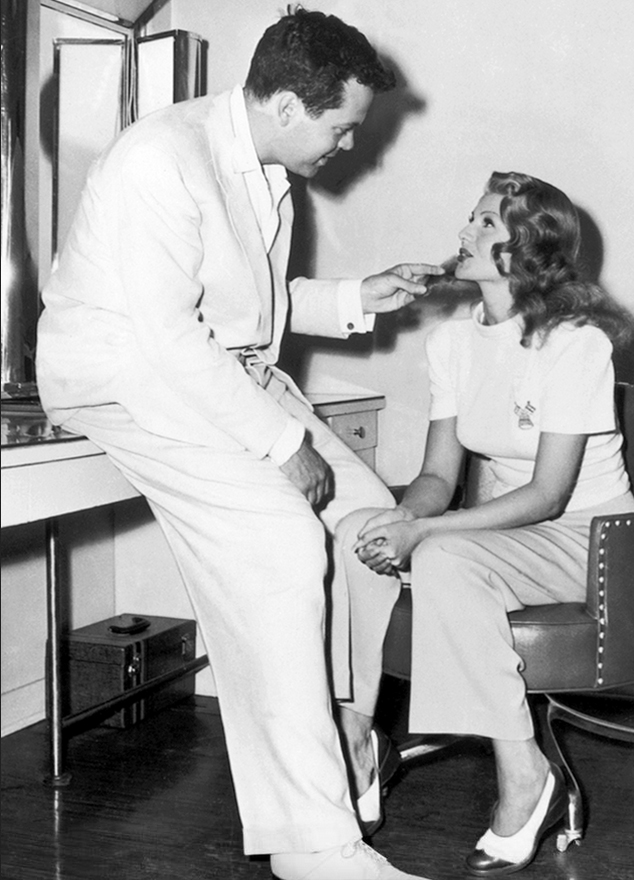
Orson Welles and Rita Hayworth shortly before her hair was bleached and cut for The Lady from Shanghai (1946)

The Lady from Shanghai began filming on 2 October 1946, and originally finished filming on 27 February 1947, with studio-ordered retakes continuing through March 1947—but it was not released in the U.S. until 9 June 1948. Cohn strongly disliked Welles's rough cut, particularly what he considered to be a confusing plot and lack of close-ups (Welles had deliberately avoided these, as a stylistic device), and was not in sympathy with Welles's Brechtian use of irony and black comedy, especially in a farcical courtroom scene. He also objected to the appearance of the film. Welles had aimed for documentary-style authenticity by shooting the film almost entirely on location (making it one of the first major Hollywood pictures to be shot in this way) in Acapulco, Pie de la Cuesta, Sausalito, and San Francisco), and by using primarily long takes, while Cohn preferred the more tightly controlled look of footage lit and shot in a studio. The release of the film was delayed due to Cohn's order for extensive editing and reshoots. Whereas Welles had delivered his cut of the film on time and under budget, the reshoots Welles was ordered to do meant that the film ended up over budget by a third, contributing to the director's reputation for going over budget. Once the reshoots were over, the heavy editing ordered by Cohn took over a year to complete; editor Viola Lawrence cut about an hour from Welles's rough cut.

Welles was appalled at the musical score, and he was particularly aggrieved by the cuts in the climactic confrontation scene in an amusement park funhouse at the end of the film. Intended as a climactic tour-de-force of editing and production design, the scene was cut to less than three minutes out of an intended running time of twenty minutes. As with many of the films over which Welles did not have control over the final cut, the missing footage has not been found and is presumed to have been destroyed. Surviving production stills show elaborate and expensive sets that were built for the sequence and which were entirely cut from the film.

Welles cast his wife Rita Hayworth as Elsa and caused a good deal of controversy when he instructed her to cut her long red hair and bleach it blonde for the role. "Orson was trying something new with me, but Harry Cohn wanted The Image—The Image he was gonna make me 'til I was 90," Rita Hayworth recalled. "The Lady from Shanghai was a very good picture. So what does Harry Cohn say when he sees it? 'He's ruined you—he cut your hair off!'"

=== Filming locations ===
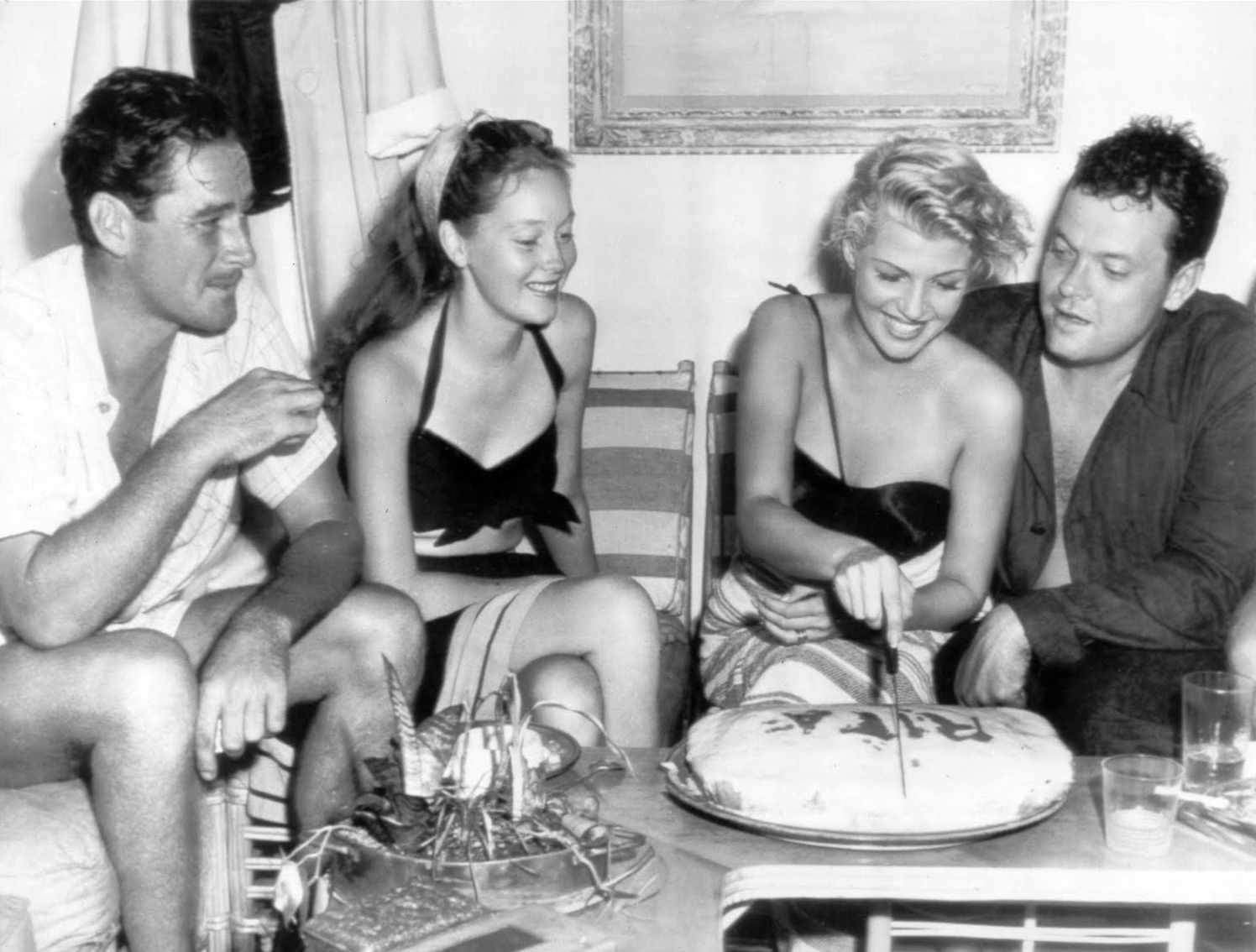
Aboard the Zaca, Errol Flynn, Nora Eddington, Rita Hayworth and Orson Welles celebrate Hayworth's 28th birthday (October 1946)

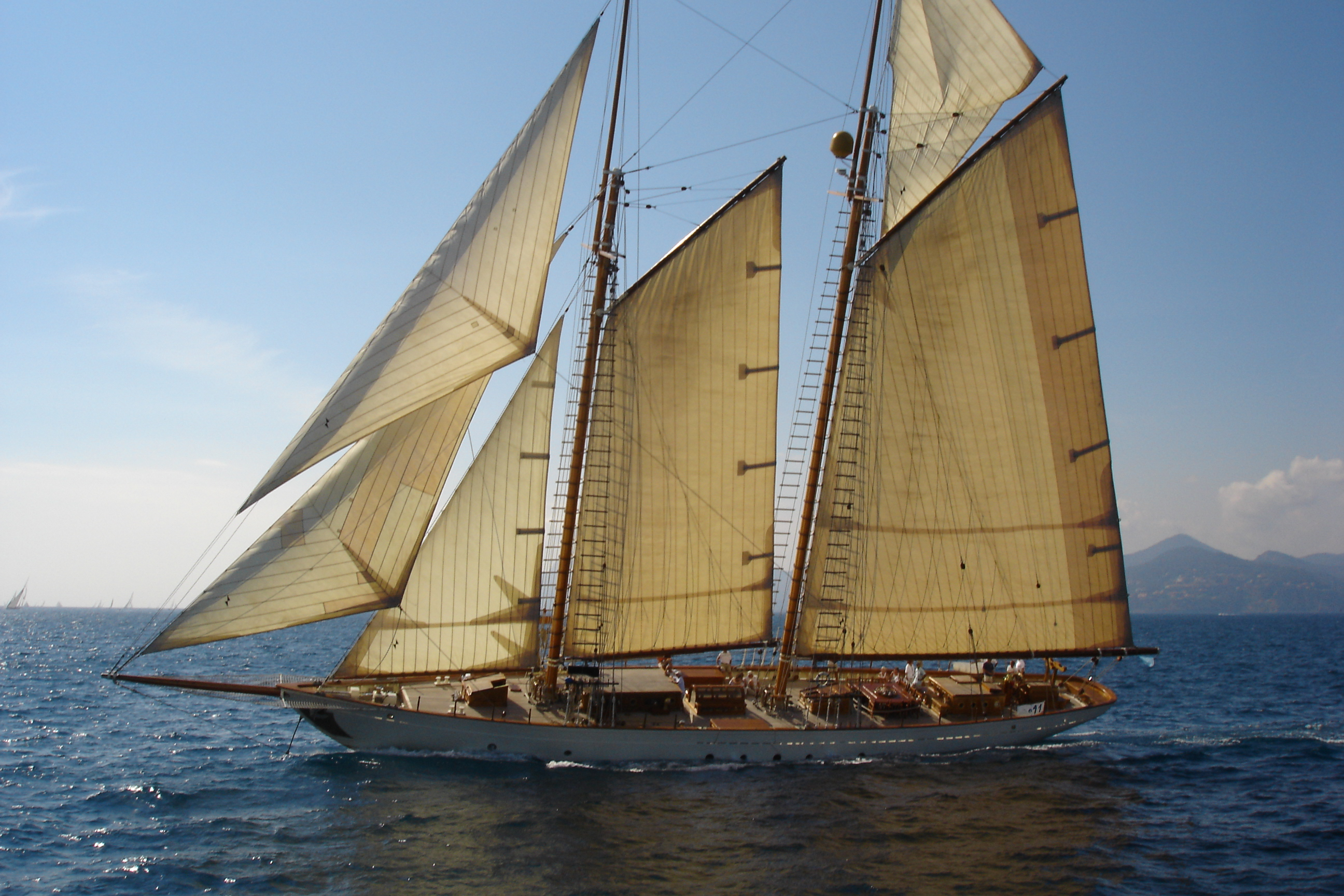
The Zaca in 2006

In addition to the Columbia Pictures studios, the film was partly shot on location in San Francisco. It features the Sausalito waterfront and Lee Kahn's Valhalla waterfront bar and cafe, the front, interior, and a courtroom scene of the old Kearny Street Hall of Justice, and shots of Welles running across Portsmouth Square, escaping to a long scene in a theater in Chinatown, then the Steinhart Aquarium in Golden Gate Park, and Whitney's Playland-at-the-Beach amusement park at Ocean Beach for the hall of mirrors scene, for which interiors were shot on a soundstage.

Other scenes were filmed in Acapulco. The yacht Zaca, on which many scenes take place, was owned by actor Errol Flynn, who skippered the yacht in between takes and can also be seen in the background in one scene at a cantina in Acapulco.

== Reception ==
The film was considered a disaster in the U.S. at the time of its release, although the closing shootout in a hall of mirrors has since become one of the touchstones of film noir. Not long after the film's release, Welles and Hayworth finalized their divorce.

William Brogdon of Variety found the script to be "wordy and full of holes" while also noting that the "rambling style used by Orson Welles has occasional flashes of imagination, particularly in the tricky backgrounds he uses to unfold the yarn, but effects, while good on their own, are distracting to the murder plot." Bosley Crowther of The New York Times similarly found the murder plot to be a "thoroughly confused and baffling thing. Tension is recklessly permitted to drain off in a sieve of tangled plot and in a lengthy court-room argument which has little save a few visual stunts. As producer of the picture, Mr. Welles might better have fired himself—as author, that is—and hired somebody to give Mr. Welles, director, a better script." Alternatively, Time wrote that the "big trick in this picture was to divert a head-on collision of at least six plots, and make of it a smooth-flowing, six-lane whodunit. Orson brings the trick off." Harrison's Reports felt "the action, at times, is confusing, but it seems as if the confusion was purposeful. Some of the photographic effects with their lights and shadows are highly ingenious; they enhance the effect of the action, whether dramatic or melodramatic."

Among retrospective reviews, Time Out Film Guide states that Welles simply didn't care enough to make the narrative seamless: "the principal pleasure of The Lady from Shanghai is its tongue-in-cheek approach to story-telling." One recent book on film noir praises the film for its pervasive atmosphere of malaise and its impressive, extraordinary technical mastery. David Kehr has subsequently declared the film as a masterpiece, with him calling it "the weirdest great movie ever made."

In the British Film Institute's 2012 Sight & Sound poll, six critics each ranked it one of the 10 greatest films of all time. Review aggregator Rotten Tomatoes reports the film has an 85% approval rating based on 52 reviews, with an average rating of 8.2/10. The site's critics consensus reads: "Energetic and inventive, The Lady from Shanghai overcomes its script deficiencies with some of Orson Welles's brilliantly conceived set pieces."

== Preservation ==
The Lady from Shanghai was preserved by the Academy Film Archive, in conjunction with Sony Pictures, in 2000.

== Legacy ==
A remake of the film came close to production at the turn of the century from a screenplay written by Jeff Vintar, based both on Welles's script and the original pulp novel, produced by John Woo and Terence Chang, and starring Brendan Fraser, who wanted Michael Douglas and Catherine Zeta-Jones to co-star. Although the screenplay was considered highly successful, and Fraser was coming off the highly praised Gods and Monsters, the project was abandoned when the head of Sony Pictures, Amy Pascal, decided to concentrate on teen films.

=== Cultural references ===
- In the 1984 Sergio Leone film Once Upon a Time in America, Robert De Niro's character Noodles hides out in a Chinese theatre, a front for an opium den, alluding to a scene in which Orson Welles' character hides out in a Chinese theatre to evade the law.
- In the 1989 movie Ghostbusters II (1989), Rick Moranis, Annie Potts, and Sigourney Weaver's characters are watching The Lady from Shanghai on the TV in Bill Murray's character's apartment. Moranis and Potts were discussing the relationship between Welles and Hayworth.
- The Woody Allen film Manhattan Murder Mystery (1993), a comedy film noir, features a tribute to the film, with its climactic gun battle being set in a cinema behind the screen while it is projecting the shoot-out from The Lady from Shanghai.
- In the 1998 Farrelly brothers comedy, There's Something About Mary, the character of Tucker appears to be based on Arthur Bannister, played by Everett Sloane.
- In the Jim Jarmusch film The Limits of Control (2009), Tilda Swinton's character says that the movie makes no sense.
- The film appears as a collectable film canister in the 2011 video game L.A. Noire.

=== Hall of mirrors sequence ===
The climactic hall of mirrors sequence has entered the narrative of cinema as a trope, replicated often in both film and television. Examples include:

- The 1965 television episode of The Avengers entitled "Too Many Christmas Trees", and broadcast on Christmas Day in the UK, features Steed (Patrick Macnee) and Mrs. Peel (Diana Rigg) confronting their nemesis in a hall of mirrors shoot-out.
- In the 1970 television episode of Randall and Hopkirk (Deceased) entitled "Vendetta for a Dead Man", Eric Jansen (George Sewell) menaces Jeannie Hopkirk (Annette Andre) in a hall of mirrors.
- In the 1973 Robert Clouse film Enter the Dragon, Bruce Lee's character fights the villain Mr. Han in a hall of mirrors.
- In the 1974 James Bond film The Man with the Golden Gun, Bond and the villain, Francisco Scaramanga, have a climactic shootout in a hall of mirrors.
- The 1989 MacGyver episode "Brainwashed" has a scene involving MacGyver's brainwashed friend, Jack Dalton, shooting at him in a hall of mirrors. Episode writer John Sheppard credited The Lady from Shanghai as an influence.
- In the Batman: The Animated Series cartoon episode "Baby Doll" (1994), Mary Dahl shoots out all the Hall of Mirrors while hiding from Batman.
- In Spider-Noir (2026), Cat Hardy has a shootout with Silvermane in a hall of mirrors.
- In the Chad Stahelski film John Wick: Chapter 2 (2017), Keanu Reeves's character fights the pre-final showdown in a museum's hall of mirrors.
